= 2012 CECAFA Cup statistics =

Football tournament statistics

The following are the statistics for the 2012 CECAFA Cup, which took place in Kampala, Uganda from 24 November to 8 December 2012. All statistics are correct as of 20:00 UTC+3 on 8 December 2012. Goals scored from penalty shoot-outs are not counted.

== Goalscorers ==
5 goals

- (Tanzania) John Bocco
- (Tanzania) Mrisho Ngassa
- (Uganda) Robert Ssentongo

3 goals

- (Burundi) Selemani Ndikumana
- (Burundi) Christophe Nduwarugira
- (Malawi) Chiukepo Msowoya
- (Uganda) Geoffrey Kizito
- (Uganda) Brian Umony
- (Zanzibar) Khamis Mcha Khamis

2 goals

- (Kenya) Clifton Miheso
- (Kenya) David Ochieng
- (Kenya) Mike Baraza
- (Rwanda) Dady Birori

1 goal

- (Burundi) Yusuf Ndikumana
- (Eritrea) Yosief Ghide
- (Eritrea) Hermon Tecleab
- (Ethiopia) Yonathan Kebede
- (Ethiopia) Elias Mamo
- (Kenya) Edwin Lavatsa
- (Kenya) Rama Salim
- (Malawi) Ndaziona Chatsalira
- (Malawi) Miciam Mhone
- (Rwanda) Jean-Baptiste Mugiraneza
- (Rwanda) Haruna Niyonzima
- (Rwanda) Tumaine Ntamuhanga
- (Somalia) Jabril Hassan Mohammed
- (Sudan) Farid Mohamed Najeeb
- (Tanzania) Mwinyi Kazimoto
- (Tanzania) Amri Kiemba
- (Uganda) Hamis Kizza
- (Uganda) Emmanuel Okwi
- (Zanzibar) Aggrey Morris
- (Zanzibar) Abdallah Othman

== Scoring ==
- Total number of goals scored: 62
- Average goals per match: 2.38
- Total number of braces: 8
- Total number of hat-tricks: 1 – Mrisho Ngassa
- Total number of penalty kicks awarded: 4
- Total number of penalty kicks scored: 4
- Penalty kick success rate: 100%
- Most goals scored by a team: 13 – Uganda
- Most goals scored by an individual: 5 – John Bocco, Mrisho Ngassa, Robert Ssentongo
- Fewest goals scored by a team: 0 – Eritrea, South Sudan
- Most goals conceded by a team: 13 – Somalia
- Fewest goals conceded by a team: 1 – Burundi, Uganda
- Best goal difference: +12 – Uganda
- Worst goal difference: -12 – Somalia
- Most goals scored in a match by both teams: 7 – Somalia (0) and Tanzania (7)
- Most goals scored in a match by one team: 7 – Tanzania against Somalia
- Most goals scored in a match by the losing team: 2 – Eritrea against Malawi
- Biggest margin of victory: 7 – Somalia 0–7 Tanzania
- Most clean sheets achieved by a team: 5 – Uganda
- Fewest clean sheets achieved by a team: 0 – Somalia, South Sudan
- Most clean sheets given by an opposing team: 3 – South Sudan
- Fewest clean sheets given by an opposing team: 0 – Burundi, Uganda
- Most consecutive clean sheets achieved by a team: 5 – Uganda
- Most consecutive clean sheets given by an opposing team: 3 – South Sudan
- First goal of the tournament: Yonathan Kebede for Ethiopia against South Sudan
- First brace of the tournament: Christophe Nduwaragira for Burundi against Somalia
- First hat-trick of the tournament: Mrisho Ngassa for Tanzania against Somalia
- Fastest goal in a match from kickoff: 1st minute (0:33) – Mrisho Ngassa for Tanzania against Somalia
- Fastest goal in a match after coming on as a substitute: 9 minutes – Clifton Miheso for Kenya against South Sudan (introduced in the 57th minute)
- Latest goal in a match without extra time: 90+1st minute – Hermon Tecleab for Eritrea against Malawi
- Latest winning goal in a match without extra time: 90th minute – Geoffrey Kizito for Uganda against Kenya
- Most goals scored by one player in a match: 5 – Mrisho Ngassa for Tanzania against Somalia
- Own goals scored: 1 – Nadir Haroub (Zanzibar)

== Wins and losses ==
- Most wins: 6 – Uganda
- Fewest wins: 0 – Eritrea, Somalia, South Sudan
- Most losses: 3 – Ethiopia, Somalia, South Sudan
- Fewest losses: 0 – Uganda
- Most draws: 4 – Zanzibar
- Fewest draws: 0 – Burundi, Ethiopia, Kenya, Malawi, Rwanda, Somalia, South Sudan, Sudan, Tanzania, Uganda
- Most points in the group stage: 9 – Burundi, Uganda
- Fewest points in the group stage: 0 – Somalia, South Sudan

== Disciplinary record ==
- Total number of yellow cards: 38
- Average yellow cards per match: 1.46
- Total number of red cards: 1
- Average red cards per match: 0.04
- First yellow card of the tournament: Robel Girma for Ethiopia against South Sudan
- First red card of the tournament: Adeyum Saleh Ahmed for Zanzibar against Kenya
- Fastest yellow card from kick off: 3rd minute – John Bocco for Tanzania against Zanzibar
- Fastest yellow card after coming on as a substitute: 1 minute – Imran Nshimiyimana for Rwanda against Eritrea (introduced in the 83rd minute)
- Latest yellow card in a match without extra time: 90+1st minute – Masoud Nassor for Zanzibar against Rwanda
- Latest yellow card in a match with extra time: 112th minute – Adeyum Saleh Ahmed for Zanzibar against Kenya
- Fastest dismissal from kick off: 112th minute – Adeyum Saleh Ahmed for Zanzibar against Kenya
- Latest dismissal in a match without extra time: 112th minute – Adeyum Saleh Ahmed for Zanzibar against Kenya
- Latest dismissal in a match with extra time: 112th minute – Adeyum Saleh Ahmed for Zanzibar against Kenya
- Shortest time difference between two yellow cards given to the same player: 54 minutes – Adeyum Saleh Ahmed for Zanzibar against Kenya (Booked in the 58th minute and again in the 112th)
- Most yellow cards (team): 7 – Kenya
- Most red cards (team): 1 – Zanzibar
- Fewest yellow cards (team): 0 – Somalia
- Most yellow cards (player): 2 – Joackins Atudo, Robel Girma
- Most red cards (player): 1 – Adeyum Saleh Ahmed
- Most yellow cards (match): 4 – Rwanda vs Zanzibar
- Most red cards (match): 1 – Zanzibar vs Kenya
- Fewest yellow cards (match): 0 – Rwanda vs Malawi, Somalia vs Tanzania, Tanzania vs Burundi, Tanzania vs Sudan, Uganda vs Ethiopia, Zanzibar vs Eritrea
- Most cards in one match: 4 cards; 3 yellow cards, 1 red card – Rwanda vs Zanzibar; Zanzibar vs Kenya

=== By match ===
Day	Round	Team 1	Score	Team 2	Referee	Total cards	Booked	(yellow card) (red card)	Sent off (straight red)
Day 1	Group A	Ethiopia	1–0	South Sudan	(Rwanda) Louis Hakizimana	1	1	0	0
Day 1	Group A	Uganda	1–0	Kenya	(Burundi) Thierry Nkurunziza	3	3	0	0
Day 2	Group B	Burundi	5–1	Somalia	(Uganda) Ali Kalyango	1	1	0	0
Day 4	Group A	South Sudan	0–2	Kenya	(Tanzania) Israel Mujuni	1	1	0	0
Day 5	Group B	Somalia	0–1	Sudan	(Eritrea) Mensur Maeruf	3	3	0	0
Day 6	Group C	Malawi	3–2	Eritrea	(Uganda) Dennis Batte	2	2	0	0
Day 6	Group C	Rwanda	1–2	Zanzibar	(Uganda) Ali Kalyango	4	4	0	0
Day 7	Group A	Kenya	3–1	Ethiopia	(Burundi) Thierry Nkurunziza	2	2	0	0
Day 7	Group A	South Sudan	0–4	Uganda	(Rwanda) Louis Hakizimana	2	2	0	0
Day 8	Group C	Eritrea	0–2	Rwanda	(Tanzania) Israel Mujuni	2	2	0	0
Day 9	Quarter-finals	Rwanda	0–2	Tanzania	(Sudan) Mohamed El Fadhil	3	3	0	0
Day 9	Quarter-finals	Burundi	0–0 (5–6 p)	Zanzibar	(Uganda) Dennis Batte	2	2	0	0
Day 10	Quarter-finals	Kenya	1–0	Malawi	(Tanzania) Israel Mujuni	1	1	0	0
Day 10	Quarter-finals	Uganda	2–0	Ethiopia	(Burundi) Thierry Nkurunziza	1	1	0	0
Day 11	Semi-finals	Zanzibar	2–2 (2–4 p)	Kenya	(Burundi) Thierry Nkurunziza	4	3	1	0
Day 11	Semi-finals	Tanzania	0–3	Uganda	(Sudan) Mohamed El Fadhil	1	1	0	0
Day 12	Third place play-off	Tanzania	1–1 (5–6 p)	Zanzibar	(Uganda) Dennis Batte	3	3	0	0
Day 12	Final	Uganda	2–1	Kenya	(Burundi) Thierry Nkurunziza	3	3	0	0
Total						39	38	1	0

=== By referee ===
Referee	Matches	Red	Yellow	Red cards	PKs awarded
(Burundi) Thierry Nkurunziza	5	1	12	1 second yellow	1
(Uganda) Dennis Batte	5	0	7	n/a	1
(Sudan) Mohamed El Fadhil	4	0	4	n/a	
(Uganda) Ali Kalyango	3	0	5	n/a	1
(Tanzania) Israel Mujuni	3	0	4	n/a	
(Rwanda) Louis Hakizimana	2	0	3	n/a	
(Uganda) Ronnie Kalema	2	0	0	n/a	1
(Eritrea) Mensur Maeruf	1	0	3	n/a	
Total	25	1	38	1 second yellow	4

=== By team ===
Team	Yellow	Red	Red Cards	Suspensions
Kenya	7	0	n/a	
Zanzibar	6	1	A. Saleh vs Kenya second yellow card	A. Saleh vs Tanzania
Rwanda	5	0	n/a	
Ethiopia	4	0	n/a	
Sudan	3	0	n/a	
Tanzania	3	0	n/a	
Uganda	3	0	n/a	
Eritrea	2	0	n/a	
South Sudan	2	0	n/a	
Burundi	1	0	n/a	
Malawi	1	0	n/a	

=== By individual ===
Name	Team	Red	Yellow	Suspended for match(es):
Adeyum Saleh Ahmed	Zanzibar	1	1	vs Tanzania (TP)
Joackins Atudo	Kenya	0	2	
Robel Girma	Ethiopia	0	2	
Aggrey Morris	Zanzibar	0	2	
Faris Abdallah	Sudan	0	1	
Sami Abdallah	Sudan	0	1	
Deng Atiti	South Sudan	0	1	
Azizi Saweji Azizi	Zanzibar	0	1	
Mike Baraza	Kenya	0	1	
Hamdani Bariyanga	Rwanda	0	1	
John Bocco	Tanzania	0	1	
Chala Deriba	Ethiopia	0	1	
Rodrick Gonani	Malawi	0	1	
Dennis Iguma	Uganda	0	1	
Henry Kalungi	Uganda	0	1	
Amri Kiemba	Tanzania	0	1	
Anthony "Modo" Kimani	Kenya	0	1	
Anthony "Muki" Kimani	Kenya	0	1	
Bernard Mang'oli	Kenya	0	1	
Jimmy Mbaraga	Rwanda	0	1	
Haile Mehrawi	Eritrea	0	1	
Emmanuel Miskeen	South Sudan	0	1	
Musaidris Mohammed	Sudan	0	1	
Jean-Baptiste Mugiraneza	Rwanda	0	1	
Masoud Nassor	Zanzibar	0	1	
Saïdi Nduwimana	Burundi	0	1	
Haruna Niyonzima	Rwanda	0	1	
Imran Nshimiyimana	Rwanda	0	1	
Erasto Nyoni	Tanzania	0	1	
Emmanuel Okwi	Uganda	0	1	
David Owino	Kenya	0	1	
Abdalla Saif	Zanzibar	0	1	
Moges Tadesse	Ethiopia	0	1	
Tekle Tesfalem	Eritrea	0	1	
Kelvin Yondan	Tanzania	0	1	

== Overall statistics ==
Bold numbers indicate the maximum values in each column.

Team	Pld	W	D	L	Pts	APts	GF	AGF	GA	AGA	GD	AGD	CS	ACS	YC	AYC	RC	ARC
Burundi	4	3	1	0	10	2.50	7	1.75	1	0.25	+6	1.50	2	0.50	1	0.25	0	0.00
Eritrea	3	0	1	2	1	0.33	2	0.67	5	1.67	−3	−1.00	1	0.33	2	0.67	0	0.00
Ethiopia	4	1	0	**3**	3	0.75	2	0.50	6	1.50	−4	−1.00	1	0.25	4	1.00	0	0.00
Kenya	**6**	3	1	2	10	1.67	9	1.50	6	1.00	+3	0.50	2	0.33	**7**	1.17	0	0.00
Malawi	4	2	0	2	6	1.50	5	1.25	5	1.25	0	0.00	1	0.25	1	0.25	0	0.00
Rwanda	4	2	0	2	6	1.50	5	1.25	4	1.00	+1	0.25	2	0.50	5	**1.25**	0	0.00
Somalia	3	0	0	**3**	0	0.00	1	0.33	**13**	**4.33**	−12	−4.00	0	0.00	0	0.00	0	0.00
South Sudan	3	0	0	**3**	0	0.00	0	0.00	7	2.33	−7	−2.33	0	0.00	2	0.67	0	0.00
Sudan	3	1	0	2	3	1.00	1	0.33	3	1.00	−2	−0.67	1	0.33	3	1.00	0	0.00
Tanzania	**6**	3	1	2	10	1.67	12	2.00	5	0.83	+7	1.17	3	0.50	4	0.67	0	0.00
**Uganda**	**6**	**6**	0	0	**18**	**3.00**	**13**	**2.17**	1	0.17	**+12**	**2.00**	**5**	**0.83**	3	0.50	0	0.00
Zanzibar	**6**	1	**4**	1	7	1.17	5	0.83	6	1.00	−1	−0.17	1	0.17	6	1.00	**1**	**0.17**
Total	26^{(1)}	22	4^{(2)}	22	74	1.42	62	1.19	62	1.19	0	0.00	19	0.37	38	0.73	1	0.02

Updated to games played on 8 December 2012. Team(s) rendered in italics represent(s) the host nation(s). The competition's winning team is rendered in bold.
^{(1)} – Total games lost not counted in total games played (total games lost = total games won)
^{(2)} – Total number of games drawn (tied) for all teams = Total number of games drawn (tied) ÷ 2 (both teams involved)
^{(3)} – As per statistical convention in football, matches decided in extra time are counted as wins and losses, while matches decided by penalty shoot-outs are counted as draws.

== See also ==
- 2012 CECAFA Cup scorers
- 2012 CECAFA Cup schedule
