= 2012 CECAFA Cup =

CECAFA Tusker Challenge Cup

Tournament details
- Host country: Uganda
- Dates: 24 November – 8 December
- Teams: 12 (from 2 sub-confederations)
- Venues: 2 (in 1 host city)

Final positions
- Champions: Uganda (13th title)
- Runners-up: Kenya
- Third place: Zanzibar
- Fourth place: Tanzania

Tournament statistics
- Matches played: 26
- Goals scored: 62 (2.38 per match)
- Top scorer(s): (Tanzania) John Bocco (Tanzania) Mrisho Ngassa (Uganda) Robert Ssentongo (5 goals each)
- Best player: (Uganda) Brian Umony
- Best goalkeeper: (Uganda) Hamza Muwonge

The 2012 CECAFA Cup (known as the CECAFA Tusker Challenge Cup for sponsorship reasons) was the 36th edition of the annual CECAFA Cup, an international football competition consisting of national teams of member nations of the Council for East and Central Africa Football Associations (CECAFA). The tournament, which was held in Uganda from 24 November to 8 December, saw South Sudan participate in their first international football tournament. Hosts Uganda beat Kenya in the final to extend their record to 13 titles.

== Background ==
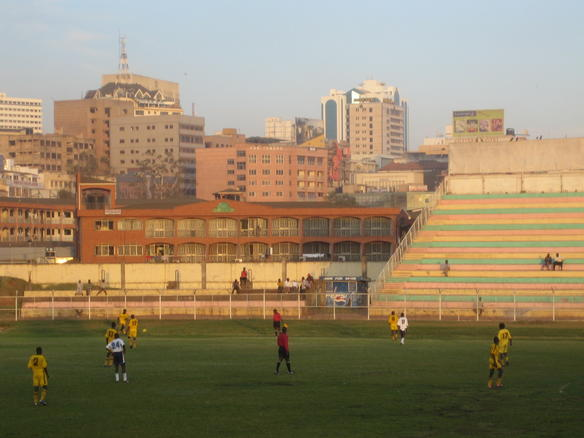
A view of the Nakivubo Stadium, which was to host 2 matches during the course of the tournament.

From November 2011, the tournament was planned to take place in Kenya, and preparations already began to take place, including the renovation of the Moi Stadium in Kisumu. However, in August 2012, CECAFA General Secretary Nicholas Musonye stated that it would be moved to Uganda after a request from the tournament sponsors, East African Breweries. This sparked heated debate between Musonye and Football Kenya Federation (FKF) Chairman Sam Nyamweya, who had even received support from South Sudan to host the tournament in Kenya.

Matches were played at the Namboole Stadium, with a capacity of 45,202. They were also to be played at the Nakivubo Stadium, which can hold 15,000 people. However, CECAFA Secretary General Nicholas Musonye decided to move the remaining group games from the Namboole Stadium since it had been in bad shape due to heavy rains. It was confirmed that on Saturday, 1 December, Somalia would play Tanzania at the Lugogo Stadium at 14:00 UTC+3 while Eritrea would take on Rwanda at the same venue two hours later. On the same day, Sudan were to play Burundi at the Wankulukuku Stadium at 14:00 UTC+3, and finally Malawi to play Zanzibar at the same stadium two hours later.

== Participants ==
The draw for teams to participate in the tournament was held on 12 November 2012. It was originally scheduled for 8 November, but was postponed for undisclosed reasons. Botswana, Cameroon, Ivory Coast, Malawi, Zambia and Zimbabwe had all expressed interest in participating in the tournament. Botswana's interest to join had eventually "fallen off", while Cameroon were not considered as they wanted to send their under-23 team. Ivory Coast and Zambia, having qualified for the 2013 Africa Cup of Nations, were ineligible to enter. The Confederation of African Football (CAF) rules do not allow teams to compete in another competition within a two-month period of the Africa Cup of Nations. Ethiopia also qualified for the 2013 Africa Cup of Nations, but still took part as they are members of CECAFA. On 6 November 2012, the Football Association of Malawi announced that they had been officially invited to the tournament as a guest team. They replaced Djibouti, who pulled out due to administrative reasons.

Tournament sponsors East African Breweries set a US$450,000 budget for the tournament, including US$30,000 as prize money for the winning team. The runners-up and third-placed teams received US$20,000 and US$10,000 respectively.

The following teams were confirmed to participate in the tournament:

- Burundi
- Ethiopia
- Eritrea
- Kenya
- Malawi (invitee)
- Rwanda
- Somalia
- South Sudan
- Sudan
- Tanzania
- Uganda (host)
- Zanzibar

== Match officials ==
The following 16 officials were appointed by CECAFA to participate in the tournament.

Referees

- (Burundi) Thierry Nkurunziza
- (Eritrea) Mensur Maeruf
- (Kenya) Anthony Ogwayo
- (Rwanda) Louis Hakizimana
- (Sudan) Mohamed El Fadhil
- (Tanzania) Israel Mujuni
- (Uganda) Dennis Batte
- (Uganda) Ali Kalyango

Assistant referees

- (Ethiopia) Mussie Kindie
- (Kenya) Peter Sabatia
- (Rwanda) Ambroise Hakizimana
- (Somalia) Omar Abukar
- (Sudan) Mohammed Idam
- (Tanzania) Klemence Erasmo
- (Uganda) Mark Ssonko
- (Zanzibar) Ali Kinduli

== Group stage ==
The group stage began on 24 November and ended on 1 December. The matchdays were 24, 25, 26, 27, 28, 29 and 30 November and 1 December. If two or more teams are equal on points on completion of the group matches, the following criteria are applied to determine the rankings (in descending order):

1. Number of points obtained in games between the teams involved;
2. Goal difference in games between the teams involved;
3. Goals scored in games between the teams involved;
4. Away goals scored in games between the teams involved;
5. Goal difference in all games;
6. Goals scored in all games;
7. Drawing of lots.

Key to colours in group tables
Group winners and runners-up advanced to the quarter-finals

=== Group A ===
Team	Pld	W	D	L	GF	GA	GD	Pts
Uganda	3	3	0	0	6	0	+6	9
Kenya	3	2	0	1	5	2	+3	6
Ethiopia	3	1	0	2	2	4	−2	3
South Sudan	3	0	0	3	0	7	−7	0

24 November 2012
Ethiopia	1–0	South Sudan	Namboole Stadium
Uganda	1–0	Kenya	Namboole Stadium
27 November 2012
South Sudan	0–2	Kenya	Namboole Stadium
Uganda	1–0	Ethiopia	Namboole Stadium
30 November 2012
Kenya	3–1	Ethiopia	Namboole Stadium
South Sudan	0–4	Uganda	Namboole Stadium

=== Group B ===
Team	Pld	W	D	L	GF	GA	GD	Pts
Burundi	3	3	0	0	7	1	+6	9
Tanzania	3	2	0	1	9	1	+8	6
Sudan	3	1	0	2	1	3	−2	3
Somalia	3	0	0	3	1	13	−12	0

25 November 2012
Burundi	5–1	Somalia	Namboole Stadium
Tanzania	2–0	Sudan	Namboole Stadium
28 November 2012
Somalia	0–1	Sudan	Namboole Stadium
Tanzania	0–1	Burundi	Namboole Stadium
1 December 2012
Somalia	0–7	Tanzania	Lugogo Stadium
Sudan	0–1	Burundi	Wankulukuku Stadium

=== Group C ===
Team	Pld	W	D	L	GF	GA	GD	Pts
Rwanda	3	2	0	1	5	2	+3	6
Malawi	3	2	0	1	5	4	+1	6
Zanzibar	3	1	1	1	2	3	−1	4
Eritrea	3	0	1	2	2	5	−3	1

26 November 2012
Zanzibar	0–0	Eritrea	Namboole Stadium
Rwanda	2–0	Malawi	Namboole Stadium
29 November 2012
Malawi	3–2	Eritrea	Namboole Stadium
Rwanda	1–2	Zanzibar	Namboole Stadium
1 December 2012
Eritrea	0–2	Rwanda	Lugogo Stadium
Malawi	2–0	Zanzibar	Wankulukuku Stadium

=== Third place qualification ===
In addition to the group stage winners and runners-up, the two best third-placed teams were ranked at the end of the group stage to determine who would qualify for the knockout stage.

Team	Pld	W	D	L	GF	GA	GD	Pts
Zanzibar	3	1	1	1	2	3	−1	4
Ethiopia	3	1	0	2	2	4	−2	3
Sudan	3	1	0	2	1	3	−2	3

== Knockout stage ==
The knockout stage began on 3 December with the quarter-finals and ended on 8 December with the final. In this stage, teams play against each other once. The losers of the semi-finals play against each other in a third place playoff where the winner is placed third overall in the entire competition.

=== Bracket ===
Quarter-finals
3 December – Kampala
Rwanda	0
Tanzania	2
4 December – Kampala
Uganda	2
Ethiopia	0
3 December – Kampala
Burundi	0 (5)
Zanzibar (pen.)	0 (6)
4 December – Kampala
Kenya	1
Malawi	0

Semi-finals
6 December – Kampala
Tanzania	0
Uganda	3
6 December – Kampala
Zanzibar	2 (2)
Kenya (pen.)	2 (4)

Final
8 December – Kampala
Uganda	2
Kenya	1
Third place
8 December – Kampala
Tanzania	1 (5)
Zanzibar (pen.)	1 (6)

=== Quarter-finals ===
The quarter-finals were played on 3–4 December 2012.

Team 1	Score	Team 2
Rwanda	0–2	Tanzania
Uganda	2–0	Ethiopia
Burundi	0–0 (5–6 p)	Zanzibar
Kenya	1–0	Malawi

=== Semi-finals ===
The semi-finals were played on 6 December 2012.

Team 1	Score	Team 2
Tanzania	0–3	Uganda
Zanzibar	2–2 (2–4 p)	Kenya

=== Third place playoff ===
8 December 2012	Tanzania	1–1 (5–6 p)	Zanzibar	Namboole Stadium, Kampala
16:00 UTC+3	Bocco (yellow card) 3'; Kazimoto 19'; Kiemba (yellow card) 86'	Report; News	Morris (yellow card) 45'; Ab. Osman 85'	Attendance: 70,986; Referee: Dennis Batte (Uganda)
	Penalties
	Kazimoto (penalty missed); Nyoni (penalty scored); Maftar (penalty scored); Nditi (penalty scored); Kapombe (penalty scored); Domayo (penalty scored); Yondan (penalty missed)		(penalty missed) Nassor; (penalty scored) Khamis; (penalty scored) Nuhu; (penalty scored) Morris; (penalty scored) Ab. Osman; (penalty scored) Haroub; (penalty scored) Makaame

=== Final ===
8 December 2012	Uganda	2–1	Kenya	Namboole Stadium, Kampala
18:00 UTC+3	Ssentongo 28'; Okwi (yellow card) 41'; Kizito 90'	Report	Baraza (yellow card) 39'; Atudo (yellow card) 79'; Lavatsa 87'	Referee: Thierry Nkurunziza (Burundi)

2012 CECAFA Cup champions

Uganda
13th title

== Top scorers ==
5 goals

- (Tanzania) John Bocco
- (Tanzania) Mrisho Ngassa
- (Uganda) Robert Ssentongo

3 goals

- (Burundi) Selemani Ndikumana
- (Burundi) Christophe Nduwarugira
- (Malawi) Chiukepo Msowoya
- (Uganda) Geoffrey Kizito
- (Uganda) Brian Umony
- (Zanzibar) Khamis Mcha Khamis

2 goals

- (Kenya) Clifton Miheso
- (Kenya) David Ochieng
- (Kenya) Mike Baraza
- (Rwanda) Dady Birori

1 goal

- (Burundi) Yusuf Ndikumana
- (Eritrea) Yosief Ghide
- (Eritrea) Hermon Tecleab
- (Ethiopia) Yonathan Kebede
- (Ethiopia) Elias Mamo
- (Kenya) Edwin Lavatsa
- (Kenya) Rama Salim
- (Malawi) Ndaziona Chatsalira
- (Malawi) Miciam Mhone
- (Rwanda) Jean-Baptiste Mugiraneza
- (Rwanda) Haruna Niyonzima
- (Rwanda) Tumaine Ntamuhanga
- (Somalia) Jabril Hassan Mohammed
- (Sudan) Farid Mohamed Najeeb
- (Tanzania) Mwinyi Kazimoto
- (Tanzania) Amri Kiemba
- (Uganda) Hamis Kizza
- (Uganda) Emmanuel Okwi
- (Zanzibar) Aggrey Morris
- (Zanzibar) Abdallah Othman

As of 8 December 2012

== Awards ==
- Player of the Tournament: (Uganda) Brian Umony
- Top goalscorer of the Tournament: (Uganda) Robert Ssentongo
- Goalkeeper of the Tournament: (Uganda) Hamza Muwonge

== Final rankings ==
Teams are ranked using the same tie-breaking criteria as in the group stage, except for the top four teams.

Pos.	Team	Pld	W	D	L	Pts	GF	GA	GD
1	Uganda	6	6	0	0	18	13	1	+12
2	Kenya	6	3	1	2	10	9	6	+3
3	Zanzibar	6	1	4	1	7	5	6	−1
4	Tanzania	6	3	1	2	10	12	5	+7
**Eliminated in the quarter-finals**
5	Burundi	4	3	1	0	10	7	1	+6
6	Rwanda	4	2	0	2	6	5	4	+1
7	Malawi	4	2	0	2	6	5	5	0
8	Ethiopia	4	1	0	3	3	2	6	−4
**Eliminated in the group stage**
9	Sudan	3	1	0	2	3	1	3	−2
10	Eritrea	3	0	1	2	1	2	5	−3
11	South Sudan	3	0	0	3	0	0	7	−7
12	Somalia	3	0	0	3	0	1	13	−12
Total		26^{(1)}	22	4^{(2)}	22	74	62	62	0

Updated to games played on 8 December 2012. Team(s) rendered in italics represent(s) the host nation(s). The competition's winning team is rendered in bold.
^{(1)} – Total games lost not counted in total games played (total games lost = total games won)
^{(2)} – Total number of games drawn (tied) for all teams = Total number of games drawn (tied) ÷ 2 (both teams involved)
^{(3)} – As per statistical convention in football, matches decided in extra time are counted as wins and losses, while matches decided by penalty shoot-outs are counted as draws.

== See also ==
- 2012 CECAFA Cup schedule
- 2012 Kagame Interclub Cup
