= 2012 CECAFA Cup final =

- Event: 2012 CECAFA Cup
Uganda	Kenya
(Uganda)	(Kenya)
2	1
- Date: 8 December 2012
- Venue: Namboole Stadium, Kampala, Uganda
- Referee: Thierry Nkurunziza (Burundi)

The 2012 CECAFA Cup final was a football match which took place on Saturday, 8 December 2012 at the Namboole Stadium in Kampala, Uganda. It was contested by the winners of the semi-finals, Uganda and Kenya, at 18:00 UTC+3, after the third place playoff, which was played on the same day at 16:00 UTC+3, to determine the winner of the 2012 CECAFA Cup.

== Background ==
Before the match taking place, the two teams had 17 titles between them, with Uganda claiming a record 12 of them. Kenya hadn't participated in a CECAFA Cup final since 2008, when they were beaten 1–0 by Uganda, who won their 9th title that year. This was the second time the two nations faced each other in a final since the beginning of the tournament in 1973, and the 33rd time since the beginning of the Gossage Cup in 1926.

At the group stage of the tournament, Uganda beat Kenya 1–0 in the second match of the tournament, through a goal from Geoffrey Kizito in the 74th minute.

== Road to the final ==
=== Uganda ===
Hosts Uganda were drawn into Group A, alongside Kenya, Ethiopia and South Sudan, who were competing in their first ever competitive football tournament. They opened against Kenya on 24 November 2012, against whom they won through a header by midfielder Geoffrey Kizito in the 74th minute. In their next group match against Ethiopia, a 9th-minute goal from Brian Umony was enough to take Uganda to the quarter-finals. Their final group match against South Sudan appeared to be less of a challenge than the previous two, as a brace from Brian Umony and goals from Robert Ssentongo and Hamis Kizza culminated in a 4–0 humiliation at the expense of the newcomers.

At the quarter-finals, the Cranes found themselves up against Ethiopia. This time, Uganda managed to beat the Walya Antelopes 2–0 through a 6th-minute goal from Geoffrey Kizito and a 61st-minute cracker from Robert Ssentongo to book a place in the semi-finals, where they faced local rivals Tanzania. The unexpected 3–0 rout of the Taifa Stars began with a thunderbolt of a shot from Simba striker Emmanuel Okwi in the 12th minute. Robert Ssentongo then took his tally to four goals after scoring from 20 yards out in the 51st minute and later capitalising on a goalkeeping blunder from Juma Kaseja with the help of team-mates in the 72nd minute.

=== Kenya ===
Like Uganda, Kenya were drawn into Group A alongside Ethiopia and South Sudan. They lost their opening match against Uganda, after midfielder Geoffrey Kizito headed home in the 74th minute. It didn't take long, however, for the Harambee Stars to get into winning form when they faced South Sudan on 27 November 2012. Midfielder David Ochieng rose high to head in a corner kick taken by Kevin Omondi in the 13th minute to give Kenya the lead. The second half brought the second and final goal of the match when 57th-minute substitute Clifton Miheso scored 9 minutes after his introduction to send the Bright Stars out of the tournament. The night after the match, midfielders Paul Were and Kevin Omondi sneaked out of the Kenya team's camp and did not return until the next morning. Interim coach James Nandwa consequently expelled them from the team, citing "gross misconduct", and called in Bernard Mang'oli and Victor Ochieng as replacements. The team maintained its fine form against Ethiopia, whom they beat 3–1 in the penultimate match of their group. Gor Mahia striker Rama Salim opened the scoring in the 20th minute, and 7 minutes later his goal was followed by a header from Clifton Miheso, who was left unmarked in the Walya Antelopes' box and took his tally to two for the tournament. Three minutes later, though, striker Elias Mamo caught the Kenyan back line off guard with his long-range shot to narrow the score. However, a comeback was not to be for Ethiopia as David Ochieng also doubled his tally through a header from a free kick taken by left back Abdalla Juma to book a place in the quarter-finals against Malawi.

The quarter-final clash against Malawi proved to be challenging for the Harambee Stars, but they nevertheless found a goal in the 57th minute, when A.F.C. Leopards veteran Mike Baraza diverted Abdalla Juma's shot on goal by heading it the other way, leaving goalkeeper Charles Swini for dead and steering Kenya through to the semi-finals. Prior to their semi-final match against Zanzibar, Were and Omondi were recalled to the squad, as their replacements, Mang'oli and Ochieng, had aggravated injuries against Malawi. During the match, Khamis Mcha Khamis broke the deadlock in the 20th minute after converting a cross from Ahmed Adeyom. After ten minutes, however, captain Nadir Haroub headed Kevin Omondi's cross, intended for Mike Baraza, into his own net with goalkeeper Ally Mwadini off his line. Mwadini almost cost his side another goal in the 36th minute, after his attempted clearance came off Baraza and hit the post and went out for a corner kick. Late in the second half, Aggrey Morris regained the lead for Zanzibar after striker Jaku Juma Jaku was tackled in the box from behind by David Owino. It took just five minutes for Kenya to level the score, after Baraza headed home a corner kick taken by left back Abdalla Juma. Though extra time was not enough to find the match a winner, Ahmed Adeyom became the first player to be sent off in the tournament, after injuring Victor Ochieng in the 112th minute and getting booked a second time, having been already shown the yellow card in the 58th minute. The subsequent penalty shoot-out came off to a disastrous start for the Heroes, as Khamis Mcha Khamis and Ally Othman both missed their team's first two penalties. Goals from Aggrey Morris and Samir Nuhu were not enough, as Mike Baraza, Joackins Atudo, Edwin Lavatsa and finally Abdalla Juma were all on target to take Kenya to the final.

=== Summary ===
Uganda		Round	Kenya	
Opponent	Result	Group stage	Opponent	Result
Kenya	1−0	Matchday 1	Uganda	0−1
Ethiopia	1−0	Matchday 2	South Sudan	2−0
South Sudan	4−0	Matchday 3	Ethiopia	3−1
Group A winner: Team / Pld / W / D / L / GF / GA / GD / Pts; Uganda / 3 / 3 / 0 / 0 / 6 / 0 / +6 / 9; Kenya / 3 / 2 / 0 / 1 / 5 / 2 / +3 / 6; Ethiopia / 3 / 1 / 0 / 2 / 2 / 4 / −2 / 3; South Sudan / 3 / 0 / 0 / 3 / 0 / 7 / −7 / 0; Source:		Final standings	Group A runner-up: Team / Pld / W / D / L / GF / GA / GD / Pts; Uganda / 3 / 3 / 0 / 0 / 6 / 0 / +6 / 9; Kenya / 3 / 2 / 0 / 1 / 5 / 2 / +3 / 6; Ethiopia / 3 / 1 / 0 / 2 / 2 / 4 / −2 / 3; South Sudan / 3 / 0 / 0 / 3 / 0 / 7 / −7 / 0; Source:	
Opponent	Result	Knockout stage	Opponent	Result
Ethiopia	2−0	Quarter-finals	Malawi	1−0
Tanzania	3−0	Semi-finals	Zanzibar	2−2 (2–4 p)

== Match ==
=== Summary ===
Uganda began the match in control of the game, and Kenya ultimately crumbled under the pressure of the Cranes' fierce attacks, when Robert Ssentongo's 26th-minute shot came off captain Anthony "Modo" Kimani's boot and flew into the net to give the hosts the lead. Both teams fought for possession for virtually the rest of the match, and Gor Mahia forward Edwin Lavatsa could have equalised for the Harambee Stars before the half-time break, but his first-time shot from a through pass by Sofapaka midfielder Humphrey Mieno hit the post and went out for a goal kick.

The Kenyans did not give up, and finally, in the 87th minute, Lavatsa was on target again, this time levelling the score for his side by converting an accurate pass from winger Paul Were and restoring hope to the Kenyan fans for a first title in 10 years. Three minutes later, those very hopes were to be shattered when captain Modo was adjudged to have handled the ball just outside the right side of the box. His Ugandan counterpart Hassan Wasswa made no mistake, delivering a superb cross into the box for Sài Gòn midfielder Geoffrey Kizito to head home and give Uganda a record 13th title, widening the gap between them and Kenya to 7 titles.

=== Details ===
8 December 2012
18:00 UTC+3

Uganda	2–1	Kenya
Ssentongo 28'; Kizito 90'	Report	Lavatsa 87'

Namboole Stadium, Kampala
Referee: Thierry Nkurunziza (Burundi)

Uganda	Kenya

UGANDA:
GK	18	Hamza Muwonge
RB	6	Dennis Iguma
CB	4	Henry Kalungi
CB	5	Isaac Isinde
LB	15	Godfrey Walusimbi
RM	13	Moses Oloya		(substituted off) 90+4'
CM	3	Geoffrey Kizito
CM	16	Hassan Wasswa (c)
LM	2	Joseph Ochaya		(substituted off) 55'
CF	9	Robert Ssentongo
CF	7	Emmanuel Okwi	(yellow card) 41'	(substituted off) 65'
Substitutes:
GK	19	Ali Kimera
DF	14	Nicholas Wadada
MF	8	Saidi Kyeyune		(substituted on) 65'
MF	12	Manco Kawesa		(substituted on) 90+4'
MF	17	Brian Majwega
FW	10	Brian Umony
FW	11	Hamis Kizza		(substituted on) 55'
Head coach:
(Scotland) Bobby Williamson

KENYA:
GK	1	Duncan Ochieng
RB	14	Anthony "Modo" Kimani (c)
CB	4	Joackins Atudo	(yellow card) 79'
CB	15	David Owino		(substituted off) 21'
LB	3	Abdalla Juma
RM	17	Clifton Miheso		(substituted off) 49'
CM	16	Humphrey Mieno
CM	6	Anthony "Muki" Kimani
LM	18	David Ochieng
CF	19	Edwin Lavatsa
CF	9	Mike Baraza	(yellow card) 39'
Substitutes:
GK	10	Martin Musalia
DF	2	Thomas Wanyama
MF	11	Paul Were		(substituted on) 81'
MF	12	Kevin Omondi		(substituted on) 21' (substituted off) 81'
FW	5	Enock Agwanda
FW	8	Rama Salim		(substituted on) 49'
FW	13	Patilah Omotto
Head coach:
(Kenya) James Nandwa

Assistant referees:
Mussie Kindie (Ethiopia)
Mohammed Idam (Sudan)
Fourth official:
Mohamed El Fadhil (Sudan)

Match rules

- 90 minutes.
- Penalty shoot-out if scores still level.
- Seven named substitutes.
- Maximum of three substitutions.

== Awards ==
After the match, CECAFA representatives awarded individual awards as well as team medals, cash prizes and the trophy. Zanzibar, who beat Tanzania in the third place play-off, received bronze medals and a cash prize of US$10,000. Kenya received silver medals and a US$20,000 cash prize, while Uganda received gold medals, a US$30,000 cash prize and the CECAFA Cup trophy. Individual awards were given as follows:

- Player of the Tournament: (Uganda) Brian Umony
- Top goalscorer of the Tournament: (Uganda) Robert Ssentongo
- Goalkeeper of the Tournament: (Uganda) Hamza Muwonge

== See also ==
- 2012 Kagame Interclub Cup Final
