= 2012 CECAFA Cup knockout stage =

The knockout stage of the 2012 CECAFA Cup began on 3 December 2012 with the quarter-finals and ended on 8 December 2012 with the final. Matches were played at the Namboole Stadium and the Lugogo Stadium in Kampala, Uganda.

== Format ==
The knockout stage involved the eight teams which advanced from the group stage: the top two teams from each group and the two best third-placed teams.

In this stage, teams play against each other once. The losers of the semi-finals play against each other in the third place playoff where the winners are placed third overall in the entire competition and receive US$ 10,000. The winners of the final receive US$30,000 and the runners-up US$20,000.

=== Match rules ===
==== Quarter-finals, third place playoff and final ====
- Regulation time is 90 minutes.
- If scores are still level after regulation time, there will be no extra time and a Penalty shoot-out decides the winner.
- Each team is allowed to have seven named substitutes.
- Each team is allowed to make a maximum of three substitutions.

==== Semi-finals ====
- Regulation time is 90 minutes.
- If scores are still level after regulation time, there will be 30 minutes of extra time and a Penalty shoot-out thereafter if scores are still level after extra time to decide the winner.
- Each team is allowed to have seven named substitutes.
- Each team is allowed to make a maximum of three substitutions.

== Bracket ==
Quarter-finals
3 December
Rwanda	0
Tanzania	2
4 December
Uganda	2
Ethiopia	0
3 December
Burundi	0 (5)
Zanzibar	0 (6)
4 December
Kenya	1
Malawi	0

Semi-finals
6 December
Tanzania	0
Uganda	3
6 December
Zanzibar	2 (2)
Kenya	2 (4)

Final
8 December
Uganda	2
Kenya	1
Third place
8 December
Tanzania	1 (5)
Zanzibar	1 (6)

== Quarter-finals ==
The quarter-finals were played on 3–4 December 2012.

3 December 2012
14:00 UTC+3

Rwanda	0 – 2	Tanzania
Niyonzima (yellow card) 45+3'; Mugiraneza (yellow card) 74'	Report	Kiemba 34'; Nyoni (yellow card) 42'; Bocco 54'

Lugogo Stadium, Kampala
Referee: Mohamed El Fadhil (Sudan)

3 December 2012
16:00 UTC+3

Burundi	0 – 0	Zanzibar
	Report	Morris (yellow card) 45+4'; Azizi (yellow card) 79'
Penalties
S. Ndikumana (penalty missed); Nzingamasabo (penalty scored); Tambwe (penalty scored); Nduwarugira (penalty scored); Nkurikiye (penalty scored); Duhayindavyi (penalty scored); Fiston (penalty missed)	5 – 6	(penalty scored) Khamis; (penalty scored) Adeyom; (penalty scored) Jaku; (penalty missed) Haroub; (penalty scored) Nuhu; (penalty scored) Morris; (penalty scored) Ab. Othman

Lugogo Stadium, Kampala
Referee: Dennis Batte (Uganda)

4 December 2012
16:00 UTC+3

Kenya	1 – 0	Malawi
Owino (yellow card) 49'; Baraza 58'	Report

Namboole Stadium, Kampala
Referee: Israel Mujuni (Tanzania)

4 December 2012
19:00 UTC+3

Uganda	2 – 0	Ethiopia
Kizito 4'; Ssentongo 60'	Report	Tadesse (yellow card) 81'

Namboole Stadium, Kampala
Referee: Thierry Nkurunziza (Burundi)

== Semi-finals ==
The semi-finals were played on 6 December 2012.

6 December 2012
16:00 UTC+3

Zanzibar	2 – 2	Kenya
Khamis 21'; Saleh (yellow card) 58' (red card) 112'; Morris 76' (pen.)	Report	Haroub 30' (o.g.); Atudo (yellow card) 65'; Modo Kimani (yellow card) 75'; Baraza 81'
Penalties
Khamis (penalty missed); Al. Othman (penalty missed); Morris (penalty scored); Nuhu (penalty scored)	2 – 4	(penalty scored) Baraza; (penalty scored) Atudo; (penalty scored) Lavatsa; (penalty scored) Juma

Namboole Stadium, Kampala
Referee: Thierry Nkurunziza (Burundi)

6 December 2012
19:00 UTC+3

Tanzania	0 – 3	Uganda
Yondan (yellow card) 68'	Report	Okwi 12'; Ssentongo 52', 72'

Namboole Stadium, Kampala
Referee: Mohamed El Fadhil (Sudan)

== Third place play-off ==
8 December 2012
16:00 UTC+3

Tanzania	1 – 1	Zanzibar
Bocco (yellow card) 3'; Kazimoto 19'; Kiemba (yellow card) 86'	Report; News	Morris (yellow card) 45'; Ab. Othman 85'
Penalties
Kazimoto (penalty missed); Nyoni (penalty scored); Maftar (penalty scored); Nditi (penalty scored); Kapombe (penalty scored); Domayo (penalty scored); Yondan (penalty missed)	5 – 6	(penalty missed) Nassor; (penalty scored) Khamis; (penalty scored) Nuhu; (penalty scored) Morris; (penalty scored) Ab. Othman; (penalty scored) Haroub; (penalty scored) Makame

Namboole Stadium, Kampala
Referee: Dennis Batte (Uganda)

== Final ==
8 December 2012
18:00 UTC+3

Uganda	2 – 1	Kenya
Ssentongo 28'; Okwi (yellow card) 41'; Kizito 90'	Report	Baraza (yellow card) 39'; Atudo (yellow card) 79'; Lavatsa 87'

Namboole Stadium, Kampala
Referee: Thierry Nkurunziza (Burundi)

== Top scorers (at the knockout stage) ==
3 goals

- (Uganda) Robert Ssentongo

2 goals

- (Kenya) Mike Baraza
- (Uganda) Geoffrey Kizito

1 goal

- (Kenya) Edwin Lavatsa
- (Tanzania) John Bocco
- (Tanzania) Mwinyi Kazimoto
- (Tanzania) Amri Kiemba
- (Uganda) Emmanuel Okwi
- (Zanzibar) Khamis Mcha Khamis
- (Zanzibar) Aggrey Morris
- (Zanzibar) Abdallah Othman

As of 8 December 2012
