= 2012 CECAFA Cup group stage =

The group stage of the 2012 CECAFA Cup began on 24 November 2012 and ended on 1 December 2012. The matchdays were 24, 25, 26, 27, 28, 29, 30 November and 1 December.

The group stage featured 11 CECAFA associations and COSAFA member Malawi as the invited association. Teams were drawn into groups of four, where the top two teams from each group and the two best third-placed teams would advance to the knockout stage.

Tournament organizers moved the remaining group games from the Namboole Stadium as it had been in bad shape due to heavy rains. It was confirmed that on Saturday, 1 December, the Somalia–Tanzania and Eritrea–Rwanda fixtures were moved to the Lugogo Stadium. On the same day, the Sudan–Burundi and Malawi–Zanzibar fixtures were also moved to the Wankulukulu Stadium.

== Tiebreakers ==
The order of tie-breakers used when two or more teams have equal number of points is:

1. Number of points obtained in games between the teams involved;
2. Goal difference in games between the teams involved;
3. Goals scored in games between the teams involved;
4. Away goals scored in games between the teams involved;
5. Goal difference in all games;
6. Goals scored in all games;
7. Drawing of lots.

Key to colours in group tables
Group winners and runners-up advance to the quarter-finals
Third-placed teams to be ranked for advancement to the quarter-finals
Team already eliminated

== Group A ==
Team	Pld	W	D	L	GF	GA	GD	Pts
Uganda	3	3	0	0	6	0	+6	9
Kenya	3	2	0	1	5	2	+3	6
Ethiopia	3	1	0	2	2	4	−2	3
South Sudan	3	0	0	3	0	7	−7	0

24 November 2012
15:00 UTC+3

Ethiopia	1 – 0	South Sudan
Girma (yellow card) 31'; Kebede 60'	Report 1 Report 2

Namboole Stadium, Kampala
Referee: Louis Hakizimana (Rwanda)

24 November 2012
18:00 UTC+3

Uganda	1 – 0	Kenya
Iguma (yellow card) 66'; Kizito 74'	Report 1 Report 2	Mang'oli (yellow card) 21'; Muki Kimani (yellow card) 64'

Namboole Stadium, Kampala
Referee: Thierry Nkurunzinza (Burundi)

27 November 2012
16:00 UTC+3

South Sudan	0 – 2	Kenya
Atiti (yellow card) 23'	Report 1 Report 2 Report 3	Ochieng 13'; Miheso 66'

Namboole Stadium, Kampala
Referee: Israel Mujuni (Tanzania)

27 November 2012
18:00 UTC+3

Uganda	1 – 0	Ethiopia
Umony 9'	Report 1 Report 2

Namboole Stadium, Kampala
Referee: Mohamed El Fadhil (Sudan)

30 November 2012
16:00 UTC+3

Kenya	3 – 1	Ethiopia
Salim 19'; Miheso 26'; D. Ochieng 72'	Report 1 Report 2	Deriba (yellow card) 21'; Mamo 30'; Girma (yellow card) 78'

Namboole Stadium, Kampala
Referee: Thierry Nkurunziza (Burundi)

30 November 2012
18:00 UTC+3

South Sudan	0 – 4	Uganda
Miskeen (yellow card) 68'	Report 1 Report 2	Umony 24', 40'; Ssentongo 47'; Kalungi (yellow card) 49'; Kizza 79'

Namboole Stadium, Kampala
Referee: Louis Hakizimana (Rwanda)

== Group B ==
Team	Pld	W	D	L	GF	GA	GD	Pts
Burundi	3	3	0	0	7	1	+6	9
Tanzania	3	2	0	1	9	1	+8	6
Sudan	3	1	0	2	1	3	−2	3
Somalia	3	0	0	3	1	13	−12	0

25 November 2012
16:00 UTC+3

Burundi	5 – 1	Somalia
Nduwarugira 34', 84'; Y. Ndikumana 41'; S. Ndikumana 78', 88'; Nduwimana (yellow card) 51'	Report 1 Report 2	Mohammed 51' (pen.)

Namboole Stadium, Kampala
Referee: Ali Kalyango (Uganda)

25 November 2012
18:00 UTC+3

Tanzania	2 – 0	Sudan
Bocco 14', 29'	Report 1 Report 2

Namboole Stadium, Kampala
Referee: Dennis Batte (Uganda)

28 November 2012
16:00 UTC+3

Somalia	0 – 1	Sudan
	Report 1 Report 2	Idris (yellow card) 43'; Faris Abdalla (yellow card) 63'; Sami Abdallah (yellow card) 75'; Farid 85'

Namboole Stadium, Kampala
Referee: Mensur Maeruf (Eritrea)

28 November 2012
18:00 UTC+3

Tanzania	0 − 1	Burundi
	Report 1	S. Ndikumana 53' (pen.)

Namboole Stadium, Kampala
Referee: Ronnie Kalema (Uganda)

1 December 2012
14:00 UTC+3

Somalia	0 – 7	Tanzania
	Report	Ngassa 1', 23', 44', 73', 75'; Bocco 26', 42'

Lugogo Stadium, Kampala
Referee: Ronnie Kalema (Uganda)

1 December 2012
14:00 UTC+3

Sudan	0 – 1	Burundi
	Report	Nduwarugira 16'

Wankulukulu Stadium, Kampala
Referee: Dennis Batte (Uganda)

== Group C ==
Team	Pld	W	D	L	GF	GA	GD	Pts
Rwanda	3	2	0	1	5	2	+3	6
Malawi	3	2	0	1	5	4	+1	6
Zanzibar	3	1	1	1	2	3	−1	4
Eritrea	3	0	1	2	2	5	−3	1

26 November 2012
16:00 UTC+3

Zanzibar	0 – 0	Eritrea
	Report

Namboole Stadium, Kampala
Referee: Anthony Ogwayo (Kenya)

26 November 2012
18:00 UTC+3

Rwanda	2 – 0	Malawi
Mugiraneza 37'; Niyonzima 79'	Report 1 Report

Namboole Stadium, Kampala
Referee: Ali Kalyango (Uganda)

29 November 2012
16:00 UTC+3

Malawi	3 – 2	Eritrea
Msowoya 3', 67'; Mhone 11'; Gonani (yellow card) 73'	Report	Tekle (yellow card) 65'; Ghide 69'; Tecleab 90' (pen.)

Namboole Stadium, Kampala
Referee: Dennis Batte (Uganda)

29 November 2012
18:00 UTC+3

Rwanda	1 – 2	Zanzibar
Bariyanga (yellow card) 58'; Mbaraga (yellow card) 77'; Birori 80'	Report	Khamis 9', 62'; Saif (yellow card) 86'; Nassor (yellow card) 90+1'

Namboole Stadium, Kampala
Referee: Ali Kalyango (Uganda)

1 December 2012
16:00 UTC+3

Eritrea	0 – 2	Rwanda
Mehrawi (yellow card) 69'	Report	Birori 16'; Ntamuhanga 77'; Nshimiyimana (yellow card) 84'

Lugogo Stadium, Kampala
Referee: Israel Mujuni (Tanzania)

1 December 2012
16:00 UTC+3

Malawi	2 – 0	Zanzibar
Chatsalira 3'; Msowoya 6'	Report

Wankulukulu Stadium, Kampala
Referee: Mohamed El Fadhil (Sudan)

== Third place qualification ==
Team	Pld	W	D	L	GF	GA	GD	Pts
Zanzibar	3	1	1	1	2	3	−1	4
Ethiopia	3	1	0	2	2	4	−2	3
Sudan	3	1	0	2	1	3	−2	3

== Top scorers (at the group stage) ==
5 goals

- (Tanzania) Mrisho Ngassa

4 goals

- (Tanzania) John Bocco

3 goals

- (Burundi) Selemani Ndikumana
- (Burundi) Christophe Nduwarugira
- (Malawi) Chiukepo Msowoya
- (Uganda) Brian Umony

2 goals

- (Kenya) Clifton Miheso
- (Kenya) David Ochieng
- (Rwanda) Dady Birori
- (Zanzibar) Khamis Mcha Khamis

1 goal

- (Burundi) Yusuf Ndikumana
- (Eritrea) Yosief Ghide
- (Eritrea) Hermon Tecleab
- (Ethiopia) Yonathan Kebede
- (Ethiopia) Elias Mamo
- (Kenya) Rama Salim
- (Malawi) Ndaziona Chatsalira
- (Malawi) Miciam Mhone
- (Rwanda) Jean-Baptiste Mugiraneza
- (Rwanda) Haruna Niyonzima
- (Rwanda) Tumaine Ntamuhanga
- (Somalia) Jabril Hassan Mohammed
- (Sudan) Farid Mohammed
- (Uganda) Geoffrey Kizito
- (Uganda) Hamis Kiiza
- (Uganda) Robert Ssentongo

As of 1 December 2012
