= 2012 Viva World Cup squads =

The 2012 VIVA World Cup was an international football tournament held in Iraqi Kurdistan from 4–9 June 2012. The 9 national teams involved in the tournament were required to register a squad of players; only players in these squads were eligible to take part.

Players' club teams as of 3 June 2012 – the tournament's opening day.

== Group A ==
=== Kurdistan ===
Coach: (Kurdistan Region) Abdullah Mahmud

No.	Pos.	Player	Date of birth (age)	Caps	Club
1	GK	Didar Hamid			(Iraq) Arbil FC
2	DF	Sherzad Mohamad			(Iraq) Arbil FC
3	DF	Mohamed Hama Khan			(Iraq) Brusk
4	DF	Herdi Siamand			(Iraq) Zaxo
5	DF	Khalid Musheer			(Iraq) Dohuk
6	MF	Halgurd Mulla Mohammed			(Iraq) Arbil FC
7	MF	Amad Ismael			(Iraq) Dohuk FC
8	MF	Xalid Mushir			(Iraq) Zaxo
9	FW	Nawzad Sherzad			(Iraq) Arbil FC
10	MF	Ali Aziz			(Iraq) Ararat
11	FW	Karzan Abdullah			(Iraq) Brusk
12	FW	Haider Qaraman			(Iraq) Arbil FC
13	MF	Barzan Shiraz			(Iraq) Arbil FC
14	MF	Ali Sirwan			(Iraq) Kirkuk
15	GK	Kawa Dino			(Iraq) Brusk
16	DF	Sabah Hasib			(Iraq) Brusk
17	MF	Kosret Bayiz			(Iraq) Arbil FC
18	DF	Amanj Karim			(Iraq) Arbil FC
19	FW	Salih Jaber			(Iraq) Zaxo
20	DF	Bayar Abubakir			(Iraq) Brusk

=== Occitania ===
Coach: (France) Didier Amiel

No.	Pos.	Player	Date of birth (age)	Caps	Club
1	GK	Romain Ellien			(France) Olympique Girou
2	DF	Anthony Meunier			(France) AS Canet
3	DF	Cédric Quéré			(France) Saint Gely du Fesc
4	DF	Alexis Bachmann			(France) Stade Seysses
5	DF	Christophe Dalzon			(France) AS Fabrègues
6	MF	Boris Massaré			(France) RCO Agde
7	MF	Jordan Amiel			(France) AS Puissalicon Magalas
8	MF	Renaud Thomas			(France) US Le Pontet
9	FW	Nicolas Flourens			(France) RCO Agde B
10	MF	Vivian Dors			(France) ES Paulhan
11	FW	Mickaël Bertini			(France) Unattached
12	FW	Jordan Patrac			(France) RCO Agde B
13	MF	Christophe Mouysset			(France) Saint Tiberi
14	MF	Valèri Aké			(France) RCO Agde B
15	GK	Nicolas Ferreres			(France) AS Puissalicon Magalas
16	DF	Gérôme Hernandez			(France) AS Puissalicon Magalas
17	FW	Guillaume Lafuente			(France) AS Fabrègues
18	DF	Aymeric Amiel			(France) AS Puissalicon Magalas
19	FW	Nicolas Desachy			(France) Unattached
20	FW	Brice Martinez			(France) AS Puissalicon Magalas

=== Western Sahara ===
Coach: (Western Sahara) Sidahmed Erguibi Ahmed Baba Haiai

No.	Pos.	Player	Date of birth (age)	Caps	Club
	GK	Mohamed Larbi			(Western Sahara)
		Saleh Abdelahi Abidin			(Western Sahara)
	MF	Said Mohamed Saleh Embarek			(Western Sahara)
		Mahfud Ualad Abdi			(Western Sahara)
	FW	Sahia Ahmed Budah			(Western Sahara)
	FW	Selma Iarba Malum			(Western Sahara)
	FW	Cori Maaruf	26		(Western Sahara)
		Mohamed El Mami			(Western Sahara)
		Moulay Aba Ali			(Western Sahara)
		Abdullah Bijah			(Western Sahara)
		Ba Boiah			(Western Sahara)

== Group B ==
=== Zanzibar ===
Coach: (Zanzibar) Hemed Suleiman

No.	Pos.	Player	Date of birth (age)	Caps	Club
1	GK	Ali Mwadini			(Tanzania) Azam
2	DF	Nadir Haroub			(Tanzania) Young Africans
3	DF	Othman Tamini			(Zanzibar)
4	DF	Wazir Salum			(Tanzania) Azam
5	DF	Aggrey Morris			(Tanzania) Azam
6	MF	Abdulhalim Humoud			(Tanzania) Simba SC
7	MF	Ismail Abdulghani Gulam			(Zanzibar) Malindi F.C.
8	MF	Abdi Kassim			(Vietnam) Đồng Tâm Long An
9	FW	Ali Badru			(Tanzania) Manyema F.C.
10	MF	Khamis Mcha			(Tanzania) Azam
11	FW	Amir Hamad Omar			(Zanzibar)
12	FW	Abdalla Juma			(Zanzibar)
13	MF	Abdalla Seif Ali			(Zanzibar)
14	MF	Omar Tamim			(Zanzibar) Miembeni S.C.
15	GK	Ali Mkanga			(Zanzibar)
16	DF	Juma Mmanga			(Zanzibar)
17	MF	Abbas Nassor			(Zanzibar)
18	DF	Ismael Khamis Amdur			(Zanzibar) Zimamoto
19	FW	Makame Mbwana			(Zanzibar)

=== Raetia ===
Coach: (Switzerland) Ursin Caviezel.

No.	Pos.	Player	Date of birth (age)	Caps	Club
1	GK	Patric Theus			(Switzerland) FC Ems
2	DF	Simone Fontana			(Switzerland) FC Riva
3	DF	Peter Bordin			(Switzerland) FC Aussersihl
4	DF	Alexandro Del Rio			(Switzerland) CB Union Trim
5	DF	Costantino Demenga			(Switzerland) FC Ems
6	MF	Michael Heini			(Switzerland) FC Ems
7	MF	Fabio Pocas Martins			(Switzerland) FC Ems
8	MF	Paul Gurt			(Switzerland) CB Union Trim
9	FW	Mirko Oswald			(Switzerland) CB Union Trim
10	MF	Thomas Hausmann			(Switzerland) SCR Scaletta
11	FW	Fabian Monn			(Switzerland) FC Haldenstein
12	GK	Andreas Felix			(Switzerland) SC Schwyz
13	MF	Marco Dudler			(Switzerland) FC Taminatal
14	FW	Roger Gruber			(Switzerland) CB Union Trim
15	DF	Nicola Quacci			(Switzerland) FC Riva

=== Tamil Eelam ===
Coach: (Tamil Eelam) Ragesh Nambiar

No.	Pos.	Player	Date of birth (age)	Caps	Club
1	GK	Selvananthan Hariendran			(England) Valvai Blues F.C.
3	DF	Ragesh Nambiar			(England) Santos Club
4	DF	Lakshman Vairavamoorthy			(England) Surbiton S FC
5	DF	Pushpalingam Kandavanam			(Canada) Canadian Tamil S.C.
6	MF	Krishanth Thavarajah			(Switzerland) Zug 94
7	FW	Venojan Raveetharan			
8	MF	Gajan Premkumar			(England) Mahajana Athletic
9	MF	Biraveen Nallathamby			(Switzerland) FC Affoltern
10	MF	Mahy Nambiar			
11	FW	Rosh Sri			(England) Sunrise United
12	MF	Menan Nagulendran			(Canada) Scarborough Rangers
13	DF	Arun Vigneswararajah			(Canada) York Region Shooters
14	MF	Sanjev Jayasingam			(Canada) Kilenburg Nobleton S.C.
15	MF	Rathish Nalliah			(England) East London Elite
14	MF	Janarthan Sadacharalingam			(Canada) Scarborough Azzuri Blues

== Group C ==
=== Northern Cyprus ===
Coach: (Northern Cyprus) Firat Canova

No.	Pos.	Player	Date of birth (age)	Caps	Club
1	GK	Hasan Piro			(Northern Cyprus) Çetinkaya
2	DF	Turkkan Delideniz			(Northern Cyprus) Cihangir GSK
3	DF	İbrahim Uludag			(Northern Cyprus) Mağusa Türk Gücü
4	DF	Serkan Önet			(Northern Cyprus) Çetinkaya
5	DF	Serhan Önet			(Northern Cyprus) Çetinkaya
6	DF	Erdoğ Barkınay			(Northern Cyprus) Yenicami A.S.K
7	MF	Mustafa Tekpinar			(Northern Cyprus) Cihangir GSK
8	MF	Erbay Beritz			(Northern Cyprus) B.Bağcıl S.K.
9	FW	Cagri Kiral			(Northern Cyprus) Kaymaklı S.K.
10	MF	Ersen Esmeraslan			(Northern Cyprus) Lefke TSK
11	MF	Erdinç Börekçi			(Northern Cyprus) Çetinkaya
12	DF	Huseyin Adal			(Northern Cyprus) Kaymaklı S.K.
13	FW	Hamis Çakır			(Northern Cyprus) Kaymaklı S.K.
14	MF	İbrahim Çıdamlı			(Northern Cyprus) Yenicami A.S.K
15	GK	Yasin Kurt			(Northern Cyprus) Kaymaklı S.K.
16	DF	Ahmet Coskun			(Northern Cyprus) Lapta T.B.S.K.
17	FW	Halil Turan			(Northern Cyprus) Cihangir GSK
18	FW	Mustafa Yaşinses			(Northern Cyprus) Kaymaklı S.K.
19	MF	Huseyin Kayalilar			(Northern Cyprus) Çetinkaya
20	DF	Ahmet Saygi			(Northern Cyprus) Doğan Türk Birliği
21	MF	Salih Güvensoy			(Northern Cyprus) Çetinkaya
22	FW	Kasim Tağman			(Northern Cyprus) Lefke TSK

=== Provence ===
Coach: (France) Philippe Burgio

No.	Pos.	Player	Date of birth (age)	Caps	Club
1	GK	Christopher Bosselet			(France) AS Gardanne
	DF	Soufiène Garbaa			
	DF	Kevin Barnel			(France) US Marseille Endoume
	MF	Samir Abbes			(France) US Pennoise
	MF	Omar			
	MF	Gaétan D'Acunto			(Israel) Hapoel Ra'anana
	MF	Nicolas Ferrero			
		Christophe Taba			
	FW	Yanis Abbes			(France) Unattached
		Malik Choaib			

=== Darfur ===
Coach: (United States) Mark Hodson

No.	Pos.	Player	Date of birth (age)	Caps	Club
1	FW	Yahya Adam			(Darfur)
2	DF	Youssef Abdala			(Darfur)
3	FW	Moubarak Duogom			(Darfur)
4	DF	Abdulbassit Soulyman			(Darfur)
5	MF	Sadam Dine			(Darfur)
6	MF	Saleh Yahya			(Darfur)
7	MF	Mohamed Inagy			(Darfur)
8	MF	Abobaker Ali			(Darfur)
9	MF	Mohamed Abdala			(Darfur)
10	DF	Mohamed Anour			(Darfur)
11	GK	Abdulhamid Gum			(Darfur)
12	DF	Mubarek Ahmed			(Darfur)
13	FW	Mubarag Ahmed			(Darfur)
14	FW	Sulieman Borma			(Darfur)
15	DF	Mohamed Dafalah			(Darfur)
16	GK	Ismail Abaker			(Darfur)
17	FW	Ammer Kherci			(Darfur)
