= Paul Were =

Kenyan footballer (born 1993)

Personal information
- Full name: Paul Were Ooko
- Date of birth: 8 October 1993 (age 33)
- Place of birth: Kakuma, Kenya
- Height: 1.77 m (5 ft 9 1/2 in)
- Position: Winger

Team information
- Current team: Egaleo
- Number: 11

Youth career
- FISA Academy
- –2009: Mathare Youth

Senior career*
Years	Team	Apps	(Gls)
2010–2012	Tusker		
2012–2014	A.F.C. Leopards		
2014–2015	AmaZulu	5	(0)
2015–2016	AEL Kalloni	10	(0)
2016–2017	Acharnaikos	7	(1)
2017–2018	Kalamata	11	(3)
2018–2019	Kaisar	25	(0)
2019	Trikala	5	(0)
2020–	Egaleo	7	(0)

International career^{‡}
2011–	Kenya	29	(3)
- * Club domestic league appearances and goals as of 18 August 2020 ‡ National team caps and goals as of 31 March 2017

Paul Were Ooko (Swahili pronunciation: [ˈwɛrɛ]; born 8 October 1993) is a Kenyan professional footballer who plays as a winger for Greek Football League club Egaleo and the Kenya national team.

== Club career ==
=== Kenyan Premier League ===
On 29 January 2010, Were joined Tusker from Mathare Youth ahead of the 2010 season. Spending two and a half seasons at the club, he helped the side win the Premier League title in 2011.

Halfway through Tusker's second consecutive title winning season, Were left the Brewers to join A.F.C. Leopards on 6 June 2012 on a one-year contract. He was named Man of the Match on his debut for Ingwe on 27 June, despite being substituted in the 75th minute by skipper Martin Imbalambala, putting in an outstanding performance that included an assist for Allan Wanga, who scored the only goal of the game against Sofapaka to earn his side all 3 points. The following season, Were played 55 minutes before coming off for Oscar Kadenge to help his side clinch their 9th President's Cup title.

On 10 February 2014, rumours of Were leaving for trials with an unnamed South African clubs began to surface. Four days later, it was reported that he was to trial with Premier Soccer League side Bidvest Wits, and consequently would not play in A.F.C. Leopards' CAF Confederation Cup second leg match away to Ethiopian side Defence, against whom he provided two assists to give his side the advantage ahead of the game on 9 February. He finished a five-day trial period with the Clever Boys on 21 February before returning to Ingwe for their Confederation Cup first round tie against SuperSport United. News involving two unnamed PSL clubs expressing an interest in signing Were also surfaced.

On 23 February, Were made his first Premier League appearance of the season for A.F.C. Leopards since returning from South Africa in a barren draw against Ulinzi Stars at the Nyayo National Stadium. However, it was reported that the Bidvest Wits continued to monitor the winger during the course of the season.

=== AmaZulu ===
On 16 July 2014, Were signed a three-year contract with AmaZulu in the South African Premier Division ahead of the 2014–15 season. In the aftermath of their relegation from the South African top flight, Were terminated his contract in June 2015 after only one season with the club.

=== Kalloni ===
On 20 August 2015, it was announced that Were signed a contract for Super League Greece side AEL Kalloni. The length of the contract was undisclosed.

=== Denizlispor ===
On 7 August 2016, Were joined Turkish side Denizlispor on a one-year deal.

== International career ==
Were earned his first call-up to the Kenya national team for an international friendly against South Africa on 9 February 2011. He made his senior international debut for the Harambee Stars as a substitute for Victor Wanyama, but could not help his side prevent a 2–0 loss to Bafana Bafana at the Royal Bafokeng Stadium in Rustenburg. He was also part of the squad that finished in second place at the 2012 CECAFA Cup, providing Edwin Lavatsa with an assist to level the scores at 1–1 in the final. However, he could not help his side stop Geoffrey Kizito's match-winning header only three minutes later.

On 6 February 2013, Were scored his first goal for his country in the 80th minute of an international friendly against Libya, sealing a 3–0 win for his side at the Stade Chedli Zouiten in Tunis, Tunisia.

=== International goals ===
Scores and results list Kenya's goal tally first.

#	Date	Venue	Opponent	Score	Result	Competition
1.	6 February 2013	Stade Chedli Zouiten, Tunis	Libya	3–0	3–0	International friendly
2.	14 June 2015	Stade Omnisport Marien Ngouabi, Owando	Congo	1–0	1–1	2017 Africa Cup of Nations qualification
3.	15 November 2016	Moi International Sports Centre, Nairobi	Liberia	1–0	1–0	International friendly

Source: National-Football-Teams.com
