= Atit =

Atit may refer to:

== Given name ==
- Atit Daosawang (born 1992), Thai footballer
- Atit Sheth (born 1996), Indian cricketer
- Atit Shah, producer of the 2015 film An Act of War

== Surname ==
- Mong Deng Atit (fl. 2012), South Sudanese footballer

== See also ==
- Ateet, a 2020 Indian Hindi-language film
