= Juma Kaseja =

Tanzanian footballer (born 1975)

Personal information
- Full name: Juma Kaseja Juma
- Date of birth: 20 April 1985 (age 41)
- Place of birth: Kigoma, Tanzania
- Height: 1.74 m (5 ft 9 in)
- Position: Goalkeeper

Team information
- Current team: KMC F.C.
- Number: 1

Youth career
- Makongo Dar es Salaam
- Serengeti Boys

Senior career*
Years	Team	Apps	(Gls)
2000–2003	Moro United		
2003–2014	Simba		
2014–2015	Young Africans		
2015–2017	Mbeya City		
2017–2018	Kagera Sugar		
2018–	Kinondoni Municipal Council		

International career^{‡}
2001–	Tanzania	67	(0)
- * Club domestic league appearances and goals as of 22:36, 6 June 2020 (UTC) ‡ National team caps and goals as of 22:36, 6 June 2020 (UTC)

Juma Kaseja Juma (born 20 April 1985) is a Tanzanian footballer who plays as a goalkeeper for Kinondoni Municipal Council F.C (KMC FC). He is also a member of the Tanzania national team. Kaseja initially competed with Simba leaving the club shortly after the season's conclusion. In his early years, he played with the Makongo Dar es Salaam and Serengeti Boys junior teams. Kaseja later registered with Moro United in 2000.

== Club career ==
In his early career, Kaseja attended Makongo Secondary School. He eventually played for their football team, Makongo Dar es Salaam. His performance at Makongo was followed by placement on the Serengeti Boys Under-17 team.

Kaseja signed with Moro United F.C. prior to the 2000–2001 season in Tanzanian football. He played his first two seasons completely, but was banned by the Tanzania Football Federation when he left to participate in the Gothia Cup, a youth football tournament based in Sweden. After the events at Morogoro, the goalkeeper transferred to Simba S.C. in the Tanzanian Premier League. He became an active member of the team beginning from 2009. On November 11, 2013, Kaseja was signed by Young Africans S.C., who were playing in the top tier of Tanzanian football as well.

== International career ==
Kaseja represents Tanzania on international duty. He joined the national team in the year of 2001, holding the position as the second-string goalkeeper. After staying on the squad for more seasons, Kaseja won the starting job. However, his name was later dropped from the team's roster for nearly three years. Danish football manager Jan B. Poulsen, who had managed several other teams such as Armenia and Singapore, helped in recalling him back to the squad. Kaseja helped the national team win their third title after his country hosted the 2010 CECAFA Cup, defeating Ivory Coast in the final match. In the 2012 CECAFA Cup semifinals against Uganda, Kaseja infamously made a pivotal blunder after dropping a potential save against the goal attempt by Robert Ssentongo.
