= 2008 CECAFA Cup =

2008 CECAFA Senior Challenge Cup
Tournament details
- Host country: Uganda
- Dates: 31 December 2008 – 13 January 2009
- Teams: 10 (from CECAFA confederations)

Final positions
- Champions: Uganda (10th title)
- Runners-up: Kenya
- Third place: Tanzania

Tournament statistics
- Matches played: 24
- Goals scored: 60 (2.5 per match)
- Top scorer(s): (Uganda) Bryan Omwony (5 goals)

The 2008 CECAFA Cup was the 32nd edition of the football tournament that involves teams from East and Central Africa.

All matches were played from 31 December 2008 to 13 January 2009 at the National Stadium, Kampala, Uganda.

== Information ==
- originally scheduled for 8 November till 22 November in Kampala; postponed to January 2009 because some of the competing countries were yet to meet conditions set by GTV, the main sponsors.
- The winner of this year's competition will receive $30,000, the second-placed team will be given $20,000, with $10,000 going to the side that comes third.
- Ethiopia left out due to FIFA suspension
- Eritrea pulled out due to administrative wrangles in the home federation. They were replaced by Zambia.

== Group A ==
Team	Pld	W	D	L	GF	GA	GD	Pts
Uganda	4	3	1	0	10	1	+9	10
Tanzania	4	2	0	2	5	4	+1	6
Rwanda	4	2	0	2	6	6	0	6
Zanzibar	4	1	1	2	3	5	−2	4
Somalia	4	1	0	3	1	9	−8	3

1 January 2009

Zanzibar	2–0	Somalia
Morris 23', 90' (pen.)

Mandela National Stadium, Kampala
1 January 2009

Rwanda	0–4	Uganda
		Mawejje 59'; Massa 68' (pen.); Omwony 85'; Bengo 87'

Mandela National Stadium, Kampala
3 January 2009

Uganda	0–0	Zanzibar

Nakivubo Stadium, Kampala
3 January 2009

Somalia	1–0	Tanzania
Abshir 14'

Nakivubo Stadium, Kampala
5 January 2009

Tanzania	2–1	Zanzibar
Mrwanda 13'; Idd 78'		Haroub 21'

Nakivubo Stadium, Kampala
5 January 2009

Rwanda	3–0	Somalia
Gesana 67', 85'; Bokota 87'

Mandela National Stadium, Kampala
7 January 2009

Uganda	4–0	Somalia
Mawejje 31', 39', 65'; Massa 75'

Mandela National Stadium, Kampala
7 January 2009

Rwanda	0–2	Tanzania
		Ngassa 10'; Iddy 44'

Mandela National Stadium, Kampala
9 January 2009

Uganda	2–1	Tanzania

Mandela National Stadium, Kampala
9 January 2009

Rwanda	3–0	Zanzibar

Mandela National Stadium, Kampala

== Group B ==
Team	Pld	W	D	L	GF	GA	GD	Pts
Kenya	4	2	2	0	6	1	+5	8
Burundi	4	2	1	1	6	2	+4	7
Sudan	4	1	2	1	3	2	+1	5
Zambia	4	1	2	1	4	3	+1	5
Djibouti	4	0	1	3	2	13	−11	1

31 December 2008

Sudan	0–0	Kenya

Bugembe Stadium, Jinja
31 December 2008

Zambia	3–0	Djibouti
Singouluma 25', 40'; Sakuwaha 43'

Bugembe Stadium, Jinja
2 January 2009

Kenya	0–0	Zambia

Bugembe Stadium, Jinja
2 January 2009

Djibouti	0–4	Burundi
		Gatoto 5', 8'; Nahimana 55', 78'

Bugembe Stadium, Jinja
4 January 2009

Sudan	1–1	Djibouti
Elmahi 19'		Daher 52'

Bugembe Stadium, Jinja
4 January 2009

Zambia	1–1	Burundi
Kola 57'		Nahimana 90+1'

Bugembe Stadium, Jinja
6 January 2009

Djibouti	1–5	Kenya
Mahdi 60'		Ouma 4', 15', 90+3'; Shikokoti 47'; Owino 90+2'

Bugembe Stadium, Jinja
6 January 2009

Burundi	1–0	Sudan
Catoto 7'

Bugembe Stadium, Jinja
8 January 2009

Zambia	0–2	Sudan
		Ammari 33'; Elmahi 62'

Nakivubo Stadium, Kampala
8 January 2009

Burundi	0–1	Kenya
		Monday 60' (pen.)

Nakivubo Stadium, Kampala

=== Semi finals ===
11 January 2009

Kenya	2–1	Tanzania
Ouma 18'; Baraza 21'		Mrwanda 79'

National Stadium, Kampala
11 January 2009

Uganda	5–0	Burundi
Umony 30', 83'; Mwesigwa 45'; Bengo 53'; Massa 62'

National Stadium, Kampala

=== Third place play-off ===
13 January 2009

Tanzania	3–2	Burundi
Ngassa 2'; Khalfan 68'; Mrwanda 73'		Imantona 4' (pen.); Jumapili 42'

National Stadium, Kampala

=== Final ===
13 January 2009

Kenya	0–1	Uganda
		Omwony 16'

National Stadium, Kampala

CECAFA Cup 2008 winners

Uganda
Tenth title

== Top goalscorers ==
Player	Nationality	Goals	Against	Penalties	Against
Bryan Omwony	Uganda	5	Rwanda (1); Tanzania (1); Burundi (2); Kenya (1)		
Francis Ouma	Kenya	3	Djibouti (3)		
Aggrey Morris	Zanzibar	2	Somalia (2)	1	Somalia (1)
Given Singuluma	Zambia	2	Djibouti (2)		
Jonas Sakuwaha	Zambia	1	Djibouti (1)		
Rodgers Kola	Zambia	1	Burundi (1)		
Tony Mawejje	Uganda	1	Rwanda (1)		
Simeon Massa	Uganda	1	Rwanda (1)	1	Rwanda (1)
Bryan Omwony	Uganda	1	Rwanda (1)		
Stephen Bengo	Uganda	1	Rwanda (1)		
Cisse Abshir	Somalia	1	Tanzania (1)		
