= Edwin Lavatsa =

Kenyan footballer (born 1993)

Personal information
- Full name: Edwin Lavatsa
- Date of birth: 2 January 1993 (age 33)
- Place of birth: Nairobi, Kenya
- Height: 1.90 m (6 ft 3 in)
- Position: Forward

Team information
- Current team: Kakamega Homeboys
- Number: 45

Youth career
- –2011: Upper Hill School

Senior career*
Years	Team	Apps	(Gls)
2011–2013	Gor Mahia		
2014	MC Alger	4	(0)
2015	Mathare United		
2016–	Bandari		

International career^{‡}
2012–	Kenya	17	(3)
- * Club domestic league appearances and goals as of 8 January 2016 ‡ National team caps and goals as of 3 August 2014

Edwin Lavatsa (born 3 January 1993) is a Kenyan footballer who plays for Kakamega Homeboys in the Kenyan Premier League and the Kenya national team as a forward.

Lavatsa spent three seasons with Gor Mahia, with whom he won the league title in 2013, before moving to Algerian Ligue Professionnelle 1 side MC Alger for half a season before being released. He joined Mathare United in 2015 and spent one season at the club before moving to Bandari, where he clinched silverware on his competitive debut at the 2016 Kenyan Super Cup. He has also appeared for the Kenya national team, and was part of the squad that won the 2013 CECAFA Cup Final, helping his side to a 2–0 win against Sudan to win the title.

== Club career ==
=== Gor Mahia ===
Lavatsa joined Gor Mahia ahead of the 2011 season after graduating from Upper Hill School. He made his first appearance for the club at the Nyayo National Stadium against Posta Rangers on 26 February 2011, and scored his first goal for the club in a 3–1 win against Thika United on 17 April the same year. He went on to make several more appearances for the club, helping them win the FKL Cup in 2011, the President's Cup and the Top 8 Cup in 2012, and the league and super cup double in 2013.

=== MC Alger ===
Lavatsa joined MC Alger from Gor Mahia on 11 January 2014 for the second half of the 2013–14 Ligue Professionnelle 1 season. It was reported that he signed a contract for around €10,000 (approx. KSh.1.2 million/=) a month.

Lavatsa made his debut for the seven-time Algerian champions on 1 February 2014, coming on as a substitute for Hadj Bouguèche in the 69th minute of a 1–0 loss away to Aïn Fakroun. The following week, he made his first start for the club and played the full 90 minutes to help his side to a 2–0 home victory against MC Oran at the Stade Omar Hamadi in Bologhine.

On 1 May 2014, Lavatsa bagged his first silverware with the Algiers club, albeit remaining an unused substitute, after a 4–3 penalty shoot-out victory in the 2013–14 Algerian Cup final against JS Kabylie, who had held them to a 1–1 draw after 90 minutes and extra time. On 10 July 2014, it was announced that Lavatsa had been released by the club barely six months into his two-year contract. He was among 14 players released ahead of the 2014–15 season.

=== Mathare United ===
On 25 June 2015, it was announced that Lavatsa made a return to the Kenyan Premier League and signed for Mathare United. He made his debut for the side in a league match against his former club Gor Mahia, providing Eric Jonana with an assist in the 30th minute to help his side to a 1–1 draw.

=== Bandari ===
On 8 January 2016, it was announced that Lavatsa joined coastal side Bandari on a one-year contract after being released by Mathare United. He made his competitive debut for the club in the 2016 Kenyan Super Cup match against his former club Gor Mahia, starting the match and playing all 90 minutes to help his side to a 1–0 win for their first title in the competition.

== International career ==
Lavatsa received his first call-up to the Kenya national team by being named in their 2012 CECAFA Cup squad. He made his first appearance for the side in the group stage against South Sudan. He made four more appearances during the tournament on the way to the final, where he scored his first international goal in the 87th minute to level the scores at 1–1 against Uganda after tapping in from a Paul Were pass. However, he could not help his side prevent Geoffrey Kizito from heading in the winner just three minutes later.

Lavatsa made his first FIFA appearance in a 2014 World Cup qualifier against Nigeria at the U.J. Esuene Stadium in Calabar, Nigeria as a substitute. On 9 July, he scored a brace to hand Kenya a 2–0 win against Swaziland at the Arthur Davies Stadium in Kitwe, Zambia in their second match of the 2013 COSAFA Cup, but could not save his side from elimination two days later when his side fell to a 2–1 loss against Botswana at the Nkana Stadium.

Later that year, he made five appearances to help his side clinch the 2013 CECAFA Cup on home soil. He played the full 90 minutes in the 2–0 win against Sudan at the Nyayo National Stadium.

=== International goals ===
#	Date	Venue	Opponent	Score	Result	Competition
1.	8 December 2012	Namboole Stadium, Kampala	Uganda	1–1	2–1	2012 CECAFA Cup
2.	9 July 2013	Arthur Davies Stadium, Kitwe	Swaziland	1–0	2–0	2013 COSAFA Cup
3.	9 July 2013	Arthur Davies Stadium, Kitwe	Swaziland	2–0	2–0	2013 COSAFA Cup

== Honours ==
=== Club ===
Gor Mahia

- Kenyan Premier League: 2013
- FKL Cup/President's Cup: 2011, 2012
- Kenyan Super Cup: 2013 (pre-season)
- Top 8 Cup: 2012

MC Alger

- Algerian Cup: 2013–14

Bandari

- Kenyan Super Cup: 2016

=== International ===
- CECAFA Cup: 2013
