= Kyetume FC =

Association football club in Uganda

Kyetume
- Full name: Kyetume Football Club
- Nickname(s): The Slaughters The Red Bulls
- Ground: Nakisunga Saaza Ground, Mukono
- Capacity: 1,000
- Manager: George Nsinga
- League: Uganda Premier League
- 2018–19: FUFA Big League, promoted
colours

Kyetume Football Club is a football club from Mukono, Uganda currently playing in the Uganda Premier League.

== History ==
=== 2018–19 ===
With three months left in the 2018–19 FUFA Big League season, Kyetume FC hired coach Allen Kabonge on a three-month contract to push for promotion. Kabonge is best known for taking four different second division Ugandan sides to the top flight.

Kyetume eventually qualified for the FUFA Big League playoffs. Robert Ssentongo scored a hat trick for Kyetume in the promotion playoff finals, which the club won 4–1 over Kansai Plascon, earning them a spot in the Ugandan top flight for the first time in their history.

Kyetume hired George "Best" Nsinga to be their coach for the 2019–20 top flight season. Jackson Mayanja currently serves as their head coach.

== Ground ==
Kyetume plays at the Nakisunga Saaza Ground, which has a capacity of about 1,000.
