= Jonas Sakuwaha =

Zambian footballer (born 1983)

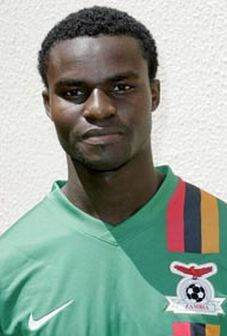
- Jonas Sakuwaha

Personal information
- Date of birth: 22 July 1983 (age 43)
- Place of birth: Kafue, Zambia
- Height: 1.82 m (6 ft 0 in)
- Position: Winger

Senior career*
Years	Team	Apps	(Gls)
2006–2009	ZESCO United		
2009–2010	Lorient	14	(0)
2010	→ Le Havre (loan)	4	(0)
2011–2012	Al-Merrikh	33	(22)
2013–2014	TP Mazembe	29	(14)
2014–2015	ZESCO United		
2015–2017	TP Mazembe		
2017	Buildcon		
2017–2018	Oman Club		

International career
2006–2014	Zambia	26	(2)
- * Club domestic league appearances and goals

Jonas Sakuwaha (born 22 July 1983) is a Zambian former professional footballer who played as a winger. He made 25 appearances scoring 2 goals for the Zambia national team between 2006 and 2014.

== Club career ==
Sakuwaha began his career with ZESCO United.

Sakuwaha moved to French side FC Lorient on 1 September 2009. He signed on loan for Le Havre for the 2010–11 season, before moving to Sudan to play with Al-Merrikh for the 2011 season. He signed with Congolese club TP Mazembe in January 2013.

Sakuwaha returned to Zambia joining ZESCO United for the 2014 season.

In early 2017 he signed with Buildcon, newly promoted to the Zambian Premier League. A year later, he was released by the club.

== International career ==
Sakuwaha made his international debut for Zambia in 2006. He played at the 2008 CECAFA Cup and the 2009 African Championship of Nations, but rejected a call-up to the squad for the 2010 Africa Cup of Nations. He was called up to Zambia's 23-man squad for the 2013 Africa Cup of Nations.

== Career statistics ==
=== International ===
Appearances and goals by national team and year
National team	Year	Apps	Goals
Zambia	2006	4	1
Zambia	2007	–	
Zambia	2008	2	1
Zambia	2009	6	0
Zambia	2010	3	0
Zambia	2011	–	
Zambia	2012	5	0
Zambia	2013	4	0
Zambia	2014	2	0
Total		26	2

Scores and results list Zambia's goal tally first, score column indicates score after each Sakuwaha goal.

List of international goals scored by Jonas Sakuwaha
No.	Date	Venue	Opponent	Score	Result	Competition
1	5 December 2006	Addis Ababa Stadium, Addis Ababa, Ethiopia	Ethiopia	1–0	1–0	2006 CECAFA Cup
2	31 December 2008	Bugembe Stadium, Jinja, Uganda	Djibouti	3–0	3–0	2008 CECAFA Cup
