= Stephen Bengo =

Ugandan footballer

Personal information
- Place of birth: Lubaga, Uganda
- Positions: Midfielder; left winger

Stephen Bengo (born December 24, 1988 (age 37)) is a retired Ugandan professional footballer who played as amidfielder. He was born in Lubaga, Uganda.

== Career ==
He featured for Sports Club among Villa, URA FC, and the Uganda national team (Uganda Cranes). Bengo announced his retirement from professional football due to medical reasons after cardiac tests conducted during a prospective move to KCCA FC indicated a heart condition.

Season	Club	Country	Notes
2006–2009	Sports Club Villa	Uganda	Early professional career; multiple seasons at Villa.
2009–2010	Young Africans SC	Tanzania	Transferred from Villa.
2010–2011	URA FC	Uganda	Returned to Uganda with URA.
2011–2013	Sports Club Villa	Uganda	Rejoined Villa.
2013–2014	Kampala Capital City Authority FC	Uganda	Short stint with KCCA.
2014–2015	Sports Club Villa	Uganda	Returned again to Villa.
2015–2016	Soana FC	Uganda	Signed one-year contract.
2016–2017	Without club	—	Free agent period.
2017–2018	Express FC	Uganda	Joined Express.
2018–2019	Wakiso Giants FC	Uganda	Played in FUFA Big League / Uganda Premier League.
July 2019	Retired	—	Retirement from professional football.

== Achievements ==
=== CECAFA Cup ===
- Winner: 2008
