= Manyema F.C. =

Manyema FC is a football club in Dar es Salaam, Tanzania. . They play in the top level of Tanzanian professional football, the Tanzanian Premier League.
