= Miskeen Emmanuel =

South Sudanese footballer

Personal information
- Full name: Miskeen Emmanuel
- Position: Defender

International career
Years	Team	Apps	(Gls)
2012–	South Sudan	3	(0)

Miskeen Emmanuel is a South Sudanese footballer who currently plays as a defender.

== International career ==
He made three senior appearances for South Sudan against Ethiopia, Kenya and Uganda in the 2012 CECAFA Cup. He received a yellow card against Uganda.
