= Yonathan Kebede =

Ethiopian footballer

Personal information
- Full name: Yonathan Kebede
- Date of birth: 12 August 1991 (age 35)
- Place of birth: Addis Ababa, Ethiopia
- Position: Striker

Team information
- Current team: EEPCO Addis Ababa

Senior career*
Years	Team	Apps	(Gls)
2012–	EEPCO Addis Ababa	?	(?)

International career
2012–	Ethiopia	3	(1)
- * Club domestic league appearances and goals

Yonathan Kebede (born 12 August 1991) is an Ethiopian soccer player who made his international debut against South Sudan in the 2012 CECAFA Cup, scoring on his international debut. He currently plays for EEPCO Addis Ababa as a forward. He was named in Ethiopia's provisional squad for the 2013 Africa Cup of Nations.
