= Clifton Miheso =

Kenyan footballer (born 1996)

Clifton Mihesh
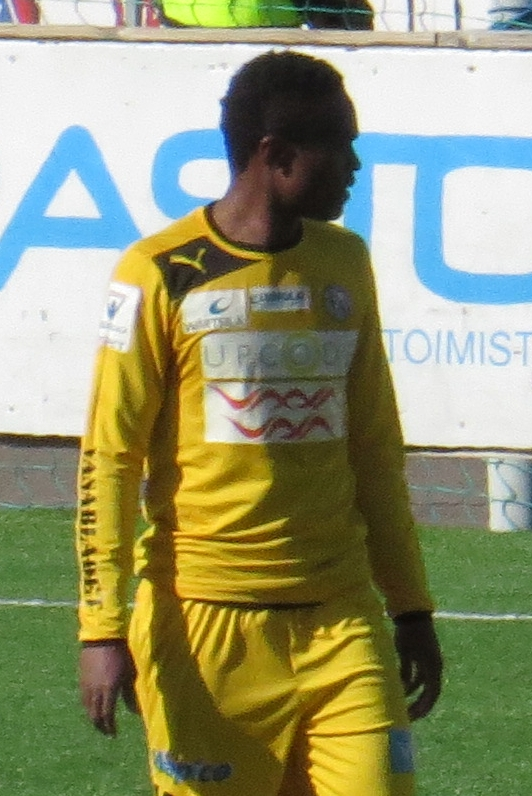
- Miheso with VPS in 2015

Personal information
- Full name: Clifton Miheso Ayisi
- Place of birth: Kakamega, Kenya
- Height: 1.77 m (5 ft 9 1/2 in)
- Position: Winger

Team information
- Current team: A.F.C Leopards
- Number: 23

Senior career*
Years	Team	Apps	(Gls)
2011–2013	Thika United		
2013–2015	Sofapaka	28	(6)
2015	VPS	10	(0)
2016	A.F.C. Leopards	16	(5)
2016–2017	Golden Arrows	11	(0)
2017–2019	Buildcon FC	22	(4)
2019	Olímpico Montijo	3	(0)
2019–2021	Gor Mahia	38	(13)
2021–2023	Kenya Police	56	(19)

International career^{‡}
2012–	Kenya	40	(7)
- * Club domestic league appearances and goals as of 21:37, 21 December 2019 (UTC) ‡ National team caps and goals as of 26 March 2018

Clifton Miheso Ayisi (born 5 February 1996), sometimes mistakenly known as Clifford Miheso, is a Kenyan footballer who currently plays as a winger for A.F.C. Leopards and the Kenya national team.

== Club career ==
=== Early career ===
Miheso was born in Kakamega, Kenya, in a middle-class family. He began his career in the Kenyan Premier League, where he played for Thika United from 2011 to 2013, before joining Sofapaka and spending a further three seasons with the club.

=== VPS ===
On 5 March 2015, it was announced that Miheso joined Finnish Veikkausliiga side Vaasan Palloseura (VPS), signing a one-year contract after spending three months with the club on trial.

=== A.F.C. Leopards ===
On 31 January 2016, it was announced that Miheso would return to Kenya, joining Premier League giants A.F.C. Leopards on a six-month contract.

=== Golden Arrows ===
On 4 July 2016, Miheso joined South African side Golden Arrows ahead of the 2016–17 season. He made his debut on 24 August 2016 in a 3–1 loss to Kaizer Chiefs coming in a substitute in the 62nd minute.

=== Buildcon Football Club ===
In March 2017, Clifton Miheso signed in Builddon FC in Zambian Superleague.

== International career ==
Miheso made his debut for the Kenya national team in a friendly match against Egypt on 27 February 2012. He scored his first goal for the Harambee Stars in a 5–0 friendly win over Botswana on 27 July 2012. Miheso was on the squad that reached the final of the 2012 CECAFA Cup in Uganda, as well as the squad that won the title the following year on home soil.

=== International goals ===
Scores and results list Kenya's goal tally first.

No	Date	Venue	Opponent	Score	Result	Competition
1.	12 July 2012	Nyayo National Stadium, Nairobi	Botswana	1–0	3–1	Friendly
2.	12 July 2012	Nyayo National Stadium, Nairobi	Botswana	2–0	3–1	Friendly
3.	27 November 2012	Mandela National Stadium, Kampala	South Sudan	2–0	2–0	2012 CECAFA Cup
4.	30 November 2012	Mandela National Stadium, Kampala	Ethiopia	2–0	3–1	2012 CECAFA Cup
5.	10 December 2013	Nyayo National Stadium, Nairobi	Tanzania	1–0	1–0	2013 CECAFA Cup
6.	24 March 2018	Stade de Marrakech, Marrakesh	Comoros	2–2	2–2	Friendly
7.	2 June 2018	Mumbai Football Arena, Mumbai	New Zealand	1–1	2–1	2018 Intercontinental Cup
