= Hamza Muwonge =

Ugandan footballer (born 1982)

Personal information
- Full name: Hamza Mulindwa Muwonge
- Date of birth: 6 November 1982 (age 43)
- Place of birth: Kampala, Uganda
- Height: 1.83 m (6 ft 0 in)
- Position: Goalkeeper

Team information
- Current team: Bright Stars

Senior career*
Years	Team	Apps	(Gls)
2004	Ggaba United		
2005	Kampala United		
2006	Simba		
2007–2014	Bunamwaya / Vipers		
2014–2016	Thika United		
2017–	Bright Stars		

International career^{‡}
2007–	Uganda	27	(0)
- * Club domestic league appearances and goals as of 15:50, 9 March 2018 (UTC) ‡ National team caps and goals as of 15:50, 9 March 2018 (UTC)

Hamza Mulindwa Muwonge (born 6 November 1982) is a Ugandan international footballer who plays for Bright Stars, as a goalkeeper.

== Career ==
Born in Kampala, Muwonge has played club football for Ggaba United, Kampala United, Simba, Bunamwaya / Vipers, Thika United, and Bright Stars.

He made his international debut for Uganda in 2007, and has appeared in FIFA World Cup qualifying matches for them.
