= Imran Nshimiyimana =

Rwandan footballer

Personal information
- Date of birth: 18 August 1994 (age 32)
- Place of birth: Kigali, Rwanda
- Height: 1.90 m (6 ft 3 in)
- Position: Midfielder

Team information
- Current team: AS Kigali

Senior career*
| Years | Team | Apps | (Gls) |
| 2010–2012 | AS Kigali | | |
| 2012–2016 | Police | | |
| 2016– | AS Kigali | | |

International career^{‡}
| 2012– | Rwanda | 19 | (0) |
- * Club domestic league appearances and goals as of 18:18, 8 March 2018 (UTC) ‡ National team caps and goals as of 18:18, 8 March 2018 (UTC)

Imran Nshimiyimana (born 18 August 1994) is a Rwandan international footballer who plays for AS Kigali, as a midfielder.

== Career ==
Born in Kigali, Nshimiyimana has played for AS Kigali and Police.

He made his senior international debut for the Rwandan national team in 2012, and has appeared in FIFA World Cup qualifying matches for them.
