= Amri Kiemba =

Tanzanian footballer

Personal information
- Full name: Amri Kiemba Ramadhan
- Date of birth: 17 June 1983 (age 43)
- Place of birth: Tanzania
- Position: Midfielder

Team information
- Current team: Simba

Senior career*
Years	Team	Apps	(Gls)
2008–2009	Moro United		
2009–	Simba SC		

International career^{‡}
2012–	Tanzania	31	(6)
- * Club domestic league appearances and goals ‡ National team caps and goals as of 13:17, 20 June 2015 (UTC)

Amri Kiemba Ramadhan is a retired Tanzanian footballer who plays club football for Simba and international football Tanzania.

== International career ==
=== International goals ===
Scores and results list Tanzania's goal tally first.

Goal	Date	Venue	Opponent	Score	Result	Competition
1.	3 December 2012	Lugogo Stadium, Kampala, Uganda	Rwanda	1–0	2–0	2012 CECAFA Cup
2.	8 June 2013	Stade de Marrakech, Marrakesh, Morocco	Morocco	1–2	1–2	2014 FIFA World Cup qualification
3.	16 June 2013	National Stadium, Dar es Salaam, Tanzania	Ivory Coast	1–0	2–4	2014 FIFA World Cup qualification
4.	27 July 2013	Mandela National Stadium, Kampala, Uganda	Uganda	1–1	1–3	2014 African Nations Championship qualification
5.	27 May 2014	National Stadium, Dar es Salaam, Tanzania	Malawi	1–0	1–0	Friendly
6.	12 October 2014	National Stadium, Dar es Salaam, Tanzania	Benin	2–0	4–1	Friendly
