= Raphael Bocco =

Tanzanian international footballer

Personal information
- Full name: John Raphael Bocco
- Date of birth: 5 August 1989 (age 37)
- Place of birth: Dar es Salaam, Tanzania
- Height: 1.88 m (6 ft 2 in)
- Position: Striker

Team information
- Current team: JKT Tanzania

Senior career*
Years	Team	Apps	(Gls)
2008–2017	Azam		
2017–2024	Simba		
2024–	JKT Tanzania		

International career^{‡}
2009–	Tanzania	74	(14)
- * Club domestic league appearances and goals as of 17:54, 15 September 2025 (UTC) ‡ National team caps and goals as of 10:00, 6 April 2024 (UTC)

John Raphael Bocco (born 5 August 1989) is a Tanzanian international footballer who plays for JKT Tanzania, as a striker.

== Club career ==
Born in Dar es Salaam, Bocco began his career with Azam for nearly 10 years.

He signed a two-year contract with Simba in June 2017. He signed a new two-year contract in April 2021.

In July 2024 he signed for JKT Tanzania.

== International career ==
He made his senior international debut for Tanzania in 2009, and has appeared in FIFA World Cup qualifying matches.

=== International goals ===
Scores and results list Tanzania's goal tally first.

Goal	Date	Venue	Opponent	Score	Result	Competition
1.	8 November 2009	Ali Mohsen Al-Muraisi Stadium, Sana'a, Yemen	Yemen	1–0	1–1	Friendly
2.	8 December 2009	Nyayo National Stadium, Nairobi, Kenya	Eritrea	1–0	4–0	2009 CECAFA Cup
3.	30 November 2010	National Stadium, Dar es Salaam, Tanzania	Somalia	2–0	3–0	2010 CECAFA Cup
4.	25 November 2012	Mandela National Stadium, Kampala, Uganda	Sudan	1–0	2–0	2012 CECAFA Cup
5.	25 November 2012	Mandela National Stadium, Kampala, Uganda	Sudan	2–0	2–0	2012 CECAFA Cup
6.	1 December 2012	Lugogo Stadium, Kampala, Uganda	Somalia	3–0	7–0	2012 CECAFA Cup
7.	1 December 2012	Lugogo Stadium, Kampala, Uganda	Somalia	4–0	7–0	2012 CECAFA Cup
8.	3 December 2012	Lugogo Stadium, Kampala, Uganda	Rwanda	2–0	2–0	2012 CECAFA Cup
9.	18 May 2014	National Stadium, Dar es Salaam, Tanzania	Zimbabwe	1–0	1–0	2015 Africa Cup of Nations qualification
10.	1 July 2014	Botswana National Stadium, Gaborone, Botswana	Botswana	2–4	2–4	Friendly
11.	4 July 2015	Nakivubo Stadium, Kampala, Uganda	Uganda	1–0	1–1	2016 African Nations Championship qualification
12.	22 November 2015	Addis Ababa Stadium, Addis Ababa, Ethiopia	Somalia	1–0	4–0	2015 CECAFA Cup
13.	22 November 2015	Addis Ababa Stadium, Addis Ababa, Ethiopia	Somalia	4–0	4–0	2015 CECAFA Cup
14.	30 November 2015	Addis Ababa Stadium, Addis Ababa, Ethiopia	Ethiopia	1–0	1–1	2015 CECAFA Cup
