= Moges Tadesse =

Ethiopian footballer

Personal information
- Full name: Moges Tadesse
- Date of birth: 28 June 1993 (age 33)
- Place of birth: Addis Ababa, Ethiopia
- Position: Defender

Team information
- Current team: Adama City

Youth career
- –2012: Ethiopian Coffee

Senior career*
Years	Team	Apps	(Gls)
2012–2015	Ethiopian Coffee		
2015–	Adama City		

International career^{‡}
2012–	Ethiopia	6	(0)
- * Club domestic league appearances and goals as of 15 June 2013 ‡ National team caps and goals as of 15 June 2013

Moges Tadesse (Amharic: ሞገስ ጣደስሰ, born 28 June 1993) is an Ethiopian footballer who plays as a defender for Ethiopian Coffee.
