= Mwinyi Kazimoto =

Tanzanian footballer

Personal information
- Full name: Mwinyi Kazimoto
- Date of birth: 25 December 1988 (age 37)
- Place of birth: Dodoma, Tanzania
- Position: Midfielder

Team information
- Current team: Simba
- Number: 17

Senior career*
Years	Team	Apps	(Gls)
2007–2011	JKT Ruvu Stars		
2011–2012	Simba		
2013–2015	Al Markhiya		
2015–present	Simba SC Simba		

International career^{‡}
2009–	Tanzania	43	(6)
- * Club domestic league appearances and goals as of 2014- ‡ National team caps and goals as of 4 June 2016

Mwinyi Kazimoto (born 25 December 1988) is a Tanzanian footballer. He plays as a midfielder for Al Markhiya in the Qatari Second Division. He was a member of the Tanzania national football team at the 2013 Africa Cup of Nations qualification.

== International career ==
=== International goals ===
Scores and results list Tanzania's goal tally first.

Goal	Date	Venue	Opponent	Score	Result	Competition
1.	3 June 2009	National Stadium, Dar es Salaam, Tanzania	New Zealand	2–1	2–1	Friendly
2.	29 November 2011	National Stadium, Dar es Salaam, Tanzania	Djibouti	2–0	3–0	2011 CECAFA Cup
3.	3 December 2011	National Stadium, Dar es Salaam, Tanzania	Zimbabwe	2–1	2–1	2011 CECAFA Cup
4.	29 February 2012	National Stadium, Dar es Salaam, Tanzania	Mozambique	1–1	1–1	2013 Africa Cup of Nations qualification
5.	15 August 2012	Molepolole Stadium, Molepolole, Botswana	Botswana	2–1	3–3	Friendly
6.	8 December 2012	Mandela National Stadium, Kampala, Uganda	Zanzibar	1–0	1–1	2012 CECAFA Cup
