= Christophe Nduwarugira =

Burundian footballer (born 1994)

Personal information
- Full name: Christophe Lucio Nduwarugira
- Date of birth: 22 June 1994 (age 32)
- Place of birth: Bujumbura, Burundi
- Height: 1.86 m (6 ft 1 in)
- Positions: Defensive midfielder; centre-back

Team information
- Current team: PSS Sleman
- Number: 55

Senior career*
| Years | Team | Apps | (Gls) |
| 2011–2013 | LLB Académic | | |
| 2014–2018 | Chibuto | | |
| 2017–2018 | → União da Madeira (loan) | 23 | (1) |
| 2018–2020 | Amora | 16 | (1) |
| 2019–2020 | → Varzim (loan) | 19 | (0) |
| 2020–2022 | Leixões | 56 | (0) |
| 2022–2024 | Académico de Viseu | 44 | (0) |
| 2024–2026 | Borneo Samarinda | 65 | (3) |
| 2026– | PSS Sleman | 1 | (0) |

International career^{‡}
| 2012– | Burundi | 55 | (7) |
- * Club domestic league appearances and goals as of 4 September 2026 ‡ National team caps and goals as of 31 March 2026

Christophe Lucio Nduwarugira (born 22 June 1994) is a Burundian professional footballer who plays as a defensive midfielder or centre-back for Super League club PSS Sleman.

== International career ==
Nduwarugira was invited by Lofty Naseem, the national team coach, to represent Burundi in the 2014 African Nations Championship held in South Africa.

=== International goals ===
As of 25 March 2025.

| No. | Date | Venue | Opponent | Score | Result | Competition |
|---|---|---|---|---|---|---|
| 1. | 25 November 2012 | Namboole National Stadium, Kampala, Uganda | Somalia | 1–0 | 5–1 | 2012 CECAFA Cup |
| 2. | 25 November 2012 | Namboole National Stadium, Kampala, Uganda | Somalia | 4–1 | 5–1 | 2012 CECAFA Cup |
| 3. | 1 December 2012 | Namboole National Stadium, Kampala, Uganda | Sudan | 1–0 | 1–0 | 2012 CECAFA Cup |
| 4. | 28 November 2013 | Kenyatta Stadium, Machakos, Kenya | Somalia | 1–0 | 2–0 | 2013 CECAFA Cup |
| 5. | 18 January 2014 | Peter Mokaba Stadium, Polokwane, South Africa | Mauritania | 2–1 | 3–2 | 2014 African Nations Championship |
| 6. | 26 March 2021 | Intwari Stadium, Bujumbura, Burundi | Central African Republic | 2–2 | 2–2 | 2021 Africa Cup of Nations qualification |
| 7. | 25 March 2025 | Meknes Honor Stadium, Meknes, Morocco | Seychelles | 1–0 | 5–0 | 2026 FIFA World Cup qualification |

== Honours ==
Borneo Samarinda

- Piala Presiden runner-up: 2024
