= Khamis Mcha Khamis =

Tanzanian footballer

Personal information
- Full name: Khamis Mcha Khamis
- Date of birth: 1 October 1989 (age 37)
- Place of birth: Zanzibar City, Zanzibar, Tanzania
- Position: Midfielder

Team information
- Current team: Azam F.C.

Senior career*
| Years | Team | Apps | (Gls) |
| 2010 | Miembeni S.C. | | |
| 2011 | Zanzibar Ocean View | | |
| 2011– | Azam F.C. | | |

International career^{‡}
| 2010– | Tanzania | 15 | (4) |
| 2012– | Zanzibar | 18 | (5) |
- * Club domestic league appearances and goals as of 3 December 2012 ‡ National team caps and goals as of 10 October 2016

Khamis Mcha Khamis (born 1 October 1989) is a Tanzanian footballer from Zanzibar who plays as a midfielder for Azam FC.

== International career ==
=== International goals for Tanzania ===
Scores and results list Tanzania's goal tally first, score column indicates score after each Khamis goal.

List of international goals scored by Khamis Mcha Khamis
| No. | Date | Venue | Opponent | Score | Result | Competition | Ref. |
|---|---|---|---|---|---|---|---|
| 1 | 5 March 2014 | Sam Nujoma Stadium, Windhoek, Namibia | Namibia | 1–0 | 1–1 | Friendly | |
| 2 | 1 July 2014 | Botswana National Stadium, Gaborone, Botswana | Botswana | 1–0 | 2–4 | Friendly | |
| 3 | 20 July 2014 | National Stadium, Dar es Salaam, Tanzania | Mozambique | 1–1 | 2–2 | 2015 Africa Cup of Nations qualification | |
| 4 | 20 July 2014 | National Stadium, Dar es Salaam, Tanzania | Mozambique | 2–1 | 2–2 | 2015 Africa Cup of Nations qualification | |

=== International goals for Zanzibar ===
Scores and results list Zanzibar's goal tally first, score column indicates score after each Khamis goal.

List of international goals scored by Khamis Mcha Khamis
| No. | Date | Venue | Opponent | Score | Result | Competition | Ref. |
|---|---|---|---|---|---|---|---|
| 1 | 8 December 2010 | National Stadium, Dar es Salaam, Tanzania | Uganda | 1–1 | 2–2 | 2010 CECAFA Cup | |
| 2 | 29 November 2012 | Mandela National Stadium, Kampala, Uganda | Rwanda | 1–0 | 2–1 | 2012 CECAFA Cup | |
| 3 | 29 November 2012 | Mandela National Stadium, Kampala, Uganda | Rwanda | 2–0 | 2–1 | 2012 CECAFA Cup | |
| 4 | 6 December 2012 | Mandela National Stadium, Kampala, Uganda | Kenya | 1–0 | 2–2 | 2012 CECAFA Cup | |
| 5 | 27 November 2015 | Awassa Kenema Stadium, Awasa, Ethiopia | Kenya | 2–0 | 3–1 | 2015 CECAFA Cup | |

== See also ==
- List of top international men's football goalscorers by country
