= Selemani Ndikumana =

Burundian footballer (born 1987)

Personal information
- Full name: Selemani Yamin Ndikumana
- Date of birth: 18 March 1987 (age 39) (Note: As per Ndikumana's profile at Molde and Lierse. Other sources list his DoB as; 16 November 1986, 26 October 1988, 20 October 1988.)
- Place of birth: Bujumbura, Burundi
- Height: 1.86 m (6 ft 1 in)
- Position: Forward

Team information
- Current team: KMC

Youth career
- 2003–2006: AS Inter Star

Senior career*
Years	Team	Apps	(Gls)
2006–2007	Simba	36	(19)
2008	Molde	1	(0)
2009–2010	Lierse	13	(1)
2010–2011	Fantastique		
2011–2012	APR FC		
2012	Shenzhen Ruby		
2013	Al-Merrikh		
2013	Vital'O FC		
2014–2015	KF Tirana	42	(12)
2015	1º de Agosto		
2015–2016	Vital'O FC		
2016–2018	Al-Mesaimeer		
2019	Al-Adalah		
2019	Azam		
2020–	KMC		

International career^{‡}
2003–2019	Burundi	33	(12)
- * Club domestic league appearances and goals as of 7 April 2014 ‡ National team caps and goals as of 20 February 2018

Selemani Yamin Ndikumana (born 18 March 1987) is a Burundian professional footballer who plays as a forward for KMC in Tanzania.

== Club career ==
Ndikumana began his career with AS Inter Star and in 2006 joined Tanzanian Premier League club Simba SC. He moved in January 2008 to Norwegian side Molde FK. On 8 December 2008, he signed a one-and-a-half-year contract with Lierse S.K. in the Belgian Second Division. In the summer of 2010, he moved back to Burundi to play for Fantastique Bujumbura.

In January 2013, he joined Sudanese club Al-Merrikh SC.

On 31 January 2014, he joined Albanian club KF Tirana. He made his debut for Tirana on 7 February in a 1–0 win against rivals KF Partizani. Nine days later, he scored his first goal in Albania in another 1–0 win against Bylis Ballsh. On 2 March 2014, he scored his second goal for Tirana in a 1–1 against KF Flamurtari Vlora in Stadiumi Flamurtari.

In June 2015, he joined Angolan club C.D. Primeiro de Agosto. He was released, along with five other players, from the club at the end of the season.

On 29 January 2016, he, along with Fuadi Ndayisenga, signed for Burundian club Vital'O F.C.

On 27 July 2016, he joined Qatari club Al-Mesaimeer S.C.

== International career ==
Ndikumana is the captain of the Burundi national team.

== Career statistics ==
Scores and results list Burundi's goal tally first.

No	Date	Venue	Opponent	Score	Result	Competition
1.	2 February 2006	Cairo International Stadium, Cairo, Egypt	Egypt	1–4	1–4	2008 Africa Cup of Nations qualification
2.	26 November 2006	Addis Ababa Stadium, Addis Ababa, Ethiopia	Zambia	3–0	3–2	2006 CECAFA Cup
3.	10 December 2007	National Stadium, Dar es Salaam, Tanzania	Somalia	2–0	3–0	2007 CECAFA Cup
4.	10 December 2007	National Stadium, Dar es Salaam, Tanzania	Somalia	3–0	3–0	2007 CECAFA Cup
5.	1 June 2008	Prince Louis Rwagasore Stadium, Bujumbura, Burundi	Seychelles	1–0	1–0	2010 FIFA World Cup qualification
6.	5 June 2011	Prince Louis Rwagasore Stadium, Bujumbura, Burundi	Rwanda	1–0	3–1	2012 Africa Cup of Nations qualification
7.	15 November 2011	Prince Louis Rwagasore Stadium, Bujumbura, Burundi	Lesotho	2–2	2–2	2014 FIFA World Cup qualification
8.	25 November 2012	Mandela National Stadium, Kampala, Uganda	Somalia	3–1	5–1	2012 CECAFA Cup
9.	25 November 2012	Mandela National Stadium, Kampala, Uganda	Somalia	5–1	5–1	2012 CECAFA Cup
10.	28 November 2012	Mandela National Stadium, Kampala, Uganda	Tanzania	1–0	1–0	2012 CECAFA Cup
11.	18 January 2014	Peter Mokaba Stadium, Polokwane, South Africa	Mauritania	3–2	3–2	2014 African Nations Championship
12.	22 January 2014	Peter Mokaba Stadium, Polokwane, South Africa	DR Congo	1–0	1–2	2014 African Nations Championship
