= Jabril Hassan Mohammed =

Somalian footballer

Personal information
- Full name: Jabril Hassan Mohammed
- Date of birth: 1994 (age 31–32)
- Height: 1.93 m (6 ft 4 in)
- Position: Striker

Team information
- Current team: Heegan FC

Youth career
- 2001–????: Banaadir SC

Senior career*
Years	Team	Apps	(Gls)
????–????	Banaadir SC		
2012–2014	Heegan FC		
2014	Dong Thap		
2014–	Heegan FC		

International career^{‡}
2010–	Somalia	7	(1)
- * Club domestic league appearances and goals as of 30 October 2015 ‡ National team caps and goals as of 22 October 2014

Jabril Hassan Mohammed is a Somali international footballer who currently plays as a striker for Dong Thap and the Somalia national team.

== International career ==
He has made at least three senior appearances for Somalia national football team including some appearances in the 2013 CECAFA cup.
