= Ndaziona Chatsalira =

Malawian footballer

Personal information
- Date of birth: 8 November 1992 (age 33)
- Place of birth: Dowa, Malawi
- Height: 1.70 m (5 ft 7 in)
- Position: Midfielder

Team information
- Current team: ENH de Vilankulo

Senior career*
Years	Team	Apps	(Gls)
2010–2012	ESCOM United		
2012–2015	Silver Strikers		
2016–2019	Ferroviário de Nampula		
2016–2019	Ferroviário de Nacala	44	(6)
2020–	ENH de Vilankulo		

International career^{‡}
2015–	Malawi	24	(1)
- * Club domestic league appearances and goals as of 7 August 2021 ‡ National team caps and goals as of 7 August 2021

Ndaziona Chatsalira (born 8 November 1992) is a Malawian football midfielder who currently plays for ENH de Vilankulo.
