= Mike Baraza =

Kenyan footballer (born 1979)

Personal information
- Full name: Michael Baraza Nyongesa
- Date of birth: 17 March 1979 (age 47)
- Position: Striker

Senior career*
Years	Team	Apps	(Gls)
2001	A.F.C. Leopards		
2002	Nzoia Sugar		
2003–2006	Ulinzi Stars		
2006–2007	PDRM FA		
2007–2008	Simba		
2008–2010	Azam		
2011	Ulinzi Stars		
2011–2013	A.F.C. Leopards		
2015–	Western Stima		

International career^{‡}
2004–2013	Kenya	19	(5)
- * Club domestic league appearances and goals as of 11 May 2014 ‡ National team caps and goals as of 6 January 2013

Michael Baraza Nyongesa (born 17 March 1979) is a Kenyan footballer who currently plays for Kenyan Premier League club Western Stima as a striker.

== Career ==
=== Club career ===
Baraza began his club football career with A.F.C. Leopards in 2001, before moving to Nzoia Sugar the following year and then Ulinzi Stars in 2003. In 2006, he moved to Malaysia to play for PDRM FA and travelled to Tanzania the following year to play for Simba. He moved to Azam in 2008 and then rejoined Ulinzi Stars in 2010. He then joined A.F.C. Leopards in July 2011, where he was named the club's Player of the Year in 2012 after leading his club with nine goals during the 2012 Kenyan Premier League season. He retired at the end of the 2013 season. However, on 21 June 2015, it was announced that Baraza made a return to professional football, signing a six-month contract with Western Stima.

=== International career ===
Baraza made several appearances for the Kenya national football team and participated in 2012 Africa Cup of Nations qualification. He was also a part of the squad that finished second in the 2012 CECAFA Cup, playing the full 90 minutes as his nation fell to a 2–1 to hosts Uganda in the final.

== Personal life ==
Baraza's father, Sammy Nyongesa, is a former Kenya international footballer and manager.
