= Abdalla Juma =

Kenyan football manager

Personal information
- Full name: Abdalla Juma
- Height: 1.72 m (5 ft 8 in)

Managerial career
- Years: Team
- 2023-: Muranga SEAL (Head Coach)

Abdalla Juma is the current head coach at Kenyan Premier League side Muranga SEAL.

The veteran coach has previously coached at Thika United, KCB, Chemelil Sugar, FC Talanta, AFC Leopards as an assistant coach, and Western Stima, among others.
