= Emmanuel Okwi =

Ugandan footballer (born 1992)

Personal information
- Full name: Emmanuel Arnold Okwi
- Date of birth: 25 December 1992 (age 33)
- Place of birth: Kampala, Uganda
- Height: 1.76 m (5 ft 9 in)
- Position: Left winger

Team information
- Current team: Kiyovu Sports

Senior career*
Years	Team	Apps	(Gls)
2008–2009	SC Villa	40	(13)
2009–2013	Simba	38	(18)
2013	Étoile du Sahel	1	(0)
2013	SC Villa		
2013–2014	Young Africans	18	(9)
2014–2015	Simba	20	(16)
2015–2017	SønderjyskE	4	(0)
2017	SC Villa	13	(10)
2017–2019	Simba	53	(36)
2019–2021	Al Ittihad	32	(5)
2021–2022	Kiyovu Sports		
2022–2023	Al-Zawra'a		
2023–2024	Erbil SC		
2024–	Kiyovu Sports		

International career^{‡}
2009–2023	Uganda	95	(28)
- * Club domestic league appearances and goals as of 19:12, 31 July 2023 (UTC) ‡ National team caps and goals as of 23:20, 18 June 2023 (UTC)

Emmanuel Arnold Okwi (born 25 December 1992) is a Ugandan professional footballer who plays as a left winger for Rwanda Premier League club Kiyovu Sports.

== Club career ==
Okwi played for Uganda Super League club SC Villa before joining Tanzanian team Simba S.C. for US$40,000.

In January 2013, Tunisian team Étoile Sportive du Sahel signed Okwi for a Tanzania record transfer fee of US$300,000. The team, however, failed to pay the fee to Simba S.C. He was then cleared by FIFA's Player Status Committee in December 2013 to return to SC Villa although the clearance was changed two months later so he could play for Young Africans S.C., despite Simba S.C.'s protests.

Okwi rejoined Simba S.C. in August 2014 under a six-month contract, explaining that Young Africans S.C. had terminated his contract by failing to pay the US$50,000 owed to him. Okwi refused to play the last five games of the 2013–14 season for Young Africans because of the payment controversy. Young Africans vigorously protested the transfer to Simba S.C. and claimed that the contract was still in effect. The Tanzania Football Federation rejected that claim in September 2014.

In July 2015, SønderjyskE Fodbold signed Okwi on a five-year contract, with the consent of Simba S.C., that would last until 2020. In January 2017, Okwi agreed to terminate the contract. He scored two goals in six appearances.

Upon his return from Denmark Okwi re-joined former club SC Villa signing a six-month contract. He scored 10 goals in 13 Uganda Premier League matches.

In June 2017, Okwi signed with Simba S.C. for the third time in his career having agreed a two-year contract.

In July 2019, after impressing at the 2019 Africa Cup of Nations, Okwi joined Egyptian Premier League club Al Ittihad on a two-year contract.

In August 2024, he re-joined former club Kiyovu Sports on a one-year contract.

== International career ==
Okwi first represented Uganda at senior level in 2009. He was the second top scorer at the 2010 CECAFA Cup, scoring a four goals in five matches. The following year at the 2011 CECAFA Cup, he scored five goals and was joint top scorer alongside Rwanda's Meddie Kagere and their captain Olivier Karekezi..He officially announced his international football retirement on 18 March 2025

== Personal life ==
Okwi grew up idolizing Thierry Henry and is a fan of Arsenal F.C. Okwi was born into a Roman Catholic family, but at a young age, his mother became a Born Again Christian and raised her children in her faith. Okwi married his longtime girlfriend Florence Nakalegga with whom they have one child. Okwi played football as a boy while at St. Henry's College Kitovu.

== Career statistics ==
Okwi with Uganda

=== International ===
As of match played 18 June 2023

Appearances and goals by national team and year
National team	Year	Apps	Goals
Uganda	2009	7	1
Uganda	2010	6	4
Uganda	2011	6	5
Uganda	2012	12	3
Uganda	2013	10	5
Uganda	2014	5	0
Uganda	2015	0	0
Uganda	2016	6	0
Uganda	2017	8	1
Uganda	2018	8	2
Uganda	2019	11	5
Uganda	2020	2	0
Uganda	2021	6	0
Uganda	2022	4	2
Uganda	2023	4	0
Total		95	28

Scores and results list Uganda's goal tally first, score column indicates score after each Okwi goal.

List of international goals scored by Emmanuel Okwi
No.	Date	Venue	Opponent	Score	Result	Competition
1	13 December 2009	Nyayo National Stadium, Nairobi, Kenya	Rwanda	2–0	2–0	2009 CECAFA Cup
2	2 December 2010	Benjamin Mkapa National Stadium, Dar es Salaam, Tanzania	Malawi	1–1	1–1	2010 CECAFA Cup
3	5 December 2010	Benjamin Mkapa National Stadium, Dar es Salaam, Tanzania	Kenya	1–0	2–1	2010 CECAFA Cup
4	8 December 2010	Benjamin Mkapa National Stadium, Dar es Salaam, Tanzania	Zanzibar	2–1	2–2	2010 CECAFA Cup
5	12 December 2010	Benjamin Mkapa National Stadium, Dar es Salaam, Tanzania	Ethiopia	2–2	4–3	2010 CECAFA Cup
6	28 November 2011	Chamazi Stadium, Dar es Salaam, Tanzania	Somalia	2–0	4–0	2011 CECAFA Cup
7	28 November 2011	Chamazi Stadium, Dar es Salaam, Tanzania	Somalia	3–0	4–0	2011 CECAFA Cup
8	28 November 2011	Chamazi Stadium, Dar es Salaam, Tanzania	Somalia	4–0	4–0	2011 CECAFA Cup
9	8 December 2011	Benjamin Mkapa National Stadium, Dar es Salaam, Tanzania	Tanzania	2–1	3–1	2011 CECAFA Cup
10	10 December 2011	Benjamin Mkapa National Stadium, Dar es Salaam, Tanzania	Rwanda	2–2	2–2	2011 CECAFA Cup
11	3 June 2012	Estádio 11 de Novembro, Luanda, Angola	Angola	1–1	1–1	2014 FIFA World Cup qualification
12	16 June 2012	Mandela National Stadium, Kampala, Uganda	Congo	4–0	4–0	2013 Africa Cup of Nations qualification
13	6 December 2012	Mandela National Stadium, Kampala, Uganda	Tanzania	1–0	3–0	2012 CECAFA Cup
14	15 June 2013	Mandela National Stadium, Kampala, Uganda	Angola	1–1	2–1	2014 FIFA World Cup qualification
15	31 August 2013	Botswana National Stadium, Gaborone, Botswana	Botswana	1–0	3–1	Friendly
16	31 August 2013	Botswana National Stadium, Gaborone, Botswana	Botswana	2–0	3–1	Friendly
17	2 December 2013	Nairobi City Stadium, Nairobi, Kenya	Eritrea	1–0	3–0	2013 CECAFA Cup
18	2 December 2013	Nairobi City Stadium, Nairobi, Kenya	Eritrea	3–0	3–0	2013 CECAFA Cup
19	31 August 2017	Mandela National Stadium, Kampala, Uganda	Egypt	1–0	1–0	2018 FIFA World Cup qualification
20	13 October 2018	Mandela National Stadium, Kampala, Uganda	Lesotho	1–0	3–0	2019 Africa Cup of Nations qualification
21	13 October 2018	Mandela National Stadium, Kampala, Uganda	Lesotho	3–0	3–0	2019 Africa Cup of Nations qualification
22	22 June 2019	Cairo International Stadium, Cairo, Egypt	DR Congo	2–0	2–0	2019 Africa Cup of Nations
23	26 June 2019	Cairo International Stadium, Cairo, Egypt	Zimbabwe	1–0	1–1	2019 Africa Cup of Nations
24	8 September 2019	Moi International Sports Centre, Nairobi, Kenya	Kenya	1–0	1–1	Friendly
25	13 October 2019	Bahir Dar Stadium, Bahir Dar, Ethiopia	Ethiopia	1–0	1–0	Friendly
26	17 November 2019	Mandela National Stadium, Kampala, Uganda	Malawi	1–0	2–0	2021 Africa Cup of Nations qualification
27	25 March 2022	Markaziy Stadium, Namangan, Uzbekistan	Tajikistan	1–0	1–1	2022 Nowruz Cup
28	29 March 2022	Markaziy Stadium, Namangan, Uzbekistan	Uzbekistan	2–4	2–4	2022 Nowruz Cup
