= Jean-Baptiste Mugiraneza =

Rwandan footballer (born 1991)

Migi
Personal information
- Full name: Jean-Baptiste Mugiraneza
- Date of birth: 17 February 1991 (age 35)
- Place of birth: Nyamirambo, Nyarugenge District, Rwanda
- Height: 1.88 m (6 ft 2 in)
- Position: Midfielder

Youth career
- 2003–2005: Kiyovu Sport

Senior career*
Years	Team	Apps	(Gls)
2006	Kiyovu Sport	20	(0)
2007–2015	APR	102	(32)
2015–2016	Azam		
2016	Kiyovu Sport	14	(2)
2016–2018	Gor Mahia		
2018–2019	APR		
2019–2022	2023 KMC		

International career
2006–2018	Rwanda	68	(7)
- * Club domestic league appearances and goals as of 15:23, 26 December 2022 (UTC)

Jean-Baptiste Mugiraneza (born 17 February 1991 in Kigali) is a Rwandan football coach and former footballer.

== Career ==
Migi began his career for SC Kiyovu Sport and signed 2007 for league rival APR FC. On 9 February 2009 was linked with a move to famous French club Stade Rennais F.C., after 7 years as APR FC player Mugiraneza jean Baptiste. On 14 July 2015 migi signed for two years with Tanzanian giant Azam F.C. In December 2016, Migi quits Azam FC and joins Gor Mahia for two years.

== International career ==
Mugiraneza is a regular starter on the Rwanda national football team.

=== International goals ===
Scores and results list Rwanda's goal tally first.

Goal	Date	Venue	Opponent	Score	Result	Competition
1.	2 December 2011	National Stadium, Dar es Salaam, Tanzania	Djibouti	2–2	5–2	2011 CECAFA Cup
2.	5 December 2011	National Stadium, Dar es Salaam, Tanzania	Zanzibar	1–0	2–1	2011 CECAFA Cup
3.	26 November 2012	Mandela National Stadium, Kampala, Uganda	Malawi	1–0	2–0	2012 CECAFA Cup
4.	28 August 2015	Amahoro Stadium, Kigali, Rwanda	Ethiopia	3–1	3–1	Friendly
5.	3 December 2015	Addis Ababa Stadium, Addis Ababa, Ethiopia	Sudan	1–1	1–1	2015 CECAFA Cup
6.	29 March 2016	Amahoro Stadium, Kigali, Rwanda	Mauritius	5–0	5–0	2017 Africa Cup of Nations qualification
