= Hermon Tekleab =

Eritrean footballer

Personal information
- Full name: Hermon Tekleab Fessehaye
- Date of birth: 3 December 1993 (age 32)
- Place of birth: Asmara, Eritrea
- Height: 1.81 m (5 ft 11 1/2 in)
- Position: Central midfielder

Team information
- Current team: SteDoCo
- Number: 17

Senior career*
Years	Team	Apps	(Gls)
–2015	Red Sea FC		
2015–2019	Kozakken Boys	38	(5)
2019–2021	IFC	23	(4)
2021–2022	Smitshoek	13	(3)
2022–	SteDoCo	3	(0)

International career
2009–2012	Eritrea	5	(1)
- * Club domestic league appearances and goals as of 09:35, 3 March 2023 (UTC)

Hermon Tekleab (born 3 December 1993) is an Eritrean footballer who plays as a central midfielder for Derde Divisie club SteDoCo. He formerly played for the Eritrea national football team.

== Club career ==
After playing for Red Sea FC and Kozakken Boys, he joined Ido's Football Club in 2019.

== International career ==
Tekleab played in the 2009 CECAFA Cup in Kenya, appearing as a substitute in the 4–0 quarter-final defeat to Tanzania.
