= Haruna Niyonzima =

Rwandan footballer (born 1990)

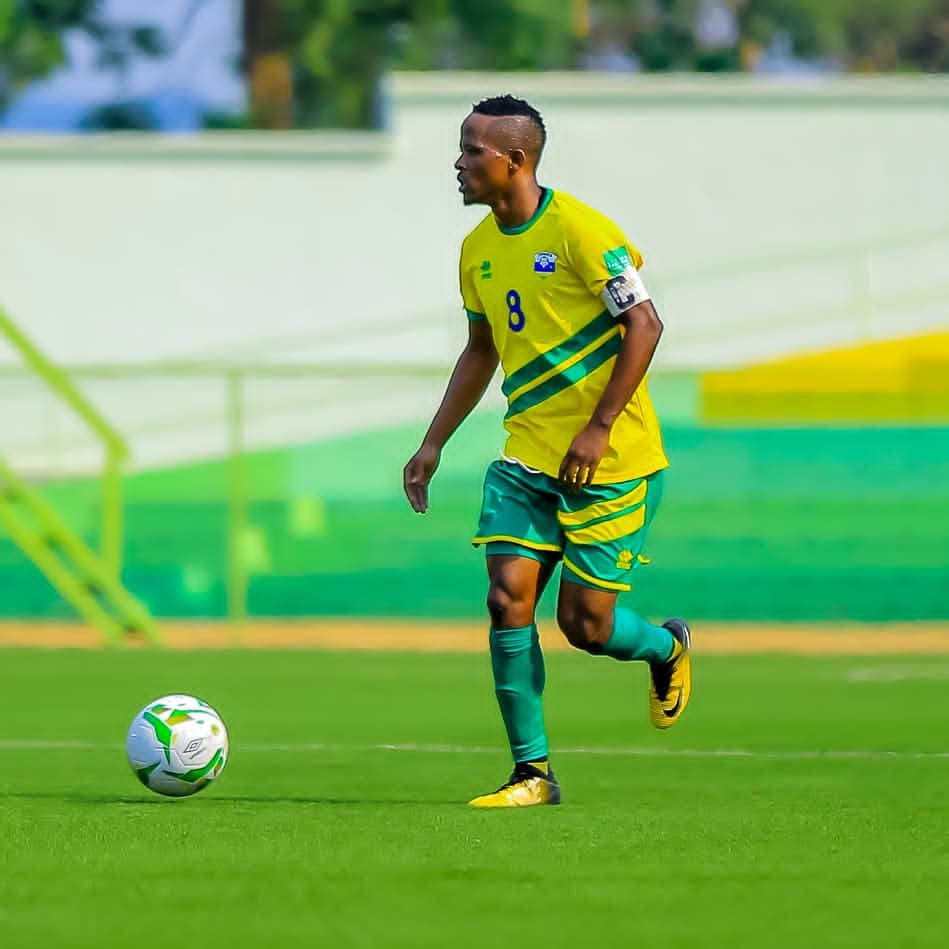

Personal information
- Full name: Haruna Fadhili Niyonzima
- Date of birth: 5 February 1990 (age 36)
- Place of birth: Gisenyi, Rwanda
- Height: 1.67 m (5 ft 6 in)
- Position: Midfielder

Team information
- Current team: Al Ta'awon

Senior career*
| Years | Team | Apps | (Gls) |
| 2005 | Etincelles | | |
| 2006–2007 | Rayon Sports | | |
| 2007–2011 | APR | | |
| 2011–2017 | Young Africans | | |
| 2017–2019 | Simba | | |
| 2019 | AS Kigali | | |
| 2020–2021 | Young Africans | | |
| 2021–2022 | AS Kigali | | |
| 2022– | Al Ta'awon | | |

International career^{‡}
| 2006– | Rwanda | 110 | (6) |
- * Club domestic league appearances and goals as of 11:54, 18 October 2019 (UTC) ‡ National team caps and goals as of 9 September 2022 (UTC)

Haruna Fadhili Niyonzima (born 5 February 1990) is a Rwandan professional footballer who plays as a midfielder for Libyan Premier League club Al Ta'awon and captains the Rwanda national team.

== Club career ==
Born in Gisenyi, Niyonzima has played club football in Rwanda and Tanzania for Etincelles, Rayon Sports, APR, Young Africans, Simba and A.S. Kigali.

Niyonzima left A.S. Kigali at the end of 2019 to return to former club Young Africans.

== International career ==
Niyonzima made his senior international debut for Rwanda in 2006, and has appeared in FIFA World Cup qualifying matches.

== Career statistics ==
Scores and results list Rwanda's goal tally first, score column indicates score after each Niyonzima goal.

List of international goals scored by Haruna Niyonzima
| No. | Date | Venue | Opponent | Score | Result | Competition |
|---|---|---|---|---|---|---|
| 1 | 2 June 2007 | Amahoro Stadium, Kigali, Rwanda | Equatorial Guinea | 1–0 | 2–0 | 2008 Africa Cup of Nations qualification |
| 2 | 2 June 2007 | Amahoro Stadium, Kigali, Rwanda | Equatorial Guinea | 2–0 | 2–0 | 2008 Africa Cup of Nations qualification |
| 3 | 9 December 2007 | National Stadium, Dar es Salaam, Tanzania | Eritrea | 1–0 | 2–1 | 2007 CECAFA Cup |
| 4 | 22 December 2007 | National Stadium, Dar es Salaam, Tanzania | Sudan | 1–2 | 2–2 | 2007 CECAFA Cup |
| 5 | 8 December 2009 | Nyayo National Stadium, Nairobi, Kenya | Zimbabwe | 4–1 | 4–1 | 2009 CECAFA Cup |
| 6 | 26 November 2012 | Mandela National Stadium, Kampala, Uganda | Malawi | 2–0 | 2–0 | 2012 CECAFA Cup |

== See also ==
- List of men's footballers with 100 or more international caps
