= Brian Umony =

Ugandan footballer (born 1988)

Personal information
- Full name: Brian Umony
- Date of birth: 12 December 1988 (age 37)
- Place of birth: Jinja, Uganda
- Height: 1.70 m (5 ft 7 in)
- Position: Forward

Team information
- Current team: Kampala City Council

Senior career*
Years	Team	Apps	(Gls)
2003–2004	Nakawa United		
2004–2007	Naguru Avis		
2007–2009	Kampala City Council FC		(34)
2009–2010	Supersport United	12	(2)
2010–2011	University of Pretoria		
2011	→ Portland Timbers (loan)	6	(0)
2012	Becamex Binh Duong	12	(1)
2013	Azam		
2014–2017	Kampala City Council		
2018	Gokulam Kerala	2	(0)

International career^{‡}
2009–	Uganda	36	(12)
- * Club domestic league appearances and goals as of 27 October 2011 ‡ National team caps and goals as of 31 March 2017

Brian Umony (born 12 December 1988 in Jinja, Uganda) is a former Ugandan footballer who last played for Kampala City Council FC. Since 2009, he is a regular member of the Uganda national football team.

== Early life ==
Born on 12 December 1988 in Jinja to Francis Kermit and Loise Uwanchango, Umony is the youngest of four children. After the death of his mother in 1997, he moved to Kampala to live with his maternal uncle. He started playing football at a young age but struggled to get onto the school teams as he was constantly overlooked because of his small stature.

== Club career ==
=== 2007-08 ===
Umony signed with Kampala City Council FC (KCC) in 2007 after failing to achieve promotion with First Division side Naguru Avis. Coming on as a second-half substitute, he scored the winning goal on his league debut for KCC against Iganga TC. In his first season in the top-flight, Umony finished the league as joint top scorer with 15 goals to help KCC claim their first league title in 11 years. He also received the Footballer of the Year award for his goalscoring antics.

=== 2008-09 ===
In his second season with KCC, scored 19 goals in the Uganda Super League, three behind Police FC's Peter Ssenyonjo who won the league's goalscoring crown. Umony was also instrumental in his club in reaching the second round of the 2009 CAF Champions League scoring four goals, including strikes that helped eliminate Ferroviário Maputo and Supersport United. He also had a 16-match goal scoring run for club and country.

=== 2009-12 ===
After undergoing a week-long trial, Umony signed a two-year deal with South African Premier Soccer League club Supersport United in late June 2009. On 8 July 2010, he was released by SuperSport United.

On 31 August 2010, Umony moved to University of Pretoria F.C. on a permanent transfer. He signed a one-year deal with TUKS that will run in collaboration with the year that he had remaining on his SuperSport contract.

In February 2011, having trained with the club through its pre-season, Umony signed a one-year loan deal with the Portland Timbers for their debut year in Major League Soccer.

Following the 2011 season, the Timbers announced that they had declined the option to purchase Umony's rights and that he would not return for the 2012 season.

In January 2012, Umony signed with Vietnamese side Becamex Binh Duong.

In December 2012, Umony signed a two-year contract with Tanzanian club Azam F.C.

In April 2018, Umony moved to India and signed with I-League side Gokulam Kerala FC on a one-year deal.

In January 2019, Umony signed to play for Express FC. Umony is eyeing a place in Uganda Cranes' coach Sebastien Desabre's squad for the AFCON finals in mid 2019 where the Cranes will take part.

== International career ==
Umony made his debut for the Uganda national football team in 2009. He topscored at the 2008 CECAFA Cup with five goals that helped his country win a record 10th CECAFA Cup title.

=== International goals ===
Scores and results list Uganda's goal tally first.

No	Date	Venue	Opponent	Score	Result	Competition
1.	1 January 2009	Mandela National Stadium, Kampala, Uganda	Rwanda	3–0	4–0	2008 CECAFA Cup
2.	9 January 2009	Mandela National Stadium, Kampala, Uganda	Tanzania	1–0	2–1	2008 CECAFA Cup
3.	11 January 2009	Mandela National Stadium, Kampala, Uganda	Burundi	1–0	5–0	2008 CECAFA Cup
4.	11 January 2009	Mandela National Stadium, Kampala, Uganda	Burundi	5–0	5–0	2008 CECAFA Cup
5.	13 January 2009	Mandela National Stadium, Kampala, Uganda	Kenya	1–0	1–0	2008 CECAFA Cup
6.	7 March 2009	Al-Merrikh Stadium, Omdurman, Sudan	Sudan	1–0	2–0	Friendly
7.	7 March 2009	Al-Merrikh Stadium, Omdurman, Sudan	Sudan	2–0	2–0	Friendly
8.	21 March 2009	Mandela National Stadium, Kampala, Uganda	Malawi	1–1	2–1	Friendly
9.	27 November 2012	Mandela National Stadium, Kampala, Uganda	Ethiopia	1–0	1–0	2012 CECAFA Cup
10.	30 November 2012	Mandela National Stadium, Kampala, Uganda	South Sudan	1–0	4–0	2012 CECAFA Cup
11.	30 November 2012	Mandela National Stadium, Kampala, Uganda	South Sudan	2–0	4–0	2012 CECAFA Cup
12.	13 June 2015	Mandela National Stadium, Kampala, Uganda	Botswana	2–0	2–0	2017 Africa Cup of Nations qualification

== Personal life ==
Umony graduated from the Kyambogo University. He enjoys reading works of Shakespeare.

== Playing honours ==
=== Kampala City Council ===
- Ugandan Super League: 2007–08

=== National team ===
- CECAFA Cup: 2009

== Individual honours ==
- Ugandan Super League Golden Boot: 2007–08 (joint)
- Ugandan Footballer of the Year: 2008
- CECAFA Cup Golden Boot: 2009
