= Aggrey Morris =

Tanzanian footballer

Personal information
- Full name: Morris Aggrey Ambros
- Date of birth: 12 March 1984 (age 42)
- Place of birth: Zanzibar, Tanzania
- Height: 1.78 m (5 ft 10 in)
- Position: Defender

Team information
- Current team: Azam
- Number: 13

Youth career
- Mafunzo

Senior career*
Years	Team	Apps	(Gls)
2003–2009	Mafunzo		
2009–	Azam		

International career^{‡}
2009–2012	Zanzibar	15	(6)
2010–	Tanzania	35	(2)
- * Club domestic league appearances and goals ‡ National team caps and goals as of June 30, 2014

Aggrey Morris Ambros (born 12 March 1984) is a Tanzanian footballer from Zanzibar who plays for Azam in the Tanzanian Premier League and is member of the Tanzania national football team.

== Career ==
Morris started his career of the Island of Zanzibar with Mafunzo F.C., before joined in 2009 to Azzam United. In March 2012 was named as player of the year in the season 2011/2012.

=== International ===
Aggrey is a member of Tanzania national football team. He presented also fifteen times the Zanzibar national football team.

=== International goals for Zanzibar ===
Scores and results list Zanzibar's goal tally first.

Goal	Date	Venue	Opponent	Score	Result	Competition
1.	1 January 2009	Mandela National Stadium, Kampala, Uganda	Somalia	2–0	2–0	2008 CECAFA Cup
2.	1 January 2009	Mandela National Stadium, Kampala, Uganda	Somalia	2–0	2–0	2008 CECAFA Cup
3.	29 November 2009	Mumias Sports Complex, Mumias, Kenya	Burundi	1–0	4–0	Friendly
4.	8 December 2010	National Stadium, Dar es Salaam, Tanzania	Uganda	2–2	2–2 (3–5 p)	2010 CECAFA Cup
5.	1 December 2011	National Stadium, Dar es Salaam, Tanzania	Somalia	3–0	3–0	2011 CECAFA Cup
6.	6 December 2012	Mandela National Stadium, Kampala, Uganda	Kenya	2–1	2–2 (2–4 p)	2012 CECAFA Cup

=== International goals for Tanzania ===
Scores and results list Tanzania's goal tally first.

No.	Date	Venue	Opponent	Score	Result	Competition
1.	17 June 2012	Estádio do Zimpeto, Maputo, Mozambique	Mozambique	1–1	1–1 (6–7 p)	2013 Africa Cup of Nations qualification
2.	14 November 2012	CCM Kirumba Stadium, Mwanza, Tanzania	Kenya	1–0	1–0	Friendly
3.	23 March 2019	National Stadium, Dar es Salaam, Tanzania	Uganda	3–0	3–0	2019 Africa Cup of Nations qualification
