= David Ochieng =

Kenyan footballer (born 1992)

Personal information
- Date of birth: 7 October 1992 (age 34)
- Place of birth: Nairobi, Kenya
- Height: 1.89 m (6 ft 2 in)
- Position: Defender

Senior career*
| Years | Team | Apps | (Gls) |
| 2011 | Nairobi Stima | | |
| 2012–2013 | Tusker | | |
| 2013–2015 | Al-Taawon | 51 | (1) |
| 2016–2017 | New York Cosmos | 29 | (1) |
| 2018 | Brommapojkarna | 13 | (0) |
| 2019 | AFC Leopards | | |
| 2019–2020 | Al-Ansar | | |
| 2020– | Mathare United | | |

International career^{‡}
| 2012– | Kenya | 33 | (2) |
- * Club domestic league appearances and goals as of 16:20, 4 May 2023 (UTC) ‡ National team caps and goals as of 09:02, 24 January 2019 (UTC)

David Ochieng (born 7 October 1992) is a Kenyan professional footballer who plays as a defender for Kenyan Premier League club Mathare United and the Kenya national team.

== Club career ==
Born in Nairobi, Ochieng spent his early career with Nairobi Stima, Tusker and Al-Taawon.

He joined the New York Cosmos in February 2016, leaving the club ahead of the 2018 season.

He spent the 2018 season with Swedish club Brommapojkarna. On 11 March 2019, he joined AFC Leopards in Kenya on a short-term deal. In July 2019 he signed for Saudi club Al-Ansar.

== International career ==
He made his senior international debut for Kenya in 2012, and has appeared in FIFA World Cup qualifying matches.
