= Nadir Haroub =

Tanzanian footballer

Personal information
- Full name: Nadir Haroub Ali
- Date of birth: 10 February 1982 (age 44)
- Place of birth: Michenzani, Zanzibar, Tanzania
- Height: 5 ft 11 in (1.80 m)
- Position: Centre back

Team information
- Current team: Young Africans FC
- Number: 32

Youth career
- 1994–2000: Young Africans FC

Senior career*
Years	Team	Apps	(Gls)
2000–2003	Young Africans FC	2	(0)
2003–2005	Malindi FC	36	(0)
2006–2018	Young Africans FC	119	(7)
2009 - 2010	→ Whitecaps Residency (loan)	0	(0)

International career^{‡}
2006–2017	Tanzania	51	(3)
2008–2017	Zanzibar	21	(1)
- * Club domestic league appearances and goals as of May 5, 2011 ‡ National team caps and goals as of May 5, 2011

Nadir Haroub Ali (born 10 February 1982) is a Tanzanian former footballer who last played for Young Africans FC as a defender. He is one among club's long serving member as he played more than 200 games in his 16-year spell with Young Africans.

Haroub's nickname Cannavaro is in reference to the way he plays the game as a defender similar to Fabio Cannavaro.

Nadir Haroub was made Young Africans and Tanzania national team captain after the retirement of long serving captain Shadrack Nsajigwa in 2012. Also he captained Zanzibar national team in most Cecafa tournaments and friendly matches during his playing time. After his retirement, Haroub remained with Young Africans SC as first team coach during 2017 to 2019.

== Career ==
On 13 August 2009 left Young Africans FC of the Tanzanian Premier League who played from 2006 to 2009 on loan to Vancouver Whitecaps Residency, formerly played one season in the Zanzibar Premier League.

== International career ==
Haroub represented the Tanzania national football team in qualifying matches for the FIFA World Cup and the Africa Cup of Nations, and in friendly matches. He capped 13 times for Tanzania in three different editions of the FIFA World Cup qualifiers (2010, 2014 and 2018). Being Zanzibari, he played for the Zanzibar national football team in seven editions of the CECAFA Cup (from 2007 to 2012, and 2015).

=== International goals for Tanzania ===
Scores and results list Tanzania's goal tally first.

Goal	Date	Venue	Opponent	Score	Result	Competition
1.	3 March 2010	CCM Kirumba Stadium, Mwanza, Tanzania	Uganda	1–1	2–3	2008 Africa Cup of Nations qualification
2.	1 June 2014	National Sports Stadium, Harare, Zimbabwe	Zimbabwe	1–1	2–2	2015 Africa Cup of Nations qualification
3.	12 October 2014	National Stadium, Dar es Salaam, Tanzania	Benin	1–0	4–1	Friendly

=== International goals for Zanzibar ===
Scores and results list Zanzibar's goal tally first.

Goal	Date	Venue	Opponent	Score	Result	Competition
1.	5 January 2009	Nakivubo Stadium, Kampala, Uganda	Tanzania	1–1	1–2	2008 CECAFA Cup
