= Robert Ssentongo (footballer) =

Ugandan footballer (born 1988)

Personal information
- Date of birth: 5 June 1988 (age 38)
- Place of birth: Kampala, Uganda
- Height: 1.70 m (5 ft 7 in)
- Position: Striker

Team information
- Current team: Kyetume FC
- Number: 9

Senior career*
Years	Team	Apps	(Gls)
2004	Simba		
2005	SC Villa		
2006	Kampala City Council		
2006–2008	Brabrand		
2008–2009	Kampala City Council		
2009–2010	African Lyon		
2010–2012	URA		
2012–2014	Saint George		
2014–2016	URA		
2016–2017	Kampala City Council		
2017–2018	Fasil Kenema		
2018–	Kyetume FC		

International career^{‡}
2004–	Uganda	38	(8)
- * Club domestic league appearances and goals as of 14:25, 7 February 2018 (UTC) ‡ National team caps and goals as of 14:25, 7 February 2018 (UTC)

Robert Ssentongo (born 5 June 1988) is an Ugandan international footballer who plays for Kyetume FC, as a striker.

== Club career ==
Born in Kampala, Ssentongo has played club football for Simba, SC Villa, Kampala City Council, Brabrand, African Lyon, URA, Saint George, Fasil Kenema, and Kyetume FC.

He scored a hat trick in the FUFA Big League promotion playoffs final in 2019 to help Kyetume FC earn promotion to the top flight for the first time.

In 2018 he signed for Kyetume FC.

== International career ==
He made his senior international debut for Uganda in 2004, and has appeared in FIFA World Cup qualifying matches. He was the top scorer at the 2012 Cecafa-Tusker Challenge Cup. He was a squad member at the 2016 African Nations Championship.

== Honours ==
Individual

- Cecafa-Tusker Challenge Cup top scorer (1): 2012
- Uganda Premier League top scorer (4): 2004, 2011–12, 2014–15, 2015–16
- Uganda Premier League Team of the Season (1): 2015–16
