= Geoffrey Kizito =

Ugandan professional footballer (born 1993)

Personal information
- Full name: Geoffrey Baba Kizito
- Date of birth: 2 February 1993 (age 33)
- Place of birth: Kampala, Uganda
- Height: 1.73 m (5 ft 8 in)
- Position: Defensive midfielder

Team information
- Current team: Thai Nguyen
- Number: 39

Youth career
- Villa

Senior career*
Years	Team	Apps	(Gls)
–2012	Express		
2012–2013	Xuan Thanh Saigon	33	(5)
2014	Gor Mahia	28	(5)
2015–2018	Than Quang Ninh	66	(1)
2018–2019	Saigon	25	(3)
2020–2022	Than Quang Ninh	29	(2)
2022	Nam Dinh	23	(0)
2023–2026	Becamex Ho Chi Minh City	86	(0)
2026–	Thai Nguyen	7	(1)

International career
2012–2018	Uganda	41	(3)
- * Club domestic league appearances and goals as of 8 November 2026

Geoffrey Baba Kizito (born 2 February 1993), also known as Trần Trung Hiếu, is a Ugandan professional footballer who plays as a defensive midfielder for V.League 2 club Thai Nguyen.

== Club career ==
Born in Kampala, Kizito began his career at Uganda Premier League teams Villa and Express.

He moved to Vietnam in 2012, joining Xuan Thanh Saigon, where he spent two seasons. In early January 2014 he signed a deal to play for Kenyan Premier League champions Gor Mahia. He returned to Vietnam for the 2015 season, with Than Quang Ninh. In 2018, he joined Saigon. He moved to Than Quang Ninh for the 2020 season.

In January 2023, Kizito signed for Becamex Binh Duong.

In August 2026, Kizito moved to V.League 2 club Thai Nguyen.

== International career ==
He made his international debut for Uganda in 2012. He featured in Uganda's 23-men squad for the 2017 Africa Cup of Nations.

== Personal life ==
In 2017 he became a naturalised citizen of Vietnam, under the name Trần Trung Hiếu.
