= 2013 CECAFA Cup statistics =

Football tournament statistics

The following article contains statistics for the 2013 CECAFA Cup, which took place in Kenya from 27 November to 12 December 2013. Goals scored from penalty shoot-outs are not counted.

== Goalscorers ==
5 goals

- (Sudan) Salah Ibrahim

3 goals

- (Kenya) Jockins Atudo
- (Kenya) Allan Wanga
- (Zambia) Ronald Kampamba
- (Zambia) Festus Mbewe

2 goals

- (Tanzania) Mrisho Ngasa
- (Tanzania) Mbwana Samatta
- (Uganda) Emmanuel Okwi
- (Uganda) Dan Sserunkuma
- (Zambia) Bornwell Mwape

1 goal

- (Burundi) Fiston Abdul Razak
- (Burundi) Christophe Nduwarugira
- (Ethiopia) Fasika Asfaw
- (Ethiopia) Saladin Bargicho
- (Ethiopia) Biruk Kalbore
- (Ethiopia) Yonathan Kebede
- (Ethiopia) Yussuf Saleh
- (Kenya) Jacob Keli
- (Kenya) Clifton Miheso
- (Kenya) David Owino
- (Rwanda) Michel Ndahinduka
- (South Sudan) Richard Justin Lado
- (South Sudan) Fabiano Lako
- (Sudan) Moaaz Abdelraheem
- (Sudan) Muhannad El Tahir
- (Tanzania) Haruna Chanongo
- (Tanzania) Said Morad
- (Uganda) Khalid Aucho
- (Uganda) Hamis Kiiza
- (Uganda) Martin Kayongo-Mutumba
- (Zanzibar) Awadh Juma Issa
- (Zanzibar) Abdi Kassim
- (Zanzibar) Adeyum Saleh

1 own goal

- (Ethiopia) Saladin Bargicho (playing against Sudan)

== Scoring ==
- Total number of goals scored: 51
- Average goals per match: 1.96
- Total number of braces: 6 – Salah Ibrahim, Festus Mbewe, Bornwell Mwape, Mrisho Ngassa, Emmanuel Okwi, Allan Wanga
- Total number of penalty kicks awarded: 6
- Total number of penalty kicks scored: 5
- Penalty kick success rate: 83.33%
- Most goals scored by a team: 9 – Kenya
- Most goals scored by an individual: 5 – Salah Ibrahim
- Fewest goals scored by a team: 0 – Eritrea, Somalia
- Most goals conceded by a team: 7 – Eritrea, Somalia, South Sudan
- Fewest goals conceded by a team: 1 – Kenya
- Best goal difference: +8 – Kenya
- Worst goal difference: –7 – Eritrea, Somalia
- Most goals scored in a match by both teams: 4 – Ethiopia (3–1) Zanzibar, South Sudan (1–3) Kenya, Somalia (0–4) Zambia, Uganda (2–2) Tanzania
- Most goals scored in a match by one team: 4 – Zambia against Somalia
- Most goals scored in a match by the losing team: 2 – Uganda against Tanzania
- Biggest margin of victory: 4 goals – Somalia (0–4) Zambia
- Most clean sheets achieved by a team: 5 – Kenya
- Fewest clean sheets achieved by a team: 0 – Eritrea, Somalia, South Sudan
- Most clean sheets given by an opposing team: 3 – Burundi, Eritrea, Rwanda, Somalia
- Fewest clean sheets given by an opposing team: 0 – Tanzania, Uganda
- Most consecutive clean sheets achieved by a team: 4 – Kenya
- Most consecutive clean sheets given by an opposing team: 3 – Burundi, Eritrea, Somalia
- First goal of the tournament: Abdi Kassim for Zanzibar against South Sudan
- First brace of the tournament: Salah Ibrahim for Sudan against Eritrea
- Fastest goal in a match from kickoff: 2nd minute – Bornwell Mwape for Zambia against Somalia
- Latest goal in a match without extra time: 89th minute – Dan Sserunkuma for Uganda against Rwanda
- Latest winning goal in a match without extra time: 89th minute – Dan Sserunkuma for Uganda against Rwanda
- Latest winning goal in a match with extra time: 120th minute – Salah Ibrahim for Sudan against Zambia
- Most goals scored by one player in a match: 2 – Salah Ibrahim for Sudan against Eritrea, Emmanuel Okwi for Uganda against Eritrea, Bornwell Mwape for Zambia against Somalia, Festus Mbewe for Zambia against Somalia, Mrisho Ngassa for Tanzania against Uganda, Allan Wanga for Kenya against Sudan
- Own goals scored: 1 – Saladin Bargicho (Ethiopia)

== Wins and losses ==
- Most wins: 5 – Kenya
- Fewest wins: 0 – Eritrea, Somalia, South Sudan
- Most losses: 3 – Eritrea, Rwanda, Somalia, South Sudan
- Fewest losses: 0 – Kenya, Uganda
- Most draws: 3 – Tanzania, Zambia
- Fewest draws: 0 – Eritrea, Rwanda, Somalia, South Sudan, Sudan, Zanzibar
- Most points in the group stage: 9 – Uganda
- Fewest points in the group stage: 0 – Eritrea, Somalia, South Sudan

== Disciplinary record ==
- Total number of yellow cards: 38
- Average yellow cards per match: 1.46
- Total number of red cards: 1
- Average red cards per match: 0.04
- First yellow card of the tournament: David Owino for Kenya against Ethiopia
- First red card of the tournament: Salum Abubakar for Tanzania against Uganda
- Fastest yellow card from kick off: 3rd minute – Ronald Kampamba for Zambia against Burundi
- Latest yellow card in a match without extra time: 90+4th minute – Paul Kiongera for Kenya against Sudan
- Fastest dismissal from kick off: 52nd minute – Salum Abubakar for Tanzania against Uganda
- Latest dismissal in a match without extra time: 52nd minute – Salum Abubakar for Tanzania against Uganda
- Most yellow cards (team): 12 – Kenya
- Most red cards (team): 1 – Tanzania
- Fewest yellow cards (team): 0 – Burundi
- Most yellow cards (player): 3 – Aboud Omar
- Most red cards (player): 1 – Salum Abubakar
- Most yellow cards (match): 4 – Ethiopia vs Sudan, Kenya vs Sudan
- Most red cards (match): 1 – Uganda vs Tanzania
- Fewest yellow cards (match): 0 – Burundi vs Somalia, Ethiopia vs Zanzibar, South Sudan vs Ethiopia, Tanzania vs Zambia, Uganda vs Sudan, Uganda vs Tanzania, Zanzibar vs South Sudan
- Most cards in one match: 4 cards; 4 yellow cards – Ethiopia vs Sudan, Kenya vs Sudan

=== By team ===
Team	Yellow	Red	Red Cards	Suspensions
Kenya	12	0	n/a	
Sudan	6	0	n/a	
Zambia	6	0	n/a	
Tanzania	3	1	S. Abubakar vs Uganda straight red card	S. Abubakar vs Kenya
Uganda	3	0	n/a	
Ethiopia	2	0	n/a	
Somalia	2	0	n/a	
Eritrea	1	0	n/a	
Rwanda	1	0	n/a	
South Sudan	1	0	n/a	
Zanzibar	1	0	n/a	
Burundi	0	0	n/a	
Total	38	1	n/a	

=== By individual ===
Name	Team	Red	Yellow	Suspended for match(es):
Salum Abubakar	Tanzania	1	0	vs Kenya (SF)
Aboud Omar	Kenya	0	3	
Rodrick Kabwe	Zambia	0	2	
James Situma	Kenya	0	2	
Faris Abdalla	Sudan	0	1	
Miaaz Abdelrahim	Sudan	0	1	
Tesfaye Addisalem	Ethiopia	0	1	
Saladin Bargicho	Ethiopia	0	1	
Ali Maky El Rayah	Sudan	0	1	
Jimmy Eresto	South Sudan	0	1	
Haile Goitom	Eritrea	0	1	
Mohammed Abdi Hayow	Somalia	0	1	
Amir Kamal	Sudan	0	1	
Ronald Kampamba	Zambia	0	1	
Felix Katongo	Zambia	0	1	
Hamis Kiiza	Uganda	0	1	
Paul Kiongera	Kenya	0	1	
Geoffrey Kizito	Uganda	0	1	
Edwin Lavatsa	Kenya	0	1	
Sabri-Ali Makame	Zanzibar	0	1	
Malik Mohammed	Sudan	0	1	
Sidi Mohamed	Somalia	0	1	
Said Hussein Moradi	Tanzania	0	1	
Jean-Baptiste Mugiraneza	Rwanda	0	1	
Christopher Munthali	Zambia	0	1	
Bornwell Mwape	Zambia	0	1	
Duncan Ochieng	Kenya	0	1	
Peter Opiyo	Kenya	0	1	
David Owino	Kenya	0	1	
Nicholas Wadada	Uganda	0	1	
Kelvin Yondan	Tanzania	0	1	

== Overall statistics ==
Bold numbers indicate maximum values in each column.

Team	Pld	W	D	L	Pts	APts	GF	AGF	GA	AGA	GD	AGD	CS	ACS	YC	AYC	RC	ARC
Burundi	4	1	1	2	4	1.00	2	0.50	2	0.50	0	0.00	2	0.50	0	0.00	0	0.00
Eritrea	3	0	0	**3**	0	0.00	0	0.00	**7**	**2.33**	−7	−2.33	0	0.00	1	0.33	0	0.00
Ethiopia	4	2	1	1	7	1.75	5	1.25	3	0.75	+2	0.50	2	0.50	2	0.50	0	0.00
**Kenya**	**6**	**5**	1	0	**16**	**2.67**	**9**	1.50	1	0.17	**+8**	**1.33**	**5**	**0.83**	**12**	**2.00**	0	0.00
Rwanda	4	1	0	**3**	3	0.75	1	0.25	3	0.75	−2	−0.50	1	0.25	1	0.25	0	0.00
Somalia	3	0	0	**3**	0	0.00	0	0.00	**7**	**2.33**	−7	−2.33	0	0.00	2	0.67	0	0.00
South Sudan	3	0	0	**3**	0	0.00	2	0.67	**7**	**2.33**	−5	−1.67	0	0.00	1	0.33	0	0.00
Sudan	**6**	4	0	2	12	2.00	8	1.33	4	0.67	+4	0.67	3	0.50	6	1.00	0	0.00
Tanzania	**6**	2	**3**	1	9	1.50	6	1.00	5	0.83	+1	0.17	2	0.33	3	0.50	**1**	**0.17**
Uganda	4	3	1	0	10	2.50	7	**1.75**	2	0.50	+5	1.25	3	0.75	3	0.75	0	0.00
Zambia	**6**	2	**3**	1	9	1.50	8	1.33	4	0.67	+4	0.67	3	0.50	6	1.00	0	0.00
Zanzibar	3	1	0	2	3	1.00	3	1.00	6	2.00	−3	−1.00	0	0.00	1	0.33	0	0.00
Total	26^{(1)}	21	5^{(2)}	21	73	1.40	51	0.98	51	0.98	0	0.00	21	0.40	38	0.73	1	0.02

Updated to games played on 12 December 2013. Team(s) rendered in italics represent(s) the host nation(s). The competition's winning team is rendered in bold.
^{(1)} – Total games lost not counted in total games played (total games lost = total games won)
^{(2)} – Total number of games drawn (tied) for all teams = Total number of games drawn (tied) ÷ 2 (both teams involved)
^{(3)} – As per statistical convention in football, matches decided in extra time are counted as wins and losses, while matches decided by penalty shoot-outs are counted as draws.

== See also ==
- 2013 CECAFA Cup schedule
