= 2013 CECAFA Cup knockout stage =

Football tournament knockout stage

The knockout stage of the 2013 CECAFA Cup began on 7 December with the quarter-finals and ended on 12 December with the final. Matches were played at the Mombasa Municipal Stadium in Mombasa and the Nyayo National Stadium in Nairobi. The Moi Stadium in Kisumu was originally scheduled to host the semi-finals, but the matches were moved to the Kenyatta Stadium in Machakos and the Mombasa Municipal Stadium to allow the stadium to be completely refurbished.

== Format ==
The knockout stage involves the eight teams which advanced from the group stage: the top two teams from each group and the two best third-placed teams.

In this stage, teams play against each other once. The losers of the semi-finals play against each other in the third place playoff where the winners are placed third overall in the entire competition.

Of the Ksh. 8.7 million (approx. US$ 100,000) that has been allocated for prize money, the winners will receive Ksh. 5.6 million, while the runners-up will take home Ksh. 2.5 million. The third place playoff winners will receive Ksh. 600,000.

=== Match rules ===
==== Quarter-finals, third place playoff and final ====
- Regulation time is 90 minutes.
- If scores are still level after regulation time, there will be no extra time and a Penalty shoot-out decides the winner.
- Each team is allowed to have seven named substitutes.
- Each team is allowed to make a maximum of three substitutions.

==== Semi-finals ====
- Regulation time is 90 minutes.
- If scores are still level after regulation time, there will be 30 minutes of extra time and a Penalty shoot-out thereafter if scores are still level after extra time to decide the winner.
- Each team is allowed to have seven named substitutes.
- Each team is allowed to make a maximum of three substitutions.

== Bracket ==
Quarter-finals
7 December – Mombasa
Uganda	2 (2)
Tanzania (pen.)	2 (3)
7 December – Mombasa
Kenya	1
Rwanda	0
8 December – Mombasa
Zambia (pen.)	0 (4)
Burundi	0 (3)
8 December – Mombasa
Ethiopia	0
Sudan	2

Semi-finals
10 December – Nairobi
Tanzania	0
Kenya	1
10 December – Mombasa
Zambia	1
Sudan	2

Final
12 December – Nairobi
Kenya	2
Sudan	0
Third place
12 December – Nairobi
Zambia (pen.)	1 (6)
Tanzania	1 (5)

== Fixtures ==
=== Quarter-finals ===
7 December 2013
14:00

Uganda	2–2	Tanzania
Sserunkuma 16'; Mutumba 73'	Report	Ngasa 19', 40'; Abubakar (red card) 52'
Penalties
Walusimbi (penalty missed); Okwi (penalty scored); Aucho (penalty missed); Kiiza (penalty scored); Sserunkuma (penalty missed)	2–3	(penalty missed) Nyoni; (penalty missed) Samatta; (penalty scored) Kiemba; (penalty scored) Idd; (penalty scored) Yondan

Mombasa Municipal Stadium, Mombasa
Referee: Hagi Wiish (Somalia)

7 December 2013
16:00

Kenya	1–0	Rwanda
Atudo 56' (pen.); Akumu (yellow card) 57'; Opiyo (yellow card) 70'	Report

Mombasa Municipal Stadium, Mombasa
Referee: Luleseghed Ghebremichael (Eritrea)

8 December 2013
14:00

Zambia	0–0	Burundi
Munthali (yellow card) 52'	Report
Penalties
Katongo (penalty scored); Mwape (penalty scored); Ngonga (penalty missed); Mtonga (penalty scored); Chongo (penalty missed); Situmbeko (penalty scored)	4–3	(penalty scored) Duhayindavyi; (penalty scored) Nduwarugira; (penalty missed) Mossi; (penalty missed) Harerimana; (penalty scored) Abdul Razak; (penalty missed) Hakizimana

Mombasa Municipal Stadium, Mombasa
Referee: Denis Batte (Uganda)

8 December 2013
16:00

Ethiopia	0–2	Sudan
Addisalem (yellow card) 67'	Report	Mohammed (yellow card) 10'; Bargecho 22' (o.g.); El Rayah (yellow card) 37'; Ibrahim 69'; Abdelrahim (yellow card) 75'

Mombasa Municipal Stadium, Mombasa
Referee: Davies Omweno (Kenya)

=== Semi-finals ===
10 December 2013
19:00

Tanzania	0–1	Kenya
	Report	Miheso 3'; Situma (yellow card) 40'; Lavatsa (yellow card) 62'; Ochieng (yellow card) 90'

Nyayo National Stadium, Nairobi
Referee: Thierry Nkurunziza (Burundi)

10 December 2013
16:00

Zambia	1–2 (a.e.t.)	Sudan
Kabwe (yellow card) 43'; Katongo (yellow card) 68'; Kampamba 113'	Report	Abdelrahim 117'; Ibrahim 120'

Mombasa Municipal Stadium, Mombasa
Referee: Hagi Wiish (Somalia)

=== Third place playoff ===
12 December 2013
14:00

Tanzania	1–1	Zambia
Unconfirmed (yellow card) ?'; Samatta 65'	Report	Kampamba 52'
Penalties
Samatta (penalty scored); Nyoni (penalty scored); Abubakar (penalty scored); Kiemba (penalty scored); Chanongo (penalty missed); Singano (penalty scored); Ngasa (penalty missed); Yondan (penalty missed)	5–6	(penalty scored) Katongo; (penalty scored) Kampamba; (penalty missed) Zulu; (penalty scored) Chama; (penalty scored) Situmbeko; (penalty scored) Kabwe; (penalty missed) Mtonga; (penalty scored) Chongo

Nyayo National Stadium, Nairobi
Referee: Kheirala Murtaz (Sudan)

=== Final ===
12 December 2013
18:00

Kenya	2–0	Sudan
Wanga 35', 69'; Omar (yellow card) 38'; Opiyo (yellow card) 86'; Kiongera (yellow card) 90+4'	Report	Kamal (yellow card) 44'

Nyayo National Stadium, Nairobi
Referee: Hagi Wiish (Somalia)

== Top scorers (at the knockout stage) ==
2 goals

- (Kenya) Allan Wanga
- (Sudan) Salah Ibrahim
- (Tanzania) Mrisho Ngasa
- (Zambia) Ronald Kampamba

1 goal

- (Kenya) Jockins Atudo
- (Kenya) Clifton Miheso
- (Sudan) Miaaz Abdelrahim
- (Tanzania) Mbwana Samatta
- (Uganda) Martin Kayongo-Mutumba
- (Uganda) Dan Sserunkuma

1 own goal

- (Ethiopia) Saladin Bargecho (playing against Sudan)
