= 2013 CECAFA Cup final =

- Event: 2013 CECAFA Cup
Kenya	Sudan
(Kenya)	(Sudan)
2	0
- Date: 12 December 2013
- Venue: Nyayo National Stadium, Nairobi, Kenya
- Man of the Match: Allan Wanga
- Referee: Hagi Wiish (Somalia)
- Weather: Cloudy/Rainy; 16 °C (61 °F)

The 2013 CECAFA Cup final was a football match that took place on Thursday, 12 December 2013 at the Nyayo National Stadium in Nairobi to coincide with Kenya's 50th Jamhuri Day celebrations. It was contested by the hosts Kenya and Sudan to determine the winner of the 2013 CECAFA Cup.

== Background ==
Prior to the match, the two nations had 8 titles between them, with Kenya claiming 5 titles, 8 less than the record 13 titles held by Uganda, who were knocked out by Tanzania in the quarter-finals. This was Sudan's first participation in a CECAFA Cup final since 2007, when they beat Rwanda 1–0 to clinch their 3rd title. This was also the first time the two nations faced each other in a final, and was Kenya's first win in 11 years.

== Road to the final ==
=== Kenya ===
Kenya, who were hosting the tournament as part of its celebrations of 50 years of independence, were drawn into Group A alongside Ethiopia and South Sudan, whom they were with in the same group the previous year, as well as Zanzibar. They began their campaign against Ethiopia on 27 November, with whom they drew 0–0 despite both teams having several chances to win the game. The next match against South Sudan proved to be a relatively easier affair for the Harambee Stars, who won the game 3–1 at the Nyayo National Stadium thanks to goals from Jockins Atudo, 2013 Kenyan Premier League top scorer Jacob Keli and David Owino, despite Atudo's goal being cancelled out by Richard Justin in the 26th minute. Kenya beat Zanzibar 2–0 in their last group stage match at the Afraha Stadium in Nakuru, through Jockins Atudo's second goal from the penalty spot and a stunning strike from the edge of the penalty box by A.F.C. Leopards striker Allan Wanga. Since Ethiopia finished their group stage campaign with the same number of points, goal difference and goals as Kenya, a coin toss was decided on to determine the winner of Group A. Kenya won the toss and booked themselves a match against Rwanda in the quarter-finals.

In the quarter-finals, Rwanda proved to be very tough opposition for Kenya, who narrowly managed to grab a win through a penalty kick from Jockins Atudo, after the ball was handled in the box by Michel Rusheshangoga. The goal was Atudo's third goal of the tournament, his third from the penalty spot, making him Kenya's top scorer of the tournament and sending Kenya through to the semi-finals.

In their semi-final clash against Tanzania, Kenya won the game in the 3rd minute, after Thika United's Clifton Miheso pounced on a ball that was punched into his path by Gor Mahia's Ivo Mapunda. However, the Taifa Stars could've rescued their efforts in the 89th minute, but TP Mazembe's Mbwana Samatta had his shot go just above the crossbar, much to the relief of the Kenyan fans.

=== Sudan ===
Sudan were drawn into Group C alongside Eritrea, Rwanda and defending champions Uganda, who have won the tournament a record 13 times. Eritrea were Sudan's first assignment of their campaign, and easily saw them off with a 3–0 rout through first-half goals from Salah Ibrahim, who scored a brace, and Muhannad El Tahir. Megweya Omer pulled one back for Eritrea in the 73rd minute, but his goal was ruled offside. Sudan sealed their place in the quarter-finals in their second match of the group stage, where they beat Rwanda with a solitary goal in the 29th minute from Salah Ibrahim, which made him the tournament's top scorer. However, the Falcons of Jediane fell in their last match of the group stage, after being beaten 1–0 by Uganda thanks to a goal from Tusker's Khalid Aucho in the 58th minute.

Having finished in second place in Group C, Sudan booked a quarter-final match against Group A runners-up Ethiopia. Saladin Bargecho made the task at hand easier for Sudan, when he put the ball into his own net from a corner in the 22nd minute. Salah Ibrahim's fourth strike of the tournament in the 69th minute sealed the win for Sudan and a place in the semi-finals against 2012 Africa Cup of Nations champions Zambia.

Sudan's semi-final proved to be a very tough task, and 30 minutes of extra time were needed to determine the winner of the match. Ronald Kampamba gave Chipolopolo the lead in the 113th minute and the match seemed to have been tipped in Zambia's favour, but incredibly Miaaz Abdelrahim salvaged the game for Sudan with an equaliser just 2 minutes to the end of the match. Just when it seemed that a penalty shoot-out was in the offing, Salah Ibrahim stepped up for the fifth time to send Sudan to the final in dramatic fashion, after slotting the ball past goalkeeper Toaster Nsabata into the net just seconds to the final whistle.

=== Summary ===
Kenya		Round	Sudan	
Opponent	Result	Group stage	Opponent	Result
Ethiopia (H)	0–0	Matchday 1	Eritrea (H)	3–0
South Sudan (A)	1–3	Matchday 2	Rwanda (H)	1–0
Zanzibar (H)	2–0	Matchday 3	Uganda (A)	0–1
Group A winner: Team / Pld / W / D / L / GF / GA / GD / Pts; Kenya / 3 / 2 / 1 / 0 / 5 / 1 / +4 / 7; Ethiopia / 3 / 2 / 1 / 0 / 5 / 1 / +4 / 7; Zanzibar / 3 / 1 / 0 / 2 / 3 / 6 / −3 / 3; South Sudan / 3 / 0 / 0 / 3 / 2 / 7 / −5 / 0; Source:		Final standings	Group C runner-up: Team / Pld / W / D / L / GF / GA / GD / Pts; Uganda / 3 / 3 / 0 / 0 / 5 / 0 / +5 / 9; Sudan / 3 / 2 / 0 / 1 / 4 / 1 / +3 / 6; Rwanda / 3 / 1 / 0 / 2 / 1 / 2 / −1 / 3; Eritrea / 3 / 0 / 0 / 3 / 0 / 7 / −7 / 0; Source:	
Opponent	Result	Knockout stage	Opponent	Result
Rwanda (H)	1–0	Quarter-finals	Ethiopia (A)	0–2
Tanzania (A)	0–1	Semi-finals	Zambia (A)	1–2 (a.e.t.)

== Match ==
=== Summary ===
Kenya were in control for most of the match. In the 35th minute, Allan Wanga gave them the lead with a thundering header past goalkeeper Abdel Rahman Ali Ibrahim from a David Owino cross. The game remained open for the remainder of the first half and the beginning of the second half, but Wanga stepped forward again to seal the win for the Harambee Stars. In the 69th minute, Wanga beat El Tahir El Haj to get on the end of a low cross from his A.F.C. Leopards teammate James Situma and slot it into the far post.

The match, alongside Sudan's quarter-final clash against Ethiopia, produced the highest number of yellow cards in the tournament, with the highlights being Amir Kamal's 44th-minute yellow card for a blatant push on Aboud Omar, who was booked in the 38th minute, and Paul Kiongera's booking just seconds after coming on for Francis Kahata, 4 minutes into added time, for dissent. After the match, Wanga received the Man of the Match award.

=== Details ===
12 December 2013
18:30 UTC+3

Kenya	2–0	Sudan
Wanga 35', 69'	Report

Nyayo National Stadium, Nairobi
Referee: Hagi Wiish (Somalia)

Kenya	Sudan

GK	18	Duncan Ochieng
RB	2	James Situma
CB	15	David Owino
CB	14	Jockins Atudo
LB	3	Aboud Omar	(yellow card) 38'
DM	4	Teddy Akumu
RM	20	Edwin Lavatsa
CM	7	Peter Opiyo	(yellow card) 86'
LM	13	Clifton Miheso		(substituted off) 87'
SS	10	Francis Kahata		(substituted off) 90+3'
CF	11	Allan Wanga (c)		(substituted off) 80'
Substitutes:
GK	1	Jerim Onyango
DF	5	David King'atua
DF	8	Mulinge Ndeto
DF	19	Musa Mohamed
MF	12	David Gateri		(substituted on) 87'
MF	17	Paul Kiongera	(yellow card) 90+4'	(substituted on) 90+3'
FW	6	Noah Wafula		(substituted on) 80'
Head coach:
(Algeria) Adel Amrouche

GK	1	Abdel Rahman
CB	6	Ali Maki El Rayah
CB	19	Amer Kamal	(yellow card) 44'
CB	5	Malik Mohammed
RWB	2	El Tahir El Haj
LWB	3	Faris Abdalla		(substituted off) 71'
RM	4	Hamouda Bashir (c)
CM	12	Salah Ibrahim
CM	8	Ismail El Siddig
LM	10	Muhannad El Tahir
CF	11	Nadir Eltayeb		(substituted off) 62'
Substitutes:
GK	16	Muner El Khair
GK	20	Abdalla El Zubair
DF	14	Idriss Suleiman
MF	7	Mohamed Abdelkarim
MF	18	Miaaz Abdelrahim		(substituted on) 71'
FW	9	Mohamed Marhoum		(substituted on) 62'
FW	17	Mujahid Faroug
Head coach:
Mubarak Suleiman

Assistant referees:
Mussie Kindie (Ethiopia)
Mark Ssonko (Uganda)
Fourth official:
Waziri Sheha (Zanzibar)

Match rules

- 90 minutes.
- Penalty shoot-out if scores still level.
- Seven named substitutes.
- Maximum of three substitutions.

== See also ==
- 2013 Kagame Interclub Cup Final
