= 2013 CECAFA Cup group stage =

The group stage of the 2013 CECAFA Cup began on 27 November and ended on 5 December. The matchdays were 27–29 November, 30 November–2 December and 3–5 December.

The group stage featured 11 CECAFA associations and COSAFA member Zambia as the invited association. Teams were drawn into groups of four, where the top two teams from each group and the two best third-placed teams would advance to the knockout stage.

Group stage matches were scheduled to be held in Nairobi, Machakos and Nakuru.

== Fixtures ==
=== Tiebreakers ===
The order of tie-breakers used when two or more teams have equal number of points is:

1. Number of points obtained in games between the teams involved;
2. Goal difference in games between the teams involved;
3. Goals scored in games between the teams involved;
4. Away goals scored in games between the teams involved;
5. Goal difference in all games;
6. Goals scored in all games;
7. Drawing of lots.

Key to colours in group tables
Group winners and runners-up advance to the quarter-finals
Third-placed teams to be ranked for advancement to the quarter-finals
Team already eliminated

=== Group A ===
Since Kenya and Ethiopia could not be separated using the tie-breaking criteria, a coin toss was used as the drawing of lots to determine the winner of Group A.

Team	Pld	W	D	L	GF	GA	GD	Pts
Kenya	3	2	1	0	5	1	+4	7
Ethiopia	3	2	1	0	5	1	+4	7
Zanzibar	3	1	0	2	3	6	−3	3
South Sudan	3	0	0	3	2	7	−5	0

27 November 2013
14:00

Zanzibar	2–1	South Sudan
Kassim 5'; Saleh 69'	Report	Lako 75'

Nyayo National Stadium, Nairobi

27 November 2013
16:30

Kenya	0–0	Ethiopia
Owino (yellow card) 30'; Omar (yellow card) 43'	Report	Bargecho (yellow card) 90+2'

Nyayo National Stadium, Nairobi
Referee: Denis Batte (Uganda)

30 November 2013
14:00

Ethiopia	3–1	Zanzibar
Asfan 5'; Bargecho 37' (pen.); Kebede 83'	Report	Juma 68'

Nyayo National Stadium, Nairobi
Referee: Louis Hakizimana (Rwanda)

30 November 2013
16:00

South Sudan	1–3	Kenya
Eresto (yellow card) 15'; Lado 28'	Report	Atudo 17' (pen.); Keli 29'; Omar (yellow card) 72'; Owino 77'

Nyayo National Stadium, Nairobi
Referee: Waziri Sheha (Zanzibar)

3 December 2013
14:00

South Sudan	0–2	Ethiopia
	Report	Yassin 54'; Kalbore 83'

Kenyatta Stadium, Machakos
Referee: Louis Hakizimana (Rwanda)

3 December 2013
16:00

Kenya	2–0	Zanzibar
Atudo 5' (pen.); Situma (yellow card) 50'; Wanga 61'	Report	Makame (yellow card) 66'

Kenyatta Stadium, Machakos
Referee: Hagi Wiish (Somalia)

=== Group B ===
Team	Pld	W	D	L	GF	GA	GD	Pts
Zambia	3	2	1	0	6	1	+5	7
Tanzania	3	2	1	0	3	1	+2	7
Burundi	3	1	0	2	2	2	0	3
Somalia	3	0	0	3	0	7	−7	0

28 November 2013
14:00

Burundi	2–0	Somalia
Nduwarugira 41'; Abdul Razak 54'	Report

Kenyatta Stadium, Machakos
Referee: Luleseghed Ghebremichael (Eritrea)

28 November 2013
16:00

Tanzania	1–1	Zambia
Morad 47'	Report	Kampamba 41'

Kenyatta Stadium, Machakos

1 December 2013
14:00

Somalia	0–1	Tanzania
Hayow (yellow card) 33'; Mohammed (yellow card) 41'	Report	Chanongo 57'; Moradi (yellow card) 81'

Nyayo National Stadium, Nairobi
Referee: Kheirala Murtaz (Sudan)

1 December 2013
16:00

Zambia	1–0	Burundi
Kampamba (yellow card) 3'; Mwape (yellow card) 43'; Mbewe 67'	Report

Nyayo National Stadium, Nairobi
Referee: Denis Batte (Uganda)

4 December 2013
14:00

Tanzania	1–0	Burundi
Samatta 7'; Yondan (yellow card) 36'	Report

Afraha Stadium, Nakuru
Referee: Davies Omweno (Kenya)

4 December 2013
16:00

Somalia	0–4	Zambia
	Report	Mwape 2', 55'; Mbewe 4', 70'; Kabwe (yellow card) 33'

Afraha Stadium, Nakuru
Referee: Anthony Ogwayo (Kenya)

=== Group C ===
Team	Pld	W	D	L	GF	GA	GD	Pts
Uganda	3	3	0	0	5	0	+5	9
Sudan	3	2	0	1	4	1	+3	6
Rwanda	3	1	0	2	1	2	−1	3
Eritrea	3	0	0	3	0	7	−7	0

29 November 2013
14:00

Sudan	3–0	Eritrea
Ibrahim 6', 27'; El Tahir 33'; Abdalla (yellow card) 45'	Report

Kenyatta Stadium, Machakos

29 November 2013
16:00

Uganda	1–0	Rwanda
Kiiza (yellow card) 33'; Wadada (yellow card) 56'; Sserunkuma 89'	Report	Mugiraneza (yellow card) 72'

Nyayo National Stadium, Nairobi

2 December 2013
14:00

Sudan	1–0	Rwanda
Kamal (yellow card) 23'; Ibrahim 29'	Report

Kenyatta Stadium, Machakos

2 December 2013
16:00

Eritrea	0–3	Uganda
	Report	Okwi 9', 38'; Kiiza 20' (pen.); Kizito (yellow card) 56'

Kenyatta Stadium, Machakos

5 December 2013
14:00

Rwanda	1–0	Eritrea
Ndahinduka 74'	Report	Goitom (yellow card) 55'

Afraha Stadium, Nakuru

5 December 2013
16:00

Uganda	1–0	Sudan
Aucho 58'	Report

Afraha Stadium, Nakuru

=== Third place qualification ===
In addition to the group stage winners and runners-up, the two best third-placed teams will be ranked at the end of the group stage to determine who will qualify for the knockout stage.

Team	Pld	W	D	L	GF	GA	GD	Pts
Burundi	3	1	0	2	2	2	0	3
Rwanda	3	1	0	2	1	2	−1	3
Zanzibar	3	1	0	2	3	6	−3	3

== Top scorers (at the group stage) ==
3 goals

- (Sudan) Salah Ibrahim
- (Zambia) Festus Mbewe

2 goals

- (Kenya) Jockins Atudo
- (Uganda) Emmanuel Okwi
- (Zambia) Bornwell Mwape

1 goal

- (Burundi) Fiston Abdul Razak
- (Burundi) Christophe Nduwarugira
- (Ethiopia) Fasika Asfaw
- (Ethiopia) Saladin Bargecho
- (Ethiopia) Biruk Kalbore
- (Ethiopia) Yonatan Kebede
- (Ethiopia) Yussuf Saleh
- (Kenya) Jacob Keli
- (Kenya) David Owino
- (Kenya) Allan Wanga
- (Rwanda) Michel Ndahinduka
- (South Sudan) Richard Justin Lado
- (South Sudan) Fabiano Lako
- (Sudan) Muhannad El Tahir
- (Tanzania) Haruna Chanongo
- (Tanzania) Said Morad
- (Tanzania) Mbwana Samatta
- (Uganda) Khalid Aucho
- (Uganda) Hamis Kiiza
- (Uganda) Dan Sserunkuma
- (Zambia) Ronald Kampamba
- (Zanzibar) Awadh Juma Issa
- (Zanzibar) Abdi Kassim
- (Zanzibar) Adeyum Saleh
