= 2013 FKF President's Cup final =

GOtv Shield final
- Event: 2013 FKF President's Cup
Gor Mahia	A.F.C. Leopards
0	1
- Date: 17 November 2013
- Venue: Nyayo National Stadium, Nairobi
- Man of the Match: Noah Wafula
- Referee: Davies Omweno
- Weather: Sunny; 22 °C (72 °F)

The 2013 FKF President's Cup final was the 42nd final of the FKF President's Cup. The football match took place on Sunday, 17 November 2013 at 3:00 PM local time, and was contested by Gor Mahia and A.F.C. Leopards.

By winning the match, Leopards denied their opponents a league and cup double, and will represent Kenya at the 2014 CAF Confederation Cup. The two teams will face off again in the first Nairobi derby match of the 2014 season at the Kenyan Super Cup.

== Background ==
The Nairobi derby between Gor Mahia and A.F.C. Leopards is the biggest rivalry in the history of Kenyan football, having already met 75 times in all competitions since their first match on 5 May 1968, with Leopards winning 25 against Gor Mahia's 22. The final will be the final derby match of the 2013 season.

== Road to the final ==
=== Gor Mahia ===
Round	Opponent	Score
2nd	Shabana Kisii (H)	6–0
3rd	Thika United (H)	2–0
QF	Western Stima (H)	2–0
SF	Sony Sugar (H)	0–0 (4–2 p)

Beginning their President's Cup campaign in the second round as a Premier League team, Gor Mahia played their first match against FKF Division One side Shabana Kisii on 11 September. The match ended in a 6–0 rout in favour of the Nairobi side, with braces from Kevin Omondi and Ugandan international Dan Sserunkuma and goals from Angelo Okumu and Edwin Lavatsa at the Nyayo National Stadium cementing their place in the third round.

Gor Mahia's next opponents were fellow Premier League side Thika United. It took K'Ogalo 50 minutes to break the deadlock in the match played at the Nairobi City Stadium, when Kenyan international Patrick Oboya, who went on to win the man of the match award, neatly chipped the ball over goalkeeper Lucas Indeche to give his side the lead. After only 8 minutes, Sserunkuma got himself on the scoresheet again to seal the victory and book them a quarter-final clash with Kakamega side Western Stima.

In the quarter-final played on 12 October at the Nyayo National Stadium, Sserunkuma emerged the hero for Gor Mahia once again, netting a brace to send his side to the semi-finals. The diminutive Ugandan forward scored twice in the last 7 minutes of the first half and helped his side hold on to their lead in the second half, in which Edwin Lavatsa almost made it 3–0, having his shot punched away for a corner in the 72nd minute by David Juma.

The semi-final match against Sony Sugar proved to be a very tough affair for Gor Mahia, who had to win the game on a penalty shoot-out. Their star striker and the competition's top scorer Dan Sserunkuma was ruled out just minutes before the game, picking up a slight injury while warming up for the 2013 Kenyan Premier League champions and having to be replaced by Paul Kiongera. Just 6 minutes after kick-off, Gor Mahia had a golden opportunity to snatch the lead after Kiongera was brought down in the box by Charles Odette, who was booked for the offence. However, Kevin Omondi had his penalty kick saved by Wycliffe Kasaya, and the score remained 0–0. Former Thika United and Tusker striker Moses Arita could have also taken the lead for Sony Sugar at the other end, but had his shot easily picked up by Tanzanian international Ivo Mapunda in the 33rd minute.

The second half proved to be just as eventful as the first, with Gor Mahia's first chance of the half coming just 1 minute after the break through a free kick, which Omondi struck wide. Arita had another good chance to grab his side's first goal of the game, but after heading well from a cross from the right wing by Marwa Chamberi, the ball was cleared off the line by Israel Emuge. Sony Sugar then went on the defensive for the rest of the match, placing their hopes on a penalty shoot-out win after 90 minutes. However, goals from Chamberi and Wycliffe Nyangech were not enough to save the Awendo side from defeat, as David Owino scored the winning penalty for Gor Mahia after Odette and Ben Barasa missed their penalties. Patrick Oboya, who replaced Kiongera during the course of the match, Omondi and Joseph Wanyonyi had also put their penalties at the back of the net prior to Owino. The match was suddenly shrouded in controversy after the shoot-out, when Gor Mahia fans invaded the pitch in celebration and attacked Sony Sugar players. The incident left Kasaya and several other Sony Sugar players injured and admitted in hospital. However, the Football Kenya Federation (FKF) took no action against Gor Mahia, but the Kenya Footballers Welfare Association called for heightened security for the final, and the FKF announced plans to ensure a safe match a week before the final.

=== A.F.C. Leopards ===
Round	Opponent	Score
2nd	Wazee wa Kazi (H)	5–0
3rd	Chemelil Sugar (A)	0–1
QF	Karuturi Sports (A)	0–3
SF	Sofapaka (A)	0–2

Gaining automatic entry to the second round as a Premier League team, Ingwe began their President's Cup campaign with a 5–0 rout of Provincial League side Wazee wa Kazi, thanks to goals from Mike Baraza, Allan Wanga, Noah Wafula, Oscar Kadenge and Peter Opiyo.

Leopards then had to face Chemelil Sugar, a team they hadn't beaten in 12 years, in the third round away from home. However, Leopards looked the better side in the first half, creating a good chance just 8 minutes into the game, but captain Martin Imbalambala had his shot blocked. Wanga scored the first goal in the 20th minute after having the ball cut back from the left wing for him by Paul Were, but the referee disallowed the goal, with the linesman saying the ball had gone out of play at the time Were made the pass. In the second half, Chemelil Sugar looked more dangerous on the attack and emerged as the better side. 6 minutes after the break, Jared Obwoge almost took the lead for his side, but headed wide off a corner. Obwoge had another chances 6 minutes later but put his shot wide of the far post to give Leopards a goal kick. However, their efforts would prove to be in vain, when in the 74th minute Charles Okwemba rose above his opponents to head home a corner from Abdallah Juma. Wanga almost made it 2–0 just 4 minutes later, but goalkeeper Jairus Adira came off his line to deal with Mike Baraza's cross. The narrow win took them to the quarter-finals, where they would face Karuturi Sports.

The quarter-final seemed to be a much easier task for Ingwe. Their first chance of the game came early in the 3rd minute, but Noah Wafula put his shot wide after combining well with Wanga. The first goal came just 3 minutes later, when skipper Imbalambala caused a mix-up in the box after connecting a header from a free kick by Kadenge, during which Okwemba put the ball in the back of the net. Just 2 minutes later, Wanga put his side 2–0 up after dribbling past Geoffrey Msiebe and slotting his shot low past Michael Wanyika. Wanga then added to his tally in the second half after finishing off a cross from Were from the left flank. However, Leopards could have conceded in the second half, with John Kiplagat heading on target the first of Karuturi's chances from an Amon Muchiri free kick, only to be calmly handled by goalkeeper Martin Musalia. Player-coach Jacob Omondi could have also grabbed one for his side, but could not find himself on the end of a good pass from Kiplagat.

In the semi-final against Sofapaka, Leopards drew first blood in the 39th minute after a flurry of chances from both teams, when Mike Baraza sent Wanga off to the goalmouth with a well-played through pass. Goalkeeper Duncan Ochieng rushed out to clear the pass, but missed the ball, leaving himself embarrassed and Wanga with an open goal. It was during the second half where Leopards sealed their victory, after Were won the ball in the midfield to find Wafula, who blasted the ball into the top of the net and cemented their place in the final.

== Match ==
=== Pre-match ===
Before the match took place, a "legends" match between former members of both teams was played. After a goalless 30 minutes of play, Gor Mahia won the match 2–1 on penalties, with the winning penalties coming from Sony Sugar coach Sammy Omollo and Oti Maua. Francis Xavier scored his penalty for A.F.C. Leopards but Mike Amwayi and Nicholas Muyoti both shot wide.

=== First half ===
The first half began on a strong note, with Leopards creating the first chance of the game in the 3rd minute. Paul Were's attack forced goalkeeper Jerim Onyango to lose the ball, but the skipper saved the second shot and conceded the first corner. Gor Mahia then responded a few minutes later through a surging run by Dan Sserunkuma, but did not find enough time to take a shot on goal. Going into the 20th minute, both sides had good chances to go ahead, with Leopards' Charles Okwemba and Gor Mahia's Sserunkuma and Innocent Mutiso all putting their shots wide. Abdallah Juma could have gotten the lead for Leopards in the 28th minute, but had his free kick well saved by Onyango.

Arguably the best chance for A.F.C. Leopards came in the 38th minute after Augustine Etemesi's cross from the right wing found Wanga, whose shot rolled just inches wide under considerable pressure. On the other end, Anthony Akumu almost headed Gor Mahia into the lead from a corner taken by Mutiso, but the cross was quickly punched away by Martin Musalia in the last minute of the half.

=== Second half ===
At the beginning of the second half, Sserunkuma had a good chance to score for Gor Mahia, but had his low driven shot easily collected by Musalia. Leopards then capitalised on Gor Mahia's exposed defence, when Noah Wafula made a run down the right wing and received the ball to set up Peter Opiyo, who put his shot away in the 52nd minute. Just 5 minutes later, Gor Mahia would have gone down by 2 goals, but captain Onyango was equal to the task when Juma got a shot on goal after being released on a surging run by Allan Wanga.

Musalia could have cost his side the equaliser in the 65th minute after fumbling the ball. However, Musa Mohammed's attack was well dealt with by Etemesi. 10 minutes later on the other end, Wafula had run down the right wing once again but instead of setting up Wanga, who was waiting inside the box, he sent his shot well wide and gave Gor Mahia a goal kick.

In the dying minutes of the game, both sides had good chances to score. Paul Kiongera, who replaced Akumu in the 68th minute, had a shot hit the side netting, while Oscar Kadenge, who replaced Were much earlier in the 55th minute, had a weak shot easily picked up by Onyango in the 88th minute. Sserunkuma, who was heavily marked by Leopards defenders throughout the course of the second half, nearly took Gor Mahia's last chance of the game, but had his low shot picked up by Musalia in the second minute of added time.

=== Details ===
17 November 2013
15:00 UTC+3

Gor Mahia	0 – 1	A.F.C. Leopards
	Report	Opiyo 52'

Nyayo National Stadium, Nairobi
Referee: Davies Omweno

Gor Mahia:
GK	1	Jerim Onyango (c)
RB	15	David Owino
CB	5	Musa Mohammed
CB	4	Donald Mosoti
LB	24	Israel Emuge	(yellow card) 18'
CM	6	Anthony Akumu		(substituted off) 68'
CM	17	Eric Ochieng
CM	20	Joseph Njuguna
RW	7	Joseph Wanyonyi		(substituted off) 68'
CF	8	Dan Sserunkuma
LW	11	Innocent Mutiso		(substituted off) 70'
Substitutes:
GK	23	Joel Bataro
DF	18	Ivan Anguyo
DF	19	Solomon Nasio
MF	14	Kevin Omondi		(substituted on) 68'
MF	29	Paul Kiongera		(substituted on) 68'
MF	30	Patrick Oboya
FW	9	Edwin Lavatsa		(substituted on) 70'
Head coach:
(Scotland) Bobby Williamson

A.F.C. Leopards:
GK	16	Martin Musalia
RB	42	Anthony "Modo" Kimani
CB	20	Jackson Saleh
CB	34	Augustine Etemesi
LB	6	Abdallah Juma
DM	18	Peter Opiyo	(yellow card) 33'
DM	4	Martin Imbalambala (c)
RW	27	Noah Wafula		(substituted off) 90'
AM	10	Charles Okwemba
LW	44	Paul Were		(substituted off) 55'
CF	14	Allan Wanga
Substitutes:
GK	1	Patrick Matasi
DF	37	Abbas Kiwalabye
DF	40	Eric Masika
MF	7	Oscar Kadenge		(substituted on) 55'
MF	8	Patilah Omotto
MF	45	Mohammed Saadiq
FW	23	Michael Khamati		(substituted on) 90'
Head coach:
(Kenya) James Nandwa

Man of the Match:
Noah Wafula

Assistant referees:
Peter Kiereini
Gilbert Cheruiyot
Fourth official:
Israel Mpaima
Fifth official:
Maxim Itur

Match rules

- 90 minutes.
- Penalty shoot-out if scores still level.
- Seven named substitutes.
- Maximum of three substitutions.

=== Post-match ===
Immediately after the final whistle was blown, Leopards fans invaded the pitch in celebration and engaged their Gor Mahia counterparts in provocative banter, which resulted in stone-throwing between the two sets of fans. Several people were injured in the fray, and police were forced to use tear-gas to clear them from the pitch and the VIP section of the stadium.

After the clash between the fans, Noah Wafula was named Man of the Match and Player of the Tournament in addition to receiving a winner's medal, and won a GOtv decoder as part of the award.
