= 2013 CECAFA Cup =

GOtv CECAFA Challenge Cup

Tournament details
- Host country: Kenya
- Dates: 27 November – 12 December
- Teams: 12 (from 2 sub-confederations)
- Venue: 6 (in 4 host cities)

Final positions
- Champions: Kenya (6th title)
- Runners-up: Sudan
- Third place: Zambia
- Fourth place: Tanzania

Tournament statistics
- Matches played: 26
- Goals scored: 51 (1.96 per match)
- Top scorer(s): (Sudan) Salah Ibrahim (5 goals)

The 2013 CECAFA Cup (known as the GOtv CECAFA Challenge Cup for sponsorship reasons) was the 37th edition of the annual CECAFA Cup, an international football competition consisting of the national teams of member nations of the Council for East and Central Africa Football Associations (CECAFA). The tournament was held in Kenya from 27 November to 12 December.

Contested by twelve national teams, the tournament had Zambia invited as a guest nation to fill in for Djibouti, who failed to participate for a second consecutive year. This followed the tournament's recent tradition of inviting other African nations to take part once a CECAFA nation pulled out; Malawi were invited to take part in the previous edition held in Uganda, while they and Zimbabwe took part in 2011 after Eritrea withdrew from the competition.

Hosts Kenya ran out 2–0 winners in the final against three-time champions Sudan, with a brace from Allan Wanga securing the Harambee Stars their sixth title after losing to previous hosts Uganda at the same stage the previous year. The third place playoff was won by guests Zambia, who beat Tanzania 6–5 on penalties after playing out to a 1–1 draw after 90 minutes.

== Background and sponsorship ==
On 25 November 2012, it was announced that Kenya was chosen to host the tournament after bids were placed by the host nation as well as Rwanda. However, their hosting of the tournament was not confirmed until a congress meeting for the Confederation of African Football held in Marrakesh, Morocco on 11 March 2013, after it was announced that the Football Kenya Federation had met all the requirements for hosting the tournaments with support from the Kenyan government. The capital city Nairobi, Mombasa, Kisumu, Machakos and Nakuru were identified as host cities for the tournament.

On 21 November 2013, CECAFA announced that GOtv would be the title sponsors of the tournament, having committed KSh.11.25 million/= towards the organisation of the event and a further Ksh. 45 million towards the broadcasting of all 26 matches. Other companies that were sponsoring the tournament were Coca-Cola, who committed KSh.6.5 million/=, and UAP Insurance, who committed KSh.5.5 million/=.

Of KSh.8.7 million/= (approx. US$100,000) that was allocated for prize money, the winners were to receive KSh.5.6 million/=, while the runners-up were to take home KSh.2.5 million/=. The third place playoff winners were to receive KSh.600,000/=.

== Participants ==
The draw for teams to participate in the tournament was held during the tournament's launch on 15 November 2013. Alongside the 12 member nations of CECAFA, Ivory Coast, Malawi and Zambia were initially mooted as invitees for the tournament. However, CECAFA decided against inviting the Ivory Coast, with Secretary-General Nicholas Musonye saying that flying in Les Éléphants and keeping them in the country would cost the organisers over US$25,000. The Football Association of Malawi decided not to enter a team for the tournament due to a lack of funds.

The following teams were confirmed to participate in the tournament:

- Burundi
- Ethiopia
- Eritrea
- Kenya
- Rwanda
- Somalia
- South Sudan
- Sudan
- Tanzania
- Uganda
- Zambia (invitee)
- Zanzibar

== Match officials ==
The following 18 officials were appointed by CECAFA to participate in the tournament.

Referees

- (Burundi) Thierry Nkurunziza
- (Eritrea) Luleseghed Ghebremichael
- (Kenya) Anthony Ogwayo
- (Kenya) Davies Omweno
- (Rwanda) Louis Hakizimana
- (Somalia) Hagi Wiish
- (Sudan) Kheirala Murtaz
- (Uganda) Denis Batte
- (Zanzibar) Waziri Sheha

Assistant referees

- (Kenya) Gilbert Cheruiyot
- (Kenya) Tonny Kidiya
- (Rwanda) Simba Honore
- (Somalia) Suleiman Bashir
- (South Sudan) Frezer Sakara
- (Sudan) Mohammed Idam
- (Tanzania) Ferdinand Chacha
- (Uganda) Samuel Kayondo
- (Uganda) Mark Ssonko

== Group stage ==
The group stage began on 27 November and ended on 5 December. The matchdays were 27–29 November, 30 November–2 December and 3–5 December. If two or more teams were equal on points on completion of the group matches, the following criteria were applied to determine the rankings (in descending order):

1. Number of points obtained in games between the teams involved;
2. Goal difference in games between the teams involved;
3. Goals scored in games between the teams involved;
4. Away goals scored in games between the teams involved;
5. Goal difference in all games;
6. Goals scored in all games;
7. Drawing of lots.

Key to colours in group tables
Group winners and runners-up advance to the quarter-finals
Third-placed teams to be ranked for advancement to the quarter-finals
Team already eliminated

=== Group A ===
Since Kenya and Ethiopia had the same statistics at the end of the group stage, a coin toss was used as the drawing of lots to determine the winner of Group A.

Team	Pld	W	D	L	GF	GA	GD	Pts
Kenya	3	2	1	0	5	1	+4	7
Ethiopia	3	2	1	0	5	1	+4	7
Zanzibar	3	1	0	2	3	6	−3	3
South Sudan	3	0	0	3	2	7	−5	0

27 November 2013
Zanzibar	2–1	South Sudan	Nyayo National Stadium
Kenya	0–0	Ethiopia	Nyayo National Stadium
30 November 2013
Ethiopia	3–1	Zanzibar	Nyayo National Stadium
South Sudan	1–3	Kenya	Nyayo National Stadium
3 December 2013
South Sudan	0–2	Ethiopia	Afraha Stadium
Kenya	2–0	Zanzibar	Afraha Stadium

=== Group B ===
Team	Pld	W	D	L	GF	GA	GD	Pts
Zambia	3	2	1	0	6	1	+5	7
Tanzania	3	2	1	0	3	1	+2	7
Burundi	3	1	0	2	2	2	0	3
Somalia	3	0	0	3	0	7	−7	0

28 November 2013
Burundi	2–0	Somalia	Kenyatta Stadium
Tanzania	1–1	Zambia	Kenyatta Stadium
1 December 2013
Somalia	0–1	Tanzania	Nyayo National Stadium
Zambia	1–0	Burundi	Nyayo National Stadium
4 December 2013
Tanzania	1–0	Burundi	Afraha Stadium
Somalia	0–4	Zambia	Afraha Stadium

=== Group C ===
Team	Pld	W	D	L	GF	GA	GD	Pts
Uganda	3	3	0	0	5	0	+5	9
Sudan	3	2	0	1	4	1	+3	6
Rwanda	3	1	0	2	1	2	−1	3
Eritrea	3	0	0	3	0	7	−7	0

29 November 2013
Sudan	3–0	Eritrea	Kenyatta Stadium
Uganda	1–0	Rwanda	Nyayo National Stadium
2 December 2013
Sudan	1–0	Rwanda	Nairobi City Stadium
Eritrea	0–3	Uganda	Nairobi City Stadium
5 December 2013
Rwanda	1–0	Eritrea	Kenyatta Stadium
Uganda	1–0	Sudan	Nyayo National Stadium

=== Third place qualification ===
In addition to the group stage winners and runners-up, the two best third-placed teams will be ranked at the end of the group stage to determine who will qualify for the knockout stage.

Team	Pld	W	D	L	GF	GA	GD	Pts
Burundi	3	1	0	2	2	2	0	3
Rwanda	3	1	0	2	1	2	−1	3
Zanzibar	3	1	0	2	3	6	−3	3

== Knockout stage ==
The knockout stage began on 7 December with the quarter-finals and ended on 12 December with the final. In this stage, teams played against each other once, with the losers of the semi-finals playing against each other in a third place playoff.

=== Bracket ===
Quarter-finals
7 December – Mombasa
Uganda	2 (2)
Tanzania (pen.)	2 (3)
7 December – Mombasa
Kenya	1
Rwanda	0
8 December – Mombasa
Zambia (pen.)	0 (4)
Burundi	0 (3)
8 December – Mombasa
Ethiopia	0
Sudan	2

Semi-finals
10 December – Nairobi
Tanzania	0
Kenya	1
10 December – Mombasa
Zambia	1
Sudan	2

Final
12 December – Nairobi
Kenya	2
Sudan	0
Third place
12 December – Nairobi
Zambia (pen.)	1 (6)
Tanzania	1 (5)

=== Quarter-finals ===
The quarter-finals were played on 7–8 December.

Team 1	Score	Team 2
Uganda	2–2 (2–3 p)	Tanzania
Kenya	1–0	Rwanda
Zambia	0–0 (4–3 p)	Burundi
Ethiopia	0–2	Sudan

=== Semi-finals ===
The semi-finals were played on 10 December.

Team 1	Score	Team 2
Tanzania	0–1	Kenya
Zambia	1–2 (a.e.t.)	Sudan

=== Third place playoff ===
12 December 2013	Tanzania	1–1 (5–6 p)	Zambia	Madaraka Estate, Nairobi
14:00 UTC+3	Samatta 65'	Report	Kampamba 52'	Stadium: Nyayo National Stadium; Referee: Kheirala Murtaz (Sudan)
	Penalties
	Samatta (penalty scored); Nyoni (penalty scored); Abubakar (penalty scored); Kiemba (penalty scored); Chanongo (penalty missed); Singano (penalty scored); Ngasa (penalty missed); Yondan (penalty missed)		(penalty scored) Katongo; (penalty scored) Kampamba; (penalty missed) Zulu; (penalty scored) Chama; (penalty scored) Situmbeko; (penalty scored) Kabwe; (penalty missed) Mtonga; (penalty scored) Chongo

=== Final ===
12 December 2013	Kenya	2–0	Sudan	Madaraka Estate, Nairobi
18:00 UTC+3	Wanga 35', 69'; Omar (yellow card) 38'; Opiyo (yellow card) 86'; Kiongera (yellow card) 90+4'	Report	Kamal (yellow card) 44'	Stadium: Nyayo National Stadium; Referee: Hagi Wiish (Somalia)

2013 CECAFA Cup champions

Kenya
6th title

== Goalscorers ==
5 goals

- (Sudan) Salah Ibrahim

3 goals

- (Kenya) Jockins Atudo
- (Kenya) Allan Wanga
- (Zambia) Ronald Kampamba
- (Zambia) Festus Mbewe

2 goals

- (Tanzania) Mrisho Ngasa
- (Tanzania) Mbwana Samatta
- (Uganda) Emmanuel Okwi
- (Uganda) Dan Sserunkuma
- (Zambia) Bornwell Mwape

1 goal

- (Burundi) Fiston Abdul Razak
- (Burundi) Christophe Nduwarugira
- (Ethiopia) Fasika Asfaw
- (Ethiopia) Saladin Bargicho
- (Ethiopia) Biruk Kalbore
- (Ethiopia) Yonathan Kebede
- (Ethiopia) Yussuf Saleh
- (Kenya) Jacob Keli
- (Kenya) Clifton Miheso
- (Kenya) David Owino
- (Rwanda) Michel Ndahinduka
- (South Sudan) Richard Justin Lado
- (South Sudan) Fabiano Lako
- (Sudan) Moaaz Abdelraheem
- (Sudan) Muhannad El Tahir
- (Tanzania) Haruna Chanongo
- (Tanzania) Said Morad
- (Uganda) Khalid Aucho
- (Uganda) Hamis Kiiza
- (Uganda) Martin Kayongo-Mutumba
- (Zanzibar) Awadh Juma Issa
- (Zanzibar) Abdi Kassim
- (Zanzibar) Adeyum Saleh

1 own goal

- (Ethiopia) Saladin Bargicho (playing against Sudan)

== Final rankings ==
Teams are ranked using the same tie-breaking criteria as in the group stage, except for the top four teams.

Pos.	Team	Pld	W	D	L	Pts	GF	GA	GD
1	Kenya	6	5	1	0	16	9	1	+8
2	Sudan	6	4	0	2	12	8	4	+4
3	Zambia	6	2	3	1	9	8	4	+4
4	Tanzania	6	2	3	1	9	6	5	+1
**Eliminated in the quarter-finals**
5	Uganda	4	3	1	0	10	7	2	+5
6	Ethiopia	4	2	1	1	7	5	3	+2
7	Burundi	4	1	1	2	4	2	2	0
8	Rwanda	4	1	0	3	3	1	3	−2
**Eliminated in the group stage**
9	Zanzibar	3	1	0	2	3	3	6	−3
10	South Sudan	3	0	0	3	0	2	7	−5
=11	Eritrea	3	0	0	3	0	0	7	−7
=11	Somalia	3	0	0	3	0	0	7	−7
Total		26^{(1)}	21	5^{(2)}	21	73	49	49	0

Updated to games played on 12 December 2013. Team(s) rendered in italics represent(s) the host nation(s). The competition's winning team is rendered in bold.
^{(1)} – Total games lost not counted in total games played (total games lost = total games won)
^{(2)} – Total number of games drawn (tied) for all teams = Total number of games drawn (tied) ÷ 2 (both teams involved)
^{(3)} – As per statistical convention in football, matches decided in extra time are counted as wins and losses, while matches decided by penalty shoot-outs are counted as draws.

== See also ==
- 2013 Kagame Interclub Cup
