= Oboya =

Oboya is a surname. Notable people with the surname include:

- Bendere Oboya (born 2000), Australian athlete
- Patrick Oboya (born 1987), Kenyan footballer
