= Issouf Kaboré =

Burkinabé footballer

Personal information
- Date of birth: 4 October 1985 (age 41)
- Place of birth: Ouagadougou, Burkina Faso
- Position: Midfielder

Team information
- Current team: Étoile Filante de Ouagadougou

International career^{‡}
Years	Team	Apps	(Gls)
2012–2018	Burkina Faso	8	(2)
- ‡ National team caps and goals as of 24 May 2017

Issouf Kaboré is a Burkinabé professional footballer who plays as a midfielder for Étoile Filante de Ouagadougou and the Burkina Faso national football team.

== International career ==
In January 2014, coach Brama Traore invited him to be a part of the Burkina Faso squad for the 2014 African Nations Championship. The team was eliminated in the group stages after losing to Uganda and Zimbabwe and then drawing with Morocco.

=== International goals ===
Scores and results list Burkina Faso's goal tally first.

No	Date	Venue	Opponent	Score	Result	Competition
1.	6 July 2013	Stade du 4 Août, Ouagadougou, Burkina Faso	Niger	1–0	1–0	2014 African Nations Championship qualification
