= Mohamed Marhoum =

Sudanese footballer

Personal information
- Full name: Mohammed Abdel Monem Marhoum
- Date of birth: 1 July 1990 (age 36)
- Place of birth: Sudan
- Position: Forward

International career^{‡}
Years	Team	Apps	(Gls)
2011–	Sudan	3	(0)
Medal record
Men's football
Representing Sudan
CECAFA Cup
Runner-up	2013 Kenya
- ‡ National team caps and goals as of 02:48, 2 December 2014 (UTC)

Mohamed Marhoum (born 1 July 1990) is a Sudanese professional footballer who plays as a forward.

== Honours ==
Sudan

- CECAFA Cup: runner-up, 2013
