= Nadir Eltayeb =

Sudanese footballer

Personal information
- Full name: Nader Altayeb Jaber Alemam
- Date of birth: October 10, 1992 (age 34)
- Place of birth: Sudan
- Height: 1.77 m (5 ft 9 1/2 in)
- Position: Striker

Team information
- Current team: Al-Mourada SC
- Number: 11

Senior career*
Years	Team	Apps	(Gls)
2008-2009	Al-Ahly Shendi		
2010-2011	Al-Hilal Club		
2012-2017	Al-Ahly Shendi		
2017	Alamal SC Atbara (loan)		
2018-2020	Al Ahli SC (Khartoum)		
2020-	Al-Mourada SC		

International career
2009-	Sudan	14	(2)
Medal record
Men's football
Representing Sudan
CECAFA Cup
Runner-up	2013 Kenya
- * Club domestic league appearances and goals

Nader Altayeb is a Sudanese footballer who plays for the Sudanese club Al-Ahli Shendi in the Sudan Premier League. He plays as a striker. He was brought from Al Hilal in December 2011 on a free transfer. He was scored for Al Ahli Shendi in the 2012 CAF Confederation Cup against the Mozambican team Ferroviário de Maputo.

== International goals ==
#	Date	Venue	Opponent	Score	Result	Competition
1.	7 July 2013	Bujumbura, Burundi	Burundi	1-1	Draw	2014 African Nations Championship qualification
2.	28 July 2013	Khartoum, Sudan	Burundi	1-1	Draw	2014 African Nations Championship qualification

== Honours ==
Sudan

- CECAFA Cup: runner-up, 2013
