= Jockins Atudo =

Kenyan footballer (born 1985)

Personal information
- Full name: Jockins Atudo
- Date of birth: 8 August 1985 (age 41)
- Place of birth: Homa Bay, Kenya
- Height: 1.83 m (6 ft 0 in)
- Position: Defender

Team information
- Current team: Tusker

Senior career*
Years	Team	Apps	(Gls)
2008	Sony Sugar		
2009–2012	Tusker		
2012–2014	Azam		
2014–	Tusker		

International career^{‡}
2009–	Kenya	59	(6)
- * Club domestic league appearances and goals as of 10 May 2014 ‡ National team caps and goals as of 20 November 2019

Jockins Atudo (born 8 August 1985) is a Kenyan professional footballer who plays for Kenyan Premier League club Tusker as a defender. He previously played for Sony Sugar and Tanzanian Premier League side Azam.

Atudo has also appeared for the Kenya national team, and was part of the squad that won the 2013 CECAFA Cup. He played the full 90 minutes in the final against Sudan, and was the team's joint top scorer of the tournament alongside Allan Wanga, having scored 3 goals from the penalty spot.

== International career ==
=== International goals ===
Scores and results list Kenya's goal tally first.

No.	Date	Venue	Opponent	Score	Result	Competition
1.	8 July 2013	Arthur Davies Stadium, Kitwe, Zambia	Lesotho	3–2	3–2	2016 COSAFA Cup
2.	30 November 2013	Nyayo National Stadium, Nairobi, Kenya	South Sudan	1–0	3–1	2013 CECAFA Cup
3.	3 December 2013	Afraha Stadium, Nakuru, Kenya	Zanzibar	1–0	2–0	2013 CECAFA Cup
4.	7 December 2013	Mombasa Municipal Stadium, Mombasa, Kenya	Rwanda	1–0	1–0	2013 CECAFA Cup
5.	8 June 2018	Mumbai Football Arena, Mumbai, India	Chinese Taipei	2–0	4–0	2018 Intercontinental Cup
6.	8 June 2018	Mumbai Football Arena, Mumbai, India	Chinese Taipei	4–0	4–0	2018 Intercontinental Cup
