= 2014 African Nations Championship qualification =

The qualification phase for the 2014 African Nations Championship was played from November 2012 to August 2013. Qualification was divided into the CAF Regional Zones. Each zone had either two or three teams that qualified for the final tournament in South Africa.

== Qualification zones ==
Zone	Number of participating teams	Number of qualifying teams	Number of teams not entered
North Zone	4	2	1 (Egypt)
Zone West A	6	2	3 (Cape Verde, Gambia, Guinea-Bissau)
Zone West B	7	3	0
Central Zone	5	3	3 (Chad, Equatorial Guinea, São Tomé & Príncipe)
Central-East Zone	8	3	3 (Djibouti, Somalia, South Sudan)
Southern Zone	11 (including hosts South Africa)	3 (including hosts South Africa)	3 (Lesotho, Madagascar, Malawi)
Total	41	16	13

== North Zone ==
=== First round ===
The two winners of the first round qualify for the final tournament. Algeria withdrew due to poor squad standards.

Team 1	Agg.	Team 2	1st leg	2nd leg
Algeria	w/o *	Libya	—	—
Tunisia	0–1	Morocco	0–1	0–0

6 July 2013
20:00 UTC+1

Tunisia	0–1	Morocco
	Report	El Mobarky 89'

Stade Olympique de Sousse, Sousse
Referee: Maguette N'Diaye (Senegal)
13 July 2013
22:30 UTC±0

Morocco	0–0	Tunisia
	Report

Grand Stade de Tanger, Tanger
Referee: Tessema Weyesa (Ethiopia)

== Zone West A ==
=== Preliminary round ===
The two preliminary round winners qualify for the first round.
Mali and Senegal receive a bye and advance directly to the first round.

Team 1	Agg.	Team 2	1st leg	2nd leg
Liberia	1–3	Mauritania	0–1	1–2
Guinea	1–1	Sierra Leone	0–0	1–1

2 December 2012

Liberia	0–1	Mauritania

Referee: Sinko (Ivory Coast)
15 December 2012

Mauritania	2–1	Liberia

Referee: Djaoupe (Togo)

2 December 2012

Guinea	0–0	Sierra Leone

Referee: Boukari Ouedraogo (Burkina Faso)
14 December 2012

Sierra Leone	1–1	Guinea

Referee: Gueye (Senegal)

=== First round ===
The two winners of the first round qualify for the final tournament.

Team 1	Agg.	Team 2	1st leg	2nd leg
Senegal	1–2	Mauritania	1–0	0–2
Mali	3–2	Guinea	3–1	0–1

6 July 2013
20:00

Senegal	1–0	Mauritania
Gomis 65'

Referee: Kordi (Tunisia)
20 July 2013
TBA

Mauritania	2–0	Senegal
Bessam 45'; Denna 57'

Referee: Hama (Niger)

6 July 2013
19:00

Mali	3–1	Guinea

Referee: Zio (Burkina-Faso)
28 July 2013
15:00

Guinea	1–0	Mali
I. Camara 62'

Referee: Abid Charef (Algeria)

== Zone West B ==
=== Preliminary round ===
The preliminary round winner qualify for the first round.
Ghana, Niger, Côte d'Ivoire, Nigeria and Benin receive a bye and advance directly to the first round.

Team 1	Agg.	Team 2	1st leg	2nd leg
Burkina Faso	3–1	Togo	2–1	1–0

1 December 2012

Burkina Faso	2–1	Togo
Nébié 15'; Kaboré 90+1'	Report	Placca Fessou 80'

Stade du 4 Août, Ouagadougou
Referee: Jerry Yekeh (Liberia)
16 December 2012

Togo	0–1	Burkina Faso
	Report	Yaméogo 85'

Stade de Kégué, Lomé
Referee: Achille Madila (DR Congo)

=== First round ===
The 3 winners of the first round qualify for the final tournament. Benin withdrew from the tournament for financial reasons.

Team 1	Agg.	Team 2	1st leg	2nd leg
Benin	w/o	Ghana	—	—
Nigeria	4–3	(Ivory Coast) Côte d'Ivoire	4–1	0–2
Burkina Faso	1–1 (6–5p)	Niger	1–0	0–1

6 July 2013

Nigeria	4–1	Ivory Coast
Gambo 15'; Mba 26', 51'; Edeh 83'		Ti. Coulibaly 45'

Ahmadu Bello Stadium, Kaduna
Referee: Keita (Mali)
27 July 2013

Ivory Coast	2–0	Nigeria

Referee: El Jaafari (Morocco)

6 July 2013
18:00

Burkina Faso	1–0	Niger
Kaboré 84'

Referee: Amao (Nigeria)
27 July 2013
15:00

Niger	1–0	Burkina Faso
Sacko 90+8'
Penalties
	5–6

Referee: Tohouegnon (Benin)

Nigeria withdrew due to financial constraints on 11 April 2013, but one month later they confirmed their participation.

== Central Zone ==
=== Preliminary round ===
The preliminary round winner qualify for the first round.
DR Congo, Cameroon and Gabon receive a bye and advance directly to the first round.

Team 1	Agg.	Team 2	1st leg	2nd leg
Central African Rep. (Central African Republic)	0–3	(Republic of the Congo) Congo	w/o	0–3 *

30 November 2012

Central African Republic	Canceled	Congo

14 December 2012

Congo	3–0 *	Central African Republic

- Central African Republic withdrew. Game was awarded 3–0 to Congo.

=== First round ===
The two winners of the first round qualify for the final tournament.
The two losers of the first round qualify for the second round.

Team 1	Agg.	Team 2	1st leg	2nd leg
Cameroon	1–1 (6–7p)	Gabon	1–0	0–1
DR Congo (Democratic Republic of the Congo)	2–2	(Republic of the Congo) Congo	2–1	0–1

28 July 2013
15:00

Cameroon	1–0	Gabon
Haman 29' (pen.)

Referee: Biani (Chad)
10 August 2013
15:00

Gabon	1–0	Cameroon
Mbingui 52'
Penalties
	6–5

Referee: Gomes (South Africa)

7 July 2013
15:00

DR Congo	2–1	Congo
Mkundji 7'; Bokanga 72'		Moubhio 28'

Referee: Batte (Uganda)
28 July 2013
15:00

Congo	1–0	DR Congo
Kasereka 87' (o.g.)

Referee: Aurelien Juankou Wandji (Cameroon)

=== Second round ===
The winner of the second round qualify for the final tournament.

Team 1	Agg.	Team 2	1st leg	2nd leg
Cameroon	1–2	(Democratic Republic of the Congo) DR Congo	0–1	1–1

26 August 2013
TBA

Cameroon	0–1	DR Congo
		Mubele 65'

Referee: Khalid Abdel Rahman (Sudan)
30 August 2013
TBA

DR Congo	1–1	Cameroon
Ebunga-Simbi 31'		Ebah 60'

Referee: Youssef Essrayri (Tunisia)

== Central-East Zone ==
=== Preliminary round ===
The two preliminary round winners qualify for the first round.
Sudan, Uganda, Rwanda and Tanzania receive a bye and advance directly to the first round.

Team 1	Agg.	Team 2	1st leg	2nd leg
Burundi	1–0	Kenya	1–0	0–0
Ethiopia	3–0	Eritrea	3–0 *	w/o

16 December 2012

Burundi	1–0	Kenya
Ndayishimiye 29'	Report

Referee: Gervais Munyanziza (Rwanda)
6 January 2013

Kenya	0–0	Burundi

Referee: Mohamed Ali Adelaid (Comoros)

14 December 2012

Ethiopia	3–0 *	Eritrea

5 January 2013

Eritrea	Canceled	Ethiopia

- Eritrea withdrew on December 5, 2012. Game was awarded 3–0 to Ethiopia.

=== First round ===
The 3 winners of the first round qualify for the final tournament.

Team 1	Agg.	Team 2	1st leg	2nd leg
Burundi	2–2 (4–3p)	Sudan	1–1	1–1
Ethiopia	1–1 (6–5p)	Rwanda	1–0	0–1
Tanzania	1–4	Uganda	0–1	1–3

7 July 2013
15:30

Burundi	1–1	Sudan
		Nadir Eltayeb (?)

Referee: Munyemana (Rwanda)
28 July 2013
15:00

Sudan	1–1	Burundi
Nadir Eltayeb (?)
Penalties
	3–4

Referee: Ghebremichael (Eritrea)

14 July 2013
15:00

Ethiopia	1–0	Rwanda
Asrat 57'	Report

Addis Ababa Stadium, Addis Ababa
Referee: Davies Omweno (Kenya)
27 July 2013
15:00

Rwanda	1–0	Ethiopia
Ndahinduka 68'	Report
Penalties
	5–6

Kigali Pelé Stadium, Kigali
Referee: Wiish Hagi Yabarow (Somalia)

13 July 2013
14:00

Tanzania	0–1	Uganda

Referee: Nkurunziza (Burundi)
27 July 2013
15:00

Uganda	3–1	Tanzania

Referee: Kanoso (Madagascar)

== Southern Zone ==
=== Preliminary round ===
The two preliminary round winners qualify for the first round.
Angola, Botswana, Namibia, Swaziland, Zambia and Zimbabwe receive a bye and advance directly to the first round.
Note: Mozambique was not included in the initial draw published by CAF on June 9, 2012, and Seychelles was supposed to also receive a bye and advance directly to the first round, but then Mozambique was included to play a preliminary round against Seychelles, the qualifier taking the spot in the first round which was firstly drawn for Seychelles (vs. Namibia).

Team 1	Agg.	Team 2	1st leg	2nd leg
Mauritius	2–0	Comoros	2–0	0–0
Mozambique	6–1	Seychelles	4–0	2–1

1 December 2012

Mauritius	2–0	Comoros
Calambé 60'; Pithia 70'	Report

George V Stadium, Curepipe
Referee: Kanoso (Madagascar)
15 December 2012

Comoros	0–0	Mauritius

Stade Said Mohamed Cheikh, Mitsamiouli
Referee: Chirinda (Mozambique)

2 December 2012

Mozambique	4–0	Seychelles
Diogo 33', 46'; Kito 53'; Lanito 72'	Report

Estádio do Zimpeto, Maputo
Referee: Gomes (South Africa)
15 December 2012

Seychelles	1–2	Mozambique
Nibourette 63'		Reginaldo 52'; Mário 62'

Stade Linité, Victoria
Referee: Chutooree (Mauritius)

=== First round ===
The 4 winners of the first round qualify for the second round.

Team 1	Agg.	Team 2	1st leg	2nd leg
Mauritius	1–4	Zimbabwe	0–3	1–1
Mozambique	3–3 (5–4p)	Namibia	3–0	0–3
Swaziland (Eswatini)	0–2	Angola	0–1	0–1
Botswana	1–3	Zambia	1–1	0–2

28 July 2013
TBA

Mauritius	0–3	Zimbabwe
	Report	Mazivisa 15', 90'; Sithole 58'

George V Stadium, Curepipe
Referee: Fred (Seychelles)
4 August 2013
14:00

Zimbabwe	1–1	Mauritius
Mambare 84'	Report	Calambé 90'

Rufaro Stadium, Harare
Referee: Chirinda (Mozambique)

28 July 2013
15:00

Mozambique	3–0	Namibia
Miró 30' (pen.); Khan 63'; Mário 72'	Report

Estádio da Machava, Matola
Referee: Hachiwa (Zambia)
3 August 2013
TBA

Namibia	3–0	Mozambique
Cloete 51'; Katjiteo 85', 90+2'	Report
Penalties
	4–5

Sam Nujoma Stadium, Windhoek
Referee: Bondo (Botswana)

23 June 2013
15:00

Swaziland	0–1	Angola
		Job 21'

Somhlolo National Stadium
Referee: Madila (DR Congo)
29 June 2013
17:00

Angola	1–0	Swaziland
Manuel 17'

Luanda
Referee: Adelaid (Comoros)

27 July 2013
TBA

Botswana	1–1	Zambia

Referee: Shikongo (Namibia)
3 August 2013
TBA

Zambia	2–0	Botswana

Referee: Nhleko (Swaziland)

=== Second round ===
The two winners of the second round qualify for the final tournament, along with hosts South Africa.

Team 1	Agg.	Team 2	1st leg	2nd leg
Zimbabwe	1–0	Zambia	0–0	1–0
Mozambique	1–1 (a)	Angola	0–0	1–1

18 August 2013
TBA

Zimbabwe	0–0	Zambia

Referee: Aurelien Juankou Wandji (Cameroon)
24 August 2013
TBA

Zambia	0–1	Zimbabwe

Referee: Anthony Raphael (Malawi)

25 August 2013
TBA

Mozambique	0–0	Angola

Referee: Norman Matemera (Zimbabwe)
31 August 2013
TBA

Angola	1–1	Mozambique
Guedes 10'		Diogo 30'

Referee: Osiane Koto (Lesotho)

== Qualified teams ==
Team	Qualification
North Zone
Libya	Automatic
Morocco	Defeated Tunisia
Zone West A
Mauritania	Defeated Senegal
Mali	Defeated Guinea
Zone West B
Ghana	Automatic
Nigeria	Defeated Ivory Coast
Burkina Faso	Defeated Niger
Central Zone
Congo	Defeated DR Congo
Gabon	Defeated Cameroon
DR Congo	Defeated Cameroon
Central-East Zone
Burundi	Defeated Sudan
Ethiopia	Defeated Rwanda
Uganda	Defeated Tanzania
Southern Zone
South Africa	Hosts
Zimbabwe	Defeated Zambia
Mozambique	Defeated Angola
