= Abdallah Juma =

Kenyan weightlifter

Personal information
- Nationality: Kenyan
- Born: 21 July 1968 (age 57)

Sport
- Sport: Weightlifting

Abdallah Juma (born 21 July 1968) is a Kenyan weightlifter. He competed in the men's featherweight event at the 1992 Summer Olympics.
