= Saladin Bargicho =

Ethiopian footballer (born 1994)

Personal information
- Full name: Salahadin Bargicho
- Date of birth: 31 May 1994 (age 32)
- Place of birth: Addis Ababa, Ethiopia
- Height: 1.84 m (6 ft 1/2 in)
- Position: Defender

Senior career*
Years	Team	Apps	(Gls)
2012–2013	Ethiopian Insurance		
2013–2022	Saint George		

International career^{‡}
2013–	Ethiopia	25	(2)
- * Club domestic league appearances and goals ‡ National team caps and goals as of 31 May 2017

Saladin Bargicho (born 31 May 1994) is an Ethiopian professional footballer who plays as a defender.

== International career ==
In January 2014, coach Sewnet Bishaw, invited him to be a part of the Ethiopia squad for the 2014 African Nations Championship. The team was eliminated in the group stages after losing to Congo, Libya and Ghana.

=== International goals ===
Scores and results list Ethiopia's goal tally first.

No	Date	Venue	Opponent	Score	Result	Competition
1.	25 May 2013	Addis Ababa Stadium, Addis Ababa, Ethiopia	Sudan	1–0	2–0	Friendly
2.	30 November 2013	Nyayo National Stadium, Nairobi, Kenya	Zanzibar	2–0	3–1	2013 CECAFA Cup
