= Duncan Ochieng =

Kenyan footballer (born 1978)

Personal information
- Full name: Duncan Aketch Ochieng
- Date of birth: 31 August 1978 (age 48)
- Place of birth: Kenya
- Position: Goalkeeper

Team information
- Current team: Kenya (Goalkeeper coach)
- Number: 16

Senior career*
Years	Team	Apps	(Gls)
1994–2001	Mathare United		
2002	Mumias Sugar		
2003–2005	Mathare United		
2005–2006	Sông Lam Nghệ An		
2006–2007	Mathare United		
2007	IK Sleipner		
2008–2010	Mathare United		
2011	Tusker		
2012–2014	Sofapaka		
2014–	Tusker		

International career^{‡}
1997–2013	Kenya	43	(0)

Managerial career
- 2021-: Kenya (Goalkeeper coach)
- * Club domestic league appearances and goals as of 10 May 2014 ‡ National team caps and goals as of 12 December 2013

Duncan Aketch Ochieng (born 31 August 1978) is a Kenyan footballer who plays for Kenyan Premier League side Sofapaka as a goalkeeper. He spent the majority of his career at Mathare United, where he spent 16 years in 4 different stints. He also previously played for now defunct Mumias Sugar, V.League 1 side Sông Lam Nghệ An and Swedish Division 2 side IK Sleipner. He has also made several appearances for the Kenya national team, with whom he won the 2013 CECAFA Cup on home soil. He played the full 90 minutes in the final against Sudan, keeping a clean sheet to help his side to a 2–0 win and a 6th regional title.

During a 2013 FKF President's Cup semi-final on 20 October 2013, a shocking goalkeeping blunder by Ochieng allowed Allan Wanga of A.F.C. Leopards to seal a 2−0 win to take his side to the final. With Wanga sent through on goal by Mike Baraza, Ochieng rushed out to clear the danger, comically missing the ball and leaving Wanga with an empty net to score in.

== Honours ==
=== Club ===
Mathare United

- Kenyan Premier League: 2008
- President's Cup: 1998, 2000

Tusker

- Kenyan Premier League: 2011

=== International ===
- CECAFA Cup: 2002, 2013
