= Lucas Indeche =

Kenyan footballer (born 1991)

Personal information
- Full name: Lucas Lucheri Indeche
- Date of birth: 12 February 1991 (age 35)
- Place of birth: Thika, Kenya
- Height: 1.80 m (5 ft 11 in)
- Position: Goalkeeper

Team information
- Current team: A.F.C. Leopards

Senior career*
Years	Team	Apps	(Gls)
2010–2013	Thika United		
2014–2015	SoNy Sugar		
2016–	A.F.C. Leopards		

International career^{‡}
2012–	Kenya	1	(0)
- * Club domestic league appearances and goals as of 19:34, 27 April 2017 (UTC) ‡ National team caps and goals as of 19:34, 27 April 2017 (UTC)

Lucas Lucheri Indeche (born 12 February 1991) is a Kenyan international footballer who plays for A.F.C. Leopards as a goalkeeper.

== Career ==
Born in Thika, Indeche has played club football for Thika United, SoNy Sugar and A.F.C. Leopards.

He made his international debut for Kenya in 2012.
