= Jimmy Eresto =

South Sudanese footballer

Personal information
- Full name: Jimmy Eresto Wani
- Date of birth: 10 February 1992 (age 34)
- Place of birth: Sudan
- Position: Defender

Team information
- Current team: Munuki FC

Senior career*
Years	Team	Apps	(Gls)
- Al-Malakia
- Munuki FC

International career^{‡}
2010	Sudan	0	(0)
2013–	South Sudan	3	(0)
- * Club domestic league appearances and goals as of 30 November 2013 ‡ National team caps and goals as of 30 November 2013

Jimmy Eresto is a South Sudanese footballer who plays as a defender. He made his senior debut for South Sudan national football team in the 2013 CECAFA Cup and won the man of the match award.
