= Al Mirghani ESC =

Sudanese football club

- Full name: Al Mirghani Educational Sport Club
- Ground: Stade Al-Merghani Kassala, Kassala, Sudan
- Capacity: 11,000
- Chairman: Razzag Abdelmonim
- Manager: Magde Moragan
- League: Sudan Premier League
- 2007: 11
Home colours

Al Mirghani Educational Sport Club (Arabic: نادي الميرغني للتربية الرياضية) is a Sudanese football club based in Kassala. Their home stadium is Stade Al-Merghani Kassala. They played in the second division of the Sudanese Premier League division 2.
