= Jacob Omondi =

Kenyan footballer

Personal information
- Date of birth: 23 October 1978 (age 48)
- Position: Striker

Senior career*
Years	Team	Apps	(Gls)
2002–2013	Sher Agencies / Karuturi		
2014	Finlays Horticulture		

International career
2001–2007	Kenya	10	(1)
- * Club domestic league appearances and goals

Jacob Omondi (born 23 October 1978) is a Kenyan former footballer who played as a striker.

== Career ==
Omondi played club football for Sher Agencies / Karuturi and Finlays Horticulture.

He earned 10 caps for the Kenyan national team, scoring once.
