= Malik Mohammed =

Sudanese footballer (born 1989)

Malik Muhamed
Personal information
- Full name: Malik Muhamed Ahmed Barma
- Date of birth: 13 April 1989 (age 37)
- Place of birth: Sudan
- Height: 1.77 m (5 ft 9 1/2 in)
- Position: Defender

Team information
- Current team: Wad Nobawi SC (Omdurman)
- Number: 5

Senior career*
Years	Team	Apps	(Gls)
2009-2012	Al-Ahli SC (Wad Madani)		
2013	Al-Merreikh SC (Al-Fasher)		
2013-2016	Al-Hilal Club		
2016	Al-Merrikh SC (Nyala)		
2017-2021	Al-Hilal SC (Kadougli)		
2021-	Wad Nobawi SC (Omdurman)		

International career^{‡}
2013–	Sudan	13	(0)
Medal record
Men's football
Representing Sudan
CECAFA Cup
Runner-up	2013 Kenya
- * Club domestic league appearances and goals ‡ National team caps and goals as of 01:24, 2 December 2014 (UTC)

Malik Muhamed (born 13 April 1989) is a Sudanese professional footballer who plays as a defender.

== Honours ==
Sudan

- CECAFA Cup: runner-up, 2013
