= Faris Abdalla =

Sudanese footballer

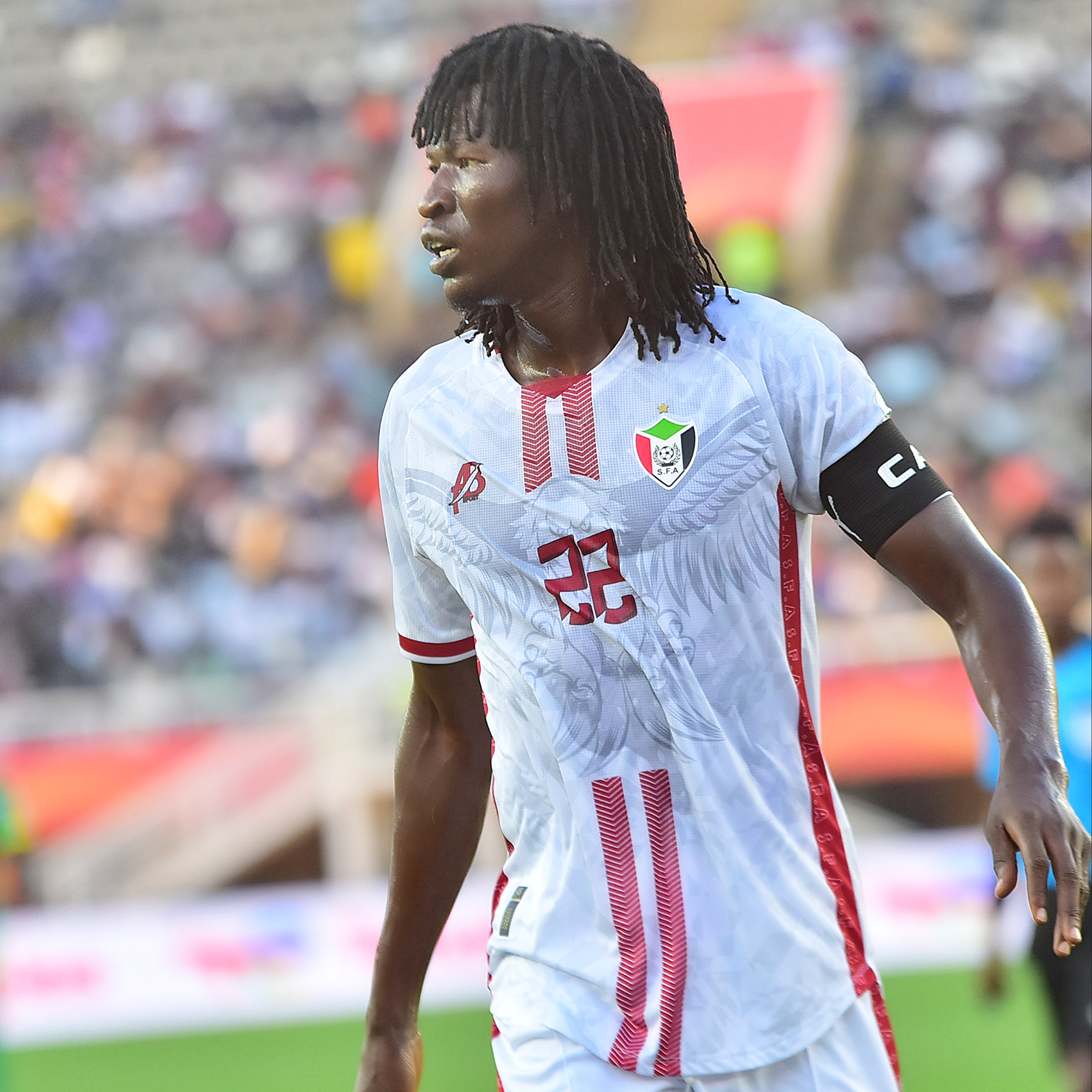

Personal information
- Full name: Faris Abdalla Mamoun Sawedy
- Date of birth: 19 February 1991 (age 35)
- Place of birth: Wau, Sudan
- Height: 1.75 m (5 ft 9 in)
- Position: Left back

Senior career*
Years	Team	Apps	(Gls)
2010	Al-Shoala SC (Bahri)		
2011–2018	Al-Ahly Shendi		
2018–2026	Al-Hilal SC		

International career^{‡}
2012–2025	Sudan	56	(1)

Managerial career
- 2026-: Al-Hilal SC assist
Medal record
Men's football
Representing Sudan
CECAFA Cup
Runner-up	2013 Kenya
- * Club domestic league appearances and goals as of 4 August 2026 ‡ National team caps and goals as of 10:49, 29 August 2025 (UTC+2)

Faris Abdalla Mamoun Sawedy (born 19 February 1991) is a Sudanese professional footballer who plays as a defender.

== Honours ==
Al-Ahly Shendi

- Sudan Cup: 2017

Al-Hilal Club

- Sudan Premier League :2020-21, 2021-22, 2023-24, 2024-25, 2025-26
- Sudan Cup: 2021-22, 2024-25

Sudan

- CECAFA Cup: runner-up, 2013

== Career statistics ==
=== International goals ===
#	Date	Venue	Opponent	Score	Result	Competition
1.	27 November 2015	Bahir Dar, Ethiopia	Djibouti	4–0	Won	2015 CECAFA Cup
