= Patrick Oboya =

Kenyan footballer (born 1987)

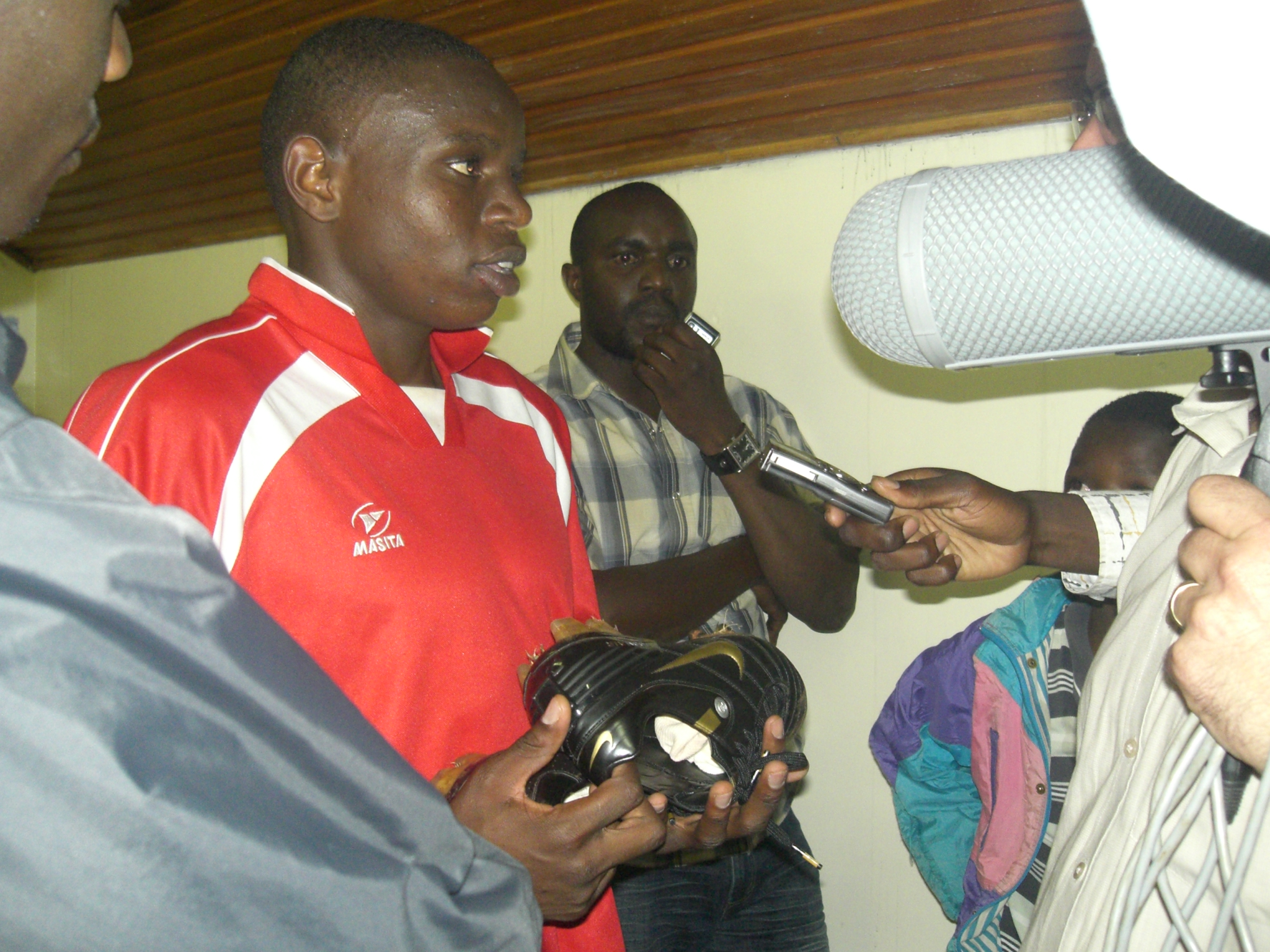
- Oboya at a press conference in Nairobi

Personal information
- Full name: Patrick Joseph Oboya Onyango
- Date of birth: 19 February 1987 (age 39)
- Place of birth: Mukuru kwa Njenga, Nairobi, Kenya
- Height: 1.76 m (5 ft 9 1/2 in)
- Position: Midfielder

Team information
- Current team: Tusker

Youth career
- Young Spiders
- Kamukunji High School

Senior career*
Years	Team	Apps	(Gls)
2005–2006	Leopards		
2006–2007	Tusker		
2007–2011	Baník Most	89	(9)
2011	→ Třinec (loan)	9	(1)
2012–2013	Ružomberok	10	(0)
2013	Becamex Binh Duong		
2013–2014	Gor Mahia		
2015	Tusker		
2016	Kakamega Homeboyz		

International career^{‡}
2007–2012	Kenya	29	(2)
- * Club domestic league appearances and goals as of 26 January 2015 ‡ National team caps and goals as of 14 November 2012

Patrick Joseph Oboya Onyango (born 19 February 1987), known as Patrick Oboya, is a former Kenyan footballer who played as a midfielder. He has also appeared for the Kenya national team, where he last played for the side in a friendly against Tanzania on 14 November 2012.

== Club career ==
=== Early career and Europe ===
Before moving abroad, Oboya played for two Kenyan Premier League clubs. He joined Leopards in September 2005 before transferring to Tusker in January 2006. In February 2007, he joined the Czech team Baník Most. After nearly four years in the Czech Republic, he moved to Slovak club Ružomberok on a three-year contract in January 2012

=== Gor Mahia ===
On 1 July 2013, it was announced that Kenyan Premier League side Gor Mahia signed Oboya the previous day after a successful medical. He made his debut for K'Ogalo on 17 July 2013, coming off the bench to replace Paul Kiongera in the 79th minute and help his side ensure a 2–0 league win over Chemelil Sugar at the Nyayo National Stadium.

=== Tusker ===
On 26 January 2015, it was announced that Oboya joined Tusker after spending a season and a half with Gor Mahia. He made his debut for the side in their first league game of the 2015 season on 21 February, playing out a 1–1 draw against Thika United at the Thika Municipal Stadium.

== International career ==
Oboya has made 29 appearances for the Kenya national team, the Harambee Stars, and scored two goals. He was the top scorer for Kenya in the qualifiers for Ghana 2008 with two goals.
