= Noah Wafula =

Kenyan footballer

Personal information
- Full name: Noah Wafula
- Date of birth: 16 January 1990 (age 36)
- Place of birth: Kenya
- Position: Forward

International career^{‡}
Years	Team	Apps	(Gls)
2014–	Kenya	1	(0)
- ‡ National team caps and goals as of 02:49, 2 December 2014 (UTC)

Noah Wafula (born 16 January 1990) is a Kenyan professional footballer who plays as a forward.
