= Muhannad El Tahir =

Sudanese footballer (born 1984)

Muhaned Altaher
Personal information
- Full name: Muhamed Altaher Osman
- Date of birth: 3 December 1984 (age 41)
- Place of birth: Kassala, Kassala State, Sudan
- Height: 1.88 m (6 ft 2 in)
- Position: Second striker

Senior career*
| Years | Team | Apps | (Gls) |
| 1999–2000 | Al-Nasr SC (Kassala) | | |
| 2001–2004 | Al Mirghani ESC | | |
| 2005–2014 | Al-Hilal Club | | |
| 2015–2021 | El-Hilal SC El-Obeid | | |
| 2021–2023 | Al Ahli SC (Khartoum) | | |
| 2023 | Tuti SC | | |

International career^{‡}
| 2004–2018 | Sudan | 90 | (15) |
Medal record
Men's football
Representing Sudan
African Nations Championship
| Third place | 2018 Morocco |
| Third place | 2011 Sudan |
CECAFA Cup
| Runner-up | 2013 Kenya |
| Third place | 2004 Ethiopia |
| Third place | 2011 Tanzania |
- * Club domestic league appearances and goals ‡ National team caps and goals as of 26 June 2024

Muhaned Altaher (Arabic: مهند الطاهر; born 3 December 1984) is a Sudanese footballer who plays as a secondary striker for Sudan Premier League club Tuti SC and the Sudan national team.

Altaher joined Kassala-based Al Mirghani ESC from city rivals Al-Nasr SC (Kassala) in 2004.

The fans call him Al-Ghezal, which means "the deer" in Arabic. He wears the number 10 shirt for Al-Hilal.

== Career statistics ==
Scores and results list Sudan's goal tally first, score column indicates score after each El Tahir goal.

List of international goals scored by Muhannad El Tahir
| No. | Date | Venue | Opponent | Score | Result | Competition |
|---|---|---|---|---|---|---|
| 1 | 21 December 2006 | Beirut, Lebanon | Somalia | | 6–1 | 2009 Arab Nations Cup qualification |
| 2 | 22 August 2007 | Khartoum, Sudan | Libya | | 1–0 | Friendly |
| 3 | 3 May 2008 | Omdurman, Sudan | Rwanda | | 4-0 | 2009 African Nations Championship qualification |
| 4 | 14 June 2008 | Khartoum, Sudan | Mali | | 3–2 | 2010 FIFA World Cup qualification |
| 5 | 11 October 2008 | Omdurman, Sudan | Congo | | 2–0 | 2010 FIFA World Cup qualification |
| 6 | 20 June 2010 | Omdurman, Sudan | Tunisia | | 2–6 | Friendly |
| 7 | 4 September 2010 | Omdurman, Sudan | Congo | | 2–0 | 2012 Africa Cup of Nations qualification |
| 8 | 11 January 2011 | Cairo, Egypt | DR Congo | | 1–2 | 2011 Nile Basin Tournament |
| 9 | 27 March 2011 | Omdurman, Sudan | Swaziland | | 3–0 | 2012 Africa Cup of Nations qualification |
| 10 | 11 November 2011 | Marrakesh, Morocco | Cameroon | | 1–3 | 2011 LG Cup (Morocco) |
| 11 | 28 November 2011 | Dar es Salaam, Tanzania | Ethiopia | | 1–1 | 2011 CECAFA Cup |
| 12 | 2 June 2012 | Khartoum, Sudan | Zambia | | 2–0 | 2014 FIFA World Cup qualification |
| 13 | 8 September 2012 | Khartoum, Sudan | Ethiopia | | 5–3 | 2013 Africa Cup of Nations qualification |
| 14 | 8 September 2012 | Khartoum, Sudan | Ethiopia | | 5–3 | 2013 Africa Cup of Nations qualification |
| 15 | 29 November 2013 | Machakos, Kenya | Eritrea | | 3–0 | 2013 CECAFA Cup |
| 16 | 29 March 2016 | Omdurman, Sudan | Ivory Coast | | 1–1 | 2017 Africa Cup of Nations qualification |

== Honours ==
Sudan

- African Nations Championship: 3rd place, 2018, 2011
- CECAFA Cup: runner-up, 2013; 3rd place, 2004, 2011
