= Bronson Chama =

Zambian footballer (born 1986)

Personal information
- Date of birth: 4 March 1986 (age 40)
- Place of birth: Zambia
- Position: Defender

International career
Years	Team	Apps	(Gls)
2013–2016	Zambia	21	(0)

Bronson Chama (born 4 March 1986) is a Zambian professional footballer who plays as a defender.
