= Michel Ndahinduka =

Rwandan footballer

Personal information
- Date of birth: 3 March 1990 (age 36)
- Place of birth: Nyamata, Rwanda
- Height: 1.99 m (6 ft 6 in)
- Position: Forward

Team information
- Current team: Bugesera

Senior career*
Years	Team	Apps	(Gls)
2012–2013	Bugesera		
2013–2016	APR FC		
2016–2018	Kigali		
2018–	Bugesera		

International career^{‡}
2013–	Rwanda	16	(4)
- * Club domestic league appearances and goals as of 2020 ‡ National team caps and goals as of 2020

He is now retired due to injury

Michel Ndahinduka (born 3 March 1990) is a Rwandan professional footballer who plays as a forward. he has also been a regular in the national team since 2013. The 24-year-old Ndahinduka holds the record of being the first ever player to be named in the senior national team (Amavubi stars) from a second tier league side.

== International career ==
=== International goals ===
Scores and results list Rwanda's goal tally first.

Goal	Date	Venue	Opponent	Score	Result	Competition
1.	27 July 2013	Stade Régional Nyamirambo, Kigali, Rwanda	Ethiopia	1–0	1–0	2014 African Nations Championship qualification
2.	5 December 2013	Kenyatta Stadium, Machakos, Kenya	Eritrea	1–0	1–0	2013 CECAFA Cup
3.	5 March 2014	Prince Louis Rwagasore Stadium, Bujumbura, Burundi	Burundi	1–0	1–1	Friendly
4.	2 August 2014	Stade Régional Nyamirambo, Kigali, Rwanda	Congo	1–0	2–0	2015 Africa Cup of Nations qualification
