= Fabiano Lako =

South Sudanese footballer

Personal information
- Full name: Fabiano Elias Lako
- Place of birth: Sudan
- Position: Midfielder

International career^{‡}
Years	Team	Apps	(Gls)
2013–	South Sudan	1	(1)
- ‡ National team caps and goals as of 30 November 2013

Fabiano Lako is a South Sudanese footballer who plays as a midfielder. He made his senior debut for South Sudan national football team in the 2013 CECAFA Cup.
