= Felix Katongo =

Zambian footballer (born 1984)

Personal information
- Date of birth: 18 April 1984 (age 42)
- Place of birth: Mufulira, Zambia
- Position: Midfielder

Senior career*
Years	Team	Apps	(Gls)
2000	Butondo Western Tigers		
2001–2002	Forest Rangers		
2003–2005	Green Buffaloes	38	(22)
2005–2006	Jomo Cosmos	15	(1)
2006	Green Buffaloes	22	(3)
2006–2007	Petro Atlético		
2007–2008	Rennes B	10	(2)
2008–2009	Châteauroux	5	(0)
2009–2010	Mamelodi Sundowns	9	(1)
2010–2011	Al-Ittihad Tripoli		
2011	Green Buffaloes		
2012–2013	Petro Atlético		
2013–2014	Green Buffaloes		
2014–2016	Al-Ittihad Alexandria	6	(2)
2016–2017	Green Buffaloes		

International career^{‡}
2004–2016	Zambia	68	(5)
- * Club domestic league appearances and goals as of 13:25, 6 May 2020 (UTC) ‡ National team caps and goals as of 13:25, 6 May 2020 (UTC)

Felix Katongo (born 18 April 1984) is a Zambian former professional footballer who played as a midfielder. Between 2004 and 2016, he made 68 FIFA-official appearances scoring 5 goals for the Zambia national team. His older brother Christopher was also an international player.

== Club career ==
Born in Mufulira, Katongo has played club football in Zambia, South Africa, Angola, France and Libya for Butondo Western Tigers, Forest Rangers, Green Buffaloes, Jomo Cosmos, Petro Atlético, Rennes B, LB Châteauroux, Mamelodi Sundowns and Al-Ittihad. Katongo's career in Libya was cut short by the 2011 Libyan civil war, which saw the Zambian government sending a plane to rescue him. In June 2014, he moved to the Egyptian side Al Ittihad on a three-year deal.

== International career ==
Katongo made his international debut for Zambia in 2004, and he has appeared in FIFA World Cup qualifying matches.

In January 2012, he was selected to Zambia's 23-man squad for the 2012 Africa Cup of Nations. He was also called up to Zambia's 23-man squad for the 2013 Africa Cup of Nations.

=== International goals ===
Scores and results list Zambia's goal tally first.

No	Date	Venue	Opponent	Score	Result	Competition
1.	6 January 2008	Stade Olympique de Radès, Radès, Tunisia	Tunisia	1–0	2–1	Friendly
2.	6 January 2008	Stade Olympique de Radès, Radès, Tunisia	Tunisia	2–0	2–1	Friendly
3.	22 January 2008	Baba Yara Stadium, Kumasi, Ghana	Sudan	3–0	3–0	2008 Africa Cup of Nations
4.	10 September 2008	Konkola Stadium, Chililabombwe, Zambia	Togo	1–0	1–0	2010 FIFA World Cup qualification
5.	9 January 2010	Rand Stadium, Johannesburg, South Africa	South Korea	1–0	4–2	Friendly
