= Haruna Chanongo =

Tanzanian professional footballer

Personal information
- Full name: Haruna Chanongo
- Date of birth: 14 November 1991 (age 35)
- Place of birth: Stone Town, Tanzania
- Position: Midfielder

Team information
- Current team: Stand United (on loan from

International career^{‡}
Years	Team	Apps	(Gls)
2013–	Tanzania	16	(1)
- ‡ National team caps and goals as of 00:46, 2 December 2014 (UTC)

Haruna Chanongo (born 14 November 1991) is a Tanzanian professional footballer who plays as a midfielder.

== International career ==
=== International goals ===
Scores and results list Tanzania's goal tally first.

Goal	Date	Venue	Opponent	Score	Result	Competition
1.	1 December 2013	Nyayo National Stadium, Nairobi, Kenya	Somalia	1–0	1–0	2013 CECAFA Cup
