= Abdi Kassim =

Tanzanian footballer

Abdi Kassim Sadallah
Personal information
- Date of birth: 19 October 1984 (age 42)
- Place of birth: Zanzibar, Tanzania
- Height: 1.86 m (6 ft 1 in)
- Position: Midfielder

Senior career*
Years	Team	Apps	(Gls)
2002–2003	Mlandege		
2004–2006	Mtibwa Sugar F.C.	55	(7)
2007–2010	Young Africans S.C.	65	(29)
2011	Đồng Tâm Long An	26	(7)
2011–2012	Azam F.C.	25	(3)
2013	KMKM	14	(6)
2014	UiTM F.C.	8	(1)
2016–2018	Jang'ombe Boys		
2018–2019	Mawenzi Market		
2019–2020	KMKM		

International career
2002–2012	Tanzania	25	(4)
2005–2012	Zanzibar	14	(2)
- * Club domestic league appearances and goals

Abdi Kassim (born October 19, 1984 in Zanzibar) is a footballer from Tanzania.

== International career ==
Also known as BABI or sometime Ballack of unguja, Kassim was the first player to score a goal in Tanzania's new stadium in Dar es Salaam, the Benjamin Mkapa National Stadium, in a friendly match against Uganda to mark the official opening of the venue. The stadium was built by the Chinese Government in collaboration with the Tanzania government.

Kassim is noted for his long range shooting ability. He favours his left foot.

On 4 January 2011, Yanga and Tanzanian national team midfielder Abdi Kassim has signed a two-year contract with a Vietnamese club, Đồng Tâm Long An.
