= Salum Abubakar =

Tanzanian professional footballer

Personal information
- Full name: Salum Abubakar
- Date of birth: 26 August 1998 (age 28)
- Place of birth: Lindi, Mtwara, Tanzania
- Height: 1.65 m (5 ft 5 in)
- Position: Midfielder

Team information
- Current team: Young Africans

International career^{‡}
Years	Team	Apps	(Gls)
2012–	Tanzania	50	(19)
- ‡ National team caps and goals as of 23:20, 10 September 2022 (UTC)

Salum Abubakar Mwita(born 26 August 1998) is a Tanzanian professional footballer who plays as a midfielder for Tanzanian Premier League club Young Africans and the Tanzania national team. with fazzil tidalboss

== International career ==
=== International goals ===
Scores and results list Tanzania's goal tally first.

No.	Date	Venue	Opponent	Score	Result	Competition
1.	15 November 2019	National Stadium, Dar es Salaam, Tanzania	Equatorial Guinea	2–1	2–1	2021 Africa Cup of Nations qualification
