= Fiston Abdul Razak =

Burundian footballer

Personal information
- Full name: Fiston Abdul Razak
- Date of birth: 5 September 1993 (age 33)
- Place of birth: Bujumbura, Burundi
- Height: 1.75 m (5 ft 9 in)
- Position: Striker

Team information
- Current team: Al-Rustaq

Senior career*
Years	Team	Apps	(Gls)
2009–2012	LLB Académic FC		
2012	Rayon Sports		
2013	Diables Noirs		
2014–2015	Sofapaka	23	(13)
2015–2017	Mamelodi Sundowns	2	(0)
2016	→ Bloemfontein Celtic (loan)	15	(4)
2016–2017	→ Bloemfontein Celtic (loan)	16	(1)
2017	1º de Agosto		
2018	Al-Zawraa		(1)
2018–2019	JS Kabylie	21	(7)
2019–2020	ENPPI	10	(0)
2021	Young Africans	13	(3)
2021–2022	Olympique de Khouribga	7	(1)
2021–2022	→ RS Berkane (loan)	4	(0)
2022–2023	Sur SC	22	(4)
2023–2024	Sofapaka		
2024–	Al-Rustaq	10	(2)

International career^{‡}
2009–	Burundi	52	(19)
- * Club domestic league appearances and goals as of 09:15, 31 July 2024 (UTC) ‡ National team caps and goals as of 11:20, 14 February 2026 (UTC)

Fiston Abdul Razak (born 5 September 1993) is a Burundian professional footballer who plays as a striker for Al-Rustaq and for the Burundi national team. He is the all time top goalscorer for Burundi.

== Club career ==
Before joining JS Kabylie, Abdul Razak played successively for LLB Académic FC, Rayon Sports F.C., CSMD Diables Noirs, Sofapaka, Mamelodi Sundowns, Bloemfontein Celtic , 1º de Agosto and Al-Zawraa.

== International career ==
Abdul Razak was named in the Burundi national team squad to represent the nation at the 2014 African Nations Championship held in South Africa.

== Career statistics ==
=== International ===
Appearances and goals by national team and year
National team	Year	Apps	Goals
Burundi	2009	2	0
Burundi	2011	3	0
Burundi	2012	4	0
Burundi	2013	4	1
Burundi	2014	7	1
Burundi	2015	6	6
Burundi	2016	4	3
Burundi	2017	4	1
Burundi	2018	4	5
Burundi	2019	10	2
Burundi	2020	2	0
Burundi	2023	2	0
Burundi	2024	1	0
Total		53	19

Scores and results list Burundi's goal tally first, score column indicates score after each Razak goal.

List of international goals scored by Abdul Razak
No.	Date	Venue	Opponent	Score	Result	Competition	Ref.
1	28 November 2013	Kenyatta Stadium, Machakos, Kenya	Somalia	2–0	2–0	2013 CECAFA Cup	
2	18 January 2014	Peter Mokaba Stadium, Polokwane, South Africa	Mauritania	1–1	3–2	2014 African Nations Championship	
3	13 June 2015	Stade Léopold Sédar Senghor, Dakar, Senegal	Senegal	1–1	1–3	2017 Africa Cup of Nations qualification	
4	5 September 2015	Intwari Stadium, Bujumbura, Burundi	Niger	1–0	2–0	2017 Africa Cup of Nations qualification	
5	7 October 2015	Stade Linité, Victoria, Seychelles	Seychelles	1–0	1–0	2018 FIFA World Cup qualification	
6	13 October 2015	Intwari Stadium, Bujumbura, Burundi	Seychelles	1–0	2–0	2018 FIFA World Cup qualification	
7	13 October 2015	Intwari Stadium, Bujumbura, Burundi	Seychelles	2–0	2–0	2018 FIFA World Cup qualification	
8	15 November 2015	Stade des Martyrs, Kinshasa, DR Congo	DR Congo	2–2	2–2	2018 FIFA World Cup qualification	
9	26 March 2016	Intwari Stadium, Bujumbura, Burundi	Namibia	1–2	1–3	2017 Africa Cup of Nations qualification	
10	29 March 2016	Sam Nujoma Stadium, Windhoek, Namibia	Namibia	2–1	3–1	2017 Africa Cup of Nations qualification	
11	29 March 2016	Sam Nujoma Stadium, Windhoek, Namibia	Namibia	3–1	3–1	2017 Africa Cup of Nations qualification	
12	10 June 2017	Intwari Stadium, Bujumbura, Burundi	South Sudan	3–0	3–0	2019 Africa Cup of Nations qualification	
13	16 October 2018	Intwari Stadium, Bujumbura, Burundi	Mali	1–0	1–1	2019 Africa Cup of Nations qualification	
14	16 November 2018	Juba Stadium, Juba, South Sudan	South Sudan	1–1	5–2	2019 Africa Cup of Nations qualification	
15	16 November 2018	Juba Stadium, Juba, South Sudan	South Sudan	3–2	5–2	2019 Africa Cup of Nations qualification	
16	16 November 2018	Juba Stadium, Juba, South Sudan	South Sudan	4–2	5–2	2019 Africa Cup of Nations qualification	
17	16 November 2018	Juba Stadium, Juba, South Sudan	South Sudan	5–2	5–2	2019 Africa Cup of Nations qualification	
18	11 June 2019	Jassim bin Hamad Stadium, Al Rayyan, Qatar	Algeria	1–1	1–1	Friendly	
19	8 September 2019	Benjamin Mkapa Stadium, Dar es Salaam, Tanzania	Tanzania	1–1	1–1	2022 FIFA World Cup qualification	

== Honours ==
Mamelodi Sundowns

- Telkom Knockout: 2015

Al-Zawraa

- Iraqi Premier League: 2017–18

== See also ==
- List of top international men's football goalscorers by country
