= Khalid Aucho =

Ugandan footballer (born 1993)

- Aucho with Uganda in 2025

Personal information
- Date of birth: 8 August 1993 (age 33)
- Place of birth: Jinja, Uganda
- Height: 1.80 m (5 ft 11 in)
- Position: Defensive midfielder

Team information
- Current team: Sidama Coffee
- Number: 6

Senior career*
Years	Team	Apps	(Gls)
2009–2010	Jinja Municipal	34	(8)
2010–2012	Water		
2012–2013	Simba	18	(3)
2013–2014	Tusker	34	(4)
2015–2016	Gor Mahia	36	(4)
2016	Baroka	5	(0)
2017	Red Star Belgrade	0	(0)
2017	→ OFK Beograd	10	(0)
2017–2018	East Bengal		
2018–2019	Churchill Brothers	16	(2)
2019–2021	Makkasa	32	(2)
2021–2025	Young Africans	84	(3)
2025–2026	Singida Black Stars	15	(1)
2026–	Sidama Coffee		

International career
2013–2026	Uganda	78	(2)
- * Club domestic league appearances and goals as of 1 July 2026

Khalid Aucho (born 8 August 1993) is an Ugandan professional footballer who plays as a defensive midfielder for Ethiopian Premier League club Sidama Coffee.

Aucho has played football in various clubs, such as Jinja Municipal Council F.C. from 2009 to 2010, Water F.C from Uganda from 2010 to 2012, Simba FC from Uganda, Tusker from Kenya, Gor Mahia from Kenya, and Baroka from the South African Premier Soccer League.

He was a part of the Uganda national side that qualified for the Africa Cup of Nations for the first time in 38 years.

== Early life ==
Aucho was born in Jinja, Uganda. He attended Namagabi Primary School – Kayunga, St Thudus (O-level), Iganga Mixed School (A-level).

== Club career ==
=== Gor Mahia ===
Aucho played for Kenya Premier League side Gor Mahia from 2015 to May 2016. He joined GorMahia from Tusker and was unveiled on 8 January 2015 at Nyayo Stadium. He scored his first goal for GorMahia on 22 March 2015 in the 41st minute against Chemilli Sugars F.C. with GorMahia winning 3–1. Aucho played his last game for GorMahia on 25 May 2016 at Moi Stadium Kisumu against Sofapaka F.C., where he headed in the opener for the Kenyan champions in the sixth minute, with GorMahia finishing the first leg on top of the table having 29 points.

In July 2016, Aucho went on trial at Scottish Premiership side Aberdeen. The move to Aberdeen collapsed, however, after a transfer fee snag between the clubs. After unsuccessful trials in Scotland, Aucho was signed by Baroka F.C. from South Africa at a fee reported to be 200,000 Rands (approximately KSh1.6million).

=== Baroka ===
On 24 August 2016, Aucho was signed by Premier Soccer League side Baroka. He made his debut on 15 October 2016 in a Premier Soccer League match played at Cape Town Stadium at the 50th minute replacing Chauke Mfundhisii.

=== Serbia ===
In February 2017, in the last days of the winter transfer period, Aucho went to Red Star Belgrade following a recommendation by the Uganda national team coach Milutin Sredojević. Red Star immediately sent him to OFK Beograd on loan until the end of the season. Due to administrative problems with missing visa, Aucho formally signed a six-month deal with OFK Beograd. Next the club was relegated to the Serbian League Belgrade, Aucho trained with Red Star Belgrade for a period in 2017, after which he left the club in June same year.

=== India ===
Aucho joined East Bengal February for last few matches of the 2017–18 I-league and Indian Super Cup. He featured all the four matches of the club in 2018 Indian Super Cup. He was released after the competition.

In September 2018 he joined another Indian club in Churchill Brothers. He made his league debut for the club on 28 October 2018, playing all ninety minutes in a 0–0 away draw with Minerva Punjab. He scored his first league goal for the club on 9 December 2018 in a 4–1 home victory over Aizawl F.C. His goal, assisted by Israil Gurung, was scored in the 23rd minute and made the score 1–0 to Churchill Brothers.

=== Makkasa ===
In July 2019 Aucho joined Makkasa on a two-year contract. In his first season at the club he made 21 appearances scoring twice, in his second season he made 13 appearances.

=== Young Africans ===
Aucho moved to Tanzanian club Young Africans in August 2021.

=== Later career ===
After departing Young Africans, Aucho moved to Singida Black Stars on 18 August 2025 on a two-year contract. In February 2026, he was suspended by the club.

In August 2026, Aucho signed with Ethiopian Premier League side Sidama Coffee.

== International career ==
Aucho made his debut for the Uganda national team (the "Cranes") against Rwanda in a 1–0 victory at the 2013 CECAFA Cup. He scored his first international goal in a match against Sudan to give his side a 1–0 victory in the group stage of the same competition.

In June 2016, Aucho scored on an overhead kick from his own penalty box in a 2–1 away win over Botswana in a qualifying game for the 2017 Africa Cup of Nations.

Aucho was on the Uganda team that qualified for the Africa Cup of Nations for the first time in 38 years on 4 September 2016.

Aucho was called up by head coach Milutin Sredojević to the Uganda national football team for the 2017 Africa Cup of Nations. He missed the first game against Ghana on 17 January 2017 due to a suspension.

On December 7, 2025, he was selected by Paul Put for Uganda's squad to participate in the 2025 Africa Cup of Nations.

On 12 October 2026, Aucho announced his retirement from international football, earning 78 caps and captaining Uganda during his career as an international. His international retirement sparked speculation across the country that it could have been fueled by FUFA's naturalisation plan of having non-Ugandans play for the national team without building the talent of nationals.

== Career statistics ==
=== International ===
Appearances and goals by national team and year
National team	Year	Apps	Goals
Uganda	2013	4	1
Uganda	2014	8	0
Uganda	2015	6	0
Uganda	2016	10	1
Uganda	2017	5	0
Uganda	2018	6	0
Uganda	2019	9	0
Uganda	2020	2	0
Uganda	2021	5	0
Uganda	2022	2	0
Uganda	2023	8	0
Uganda	2024	6	0
Uganda	2025	7	0
Total		78	2

Scores and results list Uganda's goal tally first, score column indicates score after each Aucho goal.

List of international goals scored by Khalid Aucho
No.	Date	Venue	Opponent	Score	Result	Competition
1	5 December 2013	Afraha Stadium, Nakuru, Kenya	Sudan	1–0	1–0	2013 CECAFA Cup
2	4 June 2016	Francistown Stadium, Francistown, Botswana	Botswana	2–1	2–1	2017 Africa Cup of Nations qualification

== Honours ==
Gormahia

- Kenyan Premier League: 2015

Young Africans

- Tanzanian Premier League: 2021–22, 2022–23, 2023–24, 2024–25
- CRDB Bank Federation Cup: 2021–22,2022–23 ,2023–24, 2024–25

Singida Black Stars

- CECAFA Club Championship:2025
