= Festus Mbewe =

Zambian footballer (born 1988)

Personal information
- Full name: Festus Mbewe
- Date of birth: 1 June 1988 (age 38)
- Place of birth: Lusaka, Zambia
- Height: 1.90 m (6 ft 3 in)
- Position: Forward

Team information
- Current team: Nkana F.C.

Senior career*
Years	Team	Apps	(Gls)
2014	Lamontville Golden Arrows F.C.	11	(2)
2014–	Nkana F.C.		

International career^{‡}
2013–	Zambia	22	(7)
- * Club domestic league appearances and goals as of 00:38, 2 December 2014 (UTC) ‡ National team caps and goals as of 1:05, 26 December 2018 (UTC)

Festus Mbewe (born 1 June 1988) is a Zambian professional footballer who currently plays as a forward for Nkana F.C.
