= Fasika Asfaw =

Ethiopian professional footballer

Personal information
- Date of birth: 27 April 1986 (age 40)
- Place of birth: Addis Abeba, Ethiopia
- Position: Midfielder

Team information
- Current team: Saint-George SA

Fasika Asfaw is an Ethiopian professional footballer who plays as a midfielder for Saint George SC.

== International career ==
In January 2014, coach Sewnet Bishaw invited him to be a part of the Ethiopia squad for the 2014 African Nations Championship. The team was eliminated in the group stage after losing to Congo, Libya, and Ghana.
