= Rodrick Kabwe =

Zambian footballer (born 1992)

Personal information
- Full name: Rodrick Kabwe
- Date of birth: 30 November 1992 (age 33)
- Place of birth: Ndola, Zambia
- Height: 1.80 m (5 ft 11 in)
- Position: Midfielder

Team information
- Current team: Zakho

Senior career*
Years	Team	Apps	(Gls)
- Forest Rangers
2011–2014	Kabwe Warriors		
2014–2017	Zanaco		
2017–2020	Ajax Cape Town	73	(10)
2020–2021	Black Leopards	21	(5)
2021–2022	Zanaco		
2022–2023	Sekhukhune United	28	(1)
2023–	Zakho		

International career^{‡}
2012–	Zambia	48	(0)
- * Club domestic league appearances and goals as of 20 March 2024 ‡ National team caps and goals as of 20 March 2024

Rodrick Kabwe (born 30 November 1992) is a Zambian professional footballer who plays as a midfielder for South African Premier Division club Sekhukhune United and the Zambia national football team.

== Career ==
=== Club ===
Kabwe began his career in Zambia with Kabwe Warriors in 2011, before subsequently moving to fellow Zambian Premier League team Zanaco three years later. During his time with Zanaco, he won the 2016 Zambian Premier League. On 22 December 2016, Kabwe signed for South African Premier Soccer League club Ajax Cape Town. He officially completed the move in January 2017.

He was released by Sekhukhune United in the summer of 2023. He went on to Iraqi club Zakho SC.

== Career statistics ==
=== Club ===
As of 23 December 2016.

Club statistics
Club	Season	League			Cup (Note: Includes the Nedbank Cup.)		League Cup (Note: Includes the Telkom Knockout.)		Continental		Other (Note: Includes the MTN 8)		Total	
Club	Season	Division	Apps	Goals	Apps	Goals	Apps	Goals	Apps	Goals	Apps	Goals	Apps	Goals
Ajax Cape Town	2016–17	Premier Soccer League	0	0	0	0	0	0	—		0	0	0	0
Ajax Cape Town	Total		0	0	0	0	0	0	—		0	0	0	0
Career total			0	0	0	0	0	0	—		0	0	0	0

== Honours ==
=== Club ===
Zanaco

- Zambian Premier League (1): 2016
