= Salah Al-Jezoli =

Sudanese footballer (born 1985)

Salah Aljezoli
Personal information
- Full name: Salah Ebrahim Hasan Aljezoli
- Date of birth: 14 September 1985 (age 41)
- Place of birth: Sudan
- Height: 1.82 m (6 ft 0 in)
- Position: Striker

Team information
- Current team: Hay Al-Arab SC (Omdurman)
- Number: 14

Senior career*
Years	Team	Apps	(Gls)
2010–2013	Al Khartoum SC		
2014–2016	Al-Hilal Club		
2017	Al-Hilal SC (Kadougli)		
2018	Hay Al-Arab SC		
2018–2020	Al-Mourada SC		
2020–2021	Al-Hilal SC Al-Managel		
2021–2023	Al-Defa Al-Jawi SC Jabl Awlia		
2023-	Hay Al-Arab SC (Omdurman)		

International career
2013–2016	Sudan	17	(8)
Medal record
Men's football
Representing Sudan
CECAFA Cup
Runner-up	2013 Kenya
- * Club domestic league appearances and goals

Salah Ebrahim Hassan Al-Jezoli (born 14 September 1985) is a Sudanese professional footballer who plays as a defender or midfielder. He played at the 2014 FIFA World Cup qualification.

== International goals ==
#	Date	Venue	Opponent	Score	Result	Competition
1.	15 June 2013	Ndola, Zambia	Zambia	1–1	1–1	2014 FIFA World Cup qualification
2.3.	29 November 2013	Machakos, Kenya	Eritrea	2–0	3–0	2013 CECAFA Cup
4.	2 December 2013	Machakos, Kenya	Rwanda	1–0	1–0	2013 CECAFA Cup
5.	8 December 2013	Machakos, Kenya	Ethiopia	1–0	2–0	2013 CECAFA Cup
6.	10 December 2013	Machakos, Kenya	Zambia	1–2	1–2	2013 CECAFA Cup
7.	15 October 2014	Abuja, Nigeria	Nigeria	1–1	1–3	2015 Africa Cup of Nations qualification
8.	15 November 2014	Durban, South Africa	South Africa	1–2	1–2	2015 Africa Cup of Nations qualification

== Honours ==
Sudan

- CECAFA Cup: runner-up, 2013
