= Bornwell Mwape =

Zambian footballer (born 1991)

Personal information
- Full name: Bornwell Mwape
- Date of birth: 30 September 1991 (age 35)
- Place of birth: Zambia
- Position: Forward

Team information
- Current team: AmaZulu F.C.

Senior career*
Years	Team	Apps	(Gls)
2014–	AmaZulu F.C.	8	(2)

International career^{‡}
2013–	Zambia	2	(0)
- * Club domestic league appearances and goals as of 00:33, 2 December 2014 (UTC) ‡ National team caps and goals as of 00:33, 2 December 2014 (UTC)

Bornwell Mwape (born 30 September 1991) is a Zambian professional footballer who currently plays as a forward for AmaZulu F.C.
