= Paul Kiongera =

Kenyan footballer (born 1988)

Personal information
- Full name: Kiongera Mungai Paul
- Date of birth: 10 November 1988 (age 37)
- Place of birth: Nairobi, Kenya
- Height: 1.88 m (6 ft 2 in)
- Position: Forward

Senior career*
Years	Team	Apps	(Gls)
2010–2012	KCB	32	(18)
2013–2014	→ Gor Mahia (loan)	21	(7)
2014	KCB	11	(5)
2015	Simba	9	(2)
2015	→ KCB (loan)	17	(11)
2016– 2017	A.F.C. Leopards	14	(4)
2018– 2019	Ushuru	15	(5)

International career^{‡}
2012–	Kenya	14	(5)
- * Club domestic league appearances and goals as of 15 October 2017 ‡ National team caps and goals as of 15 October 2017

Paul Kiongera Mungai (born 10 November 1988), called Modo by his peers, is a Kenyan professional footballer who plays as a forward for Ushuru and the Kenya national team.

== Club career ==
=== Early career ===
Kiongera began his career in the Kenyan Premier League, where he played for Kenya Commercial Bank SC from 2010 to 2012, before joining Gor Mahia. At Kenya Commercial Bank SC he managed to score 18 goals in 32 appearances, In 2012 season he scored his first hat trick of the season against Oserian Football Club. In the same year he scored the fastest goal in the league under 32 seconds against Posta Rangers Football Club at City Stadium.

=== Gor Mahia ===
After an impressive run at Kenya Commercial Bank SC, he got an offer to join Gor Mahia, one of the biggest clubs in Kenyan Premier League on a one-year loan deal. Under coach Zdravko Logarušić he managed to score 7 goals at the club, 4 in the league in 21 appearances, 2 in the CAF Champions League against Anse Réunion FC of Seychelles and one goal in the Charity Cup. He also won the Kenyan Premier League Trophy the same year with Gor Mahia. It is during this period that Borussia Mönchengladbach contacted the Kenya national team "Harambee Stars" head coach Adel Amrouche having an interest for the player for him to travel to Germany for trials, but he got injured prior to travelling.

=== Kenya Commercial Bank ===
Due to lack of playing time at Gor Mahia he terminated his contract returning to his parent Kenya Commercial Bank SC club where he scored 5 goals in 11 appearances, attracting Simba Sports Club Tanzania moneybags in Tanzanian Premier League.

=== Simba S.C ===
On signing with Simba Sports Club, he managed to play an international friendly against his former team Gor Mahia scoring 2 goals in the game. He was unlucky to get injured in the first Tanzanian Premier League game of the season and thus managed only 9 appearances and 2 starts, with 2 assists.

=== Kenya Commercial Bank ===
On recovering, Kiongera was loaned to his parent club Kenya Commercial Bank SC to gain match fitness and more playing time where he managed to score 11 goals in 17 appearances all in the second part of the season in the Kenyan Premier League. He also scored his second career hat trick against Thika United.

=== A.F.C Leopards ===
After his end of contract with 'Simba Sports Club, he joined the den A.F.C. Leopards. In his debut against Thika United he scored 1 goal and 3 assists, winning the Man of the Match award. He scored against Ulizi Star enabling A.F.C. Leopards to fight relegation, he also scored against Nakumatt Football Club and he was named Man Of The Match and also against Posta Rangers Football Club.

=== Ushuru F.C. ===
At Ushuru Football Club he has scored 5 goals in 15 appearances and 6 assists.

== International career ==
Kiongera has been capped 14 times playing for the Kenya national team "Harambee Stars" scoring 5 goals and 8 assists to goals. He was also part of the squad that won the 2013 CECAFA Cup on home soil.

== Career statistics ==
=== International ===
No	Date	Venue	Opponent	Score	Result	Competition
1.	12 July 2012	Nyayo National Stadium, Nairobi, Kenya	Botswana	1–0	3–1	International friendly
