= David Owino =

Kenyan footballer

Personal information
- Full name: David Owino Odhiambo
- Date of birth: 5 April 1988 (age 38)
- Place of birth: Nakuru, Kenya
- Height: 1.74 m (5 ft 8 1/2 in)
- Position: Defender

Team information
- Current team: Unattached
- Number: 15

Youth career
- St Joseph's Youth Nakuru: Sher Karuturi FC

Senior career*
Years	Team	Apps	(Gls)
2012–2014	Gor Mahia		
2014–	ZESCO United		

International career^{‡}
2012– 2021	Kenya	57	(2)
- * Club domestic league appearances and goals as of 8 May 2014 ‡ National team caps and goals as of 20 November 2019

David Owino Odhiambo (born 5 April 1988), nicknamed "Calabar", is a retiy Kenyan footballer who played for ZESCO United and NAPSA Stars F.C in the Zambian Premier League and the Kenya national team as a defender. He previously played for Sher Karuturi FC and Gor Mahia in the Kenyan Premier League.

== International career ==
=== International goals ===
Scores and results list Kenya's goal tally first.

No	Date	Venue	Opponent	Score	Result	Competition
1.	8 September 2013	Moi International Sports Centre, Nairobi, Kenya	Namibia	1–0	1–0	2014 FIFA World Cup qualification
2.	30 November 2013	Nyayo National Stadium, Nairobi, Kenya	South Sudan	3–1	3–1	2013 CECAFA Cup
