= Kelvin Yondan =

Tanzanian footballer

Kelvin Yondani
Personal information
- Full name: Kelvin Patrick Yondani
- Date of birth: 9 October 1980 (age 46)
- Place of birth: Mwanza, Tanzania
- Height: 1.74 m (5 ft 9 in)
- Position: Centre-back

Team information
- Current team: Geita Gold
- Number: 60

Senior career*
Years	Team	Apps	(Gls)
2000–2006	Mwanza United		
2006–2012	Simba SC		
2012–2020	Young Africans SC		
2020–2021	Polisi Tanzania		
2021–	Geita Gold		

International career^{‡}
2008–2021	Tanzania	97	(0)
- * Club domestic league appearances and goals ‡ National team caps and goals as of 19 December 2019

Kelvin Patrick Yondani (born 9 October 1989) is a Tanzanian football player who plays a defending position. He currently plays for Geita Gold.

Yondan is also a member of the Tanzania national football team.

== The team served ==
- Simba Sc 2008-2013
- Young African Sc 2013 until now
