= Hamis Kiiza =

Ugandan footballer (born 1990)

Personal information
- Full name: Hamis Kizza
- Date of birth: 10 October 1990 (age 36)
- Place of birth: Kampala, Uganda
- Height: 1.78 m (5 ft 10 in)
- Position: Striker

Team information
- Current team: Kagera Sugar
- Number: 10

Youth career
- 2006–2009: Proline FC

Senior career*
Years	Team	Apps	(Gls)
2006–2011	URA SC	88	(47)
2011–2015	Young Africans	80	(56)
2015–2016	Simba	30	(24)
2016	Free State Stars	6	(0)
2017	URA SC		
2017	El Hilal El Obeid		
2018	Fasil Kenema		
2019–	Vipers		

International career^{‡}
2011–	Uganda U23	8	(5)
2011–	Uganda	26	(11)
- * Club domestic league appearances and goals as of 27 January 2015 ‡ National team caps and goals as of 25 January 2015

Hamis "Diego" Kiiza (born 10 December 1990) is a Ugandan professional footballer who plays for Kagera Sugar FC in Tanzania premier league.

== Personal honours ==
- Ugandan Player of the year 2011 with URA FC
- Top scorer, Uganda premier league 2010/11with URA FC.
- Top Scorer, Young African FC-Tanzanian Vodacom Premier League 2011/12.
- CECAFA Club Winner and Top scorer with Young African FC 2012.
- Hamis Kiiza With Simba S.C – Tanzania Season 2015–2016 Played 30 MAtches 24 Goals ( 19 in League, 5 FA Cup ), top scorer in all competitions and second runner up top scorer in the Vodacom Premier League

== International career ==
Diego made his Cranes debut for Bobby Williamson in May 2011 when he was called up for the U23 side to face Tanzania in an All Africa Games Qualifier. He repaid the faith shown in him with 3 goals in 2 games against Tanzania and helped the team to the next round to face Kenya. After his impressive displays for the U23 side, he was promoted to the full National Team that will take on Guinea-Bissau in the crucial 2012 African Cup of Nations qualifier on 4 June 2011.

- CHAN Africa Championships in Sudna 2011
- African Cup Qualifiers since 2011 (Senior Team)
- Senior National Team Member since 2011
- U23 National Team All Africa games 2011 (Mozambique)
- U23 National Team Olympics Qualifiers 2011
