= Dan Sserunkuma =

Ugandan footballer (born 1983)

Daniel Sserunkuma
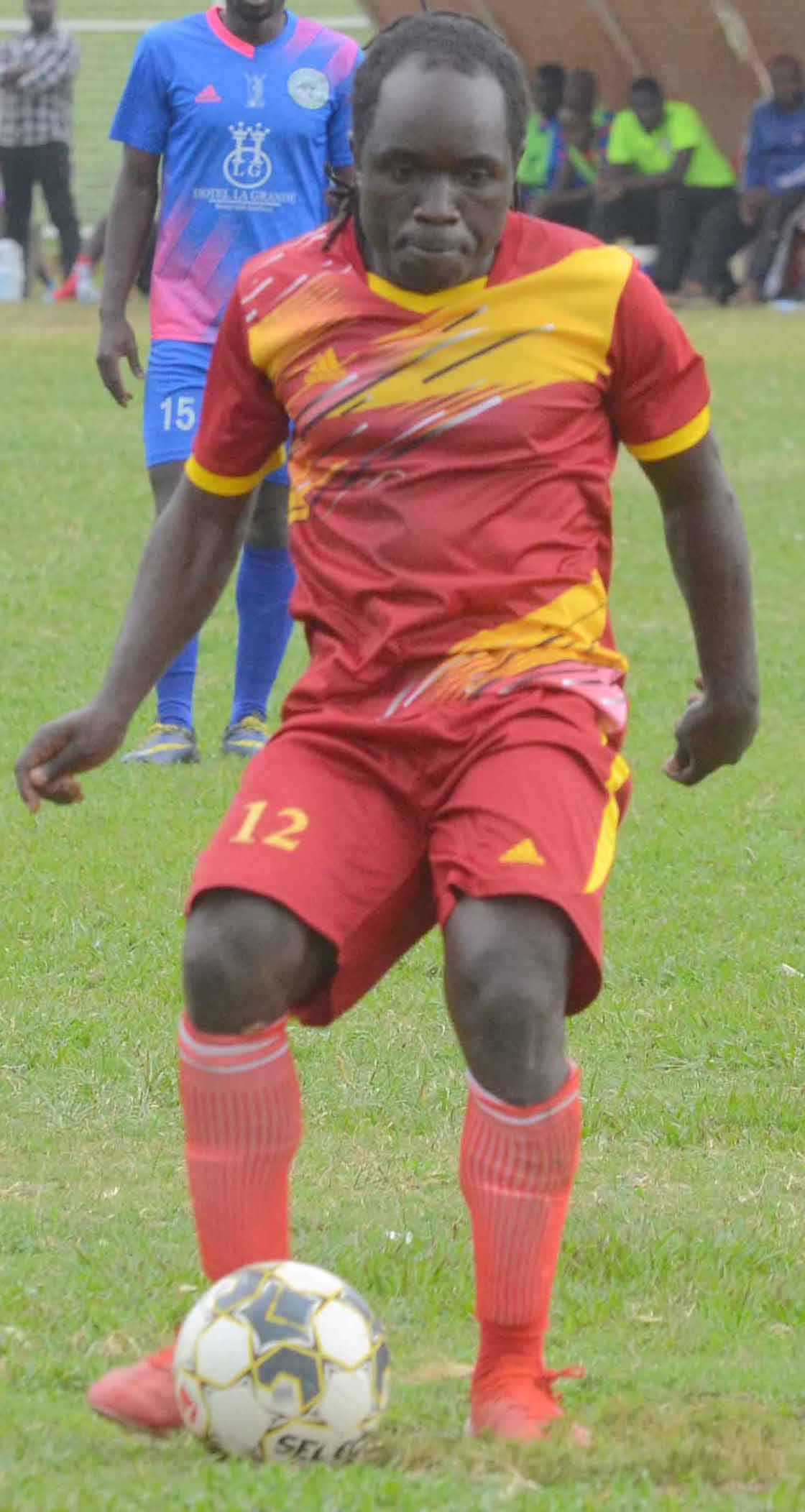
- 2022, by Samson Ssemakadde

Personal information
- Full name: Daniel Sserunkuma
- Date of birth: 14 December 1983 (age 42) (Note: Sserunkuma's date of birth is listed as 4 December 1993 (age 32) on his FIFA profile, while other sources list his date of birth as 14 December 1983 (age 42).)
- Place of birth: Kampala, Uganda
- Height: 1.70 m (5 ft 7 in)
- Positions: Midfielder; striker

Team information
- Current team: Vipers
- Number: 9

Senior career*
| Years | Team | Apps | (Gls) |
| 2008–2010 | Express | 18 | (10) |
| 2010–2011 | Victors | 7 | (4) |
| 2011–2012 | Nairobi City Stars | 30 | (12) |
| 2012–2014 | Gor Mahia | 73 | (49) |
| 2014–2015 | Simba | 12 | (6) |
| 2015–2016 | Ulisses | 12 | (7) |
| 2016–2017 | Bandari | 34 | (22) |
| 2017– | Express | 15 | (10) |
| 2018–2019 | Vipers | 32 | (23) |

International career^{‡}
| 2009–2010 | Uganda U-17 | 5 | (4) |
| 2010–2013 | Uganda U-20 | 7 | (4) |
| 2010–2013 | Uganda | 15 | (4) |
- * Club domestic league appearances and goals as of 12 January 2016 ‡ National team caps and goals as of 2 November 2020

Daniel Sserunkuma aka Muzeeyi (born 14 December 1993 in Kampala) is an Ugandan footballer who currently plays as a striker for Vipers SC and the Uganda national team, “Uganda Cranes".

== Early life ==
Sserunkuma was born and grew up in the Lubaga division of Kampala district. He attended St. Mary's School in Kitende which has also produced Ugandan players such as David Obua, Eric Obua, Emmanuel Okwi and Ibrahim Juma.

He joined Friends of Football Academy in Uganda at the age of 10. Sserunkuma said he was inspired by Majid Musisi, who is regarded as the country's best footballer of all time.

== Club career ==
=== Express ===
Sserunkuma started playing professional football at Ugandan team Express F.C. in 2008.

=== Victors ===
After one year in Express F.C., he moved to rival club Victors FC, where he stayed for the next two years.

=== Nairobi City Stars ===
In 2011, Sserunkuma moved to Kenya to join Premier League team Nairobi City Stars.

=== Gor Mahia ===
After playing for a year and half for Nairobi City Stars, Sserunkuma then moved to Gor Mahia F.C. in 2012.

In 2013, Sserunkuma played an important role in helping Gor Mahia F.C. clinch the Kenyan Premier League title for the first time in 18 years. He ended the 2012 season with 17 goals and several assists and was named the 2012 KPL player of the year. As Gor Mahia sought to win the national league for the first time in 18 years, it was Sserunkuma who played the pivotal role by scoring in almost all the last 10 games of the 2013 league. Thanks largely to Sserunkuma's goalscoring heroics, Gor Mahia won the league.

In November 2013, Sserunkuma caused a stir in the club by officially handing in a transfer request, expressing his desire to join Armenian Premier League club FC Banants. However, the player was not allowed to leave the club.

In 2014, he was the highest goal scorer in the 2014 Kenyan Premier League season with total of 16 goals scored.

=== Simba S.C. ===
In December 2014, Sserunkuma completed a free transfer to Tanzanian giants Simba. He terminated his contract with the club on mutual consent after just five months in the Tanzanian Premier League.

=== Ulisses ===
On 30 July 2015, it was announced that Sserunkuma joined Armenian side Ulisses on a two-year contract.

=== Express ===
In September 2017, Dan joined Express. Dan scored his first goal for Express against Maroons Football Club on 27 September 2017

=== Vipers S.C. ===
In January 2018, he joined Vipers SC where they formed fierce front three with Milton Karisa and Erisa Ssekisambu ending up winning the league. He also won the boot with 18goals.

- 2018/2019

Sserunkuma helped Vipers SC to finish second in the league scoring 13 goals in 21 matches in the absence of Karisa and Ssekisambu who were sold in the transfer window.

- 2019/2020

In this season Sserunkuma saw game time reduced when the club signed Fahad Bayo. He went on to score crucial goals and the team claimed the fourth League in their history.

== International career ==
In February 2013, Sserunkuma received his first national team call up for the Ugandan Cranes. During his debut match against Rwanda, he scored one goal from the penalty spot while setting up the other.

=== International goals ===
Scores and results list Uganda's goal tally first.

| # | Date | Venue | Opponent | Score | Result | Competition |
|---|---|---|---|---|---|---|
| 1. | 6 February 2013 | Amahoro Stadium, Kigali | Rwanda | 1–0 | 2–2 | Friendly |
| 2. | 19 November 2013 | Nyayo National Stadium, Nairobi | Rwanda | 1–0 | 1–0 | 2013 CECAFA Cup |
| 3. | 7 December 2013 | Mombasa Municipal Stadium, Mombasa | Tanzania | 2–2 | 2–2 (2–3 p) | 2013 CECAFA Cup |
| 4. | 4 June 2019 | Princess Magogo Stadium, KwaMashu | South Africa | 1–0 | 1–1 (2–4 p) | 2019 COSAFA Cup |

== Honours ==
Gor Mahia

- Kenyan Premier League: 2013, 2014
- FKL President's Cup Cup: 2012
- Kenyan Super Cup: 2013
- KPL Top 8 Cup: 2012

Simba

- Tanzanian Premier League: 2015

Bandari

- Kenyan Super Cup: 2016

Vipers

- Uganda Premier League: 2017–2018, 2019–2020
- Super 8: 2019

Individual

- Uganda Premier League Top scorer: 2017–2018
- New Player of the year in Kenya Premier League: 2011
- Player of the year in Kenya Premier League: 2012
- USPA Player of the year : 2013
- Topscorer in Kenya Premier League : 2014
