= Allan Wanga =

Kenyan footballer (born 1985)

Personal information
- Full name: Allan Wetende Wanga
- Date of birth: 26 November 1985 (age 40)
- Place of birth: Kisumu, Kenya
- Height: 1.86 m (6 ft 1 in)
- Position: Striker

Team information
- Current team: Kakamega Homeboyz (player & sporting director)

Youth career
- FIFA Kingdom
- St Paul's High School

Senior career*
Years	Team	Apps	(Gls)
2005–2006	Lolwe	– 12	(8)
2007	Tusker	23	(21)
2008–2010	Petro Atlético	35	(19)
2010	FK Baku	16	(10)
2011–2013	Hoàng Anh Gia Lai	22	(14)
2012	→ A.F.C. Leopards (loan)	– 14	(12)
2013–2014	A.F.C. Leopards	– 20	(17)
2014–2015	Al-Merreikh	18	(11)
2015–2016	Azam	19	(12)
2016–2017	Tusker	?	(?)
2018–	Kakamega Homeboyz	?	(?)

International career
2007–2015	Kenya	44	(22)
- * Club domestic league appearances and goals as of 17 July 2016

Allan Wetende Wanga (born 26 November 1985 in Kisumu) is a Kenyan footballer who currently plays for Kakamega Homeboyz in the Kenya Premier League as a striker, where he also is the sporting director. His dream of playing in the UEFA Europa League was not realised with Azerbaijan Premier League side FC Baku, as he failed to obtain a work permit after working out a 2-year contract with the club, which ended on 31 December 2009.

== Club career ==
=== Youth years ===
Allan Wanga started playing while at primary school. As a youth, he also played at various age levels for now defunct Kisumu based football club known as FIFA Kingdom.

He then went to St Paul's High School, Shikunga in Butere District and continued playing there, although the school did not have a famous football team.

=== Early career ===
In 2005, he joined Kisumu-based Lolwe FC, then playing in Nationwide League, the second-tier football league in Kenya. He only stayed three months though, because the Nationwide was being revamped and thus closed. He was set to join Agro-Chemical, but the move did not happen as he was threatened by Agro players fearing for their place in the team, according to Wanga. He then went home and was persuaded by his mother Noel, to join the army. He failed the army test, and got a chance at Sher Karuturi, another Kenyan top-flight club. After waiting for a contract offer, his brother Richard called him over a job offer in Canada, and Allan joined his brother in Nairobi but it did not materialise.

After almost a year without a club, Lowle contacted him in late 2006 and he returned, but was picked up by Premier League club Tusker F.C., in early 2007. He played for Tusker until the end of 2007 season, when his club won the league. He managed to score 13 goals in his nine last matches for Tusker FC and 21 in total.

=== Petro Atlético ===
At the end of 2007, he moved to Angolan club Petro Atlético, turning down trial offers from Swedish clubs. He won the Angolan Premier League (Girabola) in his first year, Petro Atléticos first league title since 2001.

=== FC Baku ===
At the end of January 2010, he moved to Azerbaijani club FC Baku on a six-month contract but renewable for a year. After winning the Azerbaijan Cup his optional year contract was not taken up by Baku, and Wanga went on trial with Georgian side Rustavi Olimpi. When the deal hit a snag he called on Baku who could not issue him a work permit until after four months.

=== Hoàng Anh Gia Lai ===
On 2 December 2010, he signed a contract with Hoàng Anh Gia Lai in the Vietnamese Super League.

In January 2013, Wanga joined Floribert Ndayisaba in going on trial with Omani side Al-Nasr.

==== Loan and return to A.F.C. Leopards ====
At the beginning of the 2012 Kenyan Premier League, Wanga signed a loan deal with A.F.C. Leopards until 11 November 2012. At the end of the season, Wanga sealed a permanent move to Ingwe.

=== Al-Merrikh ===
On 4 June 2014, Wanga agreed to a one-year contract with the Sudanese giants Al-Merrikh.

=== Azam ===
On 21 July 2015, Wanga agreed to a one-year contract with the Tanzanian club Azam FC. His first goal came in a Vodacom Premier League match against Stand United, During his one-year stay at Azam he was restricted to 11 appearances due to personal issues scoring 3 goals in the process.

=== Return to Tusker ===
In June 2016, Wanga completed a move back to his former side Tusker. On 17 July 2016, he played his first match back for the club in a 2–2 draw against Chemelil Sugar, coming on as a substitute for Michael Khamati in the 59th minute. He scored 4 minutes into injury time to put his side 2–1 up before having his goal cancelled out by Hillary Echesa a minute later.

== International career ==
He made his debut for Harambee Stars on 27 May 2007, in a friendly against Nigeria. His first international goal for Kenya came on 8 December 2007 against Tanzania in a 2–1 loss at the 2007 CECAFA Cup.

On July 8, 2019, Wanga announced that he had retired from International football.

== Personal life ==
Wanga's father, Frank Wetende, is a former A.F.C. Leopards and Kisumu Posta footballer who also played for the national team in the 1970s and early 1980s. His mother is named Noel Ayieta. He has three siblings, Richard Malaki, Nancy Kuboka and Magdalene Amboko, who is deceased.

His role models are fellow Kenyan footballer McDonald Mariga of Inter Milan and former French New York Red Bulls striker Thierry Henry.

Wanga married Brenda Mulinya, a Kenyan TV reporter on 3 September 2011.
