= 2025–26 Young Africans SC season =

2025-2026 Tanzanian football club season

Young Africans
2025–26 season
- President: Eng.Hersi Said
- Head Coach: Pedro Gonçalves
- Stadium: KMC Complex; Benjamin Mkapa Stadium (international Matches)
- NBC Premier League: 1th
- CRDB Bank Federation Cup: Round of 64
- Mapinduzi Cup: TBD
- Community Shield: Winners
- CAF Champions League: Group Stage
- Top goalscorer: League: Maxi Nzegeli; Andy Boyeli (2 each); All: Pacóme Zouzoua (4)
- Biggest win: 4–1 vs KMC (H); 9 November 2025 , Premier League
- Biggest defeat: 1–0 vs Silver Strikers (A), 18 October 2025, Champions League
- All statistics correct as of 9 November 2025.

The 2025–26 season will be the 90th season in the history of Young Africans and the 61st consecutive season in the Premier League. In addition to the domese, CRDB Bank Federation Cup, Muungano Cup and the CAF Champions League.

== Transfers ==
=== In ===
Date	Pos.	Player	From	Fee	Ref.
18 July 2025	MF	(Guinea) Balla Moussa Conté	(Tunisia) CS Sfaxien	Undisclosed	
22 July 2025	MF	(Tanzania) Offen Chikola	(Tanzania) Tabora United	Undisclosed	
23 July 2025	MF	(Tanzania) Abdulnasir Mohamed Casemiro	(Tanzania) Mlandege	Undisclosed	
25 July 2025	MF	(Mali) Lassine Kouma	(Mali) Stade Malien	Undisclosed	
27 July 2025	DF	(Tanzania) Abubakar Ninju	(Tanzania) JKU	Undisclosed	
31 July 2025	FW	(Democratic Republic of the Congo) Andy Boyeli	(South Africa) Sekhukhune United	Loan	
1 August 2025	FW	(Ivory Coast) Célestin Ecua	(Ivory Coast) Zoman FC	Undisclosed	
3 July 2025	FW	(Ivory Coast) Mohamed Doumbia	(Burkina Faso) Majestic	Undisclosed	
6 August 2025	DF	(Tanzania) Mohamed Zimbwe jr	(Tanzania) Simba	Free	
15 August 2025	MF	(Tanzania) Edmund John	(Tanzania) Singida Black stars	Undisclosed	
21 August 2025	DF	(Ghana) Frank Assinki	(Tanzania) Singida Black stars	Loan	

=== Out ===
Date	Pos.	Player	To	Fee	Ref.
24 May 2025	MF	(Burkina Faso) Stephane Aziz Ki	(Morocco) Wydad AC	Undisclosed	
30 July 2025	MF	(Uganda) Khalid Aucho	(Tanzania) Singida Black Stars	Free	
30 July 2025	MF	(Zambia) Clatous Chama	(Tanzania) Singida Black Stars	Free	
30 July 2025	MF	(Tanzania) Jonas Mkude	Free Agent	End of contract	
30 July 2025	FW	(Democratic Republic of the Congo) Jonathan Ikangalombo	Free Agent	Undisclosed	
30 July 2025	DF	(Tanzania) Nickson Kibabage	(Tanzania) Singida Black Stars	Undisclosed	
30 July 2025	FW	(Zambia) Kennedy Musonda	(Israel) Hapoel Ramat Gan	Free	

== Mwananchi Day ==
It is 7th festival and special day for the Yanga team to unveil and introduce its players, coaches, and the entire technical bench for the season. For the Season 2025/26 held on 12 September 2025.

12 September 2025 Mwananchi Day	Young Africans	1-0	Bandari	Dar es Salaam
20:40 UTC+3	Celéctin Ecua 2'	Report		Stadium: Benjamin Mkapa Stadium; Attendance: 60,000; Referee: Ramadhan Kayoko

== Players ==
=== Current squad ===
As of 12 September 2025

Note: Flags indicate national team as defined under FIFA eligibility rules; some limited exceptions apply. Players may hold more than one non-FIFA nationality.

No.	Pos.	Nation	Player
1	GK	TAN	Khomeny Abubakary
39	GK	MLI	Djigui Diarra
2	MF	TAN	Aziz Andabwile
23	DF	COD	Shedrak Boka
3	DF	TAN	Bakari Mwamnyeto (captain)
4	DF	TAN	Ibrahim Hamad
5	DF	TAN	Dickson Job (vice-captain)
33	DF	TAN	Israel Mwenda
36	DF	GHA	Frank Assinki
27	MF	TAN	Mudathir Yahya
7	MF	COD	Maxi Nzengeli
—	DF	TAN	Abubakar Ninju
15	DF	TAN	Mohamed Husseini
8	MF	MLI	Lassine Kouma

No.	Pos.	Nation	Player
9	FW	COD	Andey Boyeli
38	MF	KEN	Duke Abuya
31	FW	TAN	Offen Chikola
14	FW	TAN	Denis Nkane
22	MF	TAN	Sheikhan Ibrahim
24	FW	TAN	Clement Mzize
29	FW	ZIM	Prince Dube
12	FW	TAN	Faridi Mussa
20	DF	TAN	Kibwana Shomari
16	GK	TAN	Abuutwalib Mshery
6	MF	GUI	Balla Conte
11	FW	CHA	Celectin Ecua
19	MF	CIV	Mohamed Doumbia
26	MF	TAN	Edmund John
—	MF	TAN	Abdulnassir Casemiro
18	MF	TAN	Salum Abubakar

== Friendlies ==
15 August 2025 Friendly	Rayon Sports	1-3	Young Africans	Kigali
18:00 UTC+2	Aziz Andabwile 1' (Own Goal)	Report	Andy Boyeli 28'; Pacóme ZouZoua 45'; Bakari Mwamnyeto 90+3'	Stadium: Amahoro Stadium; Attendance: 30,000

23 August 2025 Friendly	Young Africans	2-1	Fountain Gate	Mwenge
16:00 UTC+3	Aziz Andabwile; Prince Dube		Camara	Stadium: KMC Complex; Attendance: Closed Door

29 August 2025 Friendly	Young Africans	4-0	Tabora United	Mwenge
16:00 UTC+3	Pacóme ZouaZoua 20'; Prince Dube 27'; Celéctin Ecua 68 ', 75'			Stadium: KMC Complex; Attendance: Closed Door

5 September 2025 Friendly	JKT Tanzania	1-2	Young Africans	Mbweni
16:00 UTC+3				Stadium: Mej.Gen.isamuhyo Stadium; Attendance: Closed Door

== Competitions ==
=== Overall ===
Competition	First match	Last match	Starting round	Final position	Record							
Competition	First match	Last match	Starting round	Final position	Pld	W	D	L	GF	GA	GD	Win %
NBC Premier League	24 September 2025	23 May 2026	Matchday 1	TBD	8	7	1	0	21	2	+19	87.50
CRDB Bank Federation Cup	TBD	27 May 2026	Round of 64	TBD	0	0	0	0	0	0	+0	—
CAF Champions League	19 September 2026	TBD	Qualifying rounds	TBD	8	4	2	2	9	2	+7	50.00
Muungano Cup	21 April 2026	26 April 2026	Semi-Final	TBD	0	0	0	0	0	0	+0	—
Community Shield	16 September 2025		Finals	Winners	1	1	0	0	1	0	+1	100.00
2026 Mapinduzi Cup	4 January 20226	13 January 2026	Group Stage	Winners	4	4	0	0	6	0	+6	100.00
Total					21	16	3	2	37	4	+33	76.19

=== Tanzanian Premier League ===
==== Results summary ====
Overall								Home						Away					
Pld	W	D	L	GF	GA	GD	Pts	W	D	L	GF	GA	GD	W	D	L	GF	GA	GD
7	6	1	0	11	1	+10	19	5	0	0	11	1	+10	1	1	0	0	0	0

==== Results by round ====
Round	1	2	3	4	5
Ground	H	A	H	H	H
Result	W	D	W	W	W
Position	4	2	4	1	5
Points	3	4	7	10	13

Updated to match(es) played on 30 December 2025. Source:
A = Away; H = Home; W = Win; D = Draw; L = Loss; P = Postponed

==== Score overview ====
Win Draw Loss

Opposition	Home score	Away score	Aggregate score	Double
Azam				
Coastal Union				
Dodoma Jiji				
Fountain Gate	2–0			
JKT Tanzania				
KMC	4–1			
Mashujaa	6–0			
Mbeya City		0–0		No
Mtibwa Sugar	2–0			
Namungo				
Pamba	3–0			
Prisons				
Simba				
Singida Black Stars				
Tabora United				

===== Matches =====
The league schedule was released on 29 August 2025

24 September 2025 Round 2	Young Africans	3–0	Pamba	Dar es Salaam
19:00 UTC+3	Lassine Kouma 45+4', (yellow card) 47'; Maxi Nzegeli 62'; Mudathir Yahya 90'	Report	Abdalla Sebo (yellow card) 32'	Stadium: Benjamin Mkapa Stadium; Referee: Abdi Wajihi

29 September 2025 Round 3	Mbeya City	0–0	Young Africans	mbeya
16:15 UTC+3		Report		Stadium: Sokoine Stadium

10 October 2025 Round 1	Young Africans	2–0	Mtibwa Sugar	Dar es Salaam
16:00 UTC+3	Zimbwe jr 39'; Ecua 83'	Report		Stadium: Benjamin Mkapa Stadium

TBC Round 4	Tanzania Prisons	v	Young Africans	mbeya
--:-- UTC+3				Stadium: Sokoine Stadium

9 November 2025 Round 5	Young Africans	4–1	KMC	Dar es Salaam
16:00 UTC+3	Maxi Nzegeli 37'; Pacóme Zouzoua 72'; Andy Boyeli 82' (pen.)	Report	Darueshi Saliboko 43'	Stadium: KMC Complex

4 December 2025 Round 10	Namungo	v	Young Africans	Lindi
19:00 UTC+3				Stadium: Majaliwa Stadium

10 December 2025 Round 6	Coastal Union	v	Young Africans	Tanga
19:00 UTC+3				Stadium: Mkwakwani Stadium

13 December 2025 Round 7	Young Africans	v	Simba	Dar es Salaam
17:00 UTC+3				Stadium: Benjamin Mkapa Stadium

18 February 2026 Round 8	Young Africans	v	Dodoma Jiji	Dar es Salaam
19:00 UTC+3				Stadium: Benjamin Mkapa Stadium

23 February 2026 Round 9	Singida Black Stars	v	Young Africans	Singida
16:15 UTC+3				Stadium: CCM Liti Stadium

26 February 2026 Round 11	Young Africans	v	Mashujaa	Dar es Salaam
19:00 UTC+3				Stadium: Benjamin Mkapa Stadium

1 March 2026 Round 12	Young Africans	v	Fountain Gate	Dar es Salaam
18:30 UTC+3				Stadium: Benjamin Mkapa Stadium

TBC Round 13	Azam	v	Young Africans	Dar es Salaam
TBC UTC+3				Stadium: Chamazi Stadium

TBC Round 14	Tabora United	v	Young Africans	Tabora
TBC UTC+3				Stadium: Ali Hassan Mwinyi Stadium

TBC Round 15	Young Africans	v	JKT Tanzania	Dar es Salaam
TBC UTC+3				Stadium: Benjamin Mkapa Stadium

TBV Round 16	Mtibwa Sugar	v	Young Africans	Morogoro
TBC UTC+3				Stadium: Jamhuri Stadium (Morogoro)

4 March 2026 Round 17	Pamba	v	Young Africans	Mwanza
16:15 UTC+3				Stadium: CCM Kirumba Stadium

TBC Round 18	Young Africans	v	Mbeya City	Dar es Salaam
TBC UTC+3				Stadium: Benjamin Mkapa Stadium

TBC Round 19	Young Africans	v	Tanzania Prisons	Dar es Salaam
TBC UTC+3				Stadium: Benjamin Mkapa Stadium

TBC Round 20	KMC	v	Young Africans	Dar es Salaam
TBC UTC+3				Stadium: KMC Complex

TBC Round 21	Young Africans	v	Coastal Union	Dar es Salaam
TBC UTC+3				Stadium: Benjamin Mkapa Stadium

4 April 2026 Round 22	Simba	v	Young Africans	TBC
TBC UTC+3				Stadium: TBC

TBC Round 23	Dodoma Jiji	v	Young Africans	Dodoma
TBC UTC+3				Stadium: Jamhuri Stadium (Dodoma)

TBC Round 24	Young Africans	v	Singida Black Stars	Dar es Salaam
TBC UTC+3				Stadium: Benjamin Mkapa Stadium

TBC Round 25	Young Africans	v	Namungo	Dar es Salaam
TBC UTC+3				Stadium: Benjamin Mkapa Stadium

TBC Round 26	Mashujaa FC	v	Young Africans	Kigoma
TBC UTC+3				Stadium: Lake Tanganyika Stadium

TBC Round 27	Fountain Gate	v	Young Africans	Manyara
TBC UTC+3				Stadium: Tanzanite Kwaraa

14 May 2026 Round 28	Young Africans	v	Azam	Dar es Salaam
16:00 UTC+3				Stadium: Benjamin Mkapa Stadium

20 May 2026 Round 29	Young Africans	v	Tabora United	Dar es Salaam
16:00 UTC+3				Stadium: Benjamin Mkapa Stadium

23 May 2026 Round 30	JKT Tanzania	v	Young Africans	Dar es Salaam
16:00 UTC+3				Stadium: Mej.Gen.isamuhyo Stadium

=== Community Shield ===
16 September 2025 Community Shield	Young Africans	1-0	Simba	Dar es Salaam
17:00 UTC+3	Shedrak Boka (yellow card) 32'; Pacóme Zouzoua 54'; Diarra (yellow card) 85'; Aziz Andambwile (yellow card) 90+11'	Report	Alassane Kante (yellow card) 54'; Kapombe (yellow card) 56'; Yusuph Kagoma (yellow card) 60'; Naby Camara (yellow card) 90+10'	Stadium: Benjamin Mkapa Stadium; Attendance: 60,000; Referee: Ahmed Arajiga

=== CAF Champions League ===
==== First round ====
The draw for the qualifying rounds was held on 9 August 2025, 10:00 GMT (13:00 local time, UTC+3), in Dar es Salaam, Tanzania.

19 September 2025 First leg	Wiliete	0-3	Young Africans	Luanda
16:00 UTC+1		Report	Aziz Andambwile 32'; Edmund John 72'; Duke Abuya (yellow card) 76'; Prince Dube 81'	Stadium: Estádio 11 de Novembro

27 September 2025 Second leg	Young Africans	2-0	Wiliete	Dar es Salaam
17:00 UTC+3	Pacóme Zouzoua 71'; Aziz Andabwile 87'	Report		Stadium: Benjamin Mkapa Stadium

==== Second round ====
18 October 2025 First leg	Silver Strikers	1-0	Young Africans	Lilongwe
16:00 UTC+2	76'	Report		Stadium: Bingu National Stadium

25 October 2025 Second leg	Young Africans	2-0	Silver Strikers	Dar es Salaam
17:00 UTC+3	Job 5'; Pacóme Zouzoua 33'; Zimbwe Jr (yellow card) 54'; Diarra (yellow card) 90+4'	Report		Stadium: Benjamin Mkapa Stadium

==== Group stage ====
The draw for the group stage was held on 3 November 2025, 12:00 GMT (14:00 local time, UTC+2), in Johannesburg, South Africa.

Pos	Team	Pld	W	D	L	GF	GA	GD	Pts	Qualification	AHL	ASFAR	YNG	JSK
1	(Egypt) Al Ahly	6	2	4	0	8	3	+5	10	Advance to knockout stage	—	0–0	2–0	4–1
2	(Morocco) AS FAR	6	2	3	1	3	2	+1	9	Advance to knockout stage	1–1	—	1–0	1–0
3	(Tanzania) Young Africans	6	2	2	2	5	4	+1	8		1–1	1–0	—	3–0
4	(Algeria) JS Kabylie	6	0	3	3	1	8	−7	3		0–0	0–0	0–0	—

Source: CAF

21–22 November 2025 Round 1	Young Africans (Tanzania)	v	(Morocco) AS FAR	Dar es Salaam
--:-- UTC+3				Stadium: Benjamin Mkapa Stadium

28–29 November 2025 Round 2	JS Kabylie (Algeria)	v	(Tanzania) Young Africans	Tizi Ouzou
--:-- UTC+1				Stadium: Hocine Aït Ahmed Stadium

23–24 January 2026 Round 3	Al Ahly (Egypt)	v	(Tanzania) Young Africans	Cairo
--:-- UTC+2				Stadium: Cairo International Stadium

30–31 January 2026 Round 4	Young Africans (Tanzania)	v	(Egypt) Al Ahly	Dar es Salaam
--:-- UTC+3				Stadium: Benjamin Mkapa Stadium

6–7 February 2026 Round 5	AS FAR (Morocco)	v	(Tanzania) Young Africans	Rabat
--:-- UTC+1				Stadium: Prince Moulay Abdellah Stadium

13–14 February 2026 Round 6	Young Africans (Tanzania)	v	(Algeria) JS Kabylie	Dar es Salaam
--:-- UTC+3				Stadium: Benjamin Mkapa Stadium

== Statistics ==
=== Squad statistics ===
As of 7 November 2025

No.	Pos	Nat	Player	Total		NBC Premier League		CAF Champions League		CRDB Bank Federation Cup		Muungano Cup		Community Shield	
No.	Pos	Nat	Player	Apps	Goals	Apps	Goals	Apps	Goals	Apps	Goals	Apps	Goals	Apps	Goals
Goalkeepers
1	GK	(Tanzania)	Khomeny Abubakary	0	0	0	0	0	0	0	0	0	0	0	0
16	GK	(Tanzania)	Abuib Mshery	0	0	0	0	0	0	0	0	0	0	0	0
39	GK	(Mali)	Djigui Diarra	9	0	4	0	4	0	0	0	0	0	1	0
Defenders
3	DF	(Tanzania)	Bakari Mwamnyeto	4	0	3	0	1	0	0	0	0	0	0	0
4	DF	(Tanzania)	Ibrahim Bacca	6	0	1	0	4	0	0	0	0	0	1	0
5	DF	(Tanzania)	Dickson Job	8	1	4	0	3	1	0	0	0	0	1	0
15	DF	(Tanzania)	Mohamed Zimbwe jr	6	1	3	1	1+1	0	0	0	0	0	0+1	0
20	DF	(Tanzania)	Kibwana Shomari	1	0	0	0	1	0	0	0	0	0	0	0
23	DF	(Democratic Republic of the Congo)	Shedrak Boka	7	0	1+2	0	3	0	0	0	0	0	1	0
33	DF	(Tanzania)	Israel Mwenda	8	0	4	0	3	0	0	0	0	0	1	0
36	DF	(Ghana)	Frank Assinki	0	0	0	0	0	0	0	0	0	0	0	0
37	DF	(Tanzania)	Abubakar Ninju	0	0	0	0	0	0	0	0	0	0	0	0
	DF	(Ivory Coast)	Kouassi Attohoula Yao	0	0	0	0	0	0	0	0	0	0	0	0
Midfielders
2	MF	(Tanzania)	Aziz Andambwile	8	2	1+2	0	3+1	2	0	0	0	0	1	0
6	MF	(Guinea)	Balla Conte	4	0	1+1	0	0+1	0	0	0	0	0	0+1	0
7	MF	(Democratic Republic of the Congo)	Maxi Nzegeli	9	2	4	2	3+1	0	0	0	0	0	1	0
8	MF	(Chad)	Lassine Kouma	4	1	1+2	1	0+1	0	0	0	0	0	0	0
10	MF	(Ivory Coast)	Pacòme ZouZoua	8	4	2+1	1	4	2	0	0	0	0	1	1
18	MF	(Tanzania)	Sure Boy	0	0	0	0	0	0	0	0	0	0	0	0
19	MF	(Ivory Coast)	Mohamed Doumbia	8	0	3+1	0	3	0	0	0	0	0	0+1	0
22	MF	(Tanzania)	Sheikhan Ibrahim	2	0	0+1	0	0+1	0	0	0	0	0	0	0
27	MF	(Tanzania)	Mudathir Yahya	5	1	0+1	1	3	0	0	0	0	0	1	0
38	MF	(Kenya)	Duke Abuya	8	0	3	0	3+1	0	0	0	0	0	1	0
35	MF	(Tanzania)	Abdulnasir Casemiro	0	0	0	0	0	0	0	0	0	0	0	0
Forwards
9	FW	(Democratic Republic of the Congo)	Andey Boyeli	7	2	2+2	2	1+2	0	0	0	0	0	0	0
11	FW	(Chad)	Cèlectin Ecua	6	1	1+2	1	0+2	0	0	0	0	0	0+1	0
12	FW	(Tanzania)	Faridi Mussa	0	0	0	0	0	0	0	0	0	0	0	0
14	FW	(Tanzania)	Denis Nkane	0	0	0	0	0	0	0	0	0	0	0	0
24	FW	(Tanzania)	Clement Mzize	2	0	0	0	1	0	0	0	0	0	0+1	0
26	FW	(Tanzania)	Edmund John	7	1	2+1	0	0+4	1	0	0	0	0	0	0
29	FW	(Zimbabwe)	Prince Dube	8	1	2+2	0	2+1	1	0	0	0	0	1	0
31	FW	(Tanzania)	Offen Chikola	4	0	2	0	0+2	0	0	0	0	0	0	0

=== Top Scorer ===
As of 9 November 2025

Rank	Player	NBC Premier	FA	CCL	Muungano	Community Shield	Total
1	(Ivory Coast) Pacóme ZouZoua	1	0	2	0	1	4
7	(Democratic Republic of the Congo) Maxi Nzegeli	2	0	0	0	0	2
2	(Tanzania) Aziz Andabwile	0	0	2	0	0	2
3	(Tanzania) Andy Boyeli	2	0	0	0	0	2
4	(Zimbabwe) Prince Dube	0	0	1	0	0	1
5	(Tanzania) Edmund John	0	0	1	0	0	1
6	(Chad) Lassine Kouma	1	0	0	0	0	1
8	(Tanzania) Mudathir Yahya	1	0	0	0	0	1
9	(Tanzania) Zimbwe	1	0	0	0	0	1
10	(Chad) Celéctin Ecúa	1	0	0	0	0	1
11	(Tanzania) Job	0	0	1	0	0	1
Total		9	0	7	0	1	17

=== Clean sheets ===
As of 9 November 2025

Rank	Player	NBC Premier	FA	CCL	Muungano	Community Shield	Total
1	(Mali) Djigui Diarra	3	0	3	0	1	7
Total		3	0	3	0	1	7

=== Assist ===
As of 9 November 2025

Rank	Player	NBC Premier	FA	CCL	Muungano	Total
1	(Democratic Republic of the Congo) Maxi Nzegeli	2	0	2	0	4
2	(Chad) Celéctin Ecua	1	0	1	0	2
3	(Ivory Coast) Pacóme Zouzoua	2	0	0	0	2
4	(Democratic Republic of the Congo) Edmund John	1	0	0	0	1
5	(Tanzania) Mohamed Zimbwe	1	0	0	0	1
6	(Tanzania) Offen Chikola	0	0	1	0	1
7	(Democratic Republic of the Congo) Andy Boyeli	0	0	1	0	1
8	(Ivory Coast) Mohamed Doumbia	0	0	1	0	1
9	(Kenya) Duke Abuya	1	0	0	0	1
10	(Tanzania) Israh Mwenda	1	0	0	0	1
Total		9	0	6	0	15

=== Goal Contributions ===
As of 9 November 2025

Rank	Player	Goal	Assist	Total
1	(Democratic Republic of the Congo) Maxi Nzegeli	2	5	7
2	(Ivory Coast) Pacóme Zouzoua	4	2	6
3	(Democratic Republic of the Congo) Andy Boyeli	2	1	3
4	(Tanzania) Aziz Andabwile	2	0	2
5	(Tanzania) Edmund John	1	1	2
Total		11	9	20

=== Disciplinary record ===
As of 19 September 2025

N	P	Nat.	Name	NBC Premier			FA			CCL			Muungano			Total			Notes
N	P	Nat.	Name	Yellow card	Second yellow card	Red card	Yellow card	Second yellow card	Red card	Yellow card	Second yellow card	Red card	Yellow card	Second yellow card	Red card	Yellow card	Second yellow card	Red card	Notes
38	MF	(Kenya)	Duke Abuya							1						1			
8	MF	(Mali)	Lassine Kouma	1												1			

Ordered by (red card) , (second yellow card) and (yellow card)
(yellow card) = Number of bookings; (second yellow card) = Number of sending offs after a second yellow card; (red card) = Number of sending offs by a direct red card.

== Player awards ==
=== Player of the Matchday ===
Month(s)	Competition(s)	Player(s)	Opponent(s)
September	Community Shield	(Ivory Coast) Pacóme Zouzoua	Simba
September	Premier League	(Democratic Republic of the Congo) Maxi Nzegeli	Pamba Jiji

=== Monthly awards ===
Month	Player of the Month	
Month	Fan's	Premier League
September		(Mali) Djigui Diarra
