= 2025 Tanzania Community Shield final =

2025 Tanzania Community Shield Final
Ngao ya Jamii
Young Africans	Simba
1	0
- Young Africans beat Simba 1-0
- Date: 16 September 2025
- Venue: Benjamin Mkapa Stadium, Dar es Salaam
- Man of the Match: Pacóme ZouZoua
- Referee: Ahmed Arajiga
- Attendance: 60,000

The 2025 Tanzania Community Shield final was the final match of the 2025Tanzania Community Shield, the 21st edition of the competition since its establishment in 2004, an annual association football match contested by the winners of the previous season's Tanzanian Premier League and the runner-up. It was played at Benjamin Mkapa Stadium in Dar es Salaam on 16 September 2025, It was the Kariakoo Derby meeting between Young Africans and Simba, which were the 2024–25 Tanzanian Premier League winners and runners-up.

Young Africans beat Simba 1–0 on regular time, winning their 9th Community Shield title.

== Background ==
This tournament includes four teams but due to the CHAN tournament, the organization decided to have two teams participate due to tight schedule.

== Match ==
16 September 2025
17:00 UTC

Young Africans	1–0	Simba
Pacóme Zouzoua 54'	Report

Benjamin Mkapa Stadium, Dar es Salaam
Attendance: 60,000
Referee: Ahmed Arajiga

GK	39	(Mali) Djigui Diarra	(yellow card) 85'
RB	33	(Tanzania) Israel Mwenda
CB	5	(Tanzania) Dickson Job(c)
CB	4	(Tanzania) Ibrahim Bacca
LB	23	(Democratic Republic of the Congo) Shedrak Boka	(yellow card) 32'	(substituted off) 64'
DM	2	(Tanzania) Azizi Andabwile	(yellow card) 90+11'
CM	27	(Tanzania) Mudathir Yahya		(substituted off) 46'
CM	38	(Tanzania) Duke Abuya		(substituted off) 74'
RW	7	(Democratic Republic of the Congo) Maxi Nzegeli (substituted off) 85'
LW	10	(Ivory Coast) Pacóme Zouzoua
CF	29	(Zimbabwe) Prince Dube (substituted off) 59'
Substitutes:
GK	16	(Tanzania) Abuutwalibu Mshery
DF	3	(Tanzania) Bakari Mwamnyeto
MF	35	(Tanzania) Abdulnasir Casemiro
DF	37	(Tanzania) Abubakar Ninju
MF	6	(Guinea) Balla Conte		(substituted on) 85'
MF	8	(Mali) Lassine Kouma
FW	24	(Tanzania) Clement Mzize		(substituted on) 59'
FW	9	(Democratic Republic of the Congo) Andy Boyeli
MF	19	(Ivory Coast) Mohamed Doumbia		(substituted on) 46'
DF	15	(Tanzania) Mohamed Zimbwe jr		(substituted on) 64'
FW	11	(Chad) Celéctin Ecua		(substituted on) 74'
Head Coach:
(France) Romain Folz

GK	26	(Guinea) Moussa Camara	(yellow card) 56'
LB	30	(Guinea) Naby Camara	(yellow card) 90+10'
CB	23	(South Africa) Rushine De Reuck
CB	14	(Tanzania) Abdulazack Hamza		(substituted off) 25'
RB	12	(Tanzania) Shomari Kapombe (c)	(yellow card) 56'
CM	8	(Senegal) Alassane Kante	(yellow card) 54'	(substituted off) 57'
CM	21	(Tanzania) Yusuph Kagoma	(yellow card) 60'
AM	10	(Ivory Coast) Jean Charles Ahoua
LW	34	(Democratic Republic of the Congo) Elie Mpanzu		(substituted off) 74'
RW	38	(Tanzania) Kibu Denis
CF	11	(Uganda) Steven Mukwala		(substituted off) 74'
Substitutes:
GK	22	(Tanzania) Yakoub Suleiman
DF	2	(Ivory Coast) Chamou Karaboue		(substituted on) 25'
MF	18	(Tanzania) Morice Abraham
MF	35	(South Africa) Neo Maema		(substituted on) 74'
MF	19	(Tanzania) Mzamiru Yassin
RW	7	(Zambia) Joshua Mutale
FW	40	(Tanzania) Selemani Mwalimu		(substituted on) 74'
MF	36	(Tanzania) Ladack Chasambi
DF	31	(Tanzania) Wilson Nangu
LB	5	(Tanzania) Anthony Mligo		(substituted on) 57'
Head Coach:
(South Africa) Fadlu Davids

Man of the Match:
Pacóme Zouzoua (Young Africans)

Assistant referees:
Mohamed Mkono
Kassimu Mpanga
Fourth official:
Ramadhan Kayoko

Match rules

- 90 minutes
- Penalty shoot-out if scores level
