= Mwenge (disambiguation) =

Mwenge is a county in Uganda.

Mwenge may also refer to:

- Mwenge, Dar es Salaam
- Mwenge bigere, Ugandan beverage
