= Salum Mayanga =

Tanzanian football coach

Personal information
- Date of birth: 24 April 1968 (age 58)
- Place of birth: Morogoro, Tanzania

Team information
- Current team: Mashujaa FC

Managerial career
- Years: Team
- 2016–2017: Mtibwa Sugar
- 2017–2018: Tanzania
- 2025–: Mashujaa FC

Salum Mayanga is a Tanzanian football coach.

In January 2017, he was announced manager of the Tanzania national team replacing Charles Boniface Mkwasa.
