= Nicolas Fontaine =

Nicolas Fontaine may refer to:

- Nicolas Fontaine (skier)
- Nicolas Fontaine (footballer)
