= Cyprian Kachwele =

Tanzanian footballer (born 2005)

Personal information
- Full name: Cyprian Thobias Kachwele
- Date of birth: 15 February 2005 (age 21)
- Place of birth: Shinyanga, Tanzania
- Height: 1.90 m (6 ft 3 in)
- Position: Forward

Team information
- Current team: Kryvbas Kryvyi Rih
- Number: 11

Youth career
- –2023: Azam

Senior career*
Years	Team	Apps	(Gls)
2023	Azam		(3)
2023–2026	Whitecaps FC 2	39	(11)
2024	→ Vancouver Whitecaps FC (loan)	1	(0)
2026	→ HFX Wanderers FC (loan)	15	(2)
2026–	Kryvbas Kryvyi Rih	0	(0)

International career^{‡}
2025	Tanzania U20	4	(0)
2024–	Tanzania	3	(1)
- * Club domestic league appearances and goals as of 29 August 2026 ‡ National team caps and goals as of 29 September 2026

Cyprian Thobias Kachwele (born 15 February 2005) is a Tanzanian professional footballer who plays for Ukrainian Premier League side Kryvbas Kryvyi Rih and the Tanzania national team.

== Early life ==
Kachwele played youth football with Azam. In 2022, he helped the U17 team win their league, while finishing as the league's leading scorer, while also winning the Golden Boot as top scorer in the 2022 U20 Cambiasso Rainbow Cup as Azam finished in second place behind only KCCA FC of Uganda.

== Club career ==
In 2023, Kachwele joined the Azam first team, toward the end of the season, scoring three goals in league matches. He also scored at least two goals for the club in the 2022–23 Tanzania FA Cup.

In August 2023, he signed with Whitecaps FC 2 in MLS Next Pro, despite interest from clubs in Europe. He arrived at the club in December 2023, following visa issues. Kachwele was an invitee to the Whitecaps first team for training camp in preparation for the 2024 Major League Soccer season. On 7 May 2024, he joined the first team on a short-term loan ahead of their 2024 Canadian Championship match against Cavalry FC, making his first team debut in the match. He signed another three short-term loans that season and made his Major League Soccer debut on 15 May against the Colorado Rapids. In December 2024, he re-signed with the team for the 2025 season.

In March 2026, he was loaned to Canadian Premier League side HFX Wanderers FC for the 2026 season. At the end of August, his loan was ended early as he agreed to a mutual termination of his contract with his parent club, Vancouver Whitecaps FC.

In September 2026, he joined Ukrainian Premier League side Kryvbas Kryvyi Rih.

== International career ==
In January 2024, Kachwele was called up to the Tanzania national team for the 2023 Africa Cup of Nations (held in 2024). He was then called up for the 2025 Africa Cup of Nations qualifiers in September 2024. He debuted on 10 September 2024 in an Africa Cup of Nations qualifier against Guinea.

== Career statistics ==
=== Club ===
As of 31 December 2025

Club	Season	League			Playoffs		Domestic Cup		Other		Total	
Club	Season	Division	Apps	Goals	Apps	Goals	Apps	Goals	Apps	Goals	Apps	Goals
Whitecaps FC 2	2024	MLS Next Pro	20	4	0	0	–		–		20	4
Whitecaps FC 2	2025	MLS Next Pro	19	7	–		–		–		19	7
Vancouver Whitecaps FC (loan)	2024	Major League Soccer	1	0	0	0	2	0	0	0	3	0
Career total			40	11	0	0	2	0	0	0	42	11

=== International ===
As of match played 29 September 2026

Appearances and goals by national team and year
National team	Year	Apps	Goals
Tanzania	2024	2	0
Tanzania	2026	1	1
Total		3	1

List of international goals scored by Cyprian Kachwele
No.	Date	Venue	Opponent	Score	Result	Competition
1	29 September 2026	Meknes Honor Stadium, Meknes, Morocco	Madagascar	1–0	1–1	2027 Africa Cup of Nations qualification
