= Abdalla Kheri =

Tanzanian footballer

Personal information
- Full name: Abdalla Salum Kheri
- Date of birth: 11 November 1996 (age 30)
- Place of birth: Zanzibar City, Tanzania
- Position: Centre back

Team information
- Current team: Azam
- Number: 25

Senior career*
Years	Team	Apps	(Gls)
20??–2014	Zimamoto		
2014–	Azam		
2016	→ Ndanda (loan)	1+	(0+)

International career^{‡}
2017–	Zanzibar	7	(0)
2018–	Tanzania	2	(0)
- * Club domestic league appearances and goals ‡ National team caps and goals as of 17 November 2020.

Abdalla Salum Kheri (born 11 November 1996) is a Tanzanian footballer who plays as a centre back for Premier League club Azam FC and the Tanzania national team.

== International career ==
Kheri represented Zanzibar (Note: Associate member of CAF but not member of FIFA.) and faced Tanzania at two CECAFA Cup editions (2017 and 2019). He made his senior debut for Tanzania on 18 November 2018 in an official match against Lesotho.
