= Abdihamid Moallin =

Somali football manager (born 1989)

Personal information
- Full name: Abdihamid Mohamed Moallin
- Date of birth: 9 June 1989 (age 37)

Managerial career
- Years: Team
- Columbus Crew
- 2021: Horseed
- 2021–2022: Azam
- 2023–2024: KMC
- 2024–2026: Yanga (assistant)
- 2026: Yanga
- 2026–: Mombasa United

Abdihamid Mohamed Moallin (born 9 June 1989) is a Somali football manager who manages Mombasa United.

== Career ==
Moallin worked as a youth manager of American side Columbus Crew. Following his stint there, he signed for Somali side Horseed. The same year, he was appointed manager of Tanzanian side Azam. While managing the club, he was regarded to have gained supporters in the Tanzanian Premier League.

During the summer of 2023, he was appointed manager of Tanzanian side KMC, helping the club achieve fifth place in the league. Subsequently, he was appointed technical director of Tanzanian side Yanga, where he worked alongside German manager Sead Ramović.

In 2026, he was appointed manager of Tanzanian side Yanga, helping the club win the league title. Ahead of the 2026–27 season, he was appointed manager of Kenyan side Mombasa United.

== Management style ==
Moallin has been nicknamed "Master Lecturer". Tanzanian news website Sportsleo Bongo wrote in 2026 that he "is recognized as a coach with broad technical expertise, who builds strong playing systems and elevates local coaches through modern football education".
