= Jenkins Alumona =

Nigerian Boxing Promoter

Jenkins Alumona is a Marketing communications practitioner, serial entrepreneur and boxing promoter. He is also the incumbent chairman of the Lagos State Boxing Association. He was previously a journalist, sport reporter and television presenter. He is a Fellow of the Advertising Regulatory Council of Nigeria and a member of the Nigeria Institute of Marketing (NIMARK) and also the vice president of the Association of Advertising Agencies of Nigeria.

== Education ==
Alumona attended Enugu State University of Science and Technology (formerly the Anambra state university of science and technology), where he obtained his first degree in mass communication, and also the University of Lagos, where he obtained a Master of Science in marketing.

== Career ==
=== Journalism ===
Alumona was a professional sports journalist at The Guardian newspaper, where he was assigned to cover boxing. He continued his sports reporting career at Independent Communication Network Limited (ICNL). He was appointed as an editor of The News and also co-hosted Master Sports (a television sport show) with Paul Bassey and Chris Eseka at the Nigerian Television Authority (NTA).

=== Boxing promotions ===
Alumona has been working to revive boxing as a sport and as a profession in Nigeria through his Flykite promotion. He is the brain behind the GOtv Boxing Night television show and is also the current chairman of the Lagos State Boxing Association.

=== Advertising ===
Until July 2024, Alumona was the Vice President of the Association of Advertising Agencies of Nigeria (AAAN), a position into which he was elected in 2020 and re-elected on 1 August 2022 along with other members of the Board. l. He is the managing director of Flykaite productions.
