= 2027 Africa Cup of Nations qualification Group L =

2027 AFCON qualifying group L

Group L of the 2027 Africa Cup of Nations qualification is one of twelve groups that will decide the teams which will qualify for the 2027 Africa Cup of Nations final tournament in Kenya, Tanzania and Uganda. The group consists of four teams: Nigeria, Madagascar, finals co-hosts Tanzania and Guinea-Bissau.

The teams will play against each other in a home-and-away round-robin format between September 2026 and March 2027.

== Standings ==
Pos	Team	Pld	W	D	L	GF	GA	GD	Pts	Qualification	(Guinea-Bissau)	(Nigeria)	(Madagascar)	(Tanzania)
1	Guinea-Bissau	4	3	1	0	8	1	+7	10	Final tournament	—	3–0	2–0	24 Mar
2	Nigeria	4	2	1	1	5	5	0	7		28 Mar	—	2–1	3–1
3	Madagascar (E)	4	0	2	2	3	6	−3	2		1–1	24 Mar	—	1–1
4	Tanzania (Note: Tanzania has already qualified for the final tournament as a host nation.) (Q)	4	0	2	2	2	6	−4	2	Final tournament	0–2	0–0	28 Mar	—

Updated to match(es) played on 17 November 2026. Source: CAF
Rules for classification: Tiebreakers
(E) Eliminated; (Q) Qualified for the phase indicated

== Matches ==
25 September 2026
16:00 UTC+3

Tanzania	0–2	Guinea-Bissau
	Report	Franculino 33'; Mam. Baldé 58'

Amaan Stadium, Zanzibar City
Referee: Brighton Chimene (Zimbabwe)
25 September 2026
17:00 UTC+1

Nigeria	2–1	Madagascar
Ilenikhena 45+1'; Usor 65'	Report	Kari 16'

Godswill Akpabio Stadium, Uyo
Referee: Alhadi Mahamat (Chad)

29 September 2026
14:00 UTC+1

Madagascar	1–1	Tanzania
N. Fontaine 50'	Report	Kachwele 39'

Meknes Honor Stadium, Meknes (Morocco)
Referee: Tanguy Mebiame (Gabon)
29 September 2026
16:00 UTC+0

Guinea-Bissau	3–0	Nigeria
Franculino 15'; Mam. Baldé 66'; Á. Djaló 90+5'	Report

24 September Stadium, Bissau
Referee: Tewodros Mitiku (Ethiopia)

12 November 2026
16:00 UTC+0

Madagascar	1–1	Guinea-Bissau
Caddy 59'	Report	Nhaga 84'

Meknes Honor Stadium, Meknes (Morocco)
Referee: Samuel Uwikunda (Rwanda)
13 November 2026
17:00 UTC+1

Nigeria	3–1	Tanzania
Yusuf 2'; Arokodare 52', 60'	Report	Msanga 32'

Godswill Akpabio Stadium, Uyo
Referee: Jean-Jacques Ndala (Congo DR)

17 November 2026
16:00 UTC+3

Tanzania	0–0	Nigeria
	Report

Amaan Stadium, Zanzibar City
Referee: Mohamed Athoumani (Comoros)
17 November 2026
17:00 UTC+0

Guinea-Bissau	2–0	Madagascar
Mam. Baldé 32'; Rodrigues 70'	Report

24 September Stadium, Bissau
Referee: Mohamed Diraneh (Djibouti)

24 March 2027

Guinea-Bissau	v	Tanzania
	Report

24 March 2027

Madagascar	v	Nigeria
	Report

28 March 2027

Nigeria	v	Guinea-Bissau
	Report

28 March 2027

Tanzania	v	Madagascar
	Report

== Goalscorers ==
There have been 18 goals scored in 8 matches, for an average of 2.25 goals per match (as of 17 November 2026).

3 goals

- (Guinea-Bissau) Mama Baldé

2 goals

- (Guinea-Bissau) Franculino Djú
- (Nigeria) Tolu Arokodare

1 goal

- (Guinea-Bissau) Álvaro Djaló
- (Guinea-Bissau) Renato Nhaga
- (Guinea-Bissau) Mauro Rodrigues
- (Madagascar) Warren Caddy
- (Madagascar) Nicolas Fontaine
- (Madagascar) Ehsan Kari
- (Nigeria) George Ilenikhena
- (Nigeria) Moses Usor
- (Nigeria) Alhassan Yusuf
- (Tanzania) Cyprian Kachwele
- (Tanzania) Alphonce Msanga
