= Bakhresa Group =

Tanzanian industrial conglomerate

- Industry: Conglomerate
- Founder: Said Bakhresa
- Headquarters: Tanzania
- Area served: Sub-Saharan Africa
- Products: Diversified
- Owner: Said Salim Bakhresa
- Website: Company Website

Bakhresa Group is an industrial conglomerate based in Tanzania, East Africa.It is owned by an entrepreneur and Tanzanian billionaire Said Salim Bakhresa, the business is one of the largest in the region.

The Group has its operations spread in Tanzania Mainland & Zanzibar, Kenya, Uganda, Malawi, Mozambique, Zambia, Rwanda, Burundi, Zimbabwe and in South Africa.

There are range of companies under its umbrella and with investments primarily in the Food and Beverage Sector, Packaging, Logistics, Marine Passenger Services, Petroleum and Entertainment. The products and services provided by the group are:

- Wheat Flour, Wheat Bran
- Maize Flour, Maize Bran
- Biscuits & Bakery Products
- Carbonated Soft Drinks & Malt Flavoured Products
- Natural Fruit Juices
- Ice Cream
- Bottled Water
- Polypropylene Bags including laminated bags for cement industries
- Plastic Packaging Materials including printing
- Paper Bags
- Petroleum Products
- Marine Passenger Ferry & Air passenger facilities Services
- Inland Container Depot
- Road Transport Services
- Azam TV
- Azam F.C.
