= Hemed Morocco =

Tanzanian association football manager

Hemed Moroko
Personal information
- Full name: Hemed Suleiman Ali
- Date of birth: 4 August 1970 (age 56)
- Place of birth: Zanzibar, Tanzania

Managerial career
- Years: Team
- 2012–2014: Mafunzo
- 2014–: Zanzibar
- 2018–2019: Singida United
- 2019–2020: Mbao
- 2020–2021: KMKM
- 2023: Geita Gold
- 2024–2025: Tanzania (interim)

Hemed Suleiman Ali, known as Hemed Morocco (born 4 August 1970, in Zanzibar) is a Tanzanian football coach. He is the interim manager of the Tanzania national team since January 2024 and the manager of the Zanzibar national team since October 2014.

== Managerial record ==
As of match played 15 November 2025

Managerial record by team and tenure
| Team | Nat | From | To | Record | | | | | Ref. |
| Team | Nat | From | To | G | W | D | L | Win % | Ref. |
|---|---|---|---|---|---|---|---|---|---|
| Zanzibar | | October 2014 | present | 18 | 5 | 6 | 7 | 38.46 | |
| Tanzania | | January 2024 | present | 37 | 13 | 7 | 17 | 35.14 | |
| Career Total | | | | 55 | 18 | 13 | 24 | 32.73 | — |
