= African Club Association =

Organisation of Africans football clubs

African Football Association
- Abbreviation: ACA
- Formation: 30 November 2023; 2 years ago
- Founded at: Cairo, Egypt
- Type: Sports organization
- Headquarters: Morocco
- Region served: Africa
- Members: over 300 clubs
- Official language: Arabic; English; French; Spanish
- Chairman: Hersi Said
- First vice-chairperson: Jessica Motaung
- Vice-chairperson: Paul Bassey
- Parent organization: CAF
- Website: cafonline.com

The African Club Association (ACA), is an association football organising body, an independent body for football clubs within Africa. Officially recognised by both CAF and FIFA.

== Leadership ==
Name	Position
(Tanzania) Hersi Said	Chairman
(South Africa) Jessica Motaung	1st Vice chairperson
(Nigeria) Paul Bassey	2nd Vice chairperson
