= Frank Assinki =

Ghanaian footballer

Personal information
- Full name: Kwabena Frank Assinki
- Date of birth: 15 April 2002 (age 24)
- Place of birth: Ghana
- Height: 1.91 m (6 ft 3 in)
- Position: Centre-back

Team information
- Current team: Singida Black Stars

Youth career
- Seven Wonders FC
- Blessed Assurance FC
- Third World FC

Senior career*
Years	Team	Apps	(Gls)
2018–2020	International Allies		
2020–2022	HB Køge	17	(0)
2021	→ KFUM Roskilde (loan)	8	(0)

International career^{‡}
2021–	Ghana U-20	6	(0)
- * Club domestic league appearances and goals ‡ National team caps and goals as of 30 April 2021 (UTC)

Kwabena Frank Assinki (born 15 April 2002) is a Ghanaian professional footballer who plays as a centre-back for Tanzanian Premier League club Young Africans, on loan from Tanzanian Premier League club Singida Black Stars.

== Career ==
=== Inter Allies ===
Assinki joined Tema-based club International Allies in 2018 and played for them in the Ghana Premier League prior to moving to Denmark. He made his debut in the 2020-21 Ghana Premier League season, making 12 appearances in 14 games before the league was brought to an abrupt end due to the COVID-19 pandemic. His performances in the league earned him one man of the match award within the season.

=== HB Køge ===
In July 2020, International Allies confirmed that Assinki had been signed by Danish 1st Division side HB Køge on a 4-year contract, in the process joining his Inter Allies teammate Victorien Adebayor at the club. On 7 January 2022 Køge confirmed, that they had terminated the contract with Assinki due to a "personnel matter", with the explanation that he had "violated the values and rules of the club".
