= Yannis Kari =

Footballer (born 2000)

Personal information
- Date of birth: 2 November 2000 (age 25)
- Place of birth: Marseille, France
- Height: 1.86 m (6 ft 1 in)
- Position: Centre-back

Team information
- Current team: Francs Borains
- Number: 83

Youth career
- Moulins
- 2016–2018: Marseille
- 2018–2019: Auxerre
- 2019–2020: AS Géménos

Senior career*
Years	Team	Apps	(Gls)
2020–2021	Moulins	6	(0)
2021–2023	Moulins Yzeure	29	(4)
2023–2025	Andrézieux-Bouthéon	49	(1)
2025	Fréjus Saint-Raphaël	8	(0)
2026–	Francs Borains	8	(0)

International career^{‡}
2023–	Comoros	5	(0)
- * Club domestic league appearances and goals as of 20 April 2026 ‡ National team caps and goals as of 21:18, 28 November 2025 (UTC)

Yannis Kari (born 2 November 2000) is a professional footballer who plays as a centre-back for the Belgian Challenger Pro League club Francs Borains. Born in France, he plays for the Comoros national team.

== Club career ==
Kari is a product of the academies of the French clubs Moulins, Marseille, Auxerre and AS Géménos. On 27 August 2020, he returned to Moulins in the Championnat National 3 where he began his senior career. In 2021, he moved to Moulins Yzeure where he spent a couple of seasons. On 8 July 2023, he transferred to Andrézieux-Bouthéon. On 4 September 2025, he transferred to Fréjus Saint-Raphaël.

== International career ==
Born in France, Kari is of Comorian and Malagasy descent, and holds French and Comorian citizenship. He was called up to the Comoros national team for the 2025 FIFA Arab Cup.

On 11 December 2025, Kari was called up to the Comoros squad for the 2025 Africa Cup of Nations.

== Personal life ==
Kari is the brother of Ehsan Kari, and the cousin of Yannick Pandor, both professional footballers.
