= Etienne Ndayiragije =

Burundian football manager

Personal information
- Date of birth: 3 December 1978 (age 47)
- Place of birth: Bujumbura, Burundi

Managerial career
- Years: Team
- 2015–2016: Vital'O
- 2019: Azam
- 2019–2021: Tanzania
- 2023–2024: Burundi
- 2024–2026: Kenya Police

Etienne Ndayiragije (born 3 December 1978) is a Burundian football manager.

== Managerial statistics ==
As of 29 December 2024

Managerial record by team and tenure
| Team | From | To | Record | | | | | |
| Team | From | To | P | W | D | L | Win % | Ref. |
|---|---|---|---|---|---|---|---|---|
| Tanzania | 1 August 2019 | 14 February 2021 | 11 | 3 | 4 | 4 | 27.27 | |
| Burundi | 25 January 2023 | 24 October 2024 | 15 | 4 | 3 | 8 | 26.67 | |
