= Tanzania Community Shield =

Tanzanian football super cup game

- Organiser(s): Tanzania Football Federation
- Founded: 2001; 25 years ago
- Region: Tanzania
- Teams: 4
- Related competitions: Tanzanian Premier League
- Current champions: Young Africans (9th title)
- Most championships: Simba (10 titles)
- Broadcaster: Azam TV
- 2025 Tanzania Community Shield

Tanzania Community Shield ("Ngao ya Jamii") is Tanzanian football's a competition with four teams, structured as Single-elimination tournament contested between the champions, Runner-up, Third place and Fourth place of the previous Tanzanian Premier League season.

The fixture is recognised as a competitive super cup by the Tanzania Football Federation and CAF.

== Winners ==
Year	Winner	Score	Finalist	Ref.
2001	Young Africans	2–1	Simba	
2002	Simba	4–1	Young Africans	
2003	Simba	1–0	Mtibwa Sugar	
2004	Cancelled			
2005	Simba	2–0	Young Africans	
2006	Not played			
2007	Not played			
2008	Not played			
2009	Mtibwa Sugar	1–0	Young Africans	
2010	Young Africans	0–0 (3–1 pen.)	Simba	
2011	Simba	0–0	Young Africans	
2012	Simba	3–2	Azam	
2013	Young Africans	1–0	Azam	
2014	Young Africans	3–0	Azam	
2015	Young Africans	0–0 (8–7 pen.)	Azam	
2016	Azam	2–2 (4–1 pen.)	Young Africans	
2017	Simba	0–0 (5–4 pen.)	Young Africans	
2018	Simba	2–1	Mtibwa Sugar	
2019	Simba	4–2	Azam	
2020	Simba	2–0	Namungo	
2021	Young Africans	1–0	Simba	
2022	Young Africans	2–1	Simba	
2023	Simba	0–0 (3–1 pen.)	Young Africans	
2024	Young Africans	4–1	Azam	
2025	Young Africans	1–0	Simba	

Source: RSSSF
