= Ehsan Kari =

Comorian footballer

Personal information
- Date of birth: 17 May 2002 (age 24)
- Place of birth: Aix-en-Provence, France
- Height: 1.87 m (6 ft 2 in)
- Position: Centre-back

Team information
- Current team: Virton
- Number: 4

Youth career
- Sedan
- 2018–2020: Metz

Senior career*
Years	Team	Apps	(Gls)
2020–2022	Metz II	9	(0)
2022–2023	Nîmes	0	(0)
2023–2025	Grasse	24	(0)
2025–2026	Fréjus Saint-Raphaël	17	(0)
2026–	Virton	5	(1)

International career^{‡}
2025–	Madagascar	8	(2)
- * Club domestic league appearances and goals as of 20 September 2026 ‡ National team caps and goals as of 21:00, 25 September 2026 (UTC)

Ehsan Kari (born 17 May 2002) is a professional footballer who plays as a centre-back for Challenger Pro League club Virton in Belgium. Born in France, he plays for the Madagascar national team.

== Club career ==
Kari is a product of the academies of the French clubs Sedan and Metz. On 16 July 2020, he signed an apprenticeship contract with Metz and was promoted to their reserves. On 23 August 2022, he joined Nîmes. He moved to Grasse in 2023, where he played for 2 seasons. On 4 July 2025, he transferred to Fréjus Saint-Raphaël.

== International career ==
Born in France, Kari is of Comorian and Malagasy descent, and holds French and Malagasy citizenship. In May 2025, he was called up to the Madagascar national team for a set of friendlies.

=== International goals ===
Scores and results list Madagascar's goal tally first.

No.	Date	Venue	Opponent	Score	Result	Competition
1.	17 November 2025	Arslan Zeki Demirci Sports Complex, Manavgat, Turkey	Equatorial Guinea	2–0	2–0	Friendly
2.	25 September 2026	Godswill Akpabio International Stadium, Uyo, Nigeria	Nigeria	1–0	1–2	2027 Africa Cup of Nations qualification

== Personal life ==
Kari is the brother of Yannis Kari, and the cousin of Yannick Pandor, both professional footballers.
