= Badru Hafidh =

Tanzanian professional football manager

Personal information
- Place of birth: Tanzania

Managerial career
- Years: Team
- 199x–1998: Tanzania
- 2003–2006: Tanzania

Badru Hafidh is a Tanzanian professional football manager. Until 1998 and from September 2003 to July 2006 he coached the Tanzania national football team.
