= Mauro Rodrigues =

Bissau-Guinean footballer

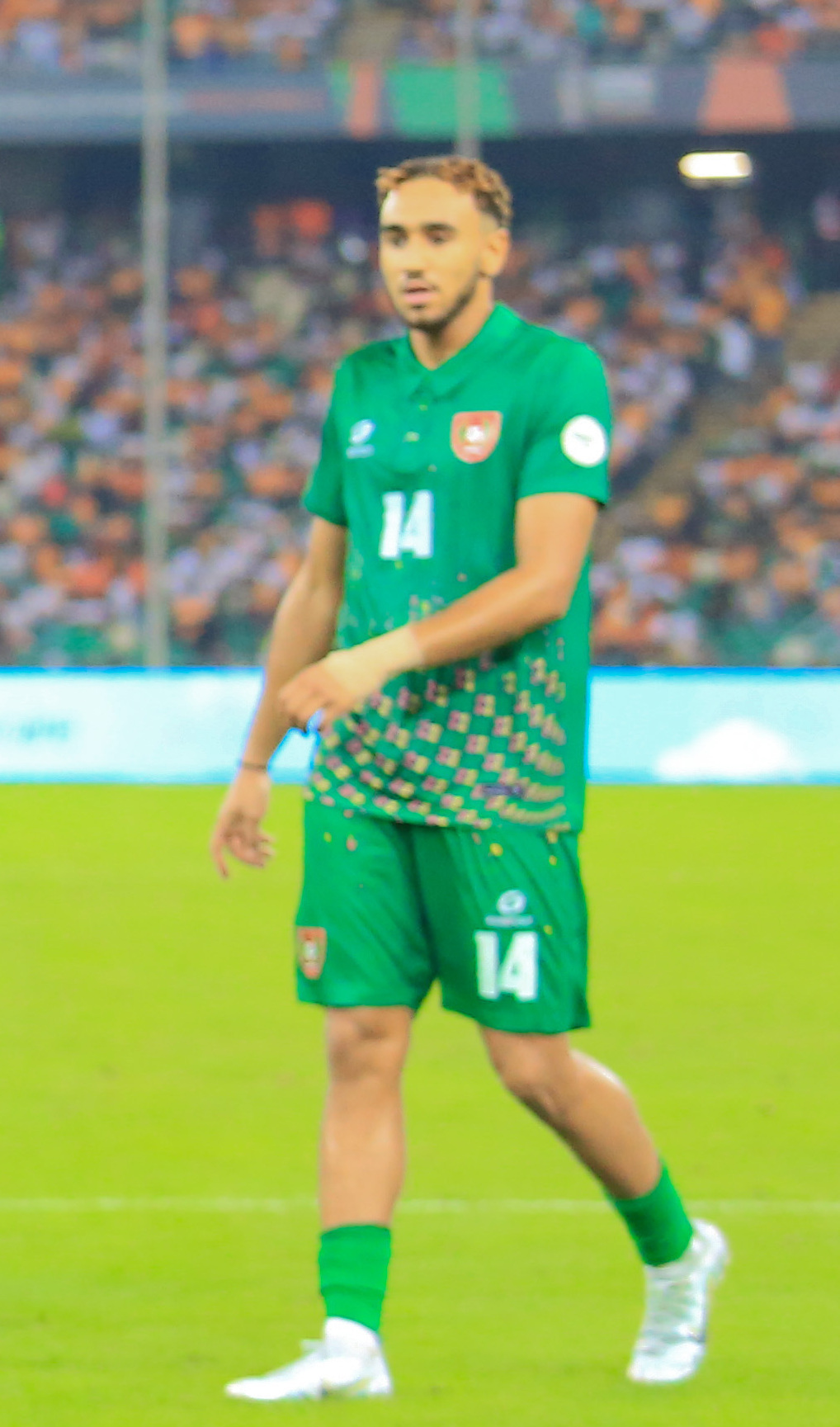
- Rodrigues in 2024

Personal information
- Full name: Mauro Daniel Rodrigues Teixeira
- Date of birth: 15 April 2001 (age 25)
- Place of birth: Funchal, Madeira, Portugal
- Height: 1.78 m (5 ft 10 in)
- Position: Winger

Team information
- Current team: Botev Plovdiv
- Number: 19

Youth career
- 2015–2020: Sion

Senior career*
Years	Team	Apps	(Gls)
2018–2023	Sion U21	72	(9)
2020–2023	Sion	2	(0)
2022–2023	→ Yverdon (loan)	16	(2)
2023–2026	Yverdon	104	(11)
2026	→ Oleksandriya (loan)	13	(1)
2026–	Botev Plovdiv	12	(2)

International career^{‡}
2021–	Guinea-Bissau	29	(3)
- * Club domestic league appearances and goals as of 31 October 2026 ‡ National team caps and goals as of 17 November 2026

Mauro Daniel Rodrigues Teixeira (born 15 April 2001) is a professional footballer who plays as a midfielder for Bulgarian First League club Botev Plovdiv. Born in Portugal, Rodrigues represents the Guinea-Bissau national team.

== Club career ==
On 21 February 2021, Rodrigues signed a professional contract with FC Sion. He made his professional debut with Sion in a 2–1 Swiss Super League loss to Servette FC on 14 March 2021.

On 15 June 2022, Rodrigues joined Yverdon on loan. On 22 February 2023, the deal was made permanent.

== International career ==
Born in Portugal, Rodrigues is of Bissau-Guinean descent. He was called up to represent the Guinea Bissau national team on 18 March 2021. He debuted with Guinea Bissau in a 3–0 2021 Africa Cup of Nations qualification win over Congo on 30 March 2021.

=== International goals ===
Scores and results list Guinea-Bissau goal tally first, score column indicates score after each Rodrigues goal.

List of international goals scored by Mauro Rodrigues
No.	Date	Venue	Opponent	Score	Result	Competition
1	26 March 2022	Estádio Municipal, Rio Maior, Portugal	Angola	2–3	2–3	Friendly
2	20 November 2023	Al Salam Stadium, Cairo, Egypt	Djibouti	1–0	1–0	2026 FIFA World Cup qualification
3	17 November 2026	24 September Stadium, Bissau, Guinea-Bissau	Madagascar	2–0	2–0	2027 Africa Cup of Nations qualification
