= Jessica Motaung =

South African beauty queen and sports executive

Member of FIFA Men’s Football Stakeholders Committee
- Incumbent
- Assumed office 8 October 2025
- President: Gianni Infantino

First vice-chairperson of Africans Club Association
- Incumbent
- Assumed office 30 November 2023

Marketing Director of Kaizer Chiefs
- Incumbent
- Assumed office 2003

Personal details
- Born: Jessica Kaizer Motaung; 23 August 1973 (age 53) Johannesburg, South Africa
- Height: 1.75 m (5 ft 9 in)
- Children: 2
- Parent: Kaizer Motaung (father)
- Relatives: Bobby Motaung (brother); Kaizer Motaung Junior (brother)
- Occupation: Sports Executive

Jessica Kaizer Motaung (born 23 August 1973) is a South African television personality, sports executive, and beauty pageant titleholder.

== Career ==
Motaung was appointed marketing director of the Kaizer Chiefs Football Club in 2003.

In 2022 she was appointed to CAF's organizing committee on women's football. In 2023 she was appointed vice-president of the CAF African Clubs Association (ACA). In 2025 she was appointed to the FIFA Men's Football Stakeholders Committee.

== Personal life ==
Motaung was born to soccer boss Kaizer Motaung and his wife Valeta (née Julegka) in Johannesburg and is the third of five children. Jessica Motaung has three brothers Thabo (1969–2012), Bobby (born 1970), Kaizer Jnr (born 1981), and a younger sister Kemiso (born 1979).

== Pageantry ==
=== Miss Gauteng ===
She won the Miss Gauteng 1997 crown.

=== Miss South Africa ===
Motaung was first princess to Miss South Africa 1997 winner Kerishnie Naicker. Due to Naicker not be able to make the Miss World event she was selected to represent South Africa at Miss World 1997.

=== Miss World ===
She was named second princess to Miss World 1997 winner Diana Hayden of India. She won the Miss World Africa 1997 title.

== Outside Football ==
In 1998 she was the presenter of Speak Out, an investigative news programme produced by the South African Broadcasting Corporation.

== Awards ==
- Miss World 1997: Second Princess
- Miss South Africa 1997: First Princess
- Miss Gauteng 1997
- Women's Day Awards, seven most influential women in South Africa. (2014)
- Top Ten, South Africa's most influential women (2015)
- Honoured by Protea Glen Secondary School as one of South Africa's most influential women (2020)
