= Tanzania national football team =

Men's football team

Tanzania
- Nickname: The Taifa Stars
- Association: Tanzania Football Federation (TFF)
- Confederation: CAF (Africa)
- Sub-confederation: CECAFA (East & Central Africa)
- Head coach: Miguel Ángel Gamondi
- Captain: Mbwana Samatta
- Most caps: Erasto Nyoni (108)
- Top scorer: Simon Msuva & Mrisho Ngasa (25)
- Home stadium: Benjamin Mkapa Stadium
- FIFA code: TAN
| First colours | Second colours | Third colours |

FIFA ranking
- Current: 112 ▲3 (18 November 2026)
- Highest: 65 (February 1995)
- Lowest: 175 (October–November 2005)

First international
- Uganda 7–0 Tanganyika (Uganda; Date Unknown 1945) as Tanzania; Tanzania 1–1 Kenya (Tanzania; 1 March 1969)

Biggest win
- Tanzania 7–0 Somalia (Jinja, Uganda; 1 December 1995); Somalia 0–7 Tanzania (Kampala, Uganda; 1 December 2012)

Biggest defeat
- Tanganyika 0–9 Kenya (Tanganyika; Date Unknown 1956) as Tanzania; Saudi Arabia 8–0 Tanzania (Dammam, Saudi Arabia; 11 September 1998)

Africa Cup of Nations
- Appearances: 5 (first in 1980)
- Best result: Round of 16 (2025)

African Nations Championship
- Appearances: 3 (first in 2009)
- Best result: Group stage (2009, 2020)

COSAFA Cup
- Appearances: 3 (first in 1997)
- Best result: Third place (2017)

CECAFA Cup
- Appearances: 36 (first in 1973)
- Best result: Champions (1974, 1994, 2010)

The Tanzania national football team (Swahili: Timu ya Taifa ya Mpira wa Miguu ya Tanzania) represents Tanzania in men's international football and is controlled by the Tanzania Football Federation, the governing body for football in Tanzania, Tanzania's home ground is Benjamin Mkapa National Stadium in Dar es Salaam and their head coach is Hemed Morocco from Tanzania. They are colloquially known as the Taifa Stars. Tanzania has never qualified for the FIFA World Cup. Before uniting with Zanzibar, the team played as the Tanganyika national football team. The team represents both FIFA and Confederation of African Football (CAF).

The island of Zanzibar, part of Tanzania (and once an independent nation), is also an associate member of CAF and has played matches with other nations, but is not eligible to enter the World Cup or Africa Cup of Nations. See Zanzibar national football team.

== History ==
Since qualifying for the 1980 Africa Cup of Nations, Tanzania endured nearly 40 years without major success, struggling in both African and World Cup qualifiers. Their best effort was in the 2008 Africa Cup of Nations qualification, where the Taifa Stars defeated Burkina Faso twice and only finished three points behind group winners Senegal. In 2010 Tanzania won the CECAFA Cup for the third time.

A recent achievement was a 1–0 win against South Africa in the 2017 COSAFA Cup quarter-finals. But afterwards, Tanzania lost the semi-finals 2–4 to Zambia. Then, in the third-place playoff, Tanzania managed to win the match against Lesotho 4–2 in a penalty shootout after the extra time ended in a goalless draw. This third place result was considered Tanzania's biggest football achievement in many years.

On 24 March 2019, Tanzania beat East African rivals Uganda 3–0 to qualify for the Africa Cup of Nations for the first time in 39 years. At AFCON the Taifa Stars, being the weakest team in the group, lost all three Group C matches, as predicted. A few months later, Tanzania qualified for the African Nations Championship for only the second time, as well as defeating Burundi in the 2022 World Cup qualifiers.

On 19 November 2024, Tanzania won a narrow victory of 1–0 against Guinea which secured their fourth tournament since 1980. A decisive goal by Simon Msuva sent them to the tournament in 2025. In that tournament, the team advanced from the group stage as one of the best third-placed teams despite not winning a match, ending their campaign in the Round of 16 after a loss to eventual champion Morocco.

In February 2026, Tanzania's Ministry of Sports extended Miguel Ángel Gamondi's contract to coach the national football team.

== Team image ==
=== Kit suppliers ===
| Kit supplier | Period |
|---|---|
| (Germany) Uhlsport | 2017–2023 |
| (Tanzania) Sandaland | 2023– |

== Results and fixtures ==
The following is a list of match results in the last 12 months, as well as any future matches that have been scheduled.

Win Draw Loss Fixture

=== 2025 ===
| 15 November Friendly | Kuwait | 4–3 | Tanzania | Cairo, Egypt |
| 18:00 UTC+2 | | Report | | Stadium: Al Salam Stadium |

| 23 December 2025 AFCON GS | Nigeria | 2–1 | Tanzania | Fez, Morocco |
| 18:30 UTC+1 | Ajayi 36'; Lookman 52' | Report | M'Mombwa 50' | Stadium: Fez Stadium; Attendance: 11,444; Referee: Dahane Beida (Mauritania) |

| 27 December 2025 AFCON GS | Uganda | 1–1 | Tanzania | Rabat, Morocco |
| 18:30 UTC+1 | Ikpeazu 80' | Report | Msuva 59' (pen.) | Stadium: Al Medina Stadium; Attendance: 10,540; Referee: Jalal Jayed (Morocco) |

| 30 December 2025 AFCON GS | Tanzania | 1–1 | Tunisia | Rabat, Morocco |
| 17:00 UTC+1 | Salum 48' | Report | Gharbi 43' (pen.) | Stadium: Rabat Olympic Stadium; Attendance: 15,205; Referee: Jean-Jacques Ndala (DR Congo) |

=== 2026 ===
| 4 January 2025 AFCON R16 | Morocco | 1–0 | Tanzania | Rabat, Morocco |
| 17:00 UTC+1 | Díaz 64' | Report | | Stadium: Prince Moulay Abdellah Stadium; Attendance: 63,894; Referee: Boubou Traore (Mali) |

| 26 March 2026 FIFA Series | Tanzania | 0–1 | Liechtenstein | Kigali, Rwanda |
| 16:30 UTC+2 | | Report | Sağlam 55' | Stadium: Kigali Pelé Stadium; Referee: Mohamed Diraneh (Djibouti) |

| 29 March 2026 FIFA Series | Macau | 0–6 | Tanzania | Kigali, Rwanda |
| 15:00 UTC+2 | | Report | Amâncio 16' (o.g.); Mwamnyeto 26'; Yahya 45'; Peter 56'; Miroshi 74'; Allarakhia 87' | Stadium: Kigali Pelé Stadium; Attendance: 12,900; Referee: Lucky Kasalirwe (Uganda) |

| 4 June Friendly | Tanzania | Cancelled | Uganda | Marrakesh, Morocco |
| 21:00 UTC+1 | | | | Stadium: Marrakesh Stadium |

| 8 June Friendly | Tanzania | Cancelled | Rwanda | Marrakesh, Morocco |
| 21:00 UTC+1 | | | | Stadium: Marrakesh Stadium |

| 25 September 2027 AFCON qualification | Tanzania | 0–2 | Guinea-Bissau | Zanzibar City, Tanzania |
| 16:00 UTC+3 | | Report | Franculino 33'; Mam. Baldé 58' | Stadium: Amaan Stadium; Referee: Brighton Chimene (Zimbabwe) |

| 29 September 2027 AFCON qualification | Madagascar | 1–1 | Tanzania | Meknes, Morocco |
| 14:00 UTC+1 | Fontaine 50' | Report | Kachwele 39' | Stadium: Meknes Honor Stadium; Referee: Tanguy Mebiame (Gabon) |

| 11 November 2027 AFCON qualification | Nigeria | v | Tanzania | TBD, Nigeria |
| TBD | | | | Stadium: TBD |

| 15 November 2027 AFCON qualification | Tanzania | v | Nigeria | TBD, Tanzania |
| TBD | | | | Stadium: TBD |

=== 2027 ===
| 24 March 2027 AFCON qualification | Guinea-Bissau | v | Tanzania | TBD, Guinea-Bissau |
| TBD | | | | Stadium: TBD |

| 28 March 2027 AFCON qualification | Tanzania | v | Madagascar | TBD, Tanzania |
| TBD | | | | Stadium: TBD |

== Coaching staff ==
| Head coach | (Argentina) Miguel Ángel Gamondi |
| Assistant coach | (Tanzania) Juma Mgunda |
| Assistant coach | (Tanzania) Hemed Morocco |
| Goalkeeper coach | (Saudi Arabia) Osama Al-Hamdan |
| Physical coach | (Finland) Mikael Mayoyo |
| Sports therapist | (Belgium) Joris De Vos |
| Head of medical | (Tanzania) Lisobine Kisongo |
| Team manager | (Tanzania) Reinhard |
| Video analysis | (Tanzania) Gabriel Johnson |

=== Coaching history ===
Caretaker managers are listed in italics.

- (West Germany) Bert Trautmann (1975)
- (England) Geoff Hudson (1977–1979)
- (Poland) Sławomir Wolk (1979–1980)
- (Tanzania) Mahammed Msomali (1980–1981)
- (West Germany) Rudi Gutendorf (1981)
- (Zanzibar) Joseph Bendera (1981–1985)
- (Tanzania) Paul West (1985–1989)
- (Tanzania) Charles Boniface Mkwasa (1989–1992)
- (Tanzania) Sunday Kayuni (1993–1995)
- (Brazil) Clóvis de Oliveira (1995–1996)
- (Tanzania) Badru Hafidh (1996–1998)
- (Tanzania) Sylersaid Mziray (1998–1999)
- (Tanzania) Mansour Magram (1999–00)
- (Germany) Burkhard Pape (2000–01)
- (Tanzania) Mshindo Msolla (2001–02)
- (Kenya) James Siang'a (2002)
- (Tanzania) Mshindo Msolla (2002–03)
- (Tanzania) Badru Hafidh (2003–06)
- (Brazil) Júlio César Leal (2006)
- (Brazil) Márcio Máximo (2006–10)
- (Denmark) Jan Poulsen (2010–12)
- (Denmark) Kim Poulsen (2012–14)
- (Tanzania) Salum Madadi (2014)
- (Netherlands) Mart Nooij (2014–2015)
- (Tanzania) Charles Boniface Mkwasa (2015–2017)
- (Tanzania) Salum Mayanga (2017–2018)
- (Nigeria) Emmanuel Amunike (2018–2019)
- (Burundi) Etienne Ndayiragije (2019–2021)
- (Denmark) Kim Poulsen (2021–2022)
- (Zambia) Honour Janza (2022)
- (Tanzania) Dean Alty (2022)
- (Denmark) Kim Poulsen (2022–2023)
- (Algeria) Adel Amrouche (2023–2024)
- (Tanzania) Hemed Morocco (2024–2025)
- (Argentina) Miguel Ángel Gamondi (2025–present)

== Players ==
=== Current squad ===
The following players were called up for the 2026 FIFA Series (men's matches) matches against Liechtenstein and Macau on 26 and 29 March 2026, respectively.

Caps and goals correct as of 29 March 2026, after the match against Macau.

| No. | Pos. | Player | Date of birth (age) | Caps | Goals | Club |
|---|---|---|---|---|---|---|
| 1 | GK | Yonna Geoffrey | 9 August 1999 (age 27) | 1 | 0 | (Tanzania Football Federation) Pamba |
| 13 | GK | Zuberi Foba | 23 May 2002 (age 24) | 3 | 0 | (Tanzania Football Federation) Azam |
| 18 | GK | Aishi Manula | 13 September 1995 (age 31) | 66 | 0 | (Tanzania Football Federation) Azam |
| | GK | Yona Amosi | 9 August 1999 (age 27) | 0 | 0 | (Tanzania Football Federation) Pamba |
| 2 | MF | Haji Mnoga | 16 April 2002 (age 24) | 20 | 0 | (Royal Belgian Football Association) Patro Eisden |
| 3 | DF | Nickson Kibabage | 12 October 2000 (age 26) | 17 | 0 | (Tanzania Football Federation) Simba |
| 4 | DF | Lameck Lawi | 12 September 2005 (age 21) | 2 | 0 | (Tanzania Football Federation) Azam |
| 5 | DF | Nuru Twalib | 1 January 2003 (age 23) | 2 | 0 | (Tanzania Football Federation) Azam |
| 14 | DF | Bakari Mwamnyeto (vice-captain) | 5 October 1995 (age 31) | 54 | 1 | (Tanzania Football Federation) Young Africans |
| 15 | DF | Mohamed Husseini | 1 November 1996 (age 30) | 65 | 1 | (Tanzania Football Federation) Young Africans |
| 24 | DF | Mohamed Mussa | 29 April 2004 (age 22) | 1 | 0 | (Tanzania Football Federation) Mashujaa |
| | DF | Ibrahim Hamad | 12 November 1997 (age 29) | 37 | 1 | (Tanzania Football Federation) Young Africans |
| 6 | MF | Feisal Salum | 11 January 1998 (age 28) | 62 | 5 | (Tanzania Football Federation) Azam |
| 8 | MF | Charles M'Mombwa | 14 March 1998 (age 28) | 20 | 4 | (Malta Football Association) Floriana |
| 12 | MF | Morice Abraham | 13 August 2003 (age 23) | 12 | 0 | (Tanzania Football Federation) Simba |
| 16 | MF | Kelvin Nashon | 2 August 2000 (age 26) | 2 | 0 | (Tanzania Football Federation) Pamba |
| 17 | MF | Alphonce Msanga | 14 June 2003 (age 23) | 10 | 0 | (Association of Football Federations of Azerbaijan) Şamaxı |
| 20 | MF | Novatus Miroshi | 2 September 2002 (age 24) | 37 | 4 | (Turkish Football Federation) Göztepe |
| 23 | MF | Mudathir Yahya | 6 May 1995 (age 31) | 41 | 2 | (Tanzania Football Federation) Young Africans |
| | MF | Yusuf Kagoma | 3 April 1996 (age 30) | 9 | 0 | (Tanzania Football Federation) Simba |
| 7 | FW | Iddy Nado | 3 November 1995 (age 31) | 25 | 1 | (Tanzania Football Federation) Azam |
| 9 | FW | Paul Peter | 30 November 2003 (age 22) | 4 | 1 | (Tanzania Football Federation) JKT Tanzania |
| 10 | FW | Kelvin John | 10 June 2003 (age 23) | 14 | 1 | (Danish Football Association) AaB |
| 11 | FW | Tarryn Allarakhia | 17 November 1997 (age 29) | 14 | 2 | (The Football Association) Boreham Wood |
| 19 | FW | Selemani Mwalimu | 19 January 2006 (age 20) | 9 | 1 | (Tanzania Football Federation) Simba |
| 22 | FW | Bakari Msimu | 10 December 2007 (age 18) | 1 | 0 | (Tanzania Football Federation) Coastal Union |
| | FW | Simon Msuva | 2 October 1993 (age 33) | 103 | 25 | (Iraq Football Association) Al-Talaba |

=== Recent call-ups ===
The following players have been called up for Tanzania in the last 12 months.

| Pos. | Player | Date of birth (age) | Caps | Goals | Club | Latest call-up |
|---|---|---|---|---|---|---|
| GK | Hussein Masalanga | 4 March 1992 (age 34) | 3 | 0 | (Tanzania) Singida Black Stars | 2025 Africa Cup of Nations |
| GK | Yakoub Suleiman Ali | 7 December 1999 (age 26) | 13 | 0 | (Tanzania) Simba | 2025 Africa Cup of Nations |
| DF | Pascal Msindo | 15 August 2003 (age 23) | 18 | 0 | (Tanzania) Azam | 2025 Africa Cup of Nations |
| DF | Dickson Job | 29 December 2000 (age 25) | 43 | 1 | (Tanzania) Young Africans | 2025 Africa Cup of Nations |
| DF | Wilson Nangu | 30 September 2001 (age 25) | 2 | 0 | (Tanzania) Simba | 2025 Africa Cup of Nations |
| DF | Lusajo Mwaikenda | 27 October 2000 (age 26) | 24 | 0 | (Tanzania) Azam | 2025 Africa Cup of Nations |
| DF | Shomari Kapombe | 28 January 1992 (age 34) | 95 | 2 | (Tanzania) Simba | 2025 Africa Cup of Nations |
| MF | Khalid Habibu | 10 September 2001 (age 25) | 4 | 0 | (Tanzania) Singida Black Stars | 2025 Africa Cup of Nations |
| FW | Mbwana Samatta (captain) | 23 December 1992 (age 33) | 89 | 22 | (France) Le Havre | 2025 Africa Cup of Nations |
| FW | Kibu Denis | 4 December 1998 (age 27) | 27 | 0 | (Tanzania) Simba | 2025 Africa Cup of Nations |
| FW | Abdul Hamisi Suleiman | 26 February 2001 (age 25) | 27 | 4 | (Tanzania) Azam | 2025 Africa Cup of Nations |
^{DEC} Player refused to join the team after the call-up.^{INJ} Player withdrew from the squad due to an injury.^{PRE} Preliminary squad.^{RET} Player has retired from international football.^{SUS} Suspended from the national team.

== Player records ==
As of 4 January 2026
Players in bold are still active with Tanzania.

=== Most appearances ===
| Rank | Player | Caps | Goals | Career |
|---|---|---|---|---|
| 1 | Erasto Nyoni | 108 | 7 | 2006–2021 |
| 2 | **Simon Msuva** | 103 | 25 | 2012–present |
| 3 | Mrisho Ngassa | 100 | 25 | 2006–2015 |
| 4 | Kelvin Yondani | 97 | 0 | 2008–2021 |
| 5 | **Shomari Kapombe** | 95 | 2 | 2011–present |
| 6 | **Mbwana Samatta** | 89 | 22 | 2011–present |
| 7 | John Bocco | 84 | 16 | 2009–2023 |
| 8 | **Himid Mao** | 81 | 2 | 2013–present |
| 9 | Juma Kaseja | 79 | 0 | 2002–2021 |
| 10 | **Aishi Manula** | 68 | 0 | 2015–present |

=== Top goalscorers ===
| Rank | Player | Goals | Caps | Ratio | Career |
|---|---|---|---|---|---|
| 1 | Mrisho Ngassa | 25 | 100 | 0.25 | 2006–2015 |
| 1 | **Simon Msuva** | 25 | 103 | 0.24 | 2012–present |
| 3 | **Mbwana Samatta** | 22 | 89 | 0.25 | 2011–present |
| 4 | John Bocco | 16 | 84 | 0.19 | 2009–2023 |
| 5 | John Nteze Lungu | 12 | 22 | 0.55 | 1992–2002 |
| 6 | Jerson Tegete | 8 | 28 | 0.29 | 2006–2011 |
| 6 | Danny Mrwanda | 8 | 34 | 0.24 | 2005–2011 |
| 8 | Mohamed Rajab | 7 | 20 | 0.35 | 2002–2011 |
| 8 | Thomas Ulimwengu | 7 | 51 | 0.14 | 2010–2021 |
| 8 | Erasto Nyoni | 7 | 108 | 0.06 | 2006–2021 |

== Competitive record ==
=== FIFA World Cup ===
| FIFA World Cup record | | | | | | | | | Qualification record | | | | | |
| Year | Round | Position | Pld | W | D | L | GF | GA | Pld | W | D | L | GF | GA |
|---|---|---|---|---|---|---|---|---|---|---|---|---|---|---|
| 1930 to 1962 | Not a FIFA member | | | | | | | | Not a FIFA member | | | | | |
| 1966 and 1970 | Did not enter | | | | | | | | Did not enter | | | | | |
| (West Germany) 1974 | Did not qualify | | | | | | | | 3 | 0 | 2 | 1 | 1 | 4 |
| (Argentina) 1978 | Withdrew | | | | | | | | Withdrew | | | | | |
| (Spain) 1982 | Did not qualify | | | | | | | | 4 | 1 | 1 | 2 | 7 | 6 |
| (Mexico) 1986 | Did not qualify | | | | | | | | 2 | 0 | 2 | 0 | 1 | 1 |
| (Italy) 1990 | Did not enter | | | | | | | | Did not enter | | | | | |
| (United States) 1994 | Withdrew during qualifying | | | | | | | | Withdrew during qualifying | | | | | |
| (France) 1998 | Did not qualify | | | | | | | | 2 | 0 | 1 | 1 | 1 | 2 |
| (South Korea) (Japan) 2002 | Did not qualify | | | | | | | | 2 | 0 | 0 | 2 | 2 | 4 |
| (Germany) 2006 | Did not qualify | | | | | | | | 2 | 0 | 1 | 1 | 0 | 3 |
| (South Africa) 2010 | Did not qualify | | | | | | | | 6 | 2 | 2 | 2 | 9 | 6 |
| (Brazil) 2014 | Did not qualify | | | | | | | | 8 | 3 | 0 | 5 | 10 | 14 |
| (Russia) 2018 | Did not qualify | | | | | | | | 4 | 1 | 1 | 2 | 4 | 10 |
| (Qatar) 2022 | Did not qualify | | | | | | | | 8 | 2 | 4 | 2 | 8 | 10 |
| (Canada) (Mexico) (United States) 2026 | Did not qualify | | | | | | | | 8 | 3 | 1 | 4 | 6 | 7 |
| (Morocco) (Portugal) (Spain) 2030 | To be determined | | | | | | | | | | | | | |
| (Saudi Arabia) 2034 | To be determined | | | | | | | | | | | | | |
| Total | | 0/16 | | | | | | | 49 | 12 | 15 | 22 | 49 | 67 |

=== Africa Cup of Nations ===
| Africa Cup of Nations record | | | | | | | | | Qualification record | | | | | |
| Year | Round | Position | Pld | W | D | L | GF | GA | Pld | W | D | L | GF | GA |
| as Tanganyika | | | | | | | | | as Tanganyika | | | | | |
|---|---|---|---|---|---|---|---|---|---|---|---|---|---|---|
| (Sudan) 1957 | Not affiliated to CAF | | | | | | | | Not affiliated to CAF | | | | | |
| (United Arab Republic) 1959 | Not affiliated to CAF | | | | | | | | Not affiliated to CAF | | | | | |
| (Ethiopia) 1962 | Not affiliated to CAF | | | | | | | | Not affiliated to CAF | | | | | |
| (Ghana) 1963 | Not affiliated to CAF | | | | | | | | Not affiliated to CAF | | | | | |
| as Tanzania | | | | | | | | | as Tanzania | | | | | |
| (Tunisia) 1965 | Not affiliated to CAF | | | | | | | | Not affiliated to CAF | | | | | |
| (Ethiopia) 1968 | Withdrew during qualifying | | | | | | | | Withdrew during qualifying | | | | | |
| (Sudan) 1970 | Did not qualify | | | | | | | | 4 | 1 | 1 | 2 | 3 | 10 |
| (Cameroon) 1972 | Did not qualify | | | | | | | | 2 | 0 | 1 | 1 | 2 | 6 |
| (Egypt) 1974 | Did not qualify | | | | | | | | 4 | 1 | 2 | 1 | 5 | 3 |
| (Ethiopia) 1976 | Did not qualify | | | | | | | | 2 | 0 | 1 | 1 | 3 | 6 |
| (Ghana) 1978 | Withdrew during qualifying | | | | | | | | Withdrew during qualifying | | | | | |
| (Nigeria) 1980 | Group stage | 7th | 3 | 0 | 1 | 2 | 3 | 6 | 4 | 2 | 1 | 1 | 8 | 4 |
| (Libya) 1982 | Withdrew | | | | | | | | Withdrew | | | | | |
| (Ivory Coast) 1984 | Did not qualify | | | | | | | | 2 | 0 | 1 | 1 | 3 | 4 |
| (Egypt) 1986 | Withdrew during qualifying | | | | | | | | Withdrew during qualifying | | | | | |
| (Morocco) 1988 | Did not qualify | | | | | | | | 3 | 0 | 1 | 2 | 3 | 6 |
| (Algeria) 1990 | Did not qualify | | | | | | | | 2 | 0 | 2 | 0 | 2 | 2 |
| (Senegal) 1992 | Did not qualify | | | | | | | | 6 | 1 | 2 | 3 | 4 | 7 |
| (Tunisia) 1994 | Withdrew during qualifying | | | | | | | | Withdrew during qualifying | | | | | |
| (South Africa) 1996 | Did not qualify | | | | | | | | 10 | 4 | 0 | 6 | 14 | 15 |
| (Burkina Faso) 1998 | Did not qualify | | | | | | | | 6 | 1 | 2 | 3 | 5 | 7 |
| (Ghana) (Nigeria) 2000 | Did not qualify | | | | | | | | 2 | 0 | 0 | 2 | 0 | 2 |
| (Mali) 2002 | Did not qualify | | | | | | | | 2 | 0 | 0 | 2 | 2 | 4 |
| (Tunisia) 2004 | Withdrew during qualifying | | | | | | | | Withdrew during qualifying | | | | | |
| (Egypt) 2006 | Did not qualify | | | | | | | | 2 | 0 | 1 | 1 | 0 | 3 |
| (Ghana) 2008 | Did not qualify | | | | | | | | 6 | 2 | 2 | 2 | 4 | 7 |
| (Angola) 2010 | Did not qualify | | | | | | | | 2 | 2 | 2 | 2 | 9 | 6 |
| (Equatorial Guinea) (Gabon) 2012 | Did not qualify | | | | | | | | 6 | 1 | 2 | 3 | 6 | 9 |
| (South Africa) 2013 | Did not qualify | | | | | | | | 2 | 0 | 2 | 0 | 2 | 2 |
| (Equatorial Guinea) 2015 | Did not qualify | | | | | | | | 4 | 1 | 2 | 1 | 6 | 6 |
| (Gabon) 2017 | Did not qualify | | | | | | | | 4 | 0 | 1 | 3 | 0 | 6 |
| (Egypt) 2019 | Group stage | 24th | 3 | 0 | 0 | 3 | 2 | 8 | 6 | 2 | 2 | 2 | 6 | 5 |
| (Cameroon) 2021 | Did not qualify | | | | | | | | 6 | 2 | 1 | 3 | 5 | 6 |
| (Ivory Coast) 2023 | Group stage | 22nd | 3 | 0 | 2 | 1 | 1 | 4 | 6 | 2 | 2 | 2 | 3 | 4 |
| (Morocco) 2025 | Round of 16 | 16th | 4 | 0 | 2 | 2 | 3 | 5 | 6 | 3 | 1 | 2 | 5 | 4 |
| (Kenya) (Tanzania) (Uganda) 2027 | Qualified as co-hosts | | | | | | | | Qualified as co-hosts | | | | | |
| 2028 | To be determined | | | | | | | | To be determined | | | | | |
| Total | Round of 16 | 4/35 | 13 | 0 | 5 | 8 | 9 | 23 | 99 | 25 | 32 | 42 | 100 | 134 |

=== African Nations Championship ===
| African Nations Championship record | | | | | | | | | Qualification record | | | | | |
| Appearances: 3 | | | | | | | | | Appearances: 7 | | | | | |
| Year | Round | Position | Pld | W | D* | L | GF | GA | Pld | W | D | L | GF | GA |
|---|---|---|---|---|---|---|---|---|---|---|---|---|---|---|
| (Ivory Coast) 2009 | Group stage | 5th | 3 | 1 | 1 | 1 | 2 | 2 | 6 | 4 | 1 | 1 | 10 | 4 |
| (Sudan) 2011 | Did not qualify | | | | | | | | 3 | 1 | 1 | 1 | 7 | 2 |
| (South Africa) 2014 | Did not qualify | | | | | | | | 2 | 0 | 0 | 2 | 1 | 4 |
| (Rwanda) 2016 | Did not qualify | | | | | | | | 2 | 0 | 1 | 1 | 1 | 4 |
| (Morocco) 2018 | Did not qualify | | | | | | | | 2 | 0 | 2 | 0 | 1 | 1 |
| (Cameroon) 2020 | Group stage | 10th | 3 | 1 | 1 | 1 | 3 | 4 | 4 | 1 | 2 | 1 | 2 | 2 |
| (Algeria) 2022 | Did not qualify | | | | | | | | 4 | 2 | 0 | 2 | 3 | 5 |
| (Kenya) (Tanzania) (Uganda) 2024 | Quarter-finals | 7th | 5 | 3 | 1 | 1 | 5 | 2 | Qualified as hosts | | | | | |
| Total | Quarter-finals | 2/7 | 6 | 2 | 2 | 2 | 5 | 6 | 23 | 8 | 7 | 8 | 25 | 22 |

=== African Games ===
African Games record
| Year | Result | Pld | W | D | L | GF | GA |
|---|---|---|---|---|---|---|---|
| (Nigeria) 1973 | 7th | 3 | 0 | 0 | 3 | 3 | 7 |
| Total | 1/4 | 3 | 0 | 0 | 3 | 3 | 7 |

== Honours ==
=== Regional ===
- CECAFA Cup
  - (gold) Champions (3): 1974, 1994, 2010
  - (silver) Runners-up (5): 1973, 1980, 1981, 1992, 2002
  - (bronze) Third place (4): 1975^{s}, 1979, 1990, 2008
- COSAFA Cup
  - (bronze) Third place (1): 2017

=== Friendly ===
- Gossage Cup / Challenge Cup (5): 1949, 1950, 1951, 1964, 1965

Notes

- ^{s} Shared titles.
