= Yannick Pandor =

Footballer (born 2001)

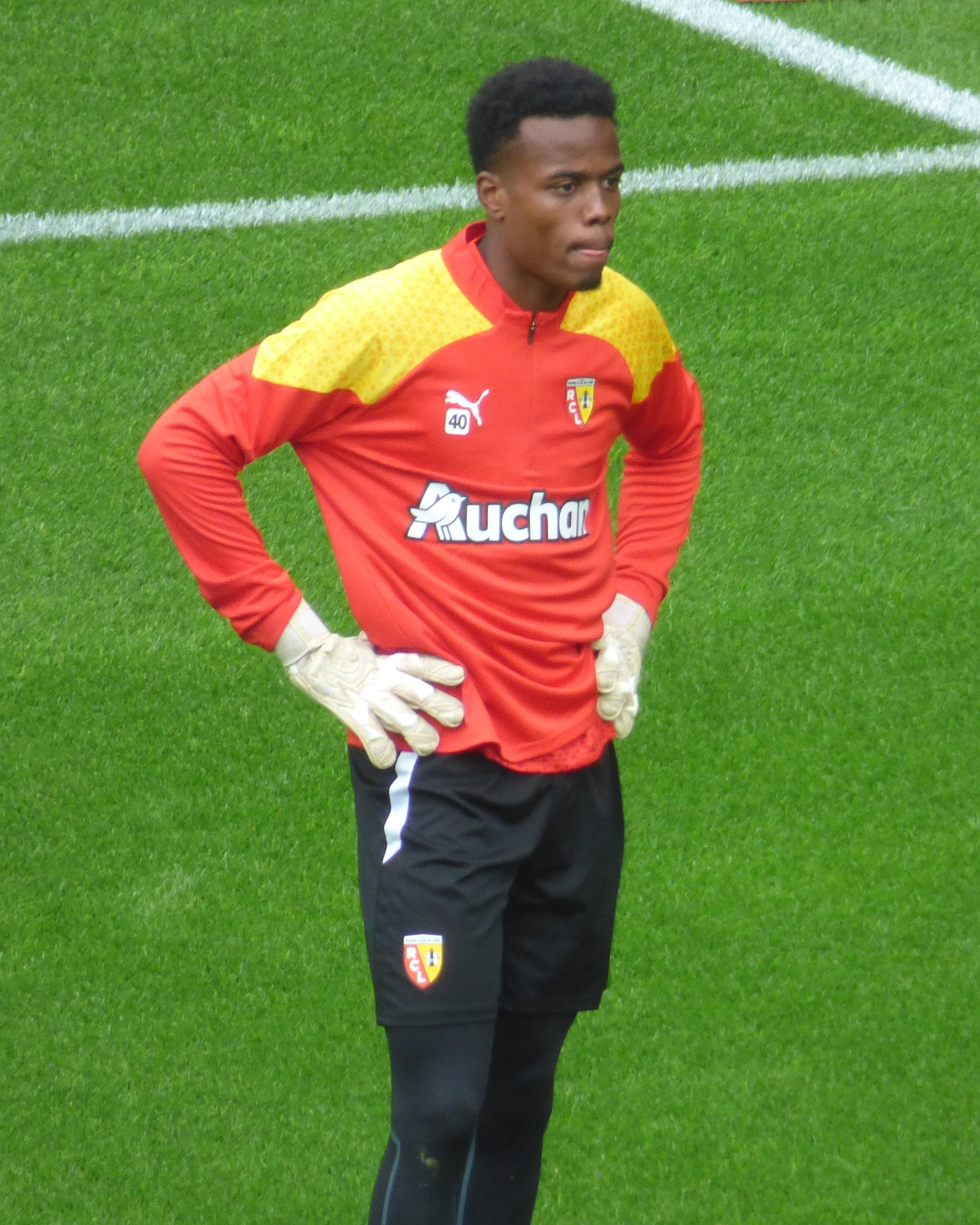
- Pandor with Lens in 2023

Personal information
- Date of birth: 1 May 2001 (age 25)
- Place of birth: Marseille, France
- Height: 1.92 m (6 ft 4 in)
- Position: Goalkeeper

Team information
- Current team: Amiens
- Number: 40

Youth career
- 2007–2012: US Michelis
- 2012–2017: Marseille
- 2017–2018: SC Bel Air

Senior career*
Years	Team	Apps	(Gls)
2018–2024	Lens B	63	(0)
2021–2026	Lens	0	(0)
2024–2025	→ Boulogne (loan)	30	(0)
2025–2026	→ Francs Borains (loan)	27	(0)
2026–	Amiens	0	(0)

International career^{‡}
2022	Comoros U20	11	(0)
2022–	Comoros	17	(0)
- * Club domestic league appearances and goals as of 20 April 2026 ‡ National team caps and goals as of 21 January 2026

Yannick Pandor (French pronunciation: [janik pɑ̃dɔʁ]; born 1 May 2001) is a professional footballer who plays as a goalkeeper for Ligue 3 club Amiens. Born in France, he plays for the Comoros national team.

== Club career ==
Pandor is product of the youth academies of Michelis, Marseille and Bel Air. He started his career with the reserves of the French club Lens in 2018. On 27 July 2022, he signed a professional contract with the club until 2023.

== International career ==
Pandor was born in France to a Martiniquais father and a mother of Malagasy and Comorian descent. He holds French and Comorian nationalities. He represented the Comoros U20s at the 2022 Maurice Revello Tournament. He debuted with the senior Comoros national team in a friendly 2–1 win over Ethiopia on 25 March 2022.

On 11 December 2025, Pandor was called up to the Comoros squad for the 2025 Africa Cup of Nations.

== Personal life ==
Pandor's cousins Yannis and Ehsan Kari are also professional footballers.
