= Hersi Said =

Tanzanian football executive

Member of FIFA Club Competition Committee
- Incumbent
- Assumed office 7 October 2025
- President: Gianni Infantino

Chairman of Africans Club Association
- Incumbent
- Assumed office 2023

President of Young Africans
- Incumbent
- Assumed office 2022
- Preceded by: Mshindo Msolla

Personal details
- Born: Hersi Ally Said; 27 July 1984 (age 41) Dodoma, Tanzania
- Citizenship: Tanzania
- Children: 4
- Education: Dar es Salaam Institute of Technology; (BEng)
- Occupation: Football administrator; Businessman
- Website: hersisaid.tz

Hersi Ally Said (born 27 July 1984) is a Tanzanian businessman and football administrator. Since 2022, he has been president of Young Africans. He is the co-founder and chairman of Africans Club Association.

== Early life and education ==
Hersi was born in Mpwapwa, Dodoma on 27 July 1984. His parents moved to Dar es Salaam when he was still young age. He attended Kisarawe Primary School in Dar es Salaam and Hijra Seminary Secondary School in Dodoma.

He earned a full technician certificate in civil engineering, a Engineer's degree and a Bachelor of Engineering at the Dar es Salaam Institute of Technology (DIT), He also Postgraduate in telecommunications from South Africa and oil and gas from England.

== Personal life ==
Hersi is married and has four children, three daughters and one son.
