= Dickson Job =

Tanzanian footballer

Personal information
- Full name: Dickson Nickson Job
- Date of birth: 29 December 1998 (age 27)
- Place of birth: Morogoro, Tanzania
- Height: 1.68 m (5 ft 6 in)
- Position: Centre-back

Team information
- Current team: Young Africans
- Number: 5

Senior career*
Years	Team	Apps	(Gls)
2017–2021	Mtibwa Sugar		
2021–	Young Africans		

International career^{‡}
2021–	Tanzania	43	(1)
- * Club domestic league appearances and goals as of 05:28, 24 March 2022 (UTC) ‡ National team caps and goals as of 23:25, 16 June 2026 (UTC)

Dickson Nickson Job (born 29 December 2000) is a Tanzanian professional footballer who plays as a centre-back for Tanzanian Premier League club Young Africans and the Tanzania national team.

== Club career ==
Job began his senior career in the Tanzanian Premier League with Mtibwa Sugar. He joined Young Africans on 11 January 2021.

== International career ==
Job made his senior debut with the Tanzania national team in a friendly 2–1 loss to Kenya on 15 March 2021.

=== International goals ===
Scores and results list Tanzania's goal tally first.

No.	Date	Venue	Opponent	Score	Result	Competition
1.	30 July 2022	Benjamin Mkapa National Stadium, Dar es Salaam, Tanzania	Somalia	2–1	2–1	2022 African Nations Championship qualification
