= Paul Bassey =

Nigerian sports journalist

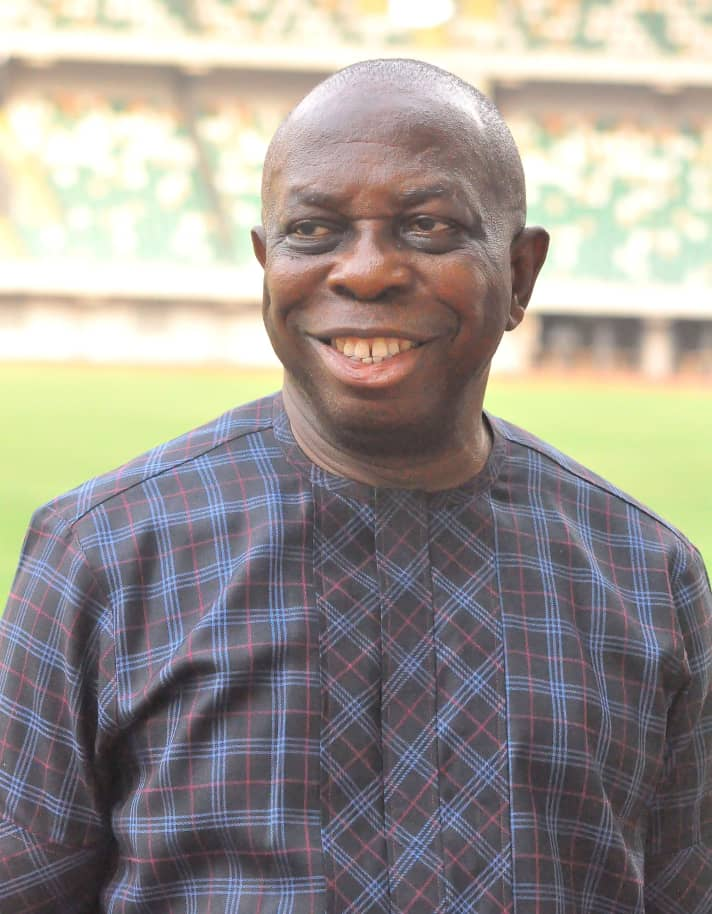
- Paul Bassey at Godswill Akpabio Stadium on 18 February 2022

Commissioner for Sports, Akwa Ibom State
- Incumbent
- Assumed office 25 February 2025
- Preceded by: Monday Uko

Vice-chairperson of Africans Club Association
- Incumbent
- Assumed office 30 November 2023

Chairman of Akwa United
- In office 1 March 2016 – 24 February 2025
- Preceded by: Nse Ubeh

Personal details
- Born: 9 July 1958 (age 68) Eket, Akwa Ibom
- Education: University of Calabar
- Profession: Journalist, Sports administrator

Paul Bassey (born 9 July 1958) is a Nigerian sports journalist and sports administrator. He is also the Commissioner for Sports, Akwa Ibom.

== Personal life ==
Paul Bassey is married to Helen. He has three children. He is a Christian and an ordained Elder of The Apostolic Church Nigeria. On 28 March 2020, his second son, Enoabasi Paul Bassey, got married in Lagos.

=== Education ===
Bassey had his primary school education at Saint Gregory's primary School Ikot Ebok, Eket (1964 to 1967) and Salvation Army Primary School Iyun Road, Lagos (1967 to 1969).

After his primary school education, he proceeded to Saint Finbarr's College, Akoka, Lagos, for his secondary school education in 1970 and obtained his Senior Secondary School Certificate in 1975.

In 1983, he earned a Bachelor of Arts degree in Modern Languages and Linguistics from the University of Calabar.

Two years later, he obtained a Masters of Arts degree from the University of Grenoble, France.

== Career ==
=== Sports journalism ===
Bassey began his sports journalism career as a reporter and writer for Nigerian Chronicle newspaper in 1977. He was promoted to the rank of sports editor four years later. In 1986, Bassey joined The Punch Newspapers as a sports editor. Five years later, Champion Newspapers appointed him the group sports editor and he was later promoted to the position of deputy general manager.

He left Champion Newspapers to establish a daily sports paper, Today Sports, a publication of DP Communications Ltd., with its corporate headquarters and publishing house in Ikeja, Lagos. He was the editor-in-chief of the daily national sports newspaper, now defunct.

Bassey anchored one of the popular Nigeria Television Sports programmes on NTA, Master Sports.

=== Sports administration ===
==== Official assignments ====
Bassey has served as a member of the NFF Technical and Development Committee. He works as a lead resource person during the NFF Pre-season match commissioners' seminar.

Bassey served as FIFA Match Commissioner for the 2014 FIFA World Cup qualifying match between Algeria and Burkina Faso at the Mustapha Tchaker Stadium, Blida on Tuesday, 19 November 2013.

On 30 November 2013 Bassey was on duty as CAF General Coordinator for the second leg of the 10th CAF Confederation Cup final between TP Mazembe of Democratic Republic of Congo and Tunisian club, Club Sportive Sfaxien, at the Stade TP Mazembe, Lubumbashi.

In 2014, CAF appointed Bassey into a five-member expert committee to inspect the six countries who were bidding to host the 2019 and 2021 Africa Cup of Nations, following a decision reached by CAF’s Executive Committee at its meeting in Cairo, Egypt.

On 5 February 2015, Bassey was designated by CAF as the security officer on duty in the second semi-final of the Equatorial Guinea 2015 Africa Cup of Nations involving Ghana and the host, Equatorial Guinea.

In November 2015, Bassey was appointed by FIFA to commission the 2018 FIFA World Cup qualifier involving Congo and Ethiopia in Brazzaville.

In 2016, CAF appointed Bassey as instructor on CAF Competitions Management System at the CAF Match commissioners seminar held in Cairo, Egypt, from 11 to 17 July.

On 9 October 2016, Bassey was the FIFA official in charge of Security for the 2018 FIFA World Cup qualifier between Congo and Egypt in Brazzaville.

On 23 October 2016, Bassey served as CAF General Coordinator during the second leg of the 2016 CAF Champions League Final at the Borg El Arab Stadium, Egypt.

In October 2016, CAF appointed Bassey and four other Nigeria sport administrators – including the LMC chief operating officer, Salihu Abubakar, former NFF President, Dominic Oneya, NFF General Secretary, Dr. Bolaji Ojo-Oba and Samson Adamu, a CAF Match Coordinator – as instructors for 2017–2019 cycle of CAF Club Licensing.

On 13 November 2016, Bassey was appointed by FIFA as Security Officer for the 2018 FIFA World Cup Group A qualifying match between Guinea and Democratic Republic of Congo, at the 28 September Stadium in Conakry, but the contacted the World football governing body to excuse him from the tie so he could help his state, Akwa Ibom host Nigeria's fixture against Algeria smoothly.

On 18 February 2017, Bassey was the CAF General Coordinator for the 2017 CAF Super Cup match between 2016 CAF Champions League winners Mamelodi Sundowns of South Africa and 2016 CAF Confederation Cup champions, TP Mazembe at the Loftus Versfeld Stadium in Pretoria, South Africa. In March 2023, he was appointed Chairman of the Local Organizing Committee of the NPFL Super 6 tournament sponsored by Dozy Mmobuosi.

==== Akwa United management ====
In 2016, Bassey was appointed by Akwa Ibom State Governor, Udom Gabriel Emmanuel as Senior Special Assistant on Sports and chairman, Akwa United Football Club. Within four years of his administration, the club has been transformed to a big sports brand.

In 2017, under Bassey, Akwa United won their second domestic cup title and recorded their highest ever finish in the Nigerian topflight, placing fourth at the end of the 2016-17NPFL. The following season, the club looked on course to winning their first-ever Nigeria Professional Football League title, but the campaign ended prematurely. As of the time the league season ended, Akwa United were second on the log – just two points behind table-toppers, Lobi Stars.

==== MPN/NNPC Athletics Track and Field Championships ====
Bassey is the project consultant of the Akwa Ibom State MPN/NNPC Track and Field Championship for Secondary Schools, which began in 2001. The annual Athletics Championship has produced track and field talents for Akwa Ibom State, including Aniekeme Alphonsus, who emerged overall best female athlete in the 11th edition in 2011. In 2010, Bassey was the project consultant for the 21st edition of the AFN's All Nigeria Athletics Championship, which was sponsored by MPN/NNPC. The championship – which took place at U. J. Esuene Stadium, Calabar, from 24 to 26 June – served as a qualifier for Kenya 2010 African Athletics Championship and the 19th Commonwealth Games in Delhi, India.

== Honours and recognitions ==
Bassey has been honoured both locally and internationally. He, alongside select few sports personalities, were Nigeria's torch bearers at the 2004 Athens Olympics. In 2007, he was a recipient of CAF Golden Jubilee Award in recognition of his outstanding performance in sports journalism and administration, and overall contribution to the growth of football in Africa, during the CAF 50th anniversary celebration in Cairo.
