= Charles Boniface Mkwasa =

Tanzanian football coach

Boniface Mkwasa
Personal information
- Full name: Charles Boniface Mkwasa
- Date of birth: 10 April 1955 (age 71)
- Place of birth: Morogoro, Tanzania
- Position: Midfielder

International career
| Years | Team | Apps | (Gls) |
| 1980–1984 | Tanzania | 6 | (0) |

Managerial career
- 1989–1993: Tanzania
- 2015-2017: Tanzania

Charles Boniface Mkwasa is a Tanzanian football coach and former footballer who played as a midfielder.

Between June 2015 and January 2017, he was the manager of the Tanzania national football team.
