= Azam TV =

Satellite television service in Africa

- Type: Public
- Industry: Pay television
- Founded: 2013; 13 years ago
- Headquarters: Dar Es Salaam, Tanzania
- Area served: East Africa
- Products: Direct Broadcast Satellite; IPTV
- Services: Cable television; Streaming television
- Owner: Bakhresa Group
- Website: Official website

Azam TV is an East African direct broadcast satellite service owned by Bakhresa Group and based in Dar es salaam, Tanzania. Launched in 2013, the service provides audio, radio and television channels services to subscribers, and encrypted by nagravision. mostly in Tanzania, Malawi, Rwanda, Zimbabwe, Uganda, and Kenya.

== Channels ==
Channels from Azam tv packages consists of four: (Azam Lite - Includes 80+ channels)
(Azam Pure - Offers 85+ channels)
(Azam Plus - Provides 95+ channels)
(Azam Play - Access 130+ channels) Other channels are like kikx, MBC2, MBC3, ZBC

=== Entertainment ===
Channel Name	Channel Number	Format
Azam One	101	16:9 HDTV
Azam Two	102	16:9 HDTV
Sinema Zetu	106	16:9 HDTV
UTV	108	16:9 HDTV

=== Sports ===
Channel Name	Channel Number	Format
Azam Sports 1	111	16:9 HDTV
Azam Sports 2	112	16:9 HDTV
Azam Sports 3	113	16:9 HDTV
Azam Sports 4	114	16:9 HDTV

==== Tanzanian Premier League ====
In 2021, Azam TV secured the broadcasting rights for the Tanzania Mainland Premier League (Tanzanian Premier League) in a deal worth Tsh225.6 billion. The deal gave Azam TV exclusive rights to broadcast the top-tier league for 10 years, following a sponsorship renewal with Tanzania Football Federation.
