= Said Salim Bakhresa =

Tanzanian business tycoon (born 1949)

- Born: 1949 (age 75–76); Zanzibar, Tanzania
- Occupation(s): Businessman, Philanthropist
- Known for: Operating numerous business ventures under Bakhresa Group
- Spouse: Fathiya Bakhresa
- Children: Mohamed Said Salim Bakhresa; Omar Said Salim Bakhresa; Abubakar Said Salim Bakhresa; Mariam Said Salim Bakhresa; Yusuf Said Salim Bakhresa; Khalid Said Salim Bakhresa (deceased 2007)

Said Salim Awadh Bakhresa (born 1949 in Zanzibar), is a Tanzanian business tycoon.

He is the founder and the chairperson of the Bakhresa Group of companies. He is a well-known industrialist in the mainland of Tanzania and the island of Zanzibar. With a humble beginning as a small restaurateur in the seventies, he created the business empire within a span of three decades. At the age of 14, he dropped out of school to become a potato mix salesperson and would later go on to become a successful African businessman. Bakhresa Group; is a conglomerate of various companies and is the largest milling company in East Africa with operations in Tanzania and five other countries.

== Career ==
After getting into the potato mix industry, Bakhresa got involved as a restaurant operator in the 1970s and then went into grain milling. Even today, the main products from Bakhresa's company comes from the Kipawa Flour Mill where various rice and grain products are being processed. The neighboring country of Rwanda is dependent on Bakhresa's mill to provide 120,000 tons of wheat flour per year; which is expected to ease pressure of food prices in a country which approximately 52% of households don't have an adequate level of food security. This is a major concern according to the World Bank's Country Assistance Strategy. Bakhresa's projects in Rwanda are also expected to create jobs and help to increase national corporate tax revenues.

His group employs more than 2000 people and is Tanzania's largest conglomerate. Other specialties produced through Bakhresa's conglomerate includes: confectioneries, frozen foods, various kinds of drinks, and packaging. The Azam brand is Bakhresa's most successful chocolate and ice cream manufacturer in Tanzania. While the company is managed by his sons, Bakhresa owns the company itself. Its daily capacity for manufacturing is 2100 metric tons and made sales of $800 million in 2011. Bakhresa's Azam Marine division is providing international tourists with quick ferry services as more people discover Tanzania. In addition to Zanzibar, riders can also experience Lake Victoria and Mount Kilimanjaro.

Bakhresa is helping to reduce the effects of malaria on his employees by preventing the spread of the disease at his workplaces. As a result, Bakhresa's firm only spends about US$3400 a month for malaria medication as opposed to US$10000 per month to heal its sick workforce. They stopped using Fansidar; a monotherapy drug in favor of more effective artemisinin-based therapies that utilizes polytherapy. Other companies are united with the Bakhresa Group to stop malaria in their region. Residents of Tanzania who work outside of Bakhresa's company have also benefitted from Bakhresa's crusade against malaria in Africa.
