= Mohamed Husseini =

Tanzanian footballer

Mohamed Hussein
Personal information
- Full name: Mohamed Husseini Mohamed
- Date of birth: 1 November 1996 (age 29)
- Place of birth: Tanzania
- Height: 1.69 m (5 ft 7 in)
- Position: Left back

Team information
- Current team: Young Africans
- Number: 15

Senior career*
Years	Team	Apps	(Gls)
2013–2014	Kagera Sugar		
2014–2025	Simba	69	(3)
2025–	Young Africans	4	(1)

International career^{‡}
2015–	Tanzania	31	(1)
- * Club domestic league appearances and goals ‡ National team caps and goals as of 7 November 2025

Mohamed Husseini Mohamed (born 1 November 1996), also known as Zimbwe Jr, is a Tanzanian football player. He plays for Young Africans and the Tanzania national football team.

== International ==
He made his Tanzania national football team debut on 22 November 2015 in a 2015 CECAFA Cup game against Somalia.

He was selected for the 2019 Africa Cup of Nations squad.
