= Nicolas Fontaine (footballer) =

Malagasy footballer (born 2000)

Personal information
- Full name: Nicolas Paul Julien Fontaine
- Date of birth: 7 February 2000 (age 26)
- Place of birth: Ambilly, France
- Height: 1.75 m (5 ft 9 in)
- Position: Winger

Team information
- Current team: Septemvri Sofia
- Number: 17

Youth career
- –2012: AS Cornier
- 2012–2016: Thonon Evian
- 2016–2019: RB Leipzig

Senior career*
Years	Team	Apps	(Gls)
2019–2022	Lyon	0	(0)
2019–2022	→ Lyon B (loan)	19	(1)
2020	→ Las Rozas (loan)	4	(0)
2021	→ Langreo (loan)	5	(0)
2022–2023	Rumilly-Vallières	10	(4)
2023–2024	CS Chênois		
2024	RAAL La Louvière	4	(0)
2025	Lokeren-Temse	11	(0)
2025–	Septemvri Sofia	26	(5)

International career^{‡}
2015–2016	France U16	9	(1)
2017	France U18	3	(0)
2024–	Madagascar	5	(1)
- * Club domestic league appearances and goals as of 26 May 2026 ‡ National team caps and goals as of 29 September 2026

Nicolas Paul Julien Fontaine (born 7 February 2000) is a professional footballer who plays as a winger for Bulgarian First League club Septemvri Sofia. Born in France, he represents the Madagascar national team.

== Early life ==
Fontaine was born on 7 February 2000. Born in Ambilly, France, he is a native of La Roche-sur-Foron, France.

== Club career ==
In 2016, Fontaine joined the youth academy of German Bundesliga side RB Leipzig, where he became friends with France international Dayot Upamecano. Three years later, he signed for French Ligue 1 side Olympique Lyonnais. Subsequently, he was sent on loan to Spanish side Las Rozas CF in 2020, where he made four league appearances and scored zero goals before being sent on loan to Spanish side UP Langreo in 2021, where he made five league appearances and scored zero goals.

Ahead of the 2022–23 season, he signed for French side GFA Rumilly-Vallières, where he made ten appearances and scored four goals. Following his stint there, he signed for Swiss side CS Chênois in 2023. Afterwards, he signed for Belgian side RAAL La Louvière in 2024, where he made four league appearances and scored zero goals. Six months later, he signed for KSC Lokeren-Temse. In August 2025, Fontaine relocated to Bulgaria, signing a contract with First League club Septemvri Sofia.

== International career ==
Fontaine is a Madagascar international. On 11 October 2024, he debuted for the Madagascar national football team during a 1–1 away draw with the Gambia national football team for 2025 Africa Cup of Nations qualification.

=== International goals ===
As of match played 29 September 2026

List of international goals scored by Nicolas Fontaine
No.	Date	Venue	Opponent	Score	Result	Competition
1	29 September 2026	Meknes Honor Stadium, Meknes, Morocco	Tanzania	1–1	1–1	2027 Africa Cup of Nations qualification

== Style of play ==
Fontaine plays as a winger. French news website Foot Mercato wrote in 2020 that he "is explosive and very fast. Versatile, he can be used as a center forward but also as a winger".
