= Bakari Mwamnyeto =

Tanzanian footballer

Personal information
- Full name: Bakari Nondo Mwamnyeto
- Date of birth: 5 October 1995 (age 31)
- Place of birth: Tanzania
- Height: 1.85 m (6 ft 1 in)
- Position: Centre-back

Team information
- Current team: Young Africans
- Number: 3

Senior career*
Years	Team	Apps	(Gls)
2018–2020	Coastal Union		
2020–	Young Africans		

International career^{‡}
2019–	Tanzania	26	(0)
- * Club domestic league appearances and goals as of 05:28, 24 March 2022 (UTC) ‡ National team caps and goals as of 23:15, 10 September 2022 (UTC)

Bakari Nondo Mwamnyeto (born 5 October 1995) is a Tanzanian professional footballer who plays as a centre-back for Tanzanian Premier League club Young Africans and the Tanzania national team.

== Club career ==
Mwamnyeto began his senior career with Coastal Union in the Tanzanian Premier League, eventually becoming their captain. He then joined Young Africans on 14 August 2020.

== International career ==
Mwamnyeto made his senior debut with the Tanzania national team in a friendly 0–0 tie with Rwanda on 14 October 2019. He was part of the squad called up to the 2020 African Nations Championship.

On 29 March 2026, he scored his first senior goal in a 6–0 victory against Macau.

== International goals ==
No.	Date	Venue	Opponent	Score	Result	Competition
1.	29 March 2026	Kigali Pelé Stadium, Kigali, Rwanda	Macau	2–0	6–0	2026 FIFA Series
