= Mwenge, Dar es Salaam =

Neighborhood in Kijitonyama ward of Kinondoni District of Dar es Salaam, Tanzania

Coordinates: 6.7708°S 39.2292°E

Mwenge
- Neighborhood
- Interactive map of Mwenge
- Country: Tanzania
- Region: Dar es Salaam
- District: Kinondoni District
- District: Kijitonyama
- Time zone: UTC+3 (EAT)
- Area code: 022
- Website: City Website

Mwenge is a neighborhood of Kijitonyama ward in Kinondoni District of Dar es Salaam Region in Tanzania, located 8 km northwest of the Dar es Salaam central business district around the intersection of Bagamoyo Road and Sam Nujoma Road.

Mwenge neighborhood is especially known for the large Makonde community, whose artisan crafts market where ebony sculptures and other crafts are sold. The market is a major tourist attraction of Dar es Salaam. Several shops have adjacent workshops where visitors are invited to watch Makonde sculptors at work.

Mwenge is one of the main daladala (share taxi) stations of Dar es Salaam; uncountable daladalas go back and forth from Mwenge to the Dar es Salaam central business district), as well as other destinations, throughout the day. Meridian has made a contribution to small businesses at Mwenge and Mbagala by donating big umbrellas, providing needed shade and protection for local entrepreneurs.
