= Mohamed Doumbia =

Ivorian footballer (born 1998)

Personal information
- Date of birth: 25 December 1998 (age 27)
- Place of birth: Abidjan, Ivory Coast
- Height: 1.75 m (5 ft 9 in)
- Position: Midfielder

Youth career
- Majestic

Senior career*
Years	Team	Apps	(Gls)
2017	Ekenäs IF	26	(1)
2018–2022	Dukla Prague	77	(7)
2022–2024	Slovan Liberec	42	(5)
2025–	Majestic	0	(0)
- * Club domestic league appearances and goals as of 2 June 2024

Mohamed Doumbia (born 25 December 1998) is an Ivorian professional footballer who plays as a midfielder for Young Africans in the Tanzanian Premier League.

== Career ==
Doumbia started his youth career at Majestic FC in the Ivory Coast. He made his senior league debut for Finnish club Ekenäs IF on 6 May 2017 in a 2–0 home loss to FF Jaro in second-tier Ykkönen.

He signed for Czech First League side Dukla Prague in December 2017 for an undisclosed fee. He started making regular appearances in the starting lineup after the arrival of coach Roman Skuhravý in September 2018, who praised Doumbia's tactical awareness as his main strength. After spending four years at Dukla, Doumbia joined Slovan Liberec in February 2022, signing a contract until June 2024.

== Career statistics ==
As of 11 May 2024.

Appearances and goals by club, season and competition
Club	Season	League			National cup (Note: Includes Suomen Cup and Czech Cup)		Continental		Other		Total	
Club	Season	Division	Apps	Goals	Apps	Goals	Apps	Goals	Apps	Goals	Apps	Goals
Ekenäs IF	2017	Ykkönen	26	1	1	0	–		–		27	1
Dukla Prague	2017–18	Czech First League	4	0	–		–		–		4	0
Dukla Prague	2018–19	Czech First League	17	0	2	0	–		–		19	0
Dukla Prague	2019–20	FNL	29	4	4	0	–		–		33	4
Dukla Prague	2020–21	FNL	24	3	1	0	–		–		25	3
Dukla Prague	2021–22	FNL	3	0	2	0	–		–		5	0
Dukla Prague	Total		77	7	9	0	0	0	0	0	86	7
Slovan Liberec B	2021–22	ČFL	8	0	–		–		–		8	0
Slovan Liberec B	2023–24	ČFL	1	0	–		–		–		1	0
Slovan Liberec B	Total		9	0	–	–	–	–	–	–	9	0
Slovan Liberec	2021–22	Czech First League	1	0	–		–		–		1	0
Slovan Liberec	2022–23	Czech First League	20	3	1	0	–		–		21	3
Slovan Liberec	2023–24	Czech First League	21	2	3	0	–		–		24	2
Slovan Liberec	Total		42	5	4	0	–	–	–	–	46	5
Majestic	2024–25	Burkinabé Premier League	0	0	0	0	–		–		0	0
Career total			154	13	14	0	0	0	0	0	168	13
