= Mwenge =

County in the Western Region of Uganda

Coordinates: 0°51′N 33°57′E

Kyenjojo District in Uganda

Mwenge is a traditional administrative division (county) of the Kyenjojo district located in western region of Uganda. It makes up the western half of the district. It contains twelve sub-counties and four town councils, namely:

- Butunduzi
- Katooke
- Kyarusozi
- Kyenjojo

== Structure of Mwenge ==
The county is part of the Tooro sub-region nd falls under the Tooro Kingdom. It is split into three (3);

- Mwenge North; bordered by Kibaale District to the north.
- Mwenge Central; located in the central part of Kyenjojo District.
- Mwenge South; bordered by Kamwenge District to the southwest.

== Sub-Counties ==
- Butiiti
- Bugaki
- Bufunjo
- Katooke
- Kyarusozi
- Matiri
- Nyabuharwa
- Kigaraale
- Butunduuzi
- Kyembogo
- Kihuura
- Barahiija

== Demography and geography ==
Population; From the 2024 National Population and Housing Census data, Mwenge county had approximately 415,076 people across 98,101 households.

Culture; The primary language spoken is Rutooro and the majority tribe is Batooro, though Bakiga and Banyakole also reside in the area.

Toponymy; The name "Mwenge" means "banana beer", a common product of this region. This explain why it is called so.

== Political Updates. ==
Mwenge North; On 9th December, 2025, incumbent Member of Parliament, David Muhumuza officially withdrew his candidacy for 2026 parliamentary elections to promote unity within the National Resistance Movement party.

Mwenge South; The constituency is currently represented by Donald Katalihwa, a member of NRM.

Mwenge Central; Recent local news indicates political activity surrounding potential candidates such as Doreen Nyanjura.

== Local highlights. ==
Sports; Mwenge South is the champion of the Tooro Kingdom Masanza cup, having secured the title in August 2023 with a victory over Mwenge North.

== See also ==
- Districts of Uganda
- Counties of Uganda
