= Mshindo Msolla =

Tanzanian professional football manager

Personal information
- Place of birth: Tanzania

Managerial career
- Years: Team
- 2001–2002: Taifa Stars
- 2002–2003: Tanzania
- Taifa Stars

Mshindo Msolla is a Tanzanian professional football manager. Until 2002 he coached the club Taifa Stars. From October 2002 to July 2003 he led the Tanzania national football team. Then he again coached the club Taifa Stars.
