= Azam F.C. =

Association football club in Tanzania

Azam FC
- Full name: Azam Football Club
- Nicknames: Wana Lambalamba Chamazi Millionaires, The Bakers
- Founded: 23 July 2004; 22 years ago
- Ground: Chamazi Stadium; Dar es Salaam, Tanzania
- Capacity: 10,000
- Owner: Bakhresa Group
- Chairman: Nassor Idrisa
- Coach: Florent Ibengé
- League: Tanzanian Premier League
- 2025–26: Tanzanian Premier League, 3rd of 16
- Website: www.azamfc.co.tz
Home colours	Away colours	Third colours

Azam Football Club is a Tanzanian professional football club based in Chamazi, Temeke, Dar es Salaam, Tanzania, that competes in the Tanzanian Premier League. Nicknamed Wana Lambalamba, Chamazi Millionaires or the Bakers, the club was founded as Mzizima Football Club in 2004, changed its name to Azam Sports Club in 2005, then Azam Football Club in 2006 and moved to its current stadium, Azam Complex Chamazi, in 2010.

Azam FC have won 10 trophies; one Premier League, a record 5 Mapinduzi Cups, two Kagame Cups, one Tanzania FA Cup and one Community Shield.

In the 2013/14 season, Azam FC won the league unbeaten, and by so doing, the club became only the second (after Simba SC 2009/10) to win the league without losing a single game.

Azam FC were undefeated in the league (26 matches) in a run that stretched to a 38 games, from the 18th round of 2012/13 season to the 4th round of 2014/15. In 2015, the club became the first in the history of Tanzanian clubs to win the Kagame Cup without conceding a goal.

Azam FC is one of the most widely supported football clubs in Tanzania, and has rivalries with Yanga SC, Simba SC, Mtibwa Sugar FC and African Lyon.

== Performance in CAF competitions ==
- CAF Confederation Cup: 1 appearance:

2025–26 – Group Stage
2026–27 – Group Stage

== History ==
=== Early years (2004–2005) ===
Azam FC, started as Mzizima FC on 23 July 2004. The club was founded by the workers of Mzizima wheat flour milling industry owned by Said Salim Bakhresa,(SSB) group of Companies, at Banda la Ngozi, Nyerere Road, Ilala, Dar es Salaam.

Mzizima FC was a brainchild of Hafidh Salim (who became the first Chairperson), Ali Mlungula, Seif Mshamu Kiwile, Athuman Kikila, Mohamed Saad Makununi, Mzee Chuli Ramadhan, and Babu Ayubu. Then they were joined by Abubakar Mapwisa, Seleman Mabehewa, Twalib Suleiman Chuma, Mohamed Seif 'King', Nassor Idrisa 'Father', Ibrahim Jeshi and Abdallah Hassan. They started this team just for recreation and leisure after the long working hours, so as to improve their social life, health and well-being.

They didn't have a place as their training ground thus they approached the Tanzania Railways Limited (TRC) to allow them use their open space at Ilala Goods Shed. TRC gave them a nod and the work of leveling the ground started immediately.

After the ground was ready, they dubbed it, 'Surulele', after the legendary National Stadium, Lagos Nigeria where the Taifa Stars played in at the 1980 African Cup of Nations.

The ground allowed the players, who were the workers, to showcase their talents. The very first players are Nassor Idrisa, Salum Kakolo, Mjomba Akili, Salva Mayola, Ali Dosho, Gabriel Sebastian Manyoronga, Mohamed Kikuni, Tebela, Zabron Mihangi, Salehe Hillary, Mussa Lumbi, Hatibu Katoto, Amiri Rashid Kikwa, Hamis Jafar, Ibrahim Jaluo, Abbas Kuka, Mbaraka Shaaban Jangama 'Cantona', Abdulkarim Amin 'Popat', Hassan Jeba, Said Nachikongo, Mussa Juma, Faraj Ismail, Mazaila Athuman and James Adriano Kilongola.

=== Champions of Ilala 2005 ===
After only playing friendly matches, in 2005, Mzizima FC participated in official league after joining division four. This was the lowest official league in Tanzanian football pyramid, and organized by the respective districts' football associations. Based in Ilala district of Dar es Salaam, Mzizima FC joined the Ilala District League under Ilala District Football Association, which was played in May, from 1st to 28th, at Benjamin Mkapa Secondary School ground, Ilala, Dar es Salaam.

Mzizima FC made it to the final and saw off Ndanda FC of Misheni Kota, Kariakoo Dar es Salaam by 2–1, with the brace from Mussa Lumbi in front of Honourable Mussa Hassan Mussa, the Ilala Member of Parliament.

Mr. Abubabar Bakhresa, the Managing Director of SSB, awarded the team a sum of 330,000/= for winning the championship.

The win meant Mzizima FC was automatically promoted to Dar es Salaam regional league (division three) for the 2006 season.

=== Azam Sports Club ===
Other SSB owned industries had their own football teams too, and in 2005 they agreed to merger with Mzizima SC to form one strong team following the suggestion from Mr. Abubabar Bakhresa, the Managing Director of SSB. The teams were Kipawa [Biscuits & Bakery Industry], TAZARA - Buguruni [Wheat Flour Milling & Mineral Water Industry] and Vingunguti [Omary Packaging & Garage].

They decided to organize the tournament involving all these teams to help select the players to form one new team. The tournament was played at Airwing ground in Ukonga. Mzizima FC and Kipawa FC qualified for the final but the match was interrupted as Kipawa confronted the officiating.

After the disputed tournament, every team maintained its status but later some players defected from other teams to join Mzizima FC to honour the call of Mr. Abubakar Bakhresa. Some of them were Luckson Kakolaki and Id Abubakary of Kipawa. This led to the strengthening of Mzizima SC and weakening of other teams, and lately they swallowed their pride and agreed to merger with Mzizima FC to form one team.

On 28/10/2005, the newly formed team adopted the new name, Azam Sports Club, because Azam is the flagship name for the SSB group of companies.

=== Azam Football Club 2006 ===
After winning the Ilala District Championship (division four) in 2005, Azam SC was automatically promoted to the Dar es Salaam regional league (division three). But the regional league proved to be a bit tough for Azam SC players who were workers from within the company.

The need to improve the team forced the recruitment of new players from outside the company. The new players helped the team to win promotion to second division for 2007 season. But that was the beginning of the new era because the club now started to pay wages to the players only for playing football, thus the professionalization of the club.

On June 6, 2006, Azam Sports Club turned full professional and marked the evolution by dropping 'Sports Club' from its name, and replaced it with 'Football Club'. From that day on, the official name of the club is Azam Football Club.

The players recruited for 2007 season were Seleman Matola, Shekhan Rashid, Kasimu Kilungo, Juma Assey, Daud Jumanne, James Adrian, Makame Usi 'Vigema', Boniface Pawasa, Heri pazi, and Alimu Chilumbe. Others were Kamba Luffo and Steven Nyenge.

These were the players who had vast experience of local and international football and improved the team.

=== Promotion to Premier League ===
In April 2006, the Tanzania Football Federation (TFF) announced that from 2007 they will change the league system and calendar. The old calendar of January - December was to be replaced by the new one of August - May. So to get the representatives in African competitions for 2007 (as CAF still used February - November calendar), TFF organized what they called the LIGI NDOGO (mini league).

Also all other leagues below premier league to be disbanded and replaced by new competition called National League. This competition was to start from district level to the national level in the same season. National level is where the promotion to the premier league was obtained. Under this new format, the team could be formed the same season and got promoted to the premier league in the same season.

So when the new season started, Azam FC which at the time was in division two, had to drop to district level to participate in this new competition. They started from Ilala District and in one of their matches they played against Cosmopolitan and lost 2–0, at Benjamin Mkapa Secondary School ground. All goals were scored by the 17 year old, John Bocco.

Azam FC who eventually managed to qualify for regional level, signed John Bocco and enrolled him for the rest of the season. They too signed a 16 year old Salum Abubakary 'Sure Boy'.

Azam FC triumphantly made it all the way to National level for promotion playoffs. There were two centers for playoffs, Dodoma and Musoma, and Azam FC was in Dodoma.

Their group included Mbagala Market, the team which had a 17 year old in Mbwana Samatta, Majimaji FC and Kijiweni FC from Uyole Mbeya. The match against Mbagala Market which ended in a stalemate was very intense and a reminder of the two previous encounters at regional, all ended in a draw.

This is where the rivalry between Azam FC and Mbagala Market started. Mbagala Market, now African Lyon, is the first team to beat Azam FC at Azam Complex Chamazi.

Azam FC was promoted after accumulating 7 points from two wins (3–0 against Kijiweni and 2–0 against Majimaji) and one draw (0-0 against Mbagala Market).

The promotion was officially sealed on July 27, 2008, after a comfortable 2–0 win over Majimaji FC with free kick goals from John Bocco.

Since promotion, Azam FC have managed to finish in top three in all seasons, except 2008/09 [eighth] and 2016/17 [fourth].

== Colours and badge ==
Azam Football Club uses White, Blue and Orange Colors

== Achievements ==
- Tanzanian Premier League Champions (1 title)
  - 2014; 12 years ago
    - 2013–14
- CECAFA Club Championship (2 titles)
  - 2015; 11 years ago
    - 2015
  - 2018; 8 years ago
    - 2018
- Mapinduzi Cup (5 titles)
  - 2012; 14 years ago
    - 2012
  - 2013; 13 years ago
    - 2013
  - 2017; 9 years ago
    - 2017
  - 2018; 8 years ago
    - 2018
  - 2019; 7 years ago
    - 2019

== Players ==
For a list of every Azam FC player and every Azam captain, see List of Azam F.C. players

== Managerial history ==
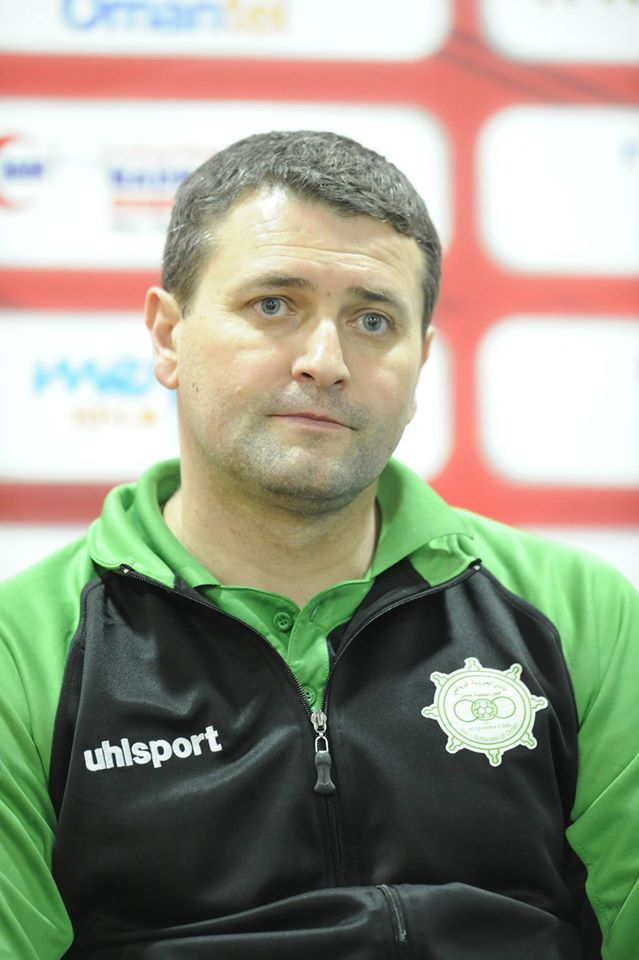
Aristică Cioabă became the manager of Azam FC in 2017

See also: List of Azam F.C. coaches

- (Tanzania) Athuman Kikila [2004]
- (Tanzania) Mohamed Seif 'King' [2004–2008]
- (Brazil) Neidar Dos Santos [2008–09]
- (Tanzania) Sylvester Marsh (Caretaker) [2009]
- (Brazil) Itamar Amorin [2009–10]
- (Tanzania) Sylvester Marsh (Caretaker) [2010]
- (England) Stewart John Hall [2010–12]
- (India) Vivek Nagul (Caretaker) [2012]
- (Serbia) Boris Bunjak [2012]
- (England) Stewart John Hall [2012–13]
- (Cameroon) Joseph Omog [2013–2015]
- (Uganda) George 'Best' Nsimbe (Interim coach) [2015]
- (England) Stewart John Hall [2015–2016]
- (Tanzania) Dennis Kitambi (Caretaker) [2016]
- (Spain) Zeben Hernandez [2016]
- (Tanzania) Idd Nassor Cheche (Caretaker) [2016]
- (Romania) Aristică Cioabă [2017–2018]
- (Tanzania) Idd Nassor Cheche (Caretaker) [2018]
- (Netherlands) Hans van der Pluijm [2018–2019]
- (Tanzania) Meja Mstaafu Abdul Mingange (Interim coach) [2019]
- (Burundi) Etienne Ndayiragije [2019]
- (Romania) Aristică Cioabă [2019–2020]
- (Zambia) George Lwandamina [2020-2021]
- (United States) Abdihamid Moallin (Care Taker) [2021]
- (United States) Abdihamid Moallin (Head Coach) [2022]
- (England) Mohamed Badru (Caretaker - only one match vs Yanga) [2022]
- (France) Dennis Jean Lavagne [2022]
- (England) Kalimangonga Ongala (Caretaker) [2022]
- (Senegal) Youssoupha Dabo (Head Coach) [2023-]

== CEOs ==
- (Tanzania) Saad Kawemba Byemba (2014–2017)
- (Tanzania) Abdul Mohamed (2017–2018)
- (Tanzania) Abdulkarim MohamedAmin Nurdin 'Popat' (2018–present)

== Media officers ==
- (Tanzania) Jaffary Iddy Maganga (2009–2020)
- (Tanzania) Zaka Zakazi (2020–2023)
- (Tanzania) Hasheem Ibwe (2023–present)
