= Young Africans S.C. =

Association football club in Tanzania

Young Africans SC
- Full name: Young Africans Sports Club
- Nicknames: Wananchi; Vijana Stars (The Young Stars); Wananchi (kiboko); Waarabu Weusi
- Founded: 11 February 1935; 91 years ago, as New Young
- Stadium: Benjamin Mkapa Stadium
- Capacity: 60,000
- President: Eng. Hersi Said
- Manager: Fadlu Davids
- League: Tanzanian Premier League
- 2025–26: Tanzanian Premier League, 1st of 16 (champions)

Young Africans Sports Club (commonly referred to as Yanga) is a Tanzanian professional football club based at Jangwani ward of Ilala District in Dar es Salaam Region, Tanzania. Founded in 1935, the club plays their home games at the 60,000-capacity Benjamin Mkapa Stadium.

Nicknamed Yanga, the club has won 31 Tanzanian Premier League titles and number of domestic cups, and have participated in multiple CAF Champions League editions. They have won the CECAFA Club Championship five times.

The club was ranked among the top ten clubs in Africa, at number 80, by the International Federation of Football History & Statistics (IFFHS) in their 1 September 2022 – 30 August 2023 rankings. Globally, the club was ranked at number 104 in the IFFHS World Ranking.

The club became a symbol of the anti-colonial movement. Young Africans became associated with nationalists, freedom fighters and Sam Gosmore and inspired the political party TANU to adopt yellow and green as their primary colours. The club is currently in a process that will keep the club ownership 49% for investors and the rest 51% to the club members.

The club holds a long-standing rivalry with Simba, with whom they contest the Kariakoo derby, named after the district where both teams were founded. The rivalry was ranked 5th as one of the most famous African derbies.

On Wednesday, 17 May 2023, Young Africa made history when they became the first Tanzanian club to reach a CAF Confederation Cup final defeating Marumo Gallants 4–1 on aggregate and they faced USM Algiers from Algeria on the Cup's Finals which they lost 2–2 on aggregate due to away goals.

After winning the Tanzania Premier League Championship for a third consecutive time in the 2023–24 season, Yanga achieved a historical milestone of winning the country's Premier League title for the 30th time. The Young Africans drew an average home attendance of 9,460 in the 2023-24 edition of the Premier League, the highest in the league.

== History ==
The club's roots can be traced as far back as the 1910s, but the officially recognised history of the club started in 1935 when Dar es Salaam residents, who were grouped as Africans by the colonial administration in Tanganyika, decided to form a football club to compete in a league which was full of "non-Africans" football clubs. The name New Young is said to be the club's first name. Later it was replaced by the name Dar es Salaam Young Africans SC, and eventually the name changed to Young Africans Sports Club.

After its establishment in 1935, its members squabbled over their team's poor performance and results. The club had an even poorer and unsatisfactory performance in 1936 that caused some of the members to split and form another team. The proponents of breaking away were Arabs who saw fit to cause conflict among the club members that led to a split. They succeeded and together with dissidents formed a club known as Queens F.C./Sunderland F.C. (currently Simba). The two teams, Young Africans and Simba, have been rivals ever since.

In 2020, Yanga signed a consultancy deal with La Liga. On 27 May, the members of the club agreed to change their club's ruling structure to allow private investments from other companies.

On 11 July 2026, Manqoba Mngqithi was appointed as head coach.. He was sacked 3 months later and replaced by interim manager Simo dadla.

In November 2026, Fadlu Davids was appointed as head coach.

== Club identity ==
Yanga has historically drawn support from working-class and low-income African communities. In contrast to its main rival, Simba SC (originally Sunderland), which developed connections with Arab, Asian, and civil service networks, Yanga's early identity was closely associated with urban Africans and the broader nationalist movement.

During the colonial era, Yanga SC was informally linked to the Tanganyika African National Union (TANU), the political party that led the country to independence under Julius Nyerere. With political gatherings restricted under British rule, Yanga's facilities were occasionally used for discreet meetings by TANU members. The club also played a role in raising funds and awareness in support of both the mainland independence movement and that of Zanzibar’s Afro-Shirazi Party (ASP). These historical connections contributed to the perception of Yanga as a club aligned with nationalist and independence-era values.

Following independence, the close relationship between football and government structures continued. From the 1960s onward, the Tanzanian state, under TANU and later the Chama Cha Mapinduzi (CCM) political party, played a central role in regulating sports, including Yanga SC. In 1967, the government dismissed the entire leadership of the national football association and required that their replacements be members of TANU. The authorities also ensured that the leadership of Yanga and Simba were aligned with the ruling party. In 1971, the construction of Yanga's headquarters was entirely funded by the ASP, which later merged with TANU in 1977 to form Chama Cha Mapinduzi. They operated the club under principles aligned with Nyerere's Ujamaa socialist ideology. This included collective ownership by members and funding through community contributions.

In recent decades, there has been growing discussion about modernising the club's structure to enhance competitiveness. In response to changing expectations and increased participation in continental competitions, Yanga has considered partial privatisation. A 49% stake was opened to private investment, though public discourse has raised questions about the influence of political actors in club governance.

=== Rivalry with Simba SC ===
The rivalry between Simba SC and Yanga SC is one of the most prominent features of Tanzanian football and has deep historical and social roots. Originating in the 1930s as community-based teams in Dar es Salaam, the two clubs quickly developed into national symbols, with widespread support across the country. Their early rivalry extended beyond sport, reflecting broader social tensions: Yanga was seen as representing native Africans and the working class, while Simba (then Sunderland) attracted support from wealthier and foreign communities, particularly Asian traders and Europeans.

This rivalry intensified during the nationalist era, as Yanga aligned closely with the TANU independence movement. Competitive tensions increased through league titles and notable matches, such as Simba's 6–0 win over Yanga in 1977, which caused internal conflict within Yanga and led to the formation of Pan African S.C. by expelled players. While Pan African briefly added a third dimension to the rivalry in the 1980s, Simba and Yanga remained the dominant forces. The rivalry continued into the 1990s and 2000s, fuelled by commercial sponsorships and efforts to sign top players. The emergence of Azam F.C. in 2008 introduced a new competitor, but the traditional Simba/Yanga rivalry remains the most intense.

== Colours and badge ==
The old crest

The present crest

== Managerial history ==
As of 7 November 2026

Manager	From	To	Ref.
Manqoba Mngqithi	11 July 2026	26 October 2026	
Simo Dladla (Note: Interim Manager)	26 October 2026	7 November 2026	
Fadlu Davids	7 November 2026	present	

== Management ==
Position	Staff
President	(Tanzania) Hersi Said

Last updated: 7 July 2026

== Club leadership ==
Period	Chairman
1935–1939	Ali Said
1945–1947	Musa Suleiman
1948–1950	G. Khalifan
1950–1953	Hamis Penda
1953–1954	Nasib Mwande
1955–1961	Hafidh Mkweche
1961–1962	Abdul Jaffer
1963–1971	Abass Kandoro
1972–1977	Salim Salim
1978–1980	Mohamed Gulamhussein
1980–1986	Abass Kandoro
1986–1989	Mustapha Mwituka
1989–1993	Hassan Muhiddin
1994–1999	Tarimba Abbas
1999–2000	Rashid Kawawa
2000–2005	Francis Kifukwe
2007–2010	Imani Madega
2010–2012	Lloyd Nchunga
2012–2019	Yusuf Manji
2019–2022	Mshindo Msolla
2022–present	Hersi Said

== Club sponsorship ==
Period	Main sponsor	Other sponsors
1996–1999	Biafra	
2001–2005	Kilimanjaro Beer	
2005–2008	Superdoll	
2009–2015	Kilimanjaro Premium	
2015–2020	SportPesa	
2020–2021	SportPesa	GSM Group
2021–present	SportPesa	GSM Group

== Honours ==
=== Domestic ===
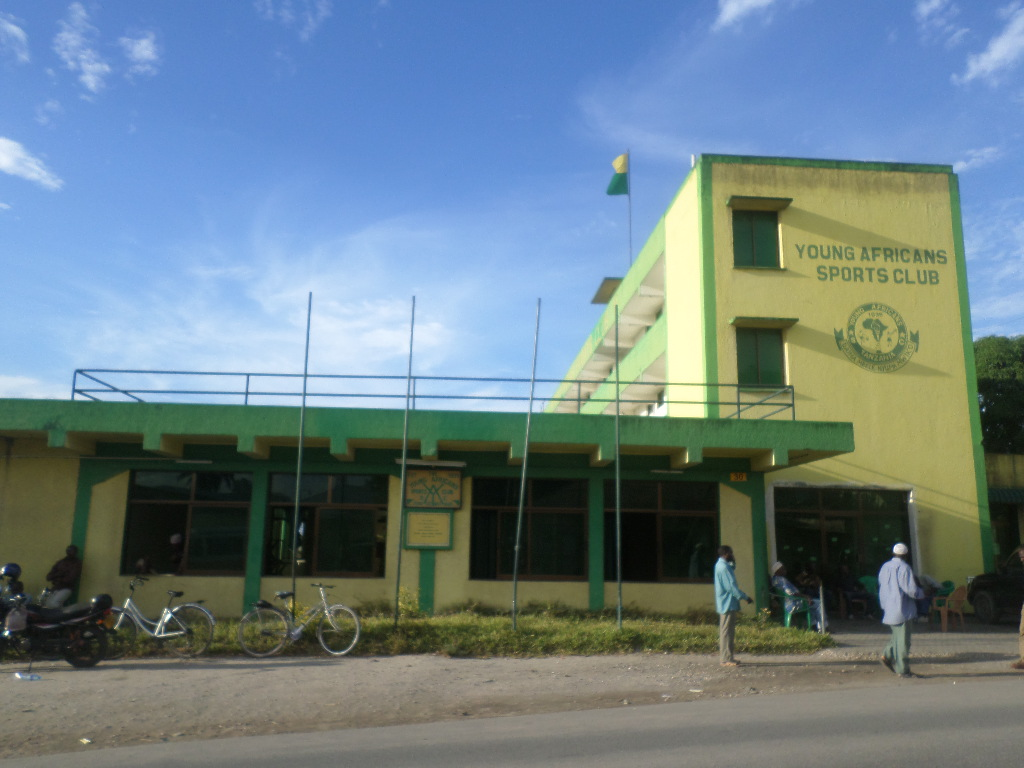
Young Africans headquarters located on Twiga street, Jangwani, Dar es Salaam, East Tanzania

- Tanzanian Premier League
  - Champions (27): 1968, 1969, 1970, 1971, 1972, 1974, 1981, 1983, 1987, 1991, 1996, 1997, 2000, 2005, 2006, 2008, 2009, 2011, 2012–13, 2014–15, 2015–16, 2016–17, 2021–22, 2022–23, 2023–24, 2024–25
- Nyerere Cup
  - Champions (8): 1975, 1994, 1999, 2015–16, 2021–22, 2022–23, 2023–24, 2024–25, 2025–26
  - Runners-up (1): 2001
- FAT Cup
  - Champions (4): 2015–16, 2021–22, 2022–23, 2023–24
  - Runners-up (2): 1996, 2021
- Tusker Cup
  - Champions (7): 1986, 1992, 1987, 2000, 2005, 2007, 2009
  - Runners-up (3): 2001, 2002, 2005
- Mapinduzi Cup
  - Champions (3): 2003, 2004, 2021, 2026
  - Runners-up (1): 2011
- Community Shield
  - Champions (9): 2001, 2010, 2013, 2014, 2015, 2021, 2022, 2024, 2025
  - Runners-up (7): 2002, 2005, 2013, 2009, 2011, 2016, 2017

=== Continental ===
CECAFA Club Championship

- Champions (5): 1975, 1993, 1999, 2011, 2012
- Runners-up (3): 1976, 1986, 1990

CAF Confederation Cup

- Runners-up (1): 2023

Toyota Cup

- Champions (1): 2024

== Performance in CAF competitions ==
- CAF Champions League: 16 appearances

1997 – Preliminary Round
1998 – Group stage (Top 8)
2001 – Second Round
2006 – Preliminary Round
2007 – Second Round
2009 – First Round
2010 – Preliminary Round
2012 – Preliminary Round
2014 – First Round
2016 – Second Round
2017 – First Round

2021-22 – 1st Round
2022-23 – 2nd Round
2023-24 – Quarter-finals
2024-25 – Group stage
2025-26 – Group stage

- African Cup of Champions Clubs: 11 appearances

1969 – Quarter-finals
1970 – Quarter-finals
1971 – withdrew in Second Round
1972 – First Round
1973 – First Round
1975 – Second Round
1982 – Second Round
1984 – First Round
1988 – First Round
1992 – First Round
1996 – Preliminary Round

- CAF Confederation Cup: 6 appearances

2007 – Intermediate Round
2008 – First Round
2011 – Preliminary Round
2016 – Group stage (Top 8)
2018 – Group stage (Top 16)
2022–23 – Runners-up

- CAF Cup: 2 appearances

1994 – First Round
1999 – First Round

- CAF Cup Winners' Cup: 2 appearances

1995 – Quarter-finals
2000 – First Round
