= 2012 CECAFA Cup squads =

The following article lists the squad members of the participating national teams in the 2012 CECAFA Cup, the 36th edition of the CECAFA Cup.

== Group A ==
=== Ethiopia ===
Head coach: (Ethiopia) Seyum Kebede

No.	Pos.	Player	Date of birth (age)	Caps	Club
1	GK	Samson Assefa	1 December 1988 (aged 23)	2	(Ethiopia) Harrar Beer
2	MF	Chala Dereba	15 March 1988 (aged 24)	2	(Ethiopia) Defence
3	DF	Mehari Mena	28 June 1992 (aged 20)	0	Commercial Bank of Ethiopia
4	MF	Yared Zenabu	22 July 1989 (aged 23)	9	(Ethiopia) Saint-George SA
6	MF	Gatoch Panom	30 November 1994 (aged 17)	0	(Ethiopia) Ethiopian Coffee
7	MF	Mesfin Kidane	26 February 1994 (aged 18)	0	(Ethiopia) Saint-George SA
8	DF	Girma Bekele	17 February 1981 (aged 31)	0	(Ethiopia) Awassa City
9	MF	Elias Mamo	9 August 1993 (aged 19)	0	Commercial Bank of Ethiopia
10	FW	Yonathan Kebede	12 August 1991 (aged 21)	0	(Ethiopia) EEPCO
11	MF	Abdulkarim Hassen	22 October 1991 (aged 21)	0	(Ethiopia) EEPCO
12	FW	Abraham Abebe		0	(Ethiopia)
14	MF	Messiud Mohammed	18 February 1990 (aged 22)	6	(Ethiopia) Ethiopian Coffee
15	GK	Binyam Habtamu	13 January 1986 (aged 26)	7	(Ethiopia) Awassa City
16	MF	Tilahun Wolde	4 June 1986 (aged 26)	0	(Ethiopia) Defence
17	FW	Fikru-Teferra Lemessa (c)	24 January 1986 (aged 26)	17	(Vietnam) Thanh Hóa
18	GK	Dereji Elamu			(Ethiopia) Sebeta City
19	DF	Robel Girma	30 June 1994 (aged 18)	0	(Ethiopia) Sidama Coffee
20	DF	Moges Tadesse	28 June 1993 (aged 19)	0	(Ethiopia) Sidama Coffee

=== Kenya ===
Midfielders Paul Were and Kevin Omondi were dismissed from the squad for leaving the team's hotel on the night of 27 November 2012 and not returning until dawn the next morning. A.F.C. Leopards players Bernard Mang'oli and Victor Ochieng were called in as replacements for the two players. However, they were called back to the squad ahead of their semi-final match against Zanzibar due to injuries aggravated by their replacements, Mang'oli and Ochieng.

Head coach: (Kenya) James Nandwa (acting)

No.	Pos.	Player	Date of birth (age)	Caps	Club
1	GK	Duncan Ochieng	31 August 1978 (aged 34)	32	(Kenya) Sofapaka
2	DF	Thomas Wanyama	15 April 1989 (aged 23)	1	(Kenya) Sofapaka
3	DF	Abdallah Juma	4 December 1986 (aged 25)	1	(Kenya) Sofapaka
4	DF	Jockins Atudo	8 August 1985 (aged 27)	13	(Kenya) Tusker
5	FW	Enoch Agwanda	10 April 1994 (aged 18)	1	(Kenya) Sony Sugar
6	MF	Anthony "Muki" Kimani	31 July 1989 (aged 23)	0	(Kenya) Sofapaka
7	MF	Bernard Mang'oli	24 December 1989 (aged 22)	3	(Kenya) Leopards
8	FW	Rama Salim	20 March 1993 (aged 19)	2	(Kenya) Gor Mahia
9	FW	Mike Baraza	17 March 1979 (aged 33)	12	(Kenya) Leopards
10	GK	Martin Musalia		0	(Kenya) Mathare United
11	MF	Paul Were	8 January 1988 (aged 24)	8	(Kenya) Leopards
12	MF	Kevin Omondi	4 August 1990 (aged 22)	13	(Kenya) Gor Mahia
13	MF	Patilah Omoto	2 March 1995 (aged 17)	0	(Kenya) Kariobangi Sharks
14	DF	Anthony "Modo" Kimani (c)	22 April 1983 (aged 29)	12	(Kenya) Mathare United
15	DF	David Owino	5 April 1988 (aged 24)	3	(Kenya) Gor Mahia
16	MF	Humphrey Mieno	25 September 1989 (aged 23)	7	(Kenya) Sofapaka
17	MF	Clifton Miheso	5 February 1993 (aged 19)	4	(Kenya) Thika United
18	MF	David Ochieng	7 October 1992 (aged 20)	0	(Kenya) Tusker
19	FW	Edwin Lavatsa	2 January 1993 (aged 19)	0	(Kenya) Gor Mahia
20	FW	Victor Ochieng	20 March 1987 (aged 25)	2	(Kenya) Leopards

=== South Sudan ===
Head coach: (Serbia) Zoran Đorđević

No.	Pos.	Player	Date of birth (age)	Caps	Club
1	GK	Jumma Genaro	28 February 1982 (aged 29)	1	(Sudan) Al-Hilal Omdurman
2	DF	Zachariah Atinasio	2 July 1990 (aged 21)	0	(Sudan) Al Ahly Shendi Club
3	DF	Martin Suleiman		0	Unattached
4	DF	Miskeen Emmanuel		0	(South Sudan) El Nasir
5	MF	Mong Deng Atit	6 June 1988 (aged 23)	0	(South Sudan) Al-Ahly Renk
6	MF	Emmanuel Manase		0	Unattached
7	DF	Hassein Ismail	4 January 1991 (aged 20)	0	(South Sudan) Kator
8	DF	Villion Silvestre	1 January 1984 (aged 27)	0	Unattached
9	FW	Khamis Leyano (c)	1 January 1987 (aged 24)	1	(South Sudan) Al-Salam
10	MF	Kuzgbour Dak	4 June 1984 (aged 27)	0	(South Sudan) Atlabara
11	FW	James Kone	28 November 1987 (aged 23)	0	(South Sudan) El Nasir
12	GK	Hassan Rafail		0	Unattached
13	DF	Richard Justin	5 October 1979 (age 46)	1	(Sudan) Khartoum NC
14	MF	Adnan Nan	20 November 1979 (aged 32)	0	(South Sudan) El Nasir
15	MF	Simon Amana		0	Unattached
16	MF	Mathew Thomas Jacob	26 February 1986 (aged 25)	0	(South Sudan) Malakia FC
17	DF	Athir Thomas	7 February 1987 (aged 24)	0	(Sudan) Al-Ahli Khartoum
18	DF	Khamis Martin	5 October 1986 (aged 25)	1	(Sudan) Al-Mourada

=== Uganda ===
Head coach: (Scotland) Bobby Williamson

No.	Pos.	Player	Date of birth (age)	Caps	Club
1	GK	Abbey Dhaira	9 September 1987 (aged 25)	11	(Iceland) ÍBV
2	DF	Joseph Ochaya	5 December 1994 (aged 17)	2	(Ghana) Asante Kotoko
3	MF	Geoffrey Kizito	2 February 1993 (aged 19)	2	(Vietnam) Sài Gòn
4	DF	Henry Kalungi	25 November 1987 (aged 24)	8	(United States) Carolina Railhawks
5	DF	Isaac Isinde	16 April 1991 (aged 21)	13	(Ethiopia) Saint-George SA
6	DF	Denis Iguma	10 February 1994 (aged 18)	3	(Uganda) Victoria
7	FW	Emmanuel Okwi	25 December 1992 (aged 19)	15	(Tanzania) Simba
8	MF	Saidi Kyeyune	1 January 1993 (aged 19)	0	(Uganda) U.R.A.
9	FW	Robert Ssentongo	5 June 1986 (aged 26)	15	(Uganda) U.R.A.
10	FW	Brian Umony	12 December 1986 (aged 25)	14	(Vietnam) Bình Dương
11	FW	Hamis Kizza	10 December 1990 (aged 21)	7	(Tanzania) Young Africans
12	MF	Manko Kaweesa	11 August 1988 (aged 24)	7	(Uganda) Victoria
13	MF	Moses Oloya	22 October 1992 (aged 20)	16	(Vietnam) Sài Gòn
14	DF	Nicholas Wadada	15 August 1992 (aged 20)	2	(Uganda) Vipers
15	DF	Godfrey Walusimbi	3 July 1989 (aged 23)	36	(Uganda) Vipers
16	DF	Hassan Wasswa (c)	14 February 1988 (aged 24)	19	(Uganda) Kampala City Council
17	MF	Brian Majwega	7 November 1992 (aged 20)	2	(Uganda) Kampala City Council
18	GK	Hamza Muwonge	6 November 1982 (aged 30)	19	(Uganda) Vipers
19	GK	Ali Kimera	4 July 1991 (aged 21)	1	(Uganda) Victoria

== Group B ==
=== Burundi ===
Coach: (Egypt) Lofty Naseem

No.	Pos.	Player	Date of birth (age)	Caps	Club
1	GK	Saïdi Nduwimana	5 May 1989 (aged 23)	2	(Burundi) Atlético Olympic
18	GK	MacArthur Arakaza	27 July 1992 (aged 20)	0	(Burundi) Flambeau de l'Est
	DF	Emery Nimubona	1 February 1992 (aged 20)	10	(Burundi) Atlético Olympic
	DF	Léopold Nkurikiye	5 December 1989 (aged 22)	8	(Burundi) Vital'O
	DF	Hassan Hakizimana	26 October 1990 (aged 22)	34	(Burundi) Atlético Olympic
	DF	Gilbert Kaze	20 December 1984 (aged 27)	8	(Burundi) Vital'O
	DF	Haruna Manirakiza	1 March 1993 (aged 19)	5	(Burundi) Inter Star
	DF	Issa "Vidic" Hakizimana	28 August 1994 (aged 18)	0	(Burundi) LLB Académic
14	DF	Yussuf Ndikumana	1 July 1993 (aged 19)	0	(Burundi) LLB Académic
	MF	Masudi Abdallah	7 December 1993 (aged 18)	0	(Burundi) Vital'O
	MF	Gaël Duhayindavyi	14 April 1990 (aged 22)	3	(Burundi) Atlético Olympic
6	MF	Christophe Nduwarugira	22 June 1994 (aged 18)	0	(Burundi) LLB Académic
	MF	Stève Nzigamasabo	10 December 1990 (aged 21)	1	(Burundi) Vital'O
	MF	Moussa Ally	29 September 1989 (aged 23)	0	(Burundi) Inter Star
	MF	Saïdi Djuma	24 December 1994 (aged 17)	0	(Burundi) LLB Académic
	FW	Christophe Ndayishimiye	30 November 1984 (aged 27)	1	(Burundi) Atlético Olympic
	FW	Amissi Tambwe	10 October 1988 (aged 24)	3	(Burundi) Vital'O
	FW	Fiston Abdoul Razak	9 November 1990 (aged 22)	5	(Burundi) LLB Académic
11	FW	Selemani Ndikumana (c)	16 November 1986 (aged 26)	15	(Rwanda) APR

=== Somalia ===
Head coach: (Uganda) Sam Ssimbwa

No.	Pos.	Player	Date of birth (age)	Caps	Club
	GK	Ahmed Abdulla Moalim	8 March 1993 (aged 19)	0	(Somalia) Elman
	GK	Muhsin Shariff Abdallah		0	(Somalia) Dekedaha
	DF	Ahmed Mohamed Ibrahim	2 February 1985 (aged 27)	2	(Somalia) Elman
	DF	Salah Hussein Sa'ad	12 April 1993 (aged 19)	6	(Somalia) Elman
	DF	Mahad Mohamed Haji	1 May 1994 (aged 18)	2	(Somalia) Heegan
	DF	Abubakar Nur Abdikarim	13 May 1992 (aged 20)	4	(Somalia) Heegan
	DF	Ahmed Ali Mohamed	23 October 1990 (aged 22)	0	(Netherlands) De Jodan Boys
	DF	Adan Hussein Ibrahim	5 March 1995 (aged 17)	5	(Somalia) Sahafi
	MF	Mohamed Mahmoud Said	15 June 1990 (aged 22)	1	(Somalia)
	MF	Mohamed Ali Osman	1 January 1986 (aged 26)	0	(Kuwait) Khaitan
	MF	Ahmed Abdulkadir Dahid	1 January 1981 (aged 31)	2	(Somalia) Heegan
	MF	Hassan Ali Mohamed	1 March 1994 (aged 18)	9	(Somalia)
	MF	Aweys Adan	14 June 1996 (aged 16)	0	(Somalia)
	FW	Jabril Hassan Mohamed	6 May 1988 (aged 24)	1	(Somalia) Heegan
	FW	Saadiq Abdikadir Mohamed	15 January 1996 (aged 16)	0	(Somalia) Banaadir
	FW	Dadir Amin Ali		0	(Somalia) Banaadir
	FW	Tima Jilac	27 December 1990 (aged 21)	0	(Kenya) Ligi Ndogo
	FW	Abdinur Mohamud	13 September 1997 (aged 15)	3	(Somalia) Jeenyo
		Hamza Mohamed Mukhtar		0	(Somalia)
		Muhsin Mohamed Abdalla		0	(Somalia)
		Yassin Mohamed Idris		2	(Somalia)

=== Sudan ===
Head coach: Mohamed Abdallah Mazda

No.	Pos.	Player	Date of birth (age)	Caps	Club
1	GK	Abdelrahman Ali	1 February 1984 (aged 28)	2	(Sudan) Al-Ahly Shendi
2	DF	Muawia Al-Amin	17 October 1988 (aged 24)	3	(Sudan) Al Neel SC (Al-Hasahisa)
3	DF	Faris Abdalla	19 February 1994 (aged 18)	0	(Sudan) Al-Ahly Shendi
4	DF	Sami Abdullah	17 February 1987 (aged 25)	13	(Sudan) Alamal SC Atbara
5	DF	Sadam Abu Taleb	8 November 1991 (aged 21)	0	(Sudan) Al-Ahly Shendi
6	MF	Mohamed El Mortada Ibrahim Kabir	14 May 1985 (aged 27)	0	(Sudan) Hilal Alsahil
7	MF	Hamouda Ahmed El Bashir	3 January 1984 (aged 28)	30	(Sudan) Al-Ahly Shendi
8	MF	Farid Mohamed Najeeb	14 May 1988 (aged 24)	2	(Sudan) Al-Ahly Shendi
9	MF	Ahmed El-Basha	2 January 1982 (aged 30)	37	(Sudan) Al-Merrikh SC
10	MF	Muhannad El Tahir	3 December 1984 (aged 27)	30	(Sudan) Al-Hilal Club
11	MF	Mohamed Al-Nour Osman "Jeyad"		3	(Sudan) Al-Ahly Shendi
12	MF	Saeed Sedig	19 December 1988 (aged 23)	0	(Sudan) Al-Nesoor SC
13	FW	Mudather Karika	18 December 1986 (aged 25)	33	(Sudan) Al-Hilal Club
14	FW	Mohamed Musa Idris	7 August 1990 (aged 22)	8	(Sudan) Al-Nesoor SC
15	FW	Adam Sayer	19 January 1983 (aged 29)	0	(Sudan) Alamal SC Atbara
16	FW	Osama Elrasheed	29 February 1988 (aged 24)	2	(Sudan) Al Neel SC (Al-Hasahisa)

=== Tanzania ===
Head coach: (Denmark) Kim Poulsen

No.	Pos.	Player	Date of birth (age)	Caps	Club
1	GK	Juma Kaseja (c)	20 April 1985 (aged 27)	48	(Tanzania) Simba
2	MF	Salum Abubakar	21 February 1989 (aged 23)	6	(Tanzania) Azam
3	MF	Athuman Idd	18 February 1988 (aged 24)	22	(Tanzania) Young Africans
4	DF	Erasto Nyoni	7 May 1988 (aged 24)	20	(Tanzania) Azam
5	DF	Kelvin Yondan	9 October 1984 (aged 28)	22	(Tanzania) Young Africans
6	DF	Issa Rashid	26 June 1994 (aged 18)	1	(Tanzania) Mtibwa Sugar
7	MF	Ramadhan Singano	4 March 1993 (aged 19)	1	(Tanzania) Simba
8	FW	Mrisho Ngassa	12 April 1989 (aged 23)	50	(Tanzania) Simba
9	MF	Amri Kiemba	25 December 1986 (aged 25)	1	(Tanzania) Simba
12	FW	Simon Msuva	2 October 1993 (aged 19)	2	(Tanzania) Young Africans
13	DF	Edward Christopher Shija	10 September 1992 (aged 20)	0	(Tanzania) Simba
14	FW	John Bocco	5 August 1989 (aged 23)	15	(Tanzania) Azam
15	MF	Mwinyi Kazimoto	25 December 1988 (aged 23)	16	(Tanzania) Simba
16	MF	Frank Domayo	16 February 1993 (aged 19)	6	(Tanzania) Young Africans
17	DF	Amir Maftah	26 February 1988 (aged 24)	24	(Tanzania) Simba
18	GK	Deo Bonaventure Munishi	6 April 1989 (aged 23)	2	(Tanzania) Azam
19	FW	Shaban Nditi	5 March 1983 (aged 29)	49	(Tanzania) Mtibwa Sugar
20	DF	Shomari Kapombe	28 January 1992 (aged 20)	12	(Tanzania) Simba

== Group C ==
=== Eritrea ===
Head coach: Negash Teklit

No.	Pos.	Player	Date of birth (age)	Caps	Club
1	GK	Samuel Alazar	20 February 1993 (aged 19)	1	(Eritrea) Denden
3	DF	Mehrawi Kesete	6 November 1993 (aged 19)	2	(Eritrea) Asmara Brewery
4	FW	Yosief Ghide	2 November 1995 (aged 17)	0	(Eritrea)
5	DF	Kibrom Mekonen			(Eritrea)
6	MF	Medhanie Redie	30 June 1993 (aged 19)	1	(Eritrea) Geza Banda FC
7	MF	Abdulrahman Ahmed	25 December 1995 (aged 16)	2	(Eritrea)
8	DF	Yohannes Nega	4 December 1993 (aged 18)	2	(Eritrea) Red Sea
9	FW	Tekle Tesfalem	9 October 1993 (aged 19)	2	(Eritrea) Al Tahrir
10	MF	Alexander Daniel	20 June 1994 (aged 18)	2	(Eritrea) Adulis Club
11	DF	Yohannes Tilahun	16 October 1993 (aged 19)	5	(Eritrea) Mai Temenai FC
12	GK	Fitsun Keleti	25 November 1988 (aged 23)	0	(Eritrea) Al Tahrir
13	MF	Solomon Yonathan	22 September 1993 (aged 19)	2	(Eritrea) Al Tahrir
14	MF	Hermon Tecleab (c)	3 December 1993 (aged 18)	3	(Eritrea) Mai Temenai FC
15	MF	Habteslus Aman	13 October 1990 (aged 22)	0	(Eritrea) Asmara Brewery
16	MF	Haile Mehrawi	20 December 1993 (aged 18)	0	(Eritrea) Geza Banda FC
17	FW	Gltenasae Kuluserhan	5 December 1993 (aged 18)	1	(Eritrea) Mai Temenai FC
18	DF	Kiflom Essey	7 July 1993 (aged 19)	2	(Eritrea) Al Tahrir
20	GK	Daniel Goitom	22 December 1979 (aged 32)	1	(Eritrea) Red Sea

=== Malawi ===
Head coach: (Malawi) Kinnah Phiri

No.	Pos.	Player	Date of birth (age)	Caps	Club
	GK	Charles Swini	28 February 1985 (aged 27)	6	(Malawi) Silver Strikers
	GK	Owen Chaima	16 February 1989 (aged 23)	0	(Malawi) Nyasa Big Bullets
	GK	Richard Chipuwa	21 October 1992 (aged 20)	0	(Malawi) Mighty Wanderers
	DF	Forster Namwera	19 September 1986 (aged 26)	11	(Malawi) Mighty Wanderers
	DF	Moses Chavula	8 August 1985 (aged 27)	61	(Malawi) Mighty Wanderers
	DF	Bongani Kaipa	24 November 1993 (aged 19)	2	(Malawi) Mighty Wanderers
	DF	Steve Changoma	15 January 1990 (aged 22)	6	(Malawi) Blue Eagles
	DF	George Nyirenda	21 November 1988 (aged 24)	0	(Malawi) Nyasa Big Bullets
	DF	Pilirani Makupe	8 November 1986 (aged 26)	13	(Malawi) CIVO United
	DF	John Lanjesi	3 March 1991 (aged 21)	1	(Malawi) CIVO United
	MF	Joseph Kamwendo	23 October 1986 (aged 26)	60	(Malawi) Mighty Wanderers
	MF	Patrick Masanjala	21 July 1986 (aged 26)	0	(Malawi) Blue Eagles
	MF	Micium Mhone	19 January 1992 (aged 20)	0	(Malawi) Blue Eagles
	MF	Ndaziona Chatsalira	8 November 1992 (aged 20)	10	(Malawi) Silver Strikers
	MF	Chimango Kayira	28 September 1993 (aged 19)	13	(Malawi) Nyasa Big Bullets
	MF	Bernard Harawa	14 January 1990 (aged 22)	3	(Malawi) Mighty Wanderers
	FW	Chiukepo Msowoya	23 September 1988 (aged 24)	22	(Malawi) ESCOM United
	FW	Rodrick Gonani	9 July 1991 (aged 21)	5	(Malawi) Silver Strikers
	FW	Green Harawa	21 January 1989 (aged 23)	4	(Malawi) Silver Strikers
	FW	Innocent Bokosi	1 November 1992 (aged 20)	0	(Malawi) Blue Eagles

=== Rwanda ===
Head coach: (Serbia) Milutin Sredojević

No.	Pos.	Player	Date of birth (age)	Caps	Club
1	GK	Jean-Luc Ndayishimiye	15 June 1988 (aged 24)	18	(Rwanda) A.P.R.
2	DF	Hamdan Bariyanga	6 June 1993 (aged 19)	2	(Rwanda) A.P.R.
4	MF	Michel Rusheshangoga	25 August 1994 (aged 18)	0	(Rwanda) A.P.R.
5	FW	Jimmy Mbaraga	2 July 1990 (aged 22)	2	(Rwanda) AS Kigali
6	DF	Fabrice Twagizimana	8 October 1990 (aged 22)	6	(Rwanda) Police FC
7	MF	Jean-Baptiste Mugiraneza	25 July 1988 (aged 24)	40	(Rwanda) A.P.R.
8	MF	Haruna Niyonzima (c)	2 November 1984 (aged 28)	47	(Tanzania) Young Africans
9	FW	Dady Birori	12 December 1986 (aged 25)	12	(Democratic Republic of the Congo) AS Vita Club
11	FW	Imran Nshimiyimana	18 August 1994 (aged 18)	4	(Rwanda) Police FC
12	MF	Jean-Claude Iranzi	15 October 1990 (aged 22)	21	(Rwanda) A.P.R.
13	DF	Ismael Nshutiyamagara	10 May 1987 (aged 25)	28	(Rwanda) A.P.R.
14	MF	Jean d'Amour Uwimana	26 October 1988 (aged 24)	2	(Rwanda) Police FC
15	DF	Emery Bayisenge	28 March 1994 (aged 18)	9	(Rwanda) A.P.R.
16	MF	Tumaine Ntamuhanga	10 February 1993 (aged 19)	11	(Rwanda) A.P.R.
17	MF	Charles Tibingana	27 August 1993 (aged 19)	7	(Uganda) Victoria University
18	GK	Jean-Claude Ndoli	7 October 1986 (aged 26)	31	(Rwanda) A.P.R.
19	FW	Barnabe Mubumbyi	24 July 1992 (aged 20)	1	(Rwanda) A.P.R.
20	GK	Marcel Nzarora	22 November 1994 (aged 18)	3	(Rwanda) Rayon Sports

=== Zanzibar ===
Head coach: (Zanzibar) Salum Nassor

No.	Pos.	Player	Date of birth (age)	Caps	Club
1	GK	Ally Mwadini	3 November 1985 (aged 27)	13	(Tanzania) Azam
2	DF	Nassor Massour Said	5 February 1984 (aged 28)	4	(Tanzania) Simba
3	MF	Ismail Abdulghani Gulam	9 October 1990 (aged 22)	14	(Tanzania) African Lyon
6	DF	Samir Nuhu	3 March 1993 (aged 19)	0	(Tanzania) Azam
7	MF	Suleiman Selembe	18 October 1987 (aged 25)	16	(Tanzania) Coastal Union
8	MF	Khamis Mcha Khamis	1 October 1989 (aged 23)	0	(Tanzania) Azam
9	FW	Jaku Juma Jaku	8 February 1989 (aged 23)	0	(Zanzibar) Mafunzo
10	FW	Ally Othman		0	(Zanzibar) Miembeni
11	FW	Amir Hamad Omary	29 October 1985 (aged 27)	1	(Tanzania) JKT Oljoro
12	MF	Abdalla Seif Ali	5 January 1993 (aged 19)	0	(Tanzania) Azam
13	DF	Nadir Haroub (c)	10 February 1982 (aged 30)	29	(Tanzania) Young Africans
14	MF	Azizi Saweji Azizi		0	(Zanzibar) Ocean View
15	DF	Aggrey Morris	12 March 1984 (aged 28)	21	(Tanzania) Azam
16	MF	Sabri Makame	9 December 1991 (aged 20)	0	(Tanzania) Coastal Union
17	FW	Ahmed Adeyom Saleh	15 November 1995 (aged 17)	0	(Zanzibar) Black Sailor
18	MF	Ally Twaha	8 August 1982 (aged 30)	4	(Tanzania) Mtibwa Sugar
19	FW	Abdallah Othman	1 January 1983 (aged 29)	0	(Zanzibar) Jamhuri
20	GK	Abdallah Rashid Abdallah	6 September 1992 (aged 20)	0	(Zanzibar) Kipanga
		Ishak Othman Omar		0	(Zanzibar)
