= List of football clubs in South Sudan =

This is a list of football (soccer) clubs in South Sudan. For a complete list see Category:Football clubs in South Sudan

== Central Equatoria ==
- Al-Hilal FC (Juba)
- Al-Malakia FC
- Al Merreikh FC (South Sudan)
- Atlabara FC
- El Nasir FC
- Kator FC
- Lion Hunters F.C.
- Munuki FC
- Rainbow FC (South Sudan)
- Rapta FC
- Talanga FC

== Eastern Equatoria ==
- Nile Eagle FC
- Nimule Customs F.C.
- Young Stars FC
- (Volcano FC)

== Jonglei ==
- Koryom FC
- Super Star FC
- Salaam FC
- El Gezira FC

== Lakes State ==
- Zalan FC

== Northern Bahr El Ghazal ==
- Aweil Stars F.C.
- Ayat Stars FC
- Islah FC
- Mabil F.C.
- Merreikh Aweil F.C.
- Red Army FC
- Salaam Aweil F.C.
- Wanyjok F.C.

== Unity State ==
. Bentiu City Sports Club

== Upper Nile ==
- Koryom F.C.

== Western Bahr El Ghazal ==
- Al-Hilal FC (Wau)
- Al-Salam FC

== Western Equatoria ==
- Nile City F.C.

== Women's football clubs ==
- Yei Joint Stars F.C.

== Sources ==
- South Sudan 2011
- South Sudan 2012
- South Sudan 2013
