= 2025–26 South Sudan Premier League =

Football league season

South Sudan Premier League
- Season: 2025–26
- Matches: 140
- Goals: 515 (3.68 per match)
- Biggest home win: El Merriekh 10–1 Lion Hunters
- Biggest away win: Bentiu City 2–8 Jamus
- Highest scoring: El Merriekh 10–1 Lion Hunters (11 goals)
- All statistics correct as of 11 March 2026.

The 2025–26 South Sudan Premier League is the second season of the South Sudan Premier League. It is known as the MTN Premier League for sponsorship reasons, and also commonly referred to as the SSFA Premier League after the governing body.

Jamus participates as champions of 2025 South Sudan Championship which is now 2nd tier league, the eventual champions will make history as first club to win this title.

== League table ==
As of 11 March 2026

Pos	Team	Pld	W	D	L	GF	GA	GD	Pts	Qualification or relegation
1	El Merriekh	20	16	3	1	61	15	+46	51	Qualification for CAF Champions League
2	Jamus	20	15	3	2	64	13	+51	48	Qualification for CAF Confederation Cup
3	Holy Family	20	13	2	5	43	25	+18	41	
4	Kator	20	12	4	4	36	18	+18	40	
5	Malakia	20	11	5	4	39	24	+15	38	
6	Al Ghazala	20	11	0	9	47	39	+8	33	
7	Atlabara	20	9	4	7	30	29	+1	31	
8	Wajuma	20	9	1	10	32	34	−2	28	
9	Koryom	20	6	5	9	39	46	−7	23	
10	Olympic	20	6	2	12	21	41	−20	20	
11	Salam Aweil	20	4	4	12	30	53	−23	16	
12	Al Hilal	20	2	6	12	25	35	−10	12	
13	Bentiu City	20	3	3	14	27	68	−41	12	Relegation to South Sudan National League
14	Lion Hunters	20	1	2	17	21	75	−54	5	Relegation to South Sudan National League

Source: Global Sports Archive
Rules for classification: 1) points; 2) head-to-head points; 3) head-to-head goal difference; 4) head-to-head goals scored; 5) goal difference; 6) goals scored; 7) playoff.

== Statistics ==
=== Goals ===
As of 11 March 2026

Rank	Player	Club	Goals
1	(South Sudan) Justin Azuma	Holy Family	17
2	(Uganda) Kiirya Christopher	Koryom	15
2	(Sudan) Mohamed Musa	El-Merriekh	15
4	(South Sudan) David Sebit	Kator	14
5	(Cameroon) George Rodriguez	Jamus	13
6	(South Sudan) Michael Taku	Kator	11
6	(South Sudan) Sabri Motwakil	Wajuma	11
8	(Uganda) Khasimuh Mugoya	Malakia	10
8	(South Sudan) Aluk Lual	Al-Ghazala	10
8	(Sudan) Mohamed Adil	Jamus	10

== See also ==
- List of football clubs in South Sudan
