= 2019 South Sudan Football Championship =

South Sudan Football Championship
- Season: 2019
- Champions: Atlabara

The 2019 South Sudan Football Championship (also called the 2019 South Sudan Champions League or 2019 South Sudan Premier League) was the 5th season of the South Sudan Football Championship, the top-level football championship of South Sudan.

== Group stage ==
Teams that qualified as local league champions were divided into three groups: Group A in Juba, Group B in Wau, and Group C in Malakal. The group stage kicked off on 20 May 2019.

The winners of each group advance to the Championship playoff.

=== Group A ===
Pos	Team	Pld	W	D	L	GF	GA	GD	Pts	Qualification or relegation
1	Atlabara (Q)	3	3	0	0	7	0	+7	9	Qualification for Championship playoff
2	Lizira Super Star	3	2	0	1	4	2	+2	6	
3	Al-Malakia	3	1	0	2	2	5	−3	3	
4	Koryom	3	0	0	3	1	7	−6	0	
5	Villa United	0	0	0	0	0	0	0	0	Did not show

Source: SSFA
(Q) Qualified for the phase indicated

=== Group B ===
Pos	Team	Pld	W	D	L	GF	GA	GD	Pts	Qualification or relegation
1	Al-Hilal Wau (Q)	4	3	1	0	7	2	+5	10	Qualification for Championship playoff
2	Abyei City	4	2	1	1	3	3	0	7	
3	Holy Family	4	1	1	2	6	5	+1	4	
4	Tiger	3	1	0	2	3	4	−1	3	
5	Aweil United	3	0	1	2	0	5	−5	1	

Source: SSFA
(Q) Qualified for the phase indicated

=== Group C ===
Pos	Team	Pld	W	D	L	GF	GA	GD	Pts	Qualification or relegation
1	Al-Gadishia	2	2	0	0	6	0	+6	6	Qualification for Championship playoff
2	Gelb Alasid	2	0	1	1	1	4	−3	1	
3	Sobat	2	0	1	1	1	4	−3	1	

Source: SSFA

== Championship playoff ==
Played between 8 and 12 June 2019 at Wau Stadium.

Pos	Team	Pld	W	D	L	GF	GA	GD	Pts	Qualification or relegation (Note: Amarat United FC (not qualified for 2019 South Sudan Football Championship) are South Sudan National Cup winners and qualify for Confederation Cup.)
1	Atlabara (C)	2	1	1	0	4	1	+3	4	Qualification for Champions League
2	Al-Hilal Wau	2	0	2	0	1	1	0	2	
3	Al-Gadishia	2	0	1	1	2	5	−3	1	

Source: SSFA
(C) Champions

== Championship playoff clubs' stadiums ==
Team	Location	Stadium	Capacity
Atlabara FC	Juba	Juba Stadium	7,000
Al-Hilal FC	Wau	Wau Stadium	5,000
Al-Gadishia			

== See also ==
- 2019 South Sudan National Cup
