= 2024–25 South Sudan Premier League =

Football league season

Premier League
- Season: 2024–25
- Dates: 21 December 2024 – 31 May 2025
- Champions: Jamus SC (1st title)
- Relegated: Young Stars FC; Nile City FC
- Champions League: Jamus SC
- Matches: 182
- Goals: 663 (3.64 per match)
- Biggest home win: Kator 7–0 Nile City (17 January 2025)
- Biggest away win: Young Stars 1–9 El-Merriekh Bentiu (23 May 2025)
- Highest scoring: Nile City 4–8 Koryom (31 May 2025)
- All statistics correct as of 31 May 2025.

The inaugural 2024/25 South Sudan Premier League, launched on December 21, 2024. established a top-tier league, highlighted by Jamus SC undefeated Championship campaign. The high-scoring season, featuring 663 goals in 182 matches concluded with Jamus SC completing a domestic treble and qualifying for the 2025-26 CAF Champions League Qualifications.

== League table ==
As of 31 May 2025

Pos	Team	Pld	W	D	L	GF	GA	GD	Pts	Qualification or relegation
1	Jamus (C)	26	21	5	0	89	19	+70	68	Qualification for CAF Champions League
2	Kator	26	19	5	2	67	20	+47	62	
3	El Merriekh Bentiu	26	18	4	4	79	26	+53	58	
4	Holy Family	26	18	4	4	66	31	+35	58	
5	Koryom	26	14	4	8	53	48	+5	46	
6	Malakia	26	12	4	10	41	29	+12	40	
7	Wajuma	26	10	5	11	44	30	+14	35	
8	Salam Aweil	26	9	7	10	42	56	−14	34	
9	Al Hilal Wau	26	10	3	13	33	42	−9	33	
10	Olympic Renk	26	7	2	17	28	60	−32	23	
11	Bentiu City	26	6	4	16	35	64	−29	22	
12	Lion Hunters	26	5	3	18	28	60	−32	18	
13	Young Stars (R)	26	2	8	16	27	80	−53	14	Relegation to South Sudan National League
14	Nile City (R)	26	1	2	23	31	98	−67	5	Relegation to South Sudan National League

Updated to match(es) played on unknown. Source:
Rules for classification: 1) points; 2) head-to-head points; 3) head-to-head goal difference; 4) head-to-head goals scored; 5) goal difference; 6) goals scored; 7) playoff.
(C) Champions; (R) Relegated
