= Islah FC =

Islah
- Full name: Islah Football Club
- Nickname: The Prison Warders
- Founded: 4 February 2010; 16 years ago
- Ground: Aweil Stadium
- Capacity: 1,500
- President: Gabriel Ayom
- Head Coach: Osman Ali
- League: South Sudan Premier League
- 2015: 7th place
- Website: http://www.selahfc.com
Home colours	Away colours

Islah Football Club is a South Sudanese federation soccer club professionally known as Islah or Sejune otherwise Sijn, currently based in Aweil, South Sudan. Islah, Sejune and Sijn are Arabic words which are translated to English as "prison". It was established on February 4, 2010, by Aweil Prison Service (APS), so it is rumoured as governmental soccer club. It shares Aweil Stadium with various teams namely Tuek Tuek, Madiria, Apada, Ayat Stars, Merreikh Aweil, Salaam Aweil and Aweil Stars. It participates in the South Sudan Premier League, South Sudan National Cup and South Sudan Football Championship. Islah is one of the victorious teams of South Sudan.

== Club history ==
As of June 2011, Islah was promoted to the second division from the third division, and in 2012 it reached the first division. It won its first major trophy, the South Sudan Cup, in 2015. Salaam Aweil won an independence cup against Islah and in the same year Salaam won a local cup against Islah. In April 2016 Islah defeated Aweil Stars 1–2 in Aweil State qualification for the South Sudan Cup. After the match, Islah FC received donations of £10,000 SSP from the governor, £3,000 SSP from the state legislative assembly, and £3,000 SSP from the government of Wanyjok. On August 29, 2016, Islah beat Apada 8–0.

In 2016, Islah thrashed Abiem Nhom F.C. in South Sudan League which was hosted in Aweil. They also threw General Anyuon F.C. 3–1. And Islah were beaten in penalties by Wau Salaam in the final in the same league which was hosted in Aweil.
