= 2017 South Sudan Football Championship =

South Sudan Football Championship
- Season: 2017
- Champions: Wau Salaam FC

The 2017 South Sudan Football Championship (also called the 2017 South Sudan Champions League or 2017 South Sudan Premier League) was the 4th season of the South Sudan Football Championship, the then top-level football championship of South Sudan. It was played between 9 and 26 November 2017.

== Group stage ==
There were two groups, with Group A played in Juba and Group B played in Wau.

Kator FC won Group A and Wau Salaam FC won Group B.

=== Group A ===
Pos	Team	Pld	W	D	L	GF	GA	GD	Pts	Qualification or relegation
1	Kator FC	4	4	0	0	17	2	+15	12	Final
2	Dream FC	4	2	0	2	5	4	+1	6	
3	Merikh FC (Renk)	4	1	2	1	3	3	0	5	
4	Tahrir FC	4	1	1	2	5	10	−5	4	
5	Kuch FC	4	0	1	3	1	12	−11	1	

=== Group B ===
Pos	Team	Pld	W	D	L	GF	GA	GD	Pts	Qualification or relegation
1	Al-Salam FC	4	3	1	0	8	1	+7	10	Final
2	Zalan FC	4	3	0	1	7	2	+5	9	
3	Aweil Stars FC	4	2	0	2	6	8	−2	6	
4	Tiger FC	4	1	1	2	7	6	+1	4	
5	Merikh FC	4	0	0	4	2	13	−11	0	

== Final ==
[Nov 26, Wau]

Al-Salam (Wau) 2-1 Kator FC (Juba)
