= 2018 South Sudan Football Championship =

South Sudan Football Championship
- Season: 2018
- Champions: Al-Hilal Wau

The 2018 South Sudan Football Championship (also called the 2018 South Sudan Champions League or 2018 South Sudan Premier League) was the 4th season of the South Sudan Football Championship, the top-level football championship of South Sudan. It was played between 10 and 23 October 2018.

== Group stage ==
There were two groups, with Group A played in Juba and Group B played in Rumbek.

Al-Merreikh won Group A and Al-Hilal Wau won Group B.

== Final ==
The final was played on 23 October 2018 at the Juba Stadium in Juba.

Al-Merreikh 1–1 (6–7 pen.) Al-Hilal Wau

Al-Merreikh later filed an appeal that Al-Hilal Wau fielded an ineligible player, and were awarded the title, but this was later overturned by South Sudan Football Association.

== Final table ==
1.Al-Hilal Wau (Wau)                               3   2  1  0   4- 1   7  Final

2.Zalan FC (Rumbek)                                3   2  0  1   2- 2   6  [*]

3.Al-Salam FC (Kuajok)                             3   0  2  1   2- 2   2  [*]

4.22 Brothers FC (Aweil)                           3   0  1  2   2- 5   1

== See also ==
- 2018 South Sudan National Cup
