= Kalu Michael =

Nigerian footballer

Personal information
- Full name: Kalu Prince Michael
- Date of birth: November 8, 2000 (age 25)
- Place of birth: Okrika, Nigeria
- Height: 1.80 m (5 ft 11 in)
- Position: Defensive midfielder

Team information
- Current team: Al-Hawija SC
- Number: 6

Youth career
- 2015: Wau Salaam FC

Senior career*
| Years | Team | Apps | (Gls) |
| 2016–2018 | Wau Salaam FC | 71 | (4) |
| 2018–2020 | Jazeera SC | 37 | (1) |
| 2020–2021 | ACS Hayableh | 17 | (1) |
| 2021-2022 | Samarra SC | 12 | (–) |
| 2022 | Ghaz Al-Shamal | 11 | (-) |
| 2022- | Al-Hawija SC | 23 | (-) |
- * Club domestic league appearances and goals

Kalu Michael (born November 11, 2000) is a Nigerian professional footballer, who currently plays for Al-Hawija SC in the Iraqi First Division League.

== Career ==
=== Wau Salaam FC ===
Kalu Michael started his football career after moving to South Sudan to live with an uncle. He was 15 when he was scouted and signed by Wau Salaam FC. After 1 year he was promoted to the first team, where he won 1 South Sudan Football Championship and 2 South Sudan National Cup. He was also voted the best defender at the 2016 South Sudan National Cup at age 16.

=== Jazeera SC ===
In 2018 after his 18th birthday he signed for Jazeera Sports Club a newly promoted Somali First Division team and helped them to a 6th position finish, retaining their Somali First Division status for the 2019/2020 season. On the 2nd of January 2019 Kalu was awarded with the Fair Play Award at the Somali Football Awards for the 2018/2019 season

=== ACS Hayableh ===
On 29 October 2020, Kalu was unveiled by ACS Hayableh on a 1-year contract, making him the 4th foreign player on their roster.

=== Samarra SC ===
After an incredible season with ACS Hayableh, Kalu was offered a 2-year contract extension but rather he chose to move to Iraqi Premier League newly promoted side Samarra SC

=== Ghaz Al-Shamal ===
After Terminating his contract with Samarra SC in January because non payment of salary, Kalu Joined an Iraqi First Division League Side Ghaz Al-Shamal for the remaining of the 2021-2022 Season

== Honours ==
=== Club ===
Al-Salam FC

- South Sudan Football Championship: 2017
- South Sudan National Cup: 2016, 2017

=== Individual ===
- Best Defender Zone 2: South Sudan National Cup: 2016
- Fair Play Award: Somali Football Awards 2019
