= 2018 South Sudan National Cup =

Tournament details
- Country: South Sudan

Final positions
- Champions: Al-Merreikh Juba

The 2018 South Sudan National Cup is the 6th edition of the South Sudan National Cup, the knockout football competition of South Sudan.

== Group stage ==
There were two groups, with Group A played in Juba and Group B played in Aweil.

Al-Merreikh won Group A and Al-Ghazala won Group B.

== Final ==
The final was played on 14 August 2018 at the Juba Stadium in Juba.

Al-Merreikh Juba 2–0 Al-Ghazala

== See also ==
- 2018 South Sudan Football Championship
