= Aluck Akech =

South Sudanese professional footballer (born 1994)

Personal information
- Full name: Aluck Akech Mabior
- Date of birth: February 8, 1994 (age 32)
- Place of birth: Aweil, Sudan
- Height: 1.85 m (6 ft 1 in)
- Position: Forward

Senior career*
Years	Team	Apps	(Gls)
2010–2011	Aweil Stars F.C.	12	(19)
2012–2013	Salaam Aweil F.C.	31	(24)
2013–2014	Malakia	40	(6)
2015	Al-Merreikh Kosti	2	(3)
2016	Al-Merreikh SC	1	(2)
2017–2018	Al-Shorta SC (El Gadarif)		
2018–2019	Al-Ahli SC (El Gadarif)		
2019–2021	Alamal SC Atbara		

International career^{‡}
2014–	South Sudan	18	(0)
- * Club domestic league appearances and goals ‡ National team caps and goals as of 24 May 2017

Aluck Akech Mabior (born February 8, 1994), known as Aluck Akech (Aweil, South Sudan), also spelled as Aluk Akec in Dinka language, is a South Sudanese professional footballer who plays for Sudanese club Al-Merreikh SC. Aluck started his football career as street football in the Sudan before South Sudan gained its independence. In 2009 Aluck returned to the south, and Aweil Stars administrators realised that Aluck was footballer and that great realisation brought them to registration of Aluck. And in the year 2012 Aluck joined Salaam Aweil from Aweil Stars. And he spent two years with Salaam Aweil than Salaam Aweil sold him to Malakia in 2014. When Aluck was playing in Juba (the South Sudanese capital) for Malakia; South Sudan national football team administrators realized that he was capable for South Sudan national football team. And Malakia sold him to Sudanese club Al-Merreikh Costi in 2014. And Merreikh Kosti sold him to Al-Merreikh SC.

== South Sudan national football team ==
Aluck first started his national games with South Sudan faced Kenya, Mali, Equatorial Guinea and Mauritania. Aluck is the first South Sudanese player who was given red card in the World Cup record in Nouakchott the Mauritanian capital. On September 4, 2016, Aluck was included in the squad of South Sudan against Equatorial Guinea in last match of South Sudan in the 2017 Africa Cup of Nations qualification Group C.

=== Al-Merreikh SC ===
Aluck was signed by Sudanese club Merreikh Omdurman-based club in 2015 and was said registered as a local Sudanese player despite representing South Sudan at international level. The Sudan Football Association have largely banned him from playing in that year, Sudan Premier League until the matter is resolved.
