= James Kone =

South Sudanese footballer (born 1987)

Personal information
- Full name: James Kone
- Date of birth: 28 November 1987 (age 38)
- Position: Striker

International career
Years	Team	Apps	(Gls)
2012–	South Sudan	2	(0)

James Gatwich Kone (born 28 November 1987), also spelt Kon, is a South Sudanese footballer who plays as a striker, who played for the South Sudan national football team in 2012.

== Early life ==
James Gatwich Kone was born on 28 November 1987 in Malakal, South Sudan.

== Club career ==
From 2012 to 2014, Kone played for Nasir FC Juba, moving to Al-Malakia Juba from 2015 to 2016. He then played for Al-Salam Wau (2017); Kator FC Juba (2018); and Amarat United (2019).

== International career ==
He has made two senior appearances for South Sudan, against Ethiopia and Kenya in the 2012 CECAFA Cup.
