= Ayat Stars FC =

Ayat Stars
- Full name: Ayat Stars Football Club
- Nickname(s): The Thunders
- Founded: 30 December 2009; 15 years ago
- Ground: Aweil Stadium
- Capacity: 1,500
- President: Steigner Ramatalli
- Head Coach: Deng Atak
- League: South Sudan Premier League
- SSPL 2015: 27th place
- Website: http://www.ayatstarsfc.com
Home colours	Away colours

Ayat Stars Football Club, also known as Ayat Stars or simply Ayat, is a South Sudanese soccer club. The club is currently based in Aweil Centre County, Aweil State, in northwestern South Sudan, near the International border with the Republic of Sudan and the Abyei Region. The team is nicknamed "The Thunders". It was formed on December 30, 2009, and initially started as a part of the South Sudan Premier League (SSPL). Ayat shares Aweil Stadium with various teams such as Tuektuek, Madiria, Apada, Merreikh Aweil, Salaam Aweil and Aweil Stars. They participate in the South Sudan Premier League, South Sudan National Cup and South Sudan Football Championship, depending on qualification.

== Club history ==
Ayat Stars beat Salaam Aweil on May 6, 2015, at 2–1.
