= Manase (disambiguation) =

Manase is a village in Samoa

Manase may also refer to:

== People ==
=== Given name ===
- Manasé Bezara, Malagasy politician
- Manase Fainu, Tonga international rugby league footballer
- Manasé Bezara, Malagasy politician.
- Manase Manuokafoa, Tonga international rugby league footballer
- Manase Tonga, American football fullback

=== Surname ===
- Manase Dōsan, Japanese physician and anatomist
- Emmanuel Manase, South Sudanese footballer
- Juri Manase, Japanese actress
- Lwando Manase, South African former cricketer
- Manavaalofa Tutuila Manase, American Samoan politician
- Yuna Manase, Japanese professional wrestler

== Films ==
- Manase Mandiram Indian Telugu-language romantic drama film
- Manase Ninakku Mangalam Indian Malayalam-language film
- Muddu Manase Indian Kannada romance drama film

== Other ==
- O Manase Kannada-language fortnightly youth magazine

== See also ==
- Manasses (disambiguation)
