= Tilahun =

Tilahun (Amharic: ጥላሁን) is a male name of Ethiopian origin that may refer to:

- Tilahun Gessesse (1940–2009), Ethiopian singer
- Tilahun Regassa (born 1990), Ethiopian long-distance runner
- Yohannes Tilahun (born 1993), Eritrea international footballer
