= Rainbow FC =

Rainbow FC is the name of several football clubs:

- Rainbow FC (Cameroon)
- Rainbow FC (South Sudan)
- Rainbow FC (Bihar)
