= Youk =

Youk may refer to:

== People ==
=== First name ===
- Youk Chhang (born 1961), Cambodian executive director

=== Surname ===
- Makuac Teny Youk, South Sudanese politician
- Thomas Youk (c. 1946 – 1998), euthanasia recipient

== Other ==
- Youk, fictional grizzly bear in The Bear (1998 film)

== See also ==
- Yook, a Korean surname
