= Emmanuel Thomas Lumeri =

South Sudanese footballer

Personal information
- Date of birth: 16 May 1993 (age 33)
- Place of birth: Juba, Sudan (now South Sudan)
- Position: Midfielder

Team information
- Current team: Amarat United

Senior career*
Years	Team	Apps	(Gls)
2019–	Amarat United		

International career^{‡}
2019–	South Sudan	8	(0)
- * Club domestic league appearances and goals ‡ National team caps and goals as of 13 March 2021.

Emmanuel Thomas Lumeri (born 16 May 1993) is a South Sudanese footballer who plays as a midfielder for South Sudan Premier League club Amarat United and the South Sudan national team.

== Club career ==
Lumeri has played for Amarat United in South Sudan.

== International career ==
Lumeri capped for South Sudan at senior level during the 2022 FIFA World Cup qualification (CAF first round).
