= Rapta FC =

- Ground: Juba Stadium, South Sudan
- Capacity: 12,000
- League: South Sudan Football Championship

Rapta FC is a South Sudanese football club located in Juba, South Sudan which currently plays in the South Sudan Football Championship.

== Stadium ==
Currently the team plays at the 12,000 capacity Juba Stadium.
