= Teny =

Teny can be both a middle name and a surname. Notable people with this name include:

- Angelina Teny, South Sudanese politician
- Riek Machar Teny Dhurgon (born 1952), South Sudanese politician
- Makuac Teny Youk, South Sudanese politician

== See also ==
- TeNY, a TV station in Japan
