= Al Hilal FC (Juba) =

Al-Hilal FC
- Full name: Al Hilal Football Club
- Nicknames: The African Blues, ( Home of Nile ) ( Blue Palace )
- Founded: 1956
- Ground: Juba Stadium
- Capacity: 12,000
- League: South Sudan Football Championship
Home colours	Away colours	Third colours

Al Hilal Juba Football Club is a South Sudanese football club located in Juba, South Sudan, which currently plays in the South Sudan Football Championship.

== Name and history ==
The name Hilāl is the Arabic word for crescent – a name chosen on a night when the crescent of the moon was visible in Omdurman. Also it is the first club in the world to be named (AL- HILAL). This name coming from North Sudan.

Al Hilal Juba was established in 1956 by the Sudanese community in Juba, who were fans of Al Hilal Omdurman. Since then, they have gone onto become one of Juba's strongest clubs and are the reigning South Sudan Cup champions after taking the title in 2017.

== Stadium ==
Currently the team plays at the 12000 capacity Juba Stadium.

== Honours ==
=== South Sudan competitions ===
- South Sudan Football Championship: 2

Winners: 2012, 2014
Runners-up (2): 2015, 2017

- South Sudan National Cup:3

Winners: 2013, 2014, 2015

== Performance in CAF competitions ==
- CAF Confederation Cup: 1 appearance

2014 – Preliminary round

2018 – Preliminary round

- CAF Champions League: 1 appearances

2012 – Preliminary round
