= Football in South Sudan =

- National teams: men's national team women's national team

Club competitions
- South Sudan Football Championship

International competitions
- Champions League; CAF Confederation Cup; Super Cup; FIFA Club World Cup; FIFA World Cup (National Team); African Cup of Nations (National Team)

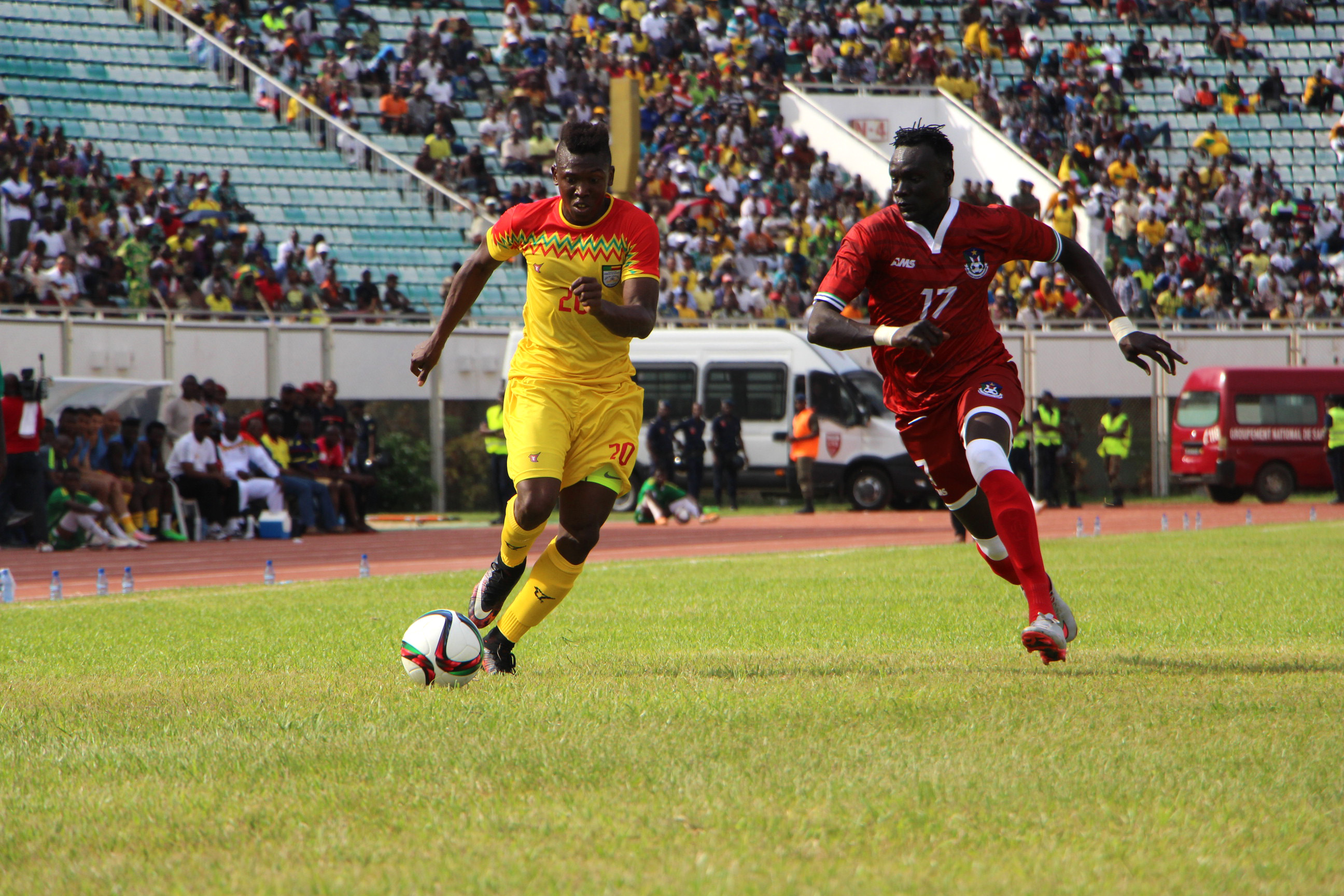
A player of the South Sudan national football team in a red jersey.

The sport of football in the country of South Sudan is run by the South Sudan Football Association. The association administers the national football team, as well as the Football Championship. Football is the most popular sport in South Sudan. Approximately one in five people in South Sudan are considered association football fans.

== South Sudan national football stadium ==
Stadium	Capacity	City	Tenants	Image
Juba Stadium	10,000	Juba	South Sudan national football team, Al-Malakia FC	

== Attendances ==
The average attendance per top-flight football league season and the club with the highest average attendance:

Season	League average	Best club	Best club average
2024-25	673	Jamus SC	1,782

Source: League page on Wikipedia

== See also ==
- Lists of stadiums
