= David Dada =

South Sudanese footballer

Personal information
- Date of birth: 20 November 1993 (age 32)
- Place of birth: Maridi, Sudan (now South Sudan)
- Height: 1.65 m (5 ft 5 in)
- Position: Defender

Team information
- Current team: Al-Malakia FC

Senior career*
Years	Team	Apps	(Gls)
2014–	Al-Malakia FC		

International career^{‡}
2014–	South Sudan	18	(0)
- * Club domestic league appearances and goals as of 14:06, 4 June 2017 (UTC) ‡ National team caps and goals as of 14:06, 4 June 2017 (UTC)

David Dada (born 20 November 1993) is a South Sudanese footballer who currently plays as a defender for the South Sudanese team Al-Malakia FC and South Sudan's national team.

== Career ==
=== International ===
Dada made his first senior international appearance in a friendly in and against Botswana on 5 March 2014, having played the entire match.
