= Salaam Aweil FC =

Salaam Aweil
- Full name: Salaam Aweil Football Club
- Nickname(s): The Doves
- Founded: 16 April 2009; 16 years ago
- Ground: Aweil Stadium
- Capacity: 1,500
- President: Philipe Madut
- Head Coach: Luiz Majock
- League: South Sudan Premier League
- 2015: 2nd place
- Website: http://www.salaamaweil.com
Home colours	Away colours

Salaam Aweil Football Club is a South Sudanese club commonly known as Salaam Aweil or Salaam, currently based in Aweil, South Sudan. Founded on 16 of April 2009 by police.

== History ==
Salaam Aweil Football Club is a South Sudanese club commonly known as Salaam Aweil or Salaam, currently based in Aweil, South Sudan. Founded on 16 of April 2009 by police. It plays at Aweil Stadium and it currently sharing Aweil Stadium with Merreikh Aweil and Aweil Stars. Salaam is governmental team. They play in the South Sudan Premier League, South Sudan National Cup and South Sudan Football Championship. Salaam is one of the victorious teams of South Sudan, and they are winners of South Sudan Premier League.

== Origin ==
Since the foundation of Salaam; they took part in South Sudan National League as of season 2011-12. As of season 2013-14, Salaam won a match against Merreikh Aweil that ended 2–1. At the end of the season, the club transferred their all-time best team player Aluck Akech to Al-Malakia FC . Salaam also won an independence cup against Islah and in the same year Salaam won a local cup against Islah F.C. Salaam Aweil won a match against Aweil Stars that ended 5–2 at Aweil Stadium. On May 6, 2015 Ayat Stars thrashed Salaam Aweil 2–1 in the South Sudan premier league. In the evening of 21 July 2015, Salaam Aweil lost a cup match against Aweil Stars in the final on penalties, in the presence of state governor Salva Chol Ayat, and South Sudanese football president.

=== Honours ===
- 2 Cup League (Independence Cup)

2014–2015

=== Aluck Akech ===
Aluck is Salaam Aweil's all time player, in the transfer window of 2012 Salaam Aweil signed Aluck for a four year-dealt from Aweil Stars, transfer fee was rumoured as £6,000 SSP. As of 2014, Salaam Aweil sold Aluk to Malakia.
