= Talanga FC =

Talanga
- Full name: Talanga Football Club
- Founded: 1975
- Ground: Juba Stadium, South Sudan
- Capacity: 12,000
- League: South Sudan Football Championship
Home colours	Away colours

Talanga FC is a South Sudanese football club located in Juba, South Sudan which currently plays in the South Sudan Football Championship.

== Stadium ==
Currently the team plays at the 12000 capacity Juba Stadium.
