= Al-Salam FC =

Al-Salam
- Full name: Al-Salam Football Club
- Nickname: White Dove
- Founded: 1968; 58 years ago
- Ground: Wau Stadium
- Capacity: 7,000
- Manager: Ramzi Sebit Lumoro
- League: South Sudan Championship
Home colours	Away colours

Al-Salam Football Club, also known as Al-Salam Wau, is a South Sudanese professional football club based in Wau, that participates in the South Sudan Premier League.

== History ==
Al-Salam Football Club, also known as Al Salam Wau owing to its location in the city of Wau, was founded in 1968.

Al-Salam won the inaugural football league in 2011–12, and was the first ever South Sudanese club to enter the 2012 Kagame Interclub Cup. The team played its first match against Rwandan side Armee Patriotique Rwandaise F.C. however they suffered a heavy 7–0 defeat on their debut.

The poor tournament for Al-Salam continued with heavy defeats in their next two games (7–1 to Young Africans S.C.) and (5–0 to Atletico Olympic F.C.), but Al-Salam's Khamis Deshama Ulama made history by becoming the first ever South Sudanese footballer to score in an international tournament. Al-salam were out at the first round.

In 2016 Al-Salam beat Wanyjok F.C. 4–0 in South Sudan League qualification which was hosted in Aweil. They also beat Islah F.C. in penalties in the final. Al-Salam won the South Sudan National Cup after beating Young Stars FC of Torit 3–0 in the final.

In 2017, they won the double South Sudan National Cup and the South Sudan Football Championship respectively.

== Titles and performances ==
- South Sudan Football Championship: 2
- Winners: 2012, 2017
- South Sudan National Cup: 2
- Winners: 2016, 2017

== Current squad ==
Note: Flags indicate national team as defined under FIFA eligibility rules; some limited exceptions apply. Players may hold more than one non-FIFA nationality.

No.	Pos.	Nation	Player
1	GK	SSD	Robert Joseph Adu
2	DF	SSD	Edward Jovan Simon
12	DF	SSD	Richard Zubier Abdurahman
8	MF	SSD	Khalid Juma (footballer)
17	FW	SSD	Aru Mawien Deng
10	FW	SSD	Oliver Paul Kangi (captain )
14	DF	SSD	Rofino Joseph Uras
11	FW	SDN	Sami Abuhoziefa Sulieman
7	FW	SSD	Thomas Rofino Thomas
16	MF	SSD	Elhaj Abdalla Abugiad
15	MF	SSD	Akot Kuac Dhol
21	FW	SSD	Mohammed Sulieman Ali
5	DF	SSD	Salah Abubaker Adam

No.	Pos.	Nation	Player
13	GK	SSD	Simon Angelo Rizik
19	MF	SSD	Kuac Wol Malou
25	MF	SSD	Santino Mayen Anei
27	MF	SSD	Michael Odok Deng
3	DF	SSD	Kasper Ali Adam
4	DF	SSD	James Anei Matiel
9	FW	SSD	Kun James Gatwich
24	FW	SSD	Osman Abdullah Osman
22	FW	SSD	Simon Anthony Justin
20	DF	SSD	Rushdi Hassan Santino
23	GK	SDN	Abdlhakeem Ahmed Nagam
28	GK	SSD	Michael Marko Magut
26	DF	SSD	Emmanuel Thomas Karembi
17	FW	SSD	Maker Makuei Amaal

=== Out on loan ===
Note: Flags indicate national team as defined under FIFA eligibility rules; some limited exceptions apply. Players may hold more than one non-FIFA nationality.

No.	Pos.	Nation	Player

== Grounds ==
Wau Stadium
- Wau City Stadium
- Full name: Wau Stadium
- Location: Wau, South Sudan
- Capacity: 9,000
- Surface: Grass

Construction
- Built: 1996–1997
- Opened: 23 July 1997
- Renovated: 2005

Salaam Wau FC formerly played their home games at their own Wau Stadium, club relocated to Juba Stadium.
