= 2019 South Sudan National Cup =

Tournament details
- Country: South Sudan

Final positions
- Champions: Amarat United

The 2019 South Sudan National Cup is the 7th edition of the South Sudan National Cup, the knockout football competition of South Sudan. It was played between 4 and 18 March 2019.

== Group stage ==
A total of 14 teams participate in the competition. They were divided into four groups based in different cities. The winners of each group (in bold) advance to the semi-finals.

- Group A (in Juba): – **Amarat United FC**, Youngster FC Torit, Al Salam FC Bor, City FC Yei
- Group B (in Wau) – **Al-Hilal FC Wau**, Merikh FC Aweil, Tiger FC Kuajok, Malakia FC Rumbek
- Group C (in Renk) – Al-Fuhud FC Renk, Gaib Alassad FC Melut, **Jil Salam FC Malakal**
- Group D (in Yambio) – **Super Eagle FC Yambio**, Gbutala FC Maridi, Nursery FC Mundri

== Knockout stage ==
=== Semi-finals ===
The semi-finals were originally to be played on 17 March, and the final to be played on 21 March. The semi-finals were originally to be:

- Amarat United FC v Jil Salam FC Malakal
- Al-Hilal FC Wau v Super Eagle FC Yambio

However, as neither Al-Hilal FC Wau nor Super Eagle FC Yambio travelled to Juba, the South Sudan Football Association disqualified both teams, and the remaining two teams, Amarat United FC and Jil Salam FC Malakal, would play in the final.

=== Final ===
The final was played on 18 March at the Juba Stadium in Juba.

Amarat United FC 12–0 Jil Salam FC Malakal

The cup winner qualifies for the 2019–20 CAF Confederation Cup.
