= Red Army FC =

Red Army F.C.
- Full name: Red Army Football Club
- Nickname(s): The Victorious
- Founded: 15 December 2013; 11 years ago
- Ground: Aweil Stadium
- Capacity: 1,500
- President: Jacob Garang
- Head Coach: Kotsy Dhieu
- League: South Sudan Premier League
- 2020: 5th place
Home colours	Away colours

Red Army Football Club, is a South Sudanese sporting club cored in Aweil, South Sudan; it plays in South Sudan Premier League (SSPL).

== History ==
Since Red Army came to being on December 15, 2013, it first faced the toughest games which promoted it to the second division initially, but as of 2016; it consolidated its strength that promoted it to the first division. Its president is Jacob Garang who is also the founder of Red Army.

As of 2016, on November 1, Red Army was knocked out by military club in penalties 4–3.

== Other websites ==
- Redarmy.com
