= Mathew Thomas Jacob =

South Sudanese footballer

Thomas Jacob
Personal information
- Full name: Mathew Thomas Jacob
- Position: Midfielder

Team information
- Current team: Al-Malakia FC

Senior career*
Years	Team	Apps	(Gls)
- Al-Malakia FC

International career
2012–	South Sudan	4	(0)
- * Club domestic league appearances and goals as of 29 November 2012

Thomas Jacob is a South Sudanese footballer who currently plays as a midfielder.

== International career ==
He has made at least two senior appearances for South Sudan against Ethiopia and Kenya in the 2012 CECAFA Cup.
