= Augustino Maduot Parek =

South Sudanese football administrator

Augustino Maduot Parek is the President of South Sudan Football Association (SSFA). Mr. Parek was elected the new head of South Sudan Football Association in July 2021 during the association's general elections.

Parek who is also an ex-military officer with the South Sudan People's Defense Force promised to unite the country and bring a positive atmosphere into the sports sector in the country. In August 2021 just a month after winning the general elections, he pledged a reward to the country's under23 national after they represented South Sudan in Ethiopia in the CECAFA Championship.
