= Charles Udwar Ukech =

South Sudanese politician

- Udwar
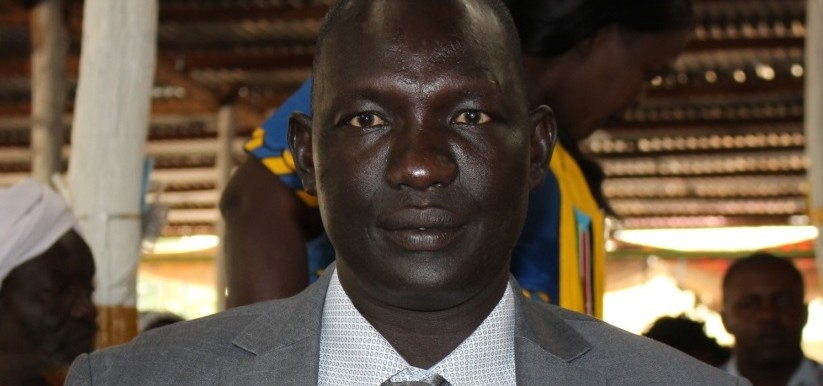

Speaker of the Eastern Equatoria State Transitional Legislative Assembly
- In office 8 April 2024 – 22 September 2026
- President: Salva Kiir

Personal details
- Party: Sudan People's Liberation Movement (SPLM)
- Occupation: Politician

Charles Udwar Ukech is a South Sudanese politician and member of the Sudan People's Liberation Movement (SPLM). He served as Speaker of the Eastern Equatoria State Transitional Legislative Assembly from April 2024 until September 2026. His tenure ended following the dissolution of South Sudan's transitional state governments and legislative assemblies by President Salva Kiir on 22 September 2026.

== Political career ==
=== Appointment as Speaker ===
Ukech was appointed Speaker of the Eastern Equatoria State Legislative Assembly by President Salva Kiir in 2024, replacing Sarafino Maira Jamus. The appointment was announced in a presidential decree as part of a wider reshuffle of state officials and legislators.

Ukech was sworn in as Speaker in Torit in April 2024. In his inaugural remarks, he emphasized inclusiveness, dialogue and respect among members of the assembly.

=== Legislative activities ===
In September 2024, Ukech issued an order reshuffling several heads and deputy heads of specialized committees of the Eastern Equatoria State Transitional Legislative Assembly. The changes included the replacement of the SPLM Party chief whip and several committee leaders.

In February 2025, Ukech participated in efforts to address intercommunal conflict and cattle migration affecting Eastern Equatoria. Following a stakeholder forum involving national and state officials and representatives of communities and civil society, he reported that fifteen resolutions had been adopted. The resolutions included measures relating to disarmament, compensation for destroyed property and the return of abducted people and livestock.

In February 2025, as the state assembly began a three-month recess, Ukech called for action to address violence in parts of Eastern Equatoria. He condemned attacks involving the destruction of homes and farms and called on security agencies to protect affected communities.

In January 2026, Ukech addressed newly appointed caretaker county commissioners in Eastern Equatoria, urging them to focus on peace and stability and to carry out their responsibilities as the country prepared for elections.

In June 2026, Ukech again addressed newly confirmed county commissioners and other state officials in Eastern Equatoria, urging them to uphold the constitution, prioritize public service and contribute to a peaceful political environment ahead of elections.

In August 2026, Ukech represented state assembly speakers during consultations concerning the proposed establishment of a national Speakers' Forum. The proposed forum was intended to strengthen cooperation between the national legislature and state legislative assemblies and to address operational challenges affecting state legislatures.

=== End of tenure ===
Ukech's tenure as Speaker ended on 22 September 2026 when President Salva Kiir dissolved South Sudan's transitional government and associated legislative institutions.

The presidential order dissolved the Transitional National Legislature, the governments and legislative assemblies of the country's ten states, and authorities in the three administrative areas. A caretaker administration was subsequently established to oversee government affairs ahead of the planned general elections on 22 December 2026.

Following the dissolution, Ukech was subsequently described by Radio Tamazuj as the former Speaker of the Eastern Equatoria State Transitional Legislative Assembly during the SPLM's election campaign activities in Torit on 30 September 2026.

== Capacity-building and peacebuilding engagements ==
Ukech participated in capacity-building activities supported by the United Nations Mission in South Sudan (UNMISS). The programmes focused on leadership, legislative responsibilities, conflict mitigation, constitutional processes and peacebuilding.

In July 2025, UNMISS reported that lawmakers in Eastern Equatoria had participated in training intended to strengthen their ability to address intercommunal violence through legislation and peacebuilding strategies. Ukech said the training had contributed to the legislature's ability to fulfil its responsibilities and to its commitment to good governance.

Ukech also participated in peace and community dialogue activities addressing conflict, youth involvement in violence and reconciliation in Eastern Equatoria.

== Football administration ==
Before becoming Speaker, Ukech served as Vice President of the South Sudan Football Association (SSFA). He was elected to the position in July 2021, winning 21 of 37 votes in the vice-presidential election. He served alongside newly elected SSFA president Augustino Maduot Parek.

Ukech had also previously served on the SSFA board and headed its finance committee, according to reporting on the 2021 federation elections.

During his tenure as SSFA vice president, Ukech participated in football development and federation partnership activities. In 2021, Tristar Group reported a contribution of US$100,000 to support the South Sudan national football programme, with Ukech receiving the symbolic cheque on behalf of the SSFA.
