= Merreikh Aweil FC =

- Full name: Merreikh Aweil Football Club
- Nickname(s): The Mars, The Home Owners, The Reds
- Founded: 3 February 1982; 43 years ago
- Ground: Aweil Stadium
- Capacity: 1,500
- President: ?
- Head Coach: ?
- League: South Sudan Premier League
- 2023: TBA
Home colours	Away colours

Merreikh Aweil Football Club is a South Sudanese federation football club based in Aweil, South Sudan. It plays at Aweil Stadium which is currently known as Madane Horia (which is translated, "Pitch of Freedom"). The word Merreikh means The Mars in the Arabic language.

They share a fierce rivalry with Salaam Aweil FC in Aweil. The games between Merreikh Aweil FC and Salaam Aweil FC are known as Aweilian Derbi.

== Club history ==
Merreikh Aweil FC was founded by Aweilians on 3 February 1982 and it became a beloved team by Aweilians. In 2012 when they were included to become first-division to play South Sudan Premier League, South Sudan National Cup and South Sudan Football Championship, they faced Al-Nahda Bentiu FC in their first match. Merreikh Aweil FC defeats Al Nahda Bentiu FC (2–1) in the first-round of South Sudan's league and they went to semi-finals in Juba. It is one of the successful teams of South Sudan. And also Merreikh Aweil lost to Salaam Aweil FC 2–1 in South Sudan Premier League (SSPL).

They are three times winners of the Aweilian league.

=== Honours ===
- 3 Cups of Aweilian League (AL)

2009–2010 2010–2011 2011–2012

== See also ==
=== The sale of Kuach Kamon ===
In the year of 2014, Merreikh Aweil sold its all times defender Kuach Kamon to Al-Merreikh Juba.

=== Wol Bak ===
In June 2015 Merreikh Aweil transferred its number 10, Wol Bak, to Al-Merreikh Juba.
