= Adnan Nan =

South Sudanese footballer

Personal information
- Full name: Adnan Nan
- Date of birth: 20 November 1979 (age 46)
- Position: Midfielder

Senior career*
Years	Team	Apps	(Gls)
- El Nasir

International career
2012–	South Sudan	2	(0)
- * Club domestic league appearances and goals as of 29 November 2012

Adnan Nan is a South Sudanese footballer who currently plays as a midfielder.

== International career ==
He has made at least two senior appearances for South Sudan against Ethiopia and Kenya in the 2012 CECAFA Cup.
