= Manasé Bezara =

Malagasy politician

Manasé Bezara (born September 23, 1959, in Anosibe Moramanga) is a Malagasy politician. He is a member of the Senate of Madagascar for Antsinanana and is a member of the Tiako i Madagasikara party.
