= Hassein Ismail =

South Sudanese footballer

Personal information
- Full name: Hassein Ismail
- Position: Defender

International career
Years	Team	Apps	(Gls)
2012–	South Sudan	1	(0)

Hassein Ismail is a South Sudanese footballer who currently plays as a defender.

== International career ==
He mas made one senior appearances for South Sudan against Kenya in the 2012 CECAFA Cup.
