= Sylvester Madut Abraham =

South Sudanese educationalist (born 1933)

- Born: 2 March 1933 (age 93); Wanyjok, Anglo-Egyptian Sudan
- Other name: Rinytiny
- Citizenship: South Sudanese
- Occupations: Peace Process; Educationist
- Years active: 1990—present
- Known for: Peaceful Co-existence
- Title: Director General Teacher

Sylvester Madut Abraham Ayuel Kiir (born 2 March 1933), professionally known as Sylvester Madut Abraham, also known as Madut Aluk, is a South Sudanese educationist who taught in many schools in the United Sudan. He served as an educational director-general of the Ministry of Education of Aweil in 2010.

Sylvester attended the graduation ceremony of the Teacher Training Centre on 6 December 2006, which was organised by the Ananda Marga Universal Relief Team (AMURT). He had been working with AMURT in Malualkhon, Wanyjok, South Sudan.
