= Jamus SC =

Association football club in South Sudan

Jamus
- Full name: Jamus Sport, Social & Cultural Club
- Short name: JSC
- Founded: 2009
- President: Mohannad Ahmed
- Head coach: Saber Ben Jabria
- League: South Sudan Premier League
- 2025–26: SSPL, 2nd
- Website: jamusfc.com
Home colours	Away colours

Jamus SC, known simply as Jamus, is a professional football club from Juba, South Sudan. They won the South Sudan Premier League in 2025, which qualified them for the 2025–26 CAF Champions League.

== See also ==
- Football in South Sudan
