= Zachariah Atinasio =

South Sudanese footballer

Personal information
- Full name: Zachariah Atinasio
- Position: Defender

International career
Years	Team	Apps	(Gls)
2012–	South Sudan	2	(0)

Zachariah Atinasio is a South Sudanese footballer who currently plays as a defender.

== International career ==
He has made at least two senior appearances for South Sudan against Ethiopia and Kenya in the 2012 CECAFA Cup.
