= Fabrice Twagizimana =

Burkinabé footballer

Personal information
- Date of birth: October 8, 1990 (age 36)
- Place of birth: Kigali, Rwanda
- Height: 1.70 m (5 ft 7 in)
- Position: Defensive midfielder

Team information
- Current team: Étoile de l'Est

Senior career*
Years	Team	Apps	(Gls)
2009–2018	Police		
2019–	Étoile de l'Est		

International career
2012–2014	Rwanda	20	(0)
- * Club domestic league appearances and goals

Fabrice Twagizimana (born 8 October 1990) is a Rwandan footballer who plays as a defensive midfielder for Étoile de l'Est.
