= Aweil Stars FC =

Aweil Stars F.C.
- Full name: Aweil Stars Football Club
- Nickname(s): The Constellations
- Founded: 16 May 1999; 25 years ago
- Ground: Aweil Stadium
- Capacity: 1,500
- President: Robert Majok
- Head Coach: Yai Tong
- League: South Sudan Premier League
- 2023: TBA
Home colours	Away colours

Aweil Stars Football Club is a South Sudanese federation football club commonly known as Aweil Stars or Aweil, mostly based in Aweil, South Sudan. They perform at Aweil Stadium. They play in the South Sudan Premier League, South Sudan National Cup and South Sudan Football Championship. Aweil Stars FC are one of the victorious teams of Northern Bhar el Ghazal, and they are winners of South Sudan National Cup

== Club history ==
Since its inception in 1999 (Aweil Stars was founded on 16 May 1999, and declared an official, independent team), the club gradually consolidated its power; as commensurate with their performances, they were inaugurated into the membership of South Sudan Premier League (SSPL) in 2013. Aweil Stars lost a match against Salaam Aweil that ended 5–2 at Aweil Stadium. And on 21 July 2015 Aweil Stars crowned champions by beating Salaam Aweil on penalties on Saturday evening, in the presence of state governor Salva Chol Ayat. In April 2016 Aweil Stars was defeated 1–2 by Islah in Aweil State qualification for South Sudan Cup. Aweil Stars FC team scored their first goal in the first half of the game but a stricker from Islah John Dog made it end with 2 goals in the second half of the game. After the match, Islah FC earned donations of £10,000 SSP from the governor, £3,000 SSP from the state legislative assembly, and £3,000 SSP from the Wanyjokish government.

=== Honours ===
Cup League (1)
2014–2015
