= Kuzgbour Dak =

South Sudanese footballer

Personal information
- Full name: Kuzgbour Dak
- Position: Midfielder

International career
Years	Team	Apps	(Gls)
2012–	South Sudan	2	(0)

Kuzgbour Dak is a South Sudanese footballer who currently plays as a midfielder.

== International career ==
He has made two senior appearances for South Sudan against Ethiopia and Kenya in the 2012 CECAFA Cup.
