= Deo Bonaventure Munishi =

Tanzanian footballer

Personal information
- Full name: Deogratias Bonaventure Munishi
- Date of birth: 6 April 1989 (age 37)
- Place of birth: Marangu, Tanzania
- Height: 1.81 m (5 ft 11 in)
- Position: Goalkeeper

Team information
- Current team: Lipuli

Senior career*
Years	Team	Apps	(Gls)
2007–2010	Simba		
2010–2011	Al-Ittihad Club		
2011–2012	Mtibwa Sugar		
2012–2013	Azam		
2013–2017	Young Africans		
2017–2018	Pretoria University	8	(0)
2018–2019	Simba		
2019–	Lipuli		

International career^{‡}
2009–2017	Tanzania	21	(0)
- * Club domestic league appearances and goals as of 25 April 2021 ‡ National team caps and goals as of 25 April 2021

Deo Bonaventure Munishi (born 6 April 1989) is a Tanzanian football goalkeeper who plays for Lipuli. He was a squad member for the 2008 CECAFA Cup and the 2015 COSAFA Cup.
