= Ramadhan Singano =

Tanzanian footballer (born 1993)

Personal information
- Full name: Ramadhan Suzana Yahaya Singano
- Date of birth: 4 March 1993
- Place of birth: Tanzania
- Positions: Midfielder; winger; striker

Senior career*
Years	Team	Apps	(Gls)
2011–2015	Simba		
2015–2019	Azam		
2019–2020	TP Mazembe		
2020–2021	Nkana		
2021–2022	TP Mazembe		

International career
2012–2015	Tanzania	10	(0)
- * Club domestic league appearances and goals

Ramadhan Suzana Yahaya Singano (born March 4, 1993) is a Tanzanian footballer who last played as a midfielder, winger, or striker for TP Mazembe.

== Early life ==
Singano's birthdate has been listed as December 31, 1992.

== Career ==
Singano played for Tanzanian side Simba.

== Style of play ==
Singano operates as a midfielder, winger, or striker and is known for his dribbling ability.

== Personal life ==
Singano is nicknamed "Messi".
