= Saadiq Abdikadir Mohamed =

Somali footballer (born 1996)

Personal information
- Date of birth: 15 January 1996 (age 30)
- Place of birth: Nakuru, Kenya
- Height: 1.93 m (6 ft 4 in)
- Positions: Midfielder; forward

Youth career
- 2015: Dallas

College career
Years	Team	Apps	(Gls)
2016–2017	Saint Louis Billikens	22	(5)
2018–2020	Bradley Braves	15	(0)

Senior career*
Years	Team	Apps	(Gls)
2012	Banadir		
2013–2014	Leopards	1	(0)

International career^{‡}
- Kenya U17
2012	Somalia U17		
2012–2013	Somalia	5	(0)
- * Club domestic league appearances and goals as of 12:57, 18 March 2021 (UTC) ‡ National team caps and goals as of 12:57, 15 January 2019 (UTC)

Saadiq Abdikadir Mohamed (born 15 January 1996) is a Somali footballer.

== Early life ==
Mohamed was born in Nakuru, Kenya, in 1996 to a Somali mother. His father died when he was young, and he spent time in both Kenya and Somalia during his childhood. He played football in both countries, for Banadir in Somalia, and for A.F.C. Leopards in Kenya.

== Club career ==
=== Early career ===
During his time in Somalia, he was targeted along with many others, by terrorist group Al-Shabaab, simply for playing football. After a surprise African youth championship qualification victory over Sudan, Mohamed gave a post-match interview in which he appeared to question Al-Shabaab, and asked for more peace in Somalia - to which he received numerous death threats. Two months before this game, a teammate of his had been killed, having been attacked after staying behind after training for extra practice with Mohamed.

After his interview, Mohamed moved back to Kenya, and signed with Kenyan Premier League side A.F.C. Leopards. While in Kenya, he was arrested several times - all without the police filing charges, to try and elicit bribe money from family members. Because of this, his contract with the Leopards was terminated.

=== Move to America ===
Having no club to play for, and no place to safely live without persecution, Mohamed travelled to the United States, where a friend had been granted asylum. His friend helped him compile a highlight reel for potential new clubs, and he jumped around the country trialling with various university sides. While staying in Texas, FC Dallas gave him a chance and he spent some time with their academy. Eventually the Saint Louis University offered him a place on their roster. During his time in America, he stayed with the sister of journalist J.R. Biersmith, who had been documenting Mohamed's struggle as a footballer under the Al-Shabaab regime.

=== Collegiate soccer ===
Mohamed had a very successful first year with the Saint Louis Billikens, earning an A-10 All-Rookie team selection, as well as twice earning A-10 Rookie of the Week honours. In his two years at Saint Louis University, Mohamed totalled twenty-two appearances and five goals.

During this time, J.R. Biersmith finished his documentary on Mohamed, titled Men in the Arena, and it was released in 2017. The documentary focused on Mohamed and fellow Somali footballer Sa'ad Hussein, and their struggles with playing football in a country ravaged by civil war.

In February 2018, the Saint Louis University reneged on their promise of a full scholarship for Mohamed, and so he decided to transfer to the Bradley University in Peoria, Illinois. He racked up twelve appearances in 2018 for the Braves, but was redshirted during the 2019 season, and only managed to feature in three games in his last season.

He graduated with honours in 2020, having been approved for asylum in the United States the previous year.

== Career statistics ==
=== International ===
As of matches played 15 January 2019.

National team	Year	Apps	Goals
Somalia	2012	2	0
Somalia	2013	3	0
Total		5	0
