= Stève Nzigamasabo =

Burundian footballer (born 1990)

Personal information
- Date of birth: 10 December 1990 (age 35)
- Place of birth: Bujumbura, Burundi
- Height: 1.69 m (5 ft 7 in)
- Position: Midfielder

Team information
- Current team: KMC

Senior career*
Years	Team	Apps	(Gls)
2010–2013	Vital'O		
2013	Enugu Rangers		
2014–2015	Vital'O		
2014	Sofapaka		
2016–2017	Vital'O		
2017–2019	Bugesera		
2019–2022	Namungo		
2022-	KMC		

International career^{‡}
2011–2015	Burundi	10	(0)
- * Club domestic league appearances and goals as of 1 August 2020 ‡ National team caps and goals as of 1 August 2020

Stève Nzigamasabo (born 10 December 1990) is a Burundian footballer who plays as a midfielder for KMC.
