= Nile Eagle FC =

- Full name: Nile Eagle Football Club
- Founded: 1996
- Ground: Nimule
Home colours	Away colours

Nile Eagle Football Club is a South Sudanese football club located in Nimule, South Sudan
