= El Nasir FC =

Football club in South Sudan

- Full name: El Nasir Football Club
- Founded: 1947
- Ground: Juba Stadium, South Sudan
- Capacity: 7,000
Home colours

El Nasir Football Club, also known as Nasir FC or Nasir FC Juba, is a national football club owned by South Sudan Police founded in 1947. It won the inaugural South Sudan Cup in 2012, and was the first to represent South Sudan in the CAF Confederation Cup the same year.

Nasir FC based in the city of Juba and affiliated to Juba Local Football Association, SSFA, CECAFA, CAF, and FIFA. Nasir football Club was established as police football club which was by then under the police administration. the club was affiliated to the Sudan football Association as a member club of Juba Local Football Association that represented the Southern region of the Sudan in general and the Equatorial region in particular. When Southern Sudan gained its independence in 2011, South Sudan Football Association was admitted in CAF and FIFA respectively in 2012, Thus, automatically Nasir FC fell under the new SSFA. By the early 1950s, the police handed the club administration to the civilians while supporting the club from distance with the little finances they can afford in order for the club to run their affairs. In accordance with Nasir FA Statue, the club is run by the Board of Directors with its president as the head of the administration, supported by club CEO which is known commonly as the Secretary. From 1947 up to date, the club had more than 15 presidents. However, because Nasir FC do not have clear details of its former Presidents who served the club due to the situation in which the Southern Sudan was in, the records of those Presidents who have reigned in the club in the past eight decades might not be officially documented.

The club's Presidents that are known in its history are the following: Osman Mahani the founder of Police football club, whose notable contribution was the construction of the police club in the heart of Juba town, Colonel John Akot, Lagu whose second name is not known, Major general Ajang Riek, Lt. Gen. Nikolas Dimo, Mr. Joseph Sabit, Makelele, Mr. Solomon Lago Odosi, Mr. Emmanuel Benjamin Oyik, and lastly Mr. Yohanis Musa Pouk - the current Nasir FC President (Former Vice President of South Sudan Football Association) who was elected to the office in the year 2022.

== Achievements ==
ironic notoriety of the club came in 1971 when President Nimer flew to Chad. While there, a rumor spread by Radio Omdurman that a coup took place in Khartoum by colonel Hassim Al Atah. Radio Omdurman had technical problems so it could not be confirmed. It was Radio Juba which confirmed that the coup did not take place in Khartoum. Later in 1971 Juba local football association had organized a football match for the welcoming of the president from Chad where he would publicly address South Sudan. The organizers of the event selected the top two teams to contest, Malakia and Nasir. Nasir would defeat Malakia soccer club, 2-1.

Being the top team in the Southern region in 1975 Nasir football club was invited to a friendly match organised by the late President Nimeri. Nasir defeated Al Merik of Sudan, 2-1.

Nasir FC has been successful during the old Sudan of which they went to Rapp up three trophies during that period which the years are not fully detailed in the records. In 1976 the top two teams Nasir and Kator were brought together to play in a match organized by Juba local football Association in welcoming the president once again and this game between Nasir and Kator went on successfully in favor of the Mighty Nasir as they beat Kator 2-0. The first game organized for welcoming the president came in 1971 as mentioned earlier on which means any game organized by welcoming the president of the country Nasir became the first team in history to feature both, and the Nasir FC won both of those games. the first was against Malakia SC in 1971 of which Nasir emerged victorious and the second game in 1976 also went in favor of Nasir FC. When Sudan was still one country, the club was successful for five consecutive years from the year 2001 to 2005, the team won all the Juba local football leagues for five consecutive years, which no team in the history of Juba local football Association has ever won five consecutive titles. As such, Nasir FC is the first club in history to have ever achieved that in history of Juba Local Football Association.

== Performance in CAF competitions ==
As football was still developing under the new South Sudan Football Association (SSFA) in which Nasir became affiliated to, the team's notable success came in the first year of South Sudan's existence by becoming the first team to lift the South Sudan local league in Juba and first club to do so in the South Sudan cup Nationally by beating Meriek Renk.

The team looked forward for the continental showdowns, the CAF Confederation Cup which is the second tire football competition after the CAF Champions League, Nasir football club became the first team in the history of South Sudan to play in CAF Confederation's cup. Remember the CAF Confederation Cup, known as the TotalEnergies CAF Confederation Cup for sponsorship purposes, is an annual association football club competition established in 2004 from a merger of the CAF Cup and the African Cup Winners' Cup and organized by Confederation of African Football (CAF). And during draws in the year 2012 Nasir football club were pitted against Azam football club of Tanzania during the preliminary playoffs in which they went on to lose to the Tanzania-based team. In 2012, Nasir won the first ever South Sudan National Cup over El-Meriekh.
