= South Sudan Football Association =

Governing body of association football in South Sudan

CAF
- Founded: 2011
- Headquarters: Juba, South Sudan
- FIFA affiliation: 25 May 2012
- CAF affiliation: 10 February 2012
- CECAFA affiliation: 9 May 2012
- President: Augustino Maduot Parek
- Vice-President: Charles Udwar Ukech

The South Sudan Football Association (S.S.F.A.) is the governing body of football in South Sudan. It was established in April 2011 and is an affiliate of CECAFA, CAF and FIFA.

In club football, the SSFA oversee the South Sudan Football Championship, South Sudan Premier League, the national cup and Super Cup.

== Formation and history ==
In April 2011, the Government of South Sudan's (GOSS) minister for Youth, Sports and Recreation, Makuac Teny Youk issued a ministerial order establishing the Provisional Football Association.

The association was in office for one year and managed, promoted and supervised football affairs in South Sudan. It was led by Oliver Mori Benjamin as President, Doub Foj Jok as Vice President, Rudolf Andera Oujika as Secretary General, and Jaden Jada Solomon as the Treasurer. It had a total of 17 members. In May 2011, Malesh Soro was appointed as the first manager of the South Sudan national football team.

In April 2012, Chabur Goc Alei replaced Oliver Mori Benjamin as President of the South Sudan Football Association.

=== Membership of CAF, CECAFA and FIFA ===
In February 2011, speaking of the possibility of South Sudan joining CAF, the CAF president Issa Hayatou said: "...we are readying up with the idea of having a new member. We will send a delegation to study the situation and our actions will emanate from their report."

On 8 February 2012, CAF published their Congress Agenda which stated that CAF members would discuss the "Proposal for admission of the South Sudan Football Association (SSFA) as a member". Two days later, CAF welcomed South Sudan to its membership. On 9 May, South Sudan joined CECAFA.

On 25 May 2012, FIFA members approved of South Sudan becoming a member, 176 FIFA members voted in total, only 4 voted against South Sudan joining FIFA.

In June 2017, Francis Amin was elected as New President of the South Sudan Football Association.

On 22 July 2021 Augustino Maduot Parek was elected President of South Sudan Football Association, replacing Francis Amin for the next four years till 2025.

== Competitions ==
=== Men ===
Professional leagues

- South Sudan Football Championship
- South Sudan Premier League

Cups

- South Sudan National Cup
- South Sudan Super Cup

== Presidents ==
A term generally lasts four years.

Rank	Name	Period
1	Oliver Mori Benjamin (first term)	2011
2	Chabur Goc Alei (first term)	2012–2017
3	Francis Amin (first term)	2017–2021
4	Augustino Maduot Parek (first term)	2021–present
