= El Merriekh Bentiu =

- Full name: El Merriekh SC Bentiu
- Founded: 1962
- Ground: Juba Stadium, South Sudan
- Capacity: 12,000
- League: South Sudan Premier League
Home colours	Away colours

El Merriekh Bentiu is a South Sudanese football club located in Juba, South Sudan which currently plays in the South Sudan Premier League.

== Stadium ==
Currently the team plays at the 12000 capacity Juba Stadium.

== Honours ==
- South Sudan Football Championship: 1

2024

- South Sudan National Cup: 2

2018, 2023

== Performance in CAF competitions ==
- CAF Confederation Cup: 1 appearance

2018/19 - Preliminary round

- CAF Confederation Cup: 2 appearance

2023/2024 - Preliminary round/second preliminary round

- CAF Champions League

2026/2027 - in progress
