= Wau Stadium =

Football stadium in South Sudan

- Interactive map of Wau Stadium
- Location: Wau, South Sudan
- Coordinates: 7.72°N 27.99°E
- Capacity: 5,000

Construction
- Closed: 2017

Tenant
- Wau Salaam FC

Wau Stadium is a soccer specific stadium in Wau, South Sudan. It is home to Wau Salaam FC.

On 1 November 2017, after a wind storm nearly destroyed the stadium, Wau governor Angelo Taban announced a call for engineers and technicians to design a new stadium, while demolishing the old one.
