= Yohannes Tilahun =

Eritrean footballer

Yohannes Tilahun (born 16 October 1993) is an Eritrean footballer. He currently plays for the Eritrea national football team.

== International career ==
Tilahun played in the 2009 CECAFA Cup in Kenya, appearing in the 2–1 group match defeat to Rwanda.
