= Makuac Teny Youk =

South Sudanese politician

Makuac Teny Youk is a South Sudanese politician. He was the former Minister for Youth, Sports and Recreation in the Cabinet of South Sudan. He was appointed to that position on 10 July 2011, and served until 2013.
