= Atlabara FC =

- Full name: Atlabara Football Club
- Nickname: Bara Boys
- Founded: 1967
- Ground: Juba Stadium, Juba, South Sudan
- Capacity: 7,000
- League: South Sudan Football Championship
- 2025–26: 7th
Home colours

Atlabara Football Club (Arabic: نادي أطلع برة لكرة القدم), commonly known as Atlabara FC, is a professional association football club based in Juba, South Sudan. The club competes in the South Sudan Premier League (SSPL), the top tier of football in the country.

Founded in 1967, Atlabara is widely regarded as one of the most successful and historically significant football clubs in South Sudan. The club rose to national prominence after South Sudan's independence in 2011, becoming one of the dominant forces in domestic competitions.

== History ==
=== Early years (1967–2010) ===
Atlabara FC was established in 1967 in Juba during the period when South Sudan was part of Sudan. The club developed a strong local following and became known for its competitive spirit and youth development focus. During this period, Atlabara participated in regional competitions and informal leagues, building a foundation for future success.

=== Post-independence success (2011–present) ===
Following the independence of South Sudan in 2011, Atlabara FC quickly emerged as a dominant club in the newly formed national league system. The club won the inaugural major titles in the country, including the South Sudan Football Championship in 2013, marking a historic milestone.

Atlabara continued its domestic success by securing additional league titles in 2015 and 2019. The club also won the South Sudan National Cup in 2021, further solidifying its position as one of the top teams in the country.

The club has represented South Sudan in continental competitions organized by the Confederation of African Football (CAF), gaining valuable international experience despite facing early exits.

== Stadium ==
Atlabara FC plays its home matches at Juba Stadium, the primary football venue in South Sudan. The stadium has a seating capacity of approximately 7,000 and hosts major domestic and international matches, including fixtures involving the South Sudan national team.

== Club identity ==
=== Name and meaning ===
The name "Atlabara" (Arabic: اطلع برة) translates to "get out" in English. The name is believed to reflect a competitive and defiant spirit associated with the club’s identity and playing style.

=== Colours ===
The club’s traditional home colours consist of yellow shirts, blue shorts, and yellow socks. These colours have become a recognizable symbol of Atlabara FC in domestic competitions.

=== Nickname ===
The club is popularly known as the "Bara Boys" among supporters and in local football circles.

== Rivalries ==
Atlabara FC has developed rivalries with several clubs in South Sudan, particularly teams based in Juba. Matches between Atlabara and other top-tier clubs are often highly competitive and attract significant local attention. [citation needed]

== Honours ==
South Sudan Football Championship

  - Winners (3): 2013, 2015, 2019

South Sudan National Cup

  - Winners (1): 2021

== CAF competition appearances ==
CAF Champions League

  - 2014 – Preliminary Round
  - 2017 – Preliminary Round
  - 2019–20 – Preliminary Round

CAF Confederation Cup

  - 2022 – Preliminary Round

== Notable players ==
List of notable players to be added with reliable sources

== Management and staff ==
Information on current and past managers to be added

== Supporters ==
Atlabara FC enjoys a strong fan base in Juba and across South Sudan. The club’s supporters are known for their passionate backing during matches, particularly at Juba Stadium. [citation needed]

== See also ==
Football in South Sudan South Sudan Football Championship South Sudan national football team
