= Young Stars FC =

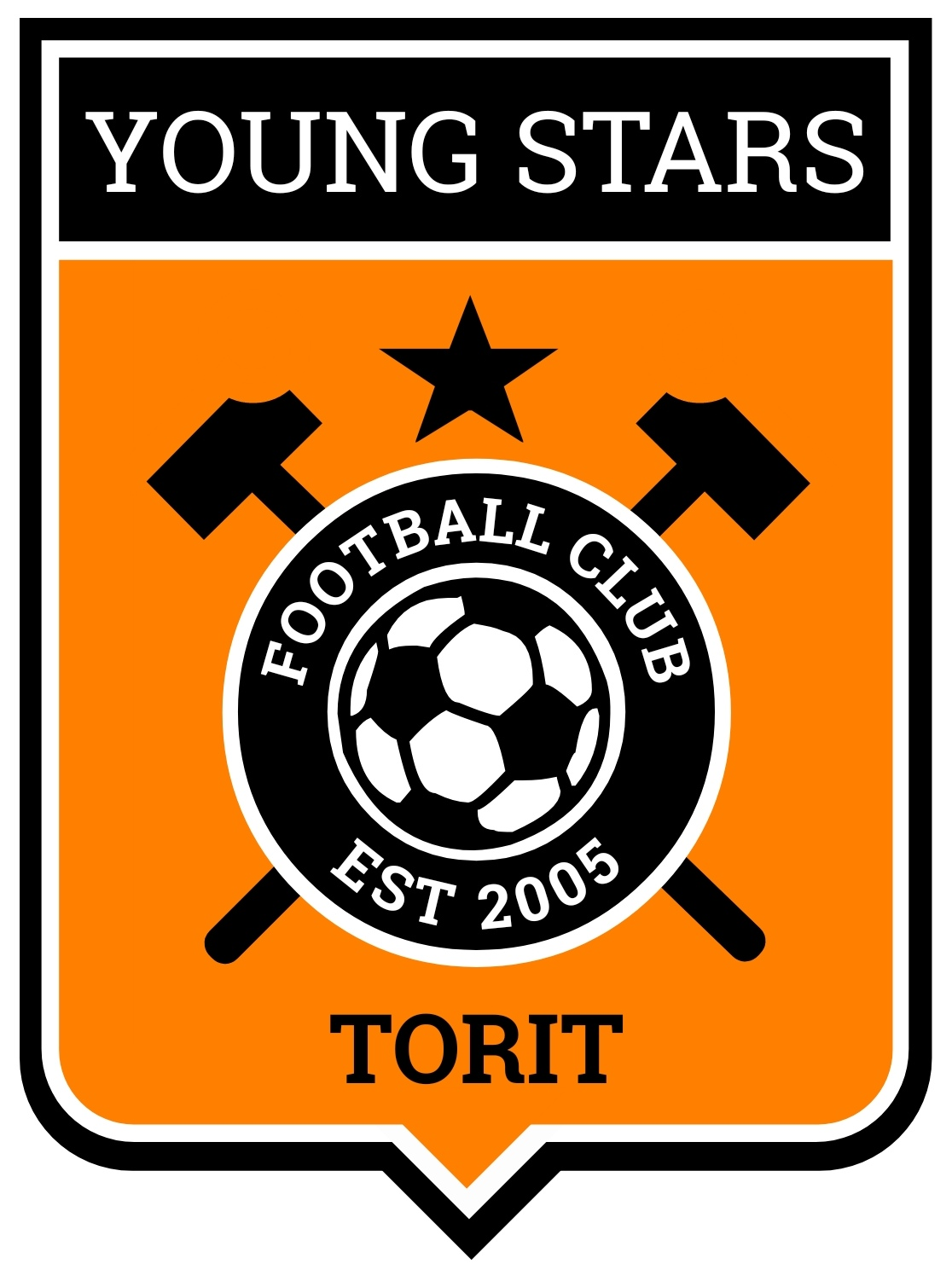
- Full name: Young Stars Football Club
- Nickname: The Hammers
- Founded: 2005
- Ground: Torit Freedom Square
- Capacity: N/A
- Owner: Torit
- Chairman: FR. Jovince Otimore
- Manager: Mario Abu Waraga
- League: South Sudan Premier League
Home colours	Away colours

Young Stars Football Club is a South Sudanese football Club located in Torit. They were among the inaugural 14 teams to take part in the first South Sudan Premier League season in 2024–25.

== History ==
The club was established in 2005 by Michael Osukari Aliardo together with other co-founders such as Simon Abaha Ateib known by Okoff. The team started sounding from 2011 when they were crowned champions of South Sudan Cup in Eastern Equatoria Torit during the time of Juda Ojazy Osuru the general secretary, Adam Ohoi the director, Samson Ohide the treasury and Martin Dowla deputy to Adam. Since 2011, this team remains the champion consecutively till date.

In November 2016, armed gunmen attacked their team bus, killing the driver and injuring six others. Among casualties were chairman Anthon Fermato the chairman of Torit Local Football Association (TLFA), defender James Jordan Ohitu, and club director Abuna Jovince Otimore.

While officiating a fixture in Torit Freedom Square, referee Haidar Moses collapsed on the pitch. He was taken to a nearby hospital where he was pronounced dead; the cause of death remains unknown. However, he was complaining of lethargy before the kick-off.

== Achievements ==
- South Sudan National Cup
  - Runners-up: 2016
- South Sudan Cup
  - Winners: 2013, 2015, 2016, 2019
- Torit Premier League
  - Winners: 2015, 2018
- Governor's Cup
  - Winners: 2014 2015
