= South Sudan National Cup =

- Organiser(s): South Sudan Football Association
- Founded: 2011; 15 years ago
- Region: South Sudan
- Teams: 24 (2024)
- International cup(s): CAF Champions League; CAF Confederation Cup
- Current champions: Jamus (2024)
- Most championships: Al-Malakia; Al-Merreikh; Wau Salaam (2 titles each)
- 2025 South Sudan National Cup

The South Sudan National Cup is an annual knockout association football competition in men's domestic South Sudanese football. Organized by the South Sudan Football Association, the cup began in 2012, not long after South Sudan gained independence.

== History ==
South Sudan gained its independence from the country of Sudan on July 9, 2011, after a referendum was passed into law. The South Sudan Football Association (SSFA) was formed in April 2011 and has gained membership of FIFA, CAF and CECAFA. Alongside the National Cup, SSFA runs domestic leagues, with the South Sudan Football Championship as the top division.

The first South Sudan National Cup was held in 2012 with eight teams entered in the competition. The first round of the competition was a two-legged quarterfinal knockout stage. The four quarterfinal winners, El Nasir FC, Akwachi Dit, El Meriekh and Merreikh Aweil FC, entered a semi-final stage. The semi-finals each consisted of a single match. On September 8, 2012, El Nasir FC beat Akwachi Dit 2–0. On September 9, El Meriekh beat Merreikh Aweil FC 1–0, and these teams went on to play in the final. On September 12, the Juba-based El Nasir FC beat the Renk-based El Meriekh 2–1 to win the title.

In 2013, the second edition of the South Sudan National Cup was held. Many more teams entered than in 2012, and the first round of the competition was divided into regions. Teams from the states of Central Equatoria, Upper Nile and Western Equatoria competed. Eventually, 16 teams progressed to the final stage. They were split into four groups, but two of the four did not play. From the group stage, four teams qualified for the semi-finals. They were: Al-Malakia FC (Juba), Ahli FC (Malakal), Salaam Aweil FC (Northern Bahr el Ghazal) and Amal Raja FC (Western Bahr el Ghazal). Al-Malakia FC beat Ahli FC in penalties and Salaam Aweil FC beat Amal Raja FC 3–2. In the final, Al-Malakia FC won 2–0 and qualified for the 2014 CAF Confederation Cup.

The 2014 South Sudan National Cup was contested by nine teams, divided into two groups. Teams from the states of Upper Nile, Unity and Jonglei did not compete due to conflicts in those areas. The teams were split into a Wau group and a Juba group. The eventual semi-finalists were Al-Malakia FC, Al-Ghazal FC (Wau), Eslah FC and Tahrir FC. Al-Ghazal FC and Al-Malakia FC won the semi-finals after winning 2–0 on aggregate and 6–3 on aggregate, respectively. Al-Malakia FC won the final held on Aug. 31, 2014, 1–0. By winning, Al-Malakia FC qualified for the 2015 CAF Champions League.

In 2015, the SSFA announced a new cup competition for domestic South Sudanese football. Sponsored by the MTN Group, the MTN8 Football Championship was held in 2015 and won by Al-Malakia FC.

In 2016, Wau Salaam FC won the South Sudan National Cup after beating Young Stars FC of Torit 3-0 in the final.

In 2017, Wau Salaam FC defended their title after beating Al-Hilal of Juba 5-4 on penalties (2-2 full time) in the final.

In 2018, Al-Merreikh Juba won the cup with a 2–0 win over Al-Ghazala.

In 2019, Amarat United defeated Jil Al-Salam 12–0. Two of the four semi-finalists Hilal FC (from Wau) and Super Eagles FC (Yambio) were removed from the competition for failing to travel to Juba.

== Finals ==
Year	Winner	Score	Runner-up
2012	El Nasir	2–1	Al Merreikh
2013	Al-Malakia	2–0	Salaam Aweil
2014	Al-Malakia	1–0	Al-Ghazal
2015	Not held (instead the MTN Cup was played)		
2016	Al-Salam	3–0	Young Stars
2017	Al-Salam	2–2 (aet; 5–4 pen.)	Al-Hilal Juba
2018	Al-Merreikh	2–0	Al-Ghazala
2019	Amarat United	12–0	Jil Al-Salam
2020	Al-Rabita	2–0	Nile City
2021	Atlabara	2–0	Al-Salam
2022	Al-Hilal	2–0	Zalan
2023	Al-Merreikh	2–0	Nujum al-Souma
2024	Jamus	1–1 (aet; 4–2 pen.)	Al-Merreikh
2025	Jamus	0–0 (aet; 4–2 pen.)	Al-Merreikh
