= Al Hilal FC (Wau) =

Al-Hilal FC
- Full name: Al-Hilal Wau Football Club
- Ground: Wau Stadium, Wau
- Capacity: 5,000
- League: South Sudan Premier League
Home colours	Away colours

Al Hilal Wau Football Club is a South Sudanese football club located in Wau, South Sudan, which currently plays in the South Sudan Premier League. They are among the first 14 teams that played the inauguration of South Sudan Premier League establishment as of season 2024–25 first edition.

The 5,000-capacity Wau Stadium is their home venue.

== Honours ==
- South Sudan Football Championship: 1

2018

- South Sudan National Cup: 1

2022
