= South Sudan Premier League =

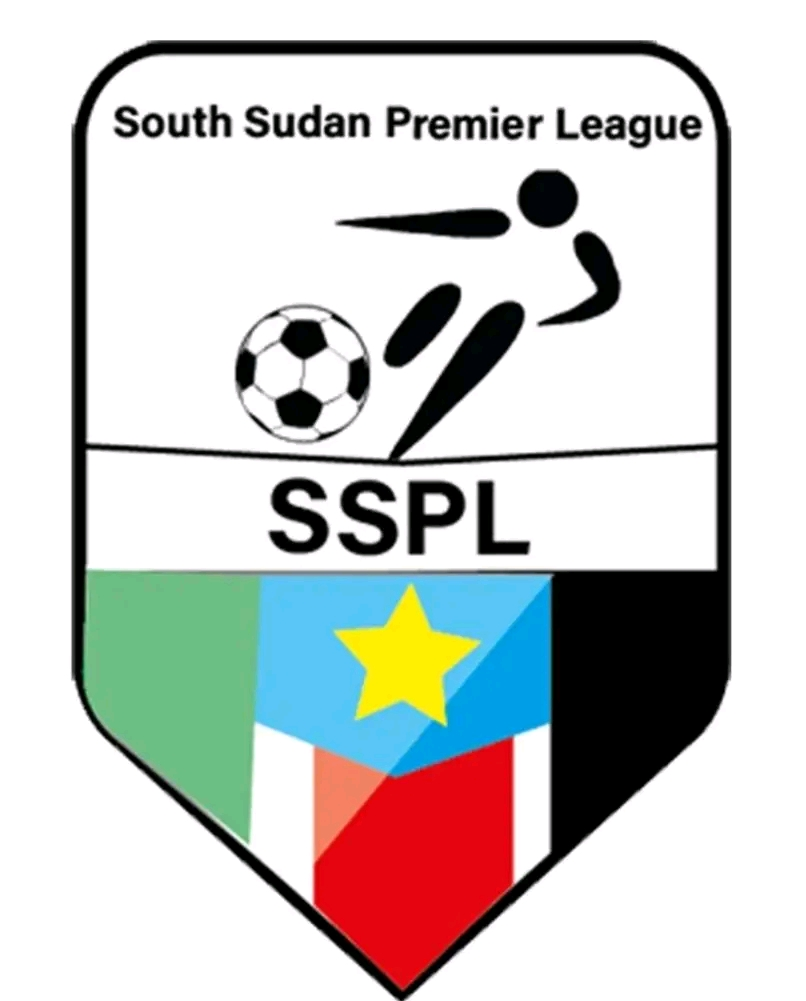
- Founded: 21 December 2024; 22 months ago
- Country: South Sudan
- Confederation: CAF
- Number of clubs: 14
- Level on pyramid: 1
- Relegation to: South Sudan National League
- Domestic cup: South Sudan National Cup
- League cup: South Sudan Super Cup
- International cup(s): CAF Champions league CAF Confederation Cup; African Football League
- Current champions: El-Merriekh Bentiu (1st Title)
- Sponsor: MTN South Sudan
- Current: 2026-27

The South Sudan Premier League (SSPL) is the top professional football league in South Sudan. Established in December 2024, it operates under the governance of the South Sudan Football Association (SSFA) and represents the highest tier in the South Sudan football pyramid.

== History ==
The league was officially inaugurated on 21 December 2024 at the Radisson Blue Hotel in Juba, South Sudan, marking the beginning of professional football in the nation.

The league's creation aims to elevate the standard of football in South Sudan, foster local talent, and provide opportunities for South Sudanese clubs to compete on international platforms such as the CAF Champions League and CAF Confederation Cup.

== League format ==
The South Sudan Premier League typically features 14 teams competing in a round-robin format. Each team plays 26 matches per season, with points awarded for wins and draws. The club with the most points at the end of the season is crowned champion.

Promotion and relegation occur between the Premier League and the second-tier league.

== Clubs ==
The first ever 14 clubs to participate in the inaugural 2024–25 South Sudan Premier League season.

Club	Town
Kator	Juba
Jamus	Juba
Al-Malakai	Juba
Bentiu City	Bentiu
El-Merriekh	Bentiu
Salaam Aweil	Aweil
Wajuma	Aweil
Al-Hilal	Wau
Koryom	Bor
Nile City	Yambio
Young Stars	Torit
Lion Hunters	Yei
Olympics	Renk
Holy Family	Rumbek

=== Current Clubs Champions ===
These are the current and previous South Sudan Premier League (SSPL) winners by clubs since the league was established.

Champions by Club
Club	winners	Runners	Winning seasons
El-Merriekh SC	1	0	2025/26
Jamus FC	1	1	2024/25

== 2024-25 standings ==
Pos	Club	Pld	W	D	L	GF	GA	GD	Pts	Avg. attendance	More
1	Jamus SC	26	21	5	0	89	19	+70	68	1,782	Champions
2	Kator FC	26	19	5	2	67	20	+47	62	1,592	
3	El-Merriekh	26	18	4	4	79	26	+53	58	1,413	
4	Holy Family FC	26	18	4	4	66	31	+35	58	526	
5	Koryom FC	26	14	4	8	53	48	+5	46	654	
6	Malakia SSCC	26	12	4	10	41	29	+12	40	1,217	
7	Wajuma SC	26	10	5	11	44	30	+14	35	396	
8	Salam FC	26	9	7	10	42	56	−14	34	447	
9	Al-Hilal FC	26	10	3	13	33	42	−9	33	224	
10	Olympic FC	26	7	2	17	28	60	−32	23	297	
11	Bentiu City SC	26	6	4	16	35	64	−29	22	277	
12	Lion Hunters FC	26	5	3	18	28	60	−32	18	231	
13	Young Stars FC	26	2	8	16	27	80	−53	14	177	Relegated
14	Nile City FC	26	1	2	23	31	98	−67	5	182	Relegated

Average league attendance: 673

== Achievement ==
The league winners earns qualification to represent South Sudan in continental competitions, such as CAF Champions League and CAF Confederation Cup, while the runners-up represents CAF confederation Cup.

== Sponsorship and Media ==
On 21 December 2024, MTN South Sudan was announced as the league sponsorship.

After a successful start of new inaugurated South Sudan Premier League matches, South Sudan Football Association and MTN South Sudan signed a historic 3-Year partnership worth USD $300,000. This was to support local talent and enhance player development.

Period	Sponsor	Name
2024 to 2027	MTN South Sudan	MTN South Sudan Premier League

== Top goalscorers ==
Season	Player	Team	Goals
2024-25	(Sudan) Christopher Kirrya	Koryom	24
2025-26	(Cameroon) George Rodrigue	Jamus SC	23

=== Multiple hat-tricks ===
Rank	Country	Player	Hat-tricks
1	(Cameroon)	George Rodrigue	4
2	(South Sudan)	Kerr Mangar	2

== See also ==
- South Sudan National Cup
- South Sudan Football Association
- South Sudan national football team
- South Sudan National League
