= Aweil, South Sudan =

Aweil Madiŋ Awël
- City
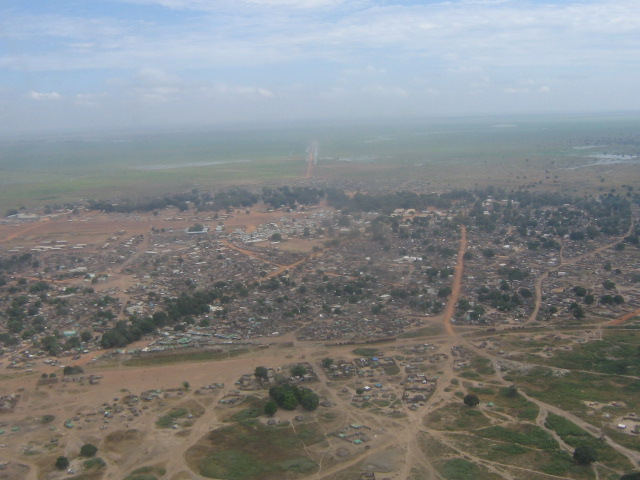
- Aerial photo of Aweil (2007).

- Location in South Sudan
- Coordinates: 08°46′02″N 27°23′59″E
- Country: South Sudan
- State: Northern Bahr el Ghazal
- County: Aweil Center County

Government
  - State Governor: Charles Madut Akol Deng
- Elevation: 425 m (1,394 ft)

Population (2010)
  - Total: 33,537
- Time zone: UTC+2 (CAT)
- Climate: Aw

Aweil is a city located in South Sudan. It is the capital of Northern Bahr el Ghazal state and the administrative centre of Aweil Center County. It is also a service centre for the surrounding villages. Refugees, war displaced returnees, nomadic cattle keepers and local families moving seasonally with their animals to source water give Aweil a mobile population.

== History ==
Aweil is an area which was affected by the slave trade in the 19th century and by civil war in the 20th century. It was the capital of Aweil State, a government area which existed between 2000 and 2020.

== Geography ==
The town lies in the northwest of South Sudan on the A43. It is approximately 100 km south of the international border with the Republic of Sudan. The disputed region of Abyei is to the East.

Juba, the capital of South Sudan, is approximately 637 km to the South. The nearest larger town is Wau. There are several villages near to Aweil, some on the A43 and others in the countryside. Ashana Game Reserve is approximately 30 km to the west.

The topography is flat and prone to flooding. However, at an elevation of 425 m (1,394 ft) Aweil is on higher ground than the surrounding plains. The city lies close to the confluence of the Lol River with the Pongo River. The average elevation of the city of Aweil is about 425 metres (1,394 ft) above sea level.

== Climate ==
Aweil is located in a Tropical savanna climate (classification Aw) with, usually, a dry winter. Summer can also be dry despite Aweil being in the tropics. The dry weather can develop to drought.

The district's mean annual high temperature is 30.39 °C (86.7 °F) . The mean annual low temperature is 23.2 °C (74.52 °F). Aweil's average annual precipitation is 95.08 mm (3.74 in). The average number of rain days per year is 125.39. Aweil had flooding rain in 2019. In 2020, drought weather in July was followed by high rainfall in August which interrupted crop production.

== Demographics ==
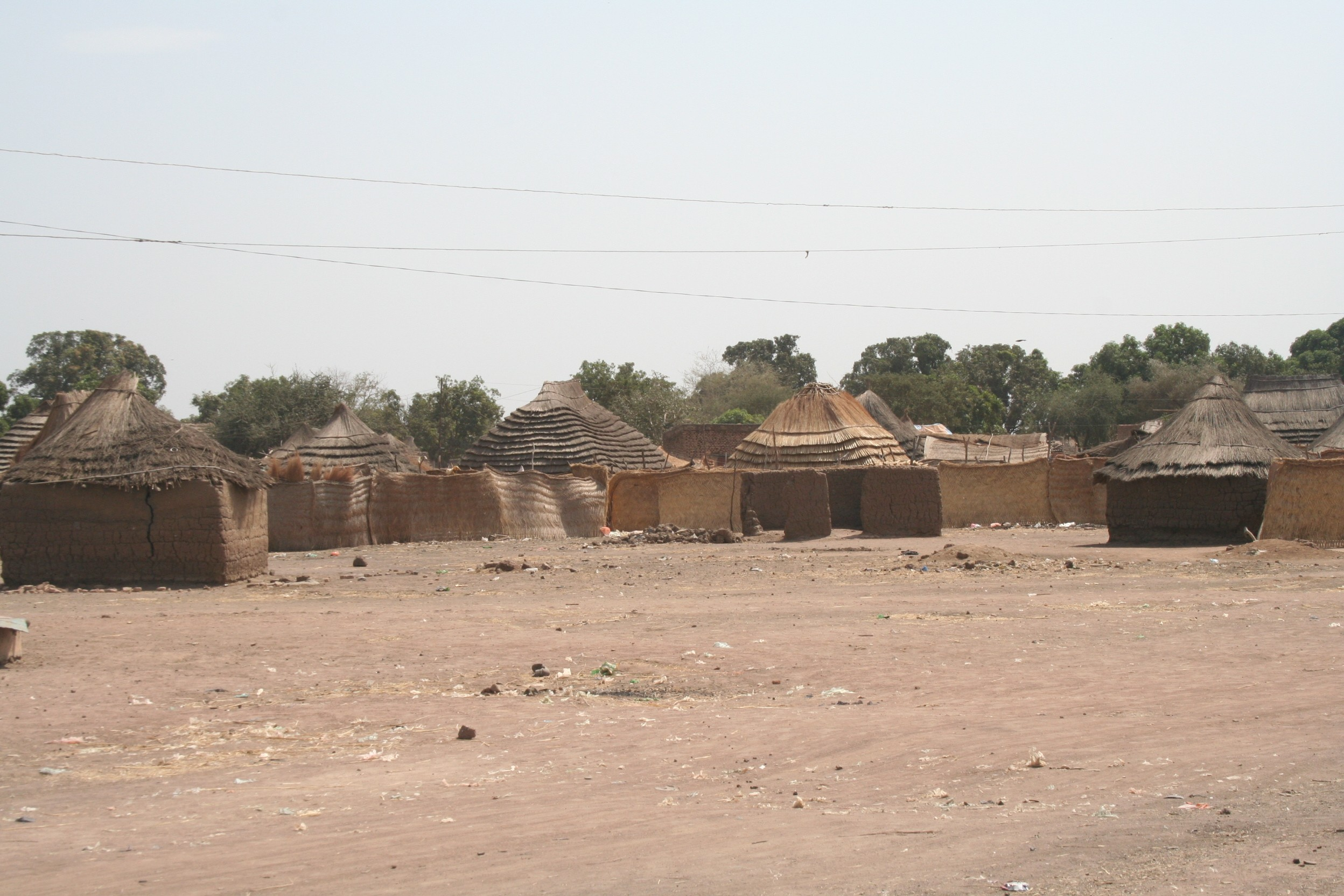
Thatched huts in Aweil, South Sudan

In November 2008, Médecins Sans Frontières estimated the town's population at about 100,000, but there is no verified population figure. In 2024, the population was estimated to be 38,745.

The two main ethnic groups are Dinka and Luwo. A majority of voters support the Sudan People's Liberation Movement. Arabic language is used in Aweil in some households and public places but not widely.

== Economy ==
Aweil is a service town to farming villages. Products from agriculture include cattle, sorghum, ground nuts and sesame. There are nearby rivers for fishing. Farming in a difficult environment has led to food insecurity.

Economic development projects near Aweil include a teak plantation, a rice plantation and a women's market.

== Infrastructure and services ==
=== Transport ===
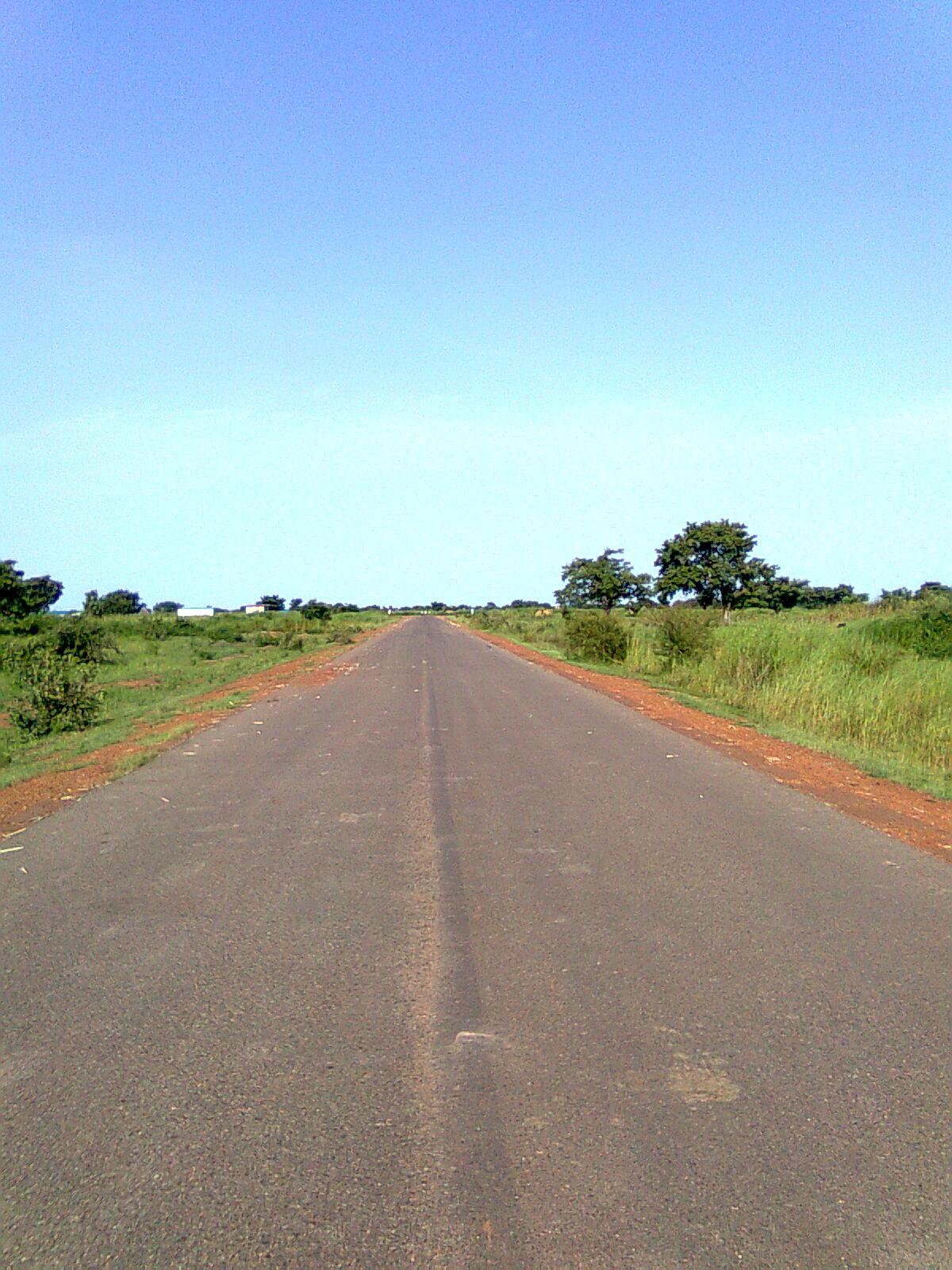
Aweil tar-mac road near Aweil (Aweil East border to Koum).

The Khartoum - Aweil - Wau, South Sudan railway line was constructed in 1961. After a period of disuse due to civil war damage, the line from Aweil to Wau and the station were restored to use in 2010.

Aweil airstrip is located 4.4 km (2.4 nm) northwest of Aweil's city center. There is a packed dirt runway of about 2000 m (6600 ft) in length. Its ICAO name is HSAW. Confirmation of the airport's condition is needed prior to any approach. Four accidents at the airstrip have occurred since 1973. Three of the four involved military aircraft. Two of these were attributed to attacks by surface to air missiles. In 2024, the airstrip is used by Badr Airlines transporting non-government organisation passengers and cargo to and from Aweil and Juba each Monday.

In the town, transport options include taxis, boda bodas (motorcycle taxis).

=== Education ===
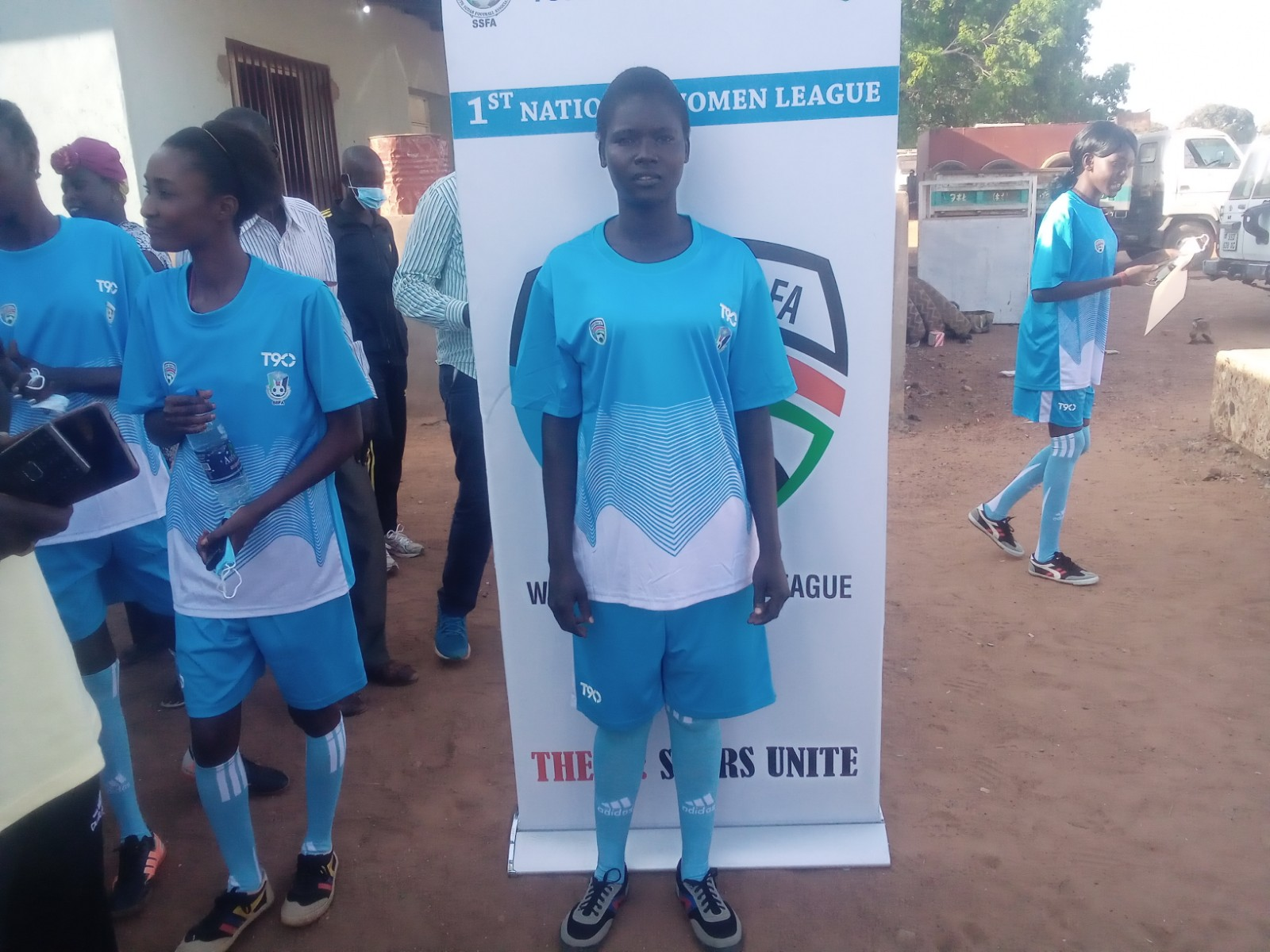
Aweil woman football coach, Awein Atak Makak

The St. Mary's Girls Secondary School is owned and administered by the Aweil Diocese of the Episcopal Church of the Sudan (ECS)

=== Health ===
Aweil Civil Hospital is a referral hospital, one of the three in South Sudan.

== Culture and religion ==
=== Peace and unity ===
In April 2023, Northern Bahr El Ghazal's State Ministry of Culture with support from the United Nations Mission in South Sudan (UNMISS) held a peace celebration in Aweil. The theme of the festival was "Unity in diversity" reflecting Aweil (and South Sudan's) ethnic diversity. In August 2024, national culture day was celebrated at the Dr. John Garang Mausoleum with the theme, "Our Culture, Our Coexistence". The Aweil News Agency covered the event in depth with video footage at the agency's Facebook page.

=== Religion ===
The Catholic Church is present in Aweil at St. George's church.

== Sports ==
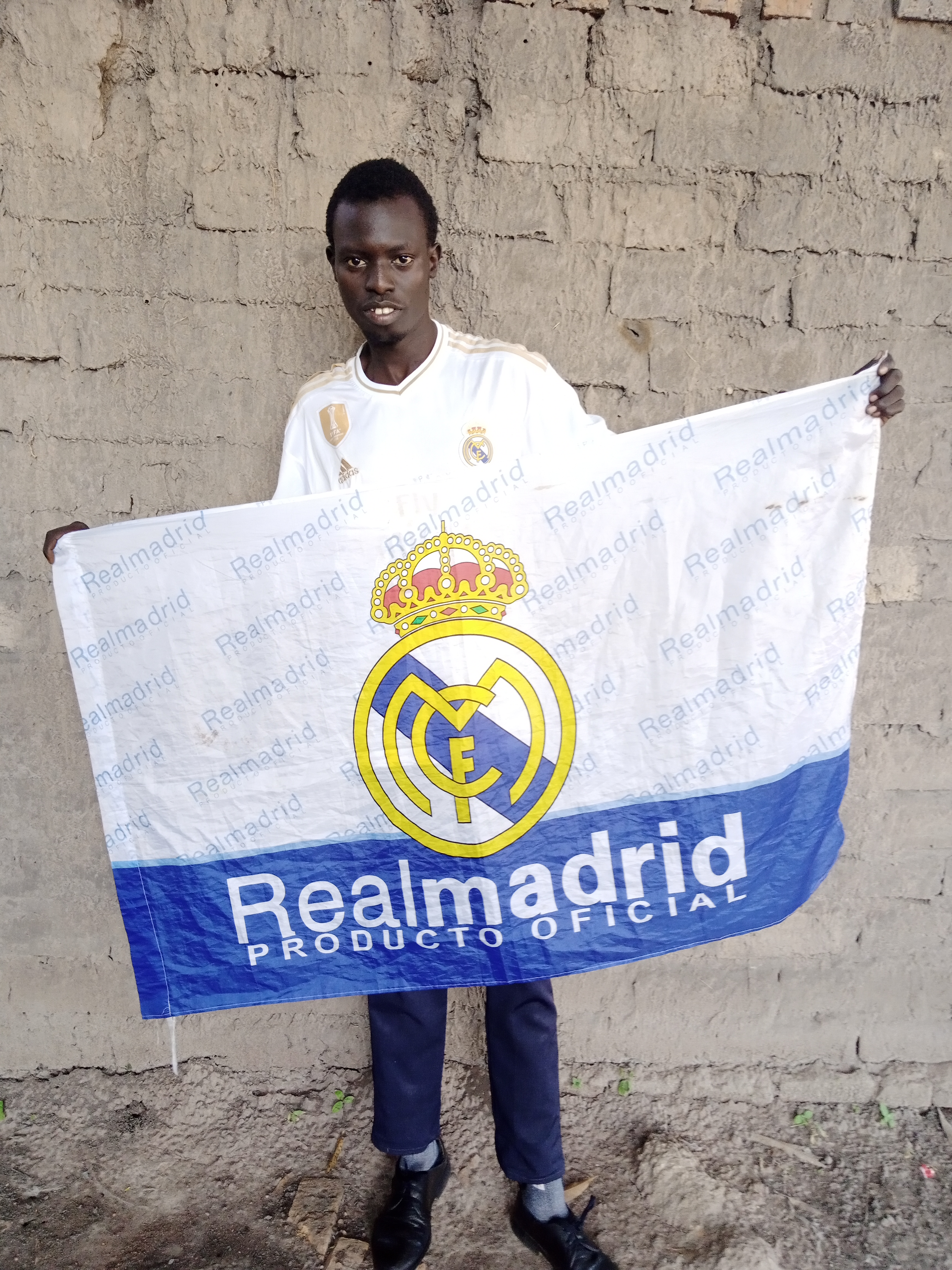
Madut Aluk's son Clement Ker, Real Madrid's Aweilian fan

Association football (soccer) is a popular sport in Aweil. The Aweil Stars FC and opponents play at the Aweil sportsground. Fans follow their favourite Spanish teams such as Real Madrid CF.

== Non-government organisations ==
Pan Aweil Development Agency (PADA) was founded in 2009 and recognised by the Southern Sudan Relief and Rehabilitation Commission in 2010. The founder is William Kolong Pioth, one of the Lost Boys of Sudan. The agency supports small scale local business ventures in key areas such as agriculture, water sanitation and community development. It also fosters peaceful conflict resolution in the nearby border regions.

The United Nations Mission in South Sudan (UNMISS) maintains a presence in Aweil.

During the war of independence of South Sudan which brings episodes of famine, on December 21, 1989, an Aviation Sans Frontières and Médecins Sans Frontières plane was shot down in Aweil. On board were three French nationals, Yvon Féliot, a pilot for Aviation Without Borders, Jean-Paul Bescond, a doctor, and Laurent Fernet, a logistician, both working for Doctors Without Borders (MSF) as well as Frazer Ariyamba, a technician for the World Food Programme (WFP).

== Notable people ==
- Valentino Achak Deng
- Madut Aluk
- Paul Malong Awan
- Benjamin Bol Mel
- James Alic Garang
