= Juba National Stadium =

Stadium in Juba, South Sudan

Coordinates: 4°50′35″N 31°36′57″E

- Interactive map of Juba National Stadium
- Full name: Juba National Stadium
- Location: Juba, South Sudan
- Capacity: 7,000
- Surface: AstroTurf

Construction
- Opened: 1962
- Renovated: 2022–2024

Tenants
- South Sudan national football team (2012–present); Atlabara FC; Al-Malakia FC; Al-Salam FC

Juba National Stadium is a multi-use stadium in Juba, South Sudan. It is the home ground of the South Sudan national football team and, as the only stadium in Juba for many years until recently, several local clubs as well, including Atlabara FC, Al-Malakia FC, and Al-Salam FC.

Juba Stadium opened in 1962. It hosted matches for the 2009 CECAFA U-17 Championship. Juba Stadium has been undergoing renovations and expansion, with completion due by end of 2022, and capacity to be increased to 19,000.

In May 2013, the Central Equatoria government announced plans to build a second stadium in Juba, with a capacity of 35,000. In 2021 the South Sudanese Government approved US $25m towards its construction, while the Chinese Government contributed 85% of the cost.

In 2022, the stadium underwent a massive, multi-year $5 million USD reconstruction project largely by the FIFA Forward program. FIFA President Gianni Infantino and President Salva Kiir join South Sudan Football Association President Augustino Parek helped inaugurate the stadium on June 11, 2024. The celebration was marked by the historic "Sudan Derby"—a 2026 FIFA World Cup Qualifier against neighboring Sudan, which represented South Sudan's first officially recognized home match on its own soil since gaining FIFA membership in 2012. South Sudan lost the match 3 to nil.

On October 2026, the SSFA closed the stadium for two weeks for maintenance work on its artificial turf.
