= Al-Malakia FC =

- Full name: Malakia Sport, Social and Cultural Club
- Nickname: The Royals
- Founded: 1946; 80 years ago
- Ground: Juba Stadium, South Sudan
- Capacity: 7,000
- Chairman: Jumaa Mohammed Jaber
- League: South Sudan Premier League
- 2025–26: 3rd
Home colours	Away colours

Malakia SSCC is a South Sudanese football club located in Juba, South Sudan which as of 2015 played in the South Sudan National league, at the 7,000 capacity Juba Stadium. In 2013 the club won the South Sudan National Cup.

== Honours ==
- South Sudan Football Championship

Winners (1 time): 2014

- South Sudan National Cup

Winners (2 time): 2013; 2014

== CAF Confederations Cup ==
=== Overall ===
Competition	Pld	W	D	L	GF	GA	GD
CAF Confederation Cup	2	0	0	2	1	5	−4

=== Matches ===
Season	Competition	Round	Club	Home	Away	Aggregate	Win/Loss
2014	2014 CAF Confederation Cup	P	(Republic of the Congo) CARA Brazzaville	0–1	1–4	5–1	Loss

Notes:

P: Preliminary Round

== CAF Champions League ==
=== Overall ===
Competition	Pld	W	D	L	GF	GA	GD
CAF Champions League	2	0	0	2	0	5	−5

=== Matches ===
Season	Competition	Round	Club	Home	Away	Aggregate	Win/Loss
2015	2015 CAF Champions League	P	(Nigeria) Kano Pillars	0–2	0–3	0–5	Loss

Notes:

P: Preliminary Round
