= South Sudan National League =

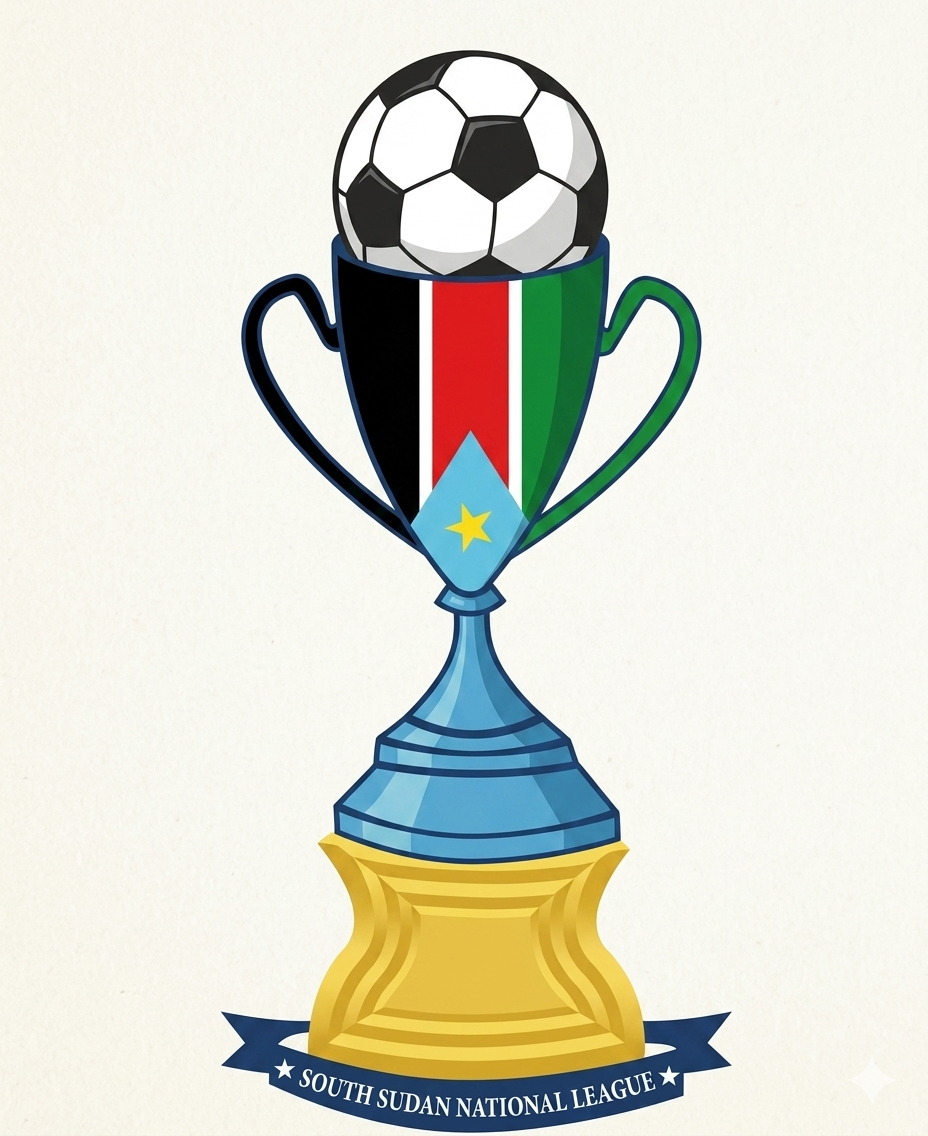
- Organising body: South Sudan Football Association
- Founded: 2011; 15 years ago
- Country: South Sudan
- Confederation: CAF
- Number of clubs: 14 Teams
- Level on pyramid: 2
- Promotion to: South Sudan Premier League
- Relegation to: Regional Local Association Leagues
- Domestic cup: South Sudan National Cup
- Current champions: Super Star FC Bor
- Most championships: Atlabara (3)
- Current: 2025/26 Season

The South Sudan National League (SSNL) is the second-tier football league in South Sudan, organized by South Sudan Football Association (SSFA). The league was established in 2011, It serves as the primary promotion pathway to the top division known as South Sudan Premier League (SSPL).

== History ==
The competition now commonly called the South Sudan National League or South Sudan Football Championship began after South Sudan Independence in 2011 and involved champions from different state associations. At the time, it was effectively the country's top national competition because nationwide South Sudan Premier League did not yet exist

The new national professional top division, the South Sudan Premier League (SSPL), was officially launched in late 2024, which moved the National League down to the second tier.

=== Historical Timeline ===
Year	Event
2011	South Sudan Becomes Independent
2011-12	First Football Championship league held
2011-2024	National League Functions as the top national competition
2024	South Sudan Premier League established
2025-present	National League becomes the Second-tier League

== Previous winners ==
Years	Champions
2012	Al-Salam (1)
2013	Atlabara (1)
2014	Al-Malakia (1)
2015	Atlabara (2)
2016	(Not held)
2017	Al-Salam (2)
2018	Al-Hilal (1)
2019	Atlabara (3)
2020	Championship not finished due to Covid-19
2021	(Not held)
2022	(Not held)
2023	Bor Salaam (1)
2024/25	(Not held) League was replaced by South Sudan Premier League
2025/26	Super Stare FC Bor (1)

== Performance by club ==
Club	Winners	Winning years
Atlabara	3	2013, 2015, 2019
Al-Salaam	2	2011–12, 2017
Al-Malakia	1	2014
Al-Hilal Wau	1	2018
Salaam (Bor)	1	2023
Super Stare FC Bor	1	2024/25
