= 2021–22 Tanzanian Premier League =

Tanzanian Premier League
- Season: 2021–22
- Dates: 27 September 2021 – 29 June 2022
- Champions: Young Africans S.C.
- Promoted: Ihefu F.C. Singida Big Stars
- Relegated: Mbeya Kwanza; Biashara United
- Champions League: Young Africans S.C. Simba S.C.
- Confederation Cup: Azam F.C.
- Matches: 240
- Goals: 471 (1.96 per match)
- Top goalscorer: (Tanzania) George Mpole (17 goals)
- Longest unbeaten run: 30 (Young Africans S.C.)
- All statistics correct as of 9 August 2022.

The 2021–22 Tanzanian Premier League (known as the NBC Premier League for sponsorship reasons) was the 57th season of the Tanzanian Premier League, the top-tier football league in Tanzania (mainland only), since its establishment in 1965. The season started on 27 September 2021. The season ended with Young Africans S.C. clinching their 28th premier league title, winning the entire season undefeated.

== League table ==
Pos	Team	Pld	W	D	L	GF	GA	GD	Pts	Qualification or relegation
1	Young Africans (C)	30	22	8	0	49	8	+41	74	Qualification for Champions League
2	Simba	30	17	10	3	41	14	+27	61	Qualification for Champions League
3	Azam	30	14	7	9	41	28	+13	49	Qualification for Confederation Cup
4	Geita Gold	30	12	10	8	32	26	+6	46	
5	Namungo	30	10	11	9	42	34	+8	41	
6	Kagera Sugar	30	9	12	9	20	25	−5	39	
7	Coastal Union	30	10	8	12	22	31	−9	38	
8	Polisi Morogoro	30	8	13	9	21	23	−2	37	
9	Mbeya City	30	8	13	9	25	29	−4	37	
10	KMC	30	8	11	11	34	35	−1	35	
11	Dodoma Jiji FC	30	9	8	13	25	37	−12	35	
12	Ruvu Shooting	30	8	10	12	28	39	−11	34	
13	Mtibwa Sugar (O)	30	7	10	13	25	34	−9	31	Qualification to Relegation play-offs
14	Prisons	30	7	8	15	21	34	−13	29	Qualification to Relegation play-offs
15	Biashara United (R)	30	5	13	12	23	35	−12	28	Relegation
16	Mbeya Kwanza (R)	30	5	10	15	22	39	−17	25	Relegation

Updated to match(es) played on 22 June 2022. Source: XScores
Rules for classification: 1) Points; 2) Goal difference; 3) Goals scored; 4) Head-to-head points; 5) Head-to-head goal difference; 6) Head-to-head goals scored; 7) Play-off
(C) Champions; (O) Play-off winners; (R) Relegated

=== Prize Money ===
All Teams that participate get a prize money depending on their position in the league.

Position	Prize money (TZS)
1st	600m/-
2nd	300m/-
3rd	225m/-
4th	200m/-
Relegated Teams	10m/-

== Relegation play-offs ==
=== Semi-finals ===
==== First leg ====
3 July 2022	Prisons	1–3	Mtibwa Sugar
16:00	M. Mhilu 60'	Report	J. Kibaya 22'; J. Kibaya 54'; S. Kanoni 71'

6 July 2022	Mtibwa Sugar	0-1	Prisons
16:00		Report	M. Said 53'

==== Second leg ====
9 July 2022	JKT Tanzania	0-1	Prisons
16:00		Report	O. Paulo 38'

13 July 2022	Prisons	1-1	JKT Tanzania
16:00	B. Asukile 65'	Report	E. Songo 36' (Pen)

== Statistics ==
=== Top goalscorers ===
Rank	Player	Team	Goals
1	(Democratic Republic of the Congo) Fiston Mayele	Yanga	17
1	(Tanzania) George Mpole	Geita Gold	17
3	(Tanzania) Reliants Lusajo	Namungo	10
4	(Tanzania) Matheo Anthony	KMC	9
4	(Zambia) Rodgers Kola	Azam	9
6	(Tanzania) Kibu Denis	Simba	8
7	(Tanzania) Anuary Jabir	Dodoma Jiji	7
7	(Tanzania) Jeremiah Juma	Tanzania Prisons	7
7	(Rwanda) Meddie Kagere	Simba	7
7	(Burundi) Saidi Ntibazonkiza	Yanga	7
7	(Tanzania) Abdul Suleiman	Coastal Union	7

=== Multiple hat-tricks ===
Player	For	Against	Score	Date
(Tanzania) Jeremiah Juma	Tanzania Prisons	Namungo	3-1	20 November 2021
(Tanzania) Shiza Kichuya	Namungo	Ntibwa Sugar	2-4	26 June 2022
(Democratic Republic of the Congo) Idris Mbombo	Azam	Biashara United	4-1	29 June 2022
