= 2015–16 Tanzanian Premier League =

Tanzanian Premier League
- Season: 2015–16
- Champions: Young Africans
- Matches: 240
- Goals: 484 (2.02 per match)
- Top goalscorer: (Burundi) Amissi Tambwe (21 goals)

The 2015–16 Tanzanian Premier League is the 51st season of top-tier football in Tanzania. The Young Africans are the defending champions after winning their 20th title last season.

== Participating teams ==
Sixteen teams competed in the 2015–16 season.

=== Stadia and locations ===
Locations of the 2015–16 Tanzanian Premier League teams.

Team	Stadium	Capacity
African Sports	Mkwakwani Stadium	10,000
Azam	Chamazi Stadium	7,000
Coastal Union	Mkwakwani Stadium	10,000
JKT Mgambo	Mkwakwani Stadium	10,000
JKT Ruvu Stars	Uhuru Stadium	20,000
Kagera Sugar	Kaitaba Stadium	5,000
Maji Maji	Maji Maji Stadium	30,000
Mbeya City	Sokoine Stadium	10,000
Mtibwa Sugar	Jamhuri Stadium	10,000
Mwadui	Kambarage Stadium	10,000
Ndanda	Nangwanda Sijaona Stadium	15,000
Simba	National Stadium	60,000
Stand United	Kambarage Stadium	10,000
Prisons	Sokoine Stadium	10,000
Toto African	CCM Kirumba Stadium	35,000
Young Africans	National Stadium	60,000

== League table ==
Pos	Team	Pld	W	D	L	GF	GA	GD	Pts	Qualification or relegation
1	Young Africans	30	22	7	1	70	20	+50	73	Qualification for 2017 CAF Champions League
2	Azam	30	18	10	2	47	24	+23	64	Qualification for 2017 CAF Confederation Cup
3	Simba	30	19	5	6	45	17	+28	62	
4	Prisons	30	13	12	5	29	22	+7	51	
5	Mtibwa Sugar	30	14	8	8	33	21	+12	50	
6	Mwadui	30	11	8	11	29	29	0	41	
7	Stand United	30	12	4	14	28	30	−2	40	
8	Mbeya City	30	9	8	13	20	26	−6	35	
9	Ndanda	30	7	14	9	28	31	−3	35	
10	Maji Maji	30	9	8	13	22	40	−18	35	
11	JKT Ruvu Stars	30	8	8	14	31	43	−12	32	
12	Kagera Sugar	30	8	7	15	23	34	−11	31	
13	Toto African	30	7	9	14	26	40	−14	30	Relegation to Tanzanian First Division League
14	JKT Mgambo	30	6	10	14	24	30	−6	28	Relegation to Tanzanian First Division League
15	African Sports	30	7	5	18	13	34	−21	26	Relegation to Tanzanian First Division League
16	Coastal Union	30	5	7	18	16	41	−25	22	Relegation to Tanzanian First Division League

Updated to match(es) played on 21 May 2016. Source: Standings
Rules for classification: 1) points; 2) goal difference; 3) number of goals scored.
