= 2024–25 Tanzanian Premier League =

Tanzanian Premier League
- Season: 2024–25
- Dates: 16 August 2024 – 25 June 2025
- Champions: Young Africans
- Relegated: Kagera Sugar; KenGold
- Champions League: Young Africans; Simba
- Confederation Cup: Azam; Singida Black Stars
- Matches: 240
- Goals: 569 (2.37 per match)
- Top goalscorer: Jean Ahoua (16 goals)
- Biggest home win: Young Africans 5–0 Fountain Gate (29 December 2024); Young Africans 6–1 KenGold (5 February 2025); Simba 6–0 Dodoma Jiji (14 March 2025)
- Biggest away win: Kagera Sugar 2–5 Simba (21 December 2024); Kinondoni MC 1–6 Young Africans (14 February 2025); Mashujaa 0–5 Young Africans (23 February 2025); Kagera Sugar 2–4 Azam (19 April 2025)
- Highest scoring: Kagera Sugar 2–5 Simba (21 December 2024); Young Africans 6–1 KenGold (5 February 2025); Kinondoni MC 1–6 Young Africans (14 February 2025); Simba 6–0 Dodoma Jiji (14 March 2025); Kagera Sugar 2–4 Azam (19 April 2025)
- Longest winning run: 8 matches Simba
- Longest unbeaten run: 17 matches Simba
- All statistics correct as of Complete.

The 2024–25 Tanzanian Premier League (known as the NBC Premier League for sponsorship reasons) was the 60th season of the Tanzanian Premier League, the top-tier football league in Tanzania (mainland only), since its establishment in 1965. The season started on 16 August 2024 and ended on 25 June 2025. The Young Africans drew the highest average home league attendance with 10,176.

== Teams ==
The league consisted of 16 teams; the top 14 teams from the previous season, and two teams promoted from the Tanzanian Championship League. Young Africans entered the season as defending champions (for the third consecutive season).

The promoted teams were the 2023–24 Tanzanian Championship League champions KenGold and runners-up Pamba Jiji. They replaced the 2023–24 Tanzanian Premier League bottom two teams Geita Gold and Mtibwa Sugar.

=== Name changes ===
- Before the start of the season, Ihefu FC renamed their club as the Singida Black Stars as part of a rebrand.

=== Locations ===
Location of clubs in Tanzania for the 2024–25 Tanzanian Premier League season

== League table ==
Pos	Team	Pld	W	D	L	GF	GA	GD	Pts	Qualification or relegation
1	Young Africans (C)	30	27	1	2	83	10	+73	82	Qualification for the Champions League
2	Simba	30	25	3	2	69	13	+56	78	Qualification for the Champions League
3	Azam	30	19	6	5	56	19	+37	63	Qualification for the Confederation Cup (Note: The 2024–25 Tanzania FA Cup winners also qualified for the Confederation Cup. Since the cup winners (Young Africans) qualified based on league position, the Confederation Cup spot was passed to the fourth-placed team.)
4	Singida Black Stars	30	17	6	7	45	26	+19	57	Qualification for the Confederation Cup
5	Tabora United	30	10	8	12	28	45	−17	38	
6	JKT Tanzania	30	8	12	10	27	27	0	36	
7	Mashujaa	30	8	11	11	29	33	−4	35	
8	Coastal Union	30	8	11	11	26	31	−5	35	
9	Namungo	30	9	8	13	28	36	−8	35	
10	Kinondoni FC	30	9	8	13	26	43	−17	35	
11	Pamba Jiji	30	8	10	12	22	33	−11	34	
12	Dodoma Jiji	30	9	7	14	31	49	−18	34	
13	Prisons (O)	30	8	7	15	26	46	−20	31	Qualification for the Tanzanian Premier League play-off
14	Fountain Gate (O)	30	8	5	17	32	58	−26	29	Qualification for the Tanzanian Premier League play-off
15	Kagera Sugar (R)	30	5	8	17	22	41	−19	23	Relegation to the Tanzanian Championship League
16	KenGold (R)	30	3	7	20	22	62	−40	16	Relegation to the Tanzanian Championship League

Source: Tanzania Premier League Board Flashscore, Soccerway
Rules for classification: 1) Points; 2) Goal difference; 3) Goals scored; 4) Head-to-head points; 5) Head-to-head goal difference; 6) Head-to-head goals scored; 7) Play-off
(C) Champions; (O) Play-off winners; (R) Relegated

== Results ==
Each team plays each other twice (30 matches each), once at home and once away.

Home \ Away	AZA	COA	DOM	FOU	JKT	KAG	KEN	KMC	MAS	NAM	PAM	PRI	SIM	SBS	TAB	YGA
Azam	—	1–0	5–0	2–0	3–1	1–0	4–1	2–0	2–0	1–1	0–0	4–0	0–2	2–1	5–0	1–2
Coastal Union	0–0	—	2–0	1–0	2–1	1–0	2–1	1–1	0–1	0–2	2–0	2–1	0–3	2–1	1–1	0–1
Dodoma Jiji	1–3	0–0	—	1–0	1–0	2–0	3–0	2–1	3–1	1–0	0–1	3–2	0–1	1–2	2–0	0–4
Fountain Gate	2–3	3–2	2–2	—	0–1	3–1	2–1	3–1	2–2	1–2	1–3	1–0	1–1	0–3	0–0	0–4
JKT Tanzania	0–0	2–1	2–2	3–1	—	2–0	1–1	0–0	0–0	2–2	0–0	1–0	0–1	0–1	4–2	0–0
Kagera Sugar	2–4	2–1	2–1	3–0	0–0	—	2–0	0–0	0–1	1–1	2–1	0–0	2–5	0–1	1–2	0–2
KenGold	0–2	1–1	2–2	2–0	1–0	1–0	—	1–1	2–2	2–3	0–2	1–3	0–5	1–3	1–1	0–1
Kinondoni MC	0–4	1–1	2–1	1–2	0–2	1–0	1–0	—	0–0	1–0	1–0	3–2	1–2	2–0	0–2	1–6
Mashujaa	0–0	0–0	1–0	2–0	0–0	1–1	3–0	1–1	—	1–0	2–0	0–0	0–1	0–1	3–0	0–5
Namungo	0–1	0–0	2–2	0–2	0–0	0–0	5–0	2–1	2–1	—	1–0	1–0	0–3	0–1	1–2	0–2
Pamba Jiji	1–0	2–0	0–0	1–1	1–0	1–1	1–0	1–1	2–2	1–1	—	0–0	0–1	0–1	1–0	0–3
Prisons	0–2	2–1	0–0	3–2	3–2	1–0	1–0	1–2	2–1	0–1	1–0	—	0–1	0–2	1–1	0–5
Simba	2–2	2–2	6–0	4–0	1–0	1–0	2–0	4–0	2–1	3–0	5–1	3–0	—	1–0	3–0	0–1
Singida Black Stars	1–0	0–0	2–1	2–0	1–1	2–2	2–1	2–1	3–0	2–0	2–2	3–3	0–1	—	3–0	0–1
Tabora United	2–1	1–1	1–0	1–3	1–2	1–0	1–1	0–1	1–0	2–1	1–0	0–0	0–3	2–2	—	0–3
Young Africans	0–1	1–0	5–0	5–0	2–0	4–0	6–1	1–0	3–2	3–0	4–0	4–0	2–0	2–1	1–3	—

Source: Flashscore, Soccerway
Legend: Blue = home team win; Yellow = draw; Red = away team win.

=== Results by round ===
Team ╲ Round	1	2	3	4	5
Azam	D	D	W		
Coastal Union	D	L	L		
Dodoma Jiji	L	D	W	D	
Fountain Gate	L	W	W	D	
JKT Tanzania	D	D			
Kagera Sugar	L	L	L	D	
KenGold	L	L	L		
Kinondoni MC	D	L	W	L	
Mashujaa	W	D	W		
Namungo	L	L	L	W	
Pamba Jiji	D	D	D	L	
Prisons	D	D	D		
Simba	W	W			
Singida Black Stars	W	W	W	W	
Tabora United	L	W	W	D	
Young Africans	W				

Updated to match(es) played on 28 May 2025. Source:
W = Win; D = Draw; L = Loss

=== Positions by round ===
To preserve chronological evolvements, (1) any postponed matches, and (2) matches that are originally scheduled and played after a full round has started, are not included to the round at which they were originally scheduled, but added to the full round they were played immediately afterwards. For example, if a match is scheduled for round 7, but then played between rounds 8 and 9, it will be added to the standings for round 8. From the schedule released by the league, there are earlier rounds that will overlap.

Team ╲ Round	1	2	3	4	5
Singida Black Stars	2	2	1	1	
Mashujaa	3	3	2	2	
Fountain Gate	12	16	4	3	
Tabora United	16	4	5	4	
Simba	1	1	3	5	
Azam	6	8	9	6	
Dodoma Jiji	14	7	6	7	
Kinondoni MC	10	11	12	8	
Young Africans	13	12	7	9	
Prisons	5	6	10	10	
Pamba Jiji	4	5	8	11	
Namungo	11	13	15	12	
JKT Tanzania	8	10	11	13	
Coastal Union	7	9	13	14	
Kagera Sugar	9	14	16	15	
KenGold	15	15	14	16	

Qualification for the Champions League
Qualification for the Confederation Cup
Qualification for the Tanzanian Premier League play-off
Relegation to the Tanzanian Championship League

Updated to match(es) played on 28 May 2025. Source:

== Tanzanian Premier League play-off ==
The 13th and 14th-placed teams (Prisons and Fountain Gate) qualified for the Tanzanian Premier League play-off, alongside the 3rd and 4th-placed teams from the 2024–25 Tanzanian Championship League (Stand United and Geita Gold).

Held over two legs, the Championship teams qualified for the quarter-finals, followed by the Premier League teams facing each other in the semi-finals and the winners remaining in the league; the quarter-final winners then faced the semi-final losers for the final place in the 2025–26 Tanzanian Premier League.

=== Quarter-finals ===
==== First leg ====
24 May 2025	Geita Gold	2–2	Stand United	Geita
				Stadium: Nyankumbu Stadium

==== Second leg ====
29 May 2025	Stand United	2–0 (4–2 agg.)	Geita Gold	Shinyanga
				Stadium: Kambarage Stadium

=== Semi-finals ===
==== First leg ====
26 June 2025	Fountain Gate	1–1	Prisons	Babati
				Stadium: Kwaraa Stadium

==== Second leg ====
30 June 2025	Prisons	3–1 (4–2 agg.)	Fountain Gate	Mbeya
16:00				Stadium: Sokoine Stadium

=== Finals ===
==== First leg ====
4 July 2025	Stand United	1–3	Fountain Gate	Shinyanga
16:00				Stadium: Kambarage Stadium

==== Second leg ====
8 July 2025	Fountain Gate	2–0 (5–1 agg.)	Stand United	Babati
16:00		Report		Stadium: Kwaraa Stadium

== Season statistics ==
=== Scoring ===
==== Top scorers ====
As of As of 25 June 2025

Rank	Player	Club	Goals
1	(Ivory Coast) Jean Ahoua	Simba	16
2	(Tanzania) Clement Mzize	Young Africans	14
3	(Zimbabwe) Prince Dube	Young Africans	13
4	(Cameroon) Leonel Ateba	Simba	13
5	(Uganda) Steven Mukwala	Simba	13
6	(Ghana) Jonathan Sowah	Singida Black Stars	12
7	(Ivory Coast) Pacôme Zouzoua	Young Africans	12
8	(The Gambia) Gibril Sillah	Azam	11
9	(Kenya) Elvis Rupia	Singida Black Stars	10
10	(Burkina Faso) Stephane Aziz Ki	Young Africans	9

==== Most assists ====
As of As of 25 June 2025

Rank	Player	Club	Assists
1	(Tanzania) Feisal salum	Azam F.C	13
3	(Democratic Republic of the Congo) Maxi Nzengeli	Young Africans	10
2	(Ivory Coast) Pacome Zouzoua	Young Africans	10
5	(Ivory Coast) Jean Ahoua	Simba	9
4	(Zimbabwe) Prince Dube	Young Africans	8

==== Own goals ====
As of As of 30 April 2025

Rank	Player	Club	Own goals
1	(Tanzania) Daniel Mgore	Dodoma Jiji	1
2	(Tanzania) Ladack Chasambi	Simba	1
3	(Tanzania) Kevin Kijili	simba	1

=== Hat-tricks ===
As of As of 8 May 2025

	Player	For	Against	Result	Date
1	(Zimbabwe) Prince Dube	Young Africans	mashujaa	3-2(H)	19 December 2024
2	(Burkina Faso) Stephan Aziz ki	Young Africans	KMC	1-6(A)	14 February 2025
3	(Uganda) Steven Mukwala	Simba	Coastal Union	0-3(A)	1 March 2025
4	(Ivory Coast) Jean Ahoua	Simba	Pamba Jiji	5-1(H)	8 May 2025

Note

(H) – Home; (A) – Away

=== Clean sheets ===
As of As of 23 June 2025

Rank	Player	Club	Clean sheets
1	(Guinea) Moussa Camara	Simba	19
2	(Mali) Djigui Diarra	Young Africans	17
3	(Tanzania) Patrick Munthali	Mashujaa	12
4	(Tanzania) Yona Amosi	Pamba Jiji	11
5	(Sudan) Mohammed Mustafa	Azam F.C	10
6	(Tanzania) Yakoubu Suleiman Ali	JKT Tanzania	8
7	(Tanzania) Metacha Mnata	Singida Black Stars	7

=== Discipline ===
==== Red cards ====
As of 15 August 2024

Rank	Player	Team	Red cards
1	Ibrahim Hamad	Young Africans	1

=== Monthly awards ===
Month	Coach of the Month		Player of the Month	
Month	Coach	Club	Player	Club
August	Fadlu Davis	Simba	Jean Ahoua	Simba
September	Mohamed Muya	Fountain Gate	Seleman Mwalimu	Fountain Gate
October	Rashid Taoussi	Azam	Marouf Tchakei	Singida Black Stars
November	Rashid Taoussi	Azam	Offen Chikola	Tabora
December	Sead Ramovic	Young Africans	Clement Mzize	Young Africans
February	Miloud Hamdi	Young Africans	Prince Dube	Young Africans
March	Fadlu Davis	Simba	Steven Mukwala	Simba
April	Miloud Hamdi	Young Africans S.C.	Iddi Kipagwile	Dodoma Jiji FC
May	Fadlu Davids	Simba	Steven Mukwala	Simba
June	Miloud Hamdi	Young Africans	Pacome Zouzoua	Young Africans

== Attendances ==
The best-attended game in the league was the derby between Simba SC and the Young Africans at the Benjamin Mkapa Stadium with a capacity crowd of 60,000.

No.	Club	Average attendance
1	Young Africans	10,176
2	Simba SC	8,342
3	Azam FC	3,412
4	Singida Black Stars	2,781
5	Tabora United	2,236
6	JKT Tanzania	2,144
7	Mashujaa	2,057
8	Coastal Union	1,623
9	Namungo FC	1,189
10	Kinondoni FC	1,083
11	Pamba Jiji	1,029
12	Dodoma Jiji	987
13	Tanzania Prisons	953
14	Fountain Gate	912
15	Kagera Sugar	828
16	KenGold	407
