= 2022–23 Tanzanian Premier League =

Tanzanian Premier League
- Season: 2022–23
- Dates: 15 August 2022 – 24 June 2023
- Champions: Young Africans
- Relegated: Mbeya City (via Tanzanian Premier League play-off); Polisi Morogoro; Ruvu Shooting
- Champions League: Young Africans; Simba
- Confederation Cup: Azam; Singida Big Stars
- Matches: 240
- Top goalscorer: (Democratic Republic of the Congo) Fiston Kalala Mayele (Burundi) Saidi Ntibazonkiza (17 goals)
- All statistics correct as of 10 June 2022.

The 2022–23 Tanzanian Premier League (known as the NBC Premier League for sponsorship reasons) was the 58th season of the Tanzanian Premier League, the top-tier football league in Tanzania (mainland only), since its establishment in 1965. The season started on 27 September 2021. The season ended with Young Africans S.C. clinching their 29th premier league title, losing only two games in the entire season. This was the team's second consecutive championship win. Congolese striker Fiston Kalala Mayele (Yanga S.C.) along with Burundian striker Saidi Ntibazonkiza (Simba S.C.) were the top scorers of the season.

== League table ==
Pos	Team	Pld	W	D	L	GF	GA	GD	Pts	Qualification or relegation
1	Young Africans (C)	30	25	3	2	61	18	+43	78	Qualification for the Champions League
2	Simba	30	22	7	1	75	17	+58	73	Qualification for the Champions League
3	Azam	30	18	5	7	55	29	+26	59	Qualification for the Confederation Cup (Note: The 2022–23 Tanzania FA Cup winners also qualified for the Confederation Cup. Since the cup winners (Young Africans) qualified based on league position, the Confederation Cup spot was passed to the fourth-placed team.)
4	Singida Big Stars	30	16	7	7	35	26	+9	55	Qualification for the Confederation Cup
5	Namungo	30	11	7	12	29	33	−4	40	
6	Ihefu	30	12	3	15	31	32	−1	39	
7	Geita Gold	30	9	10	11	35	44	−9	37	
8	Prisons	30	10	7	13	29	38	−9	37	
9	Dodoma Jiji	30	11	4	15	26	37	−11	37	
10	Mtibwa Sugar	30	9	8	13	34	45	−11	35	
11	Kagera Sugar	30	9	8	13	23	36	−13	35	
12	Coastal Union	30	8	9	13	25	35	−10	33	
13	Kinondoni MC (O)	30	8	8	14	25	31	−6	32	Qualification for the Tanzanian Premier League play-off
14	Mbeya City (R)	30	7	10	13	34	44	−10	31	Qualification for the Tanzanian Premier League play-off
15	Polisi Morogoro (R)	30	6	7	17	25	54	−29	25	Relegation to the Tanzanian Championship League
16	Ruvu Shooting (R)	30	5	5	20	19	42	−23	20	Relegation to the Tanzanian Championship League

Source: Flashscore
Rules for classification: 1) Points; 2) Goal difference; 3) Goals scored; 4) Head-to-head points; 5) Head-to-head goal difference; 6) Head-to-head goals scored; 7) Play-off
(C) Champions; (O) Play-off winners; (R) Relegated

== Results ==
Each team plays each other twice (30 matches each), once at home and once away.

Home \ Away	AZA	COA	DOM	GGF	IHF	KAG	KMC	MBE	MTI	NAM	POL	PRI	RUV	SIM	SIN	YGA
Azam	—	3–2	2–1	1–1	1–0	2–1	1–0	6–1	2–1	1–2	8–0	3–0	1–0	1–0	1–0	2–3
Coastal Union	0–2	—	0–1	0–0	1–0	2–0	1–0	1–0	1–0	1–1	0–0	1–0	0–0	0–3	1–1	0–2
Dodoma Jiji	2–1	1–1	—	1–0	1–2	2–0	1–0	1–3	0–1	0–1	2–1	1–2	2–1	0–1	0–1	0–2
Geita Gold	1–1	1–0	2–0	—	1–0	1–1	1–1	0–1	2–2	2–1	1–1	1–3	3–2	0–5	1–1	0–1
Ihefu	1–0	2–1	2–0	3–1	—	2–0	1–0	2–0	3–1	0–1	1–2	1–1	0–1	0–2	1–1	2–1
Kagera Sugar	2–2	0–0	0–0	2–2	2–0	—	1–0	1–0	1–0	1–0	2–0	0–1	2–1	1–1	1–2	0–1
Kinondoni MC	2–1	1–0	1–2	0–2	2–1	2–0	—	1–1	2–1	1–3	2–0	0–0	0–0	1–3	2–0	0–1
Mbeya City	0–1	2–2	1–2	0–0	1–1	2–2	0–1	—	1–0	2–1	3–1	1–2	1–2	1–1	1–1	3–3
Mtibwa Sugar	3–4	2–1	2–1	3–1	3–1	3–0	1–1	2–2	—	1–1	2–1	0–0	2–1	0–3	1–0	0–1
Namungo	0–1	1–0	0–1	2–1	2–0	2–1	0–0	2–1	2–2	—	0–2	2–3	1–0	1–1	1–1	0–2
Polisi Morogoro	0–1	3–3	1–1	1–2	2–1	0–0	2–2	0–1	3–1	1–0	—	1–0	0–0	1–3	0–1	1–2
Prisons	1–0	0–2	2–0	2–4	1–2	0–1	1–0	1–1	0–0	1–1	2–0	—	3–1	0–1	1–2	0–2
Ruvu Shooting	1–3	2–1	0–1	1–2	0–2	0–1	2–1	0–1	0–0	0–1	1–0	1–1	—	0–4	0–1	1–2
Simba	1–1	3–1	3–0	3–0	1–0	2–0	2–2	3–2	5–0	1–0	6–1	7–1	3–0	—	3–1	2–0
Singida Big Stars	1–0	1–2	0–0	2–1	1–0	1–0	1–0	2–1	2–0	3–0	3–0	1–0	2–1	1–1	—	0–2
Young Africans	2–2	3–0	4–2	3–1	1–0	5–0	1–0	2–0	3–0	2–0	3–0	1–0	1–0	1–1	4–1	—

Source: Flashscore
Legend: Blue = home team win; Yellow = draw; Red = away team win.

== Tanzanian Premier League play-off ==
The 13th and 14th-placed teams (Kinondoni MC and Mbeya City) qualified for the Tanzanian Premier League play-off, alongside the 3rd and 4th-placed teams from the 2022–23 Tanzanian Championship League (Pamba and Mashujaa). The Championship teams faced each other over two legs; the Premier League teams then also faced each other over two legs, with the winners remaining in the Tanzanian Premier League and the losers competing against the Championship play-off winners for the final place in the following season's Tanzanian Premier League.

=== Quarter-finals ===
==== First leg ====
21 May 2023	Mashujaa	4–0	Pamba	Kigoma
14:00				Stadium: Lake Tanganyika Stadium

==== Second leg ====
28 May 2023	Pamba	4–1 (4–5 agg.)	Mashujaa	Mwanza
14:00				Stadium: CCM Kirumba Stadium

=== Semi-finals ===
==== First leg ====
13 June 2023	Mbeya City	2–1	Kinondoni MC	Mbeya
16:00				Stadium: Sokoine Stadium

==== Second leg ====
16 June 2023	Kinondoni MC	2–0 (3–2 agg.)	Mbeya City	Kinondoni
16:00				Stadium: Uhuru Stadium

=== Final ===
==== First leg ====
19 June 2023	Mashujaa	3–1	Mbeya City	Kigoma
14:00				Stadium: Lake Tanganyika Stadium

==== Second leg ====
24 June 2023	Mbeya City	0–1 (1–4 agg.)	Mashujaa	Mbeya
14:00				Stadium: Sokoine Stadium

== Statistics ==
=== Top goalscorers ===
Rank	Player	Team	Goal
1	(Democratic Republic of the Congo) Fiston Mayele	Yanga	17
1	(Burundi) Saidi Ntibazonkiza	Simba	17
3	(Zimbabwe) Prince Dube	Azam	12
4	(Tanzania) John Bocco	Simba	10
4	(Brazil) Bruno Gomes	Singida	10
4	(Zambia) Moses Phiri	Simba	10
7	(Burkina Faso) Stephane Aziz Ki	Yanga	9
7	(Tanzania) Jeremiah Juma	Tanzania Prisons	9
7	(Ghana) Collins Opare	Dodoma Jiji	9
7	(Tanzania) Sixtus Sabilo	Mbeya City	9
7	(Senegal) Pape Sakho	Simba	9

=== Top clean sheets ===
Rank	Goalkeeper	Team	Clean sheets
1	(Mali) Djigui Diarra	Yanga	14
2	(Tanzania) Aishi Manula	Simba	12
3	(Comoros) Ali Ahamada	Azam	8
4	(Tanzania) Metacha Mnata	Yanga	7
5	(Tanzania) Selemani Bakari	Ihefu	6
5	(Tanzania) Said Kipao	Kagera Sugar	6
5	(Comoros) Mahamoud Mroivili	Coastal Union	6

=== Multiple hat-tricks ===
Player	For	Against	Score	Date
(Tanzania) John Bocco	Simba	Ruvu Shooting	0-4	12 November 2022
(Democratic Republic of the Congo) Fiston Mayele	Yanga	Singida	4-1	17 November 2022
(Tanzania) John Bocco	Simba	Tanzania Prisons	7-1	30 December 2022
(Burundi) Saidi Ntibazonkiza	Simba	Tanzania Prisons	7-1	30 December 2022
(Tanzania) Ibrahim Ali	Namungo	KMC	1-3	24 January 2023
(Democratic Republic of the Congo) Jean Baleke	Simba	Mtibwa	0-3	11 March 2023
(Burkina Faso) Stephane Aziz Ki	Yanga	Kagera Sugar	5-0	11 April 2023
(Burundi) Saidi Ntibazonkiza ^{5}	Simba	Polisi	6-1	6 June 2023
(Zimbabwe) Prince Dube^{4}	Azam	Polisi	8-0	9 June 2023

- ^{4}Player scored 4 goals
- ^{5}Player scored 5 goals
