= 2020–21 Tanzanian Premier League =

Tanzanian Premier League
- Season: 2020–21
- Dates: 6 August 2020 – 18 July 2021
- Champions: Simba
- Matches: 306
- Goals: 590 (1.93 per match)
- Top goalscorer: (Tanzania) John Bocco (16 goals)
- All statistics correct as of 13 March 2022.

The 2021–22 Tanzanian Premier League (known as the NBC Premier League for sponsorship reasons) is the 56th season of the Tanzanian Premier League, the top-tier football league in Tanzania (mainland only), since its establishment in 1965. The season started on 6 August 2020. The season ended with Simba S.C. clinching their 21st premier league title.

== Stadiums ==
| Team | Location | Stadium | Capacity |
|---|---|---|---|
| Simba S.C. | Dar es Salaam | National Stadium (Tanzania) | 60,000 |
| Young Africans | Dar es Salaam | National Stadium (Tanzania) | 60,000 |
| Azam F.C. | Dar es Salaam | Chamazi Stadium | 10,000 |
| Biashara United | Musoma | Karume Football Stadium | 2,500 |
| Kinondoni Municipal Council F.C. | Dar es Salaam | Uhuru Stadium | 23,000 |
| Polisi Morogoro | Morogoro | Jamhuri Stadium | 20,000 |
| Prisons F.C. | Mbeya | Sokoine Stadium | 20,000 |
| Dodoma Jiji FC | Dodoma | Jamhuri Stadium | 30,000 |
| Namungo FC | Lindi | Majaliwa Stadium | 2,000 |
| Mbeya City F.C. | Mbeya | Sokoine Stadium | 20,000 |
| Ruvu Shooting F.C. | Dar es Salaam | Uhuru Stadium | 23,000 |
| Kagera Sugar F.C. | Bukoba | Kaitaba Stadium | 5,000 |
| Coastal Union F.C. | Tanga | Mkwakwani Stadium | 15,000 |
| Mtibwa Sugar F.C. | Turiani | Manungu Stadium | 5,000 |
| Gwambina F.C. | Misungwi | Gwambina Stadium | 15,000 |
| JKT Tanzania F.C. | Dar es Salaam | Isamuyo Stadium | 1,000 |
| Ihefu F.C. | Ubaruku | Highland Estate Stadium | 1,000 |
| Mwadui F.C. | Shinyanga | Kambarage Stadium | 30,000 |

== League table ==
| Pos | Team | Pld | W | D | L | GF | GA | GD | Pts | Qualification or relegation |
|---|---|---|---|---|---|---|---|---|---|---|
| 1 | Simba (C) | 34 | 26 | 5 | 3 | 78 | 14 | +64 | 83 | Qualification for Champions League |
| 2 | Young Africans | 34 | 21 | 11 | 2 | 52 | 21 | +31 | 74 | Qualification for Confederation Cup |
| 3 | Azam | 34 | 19 | 11 | 4 | 50 | 22 | +28 | 68 | |
| 4 | Biashara United | 34 | 13 | 11 | 10 | 28 | 32 | −4 | 50 | |
| 5 | KMC | 34 | 13 | 9 | 12 | 39 | 27 | +12 | 48 | |
| 6 | Polisi Morogoro | 34 | 10 | 15 | 9 | 29 | 27 | +2 | 45 | |
| 7 | Prisons | 34 | 10 | 14 | 10 | 25 | 25 | 0 | 44 | |
| 8 | Dodoma Jiji FC | 34 | 11 | 11 | 12 | 28 | 31 | −3 | 44 | |
| 9 | Namungo | 34 | 10 | 13 | 11 | 24 | 31 | −7 | 43 | |
| 10 | Mbeya City | 34 | 10 | 12 | 12 | 30 | 33 | −3 | 42 | |
| 11 | Ruvu Shooting | 34 | 11 | 8 | 15 | 34 | 38 | −4 | 41 | |
| 12 | Kagera Sugar | 34 | 10 | 10 | 14 | 34 | 38 | −4 | 40 | |
| 13 | Coastal Union | 34 | 10 | 10 | 14 | 29 | 46 | −17 | 40 | Qualification to Relegation play-offs |
| 14 | Mtibwa Sugar (O) | 34 | 10 | 9 | 15 | 21 | 31 | −10 | 39 | Qualification to Relegation play-offs |
| 15 | JKT Tanzania (R) | 34 | 11 | 6 | 17 | 34 | 47 | −13 | 39 | Relegation |
| 16 | Gwambina F.C. (R) | 34 | 8 | 11 | 15 | 29 | 37 | −8 | 35 | Relegation |
| 17 | Ihefu F.C. (R) | 34 | 9 | 8 | 17 | 22 | 41 | −19 | 35 | Relegation |
| 18 | Mwadui (R) | 34 | 5 | 4 | 25 | 24 | 69 | −45 | 19 | Relegation |

Source: XScores
Rules for classification: 1) Points; 2) Goal difference; 3) Goals scored; 4) Head-to-head points; 5) Head-to-head goal difference; 6) Head-to-head goals scored; 7) Play-off
(C) Champions; (O) Play-off winners; (R) Relegated

== Relegation play-offs ==
=== Semi-finals ===
==== First leg ====
| 24 July 2021 | Coastal Union | 3–1 | Pamba S.C. |
| 16:00 | A.H. Suleiman 31'; A.H. Suleiman 72'; Saimon 90' (o.g.) | Report | Mwangosi 10' (o.g.) |

| 24 July 2021 | Mtibwa Sugar | 0–1 | Transit Camp |
| 16:00 | | Report | Waranga 57' |

==== Second leg ====
| 24 July 2021 | Pamba S.C. | 2–2 | Coastal Union |
| 16:00 | Ambrose 10' (o.g.); Haule 79' (pen.) | Report | A.H. Suleiman 1'; Hafidh 88' |

| 24 July 2021 | Transit Camp | 1–4 | Mtibwa Sugar |
| 16:00 | Waranga 16' | Report | Hilika 9'; Sabato 12'; Hilika 70'; Hilika 84' |

== Statistics ==
=== Multiple hat-tricks ===
| Player | For | Against | Score | Date |
|---|---|---|---|---|
| (Tanzania) Adam Omar | JKT | Mwadui | 1-6 | 25 October 2020 |
| (Tanzania) John Bocco | Simba | Coastal Union | 0-7 | 21 November 2020 |
| (Tanzania) Modathir Said | Coastal Union | Mwadui | 5-0 | 15 July 2021 |
| (Tanzania) Juma Luizio | Mbeya City | Biashara United | 4-0 | 18 July 2021 |
| (Tanzania) Ibrahim Hilika | Mtibwa Sugar | Transit Camp | 1-4 | 24 July 2021 |

== Attendances ==
| # | Football club | Total attendance | Home games | Average attendance |
|---|---|---|---|---|
| 1 | Young Africans | 141,681 | 17 | 8,334 |
| 2 | Simba SC | 138,518 | 17 | 8,148 |
| 3 | Dodoma Jiji | 27,455 | 17 | 1,615 |
| 4 | JKT Tanzania | 25,062 | 17 | 1,474 |
| 5 | Mwadui FC | 22,232 | 17 | 1,308 |
| 6 | Coastal Union | 22,023 | 17 | 1,295 |
| 7 | Mbeya City | 20,298 | 17 | 1,194 |
| 8 | Polisi Tanzania | 20,201 | 17 | 1,188 |
| 9 | Ihefu FC | 19,903 | 17 | 1,171 |
| 10 | Ruvu Shooting | 18,930 | 17 | 1,114 |
| 11 | Tanzania Prisons | 18,360 | 17 | 1,080 |
| 12 | Kagera Sugar | 17,307 | 17 | 1,018 |
| 13 | Gwambina FC | 16,536 | 17 | 973 |
| 14 | Mtibwa Sugar | 16,240 | 17 | 955 |
| 15 | KMC FC | 15,703 | 17 | 924 |
| 16 | Biashara United | 13,868 | 17 | 816 |
| 17 | Azam FC | 11,465 | 17 | 674 |
| 18 | Namungo FC | 10,758 | 17 | 633 |
