= Clatous Chama =

Zambian footballer (born 1991)

Personal information
- Full name: Clatous Chota Chama
- Date of birth: 18 June 1991 (age 35)
- Place of birth: Mansa, Zambia
- Height: 1.73 m (5 ft 8 in)
- Position: Attacking midfielder

Team information
- Current team: Simba SC
- Number: 17

Senior career*
Years	Team	Apps	(Gls)
2012–2013	Power Dynamos		(1+)
2013	Nchanga Rangers		(1)
2014–2016	ZESCO United		(18)
2017	Al Ittihad Alexandria	0	(0)
2017–2018	Lusaka Dynamos		(8)
2018–2024	Simba SC	51+	(21+)
2021–2022	→ RS Berkane (loan)	10	(0)
2024–2025	Young Africans	23	(6)
2025–2026	Singida Black Stars		
2026–	Simba SC		

International career^{‡}
2015–	Zambia	44	(7)
- * Club domestic league appearances and goals as of 24 February 2026 ‡ National team caps and goals as of 25 March 2025

Clatous Chota Chama (born 18 June 1991), also known as Mwamba wa Lusaka, is a Zambian professional footballer who plays as an attacking midfielder for Tanzanian Premier League club Simba SC and the Zambia national team. He is known for his goalscoring, playmaking, leadership, penalty taking and work rate.

== Club career ==
Chama helped ZESCO United F.C. reach the semi-finals of the CAF Champions League before signing a 3-year contract with Egyptian side Al Ittihad. However, in February 2017, he left the club before making an official appearance. Chama played for Lusaka Dynamos F.C. before joining Tanzania's Simba FC in 2018. https://www.pulsesports.ug/football/story/clatous-chama-to-yanga-a-good-move-for-all-parties-2024070111593989315

== Career statistics ==
=== Club ===
Only partial league statistics are known.

Appearances and goals by club, season and competition
Club	Season	League		
Club	Season	Division	Apps	Goals
Power Dynamos	2012	Zambia Super League	?	?
Power Dynamos	2013	Zambia Super League	?	1
Nchanga Rangers	2013	Zambia Super League	?	1
ZESCO United	2014	Zambia Super League	?	3
ZESCO United	2015	Zambia Super League	?	8
ZESCO United	2016	Zambia Super League	?	7
Al Ittihad Alexandria	2016–17	Egyptian Premier League	0	0
Lusaka Dynamos	2017	Zambia Super League	?	4
Lusaka Dynamos	2018	Zambia Super League	?	4
Lusaka Dynamos	Total		?	28+
Simba SC	2018–19	Tanzanian Premier League	?	?
Simba SC	2019–20	Tanzanian Premier League	?	?
Simba SC	2020–21	Tanzanian Premier League	?	7
Simba SC	2021–22	Tanzanian Premier League	9	3
Simba SC	2022–23	Tanzanian Premier League	21	4
Simba SC	2023–24	Tanzanian Premier League	?	8
RS Berkane (loan)	2021–22	Botola Pro	10	0
Young Africans	2024–25	Tanzanian Premier League	23	6
Singida Black Stars	2025–26	Tanzanian Premier League	?	?
Simba SC	2025–26	Tanzanian Premier League	?	?
Career total			84+	55+

=== International ===
As of match played 25 March 2025.

Appearances and goals by national team and year
National team	Year	Apps	Goals
Zambia	2015	2	0
Zambia	2016	8	1
Zambia	2017	2	2
Zambia	2018	7	0
Zambia	2019	4	1
Zambia	2020	0	0
Zambia	2021	5	1
Zambia	2022	2	0
Zambia	2023	4	0
Zambia	2024	9	2
Zambia	2025	1	0
Total		44	7

Scores and results list Zambia's goal tally first.

No	Date	Venue	Opponent	Score	Result	Competition
1.	10 January 2016	UJ Stadium, Johannesburg, South Africa	Angola	1–1	2–1	Friendly
2.	16 July 2017	Somhlolo National Stadium, Lobamba, Swaziland	Swaziland	1–0	4–0	2018 African Nations Championship qualification
3.	16 July 2017	Somhlolo National Stadium, Lobamba, Swaziland	Swaziland	3–0	4–0	2018 African Nations Championship qualification
4.	10 October 2019	Stade Général Seyni Kountché, Niamey, Niger	Niger	1–0	1–1	Friendly
5.	25 March 2021	National Heroes Stadium, Lusaka, Zambia	Algeria	2–2	3–3	2021 Africa Cup of Nations qualification
6.	23 March 2024	Bingu National Stadium, Lilongwe, Malawi	Zimbabwe	2–0	2–2 (5–6 p)	2024 Four Nations Football Tournament
7.	26 March 2024	Bingu National Stadium, Lilongwe, Malawi	Malawi	1–0	2–1	2024 Four Nations Football Tournament

== Honours ==
=== Singida Black Stars ===
- CECAFA Club Championship
  - Winners (1): 2025 Kagame Interclub Cup
