= 2019–20 Tanzanian Premier League =

Tanzanian Premier League
- Season: 2019–20
- Champions: Simba
- Matches: 380
- Goals: 767 (2.02 per match)
- Top goalscorer: (Rwanda) Meddie Kagere (22 goals)

The 2019–20 Tanzanian Premier League (known as the Vodacom Premier League for sponsorship reasons) is the 55th season of the Tanzanian Premier League, the top-tier football league in Tanzania (mainland only), since its establishment in 1965. The season started on 24 August 2019.

The match between the Young Africans and Simba SC drew an attendance of 58,400, the highest in the league.

== League table ==
Pos	Team	Pld	W	D	L	GF	GA	GD	Pts	Qualification or relegation
1	Simba (C)	38	27	7	4	78	21	+57	88	Qualification for Champions League
2	Young Africans	38	19	15	4	45	28	+17	72	Qualification for Confederation Cup
3	Azam	38	20	10	8	52	26	+26	70	
4	Namungo	38	17	13	8	46	37	+9	64	
5	Polisi Morogoro	38	15	10	13	37	35	+2	55	
6	JKT Tanzania	38	13	15	10	34	32	+2	54	
7	Coastal Union	38	14	11	13	33	30	+3	53	
8	Kagera Sugar	38	15	7	16	44	41	+3	52	
9	Biashara United	38	12	14	12	29	27	+2	50	
10	Prisons	38	10	19	9	35	30	+5	49	
11	Mwadui	38	12	11	15	39	45	−6	47	
12	Ruvu Shooting	38	12	11	15	34	42	−8	47	
13	KMC	38	13	7	18	35	47	−12	46	
14	Mtibwa Sugar	38	11	12	15	30	34	−4	45	
15	Mbeya City (O)	38	12	9	17	33	42	−9	45	Qualification to Relegation play-offs
16	Mbao (R)	38	12	9	17	33	43	−10	45	Qualification to Relegation play-offs
17	Alliance Schools (R)	38	11	12	15	36	48	−12	45	Relegation
18	Lipuli (R)	38	12	8	18	43	51	−8	44	Relegation
19	Ndanda (R)	38	9	14	15	28	35	−7	41	Relegation
20	Singida United (R)	38	4	6	28	23	73	−50	18	Relegation

Source: Soccerway
Rules for classification: 1) Points; 2) Goal difference; 3) Goals scored; 4) Head-to-head points; 5) Head-to-head goal difference; 6) Head-to-head goals scored; 7) Play-off
(C) Champions; (O) Play-off winners; (R) Relegated

== Relegation play-offs ==
=== Semi-finals ===
==== First leg ====
29 July 2020	Geita Gold	1–1	Mbeya City	Geita
16:00	Kibingu 68' (o.g.)	Report	Ibrahim 41'

29 July 2020	Ihefu	2–0	Mbao	Highland Estate, Mbarali, Mbeya
16:00	Mwaijala 4' (pen.); Tangai 84'	Report

==== Second leg ====
1 August 2020	Mbeya City	1–0 (2–1 agg.)	Geita Gold	Mbeya
16:00	Mwenendo 11'	Report

1 August 2020	Mbao	4–2 (4–4 agg.)	Ihefu	CCM Kirumba Stadium
16:00	Waziri Junior 4', 44'; Masinda 47' (o.g.); Peter 92' (pen.)	Report	Kinyozi 40'; Mgaya 88'

== Statistics ==
=== Multiple hat-tricks ===
Player	For	Against	Score	Date
(Tanzania) Ditram Nchimbi	Polisi	Yanga	3-3	3 October 2019
(Tanzania) Saliboko Daluwesh	Lipuli	Singida United	5-1	6 November 2019
(Zambia) Aubrey Chirwa	Azam	Alliance	0-5	26 November 2019
(Tanzania) Kevin Sabato	Kagera Sugar	Singida United	3-0	1 February 2020
(Tanzania) David Richard	Alliance	Mwadui	4-1	19 February 2020
(Rwanda) Meddie Kagere^{4}	Simba	Singida United	8-0	11 March 2020
(Tanzania) Green Atupele	Biashara United	KMC	4-0	24 June 2020
(Zambia) Aubrey Chirwa^{4}	Azam	Singida United	7-0	5 July 2020

- ^{4} Player scored 4 goals
