= Meddie Kagere =

Footballer (born 1986)

Personal information
- Full name: Meddie Kagere Mwijaku
- Date of birth: 10 October 1986 (age 40)
- Place of birth: Kampala, Uganda
- Height: 1.81 m (5 ft 11 in)
- Position: Forward

Team information
- Current team: Namungo

Senior career*
Years	Team	Apps	(Gls)
2004–2006	Mbale Heroes FC		
2006	ATRACO FC		
2007–2008	Kiyovu Sports		
2008–2009	Mukura Victory		
2010–2012	Police FC	40	(38)
2012	ES Zarzis	11	(0)
2013	Police FC		
2013–2014	Rayon Sports		(9)
2014–2015	KF Tirana	16	(1)
2015–2018	Gor Mahia	83	(43)
2018–2022	Simba	76	(52)
2022–2023	Singida Fountain Gate	20	(8)
2024-	Namungo	13	(4)

International career^{‡}
2011–	Rwanda	59	(15)
- * Club domestic league appearances and goals ‡ National team caps and goals as of 27 March 2023

Meddie Kagere (born 10 October 1986) is a professional footballer who plays as a forward for Tanzanian Premier League club Namungo FC. Born in Uganda, he plays for the Rwanda national team at international level.

== Career ==
=== KF Tirana ===
Kagere signed for his first European club during the summer transfer window of 2014, when he joined Albanian Superliga side KF Tirana on a two-year deal after agreeing to pay his previous club Rayon Sports FC the $10,000 release clause in his contract. On 1 January 2015, Kagere was released by KF Tirana.

=== Simba S.C. ===
Having impressed in the 2018 SportPesa Super Cup, when he was the Gor Mahia F.C player, scored the first goal against Simba S.C., finally the Tanzanian Premier League champions, signed him after weeks of rumours.

=== Singida Big Stars ===
On 4 August 2022, during Singida Big Stars Day, Kagere was seen training before the match against Zanaco F.C. of Zambia confirming rumors that Kagere has departed Simba S.C. thus Kagere is a new big signing for them after Singida Singida Big Stars has been promoted to Tanzania Premier League for the first time in 2022–23 season.

== Career statistics ==
=== Club ===
Appearances and goals by club, season and competition
Club	Season	League			Cup		Continental		Others		Total	
Club	Season	Division	Apps	Goals	Apps	Goals	Apps	Goals	Apps	Goals	Apps	Goals
ES Zarzis	2011–12	Tunisian Ligue Professionnelle 1	4	0								
ES Zarzis	2012–13	Tunisian Ligue Professionnelle 1	7	0								
ES Zarzis	Total		13	0								
Rayon Sports	2013–14	Rwandan Premier League		9								
KF Tirana	2014–15	Kategoria Superiore	16	1	3	0						
Gor Mahia	2015	Kenyan Premier League	30	13								
Gor Mahia	2016	Kenyan Premier League	13	3								
Gor Mahia	2017	Kenyan Premier League	33	13								
Gor Mahia	2018	Kenyan Premier League	15	6								
Gor Mahia	Total		91	35								
Simba S.C.	2018–19	Tanzanian Premier League		23								
Simba S.C.	2019–20	Tanzanian Premier League		22								
Simba S.C.	2020–21	Tanzanian Premier League		13								
Simba S.C.	2021–22	Tanzanian Premier League		7								
Simba S.C.	Total			65								
Singida Fountain Gate	2022–23	Tanzanian Premier League		7								
Singida Fountain Gate	2023–24	Tanzanian Premier League										
Singida Fountain Gate	Total											
Career total												

=== International ===
Scores and results list Rwanda's goal tally first.

No.	Date	Venue	Opponent	Score	Result	Competition
1.	9 October 2011	Stade de l'Amitié, Cotonou, Benin	Benin	1–0	1–0	2012 Africa Cup of Nations qualification
2.	29 November 2011	National Stadium, Dar es Salaam, Tanzania	Zimbabwe	1–0	2–0	2011 CECAFA Cup
3.	29 November 2011	National Stadium, Dar es Salaam, Tanzania	Zimbabwe	2–0	2–0	2011 CECAFA Cup
4.	5 December 2011	National Stadium, Dar es Salaam, Tanzania	Zanzibar	2–1	2–1	2011 CECAFA Cup
5.	10 December 2011	National Stadium, Dar es Salaam, Tanzania	Uganda	1–0	2–2 (2–3 p)	2011 CECAFA Cup
6.	10 December 2011	National Stadium, Dar es Salaam, Tanzania	Uganda	2–1	2–2 (2–3 p)	2011 CECAFA Cup
7.	6 December 2013	Amahoro Stadium, Kigali, Rwanda	Uganda	1–1	2–2	Friendly
8.	24 March 2013	Amahoro Stadium, Kigali, Rwanda	Mali	1–0	1–2	2014 FIFA World Cup qualification
9.	9 June 2013	Stade du 26 Mars, Bamako, Mali	Mali	1–0	1–1	2014 FIFA World Cup qualification
10.	27 July 2014	Stade Augustin Monédan de Sibang, Libreville, Gabon	Gabon	1–0	1–0	Friendly
11.	2 August 2014	Stade Régional Nyamirambo, Kigali, Rwanda	Congo	2–0	2–0 (4–3 p)	2015 Africa Cup of Nations qualification
12.	9 September 2018	Stade Régional Nyamirambo, Kigali, Rwanda	Ivory Coast	1–2	1–2	2019 Africa Cup of Nations qualification
13.	5 September 2019	Stade Linité, Victoria, Seychelles	Seychelles	3–0	3–0	2022 FIFA World Cup qualification
14.	10 September 2019	Stade Régional Nyamirambo, Kigali, Rwanda	Seychelles	2–0	7–0	2022 FIFA World Cup qualification
15.	10 September 2019	Stade Régional Nyamirambo, Kigali, Rwanda	Seychelles	5–0	7–0	2022 FIFA World Cup qualification
