= 2018–19 Tanzanian Premier League =

Tanzanian Premier League
- Season: 2018–19
- Champions: Simba
- Matches: 380
- Goals: 746 (1.96 per match)
- Top goalscorer: (Rwanda) Meddie Kagere (23 goals)

The 2018–19 Tanzanian Premier League is the 54th season of the Tanzanian Premier League, the top-tier football league in Tanzania (mainland only), since its establishment in 1965. The season started on 22 August 2018.

== League table ==
Pos	Team	Pld	W	D	L	GF	GA	GD	Pts	Qualification or relegation
1	Simba (C)	38	29	6	3	77	15	+62	93	Qualification for Champions League
2	Young Africans (Q)	38	27	5	6	56	27	+29	86	Qualification for Champions League
3	Azam (Q)	38	21	12	5	54	21	+33	75	Qualification for Confederation Cup (Note: Azam are Tanzania FA Cup winners.)
4	KMC (Q)	38	13	16	9	40	25	+15	55	Qualification for Confederation Cup
5	Mtibwa Sugar	38	14	8	16	36	34	+2	50	
6	Lipuli	38	12	13	13	32	40	−8	49	
7	Mbeya City	38	13	9	16	38	39	−1	48	
8	Coastal Union	38	11	15	12	32	42	−10	48	
9	Ndanda	38	12	12	14	25	37	−12	48	
10	JKT Tanzania	38	11	14	13	29	35	−6	47	
11	Alliance Schools	38	12	11	15	34	43	−9	47	
12	Prisons	38	11	13	14	30	31	−1	46	
13	Singida United	38	11	13	14	30	39	−9	46	
14	Biashara United	38	11	12	15	30	35	−5	45	
15	Ruvu Shooting	38	11	12	15	35	43	−8	45	
16	Mbao	38	11	12	15	27	41	−14	45	
17	Mwadui (O)	38	12	8	18	47	52	−5	44	Relegation playoffs
18	Kagera Sugar (O)	38	10	14	14	33	43	−10	44	Relegation playoffs
19	Stand United (R)	38	12	8	18	38	50	−12	44	Relegation
20	African Lyon (R)	38	4	11	23	23	54	−31	23	Relegation

Source: Soccerway
(C) Champions; (O) Play-off winners; (Q) Qualified for the phase indicated; (R) Relegated

== Statistics ==
=== Multiple hat-tricks ===
Player	For	Against	Score	Date
(Kenya) Alexis Kitenga	Stand U	Yanga	4-3	16 September 2018
(Uganda) Emmanuel Okwi	Simba	Ruvu Shooting	0-5	28 October 2018
(Tanzania) Salim Aiyee	Mwadui	Kagera Sugar	4-0	6 January 2019
(Rwanda) Meddie Kagere	Simba	Coastal Union	8-1	8 May 2019
(Uganda) Emmanuel Okwi	Simba	Coastal Union	8-1	8 May 2019
