= 2016–17 Tanzanian Premier League =

Tanzanian Premier League
- Season: 20 August 2016 – 20 May 2017
- Champions: Young Africans
- Matches played: 240
- Goals scored: 474 (1.98 per match)
- Top goalscorer: (Tanzania) Simon Msuva (14 goals)

The 2016–17 Tanzanian Premier League is the 52nd season of top-tier football in Tanzania. The season started on 20 August 2016 and concluded on 20 May 2017.

== League table ==
Pos	Team	Pld	W	D	L	GF	GA	GD	Pts	Qualification or relegation
1	Young Africans (C)	30	21	5	4	57	14	+43	68	Qualification for 2018 CAF Champions League
2	Simba	30	21	5	4	50	17	+33	68	Qualification for 2018 CAF Confederation Cup
3	Kagera Sugar	30	15	8	7	33	26	+7	53	
4	Azam	30	14	10	6	36	20	+16	52	
5	Mtibwa Sugar	30	10	14	6	34	32	+2	44	
6	Stand United	30	9	11	10	25	26	−1	38	
7	Ruvu Shooting	30	8	12	10	28	33	−5	36	
8	Prisons	30	8	11	11	17	24	−7	35	
9	Maji Maji	30	10	5	15	26	38	−12	35	
10	Mwadui	30	10	5	15	32	45	−13	35	
11	Mbeya City	30	7	12	11	27	32	−5	33	
12	Mbao	30	9	6	15	30	38	−8	33	
13	Ndanda	30	9	6	15	23	38	−15	33	
14	African Lyon (R)	30	6	14	10	19	28	−9	32	Relegation to Tanzanian First Division League
15	Toto African (R)	30	7	8	15	22	34	−12	29	Relegation to Tanzanian First Division League
16	JKT Ruvu Stars (R)	30	3	14	13	15	29	−14	23	Relegation to Tanzanian First Division League

Updated to match(es) played on 23 May 2017. Source: Standings
Rules for classification: 1) points; 2) goal difference; 3) number of goals scored.
(C) Champions; (R) Relegated
