= 2023–24 Tanzanian Premier League =

Tanzanian Premier League
- Season: 2023–24
- Dates: 15 August 2023 – 28 May 2024
- Champions: Young Africans
- Relegated: Geita Gold; Mtibwa Sugar
- Champions League: Azam; Young Africans
- Confederation Cup: Coastal Union; Simba
- Matches: 139
- Goals: 306 (2.2 per match)
- Top goalscorer: (Burkina Faso) Stephane Aziz Ki (21 goals)

The 2023–24 Tanzanian Premier League (known as the NBC Premier League for sponsorship reasons) was the 59th season of the Tanzanian Premier League, the top-tier football league in Tanzania (mainland only), since its establishment in 1965. The season started on 15 August 2023 and ended on 28 May 2024.

The winners (Young Africans, their third consecutive title win and twenty-seventh overall) and runners-up (Azam) qualified for the Champions League. The third and fourth-placed teams (Simba and Coastal Union) qualified for the Confederation Cup. The thirteenth and fourteenth-placed teams (JKT Tanzania and Tabora United) qualified for the Tanzanian Premier League play-off, both winning and retaining their places in the league. The bottom two teams (Geita Gold and Mtibwa Sugar) were relegated to the 2024–25 Tanzanian Championship League.

== Teams ==
The league consisted of 16 teams; the top 13 teams from the previous season, and three teams promoted from the Tanzanian Championship League. Young Africans entered the season as defending champions (for the second consecutive season), clinching their 26th Premier League title during the previous season.

JKT Tanzania and Tabora United were promoted as champions and runners-up of the 2022–23 Tanzanian Championship League, replacing the 2022–23 Tanzanian Premier League bottom two teams (Polisi Morogoro and Ruvu Shooting). Fourth-placed Championship side Mashujaa were also promoted after defeating fourteenth-placed Premier League side Mbeya City in the Tanzanian Premier League play-off to take their place in the league.

=== Locations ===
Location of clubs in Tanzania for the 2023–24 Tanzanian Premier League season

== League table ==
| Pos | Team | Pld | W | D | L | GF | GA | GD | Pts | Qualification or relegation |
|---|---|---|---|---|---|---|---|---|---|---|
| 1 | Young Africans (C) | 30 | 26 | 2 | 2 | 71 | 14 | +57 | 80 | Qualification for the Champions League |
| 2 | Azam | 30 | 21 | 6 | 3 | 63 | 21 | +42 | 69 | Qualification for the Champions League |
| 3 | Simba | 30 | 21 | 6 | 3 | 59 | 25 | +34 | 69 | Qualification for the Confederation Cup (Note: The 2023–24 Tanzania FA Cup winners also qualified for the Confederation Cup. Since the cup winners (Young Africans) qualified based on league position, the Confederation Cup spot was passed to the fourth-placed team.) |
| 4 | Coastal Union | 30 | 11 | 10 | 9 | 22 | 19 | +3 | 43 | Qualification for the Confederation Cup |
| 5 | Kinondoni MC | 30 | 8 | 13 | 9 | 27 | 39 | −12 | 37 | |
| 6 | Namungo | 30 | 8 | 12 | 10 | 27 | 29 | −2 | 36 | |
| 7 | Ihefu | 30 | 9 | 9 | 12 | 29 | 36 | −7 | 36 | |
| 8 | Mashujaa | 30 | 9 | 8 | 13 | 30 | 33 | −3 | 35 | |
| 9 | Prisons | 30 | 7 | 13 | 10 | 29 | 35 | −6 | 34 | |
| 10 | Kagera Sugar | 30 | 7 | 13 | 10 | 23 | 32 | −9 | 34 | |
| 11 | Singida Fountain Gate | 30 | 8 | 9 | 13 | 29 | 39 | −10 | 33 | |
| 12 | Dodoma Jiji | 30 | 8 | 9 | 13 | 19 | 32 | −13 | 33 | |
| 13 | JKT Tanzania (O) | 30 | 6 | 14 | 10 | 21 | 30 | −9 | 32 | Qualification for the Tanzanian Premier League play-off |
| 14 | Tabora United (O) | 30 | 5 | 12 | 13 | 20 | 41 | −21 | 27 | Qualification for the Tanzanian Premier League play-off |
| 15 | Geita Gold (R) | 30 | 5 | 10 | 15 | 18 | 38 | −20 | 25 | Relegation to the Tanzanian Championship League |
| 16 | Mtibwa Sugar (R) | 30 | 5 | 6 | 19 | 30 | 54 | −24 | 21 | Relegation to the Tanzanian Championship League |

Source: Flashscore, Soccerway
Rules for classification: 1) Points; 2) Goal difference; 3) Goals scored; 4) Head-to-head points; 5) Head-to-head goal difference; 6) Head-to-head goals scored; 7) Play-off
(C) Champions; (O) Play-off winners; (R) Relegated

== Results ==
Each team plays each other twice (30 matches each), once at home and once away.

| Home \ Away | AZA | COA | DOM | GGF | IHF | JKT | KAG | KMC | MAS | MTI | NAM | PRI | SIM | SIN | TAB | YGA |
|---|---|---|---|---|---|---|---|---|---|---|---|---|---|---|---|---|
| Azam | — | 1–1 | 4–1 | 2–1 | 1–0 | 2–1 | 5–1 | 5–0 | 0–0 | 5–0 | 1–3 | 3–1 | 0–3 | 2–1 | 4–0 | 2–1 |
| Coastal Union | 0–1 | — | 1–0 | 3–1 | 1–0 | 0–0 | 1–0 | 0–0 | 2–0 | 1–0 | 0–0 | 0–0 | 1–2 | 2–0 | 0–0 | 0–1 |
| Dodoma Jiji | 0–0 | 2–1 | — | 0–1 | 1–0 | 0–0 | 1–0 | 1–0 | 1–1 | 1–1 | 0–0 | 0–0 | 0–1 | 1–2 | 1–0 | 0–4 |
| Geita Gold | 0–2 | 0–0 | 2–2 | — | 1–2 | 1–0 | 0–0 | 1–2 | 1–3 | 2–2 | 1–0 | 0–0 | 0–1 | 1–0 | 0–0 | 0–3 |
| Ihefu | 1–3 | 0–0 | 0–2 | 0–1 | — | 0–0 | 1–0 | 1–0 | 1–1 | 5–1 | 2–0 | 0–0 | 1–1 | 1–1 | 2–1 | 2–1 |
| JKT Tanzania | 0–2 | 0–1 | 0–1 | 2–0 | 1–1 | — | 1–1 | 1–1 | 1–0 | 2–1 | 0–0 | 1–1 | 0–1 | 1–1 | 1–0 | 0–0 |
| Kagera Sugar | 0–4 | 1–2 | 1–1 | 1–0 | 2–1 | 1–1 | — | 1–1 | 1–1 | 0–0 | 1–1 | 2–1 | 1–1 | 1–0 | 0–0 | 0–0 |
| Kinondoni MC | 1–2 | 0–0 | 1–2 | 1–1 | 1–0 | 2–1 | 0–0 | — | 3–2 | 1–0 | 2–2 | 1–1 | 2–2 | 1–0 | 4–2 | 0–3 |
| Mashujaa | 0–3 | 1–2 | 3–0 | 0–0 | 2–0 | 1–0 | 2–0 | 3–0 | — | 3–2 | 1–0 | 0–2 | 0–1 | 1–3 | 1–1 | 0–1 |
| Mtibwa Sugar | 0–2 | 1–1 | 0–0 | 3–1 | 2–3 | 1–2 | 0–2 | 0–1 | 2–1 | — | 0–0 | 2–1 | 2–4 | 0–1 | 3–0 | 1–3 |
| Namungo | 0–2 | 1–0 | 1–0 | 2–0 | 2–0 | 0–1 | 1–0 | 1–1 | 0–0 | 1–0 | — | 2–2 | 2–2 | 2–3 | 3–2 | 1–3 |
| Prisons | 1–1 | 0–1 | 1–0 | 0–0 | 0–1 | 1–1 | 0–0 | 1–1 | 1–2 | 3–2 | 1–0 | — | 1–3 | 3–1 | 2–1 | 1–2 |
| Simba | 1–1 | 3–0 | 2–0 | 4–1 | 2–1 | 2–0 | 3–0 | 1–0 | 2–0 | 2–0 | 1–1 | 1–2 | — | 3–1 | 2–0 | 1–5 |
| Singida Fountain Gate | 0–1 | 2–1 | 2–0 | 2–1 | 2–2 | 2–2 | 2–3 | 0–0 | 0–0 | 0–2 | 1–0 | 0–0 | 1–2 | — | 0–0 | 0–3 |
| Tabora United | 0–0 | 1–0 | 2–1 | 0–0 | 1–1 | 1–1 | 0–3 | 0–0 | 1–0 | 2–1 | 1–1 | 3–1 | 0–4 | 1–1 | — | 0–1 |
| Young Africans | 3–2 | 1–0 | 1–0 | 1–0 | 5–0 | 5–0 | 1–0 | 5–0 | 2–1 | 4–1 | 1–0 | 4–1 | 2–1 | 2–0 | 3–0 | — |

Source: Flashscore, Soccerway
Legend: Blue = home team win; Yellow = draw; Red = away team win.

== Tanzanian Premier League play-off ==
The 13th and 14th-placed teams (JKT Tanzania and Tabora United) qualified for the Tanzanian Premier League play-off, alongside the 3rd and 4th-placed teams from the 2023–24 Tanzanian Championship League (Mbeya Kwanza and Biashara United). The Championship teams faced each other over two legs; the Premier League teams then also faced each other over two legs, with the winners remaining in the Tanzanian Premier League and the losers competing against the Championship play-off winners for the final place in the following season's Tanzanian Premier League.

=== Quarter-finals ===
==== First leg ====
| 19 May 2024 | Biashara United | 2–0 | Mbeya Kwanza | Musoma |
| | Katonda 22'; Zilintusa 33' | | | Stadium: Karume Football Stadium |

==== Second leg ====
| 26 May 2024 | Mbeya Kwanza | 0–2 (0–4 agg.) | Biashara United | Mtwara |
| | | | Lukindo; Katonda | Stadium: Nangwanda Sijaona Stadium |

=== Semi-finals ===
==== First leg ====
| 4 June 2024 | Tabora United | 0–4 | JKT Tanzania | Tabora |
| | | | Ndemla 10'; Kada 22'; Mateo 82'; Dilunga 90+3' | Stadium: Ali Hassan Mwinyi Stadium |

==== Second leg ====
| 8 June 2024 | JKT Tanzania | 0–0 (4–0 agg.) | Tabora United | Karatu |
| | | | | Stadium: Black Rhino Academy Stadium |

=== Final ===
==== First leg ====
| 12 June 2024 | Biashara United | 1–0 | Tabora United | Musoma |
| | Lukindo 90+4' (pen.) | | | Stadium: Karume Football Stadium |

==== Second leg ====
| 16 June 2024 | Tabora United | 2–0 (2–1 agg.) | Biashara United | Tabora |
| | Lembo 27' (pen.), 56' | | | Stadium: Ali Hassan Mwinyi Stadium |

== Statistics ==
=== Top goalscorers ===
| Rank | Player | Club | Goals |
|---|---|---|---|
| 1 | (Burkina Faso) Stephane Aziz Ki | Yanga | 21 |
| 2 | (Tanzania) Feisal Salum | Azam | 19 |
| 3 | (Tanzania) Waziri Shentembo | KMC | 12 |
| 4 | (Democratic Republic of the Congo) Maxi Mpia Nzengeli | Yanga | 11 |
| 4 | (Burundi) Saidi Ntibazonkiza | Simba | 11 |
| 6 | (Ivory Coast) Kipre Junior | Azam | 10 |
| 7 | (Togo) Marouf Tchakei | Ihefu | 9 |
| 7 | (Tanzania) Mudathir Yahya | Yanga | 9 |
| 9 | (Democratic Republic of the Congo) Jean Baleke Othos | Simba | 8 |
| 9 | (Tanzania) Reliants Lusajo | Mashujaa | 8 |
| 9 | (Tanzania) Samsoni Mbangula | Tanzania Prisons S.C | 8 |
| 9 | (The Gambia) Gibril Sillah | Azam | 8 |

=== Top clean sheets ===
| Rank | Goalkeepers | Team | Clean sheets |
|---|---|---|---|
| 1 | (Democratic Republic of the Congo) Ley Matampi | Coastal Union | 15 |
| 2 | (Mali) Djigui Diarra | Yanga | 13 |
| 3 | (Tanzania) Constantine Malimi | Geita Gold | 10 |
| 3 | (Burundi) Jonathan Nahimana | Namungo | 10 |
| 5 | (Nigeria) John Noble | Tabora United | 9 |
| 6 | (Tanzania) Yona Amosi | Tanzania Prisons | 8 |
| 6 | (Morocco) Ayoub Lakred | Simba | 8 |
| 8 | (Tanzania) Mohamed Hussein | Dodoma Jiji | 7 |
| 8 | (Sudan) Mohamed Mustapha | Azam | 7 |

=== Multiple hat-tricks ===
| Player | For | Against | Score | Date |
|---|---|---|---|---|
| (Tanzania) Feisal Salum | Azam | Tabora United | 4-0 | 16 August 2023 |
| (Democratic Republic of the Congo) Jean Baleke Othos | Simba | Coastal Union | 3-0 | 21 September 2023 |
| (Burkina Faso) Stephane Aziz Ki | Yanga | Azam | 3-2 | 23 October 2023 |
| (Ivory Coast) Kipre Tiagori | Azam | Mtiwba Sugar | 5-0 | 24 November 2023 |
| (Tanzania) Waziri Shentembo | KMC | Tabora United | 4-2 | 10 March 2024 |
| (Burkina Faso) Stephane Aziz Ki | Yanga | Tanzania Prisons | 4-1 | 28 May 2024 |

== TFF Awards ==
NBC Team of the Year 2024

| Award | Winner | Club |
|---|---|---|
| Premier League Coach of the Season | (Argentina) Miguel Gamondi | Young Africans S.C. |
| Premier League Player of the Season | (Burkina Faso) Stephane Aziz Ki | Young Africans S.C. |
| Premier League Top Scorer of the Season | (Burkina Faso) Stephane Aziz Ki | Young Africans S.C. |
| Premier League Best Midfielder | (Burkina Faso) Stephane Aziz Ki | Young Africans S.C. |
| Premier League Best Defender of the Season | (Tanzania) Ibrahim Bacca | Young Africans S.C. |
| Premier League Goal of the Season | (Ivory Coast) Kipre Junior | Azam F.C. |
| Premier League Young Player of the Season | (Tanzania) Raheem Shomar | KMC |

NBC Team of the Year 2023/2024
| Goalkeeper | (Democratic Republic of the Congo) Ley Matampi (Coastal Union F.C.) | | | |
| Defenders | (Ivory Coast) Yao Kouassi (Young Africans S.C.) | (Tanzania) Bacca (Young Africans S.C.) | (Tanzania) Job (Young Africans S.C.) | (Tanzania) Tshabalala (Simba S.C.) |
| Midfielders | (Democratic Republic of the Congo) Maxi Nzegeli (Young Africans S.C.) | | (Tanzania) Mudathir (Young Africans S.C.) | (Tanzania) Feisal (Azam F.C.) |
| Forwards | (Burkina Faso) Stephane Aziz Ki (Young Africans S.C.) | | (Tanzania) Waziri Jr (KMC) | (Ivory Coast) Kipre Junior (Azam F.C.) |

== Attendances ==
Young Africans SC drew the highest average home attendance in the 2023-24 edition of the Tanzanian Premier League, followed by rivals Simba SC.

| # | Football club | Total attendance | Home games | Average attendance |
|---|---|---|---|---|
| 1 | Young Africans | 141,911 | 15 | 9,460 |
| 2 | Simba SC | 112,717 | 15 | 7,514 |
| 3 | Mashujaa | 45,638 | 15 | 3,042 |
| 4 | Tabora United | 43,808 | 15 | 2,920 |
| 5 | Azam FC | 35,379 | 15 | 2,358 |
| 6 | Dodoma Jiji | 30,381 | 15 | 2,025 |
| 7 | Geita Gold | 24,774 | 15 | 1,651 |
| 8 | Coastal Union | 24,161 | 15 | 1,610 |
| 9 | Tanzania Prisons | 24,147 | 15 | 1,609 |
| 10 | Singida Fountain Gate | 21,154 | 15 | 1,410 |
| 11 | KMC FC | 15,495 | 15 | 1,033 |
| 12 | Ihefu FC | 15,075 | 15 | 1,005 |
| 13 | Namungo FC | 14,202 | 15 | 946 |
| 14 | Kagera Sugar | 12,323 | 15 | 821 |
| 15 | JKT Mgambo | 9,397 | 15 | 626 |
| 16 | Mtibwa Sugar | 7,529 | 15 | 501 |
