= 2017–18 Tanzanian Premier League =

Tanzanian Premier League
- Season: 2017–18
- Champions: Simba
- Matches played: 240
- Goals scored: 470 (1.96 per match)
- Top goalscorer: (Uganda) Emmanuel Okwi (20 goals)

The 2017–18 Tanzanian Premier League is the 53rd season of top-tier football in Tanzania. The season started on 26 August 2017 and ended on 28 May 2018.

== Final standings ==
| Pos | Team | Pld | W | D | L | GF | GA | GD | Pts | Qualification or relegation |
|---|---|---|---|---|---|---|---|---|---|---|
| 1 | Simba | 30 | 20 | 9 | 1 | 62 | 15 | +47 | 69 | Champions |
| 2 | Azam | 30 | 16 | 10 | 4 | 35 | 16 | +19 | 58 | |
| 3 | Young Africans | 30 | 14 | 10 | 6 | 44 | 23 | +21 | 52 | |
| 4 | Tanzania Prisons | 30 | 12 | 12 | 6 | 27 | 22 | +5 | 48 | |
| 5 | Singida United | 30 | 11 | 11 | 8 | 30 | 28 | +2 | 44 | |
| 6 | Mtibwa Sugar | 30 | 10 | 11 | 9 | 23 | 21 | +2 | 41 | |
| 7 | Lipuli | 30 | 9 | 11 | 10 | 23 | 24 | −1 | 38 | |
| 8 | Ruvu Shooting | 30 | 9 | 11 | 10 | 31 | 37 | −6 | 38 | |
| 9 | Kagera Sugar | 30 | 8 | 13 | 9 | 23 | 27 | −4 | 37 | |
| 10 | Mwadui | 30 | 8 | 12 | 10 | 32 | 38 | −6 | 36 | |
| 11 | Stand United | 30 | 8 | 8 | 14 | 22 | 36 | −14 | 32 | |
| 12 | Mbeya City | 30 | 5 | 16 | 9 | 23 | 31 | −8 | 31 | |
| 13 | Mbao | 30 | 7 | 10 | 13 | 26 | 36 | −10 | 31 | |
| 14 | Ndanda | 30 | 6 | 11 | 13 | 23 | 31 | −8 | 29 | |
| 15 | Majimaji | 30 | 4 | 13 | 13 | 29 | 42 | −13 | 25 | Relegated |
| 16 | Njombe Mji | 30 | 4 | 10 | 16 | 17 | 43 | −26 | 22 | Relegated |

== See also ==
- 2017–18 Tanzania FA Cup
