= Abdulhalim Homoud Mohammed =

Tanzanian footballer

Personal information
- Date of birth: 12 March 1994 (age 32)
- Position: Midfielder

Team information
- Current team: Mtibwa Sugar

Senior career*
Years	Team	Apps	(Gls)
2007–2008	Ashanti United		
2008–2010	Mtibwa Sugar		
2010–2011	Simba		
2011–2013	Azam		
2013–2014	Simba		
2014	Sofapaka	1	(0)
2014–2016	Coastal Union		
2016–2017	Real Kings	0	(0)
2017	Malindi		
2018	KMC FC		
2018–2019	Arusha United		
2019–	Mtibwa Sugar		

International career^{‡}
2009–2010	Tanzania	5	(0)
2009–2011	Zanzibar	8	(1)
- * Club domestic league appearances and goals as of 1 August 2020 ‡ National team caps and goals as of 1 August 2020

Abdulhalim Humoud Mohamed (born 4 March 1994) is a Tanzanian football midfielder who plays for Namungo.
