= Hassan Dilunga =

Tanzanian footballer

Personal information
- Full name: Hassan Saleh Dilunga
- Date of birth: October 20, 1993 (age 33)
- Place of birth: Dar es Salaam, Tanzania
- Height: 1.70 m (5 ft 7 in)
- Position: Forward

Team information
- Current team: Simba
- Number: 34

Senior career*
Years	Team	Apps	(Gls)
2011–2013	Ruvu Shooting		
2013–2015	Young Africans		
2015–2016	Stand United		
2016–2017	JKT Ruvu Stars		
2017–2018	Mtibwa Sugar		
2018–	Simba		

International career^{‡}
2013–	Tanzania	20	(0)
- * Club domestic league appearances and goals as of 14 April 2021 ‡ National team caps and goals as of 14 April 2021

Hassan Dilunga (born 20 October 1993) is a Tanzanian footballer who plays as a forward for Simba and the Tanzania national football team.

== Career ==
Dilunga moved from Ruvu Shooting to Young Africans in 2013.

Dilunga transferred from Mtibwa Sugar to Simba Sports Club in 2018. Shortly after joining Simba, he scored the winning goal against his former side to win the Tanzanian Community Shield.

In 2019, Dilunga played in both legs of the Tanzania national team's playoff win against Burundi in the CAF first round of 2022 FIFA World Cup qualification.
