= Shaaban Hassan Kado =

Tanzanian footballer

Personal information
- Full name: Shaaban Hassan Shaaban Kado
- Date of birth: 14 April 1989 (age 37)
- Place of birth: Dar-es-Salaam, Tanzania
- Height: 1.68 m (5 ft 6 in)
- Position: Goalkeeper

Team information
- Current team: IHEFU FC

Senior career*
Years	Team	Apps	(Gls)
2008–2011	Mtibwa Sugar		
2011–2012	Young Africans		
2012–2013	Mtibwa Sugar		
2013–2015	Coastal Union		
2015–2017	Mwadui United		
2017–	Mtibwa Sugar		

International career^{‡}
2010–2011	Tanzania	8	(0)
- * Club domestic league appearances and goals as of 11 August 2021 ‡ National team caps and goals as of 11 August 2021

Shaaban Hassan Kado (born 14 April 1989) is a Tanzanian football goalkeeper who plays for Mtibwa Sugar.
