= Salum Kanoni =

Tanzanian footballer

Personal information
- Full name: Salum Kupela Kanoni
- Date of birth: 30 November 1988 (age 37)
- Place of birth: Kigoma, Tanzania
- Height: 1.66 m (5 ft 5 in)
- Position: Defender

Team information
- Current team: Mtibwa Sugar

Senior career*
| Years | Team | Apps | (Gls) |
| 2007–2012 | Simba | | |
| 2012–2016 | Kagera Sugar | | |
| 2017–2018 | Mwadui United | | |
| 2018– | Mtibwa Sugar | | |

International career^{‡}
| 2010 | Tanzania | 1 | (0) |
- * Club domestic league appearances and goals as of 11 August 2021 ‡ National team caps and goals as of 11 August 2021

Salum Kanoni (born 30 November 1988) is a Tanzanian football defender who plays for Mtibwa Sugar.
