= Charles Luhende =

Tanzanian footballer

Personal information
- Full name: David Charles Luhende
- Date of birth: 21 January 1989 (age 37)
- Place of birth: Kishapu, Tanzania
- Height: 1.65 m (5 ft 5 in)
- Position: Defender

Team information
- Current team: Kagera Sugar

Senior career*
Years	Team	Apps	(Gls)
2010–2012	Kagera Sugar		
2012–2014	Young Africans		
2014–2015	Mtibwa Sugar		
2015–2018	Mwadui United		
2018–	Kagera Sugar		

International career^{‡}
2013	Tanzania	2	(0)
- * Club domestic league appearances and goals as of 11 August 2021 ‡ National team caps and goals as of 11 August 2021

Charles Luhende (born 21 January 1989) is a Tanzanian football defender who plays for Kagera Sugar.
