= Saidi Ndemla =

Tanzanian footballer

Personal information
- Full name: Saidi Hamisi Juma
- Date of birth: 10 March 1996 (age 30)
- Place of birth: Dar es Salaam, Tanzania
- Height: 1.77 m (5 ft 10 in)
- Position: Midfielder

Team information
- Current team: Simba
- Number: 13

Senior career*
Years	Team	Apps	(Gls)
2013–	Simba		

International career^{‡}
2014–	Tanzania	17	(1)
- * Club domestic league appearances and goals ‡ National team caps and goals as of 17 November 2020.

Saidi Hamisi Juma (born 10 March 1996), known as Ndemla, is a Tanzanian footballer who plays as a midfielder for Premier League club Mtibwa Sugar on loan from Simba SC and the Tanzania national team.
