= Ahmed Arajiga =

Tanzania football referee (born 1992)

- Born: 3 July 1991 (age 35); Manyara, Tanzania

Domestic
Years	League	Role
2018–2019	First League	Referee
2018–19	Championship League	Referee
2019–	FA Cup	Referee
2019–	Premier League	Referee
2021–	FA Cup final	Referee

International
Years	League	Role
2022–	FIFA listed	Referee
2022–	CAF listed	Referee

Ahmed Arajiga (born 3 July 1991) is a Tanzanian association football referee. He has been on the FIFA International Referees List since 2022. He is one of the best referees in the country.

== Career ==
Ahmed Arajiga made his debut in the Tanzanian first division in 2018 and has been an international referee for FIFA since 2022.

=== Suspended by the TPLB ===
In 2022, Arajiga was banned for six months by the Tanzania Premier League Board for not properly enforcing the rules of football in the Azam 2–2 Yanga match.

=== Success ===
After a temporary suspension, he was one of the most reliable referees for many high-pressure or decisive matches.

== International ==
His first international match assignment was in 2022 when CAF appointed him to officiate the match between ASAS Djibouti Télécom and AS Kigali in the 2022–23 CAF preliminary rounds of the 2022–23 CAF Confederation Cup first leg.

In April 2023, CAF appointed him to officiate in the 2023 U-17 Africa Cup of Nations in Algeria.

In September 2024, he was appointed to officiate the match between Red Arrows and TP Mazembe in 2024–25 CAF Champions League qualifying rounds second leg.

In November 2023, FIFA appointed him to referee the 2026 World Cup qualifying match between Cameroon and Mauritius.

In October 2025, FIFA appointed him to referee the 2026 World Cup qualifying match between Cape Verde and Eswatini.
