= Simon Msuva =

Tanzanian footballer

Personal information
- Full name: Simon Happygod Msuva
- Date of birth: 2 October 1993 (age 33)
- Place of birth: Dar es Salaam, Tanzania
- Height: 1.75 m (5 ft 9 in)
- Position: Forward

Senior career*
| Years | Team | Apps | (Gls) |
| 2010–2011 | Azam FC | | |
| 2011–2012 | Moro United FC | | |
| 2012–2017 | Young Africans SC | | (31+) |
| 2017–2020 | Difaâ El Jadida | 80 | (28) |
| 2020–2021 | Wydad AC | 37 | (10) |
| 2022–2023 | Al-Qadsiah | 28 | (8) |
| 2023 | JS Kabylie | 6 | (0) |
| 2024 | Al-Najma | 15 | (4) |
| 2024–2026 | Al-Talaba SC | 62 | (21) |

International career^{‡}
| 2012– | Tanzania | 107 | (25) |
- * Club domestic league appearances and goals as of 31 December 2025 ‡ National team caps and goals as of 16:44, 17 November 2026 (UTC)

Simon Happygod Msuva (born 2 October 1993) is a Tanzanian professional footballer who plays as a forward for the Tanzania national team.

He is Tanzania national team joint top goalscorer with Mrisho Ngassa.

== Club career ==
On 28 August 2023, Msuva joined JS Kabylie. On 23 January 2024, Msuva joined Saudi club Al-Najma.

== International career ==
On 23 December 2025, Msuva made his 100th international appearance for Tanzania in 2–1 defeat against Nigeria during the 2025 Africa Cup of Nations. Four days later, he scored from the penalty spot in a 1–1 draw against Uganda, drawing level with Mrisho Ngasa on 25 goals as his country's joint all-time leading scorer.

== Career statistics ==
=== International ===
As of match played 17 November 2026

Appearances and goals by national team and year
| National team | Year | Apps | Goals |
|---|---|---|---|
| Tanzania | 2012 | 5 | 0 |
| Tanzania | 2013 | 3 | 0 |
| Tanzania | 2014 | 9 | 0 |
| Tanzania | 2015 | 13 | 2 |
| Tanzania | 2016 | 2 | 0 |
| Tanzania | 2017 | 14 | 6 |
| Tanzania | 2018 | 6 | 1 |
| Tanzania | 2019 | 10 | 4 |
| Tanzania | 2020 | 3 | 0 |
| Tanzania | 2021 | 8 | 4 |
| Tanzania | 2022 | 6 | 2 |
| Tanzania | 2023 | 8 | 2 |
| Tanzania | 2024 | 7 | 3 |
| Tanzania | 2025 | 8 | 1 |
| Tanzania | 2026 | 5 | 0 |
| Total | | 107 | 25 |

Scores and results list Tanzania's goal tally first.

List of international goals scored by Simon Msuva
| No. | Date | Venue | Opponent | Score | Result | Competition |
|---|---|---|---|---|---|---|
| 1. | 24 November 2015 | Awassa Kenema Stadium, Awasa, Ethiopia | Rwanda | 2–0 | 2–1 | 2015 CECAFA Cup |
| 2. | 28 November 2015 | Awassa Kenema Stadium, Awasa, Ethiopia | Ethiopia | 1–0 | 1–1 | 2015 CECAFA Cup |
| 3. | 28 March 2017 | National Stadium, Dar es Salaam, Tanzania | Burundi | 1–0 | 2–1 | Friendly |
| 4. | 29 June 2017 | Moruleng Stadium, Moruleng, South Africa | Mauritius | 1–1 | 1–1 | 2017 COSAFA Cup |
| 5. | 5 July 2017 | Moruleng Stadium, Moruleng, South Africa | Zambia | 2–4 | 2–4 | 2017 COSAFA Cup |
| 6. | 2 September 2017 | Uhuru Stadium, Dar es Salaam, Tanzania | Botswana | 1–0 | 2–0 | Friendly |
| 7. | 2 September 2017 | Uhuru Stadium, Dar es Salaam, Tanzania | Botswana | 2–0 | 2–0 | Friendly |
| 8. | 7 October 2017 | Uhuru Stadium, Dar es Salaam, Tanzania | Malawi | 1–1 | 1–1 | Friendly |
| 9. | 16 October 2018 | National Stadium, Dar es Salaam, Tanzania | Cape Verde | 1–0 | 2–0 | 2019 Africa Cup of Nations qualification |
| 10. | 24 March 2019 | National Stadium, Dar es Salaam, Tanzania | Uganda | 1–0 | 3–0 | 2019 Africa Cup of Nations qualification |
| 11. | 27 June 2019 | 30 June Stadium, Cairo, Egypt | Kenya | 1–0 | 2–3 | 2019 Africa Cup of Nations |
| 12. | 4 September 2019 | Prince Louis Rwagasore Stadium, Bujumbura, Burundi | Burundi | 1–1 | 1–1 | 2022 FIFA World Cup qualification |
| 13. | 15 November 2019 | National Stadium, Dar es Salaam, Tanzania | Equatorial Guinea | 1–1 | 2–1 | 2021 Africa Cup of Nations qualification |
| 14. | 28 March 2021 | National Stadium, Dar es Salaam, Tanzania | Libya | 1–0 | 1–0 | 2021 Africa Cup of Nations qualification |
| 15. | 2 September 2021 | Stade TP Mazembe, Lubumbashi, Democratic Republic of the Congo | DR Congo | 1–1 | 1–1 | 2022 FIFA World Cup qualification |
| 16. | 10 October 2021 | Stade de l'Amitié, Cotonou, Benin | Benin | 1–0 | 1–0 | 2022 FIFA World Cup qualification |
| 17. | 14 November 2021 | Mahamasina Municipal Stadium, Antananarivo, Madagascar | Madagascar | 1–0 | 1–1 | 2022 FIFA World Cup qualification |
| 18. | 23 March 2022 | National Stadium, Dar es Salaam, Tanzania | Sudan | 1–1 | 1–1 | Friendly |
| 19. | 24 September 2022 | Martyrs of February Stadium, Benina, Libya | Uganda | 1–0 | 1–0 | Friendly |
| 20. | 24 March 2023 | Suez Canal Stadium, Ismailia, Egypt | Uganda | 1–0 | 1–0 | 2023 Africa Cup of Nations qualification |
| 21. | 18 June 2023 | National Stadium, Dar es Salaam, Tanzania | Niger | 1–0 | 1–0 | 2023 Africa Cup of Nations qualification |
| 22. | 21 January 2024 | Laurent Pokou Stadium, San-Pédro, Ivory Coast | Zambia | 1–0 | 1–1 | 2023 Africa Cup of Nations |
| 23. | 16 November 2024 | Stade des Martyrs, Kinshasa, DR Congo | Ethiopia | 1–0 | 2–0 | 2025 Africa Cup of Nations qualification |
| 24. | 19 November 2024 | Benjamin Mkapa Stadium, Dar es Salaam, Tanzania | Guinea | 1–0 | 1–0 | 2025 Africa Cup of Nations qualification |
| 25. | 27 December 2025 | Al Medina Stadium, Rabat, Morocco | Uganda | 1–0 | 1–1 | 2025 Africa Cup of Nations |

== Honours ==
Young Africans SC

- Tanzanian Premier League: 2012–13, 2014–15, 2015–16, 2016–17
- Tanzania FA Cup: 2016
- Community Shield: 2013, 2014, 2015
- Community Shield runner-up: 2016, 2017

DH El Jadida

- Moroccan Throne Cup runner-up: 2017

Wydad AC

- Botola: 2020–21

== See also ==
- List of men's footballers with 100 or more international caps
