= Amissi =

Amissi is both a Burundian masculine given name and surname. Notable people with the name include:

== Given name ==
- Amissi Tambwe (born 1988), Burundian footballer

== Surname ==
- Cédric Amissi (born 1990), Burundian footballer
- Mohamed Amissi (born 2000), Burundian footballer
