= 2016–17 Premier League (disambiguation) =

2016–17 Premier League may refer to a number of professional sports league seasons:

Basketball

- 2016–17 Icelandic Premier League
- 2016–17 Irish Premier League season

Association football

- 2016–17 Armenian Premier League
- 2016–17 Azerbaijan Premier League
- 2016–17 Premier League of Belize
- 2016–17 Premier League of Bosnia and Herzegovina
- 2016–17 Egyptian Premier League
- 2016–17 Premier League (England)
  - 2016–17 Premier League International Cup
- 2016–17 Hong Kong Premier League
- 2016–17 Iraqi Premier League
- 2016–17 Israeli Premier League
- 2016–17 Kuwaiti Premier League
- 2016–17 Lebanese Premier League
- 2016–17 Maltese Premier League
- 2016–17 National Premier League (Jamaica)
- 2016–17 Premier Soccer League (South Africa)
- 2016–17 Russian Premier League
- 2016–17 Syrian Premier League
- 2016–17 Tanzanian Premier League
- 2016–17 Ukrainian Premier League
- 2016–17 Welsh Premier League

Cricket

- 2016–17 Bangladesh Premier League
- 2016–17 Premier League Tournament (Sri Lanka)
