= Nickson Kibabage =

Tanzanian footballer

Personal information
- Full name: Nickson Clement Kibabage
- Date of birth: 12 October 1997 (age 29)
- Place of birth: Tanzania,
- Position: Left-back

Team information
- Current team: Simba Sports Club
- Number: 30

Senior career*
Years	Team	Apps	(Gls)
2018–2019	Mtibwa Sugar		
2019–2021	Difaâ El Jadidi	0	(0)
2020	→ KMC FC (loan)	0	(0)
2022–2023	Singida Black Stars		
2023–	Young Africans	12	(0)

International career^{‡}
2021–	Tanzania	14	(0)
- * Club domestic league appearances and goals as of 17:17, 26 March 2021 (UTC) ‡ National team caps and goals as of 23:15, 10 September 2022 (UTC)

Nickson Clement Kibabage (born 12 October 2000) is a Tanzanian professional footballer who plays as a Full-back for the Tanzania premier league club Young Africans S.C. and the Tanzania national team.

== Career statistics ==
=== International ===
As of matches played 26 March 2021.

National team	Year	Apps	Goals
Tanzania	2021	1	0
Total		1	0
