= 2017–18 Tanzania FA Cup =

Tournament details
- Country: Tanzania

Final positions
- Champions: Mtibwa Sugar

The 2017–18 Tanzania FA Cup (also called the Azam Sports Federation Cup) is the 3rd edition of the Tanzania FA Cup, the knockout football competition of Tanzania.

The tournament began with the first round on 31 October 2017.

In the final on 2 June 2018, Mtibwa Sugar defeated Singida United.

== See also ==
- 2017–18 Tanzanian Premier League
