= Dickson Daudi =

Tanzanian footballer

Personal information
- Full name: Dickson Daudi MBeikya
- Date of birth: 10 April 1986 (age 40)
- Position: Defender

Team information
- Current team: Mtibwa Sugar

Senior career*
Years	Team	Apps	(Gls)
2005–	Mtibwa Sugar		

International career^{‡}
2006	Tanzania	4	(0)
- * Club domestic league appearances and goals as of 14 April 2021 ‡ National team caps and goals as of 14 April 2021

Dickson Daudi (born 10 April 1986) is a Tanzanian football defender who plays for Mtibwa Sugar.
