= 2017–18 Premier League (disambiguation) =

The 2017–18 Premier League was a professional association football league season in England.

2017–18 Premier League may also refer to:

== Association football ==
- 2017–18 Armenian Premier League
- 2017–18 Azerbaijan Premier League
- 2017–18 Premier League of Belize
- 2017–18 Premier League of Bosnia and Herzegovina
- 2017–18 Egyptian Premier League
- 2017–18 Hong Kong Premier League
- 2017–18 Iraqi Premier League
- 2017–18 Israeli Premier League
- 2017–18 Kuwaiti Premier League
- 2017–18 Lebanese Premier League
- 2017–18 Maltese Premier League
- 2017–18 National Premier League (Jamaica)
- 2017–18 Russian Premier League
- 2017–18 Syrian Premier League
- 2017–18 Tanzanian Premier League
- 2017–18 Ukrainian Premier League
- 2017–18 Welsh Premier League

== Basketball ==
- 2017–18 Icelandic Premier League
- 2017–18 Irish Premier League season, a 2018 basketball season

== Cricket ==
- 2017 Bangladesh Premier League
- 2017 Indian Premier League
- 2017–18 Premier League Tournament (Sri Lanka)

== See also ==
- 2017–18 Premier League International Cup
