= Mseto Sports =

- Full name: Mseto Sports
- Ground: Morogoro, Tanzania
- League: Tanzanian Second Division

Mseto Sports is a Tanzanian football club based in Morogoro in east Tanzania. It is one of the three biggest football clubs in Morogoro.

In 1975 Mseto Sports won the Tanzanian Premier League.

== Honours ==
- Tanzanian Premier League: 1

1975

== See also ==
- Tanzanian Premier League
