= Kaitaba Stadium =

Sports venue in Bukoba, Tanzania

- Bukoba Mjini Stadium
- Interactive map of Kaitaba Stadium
- Full name: Kaitaba Stadium Bukoba
- Location: Jamhuri Road near Lake Victoria Bukoba, Tanzania
- Coordinates: 1°20′4″S 31°49′2″E
- Capacity: About 5,000

Tenant
- Kagera Sugar

Kaitaba Stadium is a multi-use stadium in Bukoba, Tanzania. It is currently used mostly for football matches, on club level by Kagera Sugar of the Tanzanian Premier League and occasionally host the country's famous Simba FC vs Yanga Fc. The stadium has a capacity of about 5,000 spectators.It can also be booked/rented for private sessions when not in use, but needs special permission from the Office of the Head of State.
