= Metacha Mnata =

Tanzanian footballer

Metacha Punga Mnata
Personal information
- Full name: Metacha Boniphace Mnata
- Date of birth: 25 November 1998 (age 27)
- Place of birth: Dodoma, Tanzania
- Position: Goalkeeper

Team information
- Current team: Young Africans
- Number: 1

Senior career*
Years	Team	Apps	(Gls)
2017–2018	Azam		(0)
2018–2019	Mbao		
2019–2021	Young Africans		
2021–	PoliceTZ		

International career^{‡}
2019–	Tanzania	9	(0)
- * Club domestic league appearances and goals ‡ National team caps and goals as of 23:10, 10 September 2022 (UTC)

Metacha Boniphace Mnata (born 25 November 1998) is a Tanzanian professional footballer who plays as a goalkeeper for Tanzanian Premier League club Young Africans and the Tanzania national team.

== International ==
He was selected for Tanzania squad for the 2019 Africa Cup of Nations and made his debut in the last group game against Algeria on 1 July 2019.
