= Tanzania Premier League Board =

Governing body of football in Tanzania

- Abbreviation: TPLB
- Formation: 2012; 14 years ago
- Type: Sports organisation
- Headquarters: Dar es Salaam, Tanzania
- Region served: Tanzania
- Official language: Kiswahili, English
- Chairman: Steven Mnguto
- CEO: Almasi Kasongo
- Secretary General-TFF: Kibao Wilfred
- Parent organization: TFF
- Website: ligikuu.co.tz

Tanzania Premier League Board (TPLB) is the governing body mandated to run the sport of football in Tanzania. The board has been assigned the authority to run and manage the Tanzanian Premier League, Championship and First League under Article 55 of the TFF Constitution.

== History ==
The Tanzania Premier League Board (TPLB) is a body established by the Tanzania Football Federation (TFF) with the approval of its general meeting held on 24 to 25 March 2012. It is also a union of all clubs in Tanzania, which elects leaders to lead it.

TPLB has the right to govern itself and administer laws and regulations without interference from any other body.

== Staff ==
Type	Name
Chairman	Steven Mnguto
Vice-Chairman	Nassor Idrissa
CEO	Almasi Kasongo
Secretary General -TFF	Kibao Winfred
Members	Kheri Misinga
Members	Hillary Ndumbaro
Members	Japhet Makau
Members	Salim Abdallah
Members	Azimkhan Akber
Members	Shiraz Batchu
Members	Shani Christoms
