= Amissi Tambwe =

Burundian footballer (born 1988)

Personal information
- Full name: Amissi Jocelyn Tambwe
- Date of birth: 10 October 1988 (age 38)
- Place of birth: Bujumbura, Burundi
- Height: 1.70 m (5 ft 7 in)
- Position: Forward

Team information
- Current team: Singida Big Stars

Senior career*
| Years | Team | Apps | (Gls) |
| 2008–2009 | Aigle Noir | | |
| 2010–2013 | Vital'O | | |
| 2013–2014 | Simba | | |
| 2014–2019 | Young Africans | | |
| 2019–2021 | Fanja | | |
| 2021- | kombo fc | | |

International career^{‡}
| 2011– | Burundi | 26 | (6) |
- * Club domestic league appearances and goals as of 1 August 2020 ‡ National team caps and goals as of 1 August 2020

Amissi Tambwe (born 10 October 1988) is a Burundian football striker who plays for Singida Big Stars.

Appearances and goals by national team and year
| National team | Year | Apps | Goals |
|---|---|---|---|
| Burundi | 2011 | 3 | 1 |
| Burundi | 2012 | 3 | 0 |
| Burundi | 2013 | 3 | 1 |
| Burundi | 2014 | 6 | 1 |
| Burundi | 2015 | 5 | 1 |
| Burundi | 2016 | 2 | 0 |
| Burundi | 2020 | 4 | 2 |
| Total | | 26 | 6 |

Scores and results list Burundi's goal tally first, score column indicates score after each Tambwe goal.

List of international goals scored by Amissi Tambwe
| No. | Date | Venue | Opponent | Score | Result | Competition | Ref. |
|---|---|---|---|---|---|---|---|
| 1 | 8 January 2011 | Cairo Military Academy Stadium, Cairo, Egypt | Tanzania | 1-0 | 1-1 | Friendly | |
| 2 | 7 July 2013 | Intwari Stadium, Bujumbura, Burundi | Sudan | 1-0 | 1-1 | 2014 African Nations Championship qualification | |
| 3 | 26 April 2014 | Benjamin Mkapa Stadium, Dar es Salaam, Tanzania | Tanzania | 2-0 | 3-0 | Friendly | |
| 4 | 25 November 2015 | Hawassa Kenema Stadium, Hawassa, Ethiopia | Kenya | 1-0 | 1-1 | 2015 CECAFA Cup | |
| 5 | 18 January 2020 | Bangabandhu National Stadium, Dhaka, Bangladesh | Seychelles | 2-1 | 3-1 | Friendly | |
| 6 | 18 January 2020 | Bangabandhu National Stadium, Dhaka, Bangladesh | Seychelles | 3-1 | 3-1 | Friendly | |
