= Lake Tanganyika Stadium =

Stadium in Kigoma-Ujiji District of Kigoma Region, Tanzania

- Uwanja wa Ziwa Tanganyika (Swahili)
- Location in Tanzania
- Location: Kigoma-Ujiji District, Kigoma, Tanzania
- Coordinates: 4.902019°S 29.661891°E
- Owner: Chama Cha Mapinduzi
- Capacity: 20,000
- Type: Multi-purpose stadium

Tenant
- Reli F.C.

Lake Tanganyika Stadium is a multi-purpose stadium by Lake Tanganyika in Kigoma-Ujiji District, Kigoma, Tanzania. It is used mostly for football matches. The stadium holds 20,000.
