= Dodoma Jiji FC =

- Founded: 2019 as Dodoma Jiji FC
- Ground: Jamhuri Stadium (Dodoma)
- Capacity: 30,000
- Owner: The City Council of Dodoma
- League: Tanzanian Premier League
- 2025–26: 9th of 16

Dodoma Jiji Football Club is a Tanzanian football club based in Dodoma City. The club won promotion to the Tanzanian Premier League for the 2020–21 season. They drew an average home attendance of 2,025 in the 2023–24 Tanzanian Premier League.
