= Saidi Ntibazonkiza =

Burundian footballer

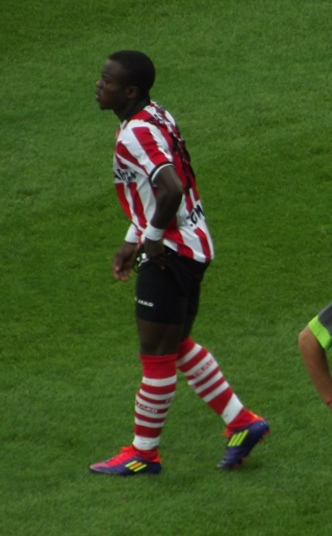

Personal information
- Full name: Saidi Ntibazonkiza
- Date of birth: 1 May 1987 (age 39)
- Place of birth: Bujumbura, Burundi
- Height: 1.70 m (5 ft 7 in)
- Position: Winger

Team information
- Current team: Vital'O
- Number: 10

Youth career
- Vital'O

Senior career*
Years	Team	Apps	(Gls)
2003–	Vital'O	78	(52)
2006–2010	NEC	63	(10)
2010–2014	Cracovia	85	(17)
2014–2015	Akhisar Belediyespor	13	(1)
2015–2016	Caen	14	(1)
2015	Caen B	4	(1)
2017	Kaysar Kyzylorda	10	(2)
2020–2022	Young Africans	31	(11)
2022	Geita Gold	12	(4)
2022–2024	Simba	37	(24)

International career
2004–2024	Burundi	39	(13)
Medal record
Men's football
Representing Burundi
CECAFA Cup
Runner-up	2004 Ethiopia
- * Club domestic league appearances and goals

Saidi Ntibazonkiza Likati (born 1 May 1987) is a Burundian professional footballer who plays as a winger for Vital'O and the Burundi national team.

== Career ==
=== Club ===
Ntibazonkiza started to play football at Vital'O. As an asylum seeker, he came to the Netherlands in 2005. NEC was the nearest professional football club, and because of that, he trained with their youth team. Eventually, NEC signed him on a permanent deal. At the beginning of the 2006–07 season, he began playing for the youth team, but was shortly thereafter promoted to the first-team squad. On 18 November 2006, against Sparta Rotterdam, Ntibazonkiza played his first game in the Eredivisie. After receiving a Dutch residence permit, Ntibazonkiza signed a contract binding him to NEC until the summer of 2009. He also signed another contract extension until 2012 in January 2009.

On 10 February 2017, Ntibazonkiza signed for Kazakhstan Premier League club Kaysar Kyzylorda.

After being released by Kaysar Kyzylorda, Ntibazonkiza returned to his first club, Burundian side Vital'O.

=== International career ===
Ntibazonkiza played for several Burundian youth teams, and for his national squad.

== Career statistics ==
=== Club ===
Club	Season	League			National Cup		League Cup		Continental		Other		Total	
Club	Season	Division	Apps	Goals	Apps	Goals	Apps	Goals	Apps	Goals	Apps	Goals	Apps	Goals
Vital'O	2003-2005	Burundi Primus League	67	44									67	44
Vital'O	2025-26	Burundi Primus League	7	7	1	1							8	8
Vital'O	2026-27	Burundi Primus League	4	1									4	1
Vital'O	Total		78	52	1	1							79	53
NEC	2006–07	Eredivisie	7	0			–		–		–		7	0
NEC	2007–08	Eredivisie	6	0			–		–		–		6	0
NEC	2008–09	Eredivisie	28	5			–		–		–		28	5
NEC	2009–10	Eredivisie	22	5	2	0	–		–		–		24	5
NEC	Total		63	10	2	0	–		–		–		65	10
Cracovia	2010–11	Ekstraklasa	27	5	2	0	–		–		–		29	5
Cracovia	2011–12	Ekstraklasa	21	3	0	0	–		–		–		21	3
Cracovia	2012–13	I liga	5	0	0	0	–		–		–		5	0
Cracovia	2013–14	Ekstraklasa	29	8	1	0	–		–		–		30	8
Cracovia	Total		85	17	3	0	–		–		–		88	17
Akhisar Belediyespor	2014–15	Süper Lig	13	1	3	1	–		–		–		16	2
Caen	2015–16	Ligue 1	14	1	0	0	0	0	–		–		14	1
Caen II	2015–16	Championnat de France Amateur 2	4	1	0	0	0	0	–		–		4	1
Kaisar	2017	Kazakhstan Premier League	10	2	0	0	–		–		–		10	2
Young Africans	2020-21	Tanzanian Premier League	13	4									13	4
Young Africans	2021-22	Tanzanian Premier League	18	7									18	7
Young Africans	Total		31	11									31	11
Geita Gold	2022-23	Tanzanian Premier League	12	4									12	4
Simba	2022-23	Tanzanian Premier League	11	13	1	0			7	0			19	13
Simba	2023-24	Tanzanian Premier League	26	11					9	2			35	13
Simba	Total		37	24	1	0			16	2			54	26
Career total			347	123	10	2	0	0	16	2	0	0	373	127

=== International ===
Burundi
Year	Apps	Goals
2004	6	2
2010	1	0
2011	6	1
2012	2	0
2014	3	2
2015	1	2
2020	3	4
2021	4	2
2022	2	0
2023	3	0
2024	5	0
2026	2	0
Total	38	13

==== International goals ====
As of 13 November 2021.

No.	Date	Venue	Opponent	Score	Result	Competition
1.	13 December 2004	Addis Ababa Stadium, Addis Ababa, Ethiopia	Rwanda	2–0	3–1	2004 CECAFA Cup
2.	22 December 2004	Addis Ababa Stadium, Addis Ababa, Ethiopia	Sudan	1–0	2–1	2004 CECAFA Cup
3.	5 June 2011	Prince Louis Rwagasore Stadium, Bujumbura, Burundi	Rwanda	2–1	3–1	2012 Africa Cup of Nations qualification
4.	5 March 2014	Prince Louis Rwagasore Stadium, Bujumbura, Burundi	Rwanda	1–1	1–1	Friendly
5.	7 September 2014	Prince Louis Rwagasore Stadium, Bujumbura, Burundi	Tanzania	1–0	2–0	Friendly
6.	25 March 2015	Stade George V, Curepipe, Mauritius	Mauritius	1–1	2–2	Friendly
7.	25 March 2015	Stade George V, Curepipe, Mauritius	Mauritius	2–2	2–2	Friendly
8.	11 October 2020	National Stadium, Dar es Salaam, Tanzania	Tanzania	1–0	1–0	Friendly
9.	11 November 2020	Stade Cheikha Ould Boïdiya, Nouakchott, Mauritania	Mauritania	1–1	1–1	2021 Africa Cup of Nations qualification
10.	15 November 2020	Intwari Stadium, Bujumbura, Burundi	Mauritania	1–0	3–1	2021 Africa Cup of Nations qualification
11.	15 November 2020	Intwari Stadium, Bujumbura, Burundi	Mauritania	3–1	3–1	2021 Africa Cup of Nations qualification
12.	26 March 2021	Intwari Stadium, Bujumbura, Burundi	Central African Republic	1–2	2–2	2021 Africa Cup of Nations qualification
13.	13 November 2021	Arslan Zeki Demirci Sports Complex, Manavgat, Turkey	Myanmar	2–1	2–1	Friendly

== Honours ==
Burundi

- CECAFA Cup: Runner-up, 2004
