= Uhuru Stadium =

Stadium in Dar es Salaam, Tanzania

- Uwanja wa Uhuru (Swahili)
- Location of Uhuru Stadium
- Former names: Tanzania National Stadium
- Address: Taifa Road
- Location: Miburani, Dar es Salaam, Tanzania
- Coordinates: 6.855675°S 39.272671°E
- Owner: Tanzanian government
- Capacity: 23,000
- Type: Stadium
- Surface: Artificial turf
- Public transit: Kurasini Station (4 km)

Construction
- Built: 1961

Tenants
- Young Africans S.C., Simba S.C., JKT Ruvu Stars, Ruvu Shooting Stars

Website
- www.habari.go.tz

Uhuru Stadium (formerly known as the Tanzania National Stadium) (Uwanja wa Uhuru in Swahili) is adjacent to the National Stadium in Miburani ward of Temeke District in Dar es Salaam, Tanzania.

== History ==
Tanganyika's independence ceremony was celebrated at this stadium on 9 December 1961. The independence anniversary has been celebrated at the stadium each year since then. It also has been the venue for the inaugural address of all past presidents.

The funeral service of Julius Nyerere, Tanzania's first president, was held at the stadium on 21 October 1999. Shortly after his death in office, president John Magufuli was laid-in-state at the stadium on 20 March 2021. Forty-five people were killed in a stampede at the stadium on March 21, 2021.
