= Sokoine Stadium =

Sports venue in Tanzania

The Sokoine Stadium
- Interactive map of The Sokoine Stadium
- Coordinates: 8°53′40.5″S 33°26′47.9″E

Sokoine Stadium is a multi-use stadium in the Sisimba ward of Mbeya, Tanzania, owned by the Chama Cha Mapinduzi (CCM) political party.

It is used mostly for football matches. It is one of Tanzania Mainland Premier League venue, serves as the home venue for Prisons FC and Mbeya City F.C. It holds 20,000 people.

Originally named the Mapinduzi Stadium, it was re-named Sokoine Memorial Stadium in 1984, after the death of Edward Sokoine, the Prime Minister of the Republic of Tanzania.
