= Fountain Gate F.C =

Tanzanian football club

Fountain Gate
- Full name: Fountain Gate Football Club
- Founded: 2010; 16 years ago
- Ground: Kwaraa Stadium
- Head coach: Robert Matano
- League: Tanzanian Premier League
- 2025–26: Tanzanian Premier League, 12th of 16

Fountain Gate Football Club is a professional football club based in Manyara Region, Tanzania. The club competes in the NBC Premier League, the top division in the Tanzania Football League. They were founded as Diamond Trust Bank Football Club in 2010, changed their name to Singida Fountain Gate FC in 2023 and later to Fountain Gate FC in 2024.

== History ==
Fountain Gate FC was founded in 2010 as a team of DTB Bank employees known as Diamond Trust Bank Football Club (DTB FC) before changing their name. DTB FC later gained popularity after performing well in bank bonanzas throughout the country, prompting the bank's leadership to invest in the team officially and advocate for it to compete in the First Division League (Championship). In 2022, DTB Bank discontinued their ownership of the football team in order to focus on its core banking functions after the club gained promotion to the Premier League. This gave stakeholders in the Singida Region the opportunity to purchase the team and change its name from DTB FC to Singida Big Stars similar to Singida United.

In 2022–23 season, the Singida Big Stars Club began playing in the Tanzanian Premier League. The team performed well by recruiting high-quality international players as well as players from major Tanzanian clubs such as Simba, Yanga, Azam, Mtibwa, Mbeya City, and others. The Singida Big Stars club's success is built on the calibre of its players, technical bench, and strong leadership. The club placed fourth (4th) in their debut season and qualified for the 2023–24 CAF Confederation Cup.

After a successful 2022–23 season, ahead of the 2023–24 season, Singida Big Stars Club investor Fountain Gate Academy showed interest in purchasing the club with the intention of improving and modernising it. Following the acquisition, Singida Big Stars merged with Fountain Gate Academy to become the new name of Singida Fountain Gate FC.

Singida Fountain Gate FC drew an average home attendance of 1,410 in the 2023–24 Tanzanian Premier League.

== Grounds ==
Whilst the team was DTB, it was using the Uhuru stadium in Dar es Salaam as its home stadium. After the team was moved to the Singida region they moved their home grounds to the Liti Stadium which used to be called (Namfua), same stadium that was used by Singida United.

== Management ==
Muhibu Kanu served the club's Chief Executive Officer during its first top flight season and prior to its sale and change of name to Singida Fountain Gate FC. On 14 June 2023, Singida Fountain Gate FC appointed former Botswana Football Association (BFA) head of competitions and operations, Olebile Sikwane as its chief executive.

The club's main sponsor is SportPesa.

== Honours ==
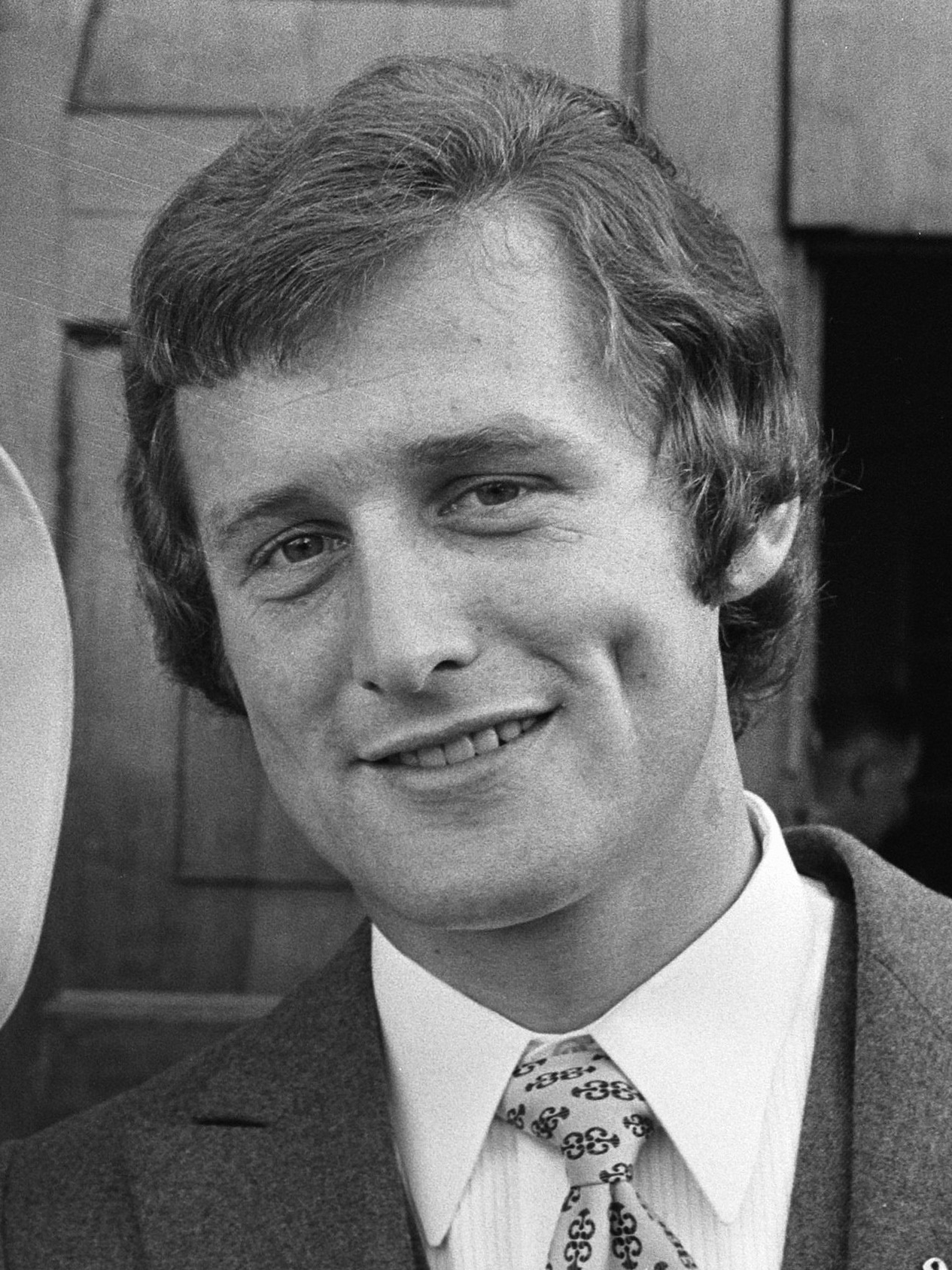
Hans van der Pluijm became the manager of the club in 2022

=== Domestic ===
League

- Second Division / Championship (level 2)
  - Runners-up: 2021–22

== Coaches ==
- (Netherlands) Hans van der Pluijm (26 May 2022 - 4 September 2023)
- (Germany) Ernst Middendorp (4 September 2023 – 18 September 2023)
