= Kambarage Stadium =

Coordinates: 3.661651008°S 33.41553288°E

Kambarage Stadium is a multi-use stadium in Shinyanga, Tanzania. It is currently used mostly for football matches and serves as the home venue for Kahama United. It currently holds 30,000 people.
