= Stand United F.C. =

- Founded: 2012
- Ground: Kambarage Stadium
- Capacity: 10,000
- League: Tanzanian Championship League
- 2024–25: Tanzanian Championship League, 3rd of 16

Stand United F.C. is a professional football club based in the city of Shinyanga, Shinyanga Region, Tanzania. They compete in the Tanzanian Championship League.

Home games are being played at Kambarage Stadium in Shinyanga, which is an all-seater stadium.
