= Ruvu Shooting F.C. =

Tanzanian football club

Ruvu Shooting Stars
- Full name: Ruvu Shooting Stars Football Club
- Ground: Uhuru Stadium; Dar es Salaam, Tanzania
- Capacity: 23,000
- League: Tanzanian Premier League
- 2022-23: 16th

Ruvu Shooting Stars is a football club based in Dar es Salaam, Tanzania. They play at the Uhuru Stadium in the Tanzanian Premier League.

They primarily wear blue with yellow trim kits.
