= Namungo FC =

- Full name: Namungo Football Club
- Nickname: Wauaji wa Kusini (The Southern Killers)
- Founded: 2019
- Ground: Majaliwa Stadium
- Capacity: 4,000
- Manager: Juma Mgunda
- League: Tanzanian Premier League
- 2025–26: 10th of 16

Namungo Football Club is a Tanzanian professional football club based in Lindi, Tanzania. The club competes in the Tanzanian Premier League. The club plays home games at Majaliwa Stadium. They drew an average home attendance of 946 in the 2023–24 Tanzanian Premier League.
