= Coastal Union F.C. =

Tanzanian football club

Coastal Union FC
- Full name: Coastal Union Football Club
- Nicknames: Wagosi wa Kaya, Mangushi
- Founded: 1948; 78 years ago
- Ground: Mkwakwani Stadium; Tanga, Tanzania
- Capacity: 15,000
- Chairman: Steven Mguto
- Manager: David Ouma
- League: Tanzanian Premier League
- 2025–26: Tanzanian Premier League, 8th of 16
Home colours	Away colours

Coastal Union F.C. is a Tanzanian professional football club based in Tanga. The club competes in the Tanzanian Premier League. Their home games are played at Mkwakwani Stadium. Coastal Union FC drew an average home attendance of 1,610 in the 2023–24 Tanzanian Premier League.

== Achievements ==
- Tanzanian Premier League Champions (1 title)
  - 1988; 38 years ago
- Nyerere Cup (2 titles)
  - 1980; 46 years ago
  - 1988; 38 years ago

== Performance in CAF competitions ==
- CAF Cup Winners' Cup: 1 appearance

1981 – withdrew in First Round
1989 – First Round

•CAF Confederation Cup:1 appearance

2024-Preliminary Round
