= Tanzanian Premier League =

Association football league

- Founded: 1921; 105 years ago (as "Dar es Salaam Football League"); 1965; 61 years ago (as "National League")
- Country: United Republic of Tanzania
- Confederation: Tanzania Premier League Board
- Number of clubs: 16
- Level on pyramid: 1
- Relegation to: Championship
- Domestic cup(s): CRDB Bank Federation Cup FA Community Shield Mapinduzi Cup Muungano Cup
- International cups: CAF Champions League; CAF Confederation Cup
- Current champions: Young Africans (2025–26)
- Most championships: Young Africans (27 titles)
- Top scorer: John Bocco (155 goals)
- Broadcaster(s): Azam TV (live matches and highlights)
- Website: ligikuu.co.tz
- Current: 2025–26 Tanzanian Premier League

The Tanzania Mainland Premier League (Swahili: Ligi Kuu Tanzania Bara) is a top-level Tanzanian professional football league, governed by the TPLB.

== History ==
The league was first organized in Dar es Salaam in 1921 and by 1929 had six participants. In the 1930s, the league included street teams such as Arab Sports (Kariakoo) and New Strong Team (Kisutu), which primarily consisted of Arab and African players. The Sudanese community had a team that joined the league in 1941 although by the mid-1940s the team had split up. Other teams in the league's early history included the Khalsas, an exclusively Sikh team, and the Ilala Staff, a team of Ilalan residents.

In 1942, clubs from public institutions such as the Government School, Post Office, Railways SC, King's African Rifles SC, Police SC, and the Medical Department started to dominate the league. However, most teams disbanded in the aftermath of World War II, with many European players ceasing their participation in the league and their clubs. This included Gymkhana Club, Police Club, King's African Rifles, and Railways, who eventually withdrew from the league. Starting in the 1940s, they were replaced by African street teams such as Young Africans (Yanga) and Sunderland (known as Old Boys in 1942 and later renamed Simba in 1971), as well as the Goan's Club manned by Goans, and the Agha Khan Club by Ismaili Khojas.

From this period onwards, Yanga and Sunderland gradually became the most prominent clubs in Dar es Salaam. Yanga, founded in 1935, entered the first division and won four major cups in 1942. Sunderland joined the first division soon after Yanga and won four major trophies in 1946.

By 1955, the Dar es Salaam League had 38 registered clubs. It became the "National League" by 1965, incorporating most of the major teams in Tanzania. The name was later changed to the "First Division Soccer League" and later to the "Premier League" in 1997. Tanzania Breweries became the sponsor of the championship, after which the league was called the Tanzania Breweries League (TBL). The contract with Breweries was terminated in 2001 after a conflict with the Tanzania Football Association. In 2002, a contract was signed with the telecommunication company Vodacom, which lasted until 2009, after which they were renewed the same year.

== Competition format ==
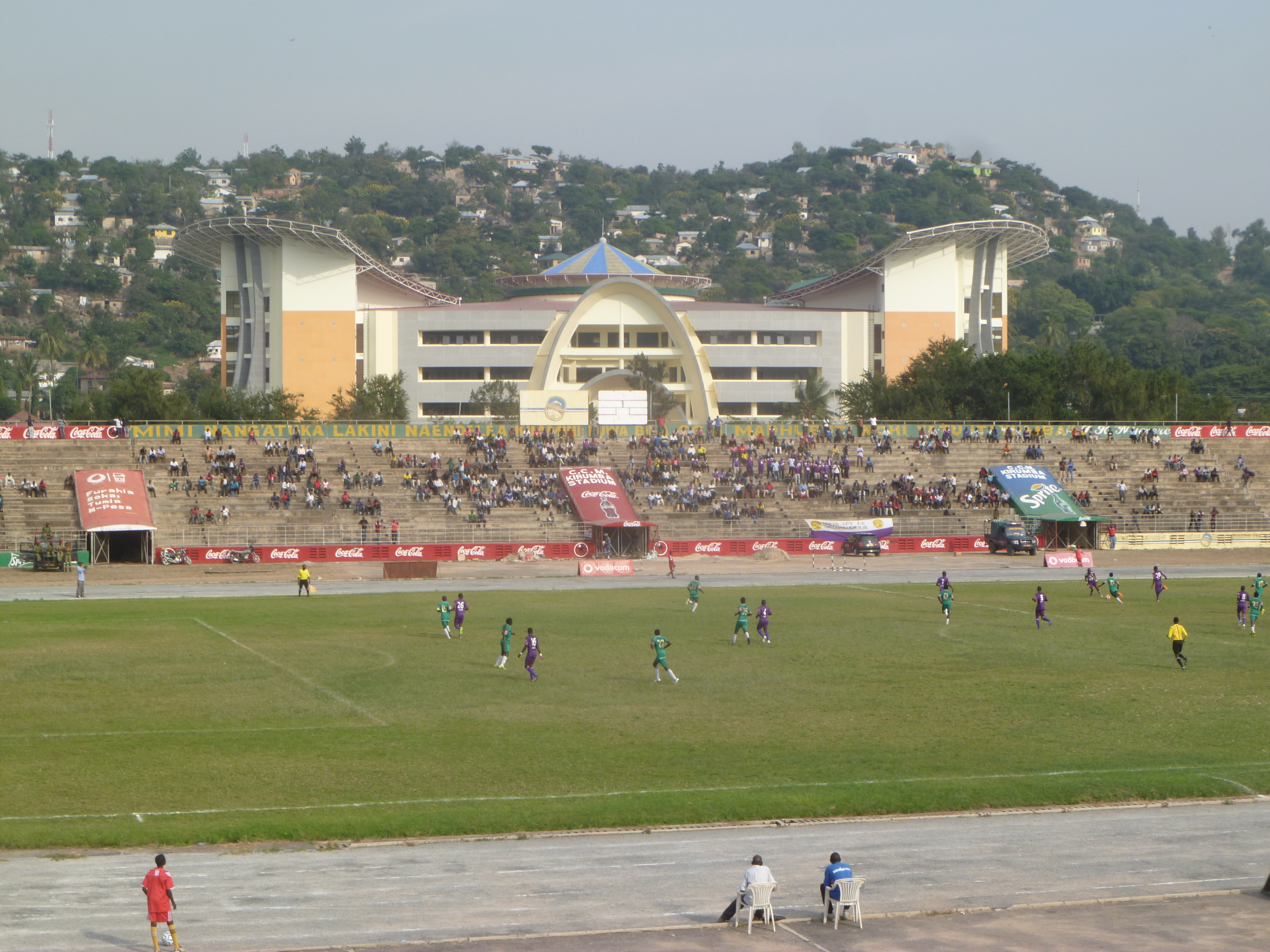
Tanzanian Premier League match between Kagera Sugar and Mbeya City on 17 January 2015

=== Competition ===
The Tanzanian Premier League (TPL) follows a typical double round-robin format with each team playing the other twice, home and away. Each win earns three points, a draw earns a point for both teams, and a loss earns zero points.

=== Promotion & Relegation ===
The bottom two-placed teams are automatically demoted to the Championship and are replaced by the winners and runners-up from the championship. The third and fourth worst-ranked teams enter a play-off with the 3rd and 4th placed teams from the First Division.

== International Competitions ==
Confederation of African Football (CAF) teams based in Tanzania compete in the CAF Champions League and CAF Confederation Cup.

Recent positive performances by TPL clubs in continental competitions have seen Tanzania rise in the CAF 5-year ranking. As a result, more teams from the league have had the opportunity to compete on the continental stage.

=== CAF Champions League ===
The league champion qualifies for the CAF Champions League for the following season.

Starting in the 2021–22 season, the second-placed team from the previous season also qualifies for the CAF CL.

=== CAF Confederation Cup ===
Since the 2015–16 season, the winner of the Tanzania FA Cup has qualified for the CAF Confederations Cup. This qualification place had previously been awarded only to the runner-up in the Premier League.

From the 2021–22 season onwards, the champions of the FA Cup and the third-placed team in the Premier League have also qualified for the tournament.

=== Club ranking for the 2024–25 CAF club season ===
The club ranking for the 2024–25 CAF Champions League and the 2024–25 CAF Confederation Cup is be based on results from each CAF club competition from the 2019–20 to the 2023–24 seasons.

Rank	Club	2019–20 (× 1)	2020–21 (× 2)	2021–22 (× 3)	2022–23 (× 4)	2023–24 (× 5)	Total
1	(Egypt) Al Ahly	6	6	5	6	6	87
2	(Tunisia) Espérance de Tunis	3	4	3	4	5	61
3	(Morocco) Wydad	4	4	6	5	2	60
4	(South Africa) Mamelodi Sundowns	3	3	3	4	4	54
5	(Egypt) Zamalek	5	2	2	2	5	48
6	(Morocco) RS Berkane	5	1	5	0	4	42
7	(Tanzania) Simba	0	3	2	3	3	39
8	(Angola) Petro de Luanda	2	1	4	2	3	39
9	(Democratic Republic of the Congo) TP Mazembe	3	2	3	0.5	4	38
10	(Algeria) CR Belouizdad	0	3	3	3	2	37
11	(Algeria) USM Alger	1	0	0	5	3	36
12	(Morocco) Raja CA	4	5	3	3	0	35
13	(Tanzania) Young Africans S.C.	0	0	0	4	3	31
14	(Ivory Coast) ASEC Mimosas	0	0	1	3	3	30
15	(Egypt) Pyramids	4	3	2	2	1	29

=== Club ranking for the 2025–26 CAF club season ===
The club ranking for the 2025–26 CAF Champions League and the 2025–26 CAF Confederation Cup is be based on results from each CAF club competition from the 2020–21 to the 2024–25 seasons.

Rank	Club	2020–21 (× 1)	2021–22 (× 2)	2022–23 (× 3)	2023–24 (× 4)	2024–25 (× 5)	Total
1	(Egypt) Al Ahly	6	5	6	6	4	78
2	(South Africa) Mamelodi Sundowns	3	3	4	4	5	62
3	(Tunisia) Espérance de Tunis	4	3	4	5	3	57
4	(Morocco) RS Berkane	1	5	0	4	5	52
5	(Tanzania) Simba	3	2	3	3	4	48
6	(Egypt) Pyramids	3	2	2	1	6	47
7	(Egypt) Zamalek	2	2	2	5	2	42
8	(Morocco) Wydad AC	4	6	5	2	0	39
9	(Algeria) USM Alger	0	0	5	3	2	37
10	(Algeria) CR Belouizdad	3	3	3	2	2	36
11	(Sudan) Al-Hilal	1	2	2	2	3	34
12	(Tanzania) Young Africans	0	0	4	3	2	34
13	(Ivory Coast) ASEC Mimosas	0	1	3	3	2	33
14	(Democratic Republic of the Congo) TP Mazembe	2	3	0.5	4	1	30.5
15	(South Africa) Orlando Pirates	2	4	0	0	4	30

== Qualification for CAF competitions ==
=== Association ranking for the 2024–25 CAF club season ===
The association ranking for the 2024–25 CAF Champions League and the 2024–25 CAF Confederation Cup is based on results from each CAF club competition from 2019–20 to the 2023–24 season.

Legend

- CL: CAF Champions League
- CC: CAF Confederation Cup
- ≥: Associations points might increase on basis of its clubs performance in 2023–24 CAF club competitions
- Associations ranked 1–12 are eligible to enter two teams in each CAF club competition.

Rank			Association	2019–20 (× 1)		2020–21 (× 2)		2021–22 (× 3)		2022–23 (× 4)		2023–24 (× 5)		Total
2024	2023	Mvt	Association	CL	CC	CL	CC	CL	CC	CL	CC	CL	CC	Total
1	2	+1	Egypt	11	6	8	3	7	4	8	2.5	7	7	184
2	1	-1	Morocco	8	8	4	6	9	5	8	2	2	4	148
3	3	—	Algeria	3	1	6	5	7	1	6	5	2	3	119
4	4	—	South Africa	3	0.5	8	2	5	4	4	3	4	1.5	106
5	5	—	Tunisia	6	0	4	3	5	1	4	2	6	1	97
6	6	—	Tanzania	0	0	3	0.5	0	2	3	4	6	0	71
7	7	—	DR Congo	4	1	4	0	0	3	1	2	4	0	54
8	8	—	Angola	4	0	1	0	5	0	2	0	3	1.5	51.5
9	9	—	Sudan	2	0	3	0	3	0	3	0	2	0	39
10	11	+1	Libya	0	2	0	0.5	0	5	0	0.5	0	3	35
11	13	+2	Ivory Coast	0	0.5	0	0	0	1	0	3	3	0	30.5
12	12	—	Nigeria	0	3	0	2	0	0	0	2	0	2	25

=== Association ranking for the 2025–26 CAF club season ===
The association ranking for the 2025–26 CAF Champions League and the 2025–26 CAF Confederation Cup will be based on results from each CAF club competition from 2020–21 to the 2024–25 season.

Legend

- CL: CAF Champions League
- CC: CAF Confederation Cup
- ≥: Associations points might increase on basis of its clubs performance in 2024–25 CAF club competitions
- Associations ranked 1–12 are eligible to enter two teams in each CAF club competition.

Rank			Association	2020–21 (× 1)		2021–22 (× 2)		2022–23 (× 3)		2023–24 (× 4)		2024–25 (× 5)		Total
2025	2024	Mvt	Association	CL	CC	CL	CC	CL	CC	CL	CC	CL	CC	Total
1	1	—	Egypt	8	3	7	4	8	2.5	7	7	10	4	190.5
2	2	—	Morocco	4	6	9	5	8	2	2	4	5	5	142
3	4	+1	South Africa	8	2	5	4	4	3	4	1.5	9	3	131
4	3	-1	Algeria	6	5	7	1	6	5	2	3	5	5	130
5	6	+1	Tanzania	3	0.5	0	2	3	4	6	0	2	4	82.5
6	5	-1	Tunisia	4	3	5	1	4	2	6	1	3	0.5	82.5
7	8	+1	Angola	1	0	5	0	2	0	3	1.5	2	2	55
8	7	-1	DR Congo	4	0	0	3	1	2	4	0	2	0	45
9	9	—	Sudan	3	0	3	0	3	0	2	0	3	0	41
10	11	+1	Ivory Coast	0	0	0	1	0	3	3	0	1	2	38
11	10	-1	Libya	0	0.5	0	5	0	0.5	0	3	0	0	24
12	12	—	Nigeria	0	2	0	0	0	2	0	2	0	1	21

== Clubs ==
Starting from the 2018–19 season, the league was composed of 20 teams, which was further lowered to 18 in 2020 and then 16 in 2021.

=== 2023–24 season clubs ===
Location of clubs in Tanzania for the 2023–24 Tanzanian Premier League season

== Champions ==
=== Wins by year ===
Previous champions are:

Years	Champions
1965	Sunderland
1966	Sunderland
1967	Cosmopolitans (1)
1968	Young Africans
1969	Young Africans
1970	Young Africans
1971	Young Africans
1972	Young Africans
1973	Simba
1974	Young Africans
1975	Mseto Sports (1)
1976	Simba
1977	Simba
1978	Simba
1979	Simba
1980	Simba
1981	Young Africans
1982	Pan African (1)
1983	Young Africans
1984	KMKM FC (1)
1985	Tukuyu Stars(1)
1986	Tukuyu Stars(1)
1987	Young Africans
1988	African Sports (1)
1989	Malindi
1990	Pamba (1)
1991	Young Africans
1992	Malindi (2)
1993	Simba
1994	Simba
1995	Simba
1996	Young Africans
1997	Young Africans
1998	Maji Maji (3)
1999	Prisons (1)
2000	Young Africans
2001	Simba
2002	Simba
2003	Not awarded
2004	Simba
2005	Young Africans
2006	Young Africans
2007	Simba
2007–08	Young Africans
2008–09	Young Africans
2009–10	Simba
2010–11	Young Africans
2011–12	Simba
2012–13	Young Africans
2013–14	Azam (1)
2014–15	Young Africans
2015–16	Young Africans
2016–17	Young Africans
2017–18	Simba
2018–19	Simba
2019–20	Simba
2020–21	Simba
2021–22	Young Africans (27)
2022–23	Young Africans (27)
2023–24	Young Africans (27)
2024–25	Young Africans (27)
2025–26	Young Africans (27)

=== Titles by team ===
Club	Wins
Young Africans	27
Simba (includes Sunderland)	21
Maji Maji	3
Malindi	2
African Sports	1
Pan African	1
Azam	1
Cosmopolitans	1
Mseto Sports	1
Pamba	1
KMKM	1

== Top goalscorers ==
Season	Nat.	Best scorers	Team	Goals
1997	(Tanzania)	Mohamed Hussein "Mmachinga"	Young Africans	26
2004	(Tanzania)	Abubakar Ally Mkangwa	Mtibwa Sugar	
2005	(Tanzania)	Abdallah Juma	Mtibwa Sugar	25
2006		n/a	n/a	
2007	(Tanzania)	Mashiku	SC United	17
2007–08	(Tanzania)	Michael Katende	Kagera Sugar	
2008–09	(Kenya)	Boniface Ambani	Young Africans	18
2009–10	(Tanzania)	Musa Hassan Mgosi	Simba	18
2010–11	(Tanzania)	Mrisho Ngasa	Azam	18
2011–12	(Tanzania)	John Raphael Bocco	Azam	19
2012–13	(Ivory Coast)	Kipre Tchetche	Azam	17
2013–14	(Burundi)	Amissi Tambwe	Simba	19
2014–15	(Tanzania)	Simon Msuva	Young Africans	17
2014–15	(Tanzania)	Abdulrahman Mussa	Ruvu Shooting	17
2015–16	(Burundi)	Amissi Tambwe	Young Africans	21
2016–17	(Tanzania)	Simon Msuva	Young Africans	14
2017–18	(Uganda)	Emmanuel Okwi	Simba	20
2018–19	(Rwanda)	Meddie Kagere	Simba	23
2019–20	(Rwanda)	Meddie Kagere	Simba	22
2020–21	(Tanzania)	John Bocco	Simba	16
2021–22	(Tanzania)	George Mpole	Geita Gold	17
2022–23	(Democratic Republic of the Congo)	Fiston Mayele	Young Africans	17
2022–23	(Burundi)	Saidi Ntibazonkiza	Simba	17
2023–24	(Burkina Faso)	Stephane Aziz Ki	Young Africans	21
2024–25	(Ivory Coast)	Jean Charles Ahoua	Simba	16

=== All-time goalscorers ===
Rank	Player	Goals	Years
1	(Tanzania) John Bocco	155	2008–2025
2	(Uganda) Emmanuel Okwi	97	2009–2019

== Assists ==
Season	Nat.	Player	Team	Assists
2021–22	(Senegal)	Pape Sakho	Simba	6
2022–23	(Zambia)	Clatous Chama	Simba	14
2023–24	(Ivory Coast)	Kipre Junior	Azam	9
2024–25	(Tanzania)	Feisal Salum	Azam	13

== Clean sheets ==
Season	Nat.	Goalskeeper	Team	Clean sheets
2022–23	(Mali)	Djigui Diarra	Yanga	14
2023–24	(Democratic Republic of the Congo)	Ley Matampi	Coastal Union	15
2024–25	(Guinea)	Moussa Camara	Simba	19
