= Mbeya City F.C. =

Tanzanian association football club based in Mbeya

Mbeya City Council FC
- Full name: Mbeya City Council Football Club
- Nickname: Purple Nation
- Founded: August 25, 2011
- Ground: Sokoine Stadium
- Capacity: 20,000
- Owner: Mbeya City Council
- League: Tanzanian Premier League
- 2025–26: 14th of 16

Mbeya City Council Football Club, is a Tanzanian football team playing in the Tanzanian Premier League. The team was established in 2011 in Mbeya City which is in the Southern Highlands of southwest Tanzania. Mbeya City FC is known by the names of Green City Boys, Purple Tigers and Jacaranda Warriors. Their home jersey is purple and white. The 20,000 capacity Sokoine Stadium is their home stadium.
