= Tanzania Prisons S.C =

Association football club in Tanzania

Tanzania Prisons F.C
- Full name: Tanzania Prisons Sports Club
- Nickname: Wajela jela
- Founded: 1988; 38 years ago
- Ground: Sokoine Stadium; Mbeya, Tanzania
- Capacity: 20,000
- Owner: Tanzania Prisons Service
- Chairman: Chacha Bina
- Manager: Amani Richad Josia
- League: Tanzanian Premier League
- 2025–26: Tanzanian Premier League, 13th of 16
Home colours

Tanzania Prisons S.C is a Tanzanian professional football club based in Mbeya. The club competes in Tanzanian Premier League. Their home games are played at Sokoine Stadium.

In February 2026, the club announced the termination of the contract of coach Zedeckia Evans Otieno after mutual agreement.

== Achievements ==
- Muungano Cup Champions (1 title)
  - 1999; 27 years ago
