= Kagera Sugar F.C. =

Tanzanian association football club based in Bukoba

Kagera Sugar
- Full name: Kagera Sugar Football Club
- Ground: Kaitaba Stadium; Bukoba, Tanzania
- Capacity: 5,000
- League: Tanzanian Championship League
- 2024–25: Tanzanian Premier League, 15th of 16 (relegated)

Kagera Sugar is a Tanzanian professional football club based in Bukoba, Tanzania. The club competes in Tanzanian Premier League. Kagera Sugar use the Kaitaba Stadium for home games. They drew an average home attendance of 821 in the 2023–24 Tanzanian Premier League.
