= Simba S.C. =

Association football club in Tanzania

Simba
- Full name: Simba Sports Club
- Nicknames: Reds of Msimbazi, Wekundu wa Msimbazi (The Red Lions)
- Short name: SSC
- Founded: 1936; 90 years ago
- Ground: Benjamin Mkapa Stadium
- Capacity: 60,000
- Owner(s): Member of SSC 51% Mohammed Dewji 49%
- Chairman: Murtaza Mangungu
- Head Coach: Steve Barker
- League: Tanzanian Premier League
- 2025–26: Tanzanian Premier League, 2nd of 16
- Website: www.simbasc.co.tz
Home colours	Away colours	Third colours

Simba Sports Club is a professional football club based in Kariakoo ward in Ilala District of Dar es Salaam in Tanzania.

It was founded in 1936 as "The Queens" before being renamed to Sunderland and, in 1971, was finally renamed Simba (Swahili for "Lion"). The team's nickname, wekundu wa msimbazi ("the Red Lions"), is a reference to their all-red home strip and Msimbazi Street in Kariakoo where their headquarters is based.

Simba SC has won 22 Tanzanian Premier League titles, 5 Tanzania FA Cup and has participated in CAF Champions League multiple times. Simba are two times finalists of CAF Confederation Cup, In the year 2025 and previous CAF cup in 1993 making the club the most successful Tanzanian football club in international competitions.

The club was ranked among the top 20 clubs in Africa, at number 04, by the International Federation of Football History & Statistics (IFFHS) in their May 1, 2024 – April 30, 2025 rankings. Globally, the club was ranked at number 105 in the IFFHS World Ranking.

Simba holds a long-standing rivalry with Young Africans S.C. (known as Yanga) with which they contest the Kariakoo derby, named after the ward, where both teams were founded. In 1977 Simba beat Yanga 6–0 a record that stands to date as the biggest loss margin between the sides. The rivalry was ranked 5th as one of the most famous African derbies. It remains one of the best derbies on the African continent.

== Honours ==
=== Domestic ===
- Tanzanian Premier League
  - Winner (22): 1965, (Note: As Sunderland) 1966, 1973, 1976, 1977, 1978, 1979, 1980, 1993, 1994, 1995, 2001, 2002, 2003, 2004, 2007, 2009–10, 2011–12, 2017–18, 2018–19, 2019–20, 2020–21
- Nyerere Cup
  - Winner (3): 1984, 1995, 2000
- FAT Cup
  - Winner (5): 1995, 2016–17, 2019–20, 2020–2021, 2025–26
  - Runners-up (3): 1974, 1998, 2000
- Muungano Cup
  - Winner (1): 2025–26
- Dar es Salaam League
  - Winner (2): 1944, 1946
- Tusker Cup
  - Winner (5): 2001, 2002, 2003, 2005, 2005
  - Runners-up (1): 2006
- Community Shield
  - Winner (10): 2002, 2003, 2005, 2011, 2012, 2017, 2018, 2019, 2020, 2023
  - Runners-up (3): 2001, 2010, 2021
- Mapinduzi Cup
  - Winner (3): 2011, 2015, 2022
  - Runners-up (5): 2014, 2017, 2019, 2020, 2021

=== Continental ===
- CECAFA Club Championship
  - Winners (6): 1974, 1991, 1992, 1995, 1996, 2002
  - Runners-up (7): 1975, 1952, 1978, 1981, 2003, 2011, 2018
- CAF Cup
  - Runners-up (1): 1993

CAF Confederation Cup

- Runners-up (1): 2024–25

== Colours and badge ==
The present crest

== Players ==
=== Current squad ===
As of 26 July 2026

Note: Flags indicate national team as defined under FIFA eligibility rules; some limited exceptions apply. Players may hold more than one non-FIFA nationality.

No.	Pos.	Nation	Player
3	DF	TAN	Nickson Kibabage
4	DF	TAN	Vedastus Masinde
5	DF	TAN	Antony Mligo
10	FW	CGO	Inno Loemba
12	DF	TAN	Shomari Kapombe (Captain)
14	DF	TAN	Abdulrazack Hamza
15	DF	TAN	David Kameta
17	FW	KEN	Mohammed Bajaber
18	MF	TAN	Morice Abraham
21	MF	TAN	Yusuph Kagoma
22	GK	TAN	Yakoub Suleiman Ali
23	DF	RSA	Rushine De Reuck (vice-captain)

No.	Pos.	Nation	Player
24	FW	ZAM	Clatous Chama
26	DF	TAN	Nathaniel Chilambo
28	GK	TAN	Hussein Abel
29	FW	SEN	Libasse Gueye
31	DF	TAN	Wilson Nangu
34	FW	COD	Elie Mpanzu
36	DF	TAN	Ladaki Chasambi
37	MF	TAN	Hussein Semfuko
39	GK	NIG	Djibrilla Kassali
-	MF	RSA	Keletso Makgalwa
-	MF	NGR	Ibraheem Jabaar
-	MF	TAN	Kelvin Nashon

== Performance in CAF competitions ==
CAF Champions League: 14 appearances

- 2002 – First Round
- 2003 – Group stage (Top 8)
- 2004 – Preliminary Round
- 2005 – First Round
- 2008 – First Round
- 2011 – Special play-off for Group stage
- 2013 – Preliminary Round
- 2018–19 – Quarter-finals
- 2019–20 – Preliminary Round
- 2020–21 – Quarter-finals
- 2021–22 – Second Round
- 2022–23 – Quarter-finals
- 2023–24 – Quarter-finals
- 2025–26 – Group stage

African Cup of Champions Clubs: 9 appearances

- 1974 – Semi-finals
- 1976 – Second Round
- 1977 – Second Round
- 1978 – Second Round
- 1979 – Second Round
- 1980 – Second Round
- 1981 – First Round
- 1994 – Quarter-Finals
- 1995 – Second Round

CAF Confederation Cup: 6 appearances

- 2007 – Preliminary Round
- 2010 – Second Round
- 2011 – Play-off
- 2012 – Second Round
- 2018 – First Round
- 2021–22 – Quarter-finals
- 2024–25 – Runners-up

CAF Cup: 2 appearances

- 1993 – Finalist
- 1997 – First Round

== Club Ranking ==
=== World ===
As of 3 September 2023

Ranking	Team	Points
113	(France) AS Monaco	623
114	(England) Leicester City FC	622
115	(Tanzania) Simba SC	622
116	(Italy) ACF Fiorentina	621
117	(Peru) Sporting Cristal	620

=== CAF ===
As of 3 September 2023

Ranking	Team	Points
8	(Algeria) CR Belouizdad	724
9	(Morocco) RS Berkane	631
10	(Tanzania) Simba SC	622
11	(Democratic Republic of the Congo) TP Mazembe	603
12	(Tunisia) ES Sahel	585

=== Domestic ===
As of 3 September 2023

Ranking	Team	Points
1	(Tanzania) Simba SC	621
2	(Tanzania) Young Africans	521
3	(Tanzania) Azam FC	278
4	(Tanzania) Namungo FC	166
5	(Tanzania) KMC FC	150

== Kit Sponsorship ==
Period	Kit manufacturer	Shirt sponsor (chest)	Shirt sponsor (sleeve)	Shirt sponsor (back)
2025–	Diadora SA	Betway Tanzania	Jay Rutty	Mo Dewji
