= Mtibwa Sugar F.C. =

- Full name: Mtibwa Sugar Football Club
- Nickname: Wana tam tam
- Founded: 1988; 38 years ago
- Ground: Manungu Stadium
- Capacity: 5,000
- Manager: Yusuf Chipo
- League: Tanzanian Premier League
- 2025–26: 15th of 16
Home colours

Mtibwa Sugar Football Club is a Tanzanian football club based in Turiani in northern Mvomero District. Their home games are played at Manungu Stadium they also use other stadiums such as CCM Jamhuri and Gairo as their home stadium. Mtibwa Sugar FC drew an average home attendance of 501 in the 2023–24 Tanzanian Premier League.

== History ==
Mtibwa Sugar Sports Club was founded in 1988 by a group of workers of Mtibwa Sugar Estates Ltd. who decided to form a football team that would take part in league competitions at district level. The team started playing in the 4th division in 1989 and was promoted to the first division in 1996. In 1998, the league was restructured and became the Premier League.

== Achievements ==
- Tanzanian Premier League Champions (2 titles)
  - 1999; 27 years ago
  - 2000; 26 years ago
- Tanzanian Championship League Champions (1 title).
  - 2025; 1 year ago
- Nyerere Cup (1 title)
  - 2018; 8 years ago

== Performance in CAF competitions ==
- CAF Confederation Cup: 1 appearance

2004 – First Round

- CAF Cup: 3 appearances

2000 – Second Round
2001 – First Round
2002 – Second Round
