= List of football clubs in Tanzania =

The following is an incomplete list of association football clubs based in Tanzania.

== Tanzania mainland ==
At the moment Tanzania mainland hosts 89 football clubs.

=== A ===
1. Abajalo F.C. (Dar es Salaam)
2. Abajalo S.C. (Tabora)
3. African Lyon F.C. (Dar es Salaam)
4. African Sports (Tanga)
5. African Wanderers (Iringa)
6. Albino United F.C. (Dar es Salaam)
7. Alliance Schools F.C. (Mwanza)
8. Area C United F.C. (Dodoma)
9. Arusha F.C. (Arusha)
10. Ashanti United S.C. (Dar es Salaam)
11. Azam F.C. (Dar es Salaam)

=== B ===
1. Bandari F.C. (Mtwara)
2. Biashara United F.C. (formerly Polisi Mara F.C.) (Musoma)
3. Boma F.C. (Mbeya)
4. Bukinafaso F.C. (alternate spellings: Burkina Faso, Burkinafaso, Bukina Faso) (Morogoro)
5. Buseresere F.C. (Geita)

=== C ===
1. Changanyikeni F.C. (Dar es Salaam)
2. Coastal Union F.C. (Tanga)
3. Cosmopolitans F.C. (Dar es Salaam)

=== D ===
1. Dodoma F.C. (formerly Polisi Dodoma) (Dodoma)
2. Dodoma Jiji FC (Dodoma)
3. Dodoma Sport F.C. (Dodoma)

=== E ===
1. Eleven Stars F.C. (Bukoba)

=== F ===
1. Forodhani F.C. (Musoma)
2. Friends Rangers F.C. (Dar es Salaam)

=== G ===
1. Geita Gold FC (Geita)
2. Green F.C. (Songwe Region)
3. Green Warriors F.C. (Dar es Salaam)

=== I ===
1. Ihefu F.C. (Mbeya)

=== J ===
1. JKT Kanembwa (Kigoma)
2. JKT Mgambo F.C. (Tanga)
3. JKT Mlale F.C. (Songea)
4. JKT Oljoro F.C. (Arusha)
5. JKT Ruvu Stars F.C. (Dodoma)
6. JKT Rwamkoma F.C. (Musoma)

=== K ===
1. Kagera Sugar F.C. (Bukoba)
2. Kahama United (Shinyanga)
3. Kariakoo F.C. (Lindi)
4. Kilimanjaro Heroes F.C. (formerly Panone F.C.) (Moshi)
5. Kiluvya United F.C. (Pwani)
6. Kimondo Super F.C. (Mbeya)
7. Kisarawe United F.C.
8. Kinondoni Municipal Council F.C. (formerly Tessema F.C.) (Dar es Salaam)
9. Kitayosce F.C. (Moshi)

=== L ===
1. Lipuli F.C. (Iringa)

=== M ===
1. Madini S.C. (Arusha)
2. Maji Maji F.C. (Songea)
3. Manyema F.C. (Dar es Salaam)
4. Mashujaa F.C. (Kigoma)
5. Mawenzi Market F.C. (Morogoro)
6. Mbao F.C. (Mwanza)
7. Mbeya City F.C. (Mbeya)
8. Mbeya Kwanza F.C. (Mbeya)
9. Mbeya Warriors F.C. (Mbeya)
10. Mighty Elephant F.C. (Songea)
11. Mirambo S.C. (Tabora)
12. Mji Mkuu (CDA) F.C. (Dodoma)
13. Mkamba F.C. (Morogoro)
14. Moro United F.C. (Morogoro)
15. Msange JKT F.C. (Tabora)
16. Mseto Sports (Morogoro)
17. Mshikamano F.C. (Dar es Salaam)
18. Mtibwa Sugar F.C. (Turiani)
19. Mufindi United F.C. (formerly Kurugenzi F.C.) (Iringa)
20. Mvuvumwa F.C. (Kigoma)
21. Mwadui F.C. (Shinyanga)
22. Mzingani Warriors F.C (Tanga)

=== N ===
1. Namungo F.C. (Lindi)
2. Ndanda F.C. (Mtwara)
3. Njombe Mji F.C. (Njombe)
4. Nyanza F.C. (Mererani)

=== P ===
1. Pamba S.C. (Mwanza)
2. Pan African S.C. (Dar es Salaam)
3. Polisi Dar F.C. (Dar es Salaam)
4. Polisi Tabora F.C. (Tabora)

=== R ===
1. Reha F.C. (Dar es Salaam)
2. Rhino Rangers F.C. (Tabora)
3. Ruvu Shooting (Dar es Salaam)

=== S ===
1. Sabasaba F.C. (Morogoro)
2. Sahare All Stars F.C. (TANGA)
3. Silabu F.C. (Mtwara)
4. Simba S.C. (Dar es Salaam)
5. Singida United F.C. (Singida)
6. Stand United F.C. (Shinyanga)

=== T ===
1. Tanzania Polisi F.C. (formerly Polisi Morogoro) (Moshi)
2. Tanzania Prisons F.C. (Mbeya)
3. Tanzebras FC (Dar es Salaam)
4. Toto African S.C (Mwanza)
5. Transit Camp F.C. (Shinyanga)

=== U ===
1. Usamala F.C. (Bariadi)

=== V ===
1. Villa Squad F.C. (Dar es Salaam)

=== W ===
1. Wenda F.C. (Mbeya)

=== Y ===
1. Young Africans S.C., also known as "Yanga" (Dar es Salaam)

== Zanzibar ==
At the moment Zanzibar hosts 25 football clubs.

=== B ===
1. Black Sailors F.C. (ZPL 2017–18)

=== C ===
1. Charawe F.C. (ZPL 2017–18)
2. Chipukizi F.C.
3. Chuoni F.C. (ZPL 2017–18) (Unguja Island)

=== H ===
1. Hard Rock S.C. (Kangani)

=== J ===
1. Jamhuri F.C. (Wete, Pemba Island, Zanzibar)
2. Jang'ombe Boys F.C. (ZPL 2017–18) (Zanzibar City, Unguja Island)
3. JKU S.C., also known as Jeshi la Kujenga Uchumi S.C. (ZPL 2017–18)

=== K ===
1. Kilimani City F.C. (ZPL 2017–18) (Zanzibar City, Unguja Island)
2. Kilimani Star F.C. (Zanzibar City, Unguja Island)
3. Kipanga F.C. (ZPL 2017–18)
4. KMKM F.C., also known as the Kikosi Maalum cha Kuzuia Magendo F.C. (ZPL 2017–18) (Unguja Island)
5. KVZ S.C., also known as the Kikosi cha Valantia Zanzibar S.C. (ZPL 2017–18)

=== M ===
1. Mafunzo F.C. (ZPL 2017–18)
2. Malindi F.C.
3. Miembeni S.C. (Zanzibar City, Unguja Island)
4. Miembeni City S.C. (ZPL 2017–18) (Zanzibar City, Unguja Island)
5. Mundu S.C. (Nungwi)
6. Mwenge S.C. (Wete, Pemba Island)

=== P ===
1. Polisi S.C. (ZPL 2017–18)

=== S ===
1. Shaba S.C. (Kojani, Kojani Island)
2. Shangani F.C. (Zanzibar City, Unguja Island)
3. Small Simba F.C.

=== T ===
1. Taifa ya Jang'ombe S.C. (ZPL 2017–18) (Mpendae)

=== Z ===
1. Zanzibar Ocean View F.C.
2. Zimamoto F.C. (ZPL 2017–18)
