= List of football stadiums in Tanzania =

This is a list of football (soccer) stadiums in Tanzania, ranked in descending order of capacity with at least 5,000 spectators. Some stadiums are football-specific and some are used for other purposes.

== Current stadiums ==
#	Image	Stadium	Capacity	City	Home team(s)
1		National Stadium Tanzania	60,000	Dar es Salaam	National team, Simba SC, Young Africans FC
2		CCM Kirumba Stadium	35,000	Mwanza	Mbao FC, Alliance Schools FC, Pamba F.C., Toto African
3		Kambarage Stadium	30,000	Shinyanga	Kahama United
4		Jamhuri Stadium Dodoma	30,000	Dodoma	JKT Ruvu Stars
5		Gombani Stadium	30,000	Chake-Chake	
6		Maji-Maji Stadium	30,000	Songea	
7		Jamhuri Stadium Morogoro	20,000	Morogoro	Moro United F.C.
8		Nelson Mandela Stadium	20,000	Sumbawanga	
9		Uhuru Stadium	23,000	Dar es Salaam	Young Africans S.C., Simba S.C., JKT Ruvu Stars, Ruvu Shooting
10		Sheikh Amri Abeid Memorial Stadium	20,000	Arusha	Arusha F.C., JKT Oljoro FC
11		Lake Tanganyika Stadium	20,000	Kigoma	Reli F.C.
12		Ali Hassan Mwinyi Stadium	20,000	Tabora	Rhino Rangers
13		Sokoine Stadium	20,000	Mbeya	Prisons FC, Mbeya City
14		Amaan Stadium	15,000	Unguja	Unguja KMKM FC, Miembeni S.C., Mlandege S.C.
15		Mkwakwani Stadium	15,000	Tanga	Coastal Union F.C., African Sports, JKT Mgambo
16		Chamazi Stadium	10,000	Dar es Salaam	Azam F.C.
17		Manungu Stadium	5,000	Turiani	
18		Kaitaba Stadium	5,000	Bukoba	

== See also ==
- List of African stadiums by capacity
- List of association football stadiums by capacity
- List of association football stadiums by country
- Lists of stadiums
