= Tanzanian Championship League =

Association football league

Tanzania Championship
- Organising body: Tanzania Premier League Board
- Founded: 1965; 61 years ago
- Country: Tanzania
- Number of clubs: 16
- Level on pyramid: 2
- Promotion to: Tanzanian Premier League
- Relegation to: First League
- Domestic cup: CRDB Bank Federation Cup
- International cup: CAF Confederation Cup via CRDB Bank Federation Cup
- Current champions: Mtibwa Sugar (2024–25)
- Broadcaster(s): TV3 Tanzania (live matches and highlights)
- Website: Official website
- Current: 2025–26 Championship

The Tanzanian Championship League (known as the NBC Championship League for sponsorship reasons) is the second-highest football league in Tanzania. It is made up of sixteen teams that play thirty rounds, home and away. The league was formed in 1930.

The top two teams at the end of the season get promoted to the Tanzanian Premier League, while the third and fourth go into a playoff with two last-placed teams not eligible for automatic relegation. The last two teams are relegated to the first division, while the last four go into a playoff. The two winners in the playoffs are retained, while the two losing teams are relegated to the First League.

== 2025–26 Tanzanian Championship League ==
- Geita Gold
- Kagera
- Kitayosce
- Mashujaa FC
- JKT
- Pamba Mwanza
- Biashara United Mara
- A.S.C.
- Transit Camp
- Kengold
- Pan African
- Mbeya Kwanza
- Copco
- Gwambina
- Green Warriors
- Songea United

== 2022–23 Tanzanian Championship League ==
- Mbuni
- Fountain Gate
- Kitayosce
- Mashujaa FC
- JKT
- Pamba Mwanza
- Biashara United Mara
- A.S.C.
- Transit Camp
- Kengold
- Pan African
- Mbeya Kwanza
- Copco
- Gwambina
- Green Warriors
- Ndanda

== Fixtures/results ==
Home \ Away	MBU	FGA	KIT	MAS	JKT	PAM	BIA	ASC	GRW	TCA	KEN	PAF	MKW	GWA	NDA	CVE
Mbuni			0–1		0–1		1–0		3–0						3–0	1–0
Fountain Gate	2–1						1–0		2–0	1–0					1–0	1–0
Kitayosce		3–0				3–0				2–0	3–1	1–1	2–0	4–0		
Mashujaa FC		3–1	0–0		2–1	0–2				1–1	2–1	2–1	1–0			
JKT Tanzania		1–0	3–1			1–0	1–0	1–0	0–0							2–0
Pamba Mwanza	1–0							2–1	3–2	2–0	1–0	1–0	1–3		1–1	
Biashara		2–1	2–0	0–0		2–1			5–0				0–1	1–0		1–1
African Sports Club	2–0			2–1			0–1		1–1						1–1	1–0
Green Warriors			1–2	0–1									0–1	2–1	0–0	0–1
Transit Camp F.C.	0–3				0–4		2–1	3–1						1–0		3–3
Kengold	4–0	0–1			1–0			1–0		3–1		5–0		1–2		
Pan African S.C.	0–4	2–1			0–1		2–0	1–1		1–1			1–3	3–1		
Mbeya	1–0	1–3			0–1			2–1		1–0	2–3				2–0	
Gwambina				2–1		1–2					1–1		1–2		2–4	
Ndanda F.C.			1–2	0–1	0–2	2–2					0–0					1–0
Copco			0–1	1–0		1–2					0–1	1–1		0–3		

Updated to match(es) played on 1 September 2022. Source:
Legend: Blue = home team win; Yellow = draw; Red = away team win.

== Group A ==
- African Lyon F.C. (Dar es Salaam) (relegated to this division for this season)
- Ashanti United S.C. (Dar es Salaam)
- Friends Rangers F.C. (Dar es Salaam)
- JKT Mgambo F.C. (Tanga)
- JKT Ruvu Stars F.C. (Dodoma) (relegated to this division for this season)
- Kiluvya United F.C. (Pwani Region)
- Mshikamano F.C. (Dar es Salaam)
- Mvuvumwa F.C. (Kigoma)

== Group B ==
- Coastal Union F.C. (Tanga)
- JKT Mlale F.C. (Songea)
- Kinondoni Municipal Council F.C. (Dar es Salaam)
- Mawenzi Market F.C. (Morogoro) (promoted to this division for this season)
- Mbeya Warriors F.C. (Mbeya)
- Mufindi United F.C., formerly known as Kurugenzi F.C. (Iringa)
- Polisi Dar F.C. (Dar es Salaam)
- Tanzania Polisi F.C., formerly known as Polisi Morogoro F.C. (Moshi)

== Group C ==
- Alliance Schools F.C. (Mwanza)
- Biashara United (Musoma), formerly known as Polisi Mara F.C.
- Dodoma F.C., formerly known as Polisi Dodoma F.C. (Dodoma)
- JKT Oljoro F.C. (Arusha, but playing in Moshi this season) (promoted to this division for this season)
- Pamba S.C. (Mwanza)
- Rhino Rangers F.C. (Tabora)
- Toto African S.C. (Mwanza) (relegated to this division for this season)
- Transit Camp F.C. (Shinyanga) (promoted to this division for this season)

Clubs and stadiums:

Team	Location	Stadium	Capacity
Mbuni	Arusha	Sheikh Amri Abeid	
Pan African	Dar es-salaam		30,000
Mbeya Kwanza	Mbeya	Mabatini	30,000
African Sports	Tanga		
Gwambina	Mwanza	Uhuru Stadium	23,000
Ndanda FC	Mtwara	Nangwanda Sijaona Stadium	
Copco	Mwanza	Nyamagana	
Biashara	Musoma	Karume Stadium	
Green Warriors	Dar es-salaam	Uhuru	
Pamba	Mwanza		
Transit Camp	Shinyanga		
Kengold	Mwanza	Sokoine	
Kitayosce FC	Tabora	Ali Hassan Mwinyi	
Mashujaa	Kigoma		10,000
JKT Tanzania	Mwanza	Meja Jenerali Isamuhyo	35,000
Fountain Gate FC	Gairo	CCM Shabiby	

== 2016–17 season ==
The following teams participated in the 2016/17 First Division League:

=== Group A ===
- African Sports F.C. (Tanga) (relegated to this division for this season and then relegated to Second Division for 2017/18)
- Ashanti United S.C. (Dar es Salaam)
- Friends Rangers F.C. (Dar es Salaam)
- Kiluvya United F.C. (Pwani Region)
- Lipuli F.C. (Iringa) (promoted to Premier League for 2017/18)
- Mshikamano F.C. (Dar es Salaam) (promoted to this division for this season)
- Pamba S.C. (Mwanza) (promoted to this division for this season as a replacement for the teams relegated for match fixing in 2015/16)
- Polisi Dar F.C. (Dar es Salaam)

=== Group B ===
- Coastal Union F.C. (Tanga) (relegated to this division for this season)
- JKT Mlale F.C. (Songea)
- Kimondo Super S.C. (Mbeya) (failed to play its fixture on 28 January 2017 with JKT Mlale F.C. in Songea; penalties included disqualification from this competition, forfeiture of all group fixtures this season, and a two-level relegation to the regional competition for 2017/18)
- Kinondoni Municipal Council F.C. (Dar es Salaam)
- Kurugenzi F.C. (Iringa)
- Mbeya Warriors F.C. (Mbeya) (promoted to this division for this season)
- Njombe Mji F.C. (Njombe) (promoted to Premier League for 2017/18)
- Polisi Morogoro F.C. (Morogoro)

=== Group C ===
- Alliance Schools F.C. (Mwanza) (promoted to this division for this season)
- JKT Mgambo F.C. (Tanga) (relegated to this division for this season)
- Mvuvumwa F.C. (Kigoma) (promoted to this division for this season as a replacement for the teams relegated for match fixing in 2015/16)
- Panone F.C. (Moshi) (relegated to Second Division for 2017/18)
- Polisi Dodoma F.C. (Dodoma)
- Polisi Mara F.C. (Musoma)
- Rhino Rangers F.C. (Tabora)
- Singida United F.C. (Singida) (promoted to this division for this season and then promoted to Premier League for 2017/18)

== 2015–16 season ==
The following teams participated in the 2015/16 First Division League:

=== Group A ===
- African Lyon F.C. (Dar es Salaam) (promoted to Premier League for 2016/17)
- Ashanti United S.C. (Dar es Salaam)
- Friends Rangers F.C. (Dar es Salaam)
- Kiluvya United F.C. (Pwani Region) (promoted to this division for this season)
- Kinondoni Municipal Council F.C., formerly known as Tessema F.C. (Dar es Salaam)
- Mji Mkuu (CDA) F.C. (Dodoma) (promoted to this division for this season and then relegated to Second Division for 2016/17)
- Polisi Dar F.C. (Dar es Salaam)
- Polisi Dodoma F.C. (Dodoma)

=== Group B ===
- Burkinafaso F.C. (Morogoro) (relegated to Second Division for 2016/17)
- JKT Mlale F.C. (Songea)
- Kimondo Super S.C. (Mbeya)
- Kurugenzi F.C. (Iringa)
- Lipuli F.C. (Iringa)
- Njombe Mji F.C. (Njombe) (promoted to this division for this season)
- Polisi Morogoro F.C. (Morogoro) (relegated to this division for this season)
- Ruvu Shooting F.C. (Mlandizi) (relegated to this division for this season and then promoted to Premier League for 2016/17)

=== Group C ===
- Geita Gold S.C. (Geita) (penalized for fixing its 8-0 defeat of JKT Kanembwa by forfeiting all group games and being relegated to Second Division for 2016/17)
- JKT Kanembwa F.C. (Kigoma) (two-level relegation to regional competition for 2016/17, with one level resulting from fixing its 8-0 loss to Geita Gold F.C.; penalties also included forfeiture of all group games)
- JKT Oljoro F.C. (Arusha) (penalized for fixing its 7-0 loss to Polisi Tabora F.C. by forfeiting all group games and being relegated to Second Division for 2016/17)
- Mbao F.C. (Mwanza) (promoted to this division for this season; finished fourth on the field but elevated to first after four other teams forfeited all their group games; promoted to Premiere League for 2016/17)
- Panone F.C. (Moshi)
- Polisi Mara F.C. (Musoma)
- Polisi Tabora F.C. (Tabora) (penalized for fixing its 7-0 defeat of JKT Oljoro F.C. by forfeiting all group games and being relegated to Second Division for 2016/17)
- Rhino Rangers F.C. (Tabora)

== 2014–15 season ==
The following teams participated in the 2014/15 First Division League:

=== Group A ===
- African Lyon F.C. (Dar es Salaam)
- African Sports F.C. (Tanga) (promoted to this division for this season after winning Group A of the Regional Champions League in June 2014; promoted to Premier League for 2015/16)
- Ashanti United S.C. (Dar es Salaam) (relegated to this division for this season)
- Friends Rangers F.C. (Dar es Salaam)
- JKT Mlale F.C. (Songea)
- Kimondo Super S.C. (Mbeya)
- Kurugenzi F.C. (Iringa)
- Lipuli F.C. (Iringa)
- Maji Maji (Songea) (promoted to Premier League for 2015/16)
- Polisi Dar F.C. (Dar es Salaam)
- Tessema F.C. (Dar es Salaam)
- Villa Squad F.C. (Dar es Salaam)

=== Group B ===
- Burkinafaso F.C. (Morogoro)
- Geita Gold S.C. (Geita) (promoted to this division for this season after winning Group C of the Regional Champions League in June 2014)
- Green Warriors F.C. (Dar es Salaam) (relegated to Second Division for 2015/16)
- JKT Kanembwa F.C. (Kigoma)
- JKT Oljoro F.C. (Arusha) (relegated to this division for this season)
- Mwadui F.C. (Shinyanga) (promoted to Premier League for 2015/16)
- Panone F.C. (Moshi) (promoted to this division for this season after winning Group B of the Regional Champions League in June 2014)
- Polisi Dodoma F.C. (Dodoma)
- Polisi Mara F.C. (Musoma)
- Polisi Tabora F.C. (Tabora)
- Rhino Rangers F.C. (Tabora) (relegated to this division for this season)
- Toto African S.C. (Mwanza) (promoted to Premier League for 2015/16)

== 2013–14 season ==
The following teams participated in the 2013/14 First Division League:

=== Group A ===
- African Lyon F.C. (Dar es Salaam) (relegated to this division for this season)
- Friends Rangers F.C. (Dar es Salaam)
- Green Warriors F.C. (Dar es Salaam)
- Ndanda F.C. (Mtwara) (promoted to Premier League for 2014/15)
- Polisi Dar F.C. (Dar es Salaam)
- Tessema F.C. (Dar es Salaam)
- Transit Camp F.C. (Shinyanga) (relegated for 2014/15)
- Villa Squad F.C. (Dar es Salaam)

=== Group B ===
- Burkinafaso F.C. (Morogoro)
- JKT Mlale F.C. (Songea)
- Kimondo Super S.C. (Mbeya)
- Kurugenzi F.C. (Iringa)
- Lipuli F.C. (Iringa)
- Maji Maji F.C. (Songea)
- Mkamba Rangers F.C. (Morogoro) (relegated for 2014/15)
- Polisi Morogoro F.C. (Morogoro) (relegated to this division for this season and then promoted to Premier League for 2014/15)

=== Group C ===
- JKT Kanembwa F.C. (Kigoma)
- Mwadui F.C. (Shinyanga)
- Pamba S.C. (Mwanza) (relegated for 2014/15)
- Polisi Dodoma F.C. (Dodoma)
- Polisi Mara F.C. (Musoma)
- Polisi Tabora F.C. (Tabora)
- Stand United F.C. (Shinyanga) (promoted to Premier League for 2014/15)
- Toto African S.C. (Mwanza) (relegated to this division for this season)
