= Stamili Mbonde =

Tanzanian footballer

Personal information
- Full name: Stamili Mohamed Omar Mbonde
- Date of birth: 21 June 1990 (age 36)
- Place of birth: Dar-es-Salam, Tanzania
- Position: Forward

Team information
- Current team: Mtibwa Sugar

Senior career*
Years	Team	Apps	(Gls)
–2014	Villa Squad		
2014–2015	Ndanda		
2016–	Mtibwa Sugar		
2015–2016	Maji Maji		

International career^{‡}
2017	Tanzania	3	(0)
- * Club domestic league appearances and goals as of 1 August 2020 ‡ National team caps and goals as of 1 August 2020

Stamili Mbonde (born 21 June 1990) is a Tanzanian football striker who plays for Mtibwa Sugar.
