= Hamisi Yusuf =

Tanzanian footballer

Personal information
- Full name: Abdul Hamisi Yusuf Mtiro
- Date of birth: 8 August 1982 (age 44)
- Place of birth: Mwanza, Tanzania
- Position: Striker

Senior career*
Years	Team	Apps	(Gls)
2001–2004	Young Africans		
2005	APR FC		
2006–2010	Young Africans		
2010–2011	Arusha		
2011	Ferroviário de Nampula		
2012–2016	African Lyon		

International career^{‡}
2002–2007	Tanzania	11	(1)
- * Club domestic league appearances and goals as of 10 May 2021 ‡ National team caps and goals as of 10 May 2021

Hamisi Yusuf (born 8 August 1982) is a retired Tanzanian football striker.
