= TFF Awards =

Annual Tanzania association football award

- Awarded for: Outstanding achievements in the Football
- Country: Tanzania
- Presented by: Tanzania Football Federation
- First award: January 7, 2010; 16 years ago

Television/radio coverage
- Network: Azam TV (2015–present)

The Tanzania Football Federation Awards is a football award presented annually by the Tanzania Football Federation (TFF), the sport's governing body. The awards honor for players playing in Tanzanian Premier League, Championship, First League, Women's Premier League and FA Cup, as well as to Coaches, Match Commissioners, Referees and Stadium Managers.
