= Godfrey Taita =

Tanzanian footballer

Personal information
- Full name: Godfrey Taita Magina
- Date of birth: 26 February 1986 (age 40)
- Place of birth: Kigogo, Tanzania
- Height: 1.58 m (5 ft 2 in)
- Position: Midfielder

Senior career*
Years	Team	Apps	(Gls)
- Ashanti United
2009–2011	Kagera Sugar		
2011–2013	Young Africans		
2013–2015	Villa Squad		
2015–2016	Maji Maji		
2016–2018	Kagera Sugar		

International career^{‡}
2011	Tanzania	3	(0)
- * Club domestic league appearances and goals as of 1 August 2020 ‡ National team caps and goals as of 1 August 2020

Godfrey Taita (born 26 February 1986) is a retired Tanzanian football midfielder.
