= Francis Busungu =

Tanzanian footballer

Personal information
- Full name: Francis Malimi Busungu
- Date of birth: 10 April 1991 (age 35)
- Position: Forward

Senior career*
Years	Team	Apps	(Gls)
2010–2011	Villa Squad		
2011–2012	Coastal Union		
2012–2013	Polisi		
2013–2014	Kagera Sugar		
2014–2015	JKT Mgambo		
2015–2017	Young Africans		
2017–2019	Lipuli		

International career^{‡}
2015	Tanzania	3	(0)
- * Club domestic league appearances and goals as of 11 August 2021 ‡ National team caps and goals as of 11 August 2021

Francis Busungu (born 10 April 1991) is a Tanzanian football striker.
