= Tanzanian First League =

Association football league

Ligi Daraja La Pili
- Country: Tanzania
- Confederation: Tanzania Premier League Board
- Number of clubs: 16
- Level on pyramid: 3
- Promotion to: Tanzanian Championship League
- Relegation to: Tanzanian Regional Champions League
- Domestic cup: Azam Sports Federation Cup
- International cup: CAF Confederations Cup (via the Nyerere Cup)

The First League Tanzania ("Ligi Daraja La Pili" in Swahili) is the third tier of league football in Tanzania. The league is divided into two groups, with each group having eight teams. A round-robin format is played and followed by a play-off tournament for promotion and relegation.

== 2017/18 season ==
The following teams are participating in the Tanzanian Second Division League during 2017/18:

=== Group A ===
- Abajalo F.C. (Dar es Salaam)
- Changanyikeni F.C. (Dar es Salaam)
- Cosmopolitans F.C. (Dar es Salaam)
- Green Warriors F.C. (Dar es Salaam)
- Reha F.C. (Dar es Salaam) (promoted to this division for this season)
- Villa Squad F.C. (Dar es Salaam) (promoted to this division for this season)

=== Group B ===
- African Sports F.C. (Tanga) (relegated to this division for this season)
- Arusha F.C. (Arusha)
- Kilimanjaro Heroes F.C., formerly known as Panone F.C. (Moshi) (relegated to this division for this season)
- Kitayosce F.C. (Moshi)
- Madini S.C. (Arusha)
- Pepsi F.C. (Arusha)

=== Group C ===
- Boma F.C. (Mbeya) (promoted to this division for this season)
- Bukinafaso F.C. (Morogoro)
- Ihefu F.C. (Mbeya) (promoted to this division for this season)
- Mighty Elephant F.C. (Songea)
- Mkamba Rangers F.C. (Morogoro)
- Namungo F.C. (Lindi)

=== Group D ===
- Area C United F.C. (Dodoma) (promoted to this division for this season)
- Bulyanhulu F.C. (Shinyanga)
- Mashujaa F.C. (Kigoma)
- Mirambo S.C. (Tabora)
- Msange JKT F.C. (Tabora) (promoted to this division for this season)
- Nyanza F.C. (Mererani) (promoted to this division for this season)

== 2016/17 season ==
The following teams participated in the 2016/17 Tanzanian Second Division League:

=== Group A ===
- Bulyanhulu F.C. (Shinyanga)
- Geita Gold S.C. (Geita) (penalized for fixing a First Division game in 2015/16 by being relegated to this division for this season; relegated to regional competition for 2017/18)
- Mashujaa F.C. (Kigoma) (promoted to this division for this season)
- Mirambo S.C. (Tabora)
- Polisi Tabora S.C. (Tabora) (penalized for fixing a First Division game in 2015/16 by being relegated to this division for this season; relegated to regional competition for 2017/18)
- Transit Camp F.C. (Shinyanga) (promoted to First Division for 2017/18)

=== Group B ===
- Arusha F.C. (Arusha)
- Green Warriors F.C. (Dar es Salaam)
- JKT Oljoro F.C. (Arusha) (penalized for fixing a First Division game in 2015/16 by being relegated to this division for this season; promoted to First Division for 2017/18)
- Kitayosce F.C. (Moshi) (promoted to this division for this season)
- Madini S.C. (Arusha)
- Pepsi F.C. (Arusha) (promoted to this division for this season)

=== Group C ===
- Abajalo F.C. (Dar es Salaam)
- Bukinafaso F.C. (Morogoro) (relegated to this division for this season)
- Changanyikeni F.C. (Dar es Salaam)
- Cosmopolitans F.C. (Dar es Salaam)
- Kariakoo F.C. (Lindi) (relegated to regional competition for 2017/18)
- Mji Mkuu (CDA) F.C. (Dodoma) (relegated to this division for this season and then relegated to regional competition for 2017/18)

=== Group D ===
- Mawenzi Market F.C. (Morogoro) (promoted to this division for this season and then promoted to First Division for 2017/18)
- Mighty Elephant F.C. (Songea)
- Mkamba Rangers F.C. (Morogoro)
- Namungo F.C. (Lindi) (promoted to this division for this season)
- Sabasaba F.C. (Morogoro) (relegated to regional competition for 2017/18)
- Wenda F.C. (Mbeya) (relegated to regional competition for 2017/18)

== 2015/16 season ==
The following teams participated in the 2015/16 Tanzanian Second Division League:

=== Group A ===
- Abajalo S.C. (Tabora) (relegated to regional competition for 2016/17)
- Green Warriors F.C. (Dar es Salaam) (relegated to this division for this season)
- Mirambo S.C. (Tabora)
- Mvuvumwa F.C. (Kigoma) (group 2nd place: promoted to First Division for 2016/17 through mini-league of 2nd-place finishers)
- Singida United F.C. (Singida) (group winner: promoted to First Division for 2016/17)
- Transit Camp F.C. (Shinyanga)

=== Group B ===
- Alliance Schools F.C. (Mwanza) (group winner: promoted to First Division for 2016/17)
- Arusha F.C. (Arusha)
- Bulyanhulu F.C. (Shinyanga)
- JKT Rwamkoma F.C. (Musoma) (relegated to regional competition for 2016/17)
- Madini S.C. (Arusha)
- Pamba S.C. (Mwanza) (group 2nd place: promoted to First Division for 2016/17 through mini-league of 2nd-place finishers)

=== Group C ===
- Abajalo F.C. (Dar es Salaam) (group 2nd place)
- Changanyikeni F.C. (Dar es Salaam)
- Cosmopolitans F.C. (Dar es Salaam)
- Kariakoo F.C. (Lindi)
- Mshikamano F.C. (Dar es Salaam) (group winner: promoted to First Division for 2016/17)
- Villa Squad F.C. (Dar es Salaam) (relegated to regional competition for 2016/17)

=== Group D ===
- African Wanderers F.C. (Iringa) (relegated to regional competition for 2016/17)
- Mbeya Warriors F.C. (Mbeya) (group winner: promoted to First Division for 2016/17)
- Mighty Elephant F.C. (Songea) (group 2nd place)
- Mkamba Rangers F.C. (Morogoro)
- Sabasaba F.C. (Morogoro)
- Wenda F.C. (Mbeya)
