= Haruna Ramadhan Shamte =

Tanzanian footballer

Personal information
- Date of birth: 27 December 1988 (age 37)
- Place of birth: Mwanza, Tanzania
- Height: 1.79 m (5 ft 10 in)
- Position: Defender

Team information
- Current team: Simba

Senior career*
Years	Team	Apps	(Gls)
2008–2014	Simba		
2011–2012	→ Villa Squad (loan)		
2014–2015	JKT Ruvu Stars		
2015–2018	Mbeya City		
2018–2019	Lipuli		
2019–	Simba		

International career^{‡}
2010–2019	Tanzania	3	(0)
- * Club domestic league appearances and goals as of 1 August 2021 ‡ National team caps and goals as of 1 August 2021

Haruna Ramadhan Shamte (born 27 December 1988) is a Tanzanian football defender who plays for Simba.
