= Rashid Chidi Gumbo =

Tanzanian footballer

Rashid Gumbo
Personal information
- Full name: Rashid Chidi Gumbo
- Date of birth: 14 October 1988 (age 38)
- Place of birth: Dar es Salaam, Tanzania
- Height: 1.70 m (5 ft 7 in)
- Position: Midfielder

Senior career*
Years	Team	Apps	(Gls)
2003–2005	Forodha		
2006–2008	La Passe		
2008–2009	Mtibwa Sugar		
2009–2010	African Lyon	8	(2)
2010–2011	Simba S.C.		
2011–2014	Young Africans S.C.		
2014–2016	La Passe		
2016–2018	Singida United		
2018	Anse Réunion		

International career^{‡}
2009–2011	Tanzania	5	(2)
- * Club domestic league appearances and goals as of 14 April 2021 ‡ National team caps and goals as of 14 April 2021

Rashid Chidi Gumbo (born 14 October 1988 in Dar es Salaam) is a retired Tanzanian football midfielder.

== Career ==
Gumbo played for Mtibwa Sugar F.C. before signing in 2009 for African Lyon. During the 2009-10 Tanzanian Premier League season, Gumbo scored two goals in eight games and received only a yellow card.

== International career ==
He played his first international football game for the Tanzania national football team against the Rwanda national football team in August 2009. The game was played at Stade Amahoro in Kigali, Rwanda. Gumbo scored the game-winning goal as the game finished 1–2 for Tanzania.
