= Paul Nonga =

Tanzanian footballer

Personal information
- Date of birth: 18 June 1989 (age 37)
- Place of birth: Morogoro, Tanzania
- Position: Forward

Team information
- Current team: mbeya cityF.C.

Senior career*
Years	Team	Apps	(Gls)
2011–2013	JKT Oljoro		
2013–2015	Mbeya City		
2015–2016	Young Africans		
2016–2018	Mwadui United		
2018–	Lipuli		

International career^{‡}
2019	Tanzania	4	(0)
- * Club domestic league appearances and goals as of 11 August 2021 ‡ National team caps and goals as of 11 August 2021

Paul Nonga (born 18 June 1989) is a Tanzanian football striker who plays for mbeya city F.C.
