= Pius Kisambale =

Tanzanian footballer

Personal information
- Full name: Pius Henry Kisambale
- Date of birth: 21 December 1987 (age 38)
- Height: 1.73 m (5 ft 8 in)
- Position: Striker

Senior career*
Years	Team	Apps	(Gls)
–2008	Simba		
2008–2009	Moro United		
2009–2010	Mtibwa Sugar		
2010–2011	JKT Ruvu Stars		
2011–2012	Young Africans		
2012–2014	Coastal Union		
2014	Saraswoti Youth Club		
2014–2017	Villa Squad		
2017–2019	Discovery Bay		

International career^{‡}
2008	Tanzania	1	(0)
- * Club domestic league appearances and goals as of 10 May 2021 ‡ National team caps and goals as of 10 May 2021

Pius Henry Kisambale (born 21 December 1987) is a retired Tanzanian football striker.
