= Emmanuel Simwanza =

Tanzanian footballer

Personal information
- Full name: Emmanuel Simwanza Namwando
- Date of birth: 12 December 1992 (age 33)
- Position: Defender

Senior career*
Years	Team	Apps	(Gls)
2013–2014	African Lyon		
2014–2016	Mwadui United		
2016	Simba		
2017	Maji Maji		
2017–2019	African Lyon		

International career^{‡}
2015	Tanzania	1	(0)
- * Club domestic league appearances and goals as of 1 August 2021 ‡ National team caps and goals as of 1 August 2021

Emmanuel Simwanza (born 12 December 1992) is a retired Tanzanian football defender.
