= Bombo Hospital =

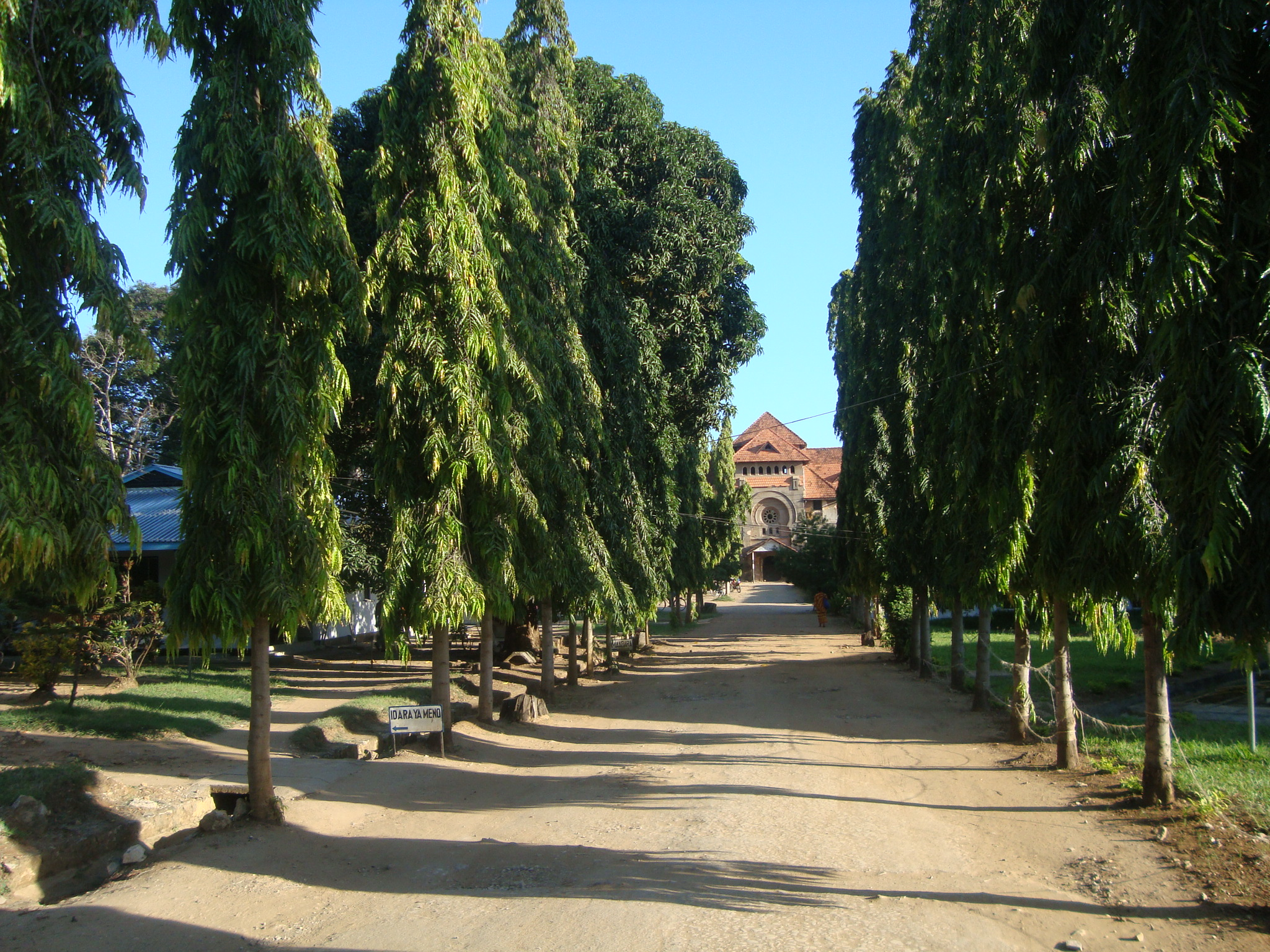
- Hospital entrance

Geography
- Location: Tanga, Tanzania
- Coordinates: 5°03′47″N 39°06′44″E

Organisation
- Type: Regional Referral

History
- Opened: 1901

Links
- Lists: Hospitals in Tanzania

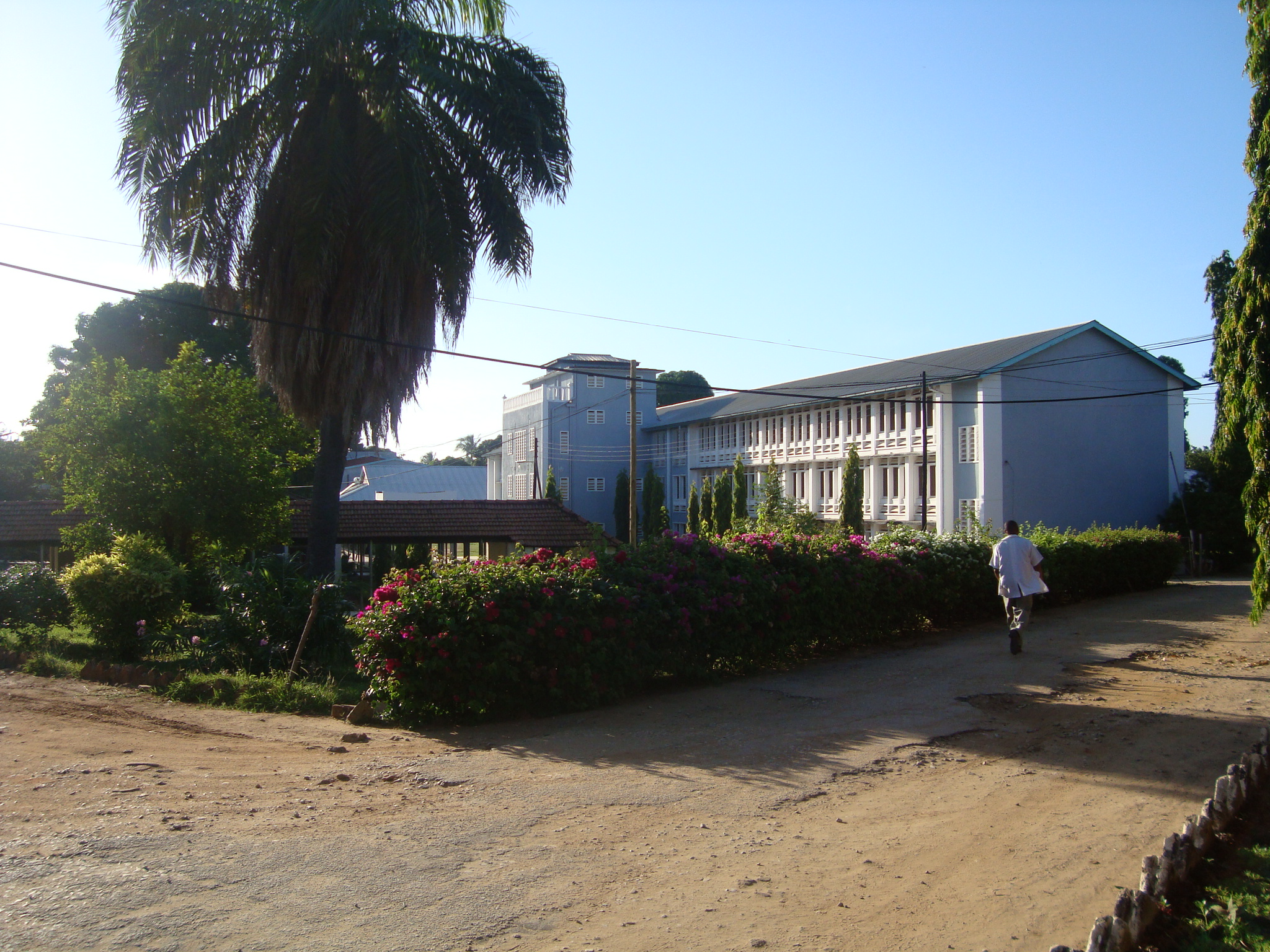
Hospital building

Bombo Regional Hospital is the referral regional hospital in Tanga, Tanzania. It was built by the Germans in 1901, the first hospital in East Africa.

The hospital is affiliated with the National Institute of Medical Research center in Tanga, to which it is adjacent.

The Tanga Aids Working Group, a member of Eastern and Southern Africa Regional Initiative on Traditional Medicine and AIDS, is headquartered at Bombo Hospital.
