= Athanas Mdamu =

Tanzanian footballer

Personal information
- Full name: Athanas Enemias Mdamula
- Date of birth: 3 July 1998 (age 28)
- Place of birth: Nyamagana, Tanzania
- Height: 1.68 m (5 ft 6 in)
- Position: Forward

Team information
- Current team: Alliance Academy

Senior career*
Years	Team	Apps	(Gls)
2013–2018	Alliance Academy		
2018	Singida United		
2019	Kariobangi Sharks	3	(0)
2019–	Alliance Academy		

International career^{‡}
2014	Tanzania	1	(0)
- * Club domestic league appearances and goals as of 22 April 2021 ‡ National team caps and goals as of 22 April 2021

Athanas Mdamu (born 3 July 1998) is a Tanzanian football striker who plays for Alliance Academy.
