= Athumani Miraji =

Tanzanian footballer

Personal information
- Full name: Athumani Miraji Madenge
- Date of birth: 29 October 1993 (age 33)
- Place of birth: Tanzania
- Height: 1.72 m (5 ft 8 in)
- Position: Striker

Team information
- Current team: Simba
- Number: 21

Senior career*
Years	Team	Apps	(Gls)
2015–2016	Toto African		
2016–2018	Mwadui United		
2018–2019	Lipuli		
2019–	Simba		

International career
2019–	Tanzania	5	(0)
- * Club domestic league appearances and goals

Athumani Miraji Madenge (born 29 October 1993) is a Tanzanian footballer who plays as a striker for Tanzanian club Simba and the Tanzania national team.

== International career ==
Madenge made his international debut for Tanzania on 14 October 2019, in a friendly against Rwanda. He participated at the 2020 African Nations Championship qualification against Sudan, helping his side qualify to the final tournament. Madenge played three games at the 2019 CECAFA Cup, with Tanzania finishing in fourth place.

== Honours ==
=== Club ===
Simba

- Tanzanian Premier League: 2019–20
- FAT Cup: 2019–20
- Community Shield: 2019, 2020
- Mapinduzi Cup runner-up: 2019, 2020
