= Mkwakwani Stadium =

Stadium in Tanzania

- Uwanja wa Mkwakwani (Swahili)
- Location in Tanzania
- Location: Tanga, Tanzania
- Coordinates: 5.073355°S 39.101426°E
- Owner: Chama Cha Mapinduzi
- Capacity: 15,000
- Type: Multi-purpose stadium
- Field size: 105 × 68 m

Construction
- Built: 1973
- Main contractor: Amboni Plantations

Tenants
- Coastal Union F.C., African Sports, JKT Mgambo

Mkwakwani Stadium is a multi-purpose stadium in Tanga, Tanzania. It is used mostly for football matches, being the home venue for Coastal Union F.C., African Sports, and JKT Mgambo. It has a seating capacity of 15,000 people.

== See also ==
- List of stadiums in Tanzania
