= Fredy Mbuna =

Tanzanian footballer (born 1982)

Personal information
- Date of birth: 6 March 1982 (age 44)
- Place of birth: Dar-es-Salaam, Tanzania
- Height: 1.84 m (6 ft 0 in)
- Position: Right back

Senior career*
Years	Team	Apps	(Gls)
2000–2011	Young Africans FC		
2011–2013	Moro United		
2013–2017	Maji Maji F.C.		

International career
2002–2008	Tanzania	4	(0)
- * Club domestic league appearances and goals

Fredy Mbuna (born 6 March 1982) is a Tanzanian footballer.

== Club career ==
Mbuna spent most of his career playing for Young Africans S.C., but had a loan deal to Moro United F.C., made permanent in 2011. For the 2013–14 season, he signed for Maji Maji FC.

== International career ==
Mbuna appeared for the Tanzania national football team in a FIFA World Cup qualifying match.
