= Cosmopolitans F.C. =

Tanzanian football club

Cosmopolitans FC
- Full name: Cosmopolitans Football Club
- Founded: 1956
- Ground: Chamazi Stadium; Dar es Salaam, Tanzania
- Capacity: 5,000
- League: Tanzanian Second Division League
- 2024–25: Tanzanian Championship League, 15th of 16 (relegated)

Cosmopolitans Football Club is a Tanzanian football club who plays in the Tanzanian Second Division League. The club is based in Dar es Salaam.

In 1967 the team has won the Tanzanian Premier League.

== Stadium ==
Currently the team plays at the 5000 capacity Chamazi Stadium.

== Honours ==
- Tanzanian Premier League
  - Champions (1): 1967

== Performance in CAF competitions ==
- African Cup of Champions Clubs: 1 appearance

1968 – First Round
