= Vicent Barnabas =

Tanzanian footballer

Personal information
- Full name: Vicent Barnabas Saramba
- Date of birth: 17 January 1985 (age 41)
- Place of birth: Mbeya, Tanzania
- Height: 1.70 m (5 ft 7 in)
- Position: Forward

Senior career*
Years	Team	Apps	(Gls)
2005–2007	Kagera Sugar		
2008–2009	Young Africans		
2009–2010	African Lyon		
2010–2018	Mtibwa Sugar		

International career^{‡}
2005–2013	Tanzania	14	(0)
- * Club domestic league appearances and goals as of 22 April 2021 ‡ National team caps and goals as of 22 April 2021

Vicent Barnabas (born 17 January 1985) is a retired Tanzanian football striker.
