= Gwambina F.C. =

- Full name: Gwambina Football Club
- Founded: 21 June 2019
- Ground: Gwambina Stadium, Misungwi
- Capacity: 10,000
- Coordinates: 2.8131°S 33.0881°E
- League: Championship
colours

Gwambina Football Club is an association football club from Misungwi, Misungwi District, Mwanza Region in Tanzania.

The club was founded when Arusha United was purchased and rebranded by the Manyara Regional Commissioner (RC), Alexander Mnyeti in May 2019. Gwambina won promotion to the Tanzanian Premier League in June 2020.

== Supporters ==
Gwambina FC draws its fan base from the Misungwai district, the capital of the Mwanza region.
