= Copco Veteran F.C. =

Football club in Tanzania

Copco FC
- Full name: Copco Veteran FC
- Founded: 2013
- Ground: Nyamagana stadium Mwanza, Tanzania
- Capacity: 15,000
- Chairman: Simon Rungwa
- Manager: Faisal Hau
- League: Championship
- Website: https://www.tzchampionship.com/leagues/50540/teams/244153
Home colours

Copco Veteran Football Club is a football club based in Ilemela, Mwanza, a port city on the shore of Lake Victoria, in northern Tanzania. The team is currently playing in the Tanzanian Championship.

== History ==
Copco FC was founded in the Buchosa Sengerema District, Mwanza region in 2013 but is currently based in Ilemela district in Mwanza. They are playing in the championship for the first time.

== Colours and badge ==
Copco FC's colors are blue at home and white when playing away. They also use black color as a third kit. The Copco Veteran FC badge has the inception date (2013), the words michezo ni ajira and Tanzanian flag on a football.

== Stadium ==
Copco FC play their home matches at the Nyamagana stadium which capacity of 15,000.

== Supporters ==
Copco FC draws its fan base from the Mwanza region, the political capital of Mwanza region.

== Squad ==
As of 17 September 2022

Note: Flags indicate national team as defined under FIFA eligibility rules; some limited exceptions apply. Players may hold more than one non-FIFA nationality.

No.	Pos.	Nation	Player
11	FW	TAN	James Naku Kazimoto
17	FW	TAN	Alphonce Sospeter Guleta
18	FW	TAN	Mohamedi Abuu Mondo
19	MF	TAN	Lazaro Joseph Mlingwa
16	MF	TAN	Juma Hamis Nade
9	MF	TAN	Malacki Joseph Magogwa
18	MF	TAN	Syprian Benedictor Mtesigwa
10	MF	TAN	Ashley Elia
19	MF	TAN	Newton Philadelph Kituku
7	MF	TAN	Seleman Richard Seif
20	MF	TAN	Hussein Zuberi Juma
21	MF	TAN	Hafidhi Alianuni Mbaga
15	MF	TAN	Nicodemas Nicephroy Mwanalyela

No.	Pos.	Nation	Player
12	DF	TAN	Francis Joseph Ndala
3	DF	TAN	Augustino Atanas Chalamba
2	DF	TAN	Mohammed January Alex
22	DF	TAN	Ally Athumani Ekwabi
6	DF	TAN	Mack Mome Saimoni
4	DF	TAN	Mohamed Salum Katoto
8	DF	TAN	Sharifu Iddi Yahya
1	GK	TAN	Mohamed Azizi Hussein
23	DF	TAN	Makenzi Ramadhani
24	GK	TAN	Nelson Wilbroad Urbano
5	MF	TAN	Salum Maulindi Omary
13	FW	TAN	Amani Mlenda Juma
