= Shafik Batambuze =

Ugandan international footballer (born 1994)

Personal information
- Full name: Shafik Bhuchu Batambuze
- Date of birth: 14 June 1994 (age 32)
- Place of birth: Jinja, Uganda
- Height: 1.83 m (6 ft 0 in)
- Position: Midfielder

Team information
- Current team: Gor Mahia

Senior career*
Years	Team	Apps	(Gls)
2009–2011	Simba		
2012	Muhoroni Youth		
2012–2013	SC Villa		
2013–2014	Western Stima		
2014	Sofapaka		
2015	Western Stima		
2016–2017	Tusker	41	(6)
2017–2018	Singida United		
2018–	Gor Mahia		

International career^{‡}
2016–	Uganda	3	(0)
- * Club domestic league appearances and goals as of 16:02, 9 March 2018 (UTC) ‡ National team caps and goals as of 16:02, 9 March 2018 (UTC)

Shafik Bhuchu Batambuze (born 14 June 1994) is a Ugandan international footballer who plays for Gor Mahia in Kenya as a midfielder.

== Career ==
Batambuze has played for Simba, Muhoroni Youth, SC Villa, Western Stima, Sofapaka, Tusker and Singida United.

He made his international debut in 2016, and was named in the squad for the 2017 Africa Cup of Nations.
