= Adam Kingwande =

Tanzanian footballer

Personal information
- Full name: Adamu Juma Said Kingwande
- Date of birth: 1 September 1989 (age 37)
- Place of birth: Dar-es-Salaam, Tanzania
- Height: 1.70 m (5 ft 7 in)
- Position: Midfielder

Senior career*
Years	Team	Apps	(Gls)
2007–2008	Ashanti United		
2008–2009	Simba		
2009–2013	African Lyon		
2013–2015	Kagera Sugar		
2016–2017	Stand United		
2017–2018	KMC		

International career^{‡}
2008	Tanzania	2	(0)
- * Club domestic league appearances and goals as of 10 May 2021 ‡ National team caps and goals as of 10 May 2021

Adam Kingwande (born 1 September 1989) is a retired Tanzanian football midfielder.
