= Albino United F.C. =

Albino United Football Club is an association football club based in Dar es Salaam, Tanzania.

== History ==
Albino United FC was founded in 2008.
