= Polisi Tanzania =

Polisi Tanzania F.C.
- Full name: Polisi Tanzania Football Club
- Ground: Ushirika Stadium, Kilimanjaro Region
- Owner: Tanzania Police Academy
- Chairman: Camillus Wambura
- League: Tanzanian Championship League
- 2024–25: Tanzanian Championship League, 10th of 16

Polisi Tanzania (Polisi Morogoro) is a Tanzanian football club in Moshi, Kilimanjaro.

The 2015/16 season they are playing in the Tanzanian First Division League. They previously played in the top level of Tanzanian professional football, the Tanzanian Premier League.
