= Monja Liseki =

Tanzanian footballer

Personal information
- Date of birth: 8 August 1979 (age 47)
- Place of birth: Kinondoni, Tanzania
- Position: Forward

Senior career*
Years	Team	Apps	(Gls)
1999–2007	Mtibwa Sugar		
2008–2009	Al-Shaab Hadramaut		
2010	Zanzibar Ocean View		
2010–2012	Mtibwa Sugar		
2012–2014	Miembeni		

International career^{‡}
2002–2003	Tanzania	3	(0)
- * Club domestic league appearances and goals as of 22 April 2021 ‡ National team caps and goals as of 22 April 2021

Monja Liseki (born 8 August 1979) is a retired Tanzanian football striker.
