= Polisi Dodoma =

F.C. Dodoma
- Full name: Football Club Dodoma
- Ground: Jamhuri Stadium; Dodoma, Tanzania
- Capacity: 10,000
- League: Tanzanian First Division League
- 2010/11: 8th

Dodoma F.C., previously known as Polisi Dodoma, is a Tanzanian football club based in Dodoma. Their home games are played at 10,000 capacity Jamhuri Stadium. They played in the Tanzanian First Division League in the 2017/18 season. As of 2022, they play in the Tanzanian Premier League.
