= African Lyon F.C. =

Association football club in Tanzania

African Lyon FC
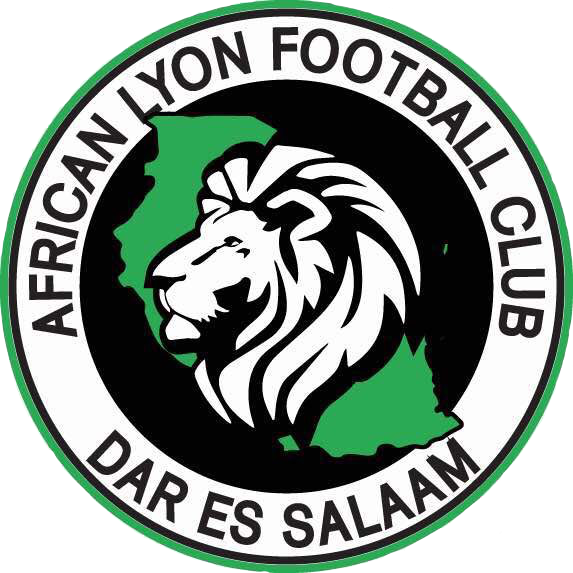
- Full name: African Lyon Football Club
- Founded: 14 June 2000; 25 years ago (as "Mbagara Market F.C.")
- Ground: Uhuru Stadium; Dar es Salaam, Tanzania
- Capacity: 23,000
- Owner: Rahim J Kangezi
- Vice Chairman: Omar Al Raisi
- Head Coach: Kharid Adam Munisson
- League: Tanzanian Premier League
- 2016–17: 9th
- Website: www.africanlyonfc.com
Home colours

African Lyon is a football club in Dar es Salaam, Tanzania. Currently they play in the top level of Tanzanian professional football, the Tanzanian Premier League, after winning the First Division League's Group A in the 2015–16 season.

== History ==
Founded on June 14, 2000, African Lyon FC is one of the top Football clubs in Tanzania, based in the capital city of Dar es Salaam. African Lyon plays in the top division of Tanzanian professional football league, the Tanzanian Premier League. The club is owned by Rahim Kangezi. In 2017 a minority stake of the club was purchased by Middle East-based sports media group, DANTANI, Inc. Sports under the banner of Dantani Football Group led by Omar Al Raisi.

== Current squad ==
Note: Flags indicate national team as defined under FIFA eligibility rules; some limited exceptions apply. Players may hold more than one non-FIFA nationality.

No.	Pos.	Nation	Player
1	GK	TAN	Victor Lwalance
2	DF	TAN	Godfrey Sabasi
3	DF	TAN	Pascal John
4	DF	TAN	Emmanuel Simwanza (Vice-captain)
5	DF	TAN	Mussa January
6	DF	TAN	Emmanuel Daudi (Captain)
7	MF	TAN	Mwarami Abdallah
8	MF	TAN	Saidi Mtikila
9	FW	TAN	Mussa Gadi
10	FW	TAN	Ramadhani Ashim
11	MF	TAN	Maulid Maulid Timam
12	MF	TAN	Ladislaus Stanslaus
13	FW	TAN	Yusuph Mwera
14	DF	TAN	Rehani Kibingu
15	DF	TAN	Godfrey Mwashuya
16	DF	TAN	Asonile Malichela
17	MF	TAN	Jery Tegete
18	FW	TAN	Kassim Juma

No.	Pos.	Nation	Player
19	DF	TAN	Monja Liseki
20	GK	TAN	Bwanaeli Abdallah
21	MF	TAN	Hamis Shengo
22	GK	KEN	Juma Mbugua
23	DF	TAN	Johannes Kajuna
24	FW	TAN	Karume Songoro
25	MF	TAN	Mohammed Samatta
26	DF	TAN	Saidi Mwarami
27	FW	TAN	Benedicto Jackob
28	MF	TAN	Sultan Kittu
30	MF	TAN	Rashid Chidi Gumbo
31	MF	TAN	Razack Khalfan (on loan from Young Africans FC)
32	FW	TAN	Adam Kingwande (on loan from Simba SC)
33	DF	TAN	George Nyanda (on loan from Simba SC)
34	MF	TAN	Ulimboka Mwakingwe
35	FW	TAN	Vincent Barnabas (on loan from Young Africans FC)
36	MF	TAN	Meshack Abel (on loan from Simba SC)
92	FW	MKD	Alexandar Trajkovski
—	MF	FRA	Victor Da Costa

=== Officials ===
==== Management ====
- Owner: Rahim J Kangezi
- Chairman: Jay Kangezi
- Vice Chairman: Omar Al Raisi
- Club Secretary: Ernest Brown
- Finance Director: Ibrahim Salim
- Manager: Salvatory Edward
- Media Officer: Dimo
- Logistics: Sheraly Abdallah
- Treasurer: Ibrahim Salim
- Non Executive Board Member Dr Prateek Kumar

==== Sports ====
- Head Coach: Kharid Adam Munisson
- Assistant Coach: Adam Kipatacho
- Goalkeeping Coach: Juma Bomba
- Physical Coach: George Ole
- Statistician:
- Opposition Analysis:

==== Medical ====
- Kit Manager: Saleh Hassan
- Team Doctor:
- Physio:

== U-20 Squad ==
Note: Flags indicate national team as defined under FIFA eligibility rules; some limited exceptions apply. Players may hold more than one non-FIFA nationality.

No.	Pos.	Nation	Player
16	DF	TAN	Abdul Massenga
18	FW	TAN	Mike Katenda
24	MF	TAN	Victor Tubanga

No.	Pos.	Nation	Player
27	DF	TAN	Zubeir Makame
28	MF	TAN	Aziz Zuba
31	FW	TAN	Ariri Charles
