= Singida United F.C. =

- Full name: Singida United Football Club
- Founded: 1972; 53 years ago (as Mto Sports club)
- Ground: Namfua Stadium, Singida
- League: Tanzanian Premier League
- 2022–23: 4th
- Website: www.facebook.com/singidaunited/
Home colours	Away colours

Singida United is a Tanzanian football club based in Singida that plays in the Tanzanian Premier League. They play their home games at Namfua stadium in Singida. Singida United won back to back promotions winning the Tanzanian Second Division League Group A in 2016 and the Tanzanian First Division League Group C in 2017. Serbian Dragan Popadic was appointed head coach with Dusan Momcilovic assistant coach on January 12, 2019.

== History ==
The club began in 1972 as Mto Sports Club in Singida in Central Tanzania. The club started small and began to gain traction in the public eye in the mid-1990s. In 2000 the club made its first appearance in the top-tier league, the Tanzanian Premier League. The appearance failed and the club was relegated in 2001. Since 2013, the team made great strides in the Tanzanian Second Division League and the Tanzanian First Division League.

In 2017 the club was promoted back to the Tanzanian Premier League and, the club managed to attract major sponsors. With SportPesa's entry into Tanzania, the club managed to get a sponsorship contract with the betting company, along with Puma Energy Tanzania.

Singida finished the 2018/19 Tanzanian Premier League season in 13th place with 46 points and a record of 11 wins 13 draws and 14 defeats from 38 matches. They reached the Azam Sports Federation Cup Quarter Final, losing 2–0 to Lipuli FC.

== Achievements ==
- 2016 Tanzanian First Division League Group C Winners
- 2017 Tanzanian Second Division League Group A Winners

== Current squad 2018/19 ==
Note: Flags indicate national team as defined under FIFA eligibility rules; some limited exceptions apply. Players may hold more than one non-FIFA nationality.

No.	Pos.	Nation	Player
—	GK	(Tanzania) TAN	Ally Mustapha
—	GK	(Tanzania) TAN	Peter Manyika
—	GK	(Tanzania) TAN	Kissu David
—	DF	(Tanzania) TAN	Miraji Adam
—	DF	(Tanzania) TAN	Boniface Maganga
—	DF	(Uganda) UGA	Shafik Batambuze
—	DF	(Tanzania) TAN	jamal mwambaleko
—	DF	(Tanzania) TAN	Kennedy Juma
—	DF	(Tanzania) TAN	Salum Kipaga
—	DF	(Tanzania) TAN	Salum Chuku
—	DF	(Tanzania) TAN	Rahab Zahir
—	DF	(Tanzania) TAN	swalehe abdullah
—	DF	(Zimbabwe) ZIM	Elisha Muroiwa
—	MF	(Tanzania) TAN	Yusuph Kagoma
—	MF	(Tanzania) TAN	Kazungu Mashauri
—	MF	(Ivory Coast) CIV	Diaby Amara
—	MF	(Tanzania) TAN	Kenny Ally
—	MF	(Tanzania) TAN	Aweso Juma

No.	Pos.	Nation	Player
—	MF	(Tanzania) TAN	Issa Makamba
—	MF	(Tanzania) TAN	Ally Ng'anzi
—	MF	(Tanzania) TAN	Nizar Khalfan
—	FW	(Tanzania) TAN	Rashid Simkoko
—	FW	(Tanzania) TAN	Habib Kyombo
—	FW	(Tanzania) TAN	John Tiber
—	FW	(Zambia) ZAM	Lubinda Mundia
—	FW	(Tanzania) TAN	Athanas Mdamu
—	FW	(Tanzania) TAN	Assad Juma
—	FW	(Tanzania) TAN	Mohamed Tello
—	FW	(Tanzania) TAN	Elinyesia Sumbi
—	FW	(Tanzania) TAN	Eliuter Mpepo
—	FW	(Ghana) GHA	Hans Kwofie
—	FW	(Ivory Coast) CIV	Benedict Jr
—	FW	(Tanzania) TAN	Geoffrey Mwashiuya
—	FW	(Tanzania) TAN	Frank Zakaria
—	FW	(Tanzania) TAN	Mohamed Titi

== Technical bench ==
- Head coach: (Serbia) Dragan Popadic
- Assistant coach: Dusan Momcilovi

=== Managers ===
- Dragan Popadic (2019–present)
- Hemed Seleman Ally 'Morocco' (2018–2019)
- Hans van der Pluijm (2017–2018)
