= Mbao F.C. =

Mbao FC
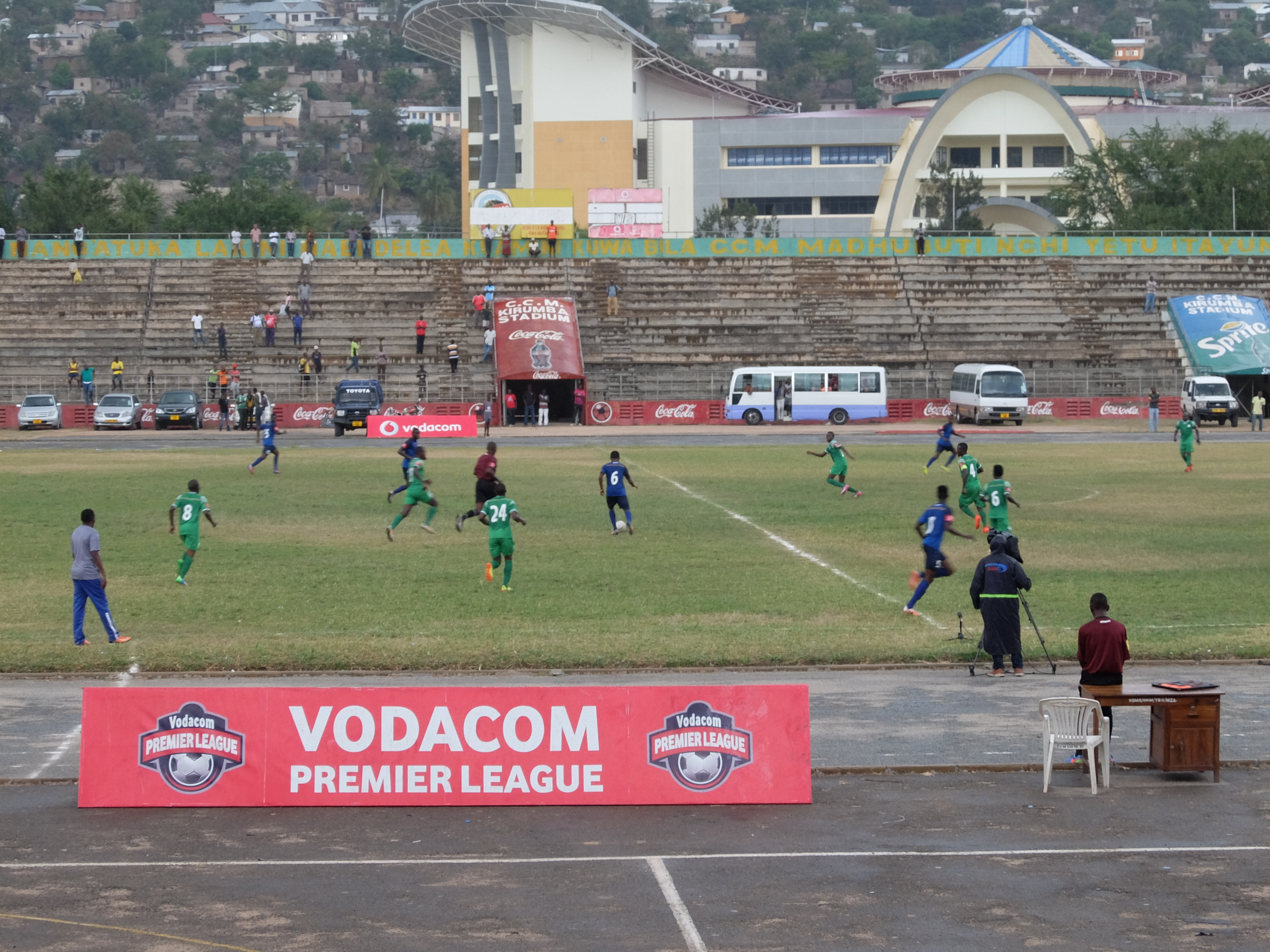
- Vodacom Premier League match between Mbao FC and Kagera Sugar, played at CCM Kirumba Stadium in Mwanza on November 3rd, 2016. Mbao FC are in blue.
- Full name: Mbao Football club
- Nickname: Scred Fred
- Founded: 2005
- Ground: CCM Kirumba Stadium, Kitangiri Mwanza, Tanzania
- Capacity: 35,000
- Chairman: Solly Zephania Njashi
- Manager: Amri Said
- League: Tanzanian Premier League

Mbao FC is a football club from Mwanza, Tanzania. 'Mbao' is the Swahili word for 'wood'.

== History ==
=== 2015/2016 ===
They were promoted to the Tanzanian Premier League after the 2015/2016 season. This promotion came after a match-fixing scandal led to the relegation of other teams.

=== 2016/2017 ===
In the 2016/2017 season, they were one of two teams from Mwanza competing in the Premier League, the other being Toto African.

=== 2017 ===
In May 2017, Mbao FC played the final of the Azam Sports Federation Cup, against Simba Sports Club. Simba won the game 2–1 in extra time.

They play their home games at CCM Kirumba Stadium.

=== 2019/20 ===
Mbao FC were relegated to the second division after losing a relegation playoff match to Ihefu SC.
