= Ashanti United S.C. =

Ashanti United
- Full name: Ashanti United Sports Club
- Stadium: Chamazi Stadium
- Capacity: 10,000
- League: Tanzanian First Division League

Ashanti United SC is a football club in Dar es Salaam, Tanzania.

They play in the second level of Tanzanian professional football, the Tanzanian First Division League, They played in the Tanzanian Premier League in the 2014/15 season. 10,000-capacity Chamazi Stadium is their home stadium.

== Current squad ==
Note: Flags indicate national team as defined under FIFA eligibility rules; some limited exceptions apply. Players may hold more than one non-FIFA nationality.

No.	Pos.	Nation	Player
—	GK	(Tanzania) TAN	Maneno Uvuruge
—	DF	(Tanzania) TAN	Himili Tale
—	DF	(Tanzania) TAN	Jum Jabu
—	DF	(Tanzania) TAN	Shaban Ibrahim
—	DF	(Tanzania) TAN	John Mabula
—	MF	(Tanzania) TAN	Menard Mgaya

No.	Pos.	Nation	Player
—	MF	(Tanzania) TAN	Omar Wahabi
—	MF	(Tanzania) TAN	Hashim Kaongo
—	MF	(Tanzania) TAN	Bakari Kigodeko
—	FW	(Tanzania) TAN	Adam Kingwande
—	FW	(Tanzania) TAN	Raphael Kiava
