= Ndanda F.C. =

Ndanda S.C.
- Full name: Ndanda S.C. Arusha
- Nickname: The Blacks
- Founded: 17 January 2011
- Ground: Nangwanda Sijaona Stadium Mtwara, Tanzania
- Capacity: 15,000
- Chairman: Saidi Limbega
- Manager: Ngawina Ngawina
- League: Championship
- Website: https://www.tzchampionship.com/leagues/50540/teams/244142

Ndanda Sports Club is a professional football club based in the city of Mtwara, Tanzania. They compete in the Championship, the second tier of league football in Tanzania.

== History ==
Ndanda S.C. was founded in the Ndanda Masasi District in Mtwara region in 2011 but is currently based in Mtwara town district in Mtwara region south of Tanzania country. They played in the Premier from 2014 to 2020.

Home games are being played at the Nangwanda Sijaona Stadium in Mtwara.

== Management and staff ==
Management and staff as of 5 February 2022
| Position | Name |
|---|---|
| Head coach | (Tanzania) Ngawina Ngawina |
| Assistant coach | (Tanzania) Shawesi Nawanda |
| Manager | (Tanzania) Rashid Chuma |
| Team Doctor | (Tanzania) Twaha Mnari |
| Goalkeeper Coach | (Tanzania) Juma Bukoli |
| Kit Manager | (Tanzania) Hassan Rashid |

== Squad ==
As of 17 September 2022

Note: Flags indicate national team as defined under FIFA eligibility rules; some limited exceptions apply. Players may hold more than one non-FIFA nationality.

| No. | Pos. | Nation | Player |
|---|---|---|---|
| 1 | FWGK | TAN | Castor Aureus Mhagama |
| 12 | DF | TAN | Shomari Said Almas |
| 6 | DF | TAN | Pascal John Kibandula |
| 33 | DF | TAN | Hamisi Hassan Ibrahim |
| 25 | DF | TAN | Geofrey Rafael Kuwanza |
| 27 | MF | TAN | Morice Malaki Kaniki |
| 8 | MF | TAN | Muksin Hassan Mustafa |
| 43 | MF | TAN | Salum Mkana Mwango |
| 7 | MF | TAN | Selemani Rajabu Kibuta |
| 2 | FW | TAN | Adam Rashid Uled |

| No. | Pos. | Nation | Player |
|---|---|---|---|
| 13 | FW | TAN | Kombo Ramadhani Ali |
| 30 | GK | TAN | Samwel Edward Brazio |
| 26 | DF | TAN | Abdulrazaki Salumu Hamisi |
| 20 | DF | TAN | Ally Mohamedi Seleman |
| 5 | DF | TAN | Samweli matayo mkomola |
| 4 | MF | TAN | Nelson Noah Haule |
| 44 | MF | TAN | Peter Paska Pasto |
| 23 | MF | TAN | Aston Gaston Emanuel |
| 17 | FW | TAN | Herman Charles Masenga |
| 21 | FW | TAN | Dennis Richard Tamba |
