= Kahama United =

Kahama United is a Tanzanian football club based in Shinyanga. Their home games are played at Kambarage Stadium.
