= African Sports =

Tanzanian football club

African Sports Club
- Full name: African Sports Club
- Founded: 1936; 90 years ago
- Ground: Mkwakwani Stadium
- League: Tanzanian Championship League
- 2024–25: Tanzanian Championship League, 13th of 16
- Website: https://www.tzchampionship.com/leagues/50540/teams/244149
Home colours

African Sports Club is a football club based in the city of Tanga, Tanzania. They competed in the 2015/2016 Tanzanian Premier League, the highest tier of league football in Tanzania.

Home games are played at the Mkwakwani Stadium.

== Honours ==
- Tanzanian Premier League
  - Champions (1): 1988
