= Arusha F.C. =

Football club based in Arusha City, Tanzania

Arusha City FC
- Full name: Arusha City Football Club
- Ground: Sheikh Amri Abeid Memorial Stadium
- Capacity: 20,000
- League: Tanzanian Second Division League

Arusha City F.C. is a Tanzanian football club from Arusha. Its home games are played at Sheikh Amri Abeid Memorial Stadium. The team played in the Tanzanian Premier League in 2007, but was relegated at the end of the season to the second level and played in the Tanzanian Second Division League, the third tier.

Arusha FC returned to the Tanzanian Premier League for the 2010/11 season only to be once again relegated to the Second Division League. In 2023, the city is scheduled to host the regional football league in September.

Arusha also participated in the 2022 edition of the Super Cup final against Nyota FC. Tusker FC also traveled to Arusha for pre-season friendlies in 2023.
