= JKT Oljoro F.C. =

Football club based in Arusha Rural District, Arusha Region, Tanzania

Oljoro JKT FC
- Full name: Oljoro JKT FC
- Ground: Sheikh Amri Abeid Memorial Stadium; Arusha, Tanzania
- Capacity: 20,000
- League: Tanzanian First Division League

JKT Oljoro FC is a Tanzanian football club from Arusha that previously played in the Tanzanian Premier League. In the 2015/16 season they are playing in the Tanzanian First Division League. They play their home matches at the Sheikh Amri Abeid Memorial Stadium in Arusha, Tanzania. Promoted to the Tanzanian Premier League after the 2010/11 season, they finished the 2011/12 season in 6th position playing 26 matches, winning 9, drawing 8 and losing 9, scoring 19, conceding 24 with a goal difference of −5 and 35 points.

On October 9, 2013, JKT Oljoro drew 2–2 with Ruvu Shooting in the Tanzania Mainland Premier League.

== Current squad ==
Note: Flags indicate national team as defined under FIFA eligibility rules; some limited exceptions apply. Players may hold more than one non-FIFA nationality.

No.	Pos.	Nation	Player
—			Ibrahim Mamba
—			Sixtbert Mohamed
—			Navo Sanane

No.	Pos.	Nation	Player
—			Salim Mbonde
—			Markus Rafael
