= Tanga, Tanzania =

Capital of Tanga Region, Tanzania

Tanga Jiji la Tanga (Swahili)
- Capital of Tanga Region
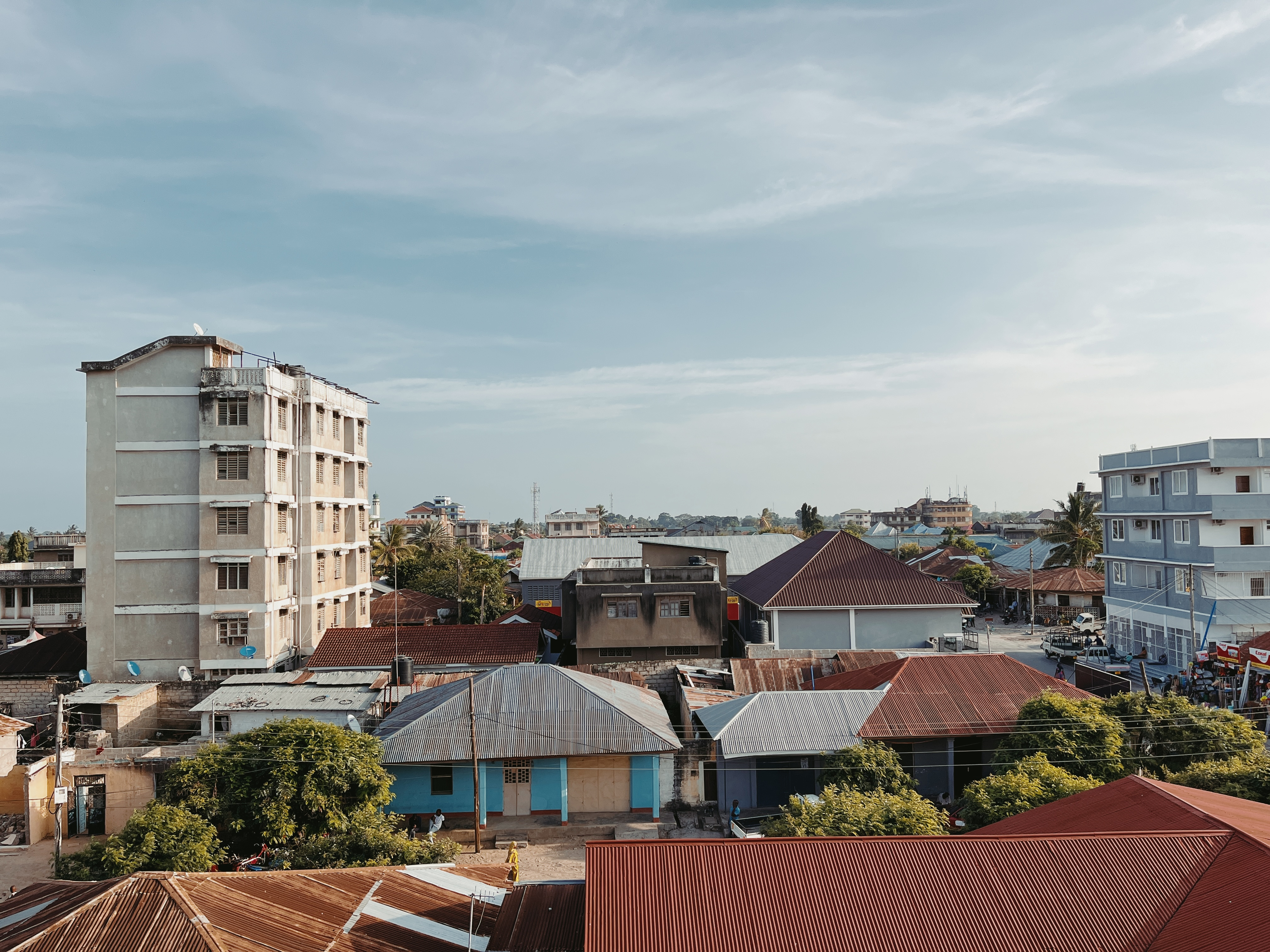
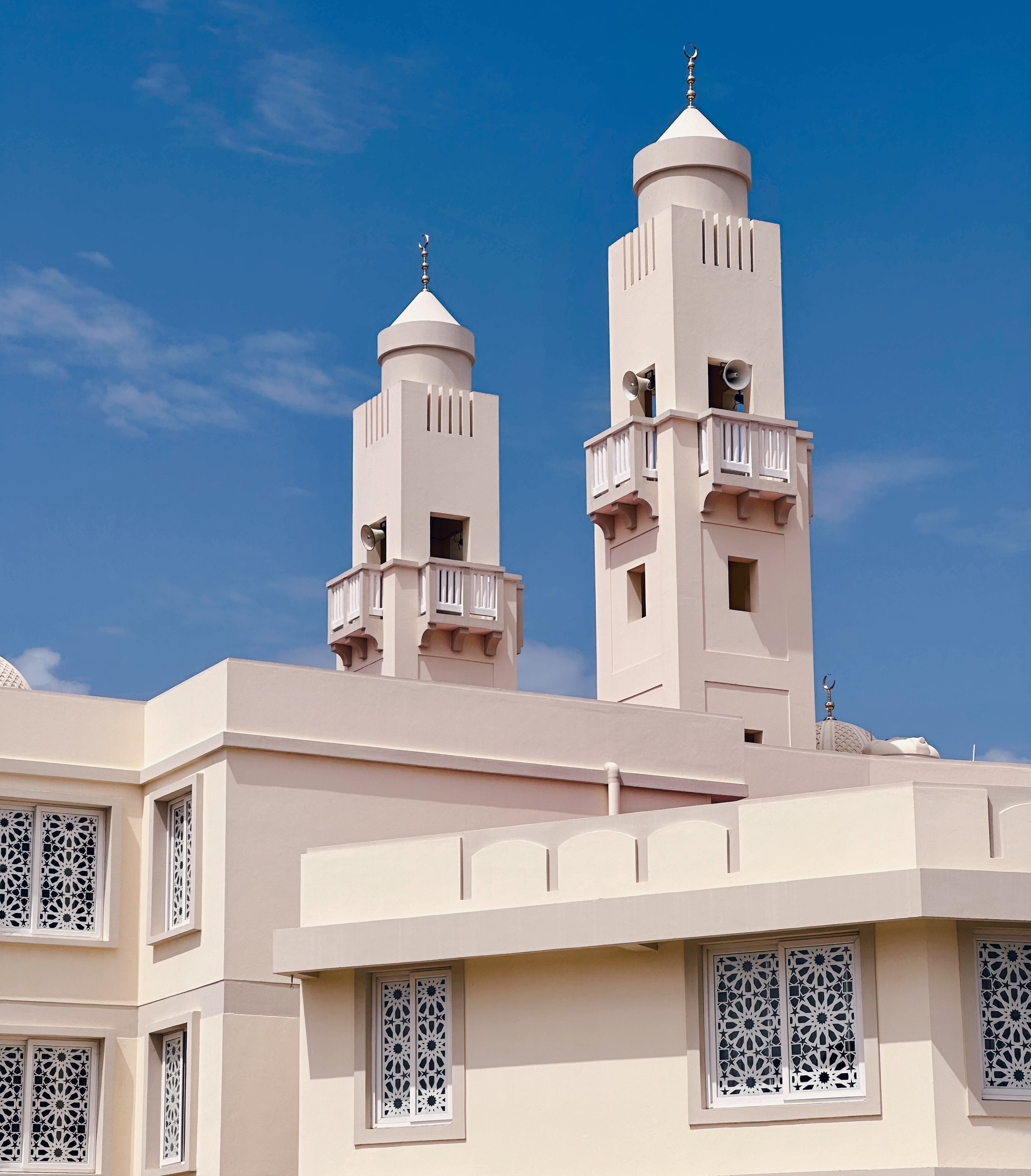
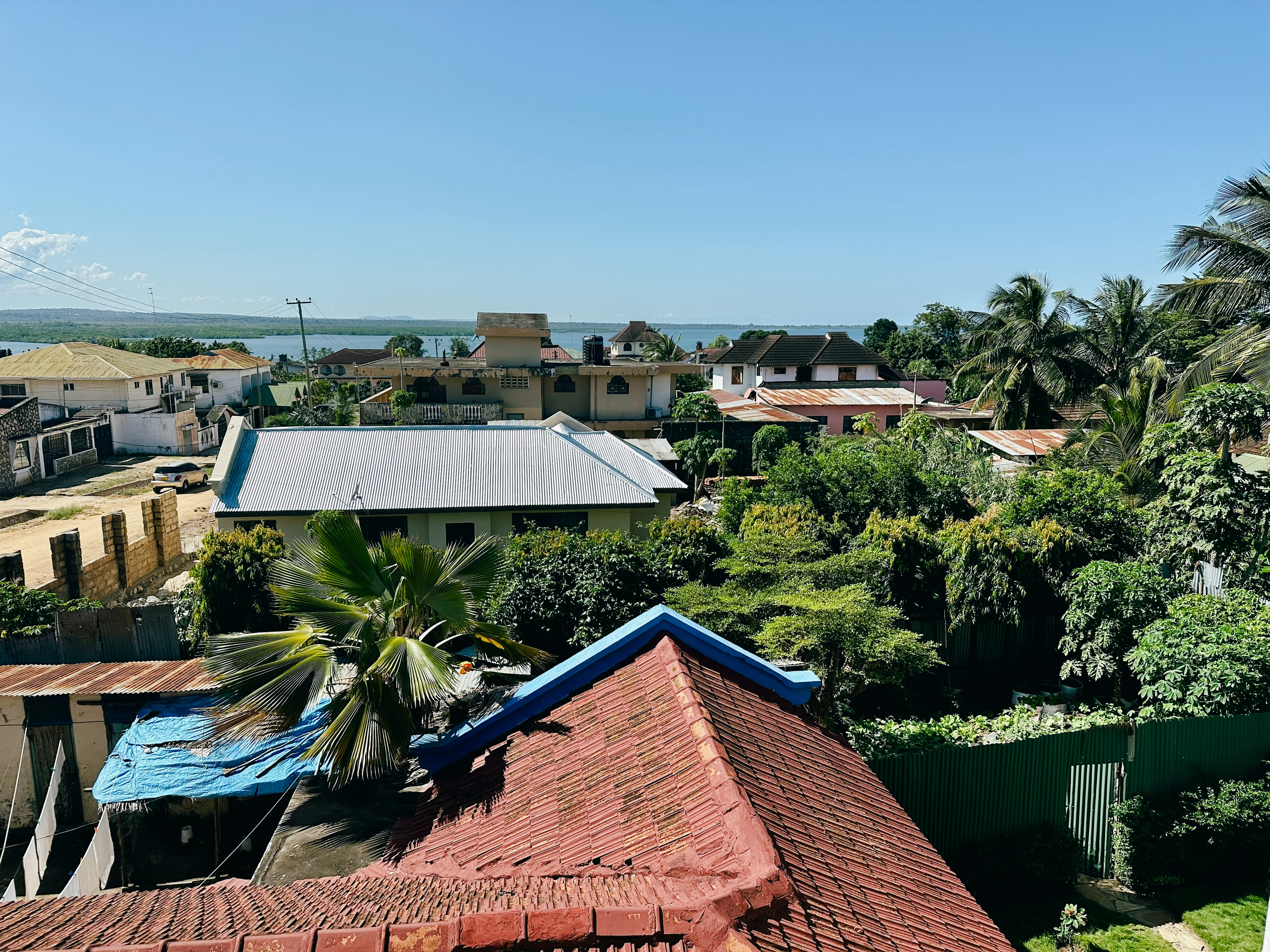
- From top to bottom: Tanga city scape, Mosque in Makorora & Suburban Chumbageni ward

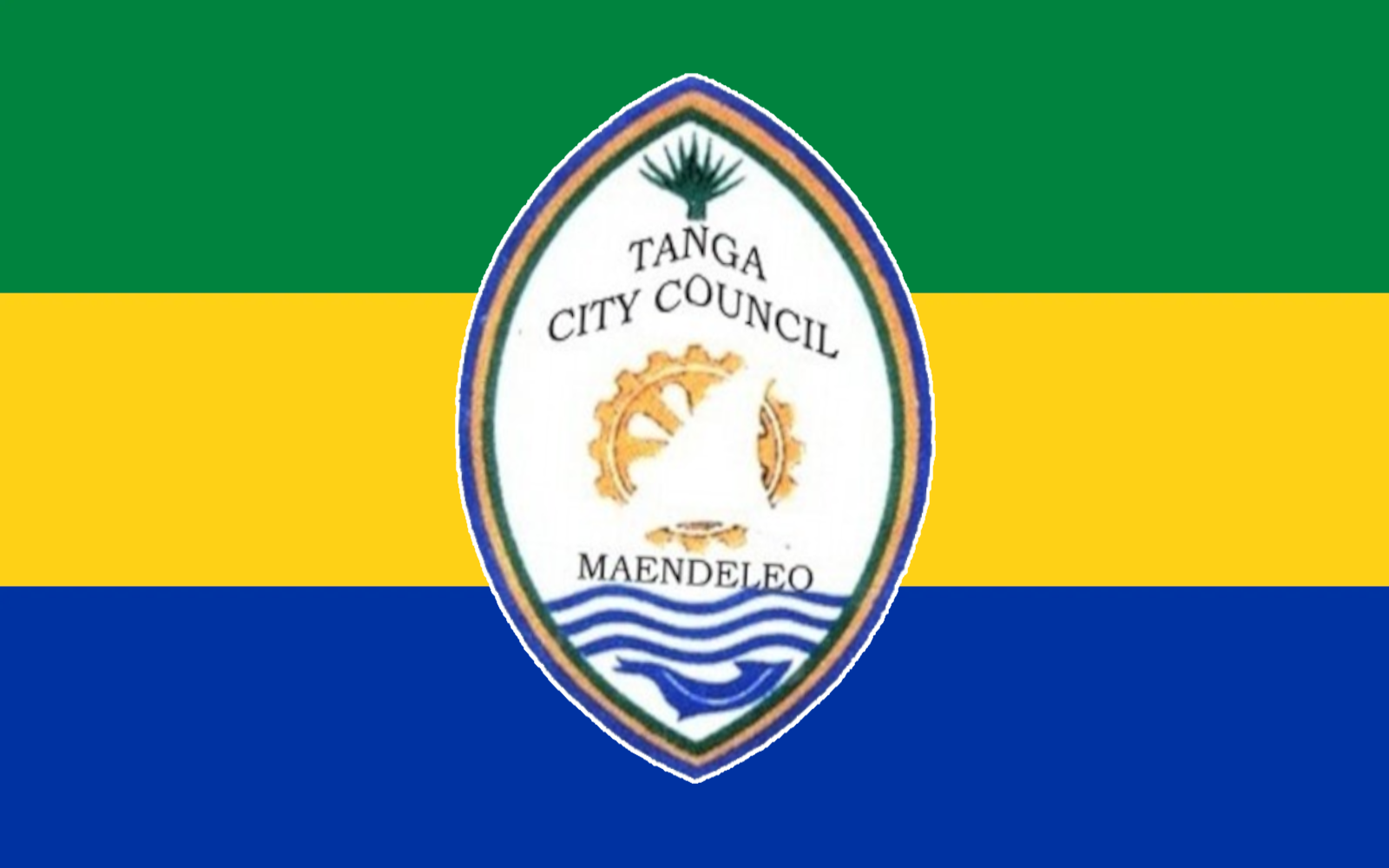
- Flag
- Nickname: Tanga raha
- Location within Tanzania
- Coordinates: 5°04′27″S 39°05′57″E
- Country: Tanzania
- Region: Tanga Region
- District: Tanga District
- Incorporated Town: 1891^{1}
- Incorporated City: 1 July 2005

Government
  - Type: City Council
  - Mayor: Omari Guledi

Population (2022)
  - Total: 393,429

Ethnic groups
  - Settler: Swahili
  - Ancestral: Digo
- ^{1}The Germans designated Tanga a township after taking control of the coastal area from the Sultan of Zanzibar in April 1891.

Tanga (Jiji la Tanga, in Swahili) is a historic city and the capital of Tanga Region. The city is located in the northern port city of Tanzania to the west of the Indian Ocean on Tanga Bay. The city had a population of 393,429 in 2022 and is governed by the Tanga City Council. The city is also a home to the Port of Tanga. The name Tanga means "sail" in Swahili. The city is also the capital of Tanga District.

== Geography ==
=== Climate ===
Due to close proximity to the equator and the warm Indian Ocean, the city experiences tropical climatic conditions similar to all Tanzanian coastal cities. The city experiences hot and humid weather throughout much of the year and has a tropical wet and dry climate (Köppen: Aw). Annual rainfall is approximately 1,290 mm (51 in), and in a normal year there are two rainy seasons: "the long rains" in April and May and "the short rains" in November and December.

Climate data for Tanga (1971–2000)
Month	Jan	Feb	Mar	Apr	May	Jun	Jul	Aug	Sep	Oct	Nov	Dec	Year
Mean daily maximum °C (°F)	32.3 (90.1)	32.8 (91.0)	33.0 (91.4)	31.2 (88.2)	29.9 (85.8)	29.3 (84.7)	28.7 (83.7)	28.6 (83.5)	29.2 (84.6)	30.1 (86.2)	31.2 (88.2)	31.9 (89.4)	30.7 (87.2)
Mean daily minimum °C (°F)	23.5 (74.3)	23.6 (74.5)	23.8 (74.8)	23.4 (74.1)	22.4 (72.3)	21.0 (69.8)	20.1 (68.2)	19.8 (67.6)	20.2 (68.4)	21.3 (70.3)	22.4 (72.3)	23.1 (73.6)	22.1 (71.7)
Average rainfall mm (inches)	35.0 (1.38)	27.8 (1.09)	108.1 (4.26)	243.1 (9.57)	290.9 (11.45)	86.0 (3.39)	58.9 (2.32)	69.6 (2.74)	73.2 (2.88)	115.8 (4.56)	134.1 (5.28)	86.3 (3.40)	1,328.8 (52.32)
Average rainy days (≥ 1 mm)	3	2	8	14	15	8	9	9	10	9	11	8	106
Source: World Meteorological Organization

== Economy ==
Major exports from the port of Tanga include sisal, coffee, tea, and cotton. Tanga is also an important railroad terminus, connecting much of the northern Tanzanian interior with the sea via the Tanzania Railways Corporation's Link Line and Central Line. Tanga is linked to the African Great Lakes region and the Tanzanian economic capital of Dar es Salaam. The city is served by Tanga Airport. The harbour and surrounding is the centre of life in Tanga. It has several markets in several neighbourhoods. Tanga Cement is one of the major industries.

=== Infrastructure ===
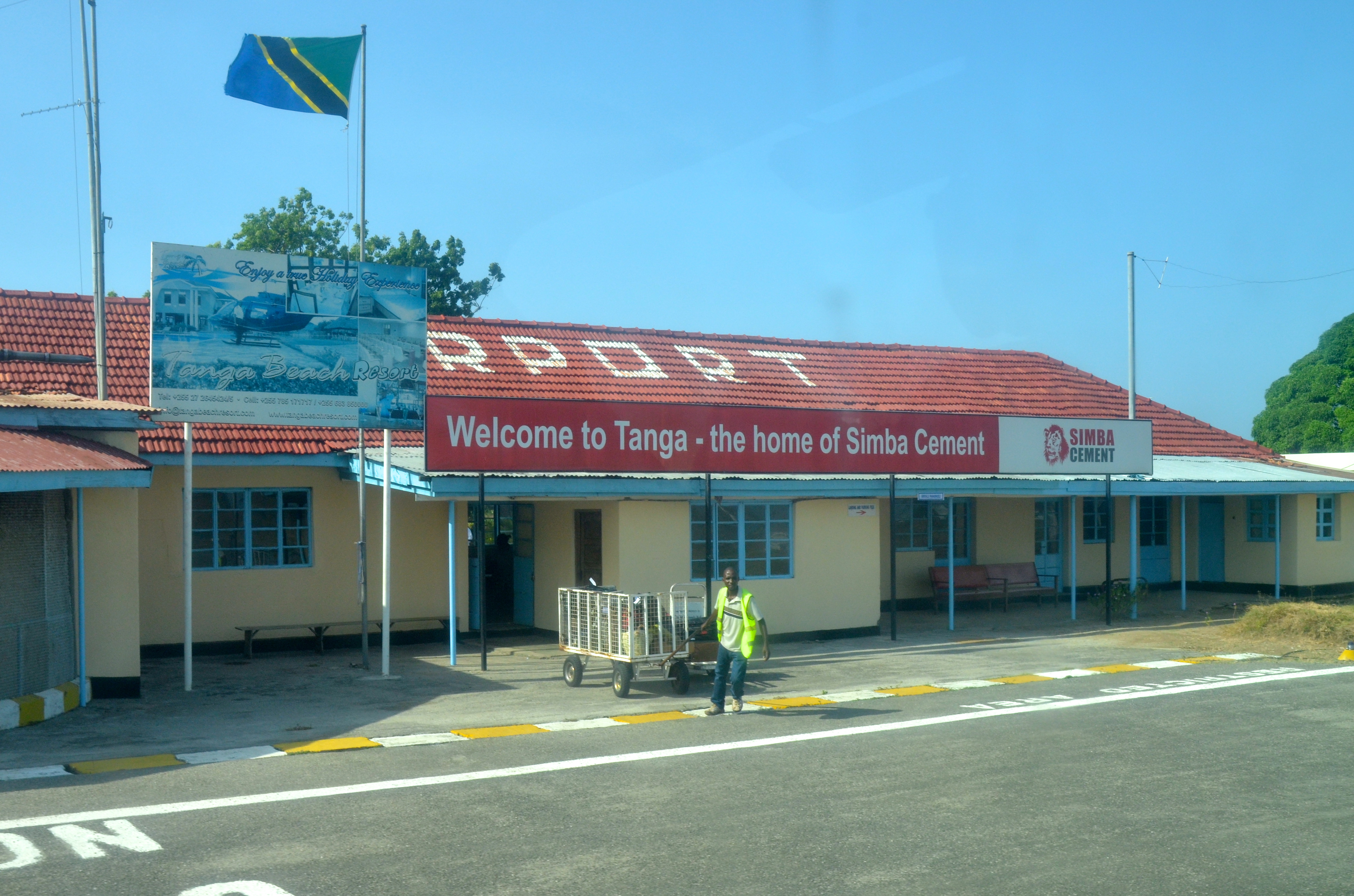
The Tanga airport arrivals lounge.

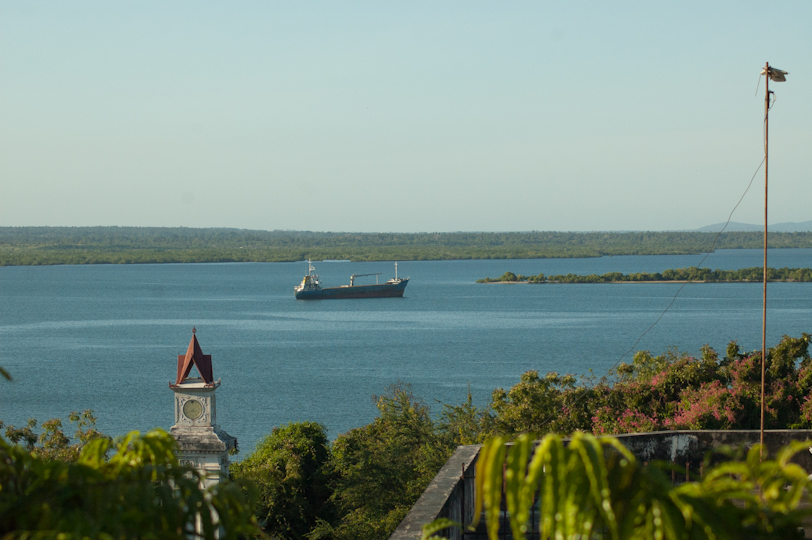
A ship anchored in the Tanga Bay.

==== Air connectivity ====
Tanga has a small airport and is currently served by only three regional airlines, providing scheduled services to Dar es Salaam, Pemba Island and Zanzibar. In 2014 the airport served less than 30,000 passengers. There are also a small number of private airstrips in the surrounding area around the city that facilitate the private estates and surrounding industries.

==== Road connectivity ====
Tanga city lies approximately 250 km from Chalinze on the A14 highway that runs from Chalinze to Mombasa. The town is 75 km away from Segera which is a junction linking the A14 and the B1. The B1 highway is a bypass that links Moshi and the northern corridor to Tanga.

==== Port of Tanga ====
The port is historically the oldest operating harbour in the nation and its roots date back to around the 6th century. The Port of Tanga is the second largest port in Tanzania and is a vital part to the city's initial development and economy. The port operates at 90% of its installed capacity and its main cargo is coal for the cement industry and is a new gateway for crude oil products. The ports authority has major plans to upgrade the port in increasing its capacity and providing an alternative route for cargo flowing into the country.

==== Rail connectivity ====
Tanga is the starting point of the narrow gauge northern railway network that ends in Arusha. Construction of this line was started in the 19th century by the Germans. In 2018, the Government of Tanzania invested 5.7 billion Tanzanian Shillings to rehabilitate the line. As of July 2019, diesel-powered cargo trains are serving Tanga Railway Station again and passenger transport between Tanga and Arusha was set to start in September 2019.

=== Energy ===
The East African Crude Oil Pipeline (EACOP), a major infrastructure project transporting crude oil from Uganda’s oil fields to the Indian Ocean, terminates at the Chongoleani area near Tanga. The project includes the construction of a marine export terminal, storage facilities, and a jetty at Tanga Port.

== History ==
=== Early history ===
The first communities that called Tanga their home were the Digo people and the Swahili states of the 11th to 16th Centuries. However, the earliest documentation about Tanga comes from the Portuguese. During their disruption of the previous trading links Tanga settlement remained a small trading post for the colonists during their occupation of the East African coast for 200 years between 1500 and 1700 when they were ousted. The Sultanate of Oman battled the Portuguese and gained control of the settlement by mid-1700 along with Mombasa, Pemba Island and Kilwa Kisiwani. The town continued to act as a trading port for ivory and slaves under the sultan's rule. Tanga continued to be a prosperous trading hub for slaves with the Arab world until 1873 when the European powers intervened in order to abolish the slave trade that was helping to maintain the Islamic elites.

=== Tanga under German East Africa ===
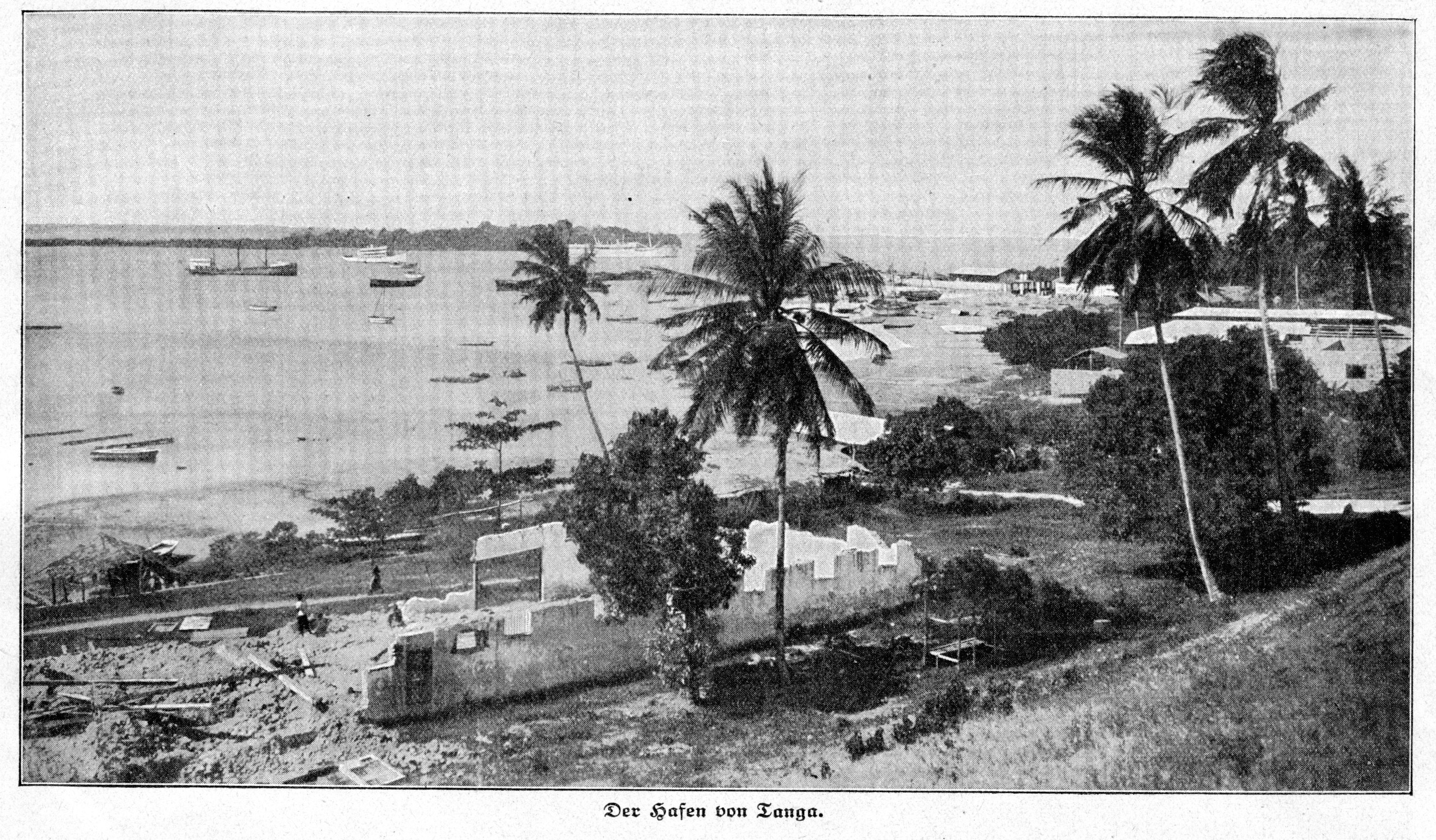
Der Hafen von Tanga um 1914. Illustrierte Geschichte des Weltkrieges 1914-15

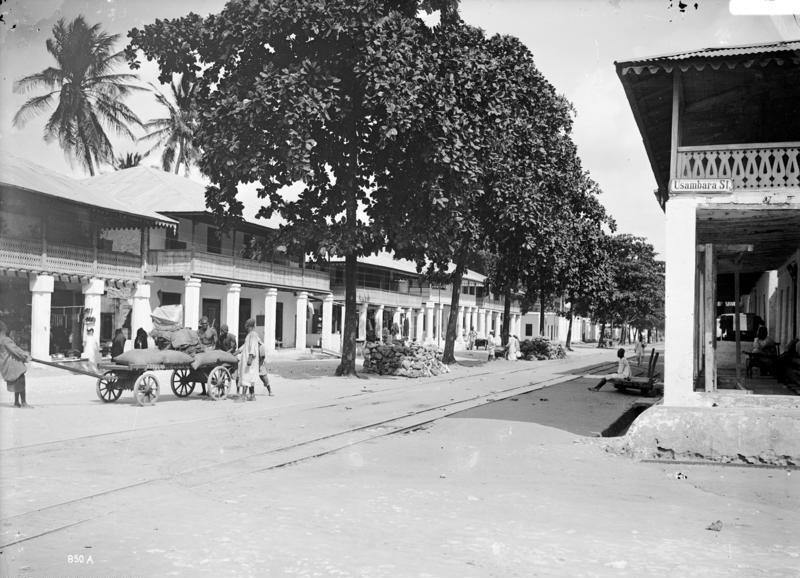
Usambara Street in Tanga between 1906 and 1918.

In the 19th Century, growing interests by Europeans for the Scramble for Africa brought the Germans to Tanga. The Germans bought the coastal strip of mainland Tanzania from the Sultan of Zanzibar in 1891. This takeover designated Tanga into a township and was the first establishment in German East Africa. The town became the centre of German colonial administration before the establishment of Dar es Salaam in the early 20th century.

Tanga was chosen in 1889 as a military post of German East Africa, and it became a district office in 1891. The town saw rapid expansion and planned growth under the German occupation. A tram line was built in the city for domestic transport and a port was also built for exports. In 1896 the construction of the Usambara Railway began and was extended to Moshi by 1912. Roads, bridges and the railway enabled industrial growth in the region and many buildings and bridges that are still in operation today in the town are from the German colonial period. The local economy was based mainly on the production of sisal, which had been brought to the colony several years earlier, and population in the area grew rapidly.

=== Tanga under British occupation ===
As the coastal town closest to British East Africa, Tanga was on the front line of the East African campaign at the beginning of World War I. On 4 November 1914 a landing by British and Empire forces was repelled in the Battle of Tanga. On 13 June 1916 the Royal Navy battleship HMS Vengeance and protected cruisers Challenger and Pioneer bombarded Tanga. On 7 July the protected cruiser HMS Talbot and monitor Severn entered Manza Bay and put troops ashore who occupied the town. After the War, Britain was given a League of Nations Mandate to prepare Tanganyika for independence and continued to develop Tanga in order to develop its agricultural potential, both to feed the population and so stave of the regular famines in the tetritory and for export. In 1919 Tanga was the country's fourth largest city, but at independence it was the second largest city after Dar es Salaam.

=== Post-independence ===
In the early stages of independence, the Port of Tanga continued to be a gateway for the export of sisal from the region. However, following the adopting of the Ujamaa policy, global prices in sisal dwindling, the production that served the city's factories closed and the city lost its main source of income. With the government controlling the agriculture trade and the depreciation in the world prices of sisal the port began to lose revenue.

== Healthcare ==
Tanga city medical institutions include:

- Bombo Regional Hospital
- National Institute of Medical Research Centre, Tanga
- Amani Biomedical Research Laboratory
- Tanga AIDS Working Group

== Tourist sites ==
Nearby tourist attractions include Amboni Caves, Galanos hot springs, Saadani national park, Toten Island, URITHI Tanga Museum, war graves and memorials, Tongoni Ruins, Ndumi Village defense works, Mwarongo sand beaches and protected coastal mangroves.

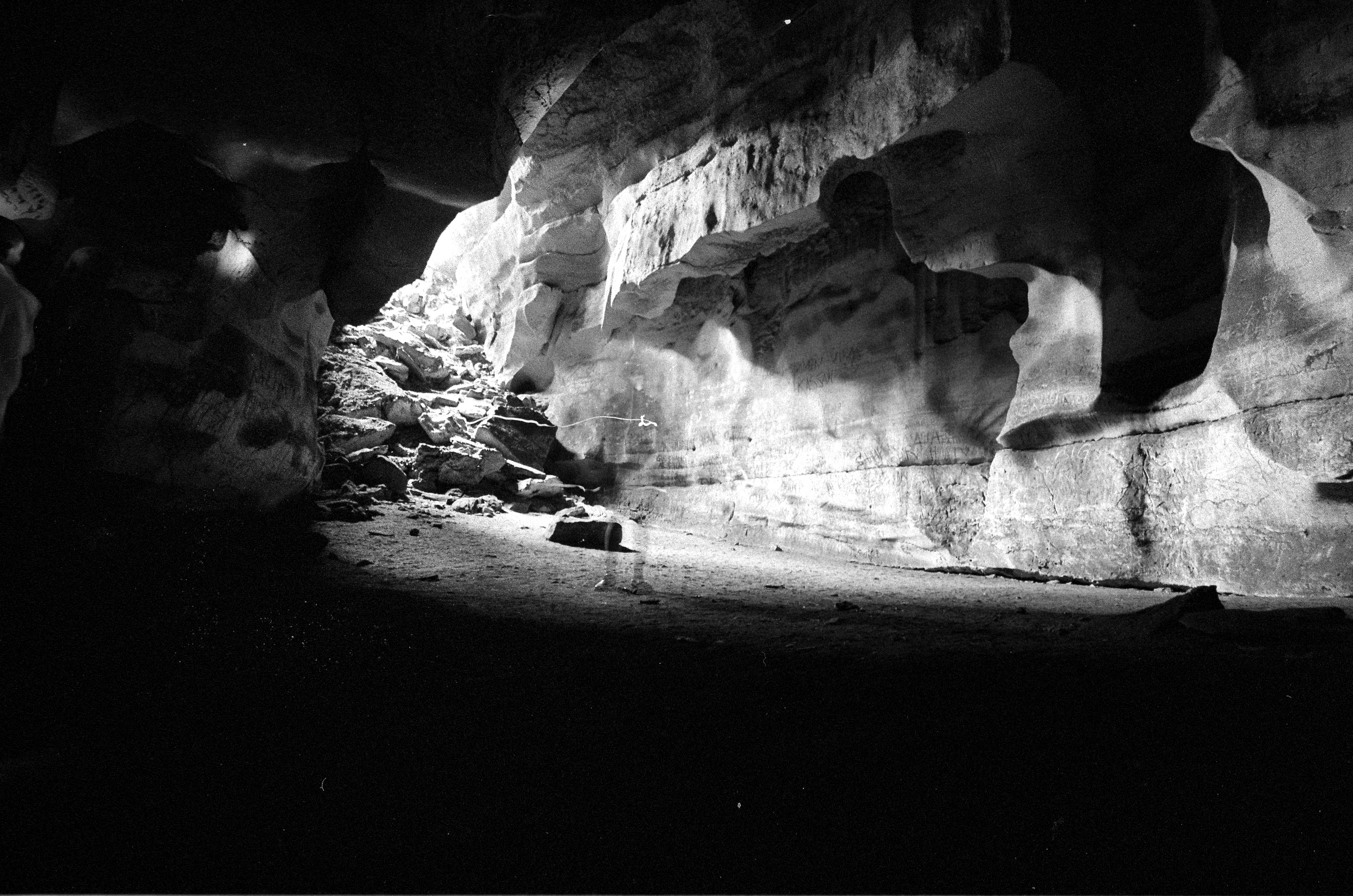
Amboni Caves

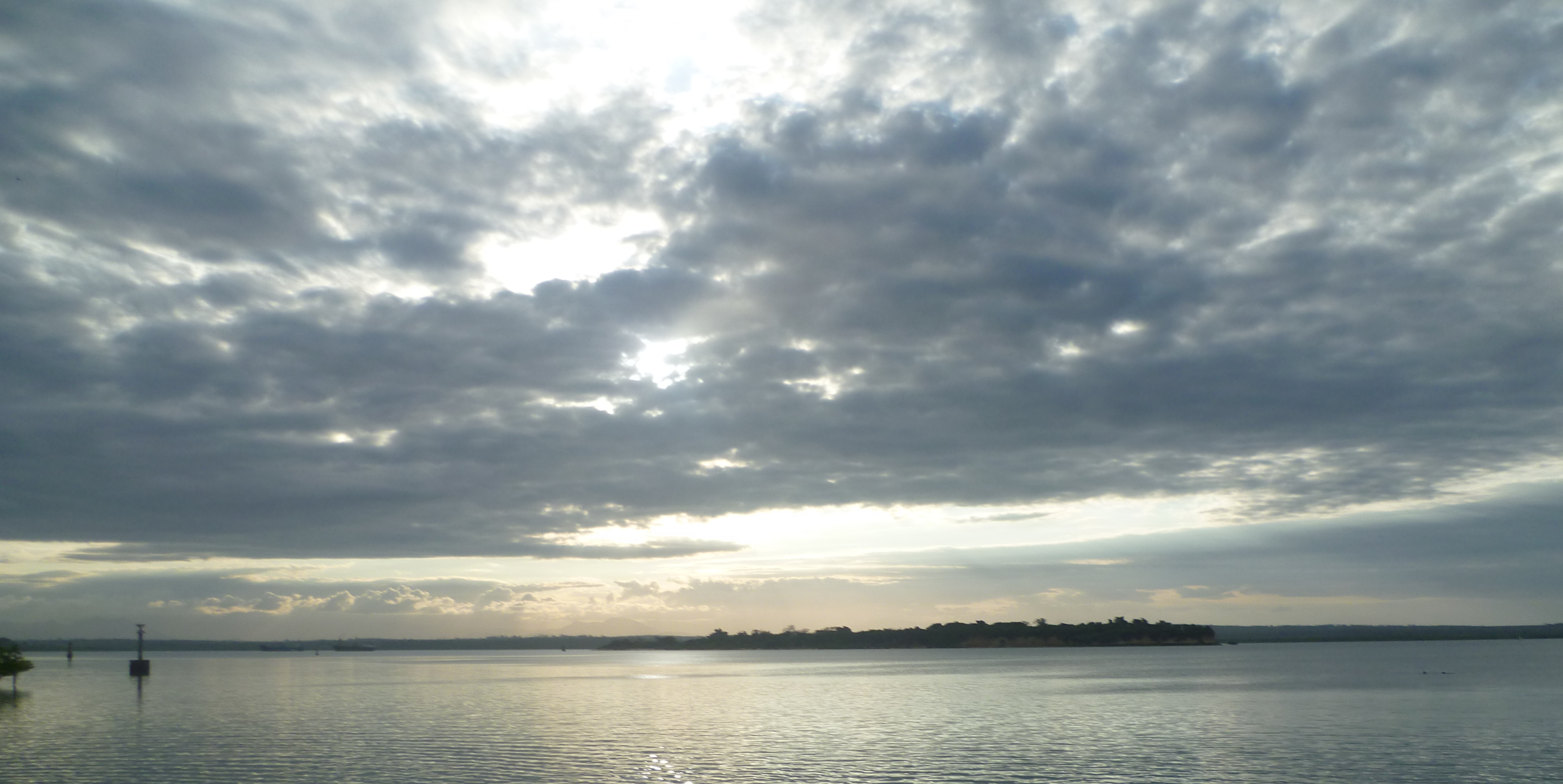
Toten Island

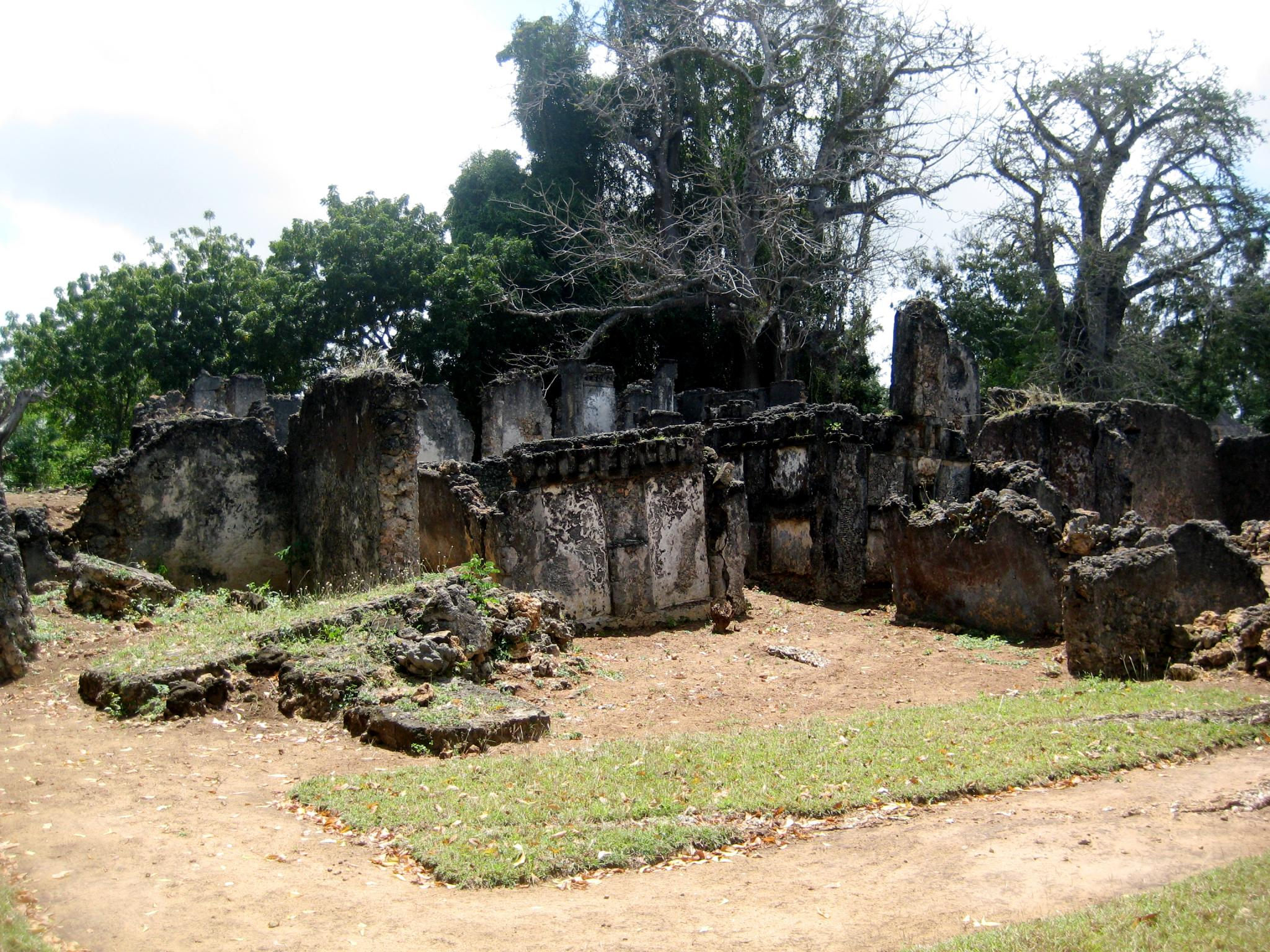
Tongoni Ruins

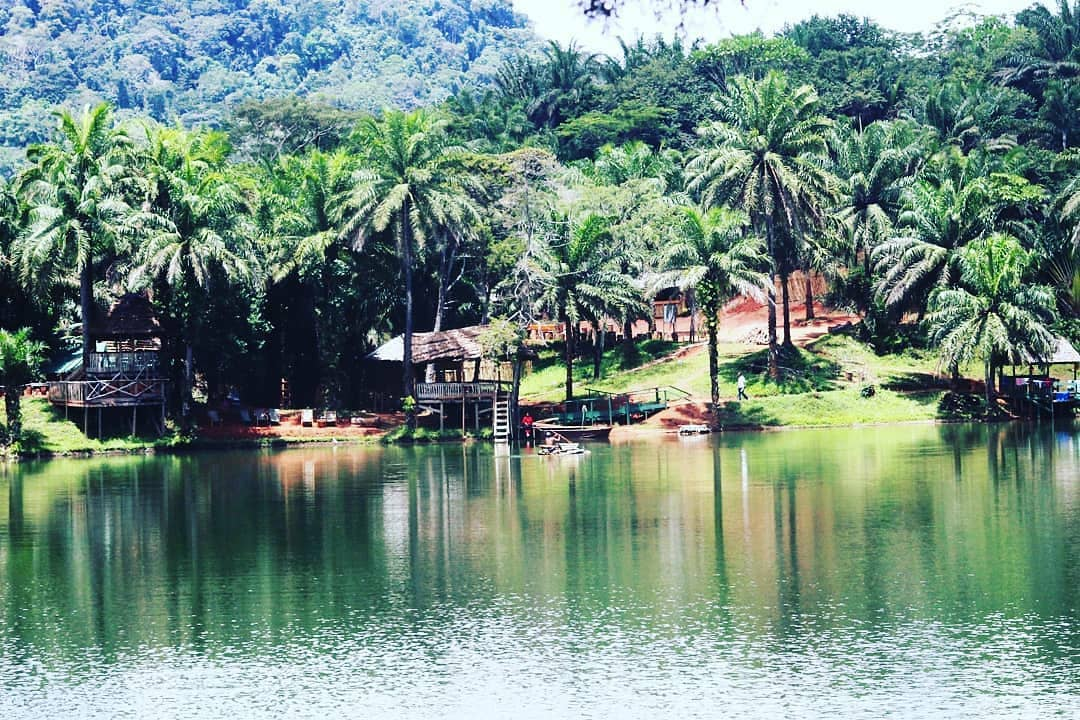
Magoroto lake near Tanga.

In recent years, the city has also developed eco-tourism attractions, including the Mangrove Boardwalk in the Sahare area, a raised wooden walkway through coastal mangrove forests that forms part of Tanzania’s expanding coastal tourism infrastructure.

== Sport ==
Football is the most popular sport in Tanga, and the city has historically been represented in the Tanzanian Premier League by clubs including Coastal Union, JKT Mgambo, and African Sports (Wana Kimanumanu). Matches are primarily hosted at Mkwakwani Stadium, a multi-purpose stadium in Tanga used for domestic league and cup matches.

== Twin towns – sister cities ==
Tanga is twinned with:

- Eckernförde, Germany (1963)
- Kemi, Finland (2007)
- Tifariti, Western Sahara
- Toledo, United States (2001)

== Gallery ==
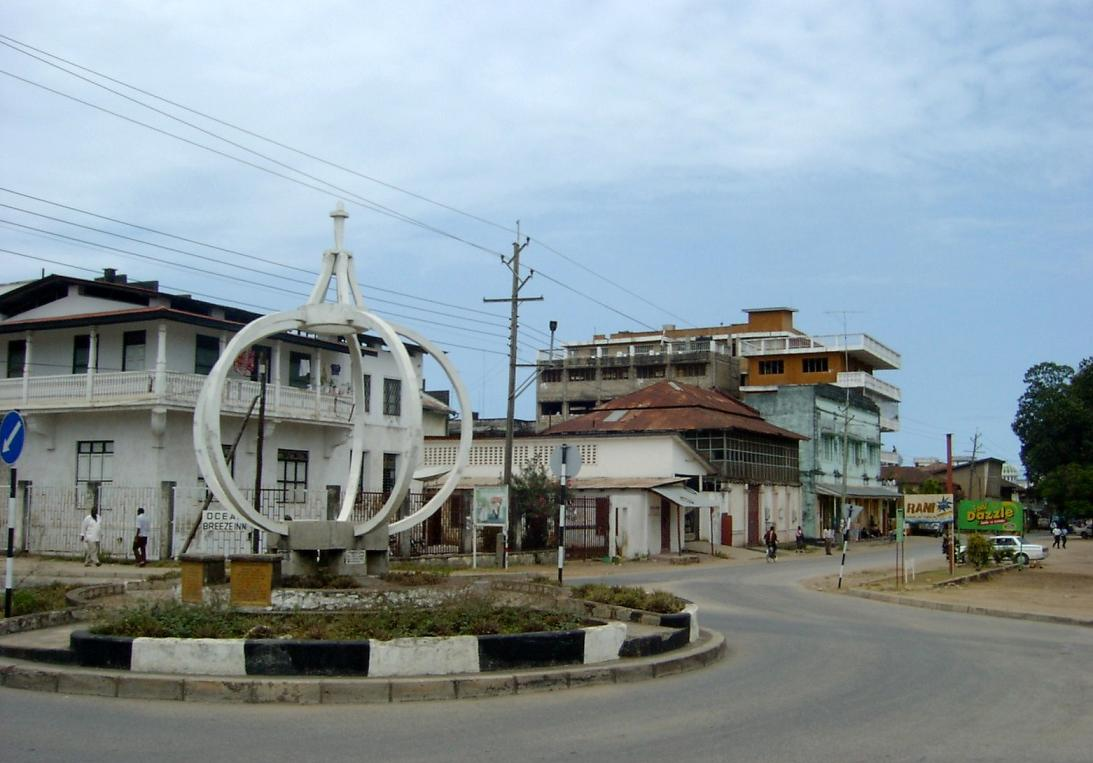
A roundabout in the city centre, 2003.

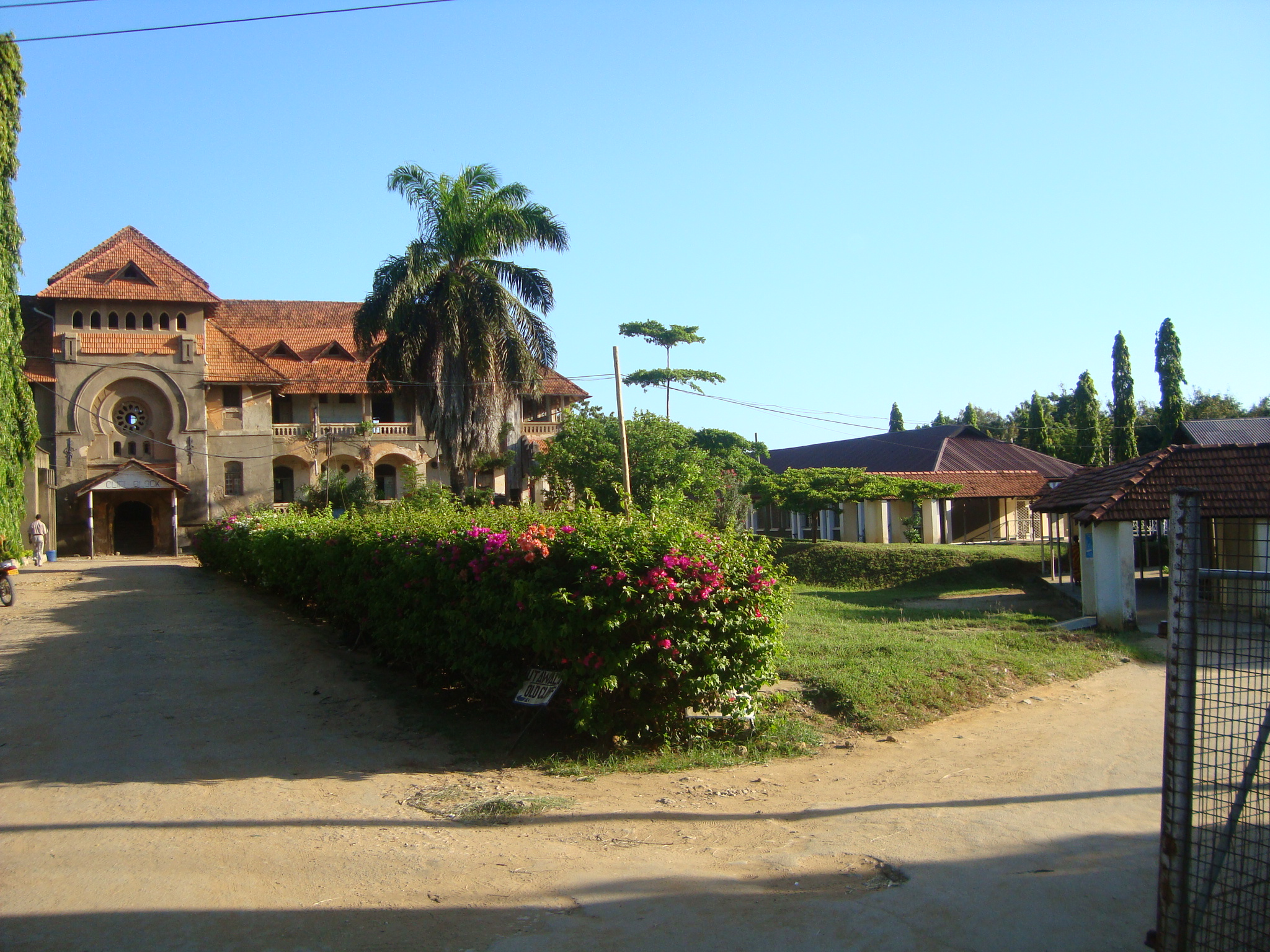
The German built cliff block at the Bombo Hospital.

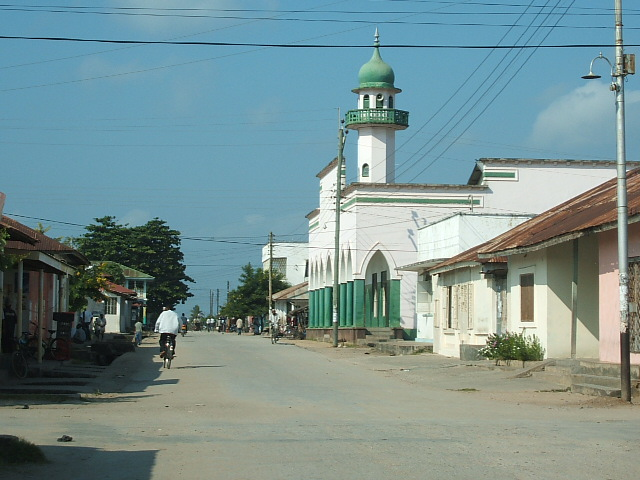
A mosque in Ngamiani.

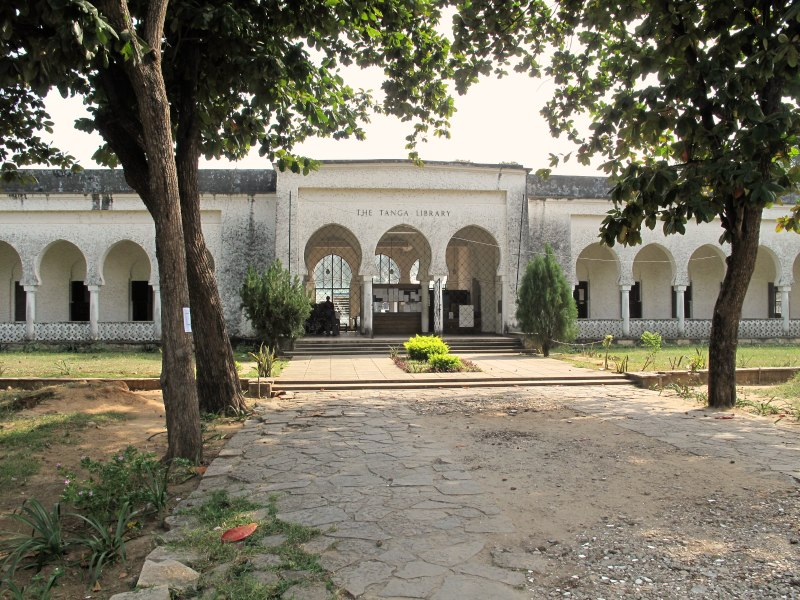
The Tanga Public Library.

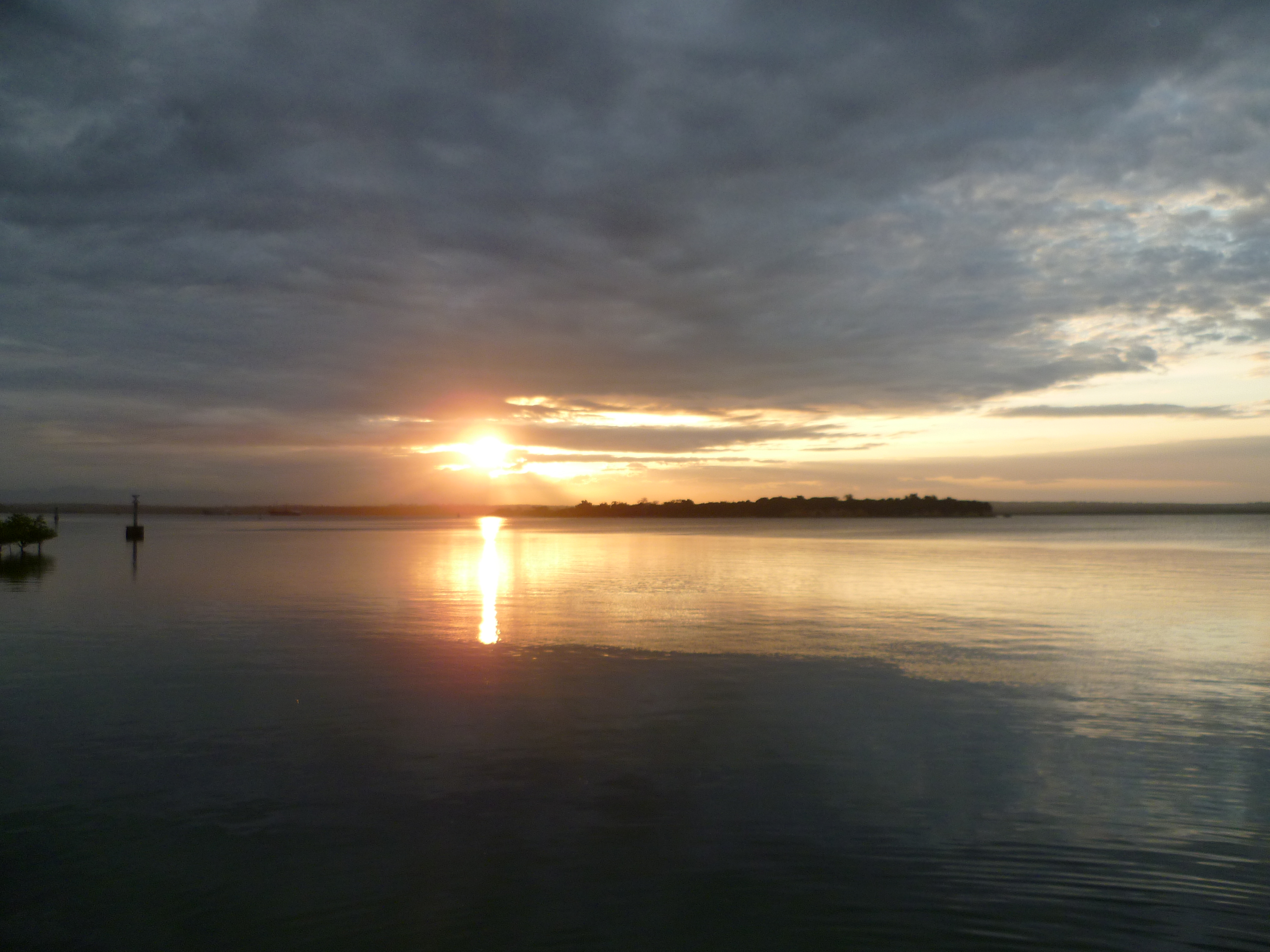
A sunset in Tanga Bay.

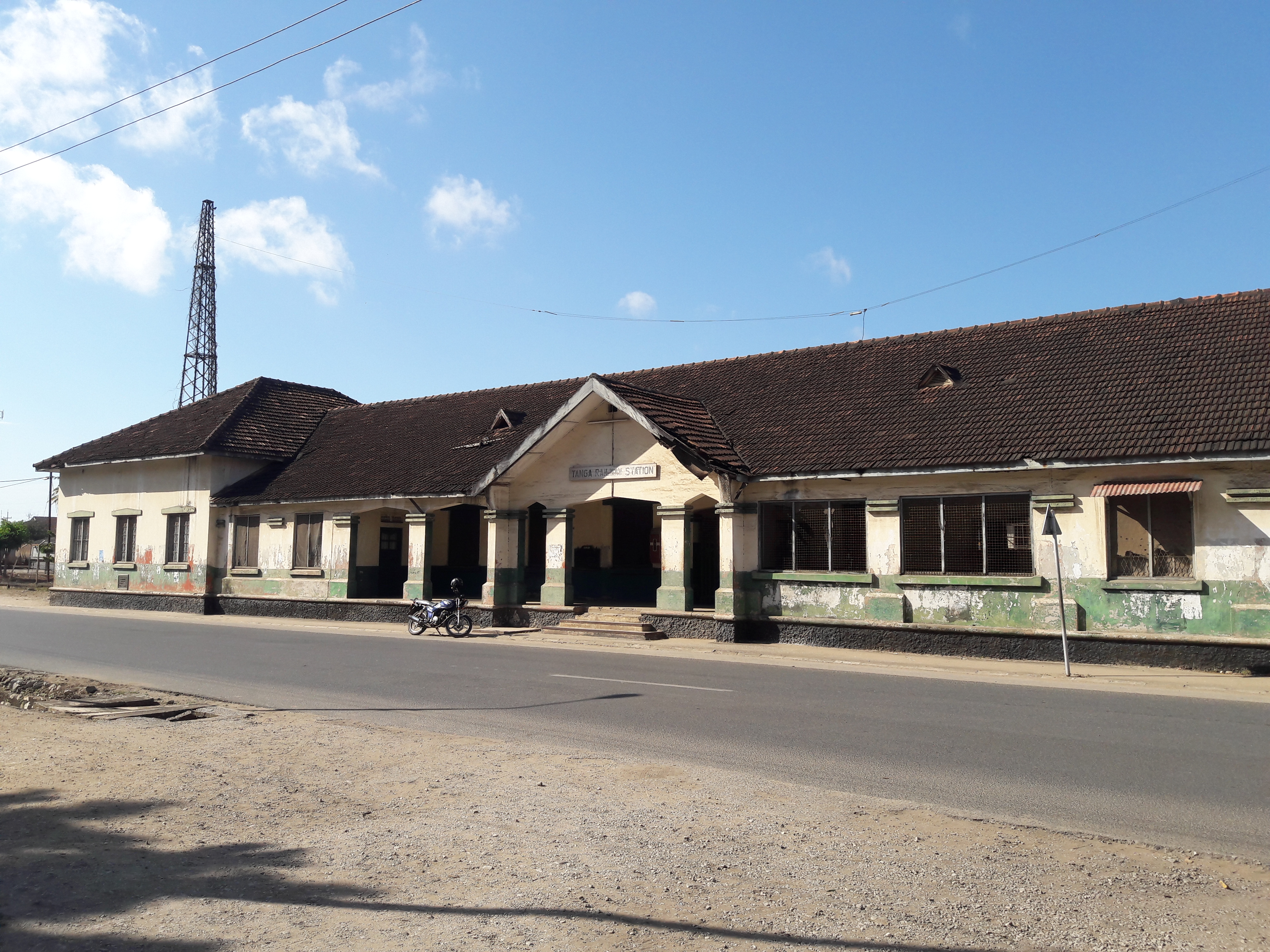
Tanga Railway Station.

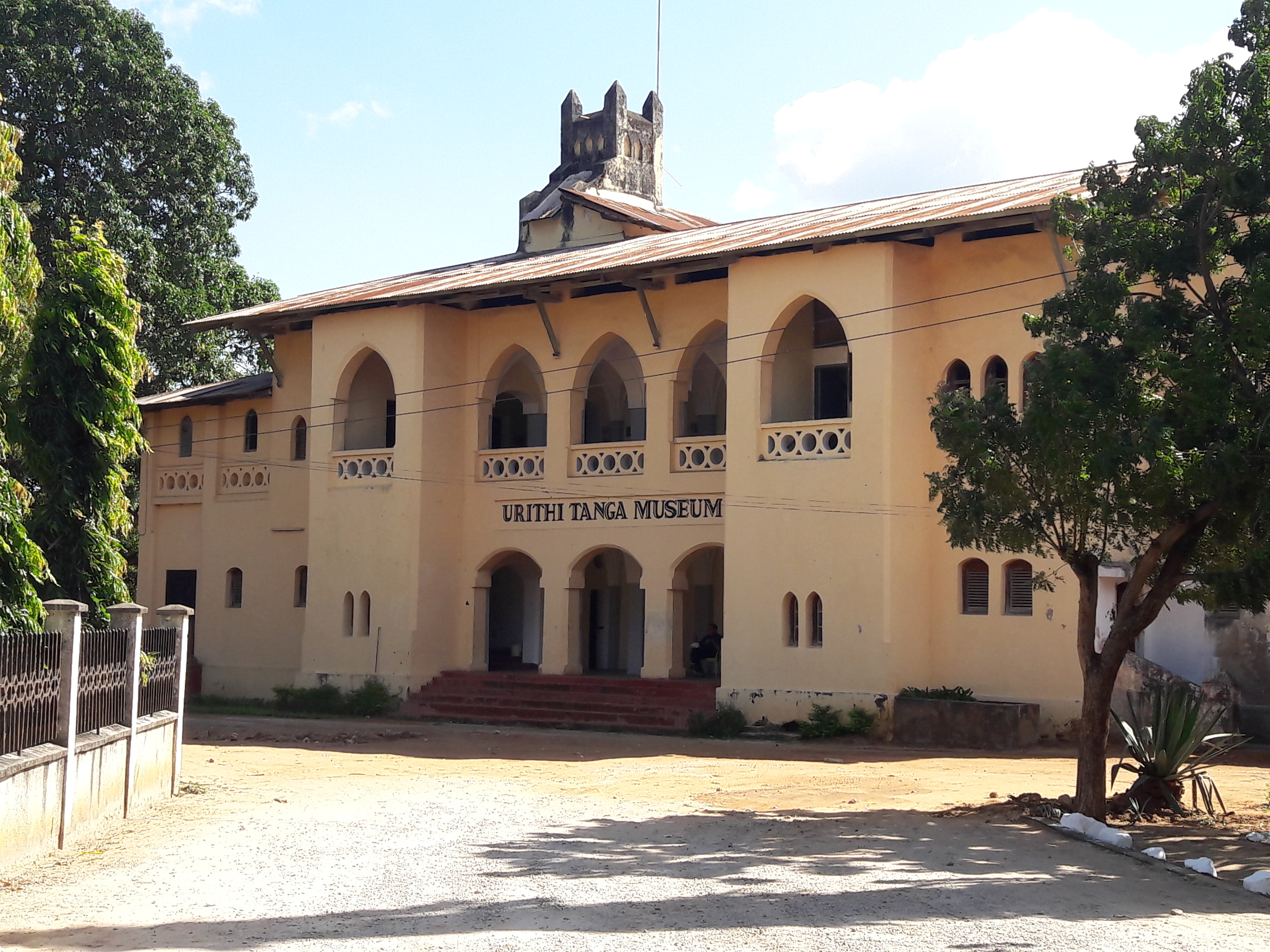
Urithi Tanga Museum, the Old German Boma.

== See also ==
- Historic Swahili Settlements

== Sources ==
- Byron Farwell, The Great War in Africa, 1914-1918 (W. W. Norton, 1986)
