= JKT Mgambo =

- Ground: Mkwakwani Stadium, Tanga, Tanzania
- Capacity: 10,000
- League: Tanzanian Premier League

JKT Mgambo is a football club based in Tanga, Tanzania. They play in the top level of Tanzanian professional football, the Tanzanian Premier League. They drew an average home attendance of 626 in the 2023–24 Tanzanian Premier League.
