= Toto African =

Toto African SC
- Full name: Toto African Sports Club
- Ground: CCM Kirumba Stadium; Mwanza, Tanzania
- Capacity: 35,000
- League: Tanzanian Premier League
- 2012/13: 13th
Home colours

Toto African SC is a football club in Mwanza, Tanzania. Toto African play at the highest level of professional football, the Tanzanian Premier League. They returned to the highest level in the season 2015/2016, after they had been relegated at the end of the 2012/13 season.

Toto African celebrated their return to the highest level of Tanzanian football with a 1–0 win against Mwadui FC at Kirumba Stadium on September 12, 2015. Miraji Athumani scored the only goal of the game.

Toto African play their home games at the CCM Kirumba Stadium.
