= Maji Maji F.C. =

Maji-Maji Football Club is a football club based in Songea, Ruvuma Region, Tanzania. They play at the 30,000-capacity Maji-Maji Stadium.

== History ==
The club was founded in 1978.

Maji Maji FC
- Full name: Maji Maji Football Club
- Founded: 1978
- Ground: Maji Maji Stadium, Songea
- Capacity: 30,000
- League: Tanzanian Premier League

They play in the Tanzanian Premier League.

== Achievements ==
- Tanzanian Premier League: 3

1985, 1986, 1998

== Current squad ==
Note: Flags indicate national team as defined under FIFA eligibility rules; some limited exceptions apply. Players may hold more than one non-FIFA nationality.

No.	Pos.	Nation	Player
—	DF	(Tanzania) TAN	Fredy Mbuna
