= Villa Squad =

- Full name: Villa Squad
- Nickname: Kambi Moto
- Founded: 1973
- Ground: Chamazi, Tanzania
- Coach: Martin Mahimbo
- League: Tanzanian Second Division League

Villa Squad is a football club from Dar es Salaam, Tanzania who play in the Tanzanian Second Division League. They play their home games at the Chamazi Stadium in Dar es Salaam.has cultivated players who went to feature in the Tanzanian national team like Haruna Moshi Shaban and Godfrey Taita.
