= CAF Confederation Cup records and statistics =

This page details statistics of CAF Confederation Cup.

== General performances ==
=== By club ===
Performance in the CAF Confederation Cup by club
Club	Titles	Runners-up	Seasons won	Seasons runners-up
(Morocco) RS Berkane	3	2	2020, 2022, 2025	2019, 2024
(Tunisia) CS Sfaxien	3	1	2007, 2008, 2013	2010
(Tunisia) Étoile du Sahel	2	1	2006, 2015	2008
(Democratic Republic of the Congo) TP Mazembe	2	1	2016, 2017	2013
(Egypt) Zamalek	2	1	2019, 2024	2026
(Morocco) Raja CA	2	0	2018, 2021	
(Algeria) USM Alger	2	0	2023, 2026	
(Morocco) FAR Rabat	1	1	2005	2006
(Ghana) Hearts of Oak	1	0	2004	
(Mali) Stade Malien	1	0	2009	
(Morocco) FUS Rabat	1	0	2010	
(Morocco) MAS Fez	1	0	2011	
(Republic of the Congo) AC Léopards	1	0	2012	
(Egypt) Al Ahly	1	0	2014	
(South Africa) Orlando Pirates	0	2		2015, 2022
(Ghana) Asante Kotoko	0	1		2004
(Nigeria) Dolphins FC	0	1		2005
(Sudan) Al-Merrikh	0	1		2007
(Algeria) ES Sétif	0	1		2009
(Tunisia) Club Africain	0	1		2011
(Mali) Djoliba AC	0	1		2012
(Ivory Coast) Séwé Sport	0	1		2014
(Algeria) MO Béjaïa	0	1		2016
(South Africa) SuperSport United	0	1		2017
(Democratic Republic of the Congo) AS Vita Club	0	1		2018
(Egypt) Pyramids	0	1		2020
(Algeria) JS Kabylie	0	1		2021
(Tanzania) Young Africans	0	1		2023
(Tanzania) Simba	0	1		2025

=== By nation ===
Nation	Winners	Runners-up	Winning clubs	Runners-up
Morocco	8	3	RS Berkane (3); Raja Casablanca (2); FAR Rabat (1); FUS Rabat (1); MAS Fez (1)	RS Berkane (2); FAR Rabat (1)
Tunisia	5	3	CS Sfaxien (3); Étoile du Sahel (2)	Étoile du Sahel (1); CS Sfaxien (1); Club Africain (1)
Egypt	3	1	Zamalek (2); Al-Ahly (1)	Pyramids (1)
Congo DR	2	2	TP Mazembe (2)	TP Mazembe (1); AS Vita Club (1)
Algeria	1	3	USM Alger (1)	ES Sétif (1); MO Béjaïa (1); JS Kabylie (1)
Ghana	1	1	Hearts of Oak (1)	Asante Kotoko (1)
Mali	1	1	Stade Malien (1)	Djoliba AC (1)
Congo	1	0	AC Léopards (1)	—
South Africa	0	3	—	Orlando Pirates (2); SuperSport United (1)
Tanzania	0	2	—	Young Africans (1); Simba S.C.(1)
Ivory Coast	0	1	—	Séwé Sport (1)
Nigeria	0	1	—	Dolphins FC (1)
Sudan	0	1	—	Al-Merrikh (1)

=== By semi-final appearances ===
Team	No.	Years
(Tunisia) Étoile du Sahel	5	**2006**, **2008**, **2015**, 2016, 2019
(Tunisia) CS Sfaxien	5	**2007**, **2008**, **2010**, **2013**, 2019
(Morocco) RS Berkane	5	**2019**, **2020**, **2022**, **2024**, 2025
(Democratic Republic of the Congo) TP Mazembe	4	**2013**, **2016**, **2017**, 2022
(Egypt) Zamalek SC	4	2015, **2019**, **2024**, 2026
(Morocco) FUS Rabat	3	**2010**, 2016, 2017
(Algeria) USM Alger	3	**2023**, 2024, 2026
(Sudan) Al-Merrikh	2	**2007**, 2012
(Cameroon) Coton Sport	2	2014, 2021
(Morocco) FAR Rabat	2	**2005**, **2006**
(Mali) Stade Malien	2	**2009**, 2013
(Sudan) Al-Hilal	2	2010, 2012
(Tunisia) Club Africain	2	**2011**, 2017
(Republic of the Congo) AC Léopards	2	**2012**, 2014
(Egypt) Al-Ahly	2	**2014**, 2015
(Morocco) Raja Casablanca	2	**2018**, **2021**
(South Africa) Orlando Pirates	2	**2015**, **2022**
(Egypt) Pyramids	2	**2020**, 2021
(Ghana) Asante Kotoko	1	**2004**
(Ghana) Hearts of Oak	1	**2004**
(Nigeria) Dolphins FC	1	**2005**
(Nigeria) Bayelsa United	1	2009
(Egypt) ENPPI Club	1	2009
(Algeria) ES Sétif	1	**2009**
(Libya) Al-Ittihad	1	2010
(Angola) Interclube	1	2011
(Morocco) MAS Fez	1	**2011**
(Nigeria) Sunshine Stars	1	2011
(Mali) Djoliba AC	1	**2012**
(Tunisia) CA Bizertin	1	2013
(Ivory Coast) Séwé Sport	1	**2014**
(Algeria) MO Béjaïa	1	**2016**
(South Africa) SuperSport	1	**2017**
(Egypt) Al Masry	1	2018
(Nigeria) Enyimba	1	2018
(Democratic Republic of the Congo) AS Vita Club	1	**2018**
(Morocco) Hassania Agadir	1	2020
(Guinea) Horoya	1	2020
(Algeria) JS Kabylie	1	**2021**
(Libya) Al-Ahli Tripoli	1	2022
(Tanzania) Young Africans	1	**2023**
(Ivory Coast) ASEC Mimosas	1	2023
(South Africa) Marumo Gallants	1	2023
(Ghana) Dreams FC	1	2024
(Algeria) CS Constantine	1	2025
(Tanzania) Simba S.C.	1	2025
(South Africa) Stellenbosch F.C.	1	2025
(Algeria) CR Belouizdad	1	2026
(Morocco) Olympique Safi	1	2026

Team in Bold:	Finalist team in season

== Records and statistics ==
The following is a list of clubs that have played in the CAF Confederation Cup. The list is arrayed in order of number of clubs that reached the group stage.
564 clubs participated in the Confederation Cup (22 editions, as of 2025), 283 teams participated only once. 125 teams from 33 countries qualified to the group stage.

=== Group stage qualification ===
Nation	#	Club	Group stage qualification
Algeria (10)	5	USM Alger	**2018**, **2023**, **2024**, **2025**, **2026**
Algeria (10)	3	JS Kabylie	2008*, 2011, **2021**
Algeria (10)	3	ES Sétif	**2009**, 2013*, 2021
Algeria (10)	1	MO Béjaïa	**2016***
Algeria (10)	1	MC Alger	**2017**
Algeria (10)	1	NA Hussein Dey	2019
Algeria (10)	1	Paradou AC	2020
Algeria (10)	1	JS Saoura	2022
Algeria (10)	1	CS Constantine	**2025**
Algeria (10)	1	CR Belouizdad	**2026**
Angola (9)	4	Inter Luanda	2006, 2008*, **2011***, 2012
Angola (9)	3	Petro Atlético	2004*, 2006, 2019
Angola (9)	1	Primeiro de Agosto	2009*
Angola (9)	1	Santos FC	2009
Angola (9)	1	Recreativo do Libolo	2017
Angola (9)	1	Académica do Lobito	2024
Angola (9)	1	Sagrada Esperança	2024
Angola (9)	1	Bravos do Maquis	2025
Angola (9)	1	Lunda Sul	2025
Benin (1)	1	ESAE	2020
Botswana (1)	1	Orapa United FC	2025
Burkina Faso (1)	2	Salitas	2019, 2021
Cameroon (3)	4	Coton Sport	2004*, **2014***, **2021**, 2022
Cameroon (3)	1	Sable FC	2004
Cameroon (3)	1	Les Astres FC	2007
(Republic of the Congo) Congo (4)	3	AC Léopards	**2012**, **2014***, 2015*
(Republic of the Congo) Congo (4)	3	AS Otohô	2019*, 2022*, **2026**
(Republic of the Congo) Congo (4)	2	CSMD Diables Noirs	2023, 2024
(Republic of the Congo) Congo (4)	1	CARA Brazzaville	**2018**
(Democratic Republic of the Congo) DR Congo (5)	6	TP Mazembe	2007*, **2013***, **2016***, **2017***, **2022***, 2023*
(Democratic Republic of the Congo) DR Congo (5)	3	DC Motema Pembe	2011, 2020, 2023
(Democratic Republic of the Congo) DR Congo (5)	2	FC Lupopo	2006*, 2023
(Democratic Republic of the Congo) DR Congo (5)	2	AS Vita Club	2009, **2018***
(Democratic Republic of the Congo) DR Congo (5)	1	AS Maniema Union	**2026**
Egypt (9)	5	Zamalek	**2015**, **2019**, **2024**, **2025**, **2026**
Egypt (9)	5	Al-Masry	**2018**, **2020**, **2022**, **2025**, **2026**
Egypt (9)	4	Pyramids	**2020**, **2021**, **2022**, 2023
Egypt (9)	3	Haras El-Hodood	2008, 2009, 2010
Egypt (9)	2	Ismaily SC	2005, 2007
Egypt (9)	2	ENPPI Club	2007, **2009**
Egypt (9)	2	Al Ahly	**2014***, **2015***
Egypt (9)	2	Future	2023, **2024**
Egypt (9)	1	Smouha	2017
Equatorial Guinea (1)	1	Renacimiento FC	2006*
Eswatini (2)	1	Mbabane Swallows	2017
Eswatini (2)	1	Royal Leopards	2022*
Ethiopia (1)	1	Saint George SC	2013*
Gabon (2)	1	FC 105	2005
Gabon (2)	1	CF Mounana	2017
Ghana (6)	3	Asante Kotoko	**2004***, 2008, 2019
Ghana (6)	1	Hearts of Oak	**2004***
Ghana (6)	1	King Faisal Babes	2005
Ghana (6)	1	Medeama SC	2016
Ghana (6)	1	Aduana Stars	2018*
Ghana (6)	1	Dreams FC	**2024**
Guinea (3)	2	Horoya AC	2017*, **2020***
Guinea (3)	1	Fello Star	2005*
Guinea (3)	1	Académie SOAR	2024
Ivory Coast (4)	6	ASEC Mimosas	2011*, 2014*, 2018*, 2022*, 2023*, **2025**
Ivory Coast (4)	2	FC San Pédro	2020, 2026
Ivory Coast (4)	1	Séwé Sport	**2014***
Ivory Coast (4)	1	Williamsville AC	2018*
Kenya (2)	2	Gor Mahia	2018*, **2019***
Kenya (2)	1	Nairobi United	2026
Libya (7)	2	Al-Ittihad	**2010***, **2022***
Libya (7)	2	Al-Ahli Tripoli	2016*, **2022**
Libya (7)	1	Al-Nasr	**2020***
Libya (7)	1	Al-Ahly Benghazi	2021*
Libya (7)	1	Al Akhdar	2023
Libya (7)	1	Abu Salim	**2024**
Libya (7)	1	Al-Hilal Beghazi	2024
Mali (3)	6	Stade Malien	**2009**, **2012**, **2013**, 2015, **2024**, 2025
Mali (3)	5	Djoliba AC	2010, **2012**, 2018, 2020, 2026
Mali (3)	2	Real Bamako	2014, 2023
Mauritania (1)	1	FC Nouadhibou	2020*
Morocco (10)	7	RS Berkane	**2018**, **2019**, **2020**, 2021, **2022**, **2024**, **2025**
Morocco (10)	4	FUS de Rabat	**2010**, 2013*, **2016**, **2017***
Morocco (10)	3	FAR Rabat	**2005***, **2006***, 2023
Morocco (10)	3	Raja Casablanca	**2018**, 2019, **2021***
Morocco (10)	2	Wydad Casablanca	2012, **2026**
Morocco (10)	2	Hassania Agadir	**2019**, **2020**
Morocco (10)	1	Olympique Khouribga	2006
Morocco (10)	1	MAS Fez	**2011**
Morocco (10)	1	Kawkab Marrakech	2016
Morocco (10)	1	Olympic Safi	**2026**
Mozambique (2)	1	UD Songo	2018*
Mozambique (2)	1	Black Bulls	2025
Niger (2)	1	AS FAN	2010
Niger (2)	1	USGN	2022*
Nigeria (8)	4	Enyimba FC	**2018**, **2020***, **2021***, 2025
Nigeria (8)	3	Rivers United	2017, 2023*, **2024**
Nigeria (8)	3	Enugu Rangers	2004, 2019, 2020
Nigeria (8)	2	Dolphins FC	**2005**, 2007
Nigeria (8)	1	Kwara United	2007
Nigeria (8)	1	Bayelsa United	**2009**
Nigeria (8)	1	Sunshine Stars	**2011**
Nigeria (8)	1	Kaduna United	2011
Rwanda (1)	1	Rayon Sports	**2018***
Senegal (2)	1	ASC Diaraf	**2021**
Senegal (2)	1	ASC Jaraaf	2025
South Africa (10)	3	Orlando Pirates	**2015**, **2021**, **2022**
South Africa (10)	2	Supersport United	**2017**, 2024
South Africa (10)	2	Stellenbosch	**2025**, 2026
South Africa (10)	1	Santos FC	2004
South Africa (10)	1	Mamelodi Sundowns	2007
South Africa (10)	1	Platinum Stars	2017
South Africa (10)	1	Bidvest Wits	2020
South Africa (10)	1	Marumo Gallants	2023
South Africa (10)	1	Sekhukhune United	2024
South Africa (10)	1	Kaizer Chiefs	2026
Sudan (4)	5	Al-Hilal	2004, **2010**, **2012**, 2018*, **2019***
Sudan (4)	3	Al-Merrikh	**2007**, 2008, **2012**
Sudan (4)	1	Al-Ahly Shendi	2012
Sudan (4)	1	Al-Hilal Al-Ubayyid	**2017**
Tanzania (5)	3	Young Africans	2016, 2018*, 2023*
Tanzania (5)	2	Simba	**2022***, **2025**
Tanzania (5)	1	Namungo	2021
Tanzania (5)	1	Azam	2026
Tanzania (5)	1	Singida Black Stars	2026
Togo (1)	1	ASKO Kara	2023*
Tunisia (7)	10	CS Sfaxien	**2007**, **2008**, **2010**, **2013**, 2015, **2017**, **2019**, **2021***, 2022, 2025
Tunisia (7)	8	Étoile du Sahel	**2006**, **2008**, 2013, 2014, 2015, **2016**, **2019**, 2021
Tunisia (7)	4	Club Africain	2008, **2011**, **2017**, 2024
Tunisia (7)	2	Espérance de Tunis	2006, 2015
Tunisia (7)	1	AS Marsa	2005
Tunisia (7)	1	CA Bizertin	**2013**
Tunisia (7)	1	US Monastir	2023*
Uganda (1)	1	KCCA	2017
Zambia (4)	3	Zanaco	2010, **2020**, 2022*
Zambia (4)	3	Nkana	2014, **2019***, 2021*
Zambia (4)	3	ZESCO United	**2017**, 2019*, 2026
Zambia (4)	1	NAPSA Stars	2021

Teams in bold qualified for the knockout phase (2004-2008 for final, 2009-2016 for semi-finals, since 2017 for quarter-finals).

=== Participation and group stage qualification ===
Nation	#	Club	Years of participation	Group stage qualification
Algeria (15)	8	USM Alger	2005*, 2013, **2018**, 2023, 2024, 2025, 2026, 2027	2018, 2023, 2024, 2025, 2026
Algeria (15)	6	CR Belouizdad	2004, 2010, 2018, 2020, 2026, 2027	2026
Algeria (15)	5	JS Kabylie	2008*, 2011, 2017, **2021**, 2022	2008, 2011, 2021
Algeria (15)	5	ES Sétif	**2009**, 2011*, 2012, 2013, 2021	2009, 2013, 2021
Algeria (15)	4	ASO Chlef	2006, 2007, 2015, 2024	
Algeria (15)	4	MC Alger	2007, 2008, 2015, **2017**	2017
Algeria (15)	3	JSM Béjaïa	2008, 2009, 2013*	
Algeria (15)	3	CS Constantine	2014, 2016, 2025	2025
Algeria (15)	2	MC Oran	2005, 2016	
Algeria (15)	2	NA Hussein Dey	2006, 2019	2019
Algeria (15)	2	JS Saoura	2022, 2023	2022
Algeria (15)	1	CA Batna	2011	
Algeria (15)	1	MO Béjaïa	**2016***	2016
Algeria (15)	1	USM Bel Abbès	2019	
Algeria (15)	1	Paradou AC	2020	2020
Angola (18)	9	Petro Atlético	2004*, 2006, 2008, 2010*, 2013, 2014, 2015, 2018, 2019	2004*, 2006, 2019
Angola (18)	8	Inter Luanda	2004, 2005, 2006, 2007, 2008*, **2011***, 2012, 2022	2006, 2008, 2011, 2012
Angola (18)	8	Primeiro de Agosto	2009*, 2010, 2011, 2021*, 2022, 2023*, 2026, 2027	2009
Angola (18)	4	Sagrada Esperança	2016, 2021, 2023, 2024	2024
Angola (18)	2	AS Aviação	2005*, 2011	
Angola (18)	2	Benfica Luanda	2007, 2015	
Angola (18)	2	Recreativo do Libolo	2009, 2017	2017
Angola (18)	2	Bravos do Maquis	2021, 2025	2025
Angola (18)	2	Kabuscorp	2026, 2027	
Angola (18)	1	Petro do Huambo	2004	
Angola (18)	1	Atlético do Namibe	2005	
Angola (18)	1	Primeiro de Maio	2008	
Angola (18)	1	Santos FC	2009	2009
Angola (18)	1	Académica do Soyo	2010	
Angola (18)	1	Recreativo da Caála	2013	
Angola (18)	1	Desportivo da Huíla	2014	
Angola (18)	1	Académica do Lobito	2024	2024
Angola (18)	1	Lunda Sul	2025	2025
Benin (12)	2	Mogas 90	2004, 2005	
Benin (12)	2	Dragons de l'Ouémé	2007, 2012	
Benin (12)	2	ESAE	2020, 2021	2020
Benin (12)	2	Buffles du Borgou	2022, 2023	
Benin (12)	1	UNB FC	2008	
Benin (12)	1	USS Kraké	2011	
Benin (12)	1	AS Police	2015	
Benin (12)	1	Energie	2018	
Benin (12)	1	Loto-Popo FC	2024	
Benin (12)	1	Dadjè FC	2025	
Benin (12)	1	Coton FC	2026	
Benin (12)	1	ASPAC FC	2027	
Botswana (9)	5	Gaborone United	2010*, 2013, 2014, 2016, 2024	
Botswana (9)	5	Orapa United FC	2017, 2019, 2021, 2022, 2025	2025
Botswana (9)	5	Jwaneng Galaxy	2018, 2020, 2021*, 2026, 2027	
Botswana (9)	2	Botswana Defence Force	2005, 2015	
Botswana (9)	1	Township Rollers	2006	
Botswana (9)	1	Notwane FC	2007	
Botswana (9)	1	UF Santos	2010	
Botswana (9)	1	Extension Gunners	2012	
Botswana (9)	1	Security Systems	2023	
Burkina Faso (11)	6	Étoile Filante	2004, 2007, 2012, 2018, 2024, 2025	
Burkina Faso (11)	4	US Forces Armées	2010, 2011, 2016, 2026	
Burkina Faso (11)	3	Rail Club du Kadiogo	2013, 2017, 2023*	
Burkina Faso (11)	3	Salitas	2019, 2020, 2021	2019, 2021
Burkina Faso (11)	2	US Ouagadougou	2006, 2009	
Burkina Faso (11)	2	AS SONABEL	2014, 2017	
Burkina Faso (11)	1	ASF Bobo Dioulasso	2005	
Burkina Faso (11)	1	RC Bobo Dioulasso	2015	
Burkina Faso (11)	1	ASFA Yennenga	2022	
Burkina Faso (11)	1	Douanes de Ouagadougou	2023	
Burkina Faso (11)	1	Vitesse	2027	
Burundi (13)	3	Rukinzo	2020, 2025, 2027	
Burundi (13)	2	AS Inter Star	2008, 2011	
Burundi (13)	2	Vital'O FC	2009, 2019	
Burundi (13)	2	Atlético Olympic	2010, 2016	
Burundi (13)	2	LLBA FC	2012, 2013	
Burundi (13)	2	Le Messager FC	2015, 2017	
Burundi (13)	2	Bumamuru	2022, 2023	
Burundi (13)	2	Flambeau du Centre	2023*, 2026	
Burundi (13)	1	Prince Louis FC	2007	
Burundi (13)	1	Académie Tchité	2014	
Burundi (13)	1	Olympique Star	2018	
Burundi (13)	1	Musongati	2021	
Burundi (13)	1	Aigle Noir	2024	
Cameroon (20)	8	Coton Sport	2004*, 2007*, 2009*, 2010, 2012*, **2014***, **2021**, 2022	2004*, 2014*, 2021, 2022
Cameroon (20)	5	Union Douala	2005, 2007, 2009, 2012, 2014	
Cameroon (20)	4	Panthère du Ndé	2010, 2013, 2015, 2027	
Cameroon (20)	3	Les Astres FC	2006, 2007, 2008	2007
Cameroon (20)	3	Unisport FC	2012, 2013, 2015	
Cameroon (20)	3	New Star de Douala	2016, 2018, 2019	
Cameroon (20)	2	PWD Bamenda	2004, 2023	
Cameroon (20)	2	Aigle Royal	2009, 2026	
Cameroon (20)	2	Fovu Club	2011, 2025	
Cameroon (20)	2	Yong Sports Academy	2014, 2017	
Cameroon (20)	1	Canon Yaoundé	2004*	
Cameroon (20)	1	Sable FC	2004	2004
Cameroon (20)	1	Bamboutos FC	2005	
Cameroon (20)	1	Impôts FC	2006	
Cameroon (20)	1	Mount Cameroon FC	2008	
Cameroon (20)	1	Tiko United	2011	
Cameroon (20)	1	UMS de Loum	2016	
Cameroon (20)	1	APEJES Academy	2017	
Cameroon (20)	1	Eding Sport	2019	
Cameroon (20)	1	Stade Renard de Melong	2020	
(Central African Republic) Central African Rep. (4)	4	Anges de Fatima	2009, 2010, 2013, 2019	
(Central African Republic) Central African Rep. (4)	1	TP USCA	2006	
(Central African Republic) Central African Rep. (4)	1	DFC 8ème Arrondissement	2011	
(Central African Republic) Central African Rep. (4)	1	Tempête Mocaf	2012	
Chad (9)	4	AS CotonTchad	2007, 2010, 2019, 2020	
Chad (9)	4	Elect-Sport FC	2013, 2015, 2020*, 2025	
Chad (9)	3	Renaissance FC	2012, 2016, 2021	
Chad (9)	2	Gazelle FC	2005, 2021*	
Chad (9)	2	Tourbillon FC	2006, 2009	
Chad (9)	1	Foullah Edifice	2011	
Chad (9)	1	ASLAD de Moundou	2014	
Chad (9)	1	AS Santé d'Abéché	2023	
Chad (9)	1	AS PSI	2027	
Comoros (10)	2	Volcan Club	2015, 2017	
Comoros (10)	2	Ngazi Sport	2018, 2021	
Comoros (10)	1	Élan Club	2006	
Comoros (10)	1	Fomboni Club	2016	
Comoros (10)	1	Miracle Club	2019	
Comoros (10)	1	Olympique de Missiri	2022	
Comoros (10)	1	Belle Lumière	2024^{W}	
Comoros (10)	1	Alizé Fort	2025	
Comoros (10)	1	Djabal d'Iconi	2026	
Comoros (10)	1	Atomic Ngomé	2027	
(Republic of the Congo) Congo (11)	7	Diables Noirs	2004, 2006, 2013, 2016, 2019, 2022, 2023, 2024	2023, 2024
(Republic of the Congo) Congo (11)	6	AC Léopards	2010, 2011, **2012**, **2014***, 2015*, 2017	2012, 2014*, 2015*
(Republic of the Congo) Congo (11)	5	Étoile du Congo	2007*, 2015, 2017, 2020, 2021	
(Republic of the Congo) Congo (11)	4	CARA Brazzaville	2014, 2015, 2017, **2018**	2018
(Republic of the Congo) Congo (11)	4	AS Otohô	2019*, 2022*, 2025, 2026	2019*, 2022*, 2026
(Republic of the Congo) Congo (11)	2	JS Talangaï	2007, 2008	
(Republic of the Congo) Congo (11)	1	Munisport de Pointe-Noire	2005	
(Republic of the Congo) Congo (11)	1	Club 57 Tourbillon	2009	
(Republic of the Congo) Congo (11)	1	AS Kondzo	2014	
(Republic of the Congo) Congo (11)	1	Vita Club Mokanda	2016	
(Republic of the Congo) Congo (11)	1	CS La Mancha	2018	
(Democratic Republic of the Congo) DR Congo (16)	11	DC Motema Pembe	2004, 2007, 2010, 2011, 2013, 2018, 2019, 2020, 2021, 2022, 2023	2011, 2020, 2023
(Democratic Republic of the Congo) DR Congo (16)	8	TP Mazembe	2004, 2006, 2007*, **2013***, **2016***, **2017***, **2022***, 2023*	2007, 2013*, 2016*, 2017*, 2022*, 2023*
(Democratic Republic of the Congo) DR Congo (16)	8	FC Lupopo	2005, 2006*, 2011, 2012, 2016, 2023, 2024, 2025	2006, 2023
(Democratic Republic of the Congo) DR Congo (16)	7	AS Vita Club	2008, 2009, 2010, 2015, **2018***, 2022, 2025	2009, 2018*
(Democratic Republic of the Congo) DR Congo (16)	7	AS Maniema Union	2008, 2018, 2020, 2021, 2022*, 2026, 2027	2026
(Democratic Republic of the Congo) DR Congo (16)	3	CS Don Bosco	2013, 2014, 2016	
(Democratic Republic of the Congo) DR Congo (16)	2	OC Bukavu Dawa	2007, 2009	
(Democratic Republic of the Congo) DR Congo (16)	2	FC MK Etanchéité	2014, 2015	
(Democratic Republic of the Congo) DR Congo (16)	2	SM Sanga Balende	2015*, 2017	
(Democratic Republic of the Congo) DR Congo (16)	1	SC Cilu	2005	
(Democratic Republic of the Congo) DR Congo (16)	1	AS Kabasha	2006	
(Democratic Republic of the Congo) DR Congo (16)	1	US Tshinkunku	2012	
(Democratic Republic of the Congo) DR Congo (16)	1	Renaissance du Congo	2017	
(Democratic Republic of the Congo) DR Congo (16)	1	AS Nyuki	2019	
(Democratic Republic of the Congo) DR Congo (16)	1	AS Simba	2026	
(Democratic Republic of the Congo) DR Congo (16)	1	DC Virunga	2027	
Djibouti (4)	2	ASAS Télécom	2023, 2027	
Djibouti (4)	1	FC Dikhil	2022	
Djibouti (4)	1	Arta Solar	2024	
Djibouti (4)	1	AS Port	2026	
Egypt (15)	7	Al-Masry	2017, **2018**, 2019, **2020**, 2022, 2025, 2026	2018, 2020, 2022, 2025, 2026
Egypt (15)	6	Ismaily SC	2004, 2005, 2007, 2011, 2013, 2014	2005, 2007
Egypt (15)	6	Zamalek	**2015**, 2018, **2019**, 2024, 2025, 2026	2015, 2019, 2024, 2025, 2026
Egypt (15)	5	Haras El-Hodood	2006, 2008, 2009, 2010, 2011	2008, 2009, 2010
Egypt (15)	5	ENPPI Club	2007, **2009**, 2012, 2013, 2016	2009
Egypt (15)	4	Al Ahly	2009*, **2014***, **2015***, 2027	2014*, 2015*
Egypt (15)	4	Pyramids	**2020**, **2021**, **2022**, 2023	2020, 2021, 2022, 2023
Egypt (15)	2	El Mokawloon	2005, 2021	
Egypt (15)	2	Petrojet FC	2010, 2015	
Egypt (15)	2	Future	2023, 2024	2023, 2024
Egypt (15)	1	Al-Ittihad Alexandria	2006	
Egypt (15)	1	Wadi Degla	2014	
Egypt (15)	1	Misr Lel-Makkasa	2016	
Egypt (15)	1	Smouha	2017	2017
Egypt (15)	1	ZED FC	2027	
Equatorial Guinea (16)	3	Deportivo Mongomo	2004, 2009, 2016	
Equatorial Guinea (16)	3	Akonangui FC	2006, 2008, 2020	
Equatorial Guinea (16)	3	The Panthers FC	2013, 2014, 2027	
Equatorial Guinea (16)	2	CD Elá Nguema	2005, 2011	
Equatorial Guinea (16)	2	Cano Sport	2020*, 2024	
Equatorial Guinea (16)	2	Futuro Kings	2021, 2022	
Equatorial Guinea (16)	2	15 de Agosto	2025, 2026	
Equatorial Guinea (16)	1	Renacimiento FC	2006*	2006
Equatorial Guinea (16)	1	San Pedro Claver	2007	
Equatorial Guinea (16)	1	Dragón FC	2010	
Equatorial Guinea (16)	1	Atlético Semu	2012	
Equatorial Guinea (16)	1	Vegetarianos FC	2015	
Equatorial Guinea (16)	1	Racing de Micomeseng	2017	
Equatorial Guinea (16)	1	Deportivo Niefang	2018	
Equatorial Guinea (16)	1	Deportivo Unidad	2019	
Equatorial Guinea (16)	1	Inter de Litoral Academy	2023	
Eswatini (7)	6	Young Buffaloes	2018, 2019, 2020, 2021*, 2022, 2024^{W}	
Eswatini (7)	5	Royal Leopards	2012, 2015, 2022*, 2023*, 2026	2022*
Eswatini (7)	4	Mbabane Highlanders	2010, 2011, 2013, 2023	
Eswatini (7)	2	Mbabane Swallows	2017, 2021	2017
Eswatini (7)	1	Malanti Chiefs	2009	
Eswatini (7)	1	Nsingzini Hotspurs	2025	
Eswatini (7)	1	Green Mamba	2027	
Ethiopia (12)	5	Defence Force SC	2007, 2014, 2016, 2017, 2019	
Ethiopia (12)	3	Ethiopian Coffee FC	2004, 2022, 2025	
Ethiopia (12)	3	Dedebit FC	2011, 2013, 2015	
Ethiopia (12)	3	Saint George SC	2012, 2013*, 2018*	2013*
Ethiopia (12)	3	Fasil Kenema	2020, 2021, 2023	
Ethiopia (12)	2	CBE SA	2005, 2010	
Ethiopia (12)	2	Welayta Dicha	2018, 2026	
Ethiopia (12)	1	Awassa City FC	2006	
Ethiopia (12)	1	Harar Beer Bottling	2008	
Ethiopia (12)	1	Jimma Aba Jifar	2019*	
Ethiopia (12)	1	Bahir Dar Kenema	2024	
Ethiopia (12)	1	Welwalo Adigrat	2027	
Gabon (12)	5	CF Mounana	2014, 2015, 2016, 2017, 2018*	2017
Gabon (12)	3	FC 105	2005, 2010, 2026	2005
Gabon (12)	3	AS Mangasport	2008, 2012, 2018	
Gabon (12)	2	USM Libreville	2004, 2009	
Gabon (12)	1	Sogéa FC	2006	
Gabon (12)	1	Delta Téléstar FC	2007	
Gabon (12)	1	Missile FC	2011	
Gabon (12)	1	US Bitam	2013	
Gabon (12)	1	Akanda FC	2017	
Gabon (12)	1	Cercle Mbéri Sportif	2019	
Gabon (12)	1	AS Pélican	2020	
Gabon (12)	1	AS Bouenguidi	2021*	
(The Gambia) Gambia (5)	4	Gamtel FC	2012, 2013, 2014, 2021	
(The Gambia) Gambia (5)	2	Wallidan FC	2004, 2016	
(The Gambia) Gambia (5)	2	Banjul Hawks	2007, 2018	
(The Gambia) Gambia (5)	2	Ports Authority FC	2008, 2017	
(The Gambia) Gambia (5)	1	Armed Forces	2019	
Ghana (15)	7	Asante Kotoko	**2004***, 2008, 2018, 2019, 2020*, 2021, 2026	2004*, 2008, 2019
Ghana (15)	4	Hearts of Oak	**2004***, 2015, 2022*, 2023	2004*
Ghana (15)	3	King Faisal Babes	2004, 2005, 2006	2005
Ghana (15)	3	Ashanti Gold	2011, 2020, 2021	
Ghana (15)	2	Medeama SC	2014, 2016	2016
Ghana (15)	1	Liberty Professionals	2004	
Ghana (15)	1	Berekum Arsenal	2006	
Ghana (15)	1	Tema Youth	2007	
Ghana (15)	1	New Edubiase United	2013	
Ghana (15)	1	Ebusua Dwarfs	2014	
Ghana (15)	1	Bechem United	2017	
Ghana (15)	1	Aduana Stars	2018*	2018*
Ghana (15)	1	Dreams FC	2024	2024
Ghana (15)	1	Nsoatreman	2025	
Ghana (15)	1	Nations	2027	
Guinea (14)	5	Kaloum Star	2006, 2015*, 2016, 2017, 2021	
Guinea (14)	4	Club Industriel	2005, 2014, 2019, 2021	
Guinea (14)	4	Horoya AC	2014*, 2015, 2017*, **2020***	2017*, 2020*
Guinea (14)	4	Hafia	2018, 2025, 2026, 2027	
Guinea (14)	3	Satellite FC	2007, 2008, 2009	
Guinea (14)	3	FC Séquence	2011, 2012, 2013	
Guinea (14)	2	Wakriya	2019, 2022	
Guinea (14)	2	AS Ashanti Golden Boys	2022, 2023	
Guinea (14)	2	Milo	2023, 2024	
Guinea (14)	1	Étoile de Guinée	2004	
Guinea (14)	1	Fello Star	2005*	2005
Guinea (14)	1	Baraka Djoma	2010	
Guinea (14)	1	Santoba	2020	
Guinea (14)	1	Académie SOAR	2024	2024
Guinea-Bissau (2)	3	Sport Bissau e Benfica	2007, 2009, 2010	
Guinea-Bissau (2)	1	UD Internacional	2027	
Ivory Coast (19)	11	ASEC Mimosas	2009*, 2011*, 2012, 2013, 2014*, 2015, 2017, 2018*, 2022*, 2023*, 2025	2011*, 2014*, 2018*, 2022*, 2023*, 2025
Ivory Coast (19)	5	Séwé Sport	2006, 2010, 2011, 2012, **2014***	2014*
Ivory Coast (19)	4	Africa Sports	2005*, 2011, 2016, 2018	
Ivory Coast (19)	4	FC San Pédro	2019, 2020, 2021, 2026	2020, 2026
Ivory Coast (19)	3	Stella Club d'Adjamé	2004, 2005, 2013	
Ivory Coast (19)	3	Issia Wazi FC	2007, 2008, 2010	
Ivory Coast (19)	3	SC Gagnoa	2016, 2017, 2023	
Ivory Coast (19)	2	CO Bouaflé	2004, 2005	
Ivory Coast (19)	2	JC Abidjan	2006, 2009	
Ivory Coast (19)	2	AF Amadou Diallo	2012*, 2027	
Ivory Coast (19)	2	AS Tanda	2017*, 2018	
Ivory Coast (19)	2	RC Abidjan	2021*, 2025	
Ivory Coast (19)	2	AFAD Djékanou	2024, 2026	
Ivory Coast (19)	1	AS Denguélé	2007	
Ivory Coast (19)	1	ES Bingerville	2008	
Ivory Coast (19)	1	SO Armée	2009	
Ivory Coast (19)	1	Williamsville AC	2018*	2018*
Ivory Coast (19)	1	Stade d'Abidjan	2019	
Ivory Coast (19)	1	CO Korhogo	2027	
Kenya (12)	8	Gor Mahia	2009, 2012, 2013, 2018*, **2019***, 2020*, 2021*, 2022	2018*, 2019*
Kenya (12)	3	AFC Leopards	2010, 2014, 2018	
Kenya (12)	2	Sofapaka FC	2011, 2015	
Kenya (12)	2	Bandari	2016, 2020	
Kenya (12)	2	Tusker	2022*, 2027	
Kenya (12)	1	Chemelil Sugar FC	2004	
Kenya (12)	1	Nairobi City Stars	2006	
Kenya (12)	1	Ulinzi Stars	2017	
Kenya (12)	1	Kariobangi Sharks	2019	
Kenya (12)	1	Kakamega Homeboyz	2024	
Kenya (12)	1	Administration Police	2025	
Kenya (12)	1	Nairobi United	2026	2026
Lesotho (1)	1	Bantu	2019*	
Liberia (14)	3	Barrack Young Controllers	2013, 2016, 2017*	
Liberia (14)	3	LISCR	2019, 2020, 2023	
Liberia (14)	2	Monrovia Club Breweries	2017, 2022	
Liberia (14)	1	National Port Authority Anchors	2007	
Liberia (14)	1	Monrovia Black Star	2008	
Liberia (14)	1	Mighty Barrolle	2009	
Liberia (14)	1	Invincible Eleven	2012	
Liberia (14)	1	Red Lions	2014	
Liberia (14)	1	FC Fassell	2015	
Liberia (14)	1	ELWA United	2018	
Liberia (14)	1	LPRC Oilers	2022*	
Liberia (14)	1	Watanga	2024	
Liberia (14)	1	Paynesville	2025	
Liberia (14)	1	Black Man Warrior	2026	
Libya (9)	12	Al-Ittihad	2005, 2008*, **2010***, 2011*, 2015, 2016, 2018, 2019, 2020, 2021, 2022*, 2026	2010, 2022*
Libya (9)	11	Al-Ahli Tripoli	2007, 2009*, 2010, 2014, 2016*, 2019, 2021, 2022, 2023*, 2025, 2027	2016*, 2022
Libya (9)	6	Al-Nasr	2004, 2011, 2013, 2019*, **2020***, 2023	2020*
Libya (9)	4	Al Akhdar	2006, 2008, 2023, 2026	2023
Libya (9)	3	Al-Hilal Beghazi	2017, 2024, 2025	2024
Libya (9)	2	Al-Ahly Benghazi	2009, 2021*	2021*
Libya (9)	1	Khaleej Sirte	2009	
Libya (9)	1	Al Tarsana	2010	
Libya (9)	1	Abu Salim	2024	2024
Madagascar (14)	5	AS Adema	2008, 2009, 2010, 2011, 2016	
Madagascar (14)	5	ASSM Elgeco Plus	2014, 2015, 2017, 2019, 2023	
Madagascar (14)	2	USCA Foot	2005, 2006	
Madagascar (14)	2	CNaPS Sport	2017, 2020	
Madagascar (14)	2	Fosa Juniors	2018, 2020*	
Madagascar (14)	2	Elgeco Plus	2024, 2025	
Madagascar (14)	1	Léopards de Transfoot	2004	
Madagascar (14)	1	USJF Ravinala	2006	
Madagascar (14)	1	AJESAIA	2007	
Madagascar (14)	1	Tana FC	2012	
Madagascar (14)	1	TCO Boeny	2013	
Madagascar (14)	1	CFFA	2022	
Madagascar (14)	1	AS Fanalamanga	2026	
Madagascar (14)	1	Rouge	2027	
Mali (14)	12	Djoliba AC	2008, 2009, 2010, **2012**, 2014, 2015, 2017, 2018, 2019, 2020, 2023*, 2026	2010, 2012, 2018, 2020, 2026
Mali (14)	11	Stade Malien	**2009**, 2010, **2012**, **2013**, 2015, 2016, 2019*, 2021*, 2022*, 2024, 2025	2009, 2012, 2013, 2015, 2024, 2025
Mali (14)	5	Real Bamako	2011, 2012, 2014, 2023, 2027	2014, 2023
Mali (14)	4	Onze Créateurs	2013, 2015, 2017, 2018	
Mali (14)	3	CO Bamako	2010, 2012, 2014	
Mali (14)	2	AS Bamako	2006, 2007	
Mali (14)	1	AS Nianan	2005	
Mali (14)	1	JS Centre Salif Keita	2011	
Mali (14)	1	US Bougouni	2013	
Mali (14)	1	AS Bakaridjan	2016	
Mali (14)	1	USFAS Bamako	2016	
Mali (14)	1	Yeelen Olympique	2021	
Mali (14)	1	Binga FC	2022	
Mali (14)	1	Diarra	2027	
Mauritania (7)	3	ASAC Concorde	2005, 2007, 2022	
Mauritania (7)	3	FC Nouadhibou	2018, 2020*, 2022*	2020*
Mauritania (7)	2	FC Tevragh-Zeina	2011, 2021	
Mauritania (7)	2	Nouakchott King's	2019, 2023	
Mauritania (7)	2	ASC Snim	2020, 2026	
Mauritania (7)	2	AS Douanes Mauritania	2024, 2027	
Mauritania (7)	1	Entente Sebkha	2004	
Mauritius (8)	3	Pamplemousses SC	2010, 2017, 2026	
Mauritius (8)	3	AS Port-Louis 2000	2017, 2018, 2027	
Mauritius (8)	2	Savanne SC	2005, 2005	
Mauritius (8)	2	Petite Rivière Noire SC	2008, 2015	
Mauritius (8)	1	Pointe aux Sables Mates	2006	
Mauritius (8)	1	Curepipe Starlight	2007	
Mauritius (8)	1	AS de Vacoas-Phoenix	2009	
Mauritius (8)	1	Bolton City	2020	
Morocco (17)	9	RS Berkane	2015, **2018**, **2019**, **2020**, 2021, **2022**, 2023, 2024, 2025	2018, 2019, 2020, 2021, 2022, 2024, 2025
Morocco (17)	8	FAR Rabat	2004, **2005***, **2006***, 2010, 2013, 2022, 2023, 2027	2005*, 2006*, 2023
Morocco (17)	7	FUS de Rabat	**2010**, 2011, 2013*, 2015, **2016**, **2017***, 2024	2010, 2013*, 2016, 2017
Morocco (17)	6	Raja Casablanca	2006, 2015*, **2018**, 2019, **2021***, 2027	2018, 2019, 2021*
Morocco (17)	5	Wydad Casablanca	2004, 2007*, 2012, 2013, 2026	2012, 2026
Morocco (17)	5	MAS Fez	2009, **2011**, 2012*, 2014, 2017	2011
Morocco (17)	3	Olympique Khouribga	2005, 2006, 2008	2006
Morocco (17)	3	Hassania Agadir	2007, **2019**, **2020**	2019, 2020
Morocco (17)	2	COD Meknès	2005, 2012	
Morocco (17)	2	Difaâ El Jadidi	2011, 2014	
Morocco (17)	2	IR Tanger	2017, 2019*	
Morocco (17)	1	Rachad Bernoussi	2008	
Morocco (17)	1	Ittihad Khemisset	2009*	
Morocco (17)	1	Kawkab Marrakech	2016	2016
Morocco (17)	1	TAS Casablanca	2021	
Morocco (17)	1	Union de Touarga	2025	
Morocco (17)	1	Olympic Safi	2026	2026
Mozambique (10)	4	Ferroviário de Maputo	2005, 2012, 2024, 2026	
Mozambique (10)	4	Ferroviário da Beira	2006, 2014, 2015, 2023	
Mozambique (10)	4	União Desportiva do Songo	2017, 2018*, 2020*, 2021	2018*
Mozambique (10)	2	Ferroviário de Nampula	2004, 2008	
Mozambique (10)	2	Costa do Sol	2010, 2018	
Mozambique (10)	2	LD Maputo	2013, 2016	
Mozambique (10)	2	Black Bulls	2025, 2027	2025
Mozambique (10)	1	Companhia Têxtil do Punguè	2007	
Mozambique (10)	1	Atlético Muçulmano da Matola	2009	
Mozambique (10)	1	CD Maxaquene	2011	
Namibia (3)	2	African Stars	2014, 2019*	
Namibia (3)	1	Young African	2026	
Namibia (3)	1	UNAM	2027	
Niger (10)	7	Sahel SC	2006, 2007, 2011, 2012, 2013, 2015, 2018	
Niger (10)	3	AS FAN	2009, 2010, 2025	2010
Niger (10)	3	ASN Nigelec	2014, 2023*, 2026	
Niger (10)	3	USGN	2020, 2021, 2022*	
Niger (10)	2	AS GNN	2008, 2019	
Niger (10)	2	AS SONIDEP	2016, 2021*	
Niger (10)	2	Douanes Niamey	2017, 2024^{W}	
Niger (10)	1	Olympic FC	2004	
Niger (10)	1	AS Police	2022	
Niger (10)	1	AS ZAM	2027	
Nigeria (26)	6	Enugu Rangers	2004, 2005, 2013, 2017, 2019, 2020	2004, 2019, 2020
Nigeria (26)	6	Enyimba FC	2010, **2018**, **2020***, **2021***, 2022, 2025	2018, 2020*, 2021*, 2025
Nigeria (26)	5	Rivers United	2017, 2021, 2022*, 2023*, 2024	2017, 2023*, 2024
Nigeria (26)	4	Dolphins FC	**2005**, 2007, 2008, 2015	2005, 2007
Nigeria (26)	4	Warri Wolves	2010, 2012, 2014, 2015	
Nigeria (26)	3	Lobi Stars	2004, 2006, 2013	
Nigeria (26)	3	Heartland FC	2006, 2012, 2013	
Nigeria (26)	3	Kwara United	2007, 2023, 2026	2007
Nigeria (26)	3	Bayelsa United	**2009**, 2014, 2022	2009
Nigeria (26)	2	Nasarawa United	2007, 2016	
Nigeria (26)	2	Wikki Tourists	2008, 2017	
Nigeria (26)	2	Akwa United	2016, 2018	
Nigeria (26)	2	Plateau United	2018*, 2023*	
Nigeria (26)	2	El Kanemi Warriors	2025, 2027	
Nigeria (26)	1	Bendel Insurance	2005	
Nigeria (26)	1	Ocean Boys FC	2009	
Nigeria (26)	1	Sunshine Stars	**2011**	2011
Nigeria (26)	1	Kaduna United	2011	2011
Nigeria (26)	1	Ifeanyi Ubah	2017	
Nigeria (26)	1	MFM	2018*	
Nigeria (26)	1	Niger Tornadoes	2020	
Nigeria (26)	1	Kano Pillars	2021	
Nigeria (26)	1	Remo Stars	2023	
Nigeria (26)	1	Bendel Insurance	2024	
Nigeria (26)	1	Abia Warriors	2026	
Nigeria (26)	1	Shooting Stars	2027	
Réunion (2)	1	Saint-Pauloise FC	2007	
Réunion (2)	1	US Sainte-Marienne	2011	
Rwanda (8)	8	Rayon Sports	2006, 2008, 2015, 2017, **2018***, 2024, 2026, 2027	2018*
Rwanda (8)	5	APR FC	2004, 2005, 2009, 2018, 2022*	
Rwanda (8)	5	AS Kigali	2014, 2020, 2021, 2022, 2023	
Rwanda (8)	3	Police FC	2013, 2016, 2025	
Rwanda (8)	2	SC Kiyovu Sports	2004, 2012	
Rwanda (8)	2	ATRACO FC	2007, 2010	
Rwanda (8)	1	Etincelles FC	2011	
Rwanda (8)	1	Mukura Victory Sports	2019	
São Tomé and Príncipe (1)	1	CD Guadalupe	2013	
Senegal (20)	6	ASC Diaraf	2009, 2010, 2011, 2014, 2019*, **2021**	2021
Senegal (20)	5	Génération Foot	2016, 2018*, 2019, 2020*, 2026	
Senegal (20)	3	Casa Sports	2008, 2012, 2024	
Senegal (20)	2	AS Douanes	2004, 2006	
Senegal (20)	2	Diambars FC	2022, 2027	
Senegal (20)	1	ASC Thiès	2004	
Senegal (20)	1	Dakar UC	2005	
Senegal (20)	1	ASEC Ndiambour	2005	
Senegal (20)	1	CS Sucrière	2006	
Senegal (20)	1	ASC Port Autonome	2006	
Senegal (20)	1	US Gorée	2007	
Senegal (20)	1	US Ouakam	2007	
Senegal (20)	1	ASC Linguère	2008	
Senegal (20)	1	ASC Yakaar	2009	
Senegal (20)	1	Touré Kunda Foot-Pro	2011	
Senegal (20)	1	ASC HLM	2013	
Senegal (20)	1	Olympique de Ngor	2015	
Senegal (20)	1	ASC Niarry Tally	2017	
Senegal (20)	1	Mbour Petite-Côte	2018	
Senegal (20)	1	ASC Jaraaf	2025	2025
Seychelles (11)	4	St Michel United	2007, 2014, 2017, 2023	
Seychelles (11)	3	Anse Réunion	2008, 2013, 2018	
Seychelles (11)	2	Saint Louis Suns United	2004, 2020	
Seychelles (11)	2	Côte d'Or	2015, 2020*	
Seychelles (11)	2	La Passe	2023*, 2024	
Seychelles (11)	2	Foresters	2025, 2026	
Seychelles (11)	1	Red Star FC	2005	
Seychelles (11)	1	Super Magic Brothers	2006	
Seychelles (11)	1	Light Stars	2016	
Seychelles (11)	1	Northern Dynamo	2019	
Seychelles (11)	1	PTL Bazar Brothers	2027	
Sierra Leone (8)	3	FC Kallon	2012, 2023, 2024	
Sierra Leone (8)	2	Ports Authority FC	2007, 2011	
Sierra Leone (8)	2	RSL Armed Forces FC	2014, 2017	
Sierra Leone (8)	2	East End Lions	2025, 2027	
Sierra Leone (8)	1	Mighty Blackpool	2006	
Sierra Leone (8)	1	Central Parade FC	2010	
Sierra Leone (8)	1	Kamboi Eagles	2015	
Sierra Leone (8)	1	Bhantal	2026	
Somalia (3)	4	Horseed	2021, 2022, 2024, 2025	
Somalia (3)	2	Mogadishu City	2020*, 2027	
Somalia (3)	1	Dekedaha	2026	
South Africa (20)	7	Bidvest Wits	2004, 2011, 2015, 2016, 2017, 2018*, 2020	2020
South Africa (20)	7	Supersport United	2005, 2010, 2013, 2014, **2017**, 2018, 2024	2017, 2024
South Africa (20)	5	Kaizer Chiefs	2005, 2014, 2019, 2026, 2027	2026
South Africa (20)	4	Orlando Pirates	2004, **2015**, **2021**, 2022	2015, 2021, 2022
South Africa (20)	4	Mamelodi Sundowns	2007, 2008, 2009, 2016	2007
South Africa (20)	2	Ajax Cape Town	2008, 2016	
South Africa (20)	2	Platinum Stars	2008, 2017	2017
South Africa (20)	2	Cape Town City	2018, 2023*	
South Africa (20)	2	Sekhukhune United	2024, 2025	2024
South Africa (20)	2	Stellenbosch	2025, 2026	2025, 2026
South Africa (20)	1	Santos FC	2004	2004
South Africa (20)	1	Moroka Swallows	2010	
South Africa (20)	1	Black Leopards	2012	
South Africa (20)	1	Free State Stars	2019	
South Africa (20)	1	TS Galaxy	2020	
South Africa (20)	1	Bloemfontein Celtic	2021	
South Africa (20)	1	Tshakuma Tsha Madzivhandila	2022	
South Africa (20)	1	Royal AM	2023	
South Africa (20)	1	Marumo Gallants	2023	2023
South Africa (20)	1	Durban City	2027	
South Sudan (11)	3	Al-Merreikh Juba	2019, 2024, 2026	
South Sudan (11)	2	Al-Ghazal	2015, 2027	
South Sudan (11)	2	Atlabara	2016, 2022	
South Sudan (11)	1	El-Nasir	2013	
South Sudan (11)	1	Al-Malakia	2014	
South Sudan (11)	1	Wau Salaam	2017	
South Sudan (11)	1	Al-Hilal Juba	2018	
South Sudan (11)	1	Amarat United	2020	
South Sudan (11)	1	Al Rabita	2021	
South Sudan (11)	1	Al Hilal Wau	2023	
South Sudan (11)	1	Jamus	2025	
Sudan (16)	9	Al-Ahly Shendi	2012, 2013, 2014, 2015, 2016, 2017, 2018, 2019, 2020	2012
Sudan (16)	8	Al-Merrikh	2004, 2005, 2006, **2007**, 2008, 2010, **2012**, 2016	2007, 2008, 2012
Sudan (16)	6	Al-Hilal	2004, 2006, **2010**, **2012**, 2018*, **2019***	2004, 2010, 2012, 2018*, 2019*
Sudan (16)	6	Al Khartoum SC	2010, 2011, 2013, 2015, 2016, 2020	
Sudan (16)	4	Al-Hilal Al-Ubayyid	**2017**, 2018, 2019, 2021	2017
Sudan (16)	3	Alamal Atbara	2010, 2012, 2021	
Sudan (16)	2	Hay Al-Arab SC	2009, 2024^{W}	
Sudan (16)	2	Hilal Alsahil	2023, 2027	
Sudan (16)	2	Al Ahli Madani	2026, 2027	
Sudan (16)	1	Al Neel Al-Hasahisa	2011	
Sudan (16)	1	Al-Ahli Atbara	2014	
Sudan (16)	1	Hay Al-Wadi SC	2022	
Sudan (16)	1	Al-Ahli Merowe	2022	
Sudan (16)	1	Al-Ahli Khartoum	2023	
Sudan (16)	1	Haidoub	2024	
Sudan (16)	1	Al Zamala	2026	
Tanzania (13)	10	Azam FC	2013, 2014, 2016, 2017, 2020, 2022, 2023, 2024, 2026, 2027	2026
Tanzania (13)	9	Young Africans	2007, 2008, 2011, 2015, 2016, 2017, 2018*, 2020*, 2023*	2016, 2018*, 2023*
Tanzania (13)	7	Simba SC	2007, 2010, 2011, 2012, 2018, 2022*, 2025	2022*, 2025
Tanzania (13)	2	Mtibwa Sugar FC	2004, 2019	
Tanzania (13)	2	Prisons FC	2005, 2009	
Tanzania (13)	2	Singida Black Stars	2026, 2027	2026
Tanzania (13)	1	Moro United	2006	
Tanzania (13)	1	KMC	2020	
Tanzania (13)	1	Namungo	2021	2021
Tanzania (13)	1	Biashara United	2022	
Tanzania (13)	1	Geita Gold	2023	
Tanzania (13)	1	Singida Fountain Gate	2024	
Tanzania (13)	1	Coastal Union	2025	
Togo (10)	5	ASC Kara	2020*, 2022, 2023, 2024, 2025	
Togo (10)	3	Dynamic Togolais	2004, 2006, 2011	
Togo (10)	3	AS Douanes	2005, 2013, 2014	
Togo (10)	2	AS Togo-Port	2007, 2015	
Togo (10)	2	Maranatha FC	2007, 2020	
Togo (10)	2	ASKO Kara	2023*, 2027	2023*
Togo (10)	1	US Masséda	2008	
Togo (10)	1	Gomido	2019	
Togo (10)	1	UFC Sokodé	2021	
Togo (10)	1	AS Gbohloé-Su	2026	
Tunisia (14)	15	CS Sfaxien	**2007**, **2008**, 2009, **2010**, 2012, **2013**, 2015, **2017**, **2019**, 2020, **2021***, 2022, 2023, 2025, 2027	2007, 2008, 2010, 2013, 2015, 2017, 2019, 2021*, 2022, 2025
Tunisia (14)	11	Étoile du Sahel	**2006**, **2008**, 2010, 2011, 2013, 2014, 2015, **2016**, **2019**, 2021, 2026	2006, 2008, 2013, 2014, 2015, 2016, 2019, 2021
Tunisia (14)	9	Club Africain	2004, 2008, **2011**, 2012, 2015, **2017**, 2018, 2023, 2024	2008, 2011, 2017, 2024
Tunisia (14)	4	Stade Tunisien	2004, 2009, 2025, 2026	
Tunisia (14)	4	Espérance de Tunis	2006, 2008, 2015, 2016	2006, 2015
Tunisia (14)	3	US Ben Guerdane	2018, 2020, 2022	
Tunisia (14)	2	ES Zarzis	2006, 2027	
Tunisia (14)	2	EGS Gafsa	2007, 2009	
Tunisia (14)	2	Olympique Béja	2011, 2024	
Tunisia (14)	2	CA Bizertin	**2013**, 2014	2013
Tunisia (14)	2	US Monastir	2021, 2023*	2023*
Tunisia (14)	1	AS Marsa	2005	2005
Tunisia (14)	1	JS Kairouan	2005	
Tunisia (14)	1	Stade Gabèsien	2016	
Uganda (11)	7	KCCA	2005, 2009, 2017, 2019, 2020*, 2021, 2024	2017
Uganda (11)	3	Uganda Revenue Authority SC	2006, 2015, 2022	
Uganda (11)	2	Express FC	2004, 2008	
Uganda (11)	2	Victors FC	2009, 2011	
Uganda (11)	2	Vipers SC	2017, 2019*	
Uganda (11)	2	Kitara	2025, 2027	
Uganda (11)	1	SC Victoria University	2014	
Uganda (11)	1	SC Villa	2016	
Uganda (11)	1	Proline	2020	
Uganda (11)	1	Bul	2023	
Uganda (11)	1	NEC FC	2026	
Zambia (12)	9	ZESCO United	2006, 2010, 2011, 2014, **2017**, 2019*, 2023, 2025, 2026	2017, 2019*, 2026
Zambia (12)	6	Green Buffaloes	2004, 2005, 2007, 2008, 2018, 2019	
Zambia (12)	5	Red Arrows	2005, 2009, 2012, 2022, 2027	
Zambia (12)	5	Zanaco	2010, 2016, 2018*, **2020**, 2022*	2010, 2020
Zambia (12)	4	Nkana	2014, 2018, **2019***, 2021*	2014, 2019*, 2021*
Zambia (12)	3	Green Eagles	2019, 2020*, 2021	
Zambia (12)	2	Power Dynamos	2013, 2015	
Zambia (12)	1	Nchanga Rangers	2011	
Zambia (12)	1	Buildcon	2020	
Zambia (12)	1	NAPSA Stars	2021	2021
Zambia (12)	1	Kabew Warriors FC	2022	
Zambia (12)	1	Maestro United	2024	
Zanzibar (14)	3	JKU SC	2006, 2016, 2024	
Zanzibar (14)	3	KMKM FC	2011, 2026, 2027	
Zanzibar (14)	2	Kipanga FC	2005, 2023	
Zanzibar (14)	2	Mundu SC	2007, 2009	
Zanzibar (14)	2	KVZ SC	2017, 2021	
Zanzibar (14)	2	Zimamoto	2018, 2019	
Zanzibar (14)	1	Chipukizi FC	2008	
Zanzibar (14)	1	Miembeni SC	2010	
Zanzibar (14)	1	Jamhuri FC	2012	
Zanzibar (14)	1	Chuoni FC	2014	
Zanzibar (14)	1	Polisi SC	2015	
Zanzibar (14)	1	Malindi	2020	
Zanzibar (14)	1	Mafunzpo	2022	
Zanzibar (14)	1	Uhamiaji	2025	
Zimbabwe (12)	3	Dynamos FC	2004, 2012, 2025	
Zimbabwe (12)	2	Highlanders FC	2008, 2011	
Zimbabwe (12)	2	CAPS United	2009, 2010	
Zimbabwe (12)	2	FC Platinum	2015, 2021*	
Zimbabwe (12)	1	Mwana Africa	2007	
Zimbabwe (12)	1	Lengthens FC	2010	
Zimbabwe (12)	1	Motor Action FC	2012	
Zimbabwe (12)	1	Hwange Colliery FC	2012	
Zimbabwe (12)	1	How Mine FC	2014	
Zimbabwe (12)	1	Harare City	2016	
Zimbabwe (12)	1	Ngezi Platinum	2017	
Zimbabwe (12)	1	Triangle United	2020	

Teams in bold qualified for the knockout phase (2004-2008 for final, 2009-2016 for semi-finals, since 2017 for quarter-finals).
Years marked with *: transferred from Champions League.

=== Records ===
Last updated after 2024-25 group stage Matchday 6
Most titles: 3
CS Sfaxien (Tunisia) in 2007, 2008, 2013
RS Berkane (Morocco) in 2020, 2022, 2025

Teams winning on debut: 5
Étoile du Sahel (Tunisia) 2006
CS Sfaxien (Tunisia) 2007
Stade Malien (Mali) 2009
FUS Rabat (Morocco) 2010

Successive title wins: 2
CS Sfaxien (Tunisia) 2007, 2008
TP Mazembe (Democratic Republic of the Congo) 2016, 2017

Most appearances: 14
CS Sfaxien (Tunisia) (2007-2010, 2012, 2013, 2015, 2017, 2019-2023, 2025)

Most consecutive appearances: 9
Al-Ahly Shendi (Sudan) (2012-2020)

Most consecutive matches without losing: 13
Étoile du Sahel (Tunisia) recorded best undefeated streak through two seasons: 2006 (10 games) and 2008 (3 games)

Undefeated through whole season:
Étoile du Sahel (Tunisia) 2006 in 10 games (8-2-0 record)

Most goals scored in a season: 34
SuperSport United (South Africa) 2017
Raja Casablanca (Morocco) 2018

Most goals conceded in a season: 25
105 Libreville (Gabon) 2005

Biggest win: 11 goals margin
US Bitam (Gabon) - Desportivo de Guadalupe (São Tomé and Príncipe) 12-1 (2 March 2013)

Biggest aggregate win: 16 goals margin
US Bitam (Gabon) - Desportivo de Guadalupe (São Tomé and Príncipe) 17-1 (0-5, 12-1; 17 February, 2 March 2013)

Most goals scored in a single game: 13
US Bitam (Gabon) - Desportivo de Guadalupe (São Tomé and Príncipe) 12-1 (2 March 2013)

Top goalscorer in a single season: 15
Abdelmalek Ziaya (Algeria) 2009

==== Group stage records ====
Most group stage appearances: 10
CS Sfaxien (Tunisia) (2007, 2008, 2010, 2013, 2015, 2017, 2019, 2021, 2022, 2025)

Most consecutive group stage appearances: 6
Étoile du Sahel (Tunisia) (2013-2016, 2019, 2021)

Most consecutive group stage appearances in successive editions: 5
RS Berkane (Morocco) (2018-2022)

Most times advanced past group stage: 7
CS Sfaxien (Tunisia)

Most time advanced past group stage as group winners: 6
RS Berkane (Morocco)

Most times eliminated in group stage: 4
ASEC Mimosas (Ivory Coast) (2011, 2014, 2018, 2022)

Most times qualified to group stage but failed to go past it: 3
Haras El Hodoud (Egypt)

Most group stage matches played: 60
CS Sfaxien (Tunisia)

Most group stage matches won: 25
CS Sfaxien (Tunisia)

Most appearances without group stage qualification: 7
Sahel SC (Niger)

Most teams from one nation/league: 24
Nigeria Premier League; eleven teams qualified only once, eight teams managed to qualify to the group stage and five to the knockout stages.

Fewest teams from one nation/league: 0
No teams played in the competition from the following associations. The only leagues without Confederation Cup representative (2004-):
(Cape Verde) Cape Verdean Football Championship
(Eritrea) Eritrean Premier League

Undefeated through group stage:
The following teams went undefeated through the group stage, with CS Sfaxien being the only team to achieve this feat three times and FAR Rabat, RS Berkane and Zamalek twice each.
FAR Rabat (Morocco) 2005 (5-1-0) and 2023 (4-2-0)
Dolphins (Nigeria) 2005 (4-2-0)
Étoile du Sahel (Tunisia) 2006 (6-0-0 joint record)
Maghreb de Fès (Morocco) 2011 (4-2-0)
Al-Merreikh (Sudan) 2012 (4-2-0)
CS Sfaxien (Tunisia) 2013 (4-2-0), 2019 (3-3-0) and 2021 (2-4-0)
FUS Rabat (Morocco) 2016 (3-3-0)
TP Mazembe (Democratic Republic of the Congo) 2017 (3-3-0)
SuperSport United (South Africa) 2017 (2-4-0)
Al-Masry (Egypt) 2018 (3-3-0)
Horoya (Guinea) 2020 (4-2-0)
Zanaco (Zambia) 2020 (2-4-0)
Raja Casablanca (Morocco) 2021 (6-0-0 joint record)
JS Kabylie (Algeria) 2021 (3-3-0)
RS Berkane (Morocco) 2024 (4-2-0) and 2025 (5-1-0)
Zamalek (Egypt) 2024 (5-1-0) and 2025 (4-2-0)
USM Alger (Algeria) 2025 (4-2-0)

Winless in group stage:
The following teams went winless through the group stage with no teams doing it more than once.
Fello Star (Guinea) 2005 (0-0-6 joint record)
ASFAN (Niger) 2010 (0-2-4)
Haras El Hodoud (Egypt) 2010 (0-3-3)
JS Kabylie (Algeria) 2011 (0-0-6 joint record)
Stade Malien (Mali) 2012 (0-3-3)
ASEC (Ivory Coast) 2014 (0-3-3)
CS Sfaxien (Tunisia) 2015 (0-2-4)
Al-Ahli Tripoli (Libya) 2016 (0-2-4)
Platinum Stars (South Africa) 2017 (0-3-3)
CF Mounana (Gabon) 2017 (0-0-6 joint record)
UD Songo (Mozambique) 2018 (0-3-3)
Al-Hilal (Sudan) 2018 (0-3-3)
Salitas (Burkina Faso) 2019 (0-4-2)
FC San Pédro (Ivory Coast) 2020 (0-3-3)
FC Nouadhibou (Mauritania) 2020 (0-2-4)
Bidvest Wits (South Africa) 2020 (0-2-4)
ESAE (Benin) 2020 (0-1-5)
Namungo (Tanzania) 2021 (0-0-6 joint record)
Coton Sport (Cameroon) 2022 (0-3-3)
Royal Leopards (Eswatini) 2022 (0-0-6 joint record)
Motema Pembe (Democratic Republic of the Congo) 2023 (0-3-3)
Académie SOAR (Guinea) 2024 (0-1-5)
Académica do Lobito (Angola) 2024 (0-1-5)
Diables Noirs (Republic of the Congo) 2024 (0-2-4)
Orapa United (Botswana) 2025 (0-2-4)

All 6 wins in group stage:
Étoile du Sahel (Tunisia) 2006
Raja Casablanca (Morocco) 2021

All 6 losses in group stage:
Fello Star (Guinea) 2005
JS Kabylie (Algeria) 2011
CF Mounana (Gabon) 2017
Namungo (Tanzania) 2021
Royal Leopards (Eswatini) 2022

Most goals scored in group stage (single season): 15
Étoile du Sahel (Tunisia) 2006
Orlando Pirates (South Africa) 2022

Most goals scored in group stage (total): 70
CS Sfaxien (Tunisia)

Most goals conceded in group stage (single season) 18:
Royal Leopards (Eswatini) 2022

Most goals conceded in group stage (total): 39
Étoile du Sahel (Tunisia)

Fewest goals scored in group stage: 0
Namungo (Tanzania) 2021, 0-9 goal difference
Académie SOAR (Guinea) 2024, 0-12 goal difference

Fewest goals conceded in group stage: 0
Raja Casablanca (Morocco) 2021, 13-0 goal difference

Best goal difference in group stage: +13
Raja Casablanca (Morocco) 2021, 13-0 goal difference

Worst goal difference in group stage: -13
ESAE (Benin) 2020, 1-14 goal difference
Royal Leopards (Eswatini) 2022 5-18 goal difference

Biggest win in a group stage match: 6 goals margin
Ismaily (Egypt) - FC 105 (Gabon) 6-0 (25 September 2005)
ES Sétif (Algeria) - Santos (Angola) 6-0 (28 August 2009)
Raja Casablanca (Morocco) - Aduana Stars (Ghana) 6-0 (29 August 2018)
Pyramids (Egypt) - FC Nouadhibou (Mauritania) 6-0 (8 December 2019)
USM Alger (Algeria) - Orapa United (Botswana) 6-0 (27 November 2024)

Most goals scored in a group stage match: 8
CF Mounana (Gabon) - SuperSport United (South Africa) 3-5 (23 May 2017)
RS Berkane (Morocco) - USGN (Niger) 5-3 (13 February 2022)
Royal Leopards (Eswatini) - Orlando Pirates (South Africa) 2-6 (27 February 2022)
