= Ibrahim Hilika =

Zanzibarian footballer (born 1994)

Personal information
- Full name: Ibrahim Hamad Ahmada Hilika
- Date of birth: 7 April 1994 (age 32)
- Place of birth: Stone Town, Zanzibar, Tanzania
- Position: Striker

Team information
- Current team: TRA United

Senior career*
Years	Team	Apps	(Gls)
2014–2024	Zimamoto		
2017–2018	→ OC Bukavu Dawa (loan)		
2018–2019	→ Young Africans (loan)		
2020–2022	→ Mtibwa Sugar (loan)	10+	(0+)
2022–2023	→ Polisi Tanzania (loan)	12	(1)
2024–	TRA United (Note: The club was known as Tabora United until 2025.)	13	(0)

International career^{‡}
2015–	Zanzibar	14	(2)
- * Club domestic league appearances and goals as of 23:24, 27 July 2026 (UTC) ‡ National team caps and goals as of 09:42, 13 March 2025 (UTC)

Ibrahim Hamad Ahmada Hilika (born 7 April 1994) is a Zanzibarian professional footballer who plays as a striker for Tanzanian Premier League club TRA United and the Zanzibar national team.

== Club career ==
Hilika began his club career at Zimamoto in 2014 and played regularly until 2017 when he was loaned out to Linafoot club OC Bukavu Dawa. He was subsequently loaned out to Young Africans, Mtibwa Sugar, and Polisi Tanzania. On 9 March 2020, he scored a hat-trick for Zimamoto during the 3–0 victory against Chuoni.

He left Zimamoto in 2024 and joined Tabora United (now TRA United) during the 2024–25 season. He played both games for the club during the 2026 Mapinduzi Cup whilst only playing two league matches for the club during the 2025–26 season.

== International career ==
Hilika debuted for Zanzibar on 21 November 2015 during the 1–0 loss against Burundi during the 2015 CECAFA Cup group stage. He also played during the 2017 CECAFA Cup, where he scored his first goal for Zanzibar during the 2–1 victory against Tanzania on 7 December 2017, and eventually finished as a runner-up, and the 2019 CECAFA Cup.

He returned to the Zanzibar national team to play at the 2025 Mapinduzi Cup and he scored the opening goal in the final.

Hilika was named in the preliminary squad for the Tanzania national team ahead of the 2024 African Nations Championship, but he was omitted from the final roster.

== Career statistics ==
=== International ===
As of match played 13 January 2025.

Appearances and goals by national team and year
National team	Year	Apps	Goals
Zanzibar	2015	2	0
Zanzibar	2016	—	
Zanzibar	2017	6	1
Zanzibar	2018	—	
Zanzibar	2019	2	0
Zanzibar	2020	—	
Zanzibar	2021	—	
Zanzibar	2022	—	
Zanzibar	2023	0	0
Zanzibar	2024	—	
Zanzibar	2025	4	1
Total		14	2

Zanzibar score listed first, score column indicates score after each Hilika goal.

No.	Date	Venue	Opponent	Score	Result	Competition
1.	7 December 2017	Kenyatta Stadium, Machakos, Kenya	Tanzania	2–1	2–1	2017 CECAFA Cup
2.	13 January 2025	Gombani Stadium, Zanzibar	Burkina Faso	1–0	2–1	2025 Mapinduzi Cup

== Honours ==
Zimamoto

- Zanzibar Premier League: 2015–16; runner-up 2016–17, 2019–20, 2023–24

Young Africans

- Tanzanian Premier League: runner-up 2018–19

Zanzibar

- CECAFA Cup: runner-up 2017
- Mapinduzi Cup: 2025
