= Mapinduzi Cup =

Association football tournament

- Organiser(s): Zanzibar Football Federation
- Founded: 2004
- Teams: 10 (2026)
- Current champions: Young Africans (3rd title)
- Most championships: Azam FC (5 titles)
- 2026 Mapinduzi Cup

The Mapinduzi Cup is a top knockout football tournament in Zanzibar. Mapinduzi means Revolution in Swahili, in recognition of the Zanzibar Revolution. The Mapinduzi Cup is a tournament created by the Zanzibar Football Federation to commemorate Zanzibar's Revolution day which is marked annually on 12 January.

The defending champions are Young Africans.

== History ==
The first edition of the cup was in 2004. However, the cup was played between Zanzibari clubs together with clubs from Tanzania mainland until 2024. Since 2013 clubs from Kenya and Uganda have been invited to take part occasionally.

Along with the Zanzibari Cup and Nyerere Cup, the three tournaments are the three main knockout tournaments in Zanzibar. The maiden edition was won by Jamhuri F.C.

The 2025 edition of the tournament became the first to involve national teams instead of clubs.

== Champions ==
Year	Winners	Results	Runner-ups	Ref.
2004	Young Africans SC	2–1	Mtibwa Sugar	
2005	Mafunzo FC	2–0	JKU SC	
2006	not held			
2007	Malindi SC	2–0	Miembeni SC	
2008	Miembeni SC	2–1	Polisi SC	
2009	not held			
2010	Mtibwa Sugar	1–0	Ocean View FC	
2011	Simba SC	2–0	Young Africans SC	
2012	Azam FC	3–1	Jamhuri	
2013	Azam FC	2–1	Tusker FC	
2014	Kampala City Council	1–0	Simba SC	
2015	Simba SC	0–0 (4–3 pen.)	Mtibwa Sugar	
2016	Uganda Revenue Authority	3–1	Mtibwa Sugar	
2017	Azam FC	1–0	Simba SC	
2018	Azam FC	0–0 (4–3 pen.)	Uganda Revenue Authority	
2019	Azam FC	2–1	Simba SC	
2020	Mtibwa Sugar	1–0	Simba SC	
2021	Young Africans	0–0 (4–3 pen.)	Simba SC	
2022	Simba SC	1–0	Azam FC	
2023	Mlandege FC	2–1	Singida Big Stars	
2024	Mlandege FC	1–0	Simba SC	
2025	Zanzibar	2–1	Burkina Faso	

== Winner by team ==
Club	Number	Years
Azam FC	5	2012, 2013, 2017, 2018, 2019
Simba	3	2011, 2015, 2022
Young Africans	3	2004, 2021, 2026
Mtibwa Sugar	2	2010, 2020
Mlandege FC	2	2023, 2024
Mafunzo FC	1	2005
Malindi SC	1	2007
Miembeni SC	1	2008
Kampala City Council	1	2014
Uganda Revenue Authority	1	2016
Zanzibar	1	2025
