= List of football clubs in Zanzibar =

Following is a list of football clubs located in Zanzibar.

== A ==
- Al-Azar
- Azimio

== B ==
- Bambuu S.C.
- Black Mamba
- Black Sailor
- Baharia F.C.
- Black Lion F.C.
- Bridge Star

== C ==
- Chipukizi F.C.
- Chake Chake
- Cairo United

== D ==
- Dynamo
- Desi

== E ==
- Eleven Stars
- El-Gado

== F ==
- Fufuni S.C.

== G ==
- Gold Star F.C.

== H ==
- Hard Rock S.C.

== I ==
- Inter Zanzibar
- Imara

== J ==
- Jamhuri F.C. (Pemba)
- Jamhuri S.C. (Unguja)
- JKU F.C.
- Junguni
- Jang'ombe Boys

== K ==
- KMKM S.C.
- Kikwajuni
- Kipanga F.C.
- Kisiwani F.C.
- Kundemba F.C.
- Konde Star
- Kilimani City
- Kilimani Fighters
- Kizimbani
- Kifumbi Kai
- Kianga Inter
- KVZ S.C.

== M ==
- Mafunzo F.C.
- Malindi F.C.
- Miembeni S.C.
- Mundu F.C.
- Mlandege F.C.
- Machomane
- Maendeleo F.C.
- Milla
- Mgogoni
- Mkoroshoni
- Mwenge
- Muembe Makumbi City
- Muembe Makumbi United
- Mbweni Academy
- Mchangani F.C.
- Mbuzini

== N ==
- New City F.C.
- New King
- New Stone Town
- Ngome F.C.
- Negro United
- New Boys F.C.
- New Power
- Nyangobo

== P ==
- Paje Stars
- Polisi S.C.
- Pangani

== R ==
- Raskazone

== S ==
- Shangani F.C.
- Sharp Boys
- Sulubu F.C.
- Super Star F.C.
- Small Simba
- Super Falcon

== T ==
- Taifa ya Jang'ombe
- Tekeleza
- Tibirinzi

== U ==
- Uhamiaji F.C.
- Ujamaa F.C.
- U/Mbuzini
- Union Rangers
- Umoja wa Mazizini

== V ==
- Villa F.C.

== W ==
- Wawi Star

== Y ==
- Yosso Boys

== Z ==
- Zanzibar Ocean View
- Zimamoto F.C.
