= Ibrahim Hamad =

Tanzanian footballer

Personal information
- Birth name: Ibrahim Abdallah Hamad
- Date of birth: 12 November 1997 (age 28)
- Place of birth: Zanzibar City, Tanzania
- Height: 1.77 m (5 ft 9 1/2 in)
- Position: Centre-back

Team information
- Current team: Young Africans
- Number: 4

Senior career*
Years	Team	Apps	(Gls)
2017–2019	Jang'ombe Boys		
2019–2021	Malindi		
2021–2022	KMKM		
2022–	Young Africans	63	(5)

International career
2017–	Zanzibar	5	(0)
2023–	Tanzania	27	(0)
- * Club domestic league appearances and goals

Ibrahim Abdallah Hamad (born 12 November 1997), sometimes known as Ibrahim Bacca, is a Tanzanian professional footballer who plays as a centre-back for Young Africans. He has played for both the non-FIFA recognized Zanzibar national team, and for the recognized Tanzania national team.

== Career ==
Hamad began his senior career with the Zanzibar Premier League club Jang'ombe Boys in 2017. In 2019, he moved to Malindi for 2 season. In 2021, he spent a season with KMKM where he won the 2021–22 Zanzibar Premier League. on 14 January 2022, he joined the Tanzanian Premier League club Young Africans where he won 2 consecutive leagues, 1 Tanzania FA Cup and 1 Tanzania Community Shield. In November 2023 he extended his contract with Young Africans until 2027, and after a strong performance against Al Ahly FC in the CAF Champions League a special day was inaugurated by his club and Zanzibar locals called "Bacca Day".

== International ==
Hamad was first called up to the Zanzibar national team for the 2017 CECAFA Cup, where they finished in the second place.

He was first called up to the Tanzania national team for a 1–0 2023 Africa Cup of Nations qualification win over Uganda on 24 March 2023. He made the final squad for Tanzania at the 2023 Africa Cup of Nations.

== Personal life ==
Hamad is a devout Muslim. His best friend died during the sinking of MV Spice Islander I in 2011. Hamad worked as a potato chip cutter when he was a young adult to prove to his parents that he could work. He was also a part of Zanzibar's military service.

== Honours ==
KMKM

- Zanzibar Premier League: 2021–22

Young Africans

- Tanzanian Premier League: 2021–22, 2022–23
- Tanzania FA Cup: 2021–22
- Tanzania Community Shield: 2022
