= 2022–23 Zanzibar Premier League =

Zanzibar Premier League
- Season: 2022–23
- Champions: KMKM
- Champions League: KMKM
- Confederation Cup: JKU
- Matches played: 239
- Goals scored: 513 (2.15 per match)

The 2022—23 Zanzibar Premier League was a season of top-flight football in Zanzibar, a semi-autonomous region of Tanzania which is an associate member of CAF. The season started on 2nd September 2022.

KMKM won their third consecutive title and seventh overall to tie Mlandege for the record number of times won. KMKM had a four-point lead with four games to play and were able to maintain the title pace.

== League Table ==
Pos	Team	Pld	W	D	L	GF	GA	GD	Pts	Qualification or relegation
1	KMKM (C)	30	21	6	3	54	12	+42	69	Qualification to the 2023–24 CAF Champions League
2	KVZ (Note: No result for KVZ-Dulla Boys in round 30, game possibly not played)	29	19	8	2	39	15	+24	65	
3	Mlandege	30	16	5	9	38	26	+12	53	
4	Malindi	30	14	7	9	29	24	+5	49	
5	Zimamoto	30	13	6	11	36	30	+6	45	
6	JKU	30	11	11	8	37	25	+12	44	Qualification to the 2023–24 CAF Confederation Cup
7	Uhamiaji	30	12	8	10	33	29	+4	44	
8	Kipanga	30	11	9	10	39	40	−1	42	
9	Kundemba	30	11	8	11	25	27	−2	41	
10	Chipukizi	30	10	10	10	22	22	0	40	
11	Mafunzo	30	11	7	12	37	38	−1	40	
12	Jamhuri	30	9	13	8	25	27	−2	40	
13	Black Sailors (R)	30	9	6	15	32	35	−3	33	Relegation
14	Polisi (R)	30	4	8	18	20	44	−24	20	Relegation
15	Taifa Jang'ombe (R)	30	4	4	22	21	52	−31	16	Relegation
16	Dulla Boys (Note: No result for KVZ-Dulla Boys in round 30, game possibly not played) (R)	29	2	8	19	26	67	−41	14	Relegation

Source: RSSSF
Rules for classification: 1) points; 2) goal difference; 3) number of goals scored.
(C) Champions; (R) Relegated
