= Zanzibar Football Federation =

Governing body for football in Zanzibar

CAF
- Short name: ZFF
- Founded: 1926
- Headquarters: Zanzibar City
- FIFA affiliation: None
- CAF affiliation: 2004 (associate member)
- President: Seif Kombo Pandu
- Website: https://zanzibar-fa.com/

The Zanzibar Football Federation (ZFF) (previously known as Zanzibar Football Association) (Swahili: Shirikisho la Mpira wa Miguu Zanzibar) is the governing football Federation for Zanzibar, Africa.

The ZFA were an associate member of the African governing body, the Confederation of African Football. Following a rejection from FIFA in 2005, the ZFA were removed from CAF and after much lobbying were reinstated as an associate member. This meant that the club sides associated with the ZFA can participate in the continental club competitions organised by CAF but the Zanzibar national team could not. The ZFA are not entitled to vote in CAF affairs due to their associate member status. Players from Zanzibar are eligible to play in international competition for the Tanzania team, the representative of the sovereign territory.

As a nation state, it has competed in regional competitions since 1949. It currently competes in CECAFA organised tournaments.

The ZFA was admitted as a full member of the CAF in March 2017 but lost membership four months later.

In March 2017, the Zanzibar Football Association voted on whether to change their name to Zanzibar Football Federation, which succeeded.

== Continental representation ==
Season	CAF Champions League	CAF Confederation Cup
2006	Polisi	JKU SC
2007	Miembeni SC	Chipukizi
2008	Miembeni SC	Mundu
2009	Miembeni SC	Mundu
2010	Mafunzo FC	Miembeni SC

== Football stadiums in Zanzibar ==
Stadium	Capacity	City
Amaan Stadium	15,000	Zanzibar City
