= Mohamed Abdallah Golo =

Tanzanian footballer

Personal information
- Date of birth: 14 May 1976 (age 50)
- Position: Forward

Senior career*
Years	Team	Apps	(Gls)
–2002	Mlandege		
2002–2003	Young Africans		
2004–2005	Miembeni		

International career^{‡}
2000	Tanzania	1	(0)
2002–2009	Zanzibar	7	(1)
- * Club domestic league appearances and goals as of 22 April 2021 ‡ National team caps and goals as of 22 April 2021

Mohamed Abdallah Golo (born 14 May 1976) is a retired Tanzanian football striker.
