= Zanzibari Cup =

Top knockout football tournament in Zanzibar

The Zanzibari Cup is the top knockout football tournament in Zanzibar.

The first edition of the cup was in 1926. However, the cup was rarely played, as Zanzibari clubs usually participate in the Nyerere Cup or the Mapinduzi Cup together with clubs from Tanzania mainland.

A Zanzibari FA Cup was organized starting from 2019, with the winners qualifying for the CAF Confederation Cup.

== Winners ==
- 1926: Mnazi Mmoja 1–0 New Kings
- 1931: PWD
- 1994: Malindi
- 2005: Final between Mafunzo and Chipukizi (unknown winner)
- 2019: Malindi 0–0 (4–2 pen.) JKU
- 2020: abandoned
- 2021: Mafunzo 1–1 (4–3 pen.) KVZ
- 2022: Kipanga 1–0 Chipukizi
- 2023: JKU 2–0 Chipukizi
- 2024: Chipukizi 2–0 (awd) JKU
