= 2017–18 Zanzibar Premier League =

Zanzibar Premier League
- Season: 2017–18
- Champions: JKU

The 2017–18 Zanzibar Premier League season was the top tier of Zanzibar Premier League football competition in Zanzibar.

JKU SCZ successfully pursued its 2018 title.

== Qualifying stage ==
=== Kanda ya Unguja (Unguja Region) ===
After 12 rounds (31 January 2018):

=== Kanda ya Pemba (Pemba Region) ===
After 22 rounds (9 April 2018):

== Championship playoff ==
Qualified teams:

- Unguja (top four teams): JKU, KVZ, Mafunzo, Zimamoto
- Pemba (top four teams): Hardrock, Jamhuri, Mwenge, Opec

=== Standings ===
Final table.

1. JKU SCZ               14  10  3  1     33-15  33 Champions
2. Zimamoto SC           14  10  2  2     21-9  32
3. KVZ SC                14      8  5  1  23-7   29
4. Mwenge (Wete)         14      5  3  6  19-19  18
5. Mafunzo SC            14      4  3  7  12-13  15
6. Hard Rock             14      3  3  8  12-25  12
7. Jamhuri               14      2  5  7  11-19  11
8. Opec                  14      2  0  12 17-41  6
