= 2026 Mapinduzi Cup =

International football tournament

NMB Mapinduzi Cup

Tournament details
- Host country: Zanzibar
- Dates: 28–13 January 2026
- Teams: 16 (from 1 confederation)
- Venues: 2 (in 1 host city)

Final positions
- Champions: (Tanzania) Young Africans (3rd title)
- Runners-up: (Tanzania) Azam

Tournament statistics
- Matches played: 14
- Goals scored: 30 (2.14 per match)
- Top scorer(s): Joseph Kitambala (2 goal)
- Best player: Maxi Nzengeli
- Best young player: Arogasti
- Best goalkeeper: Aishi Manula
- All statistics correct as of Complete.

The 2026 Mapinduzi Cup is the 20th season of the international association football friendly tournament that took place in Zanzibar. It is sponsored by NMB Bank and known as the NMB Mapinduzi Cup for sponsorship reasons. It contested by 10 teams. The tournament starting on 28 December 2025. The final played at Gombani Stadium on 13 January 2026.

== Background ==
This year's edition will return to the traditional clubs format unlike last season when competition featured national teams,

== Venue ==
All matches are played at Amaan Stadium except the final match which will be at Gombani Stadium.

== Participants Clubs ==
The following ten teams will contest in the tournament.

- (Zanzibar) Fufuni FC
- (Tanzania) Azam
- (Zanzibar) KVZ
- (Tanzania) TRA United
- (Zanzibar) Mlandege
- (Tanzania) Singida Black Stars
- (Zanzibar) Muembe Makumbi City
- (Tanzania) Simba
- (Uganda) URA
- (Tanzania) Young Africans

== Group stage ==
Tie-breaking criteria for group play
The ranking of teams in each group was based on the following criteria:
1. Number of points obtained in games between the teams involved
2. Goal difference in games between the teams involved
3. Goals scored in games between the teams involved
4. Away goals scored in games between the teams involved
5. Goal difference in all games
6. Goals scored in all games
7. Drawing of lots

Key to colour in group tables
The top finisher in each group will qualify for the Semi-finals

=== Group A ===
Pos	Team	Pld	W	D	L	GF	GA	GD	Pts	Qualification
1	(Tanzania) Azam	3	2	1	0	5	2	+3	7	Advanced to Semi-finals
2	(Tanzania) Singida Black Stars	3	1	2	0	5	3	+2	5	Advanced to Semi-finals
3	(Uganda) URA	3	1	1	1	3	3	0	4	
4	(Zanzibar) Mlandege	3	0	0	3	1	6	−5	0	

Source: Zanzibar Football Federation

=== Group B ===
Pos	Team	Pld	W	D	L	GF	GA	GD	Pts	Qualification
1	(Tanzania) Simba	2	2	0	0	3	1	+2	6	Advanced to Semi-finals
2	(Zanzibar) Fufuni FC	2	0	1	1	2	3	−1	1	
3	(Zanzibar) Muembe Makumbi City	2	0	1	1	1	2	−1	1	

Source: Zanzibar Football Federation

=== Group C ===
Pos	Team	Pld	W	D	L	GF	GA	GD	Pts	Qualification
1	(Tanzania) Young Africans	2	2	0	0	4	0	+4	6	Advanced to Semi-finals
2	(Tanzania) TRA United	2	0	1	1	1	2	−1	1	
3	(Zanzibar) KVZ	2	0	1	1	1	4	−3	1	

Source: Zanzibar Football Federation

=== Matches ===
The matches were played from 28 to 5 January 2026.

Team 1	Score	Team 2
Mlandege (Zanzibar)	1–3	(Tanzania) Singida Black Stars
Fufuni FC (Zanzibar)	1–1	(Zanzibar) Muembe Makumbi City
KVZ (Zanzibar)	1–1	(Tanzania) TRA United
Mlandege (Zanzibar)	0–1	(Uganda) URA
Singida Black Stars (Tanzania)	1–1	(Tanzania) Azam
Azam (Tanzania)	2–0	(Zanzibar) Mlandege
Singida Black Stars (Tanzania)	1–1	(Uganda) URA
Simba (Tanzania)	1–0	(Zanzibar) Muembe Makumbi City
Young Africans (Tanzania)	3–0	(Zanzibar) KVZ
Azam (Tanzania)	2–1	(Uganda) URA
Fufuni (Zanzibar)	1–2	(Tanzania) Simba
Young Africans (Tanzania)	1–0	(Tanzania) TRA United

== Semi-finals ==
Semi-finals
8 January 2026 – Amani Stadium
Azam	1
Simba	0
9 January 2026 – Amani Stadium
Singida Black Stars FC	0
Young Africans	1

Final
13 January 2026 – Gombani Stadium
Azam	0 (2)
Young Africans (P)	0 (4)

== Final ==
The final will be played on 13 January 2026 at Gombani Stadium

== Award ==
M/N	Player of the Match		Fair Play Player	
M/N	Player	Club	Player	Club
1	Marouf Tchakei	Singida Black Stars	Aimar Hafidh	Mlandege
3	Mboni Steven	Fufuni	Yakubu Said	Muembe Makumbi City
4	Abdulaziz Makame	TRA United	Michael Joseph	KVZ
5	George Masende	URA	Jamal Saleh	Mlandege
6	Himid Mao	Azam	Abdulmalik Zakaria	Singida Black Stars
7	Aishi Manula	Azam	Okorasma Manyemi	Mlandege
8	Morice Chukwu	Singida Black Star	Mulikyi Hudu	URA
9	Chamou Karaboue	Simba	Yakoub Said (2)	Muembe Makumbi City
10	Maxi Nzengeli	Young Africans	Majid Hussein	KVZ
2	Jephte Kitambala	Azam	Ott Ronald	URA
11	Naby Camara	Simba	Karim Ali	Fufuni
12	Duke Abuya	Young Africans	Nasry Kombo	TRA United
SF1	Lameck Lawi	Azam	Naby Camara	Simba
SF2	Maxi Nzengeli (2)	Young Africans	Abdulmalik Zakaria (2)	Singida Black Stars
