= Zanzibar Ocean View F.C. =

Football club

Zanzibar Ocean View Football Club is a football (soccer) club from Zanzibar based in Unguja. They were formed in 2010 as a breakaway side from Miembeni S.C.

== Achievements ==
- Zanzibar Premier League : 1

2010.

== Performance in CAF competitions ==
- CAF Champions League: 1 appearance

2011 – Preliminary Round

== Current Players ==
Note: Flags indicate national team as defined under FIFA eligibility rules; some limited exceptions apply. Players may hold more than one non-FIFA nationality.

No.	Pos.	Nation	Player
