= 2015–16 Zanzibar Premier League =

Zanzibar Premier League
- Season: 2015–16
- Champions: Zimamoto FC

The 2015–16 Zanzibar Premier League season is the top level of football competition in Zanzibar.

== Qualifying stage ==
The qualifying stage was divided into two leagues, one for teams in Unguja Island and one for teams in Pemba Island. In both leagues, the top four teams qualify for the championship playoff (8 Bora).

== Championship playoff ==
1.Zimamoto              14  10  3  1  40-11  33  [Unguja]  Champions
2.KVZ SC                13   8  4  1  25- 9  28  [Unguja]
3.JKU SC                13   7  4  2  30-10  25  [Unguja]
4.Mafunzo FC            14   7  2  5  29-18  23  [Unguja]
5.Chipukizi             13   5  1  7  20-24  16  [Pemba]
6.Jamhuri               13   4  4  5  14-18  16  [Pemba]
7.Mwenge SC             14   2  4  8  16-28  10  [Pemba]
8.African Kivumbi       14   0  0 14   9-65   0  [Pemba]
