= Stade de la Concorde =

Stadium in Bukavu, Democratic Republic of the Congo

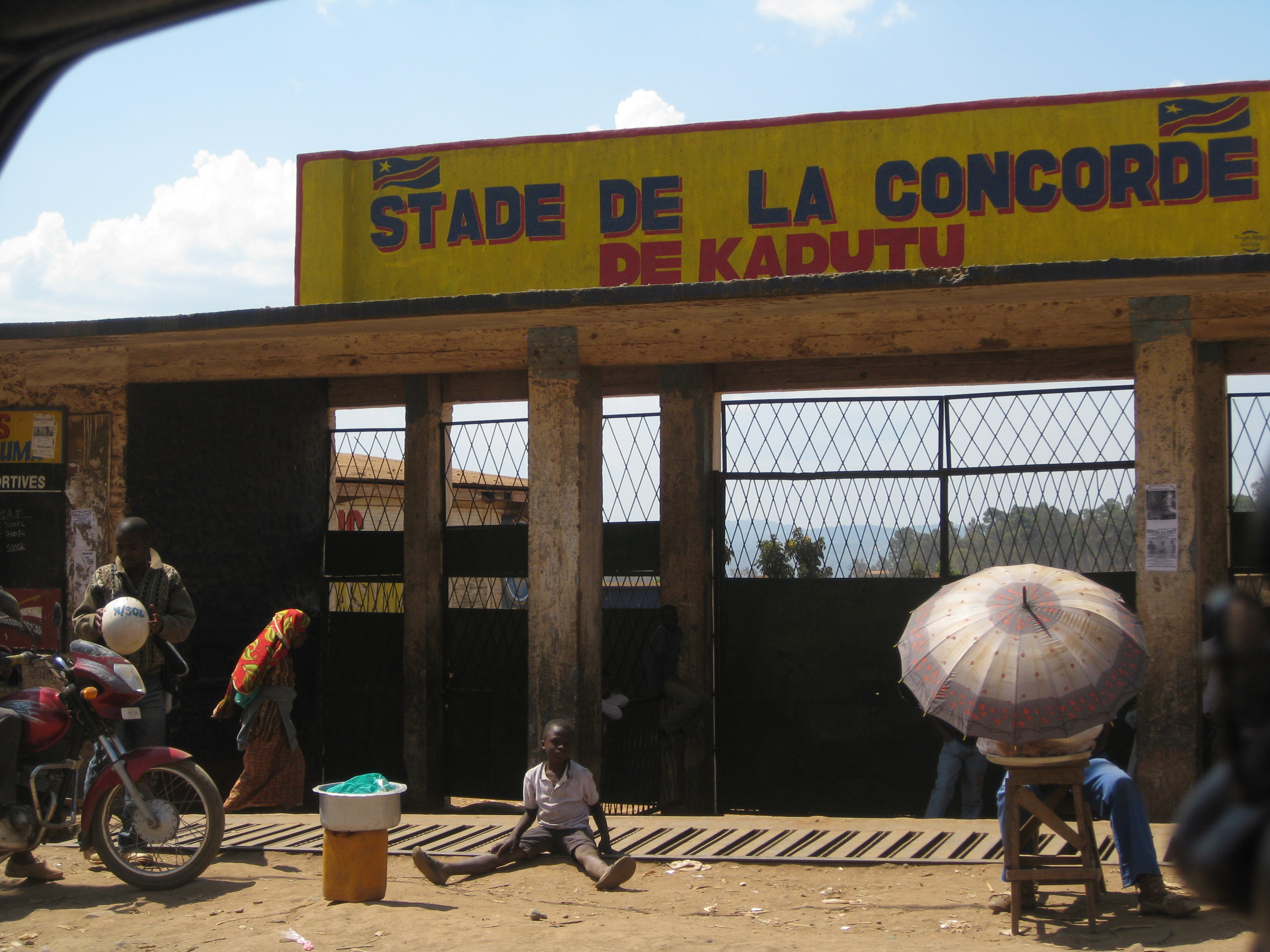
- Interactive map of Stade de la Concorde
- Location: (Democratic Republic of the Congo) Bukavu, Congo DR
- Coordinates: 2.5174°S 28.851°E
- Capacity: 10,000

Tenants
- OC Muungano; OC Bukavu Dawa

Stade de la Concorde is a stadium located in Bukavu, Democratic Republic of the Congo. It has a seating capacity of 10,000 spectators. It serves as the home of OC Muungano of the Linafoot.
