= 2007 CAF Confederation Cup =

International football competition in Africa

Confederation of African Football Confederation Cup

Tournament details
- Dates: 28 January – 24 November
- Teams: 58

Final positions
- Champions: (Tunisia) CS Sfaxien (1st title)
- Runners-up: (Sudan) Al-Merrikh

Tournament statistics
- Matches played: 114
- Goals scored: 309 (2.71 per match)
- Top scorer: (Democratic Republic of the Congo) Trésor Mputu (11 goals)

The 2007 CAF Confederation Cup was the fourth edition of the CAF Confederation Cup. Its schedule began with the preliminary round (home-and-away ties) in late January and mid-February with the second round in March and the third round in April.

== Qualifying rounds ==
All rounds have been drawn.

=== Preliminary round ===
1st legs played 26–28 January 2007 and 2nd legs played 9–11 February 2007.

Team 1	Agg.	Team 2	1st leg	2nd leg
Prince Louis (Burundi)	0–3	(Rwanda) ATRACO FC	0–0	0–3
Notwane (Botswana)	1–2	(Ethiopia) Defence F.C.	1–1	0–1
AS Togo-Port	1–3	(Tunisia) EGS Gafsa	1–1	0–2
Ports Authority F.C. (Sierra Leone)	3–0	(Mali) AS Bamako	2–0	1–0
ASAC Concorde (Mauritania)	1–3	(Algeria) ASO Chlef	0–1	1–2
Al Ahli Tripoli (Libya)	2–2 (a)	(Chad) AS CotonTchad	2–1	0–1
Telestars (Gabon)	1–2	(Democratic Republic of the Congo) OC Bukavu Dawa	1–0	0–2
Benfica de Bissau (Guinea-Bissau)	1–3	(Guinea) Satellite	1–3	^{1}
Curepipe Starlight (Mauritius)	1–4	(Madagascar) AJESAIA	1–0	0–4
St Michel United FC (Seychelles)	2–2 (a)	(Réunion) Saint-Pauloise FC	2–1	0–1
San Pedro Claver (Equatorial Guinea)	1–7	(Angola) Benfica de Luanda	1–5	0–2
JS Talangaï (Republic of the Congo)	0–3	(Cameroon) Les Astres FC	0–2	0–1
Sahel SC (Niger)	3–3 (a)	(Burkina Faso) Étoile Filante	2–2	1–1
Mundu (Zanzibar)	1–6	(Zimbabwe) Mwana Africa	0–3	1–3
Hawks (The Gambia)	1–1 (a)	(Ivory Coast) AS Denguélé	0–0	1–1
NPA Anchors (Liberia)	2–4	(Senegal) US Gorée	2–3	0–1
Têxtil do Punguè (Mozambique)	5–3	(Tanzania) Simba	1–1	4–2
AS Dragons (Benin)	0–3	(Nigeria) Kwara United	0–1	0–2

^{1} The tie was played over one leg by mutual consent due to civil unrest in Guinea.

=== First round ===
1st legs played 2–4 March 2007 and 2nd legs played 16–18 March 2007.

Team 1	Agg.	Team 2	1st leg	2nd leg
Defence F.C. (Ethiopia)	1–2	(Rwanda) ATRACO FC	1–0	0–2
Ports Authority F.C. (Sierra Leone)	4–6	(Tunisia) EGS Gafsa	3–2	1–4
ASO Chlef (Algeria)	1–0	(Egypt) ENPPI	0–0	1–0
AS CotonTchad (Chad)	2–5	(Sudan) Al-Merrikh	2–0	0–5
OC Bukavu Dawa (Democratic Republic of the Congo)	0–7	(Ivory Coast) Issia Wazi FC	0–2	0–5
Satellite (Guinea)	1–7	(Tunisia) CS Sfaxien	1–3	0–4
AJESAIA (Madagascar)	3–8	(Egypt) Ismaily SC	2–2	1–6
Saint-Pauloise FC (Réunion)	0–2	(Zambia) Green Buffaloes	0–0	0–2
Benfica de Luanda (Angola)	4–1	(Democratic Republic of the Congo) DC Motema Pembe	4–1	0–0
Les Astres FC (Cameroon)	awd^{1}	(Ghana) Tema Youth	—	—
Étoile Filante (Burkina Faso)	1–1 (4–3 p)	(Senegal) US Ouakam	1–0	0–1
Mwana Africa (Zimbabwe)	2–0	(Angola) Interclube	2–0	0–0
B.Hawks (The Gambia)	2–3	(Nigeria) Dolphins F.C.	0–0	2–3
US Gorée (Senegal)	2–3	(Morocco) Hassania Agadir	0–0	2–3
Têxtil do Punguè (Mozambique)	0–6	(Cameroon) US Douala	0–3	0–3
Kwara United (Nigeria)	3–3 (4–3 p)	(Algeria) MC Alger	3–0	0–3

^{1} Tema Youth were disqualified for not showing up to the first leg.

=== Second round ===
1st legs played 6–8 April 2007 and 2nd legs played 20–22 April 2007.

Team 1	Agg.	Team 2	1st leg	2nd leg
ATRACO FC (Rwanda)	3–3 (a)	(Tunisia) EGS Gafsa	2–2	1–1
ASO Chlef (Algeria)	1–3	(Sudan) Al-Merrikh	1–0	0–3
Issia Wazi FC (Ivory Coast)	1–2	(Tunisia) CS Sfaxien	1–0	0–2
Ismaily SC (Egypt)	3–2	(Zambia) Green Buffaloes	2–1	1–1
Benfica de Luanda (Angola)	4–1 ^{1}	(Cameroon) Les Astres FC	3–0	1–1
Étoile Filante (Burkina Faso)	2–3	(Zimbabwe) Mwana Africa	2–0	0–3
Dolphins FC (Nigeria)	1–1 (5–3 p)	(Morocco) Hassania Agadir	1–0	0–1
US Douala (Cameroon)	3–4	(Nigeria) Kwara United	1–1	2–3

^{1} Benfica de Luanda were ejected from the competition for fielding an ineligible player.

=== Play-off round ===
The 8 winners of the round of 16 play the losers of the round of 16 of the Champions League for 8 places in the group stage.
1st legs played 4–6 May 2007 and 2nd legs played 18–20 May 2007.

Team 1	Agg.	Team 2	1st leg	2nd leg
Étoile du Congo (Republic of the Congo)	2–3	(Cameroon) Les Astres FC	2–1	0–2
Wydad AC (Morocco)	0–3	(Egypt) Ismaily SC	0–1	0–2
TP Mazembe (Democratic Republic of the Congo)	4–1	(Zimbabwe) Mwana Africa	1–0	3–1
Young Africans (Tanzania)	0–2	(Sudan) Al-Merrikh	0–0	0–2
Nasarawa United (Nigeria)	1–2	(Nigeria) Kwara United	1–1	0–1
Mamelodi Sundowns (South Africa)	3–2	(Tunisia) EGS Gafsa	2–1	1–1
Coton Sport FC (Cameroon)	2–5	(Tunisia) CS Sfaxien	2–1	0–4
Maranatha (Togo)	1–4	(Nigeria) Dolphins	1–2	0–2

== Group stage ==
The Group Stage matches were played between August and October 2007.

=== Group A ===
Team	Pts	Pld	W	D	L	GF	GA	GD
(Tunisia) CS Sfaxien	13	6	4	1	1	13	4	+9
(Democratic Republic of the Congo) TP Mazembe	12	6	4	0	2	11	9	+2
(South Africa) Mamelodi Sundowns	6	6	2	0	4	7	13	-6
(Cameroon) Les Astres FC	4	6	1	1	4	5	10	-5

=== Group B ===
Team	Pts	Pld	W	D	L	GF	GA	GD
(Sudan) Al-Merrikh	10	6	3	1	2	13	8	+5
(Nigeria) Dolphins	10	6	3	1	2	8	7	+1
(Egypt) Ismaily SC	8	6	2	2	2	4	5	-1
(Nigeria) Kwara United	5	6	1	2	3	4	9	-5

== Knockout stage ==
=== Final ===
3 November 2007
--:-- UTC+2

Al-Merrikh (Sudan)	2–4	(Tunisia) CS Sfaxien
Paulinho 52'; Agab 77' (pen.)		Mbele 2', 18'; Kouassi 4', 60'

Al-Merrikh Stadium, Omdurman
24 November 2007
--:-- UTC+1

CS Sfaxien (Tunisia)	1–0	(Sudan) Al-Merrikh
Massaoud 87'

Stade Taïeb Mhiri, Sfax

CS Sfaxien won 5–2 on aggregate.

== Top goalscorers ==
The top scorers from the 2007 CAF Confederation Cup are as follows:

Rank	Name	Team	Goals
1	(Democratic Republic of the Congo) Trésor Mputu	(Democratic Republic of the Congo) TP Mazembe	11
2	(Ivory Coast) Blaise Kouassi	(Tunisia) CS Sfaxien	10
3	(Ivory Coast) Wilfried Bony	(Ivory Coast) Issia Wazi	6
3	(Nigeria) Endurance Idahor	(Sudan) Al-Merrikh	6
3	(Sudan) Faisal Agab	(Sudan) Al-Merrikh	6
3	(Democratic Republic of the Congo) Lelo Mbele	(Tunisia) CS Sfaxien	6
7	(Egypt) Omar Gamal	(Egypt) Ismaily	4
7	(Nigeria) Bola Bello	(Nigeria) Dolphins	4
7	(Ivory Coast) Douaou Bakari	(Tunisia) EGS Gafsa	4
