= 2018–19 Zanzibar Premier League =

Zanzibar Premier League
- Season: 2018–19

The 2018–19 Zanzibar Premier League is the 37th season of the Zanzibar Premier League, the top-tier football league in Zanzibar. The season started on 20 October 2018.

== Standings ==
Reported table (25 April 2019).

 1.KMKM SC               35  23  8  4  84-25  77       [Unguja] NB: KMKM champions
 2.KVZ SC                35  22  8  5  55-26  74       [Unguja]
 3.Zimamoto SC           35  22  7  6  74-27  73       [Unguja]
 4.JKU SC                35  21 10  4  65-26  73       [Unguja]
 5.Malindi SC            35  21  9  5  57-30  72       [Unguja]
 6.Mafunzo SC            35  19 13  3  61-23  70       [Unguja]
 7.Mlandege FC           35  21  7  7  55-23  70       [Unguja]
 8.Jang'ombe Boys FC     35  15  8 12  47-33  53       [Unguja]
 9.Polisi SC             34  11 13 10  45-33  46       [Unguja]
10.Chuoni FT             35  14  4 17  53-56  46       [Unguja]
11.Chipukizi             35  10 10 15  38-56  40       [Pemba]
12.Selem View            35   7 17 11  30-45  38       [Pemba]
13.Jamhuri               35   9 10 16  29-41  37       [Pemba]
------------------------------------------------
14.Mwenge (Wete)         34   7 12 15  38-46  33       [Pemba] 
15.New Star              35   8  9 18  42-71  33       [Pemba]
16.Opec                  35   6  8 21  33-92  26       [Pemba]
17.Mbuyuni               35   6  4 25  37-87  22  [P]  [Pemba]
18. Hard Rock             35   3 10 22  31-66  19       [Pemba]
19.Kizimbani             36   2  5 29  26-93  11       [Pemba]
 -.Shaba                 apparently excluded           [Pemba]
