= Jang'ombe Boys F.C. =

Zanzibari Football Club

Jang'ombe Boys F.C. is a Zanzibari football club based in Jang'ombe. It competes in the Zanzibar Premier League.

== 2017 Mapinduzi Cup ==
Competing in the Zanzibar Premier League, the highest echelon of Zanzibar football in 2017, Jang'ombe Boys also entered the 2017 Mapinduzi Cup, where they beat Ugandan outfit URA 2–1 in their opening game. However, after facing Tanzanian side Simba in their final group stage clash they were knocked out from the tournament.
