= 2016–17 Zanzibar Premier League =

Zanzibar Premier League
- Season: 2016–17
- Champions: JKU SC

The 2016–17 Zanzibar Premier League season is the top level of football competition in Zanzibar.

== Qualifying stage ==
The qualifying stage was divided into two leagues, one for teams in Unguja Island and one for teams in Pemba Island. In both leagues, the top four teams qualify for the championship playoff (8 Bora).

=== Kanda ya Unguja ===
Reported Final Table (Apr 26):

 1.JKU SC                34  23  6  5  55-18  75  Qualified
 2.Jang'ombe Boys FC     34  18 12  4  44-25  66  Qualified
 3.Zimamoto SC           34  17 10  7  56-30  61  Qualified
 4.Taifa ya Jang'ombe    34  17 10  7  47-23  61  Qualified
 - - - - - - - - - - - - - - - - - - - - - - - -
 5.Polisi SC             34  16 12  6  40-16  60
 6.KMKM SC               34  16  9  9  51-23  57
 7.Mafunzo SC            34  17  5 12  54-25  56
 8.KVZ SC                34  14 11  9  48-26  53
 9.Black Sailors FC      34  13 12  9  45-29  48  [51?]
10.Chuoni FT             34  11 14  9  38-27  47
11.Kilimani City FC      34  14  5 15  41-47  47  [*]
12.Kipanga SC            34  12  6 16  39-35  42
------------------------------------------------
13.Malindi SC            34  12  6 16  27-34  42  Relegated
14.Kijichi FC            34   8 12 14  26-32  36  Relegated
15.Mundu FC              34  10  4 20  32-68  34  Relegated
16.Miembeni SC           34   7  6 21  19-55  27  Relegated
17.Chwaka Stars FC       34   6  6 22  24-59  24  Relegated
18.Kimbunga FC           34   1  2 31  22-132  5  Relegated

[*] Mtende Rangers were renamed Kilimani City

NB: total goal difference +4

=== Kanda ya Pemba ===
Table (Mar 30):

 1.Jamhuri               29  17  8  4  43-19  59
 2.Okapi (Msuka)         29  16  8  5  37-18  56
 3.Mwenge (Wete)         29  16  7  6  36-22  55
 4.Kizimbani             29  15  9  5  36-17  54
 - - - - - - - - - - - - - - - - - - - - - - - -
 5.Chipukizi             29  13 12  4  39-24  51
 6.Dogo Moro             29  11 12  6  37-28  45
 7.New Star              29  12  8  9  32-27  44
 8.Shaba                 29   9 13  7  32-29  40
 9.Fufuni SC             29  10  8 11  30-31  38
10.Maji Maji             29  10  7 12  37-31  37
11.Al Jazira             29  10  6 13  36-36  36
12.Young Islanders       29   9  7 13  24-33  34
13. Wawi Star             29   7 11 11  25-29  32
14.Sharp Victor          29   8  8 13  29-41  32
15.Danger Boys           29   5 13 11  27-32  28
16. Hard Rock             29   4 13 12  20-38  25
17.African Kivumbi       29   6  5 18  29-58  23
18.Madungu               29   1  9 19  14-51  12

Top of Table (Apr 26):

1.Jamhuri                                             Qualified
2.Mwenge (Wete)                                       Qualified
3.Kizimbani                                           Qualified
4.Okapi (Msuka)                                       Qualified

== Championship playoff ==
1.JKU SC                14  10  3  1  26- 9  33  [Unguja]   Champions
2.Zimamoto SC           14   8  4  2  31-10  28  [Unguja]
3.Jang'ombe Boys FC     14   8  3  3  20- 8  27  [Unguja]
4.Jamhuri               14   7  3  4  27-18  24  [Pemba]
5.Kizimbani             14   5  1  8  15-38  16  [Pemba]
6.Taifa ya Jang'ombe    14   3  3  8  15-24  12  [Unguja]
7.Okapi (Msuka)         14   2  4  8  15-32  10  [Pemba]
8.Mwenge (Wete)         14   2  1 11  21-31   7  [Pemba]
