= 2005 CAF Confederation Cup =

International football competition in Africa

Confederation of African Football Confederation Cup

Tournament details
- Dates: 30 January – 19 November
- Teams: 58

Final positions
- Champions: (Morocco) FAR Rabat (1st title)
- Runners-up: (Nigeria) Dolphins FC

Tournament statistics
- Matches played: 98
- Goals scored: 266 (2.71 per match)
- Top scorer(s): (Ghana) Eric Gawu (Morocco) Khalid El Hirech (Nigeria) Kelechi Osunwa (7 goals each)

The 2005 CAF Confederation Cup was the 2nd edition of the CAF Confederation Cup. It started with the preliminary round (home-and away ties) that was played in January and February 2005, as FAR Rabat of Morocco beat Dolphins F.C. of Nigeria in the final.

== Qualifying rounds ==
=== Preliminary round ===
1st legs played on 30 January 2005 and 2nd legs played on 13 February 2005.

Team 1	Agg.	Team 2	1st leg	2nd leg
Mogas 90 (Benin)	2–3	(Togo) AS Douanes	1–3	1–0
Dakar UC (Senegal)	1–1 (1–3 p)	(Morocco) CODM Meknes	1–0	0–1
Armed Forces Football Club (The Gambia)	w/o	(Guinea) CI Kamsar	—	—
AS Nianan Koulikoro (Mali)	1–2	(Morocco) Olympique Khouribga	1–1	0–1
Heart of Lions (Ghana)	w/o	(Mauritania) ASAC Concorde	—	—
Sony Elá Nguema (Equatorial Guinea)	1–1	(Republic of the Congo) Munisport de Pointe-Noire	0–0	1–1
SC Cilu (Democratic Republic of the Congo)	8–0	(Ivory Coast) CO Bouaflé	3–0	5–0
ASFB Bobo (Burkina Faso)	3–4	(Libya) Al-Ittihad	3–0	0–4
Gazelle FC (Chad)	3–3 (a)	(Gabon) FC 105 Libreville	3–1	0–2
Botswana Defence Force XI	4–2	(Angola) Sonangol do Namibe	3–1	1–1
Savanne SC (Mauritius)	2–4	(Seychelles) Red Star	2–0	0–4
Kipanga (Zanzibar)	1–2	(Uganda) Kampala City Council	1–1	0–1
Green Buffaloes FC (Zambia)	2–3	(Rwanda) APR FC	1–0	1–3
Ferroviário de Maputo (Mozambique)	w/o	(Zimbabwe) Hwange Colliery F.C.	—	—
USCA Foot (Madagascar)	4–2	(Tanzania) Prisons FC	4–1	0–1
Banks SC (Ethiopia)	w/o	(Kenya) Chemelil Sugar	—	—
King Faisal Babes (Ghana)	bye			

Notes

1. Armed Forces were withdrawn by the Gambian FA.
2. Although the club had been sent by the deadline, ZIFA said Hwange Colliery were only allowed to take part if they won the Unity Cup final. When they lost and declined entering, ZIFA offered their position to Motor Action FC, but this was blocked by CAF.
3. King Faisal Babes were scheduled to play with the Sierra Leonean team, who were disqualified after their FA failed to enter a team by the deadline.

=== First round ===
1st legs played on 5 March 2005 and 2nd legs played on 19 March 2005.

Team 1	Agg.	Team 2	1st leg	2nd leg
AS Douanes (Togo)	1–3	(Ivory Coast) Stella Club d'Adjamé	1–0	0–3
CODM Meknès (Morocco)	0–3	(Tunisia) AS Marsa	0–1	0–2
CI Kamsar (Guinea)	2–4	(Nigeria) Bendel Insurance	1–1	1–3
King Faisal Babes (Ghana)	4–1	(Senegal) ASEC Ndiambour	3–0	1–1
Olympique Khouribga (Morocco)	2–4	(Algeria) MC Oran	2–0	0–4
ASAC Concorde (Mauritania)	0–2	(Cameroon) Bamboutos FC	0–0	0–2
Sony Elá Nguema (Equatorial Guinea)	1–4	(Nigeria) Enugu Rangers	0–1	1–3
SC Cilu (Democratic Republic of the Congo)	2–2 (a)	(Cameroon) US Douala	2–1	0–1
Al-Ittihad (Libya)	5–3	(Tunisia) JS Kairouan	3–0	2–3
FC 105 Libreville (Gabon)	6–2	(Angola) Interclube	3–1	3–1
Botswana Defence Force XI	1–2	(Democratic Republic of the Congo) FC Saint Eloi Lupopo	1–0	0–2
Red Star (Seychelles)	1–13	(South Africa) Supersport United	1–4	0–9
Kampala City Council (Uganda)	0–1	(Rwanda) APR FC	0–0	0–1
Clube Ferroviário de Maputo (Mozambique)	0–3	(Egypt) Ismaily	0–1	0–2
USCA Foot (Madagascar)	3–4	(Sudan) Al-Merreikh	3–1	0–3
Banks SC (Ethiopia)	1–3	(Egypt) Al-Mokawloon Al-Arab	0–0	1–3

=== Second round ===
1st legs played on 8–11 April 2005 and 2nd legs played on 23-24 April 2005.

Team 1	Agg.	Team 2	1st leg	2nd leg
Stella Club d'Adjamé (Ivory Coast)	1–2	(Tunisia) AS Marsa	1–0	0–2
Bendel Insurance (Nigeria)	0–1	(Ghana) King Faisal Babes	0–0	0–1
MC Oran (Algeria)	2–2 (a)	(Cameroon) Bamboutos FC	2–1	0–1
Enugu Rangers (Nigeria)	3–2	(Cameroon) US Douala	3–1	0–1
Al-Ittihad (Libya)	3–3 (a)	(Gabon) FC 105 Libreville	3–1	0–2
FC Saint Eloi Lupopo (Democratic Republic of the Congo)	2–2 (2–3 p)	(South Africa) SuperSport United	2–0	0–2
APR FC (Rwanda)	w/o	(Egypt) Ismaily	—	—
Al-Merreikh (Sudan)	3–4	(Egypt) Al-Mokawloon Al-Arab	3–1	0–3

Notes

1. APR FC requested a postponement for the 1st leg due to genocide commemorations, but they failed to inform CAF. Ismaily travelled to Nairobi, and Rwandan immigration officials refused their team entry into the country. APR were found guilty of improper conduct, ejected from the competition and fined $5000.

=== Play-off round ===
In this round, the 8 winners of the round of 16 play the losers of the round of 16 of the Champions League for 8 places in the group stage.
1st legs played on May 6–8, 2005 and 2nd legs played on May 21–23, 2005.

Team 1	Agg.	Team 2	1st leg	2nd leg
USM Alger (Algeria)	2–2 (4–5 p)	(Tunisia) AS Marsa	1–1	1–1
Africa Sports National (Ivory Coast)	0–3	(Egypt) Al-Mokawloon Al-Arab	0–0	0–3
Kaizer Chiefs (South Africa)	w/o	(Egypt) Ismaily	—	—
ASA (Angola)	2–3	(Gabon) FC 105 Libreville	1–1	1–2
FAR Rabat (Morocco)	2–2 (a)	(Nigeria) Enugu Rangers	1–0	1–2
Dolphins F.C. (Nigeria)	6–3	(South Africa) SuperSport United	4–1	2–2
Red Arrows (Zambia)	3–4	(Ghana) King Faisal Babes	1–1	2–3
Fello Star (Guinea)	4–0	(Cameroon) Bamboutos FC	1–0	3–0

Notes

1. Kaizer Chiefs withdrew; they were banned for three years from CAF tournaments and fined 1500$.

== Group stage ==
Key to colours in group tables
Group winners advance to the final

=== Group A ===
Team	Pts	Pld	W	D	L	GF	GA	GD	
(Morocco) FAR Rabat	16	6	5	1	0	7	2	+5	Final
(Ghana) King Faisal Babes	12	6	4	0	2	9	5	+4	
(Tunisia) AS Marsa	7	6	2	1	3	6	6	0	
(Guinea) Fello Star	0	6	0	0	6	2	11	-9	

=== Group B ===
Team	Pts	Pld	W	D	L	GF	GA	GD	
(Nigeria) Dolphins FC	14	6	4	2	0	10	4	+6	Final
(Egypt) Ismaily	11	6	3	2	1	11	4	+7	
(Egypt) Al-Mokawloon Al-Arab	6	6	2	0	4	6	8	-2	
(Gabon) FC 105 Libreville	3	6	1	0	5	4	15	-11	

== Knockout stage ==
=== Final ===
The 1st leg was played on November 6 and the 2nd leg on November 19.

Caf comeption nga
6 November 2005
--:-- UTC+0

Dolphins FC (Nigeria)	1–0	(Morocco) FAR Rabat
Bello 85'

Liberation Stadium, Port Harcourt
Attendance: 12,000
Referee: Malick Sillah (Gambia)
19 November 2005
--:-- UTC+1

FAR Rabat (Morocco)	3–0	(Nigeria) Dolphins FC
Serraj 10', 45'; Ajraoui 63'

Moulay Abdellah Stadium, Rabat
Attendance: 40,000
Referee: Hichem Guirat (Tunisia)

== Top goal scorers ==
The top scorers from the 2005 CAF Confederation Cup are as follows. Eric Gawu/Khalid El Hirech/Kelechi Osunwa

Rank	Name	Team	Goals
1	(Ghana) Eric Gawu	(Ghana) King Faisal Babes	7
1	(Morocco) Khalid El Hirech	(Tunisia) AS Marsa	7
1	(Nigeria) Kelechi Osunwa	(Nigeria) Dolphins FC	7
4	(Egypt) Alaa Abdel Ghany	(Egypt) Al-Mokawloon Al-Arab	5
4	(South Africa) Abram Raselemane	(South Africa) Supersport United	5
