= Eric Gawu =

Ghanaian footballer

Personal information
- Full name: Eric Sunday Gawu
- Date of birth: November 10, 1982 (age 43)
- Place of birth: Ghana
- Height: 1.85 m (6 ft 1 in)
- Position: Striker

Team information
- Current team: Dreams

Senior career*
Years	Team	Apps	(Gls)
2004–2006	King Faisal Babes	57	(21)
2006–2007	Hearts of Oak	29	(12)
2006–2007	Al Sadd	19	(7)
2008–2010	Hearts of Oak	61	(31)
2010–2011	Hapoel Ashkelon	31	(17)
2011–2012	Bnei Sakhnin	26	(11)
2012–2015	Medeama SC		
2015–	Dreams	61	(4)

International career
2004–2011	Ghana	35	(12)
- * Club domestic league appearances and goals as of 18 February 2020

Eric Gawu (born November 10, 1987) is a Ghanaian football player who, is playing for Dreams.

== Career ==
Had a very good season at King Faisal Babes in the 2004-2005 Ghana league season but could not settle when he made a switch to Hearts of Oak for $160,000. Eric Gawu has gone through torrid periods finding his rhythm, compelling fans of Hearts of Oak to question whether the management of the club made a wise buy. In 2007 FK Sarajevo considered a move for him from Hearts of Oak, the Bosnia & Herzegovina club wanted him on a years contract. On 3 February 2006, he was transferred to Al Sadd of the Qatar Stars League and turned back after one year to his former club Hearts of Oak.

== International ==
Member of Ghana's 2003-2004 Olympic team, he has played the Ghana National Team on a few occasion.

== Honours ==
Hearts of Oak

- Ghana Premier League: 2006–07, 2008–09

Medeama

- Ghanaian FA Cup: 2012–13
