= Jamhuri F.C. =

Jamhuri SC
- Full name: Jamhuri Sports Club
- Founded: 1953
- Ground: Chasasa; Zanzibar
- Capacity: 20,000
- League: Zanzibar Premier League
- 2016–2017: 1st in ZFA premier league Pemba division.

Jamhuri Sports Club, is a football club based in Pemba Island, Zanzibar.

== History ==
Jamhuri was established in 1953, and at the time was called Barghash Sports Club. After the Zanizibar revolution in 1964, the name was changed to Jamhuri.

The main rival team is Mwenge S.C. as both team are located in Wete. Jamhuri was the first team from Pemba Island to be crowned champions of the Zanzibar Premier League.

== Achievements ==
- Zanzibar Premier League : 1

2003

- Mapinduzi Cup : 1

1998

== Performance in CAF competitions ==
- CAF Confederation Cup: 1 appearance

2012 –
