= San Pedro Claver =

Equatoguinean football club

San Pedro
- Full name: San Pedro Claver
- Ground: Equatorial Guinea

San Pedro Claver, commonly known as San Pedro, is an Equatorial Guinean football club based in Ebibeyin.

The club is likely best known for their 2007 appearance in the CAF Confederation Cup, in which they lost to Benfica Luanda of Angola 7–1 on aggregate in the preliminary round.

San Pedro Claver withdrew from the 2008 championship and no record exists of their being active since.

== Performance in CAF competitions ==
- CAF Confederation Cup: 1 appearance

2007 CAF Confederation Cup
