= AS Nyuki =

- Full name: Association Sportive Nyuki
- Founded: 1977; 48 years ago
- Ground: Stade de l'Unité, Goma, DR Congo
- Capacity: 10,000
- Chairman: Julien Paluku
- Manager: Arerimana Aruna
- League: Linafoot
- 2018–19: 8th

Association Sportive Nyuki is a Congolese football club based in Butembo, North Kivu province.

The club was founded in 1977 and plays in the Linafoot, the top level of professional football in DR Congo.

In 2018, AS Nyuki, won the Coupe du Congo (DR Congo) for the first time in the club's history.

== Honours ==
Coupe du Congo

- Winners (1): 2018

== Performance in CAF competitions ==
- CAF Confederation Cup: 1 appearances

2018–19 – First Round
