= Kipanga F.C. =

Kipanga
- Full name: Kipanga Football Club
- Ground: Kipanga Stadium; Zanzibar
- Capacity: ?
- Chairman: ?
- Manager: ?
- League: Zanzibar Second Division

Kipanga Football Club, or simply Kipanga is a football club from Africa based in Zanzibar.

The team won the Zanzibar Premier League in 2000.

== Achievements ==
- Zanzibar Premier League : 1

2000

- Zanzibari Cup : 1

2022

== Performance in CAF competitions ==
- CAF Confederation Cup: 2 appearances

2005 – Preliminary Round
2023 – Sedcond Round

== Current Players ==
Note: Flags indicate national team as defined under FIFA eligibility rules; some limited exceptions apply. Players may hold more than one non-FIFA nationality.

No.	Pos.	Nation	Player

== Stadium ==
Currently the team plays at the Kipanga Stadium.
