= Amaan Stadium =

Sports venue in Zanzibar, Tanzania

- Uwanja wa Amaan (Swahili)

- Location in Tanzania
- Location: Unguja, Zanzibar City
- Coordinates: 6.166003°S 39.223862°E
- Operator: Zanzibar Football Association
- Capacity: 15,000
- Type: Stadium
- Surface: GrassMaster

Construction
- Built: 1970

Tenants
- KMKM FC; Miembeni S.C. Mlandege FC; Zanzibar national football team

Amaan Stadium (also spelled Amani) is a stadium in Zanzibar, Tanzania. The stadium holds 15,000 people. It is intended to be used during the 2027 Africa Cup of Nations soccer tournament.

== History ==
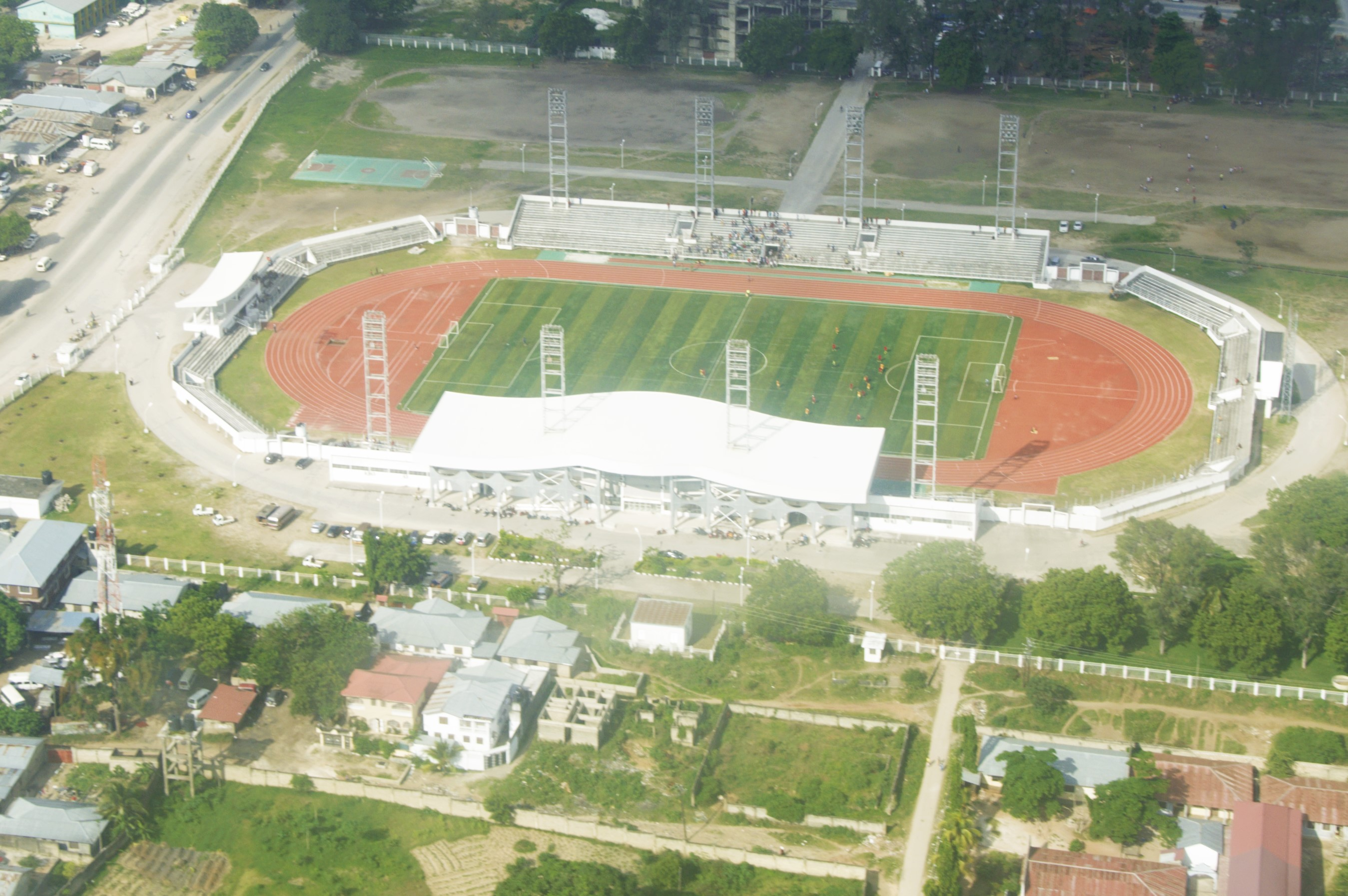
A bird's view of Amaan Stadium in Zanzibar.

The stadium was built with Chinese government aid and opened in 1970. This was China's first stadium project in Africa and it marked the beginning of its stadium diplomacy over the decades.

The stadium was the location of a ceremony on 5 February 1977, uniting the Afro-Shirazi Party and the Tanganyika African National Union into the Chama cha Mapinduzi. The flags of the respective parties were raised and lowered for the last time with the flag of the Chama cha Mapinduzi then being raised. Amani Abeid Karume was sworn in as president of Zanzibar on 8 November 2000.

The stadium underwent refurbishment again with Chinese assistance, reopening in 2010.

The annual Revolution Day anniversary celebration at the national level is held at the stadium on 12 January.

== See also ==
- Stadium diplomacy
