= Mundu S.C. =

Mundu SC
- Full name: Mundu Sport Club
- Ground: Unguja Park; Unguja, Zanzibar (Tanzania)
- Capacity: 5,000
- League: Zanzibar Premier League

Mundu SC is a Zanzibar football club based in Nungwi near Unguja in East Africa. The club is one of the three biggest football clubs in Unguja.

Currently the team competes in the Zanzibar Premier League.

The club competed in the CAF Confederation Cup for the first time in 2007.

== Stadium ==
Currently the team plays at the 5000 capacity Unguja Park.

== Performance in CAF competitions ==
- CAF Confederation Cup: 2 appearances

2007, 2009
