= OC Bukavu Dawa =

Professional football club in Congo

- Full name: Olympic Club Bukavu Dawa
- Founded: 1951 as Bushi FC
- Ground: Stade de la Concorde, Bukavu
- Capacity: 10,000
- League: Ligue 2
- 2024–25: 12th in Linafoot (relegated)
Home colours	Away colours

Olympic Club Bukavu Dawa is a football club in Bukavu, Democratic Republic of Congo and currently playing in the Linafoot, the top level of professional football in DR Congo and they play at 10,000 capacity Stade de la Concorde.

== History ==
Founded in 1951 Bukavu Dawa won the Coupe du Congo one time in 2008 editions. and competed in the CAF Confederation Cup in 2007 and 2009.

== Honours ==
Coupe du Congo

- Winners (1): 2008

Linafoot Ligue 2

- Winners (1): 2018–19

== Performance in CAF competitions ==
- CAF Confederation Cup: 2 appearances

2007 – First Round
2009 – Preliminary Round
