= Tanzania FA Cup =

- Founded: 1974
- Qualifier for: CAF Confederation Cup; Tanzania Community Shield
- Current champions: Simba
- Most championships: Young Africans SC (7 times)
- Website: www.habari.go.tz
- 2026–27 Tanzania FA Cup

The Tanzania FA Cup (also called the CRDB BANK Federation Cup) is the top knockout tournament of the Tanzanian football.

Previously, the Nyerere Cup was the top knockout tournament. It was created in 1974 and was contested by teams from both Tanzania mainland and the Isles of Zanzibar.

Tanzania Stars won the cup twice as a fourth/third tier club.

== Winners ==
Nyerere Cup

- 1974 : JKU FC (Zanzibar)
- 1975 : Young Africans FC (Dar es Salaam)
- 1976 : Rangers International (Dar es Salaam)
- 1977 : KMKM (Zanzibar)
- 1978 : Pan African FC (Dar es Salaam)
- 1979 : Pan African FC (Dar es Salaam)
- 1980 : Coastal Union (Tanga)
- 1981 : Pan African FC (Datr-es-Salaam)
- 1982 : KMKM (Zanzibar)
- 1983 : KMKM (Zanzibar)
- 1984 : Simba SC (Dar es Salaam)
- 1985 : Miembeni SC (Zanzibar)
- 1986 : Miembeni SC (Zanzibar)
- 1987 : Miembeni SC (Zanzibar)
- 1988 : Coastal Union (Tanga)
- 1989 : Pamba FC (Mwanza)
- 1990 : Small Simba SC (Zanzibar)
- 1991 : Railways SC (Morogoro)
- 1992 : Pamba FC (Mwanza)
- 1993 : Malindi FC (Zanzibar)
- 1994 : Young Africans FC (Dar es Salaam)
- 1995 : Simba SC (Dar es Salaam)
- 1996 : Sigara SC (Dar es Salaam)
- 1997 : Tanzania Stars (Dar es Salaam)
- 1998 : Tanzania Stars (Dar es Salaam) 2–1 Prisons SC (Mbeya)
- 1999 : Young Africans FC (Dar es Salaam)
- 2000 : Simba SC (Dar es Salaam)
- 2001 : Polisi (Zanzibar) 2–0 Young Africans FC (Dar es Salaam)
- 2002 : JKT Ruvu Stars (Coast Region) 1–0 KMKM (Zanzibar)

Tanzania FA Cup

- 2015–16: Young Africans FC (Dar es Salaam) 3–1 Azam F.C.
- 2016–17: Simba SC (Dar es Salaam) 2–1 (aet) Mbao FC
- 2017–18: Mtibwa Sugar F.C. 3–2 Singida United F.C.
- 2018–19: Azam F.C.
- 2019–20: Simba
- 2020–21: Simba
- 2021–22: Young Africans FC (Dar es Salaam) 3–3 (aet, 4–1 pen.) Coastal Union F.C. (Tanga)
- 2022–23: Young Africans FC (Dar es Salaam) 1–0 Azam F.C. (Dar es Salaam)
- 2023–24: Young Africans FC (Dar es Salaam) 0–0 (aet, 6–5 pen.) Azam F.C. (Dar es Salaam)
- 2024–25: Young Africans (Dar es Salaam) 2–0 Singida Black stars (Singida)
- 2025–26: Simba 1–0 Azam
