= KMKM F.C. =

KMKM SC
- Full name: Kikosi Maalum cha Kuzuia Magendo Sports Club
- Founded: 1965; 60 years ago
- Ground: Unguja Park; Unguja, Zanzibar
- Capacity: 5,000
- Manager: Massoud Irambona
- League: Zanzibar Premier League
- 2023–24: 3rd

Kikosi Maalum cha Kuzuia Magendo Sports Club, or simply KMKM SC is a football club from Zanzibar based in Unguja.

== Current squad ==
=== First-team squad ===
As of 31 May 2024

Note: Flags indicate national team as defined under FIFA eligibility rules; some limited exceptions apply. Players may hold more than one non-FIFA nationality.

No.	Pos.	Nation	Player
1	GK	ZAN	Nassor Abdullah Nassor
2	DF	ZAN	Hafidh Mohammed Ali
3	DF	ZAN	Abasi Kapombe
4	DF	ZAN	Ahmed Haji
5	MF	ZAN	Ali Badru
6	DF	ZAN	Kheir Makame Jecha
7	MF	TAN	Adam Abdullah
8	MF	ZAN	Mudrick Abdulla
9	MF	ZAN	Ilyasa Mohamed
10	FW	ZAN	Imran Abdalla
11	MF	ZAN	Iddi Juma
12	DF	ZAN	Ishaka Mwinyi
13	MF	ZAN	Sudi Karungo
14	MF	ZAN	Salum Salum
15	MF	COD	Mukanisa Pembele

No.	Pos.	Nation	Player
16	DF	TAN	Mwinyi Mngwali
17	DF	TAN	Hassan Mbwana Hassan
18	FW	ZAN	Abrahman Ali
19	DF	ZAN	Firdas Amour
21	MF	ZAN	Jamal Ally
22	MF	ZAN	Nassir Abdalla
23	DF	ZAN	Abubakar Omar
24	GK	ZAN	Suleiman Zakaria
25	MF	ZAN	Mzee Mzee
28	DF	ZAN	Kassim Hassan
29	GK	ZAN	Mudathir Mohammed
36	MF	ZAN	Samir Yahya Said
39	FW	ZAN	Ezra Jinsinza
40	GK	ZAN	Vuai Makame Jecha
43	FW	ZAN	Sulum Akida Shukuru

== Achievements ==
- Tanzanian Premier League : 1

1984.

- Zanzibar Premier League : 8

1984, 1986, 2004, 2013, 2014, 2019, 2021, 2022.

- Nyerere Cup : 3

1977, 1982, 1983.

- Zanzibari Cup : 1

2002.

== Performance in CAF competitions ==
- CAF Champions League: 5 appearances

2005 – preliminary round
2014 – preliminary round
2015 – preliminary round
2020 – preliminary round
2022 – first round

- CAF Confederation Cup: 1 appearance

2011 – preliminary round
