= Chipukizi F.C. =

Football club in Zanzibar

- Full name: Chipukizi Football Club
- League: Zanzibar Premier League

Chipukizi F.C., or simply Chipukizi, is an association football club based in Zanzibar.

The team currently plays in the Zanzibar Premier League.
