= Mafunzo F.C. =

Mafunzo FC
- Full name: Mafunzo Football Club
- Founded: 1970s
- Ground: Amaan Stadium, Zanzibar
- Capacity: 15,000
- Manager: Shaaban Ramadhani
- League: Zanzibar Premier League
- 2021–22: 3rd

Mafunzo Football Club is a Tanzanian / Zanzibarian football club.

The team competes in the Zanzibar Premier League.

They competed in the CAF Champions League for the first time in 2010.

== Achievements ==
- Zanzibar Premier League: 3

2009, 2011, 2015

- Zanzibar FA Cup: 2

2005, 2019

== Performance in CAF competitions ==
- CAF Champions League: 2 appearances

2010 – Preliminary Round
2012 – Preliminary Round
2016 – Preliminary Round
