= Mlandege FC =

- Full name: Mlandege Football Club
- Nickname: Team Mulla
- Short name: MFC
- Founded: 1970; 56 years ago
- Ground: Amaan Stadium
- Capacity: 15,000
- Chairman: Kamal Abdulsatar
- League: Zanzibar Premier League
- 2020: 1st (Champions)
- Website: https://www.facebook.com/people/Mlandege-Fc/100057029187048/

Mlandege FC is an association football club from Unguja that competes in the Zanzibar Premier League. With seven league titles, it is the joint most successful club in league history along with KMKM. The club was founded in 1970.

== Achievements ==
- Zanzibar Premier League : 7

1996, 1997, 1998, 1998, 2001, 2002, 2020.

- Mapinduzi Cup : 2

2023, 2024

== International competitions ==
The following is a list of results for Mlandege FC in international competitions. Mlandege FC’s scores are listed first.

Year	Tournament	Round	Opponent	Home	Away	Agg.	Ref.
1997	CECAFA Club Championship	Group Stage	(Kenya) Leopards	1–3			
1997	CECAFA Club Championship	Group Stage	(Uganda) Express	1–2			
2002	CECAFA Club Championship	Group Stage	(Uganda) Villa	1–1			
2002	CECAFA Club Championship	Group Stage	(Rwanda) APR	1–0			
2002	CECAFA Club Championship	Group Stage	(Kenya) Oserian	0–0			
2002	CECAFA Club Championship	Group Stage	(Ethiopia) Mebrat Hail	1–1			
2003	CECAFA Club Championship	Group Stage	(Eritrea) Red Sea	1–3			
2003	CECAFA Club Championship	Group Stage	(Tanzania) Young Africans	1–2			
2003	CECAFA Club Championship	Group Stage	(Sudan) Al Khartoum	1–1			
2003	CECAFA Club Championship	Group Stage	(Uganda) Villa	0–1			
2020–21	CAF Champions League	Preliminary Round	(Tunisia) Sfaxien	1–1			
