= Zanzibar Premier League =

- Founded: 1981; 45 years ago
- Country: Zanzibar, United Republic of Tanzania
- Confederation: CAF
- Number of clubs: 16
- Level on pyramid: 1
- Relegation to: Zanzibar Championship
- International cup(s): Champions League; Confederation Cup
- Current champions: KVZ (1st title) (2025–26)
- Most championships: KMKM (9 titles)

Zanzibar Premier League, also known as PBZ Premier League, is the top division of the Zanzibar Football Association. It was firstly created in 1926 and became official in 1981.

== Champions ==
- 1981 : Ujamaa
- 1981–82 : Ujamaa
- 1982–83 : Small Simba
- 1983–84 : KMKM
- 1984–85 : Small Simba
- 1985–86 : KMKM
- 1986–87 : Miembeni
- 1987–88 : Small Simba
- 1988–89 : Malindi
- 1989–90 : Malindi
- 1990–91 : Small Simba
- 1991–92 : Malindi
- 1992–93 : Shangani
- 1993–94 : Shangani
- 1994–95 : Small Simba
- 1995–96 : Mlandege
- 1996–97 : Mlandege
- 1997–98 : Mlandege
- 1998–99 : Mlandege
- 1999–2000 : Kipanga
- 2000–01 : Mlandege
- 2001–02 : Mlandege
- 2002–03 : Jamhuri
- 2003–04 : KMKM
- 2004–05 : Polisi
- 2005–06 : Polisi
- 2006–07 : Miembeni
- 2007–08 : Miembeni
- 2008–09 : Mafunzo
- 2009–10 : Zanzibar Ocean View
- 2010–11 : Mafunzo (mini-league)
- 2011–12 : Super Falcon (mini-league)
- 2012–13 : KMKM
- 2013–14 : KMKM
- 2014–15 : Mafunzo
- 2015–16 : Zimamoto
- 2016–17 : JKU
- 2017–18 : JKU
- 2018–19 : KMKM
- 2019–20 : Mlandege
- 2020–21 : KMKM
- 2021–22 : KMKM
- 2022–23 : KMKM
- 2023–24 : JKU
- 2024–25 : Mlandege
- 2025-26 : KVZ

=== Performance by club ===
Club	Titles	Last title
KMKM	9	2022–23
Mlandege FC	8	2024–25
Small Simba	5	1994–95
Malindi	3	1991–92
Mafunzo	3	2014–15
Miembeni	3	2007–08
JKU	3	2023–24
Shangani F.C.	2	1993–94
Polisi	2	2005–06
Ujamaa	2	1981–82
Kipanga	1	1999–2000
Jamhuri	1	2002–03
Zanzibar Ocean View	1	2009–10
Super Falcon	1	2011–12
Zimamoto	1	2015–16
KVZ FC	1	2025–26

=== Top goalscorers ===
Season	Top Scorer	Team	Goals
2005	(Zanzibar) Joseph Malik	Tembo	8
2008	Bakari Mohammed	Mundu	
2009	Mfanyeje Musa	Mundu	14
2020–21	(Zanzibar) Maabad Maulid	KVZ	17
2021–22	(Zanzibar) Maabad Maulid	KVZ	21
2022–23	(Tanzania) Yassin Mgaza	KMKM	17
2023–24	(Zanzibar) Suleiman Mwalim	KVZ	20
2024–25	(Zanzibar) Abdallah Iddi Pina	Mlandege	21
2025-26	Tariki Mikonga		21
2025-26	Michael Joseph	KVZ	21

Most time goalscorers

- 2 times.
  - Maabad Maulid (2020-21 and 2021-22).

=== Clean Sheets ===
Season	Goalkeeper	Team	Clean Sheet
2025-26	Hamad Ubwa	ZFF	12
