= Polisi S.C. =

Association football club in Zanzibar

Polisi SC
- Full name: Polisi Sports Club
- Ground: ..., Zanzibar
- Owner: Tanzania Police Academy
- Chairman: Camillus Wambura
- League: Zanzibar Premier League
- 2013–14: 2nd place

Polisi Sports Club is a football club from Zanzibar.

== Achievements ==
- Zanzibar Premier League : 2

2005, 2006.

- Nyerere Cup : 1

2001.

== Performance in CAF competitions ==
- CAF Champions League: 2 appearances

2006 – First Round
2007 – Preliminary Round

- CAF Confederation Cup: 1 appearance

2015 – Preliminary Round
