= Zimamoto F.C. =

Zimamoto FC
- Full name: Zimamoto Football Club
- Owner: Tanzania Police Academy

Zimamoto Football Club is a Tanzanian / Zanzibarian football club.

The team competes in the Zanzibar Premier League.

They competed in the CAF Champions League for the first time in 2017.

== Achievements ==
- Zanzibar Premier League: 1

2016

== Performance in CAF competitions ==
- CAF Champions League: 1 appearance

2017 – Preliminary Round
