= Miembeni S.C. =

Miembeni SC
- Full name: Miembeni Sport Club
- Nickname(s): Kwala
- Founded: 1945
- Ground: Amaan Stadium; Zanzibar (Tanzania)
- Capacity: 15,000
- Chairman: Amaani Ibrahim Makugu
- Manager: Ali Bushri
- League: Zanzibar Premier League
- 2009: 2nd

Miembeni Sport Club is a Zanzibari football club based in Unguja.

== Achievements ==
- Zanzibar Premier League: 3

1987, 2007, 2008

- Nyerere Cup: 3

1985, 1986, 1987

- Mapinduzi Cup: 2

2008, 2009

- Kagame Cup: 0

== Performance in CAF competitions ==
- CAF Champions League: 2 appearances

2008 – Preliminary Round
2009 – Preliminary Round

- CAF Confederation Cup: 1 appearance

2010 – Preliminary Round

- African Cup Winners' Cup: 3 appearances

1986 – Second Round
1987 – Second Round
1988 – First Round
