= JKU S.C. =

JKU SC
- Full name: Jeshi la Kujenga Uchumi Sports Club
- Ground: Amaan Stadium, Zanzibar
- Capacity: 15,000
- Owner: Tanzania People's Defence Force
- Manager: Salum Ali Haji
- League: Zanzibar Premier League
- 2023–2024: 1st place
Home colours	Away colours

Jeshi la Kujenga Uchumi Sports Club, or simply JKU SC is a football club from Zanzibar.

The team won the Nyerere Cup in 1974.

== Honours ==
- Zanzibar Premier League Champions (3)
  - Winners: 2017–18, 2018–19, 2023–24
- Nyerere Cup / Zanzibari Cup (2)
  - Winners: 1974–75, 2023–24

== Performance in CAF competitions ==
- CAF Champions League: 2 appearances

2018–19 – Preliminary Round
2024–25 – First Round

- CAF Confederation Cup: 2 appearances

2006 – Preliminary Round
2016 – First Round
2023–24 – First Round

- African Cup Winners' Cup: 1 appearance

1975 – First Round
