= 2025–26 Simba SC season =

Tanzanian football club season 2025-26

Simba Sports Club
2025–26 season
- Owner: Member of SSC 51% Mohammed Dewji 49%
- Chairman: Murtaza Mangungu
- Manager: Dimitar Pantev
- Stadium: Major General Isamuhyo Stadium; Benjamin Mkapa Stadium (for International Matches)
- NBC Premier League: 1st
- CRDB Bank Federation Cup: Round of 64
- Mapinduzi Cup: Semi-Finals
- Community Shield: Runner-up
- CAF Champions League: Group Stage
- All statistics correct as of 3 August 2025.

The 2025–26 season will be the 89th season in the history of Simba and the 60th consecutive season in the Premier League of Tanzanian mens' football. In addition to the domese, CRDB Bank Federation Cup, Muungano Cup and the CAF Champions League.

== Transfers ==
=== In ===
Date	Pos.	Player	From	Fee	Ref.
29 July 2025	DF	(South Africa) Rushine De Reuck	(South Africa) Mamelodi Sundowns	Undisclosed	
30 July 2025	MF	(Senegal) Alassane Kante	(Tunisia) CA Bizertin	€210K	
31 July 2025	MF	(Tanzania) Morice Abraham	Free Agent	Free	
31 July 2025	MF	(Tanzania) Hussein Semfuko	(Tanzania) Coastal Union	Undisclosed	
1 August 2025	FW	(Ghana) Jonathan Sowah	(Tanzania) Singida Black Stars	Undisclosed	
2 August 2025	FW	(Kenya) Mohammed Bajaber	Kenya Police	Undisclosed	
5 August 2025	DF	(Tanzania) Antony Mligo	(Tanzania) Namungo	Undisclosed	
14 August 2025	MF	(Guinea) Naby Camara	Free Agent	Free	
21 August 2025	MF	(South Africa) Neo Maema	(South Africa) Mamelodi Sundowns	Free	
28 August 2025	FW	(Tanzania) Selemani Mwalimu	(Morocco) Wydad AC	Loan	
3 September 2025	DF	(Tanzania) Wilson Nangu	JKT Tanzania	Undisclosed	
3 September 2025	GK	(Tanzania) Yakoub Suleiman	JKT Tanzania	Undisclosed	
9 September 2025	DF	(Tanzania) Vedastus Masinde	(Tanzania) TMA Stars	Undisclosed	

=== Out ===
Date	Pos.	Player	To	Fee	Ref.
12 July 2025	MF	(Tanzania) Omary A. Omary	(Tanzania) Mashujaa	Loan	
12 July 2025	MF	(Democratic Republic of the Congo) Fabrice Ngoma	Free Agent	End of contract	
12 July 2025	GK	(Tanzania) Aishi Manula	(Tanzania) Azam	Free	
12 July 2025	DF	(Burkina Faso) Valentin Nouma	Free Agent	Undisclosed	
13 July 2025	DF	(Tanzania) Hussein Kazi	(Tanzania) Namungo	Free	
13 July 2025	MF	(Nigeria) Augustine Okejepha	Free Agent	Undisclosed	
13 July 2025	DF	(Tanzania) Kevin Kijili	Free Agent	Undisclosed	
14 July 2025	FW	(Tanzania) Edwin Balua	(Cyprus) Enosis Neon Paralimni	Loan	
30 July 2025	DF	(Cameroon) Che Malone Fondoh	(Algeria) USM Alger	Undisclosed	
30 July 2025	DF	(Tanzania) Mohamed Zimbwe jr	(Tanzania) Young Africans	Free	
24 August 2025	FW	(Cameroon) Leonel Ateba	(Egypt) Al-Shorta	Undisclosed	

== Simba Day ==
It is 17th festival and special day for the Simba team to unveil and introduce its players, coaches, and the entire technical bench for the season.

10 September 2025 Simba Day	Simba	2-0	Gor Mahia	Dar es Salaam
20:00 UTC+3	Abdulazack Hamza; Steven Mukwala			Stadium: Benjamin Mkapa Stadium; Attendance: 60,000

== Players ==
=== Current squad ===
As of 12 September 2024

Note: Flags indicate national team as defined under FIFA eligibility rules; some limited exceptions apply. Players may hold more than one non-FIFA nationality.

No.	Pos.	Nation	Player
22	GK	TAN	Yakoub Suleiman
2	DF	CIV	Chamou Karaboue (vice-captain)
15	DF	TAN	David Kameta
23	DF	RSA	Rushine De Reuck (vice-captain)
4	MF	TAN	Vedastus Masinde
7	FW	ZAM	Joshua Mutale
10	MF	CIV	Jean Charles Ahoua
11	FW	UGA	Steven Mukwala
12	DF	TAN	Shomari Kapombe (Captain)
30	DF	GUI	Naby Camara
14	DF	TAN	Abdulrazack Hamza
5	DF	TAN	Antony Mligo
34	FW	COD	Elie Mpanzu

No.	Pos.	Nation	Player
19	MF	TAN	Mzamiru Yassin
3	FW	CMR	Jonathan Sowah
21	MF	TAN	Yusuph Kagoma
23	MF	TAN	Awesu Ally Awesu
24	MF	SEN	Alassane Kanté
31	DF	TAN	Wilson Nangu
36	FW	TAN	Ladaki Chasambi
18	MF	TAN	Morice Abraham
38	FW	TAN	Denis Kibu
40	GK	GUI	Moussa Camara
35	MF	GDR	Neo Maema
36	MF	TAN	Hussein Semfuko
17	FW	KEN	Mohammed Bajaber
28	GK	TAN	Hussein Abeil
40	FW	TAN	Selemani Mwalimu

== Friendlies ==
August 2025 Friendly	Kahraba Ismailia	0-2	Simba	Ismailia
16:00 UTC+2			Bajaber; Sowah	Stadium: Kahraba Ismailia Stadium; Attendance: Closed Door

17 August 2025 Friendly	Simba	3-4	ENPPI	Cairo
16:00 UTC+2				Stadium: Petrosport Stadium; Attendance: Closed Door

20 August 2025 Friendly	Simba	1-0	Al-Zulfi	Cairo
16:00 UTC+2	Jean Ahoua			Stadium: Petrosport Stadium; Attendance: Closed Door

24 August 2025 Friendly	Wadi Degla	0-2	Simba	Cairo
16:00 UTC+2			Elie Mpanzu; Kibu Denis	Stadium: Petrosport Stadium; Attendance: Closed Door

26 August 2025 Friendly	Simba	1-1	FC Fassell	Cairo
16:00 UTC+2				Stadium: Petrosport Stadium; Attendance: Closed Door

== Competitions ==
=== Overall ===
As of 19 January 2026

Competition	First match	Last match	Starting round	Final position	Record							
Competition	First match	Last match	Starting round	Final position	Pld	W	D	L	GF	GA	GD	Win %
NBC Premier League	16 September 2025	23 May 2026	Matchday 1	TBD	7	5	1	1	14	4	+10	71.43
CRDB Bank Federation Cup	TBD	27 May 2026	Round of 64	TBD	0	0	0	0	0	0	+0	—
CAF Champions League	20 September 2026	TBD	Qualifying Rounds	TBD	7	2	2	3	6	5	+1	28.57
Muungano Cup	21 April 2026	26 April 2026	Semi-Final	TBD	0	0	0	0	0	0	+0	—
Community Shield	16 September 2025		Finals	Runner-up	1	0	0	1	0	1	−1	0.00
2026 Mapinduzi Cup	3 January 2026	8 January 2026	Group Stage	Semi-final	3	2	0	1	3	2	+1	66.67
Total					18	9	3	6	23	12	+11	50.00

=== Tanzanian Premier League ===
==== Results summary ====
Overall								Home						Away					
Pld	W	D	L	GF	GA	GD	Pts	W	D	L	GF	GA	GD	W	D	L	GF	GA	GD
3	3	0	0	8	1	+7	9	2	0	0	6	0	+6	1	0	0	2	1	+1

==== Results by round ====
Round	1	2	3	4	5	6	7	8	9	10	11	12	13	14	15	16	17	18	19	20	21	22	23	24	25	26	27	28	29	30
Ground	H	H	H	A	H	A	A	H	A	H	H	A	A	A	H	A	H	H	A	H	A	H	A	H	A	H	A	H	H	A
Result	W	W	W																											
Position	5	1	2																											
Points	3	6	9																											

Updated to match(es) played on 25 September 2025. Source:
A = Away; H = Home; W = Win; D = Draw; L = Loss

==== Score overview ====
Win Draw Loss

Opposition	Home score	Away score	Aggregate score	Double
Azam				
Coastal Union				
Dodoma Jiji				
Fountain Gate	3–0			
JKT Tanzania		2–1		
KMC				
Mashujaa				
Mbeya City				
Mtibwa Sugar				
Namungo	3–0			
Pamba				
Prisons				
Singida Black Stars				
Tabora United				
Young Africans				

===== Matches =====
The league schedule was released on 29 August 2025

25 September 2025 Round 2	Simba	3–0	Fountain Gate	Dar es Salaam
19:00 UTC+3	De Reuck 6'; Jean Ahoua 37'; Sowah 58'	Report		Stadium: Benjamin Mkapa Stadium; Referee: Ludovick Charles

1 October 2025 Round 3	Simba	3–0	Namungo	Dar es Salaam
20:15 UTC+3	Karaboue 37'; De Reuck 62'; Mwalimu 84'	Report		Stadium: Benjamin Mkapa Stadium

30 October 2025 Round 1	Tabora United	v	Simba	Tabora
16:00 UTC+3				Stadium: Ali Hassan Mwinyi Stadium

2 November 2025 Round 4	Simba	v	Azam	Dar es Salaam
16:00 UTC+3				Stadium: KMC Complex

5 November 2025 Round 5	JKT Tanzania	v	Simba	Dar es Salaam
16:00 UTC+3				Stadium: Mej.Gen.isamuhyo Stadium

3 December 2025 Round 10	Dodoma Jiji	v	Simba	Dodoma
19:00 UTC+3				Stadium: Jamhuri Stadium (Dodoma)

10 December 2025 Round 6	Tanzania Prisons	v	Simba	Mbeya
16:00 UTC+3				Stadium: Sokoine Stadium

13 December 2025 Round 7	Young Africans	v	Simba	Dar es Salaam
17:00 UTC+3				Stadium: Benjamin Mkapa Stadium

19 February 2026 Round 8	Simba	v	Mashujaa	Dar es Salaam
16:00 UTC+3				Stadium: KMC Complex

23 February 2026 Round 9	Simba	v	Coastal Union	Dar es Salaam
16:00 UTC+3				Stadium: KMC Complex

25 February 2026 Round 11	Pamba	v	Simba	Mwanza
16:00 UTC+3				Stadium: CCM Kirumba Stadium

28 February 2026 Round 12	Simba	v	Mbeya City	Dar es Salaam
16:00 UTC+3				Stadium: KMC Complex

TBC Round 13	Simba	v	Mtibwa Sugar	Dar es Salaam
TBC UTC+3				Stadium: KMC Complex

TBC Round 14	Singida Black Stars	v	Simba	Singida
TBC UTC+3				Stadium: Liti Stadium

TBC Round 15	KMC	v	Simba	Dar es Salaam
TBC UTC+3				Stadium: KMC Complex

TBC Round 16	Simba	v	Tabora United	Dar es Salaam
TBC UTC+3				Stadium: KMC Complex

5 March 2026 Round 17	Fountain Gate	v	Simba	Manyara
16:00 UTC+3				Stadium: Tanzanite Kwaraa Stadium

TBC Round 18	Namungo	v	Simba	Lindi
TBC UTC+3				Stadium: Majaliwa Stadium

TBC Round 19	Azam	v	Simba	Dar es Salaam
TBC UTC+3				Stadium: Azam Complex

TBC Round 20	Simba	v	JKT Tanzania	Dar es Salaam
TBC UTC+3				Stadium: KMC Complex

TBC Round 21	Simba	v	Tanzania Prisons	Dar es Salaam
TBC UTC+3				Stadium: KMC Complex

4 April 2026 Round 22	Simba	v	Young Africans	TBC
TBC UTC+3				Stadium: TBC

TBC Round 23	Mashujaa	v	Simba	Kigoma
TBC UTC+3				Stadium: Lake Tanganyika Stadium

TBC Round 24	Coastal Union	v	Simba	Tanga
TBC UTC+3				Stadium: Mkwakwani Stadium

TBC Round 25	Simba	v	Dodoma Jiji	Dar es Salaam
TBC UTC+3				Stadium: KMC Complex

TBC Round 26	Simba	v	Pamba	Dar es Salaam
TBC UTC+3				Stadium: KMC Complex

TBC Round 27	Mbeya City	v	Simba	Mbeya
TBC UTC+3				Stadium: Sokoine Stadium

14 May 2026 Round 28	Mtibwa Sugar	v	Simba	Morogoro
16:00 UTC+3				Stadium: Jamhuri Stadium (Morogoro)

20 May 2026 Round 29	Simba	v	Singida Black Stars	Dar es Salaam
16:00 UTC+3				Stadium: KMC Complex

23 May 2026 Round 30	Simba	v	KMC	Dar es Salaam
16:00 UTC+3				Stadium: KMC Complex

=== Community Shield ===
16 September 2025 Community Shield	Young Africans	1-0	Simba	Dar es Salaam
17:00 UTC+3	Shedrak Boka (yellow card) 32'; Pacóme Zouzoua 54'; Diarra (yellow card) 85'; Aziz Andabwile (yellow card) 90+11'	Report	Alassane Kante (yellow card) 54'; Kapombe (yellow card) 56'; Yusuph Kagoma (yellow card) 60'; Naby Camara (yellow card) 90+10'	Stadium: Benjamin Mkapa Stadium; Attendance: 60,000; Referee: Ahmed Arajiga

=== CAF Champions League ===
==== First round ====
The draw for the qualifying rounds was held on 9 August 2025, 10:00 GMT (13:00 local time, UTC+3), in Dar es Salaam, Tanzania.

20 September 2025 First leg	Gaborone United (Botswana)	0–1	Simba	Gaborone
TBD UTC+2		Report	Elie Mpanzu 15'	Stadium: Botswana National Stadium

28 September 2025 Second leg	Simba	1–1	Gaborone United	Dar es Salaam
16:00 UTC+3	Jean Ahoua 43' (pen.)	Report	Lebogang Ditsele 66' (pen.)	Stadium: Benjamin Mkapa Stadium

==== Second round ====
19 October 2025 First leg	Nsingizini Hotspurs	0-3	Simba	Lobamba
15:00 UTC+2		Report	W.Nangu 45+1'; Kibu 84', 90'	Stadium: Somhlolo National Stadium

26 October 2025 Second leg	Simba	0-0	Nsingizini Hotspurs	Dar es Salaam
16:00 UTC+3		Report		Stadium: Benjamin Mkapa Stadium

==== Group stage ====
The draw for the group stage was held on 3 November 2025, 12:00 GMT (14:00 local time, UTC+2), in Johannesburg, South Africa.

Pos	Team	Pld	W	D	L	GF	GA	GD	Pts	Qualification	SML	EST	APL	SSC
1	(Mali) Stade Malien	6	3	2	1	5	2	+3	11	Advance to knockout stage	—	1–0	2–0	2–1
2	(Tunisia) Espérance de Tunis	6	2	3	1	6	4	+2	9	Advance to knockout stage	0–0	—	2–0	1–0
3	(Angola) Petro de Luanda	6	1	3	2	3	6	−3	6		0–0	1–1	—	1–1
4	(Tanzania) Simba	6	1	2	3	5	7	−2	5		1–0	2–2	0–1	—

Source: CAF

21–22 November 2025 Round 1	Simba (Tanzania)	v	(Angola) Petro de Luanda	Dar es Salaam
--:-- UTC+3				Stadium: Benjamin Mkapa Stadium

28–29 November 2025 Round 2	Stade Malien (Mali)	v	(Tanzania) Simba	Bamako
--:-- UTC+0				Stadium: Stade du 26 Mars

23–24 January 2026 Round 3	Espérance de Tunis (Tunisia)	v	(Tanzania) Simba	Tunis
--:-- UTC+1				Stadium: Hammadi Agrebi Stadium

30–31 January 2026 Round 4	Simba (Tanzania)	v	(Tunisia) Espérance de Tunis	Dar es Salaam
--:-- UTC+3				Stadium: Benjamin Mkapa Stadium

6–7 February 2026 Round 5	Petro de Luanda (Angola)	v	(Tanzania) Simba	Luanda
--:-- UTC+1				Stadium: Estádio 11 de Novembro

13–14 February 2026 Round 6	Simba (Tanzania)	v	(Mali) Stade Malien	Dar es Salaam
--:-- UTC+3				Stadium: Benjamin Mkapa Stadium

== Statistics ==
=== Squad statistics ===
No.	Pos	Nat	Player	Total		NBC Premier League		CAF Champions League		CRDB Bank Federation Cup		Muungano Cup		Community Shield	
No.	Pos	Nat	Player	Apps	Goals	Apps	Goals	Apps	Goals	Apps	Goals	Apps	Goals	Apps	Goals
Goalkeepers
22	GK	(Tanzania)	Yakoub Suleiman	3	0	1	0	1+1	0	0	0	0	0	0	0
26	GK	(Guinea)	Moussa Camara	4	0	1	0	2	0	0	0	0	0	1	0
28	GK	(Tanzania)	Hussein Abel	0	0	0	0	0	0	0	0	0	0	0	0
Defenders
2	DF	(Ivory Coast)	Chamou Karaboue	5	1	2	1	2	0	0	0	0	0	0+1	0
4	DF	(Tanzania)	Vedastus Masinde	0	0	0	0	0	0	0	0	0	0	0	0
5	DF	(Tanzania)	Anthony Mligo	5	0	1	0	3	0	0	0	0	0	0+1	0
12	DF	(Tanzania)	Shomari Kapombe	6	0	2	0	3	0	0	0	0	0	1	0
14	DF	(Tanzania)	Abdulrazack Hamza	1	0	0	0	0	0	0	0	0	0	1	0
15	DF	(Tanzania)	David Duchu	1	0	0+1	0	0	0	0	0	0	0	0	0
23	DF	(South Africa)	Rushine De Reuck	6	2	2	2	3	0	0	0	0	0	1	0
30	DF	(Guinea)	Naby Camara	4	0	1	0	2	0	0	0	0	0	1	0
31	DF	(Tanzania)	Wilson Nangu	3	1	0+1	0	1+1	1	0	0	0	0	0	0
Midfielders
8	MF	(Senegal)	Alassane Kante	5	0	1+1	0	2	0	0	0	0	0	0+1	0
10	MF	(Ivory Coast)	Jean Charles Ahoua	6	2	1+1	1	3	1	0	0	0	0	1	0
18	MF	(Tanzania)	Morice Abraham	4	0	1+1	0	1+1	0	0	0	0	0	0	0
19	MF	(Tanzania)	Mzamiru Yassin	2	0	1	0	0+1	0	0	0	0	0	0	0
21	MF	(Tanzania)	Yusuph Kagoma	5	0	2	0	1+1	0	0	0	0	0	1	0
33	MF	(Tanzania)	Awesu Awesu	0	0	0	0	0	0	0	0	0	0	0	0
35	MF	(South Africa)	Neo Maema	5	0	0+2	0	2	0	0	0	0	0	0+1	0
36	MF	(Tanzania)	Ladack Chasambi	0	0	0	0	0	0	0	0	0	0	0	0
37	MF	(Tanzania)	Hussein Semfuko	1	0	0+1	0	0	0	0	0	0	0	0	0
Forwards
3	FW	(Ghana)	Jonathan Sowah	3	1	1	1	1+1	0	0	0	0	0	0	0
7	FW	(Zambia)	Joshua Mutale	3	0	1	0	1+1	0	0	0	0	0	0	0
11	FW	(Uganda)	Steven Mukwala	4	0	1	0	0+2	0	0	0	0	0	1	0
17	FW	(Kenya)	Mohammed Bajaber	0	0	0	0	0	0	0	0	0	0	0	0
34	FW	(Democratic Republic of the Congo)	Elie Mpanzu	6	1	2	0	3	1	0	0	0	0	1	0
38	FW	(Tanzania)	Kibu Denis	5	2	1+1	0	2+	2	0	0	0	0	1	0
40	FW	(Tanzania)	Selemani Mwalimu	4	1	0+1	1	2	0	0	0	0	0	0+1	0

=== Goals ===
As of 20 October 2025

Rank	Player	NBC Premier	FA	CCL	Muungano	Total
1	(South Africa) Rushine De Reuck	2	0	0	0	2
2	(Tanzania) Kibu Denis	0	0	2	0	2
3	(Ivory Coast) Jean Ahoua	1	0	1	0	2
4	(Democratic Republic of the Congo) Elie Mpanzu	0	0	1	0	1
5	(Ghana) Jonathan Sowah	1	0	0	0	1
6	(Ivory Coast) Chamou Karaboue	1	0	0	0	1
7	(Tanzania) Selemani Mwalimu	1	0	0	0	1
8	(Tanzania) Wilson Nangu	0	0	1	0	1
Total		6	0	5	0	11

=== Assist ===
As of 20 October 2025

Rank	Player	NBC Premier	FA	CCL	Muungano	Total
1	(South Africa) Neo Maema	1	0	1	0	2
2	(Democratic Republic of the Congo) Elie Mpanzu	1	0	0	0	1
3	(Tanzania) Shomari Kapombe	0	0	1	0	1
4	(Tanzania) Yusuph Kagoma	1	0	0	0	1
5	(Ivory Coast) Jean Ahoua	1	0	0	0	1
6	(Zambia) Joshua Mutale	1	0	0	0	1
7	(Cameroon) Jonathan Sowah	0	0	1	0	1
8	(Tanzania) Morice Abraham	0	0	1	0	1
Total		5	0	4	0	9

=== Clean sheets ===
As of 20 October 2025

Rank	Player	NBC Premier	FA	CCL	Muungano	Total
1	(Guinea) Moussa Camara	1	0	1	0	2
1	(Tanzania) Yakoub Suleiman	1	0	1	0	2
Total		2	0	2	0	4

=== Goal Contributions ===
As of 20 October 2025

Rank	Player	Goal	Assist	Total
1	(Ivory Coast) Jean Ahoua	2	1	3
2	(Democratic Republic of the Congo) Elie Mpanzu	1	1	2
3	(South Africa) De Reuck	2	0	2
4	(Tanzania) Kibu	2	0	2
5	(South Africa) Maema	0	2	2
Total		7	4	11

== Awards ==
=== Player of the Matchday ===
Month(s)	Competition(s)	Player(s)	Opponent(s)
September	Premier League	(Ivory Coast) Jean Ahoua	Fountain Gate
October	Premier League	(South Africa) De Reuck	Namungo
