= 2025–26 Tanzanian Premier League =

Tanzanian Premier League
- Season: 2025–26
- Dates: 17 September 2025 – 30 June 2026
- Champions: Young Africans
- Relegated: KMC; Mtibwa Sugar; Prisons
- Champions League: Simba; Young Africans
- Confederation Cup: Azam; Singida Black Stars
- Matches: 139
- Goals: 247 (1.78 per match)
- Top goalscorer: Feisal Salum (14 goals)
- Biggest home win: Young Africans 6–0 Mashujaa (19 January 2026)
- Biggest away win: KMC 0–3 Mbeya City (18 October 2025); Dodoma Jiji 0–3 Pamba (25 October 2025); Singida Black Stars 1–3 TRA United (6 December 2025)
- Highest scoring: Young Africans 6–0 Mashujaa (19 January 2026)
- Longest winning run: 8 matches Young Africans
- Longest unbeaten run: 22 matches Young Africans; Azam
- Longest winless run: 11 matches KMC
- Longest losing run: 6 matches KMC
- All statistics correct as of 16 June 2026.

The 2025–26 Tanzanian Premier League (known as the NBC Premier League for sponsorship reasons) was the 61st season of the Tanzanian Premier League, the top-tier football league in Tanzania (mainland only), since its establishment in 1965. The season started on 17 September 2025 and ended on 30 June 2026.

== Teams ==
The league consisted of 16 teams; the top 14 teams from the previous season, and two teams promoted from the Tanzanian Championship League. Young Africans entered the season as defending champions (for the fourth consecutive season).

=== Changes from previous season ===
▲ Promoted from 2024–25 Championship League	▼ Relegated to 2025–26 Championship League
Mtibwa Sugar; Mbeya City	Kagera Sugar; KenGold

The promoted teams were the 2024–25 Tanzanian Championship League champions Mtibwa Sugar (returning to the Premier League after a single-season absence) and runners-up Mbeya City (returning to the Premier League after a two-season absence). They replaced the 2024–25 Tanzanian Premier League bottom two teams, Kagera Sugar and KenGold.

=== Locations ===
Location of clubs in Tanzania for the 2025–26 Tanzanian Premier League season

=== Stadiums ===
Note: Table lists in alphabetical order.

Team	Location	Stadium (Note: Main stadiums for the 2025–26 season are listed only. Clubs are allowed to play two selected matches at alternative venues; instead of their regular home stadium)	Capacity
Azam	Dar es Salaam (Chamazi)	Chamazi Stadium	10,000
Coastal Union	Tanga	Mkwakwani Stadium	15,000
Dodoma Jiji	Dodoma	Jamhuri Stadium Dodoma	30,000
Fountain Gate	Manyara (Babati)	Tanzanite Kwaraa	10,000
JKT Tanzania	Dar es Salaam (Mbweni)	Major General Isamuhyo Stadium	15,000
KMC	Dar es Salaam (Mwenge)	KMC Complex	6,000
Mashujaa	Kigoma	Lake Tanganyika Stadium	20,000
Mbeya City	Mbeya	Sokoine Stadium	20,000
Mtibwa Sugar	Morogoro (Turiani)	Jamhuri Stadium Morogoro	20,000
Namungo	Lindi	Majaliwa Stadium	20,000
Pamba	Mwanza	CCM Kirumba Stadium	35,000
Prisons	Mbeya	Sokoine Stadium	20,000
Simba	Dar es Salaam (Kariakoo)	KMC Complex	10,000
Singida Black Stars	Singida (Mtipa)	Liti Stadium	35,000
TRA United	Tabora	Ali Hassan Mwinyi Stadium	35,000
Young Africans	Dar es Salaam (Kariakoo)	Benjamin Mkapa Stadium	60,000

== League table ==
Pos	Team	Pld	W	D	L	GF	GA	GD	Pts	Qualification or relegation
1	Young Africans (C)	30	23	6	1	71	9	+62	75	Qualification for the Champions League
2	Simba	30	22	7	1	54	11	+43	73	Qualification for the Champions League
3	Azam	30	18	10	2	46	12	+34	64	Qualification for the Confederation Cup (Note: Since the 2025–26 Tanzania FA Cup winners, Simba, qualified for the Champions League via league position, the Confederation Cup spot awarded to the cup winners was passed to the fourth-placed team.)
4	Singida Black Stars	30	15	5	10	47	35	+12	50	Qualification for the Confederation Cup
5	TRA United	30	11	10	9	33	28	+5	43	
6	JKT Tanzania	30	10	12	8	30	33	−3	42	
7	Pamba Jiji	30	9	9	12	32	35	−3	36	
8	Coastal Union	30	9	9	12	31	37	−6	36	
9	Dodoma Jiji	30	8	11	11	25	36	−11	35	
10	Namungo	30	7	13	10	25	32	−7	34	
11	Mashujaa	30	7	12	11	15	27	−12	33	
12	Fountain Gate	30	9	6	15	25	44	−19	33	
13	Prisons (R)	30	9	5	16	23	41	−18	32	Qualification for the Tanzanian Premier League play-off
14	Mbeya City (O)	30	7	9	14	24	41	−17	30	Qualification for the Tanzanian Premier League play-off
15	Mtibwa Sugar (R)	30	6	9	15	25	48	−23	27	Relegation to the Tanzanian Championship League
16	KMC (R)	30	2	3	25	16	53	−37	9	Relegation to the Tanzanian Championship League

Source: Tanzania Premier League Board Flashscore, Soccerway
Rules for classification: 1) Points; 2) Head-to-head results; 3) Goal difference; 4) Goals scored; 5) Head-to-head goal difference; 6) Head-to-head goals scored; 7) Play-off
(C) Champions; (O) Play-off winners; (R) Relegated

== Results ==
Each team plays each other twice (30 matches each), once at home and once away.

Home \ Away	AZA	COA	DOM	FOU	JKT	KMC	MAS	MBE	MTI	NAM	PAM	PRI	SIM	SBS	TRA	YGA
Azam	—	3–0	2–0	0–0	3–0	3–0	2–0	3–0	3–0	1–0	2–0	2–0	0–0	0–0	2–0	0–0
Coastal Union	0–2	—	3–1	1–1	1–2	1–1	1–0	2–0	1–1	1–1	2–1	1–0	1–2	2–1	1–1	0–1
Dodoma Jiji	0–3	2–0	—	3–0	0–0	2–1	1–1	1–1	0–0	0–0	0–3 (Note: Pamba Jiji awarded a 0–3 win after the match called off while in progress.)	1–0	0–0	1–1	3–0	3–2
Fountain Gate	0–2	3–2	1–0	—	0–2	1–0	0–1	0–1	2–1	1–1	1–2	1–0	0–3	4–3	1–4	0–2
JKT Tanzania	1–1	1–1	0–1	2–2	—	1–0	1–0	1–0	0–0	1–1	3–0	0–1	1–2	1–2	1–0	0–3
KMC	0–2	1–3	1–0	2–3	0–1	—	1–0	0–3	0–0	2–3	0–1	1–1	0–2	0–1	0–1	0–1
Mashujaa	0–0	0–0	0–0	1–1	1–1	2–0	—	1–0	1–0	1–0	0–0	0–1	0–3	1–1	1–0	0–2
Mbeya City	0–0	0–2	1–1	0–1	2–2	3–2	0–0	—	1–0	0–1	1–1	1–2	0–1	1–4	0–0	0–0
Mtibwa Sugar	0–3	0–0	0–1	2–0	2–2	4–3	1–3	2–1	—	1–1	1–0	2–1	0–3	1–3	2–1	1–1
Namungo	1–1	1–0	2–0	0–0	2–2	1–0	0–0	1–1	2–1	—	1–1	1–0	1–3	1–1	0–0	0–1
Pamba Jiji	2–2	3–0	0–0	1–0	1–2	3–0	2–1	0–2	4–0	1–0	—	2–3	1–1	1–1	0–0	0–3
Prisons	0–0	1–4	3–1	1–0	0–0	1–0	0–0	1–2	2–1	3–2	0–0	—	0–2	1–2	0–3	0–1
Simba	0–2	2–0	1–0	3–0	1–0	1–0	2–0	3–0	1–1	3–0	2–1	4–0	—	2–0	3–0	2–2
Singida Black Stars	1–2	1–0	5–0	1–0	0–1	1–0	1–0	4–1	4–0	1–0	3–1	3–1	1–2	—	1–3	0–3
TRA United	4–1	1–1	2–2	1–2	1–1	3–0	0–0	0–2	2–1	2–0	1–0	1–0	0–0	2–0	—	0–0
Young Africans	3–0	3–0	3–1	2–0	5–0	4–1	6–0	6–0	2–0	3–1	3–0	3–0	0–0	3–0	3–0	—

Source: Flashscore, Soccerway
Legend: Blue = home team win; Yellow = draw; Red = away team win.

=== Results by round ===
Team ╲ Round	1	2	3	4	5	6	7	8	9	10	11	12	13	14	15	16	17
Azam	W	D	D	D	W	W	D	W	W	W	D	D	W	D	D		
Coastal Union	W	L	L	D	D	W	D	L	L	L	D	D	L	W	D	L	
Dodoma Jiji	L	D	W	L	D	L	L	D	D	W	L	W	D	W	W	D	L
Fountain Gate	L	L	L	W	D	W	L	W	L	L	D	D	L	L	W	D	
JKT Tanzania	D	W	D	D	D	L	W	W	W	D	W	D	L	W	W	D	L
KMC	W	L	L	L	L	L	L	D	L	L	D	L	W	L	L	L	
Mashujaa	D	W	L	L	D	W	W	D	D	L	L	L	D	L	W	D	D
Mbeya City	W	L	D	W	L	D	L	L	L	L	L	D	D	W	L	L	
Mtibwa Sugar	L	W	D	D	L	D	W	D	D	W	W	W	D	L	L	L	D
Namungo	D	W	L	D	L	D	W	W	W	W	D	D	L	L	L	D	L
Pamba Jiji	D	L	D	W	W	D	W	W	D	L	D	L	W	W	D	D	
Prisons	L	L	W	W	L	L	D	L	D	L	D	L	W	L	D	L	L
Simba	W	W	W	W	L	D	W	W	W	D	D	W	D	W			
Singida Black Stars	W	W	D	D	L	D	L	W	W	D	W	L	L	W	W		
TRA United	D	D	D	W	L	L	W	W	L	D	L	L	W	W	D	L	
Young Africans	W	D	W	W	W	W	W	W	W	W	D	W	W	D	D	D	

Updated to match(es) played on 22 March 2026. Source: LiveScore
W = Win; D = Draw; L = Loss

== Tanzanian Premier League play-off ==
The 13th and 14th-placed teams (Prisons and Mbeya City) qualified for the Tanzanian Premier League play-off (held over two legs), alongside the 3rd and 4th-placed teams from the 2025–26 Tanzanian Championship League (Polisi Tanzania and Mbeya Kwanza). The Championship teams qualified for the quarter-finals, and the Premier League teams qualified for the semi-finals; the quarter-final winners then face the semi-final losers for the final place in the 2026–27 Tanzanian Premier League.

=== Quarter-finals ===
==== First leg ====
28 June 2026	Mbeya Kwanza	0–4	Polisi Tanzania	Mtwara
14:00				Stadium: Nangwanda Sijaona Stadium

==== Second leg ====
5 July 2026	Polisi Tanzania	3–1 (7–1 agg.)	Mbeya Kwanza	Moshi
14:00				Stadium: Ushirika Stadium

=== Semi-finals ===
==== First leg ====
5 July 2026	Mbeya City	2–0	Prisons	Mbeya
14:00				Stadium: Sokoine Stadium

==== Second leg ====
8 July 2026	Prisons	0–0 (0–2 agg.)	Mbeya City	Mbeya
14:00				Stadium: Sokoine Stadium

=== Finals ===
==== First leg ====
12 July 2026	Polisi Tanzania	4–0	Prisons	Moshi
				Stadium: Ushirika Stadium

==== Second leg ====
16 July 2026	Prisons	1–0 (1–4 agg.)	Polisi Tanzania	Mbeya
				Stadium: Sokoine Stadium

== Season statistics ==
=== Top scorers ===
As of 16 June 2026

Rank	Player	Club	Goals
1	(Tanzania) Feisal Salum	Azam	14
2	(Uganda) Allan Okello	Young Africans	11
3	(Zimbabwe) Prince Dube	Young Africans	9
4	(Tanzania) Mudathir Yahya	Young Africans	9
5	(Burundi) Mossi Nduwumwe	Singida Black Stars	9
6	(Kenya) Mathew Tegisi	Pamba Jiji	8
7	(Democratic Republic of the Congo) Fabrice Ngoy	Namungo	8
8	(Tanzania) Salehe Karabaka	JKT Tanzania	8
9	(Tanzania) Iddy Nado	Azam	8
10	(Zambia) Clatous Chama	Simba	8

=== Assist ===
As of 16 June 2026

Rank	Player	Club	Assist
1	(Tanzania) Feisal Salum	Azam	8
2	(Democratic Republic of the Congo) Elie Mpanzu	Simba	8
3	(Uganda) Allan Okello	Young Africans	7
4	(Kenya) Duke Abuya	Young Africans	6
5	(Democratic Republic of the Congo) Maxi Nzengeli	Young Africans	6
6	(Zambia) Clatous Chama	Simba	6
7	(Tanzania) Iddy Nado	Azam	6
8	(Zimbabwe) Prince Dube	Young Africans	5
9	(South Africa) Neo Maema	Simba	5
10	(Ghana) Ibrahim Imoro	Singida Black Stars	4

=== Clean sheets ===
As of 16 June 2026

Rank	Player	Club	Clean sheets
1	(Mali) Djigui Diarra	Young Africans	14
2	(Tanzania) Aishi Manula	Azam	12
3	(Niger) djibrilla kassali	Simba	12
4	(Gabon) Jean Noel	TRA United	11
5	(Tanzania) Zuberi Foba	Azam	8
6	(Tanzania) Erick Johora	Mashujaa	7
7	(Tanzania) Yona Amosi	Pamba Jiji	7
8	(Tanzania) Ramadhan Chalamanda	JKT Tanzania	6
9	(Tanzania) Mussa Mbisa	Tanzania Prisons	6
10	(Tanzania) Daniel Mgore	Dodoma Jiji	5

== Awards ==
As of 3 February 2026

=== Player of the Matchday ===
Month	M/N	Player	Club	Score	Against
September	1	(Tanzania) Darueshi Saliboko	KMC	1–0	Dodoma Jiji
September	2	(Tanzania) Cleophance Mkandala	Coastal Union	1–0	Tanzania Prisons
September	3	(Tanzania) Habib Kyombo	Mbeya City	1–0	Fountain Gate
September	4	(Tanzania) Paul Peter	JKT Tanzania	1–1	Mashujaa
September	5	(Tanzania) Cyprian Kipenye	Namungo	1–1	Pamba Jiji
September	9	(Tanzania) Iddi Kipagwile	Dodoma Jiji	2–2	TRA United
September	10	(Tanzania) Abdulmalik Zakaria	Mashujaa	1–0	Mtibwa Sugar
September	11	(Ghana) Daniel Amoah	Namungo	1–0	Tanzania Prisons
September	12	(Tanzania) Ally Msengi	JKT Tanzania	2–1	Coastal Union
September	13	(Uganda) Khalid Aucho	Singida Black stars	1–0	KMC
September	14	(Democratic Republic of the Congo) Maxi Nzegeli	Young Africans	3–0	Pamba Jiji
September	15	(Tunisia) Baraket Hmidi	Azam	2–0	Mbeya City
September	16	(Ivory Coast) Jean Ahoua	Simba	3–0	Fountain Gate
September	17	(Tanzania) Oscar Mwajanga	Tanzania Prisons	1–0	KMC
September	18	(Tanzania) Yassin Mgaza	Dodoma Jiji	2–0	Coastal Union
September	19	(Tanzania) Andrew Simchimba	Mtibwa Sugar	2–0	Fountain Gate
September	20	(Tanzania) Kevin Nashon	Pamba Jiji	0–0	TRA United
September	21	(Kenya) Elvis Rupia	Singida Black Stars	1–0	Mashujaa
September	22	(Tanzania) Baraka Maranyingi	Mbeya City	0–0	Young Africans
October	23	(Tanzania) Paul Peter (2)	JKT Tanzania	1–1	Azam
October	24	(South Africa) Rushine De Reuck	Simba	3–0	Namungo
October	25	(Uganda) Peter Lwasa	Pamba	2–1	Mashujaa
October	26	(Tanzania) Juma Abushiri	Fountain Gate	1–0	Dodoma Jiji
October	27	(Tanzania) Mateo Antony	Mbeya City	3–0	KMC
October	28	(Tanzania) Haroun Evody	Mtibwa Sugar	0–0	Coastal Union
October	29	(Tanzania) Alli Machupa	Namungo	1–1	JKT Tanzania
October	33	(Tanzania) Jeremiah Juma	Prisons	2–1	Mbeya City
October	34	(Tanzania) Mohammed Mussa	Mashujaa	0–0	TRA United
October	35	(Tanzania) Cleophance Mkandala (2)	Coastal Union	1–1	Fountain Gate
October	36	(Tanzania) Abdi Banda	Dodoma Jiji	0–0	Mtibwa Sugar
October	41	(Tanzania) Vitalis Mayanga	Mbeya City	2–2	JKT Tanzania
October	42	(Tanzania) Ismail Kada	Fountain Gate	1–0	KMC
October	43	(Tanzania) Erick Johora	Mashujaa	1–0	Namungo
October	44	Postponed		Pamba Jiji won the game	
October	6	(Tanzania) Mohamed Zimbwe	Young Africans	2–0	Mtibwa Sugar
November	40	(Tanzania) Kevin Nashon (2)	Pamba Jiji	1–1	Singida Black Stars
November	38	(Tanzania) Wilson Nangu	Simba	2–1	JKT Tanzania
November	37	(Ivory Coast) Pacóme Zouzoua	Young Africans	4–1	KMC
November	39	(Democratic Republic of the Congo) Fabrice Ngoy	Namungo	1–1	Azam
November	49	(Tanzania) Anuary Kilimile	JKT Tanzania	1–0	KMC
November	50	(Tanzania) Andrew Chamungu	Namungo	2–0	Dodoma Jiji
November	51	(Tanzania) Ramadhan Salum	TRA United	1–0	Prisons
November	52	(Tanzania) Jaffary Kibaya	Mashujaa	1–0	Mbeya City
November	53	(Uganda) Peter Lwasa (2)	Pamba Jiji	1–0	Fountain Gate
November	57	(Tanzania) Erick Kyaruzi	Mtibwa Sugar	0–0	KMC
November	58	(Tanzania) Maabad Maabad	Coastal Union	2–0	Mbeya City
November	60	(Tanzania) Henry David	Fountain Gate	1–0	Prisons
November	59	(Tanzania) Salehe Karabaka	JKT Tanzania	1–0	TRA United
November	69	(Tanzania) Abdulmalik Zakaria (2)	Mashujaa	0–0	Dodoma Jiji
November	66	(Tanzania) Mathew Tigisi	Pamba Jiji	3–0	KMC
November	67	(Tanzania) Ismail Mhesa	Mtibwa Sugar	2–1	TRA United
November	65	(Democratic Republic of the Congo) Fabrice Ngoy (2)	Namungo	1–0	Mbeya City
November	68	(Tanzania) Paul Peter (3)	JKT Tanzania	2–0	Fountain Gate
December	76	(Tanzania) Ally Msangi	Coastal Union	0–0	Mashujaa
December	73	(Tanzania) Costantine Malimi	Mtibwa Sugar	0–0	JKT Tanzania
December	8	(Nigeria) Amas Obasogie	Singida Black Stars	0–0	Azam
December	95	(Kenya) Duke Abuya	Young Africans	2–0	Fountain Gate
December	93	(Tanzania) Morice Abraham	Simba	3–0	Mbeya City
December	75	(Tanzania) Mussa Mbisa	Prisons	0–0	Pamba
December	32	(Tanzania) Shabani Chilunda	TRA United	3–1	Singida Black Star
December	31	(Tanzania) Nassor Saadun	Azam	2–0	Simba
December	46	(Tanzania) Prince Dube	Young Africans	1–0	Coastal Union
January	96	(Tanzania) Salmin Hoza	Dodoma Jiji	1–1	Singida Black Star
January	112	(Tanzania) Feisal Salum	Azam	3–0	Coastal Union
January	102	(Tanzania) Haroun Evody (2)	Mtibwa Sugar	1–1	Simba
January	87	(Tanzania) Mudathir Yahya	Young Africans	6–0	Mashujaa
January	88	(Tanzania) Habeeb Mussa	fountain Gate	0–0	Azam
January	86	(Tanzania) Salehe Karabaka (2)	JKT Tanzania	1–0	Singida Black Stars
January	81	(Tanzania) Said Mkopi	Mtibwa Sugar	2–1	Mbeya City
January	82	(Tanzania) Iddi Kipagwile (2)	Dodoma Jiji	1–0	Prisons
January	83	(Tanzania) Joel Noel	TRA United	3–0	KMC
January	84	(Tanzania) Abdallah Mfuko	Namungo	1–0	Coastal Union
January	87	(Tanzania) James Mwashinga	Mtibwa Sugar	0–1	Pamba Jiji
January	61	(Angola) Depú	Young Africans	3–1	Dodoma Jiji
January	63	(Senegal) Libasse Gueye	Simba	2–0	Mashujaa
January	48	(Tanzania) Aishi Manula	Azam	2–0	TRA United
January	99	(Tanzania) Kelvin Nashon (3)	Pamba Jiji	1–1	Mbeya City
January	97	(Tanzania) William Edger	Dodoma Jiji	1–0	JKT Tanzania
January	101	(Democratic Republic of the Congo) Fabrice Ngoy (3)	Namungo	1–0	KMC

==== Monthly awards ====
As of 8 April 2026

Month	Coach of the Month		Player of the Month		Manager of the Month	
Month	Coach	Club	Player	Club	Manager	Stadium
September	(Tanzania) Ahmad Ally	JKT Tanzania	(Mali) Djigui Diarra	Young Africans	not announced	
October	(Tanzania) Mohamed Laizer	Fountain Gate	(Tanzania) Issa Abushir	Fountain Gate	(Tanzania) Jackson Mwendwa	Tanzanite Kwara
November	(Tanzania) Juma Mgunda	Namungo	(Democratic Republic of the Congo) Fabrice Ngoy	Namungo	(Tanzania) Said Mpuche	Major General Isamuhyo Stadium
December	(Portugal) Pedro Gonçalves	Young Africans	(Kenya) Duke Abuya	Young Africans	(Tanzania) Said Mpuche (2)	Major General Isamuhyo Stadium
January	(Portugal) Pedro Gonçalves (2)	Young Africans	(Tanzania) William Edger	Dodoma Jiji FC	(Tanzania) Hussein Muhondo	Jamhuri Stadium (Dodoma)
February	(South Africa) Steve Barker	Simba	(Angola) Depú	Young Africans	(Tanzania) Said Mpuche (3)	Major General Isamuhyo Stadium
March	(South Africa) Steve Barker (2)	Simba	(Ghana) Ibrahim Imoro	Singida Black Stars	(Tanzania) Omar Malule	Airtel Stadium
April	(Portugal) Pedro Gonçalves (3)	Young Africans	(Uganda) Allan Okello	Young Africans	not announced	
May	(South Africa) Steve Barker (3)	Simba	(Uganda) Allan Okello (2)	Young Africans	(Tanzania) Omar Malule (2)	Airtel Stadium
