= 2025–26 Tanzanian First League =

Football league season

Tanzanian First League
- Season: 2025–26
- Dates: 29 November 2025 – 25 April 2026
- Champions: Bandari (Group A); Rhino Rangers (Group B)
- Promoted: Bandari; IAA; Rhino Rangers
- Relegated: Biashara United; Green Warriors; Mapinduzi; Pan African
- Top goalscorer: Mohamed Vuai; George Komba (6 goals each)
- Biggest home win: Rhino Rangers 3–1 Endument (29 November 2025)
- Biggest away win: Dar City 2–5 Magnet (30 November 2025)
- Highest scoring: Dar City 2–5 Magnet (30 November 2025)
- All statistics correct as of 8 December 2025.

The 2025–26 Tanzania First League season was the professional league for association football clubs in the Tanzanian football league system, since its establishment in 1948. Fixtures for the 2025–26 season were announced on 8 August 2025.

== Format ==
The league consists of 16 teams and divided into two groups. Each group has 8 teams, the top teams qualify directly for the Championship League.

== Teams ==
=== Changes from previous season ===
==== Promotion and relegation ====
▲ Promoted to the 2025–26 Championship League	▼ Relegated from the 2024–25 Championship League	▲ Promoted from the Regional Champions League	▼ Relegated to the Regional Champions League
Gunners; Hausung; Tanesco	Biashara United; Cosmopolitan; Green Warriors	Bandari; Misitu; IAA	Ruvu Shooting; African Lyon; Tunduru Korosho

==== Name changes ====
- Before the start of the season, TRA Kilimanjaro renamed their club to Endument, and Misitu renamed their club to NKIM as part of rebrands.

=== Locations and Stadiums ===
Location of clubs in Tanzania for the 2025–26 Tanzanian First League season

Team	Location	Stadium	Capacity
NKIM	Tanga	Mkwakwani Stadium	15,000
Green Warriors	Pwani (Mlandizi)	Mabatini Stadium	10,000
Magnet	Pwani (Mlandizi)	Mabatini Stadium	10,000
Nyumbu	Pwani (Mlandizi)	Mabatini Stadium	10,000
Pan Africans	Pwani (Mlandizi)	Mabatini Stadium	10,000
Dar City	Morogoro	Manungu Stadium	7,000
Cosmopolitan	Morogoro	Jamhuri Stadium Morogoro	20,000
Moro Kids	Morogoro	Jamhuri Stadium Morogoro	20,000
IAA	Arusha	Sheikh Amri Abeid Memorial Stadium	20,000
Bandari	Mtwara	Nangwanda Sijaona Stadium	10,000
Rhino Rangers	Tabora	Tabora Boys Stadium	10,000
Endument	Moshi (Kilimanjaro)	Karume Stadium	10,000
Alliance	Mwanza	Nyamagana Stadium	20,000
Copco	Mwanza	Nyamagana Stadium	20,000
Mapinduzi	Mwanza	Nyamagana Stadium	20,000
Biashara United	Mara Region	Karume Stadium	10,000

== League table ==
=== Group A ===
Pos	Team	Pld	W	D	L	GF	GA	GD	Pts	Promotion, qualification or relegation
1	Bandari (C, P)	14	10	2	2	25	9	+16	32	Promotion to the Tanzanian Championship League
2	Nyumbu	14	8	5	1	18	11	+7	29	Qualification for the Tanzanian Championship League play-off
3	Cosmopolitan	14	7	1	6	21	11	+10	22	Qualification for the Tanzanian Championship League play-off
4	Moro Kids	14	5	3	6	15	13	+2	18	
5	Dar City	14	5	2	7	16	28	−12	17	
6	Magnet (O)	14	4	4	6	25	19	+6	16	Qualification for the Tanzanian First League play-off
7	Pan African (R)	14	3	3	8	13	26	−13	12	Qualification for the Tanzanian First League play-off
8	Green Warriors (R)	14	3	2	9	13	29	−16	11	Relegation to the Regional Champions League

Source: League Board
Rules for classification: 1) points; 2) head-to-head points; 3) head-to-head goal difference; 4) head-to-head goals scored; 5) goal difference; 6) goals scored
(C) Champions; (O) Play-off winners; (P) Promoted; (R) Relegated

=== Group B ===
Pos	Team	Pld	W	D	L	GF	GA	GD	Pts	Promotion, qualification or relegation
1	Rhino Rangers (C, P)	14	11	2	1	31	9	+22	35	Promotion to the Tanzanian Championship League
2	IAA (O, P)	14	9	3	2	28	13	+15	30	Qualification for the Tanzanian Championship League play-off
3	Endument	14	7	3	4	23	15	+8	24	Qualification for the Tanzanian Championship League play-off
4	NKIM	14	6	3	5	23	18	+5	21	
5	Alliance	14	4	4	6	11	14	−3	16	
6	Copco (O)	14	4	2	8	16	20	−4	14	Qualification for the Tanzanian First League play-off
7	Mapinduzi (R)	14	4	2	8	7	24	−17	14	Qualification for the Tanzanian First League play-off
8	Biashara United (R)	14	0	3	11	5	31	−26	−3 (Note: Biashara United were deducted six points for repeated postponements.)	Relegation to the Regional Champions League

Source: League Board
Rules for classification: 1) points; 2) head-to-head points; 3) head-to-head goal difference; 4) head-to-head goals scored; 5) goal difference; 6) goals scored
(C) Champions; (O) Play-off winners; (P) Promoted; (R) Relegated

== Results ==
Each team plays each other twice (14 matches each), once at home and once away.

=== Group A ===
Home \ Away	BAN	COM	DAR	GRN	MAG	MOR	MBU	PAN
Bandari	—	2–0			2–1		1–0	1–1
Cosmopolitan		—	4–0				0–0	0–1
Dar City	0–4		—	0–2	2–5	1–2		
Green Warriors	0–0	0–4		—			1–1	
Magnet		0–3		4–0	—	1–1		
Moro Kids	1–2	0–1		3–0 (Note: Moro Kids awarded a 3–0 win after match postponed.)		—	1–2	1–1
Nyumbu			1–0		1–1		—	1–0
Pan African			1–1	3–2		0–3 (Note: Moro Kids awarded a 0–3 win after match postponed.)		—

Updated to match(es) played on 3 February 2026. Source: League Board
Legend: Blue = home team win; Yellow = draw; Red = away team win.

=== Group B ===
Home \ Away	ALL	BUM	COP	END	IAA	MAP	NKI	RIN
Alliance	—	3–0 (Note: Alliance awarded a 3–0 win after match postponed.)	1–0			1–1		2–0
Biashara United		—			1–1		0–0	0–3
Copco		3–0 (Note: Copco awarded a 3–0 win after match postponed.)	—		3–3		1–1	1–3
Endument	1–0	3–0 (Note: Endument awarded a 3–0 win after match postponed.)	3–1	—				
IAA	2–0			3–1	—	1–0		
Mapinduzi		2–1	1–0	0–3		—	1–0	
NKIM	2–0			2–3	1–2		—	
Rhino Rangers				3–1	2–0	4–0	3–2	—

Updated to match(es) played on 1 February 2026. Source: League Board
Legend: Blue = home team win; Yellow = draw; Red = away team win.

=== Results by round ===
==== Group A ====
Team ╲ Round	1
Bandari	D
Cosmopolitan	D
Dar City	L
Green Warriors	
Magnet	W
Moro Kids	
Nyumbu	D
Pan African	D

Updated to match(es) played on 15 November 2025. Source: League Board
W = Win; D = Draw; L = Loss

==== Group B ====
Team ╲ Round	1
Alliance	D
Biashara United	
Copco	
Endument	L
IAA	W
Mapinduzi	D
NKIM	L
Rhino Rangers	W

Updated to match(es) played on 15 November 2025. Source: League Board
W = Win; D = Draw; L = Loss

== Tanzanian First League play-off ==
The 6th-placed teams (Copco and Magnet) faced the 7th-placed teams from the opposite group (Pan African and Mapinduzi) over two legs; the losers then each faced the 3rd and 4th-placed teams from the 2026–27 Tanzanian Regional Champions League (Mount Hanang and Stand Masasi) for the final two places in the 2026–27 Tanzanian First League.

=== Semi-finals ===
==== First legs ====
19 June 2026	Mapinduzi (7th, First League Group B)	0–0	Magnet (6th, First League Group A)

19 June 2026	Pan African (7th, First League Group A)	1–1	Copco (6th, First League Group B)

==== Second legs ====
24 June 2026	Magnet (6th, First League Group A)	w/o	Mapinduzi (7th, First League Group B)

24 June 2026	Copco (6th, First League Group B)	2–1 (3–2 agg.)	Pan African (7th, First League Group A)

=== Finals ===
==== First legs ====
29 June 2026	Mount Hanang (3rd, Champions League)	7–1	Mapinduzi (7th, First League Group B)

29 June 2026	Stand Masasi (4th, Champions League)	1–0	Pan African (7th, First League Group A)

==== Second legs ====
3 July 2026	Mapinduzi (7th, First League Group B)	4–1 (5–8 agg.)	Mount Hanang (3rd, Champions League)

3 July 2026	Pan African (7th, First League Group A)	1–2 (1–3 agg.)	Stand Masasi (4th, Champions League)

== Season statistics ==
=== Top scorers ===
As of 19 January 2026

Rank	Player	Club	Goals
1	(Tanzania) Mohamed Vuai	Cosmopolitan	6
2	(Tanzania) George Komba	Rhino Rangers	6
3	(Tanzania) Iddi Shaban	Rhino Rangers	5
4	(Tanzania) Joseph Ombeni	IAA	4
5	(Tanzania) John Emmanuel	Magnet	4
6	(Tanzania) Ally Hamisi	Nkim	4
7	(Tanzania) Nelson Richard	Nyumbu	4
8	(Tanzania) Danford Mosses	Bandari	4

== See also ==
- Premier League
- Championship League
- FA Cup
