= 2025–26 Tanzanian Championship League =

Tanzanian Championship League
- Season: 2025–26
- Dates: 10 October 2025 – 23 May 2026
- Champions: Geita Gold
- Promoted: Geita Gold; Kagera Sugar; Polisi Tanzania
- Relegated: African Sports; Barberian; Hausung
- Matches: 40
- Goals: 107 (2.68 per match)
- Top goalscorer: Obrey Chirwa (14 goals)
- Biggest home win: Mbuni 4–0 Mbeya Kwanza (10 October 2025); Polisi Tanzania 4–0 B19 (12 October 2025); Kagera Sugar 4–1 African Sports (10 November 2025); Kagera Sugar 4–1 Stand United (15 November 2025); Songea United 4–2 B19 (15 November 2025)
- Biggest away win: Hausung 1–3 Mbuni (26 October 2025); Transit Camp 2–3 Mbeya Kwanza (8 November 2025)
- Highest scoring: Songea United 4–2 B19 (15 November 2025)
- Longest winning run: 9 matches Kagera Sugar
- Longest unbeaten run: 18 matches Geita Gold
- Longest winless run: 13 matches Barberian
- Longest losing run: 6 matches Barberian
- All statistics correct as of 19 March 2026.

Tanzanian Championship League (known as the NBC Championship League for sponsorship reasons) was the second-highest football league in Tanzania (mainland only). The season started on 10 October 2025 and ended on 23 May 2026.

== Teams ==
The league consisted of sixteen teams – eleven teams remaining from the previous season, three teams promoted from the Tanzanian First League, and two teams relegated from the Tanzanian Premier League.

The promoted teams were the 2024–25 Tanzanian First League champions Gunners, runners-up Hausung, and play-off winners B19. They replaced the play-off losers Green Warriors, and Tanzanian Championship League bottom two teams Biashara United and Cosmopolitan.

The relegated teams were the 2024–25 Tanzanian Premier League bottom two teams Kagera Sugar and KenGold. They replaced the 2024–25 Tanzanian Championship League champions Mtibwa Sugar and runners-up Mbeya City.

=== Name changes ===
- Before the start of the season, Kiluvya renamed to Barberian and Tanesco to B19, both as part of rebranding.

=== Changes from previous season ===
==== Promotion and relegation ====
▲ Promoted to the 2025–26 Premier League	▼ Relegated From the 2024 –25 Premier League	▲ Promoted From 2024–25 First League	▼ Relegated to 2025–26 First League
Mtibwa Sugar; Mbeya City	Kagera Sugar; KenGold	Gunners; Hausung; B19	Biashara United; Cosmopolitan; Green Warriors

=== Locations and stadiums ===
Location of clubs in Tanzania for the 2025–26 Tanzanian Championship League season

Note: Table lists in alphabetical order.

Team	Location	Stadium	Capacity
African Sports	Tanga	Mkwakwani Stadium	15,000
B19	Morogoro	Jamhuri Stadium Morogoro	20,000
Barberian	Pwani (Mlandizi)	Mabatini Stadium	10,000
Bigman	Tanga (Korogwe)	Mkwakwani Stadium	15,000
Geita Gold	Geita	Nyankumbu Stadium	20,000
Gunners	Dodoma	Jamhuri Dodoma	30,000
Hausung	Njombe		10,000
Kagera Sugar	Kagera (Bukoba)	Kaitaba Stadium	7,000
KenGold	Mbeya	Sokoine Stadium	20,000
Mbeya Kwanza	Mbeya (Iyunga)	Nangwanda Sijaona Stadium	10,000
Mbuni	Arusha	Sheikh Amri Abeid Memorial Stadium	20,000
Polisi Tanzania	Moshi (Kilimanjaro)	Ushirika Stadium	20,000
Songea United	Ruvuma (Songea)	Majimaji Stadium	20,000
Stand United	Shinyanga	Kambarage Stadium	10,000
TMA Stars	Arusha	Sheikh Amri Abeid Memorial Stadium	20,000
Transit Camp	Pwani (Mlandizi)	Mabatini Stadium	10,000

== League table ==
Pos	Team	Pld	W	D	L	GF	GA	GD	Pts	Promotion, qualification or relegation
1	Geita Gold (C, P)	30	24	5	1	68	17	+51	77	Promotion to the Tanzanian Premier League
2	Kagera Sugar (P)	30	22	6	2	53	12	+41	72	Promotion to the Tanzanian Premier League
3	Polisi Tanzania (O, P)	30	20	6	4	50	21	+29	66	Qualification for the Tanzanian Premier League play-off
4	Mbeya Kwanza	30	19	4	7	52	25	+27	61	Qualification for the Tanzanian Premier League play-off
5	Transit Camp	30	17	5	8	43	34	+9	56	
6	Mbuni	30	15	2	13	42	34	+8	47	
7	KenGold	30	11	6	13	35	42	−7	39	
8	Gunners	30	11	5	14	32	42	−10	38	
9	B19	30	10	7	13	29	43	−14	37	
10	TMA Stars	30	10	6	14	28	31	−3	36	
11	Bigman (O)	30	9	9	12	30	31	−1	36	Qualification for the Tanzanian Championship League play-off
12	Songea United (O)	30	8	8	14	28	39	−11	32	Qualification for the Tanzanian Championship League play-off
13	Stand United (O)	30	8	4	18	25	45	−20	25	Qualification for the Tanzanian Championship League play-off
14	African Sports (R)	30	6	3	21	27	55	−28	21	Qualification for the Tanzanian Championship League play-off
15	Barberian (R)	30	3	9	18	18	43	−25	18	Relegation to the Tanzanian Second Division League
16	Hausung (R)	30	3	3	24	16	62	−46	12	Relegation to the Tanzanian Second Division League

Source: League Board, Sofascore, Sports Archives
Rules for classification: 1) Points; 2) Goal difference; 3) Goals scored; 4) Head-to-head points; 5) Head-to-head goal difference; 6) Head-to-head goals scored; 7) Play-off
(C) Champions; (O) Play-off winners; (P) Promoted; (R) Relegated

== Results ==
Each team plays each other twice (30 matches each), once at home and once away.

Home \ Away	AFC	B19	BAR	BGM	GGF	GUN	HAU	KAG	KEN	MBK	MBN	PLS	SNG	STU	TMA	TRS
African Sports	—	1–0			0–1	1–0	1–0	0–3		1–2	0–2				1–2	0–2
B19	4–1	—	0–0	1–1		1–0	2–1	0–1	2–1			1–1		0–0	0–1	
Barberian	1–1		—	0–1	0–1		1–2	1–1	1–2		0–3	0–0	1–1		2–1	
Bigman	0–0		2–1	—	1–1			0–1	2–0	0–1	3–1		2–0	2–1	0–0	
Geita Gold		3–0	3–0		—	3–0		1–1	2–2	2–0		2–0		1–0		1–1
Gunners	3–2	2–1	2–2	1–1		—		0–3	2–1	0–3			1–0		1–1	0–1
Hausung	2–1			0–1	0–3	0–1	—			1–3	1–3	1–2	0–0	3–0 (Note: Hausung awarded a 3–0 win after Stand United forfeited match.)	0–0	
Kagera Sugar	4–1		2–1	2–0			3–1	—				2–0	2–2	4–0	1–0	0–0
KenGold	2–1		2–0			0–0	3–1	0–1	—		0–0			1–0	1–1	
Mbeya Kwanza		5–0	4–0		1–2			2–1	2–1	—	2–0	4–2	2–0		1–0	1–1
Mbuni		2–0		2–0	0–1	1–0	1–0	0–2		4–0	—		1–2			3–0
Polisi Tanzania	3–0	4–0		1–1	2–0	4–0	2–0				2–1	—		2–0		1–1
Songea United	2–0	4–2			0–2	1–1			2–1		1–1	0–0	—	2–1		1–3
Stand United	2–1		1–0			1–0	4–0		0–2	1–1	2–1	1–2	1–0	—	1–0	
TMA Stars		1–1		1–0	1–2				2–1	1–0	0–1	1–2	0–0		—	0–1
Transit Camp		3–2	2–0	1–0	0–1		2–1	1–2	1–0	2–3			3–1	1–0		—

Updated to match(es) played on 23 February 2026. Source: Championship League, Soccerway
Legend: Blue = home team win; Yellow = draw; Red = away team win.

=== Results by round ===
Team ╲ Round	1	2	3	4	5
African Sports	W	W	L	L	L
B19 FC	L	L	L	L	L
Barberian	L	L	L	L	L
Bigman	L	L	L	W	D
Geita Gold	W	D	W	W	W
Gunners	D	D	W	W	L
Hausung	L	L	L	W	L
Kagera Sugar	D	W	W	W	W
KenGold	D	W	W	D	W
Mbeya Kwanza	L	L	L	W	W
Mbuni	W	W	W	L	W
Polisi Tanzania	W	W	W	L	D
Songea United	W	D	L	W	W
Stand United	L	L	L	L	L
TMA Stars	W	W	W	D	L
Transit Camp	D	D	W	L	W

Updated to match(es) played on 17 October 2025. Source: Championship League
W = Win; D = Draw; L = Loss

== Tanzanian Championship League play-off ==
The 11th-14th placed teams (Bigman, Songea United, Stand United, and African Sports) qualified for the Tanzanian Championship League play-off (held over two legs), alongside the 2nd (Nyumbu and IAA) and 3rd (Cosmopolitan and Endument) placed teams from the 2025–26 Tanzanian First League. The First League teams qualified for the quarter-finals, and the Championship teams qualified for the semi-finals; the quarter-final winners then each face one of the semi-final losers for the final two places in the 2026–27 Tanzanian Championship League.

=== Quarter-finals ===
==== First legs ====
19 June 2026	Cosmopolitan (3rd, First League Group A)	0–2	IAA (2nd, First League Group B)

19 June 2026	Endument (3rd, First League Group B)	1–0	Nyumbu (2nd, First League Group A)

==== Second legs ====
27 June 2026	IAA (2nd, First League Group B)	1–0 (3–0 agg.)	Cosmopolitan (3rd, First League Group A)

27 June 2026	Nyumbu (2nd, First League Group A)	2–0 (2–1 agg.)	Endument (3rd, First League Group B)

=== Semi-finals ===
==== First legs ====
27 June 2026	African Sports (14th, Championship League)	1–0	Bigman (11th, Championship League)
14:00

27 June 2026	Stand United (13th, Championship League)	1–1	Songea United (12th, Championship League)
14:00

==== Second legs ====
1 July 2026	Bigman (11th, Championship League)	1–0 (1–1 agg.) (5–4 p)	African Sports (14th, Championship League)
14:00

1 July 2026	Songea United (12th, Championship League)	1–0 (2–1 agg.)	Stand United (13th, Championship League)
14:00

=== Finals ===
==== First legs ====
7 July 2026	IAA (2nd, First League Group B)	2–1	African Sports (14th, Championship League)
14:00

7 July 2026	Nyumbu (2nd, First League Group A)	0–0	Stand United (13th, Championship League)
14:00

==== Second legs ====
11 July 2026	African Sports (14th, Championship League)	1–1 (2–3 agg.)	IAA (2nd, First League Group B)

11 July 2026	Stand United (13th, Championship League)	1–0 (1–0 agg.)	Nyumbu (2nd, First League Group A)

== Season statistics ==
=== Top scorers ===
As of 19 March 2026

Rank	Player	Club	Goals
1	(Zambia) Obrey Chirwa	Kagera Sugar	14
2	(Tanzania) Adam Uledi	Transit Camp	11
3	(Tanzania) Ramadhan Kalanje	B19	11
4	(Tanzania) Boniface Mwanjonde	Mbeya Kwanza	10
5	(Tanzania) Abdereheman Musa	Gunners	9
6	(Tanzania) Samson Alberty	KenGold	9
7	(Tanzania) Maulid Shaban	Geita Gold	9
8	(Tanzania) Seif Adam	Mbeya Kwanza	8
9	(Tanzania) Joseph Ambukege	Mbeya Kwanza	8
10	(Tanzania) Emmanuely Mpuka	Polisi Tanzania	8
11	(Tanzania) Raymond Lulendi	Songea United	7
12	(Tanzania) Hassan Mwaterema	Kagera Sugar	7

=== Clean sheets ===
As of 19 March 2026

Rank	Player	Club	Clean sheets
1	(Tanzania) Paul Kamtewe	Mbuni	10
2	(Tanzania) Aron Kalambo	Transit Camp	9
3	(Tanzania) Said Kipao	Kagera Sugar	9
4	(Tanzania) Nicodemasi Mpupua	Mbeya Kwanza	8
5	(Tanzania) Deogratius Munish	Geita Gold	7
6	(Tanzania) Haroun Mandanda	Polisi Tanzania	7
7	(Tanzania) Frank Faustine	Ken Gold	6
8	(Tanzania) Said Kulwa	TMA	5
9	(Tanzania) Lucas Chambeja	Stand United	5
10	(Burkina Faso) Nourdine Balora	Bigman	4

== Awards ==
As of 16 March 2026

=== Monthly awards ===
Month	Coach of the Month		Player of the Month	
Month	Coach	Club	Player	Club
October	(Tanzania) leonard Budeba	Mbuni	(Tanzania) Rishedy Kihedu	Mbuni
November	(Tanzania) Zuberi Katwira	Geita Gold	(Tanzania) Deogratius Munishi	Geita Gold
December	(Tanzania) Shadrack Nsajigwa	Transit Camp	(Tanzania) Adam Uled	Transit Camp
January	(Tanzania) Zuberi Katwira (2)	Geita Gold	(Tanzania) Joseph Ambukege	Mbeya Kwanza
February	(Tanzania) Mbwana Makata	Polisi Tanzania	(Tanzania) Ramadhan Karanje	B19
