= 2025 Kagame Interclub Cup =

International football competition in Africa

CECAFA Kagame Cup

Tournament details
- Host country: Tanzania
- Dates: 2–15 September
- Teams: 12 (from 10 associations)
- Venues: 2 (in 1 host city)

Final positions
- Champions: (Tanzania) Singida Black Stars (1st title)
- Runners-up: (Sudan) Al-Hilal
- Third place: (Rwanda) APR FC
- Fourth place: (Tanzania) KMC

Tournament statistics
- Matches played: 22
- Goals scored: 48 (2.18 per match)
- Top scorer: Clatous Chama
- Best player: Memel Raouf Dao
- All statistics correct as of Complete.

The 2025 CECAFA Kagame Interclub Cup was the 47th edition of the Kagame Interclub Cup, a football competition for clubs in East and Central Africa, which is organized by CECAFA. The competition was held in Tanzania from 2 to 15 September.

== Format ==
Twelve teams from 10 associations are placed in three groups of four teams each. The top teams in each group and the best runners up will automatically qualify for the semi-final stage.

== Participating clubs ==
The following twelve teams will contest in the tournament.

- (Sudan) Al-Hilal
- (South Sudan) Kator FC
- (Sudan) Al Ahli SC
- (Rwanda) APR FC
- (Djibouti) Garde Cotes FC
- (Tanzania) KMC
- (Somalia) Mogadishu City Club
- Kenya Police
- (Zanzibar) Mlandege
- (Burundi) Bumamuru FC
- (Tanzania) Singida Black Stars FC
- (Ethiopia) Ethiopian Coffee SC

== Venues ==
The following two venues will host the matches of the tournament.

Dar es Salaam	Dar es Salaam is located in Tanzania	Dar es Salaam
Major General Isamuhyo Stadium	Dar es Salaam is located in Tanzania	KMC Complex
Capacity: 20,000	Dar es Salaam is located in Tanzania	Capacity: 7,000

== Draw ==
The draw ceremony of the tournament were held on 28 September at Dar es Salaam. The twelve teams were divided into three groups.

== Group stage ==
Tie-breaking criteria for group play
The ranking of teams in each group was based on the following criteria:
1. Number of points obtained in games between the teams involved
2. Goal difference in games between the teams involved
3. Goals scored in games between the teams involved
4. Away goals scored in games between the teams involved
5. Goal difference in all games
6. Goals scored in all games
7. Drawing of lots

Key to colour in group tables
The top finisher in each group will qualify for the Knockout-stage

=== Group A ===
Pos	Team	Pld	W	D	L	GF	GA	GD	Pts	Qualification
1	(Tanzania) Singida Black Stars FC	3	2	1	0	3	1	+2	7	Advanced to Knockout stage
2	Kenya Police	3	2	0	1	7	2	+5	6	
3	(Ethiopia) Ethiopian Coffee SC	3	1	1	1	6	2	+4	4	
4	(Djibouti) Garde Cotes FC	3	0	0	3	0	11	−11	0	

Source: Sofascore
2 September 2025
13:00 UTC+3

Garde Cotes FC (Djibouti)	0–4	Kenya Police
	Report	E.Zakayo 19'; D.Simiyu 34'; B.Badi 65'; E.Omondi 67'

Major General Isamuhyo Stadium, Dar es Salaam
2 September 2025
16:00 UTC+3

Singida Black Stars (Tanzania)	0–0	(Ethiopia) Ethiopian Coffee SC
	Report

KMC Complex, Dar es Salaam

5 September 2025
13:00 UTC+3

Ethiopian Coffee SC (Ethiopia)	6–0	(Djibouti) Garde Cotes FC
A.Abubakar 12'; A.Zelalem 15', 50'; A.Admassu 37', 45+2', 57'	Report

KMC Complex, Dar es Salaam
5 September 2025
16:00 UTC+3

Kenya Police	1–2	(Tanzania) Singida Black Stars FC
C.Ouma 81'	Report	Elvis Rupia 13'; A. Cerille Koffi 78'

KMC Complex, Dar es Salaam

8 September 2025
13:00 UTC+3

Singida Black Stars FC (Tanzania)	1–0	(Djibouti) Garde Cotes FC
H.Muaku 64'	Report

KMC Complex, Dar es Salaam
8 September 2025
13:00 UTC+3

Ethiopian Coffee SC (Ethiopia)	0–2	Kenya Police
	Report	A.Mangeni 87'; D.Okoth 90'

Major General Isamuhyo Stadium, Dar es Salaam

=== Group B ===
Pos	Team	Pld	W	D	L	GF	GA	GD	Pts	Qualification
1	(Rwanda) APR FC	3	2	1	0	5	1	+4	7	Advanced to Knockout stage
2	(Tanzania) KMC	3	2	1	0	5	3	+2	7	Advanced to Knockout stage
3	(Zanzibar) Mlandege	3	1	0	2	5	5	0	3	
4	(Burundi) Bumamuru FC	3	0	0	3	0	6	−6	0	

Source: Sofascore
3 September 2025
13:00 UTC+3

APR FC (Rwanda)	2–0	(Burundi) Bumamuru FC
D.Ouattara 7'; W.Togui 73'	Report

KMC Complex, Dar es Salaam
3 September 2025
16:00 UTC+3

KMC (Tanzania)	3–2	(Zanzibar) Mlandege
J.Sagwe 19'; R.Chambo 48'; A.Said 87'	Report	A.Ama 89'; A.Hafidh 90'

KMC Complex, Dar es Salaam

6 September 2025
13:00 UTC+3

Bumamuru FC (Burundi)	0–1	(Tanzania) KMC
	Report	E.Mwijage 20'

Major General Isamuhyo Stadium, Dar es Salaam
6 September 2025
16:00 UTC+3

Mlandege (Zanzibar)	0–2	(Rwanda) APR FC
	Report	M.Dao 30'; W.Togui 48'

Major General Isamuhyo Stadium, Dar es Salaam

8 September 2025
16:00 UTC+3

Bumamuru FC (Burundi)	0–3	(Zanzibar) Mlandege
	Report	A.Hafidh 39'; H.Msa 61'; M.Herve(o.g.)

Major General Isamuhyo Stadium, Dar es Salaam
8 September 2025
16:00 UTC+3

APR FC (Rwanda)	1–1	(Tanzania) KMC
C.Niyigena 39'	Report	E.Mwijage 43'

KMC Complex, Dar es Salaam

=== Group C ===
Pos	Team	Pld	W	D	L	GF	GA	GD	Pts	Qualification
1	(Sudan) Al-Hilal	3	1	2	0	5	3	+2	5	Advanced to Knockout stage
2	(Somalia) Mogadishu City Club	3	1	2	0	3	1	+2	5	
3	(Sudan) Al Ahli SC	3	0	2	1	2	3	−1	2	
4	(South Sudan) Kator FC	3	0	2	1	2	3	−1	2	

Source: Sofascore
4 September 2025
13:00 UTC+3

Kator FC (South Sudan)	0–0	(Sudan) Al Ahli SC
	Report

Major General Isamuhyo Stadium, Dar es Salaam
4 September 2025
16:00 UTC+3

Al-Hilal (Sudan)	1–1	(Somalia) Mogadishu City Club
Flomo 24'	Report	M.Khadoh 14' (pen.)

Major General Isamuhyo Stadium, Dar es Salaam

7 September 2025
13:00 UTC+3

Al Ahli SC (Sudan)	1–1	(Sudan) Al-Hilal
Wabdi 67'	Report	Adetunji 47'

KMC Complex, Dar es Salaam
7 September 2025
16:00 UTC+3

Mogadishu City Club (Somalia)	0–0	(South Sudan) Kator FC
	Report

KMC Complex, Dar es Salaam

10 September 2025
15:00 UTC+3

Mogadishu City Club (Somalia)	2–1	(Sudan) Al Ahli SC
I.Khamis 37'; Marsis 90+1'	Report	Khater 16'

Major General Isamuhyo Stadium, Dar es Salaam
10 September 2025
15:00 UTC+3

Al-Hilal (Sudan)	3–1	(South Sudan) Kator FC
Cole 10'; Adetunji 17'; Akire 18'	Report	G.Dicson 12'

KMC Complex, Dar es Salaam

== Knockout stage ==
- In the knockout stage, extra-time and a penalty shoot-out will be used to decide the winner if necessary.

=== Bracket ===
Semi-finals
13 September—Dar es Salaam
(Rwanda) APR FC	1
(Sudan) Al Hilal (a.e.t.)	3
13 September—Dar es Salaam
(Tanzania) Singida Black Stars FC	2
(Tanzania) KMC	0

Final
15 September—Dar es Salaam
(Sudan) Al Hilal	1
(Tanzania) Singida Black Stars FC	2
Third place match
15 September—Dar es Salaam
(Rwanda) APR FC	1
(Tanzania) KMC	0

=== Semi-finals ===
13 September 2025
12:00 UTC+3

APR FC (Rwanda)	1–3 (a.e.t.)	(Sudan) Al-Hilal
W.Togui 30'	Report	Abdel Raouf 83'; Adetunji 91'; M'Bareck 106'

KMC Complex, Dar es Salaam

13 September 2025
16:00 UTC+3

Singida Black Stars FC (Tanzania)	2–0	(Tanzania) KMC
Clatous Chama 45'; A.cerille Koffi 64'	Report

KMC Complex, Dar es Salaam

=== Third place match ===
15 September 2025
12:00 UTC+3

APR FC (Rwanda)	1–0	(Tanzania) KMC
M.Dao 45'	Report

KMC Complex Stadium, Dar es Salaam

=== Final ===
15 September 2025
16:00 UTC+3

Al-Hilal (Sudan)	1–2	(Tanzania) Singida Black Stars
Abdel Raouf 31'	Report	Clatous Chama 19', 58'

KMC Complex Stadium, Dar es Salaam
Referee: Célestin Nsabimana (Rwanda)
