= Jamhuri =

Jamhuri is a Swahili word meaning Republic. It may refer to the following articles:

- Jamhuri Day, a Kenyan national holiday celebrated in December
- Jamhuri News, a Kenyan news curating media serving the Kenyan Diaspora since 2016
- Jamhuri Jazz Band, a band founded in late the 1950s in Tanga, Tanzania
- Jamhuri Stadium (Morogoro), a stadium in Morogoro, Tanzania, home to Moro United football club
- Jamhuri Stadium (Dodoma), a stadium in Dodoma, Tanzania, home to JKT Ruvu Stars and Polisi Dodoma football clubs
- Jamhuri FC, an association football club from Zanzibar based in Pemba Island

Jamhuri may also refer to:

- Kenya, officially called Jamhuri ya Kenya.
- Tanzania, officially Jamhuri ya Muungano wa Tanzania.

== See also ==
- Jumhuriya (disambiguation)
- Jamahiriya
