= Football in Tanzania =

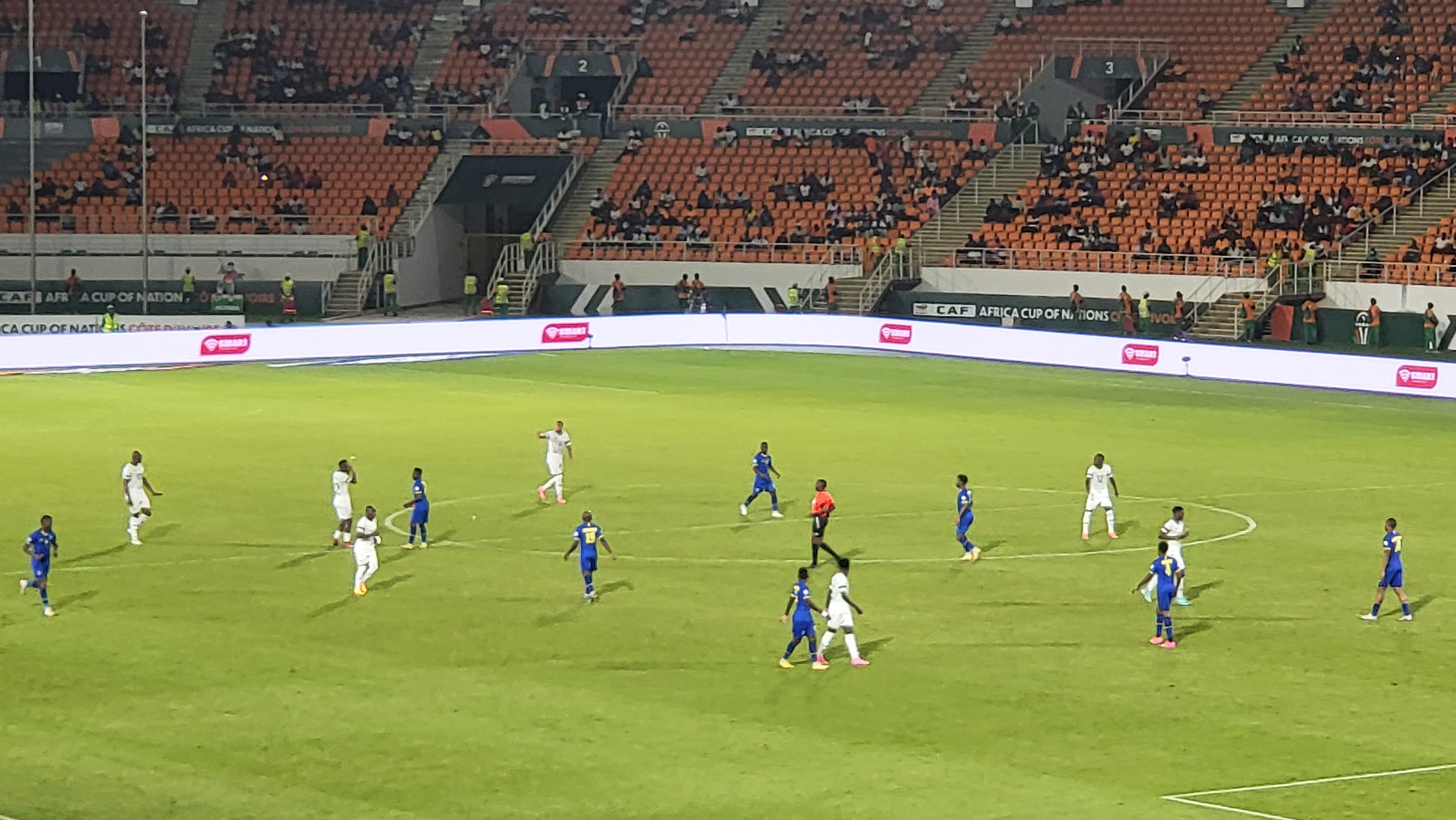
- A football match in Tanzania.
- Country: Tanzania
- Governing body: Tanzania Football Federation
- National teams: Taifa Stars; Twiga Stars

Club competitions
- NBC Premier League; NBC Championship League; First League; CRDB Bank Federation Cup; Mapinduzi Cup; Muungano Cup

International competitions
- Champions League; CAF Confederation Cup; Super Cup; FIFA Club World Cup; FIFA World Cup(National Team); African Cup of Nations(National Team)

The Tanzania Football Federation is the governing body mandated to run the sport of football in Tanzania. It oversees the national football team, Premier League, the Championship, First League, Regional Champions League, Youth U20 League, and the Youth U15 League. It is also in charge of Serengeti Lite Women's Premier League.

Association football is the most popular sport in Tanzania. Approximately 25% of Tanzanians are considered football fans.

== League system ==
The Tanzanian league football pyramid uses a promotion and relegation system. The champions of the nation's top level of football, Tanzanian Premier League (Ligi Kuu Tanzania Bara) qualify to play in the following season's CAF Champions League. The bottom 3 teams are relegated to the Championship.

Level	League	Clubs	Promotion	Relegation
1	Tanzanian Premier League; Ligi Kuu Tanzania	16	NA	relegates 2 teams automatically, 1 goes to relegation playoffs
2	Championship; Ligi Daraja la Kwanza	16	promotes 2 teams automatically, 4 go to promotion playoffs	relegates 2 team automatically, 4 go to relegation playoffs
3	First League; Ligi Daraja la Pili	24 - 4 groups of 6 teams	promotes 3 teams automatically	relegates 3 teams automatically
4	Regional Champions League; Ligi ya Mabingwa wa Mikoa	28 - 4 groups of 7 teams	promotes 3 teams automatically	NA
5	Youth U20 League; Ligi ya Vijana U20			
6	Youth U15 League; Ligi ya Vijana U15			

== Football stadiums in Tanzania ==
Stadiums with a capacity of 30,000 or higher are included.

#	Stadium	Location	Capacity	Home team(s)	Notes
1	National Stadium Tanzania	Dar es Salaam	60,000	National team, Simba SC, Young Africans FC	
2	CCM Kirumba Stadium	Mwanza	35,000	Mbao FC, Alliance Schools FC, Pamba F.C., Toto African	
3	Kambarage Stadium	Shinyanga	30,000	Kahama United	
4	Jamhuri Stadium Dodoma	Dodoma	30,000	JKT Ruvu Stars	
5	Gombani Stadium	Chake-Chake	30,000		
6	Maji-Maji Stadium	Songea	30,000		

== Support ==
Twitter research from 2015 found that the most popular English Premier League club in Tanzania was Manchester United, with 25% of Tanzanian Premier League fans following the club, closely followed by Arsenal (22%) and Chelsea (17%).

== Attendances ==
The average attendance per top-flight football league season and the club with the highest average attendance:

Season	League average	Best club	Best club average
2024-25	2,510	Young Africans	10,176
2023-24	2,408	Young Africans	9,460

Sources: League pages on Wikipedia
