= Mohamed Banka =

Tanzanian footballer

Personal information
- Full name: Mohamed Simba Banka
- Date of birth: 9 November 1996 (age 29)
- Place of birth: Dar-es-Salam, Tanzania
- Height: 1.76 m (5 ft 9 in)
- Position: Midfielder

Senior career*
Years	Team	Apps	(Gls)
- Moro United
- Young Africans
- Simba
–2013	Bandari		
2013–2014	Coastal Union		
2014–2015	Mwadui United		
2015–2017	Friends Rangers		

International career^{‡}
2005–2011	Tanzania	11	(0)
- * Club domestic league appearances and goals as of 1 August 2020 ‡ National team caps and goals as of 1 August 2020

Mohamed Banka (born 24 September 1984) is a retired Tanzanian football midfielder.
