= Jamhuri Stadium =

Jamhuri Stadium may refer to:

- Jamhuri Stadium (Morogoro), a stadium in Morogoro, Tanzania, home to Moro United football club
- Jamhuri Stadium (Dodoma), a stadium in Dodoma, Tanzania, home to JKT Ruvu Stars and Polisi Dodoma football clubs
