= Patrick Bernard Ogwel =

Ugandan Former Footballer

- Citizenship: Ugandan
- Education: Comboni College Lira; National Teachers' College Ngetta; Kampala International University
- Occupations: Sports administrator, former football player and coach
- Known for: General Secretary of the National Council of Sports

Patrick Bernard Ogwel is a Ugandan former football player and sports administrator who serves as the general secretary of the National Council of Sports (NCS).

== Education background ==
Ogwel attended Comboni College Lira for Uganda Advanced Certificate of Education (A-Level) and in 1993 he attended National Teachers' College (NTC) Ngetta where he graduated with Diploma in Education in 1995. In 1999 to 2002, he attended Kampala International University (KIU) where he obtained bachelor's degree in Development Studies.

From 2003 to 2005, Ogwel attended Kampala International University (KIU), where he obtained a master's degree in Development Studies. He later returned to the university in 2006 and was awarded a PhD in 2012.

== Playing and coaching career ==
In 1992, Ogwel played and represented Comboni College in the Copa Coca-Cola national finals while still a student. From 1993 to 1995, he played for Otuke District FC as a striker. During the same period, he also served as Secretary of the Otuke District Football Association.

In 1998, Ogwel joined Pamba FC before moving to Black Rhinos FC. In 2001, he became the head coach of Black Rhino FC, which competed in the Uganda Premier League. He later coached Akol FC during the 2003 Uganda Super League season and coached Comboni College to the Copa Coca-Cola Masindi finals in 2006.

== Sports administration ==
Ogwel began his administrative career while playing football, serving as Secretary of the Otuke District Football Association. He later moved into national sports administration, joining the National Council of Sports in 2017 as Assistant General Secretary. He became Acting General Secretary in 2018 and was confirmed as General Secretary in 2019.
