= Singida Black Stars FC =

Tanzanian football club

Singida Black Stars
- Founded: 2016; 10 years ago
- Ground: Airtel Stadium
- Capacity: 7,000
- Manager: Othmen Najjar
- League: Tanzanian Premier League
- 2025–26: Tanzanian Premier League, 4th of 16
- Website: singidablackstars.co.tz

Singida Black Stars FC is a Tanzanian professional football club based in Mtipa (Singida Region) that currently competes in the Tanzanian Premier League.

== Performance in CAF competitions ==
- CAF Confederation Cup: 1 appearance:

2025–26 – Group Stage

== History ==
Founded as Ihefu SC in 2016, the club bounced between the Championship League and the Premier League during its first few seasons. They were promoted to the top flight for the first time in 2020 and then again after winning the second-tier championship in 2022. In late 2023, the club was purchased by a new owner after it had fallen into a difficult financial situation.

The club rebranded to Singida Black Stars FC in spring 2024. As part of the rebrand, the new club ownership relocated the club from the outskirts of Mbeya to the Singida Region. In 2025, the club advanced to the final of the Tanzania FA Cup. A victory would have been the club's first-ever major trophy. That season, under Kenyan manager David Ouma, the club qualified for a continental competition for the first time. With its fourth place finish in the 2024–25 Tanzanian Premier League, the team qualified for the 2025–26 CAF Confederation Cup.

== Players ==
=== Current squad ===
Note: Flags indicate national team as defined under FIFA eligibility rules; some limited exceptions apply. Players may hold more than one non-FIFA nationality.

No.	Pos.	Nation	Player
1	GK	TAN	Benedict Haule
3	FW	GHA	Jonathan Sowah
4	MF	TAN	Khalid Habibu Iddi
5	DF	GHA	Ibrahim Imoro
6	MF	GHA	Emmanuel Keyekeh
7	MF	TAN	Ayoub Lyanga
8	FW	CIV	Serge Pokou
10	MF	TOG	Marouf Tchakei (vice-captain)
11	MF	TAN	Edmund John
12	GK	NGR	Amas Obasogie
13	DF	CIV	Anthony Tra Bi Tra
14	MF	NGR	Morice Chukwu
15	DF	TAN	Jimson Mwanuke

No.	Pos.	Nation	Player
17	MF	NIG	Victorien Adebayor
18	DF	TAN	Edward Manyama
21	DF	CIV	Ande Koffi
23	DF	GHA	Frank Assinki (vice-captain)
24	MF	TAN	Kelvin Nashon
25	DF	CGO	Hernest Malonga
26	DF	TAN	Kennedy Juma (captain)
28	FW	TAN	Frank Mkumbo
32	MF	GUI	Damaro Camara
38	FW	KEN	Elvis Rupia
40	DF	TAN	Gadiel Kamagi (vice-captain)
60	MF	CIV	Josaphat Arthur Bada

== Stadium ==
Previously, the club's home venue was the Liti Stadium. In March 2025, the club officially opened its new Airtel Stadium. The stadium meets international standards and is expected to host major domestic and international competitions. As part of the opening festivities, the Black Stars played a friendly against Young Africans SC in the first match hosted by the stadium. With the opening of the 7,000-seat venue, Black Stars became the third club in the Premier League to have its own stadium, along with Azam and KMC.

== Honours ==
=== Continental ===
- CECAFA Club Championship
  - Winners (1): 2025 Kagame Interclub Cup
