= Márcio Máximo =

Brazilian football manager (born 1962)

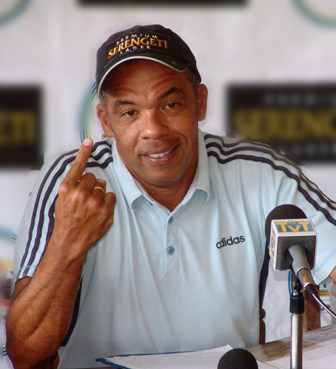
- Máximo in 2016

Personal information
- Full name: Márcio Máximo Barcellos
- Date of birth: 29 April 1962 (age 64)
- Place of birth: Rio de Janeiro, Brazil

Team information
- Current team: KMC

Managerial career
- Years: Team
- 1992–1993: Brazil U20
- 1992–1993: Brazil U17
- 1992: Mesquita
- 1994: Barra da Tijuca FC
- 1994: Qatar U20
- 1995: Al-Ahli
- 1998–2002: Cayman Islands
- 2003: Livingston
- 2006–2010: Tanzania
- 2012: Democrata-GV
- 2013: Francana
- 2014: Young Africans
- 2015: Prudentópolis
- 2017: Costa Rica EC
- 2019–2021: Guyana
- 2025–: KMC

Márcio Máximo Barcellos (born 29 April 1962) is a Brazilian football manager and Head Coach of the Tanzanian Premier League Club KMC

== Career ==
Born in Rio de Janeiro, Máximo was a member of Brazil's under-17 and under-20 sides coach staff from 1992 until 1993. The teams included the future stars like Ronaldo and Ronaldinho. He had been working as technical director to the Cayman Islands for three-years when he rejected the offer of a ten-year extension and instead joined Scottish club Livingston on 5 June 2003. Máximo signed a one-year deal as head coach and became the first Brazilian to manage a British club. However, things did not work out and after nine games (3 wins, 3 draws and 3 defeats) he resigned on 14 October.

On 29 June 2006, Máximo was appointed head coach of the Tanzania national side Maximo helped Tanzania to qualify for CHAN finals for home players. These finals took place in Ivory Coast from 22 February to 8 March 2009. Tanzania qualified after beating Sudan 5–2 goal aggregate.

Máximo extended his contract with the Tanzania Football Federation (TFF) for another year until July 2010, but at that time he was replaced by Danish coach Jan Børge Poulsen.

In December 2011, he was named new manager of Brazilian club Democrata. He was sacked on 13 February 2012. In June 2012 he was rumored as the successor of Kosta Papić as manager of Young Africans S.C., but that job went to Belgian coach Tom Saintfiet. But in November 2012, chose to remain in Brazil, where he will lead the Francana. On 28 June 2014 it was announced that Maximo had signed a two-year contract with Young Africans, one of the top Tanzanian clubs
