= Amas Obasogie =

Nigerian footballer (born 1999)

Personal information
- Full name: Amas Obasogie
- Date of birth: 27 December 1999 (age 26)
- Place of birth: Benin City, Nigeria
- Position: Goalkeeper

Team information
- Current team: Singida Black Stars
- Number: 12

Senior career*
Years	Team	Apps	(Gls)
–2024	Bendel Insurance	33	(0)
2024–2025	Fasil Kenema	11	(0)
2025–	Singida Black Stars	5	(0)

International career^{‡}
2025–	Nigeria	1	(0)
Medal record
Men's football
Representing Nigeria
Africa Cup of Nations
Third place	2025 Morocco
- * Club domestic league appearances and goals as of December 2025 ‡ National team caps and goals as of 20:00, 16 December 2025 (UTC)

Amas Daniel Obasogie (born 27 December 1999) is a Nigerian professional footballer who plays as a goalkeeper for Singida Black Stars in the Tanzanian Premier League and the Nigeria national team.

== Early life ==
Obasogie was born in Benin City, Nigeria.

== Club career ==
Obasogie began his career with Bendel Insurance FC, where he played as a goalkeeper in the Nigeria Professional Football League.

In 2024, he transferred to Fasil Kenema SC in the Ethiopian Premier League.

In 2025, he joined Singida Black Stars FC in Tanzania.

== International career ==
Obasogie has been part of training squads for Nigeria's national team during the 2026 FIFA World Cup qualifiers.

On 11 December 2025, Obasogie was called up to the Nigeria squad for the 2025 Africa Cup of Nations.

== Style of play ==
He is known for his shot-stopping, confidence, and ability to command the penalty box.

== Honours ==
Nigeria

- Africa Cup of Nations third place: 2025
