= Emmanuel Keyekeh =

Tanzanian professional footballer (born 1997)

Personal information
- Full name: Emmanuel Kwame Keyekeh
- Date of birth: 21 December 1997 (age 28)
- Place of birth: Ghana
- Position: Midfielder

Team information
- Current team: Singida Black Stars
- Number: 6

Youth career
- Unistar Academy

Senior career*
Years	Team	Apps	(Gls)
2018–2020	Karela United	35	(0)
2020–2022	Asante Kotoko	24	(1)
2022–2024	FC Samartex 1996	65	(11)
2024–	Singida Black Stars	46	(6)
- * Club domestic league appearances and goals as of 4 September 2026

Emmanuel Kwame Keyekeh (born 21 December 1997) is a Ghanaian professional footballer who plays as a midfielder for Tanzanian club Singida Black Stars.

Keyekeh began his senior career with Karela United before joining Asante Kotoko in 2020, where he was part of the team that won the 2021–22 Ghana Premier League. After leaving Kotoko in 2022, he joined FC Samartex 1996 and later captained the club to its first Ghana Premier League title in the 2023–24 season. Following the championship-winning campaign, he was named the 2024 Ghana Football Awards Home-based Player of the Year. He moved to Tanzania to join Singida Black Stars in July 2024.

== Club career ==
=== Early career and Karela United ===
Keyekeh began his career with Ghanaian lower-division side Unistar Academy, where he spent five years before joining Karela United.

He established himself as a regular in Karela United's midfield and featured prominently during the 2019 Ghana Football Association Normalization Committee Special Competition. Keyekeh helped the club reach the Tier I final, where they finished as runners-up to Asante Kotoko. His performances for Karela also earned him a call-up to the Ghana national under-23 football team in August 2019 ahead of the final qualifying round for the 2019 Africa U-23 Cup of Nations.

During the 2019–20 Ghana Premier League season, Keyekeh made 11 league appearances and was named Man of the Match on three occasions before the competition was suspended and subsequently cancelled due to the COVID-19 pandemic in Ghana. One of those awards came against Asante Kotoko in March 2020, despite Karela losing the match 1–0.

His performances for Karela also earned him a call-up to the Ghana national under-23 football team in August 2019 ahead of the final qualifying round for the 2019 Africa U-23 Cup of Nations.

=== Asante Kotoko ===
On 30 September 2020, Keyekeh joined Asante Kotoko from Karela United ahead of the 2020–21 Ghana Premier League season.

He made his league debut for Kotoko on 15 November 2020 in a 1–1 draw against Eleven Wonders at the Accra Sports Stadium. Keyekeh was named in the starting line-up as Kotoko opened their 2020–21 league campaign.

Keyekeh also featured for Kotoko in the 2020–21 CAF Champions League. On 29 November 2020, he started the first leg of their preliminary-round tie away to Mauritanian champions FC Nouadhibou. He played the first half before being replaced by Sulley Muniru after picking up an injury as Kotoko secured a 1–1 draw. He made two appearances in the competition during Kotoko's continental campaign.

Keyekeh made ten league appearances and scored once during his first season with the club. He remained with Kotoko for the 2021–22 season, making 14 league appearances as the club won the Ghana Premier League title. He left Kotoko in August 2022 following the expiration of his contract, ending a two-season spell with the club.

=== Samartex ===
In August 2022, Keyekeh joined newly promoted FC Samartex 1996 on a free transfer following his departure from Asante Kotoko.

Keyekeh established himself as a regular in Samartex's midfield during the club's debut season in the Ghana Premier League. He made 33 league appearances and scored six goals during the 2022–23 season. In February 2023, he scored twice and was named man of the match in a 3–0 victory over Real Tamale United. He also scored in Samartex's final league match of the season, a 3–2 defeat to Legon Cities, as the club finished its first top-flight campaign in tenth place.

During the 2023–24 season, Keyekeh became captain of Samartex and played a prominent role in the club's title-winning campaign. On 26 February 2024, Keyekeh scored a long-range winning goal in a 2–1 away victory over Aduana Stars, helping Samartex extend their lead at the top of the league table to five points. The strike was subsequently recognised as the Ghana Premier League Goal of the Month.

Keyekeh finished the season with 32 league appearances and five goals as Samartex won the Ghana Premier League title for the first time in the club's history. Samartex finished the campaign with 61 points and qualified for the 2024–25 CAF Champions League. Following his performances during the championship-winning season, Keyekeh was named the Home-based Footballer of the Year at the 2024 Ghana Football Awards.

=== Singida Black Stars ===
In July 2024, Keyekeh moved abroad for the first time in his career, joining Tanzanian Premier League club Singida Black Stars on a three-year contract after leaving Samartex. He made his debut for the club in July in a CECAFA Kagame Interclub Cup match against Rwandan side APR, which Singida lost 1–0.

Keyekeh scored on his Tanzanian Premier League debut on 18 August 2024, opening the scoring with a long-range strike in a 3–1 victory over KenGold. He scored from approximately 30 yards in the 41st minute. He made a strong start to his first season in Tanzania, scoring twice and providing an assist in his opening four league appearances while receiving three player-of-the-match awards.

== Style of play ==
Keyekeh operates as a central midfielder and a defensive midfielder. Due to his role as a box-to-box midfielder he has been compared to Michael Essien and Yaya Toure. Based on his role as a midfielder Keyekeh idolises the African duo along with Kevin De Bruyne, Paul Pogba and Sulley Muntari. He sees them as his role models and draws inspirations and tips from them to improve his game. As a box-to-box midfielder he has the ability to exert energy in supporting both offensive and defensive play. His physicality during a match is shown in his powerful and tough tackling playing style.

== International career ==
In August 2019, Keyekeh received national-team recognition following his performances for Karela United. He was called up to the Ghana national under-23 football team ahead of the final qualifying round for the 2019 Africa U-23 Cup of Nations against Algeria.

Later that month, Keyekeh was named in a 28-man squad for a Ghana Black Stars B training camp ahead of qualification for the 2020 African Nations Championship and the 2019 WAFU Cup of Nations.

== Honours ==
Asante Kotoko

- Ghana Premier League: 2021–22

Samartex

- Ghana Premier League: 2023–24

Individual

- Ghana Football Awards Home-based Player of the Year: 2024
- Ghana Premier League Goal of the Month: February / March 2024
