= Salimu Khamis Aiyee =

Tanzanian footballer

Personal information
- Date of birth: 5 May 1996 (age 30)
- Position: Forward

Team information
- Current team: KMC

Senior career*
Years	Team	Apps	(Gls)
2014–2019	Mwadui United		
2019–	KMC		

International career^{‡}
2019	Tanzania	2	(0)
- * Club domestic league appearances and goals as of 11 August 2021 ‡ National team caps and goals as of 11 August 2021

Salimu Khamis Aiyee (born 5 May 1996) is a Tanzanian football striker who plays for KMC.
