= Jonathan Sowah =

Ghanaian footballer

Personal information
- Date of birth: 9 January 1985 (age 41)
- Position: Forward

Team information
- Current team: Simba
- Number: 9

Senior career*
Years	Team	Apps	(Gls)
2023-24	Medeama SC	?	(?)
2024 - 2025	Al Nasr		
2025 - 2025	Singida Black Stars		
2025 -	Simba		

International career^{‡}
2023–	Ghana	2	(0)
- * Club domestic league appearances and goals as of January 22, 2024 ‡ National team caps and goals as of January 22, 2024

Jonathan Sowah (born 9 January 1985) is a Ghanaian footballer, who plays as a forward for Simba in the Tanzanian Premier League. In late 2025, Sowah was reported to be on trial with League of Ireland Premier Division club Sligo Rovers, as part of their preparations for the 2026 season. He is expected to sign a contract with the club, to begin in 2026. (This deal is pending final agreement.) Jonathan has scored 19 goals in 35 games in his club career so far
