= Moro United F.C. =

- Full name: Moro United Football Club
- Ground: Jamhuri Stadium; Morogoro, Tanzania
- Capacity: 20,000
- League: Tanzanian Premier League
- 2010–11: 3rd, Ligi Daraja la Kwanza
Home colours

Moro United F.C. is a Tanzanian football club based in Morogoro.

They last played in the top level of Tanzanian professional football, the Tanzanian Premier League, during the 2011/12 season.

Their home games are played at Jamhuri Stadium.

== Performance in CAF competitions ==
- CAF Confederation Cup: 1 appearance

2006 – Intermediate Round
