= Mbuni FC =

Mbuni (Mbuni FC)
- Full name: Mbuni F.C. Arusha (Mbuni F.C.)
- Nickname: The Black
- Founded: July 29 (1982)
- Ground: Amri Abeid; Stadium, Arusha
- Capacity: 20,000
- Chairman: Fellician Mashauri
- Manager: Leonard Budeda
- League: Tanzanian Championship League
- 2024–25: Tanzanian Championship League, 9th of 16
- Website: https://ligikuu.co.tz/team/mbuni-fc
Home colours

Mbuni Football Club, also known as Mbuni FC, is a football club based in Arusha, Tanzania. The club currently plays in the Championship.

== History ==
Mbuni Football Club, also known as The Black, is a football club based in Monduli, one of the seven districts of Arusha. It was founded in 1982 as an army team.

== Colours and badge ==
Mbuni FC's colours are red and blue. The Mbuni FC badge has a football, an ostrich and a feather in the letter 'U' of Mbuni and the date of establishment.

== Stadium ==
Mbuni FC play their home matches at Amri Abeid Stadium, Arusha.Mbuni FC homeground a move from the Tanzania People's Defence Force base in Monduli.

== Supporters ==
Apart from Monduli, Mbuni FC draws its fan base from Kaloleni, an administrative ward in the Arusha District of the Arusha Region of Tanzania.

== Squad ==
As of 29 October 2022

Note: Flags indicate national team as defined under FIFA eligibility rules; some limited exceptions apply. Players may hold more than one non-FIFA nationality.

No.	Pos.	Nation	Player
7	FW	TAN	Kelvin Godluck Kipokola
22	FW	TAN	Sadick Said Ramadhani
29	FW	TAN	Aboubakari Hamisi Lugendo
2	FW	TAN	Athanas Enimias Mdah
27	FW	TAN	Lucas Charles Kalango
28	MF	TAN	Abdul Ramadhan
8	MF	TAN	Hijja Shukuru Nunda
14	MF	TAN	Bukaba Paul Bundala
20	MF	TAN	Shabani Seif Hussein
4	MF	TAN	Jonathan Jeremiah Masimba

No.	Pos.	Nation	Player
3	MF	TAN	Michael William Mwingwa
21	DF	TAN	Paschal Robert Mwakapusya
6	DF	TAN	Winston Mjuni Kasimbazi
26	DF	TAN	Masanja Jesto Kamli
10	DF	TAN	Pius Joseph Luchangula
24	DF	TAN	Ayoub Shabani Laizer
23	DF	TAN	Hassan Juma Mganga
16	DF	TAN	Jofrey Joakimu Msemwa
1	GK	TAN	Geophrey Msafiri Mkumbo
18	GK	TAN	Mashauri Dotto Peter

== Honours ==
Winner First League 2021
