= Abdi Banda =

Tanzanian international footballer

Personal information
- Date of birth: 20 May 1995 (age 31)
- Place of birth: Tanga, Tanzania
- Height: 1.85 m (6 ft 1 in)
- Position: Centre back

Team information
- Current team: Richards Bay
- Number: 28

Senior career*
Years	Team	Apps	(Gls)
2012–2014	Coastal Union		
2014–2017	Simba		
2017–2019	Baroka	41	(4)
2019–2020	Highlands Park	9	(0)
2020	TS Galaxy	0	(0)
2021–2022	Mtibwa Sugar		
2022–2023	Chippa United	15	(1)
2023–	Richards Bay	7	(0)

International career^{‡}
2014–	Tanzania	19	(1)
- * Club domestic league appearances and goals as of 1 April 2024 ‡ National team caps and goals as of 1 April 2024

Abdi Banda (born 20 May 1995) is a Tanzanian professional footballer who plays as a defender for South African Premier Division club Richards Bay.

== Club career ==
Born in Tanga, he has played club football for Coastal Union, Simba, Baroka and Highlands Park. After Highlands Park sold their license to TS Galaxy, Banda was transferred in that squad, but was released since he was injured at the time.

In September 2021 he signed for Mtibwa Sugar. In June 2022 he signed for Chippa United.

== International career ==
He made his international debut for Tanzania in 2014.

== Personal life ==
He has a daughter, born October 2019, with his wife Zabibu Kiba, the sister of Ali Kiba. The child was initially reported to be a boy.
