= TRA United =

- Full name: Tanzanian Revenue Authority United Sports Club
- Founded: 2014
- Ground: Ali Hassan Mwinyi Stadium; Tabora, Tanzania
- Capacity: 35,000
- Owner: Tanzania Revenue Authority
- Chairman: Yusuph Kitumbo
- Manager: Kefa Kisala
- League: Tanzanian Premier League
- 2025–26: Tanzanian Premier League, 5th of 16
- Website: www.taboraunited.com
Home colours

Tanzanian Revenue Authority United (formerly Tabora United) is a football club based in Tabora, the capital of Tanzania's Tabora Region. The team plays in the Tanzanian Premier League.

== History ==
Kilimanjaro Talented Youth Sports Centre (Kitayosce) football club was founded in Ruangwa, one of the six districts of Lindi Region, . It was later bought by the current chairman, Yusuf Kitumbo while featuring in the First League. It moved to Tabora Municipal. In 2018–19 season, they finished second in second division under the guidance of assistant coach, Ally John Shangalu and were promoted to the championship for the first time.

In 2023, following their second-place finish in the Tanzanian First Division League, they were promoted to Tanzanian Premier League for the first time.

== Personnel ==
They are coached by Kefa Kisala, a former coach of Masaka LC FC, Express FC, URA FC, BUL FC, Wakiso Giants, UPDF FC and The Cranes assistant coach.

== Colours and badge ==
Kitayosce colours are blue and white at home and green and white away. The Kitayosce FC badge has the acronym emblazoned around an image of Mount Kilimanjaro, sunrays on a football and the full name of the club.

== Stadium ==
Kitayosce play their home matches at the Ali Hassan Mwinyi stadium,Tabora.

== Supporters ==
Tabora United draw their fan base from Tabora district's population of 226,999. They drew an average home attendance of 2,920 in the 2023–24 Tanzanian Premier League.
