= Biashara United F.C =

Football club in Musoma, Tanzania

Biashara United
- Full name: Biashara United Mara
- Nickname: Wanajeshi wa Mpakani
- Founded: 1990; 36 years ago (as Police Mara); 2013; 13 years ago (as Biashara United Mara)
- Ground: Karume Football Stadium, Tanzania
- Capacity: 2,500
- Chairman: Revocatus Rugumila
- Manager: Aman Josiah
- League: Tanzanian Second Division League
- 2024–25: Tanzanian Championship League, 16th of 16 (relegated)
- Website: www.tzchampionship.com/leagues/50540/teams/244152
Home colours	Away colours	Third colours

Biashara United Mara is a football club based at the Karume Football Stadium in Musoma, Tanzania. They play in the Championship.

== History ==
Biashara United Mara was founded in 1990 as Police Mara but was later transformed into a business club and rebranded as Biashara United Mara (BUM) in 2013. The team began playing in the 4th division in 1995 and was promoted to the 1st division in 1997. In 1998, the league underwent restructuring and became the Premier League.

The team was promoted to the 2018/19 Mainland Premier League season, and the 2021 season marked their third before relegation. Some iconic players groomed at this club include Novatus Miroshi, who currently plays for Ukrainian giants Shakhtar Donetsk.

== Squad ==
As of 29 October 2022

Note: Flags indicate national team as defined under FIFA eligibility rules; some limited exceptions apply. Players may hold more than one non-FIFA nationality.

No.	Pos.	Nation	Player
12	GK	TAN	Edson Nyakwesi Magoma
10	DF	TAN	Shabani Suberi Ada
7	DF	TAN	Emanuel Pius Maringira
22	DF	TAN	Amos Makara Kabalele
11	DF	TAN	Mohamedy Nassoro Mohamedy
41	MF	TAN	Emmanuel Wambura Sausi
19	MF	TAN	Isaya Kuzoza Marwa
26	MF	TAN	Kelvin Antony Modest
15	MF	TAN	Shani Olwoch Andrea
30	MF	TAN	Benedictor John Beda

No.	Pos.	Nation	Player
18	GK	TAN	Fedson Elisha Japan
17	DF	TAN	Bihemo Bihemo Mayagane
37	DF	TAN	Abdallah Salum Madirisha
13	DF	TAN	Benson January Masige
2	FW	TAN	Kauswa Benard Manumbu
50	FW	TAN	Faustine Kurwa Lwanda
55	MF	TAN	Vedastus Masinde Makoba
8	MF	TAN	Abdallah Ally Tey
24	MF	TAN	Paineto Yusuph Mugusi
33	MF	TAN	Fredy Juma Sululu
