= Kinondoni Municipal Council F.C. =

Tanzanian association football club based in Dar es Salaam

KMC Football Club
- Full name: Kinondoni Municipal Council Football Club
- Nickname: Kino Boys
- Short name: KMC FC
- Founded: 2014; 12 years ago
- Ground: KMC Complex
- Capacity: 6,000
- Owner: Kinondoni Municipal
- Chairman: Songoro Mnyonge
- Manager: Márcio Máximo
- League: Tanzanian Premier League
- 2025–26: Tanzanian Premier League, 16th of 16

Kinondoni Municipal Council Football Club, commonly known as KMC, is a Tanzanian professional football club based at Kinondoni District in Dar es Salaam. The club competes in Tanzanian Premier League. The club's home games are played at the KMC COMPLEX. It's among of six teams qualified to the Vodacom Premier League in 2018 Tanzanian football, their archrivals being Simba and Yanga. KMC FC drew an average home attendance of 1,033 in the 2023–24 Tanzanian Premier League.

== Players ==
- Salimu Khamis Aiyee (2019–)
