= Aishi Manula =

Tanzanian footballer

Personal information
- Full name: Aishi Manula
- Date of birth: 13 September 1995 (age 31)
- Place of birth: Morogoro, Tanzania
- Height: 1.81 m (5 ft 11 in)
- Position: Goalkeeper

Team information
- Current team: Simba
- Number: 28

Senior career*
Years	Team	Apps	(Gls)
2012–2017	Azam FC		
2017–2025	Simba S.C.		
2025–	Azam FC		

International career^{‡}
2015–	Tanzania	69	(0)
- * Club domestic league appearances and goals ‡ National team caps and goals as of 26 March 2026

Aishi Manula (born 13 September 1995) is a Tanzanian football player for Azam FC. He plays as a goalkeeper and represents the Tanzanian national team.

== Early life ==
Manula was born in Morogoro, Tanzania.

== Club career ==
He began his career at Mtibwa Sugar FC. In 2012 he joined Azam FC at 17 years old. His performance and consistency helped him to join the first eleven replacing the Ghanaian goalkeeper Daniel Agpeyi. He joined Simba S.C. in 2017 and helped the club to win the league four times in succession. After eight years with Simba, Manula returned to Azam in 2025.

== International career ==
Manula's performance for Tanzania in a September 2016 loss against Nigeria in 2017 Africa Cup of Nations qualification Group G was described as "the game of his life" by the Tanzania Daily News. He was one of three goalkeepers included in Tanzania's squad for the 2019 Africa Cup of Nations. When Tanzania next qualified for the final tournament, he was again selected for the 2023 tournament, held in 2024.
