= Bandari F.C. (Tanzania) =

Bandari FC
- Full name: Bandari Football Club
- League: Tanzanian Premier League

Bandari FC is a Tanzanian football club based in Mtwara. They play in the top flight of Tanzanian football. Their home games are played at Umoja Stadium.

== History ==
The club reached the finals of the SportPesa Cup in 2019, after beating the favorites Simba SC 2–1. In the cup final, they faced Kariobangi Sharks and lost 1–0.

== Honours ==
SportPesa Cup:

- Runners-up: 2019
