= Major General Isamuhyo Stadium =

Football stadium in Dar es Salaam , Tanzania

- Interactive map of Major General Isamuhyo Stadium
- Address: Mbweni, Kinondoni
- Location: Dar es Salaam, Tanzania
- Coordinates: 6°34′39.36″S 39°7′28.56″E
- Owner: JKT (National Service Act)
- Capacity: 15,000
- Surface: Grass
- Field size: 110 by 64 metres (120.3 yd × 70.0 yd)

Construction
- Architect: JKT

Tenants
- JKT Tanzania; JKT Queens; Simba(2025-Present)

The Major General Isamuhyo Stadium is a football stadium in Mbweni, Dar es Salaam, Tanzania. It has been the home stadium of JKT Tanzania.
