= JKT Tanzania =

- Full name: JKT Tanzania Football Club
- Nicknames: Wajenga Nchi, Wazalendo
- Founded: 1994; 32 years ago
- Ground: Major General Isamuhyo Stadium; Mbweni,Dar es Salaam, Tanzania
- Capacity: 30,000
- Owner: Jeshi la Kujenga Taifa (JKT)
- Head Coach: Ahmad Ally
- League: Tanzanian Premier League
- 2025–26: Tanzanian Premier League,6th of 16

JKT Tanzania Football Club is a Tanzanian football club based in Mbweni, Dar es Salaam. The club competes in the Premier league. The club plays home games at Major General Isamuhyo Stadium.

== History ==
JKT Tanzania known as National Building Force (Jeshi la Kujenga Taifa), is a football club based in Dar es Salaam, Tanzania, founded in 1994, the team is affiliated with the National Service of Tanzania, which is a branch of the Tanzanian military’s involvement in sports development during the post-independence era of Tanzania.

This team was founded under the name JKT Kabambe at the JKT Mgulani camp in Dar es Salaam,before being transferred to the JKT Ruvu Camp in the Coast region and its name was changed to JKT Ruvu Stars.

In 1999, the team was transferred to the headquarters of the National Building Force (Jeshi la Kujenga Taifa), Mlalakuwa in Dar es Salaam, although it continued to be known as JKT Ruvu Stars until 12 December 2017.

=== TFF Rules and Regulations ===
In 2018 Article no.11 of TFF Constitution on Rules and Regulations, urging the owners of the teams not to have two teams participating in the Tanzania Mainland Premier League. There were many military teams, Lt. Col Hassan Mabena who was Chairman of the JKT Ruvu team make a statement he said "we have received a letter from TFF and have already worked on it, and have called all the leaders of the military clubs to discuss the issue and agree that one team will remain owned by the JKT Army, while the others will return to the citizens".The team renamed JKT Tanzania.

== Players ==
=== Current squad ===
Note: Flags indicate national team as defined under FIFA eligibility rules; some limited exceptions apply. Players may hold more than one non-FIFA nationality.

| No. | Pos. | Nation | Player |
|---|---|---|---|
| 18 | GK | TAN | Yakoub Suleiman |
| 21 | DF | TAN | Wilson Nangu |
| 12 | DF | TAN | David Bryson |
| 29 | DF | TAN | Salum Hamis Gado |
| 8 | MF | TAN | Saidi Ndemla |
| 4 | MF | TAN | Hassan Kapalata |
| 13 | MF | TAN | Najim Maguru |
| 20 | MF | TAN | Edson Kataga (Captain) |
| 7 | MF | TAN | Gamba Matiko |
| 25 | FW | TAN | Shiza Kichuya |
| 31 | MF | TAN | Hassan Nassor |
| 19 | MF | TAN | Ismail Aziz Kader |
| 24 | DF | TAN | Hassan Dilunga |
| 32 | FW | TAN | Mateo Antony Simone |

| No. | Pos. | Nation | Player |
|---|---|---|---|
| 10 | MF | TAN | Edward Songo |
| 2 | DF | TAN | Karimu mfaume |
| 43 | MF | TAN | Abdulrahim Seif Bausi (vice-captain) |
| 11 | MF | TAN | Mohammed Bakar |
| 16 | FW | TAN | Richard Maranya |
| 6 | MF | TAN | Maka Edward |
| 23 | DF | TAN | Issa Dau |
| 35 | MF | TAN | Jaffar Maneno |
| 33 | GK | TAN | Denis Richard |
| 42 | MF | TAN | Ally Msengi |
| 45 | GK | TAN | Joseph Ilunda |
| i4 | FW | TAN | Charles Ilamfia |
| 15 | DF | TAN | Anuar Seleman |

== Achievements ==
- Tanzanian Cup: 1

2002
