= KMC Complex =

Football stadium in Dar es Salaam, Tanzania

- Interactive map of KMC Complex
- Address: Mwenge, Kinondoni
- Location: Dar es Salaam, Tanzania
- Coordinates: 6°46′27.48″S 39°14′0.24″E
- Owner: Kinondoni Municipal Council
- Operator: KMC football club
- Capacity: 6,000
- Surface: Grass
- Field size: 100 by 60 metres (109.4 yd × 65.6 yd)

Construction
- Groundbreaking: 2019
- Built: 2019-2024
- Opened: 2024
- Cost: $4.37 million
- Architect: JKT

Tenants
- KMC(2024–present); Simba(2024–2025); Young Africans(2025–present)

Website
- kinondonimc.go.tz

KMC Complex also known as KMC Complex Mwenge is a football Stadium located in Kinondoni in Dar es Salaam, Tanzania. It is currently used mostly for football matches and is the home stadium of KMC football Club.
