= CCM Kirumba Stadium =

Multi-purpose stadium in Mwanza, Tanzania

- Uwanja wa CCM Kirumba (Swahili)
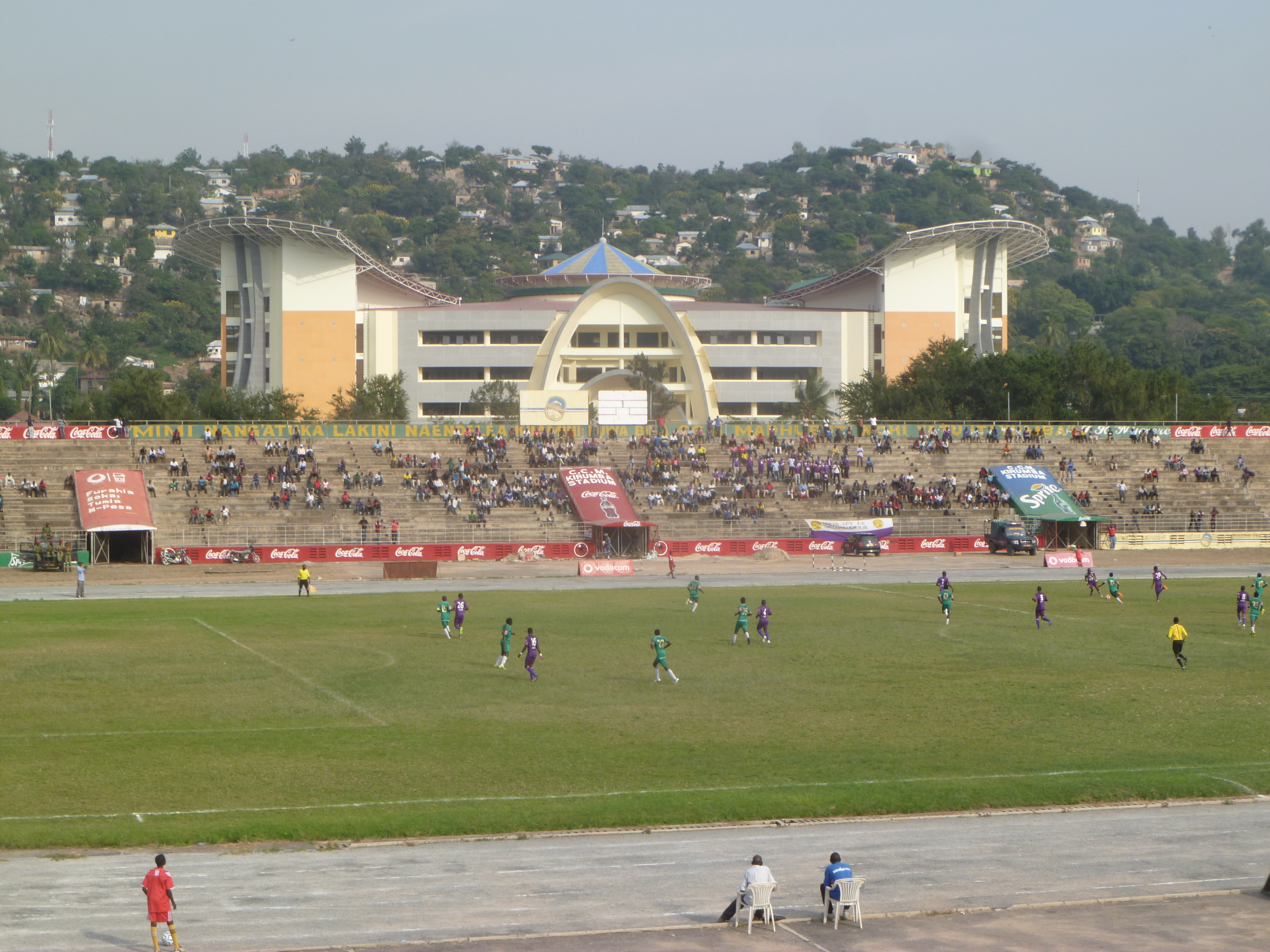
- Interactive map of CCM Kirumba Stadium
- Location: Makongoro Road, Mwanza, Tanzania
- Coordinates: 2.499921°S 32.899490°E
- Elevation: 1144 m
- Owner: Chama Cha Mapinduzi
- Capacity: 35,000
- Type: Multi-purpose stadium
- Surface: grass

Construction
- Built: 1980

Tenants
- Mbao FC, Alliance Schools FC, Pamba F.C. and Toto African

Website
- www.ccm.or.tz

CCM Kirumba Stadium is a multi-purpose stadium in Mwanza, Tanzania. It has a capacity of 35,000 and is the second largest stadium in the country after the National Stadium in Dar es Salaam

== Matches ==
The Tanzania national football team has played many friendlies at this stadium.

The Tanzania national football team played a friendly game in the stadium against Malawi on 29 March 2015. The match resulted in a 1-1 draw.

It has been the home of Mwanza football teams that play in Tanzanian Premier League and in the Tanzanian First Division League.
