= Pamba S.C. =

Association football club in Tanzania

Pamba SC
- Full name: Pamba Sports Club
- Nicknames: Wana Tipilindanda, Wana Kawekamo
- Founded: 1968; 58 years ago
- Ground: CCM Kirumba Stadium; Mwanza, and Nyamaghana Stadium Tanzania
- Capacity: 35,000
- Manager: Goran Kopunovic
- League: Tanzanian Premier League
- 2025–26: Tanzanian Premier League, 7th of 16
- Website: https://www.tzchampionship.com/leagues/50540/teams/244144
Home colours

Pamba Sports Club is a Tanzanian professional football club based in Mwanza. Established in 1968, the club competes in the Premier League.

In 1990, Pamba won the Tanzanian Premier League.

== Honours ==
- Tanzanian Premier League: 1990
- Nyerere Cup: 1989, 1992

== Performance in CAF competitions ==
- CAF Confederation Cup: 1 appearance

1991 African Cup of Champions Clubs – First Round

Appeared in the African winner's Cup in 1990 and won the preliminary round with a record 17 -1 goals aggregate when they played Anse-aux-Pins of Seychelles

== Stadium ==
Their home games are played at CCM Kirumba Stadium.

== Squad ==
As of 17 September 2022

Note: Flags indicate national team as defined under FIFA eligibility rules; some limited exceptions apply. Players may hold more than one non-FIFA nationality.

No.	Pos.	Nation	Player
30	GK	TAN	Wandwi William
29	DF	TAN	Yonah Johnson Haule
6	DF	TAN	Jamal Hilal Mwambeleko
24	DF	TAN	Salehe Seif Ferous Kambenga
5	DF	TAN	Novart Yohana Lufunga Nyanda
3	MF	TAN	Rajabu Rashid Rajabu
19	FW	TAN	Peter Mapunda Mapunda
38	MF	TAN	Shaban William Mkangara
23	FW	TAN	Herbert Charles Lukindo
30	DF	TAN	Mohamari Isa Saida

No.	Pos.	Nation	Player
18	MF	TAN	Seleman Hasan Mangoma
37	DF	TAN	Hassan Ayub Faiz
13	MF	TAN	Deogratius Anthony Kulwa
2	FW	TAN	Malulu Thomas Masunga
50	FW	TAN	Simon Cradius Zuberi
55	FW	TAN	Elinywesya Edward Sumbi
8	GK	TAN	Bruno Mrema
24	MF	TAN	Stephen Mganga
33	MF	TAN	Ali Ahmed Shiboli
34	MF	TAN	Kashiru Salum Nzige
