= Jamhuri Stadium (Dodoma) =

Stadium in Dodoma, Tanzania

Coordinates: 6.1731°S 35.7438°E

Jamhuri Stadium, Dodoma
- Uwanja wa Jamhuri, Dodoma
- Interactive map of Jamhuri Stadium, Dodoma
- Location: Dodoma, Tanzania
- Capacity: 30,000
- Type: Multi-purpose stadium

Tenant
- JKT Ruvu Stars

The Jamhuri Stadium (Republic Stadium) is a multi-purpose stadium in Dodoma, the capital city of Tanzania. It is currently used mostly for football matches and serves as the home venue for JKT Ruvu Stars. The venue holds 30,000 people.
