= Jamhuri Stadium (Morogoro) =

Jamhuri Stadium, Morogoro
- Uwanja wa Jamhuri, Morogoro
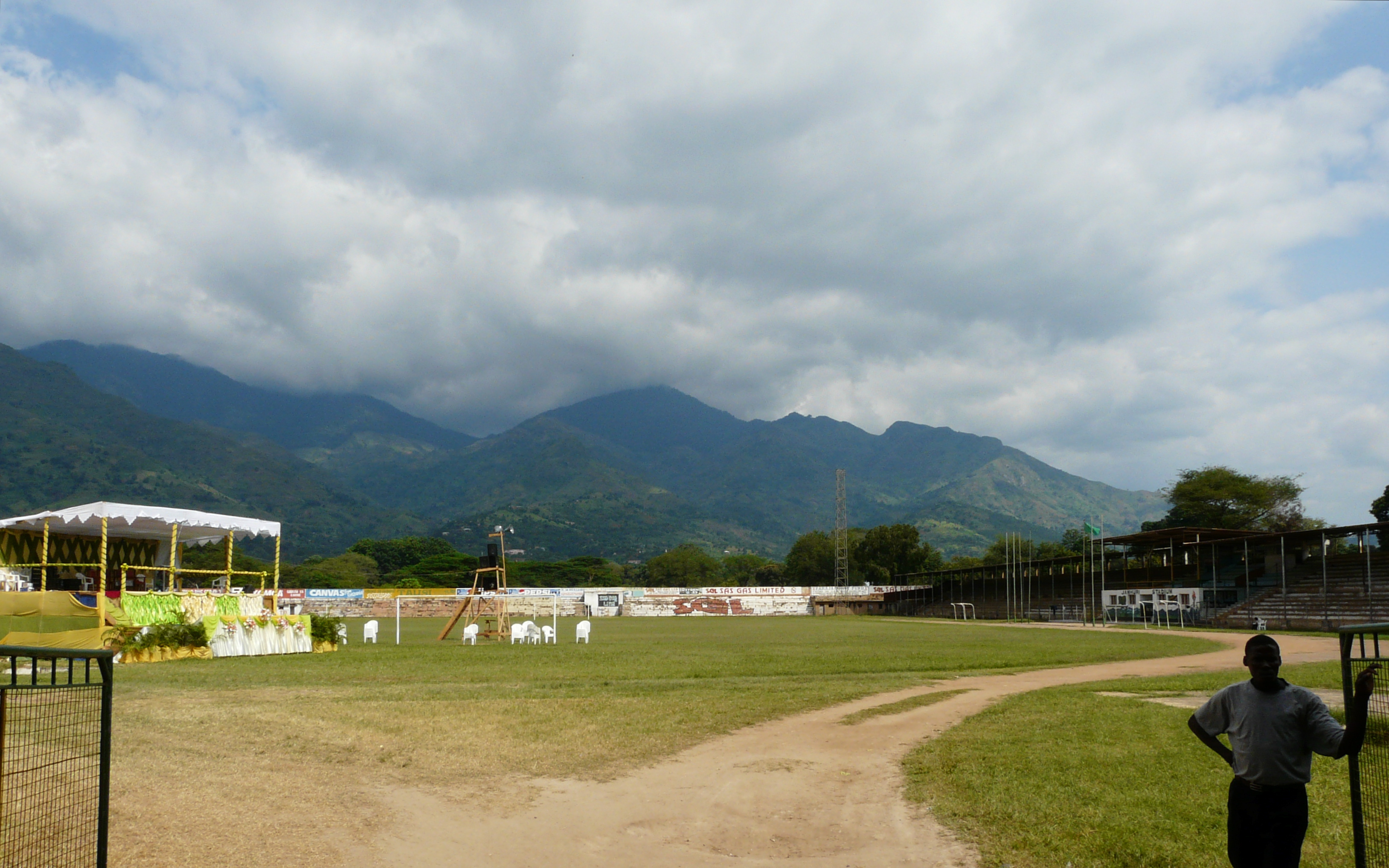
- Location: Morogoro, Tanzania
- Owner: Chama Cha Mapinduzi
- Capacity: 20,000
- Type: Multi-purpose stadium

Tenant
- Moro United F.C.

Website
- www.ccm.or.tz

Jamhuri Stadium is a multi-purpose stadium in Morogoro, Tanzania. It is currently used mostly for football matches and serves as the home venue for Moro United. It currently holds 20,000 people.
