= Eritrea national football team results =

The Eritrea national football team represents Eritrea in international football under the control of the Eritrean National Football Federation (ENFF). After the Eritrean War of Independence with Ethiopia, Eritrea gained de jure recognition in 1993. The football federation was founded in 1996 and affiliated to FIFA and the Confederation of African Football (CAF) in 1998.

The following list contains all results of Eritrea's official matches.

Contents
- 1992
- 1994
- 1998
- 1999
- 2000
- 2001
- 2002
- 2003
- 2005
- 2006
- 2007
- 2008
- 2009
- 2011
- 2012
- 2013
- 2015
- 2019
- 2020
- 2025
- 2026

- Key
- Pre-FIFA results
- FIFA results
- All-time record
- References
- External links

== Key ==
The coloured backgrounds denote the result of the match:

– indicates Eritrea won the match
– indicates Eritrea's opposition won the match
– indicates the match ended in a draw

== Pre-FIFA results ==
=== 1992 ===
| 26 June Friendly | Sudan | 1–1 | Eritrea | Sudan |
| | | Report |

| 28 June Friendly | Chad | 0–1 | Eritrea | Sudan |
| | | Report |

=== 1994 ===
| 29 November 1994 CECAFA Cup | Seychelles | 0–1 | Eritrea | Mumias, Kenya |
| | | Report | Yidnekachew Shitenew 12' | Stadium: Mumias Sports Complex |

| 1 December 1994 CECAFA Cup | Eritrea | 2–0 | Kenya | Mumias, Kenya |
| | | | | Stadium: Mumias Sports Complex |

| 3 December 1994 CECAFA Cup | Uganda | 0–0 | Eritrea | Nairobi, Kenya |
| | | Report | | Stadium: Moi International Sports Centre |

| 5 December 1994 CECAFA Cup | Tanzania | 1–0 | Eritrea | Nairobi, Kenya |
| | | Report | | Stadium: Moi International Sports Centre |

| 8 December 1994 CECAFA Cup | Kenya | 1–0 | Eritrea | Nairobi, Kenya |
| | | Report | | Stadium: Moi International Sports Centre |

== FIFA results ==
=== 1998 ===
| 26 June 2000 African Cup of Nations qualification | Mozambique | 3–1 | Eritrea | Maputo, Mozambique |
| | Dário Monteiro 30'; Tomás Inguana 35'; Jojó 44' | Report | Amanuel Iyassu 44' | Stadium: Estádio da Machava; Referee: Felix Tangawarima (Zimbabwe) |

=== 1999 ===
| 23 January 2000 African Cup of Nations qualification | Eritrea | 0–0 | Cameroon | Asmara, Eritrea |
| | | Report | | Stadium: Asmara Stadium; Referee: Ahmed El-Shinawi (Egypt) |

| 28 February 2000 African Cup of Nations qualification | Ghana | 5–0 | Eritrea | Accra, Ghana |
| | Augustine Ahinful 5'; Yaw Preko 27', 56', 84'; Peter Ofori-Quaye 68' | Report | | Stadium: Accra Sports Stadium |

| 6 June 2000 African Cup of Nations qualification | Cameroon | 1–0 | Eritrea | Yaoundé, Cameroon |
| | Rigobert Song 32' | Report | | Stadium: Stade Ahmadou Ahidjo; Referee: Haroun Boukar (Chad) |

| 19 June 2000 African Cup of Nations qualification | Eritrea | 1–0 | Mozambique | Asmara, Eritrea |
| | Yonas Fishaye 81' | Report | | Stadium: Asmara Stadium |

| 4 July 2000 African Cup of Nations qualification | Eritrea | 0–1 | Zimbabwe | Asmara, Eritrea |
| | | Report | Adam Ndlovu 25' | Stadium: Asmara Stadium |

| 18 July 2000 African Cup of Nations qualification | Senegal | 6–2 | Eritrea | Dakar, Senegal |
| | Papa Daouda Séne 2'; Salif Keita 21', 52'; Omar Traoré 30', 40'; Moussa N'Diaye 60' | Report | Fassil Abraha 58'; Yonas Fisahaye 68' | Stadium: Stade Léopold Sédar Senghor; Referee: Mohamed Guezzaz (Morocco) |

| 26 July 1999 CECAFA Cup | Eritrea | 0–0 | Rwanda B | Rwanda |
| | | | | Stadium: Stade Amahoro; Referee: Kigali, Rwanda |

| 28 July 1999 CECAFA Cup | Kenya | 1–0 | Eritrea | Rwanda |
| | Maurice Sunguti 58' | Report | | Stadium: Stade Amahoro; Referee: Kigali, Rwanda |

| 15 August 2000 African Cup of Nations qualification | Zimbabwe | 4–0 | Eritrea | Harare, Zimbabwe |
| | Adam Ndlovu 61'; Agent Sawu 69', 75', 90' | Report | | Stadium: National Stadium; Referee: Abdel Hamid Radwan (Egypt) |

| 21 August 2000 African Cup of Nations qualification | Eritrea | 0–2 | Senegal | Asmara, Eritrea |
| | | Report | Henri Camara 55'; Mame Ibra Touré 80' | Stadium: Asmara Stadium; Referee: Abdulhakim El Shelmani (Libya) |

=== 2000 ===
| 9 April 2002 FIFA World Cup qualification | Eritrea | 0–0 | Nigeria | Asmara, Eritrea |
| | | Report | | Stadium: Denden Stadium; Referee: Ahmed Auda (Egypt) |

| 22 April 2002 FIFA World Cup qualification | Nigeria | 4–0 | Eritrea | Lagos, Nigeria |
| | Benedict Akwuegbu 13'; Garba Lawal 20'; Jonathan Akpoborie 65'; Nwankwo Kanu 89' | Report | | Stadium: Lagos National Stadium; Referee: Manuel Monteiro Duarte (Cape Verde) |

| 2 July 2002 African Cup of Nations qualification | Sudan | 5–1 | Eritrea | Khartoum, Sudan |
| | Khalid Bakhit 4'; James Moga 11'; Mohamed Musa Dawod 54'; Hisham Seeni 56'; Amir Mustafa 86' | Report | Basili Abraham 6' | Stadium: Khartoum Stadium |

| 15 July 2002 African Cup of Nations qualification | Eritrea | 2–1 | Sudan | Asmara, Eritrea |
| | Fassil Abreha 33'; Yidnekachew Shimangus 45' | Report | Richard Justin Lado 66' | Stadium: Asmara Stadium |

| 28 October 2000 COMESA Cup | Rwanda | 1–0 | Eritrea | Lusaka, Zambia |
| | | Report |

| 20 November 2000 CECAFA Cup | Kenya | 0–0 | Eritrea | Mbale, Kenya |
| | | Report | | Stadium: Municipal Stadium |

| 23 November 2000 CECAFA Cup | Uganda B | 1–0 | Eritrea | Mbale, Kenya |
| | Moses Bantu 75' | | | Stadium: Municipal Stadium |

| 25 November 2000 CECAFA Cup | Eritrea | 1–1 | Rwanda | Mbale, Kenya |
| | Hamisi Bagumaho 10' | Report | Fassil Abreha 64' | Stadium: Municipal Stadium |

=== 2001 ===
| 10 December 2001 CECAFA Cup | Kenya | 2–1 | Eritrea | Kigali, Rwanda |
| | Tom Juma 75'; Maurice Sunguti 85' | Report | Yidnekachew Shimangus 38' | Stadium: Stade Amahoro |

| 12 December 2001 CECAFA Cup | Rwanda | 1–0 | Eritrea | Kigali, Rwanda |
| | Théoneste Muhayimana 62' | Report | | Stadium: Stade Amahoro |

| 14 December 2001 CECAFA Cup | Somalia | 0–0 | Eritrea | Kigali, Rwanda |
| | | Report | | Stadium: Stade Amahoro |

| 17 December 2001 CECAFA Cup | Kenya | 1–0 | Eritrea | Kigali, Rwanda |
| | Robert Aguda 89' | Report | | Stadium: Stade Amahoro |

=== 2002 ===
| 8 September 2004 African Cup of Nations qualification | Seychelles | 1–0 | Eritrea | Victoria, Seychelles |
| | Roddy Victor 50' | Report | | Stadium: Stade Linité; Referee: Benjamina Ravelontsalama (Madagascar) |

| 12 October 2004 African Cup of Nations qualification | Eritrea | 0–1 | Zimbabwe | Asmara, Eritrea |
| | | Report | Peter Ndlovu 10' | Stadium: Cicero Stadium; Referee: Omer Rirache (Djibouti) |

| 1 December 2002 CECAFA Cup | Burundi | 1–1 | Eritrea | Mwanza, Tanzania |
| | Makudi Juma 83' | Report | Yonas Fesehaye 87' | Stadium: CCM Kirumba Stadium |

| 4 December 2002 CECAFA Cup | Eritrea | 2–1 | Sudan | Mwanza, Tanzania |
| | Elias Debesay 14', 45' | Report | Faisal Agab 85' | Stadium: CCM Kirumba Stadium |

| 6 December 2002 CECAFA Cup | Kenya | 4–1 | Eritrea | Mwanza, Tanzania |
| | John Baraza 59', 90'; Dennis Oliech 69', 82' | Report | Berhane Aregaye 77' | Stadium: CCM Kirumba Stadium |

| 8 December 2002 CECAFA Cup | Eritrea | 1–1 | Tanzania | Mwanza, Tanzania |
| | Yonas Fesehaye 45' | Report | Ulimboka Mwakingwe 24' | Stadium: CCM Kirumba Stadium |

=== 2003 ===
| 30 March 2004 African Cup of Nations qualification | Eritrea | 0–2 | Mali | Asmara, Eritrea |
| | | Report | Brahim Thiam 54'; Dramane Coulibaly 89' | Stadium: Cicero Stadium; Referee: Abdulkadir Omar (Tanzania) |

| 7 June 2004 African Cup of Nations qualification | Mali | 1–0 | Eritrea | Bamako, Mali |
| | Soumaila Coulibaly 20' | Report | | Stadium: Stade du 26 Mars; Referee: Aboubacar Charaf (Ivory Coast) |

| 21 June 2004 African Cup of Nations qualification | Eritrea | 1–0 | Seychelles | Asmara, Eritrea |
| | Yonas Fesehaye 62' | Report | | Stadium: Cicero Stadium |

| 5 July 2004 African Cup of Nations qualification | Zimbabwe | 2–0 | Eritrea | Harare, Zimbabwe |
| | Peter Ndlovu 11', 17' (pen.) | Report | | Stadium: National Sports Stadium |

| 11 October 2006 FIFA World Cup qualification | Sudan | 3–0 | Eritrea | Khartoum, Sudan |
| | Haytham Tambal 10'; Haitham Elrasheed 30'; Mujahid Ahmed 77' | Report | | Stadium: Khartoum Stadium; Referee: Coffi Codjia (Benin) |

| 14 November 2006 FIFA World Cup qualification | Eritrea | 0–0 | Sudan | Asmara, Eritrea |
| | | Report | | Stadium: Cicero Stadium; Referee: Eddy Maillet (Seychelles) |

| 30 November 2003 CECAFA Cup | Uganda | 2–1 | Eritrea | Kassala, Sudan |
| | Joseph Kabagambe 43'; Henry Kabeta 60' | Report | Ghirmay Shinash 70' | Stadium: Stade Al-Merghani Kassala |

| 2 December 2003 CECAFA Cup | Kenya | 3–2 | Eritrea | Kassala, Sudan |
| | James Omondi 27'; Anthony Mathenge 90+1'; Titus Mulama 90+3' | Report | Testfaldet Goitom 30', 48' | Stadium: Stade Al-Merghani Kassala |

=== 2005 ===
| 28 November 2005 CECAFA Cup | Eritrea | 0–3 | Zanzibar | Kigali, Rwanda |
| | | Report | | Stadium: Stade Amahoro |

| 30 November 2005 CECAFA Cup | Eritrea | 2–3 | Rwanda | Kigali, Rwanda |
| | Suleman Mohamed, | Report | Jimmy Gatete; Jean Lomami, | Stadium: Stade Amahoro |

| 2 December 2005 CECAFA Cup | Burundi | 0–0 | Eritrea | Kigali, Rwanda |
| | | Report | | Stadium: Stade Amahoro |

| 4 December 2005 CECAFA Cup | Eritrea | 0–1 | Tanzania | Kigali, Rwanda |
| | | Report | Nurdin Bakari 38' | Stadium: Stade Amahoro |

=== 2006 ===
| 2 September 2008 Africa Cup of Nations qualification | Kenya | 1–2 | Eritrea | Nairobi, Kenya |
| | Robert Mambo Mumba 65' | Report | Arnold Origi 60' (o.g.); Yidnekachew Shimangus 68' | Stadium: Moi International Sports Centre |

| 7 October 2008 Africa Cup of Nations qualification | Eritrea | 0–0 | Eswatini | Asmara, Eritrea |
| | | Report | | Stadium: Asmara Stadium |

=== 2007 ===
| 7 January Friendly | Yemen | 4–1 | Eritrea | Sanaa, Yemen |
| | Akram Al-Worafi 54'; Fekri Yahia Al-Hubaishi 71'; Yaser Ba Suhai 73'; Nashwan Al-Haggam 79' | Report | Yidnekachew Shimangus | Stadium: Althawra Sports City Stadium |

| 25 March 2008 Africa Cup of Nations qualification | Angola | 6–1 | Eritrea | Luanda, Angola |
| | Flávio Amado 26', 69'; Mantorras 35'; Zé Kalanga 41'; António Mendonça 51'; Paulo José Figueiredo 80' | Report | Tenese Gay 58' | Stadium: Estádio da Cidadela |

| 21 May Friendly | Eritrea | 1–0 | Sudan | Asmara, Eritrea |
| | Yidnekachew Shimangus 46' | Report | | Stadium: Asmara Stadium |

| 26 May Friendly | Eritrea | 1–1 | Sudan | Asmara, Eritrea |
| | ??? 90' | Report | Mujahed Ahmed Mohamed 10' | Stadium: Cicero Stadium |

| 2 June 2008 Africa Cup of Nations qualification | Eritrea | 1–1 | Angola | Asmara, Eritrea |
| | Elias Ali Abubeker 17' | Report | Norberto Mulenessa Maurito 88' | Stadium: Asmara Stadium |

| 16 June 2008 Africa Cup of Nations qualification | Eritrea | 1–0 | Kenya | Asmara, Eritrea |
| | Berhane Aregay 80' | Report | | Stadium: Asmara Stadium |

| 9 September 2008 Africa Cup of Nations qualification | Eswatini | 0–0 | Eritrea | Manzini, Swaziland (since 2018 renamed to Eswatini) |
| | | Report | | Stadium: Trade Fair Ground |

| 30 November Friendly | Sudan | 1–0 | Eritrea | Omdurman, Sudan |
| | ??? | Report | | Stadium: Al-Merreikh Stadium |

| 3 December Friendly | Sudan | 1–0 | Eritrea | Omdurman, Sudan |
| | ??? | Report | | Stadium: Al-Merreikh Stadium |

| 9 December 2007 CECAFA Cup | Rwanda | 2–1 | Eritrea | Dar es Salaam, Tanzania |
| | Haruna Niyonzima 6'; Kamana Bokota 41' | Report | Berhane Aregaye 38' | Stadium: National Stadium |

| 11 December 2007 CECAFA Cup | Djibouti | 2–3 | Eritrea | Dar es Salaam, Tanzania |
| | Ahmed Daher 71'; Mohammed Kader 86' | Report | Berhane Aregaye 6'; Yidnekachew Shimangus 46'; Jonas Fesehaye 69' | Stadium: National Stadium |

| 14 December 2007 CECAFA Cup | Eritrea | 3–2 | Uganda | Dar es Salaam, Tanzania |
| | Elmon Temekribon 53', 62'; Samuel Ghebrehine 82' | Report | Ronald Maganga 54'; Danny Wagaluka 74' | Stadium: National Stadium |

| 17 December 2007 CECAFA Cup | Burundi | 2–1 | Eritrea | Dar es Salaam, Tanzania |
| | Claude Nahimana 69'; Alain Ndizeye 80' | Report | Berhane Aregaye 4' | Stadium: National Stadium |

=== 2008 ===
| 30 March 2009 ANC qualification | Eritrea | 2–2 | Uganda | Asmara, Eritrea |
| | ???; ??? | Report | Anthony Bongole; Simon Sserunkuma |

| 12 April 2009 ANC qualification | Uganda | 3–0 | Eritrea | Uganda |
| | Steven Bengo 40'; Geoffrey Sserunkuuma 69'; Dan Wagaluka 90' | Report |

=== 2009 ===
| 1 December 2009 CECAFA Cup | Zimbabwe | 0–0 | Eritrea | Nairobi, Kenya |
| | | Report | | Stadium: Nyayo National Stadium |

| 3 December 2009 CECAFA Cup | Eritrea | 1–2 | Rwanda | Nairobi, Kenya |
| | Testfaldet Goitom 85' | Report | Yusuf Ndayishimiye 15'; Ermias Wolday 35' (o.g.) | Stadium: Nyayo National Stadium |

| 5 December 2009 CECAFA Cup | Eritrea | 3–1 | Somalia | Nairobi, Kenya |
| | Isaias Andberhian 15' (pen.); Filmon Tseqay 27'; Yassin Ali Egal 60' (o.g.) | Report | Mohamed Hassan Ali 70' | Stadium: Nyayo National Stadium |

| 8 December 2009 CECAFA Cup | Tanzania | 4–0 | Eritrea | Nairobi, Kenya |
| | John Bocco 62'; Mrisho Ngassa 65', 78', 85' | Report | | Stadium: Nyayo National Stadium |

=== 2011 ===
| 19 August Friendly | Eritrea | 0–3 | Sudan | Asmara, Eritrea |
| | | Report | Badreldin Al-Doud Galag; Ahmed Adam El-Basha; Abuelgasim Saeed | Stadium: Cicero Stadium |

| 11 November 2014 FIFA World Cup qualification | Eritrea | 1–1 | Rwanda | Asmara, Eritrea |
| | Tesfalem Tekle 35' | Report | Elias Uzamukunda 58' | Stadium: Cicero Stadium; Referee: Mahamadou Keita (Mali) |

| 15 November 2014 FIFA World Cup qualification | Rwanda | 3–1 | Eritrea | Kigali, Rowanda |
| | Olivier Karekezi 4'; Jean-Claude Iranzi 70'; Labama Bokota 79' | Report | Abraham Tedros 89' | Stadium: Stade Amahoro; Referee: Joshua Bondo (Botswana) |

=== 2012 ===
| 26 November 2012 CECAFA Cup | Zanzibar | 0–0 | Eritrea | Kampala, Uganda |
| | | Report | | Stadium: Mandela National Stadium; Referee: Anthony Ogwayo (Kenya) |

| 29 November 2012 CECAFA Cup | Malawi | 3–2 | Eritrea | Kampala, Uganda |
| | Chiukepo Msowoya 3', 67'; Miciam Mhone 11' | Report | Yosief Ghide 69'; Hermon Tecleab 90' (pen.) | Stadium: Mandela National Stadium; Referee: Dennis Batte (Uganda) |

| 1 December 2012 CECAFA Cup | Eritrea | 0–2 | Rwanda | Kampala, Uganda |
| | | Report | Dady Birori 16'; Tumaine Ntamuhanga 77' | Stadium: Lugogo Stadium; Referee: Israel Mujuni (Tanzania) |

=== 2013 ===
| 29 November 2013 CECAFA Cup | Sudan | 3–0 | Eritrea | Machakos, Kenya |
| | Salah Ibrahim 6', 27'; Muhannad El Tahir 33' | Report | | Stadium: Kenyatta Stadium |

| 2 December 2013 CECAFA Cup | Eritrea | 0–3 | Uganda | Machakos, Kenya |
| | | Report | Emmanuel Okwi 9', 38'; Hamis Kiiza 20' (pen.) | Stadium: Kenyatta Stadium |

| 5 December 2013 CECAFA Cup | Rwanda | 1–0 | Eritrea | Machakos, Kenya |
| | Michel Ndahinduka 74' | Report | | Stadium: Kenyatta Stadium |

=== 2015 ===
| 10 October 2018 FIFA World Cup qualification | Eritrea | 0–2 | Botswana | Asmara, Eritrea |
| | | Report | Galabgwe Moyana 22'; Joel Mogorosi 64' | Stadium: Cicero Stadium; Referee: Ibrahim Nour El Din (Egypt) |

| 13 October 2018 FIFA World Cup qualification | Botswana | 3–1 | Eritrea | Francistown, Botswana |
| | Mogakolodi Ngele 15', 79'; Joel Mogorosi 21' | Report | Henok Goitom 9' | Stadium: Francistown Stadium; Referee: Nelson Fred (Seychelles) |

=== 2019 ===
| 4 September 2022 FIFA World Cup qualification | Eritrea | 1–2 | Namibia | Asmara, Eritrea |
| | Ali Sulieman 65' | Report | Peter Shalulile 50'; Esey Tesfay 58' (o.g.) | Stadium: Denden Stadium; Referee: Mohamed Ali Moussa (Niger) |

| 10 September 2022 FIFA World Cup qualification | Namibia | 2–0 | Eritrea | Windhoek, Namibia |
| | Absalom Iimbondi 25'; Peter Shalulile 90+2' | Report | | Stadium: Sam Nujoma Stadium; Referee: Roland Danon (Ivory Coast) |

| 9 December 2019 CECAFA Cup | Eritrea | 1–0 | Burundi | Kampala, Uganda |
| | Robel Kidane 45+2' | Report | | Stadium: Lugogo Stadium; Referee: Anthony Ogwayo (Kenya) |

| 11 December 2019 CECAFA Cup | Eritrea | 0–2 | Uganda | Kampala, Uganda |
| | | Report | Nicholas Kazozi 58'; Mustafa Kizza 76' (pen.) | Stadium: Lugogo Stadium; Referee: Omar Abdulkadir Artan (Somalia) |

| 13 December 2019 CECAFA Cup | Djibouti | 0–3 | Eritrea | Kampala, Uganda |
| | | Report | Abel Okbay 11'; Ali Sulieman 65', 82' | Stadium: Lugogo Stadium; Referee: Thierry Nkurunziza (Burundi) |

| 15 December 2019 CECAFA Cup | Somalia | 0–0 | Eritrea | Kampala, Uganda |
| | | Report | | Stadium: Lugogo Stadium; Referee: Anthony Ogwayo (Kenya) |

| 17 December 2019 CECAFA Cup | Kenya | 1–4 | Eritrea | Kampala, Uganda |
| | Oscar Musa Wamalwa 52' | Report | Oscar Musa Wamalwa 19' (o.g.); Abel Okbay 49'; Michael Habte 66'; Robel Kidane 74' | Stadium: Lugogo Stadium; Referee: Sabri Mohamed Fadul (Sudan) |

| 19 December 2019 CECAFA Cup | Uganda | 3–0 | Eritrea | Kampala, Uganda |
| | Bright Anukani 31'; Mustafa Kizza 68'; Joel Madondo 88' | Report | | Stadium: Lugogo Stadium; Referee: Sabri Mohamed Fadul (Sudan) |

=== 2020 ===
| 25 January Friendly | Eritrea | 0–1 | Sudan | Asmara, Eritrea |
| | | Report | Yaser Muzmel 30' | Stadium: Cicero Stadium |

=== 2025 ===
| 26 May Friendly | Eritrea | 0–0 | Niger | Asmara, Eritrea |
| | | Report | | Stadium: Cicero Stadium |

| 28 May Friendly | Eritrea | 0–1 | Niger | Asmara, Eritrea |
| | | Report | Mohamed Abdramane 12' | Stadium: Cicero Stadium |

=== 2026 ===
| 25 March 2027 AFCON qualification | Eritrea | 2–0 | Eswatini | Meknes, Morocco |
| 17:00 UTC+1 | Teklezghi 81'; Sulieman 90+4' | Report | | Stadium: Stade d'Honneur; Referee: Moussa Diou (Mauritania) |

| 31 March 2027 AFCON qualification | Eswatini | 1–2 | Eritrea | Lobamba, Eswatini |
| 16:00 UTC+2 | Figuareido 90+4' | Report | Sulieman 50', 57' | Stadium: Somhlolo National Stadium; Referee: Josefa Aurelio (São Tomé and Príncipe) |

| 26 September 2027 AFCON qualification | Kenya | 1–1 | Eritrea | Nairobi, Kenya |
| 16:00 UTC+3 | Ogam 87' | Report | Girmai 36' | Stadium: Nyayo National Stadium; Referee: Mohamed Athoumani (Comoros) |

| 30 September 2027 AFCON qualification | Eritrea | 0–5 | South Africa | Cairo, Egypt |
| 19:00 UTC+3 | | Report | Mofokeng 19', 45+1'; Sithole 52'; Rayners 63'; Singh 90+4' | Stadium: Al Salam Stadium; Referee: Lamin Jammeh (Gambia) |

| 12 November 2027 AFCON qualification | Guinea | 2–1 | Eritrea | Conakry, Guinea |
| 17:00 UTC+0 | Soumah 13'; Gnagna Barry 53' | Report | Lundgren 82' | Stadium: 28 September Stadium; Referee: Patrick Tanguy Vlei (Ivory Coast) |

| 15 November 2027 AFCON qualification | Eritrea | 1–3 | Guinea | Cairo, Egypt |
| 17:00 UTC+2 | Sulieman 90+2' | Report | Soumah 28'; Gnagna Barry 52' 77' | Stadium: Al Salam Stadium; Referee: Godfrey Nkhakanaga (Kenya) |

== All-time record ==
Key

- Pld = Matches played
- W = Matches won
- D = Matches drawn
- L = Matches lost
- GF = Goals for
- GA = Goals against
- GD = Goal differential
- Countries are listed in alphabetical order

As of 15 November 2026

Positive Record Neutral Record Negative Record

| Opponent | Pld | W | D | L | GF | GA | GD |
|---|---|---|---|---|---|---|---|
| Angola | 2 | 0 | 1 | 1 | 2 | 7 | -5 |
| Botswana | 2 | 0 | 0 | 2 | 1 | 5 | -4 |
| Burundi | 4 | 1 | 2 | 1 | 3 | 3 | 0 |
| Cameroon | 2 | 0 | 1 | 1 | 0 | 1 | -1 |
| Djibouti | 2 | 2 | 0 | 0 | 6 | 2 | +4 |
| Eswatini | 4 | 2 | 2 | 0 | 4 | 1 | +3 |
| Ghana | 1 | 0 | 0 | 1 | 0 | 5 | -5 |
| Guinea | 2 | 0 | 0 | 2 | 2 | 5 | -3 |
| Kenya | 11 | 3 | 1 | 7 | 12 | 15 | -3 |
| Mali | 2 | 0 | 0 | 2 | 0 | 3 | -3 |
| Malawi | 1 | 0 | 0 | 1 | 2 | 3 | -1 |
| Mozambique | 2 | 1 | 0 | 1 | 2 | 3 | -1 |
| Namibia | 2 | 0 | 0 | 2 | 1 | 4 | −3 |
| Niger | 2 | 0 | 1 | 1 | 0 | -1 | -1 |
| Nigeria | 2 | 0 | 1 | 1 | 0 | 4 | −4 |
| Rwanda | 10 | 0 | 2 | 8 | 7 | 16 | −9 |
| Senegal | 2 | 0 | 0 | 2 | 2 | 8 | −6 |
| Seychelles | 3 | 2 | 0 | 1 | 2 | 1 | +1 |
| Somalia | 3 | 1 | 2 | 0 | 3 | 1 | +2 |
| South Africa | 1 | 0 | 0 | 1 | 0 | 5 | −5 |
| Sudan | 12 | 3 | 2 | 7 | 7 | 20 | −13 |
| Tanzania | 4 | 0 | 1 | 3 | 1 | 7 | −6 |
| Uganda | 8 | 1 | 2 | 5 | 6 | 17 | −11 |
| Yemen | 1 | 0 | 0 | 1 | 1 | 4 | −3 |
| Zanzibar | 2 | 0 | 1 | 1 | 0 | 3 | -3 |
| Zimbabwe | 5 | 0 | 1 | 4 | 0 | 8 | -8 |
| Total | 97 | 18 | 21 | 58 | 60 | 151 | −91 |
