= Somalia national football team results =

As a member of FIFA and CAF, the Somalia national football team has been playing official matches since 1963.

Somalia's first game came in 1958 in Mombasa, Kenya, resulting in a 5–1 loss for Somalia against Kenya.

== List of matches ==
=== 1958 ===
1958 Friendly	Kenya	5–1	Somalia	Mombasa, Kenya

=== 1963–1969 ===
14 November 1963 1963 GANEFO	North Korea	14–0	Somalia	Jakarta, Indonesia

5 January 1969 Friendly	Ethiopia	7–0	Somalia	Ethiopia

7 January 1969 Friendly	Uganda	7–1	Somalia	Ethiopia

=== 1970–1979 ===
18 January 1972 Friendly	Somalia	1–3	China	Mogadishu, Somalia
				Attendance: 8,000

24 November 1972 1973 AGQ	Egypt	4–2	Somalia	Cairo, Egypt
				Stadium: Cairo International Stadium

28 November 1972 1973 AGQ	Kenya	2–2	Somalia	Cairo, Egypt
				Stadium: Cairo International Stadium

30 November 1972 1973 AGQ	Uganda	0–1	Somalia	Cairo, Egypt
				Stadium: Cairo International Stadium

17 June 1973 Friendly	China	7–4	Somalia	Beijing, China
				Stadium: Workers' Stadium

12 August 1973 1974 AFCONQ	Somalia	2–0	Uganda	Mogadishu, Somalia

26 August 1973 1974 AFCONQ	Uganda	5–0 (5–2 agg.)	Somalia	Kampala, Uganda

22 September 1973 1973 CECAFA	Uganda	6–1	Somalia	Uganda

24 September 1973 1973 CECAFA	Zambia B	6–1	Somalia	Uganda

10 September 1974 Friendly	Libya	3–2	Somalia	Libya

3 November 1974 1974 CECAFA	Zanzibar	2–1	Somalia	Tanzania

4 November 1974 1974 CECAFA	Uganda	1–1	Somalia	Tanzania

10 August 1975 1976 AFCONQ	Somalia	0–2	Burundi	Mogadishu, Somalia

24 August 1975 1976 AFCONQ	Burundi	0–1 (2–1 agg.)	Somalia	Bujumbura, Burundi

6 November 1976 1976 CECAFA	Uganda	2–0	Somalia	Zanzibar City, Tanzania
	Ayiekoh 34'; Nsereko 40'			Stadium: Amaan Stadium

8 November 1976 1976 CECAFA	Zambia	4–2	Somalia	Zanzibar City, Tanzania
	Chanda 30', 55'; Simulambo 7'; Sinyangwe 65'		Abdi 25', 85' (pen.)	Stadium: Amaan Stadium

11 November 1976 1976 CECAFA	Zanzibar	1–0	Somalia	Zanzibar City, Tanzania
	Hamadi 70'			Stadium: Amaan Stadium

12 November 1977 1978 AGQ	Egypt	4–0	Somalia	Cairo, Egypt
	Mokhtar 5'; El-Sheikh 10'; Khalil 15'; Shehata 82'			Stadium: Cairo International Stadium

14 November 1977 1978 AGQ	Sudan	2–0	Somalia	Cairo, Egypt
				Stadium: Cairo International Stadium

25 November 1977 1977 CECAFA	Somalia	0–1	Kenya	Mogadishu, Somalia
			Adero	Stadium: Mogadishu Stadium

30 November 1977 1977 CECAFA	Somalia	1–0	Zanzibar	Mogadishu, Somalia
				Stadium: Mogadishu Stadium

3 December 1977 1977 CECAFA	Somalia	1–1	Uganda	Mogadishu, Somalia
				Stadium: Mogadishu Stadium

3 November 1978 1978 CECAFA	Malawi	3–1	Somalia	Malawi
	Phiri; Chikafa; Gondwe		Goal

9 November 1978 1978 CECAFA	Zambia	4–0	Somalia	Malawi
	Chitalu; Chola ?

11 November 1978 1978 CECAFA	Kenya	1–0	Somalia	Malawi

13 November 1978 1978 CECAFA	Somalia	2–2	Uganda	Malawi

=== 1980–1989 ===
16 July 1980 1982 WCQ	Niger	0–0	Somalia	Niamey, Niger
				Stadium: Stade du 29 Julliet; Attendance: 20,000; Referee: Tevi Lawson-Hetcheli (Togo)

27 July 1980 1982 WCQ	Somalia	1–1	Niger	Mogadishu, Somalia
	Mohammed 90'		Kanfideni 30'	Stadium: Mogadishu Stadium; Attendance: 13,000; Referee: Demeke Abate (Ethiopia)

17 November 1980 1980 CECAFA	Tanzania	1–1	Somalia	Khartoum, Sudan

20 November 1980 1980 CECAFA	Sudan	2–0	Somalia	Khartoum, Sudan
	Ammar; Aljili

19September 1982 1984 AFCONQ	Somalia	0–1	Rwanda	Mogadishu, Somalia

January 1983 Friendly	Somalia	1–1	Sudan	Saudi Arabia

14 November 1983 1983 CECAFA	Zanzibar	1–1	Somalia	Kenya

17 November 1983 1983 CECAFA	Malawi	2–1	Somalia	Kenya
	Chimodzi ?		Shiri

19 November 1983 1983 CECAFA	Zimbabwe	2–1	Somalia	Kenya

9 November 1984 1986 AFCONQ	Somalia	1–0	Kenya	Mogadishu, Somalia

23 November 1984 1986 AFCONQ	Kenya	1–0 (1–1 agg.) (4–3 p)	Somalia	Nairobi, Kenya
	Muse 53' (o.g.)			Stadium: Nyayo National Stadium

3 December 1984 1984 CECAFA	Somalia	2–1	Zanzibar	Uganda
	Said Hussein; Ali Muse

6 December 1984 1984 CECAFA	Malawi	1–0	Somalia	Uganda
	Sinalo

8 December 1984 1984 CECAFA	Kenya	1–1 (5–4 p)	Somalia	Uganda
	Ayoyi

4 August 1985 1985 PAG	Morocco	3–0	Somalia	Rabat, Morocco
	Timoumi; Laghrissi			Stadium: Moulay Abdellah Stadium

7 August 1985 1985 PAG	Somalia	5–2	Mauritania	Rabat, Morocco
				Stadium: Moulay Abdellah Stadium

10 August 1985 1985 PAG	Somalia	1–2	Tunisia	Rabat, Morocco
	Abdi 81'		Jaziri 15' (pen.); Rakbaoui 56'	Stadium: Moulay Abdellah Stadium

5 October 1986 1988 AFCONQ	Uganda	5–0	Somalia	Kampala, Uganda

7 October 1986 Friendly	Kenya	2–1	Somalia	Kenya
			Ali Yusuf

19 October 1986 1988 AFCONQ	Somalia	0–0	Uganda	Mogadishu, Somalia

=== 1990–1999 ===
26 November 1994 1994 CECAFA	Kenya (A)	3–1	Somalia	Nairobi, Kenya
	Odour 4'; Lwanga 72'; Swaka 82'		Abdi 9'

29 November 1994 1994 CECAFA	Tanzania	4–0	Somalia	Nairobi, Kenya
	11'; Masatu 67'; Selemani 74'; Nteze 84'

1 December 1994 1994 CECAFA	Somalia	2–1	Djibouti	Nairobi, Kenya
	Mayow 13' (o.g.); Abanur 50'		Guley 22'

28 November 1995 1995 CECAFA	Uganda (B)	3–1	Somalia	Bugembe, Uganda
				Stadium: Bugembe Stadium

1 December 1995 1995 CECAFA	Tanzania	7–0	Somalia	Bugembe, Uganda
				Stadium: Bugembe Stadium

3 December 1995 1995 CECAFA	Ethiopia	5–0	Somalia	Bugembe, Uganda
				Stadium: Bugembe Stadium

27 July 1999 1999 CECAFA	Burundi	3–0	Somalia	Rwanda

29 July 1999 1999 CECAFA	Somalia	0–2	Uganda	Rwanda

=== 2000–2009 ===
19 April 2000 2002 WCQ	Somalia	0–3	Cameroon	Yaoundé, Cameroon
16:00 (UTC+1)		Report	Mboma 26'; Foé 31'; Eto'o 37'	Stadium: Stade Ahmadou Ahidjo; Attendance: 35,000; Referee: Thomas Boko (Benin)

23 April 2000 2002 WCQ	Cameroon	3–0 (6–0 agg.)	Somalia	Yaoundé, Cameroon
16:00 (UTC+1)	Jama Mba 15', 27'; Olembé 48'	Report		Stadium: Stade Ahmadou Ahidjo; Attendance: 20,000; Referee: Pierre Alain Mounguengui (Gabon)

19 November 2000 2000 CECAFA	Djibouti	0–0	Somalia	Kampala, Uganda
				Stadium: Nakivubo Stadium

21 November 2000 2000 CECAFA	Somalia	1–2	Ethiopia	Kampala, Uganda
	Mohamed 39'		Getachew 30'; Semen 55'	Stadium: Nakivubo Stadium

23 November 2000 2000 CECAFA	Uganda (A)	6–0	Somalia	Kampala, Uganda
	Mukasa; Makokha; Mubiru; Buwembo; Kalungi			Stadium: Nakivubo Stadium

26 November 2000 2000 CECAFA	Somalia	0–3	Burundi	Kampala, Uganda
			Daoudi 63' (pen.); Ndikumana 76'; Kimada 86'	Stadium: Nakivubo Stadium

8 December 2001 2001 CECAFA	Rwanda (A)	3–0	Somalia	Rwanda
	Hassan Milli 5' 60'; Olivier Karekezi 70'

12 December 2001 2001 CECAFA	Kenya	3–0	Somalia	Rwanda
	Robert Mambo 34' 45'; Titus Mulama 47'

14 December 2001 2001 CECAFA	Somalia	0–0	Eritrea	Rwanda

1 December 2002 2002 CECAFA	Somalia	0–2	Uganda	Arusha, Tanzania
			Sserunkuma 48'; Tabula 53'	Stadium: Sheikh Amri Abeid Memorial Stadium

3 December 2002 2002 CECAFA	Somalia	0–1	Rwanda	Arusha, Tanzania
			Karekezi 53'	Stadium: Sheikh Amri Abeid Memorial Stadium

5 December 2002 2002 CECAFA	Zanzibar	1–0	Somalia	Arusha, Tanzania
	Ali 39'			Stadium: Sheikh Amri Abeid Memorial Stadium

7 December 2002 2002 CECAFA	Ethiopia	0–1	Somalia	Arusha, Tanzania
			Mohamed 32'	Stadium: Sheikh Amri Abeid Memorial Stadium

16 November 2003 2006 WCQ	Somalia	0–5	Ghana	Accra, Ghana
15:00 UTC+0		Report	Arhin Duah 25', 56'; Boakye 69', 89'; Gyan 82'	Stadium: Ohene Djan Stadium; Attendance: 19,447; Referee: Bakoubebile Bebou (Togo)

19 November 2003 2006 WCQ	Ghana	2–0 (7–0 agg.)	Somalia	Kumasi, Ghana
16:00 UTC+0	Appiah 27'; Adjei 90'	Report		Stadium: Baba Yara Stadium; Attendance: 12,000; Referee: Ibrahim Chaibou (Niger)

12 December 2004 2004 CECAFA	Uganda	2–0	Somalia	Addis Ababa, Ethiopia
	David Kalungi 30', 42'			Stadium: Addis Ababa Stadium

14 December 2004 2004 CECAFA	Somalia	0–1	Kenya	Addis Ababa, Ethiopia
			John Baraza 7'	Stadium: Addis Ababa Stadium

18 December 2004 2004 CECAFA	Sudan	4–0	Somalia	Addis Ababa, Ethiopia
	Haitham Mustafa 47'; Abdel Hameedama 63'; Haytham Tambal 69'; Mohamed Omer Adam 90'			Stadium: Addis Ababa Stadium

27 November 2005 2005 CECAFA	Djibouti	1–2	Somalia	Kigali, Rwanda
	Abdul Rahman Okishi		Abdul Hakim; Mahmoud Sharki	Stadium: Amahoro Stadium

29 November 2005 2005 CECAFA	Somalia	1–4	Sudan	Kigali, Rwanda
	Mohamed Sheikh		Bader Eldin; Faisal Agab; Haytham Tambal	Stadium: Amahoro Stadium

1 December 2005 2005 CECAFA	Somalia	0–7	Uganda	Kigali, Rwanda
			Geoffrey Massa; Stephen Nsereko; Hassan Mubiru; Vincent Kayizi; Morley Byekwaso	Stadium: Amahoro Stadium

5 December 2005 2005 CECAFA	Ethiopia	3–1	Somalia	Kigali, Rwanda
				Stadium: Amahoro Stadium

27 November 2006 2006 CECAFA	Somalia	0–3	Rwanda	Addis Ababa, Ethiopia
			Yusuf Kayihuwa 16'; Robert Ujenza 87'; Haruna Nionzima 87'	Stadium: Addis Ababa Stadium

30 November 2006 2006 CECAFA	Sudan	3–0	Somalia	Addis Ababa, Ethiopia
	Natali Gemi 15', 78'; Zakariah Abdi Zuhar 68'			Stadium: Addis Ababa Stadium

3 December 2006 2006 CECAFA	Uganda	2–0	Somalia	Addis Ababa, Ethiopia
	Daniel Wangaluka 11'; Alimasi Kadogo 17'			Stadium: Addis Ababa Stadium

21 December 2006 2009 ANCQ	Sudan	6–1	Somalia	Beirut, Lebanon
	Muhannad Eltahir 8'; Mohamed Ali Khaider 16', 18'; Haitham Mustafa 21' (pen.); Faisal Agab 30'; Gemi Natali 55'		Ali Abdelaziz 90+3'	Stadium: Beirut Municipal Stadium

24 December 2006 2009 ANCQ	Lebanon	4–0	Somalia	Beirut, Lebanon
	Mohammed Ghaddar 4', 28'; Ali Nasseredine 72'; Paul Rustom 83'			Stadium: Camille Chamoun Sports City Stadium

27 December 2006 2009 ANCQ	Somalia	2–8	Mauritania	Beirut, Lebanon
	Ali Abdelaziz 26' (pen.), 67'		Sidibe Mohamed 4' (pen.), 24'; Corville Pascal Dominique 14', 27' (pen.); Alioune Ndiaye 30', 43'; Katri Khuro 75', 88'	Stadium: Beirut Municipal Stadium

16 November 2007 2010 WCQ	Djibouti	1–0	Somalia	Djibouti City, Djibouti
16:00 UTC+3	H. Yassin 84'	Report		Stadium: El Hadj Hassan Gouled Aptidon Stadium; Attendance: 10,000; Referee: Khalid Abdel Rahman (Sudan)

10 December 2007 2007 CECAFA	Somalia	0–3	Burundi	Dar es Salaam, Tanzania
		Report	Aime Nzohabonayo 19'; Seleman Ndikumana 77' 82'	Stadium: National Stadium

12 December 2007 2007 CECAFA	Tanzania	1–0	Somalia	Dar es Salaam, Tanzania
	Michael Chuma 65'	Report		Stadium: National Stadium

14 December 2007 2007 CECAFA	Kenya	2–0	Somalia	Dar es Salaam, Tanzania
	John Mwangi 45'; Allan Wanga 55'	Report		Stadium: National Stadium

23 December 2008 Friendly	Djibouti	2–3	Somalia	Djibouti
	?	Report	Midnimo (?); Baashi (?); Yusuf (?)

1 January 2009 2008 CECAFA	Zanzibar	2–0	Somalia	Kampala, Uganda
	Aggrey Morris 23' 90' (pen.)			Stadium: Mandela National Stadium

3 January 2009 2008 CECAFA	Somalia	1–0	Tanzania	Kampala, Uganda
	Cisse Aadan Abshir 14'			Stadium: Mandela National Stadium

5 January 2009 2008 CECAFA	Rwanda	3–0	Somalia	Kampala, Uganda
	Eric Gesana 67' 85'; Kamana Bokota 87'			Stadium: Mandela National Stadium

7 January 2009 2008 CECAFA	Uganda	4–0	Somalia	Kampala, Uganda
	Tony Mawejje 31' 39' 65'; Geoffrey Massa 75'			Stadium: Mandela National Stadium

29 November 2009 2009 CECAFA	Somalia	0–1	Rwanda	Nairobi, Kenya
16:00			Bader 4' (o.g.)	Stadium: Nyayo National Stadium

3 December 2009 2009 CECAFA	Somalia	0–2	Zimbabwe	Nairobi, Kenya
16:00			Tapiwa 32'; Guthrie 47' (pen.)	Stadium: Nyayo National Stadium

5 December 2009 2009 CECAFA	Eritrea	3–1	Somalia	Nairobi, Kenya
11:00	Andberhian 15' (pen.); Tseqay 27'; Egal 60' (o.g.)		Ali 70'	Stadium: Nyayo National Stadium

=== 2010–2019 ===
27 November 2010 2010 CECAFA	Burundi	2–0	Somalia	Dar es Salaam, Tanzania
14:00 UTC+03:00	Nahimana 18'; Habarugira 72'			Stadium: Benjamin Mkapa National Stadium

30 November 2010 2010 CECAFA	Tanzania	3–0	Somalia	Dar es Salaam, Tanzania
16:00 UTC+03:00	Shindika 41' (pen.); Bocco 76'; Bakari 89'			Stadium: Benjamin Mkapa National Stadium

3 December 2010 2010 CECAFA	Somalia	0–6	Zambia	Dar es Salaam, Tanzania
14:00 UTC+03:00			Sunzu 25', 27', 43', 49' (pen.); Mukuka 28'; Mapande 81'	Stadium: Benjamin Mkapa National Stadium

1 November 2011 Friendly	Djibouti	1–0	Somalia	Djibouti
	?

12 November 2011 2014 WCQ	Somalia	0–0	Ethiopia	Djibouti City, Djibouti
15:45 UTC+3		Report		Stadium: El Hadj Hassan Gouled Aptidon Stadium; Attendance: 3,000; Referee: Mohamed Hassan Ourouke (Djibouti)

16 November 2011 2014 WCQ	Ethiopia	5–0 (5–0 agg.)	Somalia	Addis Ababa, Ethiopia
16:00 UTC+3	Oumed O. 5'; Shimelis B. 62', 65'; Getaneh K. 87', 90+2'	Report		Stadium: Addis Ababa Stadium; Attendance: 22,000; Referee: Med Said Kordi (Tunisia)

25 November 2011 2011 CECAFA	Burundi	4–1	Somalia	Dar es Salaam, Tanzania
14:00	Ndayisaba 30'; Papy 45'; Amissi 54'; Ndayisenga 86'	Report	Ali 90+2' (pen.)	Stadium: Benjamin Mkapa National Stadium

28 November 2011 2011 CECAFA	Somalia	0–4	Uganda	Dar es Salaam, Tanzania
16:00		Report	Wagaluka 48'; Okwi 61', 76', 90'	Stadium: Chamazi Stadium

1 December 2011 2011 CECAFA	Somalia	0–3	Zanzibar	Dar es Salaam, Tanzania
14:00		Report	Selemba 8'; Omar 51'; Morris 87'	Stadium: Benjamin Mkapa National Stadium; Referee: Hudu Munyemana (Rwanda)

25 November 2012 2012 CECAFA	Burundi	5–1	Somalia	Kampala, Uganda
16:00 UTC+3	Nduwarugira 34', 84'; Y. Ndikumana 41'; S. Ndikumana 78', 88'; Nduwimana (yellow card) 51'	Report 1 Report 2	Mohammed 51' (pen.)	Stadium: Mandela National Stadium; Referee: Ali Kalyango (Uganda)

28 November 2012 2012 CECAFA	Somalia	0–1	Sudan	Kampala, Uganda
16:00 UTC+3		Report 1 Report 2	M. Mohammed (yellow card) 43'; F. Abdallah (yellow card) 63'; S. Abdullah (yellow card) 75'; F. Mohammed 85'	Stadium: Mandela National Stadium; Referee: Mensur Maeruf (Eritrea)

1 December 2012 2012 CECAFA	Somalia	0–7	Tanzania	Kampala, Uganda
14:00 UTC+3		Report	Ngassa 1', 23', 44', 73', 75'; Bocco 26', 42'	Stadium: Lugogo Stadium; Referee: Ronnie Kalema (Uganda)

28 November 2013 2013 CECAFA	Burundi	2–0	Somalia	Machakos, Kenya
14:00	Nduwarugira 41'; Abdul Razak 54'	Report		Stadium: Kenyatta Stadium; Referee: Luleseghed Ghebremichael (Eritrea)

1 December 2013 2013 CECAFA	Somalia	0–1	Tanzania	Nairobi, Kenya
14:00	Hayow (yellow card) 33'; Mohammed (yellow card) 41'	Report	Chanongo 57'; Moradi (yellow card) 81'	Stadium: Nyayo National Stadium; Referee: Kheirala Murtaz (Sudan)

4 December 2013 2013 CECAFA	Somalia	0–4	Zambia	Nakuru, Kenya
16:00		Report	Mwape 2', 55'; Mbewe 4', 70'; Kabwe (yellow card) 33'	Stadium: Afraha Stadium; Referee: Anthony Ogwayo (Kenya)

9 October 2015 2018 WCQ	Somalia	0–2	Niger	Addis Ababa, Ethiopia
15:30 UTC+3		Report (FIFA); Report (CAF)	Maâzou 58', 61' (pen.)	Stadium: Addis Ababa Stadium; Attendance: 5,000; Referee: Haithem Kossaï (Tunisia)

13 October 2015 2018 WCQ	Niger	4–0 (6–0 agg.)	Somalia	Niamey, Niger
16:00 UTC+1	Cissé 13', 67'; Maâzou 18', 32'	Report (FIFA); Report (CAF)		Stadium: Stade Général Seyni Kountché; Attendance: 7,000; Referee: Falou Galasse Kane (Senegal)

22 November 2015 2015 CECAFA	Somalia	0–4	Tanzania	Addis Ababa, Ethiopia
14:00		Report	Bocco 11' (pen.), 55'; Maguli 17', 53'	Stadium: Addis Ababa Stadium

25 November 2015 2015 CECAFA	Somalia	0–2	Ethiopia	Hawassa, Ethiopia
16:00		Report	Nasser 14'; Girma 82'	Stadium: Hawassa International Stadium

27 November 2015 2015 CECAFA	Rwanda	3–0	Somalia	Hawassa, Ethiopia
14:00	Habimana 6'; Tuyisenge 52'; Ngomirakiza 58'	Report		Stadium: Hawassa International Stadium

22 April 2017 2018 CHANQ	Somalia	1–2	South Sudan	Djibouti City, Djibouti (Note: Somalia played their home leg in Djibouti due to the Somali Civil War.)
16:00 EAT	Mohamed 49'	Report	Moga 6'; Khamis 52'	Stadium: El Hadj Hassan Gouled Aptidon Stadium; Referee: Mfaume Ali Nassoro (Tanzania)

30 April 2017 2018 CHANQ	South Sudan	2–0 (4–1 agg.)	Somalia	Juba, South Sudan
16:30 EAT	Wurube 53'; Moga 69'	Report		Stadium: Juba Stadium; Referee: Brian Miiro (Uganda

22 July 2019 Friendly	Djibouti	1–0	Somalia	Djibouti City, Djibouti
15:00 UTC+3	Mahabeh 59'	Report		Stadium: National Stadium; Attendance: El Hadj Hassan Gouled Aptidon Stadium

5 September 2019 2022 FWC Q	Somalia	1–0	Zimbabwe	Djibouti City, Djibouti
18:00 CAT	Shakunda 86'	Report		Stadium: El Hadj Hassan Gouled Aptidon Stadium; Attendance: 4,000; Referee: Alfred Pousri Armi (Chad)

10 September 2019 2022 FWC Q	Zimbabwe	3–1 (3–2 agg.)	Somalia	Harare, Zimbabwe
15:00 CAT	Munetsi 77'; Muskwe 86'; Billiat 90'	Report	Mohamed 85'	Stadium: National Sports Stadium; Referee: Andofetra Rakotojaona (Madagascar)

7 December 2019 2019 CECAFA	Djibouti	0–0	Somalia	Kampala, Uganda
11:30 UTC+3		Report		Stadium: Lugogo Stadium; Referee: Thierry Nkurunziza (Burundi)

9 December 2019 2019 CECAFA	Somalia	0–2	Uganda	Kampala, Uganda
14:00 UTC+3		Report	Okello 28', 67'	Stadium: Lugogo Stadium; Referee: Mohamed Diraneh Guedi (Djibouti)

13 December 2019 2019 CECAFA	Burundi	0–1	Somalia	Kampala, Uganda
14:00 UTC+3		Report	Mohamed 40'	Stadium: StarTimes Stadium; Referee: Sabri Mohamed Fadul (Sudan)

15 December 2019 2019 CECAFA	Somalia	0–0	Eritrea	Kampala, Uganda
11:30 UTC+3		Report		Stadium: Lugogo Stadium; Referee: Anthony Ogwayo (Kenya)

=== 2020–present ===
15 June 2021 Friendly	Djibouti	1–0	Somalia	Djibouti City, Djibouti
19:00 UTC+3	Akimbinou 31'	Report		Stadium: El Hadj Hassan Gouled Aptidon Stadium; Attendance: 10,000; Referee: Souleiman Ahmed Djama (Djibouti)

20 June 2021 2021 FIFA Arab Cup Q	Oman	2–1	Somalia	Doha, Qatar
20:00 UTC+3	Al-Ghassani 12'; Al-Yahyaei 36' (pen.)	Report	Gigli 54'	Stadium: Jassim bin Hamad Stadium; Referee: Benoît Bastien (France)

23 March 2022 2023 AFCON Q	Somalia	0–3	Eswatini	Dar es Salaam, Tanzania
16:00 UTC+3			Dlamini 23'; Mamba 64'; Gamedze 64'	Stadium: National Stadium; Referee: Ring Nyier Akech Malong (South Sudan)

27 March 2022 2023 AFCON Q	Eswatini	2–1 (5–1 agg.)	Somalia	Manzini, Eswatini
17:00 UTC+3	Ndzinisa 46'; Mamba 56'		Hassan 90'	Stadium: Mavuso Sports Centre; Referee: Retselisitsoe Molise (Lesotho)
Note: Eswatini won 5–1 on aggregate.

23 July 2022 2022 CHAN Q	Somalia	0–1	Tanzania	Dar es Salaam, Tanzania
16:00 UTC+3			Suleiman 46'	Stadium: National Stadium

30 July 2022 2022 CHAN Q	Tanzania	2–1 (3–1 agg.)	Somalia	Dar es Salaam, Tanzania
16:00 UTC+3	Suleiman 34'; Job 64'		Ahmed 47'	Stadium: National Stadium

14 October 2023 Friendly	Somalia	0–3	Niger	Berrechid, Morocco
16:30 UTC+1			Amoustapha 9'; A. Wonkoye 26' (pen.); Goumey 74'	Stadium: Berrechid Municipal Stadium; Referee: Rédouane Jiyed (Morocco)

17 October 2023 Friendly	Somalia	0–2	Sierra Leone	Berrechid, Morocco
19:30 UTC+1			Turay 26' (pen.), 59'	Stadium: Berrechid Municipal Stadium; Referee: Hamza El Fariq (Morocco)

16 November 2023 2026 FIFA World Cup Q	Algeria	3–1	Somalia	Algiers, Algeria
15:00 UTC+2	Abdi 2' (o.g.); Bounedjah 31'; Slimani 80'	Report	Ahmed 65'	Stadium: Nelson Mandela Stadium; Referee: Boubou Traore (Mali)

21 November 2023 2026 FIFA World Cup Q	Somalia	0–1	Uganda	Berkane, Morocco
14:00 UTC+1		Report	Mato 4'	Stadium: Stade Municipal de Berkane; Referee: Pedro Ndong Ovono Obono (Equatorial Guinea)

20 March 2024 2025 AFCON Q	Somalia	0–3	Eswatini	El Jadida, Morocco
		Report	Figuareido 33'; Ndzinisa 45+3'; Thwala 56'	Stadium: Ben M'Hamed El Abdi Stadium; Referee: Andre Kolissala Mbangui (Central African Republic)

26 March 2024 2025 AFCON Q	Eswatini	2–2 (5–2 agg.)	Somalia	Mbombela, South Africa
	Ndzinisa 46'; Matsebula 49'	Report	Awad 76'; Yusuf Ali 84'	Stadium: Mbombela Stadium; Referee: Joseph Odey Ogabor (Nigeria)
Note: Eswatini won 5–2 on aggregate.

7 June 2024 2026 FIFA World Cup Q	Mozambique	2–1	Somalia	Maputo, Mozambique
15:00 UTC+2	Amade 14'; Ratifo 29'	Report	Shirwa 66'	Stadium: Estádio do Zimpeto; Attendance: 41,000; Referee: Tsegay Mogos Teklu (Eritrea)

10 June 2024 2026 FIFA World Cup Q	Somalia	1–3	Botswana	Maputo, Mozambique
15:00 UTC+2	Hassan 74'	Report	Sesinyi 10'; Gaolaolwe 53'; Seakanyeng 72'	Stadium: Estádio do Zimpeto; Referee: Emmanuel Mensah (Liberia)

21 March 2025 2026 FIFA World Cup Q	Guinea	0–0	Somalia	Abidjan, Ivory Coast
21:00 UTC+0		Report (FIFA); Report (CAF)		Stadium: Alassane Ouattara Stadium; Referee: Andofetra Rakotojaona (Madagascar)

25 March 2025 2026 FIFA World Cup Q	Botswana	2–0	Somalia	Francistown
15:00 UTC+2	Mohutsiwa 74'; Johnson 83'	Report (FIFA); Report (CAF)		Stadium: Obed Itani Chilume Stadium; Referee: Joseph Ogabor (Nigeria)

5 September 2025 2026 FIFA World Cup Q	Somalia	0–3	Guinea	Kampala, Uganda
15:00 UTC+3		Report	Guirassy 22'; Othman 64' (o.g.); O. Camara 90+6'	Stadium: Mandela National Stadium; Referee: Tanguy Mebiame (Gabon)

8 September 2025 2026 FIFA World Cup Q	Uganda	2–0	Somalia	Kampala
19:00 UTC+3	Okello 6' (pen.); Ssemugabi 39'	Report		Stadium: Mandela National Stadium; Referee: Kalilou Ibrahim Traoré (Ivory Coast)

9 October 2025 2026 FIFA World Cup Q	Somalia	0–3	Algeria	Oran, Algeria
17:00 UTC+1		Report	Amoura 7', 57'; Mahrez 19'	Stadium: Miloud Hadefi Stadium; Referee: Godfrey Nkhakananga (Malawi)

14 October 2025 2026 FIFA World Cup Q	Somalia	0–1	Mozambique	Oran, Algeria
17:00 UTC+1		Report	Catamo 6'	Stadium: Miloud Hadefi Stadium; Referee: Ahmed Abdulrazg (Libya)

17 November 2025 Friendly	Bahrain	1–2	Somalia	Riffa, Bahrain
18:30 UTC+3	Al-Romaihi 35'	Report	Omar 45'; Marsis 80'	Stadium: Bahrain National Stadium; Referee: Saud Al-Samhan (Kuwait)

26 November 2025 2025 FIFA Arab Cup Q	Oman	0–0 (4–1 p)	Somalia	Doha, Qatar
16:00 UTC+3		Report		Stadium: Abdullah Bin Khalifa Stadium; Attendance: 3,957; Referee: Juan Calderón (Costa Rica)
	Penalties
	Al-Busaidi (penalty scored); Al-Rawahi (penalty scored); Al-Yahyaei (penalty scored); Al-Ghafri (penalty scored)		(penalty missed) S. Hassan; (penalty scored) M. Omar; (penalty missed) Musse

27 March 2026 2027 AFCON Q	Somalia	0–0	Mauritius	Matola, Mozambique
15:00 UTC+2		Report		Stadium: Arena Lalgy Tchumene; Referee: Kouassi Biro (Ivory Coast)

31 March 2026 2027 AFCON Q	Mauritius	0–0 (0–0 agg.) (2–4 p)	Somalia	Saint Pierre, Mauritius
19:00 UTC+4		Report		Stadium: Côte d'Or National Sports Complex; Referee: Ali Brahamou Sadou (Niger)
	Penalties
	Rose (penalty scored); Alizart (penalty missed); Ferré (penalty scored); Perticots (penalty missed)		Awad (penalty scored); Akram (penalty scored); Sharif (penalty scored); Suleiman (penalty scored)

== See also ==
- Somalia national football team
- Sport in Somalia
