= 2009 CECAFA Cup =

2009 CECAFA Senior Challenge Cup
- 2009 CECAFA Senior Challenge Cup Logo

Tournament details
- Host country: Kenya
- Dates: 28 November – 13 December
- Teams: 12 (from 2 confederations)
- Venues: 2 (in 2 host cities)

Final positions
- Champions: Uganda (11th title)
- Runners-up: Rwanda
- Third place: Zanzibar
- Fourth place: Tanzania

Tournament statistics
- Matches played: 26
- Goals scored: 58 (2.23 per match)
- Top scorer(s): (Tanzania) Mrisho Ngassa (5 goals)

The 2009 Orange CECAFA Senior Challenge tournament was the 33rd edition of the CECAFA Cup football tournament that involves teams from East and Central Africa. The 2009 edition was hosted in Kenya.

== Participants ==
- Burundi
- Djibouti
- Eritrea
- Ethiopia
- Kenya
- Rwanda
- Somalia
- Tanzania
- Uganda
- Zanzibar
- Zambia (Note: Invited as guest)
- Zimbabwe

== Information ==
Tembo the Elephant

Location of stadiums used in 2009 CECAFA Cup

Sudan was left out due to missing the deadline for the draw.

French telecommunications company Orange agreed to sponsor the tournament. Orange paid US$175,000 for the privilege.

The Kenyan Government also paid US$80,000 to sponsor the tournament. It is the first time in 15 years that the CECAFA Cup has been hosted in Kenya.

CECAFA unveiled tournament mascot Tembo, a friendly looking elephant in a black and yellow-striped jersey and orange shorts, standing with his left foot on a football. Tembo will spread the message "Uniting for Peace", the tournament's theme.

Television rights were sold to Kenya Broadcasting Corporation in partnership with South-African owned Super Sport.

== Group stage ==
- All times are East Africa Time (EAT) – UTC+3

=== Group A ===
Team	Pld	W	D	L	GF	GA	GD	Pts
Zambia	3	3	0	0	9	0	+9	9
Kenya	3	2	0	1	4	2	+2	6
Ethiopia	3	1	0	2	5	3	+2	3
Djibouti	3	0	0	3	0	13	−13	0

28 November 2009
16:00

Zambia	2–0	Kenya
Chamanga 86', 89'

Nyayo National Stadium, Nairobi
30 November 2009
16:00

Djibouti	0–5	Ethiopia
		Ayenew 50'; Girma 60'; Tesfaye 65'; Ukuri 70', 85'

Nyayo National Stadium, Nairobi

2 December 2009
16:00

Kenya	2–0	Djibouti
Odhiambo 23'; Wanga 44'

Nyayo National Stadium, Nairobi
2 December 2009
14:00

Ethiopia	0–1	Zambia
		Chamanga 30'

Nyayo National Stadium, Nairobi

4 December 2009
14:00

Zambia	6–0	Djibouti
Chola 3', 49', 85'; Sunzu 31'; Siyingwa 65', 81'

Nyayo National Stadium, Nairobi
5 December 2009
16:00

Ethiopia	0–2	Kenya
		Baraza 2'; Wanga 52'

Nyayo National Stadium, Nairobi

=== Group B ===
Team	Pld	W	D	L	GF	GA	GD	Pts
Rwanda	3	3	0	0	4	1	+3	9
Eritrea	3	1	1	1	4	3	+1	4
Zimbabwe	3	1	1	1	2	1	+1	4
Somalia	3	0	0	3	1	6	−5	0

29 November 2009
16:00

Somalia	0–1	Rwanda
		Bader 4' (o.g.)

Nyayo National Stadium, Nairobi
1 December 2009
16:00

Zimbabwe	0–0	Eritrea

Nyayo National Stadium, Nairobi

3 December 2009
14:00

Eritrea	1–2	Rwanda
Goitom 85'		Ndayishimiye 15'; Wolday 35' (o.g.)

Nyayo National Stadium, Nairobi
3 December 2009
16:00

Somalia	0–2	Zimbabwe
		Tapiwa 32'; Guthrie 47' (pen.)

Nyayo National Stadium, Nairobi

5 December 2009
11:00

Eritrea	3–1	Somalia
Andberhian 15' (pen.); Tseqay 27'; Egal 60' (o.g.)		Ali 70'

Nyayo National Stadium, Nairobi
5 December 2009
13:00

Zimbabwe	0–1	Rwanda
		Ndayishimiye 10'

Nyayo National Stadium, Nairobi

=== Group C ===
Team	Pld	W	D	L	GF	GA	GD	Pts
Uganda	3	2	1	0	4	0	+4	7
Tanzania	3	2	0	1	2	2	0	6
Zanzibar	3	1	1	1	4	1	+3	4
Burundi	3	0	0	3	0	7	−7	0

29 November 2009
14:00

Zanzibar	4–0	Burundi
Morris 16'; Hakizimana 18' (o.g.); Kassim 25'; Mbazumutima 67' (o.g.)

Mumias Sports Complex, Mumias
29 November 2009
16:00

Tanzania	0–2	Uganda
		Kasule 3'; Sserumaga 88'

Mumias Sports Complex, Mumias

1 December 2009
16:00

Tanzania	1–0	Zanzibar
Ngassa 18'

Mumias Sports Complex, Mumias
2 December 2009
16:00

Burundi	0–2	Uganda
		Massa 12'; Wagaluka 67'

Mumias Sports Complex, Mumias

4 December 2009
14:00

Burundi	0–1	Tanzania
		Ngassa 48'

Mumias Sports Complex, Mumias
5 December 2009
16:00

Zanzibar	0–0	Uganda

Mumias Sports Complex, Mumias

== Knockout stage ==
- All times are East Africa Time (EAT) – UTC+3

Quarter-finals
7 December – Nairobi
Zambia	0 (3)
Zanzibar (pen.)	0 (4)
7 December – Nairobi
Uganda	1
Kenya	0
8 December – Nairobi
Tanzania	4
Eritrea	0
8 December – Nairobi
Rwanda	4
Zimbabwe	1

Semi-finals
9 December – Nairobi
Uganda	2
Zanzibar	1
10 December – Nairobi
Tanzania	1
Rwanda	2

Final
13 December – Nairobi
Uganda	2
Rwanda	0

=== Quarter-finals ===
7 December 2009

Zambia	0–0	Zanzibar
Penalties
	3–4

Nyayo National Stadium, Nairobi
7 December 2009
16:00

Uganda	1–0	Kenya
Ssentongo 64'

Nyayo National Stadium, Nairobi

8 December 2009
14:00

Tanzania	4–0	Eritrea
Bocco 62'; Ngassa 65', 78', 85'

Nyayo National Stadium, Nairobi
8 December 2009
16:00

Rwanda	4–1	Zimbabwe
Ndayishimiye 31'; Ndamuhanga 68', 78'; Niyonzima 89'		Mutizwa 7'

Nyayo National Stadium, Nairobi

=== Semi-finals ===
9 December 2009

Uganda	2–1	Zanzibar
Bengo 4'; Hamoud 11' (o.g.)		Abdulghani 74'

Nyayo National Stadium, Nairobi
10 December 2009

Tanzania	1–2	Rwanda
Mugosi 82'		Ndayishimiye 59'; Mutesa 79'

Nyayo National Stadium, Nairobi

=== Third place play-off ===
13 December 2009

Zanzibar	1–0	Tanzania
Kassim 70'

Nyayo National Stadium, Nairobi

=== Final ===
13 December 2009

Uganda	2–0	Rwanda
Wagaluka 40'; Okwi 73'

Nyayo National Stadium, Nairobi

2009 CECAFA Cup winners

Uganda
Eleventh title

== Eritreans seek refugee status ==
Following Eritrea's exit from the competition, the Eritrean national football team sought refugee status in Nairobi and then leave to Australia.

== Goalscorers ==
5 goals

- (Tanzania) Mrisho Ngassa

4 goals

- (Rwanda) Yusuf Ndayishime

3 goals

- (Zambia) James Chamanga
- (Zambia) Kennedy Chola

2 goals

- (Ethiopia) Umed Ukuri
- (Kenya) Allan Wanga
- (Rwanda) Tumayine Ndamuhanga
- (Uganda) Dan Wagaluka
- (Zambia) Charles Siyingwa

1 goal

- (Eritrea) Isaias Andberhian
- (Eritrea) Testfaldet Goitom
- (Eritrea) Filmon Tseqay
- (Ethiopia) Aklilu Ayenew
- (Ethiopia) Adane Girma
- (Ethiopia) Tefesse Tesfaye
- (Kenya) John Baraza
- (Kenya) George Odhiambo
- (Rwanda) Haruna Niyonzima
- (Rwanda) Mafisango Mutesa
- (Somalia) Mohamed Hassan Ali
- (Tanzania) Musa Mugosi
- (Uganda) Stephen Bengo
- (Uganda) Owen Kasule
- (Uganda) Geoffrey Massa
- (Uganda) Emmanuel Okwi
- (Uganda) Mike Sserumaga
- (Uganda) Robert Ssentongo
- (Zambia) Felix Sunzu
- (Zanzibar) Abdulla Abdulghani
- (Zanzibar) Abdi Kassim
- (Zanzibar) Aggrey Morris
- (Zimbabwe) Mangezi Tapiwa
- (Zimbabwe) Zhokinyi Guthrie
- (Zimbabwe) Lionel Mutizwa

Own goal

- (Burundi) Hassan Hakizimana (for Zanzibar)
- (Burundi) Henry Mbazumutima (for Zanzibar)
- (Eritrea) Ermias Wolday (for Rwanda)
- (Somalia) Moalim Bader (for Rwanda)
- (Somalia) Yassin Ali Egal (for Eritrea)
- (Zanzibar) Abdoulahi Hamoud (for Uganda)
