= Eritrea women's national football team results =

The Eritrea women's national football team is the representative women's association football team of Eritrea. Its governing body is the Eritrean National Football Federation (ENFF) and it competes as a member of the Confederation of African Football (CAF).

The team made its international debut in 2002, during the 2002 African Women's Championship qualification rounds, where they were drawn to face Tanzania in a two-legged match. On the 10th of August 2002, Eritrea played its first official match, losing 2-3 to Tanzania. In the second leg, the team earned a draw, showing improvement. Eritrea is currently unranked in the FIFA Women's World Rankings after being inactive for more than 18 months. Eritrea played the majority of its matches against Tanzania.

== Record per opponent ==
Key

Positive balance (more wins than losses)
Neutral balance (as many wins as losses)
Negative balance (more losses than wins)

The following table shows Eritrea' all-time official international record per opponent:

Opponent	Pld	W	D	L	GF	GA	GD	W%	Confederation
Burundi	2	0	0	2	0	6	-6	00.00	CAF
Morocco	2	1	0	1	4	4	0	50.00	CAF
Tanzania	8	0	3	5	11	25	-14	00.00	CAF
Total	12	1	3	8	15	35	-20	08.33	—

== Results ==
=== 2002 ===
10 August 2002 2002 African Women's Championship qualification First round 1st leg	Eritrea	2–3	Tanzania	Asmara, Eritrea
	Mebrahtu 3'; Debessay 47'	Report	Kavena 20'; Paul 31'; Chambruma 45'	Referee: Constance Adipo (Uganda)

24 August 2002 2002 African Women's Championship qualification First round 2nd leg	Tanzania	2–2 (5–4 agg.)	Eritrea	Dar es Salaam, Tanzania
	Mosi 54'; Chambruma 89'	Report	Tekeste 7'; Bereket-ab 17'	Referee: Viviana Mbula Mukulu (DR Congo)
Note: Tanzania won 5–4 on aggregate.

=== 2004 ===
29 May 2004 2004 African Women's Championship qualification First round 1st leg	Tanzania	4–0	Eritrea	Dar es Salaam, Tanzania
	Mtumwa 2', 7', 10'; Yusuf 14'	Report		Referee: Jane Silungwe (Malawi)

12 June 2004 2004 African Women's Championship qualification First round 2nd leg	Eritrea	1–1 (5–1 agg.)	Tanzania	Asmara, Eritrea
		Report
Note: Tanzania won 5–1 on aggregate.

=== 2006 ===
2006 African Women's Championship qualification First round 1st leg	Eritrea	Cancelled	Egypt	Eritrea

2006 African Women's Championship qualification First round 2nd leg	Egypt	Cancelled	Eritrea	Egypt

Football at the 2008 Summer Olympics – qualification Preliminary round 1st leg	Uganda	Cancelled	Eritrea	Uganda

Football at the 2008 Summer Olympics – qualification Preliminary round 2nd leg	Eritrea	Cancelled	Uganda	Eritrea
Note: Eritrea won on walkover and advanced to the second round after Uganda withdrew.

=== 2007 ===
10 March 2007 Football at the 2008 Summer Olympics – qualification First round 1st leg	Eritrea	3–2	Morocco	Eritrea
		Report

24 March 2007 Football at the 2008 Summer Olympics – qualification First round 2nd leg	Morocco	2–1 (4–4 agg.)	Eritrea	Morocco
		Report
Note: 4–4 on aggregate. Morocco won on away goals.

30 November 2007 2008 African Women's Championship qualification First round 1st leg	Eritrea	2–3	Tanzania	Eritrea
		Report

16 December 2007 2008 African Women's Championship qualification First round 2nd leg	Tanzania	1–0 (4–2 agg.)	Eritrea	Tanzania
		Report
Note: Tanzania won 4–2 on aggregate.

=== 2010 ===
2010 African Women's Championship qualification First round 1st leg	Eritrea	Cancelled	Kenya	Eritrea

2010 African Women's Championship qualification First round 2nd leg	Kenya	Cancelled	Eritrea	Kenya

23 May 2010 2010 African Women's Championship qualification Second round 1st leg	Tanzania	8–1	Eritrea	Dar es Salaam, Tanzania
16:00 UTC+3	Shurua 6', 27', 64', 80'; Mwasikili 19'; Rashidi 21', 60', 74'	Report	Ghebresa 90'	Stadium: Uhuru Stadium; Referee: Nabikko Ssemmambo (Uganda)

5 June 2010 2010 African Women's Championship qualification Second round 2nd leg	Eritrea	3–3 (4–11 agg.)	Tanzania	Asmara, Eritrea
	Mehari 1'; Zerihani 48', 52'	Report	Rashidi 76', 78', 88'	Stadium: Cicero Stadium; Referee: Damaris Kimani (Kenya)
Note: Tanzania won 11–4 on aggregate.

=== 2021 ===
20 October 2021 2022 AFWCON qualification First round 1st leg	Eritrea	0–5	Burundi	Asmara, Eritrea
20:00 UTC+2		Report		Stadium: Denden Stadium

26 October 2021 2022 AFWCON qualification First round 2nd leg	Burundi	1–0 (6–0 agg.)	Eritrea	Ngozi, Burundi
20:00 UTC+2	Bukuru 45'	Report		Stadium: Stade Urukundo
Note: Burundi won 6–0 on aggregate.

== See also ==
- Eritrea national football team results
