= Sserunkuma =

Sserunkuma is a surname. Notable people with the surname include:

- Dan Sserunkuma (born 1993), Ugandan footballer
- Geoffrey Sserunkuma (born 1983), Ugandan footballer
- Simon Sserunkuma (born 1991), Ugandan footballer
