= Kalungi =

Kalungi is a surname. Notable people with the surname include:

- Edward Kalungi (born 1977), Ugandan footballer
- Henry Kalungi (born 1987), Ugandan footballer
