= Filmon =

Filmon may refer to:

- FilmOn, internet television provider
- Filmon Ghirmai (born 1979), long-distance runner
- Filmon Tseqay, footballer
- Gary Filmon, (born 1942), politician
