= Ahmed Abdelsalam Qura =

Ahmad Abdel Salam Qura
- احمد عبدالسلام قورة
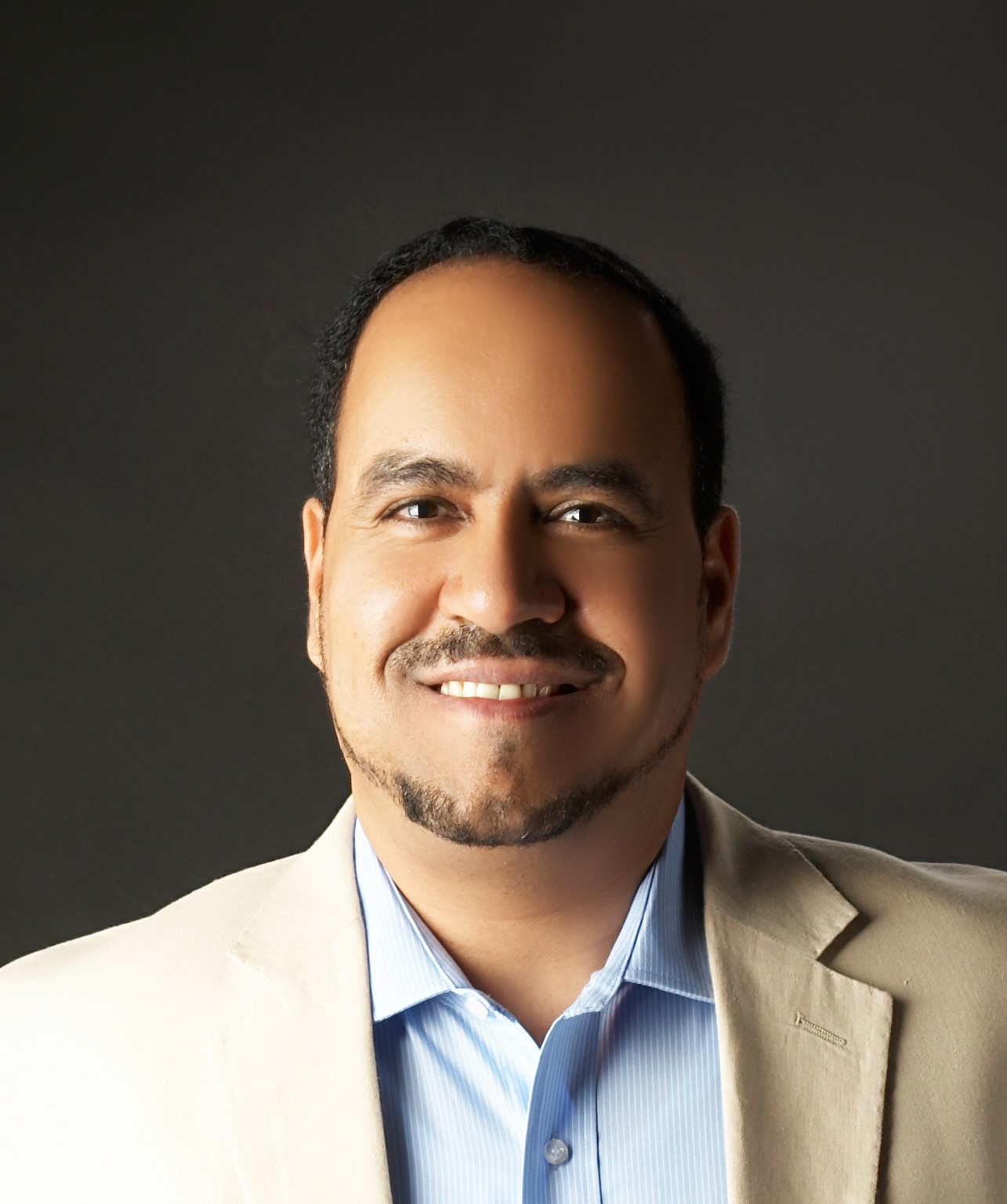

Member of the House of Representatives
- Constituency: Sohag Governorate

Personal details
- Born: January 1964 (age 62) Sohag Governorate, Egypt
- Party: Nation's Future Party
- Education: Al-Azhar University
- Occupation: Politician, businessman

Ahmed Abdelsalam Qura (Arabic: احمد عبدالسلام قورة) is an Egyptian businessman and politician, born in 1964 in the city of Dar El Salam, affiliated with the Sohag Governorate in Egypt. He obtained a Bachelor’s degree in Arabic Language from the Department of Journalism and Media at Al-Azhar University.

He was raised in a traditional Egyptian environment and moved with his father during childhood to Kuwait, where he began his professional life at an early age.

== Education ==
Qura studied in Egyptian schools before moving to Kuwait, where he completed his education. He obtained a Bachelor’s degree in Arabic Language from Al-Azhar University, specializing in journalism and media.

== Professional life ==
He traveled to the State of Kuwait in 1973, but his professional life began in the 1980s, where he worked in various fields before expanding into the investment sector. He founded several companies operating in the fields of agricultural reclamation, contracting, and construction, including the Egyptian-Kuwaiti Company for Development and Investment, which was established in 1998 with the aim of reclaiming agricultural land.

Qura began his career in Kuwait, working in craft and trade fields from a young age. After the liberation of Kuwait in 1991, he established several companies with Kuwaiti partners in the fields of contracting, services, and industry. His activities later expanded to include real estate development, investment in banks, trade, petroleum services, and fisheries.

== Political life in Egypt ==
His political career began in 2005, when he was elected as a member of the Egyptian House of Representatives, representing the Dar El Salam constituency in the Sohag Governorate.

He is a member of the Transportation and Communications Committee in the House and also a member of the parliamentary bloc of the Homeland Protectors Party (Homat El Watan).

== Allegations and cases ==
Qura faced several political and financial cases that stirred controversy, according to the Kuwaiti newspaper *Al-Rai* and the Egyptian newspaper *Tahya Misr*. These cases were centered around his presence between Egypt and Kuwait at the time.

=== State of Kuwait ===
==== Legal dispute with Saud Bader Al-Naqi ====
A legal dispute occurred between Qura and Saud Al-Naqi, who was then the general manager and a close friend of Qura. According to Qura, Al-Naqi exploited the trust between them and seized two plots of land in the Bayan area, along with a 5,000 square meter chalet in the Al-Zour area. Qura obtained final rulings from the Kuwaiti Court of Cassation for compensation and the return of those funds.

==== Accusation by Saud Bader Al-Naqi against Qura ====
Saud Al-Naqi accused Ahmed Qura of forgery and seizing shares in one of the companies, as well as attempting to manipulate results and documents. Qura denied the accusations, stating that no binding judicial ruling was issued against him. This was also refuted by Tarek Al-Sultan, Al-Naqi’s deputy at the time, according to his statement and remarks.

=== Arab Republic of Egypt ===
Qura faced several accusations related to seizing state-owned lands and making illicit profits by converting the use of land allocated for agricultural reclamation to urban development. As a result, an arrest warrant was issued against him in 2016. He was later released from investigations by the Public Funds Prosecution on bail of 100,000 EGP after being questioned.

On June 7, 2021, the Egyptian Court of Cassation upheld the acquittal of Qura and former Minister of Irrigation Mohamed Nasr Allam—one of the main defendants in the case—from the charge of facilitating the seizure of lands in the Al-Ayyat region, after the prosecution had appealed the case in 2018.
