= Jérémy Villeneuve =

Footballer (born 1994)

Personal information
- Date of birth: 25 April 1994 (age 32)
- Place of birth: Paris, France
- Height: 1.65 m (5 ft 5 in)
- Position: Midfielder

Team information
- Current team: Victoria Rosport
- Number: 93

Youth career
- 2007–2010: INF Clairefontaine

Senior career*
Years	Team	Apps	(Gls)
2010–2011	Strasbourg B		
2011–2012	Guingamp B		
2012–2014	Reims B	20	(3)
2014–2016	Drancy	49	(4)
2016–2018	Ivry	37	(11)
2018–2019	Le Puy	20	(1)
2019–2022	Bourges	12	(1)
2021–2022	Andrézieux	25	(4)
2022–2025	Créteil-Lusitanos	42	(3)
2026–	Victoria Rosport	10	(1)

International career^{‡}
2017–	Mauritius	29	(2)
- * Club domestic league appearances and goals as of 13 June 2026 ‡ National team caps and goals as of 16 June 2026

Jérémy Villeneuve (born 25 April 1994) is a professional footballer who plays as a midfielder for Luxembourg National Division club Victoria Rosport. Born in France, he plays for the Mauritius national team.

== Career ==
Born in Paris, Villeneuve has played for INF Clairefontaine, Strasbourg B, Guingamp B, Reims B, Drancy, Ivry and Le Puy.

He made his international debut for Mauritius in 2017.

=== International goals ===
Scores and results list Mauritius's goal tally first.

No.	Date	Venue	Opponent	Score	Result	Competition
1.	11 June 2023	Cote d'Or National Sports Complex, Saint Pierre, Mauritius	Pakistan	1–0	3–0	2023 Mauritius Four Nations Cup
2.	26 March 2024	Cote d'Or National Sports Complex, Saint Pierre, Mauritius	Chad	1–0	1–2	2025 Africa Cup of Nations qualification
