= Football at the 1973 All-Africa Games – Men's qualification =

The men's qualification for football tournament at the 1973 All-Africa Games.

== Qualification ==
=== Zone I (North Africa) ===
Algeria qualified by default. Libya, Morocco and Tunisia withdrew.

=== Zone II (West Africa 1) ===
The tournament was held in Dakar, Senegal. The tournament was also the second edition of the Tournoi de la Zone II.

Team	Pld	W	D	L	GF	GA	GD	Pts
Guinea	4	4	0	0	29	5	+24	8
Senegal	4	2	1	1	20	6	+14	5
Gambia	4	2	0	2	6	16	–10	4
Mali	4	1	1	2	16	8	+8	3
Mauritania	4	0	0	4	1	37	–36	0

28 September 1972

Guinea	8–0	Gambia

Dakar
28 September 1972

Senegal	10–1	Mauritania

Dakar

1 October 1972

Senegal	2–3	Guinea

Dakar
1 October 1972

Mali	11–0	Mauritania

Dakar

3 October 1972

Guinea	14–0	Mauritania

Dakar
3 October 1972

Gambia	3–1	Mali

Dakar

5 October 1972

Gambia	2–0	Mauritania

Dakar
5 October 1972

Senegal	1–1	Mali

Dakar

8 October 1972

Guinea	4–3	Mali

Dakar
8 October 1972

Senegal	7–1	Gambia

Dakar

Guinea qualified.

=== Zone III (West Africa 2) ===
The tournament was held in Ghana.

Team	Pld	W	D	L	GF	GA	GD	Pts
Ghana	3	2	1	0	3	1	+2	5
Ivory Coast	3	1	1	1	1	1	0	3
Sierra Leone	3	0	2	1	2	3	–1	2
Liberia	3	0	2	1	1	2	–1	2

23 September 1972

Ghana	1–1	Sierra Leone

Accra
24 September 1972

Ivory Coast	0–0	Liberia

Accra

26 September 1972

Ghana	1–0	Liberia

Kumasi
27 September 1972

Ivory Coast	1–0	Sierra Leone

Accra

29 September 1972

Liberia	1–1	Sierra Leone

Kumasi
30 September 1972

Ghana	1–0	Ivory Coast

Accra

Ghana qualified.

=== Zone IV (West Africa 3) ===
The tournament was held in an away/home format. Togo withdrew.

Team	Pld	W	D	L	GF	GA	GD	Pts
Upper Volta	4	3	0	1	9	5	+4	6
Dahomey	4	2	1	1	7	7	0	5
Niger	4	0	1	3	3	7	–4	1
Togo (withdrew)	0	0	0	0	0	0	0	0

17 September 1972

Upper Volta	2–0	Niger

Ouagadougou
1 October 1972

Dahomey	3–2	Upper Volta

Cotonou
15 October 1972

Niger	2–2	Dahomey

Niamey
29 October 1972

Niger	1–2	Upper Volta

Lomé^{1}
12 November 1972

Upper Volta	3–1	Dahomey

Ouagadougou
26 November 1972

Dahomey	1–0	Niger

Cotonou

^1 Match played at Lomé, Niger declined to host due to security fears.

Upper Volta qualified. Nigeria qualified automatically as host.

=== Zone V (Central Africa) ===
The tournament was held in Congo. It was also a football tournament, a part of the 1972 Central African Cup, an omnisport event. Chad's matches were not counted in the football ranking because it did not enter the other sports. Zaire withdrew the games.

Team	Pld	W	D	L	GF	GA	GD	Pts
Congo	3	2	1	0	6	1	+5	5
Central African Republic	3	2	0	1	7	6	+1	4
Cameroon	3	1	1	1	8	5	+3	3
Gabon	3	0	0	3	1	10	–9	0
Chad (results not counted)	0	0	0	0	0	0	0	0
Zaire (withdrew)	0	0	0	0	0	0	0	0

13 July 1972

Congo	7–0 (not counted)	Chad

Brazzaville
14 July 1972

Central African Republic	4–3	Cameroon

Brazzaville

16 July 1972

Chad	2–1 (not counted)	Central African Republic

Brazzaville
16 July 1972

Congo	3–0	Gabon

Brazzaville

18 July 1972

Central African Republic	3–1	Gabon

Brazzaville
18 July 1972

Cameroon	4–1 (not counted)	Chad

Brazzaville

20 July 1972

Congo	2–0	Central African Republic

Brazzaville
20 July 1972

Cameroon	4–0	Gabon

Brazzaville

22 July 1972

Gabon	1–0 (not counted)	Chad

Brazzaville
23 July 1972

Congo	1–1	Cameroon

Brazzaville

Congo qualified.

=== Zone VI (East Africa) ===
The tournament was held in Cairo, Egypt from 24 November to 1 December 1972. Ethiopia and Sudan withdrew.

Team	Pld	W	D	L	GF	GA	GD	Pts
Egypt	3	2	1	0	7	4	+3	5
Uganda	3	1	1	1	3	3	0	3
Somalia	3	1	1	1	5	6	–1	3
Kenya	3	0	1	2	2	4	–2	1
Ethiopia (withdrew)	0	0	0	0	0	0	0	0
Sudan (withdrew)	0	0	0	0	0	0	0	0

24 November 1972

Egypt	4–2	Somalia

Cairo
25 November 1972

Uganda	1–0	Kenya

Cairo

27 November 1972

Egypt	2–2	Uganda

Cairo
28 November 1972

Kenya	2–2	Somalia

Cairo

30 November 1972

Somalia	1–0	Uganda

Cairo
1 December 1972

Egypt	1–0	Kenya

Cairo

Egypt qualified.

=== Zone VII (Southern Africa) ===
The tournament was held in Dar El Salam, Tanzania. The teams Botswana, Burundi, Madagascar, Malawi, Swaziland and Zambia withdrew.

Team	Pld	W	D	L	GF	GA	GD	Pts
Tanzania	2	2	0	0	8	2	+6	4
Mauritius	2	1	0	1	5	7	–2	2
Lesotho	2	0	0	2	4	8	–4	0

6 October 1972

Tanzania	4–1	Mauritius

Dar El Salam

8 October 1972

Mauritius	4–3	Lesotho

Dar El Salam

10 October 1972

Tanzania	4–1	Lesotho

Dar El Salam

Tanzania qualified.

== Qualified teams ==
The following countries have qualified for the final tournament:

Zone	Team
Hosts	Nigeria
Zone I	Algeria
Zone II	Guinea
Zone III	Ghana
Zone IV	Upper Volta
Zone V	Congo
Zone VI	Egypt
Zone VII	Tanzania
