= 2000 COMESA Cup =

Tournament details
- Host country: Zambia
- Dates: 28-30 October 2000
- Teams: 5 (from 2 sub-confederations)
- Venue(s): 1 (in 1 host city)

Final positions
- Champions: Rwanda
- Runners-up: Zimbabwe
- Third place: Zambia

Tournament statistics
- Matches played: 5
- Goals scored: 11 (2.2 per match)

The 2000 COMESA Cup was the first and only edition of the COMESA Cup. Rwanda defeated Zimbabwe in the final to win the title. The tournament stood in place of the 2000 COSAFA Cup and was competition to the 2000 CECAFA Cup.

== History ==
The tournament, which was sponsored by Coca-Cola, was originally created by politicians from 22 member states of the Common Market for Eastern and Southern Africa (COMESA). The creation of the competition was seen as a threat to the existence of CECAFA which could potentially be replaced by COMESA's new interest in football. It was announced in July 2000 that the tournament would take place in Lusaka, Zambia where the COMESA headquarters are located.

== Qualifying ==
Originally fourteen member associations from nations who were members of COMESA were expected to participate in a qualifying tournament from 27 August to 24 September 2000. In the end, the qualifiers were cancelled and only five teams competed in the single-elimination tournament.

== Participants ==
=== Actual ===
- Eritrea
- Kenya B
- Rwanda
- Zambia
- Zimbabwe

=== Withdrew ===
- Sudan
- Burundi
- Namibia
- (Democratic Republic of the Congo) DR Congo
- Malawi
- Ethiopia
- Madagascar
- (Eswatini) Swaziland
- Mauritius

== Matches ==
The final tournament matches were originally scheduled to begin 10 October 2000 but were later pushed back to 28 October.

=== Quarter-final ===
28 October 2000

Rwanda	1–0	Eritrea
	Report

Lusaka, Zambia

=== Semi-finals ===
29 October 2000

Rwanda	2–0	Zambia
	Report

Lusaka, Zambia
29 October 2000

Zimbabwe	3–0	Kenya B
	Report

Lusaka, Zambia

=== Third place match ===
30 October 2000

Zambia	4–0	Kenya B
	Report

Lusaka, Zambia

=== Final ===
30 October 2000

Rwanda	1–0	Zimbabwe
	Report

Lusaka, Zambia
