= Patrick Mafisango =

Rwandan footballer

Personal information
- Full name: Patrick Mutesa Mafisango
- Date of birth: 9 March 1980
- Place of birth: Kinshasa, Zaire
- Date of death: 17 May 2012 (aged 32)
- Place of death: Dar es Salaam, Tanzania
- Position: Midfielder

Senior career*
Years	Team	Apps	(Gls)
- TP Mazembe
2006–2007	APR		
2007–2009	ATRACO		
2009–2010	APR		
2010–2011	Azam		
2011–2012	Simba		

International career
2006–2011	Rwanda	23	(2)
- * Club domestic league appearances and goals

Patrick Mutesa Mafisango (9 March 1980 – 17 May 2012) was a Rwandan international footballer who played as a midfielder.

== Career ==
Born in Kinshasa, Zaire, Mafisango played club football in the Congo, Rwanda and Tanzania for TP Mazembe, APR, ATRACO, Azam and Simba. He won the 2011–12 Tanzanian Premier League title with Simba, after joining from rivals Azam in May 2011.

He earned 23 caps at senior international level for Rwanda, scoring twice, between 2006 and 2011. He also appeared in ten FIFA World Cup qualifying matches.

== Death ==
He died on the way to hospital after being involved a car crash on 17 May 2012.

== Honours ==
Simba

- Ligi kuu Bara: 2011–12
