= Hassan Hakizimana =

Burundian footballer

Personal information
- Date of birth: 15 October 1990 (age 36)
- Place of birth: Bujumbura, Burundi
- Height: 1.79 m (5 ft 10 in)
- Position: Defender

Senior career*
Years	Team	Apps	(Gls)
- Atlético Olympic

International career
2007–2014	Burundi	45	(1)
- * Club domestic league appearances and goals

Hassan Hakizimana (born 26 October 1990) is a Burundian former footballer who played as a defender for Atlético Olympic FC and the Burundi national team.

== International career ==
He was called up by Lofty Naseem, the national team coach, to represent Burundi in the 2014 African Nations Championship held in South Africa.
