= Mrisho Ngasa =

Tanzanian footballer

Mrisho Khalfani Ngasa
Personal information
- Full name: Mrisho Khalfani Ngasa
- Date of birth: 5 May 1989 (age 37)
- Place of birth: Mwanza, Tanzania
- Height: 1.57 m (5 ft 2 in)
- Positions: Winger; forward

Senior career*
Years	Team	Apps	(Gls)
2005–2006	Kagera Sugar		
2007–2010	Young Africans		(56)
2010–2013	Azam		
2012–2013	→ Simba (loan)		
2013–2015	Young Africans		
2015–2016	Free State Stars	17	(0)
2016–2017	Fanja		(1)
2017–2018	Mbeya City		
2018–2020	Young Africans		
2020–2022	Ndanda		

International career
2006–2015	Tanzania	100	(25)
- * Club domestic league appearances and goals as of 21:29, 31 December 2020 (UTC)

Mrisho Khalfani Ngasa (born 5 May 1989) is a Tanzanian former professional footballer. Ngasa was known for his explosive pace, dribbling and goalscoring. He is considered one of the greatest players of all time in his country and top goalscorer of the national team.

== Club career ==
In April 2009, Ngasa was invited for a trial with English Premier League side West Ham United. On 21 May 2010, Ngassa joined Azam FC for $40,000 from Young Africans. It was the biggest transfer in Tanzanian football to date. In July 2011, Ngassa went on trial with Seattle Sounders FC of Major League Soccer, and came on as a substitute against Manchester United in a friendly match.

At the beginning of August 2012, Ngasa signed for Simba, on loan.

Following the 2012–13 Tanzanian Premier League season, after his contract with Azam FC had expired, on 20 May 2013 Ngassa signed a two-year contract with the league and cup title holders Young Africans. He became one of the top scorers of 2014 CAF Champions League with two hat-tricks making a totality of six goals.

In 2015, Ngasa signed a four-year contract with Free State Stars, a South African-based club. He then signed for Fanja in Oman. In 2016 Ngasa signed a two-year contract with Mbeya City in Tanzania. Ngasa then joined Ndanda, also in Tanzania.

== International career ==
Ngasa was the top scorer in the 2009 CECAFA Cup with five goals as Tanzania finished fourth in the tournament.

Ngasa played 100 international matches between 2006 and 2015, becoming the first Tanzanian player to achieve this feat. He also managed to score 25 goals in the process, becoming the nation's all-time top goalscorer.

== Personal life ==
Ngasa is the son of Khalfan Ngasa, a former Tanzanian international footballer who played as a midfielder. Ngassa is among of talented players in Tanzania who impressed many coaches and scouts around the world, among the famous coaches who was impressed by his talent was Gianfranco Zola, the former Chelsea and Italy national team player, who was working as the manager of West Ham United.

== Career statistics ==
=== International ===
Appearances and goals by national team and year
National team	Year	Apps	Goals
Tanzania	2006	4	1
Tanzania	2007	1	0
Tanzania	2008	7	1
Tanzania	2009	17	7
Tanzania	2010	13	3
Tanzania	2011	15	3
Tanzania	2012	15	7
Tanzania	2013	15	2
Tanzania	2014	6	0
Tanzania	2015	7	1
Total		100	25

Scores and results list Tanzania's goal tally first.

#	Date	Venue	Opponent	Score	Result	Competition
1.	1 December 2006	Addis Ababa Stadium, Addis Ababa	Djibouti	1–0	3–0	2006 CECAFA Cup
2.	11 October 2008	Uhuru Stadium, Dar es Salaam	Cape Verde	3–1	3–1	2010 FIFA World Cup qualification
3.	7 January 2009	Nakivubo Stadium, Kampala	Rwanda	1–0	2–0	2008 CECAFA Cup
4.	13 January 2009	Mandela National Stadium, Kampala	Burundi	1–0	3–2	2008 CECAFA Cup
5.	1 December 2009	Mumias Sports Complex, Mumias	Zanzibar	1–0	1–0	2009 CECAFA Cup
6.	4 December 2009	Mumias Sports Complex, Mumias	Burundi	1–0	1–0	2009 CECAFA Cup
7.	8 December 2009	Nyayo National Stadium, Nairobi	Eritrea	2–0	4–0	2009 CECAFA Cup
8.	8 December 2009	Nyayo National Stadium, Nairobi	Eritrea	3–0	4–0	2009 CECAFA Cup
9.	8 December 2009	Nyayo National Stadium, Nairobi	Eritrea	4–0	4–0	2009 CECAFA Cup
10.	3 March 2010	CCM Kirumba Stadium, Mwanza	Uganda	2–1	2–3	Friendly
11.	1 May 2010	Uhuru Stadium, Dar es Salaam	Rwanda	1–1	1–1	Friendly
12.	11 August 2010	Uhuru Stadium, Dar es Salaam	Kenya	1–1	1–1	Friendly
13.	9 February 2011	Benjamin Mkapa National Stadium, Dar es Salaam	Palestine	1–0	1–0	Friendly
14.	11 November 2011	Stade Omnisports Idriss Mahamat Ouya, N'Djamena	Chad	1–0	2–1	2014 FIFA World Cup qualification
15.	8 December 2011	Benjamin Mkapa National Stadium, Dar es Salaam	Uganda	1–0	1–3	2011 CECAFA Cup
16.	15 August 2012	Molepolole Stadium, Molepolole	Botswana	3–3	3–3	Friendly
17.	1 December 2012	Lugogo Stadium, Kampala	Somalia	1–0	7–0	2012 CECAFA Cup
18.	1 December 2012	Lugogo Stadium, Kampala	Somalia	2–0	7–0	2012 CECAFA Cup
19.	1 December 2012	Lugogo Stadium, Kampala	Somalia	5–0	7–0	2012 CECAFA Cup
20.	1 December 2012	Lugogo Stadium, Kampala	Somalia	6–0	7–0	2012 CECAFA Cup
21.	1 December 2012	Lugogo Stadium, Kampala	Somalia	7–0	7–0	2012 CECAFA Cup
22.	22 December 2012	Benjamin Mkapa National Stadium, Dar es Salaam	Zambia	1–0	1–0	Friendly
23.	7 December 2013	Mombasa Municipal Stadium, Mombasa	Uganda	1–1	2–2	2013 CECAFA Cup
24.	7 December 2013	Mombasa Municipal Stadium, Mombasa	Uganda	2–1	2–2	2013 CECAFA Cup
25.	29 March 2015	CCM Kirumba Stadium, Mwanza	Malawi	1–1	1–1	Friendly

== Honours ==
Young Africans

- Tanzanian Premier League: 2007–08, 2008–09, 2009–10, 2010–11, 2011–12, 2012–13, 2013–14
- Tusker Cup: 2007, 2009

Azam

- Kagame Interclub Cup runner-up: 2012

Individual

- Tanzanian Premier League Best Player: 2009–10
- Tanzania Premier League Golden Boot: 2010–11
- CECAFA Cup Golden Boot: 2009
- Africa Champions league Golden Boot: 2013–14
- VPL Best Player of the Month: April 2015

== See also ==
- List of men's footballers with 100 or more international caps
