= Testfaldet Goitom =

Eritrean footballer

Tesfaldet Gebreslasie
Personal information
- Full name: Testfaldet Gebreslasie Goitom
- Position: Midfielder

Senior career*
Years	Team	Apps	(Gls)
2011	Croydon Kings	1	(0)
2011	Adelaide Blue Eagles	3	(0)
2012	Western District Toros	4	(0)

International career^{‡}
2003–2009	Eritrea	8	(3)
- * Club domestic league appearances and goals as of 24 September 2012 ‡ National team caps and goals as of 22:02, 3 December 2023 (UTC)

Testfaldet Goitom is an Eritrean footballer who last played for the Western District Toros in the FFSA State League.

== International career ==
Goitom played in the 2009 CECAFA Cup in Kenya, scoring in the 2–1 defeat against Rwanda. Twelve members of the team failed to return to Eritrea after the team was eliminated in the quarter-finals stage.

== Personal life ==
Whilst competing in the 2009 CECAFA Cup in Kenya he was part of the Eritrea national football team which failed to return home after competing in the regional tournament in Nairobi. After receiving political asylum from the Australian government, the team moved to Adelaide, Australia.
