= Football at the 1978 All-Africa Games – Men's qualification =

The men's qualification for football tournament at the 1978 All-Africa Games.

== Qualification stage ==
=== Zone I (North Africa) ===
Morocco withdrew.

Team 1	Agg.	Team 2	1st leg	2nd leg
Libya	1–2	Tunisia	0–0	1–2

13 January 1978

Libya	0–0	Tunisia

11 June Stadium, Tripoli
25 January 1978

Tunisia	2–1	Libya
Dhiab 42'; Kaabi 83'		?

Stade El Menzah, Tunis

Libya qualified by taking place Tunisia after it withdrew later. In addition, Algeria qualified as hosts.

=== Zone II (West Africa 1) ===
The tournament was held in Bamako, Mali. Gambia, Guinea, Guinea-Bissau and Senegal withdrew.

Team 1	Score	Team 2
Mali	2–1	Mauritania

27 December 1977

Mali	2–1	Mauritania

Bamako

Mali qualified.

=== Zone III (West Africa 2) ===
The tournament was held in Abidjan, Ivory Coast. Liberia and Sierra Leone withdrew.

Team 1	Agg.	Team 2	1st leg	2nd leg
Ivory Coast	3–3 (2–3 p)	Ghana	2–1	1–2

16 December 1977

Ivory Coast	2–1	Ghana

Stade Félix Houphouët-Boigny, Abidjan

18 December 1977

Ghana	2–1	Ivory Coast
Penalties
	3–2

Stade Félix Houphouët-Boigny, Abidjan

Ghana qualified.

=== Zone IV (West Africa 3) ===
The tournament was held in Lagos, Nigeria. Central African Republic, Niger, Togo and Upper Volta withdrew.

Team 1	Agg.	Team 2	1st leg	2nd leg
Nigeria	9–0	Benin	7–0	2–0

14 January 1978

Nigeria	7–0	Benin
Amiesimaka 9', 20'; Odegbami 47', 82', 84'; Odiye 60'; Chukwu 72'

Surulere Stadium, Lagos

25 January 1978

Benin	0–2	Nigeria
		Odegbami 17'; Chukwu 59' (pen.)

Surulere Stadium, Lagos

Nigeria qualified.

=== Zone V (Central Africa) ===
The tournament was held in Cameroon.

Group A

Team	Pld	W	D	L	GF	GA	GD	Pts
Cameroon	2	1	1	0	4	0	+4	3
Chad	2	1	1	0	3	0	+3	3
Rwanda	2	0	0	2	0	7	–7	0

23 December 1977

Cameroon	0–0	Chad

Stade Omnisports, Yaoundé

25 December 1977

Chad	3–0	Rwanda

Stade Omnisports, Yaoundé

27 December 1977

Cameroon	4–0	Rwanda
Milla

Stade Omnisports, Yaoundé

Group B

Team	Pld	W	D	L	GF	GA	GD	Pts
Gabon	3	3	0	0	5	0	+5	6
Congo	3	2	0	1	12	1	+11	4
Burundi	3	1	0	2	4	12	–8	2
Equatorial Guinea	3	0	0	3	2	10	–8	0

24 December 1977

Congo	8–0	Burundi

Stade de la Réunification, Douala
24 December 1977

Gabon	2–0	Equatorial Guinea

Stade de la Réunification, Douala

26 December 1977

Gabon	1–0	Congo

Stade de la Réunification, Douala
26 December 1977

Burundi	4–2	Equatorial Guinea

Stade de la Réunification, Douala

28 December 1977

Congo	4–0	Equatorial Guinea

Stade de la Réunification, Douala
28 December 1977

Gabon	2–0	Burundi

Stade de la Réunification, Douala

Semifinals

30 December 1977

Gabon	1–3	Chad

Stade de la Réunification, Douala

31 December 1977

Cameroon	Cancelled	Congo

Stade Omnisports, Yaoundé

First game between Cameroon and Congo played on 30/12/1977 but abandoned at 1–2 in 84' due to power cut. It was planned to be replayed on 31/12/1977 but Congo withdrew.

Final

10 January 1978

Cameroon	3–0	Chad
Mangamba 30'; N'Doumbé 51' (pen.); Manga 62'

Stade Omnisports, Yaoundé

Cameroon qualified.

=== Zone VI (East Africa) ===
The tournament was held in Cairo, Egypt. Ethiopia and Kenya withdrew.

Group A

Team	Pld	W	D	L	GF	GA	GD	Pts
Egypt	2	2	0	0	5	0	+5	4
Sudan	2	1	0	1	2	1	+1	2
Somalia	2	0	0	2	0	6	–6	0

12 November 1977

Egypt	4–0	Somalia
Mokhtar 5'; El-Sheikh 10'; Khalil 15'; Shehata 82'

Cairo International Stadium, Cairo

14 November 1977

Sudan	2–0	Somalia
Goal

Cairo International Stadium, Cairo

16 November 1977

Egypt	1–0	Sudan
El-Sheikh

Cairo International Stadium, Cairo

Group B

Team	Pld	W	D	L	GF	GA	GD	Pts
Uganda	2	0	2	0	2	2	0	2
Tanzania	2	0	2	0	2	2	0	2

13 November 1977

Tanzania	1–1	Uganda
		Jimmy Kirunda 13'

Cairo International Stadium, Cairo

15 November 1977

Uganda	1–1	Tanzania

Cairo International Stadium, Cairo

Uganda won the group on lots.

Final

18 November 1977

Egypt	1–0	Uganda
Khalil 16'

Cairo International Stadium, Cairo

Egypt qualified.

=== Zone VII (Southern Africa) ===
The tournament was held in Curepipe, Mauritius. Botswana, Lesotho, Madagascar, Swaziland and Zambia withdrew.

Team	Pld	W	D	L	GF	GA	GD	Pts
Malawi	1	1	0	0	2	1	+1	2
Mauritius	1	0	0	1	1	2	–1	0

24 January 1978

Mauritius	1–2 (a.e.t.)	Malawi
Imbert		Dandize

Stade George V, Curepipe

Malawi qualified.

== Qualifying teams ==
The following countries have qualified for the final tournament:

Zone	Team
Hosts	Algeria
Zone I	Libya
Zone II	Mali
Zone III	Ghana
Zone IV	Nigeria
Zone V	Cameroon
Zone VI	Egypt
Zone VII	Malawi
