= Yidnekachew Shimangus =

Eritrean footballer (born 1978)

Personal information
- Full name: Yidnekachew Shimangus
- Date of birth: 12 February 1978 (age 48)
- Position: Striker

Senior career*
Years	Team	Apps	(Gls)
–2014	Adulis Club		

International career
1998–2007	Eritrea	23	(6)
- * Club domestic league appearances and goals

Yidnekachew Shimangus (born 12 February 1978) is an Eritrean former professional footballer who played as a striker. With six goals in 23 appearances, Shimangus is his country's second all-time top goalscorer and most capped player.

== International career ==
Shimangus was a regular for the Eritrea national team virtually since its inception, and featured in the 2008 Africa Cup of Nations qualification matches, arguably their most successful campaign to date.

He played in two World Cup qualifying matches.

== Career statistics ==
List of international goals scored by Yidnekachew Shimangus
No.	Date	Venue	Opponent	Score	Result	Competition
1	15 July 2000	Cicero Stadium, Asmara, Eritrea	Sudan	2–0	2–1	2002 Africa Cup of Nations qualification
2	10 December 2000	Amahoro Stadium, Kigali, Rwanda	Kenya	1–0	1–2	2001 CECAFA Cup
3	2 September 2006	Moi International Sports Centre, Nairobi, Kenya	Kenya	2–1	2–1	2008 Africa Cup of Nations qualification
4	7 January 2007	Althawra Sports City Stadium, Sana'a, Yemen	Yemen	1–0	1–4	Friendly
5	21 May 2007	Cicero Stadium, Asmara, Eritrea	Sudan	1–0	1–0	Friendly
6	11 December 2007	National Stadium, Dar es Salaam, Tanzania	Djibouti	2–0	3–2	2007 CECAFA Cup
