= Abdul Sibomana =

Rwandan footballer

Personal information
- Date of birth: December 10, 1981 (age 44)
- Place of birth: Rwanda
- Position: Defender

Youth career
- 1997–1999: APR FC

Senior career*
Years	Team	Apps	(Gls)
1999–2008	APR FC		

International career
2000–2007	Rwanda	24	(2)
- * Club domestic league appearances and goals as of January 27, 2007

Abdul Sibomana (born December 10, 1981) is a Rwandan former football defender who last played for APR FC. He was capped 24 times for his country.

== Career ==
After eleven years retired from professional football and is now Anchorman of the U-20 national team from Rwanda.
