= 2000 CECAFA Cup =

Tournament details
- Host country: Uganda
- Dates: 18 November – 2 December
- Teams: 9 (from CECAFA confederations)

Final positions
- Champions: Uganda A (8th title)
- Runners-up: Uganda B
- Third place: Ethiopia

Tournament statistics
- Matches played: 20
- Goals scored: 61 (3.05 per match)
- Top scorer(s): (Uganda) Hassan Mubiru (Uganda) Andrew Mukasa (5 goals each)

The 2000 CECAFA Cup was the 24th edition of the football tournament, which involves teams from Southern and Central Africa. The matches were played in Uganda, a decision which Tanzania protested, but to no avail. Tanzania were also banned from international football by FIFA, the world football governing body. The matches were played from 18 November to 2 December 2000. Prior to the tournament, Djibouti withdrew due to monetary difficulties, but re-entered. Sudan and Zanzibar also withdrew, but stayed out. The reasoning behind their withdrawal was unknown.

Nine teams entered the tournament, as opposed to the twelve teams competing at the previous tournament in 1999. However, there were only eight different nations competing in the tournament as Uganda entered two teams: Uganda (A) and Uganda (B). Uganda (A) was in Group A, and Uganda (B) was in Group B, enabling the two to potentially meet each other in the final, as occurred here. Both Ugandas topped their respective groups, and progressed to the knockout stages along with Ethiopia and Rwanda. Uganda (A) beat Rwanda, and Uganda (B) beat Ethiopia to mean that "the Cranes" (Uganda A) and "the Lions" (Uganda B) would meet in the final. In the final, Uganda (A) captained by George Ssimwogerere of Express, won 2–0. Ethiopia finished third after beating Rwanda on penalties 4–2 after the match finished 0–0.

== Background ==
The CECAFA Cup is considered Africa's oldest football tournament, and involves teams from Central and Southern Africa. The tournament was originally named the Gossage Cup, contested by the four nations of Kenya, Uganda, Tanganyika (modern day Tanzania), and Zanzibar; it ran from 1929 until 1965. In 1967, this became the East and Central African Senior Challenge Cup, often shortened to simply the Challenge Cup, which was competed for five years, until 1971, before the CECAFA Cup was introduced in 1973. The 1999 champions were Rwanda (B), in 2000 they emerged from their group second, after Uganda (B), 5 points behind but 2 points ahead of the next team, Eritrea. They were then knocked out in the semi-finals against Uganda (A). The 2000 champions, Uganda, were knocked out in the 1999 semi-finals by none other than Rwanda.

== Participants ==
9 teams from 8 countries competed, three teams from the original tournament competed (excluding Tanganyika, which changed names and is currently called Tanzania), all 8 nations at this tournament had competed at the 1999 CECAFA Cup.

- Burundi
- Djibouti
- Eritrea
- Ethiopia
- Kenya
- Rwanda
- Somalia
- Uganda A
- Uganda B

== Group stage ==
The group stage began on 18 November and ended on 27 November with Group A's final match between Ethiopia and Burundi. At the end of the group stage, the teams who finished bottom of their group were eliminated, along with the two teams above them (in Group A), and the team above them (in Group B), whereas the teams positioned in the top two slots in the groups progressed to the knock-out rounds. Due to there being an odd number of teams, Group A contained more matches and an additional team, with a total of 5 to Group B's 4 teams.

If two or more teams are equal on points on completion of the group matches, the following criteria are applied to determine the rankings (in descending order):

1. Number of points obtained in games between the teams involved;
2. Goal difference in games between the teams involved;
3. Goals scored in games between the teams involved;
4. Away goals scored in games between the teams involved;
5. Goal difference in all games;
6. Goals scored in all games;
7. Drawing of lots.

=== Group A ===
Played in Nakivubo Stadium, Kampala.

Team	Pld	W	D	L	GF	GA	GD	Pts
Uganda A	4	3	1	0	17	3	+14	10
Ethiopia	4	3	1	0	9	5	+4	10
Burundi	4	2	0	2	8	5	+3	6
Somalia	4	0	1	3	1	11	−10	1
Djibouti	4	0	1	3	4	15	−11	1

18 November 2000

Uganda A	2–2	Ethiopia
Mubiru 3'; Ssemogerere 87'		Getachew; Seman 73'

19 November 2000

Djibouti	0–0	Somalia

20 November 2000

Uganda A	2–1	Burundi
Kawesa 53'; Mbalangi 87'		Banga Lewis Kubi 58'

21 November 2000

Somalia	1–2	Ethiopia
Mohamed 39'		Getachew 30'; Semen 55'

23 November 2000

Djibouti	2–4	Burundi
Ahmed; Hassan Mohamad		Banga Lewis Kubi; Irambona

23 November 2000

Uganda A	6–0	Somalia
Mukasa; Makokha; Mubiru; Buwembo; Kalungi

25 November 2000

Ethiopia	4–2	Djibouti
Abubeker; Getachew; Teshome		Moktar; Fascal

26 November 2000

Somalia	0–3	Burundi
		Daoudi 63' (pen.); Ndikumana 76'; Kimada 86'

27 November 2000

Uganda A	7–0	Djibouti
Mukasa (?), 63'; Ssemogerere 15'; Mubiru; Makokha 17'; Nsubuga

27 November 2000

Ethiopia	1–0	Burundi
Abubeker 89'

=== Group B ===
Played in the Municipal Stadium, Mbale.

Team	Pld	W	D	L	GF	GA	GD	Pts
Uganda B	3	3	0	0	6	2	+4	9
Rwanda	3	1	1	1	5	5	0	4
Eritrea	3	0	2	1	1	2	−1	2
Kenya	3	0	1	2	1	4	−3	1

19 November 2000

Uganda B	3–2	Rwanda
Bantu ?		Nsengiyumva ?

20 November 2000

Kenya	0–0	Eritrea

22 November 2000

Kenya	1–2	Rwanda
Robert Mambo 72'		Nsengiyumva 32'; Uwimana 68'

23 November 2000

Uganda B	1–0	Eritrea
Bantu 75'

25 November 2000

Eritrea	1–1	Rwanda
F. Abreha 64'		Bagumaho 10'

26 November 2000

Kenya	0–2	Uganda B
		Omollo 18' (o.g.); Kizza 30'

== Knockout stage ==
Semi-finals
29 November – Kampala
Uganda A	3
Rwanda	1
30 November – Kampala
Uganda B	1
Ethiopia	0

Final
2 December – Kampala
Uganda A	2
Uganda B	0
Third place
2 December – Kampala
Ethiopia (pen.)	1 (4)
Rwanda	1 (2)

=== Semi-finals ===
29 November 2000

Uganda A	3–1	Rwanda
Mubiru 41'; Obwiny 64'; Kawesa 90'		Sibomana 27'

Nakivubo Stadium, Kampala
30 November 2000

Uganda B	1–0	Ethiopia
Kidega 45'

Nakivubo Stadium, Kampala

=== Third place match ===
2 December 2000

Ethiopia	1–1 (a.e.t.)	Rwanda
Seman 33'		Mulonda 50'
Penalties
	4–2

Nakivubo Stadium, Kampala

=== Final ===
2 December 2000

Uganda A	2–0	Uganda B
Mubiru 76'; Kyambadde 83'

Nakivubo Stadium, Kampala

2000 CECAFA Cup champions

Uganda A
8th title

== Team statistics ==
Teams are ranked using the same tie-breaking criteria as in the group stage, except for the top four teams.

Pos	Team	Pld	W	D	L	GF	GA	GD	Pts	Result
1	Uganda A	6	5	1	0	22	4	+18	16	
2	Uganda B	5	4	0	1	7	4	+3	12	
3	Ethiopia	6	3	2	1	10	7	+3	11	
4	Rwanda	5	1	2	2	7	9	−2	5	
5	Burundi	4	2	0	2	8	5	+3	6	Eliminated in the group stages
6	Eritrea	3	0	2	1	1	2	−1	2	Eliminated in the group stages
7	Kenya	3	0	1	2	1	4	−3	1	Eliminated in the group stages
8	Somalia	4	0	1	3	1	11	−10	1	Eliminated in the group stages
9	Djibouti	4	0	1	3	4	15	−11	1	Eliminated in the group stages
