= Kasule Owen =

Ugandan footballer (born 1989)

Personal information
- Full name: Kasule Owen
- Date of birth: 3 March 1989 (age 37)
- Place of birth: Kampala, Uganda
- Height: 1.85 m (6 ft 1 in)
- Position: Midfielder

Team information
- Current team: URA SC
- Number: 8

Senior career*
Years	Team	Apps	(Gls)
2006–2008	Kampala City Council FC		
2008–2012	Bunamwaya SC		
2012	Hoang Anh Gia Lai F.C.	6	(1)
2013–15	URA SC		

International career^{‡}
2007.	Uganda	27	(4)
- * Club domestic league appearances and goals as of 5 January 2013 ‡ National team caps and goals as of 5 June 2013

Kasule Owen (born 3 March 1989 in Kampala) is a Ugandan soccer player, who played primarily as an attacking midfielder for clubs in Uganda while representing the Uganda national team internationally.

== Club career ==
=== Early career ===
Owen began his professional football career after being scouted from the Ugandan first division side Nakawa United where he started his playing career before joining Kampala City Council FC. Upon joining KCC at the age of 17, he quickly adapted to the demands of professional play, forming key partnerships with the squad which greatly contributed to the team's success in the 2007/08 season.

=== Bunamwaya F.C ===
In 2008, Owen joined Bunamwaya SC where the League Title was won in 2009–10, scoring 12 goals, and qualified for the African Champions League. He spent three years playing for the club (2008-2011) becoming a key figure in the mid-field. Kasule's time at Bunamwaya ended in December 2011 when he transferred to Vietnamese V.League 1 club Hoang Anh Gia Lai FC on a two year professional contract.

=== Hoang Anh Gia Lai F.C ===
Kasule arrived at Hoang Anh Gia Lai on December 20, 2011 after signing a two year contract which made him the third Bunamwaya SC player to join a Vietnamese club within a year. However, his tenure proved brief as his contract expired with Hoang Anh Gia Lai F.C. after approximately four months with the club. He later returned to Uganda as a free agent and quickly signed a two-year deal with URA FC.

=== URA SC ===
In the July 2012, Owen joined the URA SC, signing a two-year contract as a free agent following the expiration of his deal with Hoang Anh Gia Lai F.C.
