= Mike Sserumaga =

Ugandan footballer (born 1989)

Personal information
- Full name: Michael Sserumaga
- Date of birth: August 3, 1989 (age 37)
- Place of birth: Kampala, Uganda
- Height: 1.75 m (5 ft 9 in)
- Position: Forward

Team information
- Current team: Lweza FC

Youth career
- –2007: Police Jinja

Senior career*
Years	Team	Apps	(Gls)
2007	Police Jinja		
2008–2009	Helsingborg		
2009–2010	URA		
2010	Bunamwaya		
2011	Rayon Sport		
2011	St. George Addis Ababa		
2012–2013	Proline FC		
2013	Victoria University SC		
2014–2016	Lweza FC		
2016–2018	Vipers		
2018–	Villa		

International career
2008–	Uganda	34	(6)
- * Club domestic league appearances and goals

Michael Sserumaga (born 3 August 1989 in Kampala) is a Ugandan football player, who plays for SC Villa.

== Career ==
He began his career at Police Jinja before transferring in August 2007 to the youth side from Helsingborg. He was promoted to the senior squad for the 2008 season. However during a training session with Ugandan club KB Lions he suffered a severe ankle injury that ruled him out for almost a year.

In September 2009, Sserumagga signed a one-year contract with Uganda Revenue Authority SC to rehabilitate himself back to form and secure a return to Europe. Uganda’s Caf Champions League representatives Bunamwaya S.C. signed Sserumaga for a 6 month contract.

In February 2011, he joined the Rwandan side Rayon Sport.

== International ==
His debut for the Uganda national football team was on 8 June 2008 against Benin.
