= 2025 Africa Cup of Nations qualification preliminary round =

Tournament details
- Dates: 20–26 March 2024
- Teams: 8 (from 1 confederation)

Tournament statistics
- Matches played: 8
- Goals scored: 15 (1.88 per match)
- Top scorer(s): (Eswatini) Sabelo Ndzinisa (Somalia) Mohamed Awad (2 goals each)

The preliminary round of the 2025 Africa Cup of Nations qualification tournament decided the four teams which advanced to the group stage of the qualification tournament. The preliminary round consisted of the eight lowest-ranked teams among the 52 entrants, and was held from 20 to 26 March 2024.

The eight teams were split into four ties which were played in home-and-away two-legged format. The four winners (Chad, Eswatini, Liberia and South Sudan) advanced to the group stage to join the 44 teams which entered directly.

== Draw ==
The preliminary round draw was held on 20 February 2024, 14:00 CAT (UTC+2) at the CAF headquarters in Cairo, Egypt. The eight involved national teams were seeded into two pots of four based on the FIFA World Rankings from 15 February 2024 (shown in parentheses).

Seychelles (199) and Eritrea (unranked) were excluded from the qualifiers.

The teams in bold qualified for the qualifying group stage.

Pot 1	Pot 2
**Eswatini** (149); **Liberia** (152); **South Sudan** (166); Mauritius (177)	**Chad** (181); São Tomé and Príncipe (191); Djibouti (192); Somalia (198)

== Matches ==
The first legs were played on 20 and 22 March, and the second legs were played on 26 March 2024.

Team 1	Agg.	Team 2	1st leg	2nd leg
Somalia	2–5	Eswatini	0–3	2–2
São Tomé and Príncipe	1–1 (a)	South Sudan	1–1	0–0
Chad	3–1	Mauritius	1–0	2–1
Djibouti	0–2	Liberia	0–2	0–0

20 March 2024
19:00 UTC+0

Somalia	0–3	Eswatini
	Report	Figuareido 33'; Ndzinisa 45+3'; Thwala 56'

Ben M'Hamed El Abdi Stadium, El Jadida (Morocco)
Referee: Andre Kolissala Mbangui (Central African Republic)
26 March 2024
15:00 UTC+2

Eswatini	2–2	Somalia
Ndzinisa 46'; Matsebula 49'	Report	Awad 76', 84'

Mbombela Stadium, Mbombela (South Africa)
Referee: Joseph Odey Ogabor (Nigeria)

Eswatini won 5–2 on aggregate.

22 March 2024
19:00 UTC+0

São Tomé and Príncipe	1–1	South Sudan
Leal 50'	Report	Elly 78'

Berkane Municipal Stadium, Berkane (Morocco)
Referee: Alhasan Bass (Gambia)
26 March 2024
17:00 UTC+0

South Sudan	0–0	São Tomé and Príncipe
	Report

Berkane Municipal Stadium, Berkane (Morocco)
Referee: Keren Yocette (Seychelles)

1–1 on aggregate. South Sudan won on away goals.

22 March 2024
19:00 UTC+1

Chad	1–0	Mauritius
Thiam 90+3'	Report

Ahmadou Ahidjo Stadium, Yaoundé (Cameroon)
Referee: Ahmed Hassan Hussein (Somalia)
26 March 2024
19:00 UTC+4

Mauritius	1–2	Chad
Villeneuve 45+2'	Report	Hiver 74'; Hissein 90+10'

Cote d'Or National Sports Complex, Saint Pierre
Referee: Hassen Corneh (Liberia)

Chad won 3–1 on aggregate.

20 March 2024
22:00 UTC+0

Djibouti	0–2	Liberia
	Report	Sangare 23' (pen.); Dorley 35'

Stade de Marrakech, Marrekech (Morocco)
Referee: Mehrez Melki (Tunisia)
26 March 2024
16:00 UTC+0

Liberia	0–0	Djibouti
	Report

Samuel Kanyon Doe Sports Complex, Monrovia
Referee: Karim Sabry (Morocco)

Liberia won 2–0 on aggregate.

== Goalscorers ==
There were 15 goals scored in 8 matches, for an average of 1.88 goals per match.

2 goals

- (Eswatini) Sabelo Ndzinisa
- (Somalia) Mohamed Awad

1 goal

- (Chad) Ousmane Hissein
- (Chad) Amine Hiver
- (Chad) Mahamat Thiam
- (Eswatini) Justice Figuareido
- (Eswatini) Bongwa Matsebula
- (Eswatini) Kwakhe Thwala
- (Liberia) Oscar Dorley
- (Liberia) Mohammed Sangare
- (Mauritius) Jérémy Villeneuve
- (São Tomé and Príncipe) Luís Leal
- (South Sudan) Data Elly
