= Ermias Tekle =

Eritrean footballer

Personal information
- Full name: Ermias Tekle Wolday
- Place of birth: Eritrea
- Position: Center back

Senior career*
Years	Team	Apps	(Gls)
2007–2010	Adulis Club		
2011–2012	Croydon Kings	15	(0)
2012	Western Strikers	7	(0)
2012	Adelaide Comets	11	(0)
2013	Western Strikers	20	(1)
2016	Hume United	5	(0)

International career^{‡}
2005–2009	Eritrea	?	(?)
- * Club domestic league appearances and goals as of 11 October 2015 ‡ National team caps and goals as of 9 July 2012

Ermias Wolday is an Eritrean footballer who currently plays for Hume United.

== Club career ==
In 2011, he signed with FFSA Super League club Croydon Kings after being granted political asylum by the Australian government.

== International career ==
He played in the 2009 CECAFA Cup in Kenya, scoring an own goal in the 2–1 group match defeat to Rwanda.

== Personal life ==
Whilst competing in the 2009 CECAFA Cup in Kenya he was part of the Eritrea national football team which failed to return home after competing in the regional tournament in Nairobi. After receiving political asylum from the Australian government, the team moved to Adelaide, Australia.
