= Simon Sserunkuma =

Ugandan footballer (born 1991)

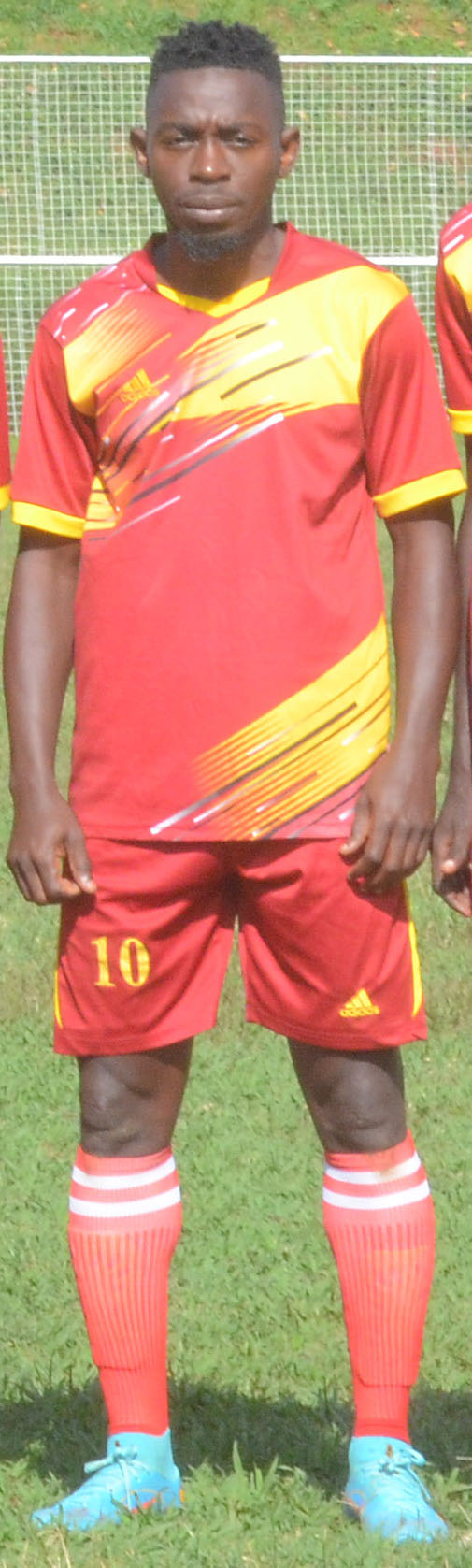
- 2022 by Samson Ssemakadde

Personal information
- Full name: Simon Peter Sserunkuma
- Date of birth: 19 September 1991 (age 35)
- Place of birth: Mengo, Uganda
- Height: 1.78 m (5 ft 10 in)
- Position: Winger

Team information
- Current team: Simba SC
- Number: 7

Youth career
- 2000–2004: Super Cubs Youth Academy
- 2004–2006: Mutundwe Youth Academy

Senior career*
Years	Team	Apps	(Gls)
2007–2008	Victors FC		
2009–2014	SC Villa		
2014	Express FC		
2014–	Simba SC		

International career^{‡}
2009–	Uganda	3	(0)
- * Club domestic league appearances and goals as of 17 March 2011 ‡ National team caps and goals as of 4 March 2011

Simon Peter Sserunkuma (born 19 September 1991) is a Ugandan professional footballer who plays for Simba SC in the Tanzanian Premier League.

== Club career ==
=== Victors FC ===
He made his debut during the 2007 season in a game against Kampala City Council FC. During his time with Victors FC he won the 2008 Super League most valuable player and Uganda Cup in the same year.

=== SC Villa ===
He became the most expensive player in Ugandan history when SC Villa paid Victors FC 16 million shillings ($10,000) in May 2009.

== International career ==
Sserunkuma made his national team debut for Bobby Williamson came in a 2–1 win over Malawi in 2009. In March 2010, his recovery from a hamstring injury to be available for the African Nations Championship (CHAN) qualifier against Burundi was crucial to the success of the National Team.
