= Justice Figuareido =

Liswati footballer (born 1998)

Personal information
- Full name: Justice Johnpaul Figuareido
- Date of birth: 26 July 1998 (age 28)
- Place of birth: Mbabane, Swaziland (now eSwatini)
- Height: 1.80 m (5 ft 11 in)
- Positions: Winger; forward

Team information
- Current team: Chippa United
- Number: 9

Senior career*
Years	Team	Apps	(Gls)
2017–2018	Manzini Sundowns		
2018–2020	Maritzburg United	14	(0)
2019–2020	→ Mbombela United (loan)	18	(1)
2020–2021	TS Galaxy	5	(1)
2021–2023	All Stars	51	(10)
2023–2025	Richards Bay	44	(5)
2025–	Chippa United	16	(2)

International career^{‡}
2018–	Eswatini	28	(4)
- * Club domestic league appearances and goals as of 23:59, 4 March 2026 (UTC) ‡ National team caps and goals as of 18:18, 31 March 2026 (UTC)

Justice Johnpaul Figuareido (born 26 July 1998) is a Liswati professional footballer who plays as a winger and a forward for South African Premiership club Chippa United and the eSwatini national team.

== Club career ==
Justice Figuareido began his career in eSwatini with Manzini Sundowns in 2017 before joining South African Premiership club Maritzburg United in 2018, debuting during the 0–0 draw against Bidvest Wits on 18 August 2018. He spent the 2019–20 season on loan with Mbombela United.

He joined TS Galaxy on 22 September 2020 and debuted during the 1–0 loss against Stellenbosch on 12 June 2020.

He then joined All Stars on 31 August 2021 and Richards Bay on 1 June 2023.

On 27 August 2025, Figuareido joined Chippa United on a two-year deal reportedly worth €100,000. He scored his first goal for the club on 16 September 2025 during the 2–1 victory against Orbit College.

== International career ==
Figuareido made his debut for eSwatini on 12 October 2018 during the 4–1 loss against Egypt during 2019 Africa Cup of Nations qualification.

He scored his first goal for eSwatini on 20 March 2024 during the 3–0 victory against Somalia during 2025 Africa Cup of Nations qualification. He also scored a brace during the 2–2 draw against Angola during 2026 FIFA World Cup qualification on 8 October 2025.

== Career statistics ==
=== International ===
As of match played 31 March 2026.

Appearances and goals by national team and year
National team	Year	Apps	Goals
Eswatini	2018	2	0
Eswatini	2019	2	0
Eswatini	2020	0	0
Eswatini	2021	6	0
Eswatini	2022	2	0
Eswatini	2023	1	0
Eswatini	2024	5	1
Eswatini	2025	7	2
Eswatini	2026	2	1
Total		28	4

Scores and results list eSwatini's goal tally first, score column indicates score after each Figuareido goal.

List of international goals scored by Justice Figueraido
No.	Date	Venue	Cap	Opponent	Score	Result	Competition
1	20 March 2024	Stade El Abdi, El Jadida, Morocco	14	Somalia	1–0	3–0	2025 Africa Cup of Nations qualification
2	8 October 2025	Somhlolo National Stadium, Lobamba, Eswatini	26	Angola	1–0	2–2	2026 FIFA World Cup qualification
3	8 October 2025	Somhlolo National Stadium, Lobamba, Eswatini	26	Angola	2–0	2–2	2026 FIFA World Cup qualification
4	31 March 2026	Somhlolo National Stadium, Lobamba, Eswatini	28	Eritrea	1–2	1–2	2027 Africa Cup of Nations qualification
