= Guthrie Zhokinyi =

Zimbabwean footballer (born 1985)

Personal information
- Date of birth: 8 May 1985 (age 41)
- Place of birth: Chitungwiza, Zimbabwe
- Height: 1.76 m (5 ft 9 in)
- Position: Defender

Senior career*
Years	Team	Apps	(Gls)
2006	Douglas Warriors		
2007–2008	Shooting Stars		
2009–2015	Dynamos		
2016–2018	Triangle		

International career^{‡}
2009–2012	Zimbabwe	4	(1)
- * Club domestic league appearances and goals as of 15 November 2020 ‡ National team caps and goals as of 15 November 2020

Guthrie Zhokinyi (born 8 May 1985) is a retired Zimbabwean football defender.
