= Dar El Salam =

City in Egypt

Dar el-Salam دار السلام
- City
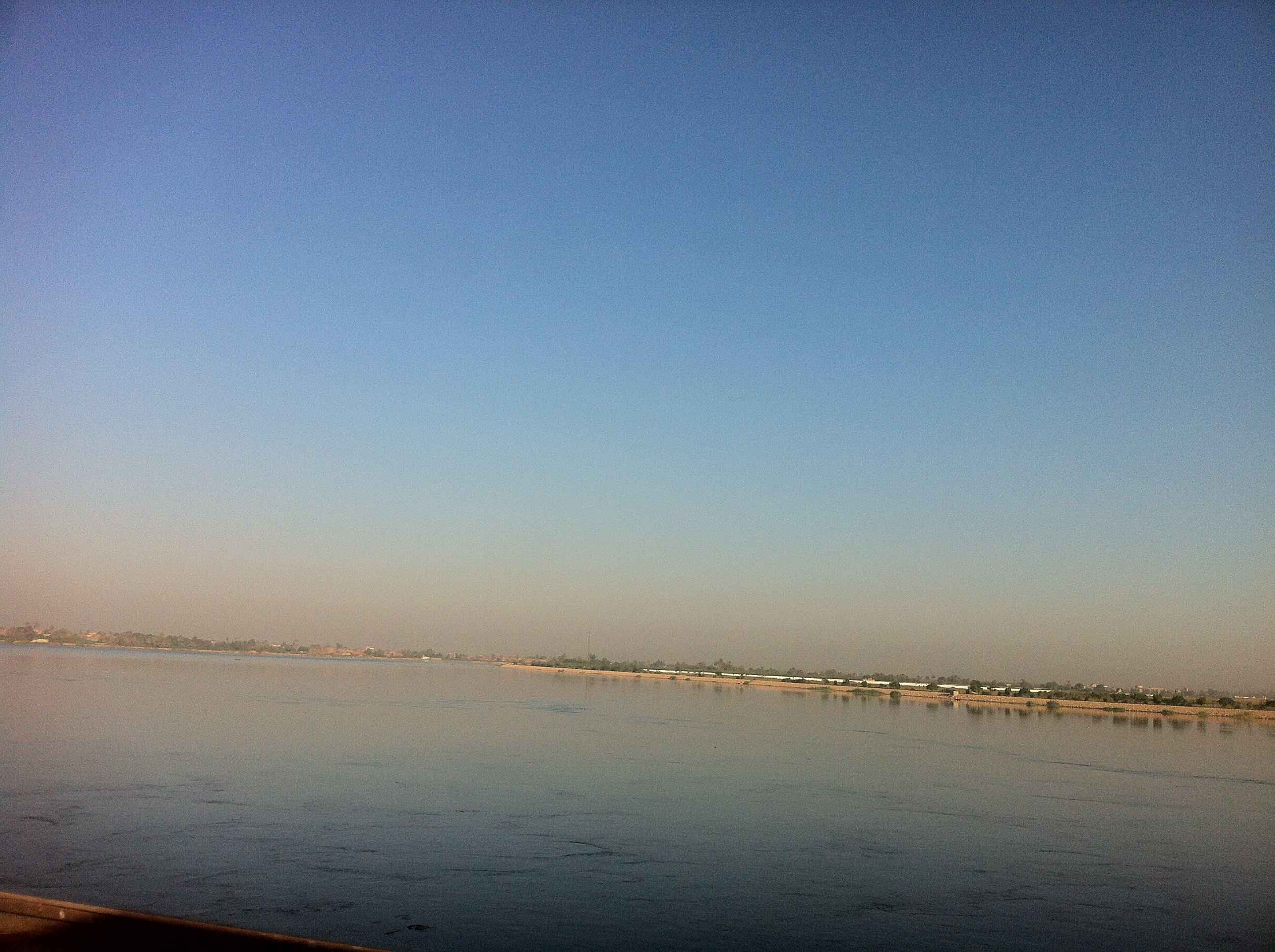

- Location in Egypt
- Coordinates: 26°16′N 32°03′E
- Country: Egypt
- Governorate: Sohag

Area
  - Total: 227.3 km^{2} (87.8 sq mi)
- Elevation: 69 m (226 ft)

Population (2023)
  - Total: 471,398
  - Density: 2,074/km^{2} (5,371/sq mi)
- Time zone: UTC+2 (EET)
  - Summer (DST): UTC+3 (EEST)

Dar el-Salam (Arabic: دار السلام, lit. 'abode of peace') is a small Upper Egyptian city near Akhmim. It is located on the east bank of the Nile, in the Sohag Governorate.

The city used to be two separate villages – Naga el Daba (Arabic: نجع الدابة) and El Galaila (Arabic: الجلايلة).

== About ==
The city of Dar el-Salam had a population of 39,500 in 2001.

In a 2008 report produced by the local authorities of Dar el-Salam, the city had an overall illiteracy rate of 35% amongst males and 48% amongst females was identified, putting the overall illiteracy rate at 41.5% of the total population.

In 2011, Dar el-Salam was identified by the United Nations Development Programme's Egypt Human Development Report (EHDR) as one of Egypt's five poorest districts on the Human Development Index for the second year in a row.

== Sectarianism ==
In 2000, sectarian clashes occurred in the Dar El Salam region in the village Kosheh between Coptic Christians and Muslims resulting in the deaths of 22 Copts and 1 Muslim.

In 2003 in the town of Beit Alim, a vendetta feud between two families left 22 members of one family dead, including a nine-year-old child.

== See also ==
- List of cities and towns in Egypt
