= Isaias Andberhian =

Eritrean footballer

Personal information
- Date of birth: 28 January 1984 (age 42)
- Position: Forward

International career
Years	Team	Apps	(Gls)
2009–	Eritrea	2	(0)

Isaias Andberhian (born 28 January 1984) is an Eritrean footballer. He currently plays for the Eritrea national football team.

== International career ==
Andberhian played in the 2009 CECAFA Cup in Kenya, scoring in the 3–1 victory against Somalia
