= Mumias Sports Complex =

- Full name: Mumias Sports Complex
- Location: Mumias, Kenya
- Owner: Mumias Sugar Company Limited
- Operator: Mumias Sugar Company Limited
- Capacity: 5,000
- Surface: Grass

Tenant
- Vihiga United F.C.

Mumias Sports Complex is a multi-use stadium in Mumias, Kenya. It is used mostly for football matches and was the home stadium of the defunct Mumias Sugar F.C. The stadium holds 10,000 people. This was one of the venues for the 2009 CECAFA Cup held in Kenya between 28 November and 12 December 2009. For the 2011 season and following a big money sponsorship deal by the Mumias Sugar company, local giants AFC Leopards SC, popularly known as Ingwe, will use both the Nyayo national stadium and the Mumias sports complex as their home ground. The first match to be played by Ingwe at the Mumias Sports Complex in the 2011 season was against Karuturi sports which Ingwe won 1–0. Notably, the AFC Leopards VS Gor Mahia tie which had earlier been scheduled for the Moi International Sports Center Kasarani (MISC) on June 5 was played at the Mumias Sports Complex

KPL Pace setters Tusker Fc are said to have opted to take their crunch tie against Gor Mahia Fc on May 21 to the Mumias Sports complex too. The tie had been set to be played at the MISC but the stadium will not be ready in time.

Most recently, Vihiga United has been using it as their home for the Kenyan Premier League while Nzoia Sugar FC has been using it occasionally.
