= Denden Stadium =

Stadium in Asmara, Eritrea

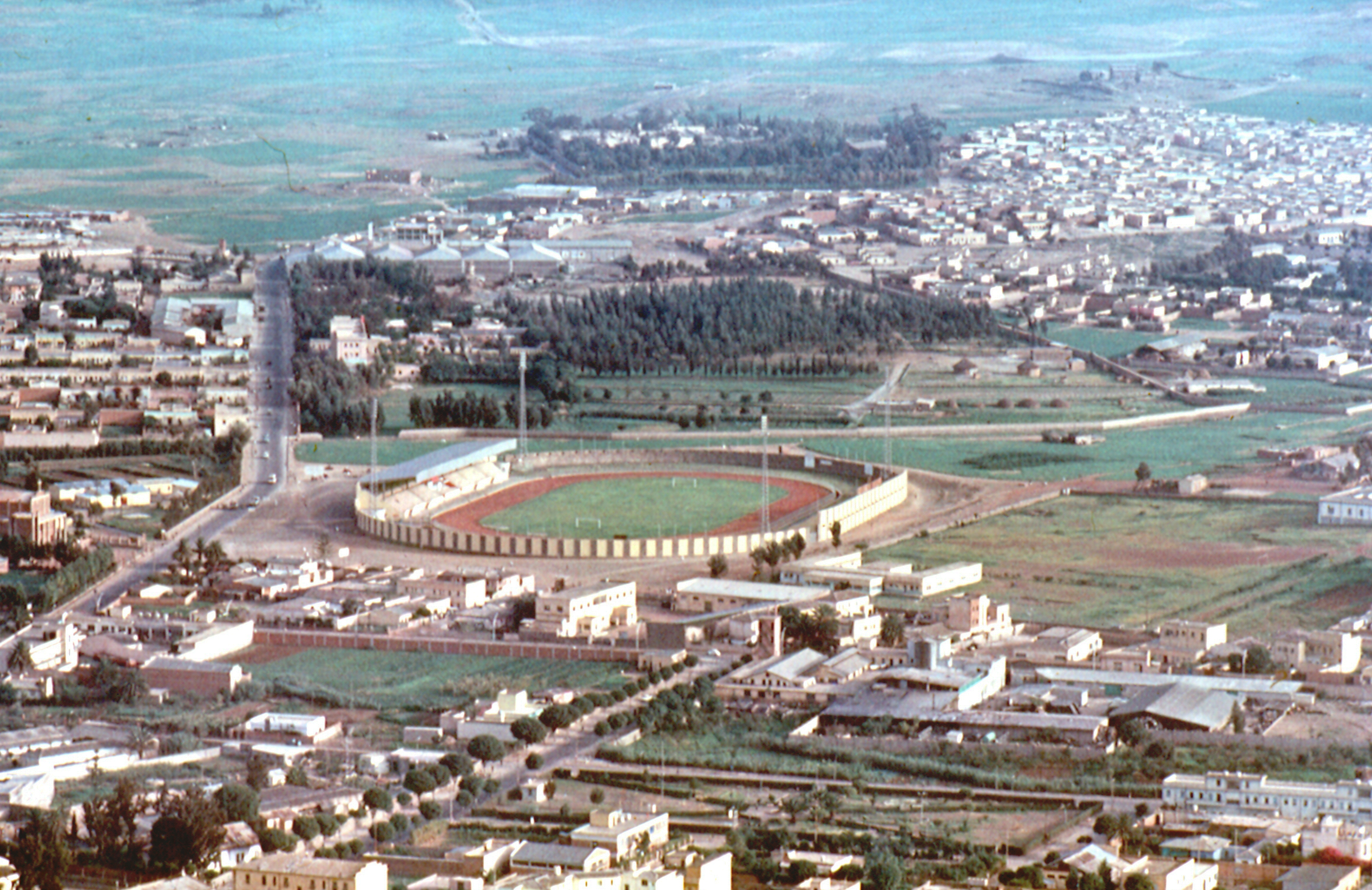
- Interactive map of Denden Stadium
- Location: Asmara, Eritrea
- Coordinates: 15°20′36.6″N 38°55′32.3″E
- Capacity: 20,000
- Surface: Grass

Construction
- Built: 1938
- Opened: 1939
- Renovated: 1959

Denden Stadium is a multi-use stadium in Asmara, Eritrea. The facility was built in 1958 by the Asmara municipality. It is currently used mostly for football matches. The initial capacity of the stadium was 5,000 seats. It has recently been upgraded to 10,000 seats, which is part of the advancements it has made.
