= Edward Kalungi =

Ugandan footballer (born 1977)

Personal information
- Date of birth: 12 October 1977 (age 49)
- Place of birth: Kampala, Uganda
- Height: 1.78 m (5 ft 10 in)
- Position: Defender

Senior career*
Years	Team	Apps	(Gls)
1991–2003	Express FC		
2003	Shinas FC		
2004	Hue F.C.		
2005	Look E San F.C.		
2005–2007	Al-Wasl F.C.		
2007–2010	Sulut United F.C.	27	(4)

International career
1991-1992	Uganda U20		
1993–2003	Uganda	10	(0)
- * Club domestic league appearances and goals

Kalungi Edward (born 12 October 1977) is a Ugandan former footballer who played as a defender for the Uganda national team between 1993 and 2003.

== Club career ==
Kalungi played club football for Express FC (Uganda), Shinas F.C. (Oman), Hue F.C. (Vietnam), Look E San F.C. (Thailand), Al-Wasl F.C. (U.A.E), and Sulut United F.C. (Indonesia). He retired in 2010.

== International career ==
Kalungi made his debut for the Uganda national team on 3 September 1993 against Tanzania. Kalungi scored his first goal for the Uganda national team on 23 November 2000 against the Somalia national team in the 2000 CECAFA Cup.

== Post-playing career ==
In 2013, Kalungi was elected as a delegate for Uganda Football Players Association. In December 2018, Kalungi was appointed as a FUFA staff as Head Of Estates Manager, a department overseeing football infrastructure in Uganda.
