= Filmon Tseqay =

Eritrean footballer

Filmon Tseqay (born is an Eritrean footballer. He currently plays for the Eritrea national football team.

== International career ==
Tseqay played in the 2009 CECAFA Cup in Kenya, scoring in the 3–1 victory against Somalia.
