= Dan Wagaluka =

Ugandan footballer (born 1986)

Personal information
- Full name: Daniel Wagaluka
- Date of birth: 25 December 1986 (age 39)
- Place of birth: Iganga, Uganda
- Height: 1.60 m (5 ft 3 in)
- Position: Midfielder

Team information
- Current team: Nyamityobora FC

Senior career*
Years	Team	Apps	(Gls)
2004	Iganga Town Council		
2005–2006	SC Villa		
2006–2008	URA SC		
2009–2010	Azam		
2010–2011	URA SC		
2011–2012	APR FC		
2012–2017	Soana FC		
2013	→ AFC Leopards (loan)	4	(0)
2015	→ Lweza FC (loan)		
2017–2018	Water FC		
2018	LLB Académic FC		
2018–2019	Maroons FC	13	(0)
2019–	Nyamityobora FC		

International career^{‡}
2004–2012	Uganda	57	(7)
- * Club domestic league appearances and goals as of 13 June 2021 ‡ National team caps and goals as of 13 June 2021

Dan Wagaluka (born 25 December 1986) is a Ugandan football midfielder who plays for Nyamityobora FC.
