= List of Kenya international footballers =

The Kenya national football team has represented Kenya in international association football since 1926. The governing body of Kenyan football, the Football Kenya Federation (FKF), was founded in 1946 and became a member of FIFA in 1960. The team participated in its first international match on 1 May 1926, drawing 1–1 with Uganda.

== Players ==
As of match played 15 November 2023

Key
**Bold**	Played for the national team in the past year

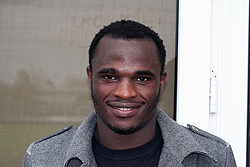
Dennis Oliech attained 76 caps and scored 34 goals between 2002 and 2015.

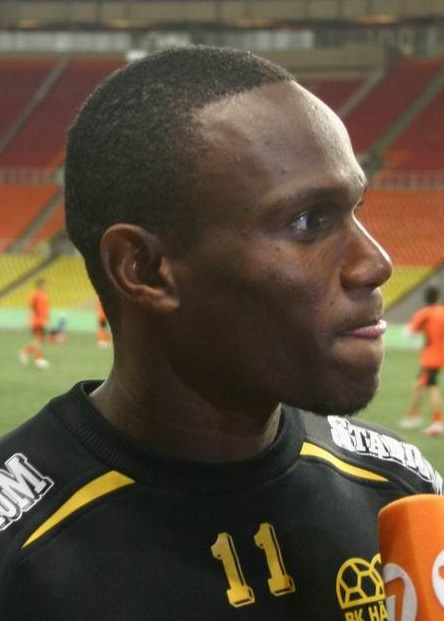
Robert Mambo Mumba has represented Kenya 72 times.

Kenya national team footballers with at least 20 appearances
No.	Name	National career	Caps	Goals
1	Musa Otieno	1993–2009	90	9
2	Jonathan Niva	1965–1976	88	10
3	Allan Thigo	1969–1978	81	11
4	John Nyawanga	1965–1976	80	17
5	Dennis Oliech	2002–2015	76	34
6	Robert Mambo Mumba	2000–2009	72	13
7	Titus Mulama	2001–2012	71	8
8	Francis Onyiso	1996–2011	70	0
9	Wilberforce Mulamba	1978–1988	68	14
9	James Siang'a	1963–1975	68	0
11	William Ouma	1965–1977	66	35
12	Mahmoud Abbas	1976–1989	65	0
12	Victor Wanyama	2007–2020	65	8
14	David Owino	2012–2020	64	2
15	Joe Kadenge	1957–1970	63	25
15	Josephat Murila	1979–1985	63	1
17	Bobby Ogolla	1977–1987	62	1
18	Jockins Atudo	2009–2018	60	6
19	Sammy Omollo	1991–2000	57	2
20	Elly Adero	1974–1984	56	6
21	Duncan Ochieng	1997–2013	55	0
22	Aggrey Lukoye	1975–1979	54	10
22	Sammy Onyango	1983–1991	54	3
22	George Japhet Waweru	1999–2007	54	0
25	Ambrose Ayoyi	1980–1988	53	13
26	John Baraza	2002–2011	52	21
26	Hussein Kheri	1981–1987	52	3
28	Daniel Anyanzwa	1966–1973	51	1
29	Livingstone Madegwa	1964–1972	49	26
29	Henry Motego	1987–1996	49	12
29	Allan Wanga	2007–2018	49	12
32	Tobias Ochola	1987–1992	48	0
32	Mike Origi	1990–2004	48	17
32	**Michael Olunga**	2015–	48	21
35	**Teddy Akumu**	2011–	47	0
36	**Musa Mohammed**	2011–	45	0
36	Eric Omondi Ongao	1996–2001	45	6
38	Tom Juma	1995–2005	44	2
38	Mulinge Ndeto	2003–2013	44	1
40	Jared Ingutia	1976–1985	43	7
40	Anthony Lwanga	1990–1996	43	4
40	McDonald Mariga	2003–2018	43	4
40	Mickey Weche	1985–1992	43	4
44	**Aboud Omar**	2013–	42	0
45	Edgar Ochieng	2003–2011	41	0
45	Mark Sirengo	1999–2005	41	7
47	Francis Kahata	2012–2020	40	2
47	**Clifton Miheso**	2012–	40	7
47	Francis Odour	1991–1999	40	6
47	James Situma	2009–2016	40	2
51	John Muiruri	1998–2006	39	1
51	Adam Shaban	2002–2007	39	0
53	Abbas Magongo	1985–1994	38	4
53	Anthony Mukabwa	1964–1969	38	1
53	Austin Odour	1986–1990	38	0
53	Arnold Origi	2005–2020	38	0
53	Peter Otieno	1980–1984	38	1
58	Washington Muhanji	1983–1992	37	0
58	**David Ochieng**	2012–	37	2
60	Wycliffe Anyangu	1987–1992	36	0
60	Ahmed Breik	1964–1970	36	7
60	**Eric Johana Omondi**	2015–	36	4
63	Brian Onyango	2011–2020	35	3
63	Martin Ochieng	1977–1985	35	2
63	**Eric Ouma**	2016–	35	0
63	Paul Were	2010–2019	35	3
67	Douglas Mutua	1983–1992	34	3
67	Daniel Nicodemus	1963–1972	34	17
67	Benedict Okoth	1960–1970	34	0
70	George Onyango	1986–1990	33	3
70	Dennis Odhiambo	2011–2019	33	1
70	Philip Opiyo	2001–2004	33	0
73	Ali Kajo	1959–1969	32	26
73	Joe Okeyo	1964–1969	32	1
73	Maurice Sunguti	1997–2005	32	14
73	Sammy Taabu	1981–1985	32	2
77	Victor Onyango	1998–2004	31	0
77	Peter Ouma	1966–1973	31	6
79	Joe Masiga	1979–1985	30	6
79	Patrick Oboya	2007–2012	30	2
79	Allan Odhiambo	1990–1996	30	3
79	Samson Odore	1969–1975	30	0
79	George Situma	1961–1964	30	4
84	Issa Kassim	2000–2004	29	0
84	Nahashon Mahila	1982–1986	29	4
84	Patrick Matasi	2017–2019	29	0
84	Mike Mururi	1997–2007	29	3
84	Pascal Ochieng	2001–2012	29	3
84	Boniface Oluoch	2010–2018	29	0
84	Johanna Omolo	2011–2020	29	6
84	Peter Opiyo	2009–2014	29	0
84	Benson Waga	1971–1975	29	0
93	Jackson Aluko	1970–1975	28	1
93	Charles Ochieng	1974–1980	28	11
95	Osborne Monday	2007–2017	27	1
95	George Owino	2005–2010	27	1
95	Jesse Were	2013–2019	27	0
98	Elijah Lidonde	1950–1961	26	33
98	Ayub Masika	2012–2020	26	4
98	Anthony Mathenge	2002–2009	26	2
98	**Kenneth Muguna**	2017–	26	2
98	Peter Oronge	1957–1965	26	1
98	Charles Otieno	1980–1989	26	1
98	Amrani Shiba	1961–1964	26	0
105	David Asibwa	1965–1973	25	4
105	Peter Dawo	1987–1990	25	2
105	John Njoroge Mwangi	2007–2011	25	1
105	Kevin Ochieng	2007–2012	25	2
109	Daniel Agina	1996–2003	24	0
109	**Kevin Kimani**	2010–	24	0
109	David Ochieng	1986–1991	24	0
109	George Odhiambo	2009–2017	24	1
109	Vitalis Owour	1987–1992	24	1
109	Ali Sungura	1962–1967	24	4
115	Mike Baraza	2004–2013	23	5
115	Edward Wamalwa	1973–1977	23	0
115	James Ojiambo	1973–1977	23	0
115	Nasir Omar	1962–1969	23	0
115	Moses Wabwayi	1965–1968	23	2
120	Abdalla Ali Breik	2003–2009	22	0
120	Munialo Opicho	1952–1961	22	8
120	Julius Owino	2004–2010	22	2
123	Kadir Farah	1968–1973	21	2
123	Vincent Kwarula	1990–1997	21	1
123	Mohammed Magogo	1973–1977	21	0
123	Bernard Otieno	1990–1993	21	2
127	Joseph Chanzu	1978–1980	20	0
127	Anthony Kimani	2008–2012	20	0
127	Charles Makunda	1969–1972	20	0
127	Humphrey Mieno	2010–2018	20	0
127	Binzi Mwakolo	1975–1977	20	8
127	Daniel Odhiambo	1975–1981	20	0
127	**Joash Onyango**	2018–	20	0
127	Jack Shikhulu	1979–1983	20	7
