= 1988 African Cup of Nations squads =

Below is a list of squads used in the 1988 African Cup of Nations.

== Group A ==
=== Algeria ===
Coach: (Soviet Union) Evgeny Rogov

No.	Pos.	Player	Date of birth (age)	Caps	Club
1	GK	Nacerdine Drid (c)	22 January 1957 (aged 31)		(Algeria) Mouloudia d'Oran
16	GK	Kamel Kadri	19 November 1963 (aged 24)		(Algeria) Mouloudia d'Alger
22	GK	Layachi Nouri	23 September 1960 (aged 27)		(Algeria) Union d'El Harrach
5	DF	Abderrazak Belgherbi	29 October 1961 (aged 26)		(Algeria) Olympique de Chlef
4	DF	Ali Benhalima	21 January 1962 (aged 26)		(Algeria) Association d'Oran
19	DF	Mohamed Chaib	20 May 1958 (aged 29)		(Algeria) RS Kouba
2	DF	Mokhtar Kechamli	2 November 1962 (aged 25)		(Algeria) Association d'Oran
3	DF	Rachid Maatar	27 June 1959 (aged 28)		(France) Nancy
20	DF	Fodil Megharia	23 May 1961 (aged 26)		(Algeria) Olympique de Chlef
15	DF	Chaabane Merzekane	8 March 1959 (aged 29)		(Algeria) Mouloudia d'Alger
10	MF	Lakhdar Belloumi	29 December 1958 (aged 29)		(Algeria) Mouloudia d'Oran
12	MF	Kamel Djahmoune	16 June 1961 (aged 26)		(Algeria) Mouloudia d'Alger
21	MF	Kader Ferhaoui	19 March 1965 (aged 22)		(France) Montpellier
6	MF	Mohamed Kaci Said	2 May 1958 (aged 29)		(Algeria) RS Kouba
18	MF	Abdelouahab Maïche	30 November 1959 (aged 28)		(Algeria) Mouloudia d'Alger
8	MF	Hocine Yahi	25 April 1960 (aged 27)		(Algeria) Jeunesse de Belcourt
17	MF	Said Meghichi	5 February 1961 (aged 27)		(Algeria) Mouloudia d'Alger
13	FW	Ahmed Chawki Bentayeb	1 May 1962 (aged 25)		(Algeria) Union d'Aïn Béïda
7	FW	Ali Bouafia	5 August 1964 (aged 23)		(France) Lyon
14	FW	Hakim Medane	5 September 1966 (aged 21)		(Algeria) JS Tizi Ouzou
9	FW	Djamel Menad	22 July 1960 (aged 27)		(France) Nîmes

=== Ivory Coast ===
Coach: Yeo Martial

No.	Pos.	Player	Date of birth (age)	Caps	Club
1	GK	Zagouli Gbolié	1961 (age 27)		(Ivory Coast) Africa Sports
16	GK	Alain Gouaméné	15 June 1966 (aged 21)		(Ivory Coast) ASEC Mimosas
6	DF	Sékana Diaby	10 August 1968 (aged 19)		(France) Laval
	DF	Boris Diecket	31 March 1963 (aged 24)		(France) Tours
3	DF	Arsène Hobou	30 October 1967 (aged 20)		(Ivory Coast) ASEC Mimosas
2	DF	Aka Kouamé	6 April 1963 (aged 24)		(Ivory Coast) ASEC Mimosas
13	DF	Patrice Lago			(Ivory Coast) Africa Sports
5	DF	Rufin Lué	5 January 1968 (aged 20)		(Ivory Coast) Africa Sports
12	DF	Laurent Zahui	10 August 1960 (aged 27)		(France) Rodez
8	MF	Oumar Ben Salah	2 July 1964 (aged 23)		(France) Sète
7	MF	Saint-Joseph Gadji-Celi	1 May 1961 (aged 26)		(France) Sète
9	MF	Youssouf Fofana	26 July 1966 (aged 21)		(France) AS Monaco
17	MF	Serge Maguy	20 October 1970 (aged 17)		(Ivory Coast) Africa Sports
18	MF	Pascal Miézan	3 April 1959 (aged 28)		(Ivory Coast) Africa Sports
	MF	Didier Otokoré	26 March 1969 (aged 18)		(France) Auxerre
15	MF	François Zahoui	21 August 1962 (aged 25)		(France) Toulon
14	FW	Ignace Guédé-Gba	10 October 1964 (aged 23)		(Ivory Coast) Africa Sports
10	FW	Abdoulaye Traoré	4 March 1967 (aged 21)		(France) Sète
4	FW	Yao Lambert Amani	17 September 1963 (aged 24)		(Ivory Coast) Africa Sports

=== Morocco ===
Coach: (Brazil) José Faria

No.	Pos.	Player	Date of birth (age)	Caps	Club
1	GK	Badou Zaki (c)	2 April 1959 (aged 28)		(Spain) RCD Mallorca
22	GK	Khalil Azmi	23 August 1964 (aged 23)		(Morocco) Wydad Casablanca
4	DF	Mustapha El Biyaz	12 December 1960 (aged 27)		(Portugal) F.C. Penafiel
2	DF	Tijani El Maataoui	17 December 1963 (aged 24)		(Morocco) Raja Casablanca
3	DF	Abdelmajid Lamriss	12 February 1959 (aged 29)		(Morocco) FAR Rabat
18	MF	Hassan Benabicha	15 April 1964 (aged 23)		(Morocco) Wydad Casablanca
8	MF	Aziz Bouderbala	26 December 1960 (aged 27)		(Switzerland) FC Sion
6	MF	Abdelmajid Dolmy	19 April 1953 (aged 34)		(Morocco) CLAS Casablanca
7	MF	Mustafa El Haddaoui	28 July 1961 (aged 26)		(France) AS Saint-Étienne
17	MF	Abderrazak Khairi	20 November 1962 (aged 25)		(Morocco) FAR Rabat
10	MF	Mohamed Timoumi	15 January 1960 (aged 28)		(Belgium) KSC Lokeren
16	FW	Moulay Hachem El Gharef	30 June 1965 (aged 22)		(Spain) CD Tenerife
19	FW	Hassan Fadil	3 February 1963 (aged 25)		(Spain) RCD Mallorca
9	FW	Abdelkrim Merry "Krimau"	13 January 1955 (aged 33)		(France) Matra Racing
20	FW	Hassan Nader	8 July 1965 (aged 22)		(Morocco) Wydad Casablanca
21	MF	Abderrahim Hamraoui	11 September 1960 (aged 27)		(Morocco) Raja Casablanca
13	DF	Mourad Jabrane			(Morocco) Maghreb Fes
12	MF	Mustapha Kiddi	16 January 1964 (aged 24)		(Morocco) Kawkab
15	DF	Hassan Mouahid	26 February 1960 (aged 28)		(Morocco) Raja Casablanca
14	DF	Lahcen Ouadani	14 February 1959 (aged 29)		(Morocco) FAR Rabat

=== Zaire ===
Coach: (Germany) Otto Pfister

No.	Pos.	Player	Date of birth (age)	Caps	Club
2	GK	Mpangi Merikani	4 April 1967 (aged 20)		(Zaire) DC Motema Pembe
15	DF	John Buana N'Galula	23 June 1968 (aged 19)		(Belgium) Boom FC
	DF	Abayi Kalau			(Zaire)
8	MF	Mbaki Makengo	13 April 1964 (aged 24)		(Zaire)
5	DF	Tshota Mutombo			(Zaire)
	DF	Mansoni Ngombo	25 October 1963 (aged 24)		(Belgium) Beerschot
	DF	Kalombo N'Kongolo	17 July 1961 (aged 26)		(Portugal) S.C. Espinho
	MF	Lemba Basuala	3 March 1965 (aged 23)		(Portugal) O Elvas
6	MF	Jacques Kinkomba Kingambo	4 January 1962 (aged 26)		(Belgium) Sint-Truiden
19	MF	Morceau Lutonadio di Vita	5 June 1965 (aged 22)		(Belgium) Beerschot
16	MF	Tueba Menayane	13 March 1963 (aged 25)		(Portugal) S.L. Benfica
20	MF	Jean-Santos Muntubila	20 December 1958 (aged 29)		(France) SC Bastia
12	MF	N'Dinga Mbote	11 September 1966 (aged 21)		(Portugal) Vitória Guimarães
18	FW	Eugène Kabongo	3 November 1960 (aged 27)		(France) Olympique Lyonnais
	FW	Richard Mapuata N'Kiambi	27 February 1965 (aged 23)		(Portugal) Belenenses
7	FW	Gaston Mobati	4 September 1961 (aged 26)		(France) Lille OSC
	FW	Monduone N'Kama	28 July 1960 (aged 27)		(Portugal) Vitória Guimarães

== Group B ==
=== Cameroon ===
Coach: (France) Claude Le Roy

No.	Pos.	Player	Date of birth (age)	Caps	Club
1	GK	Joseph-Antoine Bell	8 October 1954 (aged 33)		(France) Olympique de Marseille
16	GK	Jacques Songo'o	17 March 1964 (aged 23)		(Cameroon) Canon Yaoundé
21	DF	Richard Abena	25 May 1960 (aged 27)		(Cameroon) Canon Yaoundé
6	DF	Emmanuel Kundé	15 July 1956 (aged 31)		(France) Laval
4	DF	Benjamin Massing	20 June 1962 (aged 25)		(France) US Creteil
5	DF	Victor Ndip Akem	18 August 1967 (aged 20)		(Cameroon) Canon Yaounde
20	DF	Charles Ntamark	22 July 1964 (aged 23)		(England) Boreham Wood
14	DF	Stephen Tataw	31 March 1963 (aged 24)		(Cameroon) Tonnerre Yaoundé
2	MF	André Kana-Biyik	1 September 1965 (aged 22)		(Cameroon) Diamant Yaoundé
8	MF	Emile Mbouh-Mbouh	30 May 1966 (aged 21)		(Cameroon) Diamant Yaoundé
10	MF	Louis-Paul Mfédé	26 February 1961 (aged 27)		(Cameroon) Canon Yaoundé
19	MF	Bertin Ollé Ollé	30 November 1961 (aged 26)		(Cameroon) Tonnerre Yaoundé
18	FW	Bonaventure Djonkep	20 August 1961 (aged 26)		(Cameroon) Union Douala
	FW	Eugène Ekéké	30 May 1960 (aged 27)		(France) Stade Quimperois
12	FW	Cyril Makanaky	28 June 1965 (aged 22)		(France) SC Toulon
17	FW	Jean-Denis Mandengué			(Cameroon) Aigle Nkongsamba
9	FW	Roger Milla	20 May 1952 (aged 35)		(France) Montpellier HSC
	FW	François Omam-Biyik	21 May 1966 (aged 21)		(France) Stade Lavallois
13	DF	Bertin Ebwellé	11 September 1962 (aged 25)		(Cameroon) Tonnerre Yaoundé

=== Egypt ===
Coach: (England) Mike Smith

No.	Pos.	Player	Date of birth (age)	Caps	Club
1	GK	Thabet El-Batal	16 September 1953 (aged 34)		(Egypt) Al-Ahly
2	DF	Ibrahim Hassan	10 August 1966 (aged 21)		(Egypt) Al Ahly
3	DF	Rabie Yassin	7 September 1960 (aged 27)		(Egypt) Al Ahly
4	DF	Mohamed Omar	3 September 1958 (aged 29)		(Egypt) Al-Ittihad Alexandria
5	DF	Hamada Sedki	25 August 1961 (aged 26)		(Egypt) Al Ahly
6	MF	Ayman Younes	20 February 1964 (aged 24)		(Egypt) Zamalek
7	MF	Ismail Youssef	28 June 1964 (aged 23)		(Egypt) Zamalek
8	MF	Shawky Ghareeb	26 February 1959 (aged 29)		(Egypt) Ghazl El-Mehalla
9	FW	Hossam Hassan	10 August 1966 (aged 21)		(Egypt) Al Ahly
10	FW	Gamal Abdelhamid	24 November 1957 (aged 30)		(Egypt) Zamalek
11	FW	Emad Soliman	23 July 1959 (aged 28)		(Egypt) Ismaily SC
12	GK	Ahmed Shobair	28 September 1960 (aged 27)		(Egypt) Al Ahly
13	DF	Ahmed Ramzy	25 October 1965 (aged 22)	27	(Egypt) Zamalek
14	DF	Mohamed Saad	10 February 1965 (aged 23)		(Egypt) Al-Ahly
15	FW	Mohamed Ramadan	15 November 1970 (aged 17)		(Egypt) Tersana SC
16	DF	Ashraf Kasem	25 July 1966 (aged 21)		(Egypt) Zamalek
17	MF	Osama Orabi	25 January 1962 (aged 26)		(Egypt) Al Ahly
18	MF	Tarek Soliman	24 January 1962 (aged 26)		(Egypt) Al Masry SC
19	DF	Hesham Yakan	10 August 1962 (aged 25)		(Egypt) Zamalek
20	MF	Tarek Yehia	10 September 1961 (aged 26)		(Egypt) Zamalek
21	FW	Ahmed El-Kass	8 July 1965 (aged 22)	42	(Egypt) El-Olympi Alexandria
22	GK	Ayman Taher	7 January 1966 (aged 22)	?	(Egypt) Zamalek

=== Kenya ===
Coach: Chris Makokha

No.	Pos.	Player	Date of birth (age)	Caps	Club
	GK	Washington Muhanji			(Kenya) AFC Leopards
	GK	David Ochieng	1960 (age 28)		(Kenya) Gor Mahia
	DF	Wycliffe Anyangu			(Kenya) AFC Leopards
	DF	Hassan Juma			(Kenya) AFC Leopards
	DF	Tobias Ocholla	1963 (age 25)		(Kenya) Gor Mahia
	DF	Austin Oduor			(Kenya) Gor Mahia
	DF	Gabriel Olang			(Kenya) AFC Leopards
	DF	Mickey Weche			(Kenya) AFC Leopards
	MF	George Adembo			(Kenya) Gor Mahia
	MF	Wilberforce Mulamba			(Kenya) AFC Leopards
	MF	Douglas Mutua	30 May 1962 (aged 25)		Kenya Breweries
	MF	Paul Ochieng	1967 (age 21)		(Kenya) Gor Mahia
	MF	John Okelo	1965 (age 23)		(Kenya) AFC Leopards
	MF	George Onyango			(Kenya) Gor Mahia
	MF	Sammy Onyango	3 March 1961 (aged 27)		(Kenya) Gor Mahia
	FW	Sammy Ayoyi			(Kenya)
	FW	Peter Dawo	1964 (age 24)		(Kenya) Gor Mahia
	FW	Henry Motego	21 May 1964 (aged 23)		(Kenya) Shabana Kisii
	FW	David Odhiambo			(Kenya)

=== Nigeria ===
Coach: (Germany) Manfred Honer

No.	Pos.	Player	Date of birth (age)	Caps	Club
1	GK	Peter Rufai	24 August 1963 (aged 24)		(Belgium) K.S.C. Lokeren
2	DF	Uche Okafor	8 August 1967 (aged 20)		(Nigeria) ACB Lagos
4	DF	Stephen Keshi	31 January 1962 (aged 26)		(Belgium) R.S.C. Anderlecht
5	DF	Yisa Sofoluwe	28 December 1967 (aged 20)		(Nigeria) Abiola Babes
6	MF	Michael Odu	24 February 1966 (aged 22)		(Nigeria) El-Kanemi Warriors
7	FW	Humphrey Edobor	12 March 1966 (aged 22)		(Nigeria) New Nigerian Bank
8	MF	Samuel Okwaraji	19 May 1964 (aged 23)		(West Germany) VfB Stuttgart
10	MF	Henry Nwosu	14 June 1963 (aged 24)		(Nigeria) ACB Lagos
12	DF	Augustine Eguavoen	19 August 1965 (aged 22)		(Belgium) K.A.A. Gent
13	DF	Bright Omokaro	24 February 1965 (aged 23)		(Nigeria) Flash Flamingoes
14	FW	Rashidi Yekini	23 October 1963 (aged 24)		(Ivory Coast) Africa Sports
15	DF	Sunday Eboigbe	30 January 1955 (aged 33)		(Nigeria) El-Kanemi Warriors
16	DF	Andrew Uwe	12 October 1967 (aged 20)		(Nigeria) Leventis United
17	MF	Folorunso Okenla	9 October 1967 (aged 20)		(Nigeria) Shooting Stars
18	FW	Ndubuisi Okosieme	28 September 1966 (aged 21)		(Nigeria) Flash Flamingoes
	FW	Michael Obiku	24 September 1968 (aged 19)		(Nigeria) Iwuanyanwu Nationale
	FW	Joseph Oluwole Odegbami	5 October 1962 (aged 25)		(Nigeria) Plateau United
11	MF	Ademola Adeshina	4 June 1964 (aged 23)		(Nigeria) Shooting Stars
