= Football at the 1964 Summer Olympics – Men's African Qualifiers – Group 3 =

The 1964 Summer Olympics football qualification – Africa Group 3 was one of the three African groups in the Summer Olympics football qualification tournament to decide which teams would qualify for the 1964 Summer Olympics football finals tournament in Japan. Group 3 consisted of four teams: Ethiopia, Kenya, Morocco and Nigeria. The teams played home-and-away knockout matches. Morocco qualified for the Summer Olympics football finals after defeating Ethiopia 2–0 on aggregate in the second round.

== Summary ==
Team 1	Agg.	Team 2	1st leg	2nd leg
First round
Kenya	5–10	Ethiopia	4–3	1–7
Nigeria	4–4	Morocco	3–0	1–4
First round play-off
Morocco	2–1	Nigeria		
Second round
Ethiopia	0–2	Morocco	0–1	0–1

== First round ==
12 October 1963

Kenya	4–3	Ethiopia
Nicodemus 7'; Sungura 9'; Kajo 30'; Arudhi 70'	Report	Gerile (?), 80'; Wolde (?)

Nairobi City Stadium, Nairobi
13 November 1963

Ethiopia	7–1	Kenya
Abdo 2'; Worku 10', 24', 37', 56', 70'; Araya (?)	Report	Kajo (?)

Haillé Selassié Stadium, Addis Ababa

Ethiopia won 10–5 on aggregate and advanced to the second round.

16 November 1963

Nigeria	3–0	Morocco
Ekpe (?); Hamilton (?)	Report

Surulere Stadium, Lagos
Attendance: 40,000
8 March 1964

Morocco	4–1	Nigeria
Lamari 42', 89'; Owowon 59' (o.g.); Bendayan 66'	Report	Hamilton 35'

Stade d'Honneur, Casablanca
Attendance: 15,000

Nigeria and Morocco tied 4–4 on aggregate and advanced to a play-off.

=== Play-off ===
28 March 1964

Morocco	2–1	Nigeria
Bamous (?)	Report	(?)

Stade Demba Diop, Dakar
Attendance: 5,000

Morocco won the play-off and advanced to the second round.

== Second round ==
10 May 1964

Ethiopia	0–1	Morocco
	Report	Bendayan 80'

Haillé Selassié Stadium, Addis Ababa
Attendance: 35,000
24 May 1964

Morocco	1–0	Ethiopia
Bouachra 75'	Report

Stade d'Honneur, Casablanca
Attendance: 10,000

Morocco won 2–0 on aggregate and qualified for the Summer Olympics.

== Goalscorers ==
There were 28 goals scored in 7 matches, for an average of 4 goals per match.

5 goals

- * (Ethiopia national football team) Mengistu Worku

2 goals

- (Ethiopia national football team) Gerile
- (Kenya national football team) Ali Kajo
- (Nigeria national football team) Asuquo Ekpe
- (Nigeria national football team) Paul Ebiye Hamilton
- (Morocco national football team) Mohamed Lamari
- (Morocco national football team) Driss Bamous
- (Morocco national football team) Ali Bendayan

1 goal

- (Kenya national football team) Daniel Nicodemus
- (Kenya national football team) Ali Sungura
- (Kenya national football team) Nicodemus Arudhi
- (Ethiopia national football team) Getachew Wolde
- (Ethiopia national football team) Abdo
- (Ethiopia national football team) Kiflom Araya
- (Morocco national football team) Ali Bouachra

1 own goal

- (Nigeria national football team) Owowon
