= 2001 CECAFA Cup =

Tournament details
- Host country: Rwanda
- Dates: 8–22 December
- Teams: 11 (from CECAFA confederations)

Final positions
- Champions: Ethiopia (2nd title)
- Runners-up: Kenya
- Third place: Rwanda A

Tournament statistics
- Matches played: 23
- Goals scored: 69 (3 per match)
- Top scorer(s): (Uganda) Alex Isabirye (5 goals)

The 2001 CECAFA Cup was the 25th edition of the football tournament that involves teams from East and Central Africa. The matches were played in Rwanda, who had last hosted the competition two years before, in 1999. All the matches at the tournament were played from 8 December 2001, when Rwanda beat Somalia, until the 22 December 2001, when both the final and third place play-off were hosted. Prior to the tournament, Sudan withdrew their participation, and as such were suspended from all CECAFA tournaments in the future on an indefinite basis. However, the suspension was lifted in time for the 2002 CECAFA Cup.

Eleven teams entered the tournament, two more than had competed at the previous edition. There were, however, only ten countries competing at the 2001 Cup, as the hosts, Rwanda, entered Rwanda (A) and Rwanda (B). The last time Rwanda had hosted the tournament, in 1999, they had similarly entered two teams: Rwanda (A) finished third, beating Burundi in the third place play-off, and Rwanda (B) won the competition, beating Kenya 3 - 1 in the final. There were similar fortunes at the 2001 CECAFA Cup for Rwanda, as both teams qualified from their groups in second place, the tournament's set-up meaning that the two Rwandan sides could compete in the final against each other if they progressed thus far, as both Ugandan sides did at the 2000 tournament. Although Tanzania and Uganda were both beaten in the quarter-finals by Rwanda in 2001, in the semifinals both Rwanda sides lost to Ethiopia, and Kenya, the side Rwanda (A) had beaten in 1999 to clinch the title. The two Rwanda sides therefore met in the third place play-off in 2001, and after it finished 1 - 1 after normal time, Rwanda (A) won 5 - 3 in a penalty shoot out. The two teams in the final, Kenya and Ethiopia, both won their groups (group A and group C respectively). 2001 was a good year for Ethiopia, not only did they beat Kenya 2 - 1 in the CECAFA Cup final, but their under-20 team qualified for the Argentinian-held 2001 FIFA World Youth Championship, this was the first time Ethiopia had qualified for the event. When they did reach the final, Ethiopia had never lost a CECAFA Cup final having played one prior to the occasion, but to this day Ethiopia still have not lost when they have reached the final, an event which has occurred four times. Uganda's 10 - 1 demolition of Djibouti was the biggest winning margin in the CECAFA Cup's history.

== Background ==
The CECAFA Cup is considered Africa's oldest football tournament, and involves teams from Central and Southern Africa. The tournament was originally named the Gossage Cup, contested by the four nations of Kenya, Uganda, Tanganyika (modern day Tanzania), and Zanzibar, running from 1929 until 1965. In 1967, this became the East and Central African Senior Challenge Cup, often shortened to simply the Challenge Cup, which was competed for five years, until 1971, before the CECAFA Cup was introduced in 1973. The 2000 champions were Uganda (A), in 2001 Uganda scraped through their group in the third and final qualifying position; they were 3 points behind Burundi and 6 behind Tanzzania, but they were then knocked out in the quarter-finals against Rwanda (A). The 2001 champions, Ethiopia, were knocked out in the 2000 semifinals by Uganda (B), though beat Rwanda to achieve third place.

== Participants ==
11 teams from 9 countries competed, four teams from the original tournament (excluding Tanganyika, which changed names and is currently called Tanzania), including all 8 nations who competed at the 2000 CECAFA Cup in addition to Tanzania and Zanzibar.

- Burundi
- Djibouti
- Eritrea
- Ethiopia
- Kenya
- Rwanda A
- Rwanda B
- Somalia
- Tanzania
- Uganda
- Zanzibar

== Group stage ==
The group stage began on 8 December and ended on 15 December with Group A's final match between Rwanda (A) and Kenya, and Group C's final match between Rwanda (B) and Ethiopia. At the end of the group stage, the teams who finished bottom of their group were eliminated, along with the team which finished in third and received the worst number of points contrasted with the other teams finishing third in the other groups. Owing to there being an odd number of teams, Group C contained one less team, with a total of three, and therefore a reduced schedule, hosting only three matches to Group A and B's six.

If two or more teams are equal on points on completion of the group matches, the following criteria are applied to determine the rankings (in descending order):

1. Number of points obtained in games between the teams involved;
2. Goal difference in games between the teams involved;
3. Goals scored in games between the teams involved;
4. Away goals scored in games between the teams involved;
5. Goal difference in all games;
6. Goals scored in all games;
7. Drawing of lots.

Key to colours in group tables
Top two teams in each group qualify for the knock-out stages
Top two third placed teams qualify for the knock-out stages
Team eliminated

=== Group A ===
Team	Pld	W	D	L	GF	GA	GD	Pts
Kenya	3	2	1	0	5	1	+4	7
Rwanda A	3	2	1	0	4	0	+4	7
Eritrea	3	0	1	2	1	3	−2	1
Somalia	3	0	1	2	0	6	−6	1

8 December 2001

Rwanda A	3–0	Somalia
Milli 5', 60'; Karekezi 70'

Amahoro Stadium, Kigali

10 December 2001

Kenya	2–1	Eritrea
Juma 75'; Sunguti 85'		Shimangus 38'

Amahoro Stadium, Kigali

12 December 2001

Kenya	3–0	Somalia
Mambo 34', 45'; Mulama 47'

Amahoro Stadium, Kigali

12 December 2001

Rwanda A	1–0	Eritrea
Muhayimana 62'

Amahoro Stadium, Kigali

14 December 2001

Somalia	0–0	Eritrea

Amahoro Stadium, Kigali

15 December 2001

Rwanda A	0–0	Kenya

Amahoro Stadium, Kigali

=== Group B ===
Team	Pld	W	D	L	GF	GA	GD	Pts
Tanzania	3	3	0	0	7	2	+5	9
Burundi	3	2	0	1	6	3	+3	6
Uganda	3	1	0	2	10	3	+7	3
Djibouti	3	0	0	3	3	17	−14	0

9 December 2001

Uganda	10–1	Djibouti
Isabirye 24', 36', 55'; Nadduli 26'; Kabeta 57'; Nsubuga 68'; Otika 75'; Kabanda 80'; Kizito 90'; Kasule 90+1'		Said 77'

Amahoro Stadium, Kigali

9 December 2001

Tanzania	2–1	Burundi
Macho 24'; Tondolawere 30'		Kubi 56'

Amahoro Stadium, Kigali

11 December 2001

Burundi	3–1	Djibouti
Kubi 40'; Karimbi 65', 75'		Robleh 57'

Amahoro Stadium, Kigali

11 December 2001

Tanzania	1–0	Uganda
Maulidi 56'

Amahoro Stadium, Kigali

13 December 2001

Djibouti	1–4	Tanzania
Ismael 75'		Kasonso 7'; Gabriel 49'; Nyagawa 52'; Mwansasu 67'

Amahoro Stadium, Kigali

14 December 2001

Uganda	0–2	Burundi
		Kubi 7', 12'

Amahoro Stadium, Kigali

=== Group C ===
Team	Pld	W	D	L	GF	GA	GD	Pts
Ethiopia	2	1	1	0	6	1	+5	4
Rwanda B	2	1	1	0	4	1	+3	4
Zanzibar	2	0	0	2	0	8	−8	0

10 December 2001

Rwanda B	3–0	Zanzibar

Amahoro Stadium, Kigali

13 December 2001

Ethiopia	5–0	Zanzibar
Tadesse 15'; Afework 35'; Yordanos 60'; Fekadu; Bayou	Report

Amahoro Stadium, Kigali

15 December 2001

Rwanda B	1–1	Ethiopia
Gatete 52'	Report	Bayou 35'

Amahoro Stadium, Kigali

== Knock-out stage ==
Quarter-finals
December 17
Kenya	1
Eritrea	0
December 17
Tanzania	1
Rwanda B	2
December 18
Rwanda A	3
Uganda	2
December 18
Ethiopia (pen.)	2 (5)
Burundi	2 (4)

Semi-finals
December 20
Kenya	3
Rwanda B	1
December 20
Ethiopia	1
Rwanda A	0

Final
December 22
Ethiopia	2
Kenya	1
Third place
December 22
Rwanda A (pen.)	1 (5)
Rwanda B	1 (3)

=== Quarter-finals ===
17 December 2001

Kenya	1–0	Eritrea
Aguda 89'

17 December 2001

Tanzania	1–2	Rwanda B
Macho 5'		Witakenge 1'; Kombi 56'

18 December 2001

Rwanda A	3–2	Uganda
Nshimiyimana 27', 65'; Muhayimana 29'		Isabirye 25', 47'

18 December 2001

Ethiopia	2–2	Burundi
Yordanos 30'; Bayou 65'	Report	Karimbi 82'; Kubi 87'
Penalties
	5–4

=== Semifinals ===
20 December 2001

Kenya	3–1	Rwanda B
Sunguti 8', 71'; Maruti 56'		Mbusa 16'

20 December 2001

Ethiopia	1–0	Rwanda A
Bayou 7'	Report

=== Third place play-off ===
22 December 2001

Rwanda A	1–1	Rwanda B
Penalties
	5–3

=== Final ===
22 December 2001

Ethiopia	2–1	Kenya
Yordanos 8'; Mamoalem 37'	Report	Mulama 67' (pen.)

CECAFA Cup 2001 winners

Ethiopia
Second title

== Team statistics ==
Teams are ranked using the same tie-breaking criteria as in the group stage, except for the top four teams.

Pos.	Team	Pld	W	D	L	Pts	GF	GA	GD
1	Ethiopia	5	3	2	0	11	11	4	+7
2	Kenya	6	4	1	1	13	10	4	+6
**Third-place play-off**
3	Rwanda (A)	6	3	2	1	11	8	4	+4
4	Rwanda (B)	5	2	2	1	8	8	6	+2
**Eliminated in the knock-out stages**
5	Tanzania	4	3	0	1	9	8	4	+4
6	Burundi	4	2	1	1	7	8	5	+3
7	Uganda	4	1	0	3	3	12	7	+5
8	Eritrea	4	0	1	3	1	1	4	−3
**Eliminated in the group stages**
9	Somalia	3	0	1	2	1	0	6	−6
10	Zanzibar	2	0	0	2	0	0	8	−8
11	Djibouti	3	0	0	3	0	3	17	−14
Total		10^{(1)}	6	4^{(2)}	6	26	28	28	0

Updated to games played on 22 December 2001. Team(s) rendered in italics represent(s) the host nation(s). The competition's winning team is rendered in bold.
^{(1)} – Total games lost not counted in total games played (total games lost = total games won)
^{(2)} – Total number of games drawn (tied) for all teams = Total number of games drawn (tied) ÷ 2 (both teams involved)
^{(3)} – As per statistical convention in football, matches decided in extra time are counted as wins and losses, while matches decided by penalty shoot-outs are counted as draws.
