= Ali Sungura =

Kenyan footballer

Personal information
- Full name: Ali Sungura
- Place of birth: Kenya
- Positions: Wing; midfielder

Senior career*
Years	Team	Apps	(Gls)
- Feisal F.C.

International career
- Kenya
- * Club domestic league appearances and goals

Ali Sungura was a Kenyan footballer who played in midfield or as a winger for a number of clubs and for the Kenyan national team in the 1950s and 60s. He started his career at Feisal F.C. in Mombasa, Kenya and is mentioned as a significant player during the Golden era of 'Coast Football' within Kenya's early years as a country. He was a talented player, mentioned in the autobiography of Joe Kadenge, his national teammate as one of only two players who could 'match to his skills'.

== Career ==
=== Club career ===
Ali Sungura was well known throughout Kenya as one of the greatest players of his era in many accounts of 50's Kenyan football. At Feisal F.C. he was described as a 'fleet-footed' winger and developed a strong partnership with fellow Kenyan national player Ali Kajo, who played in a more defensive midfield role, with the two players being affectionately named the 'Ali boys' by fans.

=== International career ===
There are few records dating the exact appearances of Kenyan players for the national team, and many international matches were friendlies in the 1950s as this was prior to Kenya's independence in 1963. However, from personal accounts of Kenyan football at the time it is clear that he was a frequent player, having 'done Kenya proud' playing for the team. He took part in the 1962 Ugandan Independence Tournament, scoring twice in a 3-3 draw with Isthmian League 'all-star' team from England.
