= Mulama =

Mulama is a surname. Notable people with the surname include:

- Simeon Mulama (born 1980), Kenyan footballer
- Titus Mulama (born 1980), Kenyan footballer
