= Fabisch =

Fabisch is a surname. Notable people with the surname includes:

- Jonah Fabisch (born 2001), Kenyan-born Zimbabwean footballer
- Joseph-Hugues Fabisch (1812–1886), French sculptor
- Reinhard Fabisch (1950–2008), German football manager and player
