= 2024–25 FC Erzgebirge Aue season =

FC Erzgebirge Aue
2024–25 season
- Manager: Pavel Dotchev
- Stadium: Erzgebirgsstadion
- 3. Liga: Pre-season
- DFB-Pokal: First round
- Saxony Cup: First round

The 2024–25 season is the 79th season in the history of FC Erzgebirge Aue, and the club's third consecutive season in 3. Liga. In addition to the domestic league, the team is scheduled to participate in the Saxony Cup.

== Transfers ==
=== In ===
Pos.	Player	Transferred from	Fee	Date	Source
MF	(Germany) Can Özkan	(Germany) Arminia Bielefeld	Undisclosed	1 July 2024	
MF	(Zimbabwe) Jonah Fabisch	(Germany) 1. FC Magdeburg	Undisclosed	1 July 2024	
DF	(Austria) Pascal Fallmann	(Austria) Rapid Wien	Undisclosed	1 July 2024	
FW	(Germany) Ricky Bornschein	(Germany) Greuther Fürth II	Free	1 July 2024	
MF	(Germany) Mika Clausen	(Germany) FC St. Pauli II	Free	1 July 2024	
DF	(Germany) Maxim Burghardt	(Germany) Eintracht Trier	€20,000	1 July 2024	
DF	(Germany) Tim Hoffmann	(Germany) Hertha BSC	Loan	8 July 2024	
MF	(Morocco) Ali Loune	(Germany) 1. FC Nürnberg	Loan	20 August 2024	

== Friendlies ==
=== Pre-season ===
29 June 2024 Friendly	Fortschritt Münchenbernsdorf (Germany)	0–12	(Germany) Erzgebirge Aue	Münchenbernsdorf

30 June 2024 Friendly	Oelsnitzer FC (Germany)	0–12	(Germany) Erzgebirge Aue	Oelsnitz
14:00 UTC+2		Report

6 July 2024 Friendly	Erzgebirge Aue (Germany)	5–0	(Northern Ireland) Glenavon	Aue-Bad Schlema
14:00				Stadium: Erzgebirgsstadion

9 July 2024 Friendly	Erzgebirge Aue (Germany)	0–4	(Germany) ZFC Meuselwitz
16:30

12 July 2024 Friendly	VFC Plauen (Germany)	0–4	(Germany) Erzgebirge Aue
15:00			Jakob 20', 22'; Bär 40'; Tashchy 67'

17 July 2024 Friendly	Erzgebirge Aue (Germany)	1–1	(Germany) Borussia Dortmund
18:00	Seitz 82'		Benkara 20'

20 July 2024 Friendly	Erzgebirge Aue (Germany)	1–3	(Germany) Carl Zeiss Jena
14:00

26 July 2024 Friendly	RB Leipzig (Germany)	v	(Germany) Erzgebirge Aue

== Competitions ==
=== Overall record ===
Competition	First match	Last match	Starting round	Final position	Record							
Competition	First match	Last match	Starting round	Final position	Pld	W	D	L	GF	GA	GD	Win %
3. Liga	3 August 2024	17 May 2025	Matchday 1		9	5	1	3	14	12	+2	55.56
DFB-Pokal	17 August 2024	17 August 2024	First round	First round	1	0	0	1	1	3	−2	0.00
Saxony Cup	13 October 2024		Third round		1	1	0	0	2	0	+2	100.00
Total					11	6	1	4	17	15	+2	54.55

Source: Soccerway

=== 3. Liga ===
==== League table ====
Pos	Team	Pld	W	D	L	GF	GA	GD	Pts
11	1860 Munich	38	15	8	15	57	61	−4	53
12	Alemannia Aachen	38	12	14	12	44	44	0	50
13	Erzgebirge Aue	38	15	5	18	52	65	−13	50
14	VfL Osnabrück	38	13	9	16	46	55	−9	48
15	VfB Stuttgart II (Note: Reserve teams are ineligible for promotion or DFB-Pokal qualification.)	38	12	11	15	49	59	−10	47

Source: DFB
Rules for classification: 1) Points; 2) Goal difference; 3) Goals scored; 4) Head-to-head results; 5) Head-to-head away goals scored; 6) Away goals scored; 7) Play-off.

==== Matches ====
The match schedule was released on 9 July 2024.

3 August 2024 1	Erzgebirge Aue	2–1	Hannover 96 II	Aue
14:00	Stefaniak 9'; Bär 22'	Report	Sanne 15'	Stadium: Erzgebirgsstadion; Attendance: 6,867; Referee: Leonidas Exuzidis

10 August 2024 2	VfL Osnabrück	0–2	Erzgebirge Aue	Osnabrück
14:00		Report	Clausen 57'; Tashchy 87'	Stadium: Stadion an der Bremer Brücke; Attendance: 13,517; Referee: Florian Exner

23 August 2024 3	Erzgebirge Aue	2–0	Dynamo Dresden	Aue
19:00	Pepić 6'; Stefaniak 9'	Report		Stadium: Erzgebirgsstadion; Attendance: 14,788; Referee: Lukas Benen

31 August 2024 4	Alemannia Aachen	1–2	Erzgebirge Aue	Aachen
14:00	El-Faouzi 1'	Report	Bär 58', 84'	Stadium: New Tivoli; Attendance: 23,300; Referee: Cristian Ballweg

15 September 2024 5	Erzgebirge Aue	1–3	Arminia Bielefeld	Aue
13:30	Stefaniak 27' (pen.)	Report	Russo 55'; Corboz 61'; Wörl 78'	Stadium: Erzgebirgsstadion; Attendance: 10,111; Referee: Florian Heft

20 September 2024 6	SpVgg Unterhaching	2–2	Erzgebirge Aue	Unterhaching
19:00	Maier 61'; Jastremski 64'	Report	Bär 42'; Nkansah 90+5'	Stadium: Sportpark Unterhaching; Attendance: 5,256; Referee: Daniel Bartnitzki

24 September 2024 7	Erzgebirge Aue	2–1	SV Wehen Wiesbaden	Aue
19:00	Stefaniak 11'; Clausen 33'	Report	Flotho 89'	Stadium: Erzgebirgsstadion; Attendance: 6,552; Referee: Jarno Wienefeld

28 September 2024 8	Viktoria Köln	2–0	Erzgebirge Aue	Cologne
14:00	Lofolomo 42'; El Mala 90+4'	Report		Stadium: Sportpark Höhenberg; Attendance: 3,057; Referee: Felix Grund

5 October 2024 9	Erzgebirge Aue	1–2	Hansa Rostock	Aue
14:00	Jakob 12'	Report	Haugen 32'; Gürleyen 90+1'	Stadium: Erzgebirgsstadion; Attendance: 13,218; Referee: Eric Weisbach

18 October 2024 10	Waldhof Mannheim	3–0	Erzgebirge Aue	Mannheim
19:00	Boyd 32'; Janne Sietan (yellow card) 38'; Arase 77'; Samuel Abifade (yellow card) 89'; Okpala 90+4'	Report	Sean Seitz (yellow card) 90+2'	Stadium: Carl-Benz-Stadion; Attendance: 11,334; Referee: (Germany) Fabienne Michel

22 October 2024 11	Erzgebirge Aue	1–3	Energie Cottbus	Aue
19:00	Majetschak 44'	Report	Thiele 30' 90+4'; Ciğerci 81'; Rorig (yellow card) 90+8'	Stadium: Erzgebirgsstadion; Attendance: 10,319; Referee: (Germany) Daniel Schlager

27 October 2024 12	Stuttgart II	0–1	Erzgebirge Aue	Aspach
16:30	Kaden Amaniampong (yellow card) 18'; Leon Reichardt (yellow card) 69'; Nartey (yellow card) 80'; Sessa (yellow card) 81'	Report	Bär 15'; Nkansah (yellow card) 57'; Fallmann (yellow card) 78'; Pepić (yellow card) 81'; Sijarić (yellow card) 90+1'	Stadium: WIRmachenDRUCK Arena; Attendance: 1,574; Referee: (Germany) Yannick Rupert

2 November 2024 13	Erzgebirge Aue	1–1	1. FC Saarbrücken	Aue
14:00 CET	Bär 18'; Stefaniak (yellow card) 82'; Maxim Burghardt (yellow card) 87'; Dochev (yellow card) 90+2'	Report	Becker (yellow card) 65'; Joel Bichsel (yellow card) 76'; Brünker 81'; Rizzuto (yellow card) 90'	Stadium: Erzgebirgsstadion; Attendance: 7,570; Referee: (Germany) Martin Speckner

10 November 2024 14	Erzgebirge Aue	2–1	Rot-Weiss Essen	Aue
16:30 CET	Fallmann 13' (yellow card) 51'; Stefaniak (yellow card) 31' (goal) 44'; Ali Loune (yellow card) 36'; Nkansah (yellow card) 86'	Report	Schultz (yellow card) 72'; Brumme (yellow card) 90+1' (yellow-red card) 90+4'; Arslan 90+3'	Stadium: Erzgebirgsstadion; Attendance: 7,832; Referee: (Germany) Felix Weller

24 November 2024 15	Borussia Dortmund II	3–1	Erzgebirge Aue	Dortmund
19:30 CET	Campbell 11'; Hettwer 27' 73'; Göbel (yellow card) 45'; Eberwein (yellow card) 54'	Report	Jakob 6'; Pepić (yellow card) 45'; Ali Loune (yellow card) 48'	Stadium: Stadion Rote Erde; Attendance: 1,525; Referee: (Germany) Felix Grund

=== DFB-Pokal ===
17 August 2024 First round	Erzgebirge Aue	1–3	Borussia Mönchengladbach	Aue
13:00	Clausen 8'	Report	Honorat 35'; Netz 52'; Pléa 70'	Stadium: Erzgebirgsstadion; Attendance: 14,811; Referee: Florian Badstübner

=== Saxony Cup ===
13 October 2024 Third round	VfB Annaberg 09	0–2	Erzgebirge Aue	Annaberg-Buchholz
14:00		Report	Sijarić 41'; Jakob 68'	Stadium: Kurt-Löser-Sportanlage; Attendance: 2,500; Referee: Lucas Leihkauf

17 November 2024 Round of 16	Tapfer Leipzig	0–7	Erzgebirge Aue
13:00		Report

22 March 2025 Quarter-finals	Chemnitzer FC	0–2	Erzgebirge Aue	Chemnitz
15:00 CET		Report		Stadium: Stadion an der Gellertstraße

17 April 2025 Semi-finals	Empor Glauchau	0–3	Erzgebirge Aue
16:30 CET		Report

24 May 2025 Final	1. FC Lokomotive Leipzig	0–0 (6–5 p)	Erzgebirge Aue	Leipzig
16:30 CET		Report		Stadium: Bruno-Plache-Stadion
