= Football at the 1987 All-Africa Games =

1987 All-Africa Games football tournament
Tournament details
- Host country: Kenya
- City: Nairobi
- Dates: 1–12 August
- Teams: 8 (from 1 confederation)
- Venue: 2 (in 1 host city)

Final positions
- Champions: Egypt (1st title)
- Runners-up: Kenya
- Third place: Malawi
- Fourth place: Cameroon

Tournament statistics
- Matches played: 18
- Goals scored: 43 (2.39 per match)

The 1987 All-Africa Games football tournament was the 4th edition of the African Games men's football tournament. The football tournament was held in Nairobi, Kenya between 1–12 August 1987 as part of the 1987 All-Africa Games.

== Qualification ==
Zone	Team
Hosts	Kenya
Zone I	Tunisia
Zone II	Senegal
Zone III	Ivory Coast
Zone IV	Cameroon
Zone V	Egypt
Zone VI	Malawi
Zone VII	Madagascar

== Final tournament ==
The eight teams were divided into two groups of four teams each. The two top teams from each group played the semifinals before the final match.

All times given as local time (UTC+3)

=== Group stage ===
Key to colours in group tables
Teams that advanced to the semifinals

==== Group A ====
Team	Pld	W	D	L	GF	GA	GD	Pts
Cameroon	3	2	1	0	9	4	+5	5
Kenya	3	2	1	0	6	4	+2	5
Madagascar	3	1	0	2	4	5	−1	2
Tunisia	3	0	0	3	1	7	−6	0

1 August 1987

Kenya	1–0	Tunisia
Ayoyi 86'

Kasarani Stadium, Nairobi
Attendance: 60,000
Referee: Idrissa Traoré (Mali)
1 August 1987

Cameroon	3–0	Madagascar
Ollé Ollé 5'; Kana-Biyik 36', 76'

Kasarani Stadium, Nairobi
Attendance: 60,000
Referee: Tesfaye Gebreyesus (Ethiopia)

3 August 1987

Kenya	3–3	Cameroon
Ayoyi 7'; Mulamba 72'; Weche 75'		Ollé Ollé 15'; Djonkep 70'; Massing 81'

Nyayo National Stadium, Nairobi
Referee: Rachid Medjiba (Algeria)
3 August 1987

Tunisia	0–3	Madagascar
		Razanatzimba 16', 54'; Andriantsitohaina 79'

Nyayo National Stadium, Nairobi
Referee: Badara Sène (Senegal)

5 August 1987

Kenya	2–1	Madagascar
Mulamba 56'; Odemba 88'		Dimbindrainy 13'

Nyayo National Stadium, Nairobi
Referee: Mohamed Hafez (Egypt)
5 August 1987

Cameroon	3–1	Tunisia
Tataw 3'; Kundé 30'; Ollé Ollé ?'		Jeridi 49' (pen.)

Nyayo National Stadium, Nairobi
Referee: Dodji Hounnaké-Kouassi (Togo)

==== Group B ====
Team	Pld	W	D	L	GF	GA	GD	Pts
Malawi	3	2	0	1	4	2	+2	4
Egypt	3	2	0	1	4	3	+1	4
Ivory Coast	3	2	0	1	3	2	+1	4
Senegal	3	0	0	3	0	4	−4	0

2 August 1987

Egypt	1–0	Senegal
Younes 64'

Nyayo National Stadium, Nairobi
Referee: Frank Valdemarca (Zimbabwe)
2 August 1987

Ivory Coast	1–0	Malawi
Amani 47'

Nyayo National Stadium, Nairobi
Referee: Ali Ben Nasser (Tunisia)

4 August 1987

Egypt	2–1	Ivory Coast
Abdel-Hameed 8', 63'		Bamba 27'

Kasarani Stadium, Nairobi
Referee: Joel Dwarf Mondoka (Zambia)
4 August 1987

Malawi	2–0	Senegal
Waya 12', 89'

Kasarani Stadium, Nairobi
Referee: Mohamed Abdel-Salam Gasmalla (Sudan)

6 August 1987

Ivory Coast	1–0	Senegal
Bamba 87'

Nyayo National Stadium, Nairobi
Referee: Guy Rakotoarison (Madagascar)
6 August 1987

Malawi	2–1	Egypt
Chimodzi 23'; Banda 87'		Ramadan 66'

Nyayo National Stadium, Nairobi
Referee: Albert Agbovi (Ghana)

=== Knockout stage ===
Fifth place
8 August – Nairobi
Ivory Coast (p)	1 (3)
Madagascar	1 (2)
Seventh place
8 August – Nairobi
Senegal	1
Tunisia	0

==== Seventh place match ====
8 August 1987

Senegal	1–0	Tunisia
Mendy

Nyayo National Stadium, Nairobi

==== Fifth place match ====
8 August 1987

Ivory Coast	1–1	Madagascar
Bamba		Goal
Penalties
	3–2

Nyayo National Stadium, Nairobi
Referee: William Ochieng (Kenya)

Semifinals
9 August – Nairobi
Cameroon	1 (3)
Egypt (p)	1 (4)
10 August – Nairobi
Malawi	1 (3)
Kenya (p)	1 (4)

Final
12 August – Nairobi
Egypt (a.e.t.)	1
Kenya	0
Third place
12 August – Nairobi
Cameroon	1
Malawi	3

==== Semifinals ====
9 August 1987

Cameroon	1–1 (a.e.t.)	Egypt
Kana-Biyik 119'		Ramadan 113'
Penalties
Sinkot (penalty missed); Arsena (penalty scored); Tataw (penalty scored); Djonkep (penalty scored); Songo'o (penalty missed)	3–4	(penalty scored) Abdelghani; (penalty scored) Shehata; (penalty scored) H. Hassan; (penalty missed) Ali; (penalty scored) Younes

Nyayo National Stadium, Nairobi
Referee: Rachid Madjiba (Algeria)

10 August 1987

Malawi	1–1 (a.e.t.)	Kenya
Ayoyi 44'		Phiri 88'
Penalties
	3–4

Nyayo National Stadium, Nairobi
Referee: Idrissa Traoré (Mali)

==== Third place match ====
12 August 1987

Cameroon	1–3	Malawi
Ollé Ollé 26'		Waya 25', 70'; Malunga 56'

Kasarani Stadium, Nairobi
Attendance: 80,000
Referee: Ali Ben Nasser (Tunisia)

==== Final ====
12 August 1987

Egypt	1–0 (a.e.t.)	Kenya
Ramadan 101'

Kasarani Stadium, Nairobi
Attendance: 80,000
Referee: Tesfaye Gebreyesus (Ethiopia)

== Final ranking ==
Rank	Team	Pld	W	D	L	GF	GA	GD	Pts
1	Egypt	5	3	1	1	6	4	+2	7
2	Kenya (H)	5	2	2	1	7	6	+1	6
3	Malawi	5	3	1	1	8	4	+4	7
4	Cameroon	5	2	2	1	11	8	+3	6
Eliminated in the group stage
5	Ivory Coast	4	2	1	1	4	3	+1	5
6	Madagascar	4	1	1	2	5	6	−1	3
7	Senegal	4	1	0	3	1	4	−3	2
8	Tunisia	4	0	0	4	1	8	−7	0
