= 1981 CECAFA Cup =

Tournament details
- Host country: Tanzania
- Dates: November 14–28
- Teams: 8 (from CECAFA confederations)

Final positions
- Champions: Kenya (2nd title)
- Runners-up: Tanzania

Tournament statistics
- Matches played: 16
- Goals scored: 39 (2.44 per match)

The 1981 CECAFA Cup was the 9th edition of the tournament. It was held in Tanzania, and was won by Kenya. The matches were played between November 14–28.

Somalia withdrew before the tournament.

== Group A ==
Team	Pts	Pld	W	D	L	GF	GA	GD
Tanzania	5	3	2	1	0	6	3	+3
Kenya	4	3	2	0	1	3	2	+1
Malawi	3	3	1	1	1	6	4	+2
Zanzibar	0	3	0	0	3	3	9	–6

November 14, 1981

Kenya	1–0	Malawi
Kheri

November 15, 1981

Tanzania	3–1	Zanzibar

November 17, 1981

Kenya	2–1	Zanzibar
Mulamba; Kheri

November 17, 1981

Tanzania	2–2	Malawi
		Gondwe ?

November 20, 1981

Malawi	4–1	Zanzibar
Sinalo; Gondwe		Goal

November 20, 1981

Tanzania	1–0	Kenya

== Group B ==
Team	Pts	Pld	W	D	L	GF	GA	GD
Uganda	4	3	1	2	0	5	3	+2
Zambia	3	3	1	1	1	4	4	0
Zimbabwe	3	3	0	3	0	1	1	0
Sudan	2	3	0	2	1	2	4	–2

November 15, 1981

Uganda	2–2	Sudan
		Sami; Salah

November 17, 1981

Uganda	3–1	Zambia

November 17, 1981

Zimbabwe	0–0	Sudan

November 19, 1981

Zambia	1–1	Zimbabwe

November 20, 1981

Uganda	0–0	Zimbabwe

November 21, 1981

Zambia	2–0	Sudan

== Semi-finals ==
November 24, 1981

Tanzania	2–1	Zambia

November 24, 1981

Kenya	3–1	Uganda

== Third place match ==
November 27, 1981

Zambia	1–0	Uganda

== Final ==
November 28, 1981

Kenya	1–0	Tanzania
Omah 22'

Attendance: 40,000
