= Reinhard Fabisch =

German football manager (1950–2008)

Personal information
- Date of birth: 19 August 1950
- Place of birth: Schwerte, West Germany
- Date of death: 12 July 2008 (aged 57)
- Place of death: Münster, Germany
- Position: Striker

Senior career*
Years	Team	Apps	(Gls)
1969–1971	Borussia Dortmund	0	(0)

Managerial career
- 1987: Kenya
- 1992–1994: Zimbabwe
- 1996: Mamelodi Sundowns
- 1997: Kenya
- 2001–2002: Kenya
- 2005–2006: Emirates Club
- 2006–2007: Fujairah
- 2007–2008: Benin
- * Club domestic league appearances and goals

Reinhard Fabisch (19 August 1950 – 12 July 2008) was a German football manager and player. He coached teams in Qatar, Malta, Tunisia, Nepal, Oman, United Arab Emirates, and Zimbabwe and the national teams of Zimbabwe, Kenya, and Benin.

== Playing career ==
As a player Fabisch was signed to Borussia Dortmund between 1969 and 1971 although he did not play for the senior team.

== Coaching career ==
Fabisch commenced coaching in as an assistant with Tennis Borussia Berlin and SG Union Solingen.

Fabisch had three stints as coach of the Kenya national team. In 1987, he managed Harambee Stars to the runners up position against Egypt at the Fourth All-Africa Games, in 1997 he took charge during the qualification tournament for the 1998 World Cup. He was signed to replace Christian Chukwu in 2001, and during the CECAFA Cup he led Kenya to the finals, eventually losing to Ethiopia. He was dismissed in June 2002.

He previously managed the national team of Zimbabwe, as well as Emirates Club, and Fujairah, both in the UAE.

He became manager of the Benin national team in December 2007. He was embroiled in a controversy over match-fixing, after claiming he was asked for fix a result. He left the position in May 2008.

== Death ==
Reinhard Fabisch died of cancer in Germany on 12 July 2008. He had a son called Jonah with his Zimbabwean wife; the family lived in Germany.
