= Daniel Sakari =

Kenyan footballer (born 1999)

Personal information
- Full name: Daniel Sakari Macheso
- Date of birth: 25 January 1999 (age 27)
- Place of birth: Mathare North, Nairobi County, Kenya
- Height: 1.74 m (5 ft 9 in)
- Position: Right-back

Team information
- Current team: Tusker
- Number: 24

Senior career*
| Years | Team | Apps | (Gls) |
| 2017 | MMUST | | |
| 2018 | Green Commandoes | | |
| 2018–2019 | Kakamega Homeboyz | 26 | (0) |
| 2019–2021 | Kariobangi Sharks | | |
| 2021– | Tusker | | |

International career^{‡}
| 2019– | Kenya | 8 | (0) |
- * Club domestic league appearances and goals as of 21:12, 2 May 2021 (UTC) ‡ National team caps and goals as of 21:12, 2 May 2021 (UTC)

Daniel Sakari Macheso (born 25 January 1999) is a Kenyan professional footballer who plays as a right-back for Kenyan Premier League club Gor Mahia FC and the Kenya national team.

== Early life and education ==
Sakari was born in Mathare North in Nairobi County but grew up in Webuye, Bungoma County. Sakari was educated at Milo Central Academy and Maseno School before studying at Masinde Muliro University of Science and Technology. He graduated from the university with an undergraduate degree in statistics and pure mathematics.

== Club career ==
Despite playing rugby while attending Maseno School, Sakari joined his university team (MMUST FC) in 2017, before switching to Green Commandoes in 2018. He switched to Kakamega Homeboyz towards the end of 2018, before signing with Kariobangi Sharks in 2019.

In 2021, Sakari joined Tusker FC. He scored his maiden Tusker FC goal against Bumbani Stars in a 2-1 FKF Cup victory. He left for Kenya Police FC in 2024, ahead of the 2024-2025 season.

In 2026, Sakari joined Kenyan Premier League champions Gor Mahia on a two-year deal.

== International career ==
Sakari was first called up to the Kenya national football team in November 2019. He got his debut in March 2021 against Tanzania under head coach Jacob Mulee before standing out weeks later in a 1-1 draw between Kenya and Egypt, thrusting him firmly on the national stage.

In the 2024 CHAN (played in 2025), Sakari was the Kenyan team's assistant captain.
