= Football at the 1964 Summer Olympics – Men's African Qualifiers =

1964 Summer Olympics – Men's Football African Qualifiers
Tournament details
- Dates: 9 October 1963 – 21 June 1964
- Teams: 12 (from 1 confederation)

Tournament statistics
- Matches played: 18
- Goals scored: 71 (3.94 per match)

The Men's African Qualifiers saw three teams qualify for the 1964 Summer Olympics football tournament.

== Group 1 ==
| Team 1 | Agg. | Team 2 | 1st leg | 2nd leg |
|---|---|---|---|---|
First round
| Uganda | 2–7 | United Arab Republic | 1–4 | 1–3 |
| Sudan | w/o | Rhodesia | — | — |
Second round
| United Arab Republic | 7–4 | Sudan | 4–1 | 3–3 |

== Group 2 ==
| Team 1 | Agg. | Team 2 | 1st leg | 2nd leg |
|---|---|---|---|---|
First round
| Dahomey | 3–3 | Tunisia | 2–2 | 1–1 |
| Liberia | 4–6 | Ghana | 4–5 | 0–1 |
First round play-off
| Dahomey | 1–1 (a.e.t.) (t) | Tunisia | | |
Second round
| Ghana | 3–2 | Tunisia | 2–0 | 1–2 |

== Group 3 ==
| Team 1 | Agg. | Team 2 | 1st leg | 2nd leg |
|---|---|---|---|---|
First round
| Kenya | 5–10 | Ethiopia | 4–3 | 1–7 |
| Nigeria | 4–4 | Morocco | 3–0 | 1–4 |
First round play-off
| Morocco | 2–1 | Nigeria | | |
Second round
| Ethiopia | 0–2 | Morocco | 0–1 | 0–1 |
