= 1999 CECAFA Cup =

Tournament details
- Host country: Rwanda
- Dates: July 24 – August 7
- Teams: 12 (from CECAFA confederations)

Final positions
- Champions: Rwanda B (1st title)
- Runners-up: Kenya

Tournament statistics
- Matches played: 20
- Goals scored: 34 (1.7 per match)

The 1999 CECAFA Cup was the 23rd edition of the tournament. It was held in Rwanda, and was won by Rwanda B team. The matches were played between July 24–August 7.

Rwanda sent two teams: Rwanda A and Rwanda B.

== Group stage ==
=== Group A ===
Team	Pts	Pld	W	D	L	GF	GA	GD
Rwanda (A)	4	2	1	1	0	4	1	+3
Tanzania	4	2	1	1	0	2	1	+1
Djibouti	0	2	0	0	2	2	6	–4

July 24, 1999

Rwanda A	4–1	Djibouti
Hitimana 16'; Sefu 25'; Ndikumana 36'; Hategekimana 84'		Said 40'

Amahoro Stadium, Kigali
July 26, 1999

Tanzania	2–1	Djibouti
Mukabwa 36', 44'		Mohamed 40'

Amahoro Stadium, Kigali
July 28, 1999

Rwanda A	0–0	Tanzania

Amahoro Stadium, Kigali

=== Group B ===
Team	Pts	Pld	W	D	L	GF	GA	GD
Burundi	4	2	1	1	0	3	0	+3
Uganda	4	2	1	1	0	2	0	+2
Somalia	0	2	0	0	2	0	5	–5

July 25, 1999

Burundi	0–0	Uganda

Amahoro Stadium, Kigali
July 27, 1999

Burundi	3–0	Somalia

Amahoro Stadium, Kigali
July 29, 1999

Somalia	0–2	Uganda

Amahoro Stadium, Kigali

=== Group C ===
Team	Pts	Pld	W	D	L	GF	GA	GD
Ethiopia	4	2	1	1	0	2	0	+2
Sudan	2	2	0	2	0	1	1	0
Zanzibar	1	2	0	1	1	1	3	–2

July 25, 1999

Ethiopia	2–0	Zanzibar
Regassa 1'; Tesfaye 55'

Amahoro Stadium, Kigali
July 27, 1999

Ethiopia	0–0	Sudan

Amahoro Stadium, Kigali
July 29, 1999

Sudan	1–1	Zanzibar
Yaser Rahama

Amahoro Stadium, Kigali

=== Group D ===
Team	Pts	Pld	W	D	L	GF	GA	GD
Kenya	6	2	2	0	0	2	0	+2
Rwanda B	1	2	0	1	1	1	2	–1
Eritrea	1	2	0	1	1	1	2	–1

Rwanda B finished second on coin toss.

July 26, 1999

Rwanda B	0–0	Eritrea

Amahoro Stadium, Kigali
July 28, 1999

Kenya	1–0	Eritrea
Sunguti 58'

Amahoro Stadium, Kigali
July 30, 1999

Kenya	1–0	Rwanda B
Omondi 16'

Amahoro Stadium, Kigali

== Knockout stage ==
=== Quarter-finals ===
July 31, 1999

Rwanda A	1–0	Uganda
Nsengiyumva

Amahoro Stadium, Kigali
July 31, 1999

Burundi	1–0	Tanzania
Ndayishimiye

Amahoro Stadium, Kigali
August 1, 1999

Ethiopia	0–1	Rwanda B
		Gatete

Amahoro Stadium, Kigali
August 1, 1999

Kenya	3–0	Sudan
Sirengo 30'; Kimuyu 32'; Ongao 47'

Amahoro Stadium, Kigali

=== Semi-final ===
August 3, 1999

Rwanda A	0–0	Kenya
Penalties
	1–4

Amahoro Stadium, Kigali
August 4, 1999

Rwanda B	2–1	Burundi
Gishweka 51', 89' (pen.)		Daoudi 56'

Amahoro Stadium, Kigali

=== Third place match ===
August 7, 1999

Rwanda A	0–0	Burundi
Penalties
	3–2

Amahoro Stadium, Kigali

=== Final ===
August 7, 1999

Rwanda B	3–1	Kenya
Mugaruka 11'; Nfhizirungu 43'; Ndizeye 80'		Kimuyu 34'

Amahoro Stadium, Kigali
