= Regassa =

Regassa or Regasa is an Oromo male given name. People with the name include:

- Dejenee Regassa (born 1989), Ethiopian long-distance runner competing for Bahrain
- Genzeb Shumi Regasa (born 1991), Ethiopian female middle-distance runner for Bahrain
- Mulualem Regassa (born 1984), Ethiopian footballer
- Tilahun Regassa (born 1990), Ethiopian marathon runner
