= Ben Stanley Omondi =

Kenyan footballer

Ben Stanley Omondi (born 24 Sep 2004) is a Kenyan professional footballer who plays as a forward for Kenyan Premier League side Gor Mahia and Kenya.

== Career ==
He formerly turned out for Kenyan second-tier side Migori Youth, Kenyan Premier League sides Muhoroni Youth, Ulinzi Stars and Kakamega Homeboyz before joining Gor Mahia.

He was part of the Kenyan squad that featured in the 2024 African Nations Championship held across East Africa in August 2025.
