= Mohamed Ramadan (footballer, born 1970) =

Egyptian footballer

Personal information
- Date of birth: 3 September 1963 (age 63)
- Place of birth: Giza, Egypt
- Height: 1.80 m (5 ft 11 in)
- Position: Forward

Youth career
- Tersana SC

Senior career*
Years	Team	Apps	(Gls)
1987–1990	Tersana SC		
1990–1996	Al-Ahly		
1996–1998	Al-Marrikh SC Port Said		

International career
1988–1994	Egypt	43	(9)
- * Club domestic league appearances and goals

Mohamed Ramadan (Arabic مُحَمَّد رَمَضَان; born 3 September 1963) is an Egyptian former football forward. He was the top scorer of Egyptian Premier League (1990–91) with 14 goals playing for Al-Ahly.

== International career ==
Ramadan was a member of the Egypt national team in the 1994 African Cup of Nations.

== Career statistics ==
=== International ===
Appearances and goals by national team and year
National team	Year	Apps	Goals
Egypt	1984	2	0
Egypt	1985	7	2
Egypt	1987	14	6
Egypt	1988	13	0
Egypt	1989	4	1
Egypt	1991	1	0
Egypt	1994	2	0
Total		43	9

Scores and results list Egypt's goal tally first, score column indicates score after each Ramadan goal.

List of international goals scored by Mohamed Ramadan
No.	Date	Venue	Opponent	Score	Result	Competition	Ref.
1	29 March 1985		Cameroon	2–0	2–0	Friendly	
2	31 March 1985		Cameroon	–	2–1	Friendly	
3	27 June 1987	Cairo International Stadium, Cairo, Egypt	Kenya	1–0	4–0	1988 Summer Olympics qualification	
4	27 June 1987	Cairo International Stadium, Cairo, Egypt	Kenya	3–0	4–0	1988 Summer Olympics qualification	
5	27 June 1987	Cairo International Stadium, Cairo, Egypt	Kenya	4–0	4–0	1988 Summer Olympics qualification	
6	6 August 1987	Nyayo National Stadium, Nairobi, Kenya	Malawi	1–1	1–2	1987 All-Africa Games	
7	9 August 1987	Nyayo National Stadium, Nairobi, Kenya	Cameroon	1–0	1–1	1987 All-Africa Games	
8	12 August 1987	Moi International Sports Centre, Nairobi, Kenya	Kenya	1–0	1–0	1987 All-Africa Games	
9	6 January 1989	Cairo International Stadium, Cairo, Egypt	Liberia	2–0	2–0	1990 FIFA World Cup qualification	

== Honours ==
- Egyptian Premier League top scorer: 1990–91 with 14 goals
