= Eric Omondi Ongao =

Kenyan footballer (born 1977)

Personal information
- Full name: Eric Omondi Ongao
- Date of birth: 17 September 1977 (age 49)
- Place of birth: Kisumu, Kenya
- Position: Midfielder

College career
| Years | Team | Apps | (Gls) |
| 2001 | Mid-Continent Cougars | | |
| 2002 | Park Pirates | | (8) |

Senior career*
| Years | Team | Apps | (Gls) |
| 1998–2001 | KCB | | |
| 2002 | Nashville Metros | 0 | (0) |
| 2003 | Pittsburgh Riverhounds | 14 | (0) |
| 2012–2016 | Galveston Pirate SC | | |

International career
| 1997–2001 | Kenya | 34 | (6) |
- * Club domestic league appearances and goals

Eric Omondi Ongao (born 17 September 1977) is a Kenyan retired international footballer. He is the brother of fellow Kenya international Musa Otieno.
