= Chrispine Erambo =

Kenyan professional footballer

Chrispine Erambo (born 10 December 2004) is a Kenyan footballer who turns out for Kenyan Premier League side Tusker FC and Kenya's national team, Harambee Stars as a defensive midfielder.

He was part of the Kenyan squad that featured in the 2024 African Nations Championship held across East Africa in August 2025. He earned a red card in Kenya's 1–0 win over Morocco in Kasarani on 10 August 2025.
