= Washington Muhanji =

Kenyan footballer (born 1961)

Personal information
- Date of birth: 21 July 1961 (age 65)
- Place of birth: Kakamega County, Kenya
- Position: Goalkeeper

Senior career*
Years	Team	Apps	(Gls)
–1980	MoW Kakamega		
1981–1987	Scarlets		
1987–1992	AFC Leopards		
1992–1993	Al-Nasr		
1993–1994	Al Ain		
1994	Bandari		

International career
1981–1992	Kenya	86	(0)

Managerial career
- 1999: Kenya U20
- 2010–2011: Somalia (goalkeeper coach)
- –2014: AFC Leopards (goalkeeper coach)
- 2014: AFC Leopards (caretaker)
- * Club domestic league appearances and goals

Washington Muhanji (born 21 July 1961) is a Kenyan former footballer who played as a goalkeeper. He is considered one of the best Kenyan goalkeepers of all time.

== Playing career ==
Muhanji began playing football in 1973 while at school in Nairobi, where he played as a left-back alongside future Kenyan international footballer John Lukoye, before later becoming a goalkeeper by 1979. He mainly played for both Scarlets and AFC Leopards in Kenya, as well as for Al-Nasr in Oman and Al Ain in the UAE, where he was considered the Most Valuable Player of the 1993–94 season.

Muhanji made a total of 86 appearances for the Kenya national team, being called up for the first time in 1981 by manager Marshall Mulwa. He also represented the national team at both the 1988 and 1990 African Cup of Nations. His most famous result for Kenya came in August 1989, where he kept a clean sheet against that year's African Footballer of the Year winner George Weah in a 1–0 against Liberia during 1990 FIFA World Cup qualification.

== Coaching career ==
In 1999, Muhanji managed the Kenya under-20 national team that won the CECAFA U-20 Championship. He later acquired a coaching certificate from FIFA in 2010, while in South Africa. Afterwards, he served as a goalkeeper coach for both the Somalia national team and AFC Leopards. In April 2014, following the sacking of James Nandwa, he was appointed as the caretaker manager of Leopards, before being replaced by Pieter de Jongh in June. By December 2014, both he and assistant manager Abdalla Juma were fired by the club.

By November 2021, he was part of the technical staff of Kenyan side Vihiga Bullets.

== Personal life ==
Muhanji's wife, Grace Akinyi, represented the Kenya women's national volleyball and national netball teams.
