= Football at the 1964 Summer Olympics – Men's African Qualifiers – Group 2 =

The 1964 Summer Olympics football qualification – Africa Group 2 was one of the three African groups in the Summer Olympics football qualification tournament to decide which teams would qualify for the 1964 Summer Olympics football finals tournament in Japan. Group 2 consisted of four teams: Dahomey, Ghana, Liberia, Tunisia. The teams played home-and-away knockout matches. Ghana qualified for the Summer Olympics football finals after defeating Tunisia 3–2 on aggregate in the second round.

== Summary ==
Team 1	Agg.	Team 2	1st leg	2nd leg
First round
Dahomey	3–3	Tunisia	2–2	1–1
Liberia	4–6	Ghana	4–5	0–1
First round play-off
Dahomey	1–1 (a.e.t.) (t)	Tunisia		
Second round
Ghana	3–2	Tunisia	2–0	1–2

== First round ==
17 November 1963

Dahomey	2–2	Tunisia
Coffi 60'; Coréa 63'	Report	Sassi 25', 35'

Stade de l'Amitié, Cotonou
Attendance: 15,000
8 March 1964

Tunisia	1–1	Dahomey
Jedidi 37'	Report	Rahimi 49'

Stade Géo-André, Tunis
Attendance: 20,000

Dahomey and Tunisia tied 3–3 on aggregate and advanced to a play-off.

18 January 1964

Liberia	4–5	Ghana
Brown (?); (?)	Report	Acquah (?); (?)

Antoinette Tubman Stadium, Monrovia
2 February 1964

Ghana	1–0	Liberia
(?)	Report

Accra Sports Stadium, Accra
Attendance: 15,000

Ghana won 6–4 on aggregate and advanced to the second round.

=== Play-off ===
18 April 1964

Dahomey	1–1 (a.e.t.)	Tunisia
Córea 57'	Report	Jedidi 70'

Stade d'Honneur, Casablanca
Attendance: 1,000

Tunisia won the play-off via a toss and advanced to the second round.

== Second round ==
31 May 1964

Ghana	2–0	Tunisia
Mfum 44'; Kofi 88'	Report

Accra Sports Stadium, Accra
Attendance: 20,000
21 June 1964

Tunisia	2–1	Ghana
Jedidi 12'; Ben Othman 87'	Report	Salisu 57'

Attendance: 20,000

Ghana won 3–2 on aggregate and qualified for the Summer Olympics.

== Goalscorers ==
There were 23 goals scored in 7 matches, for an average of 3.29 goals per match.

3 goals

- (Tunisia national football team) Mohamed Salah Jedidi

2 goals

- (Tunisia national football team) Alaya Sassi
- (Ghana national football team) Edward Acquah
- (Benin national football team) Iréné Coréa

1 goal

- (Benin national football team) Coffi
- (Benin national football team) Rahimi
- (Liberia national football team) John Brown
- (Ghana national football team) Wilberforce Mfum
- (Ghana national football team) Osei Kofi
- (Ghana national football team) Mohammadu Salisu
- (Tunisia national football team) Taoufik Ben Othman
