= Football at the 1964 Summer Olympics – Men's African Qualifiers – Group 1 =

The 1964 Summer Olympics football qualification – Africa Group 1 was one of the three African groups in the Summer Olympics football qualification tournament to decide which teams would qualify for the 1964 Summer Olympics football finals tournament in Japan. Group 1 consisted of four teams: Rhodesia, Sudan, Uganda and United Arab Republic. The teams played home-and-away knockout matches. United Arab Republic qualified for the Summer Olympics football finals after defeating Sudan 7–4 on aggregate in the second round.

== Summary ==
Team 1	Agg.	Team 2	1st leg	2nd leg
First round
Uganda	2–7	United Arab Republic	1–4	1–3
Sudan	w/o	Rhodesia	—	—
Second round
United Arab Republic	7–4	Sudan	4–1	3–3

== First round ==
9 October 1963

Uganda	1–4	United Arab Republic
Bunyenyezi (?)	Report	Shehta 22', 50', 52', 60'

Nakivubo Stadium, Kampala
15 January 1964

United Arab Republic	3–1	Uganda
Abdel Fattah 2', 40'; El-Shazly 29'	Report	(?)

Nasser Stadium, Cairo

United Arab Republic won 7–2 on aggregate and advanced to the second round.

Sudan	w/o	Rhodesia
	Report

Rhodesia	w/o	Sudan
	Report

Sudan won on walkover and advanced to the second round.

== Second round ==
27 March 1964

United Arab Republic	4–1	Sudan
Ismail 6'; El-Sayed 23', 66'; El-Shazly 69'	Report	(?)

Nasser Stadium, Cairo
17 April 1964

Sudan	3–3	United Arab Republic
Jaxa (?); Al-Kawarti (?); (?)	Report	Shahin 4'; El-Shazly 13'; Hassan 49'

Municipal Stadium, Khartoum

United Arab Republic won 7–4 on aggregate and qualified for the Summer Olympics.

== Goalscorers ==
There were 20 goals scored in 4 matches, for an average of 5 goals per match.

4 goals

- (Egypt national football team) Mohamed Seddik

3 goals

- (Egypt national football team) Hassan El-Shazly

2 goals

- (Egypt national football team) Badawi Abdel Fattah
- (Egypt national football team) Farouk El-Sayed

1 goal

- (Sudan national football team) Nasr Eddin Abbas
- (Sudan national football team) Ebrahim Yahia Al-Kawarti
- (Uganda national football team) John Bunyenyezi
- (Egypt national football team) Mahmoud Hassan
- (Egypt national football team) Taha Ismail
- (Egypt national football team) Mohamed Shahin
