= Mohammed Kheri =

Kenyan Football Manager

Mohammed Kheri (born 12 Dec 1953) is a former coach who was in charge of the Kenya National team on three occasions; 1988, 1999, and 2005.

Kheri also had clubs stints, briefly coaching Gor Mahia in 1989, and most recently acting as Sporting Director of coastal outfit Sparki Youth, and still keenly follows up on the Kenya national team.
