= Josephat Murila =

Kenyan Footballer

Josephat Controller Murila is a retired Kenyan footballer who was capped 63 times for Kenya between 1979 and 1985, scoring a single goal.

He played as defender across the clubs he played for including Hombe FC, Mulembe FC, Abeingo FC, and Leopards between 1968 and 1985, and for Kenya.
