= John Bunyenyezi =

Ugandan footballer

Personal information
- Position: Midfielder

Senior career*
Years	Team	Apps	(Gls)
- Ntare School

International career
1960s	Uganda		(14+)
- * Club domestic league appearances and goals

John Bunyenyezi was a Ugandan footballer who played as a midfielder.

== Career ==
In 1956, Bunyenyezi was a member of the Uganda Football Association team that toured England in 1956, notably playing most of their matches barefoot.

In 1962, Bunyenyezi represented the Uganda national team at the 1962 African Cup of Nations, where he scored the country's first ever goal at the tournament in the 16th minute of a 2–1 defeat to the United Arab Republic. He scored again during the Uganda Independence Anniversary Cup, in a 4–1 defeat to Egypt, which also served as the first leg of the first round of 1964 Summer Olympics qualifying, as well as seven goals across two Gossage Cups in 1962 and 1963, and five goals in the Kenya Independence Tournament.

== Personal life ==
Bunyenyezi had five siblings, with one being a lieutenant colonel in the Uganda People's Defence Force. He is deceased.
