= Simeon Mulama =

Kenyan footballer (born 1980)

Personal information
- Date of birth: 6 August 1980 (age 46)
- Place of birth: Nairobi, Kenya
- Height: 1.76 m (5 ft 9 1/2 in)
- Position: Midfielder

Senior career*
Years	Team	Apps	(Gls)
1997	Mathare United		
1998	AFC Leopards		
1999–2001	Mathare United		
2001–2002	Ismaily		
2002–2005	Park University		
2007	Skellefteå FF		
2009–2010	Mathare United		

International career
2000–2001	Kenya	14	(2)
- * Club domestic league appearances and goals

Simeon Mulama (born 6 August 1980) is a Kenyan retired footballer who played as a midfielder.

== Career ==
Born in Nairobi, Mulama began his early career in his native Kenya with Mathare United and AFC Leopards; he was captain at the former. He later played in Egypt for Ismaily, in the United States for Park University, and in Sweden for Skellefteå FF. He returned to Mathare United in 2009.

Mulama earned eleven caps for the Kenyan national side, and appeared in one FIFA World Cup qualifying match.

== Personal life ==
He is the twin brother of fellow player Titus Mulama.
