= Noah Babadi Kasule =

Ugandan footballer (born 1985)

Noah Kasule
Personal information
- Full name: Noah Babadi Kasule
- Date of birth: May 15, 1985 (age 41)
- Place of birth: Uganda
- Height: 1.70 m (5 ft 7 in)
- Position: Defensive midfielder

Senior career*
| Years | Team | Apps | (Gls) |
| 2001–2005 | Kampala City Council | | |
| 2006 | Uganda Revenue Authority SC | | |
| 2007–2010 | Banants | 79 | (1) |
| 2011–2013 | Gandzasar Kapan | 59 | (1) |
| 2013 | Ulisses | 12 | (0) |

International career^{‡}
| 2001–2008 | Uganda | 26 | (0) |
- * Club domestic league appearances and goals as of 30 August 2016 ‡ National team caps and goals as of 30 August 2016

Noah Babadi Kasule (born 15 May 1985) is a retired Ugandan footballer who currently serves as fitness trainer and goalkeeping coach for the Uganda U-20 national team, known as the Hippos.

== Career ==
Kasule began his football career with Kampala City Council, playing from 2001 to 2005 and in 2006, he joined Uganda Revenue Authority SC.

In 2007, Kasule moved to Armenia, spending four-year at Banants and in 2011, he joined Gandzasar Kapan. Upon returning to Uganda, he joined Saints FC (later taken over by UPDF FC), a club he remained with until leaving in the 2017/18 season.

After his playing career, Kasule transitioned into coaching. He became the fitness trainer and goalkeeping coach for the Uganda U-20 national team, known as the Hippos, ahead of the 2024 CECAFA U-20 Championship.

== Career statistics ==
=== International ===
Uganda national team
| Year | Apps | Goals |
|---|---|---|
| 2001 | 3 | 0 |
| 2002 | 0 | 0 |
| 2003 | 4 | 0 |
| 2004 | 3 | 0 |
| 2005 | 3 | 0 |
| 2006 | 7 | 0 |
| 2007 | 5 | 0 |
| 2008 | 1 | 0 |
| Total | 26 | 0 |

Statistics accurate as of match played 31 May 2008.

== Achievements and Honors ==
He won the Uganda Premier League with Uganda Revenue Authority SC (URA) in 2006 and 2007.

He earned 26 caps for the Uganda national football team (“The Cranes”) between 2001–2008.

He was awarded Most Experienced Player at the 2021 Moses Oloya Football Tournament (veterans tournament recognition).
