= Jacob Mulee =

Kenyan football manager (born 1968)

Personal information
- Date of birth: 1968 (age 57–58)
- Place of birth: Kenya

Managerial career
- Years: Team
- 1999–2009: Tusker
- 2003–2004: Kenya
- 2004–2005: APR
- 2005: Young Africans
- 2005: Kenya
- 2007–2008: Kenya
- 2010: Kenya
- 2020–2021: Kenya

Jacob Mulee (born 1968), nicknamed Ghost, is a Kenyan association football coach. He also works as a radio host for Radio Jambo.

== Career ==
Mulee coached Kenyan club side Tusker between 1999 and 2009, winning the Kenyan Premier League title three times. He later coached APR of Rwanda and Young Africans of Tanzania.

Mulee first took charge of Kenya between 2003 and 2004, including at the 2004 African Cup of Nations. Mulee returned for a brief second spell in 2005, which lasted just one day from 16 to 17 December. Mulee returned to Kenya for a third time in March 2007. Mulee's fourth stint in charge of Kenya began in September 2010. Mulee quit the role in December 2010 following a run of three defeats in the 2010 CECAFA Cup.

In October 2020, he returned to coach the Kenyan national team for a fifth time. He was sacked by the KFF in September 2021.
