= Elijah Lidonde =

Kenyan footballer (1927–1987)

Personal information
- Date of birth: November 1927
- Place of birth: Kakamega, Kenya
- Date of death: September 1987 (aged 59)
- Position: Forward

Senior career*
Years	Team	Apps	(Gls)
- Nakuru
–1952	Idakho Location		
- North Nyanza

International career
1949–1961	Kenya	26	(33)

Managerial career
- Abaluhya Léopards
- 1967: Kenya
- * Club domestic league appearances and goals

Elijah Lidonde (November 1927–September 1987) was a Kenyan footballer and manager. He was capped 26 times for the Kenya national football team between 1949 and 1961, scoring 33 goals.

== Career ==
Born in November 1927 in Kakamega, Kenya, Lidonde was raised in the village of Sikokho. Educated at the Kakamega School, he began working at the Nakuru County Council in 1948, also starting his football career in the city. He was first called up to the Kenya national football team for the first time the following year, representing the nation at the Gossage Cup. In 1953 he won the Gossage Cup for the first time, scoring a hattrick in the final as Kenya beat Uganda 6–2.

He served as a community development assistant at the Jeanes School and in 1952 moved to North Nyanza to work as the district's first sports supervisor. Before the move he had played for Idakho Location, and while in North Nyanza he represented the local football team, winning the Remington Cup on a number of occasions.

Following his retirement as a player, he served as chairman of the Nairobi Open Soccer League. Having helped to form the club in 1964, he was the first coach of Abaluhya Léopards, winning the title in 1966 and 1967 and helping the side to the semi-finals of the 1968 African Cup of Champions Clubs. In 1966 he studied football coaching at Loughborough University in England for six months, before returning to Kenya and being named manager of the national team, winning the 1967 East African Challenge Cup.

== Personal life and death ==
Lidonde also represented Kenya at shot put, throwing 39 ft 1 inch at an international athletics meeting in Ndola, Zambia.

His son, Wellington "Tony" Lidonde, was also a footballer. Another son, Armstrong, went on to be a pastor in the United States.

Lidonde died in September 1987, following a long-term illness.

== Career statistics ==
=== International ===
Appearances and goals by national team and year
National team	Year	Apps	Goals
Kenya	1950	3	2
Kenya	1951	2	2
Kenya	1952	2	5
Kenya	1953	2	4
Kenya	1954	3	3
Kenya	1955	2	4
Kenya	1956	2	2
Kenya	1957	2	3
Kenya	1958	3	2
Kenya	1959	1	0
Kenya	1960	3	6
Kenya	1961	1	0
Total		26	33

=== International goals ===
Scores and results list Kenya's goal tally first.

No	Date	Venue	Opponent	Score	Result	Competition
1.	11 October 1950	Nairobi, Kenya	Uganda	?–?	3–1	Gossage Cup
2.	11 October 1950	Nairobi, Kenya	Uganda	?–?	3–1	Gossage Cup
3.	25 September 1951	Dar-es-Salaam, Tanganyika	Uganda	?–?	2–1	Gossage Cup
4.	29 September 1951	Dar-es-Salaam, Tanganyika	Tanganyika	?–?	2–3	Gossage Cup
5.	24 September 1952	Kampala, Uganda	Zanzibar	?–?	7–1	Gossage Cup
6.	24 September 1952	Kampala, Uganda	Zanzibar	?–?	7–1	Gossage Cup
7.	24 September 1952	Kampala, Uganda	Zanzibar	?–?	7–1	Gossage Cup
8.	27 September 1952	Kampala, Uganda	Uganda	?–?	3–6	Gossage Cup
9.	27 September 1952	Kampala, Uganda	Uganda	?–?	3–6	Gossage Cup
10.	30 September 1953	Kampala, Uganda	Tanganyika	?–?	7–1	Gossage Cup
11.	30 September 1953	Kampala, Uganda	Tanganyika	?–?	7–1	Gossage Cup
12.	3 October 1953	Nairobi, Kenya	Uganda	?–?	6–2	Gossage Cup
13.	3 October 1953	Nairobi, Kenya	Uganda	?–?	6–2	Gossage Cup
14.	5 October 1954	Nairobi, Kenya	Zanzibar	?–0	5–0	Gossage Cup
15.	5 October 1954	Nairobi, Kenya	Zanzibar	?–0	5–0	Gossage Cup
16.	9 October 1954	Nairobi, Kenya	Uganda	?–?	2–2	Gossage Cup
17.	13 October 1955	Dar-es-Salaam, Tanganyika	Zanzibar	?–0	8–0	Gossage Cup
18.	13 October 1955	Dar-es-Salaam, Tanganyika	Zanzibar	?–0	8–0	Gossage Cup
19.	13 October 1955	Dar-es-Salaam, Tanganyika	Zanzibar	?–0	8–0	Gossage Cup
20.	13 October 1955	Dar-es-Salaam, Tanganyika	Zanzibar	?–0	8–0	Gossage Cup
21.	27 November 1956	Kampala, Uganda	Tanganyika	?–0	9–0	Gossage Cup
22.	27 November 1956	Kampala, Uganda	Tanganyika	?–0	9–0	Gossage Cup
23.	4 September 1957	Zanzibar City, Zanzibar	Zanzibar	?–?	5–1	Gossage Cup
24.	4 September 1957	Zanzibar City, Zanzibar	Zanzibar	?–?	5–1	Gossage Cup
25.	4 September 1957	Zanzibar City, Zanzibar	Zanzibar	?–?	5–1	Gossage Cup
26.	8 October 1958	Nairobi, Kenya	Zanzibar	?–0	4–0	Gossage Cup
27.	8 October 1958	Nairobi, Kenya	Zanzibar	?–0	4–0	Gossage Cup
28.	10 October 1960	Kampala, Uganda	Zanzibar	?–?	4–1	Gossage Cup
29.	10 October 1960	Kampala, Uganda	Zanzibar	?–?	4–1	Gossage Cup
30.	12 October 1960	Kampala, Uganda	Tanganyika	?–0	5–0	Gossage Cup
31.	12 October 1960	Kampala, Uganda	Tanganyika	?–0	5–0	Gossage Cup
32.	12 October 1960	Kampala, Uganda	Tanganyika	?–0	5–0	Gossage Cup
33.	15 October 1960	Kampala, Uganda	Uganda	?–?	1–1	Gossage Cup
