= James Siang'a =

Kenyan footballer and manager

Personal information
- Full name: James Aggrey Siang'a
- Date of birth: c. 1949
- Place of birth: Kenya
- Date of death: 9 September 2016 (aged 67)
- Place of death: Bungoma, Kenya
- Position: Goalkeeper

International career
Years	Team	Apps	(Gls)
1963–1975	Kenya	68	(0)

Managerial career
- 1999–2000: Kenya
- 2001–2003: Simba SC
- 2002: Tanzania
- 2003–2004: Express FC
- 2004–2005: Moro United
- 2007: Mtibwa Sugar
- 2009–2010: Gor Mahia

James Aggrey Siang'a (c. 1949 – 9 September 2016) was a Kenyan footballer. Also active as a football manager, he coached throughout Africa at both the club and national level, and coached Kenyan club side Gor Mahia.

== Career ==
=== Playing career ===
Siang'a played as a goalkeeper and played at international level for Kenya. He played for Kenya at the 1972 African Cup of Nations finals.

=== Coaching career ===
Siang'a managed Kenya between 1999 and 2000. Siang'a then moved to Tanzania, where he was manager of the Tanzanian national team in 2002. Siang'a also managed Tanzanian club sides Simba SC and Moro United, as well as Express FC in Uganda. In October 2004, while at Moro United, Siang'a was approached to take over as manager of the Kenyan national team, but he refused. Later that same month, Siang'a was also approached to become manager of the Tanzanian national team; once again, he refused. Siang'a also coached Mtibwa Sugar in Tanzania, before becoming coach of Gor Mahia in Kenya.

== Honours ==
- CECAFA Clubs Cup – Simba SC (2002)
