= Abdelouahab Maïche =

Algerian footballer (born 1959)

Personal information
- Date of birth: 30 November 1959
- Place of birth: Sétif, Algeria
- Date of death: 26 September 2020 (aged 60)
- Position: Defensive midfielder

Senior career*
Years	Team	Apps	(Gls)
1977–1987	NA Hussein Dey		
1987–1990	MC Alger		
1990–1993	Excelsior Virton		
1993–1994	Al Tarsana SC		

International career
1983–1989	Algeria	23	(0)
- * Club domestic league appearances and goals

Abdelouahab Maïche (30 November 1959 – 26 September 2020) was an Algerian footballer who played as a defensive midfielder. He made 23 appearances for the Algeria national team between 1983 and 1989. He was also named in Algeria's squad for the 1988 African Cup of Nations tournament. He died on 26 September 2020, at the age of 60.
