= Francis Onyiso =

Kenyan footballer (born 1972)

Personal information
- Full name: Francis Onyiso Okoth
- Date of birth: 16 November 1972 (age 53)

Senior career*
Years	Team	Apps	(Gls)
1995-2011	Ulinzi Stars		

International career
1996–2011	Kenya	51	(0)
- * Club domestic league appearances and goals

Francis Onyiso (born 16 November 1972) is a Kenyan footballer. He played in 51 matches for the Kenya national football team from 1996 to 2011. He was also named in Kenya's squad for the 2004 African Cup of Nations tournament.
