= Marshall Mulwa =

Former head coach of Kenya national football team

Marshall Mulwa is a former head coach of Kenya national football team from April 1980 to June 1985. Under his watch Kenya won the Cecafa Challenge Cup for three successive years from 1981 to 1983.
