= Jonah Fabisch =

Footballer (born 2001)

Personal information
- Full name: Jonah Reinhard Fabisch
- Date of birth: 13 August 2001 (age 25)
- Place of birth: Nairobi, Kenya
- Height: 1.78 m (5 ft 10 in)
- Position: Midfielder

Team information
- Current team: Lamontville Golden Arrows

Youth career
- 2012–2020: Hamburger SV

Senior career*
| Years | Team | Apps | (Gls) |
| 2020–2023 | Hamburger SV II | 63 | (14) |
| 2023–2024 | 1. FC Magdeburg II | 19 | (10) |
| 2024–2026 | Erzgebirge Aue | 52 | (3) |
| 2026– | Lamontville Golden Arrows | 0 | (0) |

International career^{‡}
| 2021– | Zimbabwe | 13 | (0) |
- * Club domestic league appearances and goals as of 8 May 2026 ‡ National team caps and goals as of 30 May 2026

Jonah Reinhard Fabisch (born 13 August 2001) is a professional footballer who plays as a midfielder for South African Premiership club Lamontville Golden Arrows. Born in Kenya, he plays for the Zimbabwe national team.

== Club career ==
Fabisch joined youth academy of Hamburger SV in 2012. He made his debut for club's reserve team on 6 September 2020 in a 1–1 draw against Lüneburger SK Hansa.

In June 2023, Fabisch joined 1. FC Magdeburg. On 26 June 2024, Erzgebirge Aue announced the signing of Fabisch on a two-year contract until June 2026. In August 2026, he joined South African club Lamontville Golden Arrows.

== International career ==
Fabisch was eligible to represent both Germany and Zimbabwe at the international level. He has played for under-17 and under-19 perspektivteams of DFB in 2018 and 2019.

In August 2021, Fabisch received his first call-up to the Zimbabwe national team. He made his international debut on 14 November 2021 in a 1–1 draw against Ethiopia. On 11 December 2025, Fabisch was called up to the Zimbabwe squad for the 2025 Africa Cup of Nations.

== Personal life ==
Fabisch was born in Kenya to a German father and a Zimbabwean Shona mother. His father Reinhard Fabisch was a football manager. His mother Chawada Kachidza is a former national 100 metres hurdles record holder.

== Career statistics ==
=== Club ===
As of match played 8 May 2026

Appearances and goals by club, season and competition
| Club | Season | League | | | National cup | | Other | | Total | |
| Club | Season | Division | Apps | Goals | Apps | Goals | Apps | Goals | Apps | Goals |
|---|---|---|---|---|---|---|---|---|---|---|
| Hamburger SV II | 2020–21 | Regionalliga Nord | 10 | 0 | — | | — | | 10 | 0 |
| Hamburger SV II | 2021–22 | Regionalliga Nord | 18 | 3 | — | | 9 (Note: Appearances in playoffs) | 1 | 27 | 4 |
| Hamburger SV II | 2022–23 | Regionalliga Nord | 35 | 11 | — | | — | | 35 | 11 |
| Hamburger SV II | Total | | 63 | 14 | 0 | 0 | 9 | 1 | 72 | 15 |
| 1. FC Magdeburg II | 2023–24 | NOFV-Oberliga Süd | 19 | 10 | — | | — | | 19 | 10 |
| Erzgebirge Aue | 2024–25 | 3. Liga | 22 | 0 | 0 | 0 | 5 (Note: Appearances in Saxony Cup) | 0 | 27 | 0 |
| Erzgebirge Aue | 2025–26 | 3. Liga | 30 | 3 | — | | 2 | 0 | 32 | 3 |
| Erzgebirge Aue | Total | | 52 | 3 | 0 | 0 | 7 | 0 | 59 | 3 |
| Career total | | | 134 | 27 | 0 | 0 | 16 | 1 | 150 | 28 |

=== International ===
As of match played 30 May 2026

Appearances and goals by national team and year
| National team | Year | Apps | Goals |
|---|---|---|---|
| Zimbabwe | 2021 | 1 | 0 |
| Zimbabwe | 2025 | 8 | 0 |
| Zimbabwe | 2026 | 4 | 0 |
| Total | | 13 | 0 |

== Honours ==
Erzgebirge Aue

- Saxony Cup: 2025–26
