= Allan Thigo =

Kenyan footballer (died 2026)

- Thigo with his Hall of Fame award in 2018

Personal information
- Date of birth: 1951 or 1952
- Place of birth: Bungoma, Protectorate of Kenya
- Date of death: 9 May 2026 (aged 74) (Note: Some sources like the Daily Nation state he was 77)
- Place of death: Bungoma County, Kenya
- Position: Midfielder

Senior career*
Years	Team	Apps	(Gls)
1967–?	Kisumu Hot Stars		
1970–1981	Gor Mahia		

International career
1968–1979	Kenya	81	(11)

Managerial career
- 2008: Gor Mahia
- * Club domestic league appearances and goals

Allan Thigo (1951 or 1952 – 9 May 2026), nicknamed the 90-minute man, was a Kenyan footballer who played as a midfielder. He made 81 appearances for the Kenya national team, scoring 11 goals.

== Career ==
Born in the Colony and Protectorate of Kenya, Thigo began playing club football for local side Kisumu Hot Stars at age 18. He spent most of his playing career with Gor Mahia, leading it to an unbeaten 1976 league title and later helping the club reach the final of the 1979 African Cup Winners' Cup. He played for Gor Mahia for 13 years; 1970 to 1982. Between 1970 and 1981, he scored 88 goals for the club, making him the club's second highest scorer.

Thigo made 81 appearances for the senior Kenya national team, including two FIFA World Cup qualifying matches, and he played at the 1972 African Cup of Nations finals.

After Thigo retired from playing football, he became a coach. He managed Gor Mahia and mentored players at the Africa Nazarene University.

== Personal life ==
Thigo was married to Rose Auma Ogango, who died in 2012 and later to Dorcas Simiyu. He was the father to the Special Envoy for Technology Philip Thigo.

== Death ==
Thigo died aged 74, at his Bungoma County home on 9 May 2026, he had long battled prostate cancer since his 2021 diagnosis. (Note: According to Citizen TV he battled cancer since 2023.) Sports Cabinet Secretary Salim Mvurya eulogised him as one of Kenya's greatest footballers. He was cremated on 13 May, following his wishes, at the Hindu crematorium in Kisumu.
