= Mourad Jabrane =

Moroccan footballer

Personal information
- Position: Defender

Senior career*
Years	Team	Apps	(Gls)
c. 1986–1994	MAS Fez		

International career
1987–1988	Morocco		
- * Club domestic league appearances and goals

Mourad Jabrane is a retired Moroccan football defender.
