= Alex Isabirye =

Ugandan football manager (born 1981)

Personal information
- Full name: Alex Isabirye Musongola
- Date of birth: 15 December 1981 (age 44)
- Place of birth: Kampala, Uganda
- Position: Striker

Team information
- Current team: URA

Youth career
- Jinja

Senior career*
Years	Team	Apps	(Gls)
1994-1999	Nile Breweries Jinja		
1999–2001	Express F.C.		
2001–2002	SCOUL Lugazi		
2002–2004	SC Villa		
2008	URA FC		

International career
2001	Uganda	14	

Managerial career
- 2010-2011: URA FC
- 2014-2015: URA FC
- 2015-2016: BUL FC
- 2017-2018: Soana FC
- 2019-2021: Kyetume FC
- 2021-2022: Bul FC
- 2022-2023: Vipers SC
- 2023-2024: Express FC
- 2024-upto date: URA
- * Club domestic league appearances and goals

Alex Isabirye Musongola (born 15 December 1981) is a Ugandan football manager who manages URA in the Uganda Premier League.

== Career ==
=== Player ===
As a player, Isabirye played for Nile Breweries Jinja, Express FC, Scoul Lugazi, SC Villa and URA.

=== Managerial career ===
Isabirye has managed various teams including URA FC, BUL FC, Soana FC, Nyamityobora FC, Vipers SC, Express FC and currently he manages URA since May 2024.

== Player honors ==
SC Villa

- Ugandan Premier League: 3

2002, 2003, 2004

- Ugandan Cup: 1

2002

== Managerial honors ==
Victoria University

- Ugandan Cup: 1

2014

URA

- Ugandan Premier League: 1

2011

- Ugandan Cup: 1

2012

Buganda Province

- FUFA Drum tournament : 1

2018

Horseed

- General Da’ud Cup : 1

2020

BUL

- Ugandan Cup: 1

2022

Vipers

- Ugandan Premier League: 1

2022–23

- Ugandan Cup: 1

2023
