= Chris Makokha =

Kenyan Football Manager

Chris Makokha is a former coach who was in charge of the Kenya National team in 1988 whom he led at the 1988 Africa Cup of Nations in group B matches against Cameroon, Nigeria and Egypt.

He is best remembered for coaching Kakamega High School's Green Commandoes, defunct Motcom FC and AFC Leopards.

He died in May 2013 at the Moi Teaching and Referral Hospital, Eldoret.
