= John Nyawanga =

Kenyan footballer

Personal information
- Place of birth: Kenya
- Position: Striker

Senior career*
| Years | Team | Apps | (Gls) |
| –1969 | Abaluhya United | | |
| 1970–1980 | Kenya Breweries | | |

International career
| 1965–1976 | Kenya | 80 | (17) |
- * Club domestic league appearances and goals

John Nyawanga is a Kenyan former international footballer who played as a striker.

Nyawanga earned 80 caps for Kenya, scoring 17 goals, and captained Kenya at the 1972 Africa Cup of Nations, their first appearance at the tournament. During his club career, he played for Abaluhya United and Kenya Breweries. He worked at a sports goods shop in Nairobi following his retirement.
