= Pascal Fallmann =

Austrian footballer

Personal information
- Date of birth: 7 November 2003 (age 23)
- Place of birth: Sankt Pölten, Austria
- Height: 1.87 m (6 ft 2 in)
- Position: Defender

Team information
- Current team: Viktoria Köln
- Number: 28

Youth career
- 2009–2012: SKN St. Pölten
- 2012–2020: Rapid Wien

Senior career*
Years	Team	Apps	(Gls)
2020–2024	Rapid Wien II	46	(2)
2022–2024	Rapid Wien	1	(0)
2023–2024	→ SC Freiburg II (loan)	34	(0)
2024–2026	Erzgebirge Aue	65	(2)
2026–	Viktoria Köln	0	(0)

International career^{‡}
2017–2018	Austria U15	8	(0)
2018–2019	Austria U16	12	(0)
2019	Austria U17	4	(0)
2022	Austria U19	6	(1)
2022–2024	Austria U21	11	(0)
- * Club domestic league appearances and goals as of 30 May 2026 ‡ National team caps and goals as of 22 March 2024

Pascal Fallmann (born 7 November 2003) is an Austrian footballer who plays as a right-back for German 3. Liga club Viktoria Köln.

== Club career ==
On 7 July 2023, Fallmann joined SC Freiburg II in German 3. Liga on loan.

On 28 May 2024, he moved to another 3. Liga club Erzgebirge Aue on a two-year contract.

== Career statistics ==
=== Club ===
As of 25 September 2020.

Appearances and goals by club, season and competition
Club	Season	League			Cup		Continental		Other		Total	
Club	Season	Division	Apps	Goals	Apps	Goals	Apps	Goals	Apps	Goals	Apps	Goals
Rapid Wien II	2020–21	2. Liga	2	0	–		–		0	0	2	0
Career total			2	0	0	0	0	0	0	0	2	0
