= Austin Oduor =

Kenyan footballer

Austin 'Makamu' Oduor was a former Kenyan footballer who turned out for Kenya between 1987 and 1990, and for club side Gor Mahia FC between 1980 and 1990.

He captained both club and the national team and is best remembered for his leadership and for lifting the 1987 Mandela Cup after Gor Mahia took down Espérance from Tunisia. He featured for Kenya in the 1988 Africa Cup of Nations.

He died on 16 October 2024.
