= Robert Mambo Mumba =

Kenyan footballer (born 1978)

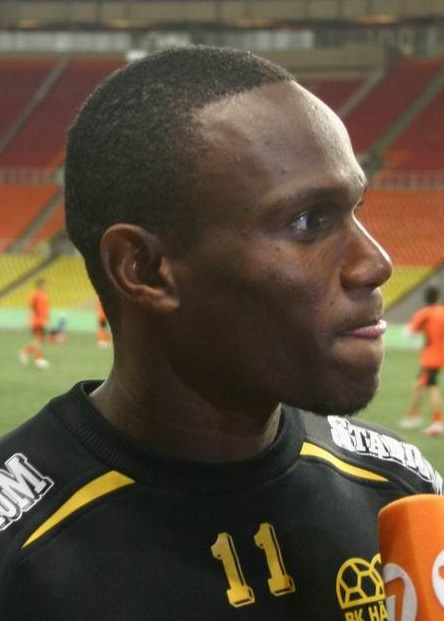

Personal information
- Full name: Robert Mambo George Randu Mumba
- Date of birth: 25 October 1978 (age 48)
- Place of birth: Mombasa, Kenya
- Height: 1.85 m (6 ft 1 in)
- Position: Midfielder

Youth career
- 1991–1995: Bandari
- 1996–1997: Nyoka

Senior career*
Years	Team	Apps	(Gls)
1998–2000	Kenya Pipeline	16	(4)
2000–2004	K.A.A. Gent	5	(0)
2001–2002	→ K.R.C. Gent-Zeehaven (loan)	22	(8)
2002–2003	→ Coast Stars (loan)	20	(9)
2004	Örebro SK	12	(1)
2005–2006	Viking FK	19	(5)
2006–2007	BK Häcken	42	(12)
2007–2010	GIF Sundsvall	40	(7)
2010	→ Umeå FC (loan)	14	(4)
2011–2012	Dalkurd FF	36	(19)

International career
1999	Kenya U-21	2	(0)
1999–2009	Kenya	72	(13)

Managerial career
- 2013: Dalkurd FF
- * Club domestic league appearances and goals

Robert Mambo George Randu Mumba (born 25 October 1978 in Mombasa) is a Kenyan former footballer. He is a former player of Swedish club GIF Sundsvall.

== Club career ==
His previous club (up until the spring of 2006) was Viking FK in Norway. His previous clubs include Örebro SK, BK Häcken and K.A.A. Gent, and he played for Coast Stars, Nyoka FC and Kenya Pipeline FC before moving to Europe. On 8 February 2011 he resigned his contract with GIF Sundsvall and joined Dalkurd FF.

== International career ==
Mambo has played 50 international matches and scored 15 goals for Kenya. He appeared at the 2004 African Nations Cup. Mambo became the skipper of the Kenyan national team after the retirement of Musa Otieno.
