= Tom Juma =

Kenyan footballer (born 1976)

Personal information
- Full name: Thomas Juma Oundo
- Date of birth: 23 September 1976 (age 50)
- Position: Midfielder

Senior career*
Years	Team	Apps	(Gls)
–1999	A.F.C. Leopards		
2000–2001	Oserian Fastac		
2002	Mjällby AIF	20	(0)
2003–2005	Friska Viljor	65	(5)
2006–2008	Husqvarna FF	70	(5)
2009	Sofapaka		
2010–2013	Friska Viljor	68	(10)

International career
1995–2005	Kenya	38	(2)

Managerial career
- 2012: Administration Police
- 2016: Muhoroni Youth (interim)
- 2016: Muhoroni Youth (interim)
- 2016: Muhoroni Youth
- 2017: A.F.C. Leopards (assistant)
- 2017: A.F.C. Leopards (caretaker)
- 2018–: A.F.C. Leopards (team manager)
- * Club domestic league appearances and goals

Tom Juma (born 23 September 1976) is a Kenyan professional footballer. He played in 38 matches for the Kenya national football team from 1995 to 2005. He was a part of the team that famously upset Algeria 3–1 during 1998 FIFA World Cup qualification, and was also named in Kenya's squad for the 2004 African Cup of Nations tournament.

At club level he was named player of the year in Kenya in 2001, prompting a move to Sweden.

== Coaching career ==
He began his head coaching career at second-tier Kenyan side Administration Police in 2012. After two stints as interim head coach at Muhoroni Youth early in the 2016 season, he was finally given the permanent job in October of that year. The following year he joined A.F.C. Leopards as an assistant, but finished the year as caretaker after manager Dorian Marin was sacked.
