= Danny Mansoni Ngombo =

Congolese footballer (born 1963)

Personal information
- Date of birth: 25 October 1963 (age 63)
- Position: Defender

Senior career*
| Years | Team | Apps | (Gls) |
| 1986–1990 | K. Beerschot V.A.V. | | |
| 1990–1992 | K.F.C. Germinal Ekeren | 19 | (0) |
| 1992–1995 | R.F.C. Seraing | | |
| 1995–1996 | Royale Union Liègeoise | 34 | (1) |
| 1996–1997 | Wuppertaler SV | 27 | (0) |
| 1997–1998 | R. Charleroi S.C. | 29 | (0) |
| 1998–1999 | R.C.S. Visétois | | |

International career
| 1988–1994 | Zaire | 17 | (0) |
- * Club domestic league appearances and goals

Danny Mansoni Ngombo (born 25 October 1963) is a retired Congolese football defender. He was a squad member at the 1988, 1992 and 1994 Africa Cup of Nations.
