= Tobias Ocholla =

Kenyan Footballer

Tobias Ocholla, nicknamed Juakali, is a retired Kenyan footballer who was capped 48 times for Kenya between 1987 and 1992.

== Career ==
Ochola, who turned out for club sides Kisumu Hot Stars and Gor Mahia between 1982 and 1996, featured at the 1988 Africa Cup of Nations, 1990 Africa Cup of Nations as well as 1992 Africa Cup of Nations.

He works at the Sports Department of Kenyatta University since the year 2002.
