= Daniel Nicodemus =

Kenyan Footballer (died 1981)

Daniel Nicodemus Arudhi is a retired Kenyan footballer who was capped 34 times for the Kenya between 1963 and 1972, scoring 17 goals. He turned out for club side Gor Mahia and represented Kenya at the 1972 African Cup of Nations in Morocco.

This footballer engaged in organized criminal activities He was shot dead on 21 June 1981.
