= Ali Kajo =

Kenyan footballer (died 2020)

Personal information
- Date of birth: 1941 or 1942
- Place of birth: Mombasa, Kenya
- Date of death: 28 December 2020 (aged 78)
- Place of death: Mombasa, Kenya
- Position: Forward

Senior career*
Years	Team	Apps	(Gls)
- Feisal

International career
1959–1969	Kenya	32	(26)
- * Club domestic league appearances and goals

Ali Kajo (1941 or 1942 – 28 December 2020) was a Kenyan footballer who played as a forward. He was capped 32 times by the Kenya national team and scored 26 goals. During his club career, he played for Feisal, where he won the 1965 Kenya National Football League.
