= Bertin Ollé Ollé =

Cameroonian footballer (1961–2024)

Personal information
- Date of birth: 30 November 1961
- Date of death: 13 January 2024 (aged 62)
- Place of death: Yaoundé, Cameroon
- Position: Midfielder

Senior career*
Years	Team	Apps	(Gls)
1979–1989	Tonnerre Yaoundé		
1990	Racing Bafoussam		

International career
1987–1988	Cameroon	10	(4)
Medal record
Men's football
Representing Cameroon
Africa Cup of Nations
Winner	1988 Morocco
- * Club domestic league appearances and goals

Bertin Ollé Ollé (30 November 1961 – 13 January 2024) was a Cameroonian footballer who played as a midfielder. He earned caps for Cameroon in 1987 and 1988 and played in the victorious 1988 Africa Cup of Nations Final. He was a member of the squad at the 1981 FIFA World Youth Championship. Ollé Ollé died on 13 January 2024, at the age of 62.

== Honours ==
Cameroon

- African Cup of Nations: 1988
