= Feisal F.C. =

Kenyan football club

Feisal FC
- Full name: Feisal Football Club
- Ground: Apostle Grounds

Feisal was an association football club based in Mombasa, Kenya. In 1965 the team has won the Kenyan Premier League and played its home games at the Apostle Grounds.
