= Joe Kadenge =

Kenyan footballer and coach (1935–2019)

Personal information
- Date of birth: 16 March 1935
- Place of birth: Soliani, Vihiga County, Kenya
- Date of death: 7 July 2019 (aged 84)
- Position: Winger

Senior career*
Years	Team	Apps	(Gls)
- Maragoli United F.C.
- A.F.C. Leopards

International career
1957–1970	Kenya	63	(25)

Managerial career
- 1975–1980: Maragoli United F.C.
- 2002: Kenya
- * Club domestic league appearances and goals

Joe Kadenge (16 March 1935 – 7 July 2019) was a Kenyan football player and coach born in Soliani village, Hamisi Sub-county in Vihiga. Farayi Mungazi, writing for the BBC, said that he is "regarded as the finest footballer ever produced by Kenya."

== Playing career ==
A winger, Kadenge played for Maragoli United, and scored the fastest ever goal in the Kenyan Premier League. He also played club football for Abaluhya United, winning the Kenyan Premier League in 1966.

In addition, Kadenge was part of the Kenya national football team.

== Coaching career ==
Kadenge managed the Kenya national football team in 2002. 1968 While playing for Abaluhya FC he coached Tiriki Football Club with Antony Mukabwa. In 1975 he left Abaluhya Football Club and rejoined Maragoli United FC as a player. He played briefly then retired. He was appointed the Team Manager of the club. When Maragoli United FC toured Netherlands in 1977 he acted as the coach. That time Maragoli was the first football club from Kenya to tour Europe. Under his management, In 1976, the club also played in Tanzania where they drew 0–0 against Young Africans Spots Club and lost 2–1 to Simba Sports Club. The same year they played Uganda Express whom they worn 2-1 and drew 0–0 with Simba Sports Club in Kampala. He was very good at poaching players and on record he was one of the best Team Managers.Some of the players he managed in Maragoli United FC are as follows; Mathews Keya, Jacob Machuki, Edward Kedogo Wilberfoce Mulamba, Edward Mwenesi, John Shihemi, Naftally Agufa, Mathews Ragama, Fred Ng'ang'a, Dunia Dilunga, Hamisi Ali, Francis Nzioka, Tony Lidonde, Polly Ouma, Abbey Nasur, Augustino Ichingwa, Rueben Osoro, Ben Anyona and Jeff Osunga.

== Personal life ==
Kadenge suffered a stroke in January 2006. He suffered a second stroke in February 2019 and died on 7 July 2019, aged 84.
