= Mulualem Regassa =

Ethiopian footballer (born 1984)

Personal information
- Date of birth: 4 June 1984 (age 42)
- Place of birth: Ethiopia
- Height: 1.80 m (5 ft 11 in)
- Position: Midfielder

Team information
- Current team: Saint-George SA
- Number: 14

Youth career
- –1999: Saint-George SA

Senior career*
Years	Team	Apps	(Gls)
1999–present	Saint-George SA		

International career
2000–	Ethiopia		
- * Club domestic league appearances and goals as of 31 August 2007

Mulualem Regassa (Amharic: ሙሉኣለም ረጋስሳ, born 4 June 1984) is an Ethiopian footballer. He currently plays for Saint-George SA.

Regassa is a midfielder and is part of the Ethiopia national football team. He began his career with Saint-George SA and was formerly the team captain.
