= Titus Mulama =

Kenyan footballer (born 1980)

Personal information
- Full name: Titus Brian Shimon Mulama
- Date of birth: 6 August 1980 (age 46)
- Place of birth: Mathare, Kenya
- Height: 1.76 m (5 ft 9 in)
- Position: Midfielder

Senior career*
Years	Team	Apps	(Gls)
1997–2005	Mathare United		
2005–2006	APR		
2006	Mathare United		
2006–2007	CS Herediano		
2007–2008	Västerås SK	37	(2)
2009–2010	Mathare United		
2010	KCB	4	(0)
2011–2012	Sofapaka	30	(0)
2012	St Eloi Lupopo		
2012	Nakuru AllStars		
2013	Sofapaka		
Total		75+	(2+)

International career
2001–2012	Kenya	71	(8)
- * Club domestic league appearances and goals

Titus Brian Shimon Mulama (born 6 August 1980) is a Kenyan former international footballer, who played as a midfielder.

== Career ==
Mulama played in Kenya for Mathare United, Nakuru AllStars and KCB, in the Democratic Republic of Congo for St Eloi Lupopo, in Rwanda for APR, in Costa Rica for CS Herediano, and in Sweden for Västerås SK. He finished his career at Sofapaka in FKF Division One.

== Career statistics ==
=== International ===
Appearances and goals by national team and year
National team	Year	Apps	Goals
Kenya	2001	5	2
Kenya	2002	11	1
Kenya	2003	20	3
Kenya	2004	10	1
Kenya	2005	6	0
Kenya	2006	1	0
Kenya	2007	3	0
Kenya	2008	3	0
Kenya	2009	1	0
Kenya	2010	–	
Kenya	2011	9	1
Kenya	2012	2	0
Total		71	8

Scores and results list Kenya's goal tally first, score column indicates score after each Mulama goal.

List of international goals scored by Titus Mulama
No.	Date	Venue	Opponent	Score	Result	Competition
1	12 December 2001	Amahoro Stadium, Kigali, Rwanda	Somalia	3–0	3–0	2001 CECAFA Cup
2	22 December 2001	Amahoro Stadium, Kigali, Rwanda	Ethiopia	1–2	1–2	2001 CECAFA Cup
3	18 May 2002	Sheikh Amri Abeid Memorial Stadium, Arusha, Tanzania	Tanzania	5–0	5–0	Friendly
4	23 March 2003	Moi International Sports Centre, Nairobi, Kenya	Tanzania	1–0	4–0	Friendly
5	23 March 2003	Moi International Sports Centre, Nairobi, Kenya	Tanzania	2–0	4–0	Friendly
6	2 December 2003	Stade Al-Merghani Kassala, Kassala, Sudan	Eritrea	3–2	3–2	2003 CECAFA Cup
7	26 January 2004	15 October Stadium, Bizerte, Tunisia	Mali	1–1	1–3	2004 Africa Cup of Nations
8	15 November 2011	Nyayo National Stadium, Nairobi, Kenya	Seychelles	3–0	4–0	2014 FIFA World Cup qualification

== Personal life ==
He is the twin brother of fellow player Simeon Mulama.
