= Musa Otieno =

Kenyan footballer (born 1973)

Personal information
- Full name: Musa Otieno Ongao
- Date of birth: 29 December 1973 (age 52)
- Place of birth: Nairobi, Kenya
- Height: 6 ft 4 in (1.93 m)
- Positions: Defender; defensive midfielder

Team information
- Current team: Kenya (assistant coach)

Youth career
- 1989–1990: Bedjos FC
- 1990–1992: Inter-Continental FC

Senior career*
Years	Team	Apps	(Gls)
1992–1994	AFC Leopards	37	(4)
1995–1997	Tusker FC		
1997–2011	Santos	311	(34)
2008	→ Cleveland City Stars (loan)	7	(1)

International career
1993–2009	Kenya	90	(9)

Managerial career
- 2020–: Kenya (assistant coach)
- * Club domestic league appearances and goals

Musa Otieno (born 29 December 1973 in Nairobi) is a Kenyan former footballer.

== Career ==
=== Club ===
Otieno has enjoyed a career on his native continent, playing for AFC Leopards and Tusker FC in Kenya, and from 1997 until 2011 for Santos in the South African Premier Soccer League. He helped them win the PSL title in 2001-02, the Bob Save Super Bowl in 2001, the BP Top 8in 2002, and the ABSA Cup in 2003.

Otieno first came to the United States in 2008, playing a season on loan with the Cleveland City Stars in the USL Second Division. He made his debut for the Stars on 4 July 2008, as a 64th-minute substitute for Mark Schulte, and went on to make seven appearances, scoring one goal, and helping them to the USL2 title.

On 15 December 2008, following the conclusion Santos' domestic season, Otieno returned to the Cleveland City Stars to play in their debut season in the USL First Division in 2009.

Otieno retired in 2011 having made over 300 appearances and scoring more than 30 goals for Santos.

He is the current Assistant technical manager for Morocco National Team.

=== International ===
Otieno is one of Kenya's most successful and decorated footballers, having made his national team debut for Kenya against Zaire in 1993 at the age of 19. He captained The Harambee Stars numerous times. He was also a member of the Kenyan 2004 African Nations Cup team, who finished in third place of their group in the first round of competition, thus failing to secure qualification for the quarter-finals.

He made 90 appearances for the Kenyan national team, scoring 9 goals.

Former Harambee Stars captain Musa Otieno assumes his new role as national football team assistant coach on Thursday. Otieno was on Monday named in the national team's technical bench in the preparations for the 2012 Africa Cup of Nations qualifier against Guinea Bissau.

== Personal ==
Otieno owns and operates a community outreach foundation in his home country, called the Musa Otieno Foundation.
