= Wilberforce Mulamba =

Kenyan Footballer

Wilberforce Mulamba is a retired Kenyan footballer who turned out for AFC Leopards, who was capped 68 times for the Kenya national football team between 1978 and 1988, scoring 14 goals. He represented Kenya at the 1988 African Cup of Nations in Morocco. Records indicate he scored 143 goals for Maragoli United and AFC Leopards between 1978 and 1991, and won six league titles in 1980, 1981, 1982, 1986, 1988 and 1989.

As a left winger, Mulamba, nicknamed 'Maradona', frequently appears in historical team selections for both Kenya and AFC Leopards.
