= Kenya national football team =

Kenya
- Nickname: Harambee Stars
- Association: Football Kenya Federation (FKF)
- Confederation: CAF (Africa)
- Sub-confederation: CECAFA (Central & East Africa)
- Head coach: Benni McCarthy
- Captain: Michael Olunga
- Most caps: Musa Otieno (90)
- Top scorer: William Ouma, Michael Olunga (35 each)
- Home stadium: Moi International Sports Centre
- FIFA code: KEN
First colours	Second colours	Third colours

FIFA ranking
- Current: 114 ▼5 (7 October 2026)
- Highest: 68 (December 2008)
- Lowest: 137 (July 2007)

First international
- Kenya 1–1 Uganda (Nairobi, Kenya; 1 May 1926)

Biggest win
- Kenya 10–0 Zanzibar (Nairobi, Kenya; 4 October 1961)

Biggest defeat
- Uganda 13–1 Kenya (Uganda; 14 December 1932)

Africa Cup of Nations
- Appearances: 7 (first in 1972)
- Best result: Group stage (1972, 1988, 1990, 1992, 2004, 2019, 2027)

African Nations Championship
- Appearances: 1 (first in 2024)
- Best result: Quarter-finals (2024)

COSAFA Cup
- Appearances: 2 (first in 2013)
- Best result: Group stage (2013, 2024)

CECAFA Cup
- Appearances: 37 (first in 1973)
- Best result: Champions (1975, 1981, 1982, 1983, 2002, 2013, 2017)

The Kenya national football team (Swahili: Timu ya Taifa ya Kandanda ya Kenya), colloquially known as the Harambee Stars, represents Kenya in association football. It is controlled by the Football Kenya Federation, the governing body of football in Kenya, and competes as a member of the Confederation of African Football (CAF) and the Council for East and Central Africa Football Associations (CECAFA). The team plays its home games primarily at the Nyayo National Stadium in the capital, Nairobi.

== Name ==
The team's colloquial name, the Harambee Stars, derives from Harambee, a Kenyan tradition of community self-help events such as fundraising and development activities. The word means "all pull together" in Swahili, and is the official motto of Kenya, appearing on its coat of arms.

== History ==
FIFA suspended Kenya from all football activities for three months in 2004, due to the interference of the government in football activities. The ban was reversed after the country agreed to create new statutes.

On 25 October 2006, Kenya was again suspended from international football, for failing to fulfil a January 2006 agreement made to resolve recurrent problems in its federation. FIFA announced that the suspension would be in force until the federation complied with the agreements previously reached.

Kenya qualified for the 2019 AFCON. The head coach at the time, Sébastien Migné, was appointed in May 2018, and since his appointment Kenya has climbed back into the top 100 FIFA ranked nations. He left in August 2019.

In May 2017, the Football Kenya Federation signed a 3-year partnership with kits manufacturer Mafro Sports to provide the kits for all national teams, as well as junior categories. The national team would use red jerseys for home matches, white jerseys for away matches, and green jerseys for matches played on neutral venues.

On 8 September 2018, Kenya earned a win over 4-time African champions Ghana, winning 1–0.

On 14 January 2023, Football Kenya Federation stated that it had suspended 14 players, including six players from Zoo Kericho FC and two coaches for match-fixing allegations.

== Results and fixtures ==
The following is a list of match results in the last 12 months, as well as any future matches that have been scheduled.

Win Draw Loss Fixture

=== 2025 ===
14 November Friendly	Kenya	0–1	Equatorial Guinea	Antalya, Turkey
18:00 UTC+3		Report		Stadium: Arslan Zeki Demirci Sports Complex; Referee: Kadir Saglam (Turkey)

18 November Friendly	Senegal	8–0	Kenya	Antalya, Türkiye
18:00 UTC+3	Jackson 9', 15'; Diouf 12'; Mané 17', 31' (pen.), 35'; Mbaye 48'; Ndiaye 80' (pen.)	Report		Stadium: Antalya Stadium; Referee: Atilla Karaoglan (Türkiye)

=== 2026 ===
27 March 2026 FIFA Series	Kenya	1–1 (4–5 p)	Estonia	Kigali, Rwanda
18:00 UTC+2	Ogam 51'	Report	Tammik 21'	Stadium: Amahoro Stadium; Referee: Georges Gatogato (Burundi)
	Penalties
	A. Odhiambo (penalty scored); Bajaber (penalty missed); Ouma (penalty scored); Erambo (penalty scored); Omondi (penalty scored); Odada (penalty missed)		(penalty scored) Tõugjas; (penalty missed) Yakovlev; (penalty scored) Schjønning-Larsen; (penalty scored) Tamm; (penalty scored) Sappinen; (penalty scored) Soomets

30 March 2026 FIFA Series	Grenada	0–3	Kenya	Kigali, Rwanda
16:00 UTC+2		Report	A. Odhiambo 13'; Ogam 18'; Valcin 81' (o.g.)	Stadium: Amahoro Stadium; Attendance: 31,200; Referee: Ahmed Arajiga (Tanzania)
Note: The third-place match and the final of the Rwanda A section of the 2026 FIFA Series, originally scheduled for 18:00 and 21:00 local time, respectively, were brought forward to 16:00 and 19:30 local time at the request of the participating teams.

4 June Friendly	Lesotho	1–1	Kenya	Pretoria, South Africa
15:00 UTC+2	Makhele 70'	Report	F. Odhiambo 12'	Stadium: Lucas Moripe Stadium; Referee: Jelly Chavani (South Africa)

7 June Friendly	Lesotho	0–4	Kenya	Pretoria, South Africa
15:00 UTC+2		Report	Bajaber 8', 52'; Ouma 84', 88'	Stadium: Lucas Moripe Stadium; Referee: Jelly Chavani (South Africa)

26 September 2027 AFCON qualification	Kenya	1–1	Eritrea	Nairobi, Kenya
16:00 UTC+3	R. Onyango (yellow card) 29' M. Onkwaro (yellow card) 60' R. Ogam 87'	Report	N. G. Netabay 36' V. Fors (yellow card) 52'	Stadium: Nyayo National Stadium; Attendance: 46,520; Referee: Mohamed Athoumani

1 October 2027 AFCON qualification	Guinea	1–0	Kenya	Conakry, Guinea
16:00 UTC+0	Guirassy 32'			Stadium: 28 September Stadium; Referee: Mohamed Maarouf (Egypt)

13 November 2027 AFCON qualification	South Africa	2-2	Kenya	Johannesburg, South Africa
18:00 SAST	Wanjala 9' (o.g.); Mofokeng 77'	Report	Olunga 44' (pen.); Ogam 90'	Stadium: Orlando Stadium; Referee: Patrice Mebiame (Gabon)

15 November 2027 AFCON qualification	Kenya	v	South Africa	TBD, Kenya
TBD				Stadium: TBD

=== 2027 ===
24 March 2027 AFCON qualification	Eritrea	v	Kenya	TBD, Eritrea
TBD				Stadium: TBD

28 March 2027 AFCON qualification	Kenya	v	Guinea	TBD, Kenya
TBD				Stadium: TBD

== Coaches ==
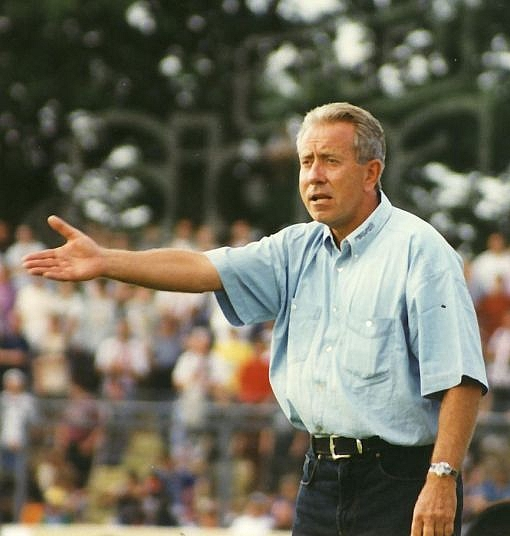
Eckhard Krautzun became the manager of the national football team of Kenya in 1971

Ray Batchelor was appointed the first national team coach in 1961. However, there was dissent regarding his managerial skills, and a revolt among players during a CECAFA Cup game in Zanzibar led to him being forced out. In 1963, not long after Kenyan independence was declared, Kenyan international Peter Oronge took over coaching duties; however, he disappeared just hours before a Jamhuri Day friendly against reigning champions Ghana in 1965. His absence was never explained, and Batchelor was called in as an emergency replacement. This match was the team's worst defeat, with a final score of 13–2 against Ghana. At the time, the Ghanaians were a very strong team with a dangerous striker in the form of Ben Acheampong. Two days later, after Batchelor had reorganised the team, the Kenyans and Ghanaians drew in a friendly match.

Caretaker managers in italics.
Managers since 1961 include:

- (England) Ray Batchelor (1961)
- (Kenya) Peter Oronge (1963)
- (England) Ray Batchelor (1965)
- (England) Jack Gibbons (1966)
- (Kenya) Elijah Lidonde (1967)
- (West Germany) Eckhard Krautzun (1971)
- (Kenya) Jonathan Niva (1972)
- (England) Ray Wood (1975)
- (Poland) Grzegorz Polakow (1979)
- (Kenya) Stephen Yongo (1979)
- (Kenya) Marshall Mulwa (1980–1983)
- (West Germany) Bernhard Zgoll (1984)
- (Germany) Reinhard Fabisch (1987)
- (Kenya) Chris Makokha (1988)
- (Morocco) Mohammed Kheri (1988–1990)
- (Austria) Gerry Saurer (1992)
- (Morocco) Mohammed Kheri (1995)
- (Federal Republic of Yugoslavia) Vojo Gardašević (1996)
- (Germany) Reinhard Fabisch (1997)
- (Kenya) Abdul Majid (1998)
- (Nigeria) Christian Chukwu (1998)
- (Kenya) James Siang'a (1999–2000)
- (Germany) Reinhard Fabisch (2001–2002)
- (Kenya) Joe Kadenge (2002)
- (Kenya) Jacob Mulee (2003–2004)
- (Kenya) Twahir Muhiddin (2004–2005)
- (Morocco) Mohammed Kheri (2005)
- (France) Bernard Lama (2006)
- (Kenya) Tom Olaba (2006)
- (Kenya) Jacob Mulee (2007–2008)
- (Kenya) Francis Kimanzi (2008–2009)
- (Germany) Antoine Hey (2009)
- (Kenya) Twahir Muhiddin (2009–2010)
- (Kenya) Jacob Mulee (2010)
- (Kenya) Zedekiah Otieno (2010–2011)
- (Kenya) Francis Kimanzi (2011–2012)
- (France) Henri Michel (2012)
- (Kenya) James Nandwa (2012–2013)
- (Algeria) Adel Amrouche (2013–2014)
- (Scotland) Bobby Williamson (2014–2016)
- (Kenya) Stanley Okumbi (2016–2017)
- (Belgium) Paul Put (2017–2018)
- (Kenya) Stanley Okumbi (2018)
- (France) Sébastien Migné (2018–2019)
- (Kenya) Francis Kimanzi (2019–2020)
- (Kenya) Jacob Mulee (2020–2021)
- (Kenya) Kennedy Odhiambo (2021)
- (Turkey) Engin Fırat (2021–2024)
- (Kenya) Francis Kimanzi (2024–2025)
- (South Africa) Benni McCarthy (2025–present)

== Players ==
=== Current squad ===
The following players were selected for the 2027 Africa Cup of Nations qualification matches against Eritrea and Guinea on 26 September and 1 October 2026; respectively.

Caps and goals are correct as of 7 June 2026, after the match against Lesotho.

No.	Pos.	Player	Date of birth (age)	Caps	Goals	Club
	GK	Bryne Odhiambo		17	0	(Football Kenya Federation) Gor Mahia
	GK	Brian Bwire	19 June 2000 (age 26)	8	0	(Football Kenya Federation) Tusker
	GK	Farouk Shikalo	12 October 1996 (age 30)	6	0	Free agent
	DF	Aboud Omar	9 September 1992 (age 34)	54	0	(Football Kenya Federation) Tusker
	DF	Rooney Onyango	8 August 2001 (age 25)	24	1	(Norwegian Football Federation) Sogndal
	DF	Mike Kibwage	1 October 1997 (age 29)	17	0	(Football Kenya Federation) Gor Mahia
	DF	Manzur Okwaro	23 March 2006 (age 20)	12	0	(French Football Federation) Stade Reims
	DF	Frank Odhiambo	29 October 2002 (age 24)	3	1	(Football Kenya Federation) Gor Mahia
	DF	Vincent Harper	22 September 2000 (age 26)	1	0	(The Football Association) Exeter City
	DF	Amos Wanjala	28 March 2006 (age 20)	0	0	(Royal Spanish Football Federation) Valencia
	DF	Haniff Wesonga	1 January 2003 (age 23)	0	0	(Sudan Football Association) Jamus
	MF	Duke Abuya	23 March 1994 (age 32)	27	2	(Tanzania Football Federation) Young Africans
	MF	Timothy Ouma	10 June 2004 (age 22)	12	0	(The Football Association) Charlton Athletic
	MF	Chrispine Erambo	12 October 2004 (age 22)	11	0	(Football Kenya Federation) Tusker
	MF	Marvin Omondi	3 December 2000 (age 25)	10	0	(Football Association of Zambia) Power Dynamos
	MF	Stanley Wilson	21 August 2006 (age 20)	2	0	(Swedish Football Association) AIK
	FW	Michael Olunga	26 March 1994 (age 32)	70	35	(Qatar Football Association) Al-Arabi
	FW	Ryan Ogam	21 December 2004 (age 21)	13	8	(Royal Belgian Football Association) Liège
	FW	Ben Stanley Omondi	24 April 2004 (age 22)	11	0	(Football Kenya Federation) Gor Mahia
	FW	Mohammed Bajaber	15 March 2003 (age 23)	6	3	Free agent
	FW	Job Ochieng	17 January 2003 (age 23)	5	0	(Royal Spanish Football Federation) Real Sociedad
	FW	Shariff Musa	9 October 2002 (age 24)	2	0	(Football Kenya Federation) Gor Mahia
	FW	Micah Obiero	22 February 2001 (age 25)	2	0	(The Football Association) Carlisle United
	FW	Javan Ochieng	2 March 2005 (age 21)	0	0	(United States Soccer Federation) Hickory

=== Recent call-ups ===
The following players have also been called up to the Kenya squad within the last twelve months.

Pos.	Player	Date of birth (age)	Caps	Goals	Club	Latest call-up
GK	Caleb Kramer	1 August 2006 (age 20)	2	0	(Netherlands) ADO Den Haag	v. Lesotho, 7 June 2026
GK	Ian Otieno	9 August 1993 (age 33)	13	0	(South Africa) Richards Bay	v. Grenada, 30 March 2026
DF	Erick Otieno	27 September 1996 (age 30)	52	0	(Poland) Raków Częstochowa	v. Lesotho, 7 June 2026
DF	Sylvester Owino	6 May 2001 (age 25)	16	0	(Kenya) Gor Mahia	v. Lesotho, 7 June 2026
DF	Alphonce Omija	9 October 2002 (age 24)	15	1	(Tunisia) ES Sahel	v. Lesotho, 7 June 2026
DF	Sydney Agina	31 August 2007 (age 19)	1	0	(England) Stoke City	v. Lesotho, 7 June 2026
DF	Deon Woodman	1 December 2002 (age 23)	1	0	(England) Wealdstone	v. Lesotho, 7 June 2026
DF	Daniel Sakari	25 January 1999 (age 27)	21	0	Kenya Police	v. Grenada, 30 March 2026
DF	Zak Vyner	14 May 1997 (age 29)	0	0	(Wales) Wrexham	v. Grenada, 30 March 2026
MF	Richard Odada	25 November 2000 (age 25)	28	1	(Romania) UTA Arad	v. Lesotho, 7 June 2026
MF	Austin Odhiambo	16 December 1999 (age 26)	17	3	(Lebanon) Nejmeh	v. Lesotho, 7 June 2026
MF	William Wilson	23 December 2001 (age 24)	14	1	(Finland) VPS	v. Lesotho, 7 June 2026
MF	Amos Nondi	10 February 1999 (age 27)	11	1	(Albania) Partizani	v. Lesotho, 7 June 2026
MF	Clarke Oduor	25 June 1999 (age 27)	4	0	(England) Grimsby Town	v. Lesotho, 7 June 2026
MF	Zech Obiero	18 January 2005 (age 21)	3	0	(England) Tranmere Rovers	v. Lesotho, 7 June 2026
MF	Kelly Madada	1 January 2006 (age 20)	1	0	(Kenya) AFC Leopards	v. Lesotho, 7 June 2026
MF	Alpha Onyango	23 December 2000 (age 25)	12	0	(Kenya) Gor Mahia	v. Grenada, 30 March 2026
MF	Chrispine Erambo	12 October 2004 (age 22)	10	0	(Kenya) Tusker	v. Grenada, 30 March 2026
FW	Lawrence Ouma	10 July 2005 (age 21)	5	2	(Finland) SJK	v. Lesotho, 7 June 2026
FW	Sammy Henia-Kamau	17 February 2006 (age 20)	1	0	(England) Hull City	v. Lesotho, 7 June 2026
^{INJ} Withdrew due to injury^{PRE} Preliminary/Standby squad^{RET} Retired from the national team^{SUS} Serving suspension^{WD} Withdrew from the squad due to non-injury issue

== Records ==
As of 18 November 2025
Players in bold are still active with Kenya.

=== Most appearances ===
Rank	Player	Caps	Goals	Career
1	Musa Otieno	90	9	1993–2009
2	Jonathan Niva	88	10	1965–1976
3	Allan Thigo	81	11	1969–1978
4	John Nyawanga	80	17	1965–1976
5	Dennis Oliech	76	34	2002–2015
6	Robert Mambo Mumba	72	13	2000–2009
7	Titus Mulama	71	8	2001–2012
8	Francis Onyiso	70	0	1996–2011
8	**Michael Olunga**	70	35	2015–present
10	Wilberforce Mulamba	68	14	1978–1988
10	James Siang'a	68	0	1963–1975

=== Top goalscorers ===
Rank	Player	Goals	Caps	Ratio	Career
1	William Ouma	35	66	0.53	1965–1977
1	**Michael Olunga**	35	70	0.5	2015–present
3	Dennis Oliech	34	76	0.45	2002–2015
4	Elijah Lidonde	33	26	1.27	1950–1961
5	Ali Kajo	26	32	0.81	1959–1969
5	Livingstone Madegwa	26	49	0.53	1964–1972
7	Joe Kadenge	25	63	0.4	1957–1970
8	John Baraza	21	52	0.4	2002–2011
9	Daniel Nicodemus	17	34	0.5	1963–1972
9	Mike Origi	17	48	0.35	1990–2004
9	John Nyawanga	17	80	0.21	1965–1976

== Competition records ==
=== FIFA World Cup ===
FIFA World Cup record									Qualification record					
Year	Round	Position	Pld	W	D	L	GF	GA	Pld	W	D	L	GF	GA
1930 to 1958	Part of United Kingdom								Part of United Kingdom					
1962 to 1970	Did not enter								Declined participation					
(West Germany) 1974	Did not qualify								6	2	2	2	9	8
(Argentina) 1978	Did not qualify								2	0	1	1	0	1
(Spain) 1982	Did not qualify								2	1	0	1	3	6
(Mexico) 1986	Did not qualify								4	1	1	2	6	10
(Italy) 1990	Did not qualify								6	1	3	2	2	4
(United States) 1994	Did not qualify								2	1	0	1	2	4
(France) 1998	Did not qualify								8	4	1	3	14	14
(South Korea) (Japan) 2002	Did not qualify								2	0	1	1	0	2
(Germany) 2006	Did not qualify								12	4	2	6	11	17
(South Africa) 2010	Did not qualify								12	4	1	7	13	16
(Brazil) 2014	Did not qualify								8	3	3	2	11	5
(Russia) 2018	Did not qualify								4	2	1	1	6	4
(Qatar) 2022	Did not qualify								6	1	3	2	4	9
(Canada) (Mexico) (United States) 2026	Did not qualify								10	3	3	4	18	14
(Morocco) (Portugal) (Spain) 2030	To be determined								To be determined					
(Saudi Arabia) 2034	To be determined								To be determined					
Total		0/16							84	27	22	35	99	114

=== African Nations Championship ===
African Nations Championship record
Year	Round	Position	Pld	W	D*	L	GF	GA
(Ivory Coast) 2009	Did not qualify							
(Sudan) 2011	Did not qualify							
(South Africa) 2014	Did not qualify							
(Rwanda) 2016	Did not qualify							
(Morocco) 2018	Did not qualify							
(Cameroon) 2020	Did not qualify							
(Algeria) 2022	Did not qualify							
(Kenya) (Tanzania) (Uganda) 2024	QF	5th	5	3	2	0	5	2
Total	QF	1/8	5	3	2	0	5	2

=== Africa Cup of Nations ===
Africa Cup of Nations record
Year	Round	Position	Pld	W	D*	L	GF	GA
(Sudan) 1957 to (United Arab Republic) 1959	Not affiliated to CAF							
(Ethiopia) 1962 to (Sudan) 1970	Did not qualify							
(Cameroon) 1972	Group stage	5th	3	0	2	1	3	4
(Egypt) 1974 to (Libya) 1982	Did not qualify							
(Ivory Coast) 1984	Did not enter							
(Egypt) 1986	Did not qualify							
(Morocco) 1988	Group stage	8th	3	0	1	2	0	6
(Algeria) 1990	Group stage	8th	3	0	1	2	0	3
(Senegal) 1992	Group stage	9th	2	0	0	2	1	5
(Tunisia) 1994	Did not qualify							
(South Africa) 1996	Withdrew							
(Burkina Faso) 1998 to (Mali) 2002	Did not qualify							
(Tunisia) 2004	Group stage	11th	3	1	0	2	4	6
(Egypt) 2006 to (Gabon) 2017	Did not qualify							
(Egypt) 2019	Group stage	17th	3	1	0	2	3	7
(Cameroon) 2021	Did not qualify							
(Ivory Coast) 2023	Disqualified due to FIFA suspension							
(Morocco) 2025	Did not qualify							
(Kenya) (Tanzania) (Uganda) 2027	Qualified as co-hosts							
2029	To be determined							
Total	Group stage	7/36	17	2	4	11	11	31

=== African Games ===
Year	Round	Pld	W	D	L	GF	GA
(Kenya) 1987	2nd	5	2	2	1	7	6

== Honours ==
=== Continental ===
- African Games^{1}
  - (silver) Silver medal (1): 1987

=== Regional ===
- CECAFA Cup
  - (gold) Champions (7): 1975, 1981, 1982, 1983, 2002, 2013, 2017
  - (silver) Runners-up (7): 1979, 1985, 1991, 1999, 2001, 2008, 2012
  - (bronze) Third place (6): 1978, 1988, 1989, 1994, 1995, 2003

=== Friendly ===
- Gossage Cup / Challenge Cup (14): 1926, 1931, 1941, 1942, 1944, 1946, 1953, 1958, 1959, 1960^{s}, 1961, 1966, 1967, 1971
- Four Nations Football Tournament (1): 2024

Notes

1. Competition organized by ANOCA, officially not recognized by FIFA.
