= 2021 CECAFA U-23 Challenge Cup =

International football competition

Tournament details
- Host country: Ethiopia
- Dates: 17–30 July 2021
- Teams: 9 (from 1 sub-confederation)
- Venue: 1 (in 1 host city)

Final positions
- Champions: Tanzania
- Runners-up: Burundi
- Third place: South Sudan
- Fourth place: Kenya

Tournament statistics
- Matches played: 13
- Goals scored: 24 (1.85 per match)
- Top scorer(s): (Eritrea) Ali Suleiman Ibrahim (3 goals)

The 2021 CECAFA U-23 Challenge Cup was 41st edition of the annual CECAFA Cup, an international football competition consisting of the national U-23 teams of member nations of the Council for East and Central Africa Football Associations (CECAFA).

This year's tournament was reserved for U23 players but teams were allowed to field up to three players over 23.

It took place in Ethiopia from 17 July to 30 July 2021.

Uganda were the defending having won title in 2019. The Democratic Republic of the Congo participated as an invited team.

== Participants ==
The FIFA World Ranking of participating Men's national football team as of 27 May 2021.

Country	Appearance	Previous best performance	FIFA ranking 27 May 2021
Burundi	23rd	Runner-Up (1990, 2013)	142
DR Congo	Debut (Invited)	None	94
Djibouti	13th	Group Stages	183
Eritrea	13th	Runner-Up (2019)	203
Ethiopia (Host)	34th	Champions (1987, 2001, 2004, 2005)	140
Kenya	37th	Champions (1995)	102
South Sudan	5th	Quarter-finals	169
Tanzania	62nd	Champions (1995, 2010)	137
Uganda	61st	Champions (1973, 1976, 1977, 1989, 1990, 1992, 1996, 2000, 2003, 2008, 2009, 2011, 2012, 2015)	84

== Venue ==
All matches are played at Bahir Dar International Stadium located in Bahir Dar, Ethiopia.

Bahir Dar	2021 CECAFA U-23 Challenge Cup is located in Ethiopia
Bahir Dar International Stadium	2021 CECAFA U-23 Challenge Cup is located in Ethiopia
Capacity: 60,000	2021 CECAFA U-23 Challenge Cup is located in Ethiopia

== Match officials ==
Referees

- Ramadhan Kayoko (Tanzania)
- Thierry Nkurunziza (Burundi)
- Dickens Mimisa Nyagrowa (Kenya)
- Ronald Madanda (Uganda)
- (Democratic Republic of the Congo) Yannick Malala Kabanga (DR Congo)
- Saddam Houssein Mansour (Djibouti)
- Teklu Mogos Tsegay (Eritrea)
- (South Sudan) Ring Malong (South Sudan)
- Haileyesus Bazezew Belete (Ethiopia)

Assistant Referees

- Kassim Mpanga (Tanzania)
- Thierry Kakunze (Burundi)
- Stephen Yiembe Eliezah (Kenya)
- Ronald Katenya (Uganda)
- Rachid Wais (Djibouti)
- Eyobel Michael Ghebru (Eritrea)
- (South Sudan) Gasim Madir Dehiya (South Sudan)
- Fasika Biru Yehualashet (Ethiopia)

== Draw ==
The draw ceremony of the tournament took place on 13 July 2021 15:00 local time in Addis Ababa. Nine teams were divided into 3 groups. The top finisher in each group and the best second-placed finisher will qualify for the Semi-finals.

== Groupings ==
Group A	Group B	Group C
Uganda; Tanzania; DR Congo	Burundi; Ethiopia; Eritrea	Kenya; South Sudan; Djibouti

== Group stage ==
Tiebreakers

Teams are ranked according to points (3 points for a win, 1 point for a draw, 0 points for a loss), and if tied on points, the following tiebreaking criteria are applied, in the order given, to determine the rankings (Regulations Article 9.3)

1. Points in head-to-head matches among tied teams;
2. Goal difference in head-to-head matches among tied teams;
3. Goals scored in head-to-head matches among tied teams;
4. If more than two teams are tied, and after applying all head-to-head criteria above, a subset of teams are still tied, all head-to-head criteria above are reapplied exclusively to this subset of teams;
5. Goal difference in all group matches;
6. Goals scored in all group matches;
7. Penalty shoot-out if only two teams are tied and they met in the last round of the group;
8. Disciplinary points (yellow card = 1 point, red card as a result of two yellow cards = 3 points, direct red card = 3 points, yellow card followed by direct red card = 4 points);
9. Drawing of lots.
- All matches will be held at Bahir Dar
- Time listed are UTC+3:00

Key to colour in group tables
The top finisher in each group and the best second-placed finisher will qualify for the Semi-finals

=== Group A ===
Pos	Team	Pld	W	D	L	GF	GA	GD	Pts	Qualification
1	Tanzania	2	1	1	0	2	1	+1	4	Advanced to Semi-finals
2	Uganda	2	0	2	0	1	1	0	2	
3	DR Congo	2	0	1	1	0	1	−1	1	

Source: Soccerway
Rules for classification: Group stage tiebreakers
18 July 2021
13:00

Uganda	0–0	DR Congo
	Report

Bahir Dar International Stadium, Bahir Dar
Referee: Teklu Mogos Tsegay (Eritrea)

21 July 2021
16:00

Tanzania	1–0	DR Congo
Lusajo 66'	Report

Bahir Dar International Stadium, Bahir Dar
Referee: Haileyesus Bazezew Belete (Ethiopia)

24 July 2021
16:00

Uganda	1–1	Tanzania
Mukwala 40'	Report	Raphael 31' (pen.)

Bahir Dar International Stadium, Bahir Dar
Referee: Saddam Houssein Mansour (Djibouti)

=== Group B ===
Pos	Team	Pld	W	D	L	GF	GA	GD	Pts	Qualification
1	Burundi	2	1	1	0	4	1	+3	4	Advanced to Semi-finals
2	Ethiopia (H)	2	0	2	0	4	4	0	2	
3	Eritrea	2	0	1	1	3	6	−3	1	

Source: Soccerway
Rules for classification: Group stage tiebreakers
(H) Hosts
17 July 2021
16:00

Ethiopia	3–3	Eritrea
Solomo 10'; Nassir 41' (pen.), 56'	Report	Ibrahim 38', 63', 72'

Bahir Dar International Stadium, Bahir Dar
Referee: Ronald Madanda (Uganda)

20 July 2021
16:00

Burundi	3–0	Eritrea
Nsihimirimana 16'; Rukundo 53'; Hakizimana 81'	Report

Bahir Dar International Stadium, Bahir Dar
Referee: Ring Malong (South Sudan)

23 July 2021
16:00

Ethiopia	1–1	Burundi
Gugesa 44'	Report	Hakzimana 66'

Bahir Dar International Stadium, Bahir Dar
Referee: Dickens Mimisa Nyagrowa (Kenya)

=== Group C ===
Pos	Team	Pld	W	D	L	GF	GA	GD	Pts	Qualification
1	Kenya	2	2	0	0	5	0	+5	6	Advance to Semi-finals
2	South Sudan	2	1	0	1	2	2	0	3	Qualified as a Best Runner up
3	Djibouti	2	0	0	2	0	5	−5	0	

Source: Soccerway
Rules for classification: Group stage tiebreakers
18 July 2021
16:00

Djibouti	0–3	Kenya
	Report	Collins 11'; Otieno 63'; Ochieng 88'

Bahir Dar International Stadium, Bahir Dar
Referee: Yannick Malala Kabanga (DR Congo)

21 July 2021
13:00

South Sudan	0–2	Kenya
	Report	Otieno 51'; Omalla 79'

Bahir Dar International Stadium, Bahir Dar
Referee: Thierry Nkurunziza (Burundi)

24 July 2021
13:00

Djibouti	0–2	South Sudan
	Report	Aluk 87'; Kornelio 90+5' (pen.)

Bahir Dar International Stadium, Bahir Dar
Referee: Ramadhan Kayoko (Tanzania)

== Knockout stage ==
- In the knockout stage, extra-time and a penalty shoot-out will be used to decide the winner if necessary.

=== Bracket ===
Semi-finals
27 July – Bahir Dar
Tanzania	1
South Sudan	0
27 July – Bahir Dar
Burundi (pen.)	0 (4)
Kenya	0 (2)

Final
30 July – Bahir Dar
Tanzania (pen.)	0 (6)
Burundi	0 (5)
Third place match
29 July– Bahir Dar
South Sudan	1
Kenya	0

== Semi-finals ==
27 July 2021
11:45

Tanzania	1–0	South Sudan
Naftal 65'	Report

Bahir Dar International Stadium, Bahir Dar
Referee: Haileyesus Bazezew Belete (Ethiopia)
27 July 2021
14:00

Burundi	0–0	Kenya
	Report
Penalties
	4–2

Bahir Dar International Stadium, Bahir Dar
Referee: Ronald Madanda (Uganda)

== Third place match ==
29 July 2021
11:45

South Sudan	1–0	Kenya
Gumanock 78'	Report

Bahir Dar International Stadium, Bahir Dar
Referee: Teklu Mogos Tsegay (Eritrea)

== Final ==
30 July 2021
14:00

Tanzania	0–0	Burundi
	Report
Penalties
	6–5

Bahir Dar International Stadium, Bahir Dar
Referee: Saddam Houssein Mansour (Djibouti)

== Statistics ==
=== Goalscorers ===
There have been 23 goals scored in 13 matches, for an average of 1.77 goals per match.

3 goals

- (Eritrea) Ali Suleiman Ibrahim

2 goals

- (Burundi) Issa Hakizimana
- (Ethiopia) Abubeker Nasir Ahmed

1 goal

- (Ethiopia) Chernet Gugsa
- (Ethiopia) Willam Solomo
- (Kenya) Njuguna Collins
- (Kenya) Otieno Reagan
- (Kenya) Oluoch Ochieng
- (Uganda) Relliant Lusajo
- (Burundi) Ismael Nsihimirimana
- (Burundi) Abdourahmani Rukundo
- (Uganda) Steven Mukwala
- (Tanzania) Brynson Raphael
- (South Sudan) Mabior Akeck Aluk
- (South Sudan) Dominic Angelo Kornelio
- (Kenya) Kevin Naftal
- (South Sudan) Dani Kumanock
