= Football in Uganda =

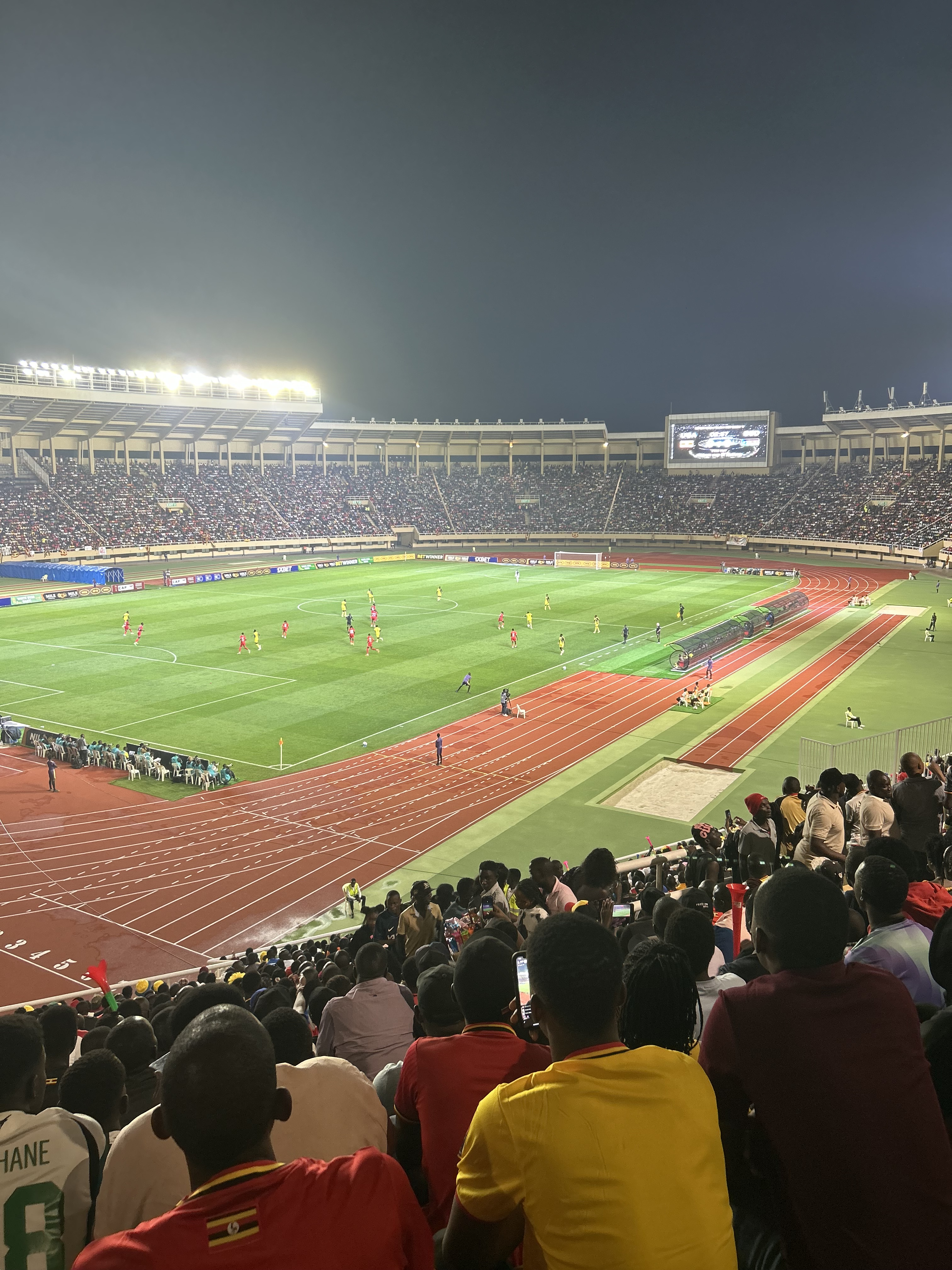
- The Uganda national football team playing at Mandela National Stadium in 2024
- Country: Uganda
- Governing body: Federation of Uganda Football Associations (FUFA)
- National team: Men's · women's
- First played: 1897; 129 years ago
- Registered players: 11,700+

National competitions
- Men's competition: FIFA World Cup; Africa Cup of Nations; African Nations League; Women's competition: FIFA Women's World Cup; Women's Africa Cup of Nations

Club competitions
- League: Men's competition Uganda Premier League FUFA Big League Regional Leagues; Women's competition FUFA Women Super League; FUFA Women Elite League: Cups: Men's competition Uganda Cup Buganda Masaza Cup Women's competition FUFA Women's Cup

International competitions
- Men's competition: FIFA Club World Cup; FIFA Intercontinental Cup; CAF Champions League; CAF Confederation Cup; CAF Super Cup; Women's competition: FIFA Women's Club World Cup; CAF Women's Champions League

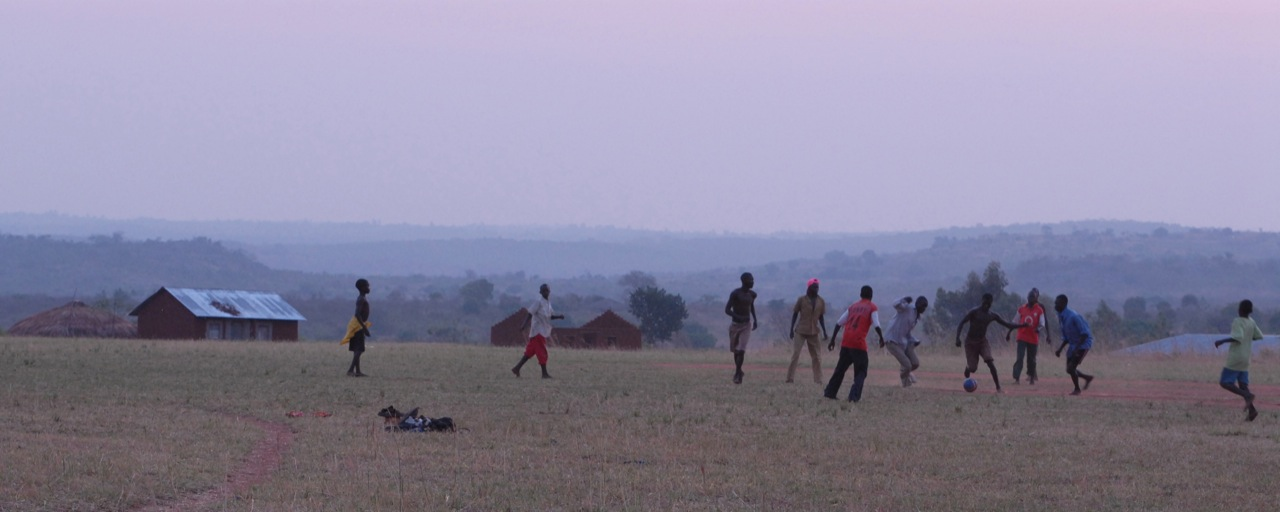
Young boys playing a casual game of football (soccer) in Arua District.

Football is the national sport in Uganda. The Uganda national football team, nicknamed The Cranes, is the national team of Uganda and is controlled by the Federation of Uganda Football Associations. Their best finish in the African Nations Cup was second in 1978

Association football is the most popular sport in Uganda. Approximately 35% of Ugandans are considered football fans.

== History of Ugandan football ==
=== Early development of the game ===
In the late 19th century the sport of association football first obtained a foothold in the major port cities of Eastern Africa before spreading into the interior with the establishment of railway lines, missionary schools and military bases for the colonial armies.

In the words of Sev A. Obura, the former General Secretary of the Uganda Olympic Committee, football was introduced into Uganda "by missionaries from the United Kingdom, our former colonial masters". These missionaries included Robert Henry Walker, George Lawrence Pilkington and Alexander Gordon Fraser. Foremost is Rev. Archdeacon R. H. Walker of the Namirembe Church Missionary Society who in 1897 introduced the game of football in Uganda having arranged for a football to be sent out from England. Walker was supported by G. L. Pilkington who diligently coached the boys at the Mengo school with games being first played at Kakeeka in Mengo on a large grass field situated between Kampala and Rubaga. The second playing field established was near Old Kampala hill below Lord Lugard's palace. Another missionary was A. G. Fraser who carried a football to Uganda in 1900 and four years later laid out a soccer field at King's School in Budo, a school established for the sons of Ugandan chiefs.

An officer of the British Army, Captain William Pulteney, also gave an early stimulus to the development of the football in Uganda while serving with the Uganda Rifles from February 1895 to September 1897.

=== United Old Budonians Club ===
The King's School Budo was at the forefront in the development of football in Uganda. Following the early work of A. G. Fraser, the Budo Old Boys was established around 1909 including the development of an alumni football team. Football practices took place regularly at the Coronation Ground at the Old Kampala, which became the Old Kampala Senior Secondary School Sports Ground. After the move of the Mengo High School from Namirembe to Budo Hill soon after 1927, the Budo Old Boys became the United Old Budonians Club. Over the next two decades the United Budonians remained a dominant force in Ugandan football and won the Kampala and District League as late as 1949.

=== Kabaka's Cup ===
The Kampala Football Association (KFA) was established in 1924 and a major cup competition followed known as the Kabaka's Cup presented by Kabaka Chwa II. Both the Budo School and the Old Boys fielded separate sides in the competition, each winning the trophy on a number of occasions. The nature of the competition eventually changed with teams like Public Works Department (PWD or Piida), Entebbe Government Printing Press (Puleesi), Kenya and Uganda Railways and Harbours (Leerwe) coming to prominence in the tournament. The game became more physical and as a consequence school teams like Budo School dropped out of the competition.

In the 1950s the Kabaka's Cup was administered by the Uganda Football Association and more than 30 teams entered the competition. By 1957 political problems had arisen when the Buganda Football Association were refused permission by the parent body to run the Kabaka's Cup competition. In turn the Buganda Football Association suspended all clubs which entered for the Kabaka's Cup.

Up until the launch of the Ugandan Cup in 1971 the Kabaka's Cup remained the most prestigious cup competition in the country. Other cup tournaments in the pre-independence years were the Aspro Cup, Buganda FA Challenge Cup, Coronation Cup, Luwangula Cup, Victory Cup and Wardle Cup.

=== Kampala and District Football League (KDFL) ===
The main league in Uganda spanning at least three decades was the Kampala and District Football League (KDFL). By 1966 the league had three tiers with a First Division, Second Division and a Third Division which was divided into two sections comprising a North Zone and a South Zone. Kampala City Council FC competed in the Third Division South and gained promotion to the next level for the 1967 season. Other teams that are known to have played in the KDFL include Aggrey Memorial, Army FC, Bitumastic, Coffee Kakira, Express FC, Kampala Police FC, KDS (Kampala District Bus Services), Kitegombwa, Luo Union, Mengo Old Boys, Mulago Hospital, Old Agrarians, Prisons FC Kampala, Railways, Nsambya, Sudanese FC, UEB, United Budonians and Young Salumbey. Little is known about champion clubs in the KDFL other than United Budonians winning the league in 1949 and Police taking the title in 1953 and the Railway African Club football team winning the second division in the same season. Express FC clinched the Division One title in the 1964 season.

The demise of the KDFL began with the formation of the National Football League in 1968 but the two competitions were run concurrently for a few seasons and the KDFL was still operating in 1971. The KDFL was then abandoned to allow room to a wider national competition with several divisions. Teams like Kampala City Council FC, Nsambya and NIC became members of the newly formed second division of the National League. In terms of records the highest goalscorer in KDFL history was Ali Kitonsa of Express FC who scored 54 goals in 18 appearances during the 1964 season. In terms of high scores Express defeated Kitegombwa 17–0 in the 1960 season although this result has probably been surpassed.

=== Key dates ===
- 1897 - R. H. Walker introduced the game of football to Uganda.
- 1909 - Budo Old Boys football team founded.
- 1924 - Kampala FA established.
- 1926 - Uganda and Kenya contested the Gossage Cup for the first time.
- 1932 - Uganda defeat Kenya 13–1 in the Gossage Cup final.
- late 1940s - Kampala FA became the Uganda FA.
- 1956 - National side travelled on first overseas tour to England.
- 1960 - Uganda FA affiliates to FIFA and CAF.
- 1960 - Stanley Matthews and the AIK Stockholm team make visits to Uganda.
- 1962 - National side reaches semi-finals of African Nations Cup.
- 1964 - Ali Kitonsa of Express FC scores 54 goals in a KDFL season.
- 1967 - Uganda FA renamed Federation of Uganda Football Associations (FUFA).
- 1968 - FUFA launch the National First Division which is won by Prisons FC.
- 1971 - FUFA launch the Ugandan Cup which is won by Coffee Kakira.
- 1972 - Simba FC are finalists in the African Cup of Champions Clubs.
- 1973 - National side win the CECAFA Cup.
- 1976 - National side win the CECAFA Cup.
- 1977 - National side win the CECAFA Cup.
- 1978 - National side loses to Ghana in final of African Nations Cup.
- 1978 - Kampala City Council FC win the CECAFA Clubs Cup.
- 1982 - FUFA launch the Super League which is won by SC Villa.
- 1987 - SC Villa win the CECAFA Clubs Cup.
- 1989 - National side win the CECAFA Cup.
- 1990 - SC Villa win their fifth consecutive Super League title.
- 1990 - National side win the CECAFA Cup.
- 1991 - SC Villa are finalists in the African Cup of Champions Clubs
- 1992 - SC Villa are finalists in the CAF Cup
- 1992 - National side win the CECAFA Cup.
- 1996 - National side win the CECAFA Cup.
- 1999 - Andrew Mukasa of SC Villa scores 45 goals in a USL season.
- 2000 - National side win the CECAFA Cup.
- 2003 - SC Villa win the Kagame Interclub Cup.
- 2003 - National side win the CECAFA Cup.
- 2004 - SC Villa win their seventh consecutive Super League title.
- 2005 - SC Villa win the Kagame Interclub Cup.
- 2006 - Police FC win the Kagame Interclub Cup.
- 2008 - National side win the CECAFA Cup.
- 2009 - FUFA launch the Big League which is won by Maroons FC.
- 2009 - National side win the CECAFA Cup.
- 2011 - National side win the CECAFA Cup.
- 2012 - National side win the CECAFA Cup.

== Leading figures ==
=== Badru Kakungulu Wasajja ===
Badru Kakungulu was a prince in the Buganda Royal Family, and leading political figure and leader of the Muslim community in Uganda in the twentieth century. In 1925, he played in the famous football match between Budo and Makerere for the Kabaka's Cup. He was vice-president of the Uganda Football Association and president of the Buganda Football Association. FUFA changed the title of the Uganda Cup to Kakungulu in 1992 in recognition of him.

=== Polycarp Kibuuka Kakooza ===
Polycarp Kakooza was a distinguished author, musician, sportsman, sports administrator, artist, and teacher. He composed the Buganda anthem in 1939 at the age of 25 and was secretary of the Uganda Football Association from 1949 to 1952. He was manager of the Ugandan team which traveled to England on the nation's first overseas tour in 1956. He later managed the Ugandan side in the African Nations Cup 1962 which reached the semi-finals of the competition. He was also former Secretary General of the Uganda Amateur Athletic Association (UAAA) and President of the Uganda Amateur Boxing Association (UABA). He died in Kampala on 12 January 2003, aged 90.

== Football association ==
In 1924 the Kampala Football Association (KFA) was formed, and Kabaka Chwa II was its first President. One of the first new clubs to affiliate to the KFA was the Nsambya Football Club in 1926.

In the late 1940s the Kampala Football Association (KFA) became the Uganda Football Association (UFA), Polycarp Kibuuka Kakooza being the secretary of the organisation from 1949 to 1952.

In 1967 the Uganda Football Association (UFA) was changed to the Federation of Uganda Football Associations (FUFA).

== Stadiums ==
=== Largest Ugandan football stadiums by capacity ===
| Overall Rank | Stadium | Location | Capacity | Built | Team | Notes |
|---|---|---|---|---|---|---|
| 1 | Mandela National Stadium | Kampala | 64,125 | 1997 | Uganda national football team | Previously known as the Namboole National Stadium. |
| 2 | Hoima City Stadium | Hoima | 20,000 | 2025 | Kitara | |
| 3 | Hamz Stadium | Kampala | 15,000 | 1926 | Uganda Revenue Authority | Previously known as the Nakivubo Stadium. |
| 4 | St. Mary's Stadium-Kitende | Entebbe | 15,000 | 2017 | Vipers | |
| 5 | MTN Omondi Stadium | Kampala | 10,000 | 1957 | Kampala Capital City Authority | |
| 6 | Mutesa II Stadium | Kampala | 8,000 | 1991 | | |
| 7 | Kadiba Stadium | Kampala | 7,000 | 2025 | Villa | |
| 8 | Bunamwaya Stadium | Wakiso Town | 5,000 | | | |

== Support ==
Twitter research from 2015 found that the most popular English Premier League club in Uganda was Arsenal, with 36% of Ugandan Premier League fans following the club, followed by Manchester United (23%) and Chelsea (12%).

== Attendances ==
The average attendance per top-flight football league season and the club with the highest average attendance:

| Season | League average | Best club | Best club average |
|---|---|---|---|
| 2023-24 | 871 | Vipers SC | 5,318 |

Source: League page on Wikipedia

== See also ==
- Ugandan Super League
- Ugandan Cup
- Lists of stadiums
