= Jackson Mayanja =

Ugandan footballer and coach (1959–2004)

Personal information
- Full name: Jackson Mayanja
- Date of birth: 27 June 1969
- Place of birth: Uganda
- Positions: Forward; midfielder

Senior career*
Years	Team	Apps	(Gls)
1987–1995	KCCA FC		
1995–1996	El-Masry SC		
1996	Espérance de Tunis		
1996–1999	KCCA FC		
1999–2000	Luwi FC		

International career
1988–1999	Uganda	28	(10)

Managerial career
- 2002–2004: URA FC
- 2004: Uganda (Assistant Coach)
- 2004–2005: Bunamwaya SC
- 2005–2010: KCCA FC
- 2010: Kagera FC
- 2011: Simba SC
- 2018: Kyetume FC
- 2021: AS Kigali (Assistant Coach)
- 2023: KCCA FC (Interim Coach)
- 2023–2025: Sunrise FC
- 2025–present: Uganda U-20
- * Club domestic league appearances and goals

Jackson Mayanja (born June 27, 1969), popularly known as "Mia Mia," is a retired Ugandan footballer and coach. He is recognized for his remarkable playing career with the Uganda Cranes and his influential coaching stints with clubs in Uganda and Tanzania.

== Early life and playing career ==
Jackson Mayanja was born on June 27, 1969. He was born to Francis Ssekimpi and Nakato Joyce, Jackson Mayanja and he attended Police Children School and later Kololo Secondary school where he began his football career and captained the school.

In 1985, he tried for Police FC but was not successful. KCCA FC scouted him and he made his debut for them in 1987 against Nsambya FC and he scored eight goals in the season to guide KCCA FC - then KKC FC to lift the Uganda Cup. In 1989, he sustained a knee injury that kept him on the sidelines until February 1990. He scored five goals and helped the team lift the Uganda cup that season. Scoring 11 and 23 goals in 1991 and 1992 respectively, he was signed by the Egyptian outfit El-Masry for a transfer rumored to be $30,000. At El-Masry, he became a fan favorite nicknamed "Mia Mia" due to his perfection and commitment to the club on the pitch.

After he fell out with the Egyptian club, he returned to KCC FC on the technical bench since he was still under contract. He was signed by the Tunisian club Esperance in 1996 and later returned to KCC FC where he helped them win the league title.

== Uganda Cranes career ==
Jackson Mayanja made his debut for the Uganda Cranes in 1988 during a friendly match against Zambia's KK XI, which ended in a 1–1 draw at Nakivubo Stadium. Later that year, he faced a pivotal moment when he missed a penalty in a FIFA World Cup qualifier against Malawi, though Uganda won the match 1–0. However, the team lost the return leg 3–1 in Blantyre and was eliminated from the qualifiers.

In 1990, Mayanja scored a crucial equalizer against Tanzania during the semifinals of the CECAFA Cup, a match that Uganda eventually won in a penalty shootout. The team went on to win the tournament, marking a significant highlight in his international career. He was also part of the squad that lifted the 1992 CECAFA Cup. Mayanja played a key role in the 1994 Africa Cup of Nations (AFCON) qualifiers, scoring six goals, though Uganda did not qualify for the tournament. In 1997, he was part of the team that won the CECAFA title in Khartoum, Sudan.

He retired from international football in 1999 after captaining Uganda in a loss against Tunisia. During the match, he asked to be substituted in the second half, marking the end of his international career. After retiring from the national team, Mayanja moved to Oman for a semi-professional stint with Luwi FC, retiring completely in 2000.

== Awards and titles ==
During his football career, Jackson Mayanja achieved numerous accolades at both club and national levels. He won two Uganda Premier League titles with Kampala City Council (KCC) FC in 1991 and 1997. Additionally, he secured two Uganda Cup titles with the same club in 1987 and 1990. On the international stage, Mayanja was instrumental in helping the Uganda Cranes clinch three CECAFA Cup titles in 1990, 1992, and 1996. Individually, he was recognized for his exceptional talent and was named Uganda Sports Press Association (USPA) Footballer of the Year twice, in 1993 and 1996.

== Coaching career ==
He began his coaching career in 2002 with URA FC/Lyantonde and guided them to the super league. He also coached Bunamwaya SC, KCCA FC, Kagera FC, Simba SC, Kyetume FC, AS Kigali (Assistant Coach) to Mike Mutebi in 2021, Uganda Cranes and Uganda Hippos (u20). In 2004, FUFA appointed Jackson Mayanja as Assistant Coach to Mohammed Abbas the then Uganda National Football team coach. He also served as an assistant coach for the Tanzanian national team. In 2023, he KCCA FC appointed Jackson ‘Mia Mia’ Mayanja as the Interim Head Coach until end of June 2023. In November 2023, Mayanja was appointed head coach of Sunrise FC in Rwanda, a position he held until June 2025.. In 2018, Jackson Mayanja launched Mia Mia Football Academy - to equip children with the basic football skills.

== Controversy ==
Mayanja was known for his fiery temperament on the field, which occasionally led to disciplinary issues. Notable incidents include a red card for dissent during a CAF match against AFC Leopards and another for kicking the ball away in a league game against Mbale Heroes, causing him to miss crucial fixtures due to suspension. In 2023, when KCCA FC identified him for the Assistant coach job, he insisted that he had built a huge name and brand that he jealously protects and thus, he couldn't settle for less.

== Career statistics ==
=== International ===
Appearances and goals by national team and year
National team	Year	Apps	Goals
Uganda	1988	3	0
Uganda	1989	–	
Uganda	1990	1	1
Uganda	1991	2	2
Uganda	1992	3	3
Uganda	1993	4	4
Uganda	1994	1	0
Uganda	1995	7	0
Uganda	1996	2	0
Uganda	1997	–	
Uganda	1998	3	0
Uganda	1999	2	0
Total		28	10

Scores and results list Uganda's goal tally first, score column indicates score after each Mayanja goal.

List of international goals scored by Jackson Mayanja
No.	Date	Venue	Opponent	Score	Result	Competition
1	17 December 1990	Amaan Stadium, Zanzibar City, Zanzibar	Tanzania	1–1	1–1	1990 CECAFA Cup
2	27 November 1991	Nakivubo Stadium, Kampala, Uganda	Sudan	1–0	2–0	1991 CECAFA Cup
3	27 November 1991	Nakivubo Stadium, Kampala, Uganda	Sudan	2–0	2–0	1991 CECAFA Cup
4	15 August 1992	Nakivubo Stadium, Kampala, Uganda	Ethiopia	1–0	3–1	1994 Africa Cup of Nations qualification
5	15 August 1992	Nakivubo Stadium, Kampala, Uganda	Ethiopia	2–0	3–1	1994 Africa Cup of Nations qualification
6	21 November 1992	Sheikh Amri Abeid Memorial Stadium, Arusha, Tanzania	Seychelles	1–0	5–2	1992 CECAFA Cup
7	10 April 1993	Al-Hilal Stadium, Omdurman, Sudan	Sudan	1–1	1–1	1994 Africa Cup of Nations qualification
8	24 April 1993	Addis Ababa Stadium, Addis Ababa, Ethiopia	Ethiopia	?–?	2–2	1994 Africa Cup of Nations qualification
9	24 April 1993	Addis Ababa Stadium, Addis Ababa, Ethiopia	Ethiopia	?–?	2–2	1994 Africa Cup of Nations qualification
10	24 July 1993	Nakivubo Stadium, Kampala, Uganda	Sudan	1–0	1–0	1994 Africa Cup of Nations qualification
