= Dogo Khan =

Kenyan Businessman

Dogo Khan, OGW is a Kisii-based businessman (Born 1950) who is credited with forming Kenyan Premier League club Shabana back in the early 1980s.

== Early life ==
Dogo was born in Bonyunyu Village, in Nyamira County, and schooled at Kisumu Primary School and Kisumu Boys High School. He later turned entrepreneur from where his business Shabana Hardware & General Stores lent a name to the Kenyan club Shabana which, after 17 years, returned to the Kenyan top flight in the year 2023. He funded the team in its early days, scouted and mentored talent such as Mike Okoth and Henry Motego, and managed the club which graced Africa by featuring in the 1988 African Cup of Champions Clubs.
