= William Ouma =

Kenyan footballer

Personal information
- Date of birth: 1945 (age 80–81)
- Place of birth: Ziwani, Kenya
- Position: Forward

Senior career*
Years	Team	Apps	(Gls)
1964–1974	Luo Union F.C.		
1974–1978	Gor Mahia		
1978–1980	Kisumu Hotstars		

International career
1965–1977	Kenya	66	(35)
- * Club domestic league appearances and goals

William 'Chege' Ouma is a Kenyan former footballer who played as a forward.

== Career ==
Ouma played for Luo Union F.C. from 1964 to 1974 before joining Gor Mahia where he stayed for four years. From 1978 he spent two years at Kisumu Hotstars. He is record goalscorer of the Kenya national team with 35 goals, scored in 66 appearances between 1965 and 1977.

== Personal life ==
In November 1968 Ouma received a nine-month jail sentence for attacking two other players with a meat cleaver in a drunken fight over a girl.

== Career statistics ==
Scores and results list Kenya's goal tally first, score column indicates score after each Ouma goal.

List of international goals scored by William Ouma
No.	Date	Venue	Opponent	Score	Result	Competition
1	28 February 1965	Nairobi, Kenya	Uganda		3–0	1965 African Cup of Nations qualification
2	28 February 1965	Nairobi, Kenya	Uganda		3–0	1965 African Cup of Nations qualification
3	12 April 1965		Sudan		3–4	Friendly
4	15 September 1965	Kitwe, Zambia	Zambia		3–2	Friendly
5	15 September 1965	Kitwe, Zambia	Zambia		3–2	Friendly
6	20 October 1965	Nairobi, Kenya	Tanzania		4–2	Jomo Kenyatta Cup
7	20 October 1965	Nairobi, Kenya	Tanzania		4–2	Jomo Kenyatta Cup
8	5 March 1966	Kampala, Uganda	Uganda		3–2	Friendly
9	30 September 1966	Zanzibar City, Tanzania	Tanzania		3–2	1966 Gossage Cup
10	25 February 1967	Khartoum, Sudan	Tanzania		2–0	Friendly
11	19 August 1967	Nairobi, Kenya	Congo-Kinshasa		5–4	Friendly
12	19 August 1967	Nairobi, Kenya	Congo-Kinshasa		5–4	Friendly
13	30 September 1967	Nairobi, Kenya	Uganda		3–1	1967 Challenge Cup
14	30 September 1967	Nairobi, Kenya	Uganda		3–1	1967 Challenge Cup
15	4 October 1967	Nairobi, Kenya	Zanzibar		6–0	1967 Challenge Cup
16	4 October 1967	Nairobi, Kenya	Zanzibar		6–0	1967 Challenge Cup
17	28 September 1969	Kampala, Uganda	Zanzibar		2–1	1969 Challenge Cup
18	11 November 1970	Nairobi, Kenya	Ethiopia		2–0	1972 African Cup of Nations qualification
19	24 June 1971	Nairobi, Kenya	Sudan		3–3	Friendly
20	25 September 1971	Nairobi, Kenya	Tanzania		1–1	1971 Challenge Cup
21	24 October 1971	Lusaka, Zambia	Zambia		1–0	Friendly
22	16 July 1972	Nairobi, Kenya	Sudan		1–0	1974 FIFA World Cup qualification
23	10 December 1972	Port Louis, Mauritius	Mauritius		3–1	1974 FIFA World Cup qualification
24	10 December 1972	Port Louis, Mauritius	Mauritius		3–1	1974 FIFA World Cup qualification
25	17 December 1972	Nairobi, Kenya	Mauritius		2–2	1974 FIFA World Cup qualification
26	17 December 1972	Nairobi, Kenya	Mauritius		2–2	1974 FIFA World Cup qualification
27	19 August 1973	Nairobi, Kenya	Zambia		2–2	1974 FIFA World Cup qualification
28	23 September 1973	Kampala, Uganda	Zanzibar		3–0	1973 CECAFA Cup
29	23 September 1973	Kampala, Uganda	Zanzibar		3–0	1973 CECAFA Cup
30	12 December 1973	Nairobi, Kenya	Zambia		3–3	Friendly
31	12 December 1973	Nairobi, Kenya	Zambia		3–3	Friendly
32	12 December 1973	Nairobi, Kenya	Zambia		3–3	Friendly
33	5 June 1975	Nairobi, Kenya	Ethiopia		2–1	Friendly
34	9 November 1975	Lusaka, Zambia	Malawi		2–2	1975 CECAFA Cup
35	29 June 1976	Victoria, Seychelles	Réunion		3–1	1976 Indian Ocean Tournament
