= Libya national football team results =

This page shows the Libyan national football team's record against other nations throughout history.

== Libya national football team head-to-head ==
Last match updated was against Uganda on 29 September 2026

Key
Positive balance (more Wins)
Neutral balance (Wins = Losses)
Negative balance (more Losses)

Opponents	Pld	W	D	L	GF	GA	GD
Algeria	32	6	4	22	17	44	−27
Angola	6	2	3	1	6	6	0
Argentina	1	0	0	1	1	3	−2
Bahrain	5	3	1	1	10	6	+4
Belarus	2	0	2	0	2	2	0
Benin	7	3	1	3	9	7	+2
Botswana	6	2	3	1	4	3	+1
Burkina Faso	4	2	0	2	7	6	+1
Ivory Coast	7	0	1	6	2	11	−9
Cameroon	9	1	3	5	4	11	−7
Canada	1	0	0	1	2	4	−2
Cape Verde	4	1	1	2	5	6	–1
Central African Republic	1	0	1	0	0	0	0
Chad	5	4	0	1	11	5	+6
Comoros	3	1	1	1	5	3	+2
Congo	3	0	3	0	3	3	0
DR Congo	10	2	4	4	9	15	−6
Egypt	22	4	2	16	17	52	−35
Equatorial Guinea	7	1	2	4	7	9	-2
Eswatini	4	3	0	1	10	4	+6
Ethiopia	10	6	1	3	13	11	+2
Gabon	6	3	1	2	6	4	+2
Gambia	2	1	1	0	2	1	+1
Ghana	11	3	6	2	9	9	0
Greece	1	0	0	1	0	4	−4
Guinea	5	2	0	3	5	8	−3
Indonesia	3	3	0	0	10	1	+9
Iran	1	0	0	1	0	4	−4
Iraq	10	1	3	6	6	14	−8
Jordan	11	4	4	3	15	12	+3
Kenya	6	3	1	2	6	4	+2
Kuwait	6	2	3	1	9	7	+2
Lebanon	5	3	0	2	12	8	+4
Lesotho	2	2	0	0	5	0	+5
Liberia	3	1	1	1	6	5	+1
Malawi	3	2	1	0	5	3	+2
Malaysia	2	0	2	0	2	2	0
Mali	7	3	1	3	10	9	+1
Malta	8	3	2	3	8	6	+2
Mauritius	1	1	0	0	2	1	+1
Mauritania	4	1	2	1	2	2	0
Morocco	21	2	6	13	14	41	−27
Mozambique	4	2	1	1	4	3	+1
Myanmar	1	0	0	1	1	3	−2
Namibia	2	1	0	1	2	2	0
Niger	10	5	5	0	17	9	+8
Nigeria	6	1	0	5	4	11	−7
North Yemen	2	2	0	0	29	1	+28
Oman	3	2	1	0	38	3	+35
Palestine	6	2	4	0	12	7	+5
Poland	1	0	0	1	0	5	−5
Qatar	3	1	0	2	2	4	−2
Rwanda	10	6	3	1	10	5	+5
São Tomé and Príncipe	4	3	0	1	14	2	+12
Saudi Arabia	3	3	0	0	9	2	+7
Senegal	6	3	1	2	7	6	+1
Seychelles	2	2	0	0	13	2	+11
South Africa	2	0	1	1	1	2	-1
South Korea	1	0	0	1	0	4	−4
Sudan	16	5	4	7	19	19	0
Syria	6	2	2	2	11	8	+3
Tanzania	5	3	1	1	6	4	+2
Thailand	1	0	1	0	2	2	0
Togo	9	4	4	1	15	8	+7
Tunisia	23	5	3	15	17	34	−17
Turkey	1	1	0	0	2	1	+1
United Arab Emirates	5	2	2	1	7	8	−1
Uganda	6	2	2	2	9	7	+2
Ukraine	2	0	1	1	1	4	−3
Uruguay	2	0	0	2	3	5	−2
Yemen	3	2	1	0	5	2	+3
Zambia	8	3	3	2	9	11	−2
Zanzibar	1	1	0	0	1	0	+1
Zimbabwe	3	0	2	1	1	2	−1
Total	423	143	109	171	548	542	+6
