= Abdallah Juma Ally =

Tanzanian footballer (born 1976)

Personal information
- Date of birth: 2 July 1976 (age 50)
- Place of birth: Tanzania
- Position: Forward

Senior career*
Years	Team	Apps	(Gls)
2002–2004	Mtibwa Sugar Turiani		
2004	Simba		
2004–2005	Mlandege		
2005–2010	Mtibwa Sugar Turiani		(20+)

International career
2002–2003	Tanzania	4	(0)
2003–2007	Zanzibar	13	(9)
- * Club domestic league appearances and goals

Abdallah Juma Ally (born 2 July 1976) is a Tanzanian former footballer who played as a striker in the Tanzania Mainland Premier League and also the Tanzania and Zanzibar national teams, the latter of which he is the top goalscorer.

He is notable for representing Zanzibar at the FIFI Wild Cup.

== Club career ==
Abdallah Juma Ally began his career at Mtibwa Sugar Turiani in 2002. He joined Simba in 2004, making enough appearances to receive a Tanzanian Mainland Premier League winners' medal, before leaving to join Mlandege during the same season.

He returned to Mtibwa Sugar Turiani in 2005 and retired there at the end of the 2009–10 season.

He finished third place in the Tanzanian Mainland Premier League twice with the club (2006, 2008–09) and he notably scored 20 goals for Mtibwa Sugar Turiani during the 2006 season.

== International career ==
=== Tanzania ===
Ally made his debut for Tanzania during a 2–0 friendly loss against Uganda on 23 October 2002. He would continue to play for Tanzania until his fourth and final cap came as Tanzania were eliminated from 2006 FIFA World Cup qualifying after losing 3–0 on aggregate against Kenya.

=== Zanzibar ===
Ally represented Zanzibar at the 2003, 2004, 2005 and 2007 editions of the CECAFA Cup, and also at the FIFI Wild Cup.

He would debut for Zanzibar on 2 December 2003 during a 2–2 draw against Rwanda in their final group stage match of the 2003 CECAFA Cup; he also scored his first two goals during this match. His last international cap would come on 18 December 2007 when Zanzibar were eliminated during the 2007 CECAFA Cup quarter-finals.

He ended his international career as Zanzibar's all time top goalscorer with 9 goals.

== Career statistics ==
=== International ===
As of match played 18 December 2007.

Appearances and goals by national team and year
National team	Year	Apps	Goals
Tanzania	2002	1	0
Tanzania	2003	3	0
Total		4	0
Zanzibar	2003	1	2
Zanzibar	2004	4	3
Zanzibar	2005	3	1
Zanzibar	2006	3	2
Zanzibar	2007	2	1
Total		13	9

Scores and results list Zanzibar's goal tally first, score column indicates score after each Ally goal.

List of international goals scored by Abdallah Juma Ally
No.	Date	Venue	Opponent	Score	Result	Competition	Ref.
1.	2 December 2003	Khartoum Stadium, Khartoum, Sudan	Rwanda	1–2	2–2	2003 CECAFA Cup	
2.	2 December 2003	Khartoum Stadium, Khartoum, Sudan	Rwanda	2–2	2–2	2003 CECAFA Cup	
3.	11 December 2004	Addis Ababa Stadium, Addis Ababa, Ethiopia	Rwanda	1–0	2–4	2004 CECAFA Cup	
4.	13 December 2004	Addis Ababa Stadium, Addis Ababa, Ethiopia	Tanzania	2–1	4–2	2004 CECAFA Cup	
5.	13 December 2004	Addis Ababa Stadium, Addis Ababa, Ethiopia	Tanzania	3–2	4–2	2004 CECAFA Cup	
6.	30 November 2005	Amahoro Stadium, Kigali, Rwanda	Burundi	1–1	2–1	2005 CECAFA Cup	
7.	31 May 2006	Millerntor-Stadion, Hamburg, Germany	Greenland	2–2	4–2	FIFI Wild Cup	
8.	31 May 2006	Millerntor-Stadion, Hamburg, Germany	Greenland	3–2	4–2	FIFI Wild Cup	
9.	13 December 2007	Sheikh Amri Abeid Stadium, Arusha, Tanzania	Sudan	2–2	2–2	2007 CECAFA Cup	

== Honours ==
Simba

- Tanzanian Mainland Premier League: 2004

Mtibwa Sugar Turiani

- Tanzanian Mainland Premier League: third place 2006, 2008–09

Zanzibar

- FIFI Wild Cup: runner-up 2006

== See also ==
- List of top international men's football goalscorers by country
