= Ally Mwadini =

Tanzanian footballer (born 1985)

Personal information
- Full name: Mwadini Ally Mwadini
- Date of birth: 3 November 1985 (age 40)
- Place of birth: Kibeni, Zanzibar North, Tanzania
- Height: 1.85 m (6 ft 1 in)
- Position: Goalkeeper

Senior career*
Years	Team	Apps	(Gls)
2009–2011	Mafunzo		
2011–2021	Azam	33+	(0+)

International career
2009–2015	Zanzibar	17	(0)
2012–2015	Tanzania	4	(0)
- * Club domestic league appearances and goals

Mwadini Ally Mwadini (born 3 November 1985) is a Tanzanian former footballer who played as a goalkeeper. He has played for both the Tanzania and Zanzibar national football teams.

== Club career ==
Mwadini started his career in the Zanzibar Premier League with Mafunzo, before joining Azam in 2011, helping them win a Tanzanian Premier League in the 2013–14 season. He also helped them reach the quarter-finals of the 2014 Kagame Interclub Cup, where they lost to eventual champions Sudanese side Al-Merrikh in a penalty shootout, before helping them win the competition in 2015 and 2018, being a substitute in both finals.

== International career ==
Mwadini made a total of 17 appearances for the Zanzibar national team between 2009 and 2015. His debut came in a 2009 CECAFA Cup Group C match against Burundi on 29 November, and helped Zanzibar reach the semi-finals. He also represented Zanzibar at the 2010, 2011, 2012, and 2015 CECAFA Cups. Following the 2012 CECAFA Cup, where Zanzibar finished third, he was named in the team of the tournament by Kawowo Sports, having notably made the winning save in a quarter-final penalty shootout against Burundi.

Mwadini also appeared in four friendlies for the Tanzania national team between 2012 and 2015. His debut came on 23 February 2012, as a substitute for Juma Kaseja in a 0–0 draw with the DR Congo. He was also called up to Tanzania's squads in the CAF's second round of 2014 FIFA World Cup qualification, but didn't play any matches.
