= 1995 CECAFA Cup =

Tournament details
- Host country: Uganda
- Dates: November 26 – December 9
- Teams: 8 (from CECAFA confederations)

Final positions
- Champions: Zanzibar (1st title)
- Runners-up: Uganda B

Tournament statistics
- Matches played: 16
- Goals scored: 38 (2.38 per match)

The 1995 CECAFA Cup was the 21st edition of the CECAFA Cup, a football tournament for members of the Council for East and Central Africa Football Associations (CECAFA). The competition was held in Uganda and began with the first matches in the group stage on November 26, 1995 and ended with the final on December 9, 1995.

Zanzibar and Uganda B contested the final which was played in Kampala. Zanzibar won the match 1–0 to win the competition for the first time. In the third-place match, Kenya defeated Ethiopia 2–1.

== Background ==
The CECAFA Cup, formerly Gossage Cup and the East and Central African Senior Challenge Cup, is a football competition held in East and Central Africa for members of the Council for East and Central Africa Football Associations (CECAFA). It was first played in 1926.

Tanzania were the defending champions having won the 1994 CECAFA Cup after beating Uganda 4–3 on penalties following a 2–2 draw in Nairobi, Kenya.

Zanzibar had never won the tournament before.

== Format ==
Eight teams took part in the competition. They were drawn into two single round robin groups of four teams. The winning team and the runner up from each group would contest the semi-finals which would decide the teams to contest the final and the third-place match.

== Group stage ==
=== Group A ===
Kenya won their group to advance to the semi-finals alongside Zanzibar.

| Team | Pts | Pld | W | D | L | GF | GA | GD |
|---|---|---|---|---|---|---|---|---|
| Kenya | 7 | 3 | 2 | 1 | 0 | 3 | 0 | +3 |
| Zanzibar | 6 | 3 | 2 | 0 | 1 | 3 | 3 | 0 |
| Uganda A | 2 | 3 | 0 | 2 | 1 | 0 | 1 | –1 |
| Rwanda | 1 | 3 | 0 | 1 | 2 | 1 | 3 | –2 |

November 26, 1995

| Uganda A | 0–0 | Rwanda |

Kampala
November 27, 1995

| Kenya | 2–0 | Zanzibar |
|---|---|---|
| Lwanga 40'; Motego 61' |

Kampala
November 29, 1995

| Zanzibar | 2–1 | Rwanda |

Kampala
November 30, 1995

| Kenya | 1–0 | Rwanda |

Kampala
November 30, 1995

| Uganda A | 0–1 | Zanzibar |

Kampala
December 2, 1995

| Uganda A | 0–0 | Kenya |

Kampala

=== Group B ===
Ethiopia won their group to advance to the semi-finals alongside Uganda B.

| Team | Pts | Pld | W | D | L | GF | GA | GD |
|---|---|---|---|---|---|---|---|---|
| Ethiopia | 7 | 3 | 2 | 1 | 0 | 8 | 2 | +6 |
| Uganda B | 6 | 3 | 2 | 0 | 1 | 5 | 3 | +2 |
| Tanzania | 4 | 3 | 1 | 1 | 1 | 10 | 4 | +6 |
| Somalia | 0 | 3 | 0 | 0 | 3 | 1 | 15 | –14 |

November 27, 1995

| Tanzania | 2–2 | Ethiopia |

Bugembe
November 28, 1995

| Uganda B | 3–1 | Somalia |

Bugembe
November 30, 1995

| Uganda B | 0–1 | Ethiopia |

Bugembe
December 1, 1995

| Tanzania | 7–0 | Somalia |

Bugembe
December 3, 1995

| Ethiopia | 5–0 | Somalia |

Bugembe
December 3, 1995

| Uganda B | 2–1 | Tanzania |

Bugembe

== Semi-finals ==
Uganda B defeated Kenya and Zanzibar to advance to the final.

December 6, 1995

| Uganda B | 1–0 | Kenya |

Kampala
December 6, 1995

| Ethiopia | 1–1 | Zanzibar |
Penalties
| | 5–6 |

Bugembe

== Third-place match ==
Kenya defeated Ethiopia to win the third-place match.

December 9, 1995

| Kenya | 2–1 | Ethiopia |

Kampala

== Final ==
Zanzibar defeated Uganda B to win the tournament.

December 9, 1995

| Zanzibar | 1–0 | Uganda B |

Kampala
