= Mike Origi =

Kenyan footballer (born 1967)

Personal information
- Full name: Michael Okoth Origi
- Date of birth: 16 November 1967 (age 58)
- Place of birth: Nairobi, Kenya
- Height: 1.89 m (6 ft 2 1/2 in)
- Position: Striker

Senior career*
Years	Team	Apps	(Gls)
1984–1988	Shabana		
1989–1991	Kenya Breweries		
1991–1992	Al Boshar		
1992–1996	KV Oostende	71	(11)
1996–1998	KRC Harelbeke	56	(11)
1998–2002	Genk	81	(20)
2002	Molenbeek	27	(10)
2002–2004	Heusden-Zolder	57	(9)
2004–2006	Tongeren	55	(25)

International career
1989–2004	Kenya	48	(17)
- * Club domestic league appearances and goals

Michael Okoth Origi (born 16 November 1967) is a Kenyan retired footballer. Initially playing as a goalkeeper he converted to a striker at Shabana, a position that he would feature in for both club and country.

He spent most of his professional career in Belgium, while at international level he represented the Kenya national football team on 48 occasions between 1989 and 2004, scoring 17 goals. He is the father of Belgian international footballer, Divock Origi.

== Club career ==
Okoth started his football career with Itierio Secondary School from where he was spotted by Shabana. He would feature for Shabana in the Kenyan Super League and at continental level in the African Champions Cup.

In 1992, he moved to Omani club Al Boshar and after the Africa Cup of Nations K.V. Oostende of the Belgian Second Division.

He would experience success with Racing Club Genk winning the 1998–99 Belgian First Division and the 1999-00 Belgian Cup.

Okoth would end his career in 2006 playing in the Belgian Third Division with K.S.K. Tongeren and later with Cobox 76.

== International career ==
Okoth earned his first international call up in the 1989 CECAFA Cup turning out for a Kenya 'B' team.

He would represent the Harambee Stars in the Africa Cup of Nations in 1990, 1992 and 2004.

Scores and results list Kenya's goal tally first, score column indicates score after each Origi goal.

Throughout his fifteen-year tenure with the national team, Okoth established himself as a primary attacking threat for the Harambee Stars, earning a total of 48 caps and scoring 17 goals.

His final international tournament came at the 2004 tournament in Tunisia where, at 36 years of age, his veteran presence bridged multiple generations of Kenyan football before he officially concluded his international career.

List of international goals scored by Mike Origi
No.	Date	Venue	Opponent	Score	Result	Competition	Ref.
1	8 July 1991	Lilongwe, Malawi	Malawi	1–0	1–1	Friendly	
2	28 July 1991	Moi International Sports Centre, Nairobi, Kenya	Sudan	2–0	2–1	1992 African Cup of Nations qualification	
3	30 November 1991	Uganda	Zanzibar	2–1	3–2	1991 CECAFA Cup	
4	24 April 1993	Nairobi City Stadium, Nairobi, Kenya	Lesotho	2–0	3–0	1994 African Cup of Nations qualification	
5	24 April 1993	Nairobi City Stadium, Nairobi, Kenya	Lesotho	3–0	3–0	1994 African Cup of Nations qualification	
6	24 July 1993	Moi International Sports Centre, Nairobi, Kenya	Mozambique	3–1	4–1	1994 African Cup of Nations qualification	
7	10 November 1996	Stade du 28 Septembre, Conakry, Guinea	Guinea	1–0	1–3	1998 FIFA World Cup qualification	
8	6 April 1997	Moi International Sports Centre, Nairobi, Kenya	Burkina Faso	1–2	4–3	1998 FIFA World Cup qualification	
9	6 April 1997	Moi International Sports Centre, Nairobi, Kenya	Burkina Faso	2–3	4–3	1998 FIFA World Cup qualification	
10	6 April 1997	Moi International Sports Centre, Nairobi, Kenya	Burkina Faso	4–3	4–3	1998 FIFA World Cup qualification	
11	18 July 1998	Nakivubo Stadium, Kampala, Uganda	Uganda	2–3	3–3	Friendly	
12	24 January 1999	Stade des Martyrs, Kinshasa, DR Congo	DR Congo	1–1	1–2	2000 African Cup of Nations qualification	
13	2 July 2000	Somhlolo National Stadium, Lobamba, Swaziland	Swaziland	2–3	2–3	2002 African Cup of Nations qualification	
14	15 July 2000	Mombasa Municipal Stadium, Mombasa, Kenya	Swaziland	2–0	3–0	2002 African Cup of Nations qualification	
15	3 October 2000	Moi International Sports Centre, Nairobi, Kenya	Burundi	1–0	2–3	Friendly	
16	2 June 2001	Moi International Sports Centre, Nairobi, Kenya	Morocco	1–0	1–1	2002 African Cup of Nations qualification	
17	15 November 2003	Moi International Sports Centre, Nairobi, Kenya	Tanzania	2–0	3–0	2006 FIFA World Cup qualification	

== Personal life ==
Okoth is of Luo ethnicity. His older brother Austin "Makamu" Oduor Origi was a defender and captain for Gor Mahia and the Kenya national football team. His younger brothers would also feature in the Kenya Super League, Anthony Origi for Kenya Breweries and Gerald Origi for Utalii FC.

Arnold Origi, his nephew and son to Austin Oduor is a goalkeeper for Norwegian Tippeligaen side Lillestrøm and the Kenya national team.

His son Divock Origi is also a professional footballer.
