= 1988 CECAFA Cup =

Tournament details
- Host country: Malawi
- Dates: November 6–19
- Teams: 8 (from CECAFA confederations)

Final positions
- Champions: Malawi (3rd title)
- Runners-up: Zambia

Tournament statistics
- Matches played: 16
- Goals scored: 25 (1.56 per match)

The 1988 CECAFA Cup was the 15th edition of the tournament. It was held in Malawi, and was won by the hosts. The matches were played between November 6–19.

== Group A ==
Played in Lilongwe

Team	Pts	Pld	W	D	L	GF	GA	GD
Malawi	5	3	2	1	0	4	0	+4
Kenya	3	3	1	1	1	2	3	–1
Tanzania	2	3	0	2	1	0	1	–1
Zanzibar	2	3	1	0	2	1	3	–2

November 6, 1988

Malawi	0–0	Tanzania

November 8, 1988

Kenya	2–0	Zanzibar
Motego ?

November 10, 1988

Malawi	1–0	Zanzibar

November 10, 1988

Kenya	0–0	Tanzania

November 12, 1988

Malawi	3–0	Kenya
Kayira; Chirwa

November 12, 1988

Zanzibar	1–0	Tanzania

== Group B ==
Played in Blantyre

Team	Pts	Pld	W	D	L	GF	GA	GD
Zambia	4	3	1	2	0	4	1	+3
Zimbabwe	4	3	1	2	0	3	2	+1
Ethiopia	3	3	1	1	1	3	3	0
Uganda	1	3	0	1	2	1	5	–4

November 6, 1988

Zambia	0–0	Ethiopia

November 8, 1988

Uganda	0–0	Zimbabwe

November 11, 1988

Zambia	1–1	Zimbabwe

November 11, 1988

Uganda	1–2	Ethiopia

November 13, 1988

Zambia	3–0	Uganda
Makinka ? ?

November 13, 1988

Zimbabwe	2–1	Ethiopia

== Semi-finals ==
November 16, 1988

Malawi	(abandoned)	Zimbabwe

Lilongwe

Abandoned in 107' (a.e.t.) at 0–0 due to power failure.

November 17, 1988

Malawi	2–0 (replay)	Zimbabwe
Sinalo; Kayira

Lilongwe

November 17, 1988

Zambia	1–0	Kenya

Blantyre

== Third place match ==
November 19, 1988

Kenya	0–0	Zimbabwe
Penalties
	3–2

Blantyre

== Final ==
November 19, 1988

Malawi	3–1 (a.e.t.)	Zambia
Chimodzi; Sinalo; Kayira		Goal

Blantyre
