= 1974 CECAFA Cup =

Tournament details
- Host country: Tanzania
- Teams: 6 (from CECAFA confederations)

Final positions
- Champions: Tanzania (1st title)
- Runners-up: Uganda

Tournament statistics
- Matches played: 7
- Goals scored: 17 (2.43 per match)

The 1974 CECAFA Cup was the second edition of the tournament. It was held in Tanzania, and is won by the hosts. The exact dates of the matches were not known.

== Group A ==
Team	Pts	Pld	W	D	L	GF	GA	GD
Tanzania	3	2	1	1	0	2	1	+1
Zambia	2	2	1	0	1	3	3	0
Kenya	1	2	0	1	1	2	3	–1

Tanzania	0–0	Kenya

Zambia	3–2	Kenya
Chanda		Ochieng

Tanzania	1–0	Zambia

== Group B ==
Team	Pts	Pld	W	D	L	GF	GA	GD
Uganda	3	2	1	1	0	3	2	+1
Zanzibar	2	2	1	0	1	3	3	0
Somalia	1	2	0	1	1	2	3	–1

Uganda	2–1	Zanzibar

Zanzibar	2–1	Somalia

Uganda	1–1	Somalia

== Final ==
Tanzania	1–1	Uganda
Penalties
	5–3
