= FIFI Wild Cup =

2006 FIFI Wild Cup
Tournament details
- Host country: Republic of St. Pauli (official); Germany (location)
- Dates: 29 May–3 June
- Teams: 6
- Venue: 1 (in 1 host city)

Final positions
- Champions: Northern Cyprus (1st title)
- Runners-up: Zanzibar
- Third place: Gibraltar
- Fourth place: Republic of St. Pauli

Tournament statistics
- Matches played: 10
- Goals scored: 33 (3.3 per match)

The FIFI Wild Cup was an alternative to the FIFA World Cup, held from May 29 to June 3, 2006 in Hamburg, Germany, prior to the official FIFA World Cup which started one week later. It was run by the Federation of International Football Independents (FIFI).

FIFI was a body composed of countries not recognized at the time by FIFA and those whose logistics or political disputes prevented them from playing representative football. The Millerntor-Stadion in Hamburg hosted all the tournament matches. The tournament was sponsored by a German online gambling consortium called myBet, as well as Goool.de Sportswear GmbH, who paid a combined €750,000 to fund the tournament. The tournament had 2 mascots, Schäfer and Schmitz. Media patronage was provided by TV stations DSF and ProSieben. The tournament was organized by Essen Agencies, Carat Sponsorship GmbH, and Western Star GmbH.

According to organizer Jorg Pommeranz, FIFI had to overcome various obstacles, such as China and FIFA applying pressure to exclude Tibet, and difficulties for players representing Northern Cyprus obtaining visas to enter Germany.

The tournament winners were the Turkish Republic of Northern Cyprus. Spectator attendance was reported as “relatively weak”, with an average of 400 fans per match, although this could have been affected by poor weather. Consequently, a second edition of the tournament was deemed to be unlikely, although they considered a 2010 edition to be hosted by Greenland.

== Participants ==
- Greenland — an autonomous country within the Danish Realm and under the control of the Football Association of Greenland.
- Northern Cyprus — an unrecognized state under the control of Cyprus Turkish Football Federation.
- Zanzibar — autonomous part of Tanzania but member of CAF. Their manager for the tournament was Oliver Pocher.
- Gibraltar — A British Overseas Territory. Gibraltar gained membership of UEFA in May 2013. The country gained membership of FIFA in May 2016.
- Tibet — an autonomous region of China.
- Republic of St. Pauli — representing the St. Pauli area of Hamburg, the host city. (FC St. Pauli's junior team played as the Republic of St. Pauli.)

Monaco was invited but withdrew before the tournament began.

== Group stage ==
=== Group A ===
Team	Pts	Pld	W	D	L	GF	GA	GD
Republic of St. Pauli	4	2	1	1	0	8	1	+7
Gibraltar	4	2	1	1	0	6	1	+5
Tibet	0	2	0	0	2	0	12	−12

29 May 2006

Republic of St. Pauli	1–1	Gibraltar
Demirci (?)		Casciaro (?)

Millerntor-Stadion, Hamburg
Attendance: ~400

30 May 2006

Republic of St. Pauli	7–0	Tibet
Yilmaz (?); Demirci (?); Daube (?)

Millerntor-Stadion, Hamburg
Attendance: ~400

31 May 2006

Tibet	0–5	Gibraltar
		Goal

Millerntor-Stadion, Hamburg
Attendance: ~400

=== Group B ===
Team	Pts	Pld	W	D	L	GF	GA	GD
Northern Cyprus	6	2	2	0	0	4	1	+3
Zanzibar	3	2	1	0	1	5	5	0
Greenland	0	2	0	0	2	2	5	−3

29 May 2006
18:00 CET

Northern Cyprus	1–0	Greenland
Oraloglu 55'

Millerntor-Stadion, Hamburg
Attendance: ~400
Referee: Tobias Mayer
(Germany)

30 May 2006

Northern Cyprus	3–1	Zanzibar
Morris 12' (o.g.); Kolcu 20' (pen.); Cerkez 60'		Hamad 43'

Millerntor-Stadion, Hamburg
Attendance: ~400
Referee: Peter Postel
(Germany)

31 May 2006
20:15 CET

Greenland	2–4	Zanzibar
Zeeb (?); Cortsen (?)		Mohammed (?); Ally (?)

Millerntor-Stadion, Hamburg
Attendance: ~400

== Knockout stage ==
Semi-finals
Northern Cyprus	2
Gibraltar	0
Republic of St. Pauli	1
Zanzibar	2

Final
Northern Cyprus	0 (4)
Zanzibar	0 (1)
Third place
Gibraltar	2
Republic of St. Pauli	1

=== Semi-finals ===
1 June 2006

Northern Cyprus	2–0	Gibraltar
Oraloglu 39'; Moreno 90+2' (o.g.)

Millerntor-Stadion, Hamburg
Attendance: ~400
Referee: Markus Dahmas
(Germany)

1 June 2006

Republic of St. Pauli	1–2	Zanzibar
Mauni 13'		Maise 10', 90'

Millerntor-Stadion, Hamburg
Attendance: ~400

=== Third-place match ===
3 June 2006

Republic of St. Pauli	1–2	Gibraltar
Goal		Goal

Millerntor-Stadion, Hamburg
Attendance: ~400

=== Final ===
3 June 2006

Northern Cyprus	0–0	Zanzibar
Penalties
Amcaoglu (penalty scored); Taşkıran (penalty scored); Uçaner (penalty scored); Ulusoy (penalty scored)	4–1	(penalty scored) Abdulla; (penalty missed) Mwinyi; (penalty missed) Ali

Millerntor-Stadion, Hamburg
Attendance: 4,122
Referee: Moritz Hermann
(Germany)

== Top Goalscorers ==
Note: Some goalscorers from Gibraltar and Republic of St. Pauli are not listed because there is incomplete information on those games.

4 Goals

- Abdul Yilmaz (Republic of St. Pauli)

3 Goals

- Hakan Demirci (Republic of St. Pauli)

2 Goals

- (Northern Cyprus) Ali Oraloğlu
- (Zanzibar) Abdallah Juma Ally
- (Zanzibar) Alek Mohamed
- (Zanzibar) Coaui Maise

1 Goal

- (Gibraltar) Lee Cascario
- (Gibraltar) Anders Cortsen
- (Greenland) Kassannguaq Zeeb
- (Northern Cyprus) Çagan Çerkez
- (Northern Cyprus) Derviş Colcu
- Dennis Daube (Republic of St. Pauli)
- Sierra Mauni (Republic of St. Pauli)
- (Zanzibar) Salum Ussi Hamad

Own goals

- (Gibraltar) Dylan Moreno (against Northern Cyprus)
- (Zanzibar) Agrey Morris (against Northern Cyprus)

== Final standings ==
Rank	Team	Pld	W	D	L	GF	GA	GD	Win %
1	Northern Cyprus	4	4	0	0	6	1	5	1.000
2	Zanzibar	4	2	0	2	7	6	1	.500
3	Gibraltar	4	2	1	1	8	4	4	.625
4	Republic of St. Pauli	4	1	1	2	10	5	5	.375
5	Greenland	2	0	0	2	2	5	-3	.000
6	Tibet	2	0	0	2	0	12	-12	.000

FIFI Wild Cup
(Northern Cyprus)
Northern Cyprus
1st title

== See also ==
- Viva World Cup
- CONIFA World Football Cup
- ELF Cup
- Non-FIFA international football
