= Abdulaziz Makame =

Tanzanian footballer

Personal information
- Full name: Abdulaziz Makame Hassan
- Date of birth: 24 June 1996 (age 30)
- Place of birth: Kikwajuni, Tanzania
- Height: 1.83 m (6 ft 0 in)
- Position: Forward

Team information
- Current team: Young Africans
- Number: 21

Senior career*
Years	Team	Apps	(Gls)
2015–2017	Mafunzo		
2017–2019	Taifa		
2019–	Young Africans		

International career^{‡}
2019	Tanzania	2	(0)
2017–	Zanzibar	10	(2)
- * Club domestic league appearances and goals as of 1 August 2020 ‡ National team caps and goals as of 1 August 2020

Abdulaziz Makame (born 24 June 1996) is a Tanzanian football striker who plays for Young Africans.
