= 1966 Gossage Cup =

Tournament details
- Host country: Zanzibar
- Dates: 24 September – 1 October
- Teams: 4 (from CECAFA confederations)

Final positions
- Champions: Kenya (12th title)
- Runners-up: Uganda

Tournament statistics
- Matches played: 6
- Goals scored: 16 (2.67 per match)

The 1966 Gossage Cup was the 38th and final edition of the Gossage Cup, before it was rebranded to the Challenge Cup the following year. It was hosted by Zanzibar, and won by Kenya. It was played between September 24 and October 1.

== Participants ==
Four nations competed.

- Kenya
- Tanzania
- Uganda
- Zanzibar

== Group ==
Team	Pld	W	D	L	GF	GA	GD	Pts
Kenya	3	2	1	0	6	3	+3	5
Uganda	3	1	2	0	3	0	+3	4
Tanzania	3	1	0	2	6	6	0	2
Zanzibar (H)	3	0	1	2	1	7	−6	1

Source: International Football
(H) Hosts

== Matches ==
24 September 1966

Zanzibar	1–3	Kenya

25 September 1966

Uganda	3–0	Tanzania

27 September 1966

Kenya	0–0	Uganda

28 September 1966

Zanzibar	0–4	Tanzania

30 September 1966

Kenya	3–2	Tanzania

1 October 1966

Zanzibar	0–0	Uganda

1966 Gossage Cup champions

Kenya
12th title
