= 1990 CECAFA Cup =

Tournament details
- Host country: Zanzibar
- Dates: 8–20 December
- Teams: 7 (from CECAFA confederations)

Final positions
- Champions: Uganda (5th title)
- Runners-up: Sudan
- Third place: Tanzania

Tournament statistics
- Matches played: 13
- Goals scored: 26 (2 per match)

The 1990 CECAFA Cup was the 17th edition of the CECAFA Cup, which involves teams from Southern and Central Africa. The tournament was held in Zanzibar.

== Group A ==
Team	Pts	Pld	W	D	L	GF	GA	GD
Tanzania	4	3	1	1	1	2	1	+1
Zanzibar	4	3	1	1	1	2	2	0
Malawi	4	3	1	1	1	2	2	0
Zimbabwe	4	3	1	1	1	1	2	–1

8 December 1990

Zanzibar	0–0	Tanzania

9 December 1990

Malawi	0–0	Zimbabwe

11 December 1990

Malawi	1–0	Tanzania
Gondwe 20'

12 December 1990

Zanzibar	0–1	Zimbabwe
		Max

14 December 1990

Zimbabwe	0–2	Tanzania

14 December 1990

Zanzibar	2–1	Malawi
Bakiri-Kibishi 36'; Aziz 43'		Singo 68'

== Group B ==
Team	Pts	Pld	W	D	L	GF	GA	GD
Sudan	4	2	1	1	0	4	3	+1
Uganda	2	2	0	2	0	4	4	0
Kenya	1	2	0	1	1	3	4	–1

9 December 1990

Kenya	2–2	Uganda
Owino; Odongo		P. Musisi (pen.); Alaro

12 December 1990

Sudan	2–1	Kenya
Karika 47'; Muntaser 53'		Motego 68'

14 December 1990

Uganda	2–2	Sudan
Kabugo 7'; Loro 77'		Karika 12'; Muntaser 50'

== Knock-out stages ==
Semi-finals
December 17
Zanzibar	0
Sudan (a.e.t.)	1
December 17
Uganda (pen.)	1 (6)
Tanzania	1 (5)

Final
December 22
Uganda	2
Sudan	0
Third place
December 19
Zanzibar	1
Tanzania	2

=== Semi-finals ===
17 December 1990

Zanzibar	0–1 (a.e.t.)	Sudan
		Abdel Majeed 99'

17 December 1990

Uganda	1–1	Tanzania
Mayanja 27'		Mogella 25'
Penalties
	6–5

=== Third Place Play Off ===
19 December 1990

Zanzibar	1–2	Tanzania

=== Final ===
20 December 1990

Uganda	2–0	Sudan
Szimba 34'; M. Musisi 84'

== Team statistics ==
Name	Played	Points	Won	Drawn	Lost	Goals for	Goals Against	Goal Difference	Win Percent	Goals per Game
Kenya	2	1	0	1	1	3	4	–1	0%	1.5
Malawi	3	4	1	1	1	2	2	0	33.3%	0.66
Sudan	4	7	2	1	1	5	3	+2	50%	1.25
Tanzania	4	4	1	1	2	3	2	+1	25%	0.75
Uganda	4	8	2	2	0	7	4	+3	50%	1.75
Zanzibar	4	4	1	1	2	3	4	–1	25%	0.5
Zimbabwe	3	4	1	1	1	1	2	–1	33.3%	0.33
