= 1975 CECAFA Cup =

Tournament details
- Host country: Zambia
- Dates: October 31 – November 9
- Teams: 6 (from CECAFA confederations)

Final positions
- Champions: Kenya (1st title)
- Runners-up: Malawi

Tournament statistics
- Matches played: 9
- Goals scored: 27 (3 per match)

The 1975 CECAFA Cup was the third edition of the tournament. It was held in Zambia, and was won by Kenya. The matches were played between October 31 and November 9.

== Group A ==
Team	Pts	Pld	W	D	L	GF	GA	GD
Kenya	3	2	1	1	0	3	2	+1
Uganda	3	2	1	1	0	2	1	+1
Zambia	0	2	0	0	2	1	3	–2

October 31, 1975

Zambia	1–2	Kenya
Chola		Ochieng

November 2, 1975

Zambia	0–1	Uganda
		Ouma

November 4, 1975

Kenya	1–1	Uganda
Ochieng		Nasur

== Group B ==
Team	Pts	Pld	W	D	L	GF	GA	GD
Malawi	4	2	2	0	0	7	3	+4
Tanzania	2	2	1	0	1	5	3	+2
Zanzibar	0	2	0	0	2	1	7	–6

November 1, 1975

Malawi	3–1	Tanzania
Phiri		Goal

November 3, 1975

Malawi	4–2	Zanzibar

November 5, 1975

Tanzania	4–0	Zanzibar

== Semi-finals ==
November 7, 1975

Malawi	2–1	Uganda

November 7, 1975

Kenya	3–2	Tanzania
Lukoye; Thigo		Goal

== Final ==
November 9, 1975

Kenya	2–2	Malawi
Ouma; Ochieng		Msiska 15'; Phiri 80'
Penalties
	2–1
