= Suleiman Selembe =

Tanzanian footballer

Personal information
- Full name: Suleiman Kassim Suleiman Selembe
- Date of birth: 18 October 1987 (age 39)
- Place of birth: Mkunguni, Tanzania
- Height: 1.78 m (5 ft 10 in)
- Position: Midfielder

Team information
- Current team: Malindi

Senior career*
Years	Team	Apps	(Gls)
–2009	Mafunzo		
2009–2011	Azam		
2011–2012	African Lyon		
2012–2014	Coastal Union		
2014–2015	Polisi		
2015–2017	Stand United		
2017–2018	Maji Maji		
2018–2019	OC Bukavu Dawa		
2019–2022	Malindi		

International career^{‡}
2010–2011	Tanzania	3	(0)
2009–2019	Zanzibar	32	(5)
- * Club domestic league appearances and goals as of 1 August 2022 ‡ National team caps and goals as of 1 August 2022

Suleiman Selembe (born 18 October 1987) is a Tanzanian former football midfielder.
