= 1965 Gossage Cup =

Tournament details
- Host country: Uganda
- Dates: 25 September – 2 October
- Teams: 4 (from CECAFA confederations)

Final positions
- Champions: Tanzania (5th title)
- Runners-up: Kenya
- Third place: Uganda
- Fourth place: Zanzibar

Tournament statistics
- Matches played: 6
- Goals scored: 23 (3.83 per match)

The 1965 Gossage Cup was the 37th edition of the Gossage Cup, an international football competition competed by the teams of CECAFA. It was hosted by Uganda, and won by Tanzania. It was played between September 25 and October 2.

== Participants ==
Four nations competed.

- Kenya
- Tanzania
- Uganda
- Zanzibar

== Group ==
Team	Pld	W	D	L	GF	GA	GD	Pts
Tanzania	3	2	1	0	6	1	+5	5
Kenya	3	2	0	1	8	5	+3	4
Uganda (H)	3	1	1	1	7	5	+2	3
Zanzibar	3	0	0	3	2	12	−10	0

Source: International Football
(H) Hosts

== Matches ==
25 September 1965

Uganda	4–1	Zanzibar

26 September 1965

Tanzania	2–0	Kenya

28 September 1965

Uganda	2–3	Kenya

29 September 1965

Tanzania	3–0	Zanzibar

1 October 1965

Kenya	5–1	Zanzibar

2 October 1965

Uganda	1–1	Zanzibar

1965 Gossage Cup champions

Tanzania
5th title
