= 2003 CECAFA Cup =

Tournament details
- Host country: Sudan
- Dates: 30 November – 10 December
- Teams: 8 (from CECAFA confederations)

Final positions
- Champions: Uganda (9th title)
- Runners-up: Rwanda
- Third place: Kenya

Tournament statistics
- Matches played: 10
- Goals scored: 28 (2.8 per match)
- Top scorer(s): (Sudan) Haitham Elrasheed (Kenya) James Omondi (3 goals each)

The 2003 CECAFA Cup was the 27th edition of the CECAFA Cup, which involves teams from Southern and Central Africa. The matches were played in Sudan, from 30 November to 10 December. Burundi, Djibouti and Somalia withdrew before the draw of the groups for the tournament, complaining of financial difficulties. Just before the tournament, Ethiopia withdrew, and Tanzania also withdrew after the tournament started. Tanzania originally withdrew on the 27 November 2003, after their government did not pay for travel arrangements to Sudan. A day later though, on the 28 November, Tanzanian business magnate Azim Dewji produced cash to pay for airplane tickets, but the connecting flight from Nairobi, Kenya, to Khartoum, Sudan, were all full. Yahya Mata, chairman of the interim committee of the Football Association of Tanzania (abbreviated to FAT), stated that "We have pulled out of the tournament, after failure to secure connecting flights from Nairobi to Khartoum", the second withdrawal within four days prompted ridicule. In July 2003, Tanzania had been fined $5,000 USD, and forced to pay $11,313 USD to Sudan for the team not showing up for their final qualification match for the 2004 OFC Nations Cup, who then cited financial difficulties, and were estimated to be in $100,000 USD of debt.

Including Tanzania, there were eight teams who competed at the tournament, compared to ten in the previous competition. A team withdrew from each group, Tanzania from group A and Ethiopia from group B before any matches were played, meaning that only three teams competed in each group, and only three matches were played in each group. Hosts Sudan won both of their group stage matches, and Rwanda also emerged from group A on goal difference. Kenya progressed from group B with a win and a draw, as did Uganda. Uganda and Rwanda beat Sudan and Kenya respectively, both on penalties. Kenya won the third place play-off, followed by Uganda beating Rwanda in the final to win the tournament.

== Background ==
The CECAFA Cup is considered Africa's oldest football tournament, and involves teams from Central and Southern Africa. The tournament was originally named the Gossage Cup, contested by the four nations of Kenya, Uganda, Tanganyika (modern day Tanzania), and Zanzibar, running from 1929 until 1965. In 1967, this became the East and Central African Senior Challenge Cup, often shortened to simply the Challenge Cup, which was competed for five years, until 1971, before the CECAFA Cup was introduced in 1973. The 2002 champions were Kenya, and they duly won their group in 2003, but were knocked out in the quarter-finals against Rwanda on penalties. The 2003 champions, Uganda, finished fourth in the 2002 competition.

== Participants ==
8 teams competed, three teams from the original tournament competed (excluding Tanganyika, which changed names and is currently called Tanzania).

- Ethiopia
- Eritrea
- Kenya
- Rwanda
- Sudan
- Tanzania
- Uganda
- Zanzibar

== Group stages ==
The group stage began on 30 November and ended on 4 December with both Group A and Group B's final matches. The matches were partaken every other day, and the groups played on the same days: the 30 November, the 2 December, and the 4 December. At the end of the group stage, the two teams who finished bottom of their group were eliminated, whereas the teams positioned in the top two slots in the groups progressed to the knock-out rounds. The group stage competitors were diminished by the withdrawal of both Tanzania and Ethiopia, one team from each group.

If two or more teams are equal on points on completion of the group matches, the following criteria are applied to determine the rankings (in descending order):

1. Number of points obtained in games between the teams involved;
2. Goal difference in games between the teams involved;
3. Goals scored in games between the teams involved;
4. Away goals scored in games between the teams involved;
5. Goal difference in all games;
6. Goals scored in all games;
7. Drawing of lots.

=== Group A ===
Team	Pld	W	D	L	GF	GA	GD	Pts
Sudan	2	2	0	0	7	0	+7	6
Rwanda	2	0	1	1	2	5	−3	1
Zanzibar	2	0	1	1	2	6	−4	1
Tanzania (W)	0	0	0	0	0	0	0	0

(W) Withdrew
30 November 2003

Zanzibar	0–4	Sudan
		Elrasheed 10', 45'; Galag 50'; Sinnar 90' (pen.)

Khartum

2 December 2003

Rwanda	2–2	Zanzibar
Karekezi 40' (pen.), 56'		Ally 55' (pen.), 65'

Khartum

4 December 2003

Sudan	3–0	Rwanda
Elrasheed 11'; Jebril 60'; Onsa 87'

Khartum

=== Group B ===
Team	Pld	W	D	L	GF	GA	GD	Pts
Kenya	2	1	1	0	4	3	+1	4
Uganda	2	1	1	0	3	2	+1	4
Eritrea	2	0	0	2	3	5	−2	0
Ethiopia (W)	0	0	0	0	0	0	0	0

(W) Withdrew
30 November 2003

Uganda	2–1	Eritrea
Kabagambe 43'; Kabeta 60'		Shinash 70'

Kassala

2 December 2003

Kenya	3–2	Eritrea
Omondi 27'; Mathenge 91'; Mulama 93'		Goitom 30', 48'

Kassala

4 December 2003

Uganda	1–1	Kenya
Obua 47'		Sunguti 93'

Kassala

== Knockout stages ==
Semi-finals
December 8 – Khartoum
Sudan	0 (3)
Uganda (pen.)	0 (4)
December 8 – Khartoum
Kenya	1 (3)
Rwanda (pen.)	1 (4)

Final
December 10 – Khartoum
Uganda	2
Rwanda	0
Third place
December 10 – Khartoum
Kenya	2
Sudan	1

=== Semi-finals ===
8 December 2003

Sudan	0–0	Uganda
Penalties
	3−4

Khartoum

8 December 2003

Kenya	1–1	Rwanda
Omondi 44'		Lomani 30'
Penalties
	3−4

Khartoum

=== Third-place match ===
10 December 2003

Kenya	2–1	Sudan
Sunguti 24'; Omondi 35'		Muhamoud 30' (pen.)

Khartoum

=== Final ===
10 December 2003

Uganda	2–0	Rwanda
Lubega 48'; Obua 54'

Khartoum

2003 CECAFA Cup champions

Uganda
9th title

== Team statistics ==
Teams are ranked using the same tie-breaking criteria as in the group stage, except for the top four teams.

Pos.	Team	Pld	W	D	L	Pts	GF	GA	GD
1	Uganda	4	2	2	0	8	5	2	+3
2	Rwanda	4	0	2	2	2	3	8	−5
**Third-place play-off**
3	Kenya	4	2	2	0	8	7	5	+2
4	Sudan	4	2	1	1	7	8	2	+6
**Eliminated in the group stages**
5	Zanzibar	2	0	1	1	1	2	6	−4
6	Eritrea	2	0	0	2	0	3	5	−2
=7	Ethiopia	0	0	0	0	0	0	0	0
=7	Tanzania	0	0	0	0	0	0	0	0
Total		10^{(1)}	6	4^{(2)}	6	26	28	28	0

Updated to games played on 10 December 2003. Team(s) rendered in italics represent(s) the host nation(s). The competition's winning team is rendered in bold.
^{(1)} – Total games lost not counted in total games played (total games lost = total games won)
^{(2)} – Total number of games drawn (tied) for all teams = Total number of games drawn (tied) ÷ 2 (both teams involved)
^{(3)} – As per statistical convention in football, matches decided in extra time are counted as wins and losses, while matches decided by penalty shoot-outs are counted as draws.
