= Maurice Sunguti =

Kenyan footballer (born 1977)

Personal information
- Full name: Maurice Sunguti Ngoka
- Date of birth: 6 October 1977 (age 49)
- Place of birth: Kenya
- Height: 1.69 m (5 ft 7 in)
- Position: Striker

Senior career*
| Years | Team | Apps | (Gls) |
| ?–1997 | AFC Leopards | | |
| 1999–2000 | Express | | |
| 2001–2002 | Villa | | |
| 2003 | Tusker | | (23) |
| 2003–2005 | Friska Viljor | 57 | (27) |
| 2006–2007 | Nam Định | | |
| 2007–2009 | Young Africans | | |
| 2009 | Nairobi Stima | | |
| 2010 | Friska Viljor | 11 | (7) |

International career
| 1997–2005 | Kenya | 32 | (14) |
- * Club domestic league appearances and goals

Maurice Sunguti (born 6 October 1977) is a Kenya international football striker who has played for clubs in Kenya, Uganda, Sweden, Vietnam and Tanzania.

== Career ==
Born in Kenya, Sunguti began his career with local side AFC Leopards. He left the club in 1997 and became a journeyman, playing professionally in the Superettan with Friska Viljor FC and winning the Tanzanian league twice with Young Africans S.C.

== International career ==
Sunguti represented the senior Kenya national football team from 1997 to 2004. He played at the 2004 African Cup of Nations finals. He also participated at the 2001 CECAFA Cup, scoring a goal against Eritrea.

== Honors ==
=== Club ===
AFC Leopards

- Kenyan Premier League

(gold) Champion (1): 1998

SC Villa

- Ugandan Premier League

(gold) Champions (2): 2001, 2002

- Ugandan Cup

(gold) Champion (1): 2002

Young Africans S.C. (Yanga)

- Tanzanian Premier League

(gold) Champions (2): 2007/8, 2008/9
