= 1996 CECAFA Cup =

Tournament details
- Host country: Sudan
- Dates: November 17–29
- Teams: 7 (from CECAFA confederations)

Final positions
- Champions: Uganda (7th title)
- Runners-up: Sudan

Tournament statistics
- Matches played: 13

The 1996 CECAFA Cup was the 22nd edition of the tournament. It was held in Sudan, and was won by Uganda. The matches were played between November 17–29.

Sudan sent two teams: Sudan A and Sudan B.

== Group stage ==
=== Group A ===
Team	Pts	Pld	W	D	L	GF	GA	GD
Sudan	4	2	1	1	0	4	3	+1
Uganda	4	2	1	1	0	2	1	+1
Tanzania	0	2	0	0	2	2	4	–2

November 17, 1996

Sudan	1–1	Uganda
Reyad 90'

November 22, 1996

Uganda	1–0	Tanzania

November 24, 1996

Sudan	3–2	Tanzania
Anas; Akef; Kome

=== Group B ===
Team
Kenya
Sudan-20
Zanzibar
Rwanda

November 18, 1996

Sudan-U20	1–2	Zanzibar

November 19, 1996

Kenya	2–1	Rwanda
Motego; Odhiambo

November 22, 1996

Sudan-U20	0–0 (uncertain)	Kenya

November 22, 1996

Rwanda	1–1	Zanzibar

November 24, 1996

Kenya	2–0	Zanzibar
Omollo; Odiaga

November 25, 1996

Sudan-U20	1–0	Rwanda

== Knockout stage ==
=== Semi-finals ===
November 27, 1996

Uganda	2–0	Kenya

November 27, 1996

Sudan	1–2	Sudan-U20

- Uganda Champion 1996 CECAFA Cup

=== Third place match ===
November 29, 1996

Sudan	1–1	Kenya
Penalties
	5–4

=== Final ===
November 29, 1996

Uganda	1–0	Sudan-20
Tenywa 26' (pen.)
