= Joseph Kabagambe =

Ugandan footballer (born 1984)

Joseph Kabagambe (born 3 September 1984) is a Ugandan international footballer who plays for Sudanese club Al-Nil Al-Hasahesa, as a striker.

== Career ==
Born in Mubare Sub-county, Kabale District, Kabagambe began playing football with local sides before joining Horizon F.C. in 2000. Kabagambe has played club football in Rwanda and Sudan.
