= 1991 CECAFA Cup =

Tournament details
- Host country: Uganda
- Dates: November 23 – December 7
- Teams: 7 (from CECAFA confederations)

Final positions
- Champions: Zambia (2nd title)
- Runners-up: Kenya

Tournament statistics
- Matches played: 13
- Goals scored: 37 (2.85 per match)

The 1991 CECAFA Cup was the 18th edition of the tournament. It was held in Uganda, and was won by Zambia. The matches were played between November 23 – December 7.

== Group stage ==
=== Group A ===
Team	Pts	Pld	W	D	L	GF	GA	GD
Uganda	4	2	2	0	0	7	0	+7
Sudan	1	2	0	1	1	1	3	–2
Tanzania	1	2	0	1	1	1	6	–5

November 24, 1991

Tanzania	1–1	Sudan

November 27, 1991

Uganda	2–0	Sudan

November 30, 1991

Uganda	5–0	Tanzania

=== Group B ===
Team	Pts	Pld	W	D	L	GF	GA	GD
Zambia	5	3	2	1	0	4	2	+2
Kenya	4	3	2	0	1	4	3	+1
Malawi	3	3	1	1	1	1	1	0
Zanzibar	0	3	0	0	3	4	7	–3

November 23, 1991

Zambia	1–0	Kenya

November 25, 1991

Malawi	1–0	Zanzibar
Lungu

November 27, 1991

Zambia	3–2	Zanzibar

November 28, 1991

Kenya	1–0	Malawi

November 30, 1991

Kenya	3–2	Zanzibar
Origi ? ?

December 1, 1991

Zambia	0–0	Malawi

== Knockout stage ==
=== Semi-finals ===
December 4, 1991

Kenya	3–1	Uganda

December 5, 1991

Zambia	3–2	Sudan

=== Third place match ===
December 7, 1991

Uganda	3–1	Sudan

Kampala

=== Final ===
December 7, 1991

Zambia	2–0	Kenya

Kampala
Attendance: 8,000
