= Joseph Owino (footballer) =

Burundian footballer (born 1984)

Personal information
- Date of birth: 6 April 1984 (age 42)
- Place of birth: Kampala, Uganda
- Height: 1.82 m (6 ft 0 in)
- Position: Defender

Senior career*
Years	Team	Apps	(Gls)
–2008	Villa		
2008–2009	URA		
2009–2011	Simba		
2011–2012	Azam		
2012–2013	URA		
2013–2015	Simba		
2015	Sofapaka	3	(0)
2016	URA		
2016–2017	Stand United		
2017–2019	Lipuli		

International career^{‡}
2009–2010	Uganda	10	(0)
- * Club domestic league appearances and goals as of 25 April 2021 ‡ National team caps and goals as of 25 April 2021

Joseph Owino (born 6 April 1984) is a retired Ugandan football defender.
