= Issa Hakizimana =

Burundian footballer

Personal information
- Date of birth: 28 August 1994 (age 32)
- Position: Defender

Team information
- Current team: Flambeau du Centre

Senior career*
Years	Team	Apps	(Gls)
- LLB Académic FC
2020	Futuro Kings		
2021–	Flambeau du Centre		

International career
- Burundi
- * Club domestic league appearances and goals

Issa Hakizimana (born 28 August 1994) is a Burundian professional footballer who plays as a defender for Football League club Flambeau du Centre FC and the Burundi national team.

== International career ==
He was invited by Lofty Naseem, the national team coach, to represent Burundi in the 2014 African Nations Championship held in South Africa.
