= 1976 CECAFA Cup =

Tournament details
- Host country: Zanzibar
- Dates: November 6–14
- Teams: 7 (from CECAFA confederations)

Final positions
- Champions: Uganda (2nd title)
- Runners-up: Zambia

Tournament statistics
- Matches played: 12
- Goals scored: 33 (2.75 per match)

The 1976 CECAFA Cup was the fourth edition of the tournament. It was held in Zanzibar, Tanzania, and was won by Uganda. The matches were played between November 6 and 14.

== Group A ==
| Team | Pts | Pld | W | D | L | GF | GA | GD |
|---|---|---|---|---|---|---|---|---|
| Zambia | 6 | 3 | 3 | 0 | 0 | 10 | 5 | +5 |
| Uganda | 4 | 3 | 2 | 0 | 1 | 5 | 3 | +2 |
| Zanzibar | 2 | 3 | 1 | 0 | 2 | 1 | 4 | –3 |
| Somalia | 0 | 3 | 0 | 0 | 3 | 2 | 7 | –5 |

November 6, 1976

| Zanzibar | 0–3 | Zambia |
|---|---|---|
| | | Chola 81', 82'; Kapita 34' |

Amaan Stadium, Zanzibar City

November 6, 1976

| Uganda | 2–0 | Somalia |
|---|---|---|
| Ayiekoh 34'; Nsereko 40' |

Amaan Stadium, Zanzibar City

November 8, 1976

| Zanzibar | 0–1 | Uganda |
|---|---|---|
| | | Ayiekoh 60' |

Amaan Stadium, Zanzibar City

November 8, 1976

| Zambia | 4–2 | Somalia |
|---|---|---|
| Chanda 30', 55'; Simulambo 7'; Sinyangwe 65' | | Abdi 25', 85' (pen.) |

Amaan Stadium, Zanzibar City

November 11, 1976

| Zanzibar | 1–0 | Somalia |
|---|---|---|
| Hamadi 70' |

Amaan Stadium, Zanzibar City

November 11, 1976

| Uganda | 2–3 | Zambia |
|---|---|---|
| Kisitu 52'; Nsereko 56' | | Sinyangwe 40', 88'; Simulambo 17' |

Amaan Stadium, Zanzibar City

== Group B ==
| Team | Pts | Pld | W | D | L | GF | GA | GD |
|---|---|---|---|---|---|---|---|---|
| Malawi | 2 | 2 | 0 | 2 | 0 | 3 | 3 | 0 |
| Kenya | 2 | 2 | 0 | 2 | 0 | 3 | 3 | 0 |
| Tanzania | 2 | 2 | 0 | 2 | 0 | 2 | 2 | 0 |

November 6, 1976

| Kenya | 1–1 | Tanzania |
|---|---|---|
| Osoro 18' | | Greyson 47' |

Amaan Stadium, Zanzibar City

November 7, 1976

| Tanzania | 1–1 | Malawi |
|---|---|---|
| Kibadeni 38' | | Chikafa 1' |

Amaan Stadium, Zanzibar City

November 9, 1976

| Malawi | 2–2 | Kenya |
|---|---|---|
| Gondwe 37'; Phiri 85' | | Mwakolo 33'; Ghazale 41' |

Amaan Stadium, Zanzibar City

== Semi-finals ==
November 12, 1976

| Uganda | 2–1 | Malawi |
|---|---|---|
| Nasur 20', 43' | | Nyama 72' |

Amaan Stadium, Zanzibar City

November 12, 1976

| Zambia | 2–0 | Kenya |
|---|---|---|
| Kapita 24'; Chanda 82' |

Amaan Stadium, Zanzibar City

== Final ==
November 14, 1976

| Uganda | 2–0 | Zambia |
|---|---|---|
| Ayiekoh 60'; Nasur 76' |

Amaan Stadium, Zanzibar City
Referee: M.B. Musa (Tanzania)
