= 1977 CECAFA Cup =

Tournament details
- Host country: Somalia
- Dates: November 25 – December 12
- Teams: 7 (from CECAFA confederations)

Final positions
- Champions: Uganda (3rd title)
- Runners-up: Zambia

Tournament statistics
- Matches played: 13
- Goals scored: 29 (2.23 per match)

The 1977 CECAFA Cup was the fifth edition of the tournament. It was held in Somalia, and was won by Uganda. All matches were played in Mogadishu Stadium, between November 25 and December 12.

== Group A ==
Team	Pts	Pld	W	D	L	GF	GA	GD
Kenya	4	3	2	0	1	5	3	+2
Uganda	3	3	1	1	1	4	3	+1
Somalia	3	3	1	1	1	2	2	0
Zanzibar	2	3	1	0	2	1	4	–3

November 25, 1977

Somalia	0–1	Kenya
		Adero

Mogadishu Stadium, Mogadishu

November 26, 1977

Zanzibar	1–0	Uganda

Mogadishu Stadium, Mogadishu

November 28, 1977

Uganda	3–1	Kenya

Mogadishu Stadium, Mogadishu

November 30, 1977

Somalia	1–0	Zanzibar

Mogadishu Stadium, Mogadishu

December 2, 1977

Kenya	3–0	Zanzibar

Mogadishu Stadium, Mogadishu

December 3, 1977

Somalia	1–1	Uganda

Mogadishu Stadium, Mogadishu

== Group B ==
Team	Pts	Pld	W	D	L	GF	GA	GD
Malawi	3	2	1	1	0	1	0	+1
Zambia	2	2	1	0	1	4	3	+1
Tanzania	1	2	0	1	1	2	4	–2

November 27, 1977

Zambia	4–2	Tanzania
Chola ? ?

Mogadishu Stadium, Mogadishu

November 29, 1977

Malawi	1–0	Zambia
Phiri

Mogadishu Stadium, Mogadishu

December 1, 1977

Malawi	0–0	Tanzania

Mogadishu Stadium, Mogadishu

== Semi-finals ==
December 5, 1977

Kenya	2–4	Zambia
Thigo; Adero		Chitalu ?

Mogadishu Stadium, Mogadishu

December 6, 1977

Malawi	0–1	Uganda

Mogadishu Stadium, Mogadishu

== Third place match ==
December 8, 1977

Kenya	1–2	Malawi
Adero		Phiri 25'; Malefula 77' (pen.)

Mogadishu Stadium, Mogadishu

== Final ==
December 9, 1977

Uganda	0–0	Zambia
Penalties
	5–3

Mogadishu Stadium, Mogadishu
