= 1989 CECAFA Cup =

Tournament details
- Host country: Kenya
- Dates: December 2–16
- Teams: 8 (from CECAFA confederations)

Final positions
- Champions: Uganda (4th title)
- Runners-up: Malawi

Tournament statistics
- Matches played: 16
- Goals scored: 35 (2.19 per match)

The 1989 CECAFA Cup was the 16th edition of the tournament. It was held in Kenya, and was won by Uganda. The matches were played between December 2–16.

Kenya sent two teams: Kenya A and Kenya B team.

== Group A ==
Team	Pts	Pld	W	D	L	GF	GA	GD
Kenya A	6	3	3	0	0	6	3	+3
Uganda	3	3	1	1	1	7	4	+3
Zimbabwe	3	3	1	1	1	5	3	+2
Tanzania	0	3	0	0	3	2	10	–8

December 2, 1989

Kenya A	2–1	Uganda

December 3, 1989

Zimbabwe	3–0	Tanzania

December 5, 1989

Kenya A	2–1	Tanzania

December 6, 1989

Uganda	1–1	Zimbabwe

December 8, 1989

Uganda	5–1	Tanzania

December 9, 1989

Kenya A	2–1	Zimbabwe

== Group B ==
Team	Pts	Pld	W	D	L	GF	GA	GD
Zambia	5	3	2	1	0	2	0	+2
Malawi	4	3	1	2	0	1	0	+4
Zanzibar	2	3	0	2	1	0	1	–1
Kenya B	1	3	0	1	2	0	2	–2

December 2, 1989

Malawi	0–0	Zanzibar

December ?, 1989

Zambia	1–0	Kenya B

December ?, 1989

Malawi	1–0	Kenya B

December 6, 1989

Zambia	1–0	Zanzibar

December ?, 1989

Zanzibar	0–0	Kenya B

December 9, 1989

Zambia	0–0	Malawi

== Semi-finals ==
December 13, 1989

Zambia	1–3	Uganda
Malitoli

December 14, 1989

Kenya A	0–1	Malawi

== Third place match ==
December 15, 1989

Kenya A	1–0	Zambia
Motego

== Final ==
December 16, 1989

Uganda	3–3 (a.e.t.)	Malawi
Hasule 12'; Vvubya 42'; Kato 85'		Dzikambane 5'; Chimodzi 18', 39'
Penalties
	2–1

Nyayo National Stadium, Nairobi
