= 1973 CECAFA Cup =

Tournament details
- Host country: Uganda
- Dates: 22–29 September
- Teams: 6 (from CECAFA confederations)

Final positions
- Champions: Uganda (1st title)
- Runners-up: Tanzania

Tournament statistics
- Matches played: 8
- Goals scored: 28 (3.5 per match)

The 1973 CECAFA Cup was the inaugural edition of the CECAFA Cup, and was held in Uganda. The CECAFA Cup is considered Africa's oldest football tournament, and involves teams from Central and Southern Africa. The matches in the 1973 tournament were played from 22 September 1973 until 29 September 1973. The tournament was originally the Gossage Cup, contested by the four nations of Kenya, Uganda, Tanzania, and Zanzibar, running from 1929 until 1965. In 1967, this became the East and Central African Senior Challenge Cup, often shortened to simply the Challenge Cup, which was competed for five years, until 1971, before the CECAFA Cup was introduced in 1973. Uganda, the hosts, won the Cup, beating Tanzania 2–1 in the final. The tournament lacked a third-place play-off, so the runners-up in the group stages, Kenya and Zambia, shared third place. After Uganda and Zambia drew in the group stages with the same number of points, goals conceded and goals scored, a play-off occurred, which Uganda won. The tournament has been expanded, and the modern-day tournament consists of 12 different teams (Ethiopia, South Sudan, Burundi, Rwanda, Sudan, and Eritrea have joined since 1973).

== Participants ==
Six nations competed: the original four teams from the Gossage Cup, plus two more teams:

- Kenya
- Somalia
- Tanzania
- Uganda
- Zambia B
- Zanzibar

== Group stages ==
The group stage began on 22 September and ended on 28 September with Group A's play-off. The matchdays alternated between group A and group B throughout the week, finishing with the group A play-off. After the end of the scheduled matches in group A, Uganda and Zanzibar were level on the traditional deciders listed below, so to decide which team qualified for the final a play-off was arranged, won by Uganda.

If two or more teams are equal on points on completion of the group matches, the following criteria are applied to determine the rankings (in descending order):

1. Number of points obtained in games between the teams involved;
2. Goal difference in games between the teams involved;
3. Goals scored in games between the teams involved;
4. Away goals scored in games between the teams involved;
5. Goal difference in all games;
6. Goals scored in all games;
7. Drawing of lots.

Key to colours in group tables
Group winners advance to the final
Second-placed teams come third place in the tournament
Team eliminated

=== Group A ===
Pos	Team	Pld	W	D	L	GF	GA	GD	Pts
1	Uganda	2	1	1	0	7	2	+5	3
2	Zambia B	2	1	1	0	7	2	+5	3
3	Somalia	2	0	0	2	2	12	−10	0

22 September 1973

Uganda	6–1	Somalia

24 September 1973

Zambia B	6–1	Somalia

26 September 1973

Uganda	1–1	Zambia B

==== Group A play-off ====
28 September 1973

Uganda	2–1	Zambia B

=== Group B ===
Pos	Team	Pld	W	D	L	GF	GA	GD	Pts
1	Tanzania	2	2	0	0	3	1	+2	4
2	Kenya	2	1	0	1	3	1	+2	2
3	Zanzibar	2	0	0	2	0	6	−6	0

23 September 1973

Kenya	2–0	Zanzibar
Ouma

25 September 1973

Tanzania	1–0	Zanzibar

27 September 1973

Tanzania	2–1	Kenya

== Final ==
29 September 1973

Uganda	2–1	Tanzania

1973 CECAFA Cup champions

Uganda
1st title

== Final rankings ==
Teams are ranked using the same tie-breaking criteria as in the group stage, except for the top four teams.

Pos	Team	Pld	W	D	L	GF	GA	GD	Pts	Result
1	Uganda (H)	5	4	1	0	11	4	+7	9	Champion
2	Tanzania	3	1	1	1	8	4	+4	3	2nd place
=3	Zambia	3	1	1	1	8	4	+4	3	3rd place (Note: Second placed in group stages)
=3	Kenya	2	1	0	1	3	1	+2	2	3rd place
5	Zanzibar	2	0	0	2	0	6	−6	0	(Note: Eliminated in the group stages)
6	Somalia	2	0	0	2	2	12	−10	0	(Note: Eliminated in the group stages)

Updated to match(es) played on 29 September 1973. Source:
Rules for classification: 2 points are awarded for a win, 1 for a draw, 0 for a defeat.
(H) Host nation
