= 1994 CECAFA Cup =

Tournament details
- Host country: Kenya
- Dates: November 26 – December 10
- Teams: 8 (from CECAFA confederations)

Final positions
- Champions: Tanzania (2nd title)
- Runners-up: Uganda

Tournament statistics
- Matches played: 16
- Goals scored: 39 (2.44 per match)

The 1994 CECAFA Cup was the 20th edition of the tournament. It was held in Kenya, and was won by Tanzania. The matches were played between November 26–December 10.

Kenya sent two teams: Kenya A and Kenya B.

== Group stage ==
=== Group A ===
Played in Nairobi

Team	Pts	Pld	W	D	L	GF	GA	GD
Tanzania	4	3	3	0	0	8	0	+8
Kenya A	4	3	2	0	1	7	3	+4
Somalia	4	3	1	0	2	3	8	–5
Djibouti	0	3	0	0	3	2	9	–7

November 26, 1994

Kenya A	3–1	Somalia

November 28, 1994

Kenya A	4–1	Djibouti
Nyangweso 19'; Yakhama 69'; Otieno 79'; Oduor 86'		Abdurrahman Abdi 56'

November 29, 1994

Tanzania	4–0	Somalia

December 1, 1994

Somalia	2–1	Djibouti

December 1, 1994

Kenya A	0–1	Tanzania

December 3, 1994

Tanzania	3–0	Djibouti

=== Group B ===
Team	Pts	Pld	W	D	L	GF	GA	GD
Uganda	7	3	2	1	0	4	0	+4
Eritrea	7	3	2	1	0	3	0	+3
Kenya B	3	3	1	0	2	3	6	–3
Seychelles	0	3	0	0	3	2	6	–4

November 27, 1994

Uganda	2–0	Kenya B

Mumias
November 29, 1994

Eritrea	1–0	Seychelles

Mumias
December 1, 1994

Eritrea	2–0	Kenya B

Mumias
December 1, 1994

Uganda	2–0	Seychelles

Nairobi
December 3, 1994

Uganda	0–0	Eritrea

Nairobi
December 3, 1994

Kenya B	3–2	Seychelles

Nairobi

== Knockout stage ==
=== Semi-finals ===
December 5, 1994

Kenya (A)	0–1	Uganda

Nairobi
December 5, 1994

Tanzania	1–0	Eritrea

Nairobi

=== Third place match ===
December 8, 1994

Kenya (A)	1–0	Eritrea

Nairobi

=== Final ===
December 10, 1994

Tanzania	2–2 (a.e.t.)	Uganda
Penalties
	4–3

Nairobi
