= CECAFA Cup =

- Organiser(s): CECAFA
- Founded: 1926
- Region: Africa
- Teams: 9
- Current champions: Uganda (40 title)
- Most championships: Uganda (40 titles)
- Website: cecafaonline.com
- 2024 CECAFA Cup

The CECAFA Cup, formerly the Gossage Cup (1926–1966) and the East and Central African Senior Challenge Cup (1967–1971), is described as the oldest football tournament in Africa. It is organized by the Council for East and Central Africa Football Associations (CECAFA).

== Cup history ==
The CECAFA Cup is the successor competition of the Gossage Cup, held 37 times from 1926 until 1966, and the East and Central African Senior Challenge Cup, held between 1967 and 1971.

In 2005 and 2006, the tournament was sponsored by the Ethiopian-Saudi businessman Sheikh Mohammed Al Amoudi, and was dubbed the Al Amoudi Senior Challenge Cup.

In August 2012, CECAFA signed a sponsorship deal worth US$450,000 with East African Breweries to have the cup renamed to the CECAFA Tusker Challenge Cup.

== Previous winners ==
=== Gossage Cup (1926–1966) and Challenge Cup (1967–1971) ===
The Gossage Cup and Challenge Cup was contested between Kenya, Uganda, Tanganyika and Zanzibar (Only in 1953 Ruanda-Urundi was competed too). The first match was played between the Kenyan and Ugandan national teams in May 1926, with Kenya winning 2–1 in a replay. Tanganyika participated since 1945 and Zanzibar since 1949. The tournament was sponsored by the soap manufacturer Gossage, owned by the British Lever Brothers. In 1967, the competition was renamed to the East and Central African Senior Challenge Cup.

Tanzania fields two national teams, Tanzania and Zanzibar, which is a holdover due to Zanzibar's independence until it merged with Tanzania in 1964.

=== CECAFA Senior Challenge Cup ===
With the formation of CECAFA in 1973, the tournament was renamed to the CECAFA Cup. For the 2021 edition, the tournament was renamed the CECAFA U-23 Challenge Cup, and has reverted to CECAFA Senior Challenge Cup afterwards again.

Key
†	Tournament not held or not officially recognised
‡	Title was shared between both teams competing in the final / Match was won on a penalty shootout

#	Year	Host	Final			Third place play-off			Teams
#	Year	Host	Winners	Score	Runners-up	Third place	Score	Fourth place	Teams
Gossage Cup
1	1926	Kenya	Kenya	2–1	Uganda	Only 2 teams			2
—	1927	Not held due to hosting dispute^{†}							
2	1928	Uganda	Uganda	4–0 or 1–0	Kenya	Only 2 teams			2
3	1929	Kenya	Uganda	5–3	Kenya	Only 2 teams			2
4	1930	Uganda	Uganda	5–0	Kenya	Only 2 teams			2
5	1931	Kenya	Kenya	2–1	Uganda	Only 2 teams			2
6	1932	Uganda	Uganda	13–1	Kenya	Only 2 teams			2
—	1933	Not held^{†}							
—	1934	Not held^{†}							
7	1935	Uganda	Uganda	5–1	Kenya	Only 2 teams			2
8	1936	Kenya	Uganda	3–1	Kenya	Only 2 teams			2
9	1937	Uganda	Uganda	9–5	Kenya	Only 2 teams			2
10	1938	Kenya	Uganda	3–1	Kenya	Only 2 teams			2
11	1939	Uganda	Uganda	5–2	Kenya	Only 2 teams			2
12	1940	Kenya	Uganda	6–3	Kenya	Only 2 teams			2
13	1941	Uganda	Kenya	4–3	Uganda	Only 2 teams			2
14	1942	Kenya	Kenya	4–3	Uganda	Only 2 teams			2
15	1943	Uganda	Uganda	2–1	Kenya	Only 2 teams			2
16	1944	Kenya	Kenya	2–1	Uganda	Only 2 teams			2
17	1945	Uganda	Uganda	4–1	Kenya	Tanganyika	Only 3 teams		3
18	1946	Kenya	Kenya	2–1	Uganda	Tanganyika	Only 3 teams		3
19	1947	Tanganyika	Uganda	4–2	Tanganyika	Kenya	Shared	Zanzibar^{[1]}	4
20	1948	Uganda	Uganda	2–1	Kenya	Tanganyika	Shared	Zanzibar^{[1]}	4
21	1949	Zanzibar	Tanganyika	2–0	Kenya	Uganda	Shared	Zanzibar^{[1]}	4
22	1950	Kenya	Tanganyika	2–1	Kenya	Uganda	Shared	Zanzibar^{[1]}	4
23	1951	Tanganyika	Tanganyika	3–2	Kenya	Uganda	Shared	Zanzibar^{[1]}	4
24	1952	Uganda	Uganda	6–3	Kenya	Tanganyika	Shared	Zanzibar^{[1]}	4
25	1953	Zanzibar	Kenya	6–2	Uganda	Tanganyika	Shared	Zanzibar^{[1]}	5
26	1954	Kenya	Uganda	4–1	Kenya	Tanganyika	Shared	Zanzibar^{[1]}	4
27	1955	Tanganyika	Uganda	5–1	Tanganyika	Kenya	Shared	Zanzibar^{[1]}	4
28	1956	Uganda	Uganda	3–2	Kenya	Zanzibar	3–2	Tanganyika	4
29	1957	Zanzibar	Uganda	2–1	Kenya	Tanganyika	Shared (3–3)	Zanzibar	4
30	1958	Kenya	Kenya	Round robin	Uganda	Tanganyika	Round robin	Zanzibar	4
31	1959	Tanganyika	Kenya	Round robin	Zanzibar	Tanganyika	Shared	Uganda	4
32	1960	Uganda	Kenya	Shared	Uganda	Tanganyika	Round robin	Zanzibar	4
33	1961	Kenya	Kenya	Round robin	Tanganyika	Uganda	Round robin	Zanzibar	4
34	1962	various venues	Uganda	Round robin	Tanganyika	Kenya	Round robin	Zanzibar	4
35	1963	Kenya	Uganda	Round robin	Kenya	Tanganyika	Round robin	Zanzibar	4
36	1964	Tanzania	Tanzania	Round robin	Kenya	Uganda	Round robin	Zanzibar	4
37	1965	Uganda	Tanzania	Round robin	Kenya	Uganda	Round robin	Zanzibar	4
38	1966	Zanzibar	Kenya	Round robin	Uganda	Tanzania	Round robin	Zanzibar	4
Challenge Cup
39/1	1967	Kenya	Kenya	Round robin	Uganda	Zanzibar	Round robin	Tanzania	4
40/2	1968	Tanzania	Uganda	Round robin	Kenya	Tanzania	Round robin	Zanzibar	4
41/3	1969	Uganda	Uganda	Round robin	Tanzania	Kenya	Round robin	Zanzibar	4
42/4	1970	Zanzibar	Uganda	Round robin	Tanzania	Zanzibar	Round robin	Kenya	4
43/5	1971	Kenya	Kenya	Round robin	Uganda^{[2]}	Tanzania^{[2]}	Round robin	Zanzibar	4
CECAFA Cup
44/1	1973	Uganda	Uganda	2–1	Tanzania	Kenya	Shared	Zambia^{[1]}	6
45/2	1974	Tanzania	Tanzania	1–1^{*}^{[A]}	Uganda	Zambia	Shared	Zanzibar^{[1]}	6
46/3	1975	Zambia	Kenya	0–0^{*}^{[B]}	Malawi	Tanzania	Shared	Uganda^{[1]}	6
47/4	1976	Zanzibar	Uganda	2–0	Zambia	Kenya	Shared	Malawi^{[1]}	7
48/5	1977	Somalia	Uganda	0–0^{*}^{[C]}	Zambia	Malawi	2–1	Kenya	7
49/6	1978	Malawi	Malawi	3–2	Zambia	Kenya	2–0	Uganda	5
50/7	1979	Kenya	Malawi	3–2	Kenya	Tanzania	2–1	Zanzibar	7
51/8	1980	Sudan	Sudan	1–0	Tanzania	Malawi	1–0	Zambia	7
52/9	1981	Tanzania	Kenya	1–0	Tanzania	Zambia	1–0	Uganda	8
53/10	1982	Uganda	Kenya	1–1^{*}^{[D]}	Uganda	Zimbabwe	3–0	Zanzibar	7
54/11	1983	Kenya	Kenya	1–0	Zimbabwe	Uganda	2–1	Malawi	9
55/12	1984	Uganda	Zambia	0–0^{*}^{[E]}	Malawi	Uganda	3–1	Kenya	8
56/13	1985	Zimbabwe	Zimbabwe	2–0	Kenya	Malawi	3–1	Uganda	6
—	1986	Not held (initially Somalia but later withdrew)							
57/14	1987	Ethiopia	Ethiopia	1–1^{*}^{[F]}	Zimbabwe	Uganda	2–0	Zanzibar	7
58/15	1988	Malawi	Malawi	3–1	Zambia	Kenya	0–0^{*}^{[G]}	Zimbabwe	8
59/16	1989	Kenya	Uganda	3–3^{*}^{[H]}	Malawi	Kenya	1–0	Zambia	8
60/17	1990	Zanzibar	Uganda	2–0	Sudan	Tanzania	2–1	Zanzibar	7
61/18	1991	Uganda	Zambia	2–0	Kenya	Uganda	3–1	Sudan	7
62/19	1992	Tanzania	Uganda	1–0	Tanzania B	Zambia	4–0	Malawi	9
—	1993	Not held (Initially Uganda but later withdrew)							
63/20	1994	Kenya	Tanzania	2–2^{*}^{[I]}	Uganda	Kenya	1–0	Eritrea	8
64/21	1995	Uganda	Zanzibar	1–0	Uganda B	Kenya	2–1	Ethiopia	8
65/22	1996	Sudan	Uganda	1–0	Sudan B	Sudan	1–1^{*}^{[K]}	Kenya	7
—	1997	Not held (CECAFA suspended)							
—	1998	Not held (CECAFA suspended)							
66/23	1999	Rwanda	Rwanda B	3–1	Kenya	Rwanda	0–0^{*}^{[L]}	Burundi	12
67/24	2000	Uganda	Uganda	2–0	Uganda B	Ethiopia	1–1^{*}^{[M]}	Rwanda	9
68/25	2001	Rwanda	Ethiopia	2–1	Kenya	Rwanda	1–0	Rwanda B	11
69/26	2002	Tanzania	Kenya	3–2	Tanzania	Rwanda	2–1	Uganda	10
70/27	2003	Sudan	Uganda	2–0	Rwanda	Kenya	2–1	Sudan	8
71/28	2004	Ethiopia	Ethiopia	3–0	Burundi	Sudan	2–1	Kenya	9
72/29	2005	Rwanda	Ethiopia	1–0	Rwanda	Zanzibar	0–0^{*}^{[N]}	Uganda	10
73/30	2006	Ethiopia	Sudan	0–0^{*}^{[O]}	Zambia	Rwanda	0–0^{*}^{[P]}	Uganda	11
74/31	2007	Tanzania	Sudan	2–2^{*}^{[Q]}	Rwanda	Uganda	2–0	Burundi	11
75/32	2008	Uganda	Uganda	1–0	Kenya	Tanzania	3–2	Burundi	10
76/33	2009	Kenya	Uganda	2–0	Rwanda	Zanzibar	1–0	Tanzania	12
77/34	2010	Tanzania	Tanzania	1–0	Côte d'Ivoire B	Uganda	4–3	Ethiopia	12
78/35	2011	Tanzania	Uganda	2–2^{*}^{[R]}	Rwanda	Sudan	1–0	Tanzania	12
79/36	2012	Uganda	Uganda	2–1	Kenya	Zanzibar	1–1^{*}^{[S]}	Tanzania	12
80/37	2013	Kenya	Kenya	2–0	Sudan	Zambia	1–1^{*}^{[T]}	Tanzania	12
—	2014	Not held (initially Ethiopia but later withdrew) §							
81/38	2015	Ethiopia	Uganda	1–0	Rwanda	Ethiopia	1–1^{*}^{[U]}	Sudan	12
—	2016	Not held (initially Sudan, then Kenya but both later withdrew) ≠							
82/39	2017	Kenya	Kenya	2–2^{*}^{[V]}	Zanzibar	Uganda	2–1	Burundi	9
—	2018	Not held (initially Zanzibar, then Kenya but both later withdrew)							
83/40	2019	Uganda	Uganda	3–0	Eritrea	Kenya	2–1	Tanzania	9
—	2020	Cancelled (Due to the COVID-19 pandemic)							
CECAFA U-23 Challenge Cup
84/1	2021	Ethiopia	Tanzania	0–0^{*}^{[W]}	Burundi	South Sudan	1–0	Kenya	9
CECAFA Cup
85/41	2024								

§ The 2014 CECAFA Cup would have been the 38th edition of the Cup. It was scheduled to take place in Ethiopia from 24 November to 9 December, but the nation withdrew from hosting the tournament in October due to "domestic and international engagements", according to CECAFA secretary-general Nicholas Musonye. Musonye also announced that Sudan as one of the countries that could have replaced Ethiopia as the hosts of the tournament. After none of the 12 member nations of CECAFA expressed an interest in hosting the tournament on short notice, it was announced on 27 November that CECAFA had cancelled the competition. Rwanda hosted the 2015 edition of the competition.
≠ The 2016 CECAFA Cup was to be the 39th edition of the annual CECAFA Cup. In September 2016, it was confirmed that Kenya would host the tournament. Originally, it was slated to be hosted in Sudan. In November 2016, Kenya announced they are not ready to host the tournament and CECAFA officials are looking to persuade Sudan to take over as hosts. In December 2016, CECAFA announced the 2016 edition of the tournament will be canceled.

==== Notes ====
- 1 – From 1945 to 1955 and 1973 to 1976 there was no third place play-off and both teams eliminated in the semi-finals were acknowledged as the third-placed team.
- 2 – In 1971 2nd place shared between Uganda and Tanzania.

- A – Score was 1–1 after 90 minutes. Tanzania won the shoot-out 5–3.
- B – Score was 0–0 after 90 minutes. Kenya won the shoot-out 4–3.
- C – Score was 0–0 after 90 minutes. Uganda won the shoot-out 5–3.
- D – Score was 1–1 after 90 minutes. Kenya won the shoot-out 4–3.
- E – Score was 0–0 after 90 minutes. Zambia won the shoot-out 3–0.
- F – Score was 1–1 after 90 minutes. Ethiopia won the shoot-out 5–4.
- G – Score was 0–0 after 90 minutes. Kenya won the shoot-out 3–2.
- H – Score was 3–3 after 90 minutes. Uganda won the shoot-out 2–1.
- I – Score was 2–2 after 90 minutes. Tanzania won the shoot-out 4–3.
- K – Score was 1–1 after 90 minutes. Sudan won the shoot-out 5–4.
- L – Score was 0–0 after 90 minutes. Rwanda won the shoot-out 3–2.
- M – Score was 1–1 after 90 minutes. Ethiopia won the shoot-out 5–3.
- N – Score was 0–0 after 90 minutes. Zanzibar won the shoot-out 5–4.
- O – Score was 0–0 after 90 minutes. Zambia won the shoot-out 11–10, but Sudan were given the title as Zambia were invited as guests.
- P – Score was 0–0 after 90 minutes. Rwanda won the shoot-out 4–2.
- Q – Score was 2–2 after 90 minutes. Sudan won the shoot-out 4–2.
- R – Score was 2–2 after 90 minutes. Uganda won the shoot-out 3–2.
- S – Score was 1–1 after 90 minutes. Zanzibar won the shoot-out 6–5.
- T – Score was 1–1 after 90 minutes. Zanzibar won the shoot-out 6–5.
- U – Score was 1–1 after 90 minutes. Ethiopia won the shoot-out 4–3.
- V – Score was 2–2 after 120 minutes. Kenya won the shoot-out 3–2.
- W – Score was 0–0 after 120 minutes. Tanzania won the shoot-out 6–5.

== Summary ==
FIFA A-level matches (A-level match rule). FIFA (B teams results, Ruanda-Urundi results, Rwanda results before 1978, Burundi results before 1972, All of Zanzibar results, Kenya results before 1960, Uganda results before 1960 and Tanzania results before 1964) are not counted as A-level match (All of them are unofficial before membership in FIFA). But this table consist of all matches.

=== 1926–1966 ===
Rank	Team	Part	Top4	Pld	W	D	L	GF	GA	Dif	Pts
1	Uganda	38	38	0	0	0	0	0	0	+0	0
2	Kenya	38	38	0	0	0	0	0	0	+0	0
3	Tanzania	22	22	0	0	0	0	0	0	+0	0
4	Zanzibar	20	20	41	4	4	33	37	141	–104	16
24	Ruanda-Urundi	1	0	1	0	0	1	1	9	–8	0

=== 1967–1971 ===
Rank	Team	Part	Top4	Pld	W	D	L	GF	GA	Dif	Pts
1	Uganda	5	5	15	11	2	2	31	10	+21	35
2	Kenya	5	5	15	7	3	5	32	18	+14	24
3	Tanzania	5	5	15	5	4	6	22	25	–3	19
4	Zanzibar	5	5	15	2	1	12	10	41	–31	7

=== 1973–2019 ===
Rank	Team	Part	Top4	Pld	W	D	L	GF	GA	Dif	Pts
1	Uganda	38	32	0	0	0	0	0	0	+0	0
2	Kenya	37	27	0	0	0	0	0	0	+0	0
3	Tanzania	36	15	0	0	0	0	0	0	+0	0
4	Zanzibar	35	10	0	0	0	0	0	0	+0	0
6	Ethiopia	25	8	0	0	0	0	0	0	+0	0
7	Malawi	21	11	0	0	0	0	0	0	+0	0
8	Sudan	26	12	0	0	0	0	0	0	+0	0
9	Zambia	21	12	0	0	0	0	0	0	+0	0
10	Zimbabwe	11	5	0	0	0	0	0	0	+0	0
11	Rwanda	23	12	0	0	0	0	0	0	+0	0
12	Rwanda B	2	1	0	0	0	0	0	0	+0	0
13	Burundi	14	5	0	0	0	0	0	0	+0	0
15	Eritrea	10	2	0	0	0	0	0	0	+0	0
5	Somalia	25	0	76	6	8	62	34	191	–157	26
23	Uganda B	2	2	10	7	0	3	13	8	+5	21
14	Ivory Coast B	1	1	6	4	0	2	7	3	+4	12
20	South Sudan	4	0	13	2	3	8	7	22	–15	9
22	Tanzania B	1	1	5	2	2	1	5	2	+3	8
21	Sudan B	1	1	5	2	1	2	4	4	+0	7
18	Libya	1	0	4	1	3	0	1	0	+1	6
17	Kenya B	2	0	6	1	1	4	3	8	–5	4
16	Djibouti	11	0	35	0	2	33	19	139	–120	2
19	Seychelles	2	0	6	0	0	6	5	16	–11	0

== Medals (1926–2023) ==
Rank	Nation	Gold	Silver	Bronze	Total
1	Uganda (UGA)	40	16	15	71
2	Kenya (KEN)	21	31	13	65
3	Tanzania (TAN)	9	12	17	38
4	Ethiopia (ETH)	4	0	2	6
5	Malawi (MAW)	3	3	4	10
6	Sudan (SUD)	3	3	3	9
7	Zambia (ZAM)	2	5	5	12
8	Rwanda (RWA)	1	6	4	11
9	Zanzibar (ZAN)	1	2	17	20
10	Zimbabwe (ZIM)	1	2	1	4
11	Burundi (BDI)	0	2	0	2
12	Eritrea (ERI)	0	1	0	1
12	Ivory Coast (CIV)	0	1	0	1
14	South Sudan (SSD)	0	0	1	1
Totals (14 entries)		85	84	82	251

Notes:

1. From 1926 to 1944 there was no 3rd place because of only 2 teams.
2. From 1947 to 1955 there was no 3rd place match and 3rd place shared.
3. 1957 and 1959 third place shared.
4. From 1973 to 1976 there was no 3rd place match and 3rd place shared.
5. 1960 1st place shared.
6. 1971 2nd place shared.

== See also ==
- CECAFA U-20 Championship
- CECAFA U-17 Championship
- CECAFA Women's Championship
- CECAFA U-20 Women's Championship
- CECAFA Club Cup
- CECAFA Nile Basin Cup

== Sources ==
- East and Central African Championship (CECAFA) – RSSSF
