= Zanzibar national football team =

Men's national association football team representing Zanzibar

Zanzibar
- Association: Zanzibar Football Federation (ZFF)
- Confederation: None (formerly CAF)
- Sub-confederation: CECAFA (Central & East Africa)
- Head coach: Vacant
- Most caps: Suleiman Selembe (32)
- Top scorer: Abdallah Juma Ally (9)
- Home stadium: Amaan Stadium
- FIFA code: ZAN
First colours	Second colours

First international
- Tanganyika 3–1 Zanzibar (Dar es Salaam, Tanganyika; 18 September 1947)

Biggest win
- Unofficial; Zanzibar 6–0 Raetia (Arbil, Iraq; 4 June 2012); Official; Zanzibar 4–0 Burundi (Mumias, Kenya; 29 November 2009)

Biggest defeat
- Kenya 10–0 Zanzibar (Nairobi, Kenya; 4 October 1961)

VIVA World Cup
- Appearances: 1 (first in 2012)
- Best result: Third place (2012)

CECAFA Cup
- Appearances: 35 (first in 1973)
- Best result: Champions (1995)

FIFI Wild Cup / ELF Cup
- Appearances: 2 (first in 2006)
- Best result: FIFI Wild Cup: Runners-up (2006); ELF Cup: Fourth place (2006)

The Zanzibar national football team represents Zanzibar in international football and is controlled by the Zanzibar Football Federation.

== History ==
Zanzibar is not a member of FIFA and is therefore not eligible to enter the World Cup. The island is part of the nation of the United Republic of Tanzania, which holds FIFA recognition at the international level. Prior to the union of Zanzibar and Tanganyika in 1964, Zanzibar was a fully independent member of the Confederation of African Football (CAF), but never qualified for the African Nations Cup.

Zanzibar was a provisional member of the N.F.-Board. The team placed second in the 2006 FIFI Wild Cup tournament, losing 4–1 on penalties to the Turkish Republic of Northern Cyprus in the final. For that tournament, they were coached by the German comedian Oliver Pocher.

Their U-20 team also played in the 2006 ELF Cup, finishing fourth of eight, winning one game (1–0 against Kyrgyzstan's national football team) and drawing twice (against Gagauzia and Greenland) before losing 5–0 to Northern Cyprus in the semifinal. They regularly play in the CECAFA Cup, which includes national teams from Central and East Africa, and in 1995 they became champions, winning the final match 1–0 against the host nation, Uganda.

In March 2017, Zanzibar were admitted to CAF, becoming its 55th member, only for their membership to be rescinded four months later, with CAF president Ahmad Ahmad claiming the region should never have been admitted as it is not a sovereign nation.

Zanzibar won their first international trophy since 1995 with the 2025 Mapinduzi Cup after defeating Burkina Faso 2–1 in the final.

== Results and fixtures ==
=== 2025 ===
3 January 2025 Mapinduzi Cup GS	Zanzibar	1–0	Tanzania A'	Tanzania
18:15	Salum 51'	Report		Stadium: Gombami Stadium

6 January 2025 Mapinduzi Cup GS	Zanzibar	0–1	Burkina Faso A'	Tanzania
18:15		Report	74' Sagne	Stadium: Gombami Stadium

10 January 2025 Mapinduzi Cup GS	Zanzibar	1–0	Kenya A'	Tanzania
18:15	Khatib 90+2'	Report		Stadium: Gombami Stadium

13 January 2025 Mapinduzi Cup F	Zanzibar	2–1	Burkina Faso A'	Tanzania
17:15	Hilika 41'; Cheda 90+2'	Report	74' Traore	Stadium: Gombami Stadium

28 July Friendly	Zanzibar	0–0	Nigeria A'	Zanzibar
16:00 UTC+3		Report		Stadium: MAO A Referee: Nassir Salum Siyah (Tanzania)

31 July Friendly	Zanzibar	2–2	Nigeria A'	Zanzibar
16:00 UTC+3		Report		Stadium: MAO A

=== 2026 ===
4 June Sikelia Cup	Sicily	Cancelled	Zanzibar	Capaci, Italy
18:00 UTC+2				Stadium: Campo Sportivo Antonino Cardinale
Note: Zanzibar’s participation in the Sikelia Cup was cancelled after the team failed to secure visas to enter Italy in time.

6 June Sikelia Cup	Zanzibar	Cancelled	Mauritius	Caltanissetta, Italy
18:00 UTC+2				Stadium: Stadio Marco Tomaselli
Note: Zanzibar’s participation in the Sikelia Cup was cancelled after the team failed to secure visas to enter Italy in time.

11 June Friendly	Zanzibar	Cancelled	Uganda	Zanzibar
20:15 UTC+3		Report		Stadium: Amaan Stadium
Note: Match cancelled due to health concerns related to Ebola prevention measures.

== Coaching history ==
- (Romania) Gheorghe Dungu (1972–1974)
- (Germany) Oliver Pocher (2005–2006)
- (Egypt) Abdel-Fattah Abbas (2006–2008)
- (Senegal) Souleymane Sané (2008–2011)
- (England) Stewart Hall (2010)
- (Tanzania) Hemed "Morocco" Suleiman (2017–2021)
- (Zanzibar) Hababuu Ali Omar (2021–2023)

== Notable players ==
- (Zanzibar) Ally Badru – played for El Qanah (Egypt) and Al Bashaer (Oman)

== Records ==
As of 14 December 2019
Players in bold are still active with Zanzibar.

=== Most appearances ===
Rank	Player	Caps	Goals	Career
1	Suleiman Selembe	32	5	2009–2019
2	Aggrey Morris	30	6	2004–2012
3	Nadir Haroub	28	1	2005–2015
4	Abdulghani Gulam Abdallah	18	1	2009–2012
4	Khamis Mcha Khamis	18	5	2007–2015
6	Ally Mwadini	17	0	2009–2015
7	Soud Abdallah Juma	14	1	2002–2007
7	Abdi Kassim	14	2	2002–2010
9	Abdallah Juma Ally	13	9	2002–2007
10	**Issa Haidar Dau**	11	0	2015–present
10	**Mwinyi Mngwali**	11	0	2015–present
10	Waziri Omar	11	0	2009–2013
10	Nassor Said	11	0	2009–2013
10	**Mudathir Yahya**	11	1	2015–present

=== Top goalscorers ===
Rank	Name	Goals	Caps	Ratio	Career
1	Abdallah Juma Ally	9	13	0.69	2002–2007
2	Aggrey Morris	6	30	0.2	2004–2012
3	Khamis Mcha Khamis	5	18	0.28	2007–2015
3	Suleiman Selembe	5	32	0.16	2009–2019
5	Alek Mohammed	2	1	2	2006
5	Ali Shiboli	2	2	1	2010
5	**Kassim Suleiman Khamis**	2	3	0.67	2017–present
5	Ahmed Ali Mkweche	2	4	0.5	2005–2007
5	**Khamis Mussa Makame**	2	7	0.29	2017–present
5	Salum Ussi	2	7	0.29	2002–2006
5	**Mohammed Juma**	2	8	0.25	2017–present
5	**Abdulaziz Makame**	2	9	0.22	2017–present
5	Abdi Kassim	2	14	0.14	2002–2010

== Competition records ==
=== CECAFA Cup ===
Zanzibar competed in the Gossage Cup from 1949 to 1967, when the competition was renamed to the East and Central African Senior Challenge Cup:

Gossage Cup record
Year	Round	Position	Pld	W	D*	L	GF	GA
(Tanganyika Territory) 1947	Fourth Place	4th	1	0	0	1	1	3
(Uganda) 1948	Third Place	3rd	1	0	0	1	1	3
(Zanzibar) 1949	Fourth Place	4th	1	0	0	1	2	3
(Kenya) 1950	Fourth Place	4th	1	0	0	1	0	4
(Tanganyika Territory) 1951	Third Place	3rd	1	0	0	1	0	1
(Uganda) 1952	Third Place	3rd	2	1	0	1	4	8
(Zanzibar) 1953	Third Place	3rd	1	0	0	1	1	5
(Kenya) 1954	Fourth Place	4th	1	0	0	1	0	5
(Tanganyika Territory) 1955	Third Place	3rd	1	0	0	1	-	-
(Uganda) 1956	Third Place	3rd	2	1	0	1	5	7
(Zanzibar) 1957	Third Place	3rd	2	0	1	1	4	8
(Kenya) 1958	Fourth Place	4th	3	0	1	2	3	8
(Tanganyika Territory) 1959	Runners-Up	2nd	3	1	1	1	3	7
(Uganda) 1960	Fourth Place	4th	3	0	0	3	3	11
(Kenya) 1961	Fourth Place	4th	3	0	0	3	1	15
1962	Fourth Place	4th	3	0	0	3	0	19
(Kenya) 1963	Fourth Place	4th	3	0	0	3	1	5
(Tanzania) 1964	Fourth Place	4th	3	1	0	2	5	10
(Uganda) 1965	Fourth Place	4th	3	0	0	3	2	12
(Zanzibar) 1966	Fourth Place	4th	3	0	1	2	1	7
Total	Runners-up	20/37	41	4	4	33	37	141

East and Central African Senior Challenge Cup record
Year	Round	Position	Pld	W	D *	L	GF	GA
(Kenya) 1967	Third Place	3rd	3	1	0	2	3	8
(Tanzania) 1968	Fourth Place	4th	3	0	0	3	0	8
(Uganda) 1969	Fourth Place	4th	3	0	0	3	1	12
(Zanzibar) 1970	Third Place	3rd	3	1	0	2	4	5
(Kenya) 1971	Fourth Place	4th	3	0	1	2	2	8
Total	Third place	5/5	15	2	1	12	10	41

CECAFA Cup record
Year	Round	Position	Pld	W	D *	L	GF	GA
(Uganda) 1973	Group stage	5th	2	0	0	2	0	6
(Tanzania) 1974	Third place	3rd	2	1	0	1	3	3
(Zambia) 1975	Group stage	6th	2	0	0	2	1	7
(Zanzibar) 1976	Group stage	6th	3	1	0	2	1	4
(Somalia) 1977	Group stage	6th	3	1	0	2	1	4
(Malawi) 1978	Did not enter							
(Kenya) 1979	Fourth place	4th	4	0	2	2	3	8
(Sudan) 1980	Group stage	5th	3	1	0	2	2	5
(Tanzania) 1981	Group stage	8th	3	0	0	3	3	9
(Uganda) 1982	Fourth place	4th	4	1	1	2	3	8
(Kenya) 1983	Group stage	8th	3	0	1	2	3	6
(Uganda) 1984	Group stage	8th	3	0	0	3	1	4
(Zimbabwe) 1985	Did not enter							
(Ethiopia) 1987	Fourth slace	4th	5	1	2	2	2	3
(Malawi) 1988	Group stage	7th	3	1	0	2	1	3
(Kenya) 1989	Group stage	6th	3	0	2	1	0	1
(Zanzibar) 1990	Fourth place	4th	5	1	1	3	3	5
(Uganda) 1991	Group stage	7th	3	0	0	3	4	7
(Tanzania) 1992	Group stage	8th	4	1	0	3	2	14
(Kenya) 1994	Did not enter							
(Uganda) 1995	Champions	1st	5	3	1	1	5	4
(Sudan) 1996	Group stage	5th	3	1	1	1	3	3
(Rwanda) 1999	Group stage	10th	2	0	1	1	1	3
(Uganda) 2000	Did not enter							
(Rwanda) 2001	Group stage	10th	2	0	0	2	0	8
(Tanzania) 2002	Group stage	7th	4	1	1	2	1	3
(Sudan) 2003	Group stage	5th	2	0	1	1	2	6
(Ethiopia) 2004	Group stage	7th	4	1	0	3	7	11
(Rwanda) 2005	Third place	3rd	6	3	2	1	7	6
(Ethiopia) 2006	Group stage	9th	2	0	1	1	0	4
(Tanzania) 2007	Quarter-finals	7th	3	1	2	0	5	3
(Uganda) 2008	Group stage	8th	4	1	1	2	3	5
(Kenya) 2009	Third place	3rd	6	2	2	2	6	3
(Tanzania) 2010	Quarter-finals	7th	4	1	2	1	4	3
(Tanzania) 2011	Quarter-finals	7th	4	1	1	2	5	4
(Uganda) 2012	Third place	3rd	6	1	4	1	5	6
(Kenya) 2013	Group stage	9th	3	1	0	2	3	6
(Ethiopia) 2015	Group stage	10th	3	1	0	2	3	6
(Kenya) 2017	Runners-up	2nd	6	3	2	1	9	6
(Uganda) 2019	Group stage	8th	3	0	1	2	1	3
Total	1 title	36/40	124	29	32	63	100	184

=== Africa Cup of Nations ===
In March 2017, Zanzibar were admitted to the Confederation of African Football, becoming eligible for the Africa Cup of Nations. The invitation was rescinded in July when FIFA rules forbade two teams from one nation.

Year	Round	Position	GP	W	D	L	GS	GA
African Cup of Nations
1957–1963	Did not enter							
1965–2023	Ineligible							

=== Non-FIFA tournaments ===
==== World tournaments ====
World tournaments record
Year	Round	Position	Pld	W	D*	L	GF	GA
FIFI Wild Cup and ELF Cup
2006	Runners-up	2nd	4	2	1	1	7	6
(Northern Cyprus) 2006	Fourth place	4th	5	1	3	1	5	9
VIVA World Cup
(Occitania) 2006	Did not enter							
(Sápmi) 2008	Did not enter							
(Padania) 2009	Did not enter							
(Gozo) 2010	Did not enter							
(Kurdistan Region) 2012	Third Place	3rd	4	3	0	1	16	4
CONIFA World Football Cup
(Sápmi) 2014	Withdrew							
(Abkhazia) 2016	Did not enter							
(Barawa) 2018	Did not enter							
Total	Third place	3/10	13	6	4	3	28	19

== Honours ==
=== Regional ===
- CECAFA Cup
  - (gold) Champions (1): 1995
  - (silver) Runners-up (1): 2017
  - (bronze) Third place (4): 1974^{s}, 2005, 2009, 2012

=== Non-FIFA competitions ===
- FIFI Wild Cup
  - (silver) Runners-up (1): 2006
- Viva World Cup
  - (bronze) Third place (1): 2012

=== Friendly ===
- Mapinduzi Cup
  - (gold) Champions (1): 2025

Notes

- ^{s} Shared titles.
