= Henry Motego =

Kenyan footballer (born 1964)

Personal information
- Full name: Henry Motego
- Date of birth: 21 May 1964 (age 62)
- Place of birth: Gucha District, Kenya
- Height: 1.68 m (5 ft 6 in)
- Position: Forward

Senior career*
Years	Team	Apps	(Gls)
1984–1989	Shabana Kisii		
1989–1991	Kenya Breweries		
1991–1992	Al-Oruba		
1992–2000	Kenya Breweries		

International career
1987–1996	Kenya	49	(12)

Managerial career
- 2002–2004: Tusker
- * Club domestic league appearances and goals

Henry Motego (born 21 May 1964) is a former Kenya international football forward who played for clubs in Kenya and Oman.

== Club career ==
Born in Gucha District, Motego began playing football in the local league for Shabana Kisii. He helped the club gain promotion to the Kenyan Premier League in 1988. After performing well with Shabana, he was noticed by Kenya Breweries F.C. and signed for the club in 1989.

In 1991, Motego signed for Omani league side Al-Oruba SC for two seasons.

Motego returned to play for Kenya Breweries until he retired in 2000.

== International career ==
Motego made several appearances for the Kenya national football team, including six FIFA World Cup qualifying matches. He played for Kenya at the 1988, 1990 and 1992 African Cup of Nations finals.

== Career as a manager ==
After he retired from playing, Motego became an assistant coach with Tusker. He was appointed manager in October 2002.
