= 2003 African Cup Winners' Cup =

Tournament details
- Dates: 16 February - 7 December 2003
- Teams: 36 (from 1 confederation)

Final positions
- Champions: (Tunisia) Étoile Sportive du Sahel (2nd title)
- Runners-up: (Nigeria) Julius Berger

Tournament statistics
- Matches played: 64
- Goals scored: 164 (2.56 per match)
- Top scorer(s): (Nigeria) Ogochukwu Obiakor, (Rwanda) Olivier Karekezi, (Rwanda) Jean Lomami (5)

The 2003 season of the African Cup Winners' Cup football club tournament was won by Étoile Sportive du Sahel in two-legged final victory against Julius Berger (now Bridge Boys F.C.). Étoile Sportive du Sahel never had the opportunity to defend their title as the African Cup Winners' Cup was merged with CAF Cup the following season into CAF Confederation Cup.

Thirty-six sides entered the competition. It was the first season when the CAF started to take disciplinary actions against teams withdrawing from the competition by banning them for three years. These actions were taken against Masvingo United from Zimbabwe who withdrew before the first leg of the preliminary round and JS Pobè from Benin who failed to show for their first leg match of the first round. Tanzania was not represented by JKT Ruvu Stars after the Tanzania Football Federation failed to confirm participation to CAF, while Liberian side Mighty Blue Angles were disqualified following failure to meet the deadline for submitting players' licenses. No disciplinary actions were taken against either team.

== Preliminary round ==
Team 1	Agg.	Team 2	1st leg	2nd leg
Anse Réunion (Seychelles)	w.o.	(Zimbabwe) Masvingo United		
Olympique de Moka (Mauritius)	3–2	(Madagascar) AS Fortior	3–1	0–1
RLDF (Lesotho)	3–7	(South Africa) Jomo Cosmos	2–2	1–5
JS Pobè (Benin)	2–0	(Niger) Akokana	1–0	1–0

Tanzania was not represented by JKT Ruvu Stars after the Tanzanian Football Federation failed to confirm participation to CAF

=== First leg ===
16 February 2003

Anse Réunion (Seychelles)	W.O.	(Zimbabwe) Masvingo United

Masvingo United withdrew before 1st leg and were subsequently banned for 3 years by CAF

16 February 2003

Olympique de Moka (Mauritius)	3-1	(Madagascar) AS Fortior
James Pierre-Louis 27', 65'; Mike Jocelyn 53'		Rodson Dedy Tojosoa 45'

Quartier Militaire Stadium, Quartier Militaire

16 February 2003

RLDF (Lesotho)	2-2	(South Africa) Jomo Cosmos
Maliehe Lesoetsia 30'; Seabata Ranchibe 36'		Patrick Tshisikane 21'; Tico-Tico 64'

Setsoto Stadium, Maseru

16 February 2003

JS Pobè (Benin)	1-0	(Niger) Akokana
Bana Johnson 42'

Jean-Pierre Gascon Stadium, Pobè

=== Second leg ===
2 March 2003

AS Fortior (Madagascar)	1-0	(Mauritius) Olympique de Moka
Romuald 80'

Barikadimy Stadium, Toamasina

Olympique de Moka won 3-2 on aggregate

2 March 2003

Jomo Cosmos (South Africa)	5-1	(Lesotho) RLDF
Tico-Tico 13', 30', 45'; Essau Kanyenda 22'; Percy Tshepo Malesa 86'		Dire Phiri 71'

Rand Stadium, Johannesburg

Jomo Cosmos won 7-3 on aggregate

2 March 2003

Akokana (Niger)	0-1	(Benin) JS Pobè
		Bana Johnson 44'

Stade d'Arlit, Arlit

JS Pobè won 2-0 on aggregate

== First round ==
Team 1	Agg.	Team 2	1st leg	2nd leg
Kenya Pipeline	3–3 (9–8 p)	(Seychelles) Anse Réunion	2-1	1-2
Olympique de Moka (Mauritius)	1-3	(Zambia) Power Dynamos	1-3	0-0
Mount Cameroon	2-1	(Equatorial Guinea) Akonangui FC	2-0	0-1
Asante Kotoko (Ghana)	w.o.	(Liberia) Mighty Blue Angels		
US Kenya (Democratic Republic of the Congo)	2-9	(Rwanda) APR FC	2-1	0-8
Étoile du Congo (Republic of the Congo)	2-1	(Angola) Petro de Luanda	1-0	1-1
Africa Sports (Ivory Coast)	3-2	(Togo) Dynamic Togolais	1-1	2-1
MAS Fès (Morocco)	2-3	(Guinea) Hafia FC	2-0	0-3
WA Tlemcen (Algeria)	2-2 (a)	(Libya) Al Hilal (Benghazi)	2-1	0-1
Wydad AC (Morocco)	2-0	(Mauritania) ASC Nasr	2-0	0-0
Baladeyet El Mahalla (Egypt)	4-1	(Uganda) Police FC	4-1	0-0
Medhin (Ethiopia)	0-4	(Sudan) Al-Hilal Club	0-2	0-2
Costa do Sol (Mozambique)	4-0	(South Africa) Jomo Cosmos	1-0	3-0
Julius Berger (Nigeria)	8-0	(Gabon) JS Libreville	4-0	4-0
Étoile Sportive du Sahel (Tunisia)	w.o.	(Benin) JS Pobè		
AS Douanes (Dakar) (Senegal)	0-3	(Mali) Cercle Olympique de Bamako	0-2	0-1

=== First leg ===
12 April 2003

Kenya Pipeline	2-1	(Seychelles) Anse Réunion
Godfrey Osama 58'; McDonald Mariga 83'		Amisy Vonhavy 50'

Ruaraka Stadium, Nairobi

12 April 2003

US Kenya (Democratic Republic of the Congo)	2-1	(Rwanda) APR FC
Kayembe 46'; Kabanda 70'		Jimmy Gatete 50'

Stade des Martyrs, Kinshasa

Match played in Kinshasa as Lubumbashi pitch (Stade Frederic Kibassa Maliba) considered into too poor condition

12 April 2003

Africa Sports (Ivory Coast)	1-1	(Togo) Dynamic Togolais
Eric Dagbei 6'		Y.V.A. Michel 45'

Stade Robert Champroux, Abidjan

12 April 2003

MAS Fès (Morocco)	2-0	(Guinea) Hafia FC
Yousef El Makboul 20'; Khalid El Hirech 31'

Fez Stadium, Fes

12 April 2003

WA Tlemcen (Algeria)	2-1	(Libya) Al Hilal (Benghazi)
Kheireddine Kherris 52'; Fares El Aouni 90+2'		Amado Diop 24'

Stade Akit Lotfi, Tlemcen

12 April 2003

Costa do Sol (Mozambique)	1-0	(South Africa) Jomo Cosmos
Bernardo Cumbe 64'

Estádio do Costa do Sol, Maputo

12 April 2003

Julius Berger (Nigeria)	4-0	(Gabon) US Bitam
Amechi Nwanze 10'; Omotayo Nufutau 20'; Ajibola Taiwo 43'; Obinna Okafor 78'

Onikan Stadium, Lagos

12 April 2003

Étoile Sportive du Sahel (Tunisia)	W.O.	(Benin) JS Pobè

JS Pobè did not show for the match and was subsequently banned for 3 years by CAF

13 April 2003

Olympique de Moka (Mauritius)	1-3	(Zambia) Power Dynamos
Westley Rouge 8'		Francis Kombe 28', 34'; Jean Lomami 85'

Stade George V, Curepipe

13 April 2003

Mount Cameroon	2-0	(Equatorial Guinea) Akonangui FC
Elvis Mokake 26'; Ebenezer Ache 60'

Stade de Moliko, Buea

13 April 2003

Asante Kotoko (Ghana)	W.O.	(Liberia) Mighty Blue Angels

Mighty Blue Angles disqualified following failure to meet dead-line for submitting players' licenses

13 April 2003

Étoile du Congo (Republic of the Congo)	1-0	(Angola) Petro de Luanda
Patrick Lolo 46'

Stade Alphonse Massemba-Débat, Brazzaville

13 April 2003

Wydad AC (Morocco)	2-0	(Mauritania) ASC Nasr
Mohamed Madihi ?' (pen.); Khetari ?'

Stade Mohamed V, Casablanca

13 April 2003

Baladeyet El Mahalla (Egypt)	4-1	(Uganda) Police FC
Mohamed Abdel Salam 10'; Osama Hamed 33'; Abdel-Majeed 54', 64'		Geofrey Massa ?'

El Mahalla Stadium, El Mahalla El Kubra

13 April 2003

Medhin (Ethiopia)	0-2	(Sudan) Al Hilal (Omdurman)
		Jebril 31'; Mujahed 73'

Addis Ababa Stadium, Addis Ababa

13 April 2003

AS Douanes (Dakar) (Senegal)	0-2	(Mali) Cercle Olympique de Bamako
		Seydou Traoré 5'; Amadou Diamouténé 43'

Stade Leopold Senghor, Dakar

=== Second leg ===
25 April 2003

ASC Nasr (Mauritania)	0-0	(Morocco) Wydad AC

Stade Sebkha, Sebkha

Wydad Casablanca won 2-0 on aggregate

25 April 2003

Police FC (Uganda)	0-0	(Egypt) Baladeyet El Mahalla

Nakivubo Stadium, Kampala

Baladeyet El Mahalla won 4-1 on aggregate

26 April 2003

Anse Réunion (Seychelles)	2-1	Kenya Pipeline
Amisy Vonhavy 54'		Jaoraveana Jocolyn 86'; Godfrey Osama 90'

Stade Linité, Victoria

Kenya Pipeline 3-3 Anse Réunion. Kenya Pipeline won 9-8 on PSO

26 April 2003

Power Dynamos (Zambia)	0-0	(Mauritius) Olympique de Moka

Arthur Davies Stadium, Kitwe

Power Dynamos won 3-1 on aggregate

26 April 2003

Dynamic Togolais (Togo)	1-2	(Ivory Coast) Africa Sports
Komlan Amewou 65'		A. Douglas 26'; Broud Kouadio 83'

Stade Agoè-Nyivé, Lomé

Africa Sports won 3-2 on aggregate

26 April 2003

Hafia FC (Guinea)	3-0	(Morocco) MAS Fès
Morlaye Touré 11', 44', 60'

Stade du 28 Septembre, Conakry

Hafia FC won 3-2 on aggregate

26 April 2003

Al Hilal (Benghazi) (Libya)	1-0	(Algeria) WA Tlemcen
Sharif Al Magani 85'

March 28 Stadium, Benghazi

Al Hilal (Benghazi) 2-2 WA Tlemcen on aggregate. Al Hilal (Benghazi) won on away goals (1-2)

27 April 2003

Akonangui FC (Equatorial Guinea)	1-0	Mount Cameroon
Sergio Elibiyo 1'

Estadio La Libertad, Bata

Mount Cameroon won 2-1 on aggregate

27 April 2003

APR FC (Rwanda)	8-0	(Democratic Republic of the Congo) US Kenya
Olivier Karekezi 11', 44', 58', 65'; Jimmy Gatete 26', 75'; Frederic Rusangawa 75'; Jimmy Mulisa 89'

Stade Amahoro, Kigali

APR FC won 9-2 on aggregate

27 April 2003

Petro de Luanda (Angola)	1-1	(Republic of the Congo) Étoile du Congo
Flávio 8'		Pi V. Ockoly 48'

Estádio da Cidadela, Luanda

Étoile du Congo won 2-1 on aggregate

27 April 2003

Al Hilal (Omdurman) (Sudan)	2-0	(Ethiopia) Medhin
Kabair 14'; Jolit 88'

Al Hilal Stadium, Omdurman

Al Hilal (Omdurman) won 4-0 on aggregate

27 April 2003

US Bitam (Gabon)	0-4	(Nigeria) Julius Berger
		Kabiru Alausa 63'; Omotayo Mufutau 25', 88'; Chukwuma Duru 90'

Stade Gaston Peyrille, Bitam

Julius Berger won 8-0 on aggregate

27 April 2003

Cercle Olympique de Bamako (Mali)	1-0	(Senegal) AS Douanes (Dakar)
Daouda Diakité 63'

Stade 26 Mars, Bamako

Cercle Olympique de Bamako won 3-0 on aggregate

== Second round ==
Team 1	Agg.	Team 2	1st leg	2nd leg
Kenya Pipeline	0-3	(Zambia) Power Dynamos	0-2	0-1
Mount Cameroon	4-5	(Ghana) Asante Kotoko	2-2	2-3
APR FC (Rwanda)	5-1	(Republic of the Congo) Étoile du Congo	3-0	2-1
Africa Sports (Ivory Coast)	3-2	(Guinea) Hafia FC	1-2	2-0
Al Hilal (Benghazi) (Libya)	2-6	(Morocco) Wydad AC	2-2	0-4
Baladeyet El Mahalla (Egypt)	4-2	(Sudan) Al-Hilal Club	4-2	0-0
Costa do Sol (Mozambique)	2-4	(Nigeria) Julius Berger	1-1	1-3
Étoile Sportive du Sahel (Tunisia)	4-2	(Mali) Cercle Olympique de Bamako	4-0	0-2

=== First leg ===
17 May 2003

Étoile Sportive du Sahel (Tunisia)	4 – 0	(Mali) Cercle Olympique de Bamako
Kais Zouaghi 16'; Saber Trabelsi 34'; Karim Haggui 44'; Ogochukwu Obiakor 70'

Stade Olympique de Sousse, Sousse

17 May 2003

Kenya Pipeline	0 – 2	(Zambia) Power Dynamos
		Jean Lomami 64'; Dears 90'

Ruaraka Stadium, Nairobi

17 May 2003

Al Hilal (Benghazi) (Libya)	2 – 2	(Morocco) Wydad AC
Sharif Al Magani 13'; Omar Diop 59'		Mourad Erraji 41', 75'

March 28 Stadium, Benghazi

18 May 2003

Mount Cameroon	2 – 2	(Ghana) Asante Kotoko
Valentin Atem 33'; Bessone Agbor 84'		Michael Osei 8', 17'

Stade de Moliko, Buea

18 May 2003

APR FC (Rwanda)	3 – 0	(Republic of the Congo) Étoile du Congo
Hassan Milly 13', 28'; Elias Ntaganda 37'

Stade Amahoro, Kigali

18 May 2003

Africa Sports (Ivory Coast)	1 – 2	(Guinea) Hafia FC
Didi Gnepa 71'		Ousmane Touré 45'; Amadou Diallo 47'

Stade Robert Champroux, Abidjan

18 May 2003

Baladeyet El Mahalla (Egypt)	4 – 2	(Sudan) Al Hilal (Omdurman)
Osama Hamed 43', ?'; Mohamed Abdel Salam ?'; Yasser Ali ?'		Haitham 18'; Kabir 30'

El Mahalla Stadium, El Mahalla El Kubra

18 May 2003

Costa do Sol (Mozambique)	1 – 1	(Nigeria) Julius Berger

Estádio do Costa do Sol, Maputo

=== Second leg ===
30 May 2003

Hafia FC (Guinea)	0 – 2	(Ivory Coast) Africa Sports
		Ble Dagbei 36'; Broud Kouadio 86'

Stade du 28 Septembre, Conakry

Africa Sports won 3-2 on aggregate

30 May 2003

Al Hilal (Omdurman) (Sudan)	0 – 0	(Egypt) Baladeyet El Mahalla

Al Hilal Stadium, Omdurman

Baladeyet El Mahalla won 4-2 on aggregate

31 May 2003

Power Dynamos (Zambia)	1 – 0	Kenya Pipeline
Jean Lomami 48'

Arthur Davies Stadium, Kitwe

Power Dynamos won 3-0 on aggregate

31 May 2003

Julius Berger (Nigeria)	3 – 1	(Mozambique) Costa do Sol
Omotayo Mufutau 44'; Shaibu Ishola 81', 88'		Tó 36'

Onikan Stadium, Lagos

Julius Berger won 4-2 on aggregate

1 June 2003

Asante Kotoko (Ghana)	3 – 2	Mount Cameroon
Nana Arhin Duah 38'; Isaac Boakye 48', 87' (pen.)		Zeh Zanga 40'; Fondongbe Atem 76'

Kumasi Sports Stadium, Kumasi

Asante Kotoko won 5-4 on aggregate

1 June 2003

Étoile du Congo (Republic of the Congo)	1 – 2	(Rwanda) APR FC
M. Francgard 27'		Jimmy Gatete 62'; Hassan Milly 72'

Stade Alphonse Massemba-Débat, Brazzaville

APR FC won 5-1 on aggregate

1 June 2003

Wydad AC (Morocco)	4 – 0	(Libya) Al Hilal (Benghazi)
Jean-Jacques Gosso 9'; Mourad Erraji 67', 76'; Khalid Khamma 71'

Stade Mohamed V, Casablanca

Wydad Casablanca won 6-2 on aggregate

1 June 2003

Cercle Olympique de Bamako (Mali)	2 – 0	(Tunisia) Étoile Sportive du Sahel
Daouda Diakité 56'; Jick Diakité 75'

Stade 26 Mars, Bamako

Étoile Sportive du Sahel won 4-2 on aggregate

== Quarterfinals ==
Team 1	Agg.	Team 2	1st leg	2nd leg
Africa Sports (Ivory Coast)	1–3	(Tunisia) Étoile Sportive du Sahel	0–1	1–2
Power Dynamos (Zambia)	2–2 (a)	(Morocco) Wydad AC	2–1	0–1
Asante Kotoko (Ghana)	2–2 (a)	(Rwanda) APR FC	2–1	0–1
Baladeyet El Mahalla (Egypt)	2–4	(Nigeria) Julius Berger	1–1	1–3

=== First leg ===
6 September 2003

Africa Sports (Ivory Coast)	0 – 1	(Tunisia) Étoile Sportive du Sahel
		Zoubeir Baya 70'

Stade Robert Champroux, Abidjan

6 September 2003

Power Dynamos (Zambia)	2 – 1	(Morocco) Wydad AC
Jean Lomami 16', 78'		Mohamed Madihi 88'

Arthur Davies Stadium, Kitwe

7 September 2003

Asante Kotoko (Ghana)	2 – 1	(Rwanda) APR FC
Charles Taylor 81'; Frank Osei 88'		Muhayimana Theones 11'

Kumasi Sports Stadium, Kumasi

7 September 2003

Baladeyet El Mahalla (Egypt)	1 – 1	(Nigeria) Julius Berger
Ayman Mashaly 56' (pen.)		Shaibu Ishola 86'

El Mahalla Stadium, El Mahalla El Kubra

=== Second leg ===
20 September 2003

Julius Berger (Nigeria)	3 – 1	(Egypt) Baladeyet El Mahalla
Peter Ogbuje 40'; Kabir Alausa 53'; Benedict Idahor 86'		Yasser Ali 67'

Gateway Stadium, Abeokuta

Julius Berger won 4-2 on aggregate

20 September 2003

Wydad AC (Morocco)	1 – 0	(Zambia) Power Dynamos
Guillaume Dah Zadi ?'

Stade El Bachir, Mohammédia

Wydad Casablanca 2-2 Power Dynamos on aggregate. Wydad Casablanca won on away goals (1-2)

21 September 2003

Étoile Sportive du Sahel (Tunisia)	2 – 1	(Ivory Coast) Africa Sports
Kais Zouaghi 7'; Mohamed Miladi 53' (pen.)		Amon 15'

Stade Olympique de Sousse, Sousse

Étoile Sportive du Sahel won 3-1 on aggregate

21 September 2003

APR FC (Rwanda)	1 – 0	(Ghana) Asante Kotoko
Olivier Karekezi ?'

Stade Amahoro, Kigali

APR FC 2-2 Asante Kotoko. APR FC won on away goals (1-2)

== Semifinals ==
Team 1	Agg.	Team 2	1st leg	2nd leg
Étoile Sportive du Sahel (Tunisia)	3–0	(Morocco) Wydad AC	2–0	1–0
Julius Berger (Nigeria)	3–2	(Rwanda) APR FC	3–0	0–2

=== First leg ===
4 October 2003

Julius Berger (Nigeria)	3 – 0	(Rwanda) APR FC
Kabiru Alausa 5', 11'; Endurance Idahor 25'

Gateway Stadium, Abeokuta

5 October 2003

Étoile Sportive du Sahel (Tunisia)	2 – 0	(Morocco) Wydad AC
Mohamed Miladi 5' (pen.); Ahmed Hammi 88'

Stade Olympique de Sousse, Sousse

=== Second leg ===
18 October 2003

APR FC (Rwanda)	2 – 0	(Nigeria) Julius Berger
Jimmy Mulisa 15', 48'

Stade Amahoro, Kigali

Julius Berger won 3-2 on aggregate

19 October 2003

Wydad AC (Morocco)	0 – 1	(Tunisia) Étoile Sportive du Sahel
		Ogochukwu Obiakor 79'

Stade Mohamed V, Casablanca

Étoile Sportive du Sahel won 3-0 on aggregate

== Final ==
Team 1	Agg.	Team 2	1st leg	2nd leg
Julius Berger (Nigeria)	2–3	(Tunisia) Étoile Sportive du Sahel	2–0	0–3

=== First leg ===
15 November 2003

Julius Berger (Nigeria)	2 – 0	(Tunisia) Étoile Sportive du Sahel
Ndubuisi Eze 7'; Endurance Idahor 47'

Gateway Stadium, Abeokuta

=== Second leg ===
7 December 2003

Étoile Sportive du Sahel (Tunisia)	3 – 0	(Nigeria) Julius Berger
Ogochukwu Obiakor 2', 60', 87'

Stade Olympique de Sousse, Sousse
Attendance: 28,000

BBC reported first goal as scored by Ibrahima Koné
Étoile Sportive du Sahel won 3-2 on aggregate

== See also ==
- 2003 CAF Champions League
- 2003 CAF Cup
