= 2006 CECAFA Cup =

Tournament details
- Host country: Ethiopia
- Dates: 25 November – 10 December
- Teams: 11 (from 2 sub-confederations)

Final positions
- Champions: Sudan (2nd title)
- Runners-up: Zambia
- Third place: Rwanda
- Fourth place: Uganda

Tournament statistics
- Matches played: 23
- Goals scored: 48 (2.09 per match)
- Top scorer: (Uganda) Geoffrey Sserunkuma (3 goals)

The 2006 Cecafa Senior Challenge Cup, sometimes called the Al Amoudi Senior Challenge Cup due to being sponsored by Ethiopian millionaire Mohammed Hussein Al Amoudi, was the 30th edition of the international football tournament, which involved teams from Southern and Central Africa. The matches were all played in Addis Ababa from 25 November to 10 December. It was competed between the same teams as the previous tournament, except for Eritrea, who did not enter due to their long-running clash with Ethiopia regarding borders, and Kenya, the five-time champions, were serving a ban which was issued on 18 October 2006, which was then an indefinite from international football by the decree of the Fédération Internationale de Football Association ('International Federation of Association Football'), or FIFA; this after Kenya "regularly violated or ignored" "Fifa's statutes, regulations and decisions". Malawi and Zambia joined the tournament after being invited, and competed as guest teams as they were from the federation Council of Southern Africa Football Associations (COSAFA), whereas the rest of the teams were from the Council for East and Central Africa Football Associations (CECAFA). The reasoning behind their invitation was that it would "boost the competitiveness of this year's tournament". The defending champions, Ethiopia, were knocked out in the quarter-finals after coming second in their group, and Sudan claimed their second title despite being beaten by Zambia, as Zambia were guests.

== Background ==
The CECAFA Cup is considered Africa's oldest football tournament, and involves teams from Central and Southern Africa. The matches in the 1973 tournament were played from 22 September 1973 until 29 September 1973. The tournament was originally the Gossage Cup, contested by the four nations of Kenya, Uganda, Tanganyika (modern day Tanzania), and Zanzibar, running from 1929 until 1965. In 1967, this became the East and Central African Senior Challenge Cup, often shortened to simply the Challenge Cup, which was competed for five years, until 1971, before the CECAFA Cup was introduced in 1973. Ethiopia were the defending champions, having won the 2005 tournament in Rwanda, after finishing second in their group, and going on to beat Zanzibar and Rwanda in the final. The 2006 champions Sudan failed, however, to emerge from the 2005 group stages.

== Participants ==
11 teams competed, four teams from the original tournament competed (excluding Tanganyika, which changed names and is currently called Tanzania).

- Burundi
- Djibouti
- Ethiopia
- Malawi
- Rwanda
- Sudan
- Somalia
- Tanzania
- Uganda
- Zambia
- Zanzibar

== Group stages ==
The group stage began on 25 November and ended on 3 December with Group C's final matches between Rwanda against Sudan, and Uganda against Somalia. Groups A and C contained four teams, but as there were only 11 partaking teams, group B contained only the three teams of Burundi, Zambia, and Zanzibar. At the end of the group stage, the team who finished bottom of their group was eliminated, whereas the teams who finished in positions other than last in the group progressed to the knock-out rounds.

If two or more teams are equal on points on completion of the group matches, the following criteria are applied to determine the rankings (in descending order):

1. Number of points obtained in games between the teams involved;
2. Goal difference in games between the teams involved;
3. Goals scored in games between the teams involved;
4. Away goals scored in games between the teams involved;
5. Goal difference in all games;
6. Goals scored in all games;
7. Drawing of lots.

Key to colours in group tables
Teams advanced to the knock out stages
Team eliminated (removed after group stage complete)

=== Group A ===
Team	Pld	W	D	L	GF	GA	GD	Pts
Tanzania	3	3	0	0	7	2	+5	9
Ethiopia	3	2	0	1	6	2	+4	6
Malawi	3	1	0	2	4	3	+1	3
Djibouti	3	0	0	3	0	10	−10	0

25 November 2006

Ethiopia	1–2	Tanzania
Assefa 24'	Report	Maftah 40'; Admin 60'

Addis Ababa Stadium

26 November 2006

Djibouti	0–3	Malawi
	Report	Wadabwa 6'; Mkandawire 52'; Munthali 82'

Addis Ababa Stadium

28 November 2006

Tanzania	2–1	Malawi
Mrwanda 5'; Admin 90+'	Report	Wadabwa 15'

Addis Ababa Stadium

28 November 2006

Ethiopia	4–0	Djibouti
Mebratu 26' (pen.); Tesfaye 46'; Demeke 56' (pen.); Wroku 63'

Addis Ababa Stadium

1 December 2006

Ethiopia	1–0	Malawi
Mebratu 42'

Addis Ababa Stadium

1 December 2006

Tanzania	3–0	Djibouti
Ngassa 8'; Sued 45+'; Tegete 58'

Addis Ababa Stadium

=== Group B ===
Team	Pld	W	D	L	GF	GA	GD	Pts
Burundi	2	1	1	0	3	2	+1	4
Zambia	2	1	0	1	6	3	+3	3
Zanzibar	2	0	1	1	0	4	−4	1

26 November 2006

Burundi	3–2	Zambia
Ndizeye 8'; Nzohabonayo 17'; Ndikumana 46'	Report	Kalaba 67'; Dube Phiri 88'

Addis Ababa Stadium

29 November 2006

Burundi	0–0	Zanzibar

Addis Ababa Stadium

2 December 2006

Zambia	4–0	Zanzibar
Phiri 34', 36'; Katongo 68'; Kalaba 74'

Addis Ababa Stadium

=== Group C ===
Team	Pld	W	D	L	GF	GA	GD	Pts
Uganda	3	3	0	0	5	1	+4	9
Sudan	3	1	1	1	4	2	+2	4
Rwanda	3	1	1	1	3	1	+2	4
Somalia	3	0	0	3	0	8	−8	0

27 November 2006

Somalia	0–3	Rwanda
		Kayihuwa 16'; Ujenza 87'; Nionzima 87'

Addis Ababa Stadium

27 November 2006

Uganda	2–1	Sudan
Sserunkuma 77'; Masaba 87' (pen.)		Ahmed 45'

Addis Ababa Stadium

30 November 2006

Rwanda	0–1	Uganda
		Sserunkuma 60'

Addis Ababa Stadium

30 November 2006

Sudan	3–0	Somalia
Natali 15', 78'; Zakaria 68'

Addis Ababa Stadium

3 December 2006

Rwanda	0–0	Sudan

Addis Ababa Stadium

3 December 2006

Uganda	2–0	Somalia
Wangaluka 11'; Kadogo 17'

Addis Ababa Stadium

== Knock-out stages ==
Quarter-finals
5 December – Addis Ababa
Tanzania	1
Rwanda	2
5 December – Addis Ababa
Ethiopia	0
Zambia	1
6 December – Addis Ababa
Uganda (pen.)	0 (4)
Malawi	0 (2)
6 December – Addis Ababa
Burundi	0
Sudan (a.e.t.)	1

Semi-finals
8 December – Addis Ababa
Rwanda	0
Zambia	1
8 December – Addis Ababa
Uganda	2 (5)
Sudan (pen.)	2 (6)

Final
10 December – Addis Ababa
Zambia (pen.)	0 (11)
Sudan	0 (10)
Third place
10 December – Addis Ababa
Rwanda (pen.)	0 (4)
Uganda	0 (2)

=== Quarter-finals ===
The second quarter-final match, which was held on 6 December between Ethiopia and Zambia, was subject of an emergency meeting between Ugandan chair Dennis Obua, Ethiopian Ashebir W'Giorgis, Sundanian Ahmed Maazal, and the match commissioner who hailed from Zanzibar, Ali Ferej. At the meeting on the same day as the match, it was adjudged that the referee, Rwandan Issa Kagabi, had blown the final whistle to end the game too soon. Zambia stated that they would not partake in any rematch with Ethiopia, and in a similar fashion, the CECAFA secretary general Nicholas Musonye, absent from the meeting, cast aside the idea of a replay and called the makers of the decision "old farts", and delivered the ultimatum that if any replay went ahead, he would cancel the entirety of the tournament. After this, the Ethiopian Football Association did not seek a replay, and left the tournament after their loss.

5 December 2006

Tanzania	1–2	Rwanda
Uzamukunda 26'	Report	Ujenza 41'; Witkenge 55' (pen.)

Addis Ababa Stadium

5 December 2006

Ethiopia	0–1	Zambia
	Report	Sakuwaha 87'

Addis Ababa Stadium

6 December 2006

Uganda	0–0 (a.e.t.)	Malawi
Penalties
Masaba (penalty scored); Wangaluka (penalty scored); Bangoole (penalty missed); Malinga (penalty scored); Sserunkuma (penalty scored)	4–2	(penalty missed) Chavula; (penalty missed) Munthali; (penalty scored) Namwera; (penalty scored) Kafoteka

Addis Ababa Stadium

6 December 2006

Burundi	0–1 (a.e.t.)	Sudan
		Lado 94' (pen.)

Addis Ababa Stadium

=== Semi-finals ===
8 December 2006

Rwanda	0–1	Zambia
		Lwipa 24'

Addis Ababa Stadium

8 December 2006

Uganda	2–2 (a.e.t.)	Sudan
Kayizzi 16'; Sserunkuma 22'		Galag 1'; Yousif 63'
Penalties
	5–6

Addis Ababa Stadium

=== Third place play-off ===
The third place play-off was between Rwanda and Uganda. Rwanda were the 2005 runners up, and in that tournament beat Uganda in the semi-finals, in 2006 they beat Uganda 4–2 on penalties to clinch third-place in the tournament.

10 December 2006

Rwanda	0–0	Uganda
Penalties
	4–2

Addis Ababa Stadium

=== Final ===
The final between Zambia and Sudan finished 0–0 after extra time, but Zambia won on penalties. Although Zambia won the final, the trophy was awarded to Sudan, who Zambia beat in the final. This was as Zambia were only a guest team, from the COSAFA federation, therefore the trophy was awarded to the highest finishing CECAFA federation team: Sudan.

10 December 2006

Zambia	0–0 (a.e.t.)	Sudan
Penalties
	11–10

Addis Ababa Stadium

2006 CECAFA Cup champions

Sudan
2nd title

== Team statistics ==
Teams are ranked using the same tie-breaking criteria as in the group stage, except for the top four teams.

Pos.	Team	Pld	W	D	L	Pts	GF	GA	GD
1	Sudan	6	2	3	1	9	7	4	+3
n/a	Zambia	5	3	1	1	10	8	3	+5
**Third-place play-off**
3	Rwanda	6	2	2	2	8	5	3	+2
4	Uganda	6	3	3	0	12	7	3	+4
**Eliminated in the quarter-finals**
5	Tanzania	4	3	0	1	9	8	4	+4
6	Ethiopia	4	2	0	2	6	6	3	+3
7	Burundi	3	1	1	1	4	3	3	0
8	Malawi	4	1	1	2	4	4	3	+1
**Eliminated in the group stages**
9	Zanzibar	2	0	1	1	1	0	4	−4
10	Somalia	3	0	0	3	0	0	8	−8
11	Djibouti	3	0	0	3	0	0	10	−10
Total		23^{(1)}	17	6^{(2)}	17	63	48	48	0

Updated to games played on 22 December 2006. Team(s) rendered in italics represent(s) the host nation(s). The competition's winning team is rendered in bold.
^{(1)} – Total games lost not counted in total games played (total games lost = total games won)
^{(2)} – Total number of games drawn (tied) for all teams = Total number of games drawn (tied) ÷ 2 (both teams involved)
^{(3)} – As per statistical convention in football, matches decided in extra time are counted as wins and losses, while matches decided by penalty shoot-outs are counted as draws.
