= 2002 CECAFA Cup =

Tournament details
- Host country: Tanzania
- Dates: November 30 – December 14
- Teams: 10 (from 1 sub-confederation)

Final positions
- Champions: Kenya (5th title)
- Runners-up: Tanzania
- Third place: Rwanda
- Fourth place: Uganda

Tournament statistics
- Matches played: 24
- Goals scored: 53 (2.21 per match)
- Top scorer: (Kenya) Dennis Oliech (5 goals)

The 2002 CECAFA Cup was the 26th edition of the tournament. It was held in Tanzania, and was won by Kenya. The matches were played between November 30 and December 14.

== Group stage ==
=== Group A ===
Team	Pts	Pld	W	D	L	GF	GA	GD
Tanzania	8	4	2	2	0	5	2	+3
Kenya	7	4	2	1	0	6	3	+3
Eritrea	5	4	1	2	1	5	7	–2
Sudan	4	4	1	1	2	4	5	–1
Burundi	2	4	0	2	2	3	6	–3

November 30, 2002

Tanzania	1–0	Kenya
Ngoye 9'

CCM Kirumba Stadium, Mwanza

December 1, 2002

Burundi	1–1	Eritrea
Juma 83'		Tesfaye 87'

CCM Kirumba Stadium, Mwanza

December 2, 2002

Tanzania	1 – 1	Sudan
Edward 80'		Kabair 82'

CCM Kirumba Stadium, Mwanza

December 3, 2002

Kenya	1–1	Burundi
Oliech 45'		Abdallah 75' (pen.)

CCM Kirumba Stadium, Mwanza

December 4, 2002

Eritrea	2–1	Sudan
Dedesaye 14', 45'		Agab 85'

CCM Kirumba Stadium, Mwanza

December 5, 2002

Burundi	0–2	Tanzania
		Machupa 4', 36'

CCM Kirumba Stadium, Mwanza

December 6, 2002

Kenya	4–1	Eritrea
Baraza 59', 90'; Oliech 69', 82'		Aregaye 77'

CCM Kirumba Stadium, Mwanza

December 7, 2002

Sudan	2–1	Burundi
Gomal 38'; Bakhit 75'		Msabah 22'

CCM Kirumba Stadium, Mwanza

December 8, 2002

Eritrea	1–1	Tanzania
Fesehaye 45'		Mwakingwe 24'

CCM Kirumba Stadium, Mwanza

December 9, 2002

Sudan	0–1	Kenya
		Oliech 75'

CCM Kirumba Stadium, Mwanza

=== Group B ===
Team	Pts	Pld	W	D	L	GF	GA	GD
Uganda	12	4	4	0	0	9	1	+8
Rwanda	9	4	3	0	1	4	2	+2
Zanzibar	4	4	1	1	2	1	3	–2
Somalia	3	4	1	0	3	1	4	–3
Ethiopia	1	4	0	1	3	0	5	–5

November 30, 2002

Rwanda	1–0	Zanzibar
Gatete 12'

Sheikh Amri Abeid Memorial Stadium, Arusha

December 1, 2002

Somalia	0–2	Uganda
		Sserunkuma 48'; Tabula 53'

Sheikh Amri Abeid Memorial Stadium, Arusha

December 2, 2002

Ethiopia	0–0	Zanzibar

Sheikh Amri Abeid Memorial Stadium, Arusha

December 3, 2002

Somalia	0–1	Rwanda
		Karekezi 53'

Sheikh Amri Abeid Memorial Stadium, Arusha

December 4, 2002

Uganda	3–0	Ethiopia
Alamarew 17' (o.g.); Haweesa 49'; Sserunkuma 52'

Sheikh Amri Abeid Memorial Stadium, Arusha

December 5, 2002

Zanzibar	1–0	Somalia
Ali 39'

Sheikh Amri Abeid Memorial Stadium, Arusha

December 6, 2002

Uganda	2–1	Rwanda
Kinene 3'; Sserunkuma 43'		Kizito 30' (o.g.)

Sheikh Amri Abeid Memorial Stadium, Arusha

December 7, 2002

Ethiopia	0–1	Somalia
		Mohamed 32'

Sheikh Amri Abeid Memorial Stadium, Arusha

December 8, 2002

Zanzibar	0–2	Uganda
		Masaba 29'; Tabula 88'

Sheikh Amri Abeid Memorial Stadium, Arusha

December 9, 2002

Rwanda	1–0	Ethiopia
Nsengiyumva 85'

Sheikh Amri Abeid Memorial Stadium, Arusha

== Knockout stage ==
=== Semi-finals ===
December 11, 2002

Tanzania	3–0	Rwanda
Mtiro 44'; Edward 69'; Machupa 83'

CCM Kirumba Stadium, Mwanza
December 12, 2002

Uganda	1–3	Kenya
Obwin 33'		Mathenge 17'; Oyuga 52'; Mumba 66'

CCM Kirumba Stadium, Mwanza

=== Third place match ===
December 14, 2002

Uganda	1–2	Rwanda
Mulyanga		Sibomana; Baliwuza

CCM Kirumba Stadium, Mwanza

=== Final ===
December 14, 2002

Tanzania	2–3	Kenya
Gabriel 28'; Mexime 59' (pen.)		Oyuga 30'; Baraza 70'; Oliech 72'

CCM Kirumba Stadium, Mwanza
