= 2005 CECAFA Cup =

Tournament details
- Host country: Rwanda
- Dates: November 26 – December 10
- Teams: 10 (from 1 sub-confederation)

Final positions
- Champions: Ethiopia (4th title)
- Runners-up: Rwanda
- Third place: Zanzibar
- Fourth place: Uganda

Tournament statistics
- Matches played: 24
- Goals scored: 73 (3.04 per match)

The 2005 CECAFA Cup was the 29th edition of the tournament. It was held in Rwanda, and was won by Ethiopia. The matches were played between November 26 to December 10. All matches were played in Stade Amahoro in Kigali.

Kenya was disqualified for failure to pay fees to CECAFA.

== Group stage ==
=== Group A ===
| Team | Pts | Pld | W | D | L | GF | GA | GD |
|---|---|---|---|---|---|---|---|---|
| Zanzibar | 10 | 4 | 3 | 1 | 0 | 7 | 2 | +5 |
| Rwanda | 9 | 4 | 3 | 0 | 1 | 8 | 4 | +4 |
| Tanzania | 7 | 4 | 2 | 1 | 1 | 5 | 5 | 0 |
| Burundi | 1 | 4 | 0 | 1 | 3 | 2 | 6 | –4 |
| Eritrea | 1 | 4 | 0 | 1 | 3 | 2 | 7 | –5 |

November 26, 2005

| Rwanda | 0–1 | Zanzibar |
|---|---|---|
| | | Joseph 12' |

November 28, 2005

| Eritrea | 0–3 | Zanzibar |

November 28, 2005

| Burundi | 1–2 | Tanzania |

November 30, 2005

| Burundi | 1–2 | Zanzibar |
|---|---|---|
| Ndahimana 61' | | Juma 17'; Ussi 72' |

November 30, 2005

| Eritrea | 2–3 | Rwanda |
|---|---|---|
| Mahmoud | | Gatete; Lomani |

December 2, 2005

| Tanzania | 1–1 | Zanzibar |

December 2, 2005

| Burundi | 0–0 | Eritrea |

December 4, 2005

| Eritrea | 0–1 | Tanzania |
|---|---|---|
| | | Bakari 38' |

December 4, 2005

| Burundi | 0–2 | Rwanda |

December 6, 2005

| Rwanda | 3–1 | Tanzania |
|---|---|---|
| Lomani; Gatete | | Kesshy |

=== Group B ===
| Team | Pts | Pld | W | D | L | GF | GA | GD |
|---|---|---|---|---|---|---|---|---|
| Uganda | 10 | 4 | 3 | 1 | 0 | 16 | 1 | +15 |
| Ethiopia | 10 | 4 | 3 | 1 | 0 | 12 | 2 | +10 |
| Sudan | 6 | 4 | 2 | 0 | 2 | 7 | 12 | –5 |
| Somalia | 3 | 4 | 1 | 0 | 3 | 6 | 10 | –4 |
| Djibouti | 1 | 4 | 0 | 0 | 4 | 2 | 18 | –16 |

November 27, 2005

| Djibouti | 1–2 | Somalia |
|---|---|---|
| Okishi | | Mohamed; Sharki |

November 27, 2005

| Ethiopia | 0–0 | Uganda |

November 29, 2005

| Somalia | 1–4 | Sudan |
|---|---|---|
| Mohamed | | Galag; Agab; Tambal |

November 30, 2005

| Djibouti | 1–6 | Uganda |
|---|---|---|
| ? | | Nsereko; Masaba 12' (pen.); Sserunkuma; Mawejje; Muganga |

December 1, 2005

| Ethiopia | 3–1 | Sudan |
|---|---|---|
| Shegere | | Galag |

December 1, 2005

| Somalia | 0–7 | Uganda |
|---|---|---|
| | | Massa; Nsereko; Mubiru; Kayuzi; Byekwaso |

December 3, 2005

| Djibouti | 0–6 | Ethiopia |
|---|---|---|
| | | Mebratu 12'; Shegere 40'; Atten; Sesela 68'; Pegpathen 86'; Pirman 87' |

December 3, 2005

| Sudan | 0–3 | Uganda |
|---|---|---|
| | | Massa 16'; Sserunkuma; Mubiru |

December 5, 2005

| Ethiopia | 3–1 | Somalia |

December 5, 2005

| Djibouti | 0–4 | Sudan |
|---|---|---|
| | | Tambal; Agab; Yousif; Jebril |

== Knockout stage ==
=== Semi-finals ===
December 8, 2005

| Zanzibar | 0–4 | Ethiopia |
|---|---|---|
| | | Ashenafi 14'; Lemessa 46', 48', 82' |

December 8, 2005

| Uganda | 0–1 (a.e.t.) | Rwanda |
|---|---|---|
| | | Olivier Karekezi 115' |

=== Third place match ===
December 10, 2005

| Zanzibar | 0–0 (a.e.t.) | Uganda |
Penalties
| | 5–4 |

=== Final ===
December 10, 2005

| Ethiopia | 1–0 | Rwanda |
|---|---|---|
| Andualem Negusse 59' (red card) 88' |
