= Hakizimana =

Hakizimana is a surname. Notable people with the surname include:

- Gervais Hakizimana (1987–2024), Rwandan athlete and coach
- Hassan Hakizimana (born 1990), Burundian former footballer
- Issa Hakizimana (born 1994), Burundian footballer
- Jean Hakizimana (born 1985), Burundian footballer
- John Hakizimana (born 1996), Rwandan long-distance runner
- Muhadjiri Hakizimana (born 1994), Rwandan footballer
- Parfait Hakizimana (born 1988), Burundian parataekwondo practitioner
