= Yasir Ali =

Yasir Ali may refer to:

- Yasir Ali (Pakistani cricketer) (born 1985), Pakistani cricketer
- Yasir Ali (Bangladeshi cricketer) (born 1996), Bangladeshi cricketer
- Yasir Ali Butt, squash player
- Yasser Ali, Egyptian spokesperson
- Yaser Ali Al-Gabr, Yemeni footballer
