= Alausa (surname) =

Alausa is a surname. Notable people with the surname include:

- Kabiru Alausa (born 1983), Nigerian footballer
- Tunji Alausa, Nigerian medical doctor
