= Bader Eldin Galag =

Sudanese footballer

Personal information
- Full name: Badr El-Din El Doud Abdalla
- Date of birth: April 1, 1981 (age 45)
- Place of birth: Port Sudan, Red Sea State, Sudan
- Height: 1.79 m (5 ft 10 in)
- Position: Midfielder

Team information
- Current team: Al Ahli SC (Khartoum)
- Number: 12

Senior career*
Years	Team	Apps	(Gls)
1998–1999	Al-Hurya SC (Omdurman)	0	(0)
2000–2001	Beit Al Mal SC (Omdurman)	0	(0)
2002–2004	Hilal Alsahil SC	0	(0)
2005–2012	Al-Merrikh SC	0	(0)
2012	Hilal Alsahil SC (loan)	0	(0)
2013	Al-Ahli Club (Atbara)	0	(0)
2014–2025	Al Khartoum SC	0	(0)
2025-	Al Ahli SC (Khartoum)	0	(0)

International career^{‡}
2002–2012	Sudan	81	(8)
Medal record
Men's football
Representing Sudan
African Nations Championship
Third place	2011 Sudan
CECAFA Cup
Winner	2006 Ethiopia
Third place	2004 Ethiopia
- * Club domestic league appearances and goals as of January 16, 2025 ‡ National team caps and goals as of June 24, 2024

Badr El-Din El Doud Abdalla (Arabic: بدرالدين عبدالله قلق), known as Bader Eldin Galag, is a Sudanese football midfielder currently playing for Al-Merriekh. Galag is also appearing in Al-Hilal portsudan and in the Sudan national team as right winger. He is a member of the Sudan national football team.

== International goals ==
#	Date	Venue	Opponent	Score	Result	Competition
1.	21 June 2003	Lusaka, Zambia	Zambia	1-1	Draw	2004 African Cup of Nations qualification
2.3	29 November 2005	Kigali, Rwanda	Somalia	4-1	Won	2005 CECAFA Cup
4.	1 December 2005	Kigali, Rwanda	Ethiopia	3-1	Lost	2005 CECAFA Cup
5.	3 September 2006	Khartoum, Sudan	Seychelles	3-0	Won	2008 Africa Cup of Nations qualification
6.	8 December 2006	Addis Ababa, Ethiopia	Uganda	2-2	Draw	2006 CECAFA Cup
7.	5 June 2011	Lobamba, Swaziland	Swaziland	2-1	Won	2012 Africa Cup of Nations qualification
8.	19 August 2011	Asmara, Eritrea	Eritrea	3-0	Won	Friendly

== Honours ==
Sudan

- African Nations Championship: 3rd place, 2011
- CECAFA Cup: 2006; 3rd place 2004
