= Ala'a Eldin Yousif =

Sudanese footballer

Personal information
- Full name: Ala'a Eldin Yousif Hado
- Date of birth: January 3, 1982 (age 44)
- Place of birth: Bahri, Khartoum State, Sudan
- Height: 1.80 m (5 ft 11 in)
- Position: Defensive midfielder

Senior career*
Years	Team	Apps	(Gls)
2000–2001	Al-Shaabeia SC (Bahri)	0	(0)
2001–2002	Al-Hilal SC (Kassala)	0	(0)
2003–2006	Al-Merrikh SC	0	(0)
2007–2012	Al-Hilal Club	0	(0)
2013–2017	Al-Merrikh SC	0	(0)
2018	Hay Al-Wadi SC (Nyala)	0	(0)
2018–2020	Kober SC (Bahri)	0	(0)
2020-2023	Al Ahli Club (Merowe)	0	(0)
2023-2025	Al-Hilal SC (Al-Managel)		
2025-2026	Al Ahli SC (Khartoum)		

International career
2003–2014	Sudan	62	(5)

Managerial career
- 2026: Al Ahli SC (Khartoum)
- 2026-: Al-Merrikh SC (Al-Hasahisa)
Medal record
Men's football
Representing Sudan
African Nations Championship
Third place	2011 Sudan
CECAFA Cup
Winner	2006 Ethiopia
Third place	2004 Ethiopia
- * Club domestic league appearances and goals

Ala'a Eldin Yousif (born January 3, 1982) is a Sudanese footballer who currently plays for the Sudanese club Al-Merrikh SC in the Sudanese Premier League.

He is a member of the Sudan National Football Team. He captained the national team in the last four tiers of the African zone finals qualifiers. He was brought from Al-Merrikh SC in December 2004 to the bitter rivals Al-Hilal. After playing for 7 years with Al-Hilal, he returned to Al Merrikh in July 2012.

== International career ==
=== International goals ===
Scores and results list Sudan's goal tally first.

No	Date	Venue	Opponent	Score	Result	Competition
1.	5 December 2005	Amahoro Stadium, Kigali, Rwanda	Djibouti	?–0	4–0	2005 CECAFA Cup
2.	8 December 2006	Addis Ababa Stadium, Addis Ababa, Ethiopia	Uganda	2–1	2–1 (6–5 p)	2006 CECAFA Cup
3.	14 June 2008	Khartoum Stadium, Khartoum, Sudan	Mali	1–0	3–2	2010 FIFA World Cup qualification
4.	16 January 2011	Gehaz El Reyada Stadium, Cairo, Egypt	Tanzania	2–0	2–0	2011 Nile Basin Tournament
5.	5 June 2011	Somhlolo National Stadium, Lobamba, Swaziland	Swaziland	2–1	2–1	2012 Africa Cup of Nations qualification

== Honours ==
Sudan

- African Nations Championship: 3rd place, 2011
- CECAFA Cup: 2006; 3rd place 2004
