= Zuberi Katwila =

Tanzanian footballer

Personal information
- Date of birth: 11 October 1982 (age 44)
- Position: Midfielder

Senior career*
Years	Team	Apps	(Gls)
1999–2013	Mtibwa Sugar		

International career^{‡}
1997–2002	Tanzania	5	(0)
- * Club domestic league appearances and goals as of 25 April 2021 ‡ National team caps and goals as of 25 April 2021

Zuberi Katwila (born 11 October 1982) is a Tanzanian football midfielder who played for Mtibwa Sugar. He was a squad member for the 1997 COSAFA Cup and the 2002 CECAFA Cup.
