= Daouda Diakité =

Daouda Diakité can refer to:

- Daouda Diakité (Burkinabé footballer)
- Daouda Diakité (Malian footballer)
