= 2011 Nile Basin Tournament =

Tournament details
- Host country: Egypt
- Cities: Cairo, Ismaillia
- Dates: 5–17 January
- Teams: 7
- Venues: 4 (in 2 host cities)

Final positions
- Champions: Egypt
- Runners-up: Uganda
- Third place: DR Congo
- Fourth place: Kenya

Tournament statistics
- Matches played: 14
- Goals scored: 37 (2.64 per match)
- Top scorer: (Egypt) Al-Sayed Hamdy (6 Goals)
- Best player: (Egypt) Ahmed Samir Farag

The 2011 Nile Basin Tournament was an association football tournament organized by the Egyptian Football Association. The tournament was contested in January 2011.

All fixtures are listed on FIFA.com with a 'Friendly' weight status which means that results will affect the participating nations' FIFA World Rankings.

== Participants ==
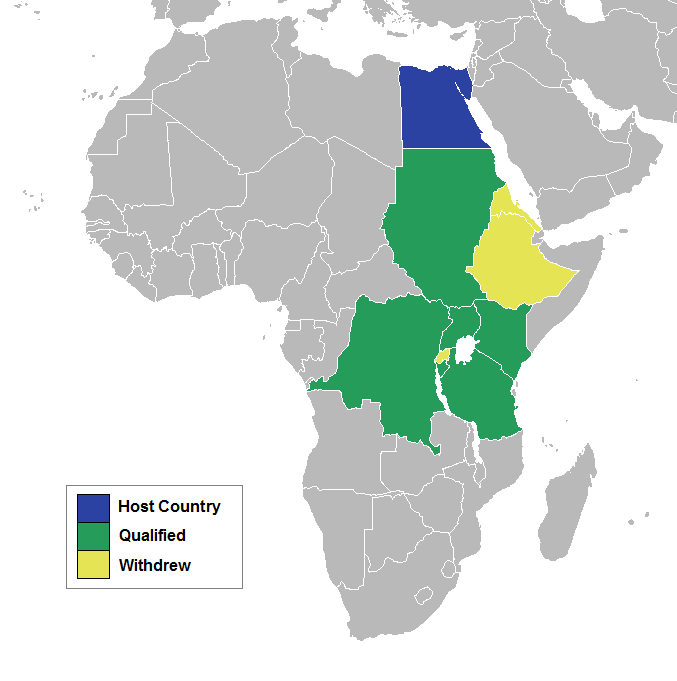
A map of Africa showing the qualified nations.

- Egypt (host)
- Burundi (withdrew)
- DR Congo
- Kenya
- Sudan
- Tanzania
- Uganda
- Eritrea (withdrew)
- Ethiopia (withdrew)
- Rwanda

Sudan requested not to be drawn with Uganda as they have been drawn against each other in the 2011 African Nations Championship.

== Matches ==
Teams finishing in 1st and 2nd position will qualify for semi-final stage whilst team that finishes in 3rd position will qualify for 5th place play-off.

=== Group stage ===
Key to colours in group tables
Group winners and runners-up advance to the semi-finals
Groups third advance to the fifth-place match

==== Tie-breaking criteria ====
If two or more teams end the group stage with the same number of points, their ranking is determined by the following criteria:

1. points earned in the matches between the teams concerned;
2. goal difference in the matches between the teams concerned;
3. number of goals scored in the matches between the teams concerned;
4. goal difference in all group matches;
5. number of goals scored in all group matches;
6. fair play points system taking into account the number of yellow and red cards;
7. drawing of lots by the organising committee.

==== Group A ====
Team	Pld	W	D	L	GF	GA	GD	Pts
Egypt	3	3	0	0	9	1	+8	9
Uganda	3	1	1	1	4	3	+1	4
Tanzania	3	0	2	1	3	7	−4	2
Burundi	3	0	1	2	2	7	−5	1

All times are Egypt Standard Time is at UTC+2.

5 January 2011
16:45

Uganda	3 – 1	Burundi
Kaweesa 34'; Ssemakula 55'; Kasule 89'	report	Habarugira 38'

Police Academy Stadium, Cairo
Referee: Mahmoud Ashour (Egypt)

5 January 2011
19:15

Egypt	5 – 1	Tanzania
Hamdy 5', 57'; Aboutrika 12'; Haroub 24' (o.g.); Ali 78'	report	Gumbo 82'

Osman Ahmed Osman Stadium, Cairo
Referee: Mohamed Hussein El Fadil (Sudan)

8 January 2011
17:00

Tanzania	1 – 1	Burundi
Shadrack Nsajigwa 75' (pen.)	report	Tambwe Hamisi 50'

Police Academy Stadium, Cairo
Referee: Ojwang Osano (Kenya)

8 January 2011
19:15

Egypt	1 – 0	Uganda
Gedo 90+3'	report

Osman Ahmed Osman Stadium, Cairo
Referee: Musungayi Mpunga (Congo DR)

11 January 2011
14:45

Uganda	1 – 1	Tanzania
Y. Mugalu 65'	report	A. Machupa 24'

Police Academy Stadium, Cairo
Referee: Mohamed Hussein El Fadil (Sudan)

11 January 2011
19:15

Egypt	3 – 0	Burundi
Gedo 2'; Ali 11'; Hamdy 80'	report

Ismailia Stadium, Ismailia
Referee: Ojwang Osano (Kenya)

==== Group B ====
Team	Pld	W	D	L	GF	GA	GD	Pts
DR Congo	2	2	0	0	3	1	+2	6
Kenya	2	1	0	1	1	1	0	3
Sudan	2	0	0	2	1	3	−2	0

5 January 2011
14:45

Kenya	1 – 0	Sudan
Collins Okoth 17' (pen.)	report

Osman Ahmed Osman Stadium, Cairo
Referee: Onesimo Ndayisenga (Burundi)

8 January 2011
14:45

DR Congo	1 – 0	Kenya
Lofo Bongeli 27' (pen.)	report

Police Academy Stadium, Cairo
Referee: Denis Batte (Uganda)

11 January 2011
16:45

Sudan	1 – 2	DR Congo
Muhannad Tahir 71'	report	Matondo Salakiaku 36'; Lofo Bongeli 90' (pen.)

Osman Ahmed Osman Stadium, Cairo
Referee: Orden Mbaga (Tanzania)

== Knockout stage ==
Semi-finals
14 January 2011 - Cairo
Egypt	5
Kenya	1
14 January 2011 - Cairo
DR Congo	0
Uganda	1

Final
17 January 2011 - Cairo
Egypt	3
Uganda	1
Third place
17 January 2011 - Cairo
DR Congo	1
Kenya	0

=== Semi-final ===
14 January 2011
16:00

DR Congo	0 - 1	Uganda
	report	Habeb Kofoma 23'

Petro Sport Stadium, Cairo
Referee: Mahmoud Ashour (Egypt)

14 January 2011
19:20

Egypt	5 - 1	Kenya
Ahmad Belal 13', 69', 90'; Hamdy 21'; Gomaa 25'	report	Omondi 67'

Petro Sport Stadium, Cairo
Referee: Onesimo Ndayisenga (Burundi)

=== 5th Place Playoff ===
16 January 2011
14:00

Tanzania	0 - 2	Sudan
	report	Haitham Mustafa 52'; Ala'a Eldin Yousif 61'

Police Academy Stadium, Cairo
Referee: Denis Batte (Uganda)

=== 3rd Place Playoff ===
17 January 2011
14:49

DR Congo	1 - 0	Kenya
Kasongo 31'	report

Osman Ahmed Osman Stadium, Cairo
Referee: Mohamed Hussein El Fadil (Sudan)

=== Final ===
17 January 2011
18:28

Egypt	3 - 1	Uganda
Hamdy 38', 70'; Gedo 81'	report	Ceaser Okhuti 84' (pen.)

Military Academy Stadium, Cairo
Referee: Musungayi Mpunga (Congo DR)

== Winner ==
Nile Basin Tournament
2011 winner

Egypt
First title

2nd Place	3rd Place
Uganda	DR Congo

4th Place	5th Place	6th Place	7th Place
Kenya	Sudan	Tanzania	Burundi

== Prize money ==
Final position	Money awarded to team
1	$150,000
2	$120,000
3	$100,000
4	$60,000
5	$50,000
6	$50,000
7	$50,000

== Awards ==
- Best player: (Egypt) Ahmed Samir Farag
- Top scorer: (Egypt) Al-Sayed Hamdy
- Best Goalkeeper: (Democratic Republic of the Congo) Muteba Kidiaba
- Fair Play:DR Congo

== Scorers ==
6 goals

- (Egypt) Al-Sayed Hamdy

3 goals

- (Egypt) Ahmad Belal
- (Egypt) Geddo

2 goals

- (Democratic Republic of the Congo) Lofo Bongeli
- (Egypt) Ahmed Ali

1 goal

- (Burundi) Habarugira
- (Burundi) Tambwe Hamisi
- (Democratic Republic of the Congo) Kasongo
- (Democratic Republic of the Congo) Matondo Salakiaku
- (Egypt) Aboutrika
- (Egypt) Gomaa
- (Kenya) Okoth
- (Kenya) Kevin Omondi
- (Sudan) Ala'a Eldin Yousif
- (Sudan) Haitham Mustafa
- (Sudan) Muhannad Tahir

1 goal

- (Tanzania) A. Machupa
- (Tanzania) Gumbo
- (Tanzania) Shadrack Nsajigwa
- (Uganda) Kasule
- (Uganda) Kaweesa
- (Uganda) Kofoma
- (Uganda) Manoya
- (Uganda) Ssemakula
- (Uganda) Y. Mugalu

Own goal

- (Tanzania) Haroub

== Media Coverage ==
- Nile Sport
- Modern Sport
