= Peter Wadabwa =

Malawian footballer

Personal information
- Full name: Peter Wadabwa
- Date of birth: 14 September 1983 (age 43)
- Place of birth: Blantyre, Malawi
- Positions: Striker; winger

Team information
- Current team: Be Forward Wanderers
- Number: 23

Youth career
- Silver Strikers

Senior career*
| Years | Team | Apps | (Gls) |
| 2005–2006 | Silver Strikers | | |
| 2006–2007 | Jomo Cosmos | | |
| 2007–2009 | Super ESCOM | | |
| 2009–2013 | Thanda Royal Zulu | | |
| 2013– | Golden Arrows | 6 | (1) |

International career^{‡}
| 2005–2016 | Malawi | 45 | (7) |
- * Club domestic league appearances and goals as of 5 November 2013 ‡ National team caps and goals as of 22 February 2018

Peter Wadabwa (born 14 September 1983) is a Malawian footballer who currently plays for Be Forward Wanderers

== International career ==
Wadabwa is part of the Malawi national football team and represented his country at 2010 African Cup of Nations.

=== International goals ===
Scores and results list Malawi's goal tally first.

| No | Date | Venue | Opponent | Score | Result | Competition |
|---|---|---|---|---|---|---|
| 1. | 25 June 2006 | Estádio 1º de Maio, Maputo, Mozambique | Mozambique | ?–? | 2–1 | Friendly |
| 2. | 6 July 2006 | Civo Stadium, Lilongwe, Malawi | Botswana | 1–1 | 2–1 | Friendly |
| 3. | 26 November 2006 | Addis Ababa Stadium, Addis Ababa, Ethiopia | Djibouti | 1–0 | 3–0 | 2006 CECAFA Cup |
| 4. | 28 November 2006 | Addis Ababa Stadium, Addis Ababa, Ethiopia | Tanzania | 1–1 | 1–2 | 2006 CECAFA Cup |
| 5. | 22 January 2014 | Kamuzu Stadium, Blantyre, Malawi | Swaziland | 2–0 | 3–1 | Friendly |
| 6. | 22 January 2014 | Kamuzu Stadium, Blantyre, Malawi | Swaziland | 3–1 | 3–1 | Friendly |
| 7. | 9 February 2011 | Sam Nujoma Stadium, Windhoek, Namibia | Rwanda | 1–1 | 2–1 | Friendly |
