= Rodson Dedy Tojosoa =

Malagasy footballer

Personal information
- Full name: Rodson Joseph Dedy Tojosoa
- Date of birth: 7 January 1974 (age 52)
- Place of birth: Madagascar
- Position: Midfielder

Senior career*
Years	Team	Apps	(Gls)
199x–2003	AS Fortior		
2004–2010	Curepipe Starlight SC		

International career
2003–2005	Madagascar	2	(0)
- * Club domestic league appearances and goals

Rodson Dedy Tojosoa (born 7 January 1974) is a Madagascar international footballer.

== Career ==
Rodson Dedy Tojosoa was played for the AS Fortior and Curepipe Starlight SC.

== Honours ==
- Mauritian League: 3

2007, 2008, 2009

- Mauritian Cup: 2

2006, 2008.

- Mauritian Republic Cup: 2

2007, 2008.
