= Geoffrey Sserunkuma =

Ugandan footballer (born 1983)

Geoff Sserunkuma
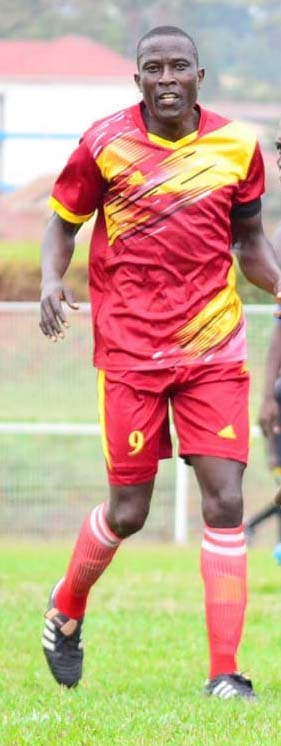
- Geoffrey Sserunkuma 2022, by Samson Ssemakadde

Personal information
- Date of birth: 7 June 1983 (age 43)
- Place of birth: Kampala, Uganda
- Height: 1.80 m (5 ft 11 in)
- Position: Striker

Team information
- Current team: Wakiso Giants FC
- Number: 24

Youth career
- –2002: Police Jinja

Senior career*
Years	Team	Apps	(Gls)
2002–2003	Police Jinja	?	(?)
2004–2006	Kampala City Council FC	?	(?)
2007	Saint-George SA	?	(?)
2007–2008	Nalubaale	?	(?)
2008–2009	Bloemfontein Celtic	20	(7)
2009–2010	Kampala City Council	?	(?)
2010–2011	Bidvest Wits	8	(1)
2011–2012	Vasco da Gama	?	(?)
2013–2014	SC Victoria University	?	(?)
2015–2016	Lweza F.C	24	(8)
2016–2017	Kampala City Council	42	(31)
2017–2018	Buildcon F.C	14	(8)
2018–2019	NAPSA Stars FC	7	(1)
2019-	Wakiso Giants FC		

International career^{‡}
2002–	Uganda	47	(15)
- * Club domestic league appearances and goals ‡ National team caps and goals as of 12 June 2017

Geoffrey Sserunkuma (born 7 June 1983) is a Ugandan international footballer who of recent played for Wakiso Giants FC and the Uganda national team (the "Cranes") as a striker.

== Club career ==
Operating as striker, Sserukuma played for Police Jinja. He enjoyed success at Kampala City Council FC before a transfer to Ethiopian Premier League club Saint-George SA in July 2007. In summer 2008, he left the club Addis Ababa and moved to Bloemfontein Celtic. In July 2009, he left Bloemfontein Celtic and completed a move to Vasco Da Gama, after falling out with Celtic manager Owen da Gama.

=== Bidvest Wits ===
On 6 April 2010, Sserunkuma signed for Bidvest Wits agreeing a two-year deal with the club.

=== Vasco Da Gama ===
However, he returned to Vasco Da Gama the following season, playing in the second-tier following the club's relegation from the top flight.

=== Lweza Football Club ===
In 2015, Sserunkuma joined Lweza FC. Sserunkuma played for a season at the Lweza F.C and scored eight goals in that season.

=== Kampala City Council ===
In July 2016, Sserunkuma joined Kampala City Council FC from Lweza Football Club; this was the second stint for Sserunkuma at the Lugogo based club following his first era during 2004 and 2006 seasons. Sserunkuma opened his goal account with a debut strike against JMC Hippos on Friday 22 August 2016 as the Kampala City Council FC edged their visitors 2-1 at Phillip Omondi Stadium, Lugogo. While in 2016/2017 season, Sserunkuma was the first player to hit double figures that season, His goal in the third minute against BUL FC was his 10th goal of the season. He last featured for Kampala City Council when it was playing against Paidha Black Angels FC in Uganda Cup 2017 finals in Arua where he scored his last goal. Sserunkuma scored 31 goals in all competitions for KCCA FC last season and helped the team win their first ever domestic double.

=== Buildcon F.C ===
In July 2017, Sserunkuma joined Buildcon F.C. On 12 August, Sserunkuma scored his first goal for Buildcon F.C against Lusaka Dynamos in a league match played at Levy Mwanawasa Stadium.

=== NAPSA Stars ===
He played for NAPSA Stars F.C. FC for a season.

=== Wakiso Giants FC ===
On 7 August 2019, Sserunkuma joined Wakiso Giants FC.

== International career ==
He first began playing for the Cranes in the year 2002. He was part of the Uganda Cranes team that participated in the 2016 Championship of Africa Nations tournament in Rwanda and scored against Zimbabwe in their 1-1 draw. Sserunkuma was one of the six locally based players in the Cranes squad which represented Uganda in 2017 Africa Cup of Nations at Gabon.

== International statistics ==
As of match played 7 October 2017

Uganda
Year	Apps	Goals
2002	5	1
2004	2	0
2005	6	3
2006	10	5
2007	4	0
2008	2	0
2009	1	1
2010	2	0
2011	4	0
2012	1	0
2016	4	1
2017	7	1
Total	48	13

=== International goals ===
Scores and results list Uganda's goal tally first.

No	Date	Venue	Opponent	Score	Result	Competition
1.	1 December 2002	Sheikh Amri Abeid Memorial Stadium, Arusha, Tanzania	Somalia	1–0	2–0	2002 CECAFA Cup
2.	4 December 2002	Sheikh Amri Abeid Memorial Stadium, Arusha, Tanzania	Ethiopia	3–0	3–0	2002 CECAFA Cup
3.	6 December 2002	Sheikh Amri Abeid Memorial Stadium, Arusha, Tanzania	Rwanda	2–1	2–1	2002 CECAFA Cup
4.	18 June 2005	Mandela National Stadium, Kampala, Uganda	Cape Verde	1–0	1–0	2006 FIFA World Cup qualification
5.	8 October 2005	Mandela National Stadium, Kampala, Uganda	Burkina Faso	2–1	2–2	2006 FIFA World Cup qualification
6.	30 November 2005	Amahoro Stadium, Kigali, Rwanda	Djibouti	4–0	6–1	2005 CECAFA Cup
7.	3 December 2005	Amahoro Stadium, Kigali, Rwanda	Sudan	2–0	3–0	2005 CECAFA Cup
8.	16 August 2006	Zaawia Stadium, Zawiya, Libya	Libya	2–1	2–3	Friendly
9.	27 November 2006	Addis Ababa Stadium, Addis Ababa, Ethiopia	Sudan	1–1	2–1	2006 CECAFA Cup
10.	30 November 2006	Addis Ababa Stadium, Addis Ababa, Ethiopia	Rwanda	1–0	1–0	2006 CECAFA Cup
11.	8 December 2006	Addis Ababa Stadium, Addis Ababa, Ethiopia	Sudan	2–1	2–2 (5–6 p)	2005 CECAFA Cup
12.	31 May 2009	Tamale Stadium, Tamale, Ghana	Ghana	1–2	1–2	Friendly
13.	4 September 2010	Mandela National Stadium, Kampala, Uganda	Angola	3–0	3–0	2012 Africa Cup of Nations qualification
14.	27 January 2016	Umuganda Stadium, Gisenyi, Rwanda	Zimbabwe	1–1	1–1	2016 African Nations Championship
15.	11 June 2017	Estádio Nacional de Cabo Verde, Praia, Cape Verde	Cape Verde	1–0	1–0	2019 Africa Cup of Nations qualification

== Honors and achievements ==
=== Club ===
Kampala Capital City Authority FC

- Ugandan Super League: 2017
- Uganda Cup: 2017

=== Individual ===
- Uganda Super League top scorer (1): 2016-2017
- Uganda Super League MVP : 2016-2017
- Uganda Super League FANS` PLAYER OF THE YEAR : 2016-2017
- Kawowo sports Best XI of the 2016-17 Uganda Premier League:
- Most Valuable Player : 2017
- Player of the year : 2017
- Fans player of the year : 2017
