= Mike Mururi =

Kenyan football manager (born 1975)

Personal information
- Full name: Mike Mururi
- Date of birth: 22 August 1975 (age 51)
- Height: 1.72 m (5 ft 8 in)

International career
Years	Team	Apps	(Gls)
1996–2007	Kenya	26	(3)

Managerial career
- 2024–: Nzoia Sugar

Mike Mururi is a former Kenyan international and current coach at immediate former Kenyan Premier League side Nzoia Sugar.

Mururi previously coached Chemelil Sugar,Sofapaka, Kakamega Homeboyz,Mulembe, amongst other clubs.

== Career statistics ==
=== International ===
Appearances and goals by national team and year
National team	Year	Apps	Goals
Kenya	1996	1	0
Kenya	1997	11	1
Kenya	1998	1	0
Kenya	1999	4	0
Kenya	2000	4	0
Kenya	2001	–	
Kenya	2002	–	
Kenya	2003	–	
Kenya	2004	4	2
Kenya	2005	–	
Kenya	2006	–	
Kenya	2007	1	0
Total		26	3

Scores and results list Kenya's goal tally first, score column indicates score after each Mururi goal.

List of international goals scored by Mike Mururi
No.	Date	Venue	Opponent	Score	Result	Competition
1	25 January 1997	Moi International Sports Centre, Nairobi, Kenya	Gabon	1–0	1–0	1998 Africa Cup of Nations qualification
2	18 December 2004	Addis Ababa Stadium, Addis Ababa, Ethiopia	Uganda	1–0	1–1	2004 CECAFA Cup
3	22 December 2004	Addis Ababa Stadium, Addis Ababa, Ethiopia	Ethiopia	1–2	2–2 (a.e.t.) (4–5 p)	2004 CECAFA Cup
