= Dennis Oliech =

Kenyan footballer (born 1985)

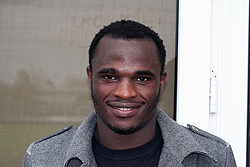

Personal information
- Full name: Dennis Oguta Oliech
- Date of birth: 2 February 1985 (age 41)
- Place of birth: Mathare, Nairobi, Kenya
- Height: 1.81 m (5 ft 11 in)
- Position: Striker

Youth career
- 1998 - 2002: Mathare United

Senior career*
Years	Team	Apps	(Gls)
2002–2003	Mathare United		(14)
2003–2005	Al-Arabi	47	(27)
2006–2007	Nantes	32	(4)
2007–2012	Auxerre	165	(25)
2013–2015	Ajaccio	50	(8)
2015	Dubai CSC	10	(4)
2019	Gor Mahia	19	(5)

International career
2002–2016	Kenya	76	(34)
- * Club domestic league appearances and goals

Dennis Oguta Oliech (Kenyan English: [ˈdenis oˈgutɑ oliˈetʃ]; born 2 February 1985) is a Kenyan former professional footballer who played as a striker. As a member of the Kenya national team, he became his nation's second all-time goalscorer, behind William "Chege" Ouma (35 goals), with 34 goals before retiring from international football in 2016.

== Club career ==
=== Early career ===
Oliech started playing football for Dagoretti Santos in his earlier years, then Mathare United. While in his youth career, Oliech went on trial with Ligue 1 side Marseille, but Mathare United chairman Bob Munro blocked the move from happening.

During Oliech's career with Al-Arabi in Qatar, Oliech was playing under a different middle-east name. At one point he said he even forgot the name and had to be reminded that it was his name.

Oliech turned professional in 2003 playing for Al-Arabi in Qatar until late 2005. In 2004, he was offered a chance to change his citizenship from Kenyan to Qatari. But he refused the offer. At age nineteen, Oliech was named by The Guardian newspaper as one of the world's most promising young players in a list which included future stars such as Wayne Rooney and Robin Van Persie. While at Qatar, Oliech played alongside Stefan Effenberg and Gabriel Batistuta during their time at Qatar. He quoted "Batistuta told me, 'Oliech just run and fall in the box and leave the penalty for me'." In 2005, Al-Arabi turned down a Sh100m offer from Monaco to sign Oliech. During the same year, Al-Arabi was told to pay US$15,000 compensation to his youth club by the Fifa's Dispute Resolution Chamber (DRC), as the move to sign Oliech. His goalscoring form is well known for goal poacher.

=== Nantes ===
In 2005, Oliech signed a four-year contract with the French Ligue 1 team Nantes, with a fee of $3.7 million (KSh.281.2 million/=). Upon the move in January, Oliech was given a number nine shirt. However, his youth club Mathare United claims Nantes owed them Sh14m, but the claims were dismissed.

Shortly after signing for Nantes, Oliech hadn't made a great start in France after a knee operation. Then, thirty days later, he was given all-clear by the doctors and returned to training. He made his debut, on 11 March 2006, when he came on for Julio Hernán Rossi, in the 66th minute, as Nante drew 1–1 with Lille. Three weeks later, on 1 April 2006, Oliech scored his first goal, in the round of 16 in the Coupe de France to send them to the quarter-final, in a 1–0 win over Dijon. and his second goal was followed up in the league match, in a 3–1 loss against Marseille. Later in the 2005–06 season, Oliech made nine appearances and scoring twice.

In the 2006–07 season, Oliech scored four times in thirty-two appearances and the season was proved to be difficult for him, as he soon lost his first team place. Despite lack of first team opportunities and linked with a Premier League club, Oliech says he is happy at the club. However, FC Nantes were relegated in 2007 after finishing bottom of Ligue 1.

=== Auxerre ===
In the summer transfer window, Oliech was signed on loan by Auxerre who were in need of goals after a bad start to their season. After two months absent, Oliech finally made his debut, in a 5–3 win over Lorient. After making ten appearances so far in the 2007–08 season, Auxerre signed him on a permanent basis from Nantes in January and keeping him until 2011. Later in the 2007/2008 season, Oliech scored three goals in 24 games, including a brace against Rennes.

He endured what were considered below-average seasons by most in the 2008–09 (scoring three goals in thirty three appearances in all competitions) and 2009–10 season (scoring four goals in thirty seven appearances in all competitions), as his form dropped badly, due to him making several match deciding errors and misjudgments. Then, in the 2010–11 season, Oliech received more confidence by Manager Jean Fernandez, who gave him more playing time. On 25 September 2010, Oliech scored twice in a 2–2 draw against Rennes. After featuring twice in the Champions League so far, Oliech was sent-off after receiving a second yellow card, in a 2–1 loss against Ajax in Matchday Three in the Champions League Group-Stage. Though Auxerre did badly in the Champions League Group-Stage, finishing last, with one point, Oliech featured five games. On 5 January 2011, he signed a new two-year contract, which he will remain until at least the summer of 2013. At the end of the 2010–11 season, Oliech scored four times in forty-three appearances.

In 2011–12 season changed when the club appointed Laurent Fournier as their new manager. On 25 September 2011, Oliech scored his first ever hat-trick for Auxerre in a 4–1 win over Sochaux. The hat-trick was accomplished within the span of 16 minutes. Soon after, in early December, Oliech scored two goals in two consecutive matches, against PSG and Nice. Though later in the season, his form dropped badly, due to making several match deciding errors and misjudgements, having his goalscoring form had gone less and it couldn't get worse for the club, as they are relegated to Ligue 2, but Oliech was the club's top scorer.

At the end of the 2011–12 season, Oliech had since attracted interests from clubs around Europe and France and was expected to leave the club. Oliech was close to joining Turkish side Kasımpaşa for two million and contract detail of three years. But unfortunately, the move couldn't be agreed and he made a return to Auxerre. In the 2012–13 season, Oliech would score three goals in seventeen league appearances in the first half of the season.

=== Ajaccio ===
In the January transfer window, Oliech announced he wanted to leave Auxerre, ending a six-year association with the club on 15 January 2013, so he could take on a fresh challenge. On 22 January 2013, Oliech was unveiled by Ajaccio of Ligue 1 after completing a move from Ligue 2 side Auxerre and signing a two-and-a-half-year contract. He was handed the number 29 jersey and went on to score on his debut against Evian Thonon Gaillard in a 1–1 draw, which he was delighted to score on his debut.

=== Dubai CSC ===
On 12 February 2015, Oliech terminated his contract with AC Ajaccio, which was to run until June 2015 on mutual consent. The club then announced that Oliech would join UAE Arabian Gulf League side Al-Nasr. However, on 21 April 2015, it was confirmed that Oliech had joined Dubai CSC in the UAE Division 1 league and not Al-Nasr.

=== Gor Mahia ===
On 2 January 2019, 33-year-old Dennis Oliech agreed to a two-year contract with Kenyan giants Gor Mahia, becoming the highest paid footballer in the country at a fee of Kshs.350,000.

== International career ==
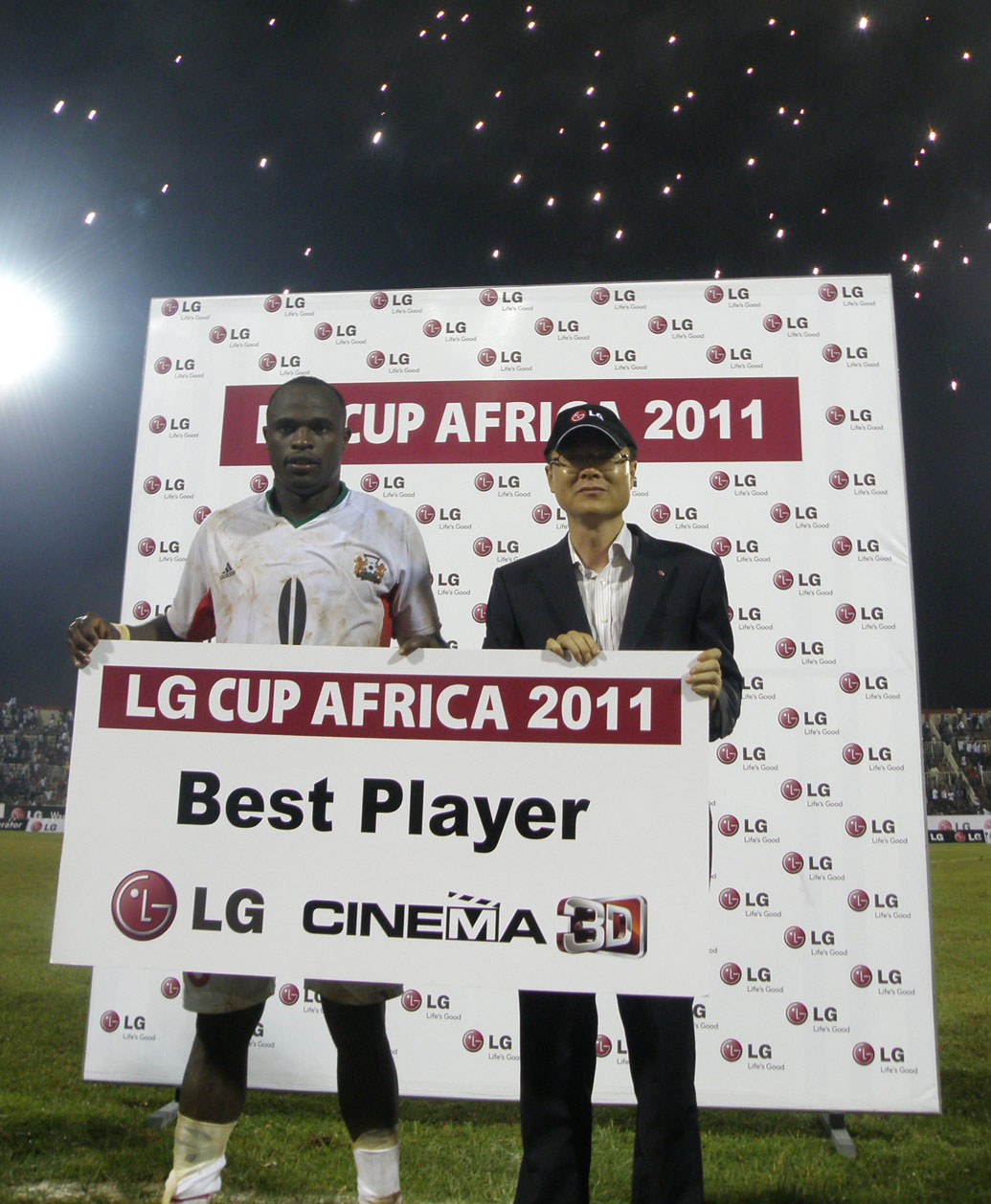
Oliech at the 2011 LG Cup in Nairobi

His first international match was in 2002 when Kenya lost to Nigeria 3–0.

He scored five goals at the 2002 CECAFA Cup, leading Kenya to the title as well as getting the top scorer award.

Oliech scored three goals, including the winning goal against Cape Verde Islands in the final match of the 2004 African Cup of Nations qualification as Kenya qualified for the final tournament. He also scored a goal in a 3–0 win over Burkina Faso in the 2004 African Cup of Nations itself.

In 2005, Oliech sparked controversy when he refused to join the national team squad. This decision came after officials from the Kenya Football Federation (KFF) failed to pay him US$1,700, money he claimed was owed to him. His mother defended him, believing he had a right to demand his money from the Kenya Football Federation. Days before that, Oliech injured his knee ahead of a 2006 World Cup qualifier, but later revealed he quickly recovered from the minor injury. Eight days later, Oliech apologised for his behaviour over the entire situation.

On 24 March 2016, Oliech announced his retirement from international football.

Most Kenyans believe Oliech's biggest match was against Cape Verde when he scored a last minute goal to allow Harambee Stars to qualify for AFCON Championship in 2004. When asked about his biggest match for the national team, he said "for us football strikers, all matches are big because we have to score. If we don't score then that match wasn't big."

== Personal life ==
Oliech's older brother, Nixon Onywanda, is the coach of the Kenyan side Dagoretti Santos (for which Oliech once played). Oliech has a son with his girlfriend and drives a Porche car and lives in an expansive house. In June 2011, Oliech purchased himself a new car, the Chrysler 300C SRT-8 series.

In late 2005, a warrant of arrest was issued against Oliech after he failed to appear in court to answer to assault charges raised against him.

In late May 2006, Oliech was admitted to hospital after a disagreement, which led to a brawl and left him with face injuries. This just came after being in hospital following an injury in an exhibition match in Maringo during a local tournament.

== Career statistics ==
=== Club ===
Appearances and goals by club, season and competition
Club	Season	League			National cup		League cup		Continental		Other		Total	
Club	Season	Division	Apps	Goals	Apps	Goals	Apps	Goals	Apps	Goals	Apps	Goals	Apps	Goals
Al-Arabi	2003–04	Qatar Stars League		3										
Al-Arabi	2004–05	Qatar Stars League		21										
Al-Arabi	2005–06	Qatar Stars League		3										
Al-Arabi	Total			27										

=== International ===
Scores and results list Kenya's goal tally first, score column indicates score after each Oliech goal.

List of international goals scored by Dennis Oliech
No.	Date	Venue	Opponent	Score	Result	Competition
1	7 September 2002	Moi International Sports Centre, Nairobi, Kenya	Togo	3–0	3–0	2004 African Cup of Nations qualifier
2	3 December 2002	CCM Kirumba Stadium, Mwanza, Tanzania	Burundi	1–0	1–1	2002 CECAFA Cup
3	6 December 2002	National Stadium, Dar es Salaam, Tanzania	Eritrea	2–0	4–1	2002 CECAFA Cup
4	6 December 2002	National Stadium, Dar es Salaam, Tanzania	Eritrea	3–1	4–1	2002 CECAFA Cup
5	9 December 2002	National Stadium, Dar es Salaam, Tanzania	Sudan	1–0	1–0	2002 CECAFA Cup
6	14 December 2002	National Stadium, Dar es Salaam, Tanzania	Tanzania	3–2	3–2	2002 CECAFA Cup
7	15 March 2003	Moi International Sports Centre, Nairobi, Kenya	Uganda	2–0	2–2	Friendly
8	23 March 2003	Moi International Sports Centre, Nairobi, Kenya	Tanzania	3–0	4–0	Friendly
9	29 March 2003	Moi International Sports Centre, Nairobi, Kenya	Mauritania	3–0	4–0	2004 African Cup of Nations qualification
10	31 May 2003	Moi International Sports Centre, Nairobi, Kenya	Trinidad and Tobago	1–1	1–1	Friendly
11	13 June 2003	Accra Sports Stadium, Accra, Ghana	Ghana	2–0	3–1	Friendly
12	5 July 2003	Moi International Sports Centre, Nairobi, Kenya	Cape Verde	1–0	1–0	2004 African Cup of Nations qualification
13	15 November 2003	Moi International Sports Centre, Nairobi, Kenya	Tanzania	1–0	3–0	2006 FIFA World Cup qualification
14	15 November 2003	Moi International Sports Centre, Nairobi, Kenya	Tanzania	3–0	3–0	2006 FIFA World Cup qualification
15	2 February 2004	Stade 15 Octobre, Bizerte, Tunis, Tunisia	Burkina Faso	2–0	3–0	2004 Africa Cup of Nations
16	4 September 2004	Moi International Sports Centre, Nairobi, Kenya	Malawi	2–0	3–2	2006 FIFA World Cup qualification
17	9 October 2004	National Stadium, Gaborone, Botswana	Botswana	1–0	1–2	2006 FIFA World Cup qualification
18	17 November 2004	Nyayo National Stadium, Nairobi, Kenya	Guinea	1–0	2–1	2006 FIFA World Cup qualification
19	26 March 2005	Moi International Sports Centre, Nairobi, Kenya	Guinea	1–0	1–0	2006 FIFA World Cup qualification
20	8 September 2007	Nyayo National Stadium, Nairobi, Kenya	Angola	2–1	2–1	2008 Africa Cup of Nations qualification
21	7 June 2008	Nyayo National Stadium, Nairobi, Kenya	Guinea	1–0	2–0	2010 FIFA World Cup qualification
22	7 June 2008	Nyayo National Stadium, Nairobi, Kenya	Guinea	2–0	2–0	2010 FIFA World Cup qualification
23	14 June 2008	Nyayo National Stadium, Nairobi, Kenya	Zimbabwe	2–0	2–0	2010 FIFA World Cup qualification
24	12 October 2008	Stade du 28 Septembre, Conakry, Ivory Coast	Guinea	2–3	2–3	2010 FIFA World Cup qualification
25	28 March 2009	Nyayo National Stadium, Nairobi, Kenya	Tunisia	1–1	1–2	2010 FIFA World Cup qualification
26	14 November 2009	Moi International Sports Centre, Nairobi, Kenya	Nigeria	1–0	2–3	2010 FIFA World Cup qualification
27	25 June 2011	Nyayo National Stadium, Nairobi, Kenya	Sudan	1–1	1–2	Friendly
28	3 September 2011	Nyayo National Stadium, Nairobi, Kenya	Guinea-Bissau	2–1	2–1	2012 Africa Cup of Nations qualification
29	11 November 2011	Stade Linité, Victoria, Seychelles	Seychelles	2–0	3–0	2014 FIFA World Cup qualification
30	11 November 2011	Stade Linité, Victoria, Seychelles	Seychelles	3–0	3–0	2014 FIFA World Cup qualification
31	15 November 2011	Nyayo National Stadium, Nairobi, Kenya	Seychelles	2–0	4–0	2014 FIFA World Cup qualification
32	16 October 2012	Nyayo National Stadium, Nairobi, Kenya	South Africa	1–1	1–2	Friendly
33	6 February 2013	Stade Chedli Zouiten, Tunis, Tunisia	Libya	1–0	3–0	Friendly
34	6 February 2013	Stade Chedli Zouiten, Tunis, Tunisia	Libya	2–0	3–0	Friendly

== Honours ==
Kenya

- CECAFA Cup: 2002

Individual

- CECAFA Cup Golden Boot: 2002
