= Tó (footballer) =

Mozambican footballer

Personal information
- Full name: Helton Samo Cunha
- Date of birth: 19 May 1980 (age 46)
- Place of birth: Beira, Mozambique
- Height: 1.70 m (5 ft 7 in)
- Position: Striker

Senior career*
Years	Team	Apps	(Gls)
1996–2000	Têxtil do Punguè	?	(?)
2000–2003	Costa do Sol	83	(22)
2003–2006	Jomo Cosmos	15	(5)
2006–2010	Costa do Sol		

International career
2003–2007	Mozambique	10	(2)
- * Club domestic league appearances and goals

Helton Samo Cunha (born 19 May 1980), nicknamed Tó, is a Mozambican former footballer who mostly played as a striker for Costa do Sol.

Born in Beira, Tó began his senior career in 1996 with Têxtil do Punguè and he also played in South Africa for Jomo Cosmos.
