= Abubaker Tabula =

Ugandan footballer (born 1980)

Personal information
- Full name: Abubakari Tabula Sengendo
- Date of birth: 12 June 1980 (age 46)
- Place of birth: Uganda
- Height: 1.76 m (5 ft 9 in)
- Position: Defender

Team information
- Current team: Kiira Young FC
- Number: 2

Senior career*
Years	Team	Apps	(Gls)
1999–2000	SC Villa		
2001–2004	Kampala City Council FC	6	(1)
2005–2007	APR FC	10	(1)
2007–2008	GIF Sundsvall	18	(0)
2010–2013	Proline FC		
2013–2014	Bright Stars FC		
2015–	Kiira Young FC		

International career
2000–2008	Uganda	36	(4)
- * Club domestic league appearances and goals

Abubaker Tabula (born 12 June 1980) is a Ugandan footballer and coach. He is a former player on Uganda National football team The "Uganda Cranes" and also captained the team in 2005.

== Career ==
The defender played previously for SC Villa 2001, Kampala City Council FC 2005 Proline FC in 2013, Simba FC, Rwandan club APR FC 2007 and recently in Sweden for GIF Sundsvall.

Tabula currently coaches Maroons FC in Uganda. He is one of the best left back in Uganda. He is also a member of All Start.

He is remembered fog to remove an alleged fetish in a 2004 Afcon qualifier against Rwanda at Namboole.

== See also ==
- Maroons FC
- Uganda national football team
- SC Villa
- Kampala Capital City Authority FC
