= Isaac Mulyanga =

Ugandan footballer (born 1984)

Personal information
- Full name: Isaac Kamu Mulyanga
- Date of birth: 3 August 1984 (age 42)
- Place of birth: Uganda
- Position: Midfielder

Senior career*
Years	Team	Apps	(Gls)
–2006	Police		
2007	Đồng Nai		
2008	Long An		
2009–2011	Hòa Phát Hà Nội		
2012–2013	Long An		
2013–2017	Sadolin Paints		

International career
2002	Uganda	3	(2)
- * Club domestic league appearances and goals

Isaac Kamu Mulyanga (born 3 August 1984), also known as Phan Lê Isaac, is an Ugandan former footballer who last played as a midfielder for Long An.

== Career ==
In 2009, he signed for Vietnamese side Hòa Phát Hà Nội, helping the club achieve promotion. He was naturalized while playing for the club.

== Style of play ==
He mainly operated as a central midfielder.

== Personal life ==
After retiring from professional football, he fell into poverty in Vietnam. He also suffered from illness and kidney problems.
