= Aimé Nzohabonayo =

Burundian footballer

Personal information
- Full name: Jean-Claude Ndarusanze
- Date of birth: 7 September 1989 (age 37)
- Position: Forward

Team information
- Current team: AS Inter Star
Medal record
Men's football
Representing Burundi
CECAFA Cup
Runner-up	2004 Ethiopia

Aimé Nzohabonayo (born 7 September 1989) is a Burundian professional footballer, who plays as a forward for AS Inter Star in the Burundi Football League.

== International career ==
He was invited by Lofty Naseem, the national team coach, to represent Burundi in the 2014 African Nations Championship held in South Africa.

== Honours ==
Burundi

- CECAFA Cup: Runner-up, 2004
