= Jean Lomami =

Rwandan footballer

Personal information
- Date of birth: 27 July 1982 (age 44)
- Place of birth: Bujumbura, Burundi

International career
Years	Team	Apps	(Gls)
2003–2009	Rwanda	26	(14)

Jean Lomami (born 27 July 1982) is a Rwandan footballer. He played in 26 matches for the Rwanda national football team from 2003 to 2009. He was also named in Rwanda's squad for the 2004 African Cup of Nations tournament.

== Career statistics ==
=== International ===
Appearances and goals by national team and year
National team	Year	Apps	Goals
Rwanda	2003	4	3
Rwanda	2004	10	6
Rwanda	2005	7	4
Rwanda	2006	1	0
Rwanda	2009	4	1
Total		26	14

Scores and results list Rwanda's goal tally first, score column indicates score after each Lomani goal.

List of international goals scored by Jean Lomami
No.	Date	Venue	Opponent	Score	Result	Competition	Ref.
1	12 October 2003	Amahoro Stadium, Kigali, Rwanda	Namibia	3–0	3–0	2006 FIFA World Cup qualification	
2	15 November 2003	Independence Stadium, Windhoek, Namibia	Namibia	1–0	1–1	2006 FIFA World Cup qualification	
3	8 December 2003	Khartoum Stadium, Khartoum, Sudan	Kenya	1–0	1–1	2003 CECAFA Cup	
4	11 December 2004	Addis Ababa Stadium, Addis Ababa, Ethiopia	Zanzibar	1–1	4-2	2004 CECAFA Cup	
5	11 December 2004	Addis Ababa Stadium, Addis Ababa, Ethiopia	Zanzibar	2–1	4-2	2004 CECAFA Cup	
6	11 December 2004	Addis Ababa Stadium, Addis Ababa, Ethiopia	Zanzibar	3–1	4-2	2004 CECAFA Cup	
7	19 December 2004	Addis Ababa Stadium, Addis Ababa, Ethiopia	Tanzania	1–0	5–1	2004 CECAFA Cup	
8	19 December 2004	Addis Ababa Stadium, Addis Ababa, Ethiopia	Tanzania	3–0	5–1	2004 CECAFA Cup	
9	19 December 2004	Addis Ababa Stadium, Addis Ababa, Ethiopia	Tanzania	5–1	5–1	2004 CECAFA Cup	
10	30 November 2005	Amahoro Stadium, Kigali, Rwanda	Eritrea	—	3–2	2005 CECAFA Cup	
11	30 November 2005	Amahoro Stadium, Kigali, Rwanda	Eritrea	—	3–2	2005 CECAFA Cup	
12	6 December 2005	Amahoro Stadium, Kigali, Rwanda	Tanzania	2—1	3–1	2005 CECAFA Cup	
13	6 December 2005	Amahoro Stadium, Kigali, Rwanda	Tanzania	3—1	3–1	2005 CECAFA Cup	
14	9 January 2009	Mandela National Stadium, Kira Town, Uganda	Zanzibar	3–0	3–0	2008 CECAFA Cup	
