= Jean Hakizimana =

Burundian footballer

Personal information
- Full name: Jean Marie Vianney Hakizimana
- Date of birth: January 31, 1985 (age 41)
- Place of birth: Bujumbura, Burundi
- Position: Striker

Team information
- Current team: AS Inter Star

Senior career*
Years	Team	Apps	(Gls)
2001–2002	Prince Louis FC	19	(8)
2003	Muzinga	17	(12)
2004–2007	Mukura Victory Sports FC	47	(9)
2008–present	AS Inter Star	38	(11)

International career
2003–2006	Burundi	4	(0)
Medal record
Men's football
Representing Burundi
CECAFA Cup
Runner-up	2004 Ethiopia
- * Club domestic league appearances and goals

Jean Marie Vianney Hakizimana (born 31 January 1985, in Bujumbura) is a Burundian striker who plays with AS Inter Star.

== Career ==
He has formerly played in Rwanda for Mukura Victory Sports FC and in his homeland for Prince Louis FC.

== International career ==
Hakizimana was member of the Burundi national football team.

== Honours ==
Burundi

- CECAFA Cup: Runner-up, 2004
