= Okoth =

Okoth is a surname. Notable people with the surname include:

- Benard Otieno Okoth, Kenyan politician
- John Eliud Okoth (born 1958), Kenyan field hockey player
- Ken Okoth (1978-2019), Kenyan politician
- Nick Okoth (born 1983), Kenyan amateur boxer
- Yona Okoth (1926-2001), Ugandan Anglican archbishop
- Zacchaeus Okoth (born 1942), Kenyan Roman Catholic archbishop
