= Amir Maftah =

Tanzanian footballer

Personal information
- Full name: Amir Mrisho Maftah
- Date of birth: 25 December 1988 (age 37)
- Place of birth: Mwanza, Tanzania
- Height: 5 ft 7 in (1.70 m)
- Position: Left back

Senior career*
Years	Team	Apps	(Gls)
2005–2006	Mtibwa Sugar		
2007–2010	Young Africans		
2010–2013	Simba		
2013–2017	Friends Rangers		
2017–2018	Toto African		
2018	3 de Fevereiro		

International career
2005–2012	Tanzania	33	(1)
- * Club domestic league appearances and goals

Amir Maftah (born 25 December 1988) is a retired Tanzanian footballer. A left back, he played for Young Africans and Simba among others. He was also a member of the Tanzania national football team.

On May 18, 2010, Young Africans dropped Maftah from next season's player registration list over alleged indiscipline.
