= Toamasina =

Toamasina Tamatave
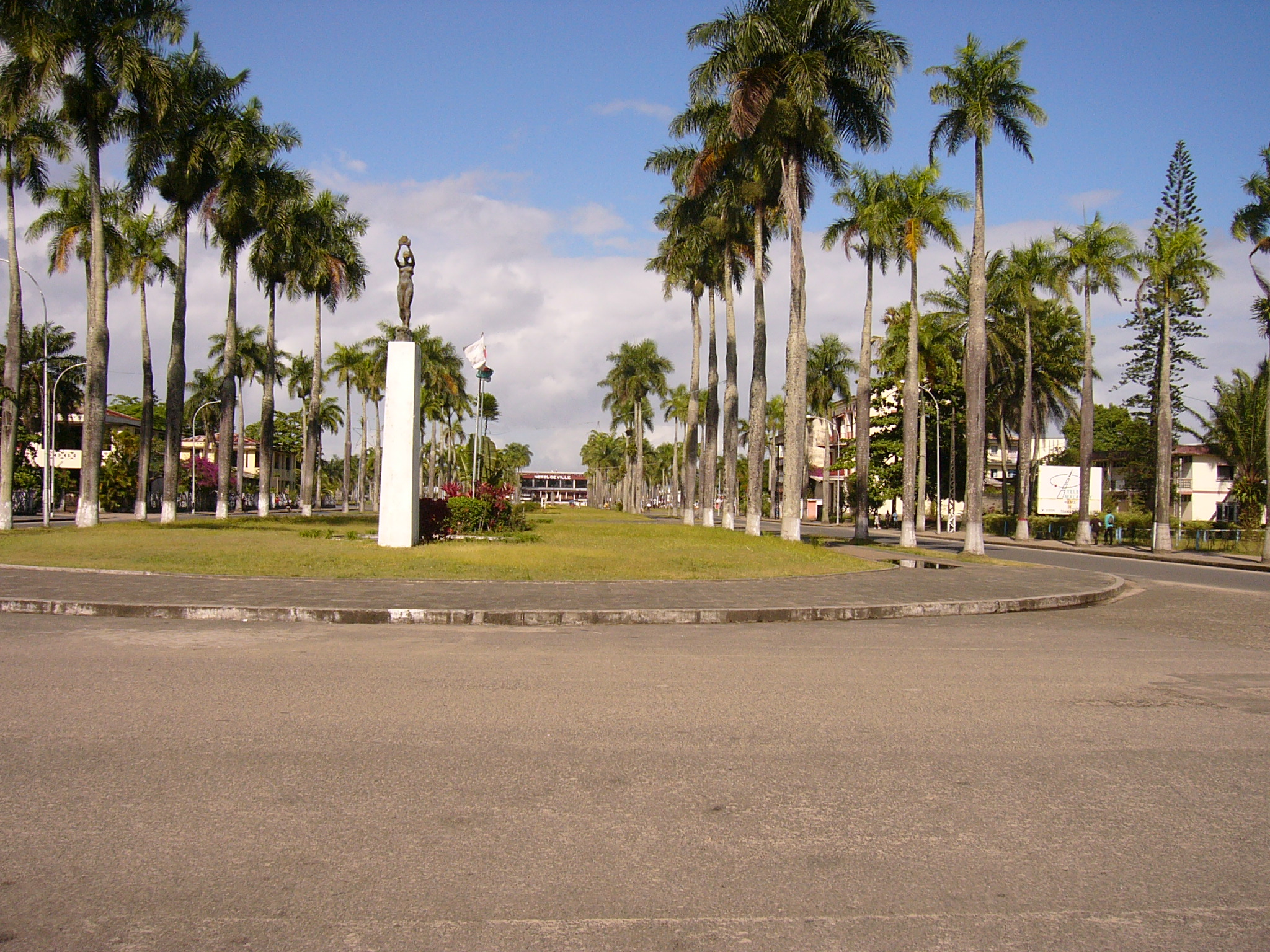
- Toamasina

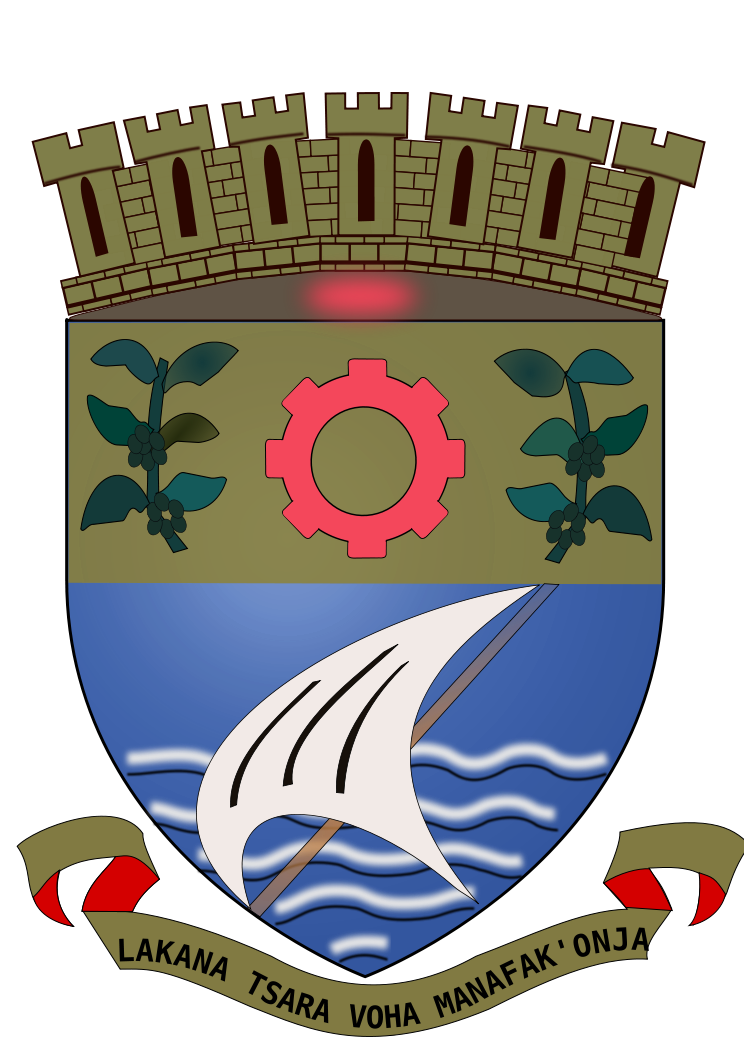
- Coat of arms
- Motto: Lakana tsara voha manafak'onja ("A good boat, open to the waves")
- Location in Madagascar
- Coordinates: 18°09′18″S 49°24′36″E
- Country: Madagascar
- Region: Atsinanana

Government
  - Mayor: Nantenaina Rakotonirina

Area
  - Total: 30.9 km^{2} (11.9 sq mi)
- Elevation: 11 m (36 ft)

Population (2018 census)
  - Total: 325,857
  - Density: 10,500/km^{2} (27,300/sq mi)
  - Ethnicities: Betsimisaraka
- Time zone: UTC3 (EAT)
- Postal code: 501
- Area code: +261
- Climate: Af

Toamasina (Malagasy pronunciation: [toˈmasinə̥]), meaning "like salt" or "salty", unofficially and in French Tamatave or in the past as Port aux prunes, is the capital of the Atsinanana region on the east coast of Madagascar on the Indian Ocean. The city is the chief seaport of the country, situated 215 km (134 mi) northeast of its capital and largest city Antananarivo. In 2018 Toamasina had a population of 325,857. It is the second-largest city in Madagascar, after Antananarivo.

== History ==
Downtown in 1912

Under French rule, Toamasina was the seat of several foreign consuls, as well as of numerous French officials, and was the chief port for the capital and the interior. Imports consisted principally of piece-goods, farinaceous foods, and iron and steel goods; main exports were gold dust, raffia, hides, caoutchouc (natural rubber) and live animals. Communication with Europe was maintained by steamers of the Messageries Maritimes and the Havraise companies, and also with Mauritius, and thence to Sri Lanka, by the British Union-Castle Line.

During the colonial period, owing to the character of the soil and the formerly crowded native population, the town was often plagued by epidemics; the plague broke out in 1898, and again in 1900. Since the draining of the neighboring marshes, there is some improvement, although there are still outbreaks of malaria and other diseases, such as chikungunya.

== Notable person ==
- André Michaux (1746–1802), botanist and explorer, died in Tamatave.

== Geography ==
Toamasina owes its importance to the existence of a coral reef which forms a spacious harbour, entered by two openings. The city center is built on a sandy peninsula which projects at right angles from the general coastline.

South of the town there is the mouth of the Ivondro River in the Indian Ocean.

=== Climate ===
Toamasina features a trade-wind tropical rainforest climate under the Köppen climate classification. While Toamasina has no true dry season month where less than 60 mm (2.4 in) of precipitation (on average) falls, the seaport has noticeably wetter and drier periods of the year. September–November is the driest period of the year, while February–April is the wettest time of the year. Average temperatures are relatively constant throughout the course of the year, though it is slightly cooler in the months of July and August, where average highs are around 24 °C (75 °F), and warmer in the months of January and February, where high temperatures on average are 30 °C (86 °F). Toamasina averages 3,368.2 mm (132.61 in) of precipitation annually.

Climate data for Toamasina (1991–2020, extremes 1889–present)
Month	Jan	Feb	Mar	Apr	May	Jun	Jul	Aug	Sep	Oct	Nov	Dec	Year
Record high °C (°F)	37.4 (99.3)	38.6 (101.5)	39.0 (102.2)	35.0 (95.0)	34.0 (93.2)	29.6 (85.3)	31.2 (88.2)	30.2 (86.4)	30.6 (87.1)	33.2 (91.8)	33.0 (91.4)	33.6 (92.5)	39.0 (102.2)
Mean daily maximum °C (°F)	30.7 (87.3)	30.9 (87.6)	30.4 (86.7)	29.5 (85.1)	28.0 (82.4)	26.4 (79.5)	25.2 (77.4)	25.5 (77.9)	26.3 (79.3)	27.5 (81.5)	28.9 (84.0)	30.2 (86.4)	28.3 (82.9)
Daily mean °C (°F)	26.9 (80.4)	27.0 (80.6)	26.7 (80.1)	25.7 (78.3)	24.2 (75.6)	22.6 (72.7)	21.3 (70.3)	21.5 (70.7)	22.1 (71.8)	23.4 (74.1)	24.8 (76.6)	26.3 (79.3)	24.4 (75.9)
Mean daily minimum °C (°F)	23.2 (73.8)	23.1 (73.6)	23.0 (73.4)	21.9 (71.4)	20.2 (68.4)	18.7 (65.7)	17.4 (63.3)	17.3 (63.1)	17.8 (64.0)	19.3 (66.7)	20.8 (69.4)	22.3 (72.1)	20.4 (68.7)
Record low °C (°F)	18.0 (64.4)	17.5 (63.5)	17.0 (62.6)	15.0 (59.0)	13.2 (55.8)	11.0 (51.8)	11.8 (53.2)	10.0 (50.0)	11.0 (51.8)	11.0 (51.8)	13.5 (56.3)	16.0 (60.8)	10.0 (50.0)
Average precipitation mm (inches)	412.2 (16.23)	438.0 (17.24)	454.6 (17.90)	299.6 (11.80)	269.7 (10.62)	276.8 (10.90)	279.7 (11.01)	178.5 (7.03)	117.9 (4.64)	98.9 (3.89)	121.4 (4.78)	250.6 (9.87)	3,197.9 (125.91)
Average precipitation days (≥ 1.0 mm)	18.5	17.4	19.5	15.7	17.2	19.7	21.3	17.3	13.8	12.1	10.9	15.4	198.8
Average relative humidity (%)	83	83	85	84	85	85	84	85	83	82	83	84	84
Mean monthly sunshine hours	224.7	198.2	191.0	196.9	192.1	162.5	162.8	184.6	209.7	232.7	236.0	219.2	2,410.4
Source 1: NOAA
Source 2: Deutscher Wetterdienst (humidity, 1951–1967), Meteo Climat (record highs and lows)

== Transport ==
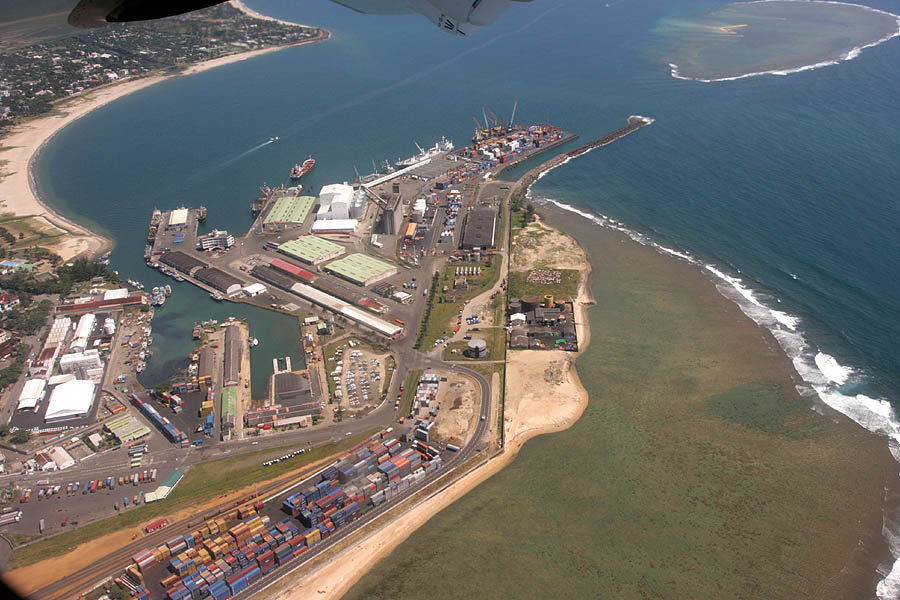
The port of Toamasina

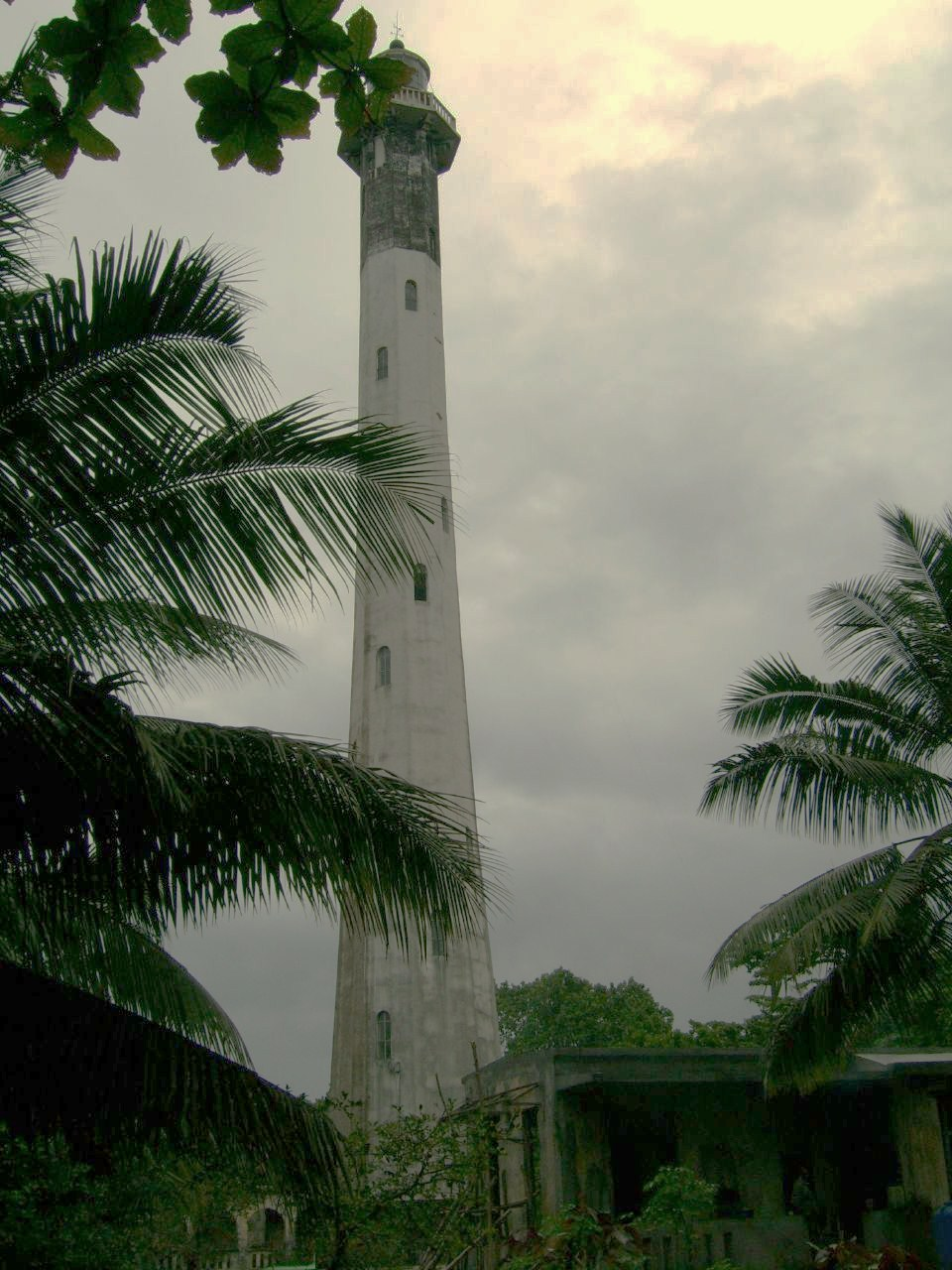
Lighthouse of Ile aux Prunes

The town is the railhead for the line to the capital. Pousse-pousse (bicycle rickshaws), tuk-tuk (motorized rickshaws), and taxis are available throughout Toamasina to get around the city. Toamasina is the northern end of the Canal des Pangalanes.

The port of Toamasina serves as Madagascar's most important gateway to the Indian Ocean and to the world.

The city is served by Ambalamanasy Airport, which has limited domestic and international service. The city is the country's main seaport for international shipping.

=== Roads ===
- National Road 2 leads westwards to Antananarivo
- National Road 5 leads northwards to Maroantsetra.

== Education ==
The University of Toamasina was founded in 1977. There is also a Lycée Français de Tamatave, a French international school.

== Hospitals ==
The CHU Morafeno is the university hospital of Toamasina.

== Sports ==
The Barikadimy Stadium with a capacity 25,000 spectators. It mostly hosts football competitions and the AS Fortior and Tia Kitra FC Toamasina.

== Places of worship ==
Among the places of worship, they are predominantly Christian churches and temples: Church of Jesus Christ in Madagascar, Malagasy Lutheran Church, Assemblies of God, Association of Bible Baptist Churches in Madagascar, Roman Catholic Archdiocese of Toamasina (Catholic Church seated in the Cathedral of St. Joseph) and Iglesia ni Cristo. There are also Muslim mosques.

== Neighborhoods ==
- Anjoma
- Tanamakoa
- Tanambao V
- Mangarivotra
- Ankirihiry
- Manangareza
- Andranomadio
- Ambohijafy

== International relations ==
=== Twin towns – Sister cities ===
Toamasina is twinned with:

- Saint-Étienne, France
- Le Port, Réunion

== See also ==
- Battle of Tamatave, 1811
- Transport in Madagascar
- Parc Ivoloina, a nature park 12 km from the city center.
