= Barikadimy Stadium =

Sports venue in Toamasina, Madagascar

- Interactive map of Barikadimy Stadium
- Full name: Stade Barikadimy
- Location: Toamasina, Madagascar
- Coordinates: 18°08′48.66″S 49°23′9.99″E
- Capacity: 15,000
- Surface: Synthetic grass

Tenants
- AS Fortior; Madagascar national football team

Barikadimy Stadium is a multi-purpose stadium in Toamasina, Madagascar. It is currently used mostly for football matches. It hosts the home games of AS Fortior of the THB Champions League. The stadium has a capacity 15,000 spectators. The stadium was the venue for AS Adema 149–0 SO l'Emyrne, the highest scoring match in football's history.
