= Stephen Nsereko =

Ugandan footballer (born 1986)

Personal information
- Full name: Stephen Nsereko
- Date of birth: July 20, 1986 (age 40)
- Place of birth: Kampala, Uganda
- Height: 5 ft 9 in (1.75 m)
- Position: Midfielder

Youth career
- Buganda College

College career
Years	Team	Apps	(Gls)
2006–2009	Winthrop Eagles		

Senior career*
Years	Team	Apps	(Gls)
2003–2006	Villa Kampala		
2007	Hampton Roads Piranhas	10	(0)
2008	Fredericksburg Gunners	12	(1)
2010	Richmond Kickers	14	(0)
Total		36	(1)

International career
2004–2005	Uganda	4	(0)
- * Club domestic league appearances and goals

Stephen Nsereko (born July 20, 1986) is a Ugandan retired footballer.

== Career ==
=== College and amateur ===
Nsereko attended Buganda College in his native Uganda, and played professionally for Villa Kampala in the Ugandan Super League, before moving to the United States in 2006 to attend and play college soccer at Winthrop University. He was selected as the 2006 Big South Conference Freshman of the Year, was named to the Big South Conference All-Freshmen Team, and was selected by CollegeSoccerNews as one of the Top 100 Freshmen in 2006, and went on to be a Three Time All-Big South Conference and All-South Atlantic Region.

Nsereko also played with the Hampton Roads Piranhas and the Fredericksburg Gunners in the USL Premier Development League.

=== Professional ===
Nsereko turned professional in 2010 when he signed with the Richmond Kickers of the USL Second Division. He made his debut for the team on May 16, 2010 in a game against Real Maryland Monarchs.

=== International ===
Nsereko is a full member of the Uganda national football team; he appeared in three of his country's games in the qualifying tournament for the 2006 FIFA World Cup, against Burkina Faso, Ghana and Cape Verde.
