= Anthony Mathenge =

Kenyan footballer (born 1978)

Personal information
- Full name: Anthony Mathenge Gitau
- Date of birth: 23 October 1978 (age 48)
- Position: Midfielder

Senior career*
Years	Team	Apps	(Gls)
2002–2009	Thika United		

International career
2002–2009	Kenya	24	(2)
- * Club domestic league appearances and goals

Anthony Mathenge Gitau (born 23 October 1978) is a Kenyan footballer. He played in 24 matches for the Kenya national football team from 2002 to 2009. He was also named in Kenya's squad for the 2004 African Cup of Nations tournament.
