= Jimmy Gatete =

Rwandan footballer

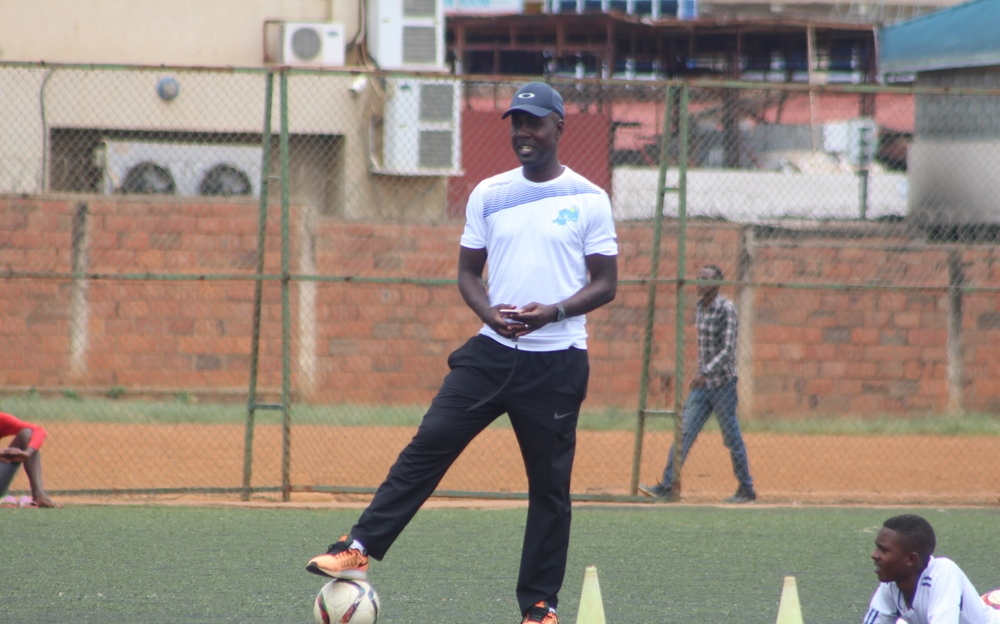

Personal information
- Full name: Jean-Michel Gatete
- Date of birth: December 11, 1979 (age 46)
- Place of birth: Bujumbura, Burundi
- Height: 1.83 m (6 ft 0 in)
- Position: Striker

Senior career*
Years	Team	Apps	(Gls)
- MUKURA VS F.C.
2002–2004	APR FC		
2004–2005	Maritzburg United		
2005–2007	APR FC		
2007–2009	Rayon Sport		
2009	Police FC Kibungo		
2010	St. George		

International career
2001–2009	Rwanda	42	(8)
- * Club domestic league appearances and goals

Jimmy Gatete (born December 11, 1979, in Bujumbura) is a retired Rwandan footballer.

== Career ==
Gatete has made several appearances for the Rwanda national football team. He scored crucial goals during the 2004 African Cup of Nations (CAN) qualifications which saw the Rwanda national football team (Amavubi) reach its first ever CAN finals. The most celebrated goal in Rwandan history is presumably his goal against the Black Stars of Ghana at Stade Amahoro in Kigali in March 2003 which led to Rwanda's 1–0 win and handed them their ticket to Tunis the following year.

Gatete has played club football for local sides Mukura Victory Sports F.C., APR FC and Rayon Sport. He also had a brief spell in South Africa with Maritzburg United, and in Ethiopia with Saint George F.C.

Gatete scored 25 goals in 42 competitive appearances for Rwanda.

== Career statistics ==
Scores and results list Rwanda's goal tally first, score column indicates score after each Gatete goal.

List of international goals scored by Jimmy Gatete
No.	Date	Venue	Opponent	Score	Result	Competition
1	30 November 2002	Sheikh Amri Abeid Memorial Stadium, Arusha, Tanzania	Zanzibar	1–0	1–0	2002 CECAFA Cup
2	7 June 2003	Nakivubo Stadium, Kampala, Uganda	Uganda	1–0	1–0	2004 Africa Cup of Nations qualification
3	6 July 2003	Amahoro Stadium, Kigali, Rwanda	Ghana	1–0	1–0	2004 Africa Cup of Nations qualification
4	13 December 2004	Addis Ababa Stadium, Addis Ababa, Ethiopia	Burundi	1–2	1–3	2004 CECAFA Cup
5	5 June 2005	Amahoro Stadium, Kigali, Rwanda	Nigeria	1–0	1–1	2006 FIFA World Cup qualification
6	30 November 2005	Amahoro Stadium, Kigali, Rwanda	Eritrea	?–2	3–2	2005 CECAFA Cup
7	6 December 2005	Amahoro Stadium, Kigali, Rwanda	Tanzania	1–0	3–1	2005 CECAFA Cup
8	17 June 2007	Roumdé Adjia Stadium, Garoua, Cameroon	Cameroon	1–2	1–2	2008 Africa Cup of Nations qualification
