= JS Libreville =

- Full name: Jeunesse Sportive de Libreville
- Founded: 2001
- Ground: Stade Omar Bongo; Libreville, Gabon
- Capacity: 45,000
- Chairman: Aboubacar Ndong Otsaghe
- Manager: Guy-Blaise Ngamamba
- League: Gabon Championnat National D2
Home colours	Away colours

Jeunesse Sportive de Libreville is a Gabonese football club based in Libreville, Gabon.

The club's colours are green and white.

== Performance in CAF competitions ==
- CAF Cup Winners' Cup: 1 appearance

2003 – First Round
