= Elias Ntaganda =

Rwandan footballer

Personal information
- Date of birth: 1 January 1982 (age 44)
- Place of birth: Kinshasa, Zaire
- Height: 1.70 m (5 ft 7 in)
- Position: Defender

Youth career
- APR FC

Senior career*
| Years | Team | Apps | (Gls) |
| 1997– 2011 | APR FC | 142 | (8) |

International career
| 2000–2009 | Rwanda | 38 | (0) |
- * Club domestic league appearances and goals

Elias Ntaganda (born 1 January 1982 in Kinshasa) is a Rwandan retired Football player who recently played for APR FC.

== International career ==
Ntaganda was a member of the Rwanda national football team that qualified for and 2004 Africa Cup of Nations.
