= 2004 CECAFA Cup =

Tournament details
- Host country: Ethiopia
- Dates: December 11–25
- Teams: 9 (from 1 sub-confederation)

Final positions
- Champions: Ethiopia (3rd title)
- Runners-up: Burundi
- Third place: Sudan
- Fourth place: Kenya

Tournament statistics
- Matches played: 20
- Goals scored: 64 (3.2 per match)
- Top scorer: (Rwanda) Jean Lomami (6 goals)

The 2004 CECAFA Cup, officially called Amoudi Senior Challenge Cup due to sponsorship reasons, was the 28th edition of the tournament. It was held in Ethiopia, and was won by Ethiopia. The matches were played between December 11–25. All matches were played in the National Stadium in Addis Ababa.

Eritrea and Djibouti withdrew before the draw.

== Group stage ==
=== Group A ===
Team	Pts	Pld	W	D	L	GF	GA	GD
Ethiopia	10	4	3	1	0	7	1	+6
Burundi	9	4	3	0	1	8	4	+4
Rwanda	7	4	2	1	1	10	6	+4
Zanzibar	3	4	1	0	3	7	11	–4
Tanzania	0	4	0	0	4	3	13	–10

December 11, 2004

Rwanda	4–2	Zanzibar
Lomami 8', 28', 48'; Karekezi 24'		Juma 4'; Ndyizeye 88'

December 11, 2004

Ethiopia	2–1	Burundi
Shegere 20'; Lemessa		Hakizimana 75' (pen.)

December 13, 2004

Zanzibar	4–2	Tanzania
Abdalla 6' (pen.); Juma 28', 73'; Mohamed 85'		Mexime 23'; Machupa 32'

December 13, 2004

Burundi	3–1	Rwanda
Hakizimana 51' (pen.); Ntibazonkiza 54'; Nzohabonayo 83'		Gatete 59'

December 15, 2004

Tanzania	0–2	Burundi
		Kubi 46', 90'

December 15, 2004

Rwanda	0–0	Ethiopia

December 17, 2004

Burundi	2–1	Zanzibar
Nashimana 43'; Hakizimana 78' (pen.)		Ibrahim 73'

December 17, 2004

Ethiopia	2–0	Tanzania
Alamirew 55'; Tafese 90'

December 19, 2004

Tanzania	1–5	Rwanda
?		Lomami ?', ?', ?'; Karekezi ?'; Zibomana ?'

December 19, 2004

Zanzibar	0–3	Ethiopia
		Lemessa 50'; Ashenafi 54'; Mensur 64'

=== Group B ===
Team	Pts	Pld	W	D	L	GF	GA	GD
Sudan	7	3	2	1	0	8	3	+5
Kenya	5	3	2	1	0	4	3	+1
Uganda	4	3	1	1	1	4	3	+1
Somalia	0	3	0	0	3	0	7	–7

December 12, 2004

Uganda	2–0	Somalia
Kalungi 30', 42'

December 12, 2004

Kenya	2–2	Sudan
Simiyu 37'; Baraza 73'		M. Ali 45' (pen.); Tambal 79'

December 14, 2004

Sudan	2–1	Uganda
Tambal 3'; El-Rasheed 75'		Mwesigwa 82'

December 14, 2004

Somalia	0–1	Kenya
		Baraza 7'

December 18, 2004

Sudan	4–0	Somalia
Mustafa 47'; Amari 63'; Tambal 69'; Bakhit 90'

December 18, 2004

Kenya	1–1	Uganda
Mururi 20'		Obua 77' (pen.)

== Knockout stage ==
=== Semi-finals ===
December 22, 2004

Ethiopia	2–2 (a.e.t.)	Kenya
Alamirew 24'; Tafese 58'		Mururi 66'; Baraza 85'
Penalties
	5–4

December 22, 2004

Sudan	1–2	Burundi
Mustafa 54' (pen.)		Ntibazonkiza 22'; Kubi 75'

=== Third place match ===
December 24, 2004

Kenya	1–2	Sudan
Baraza 82'		Tambal 30', 60'

=== Final ===
December 24, 2004

Ethiopia	3–0	Burundi
Negusse 25'; Tafese 32'; Alamirew 49'
