= Kabiru Alausa =

Nigerian footballer

Personal information
- Full name: Kabiru Oluwamuyiwa Alausa
- Date of birth: 28 March 1983 (age 43)
- Place of birth: Nigeria
- Position: Forward

Team information
- Current team: Shooting Stars (assistant)

Senior career*
Years	Team	Apps	(Gls)
	Julius Berger		(13+)
–2007	Sunshine Stars		
2008–2009	Heartland		
2009–2010	Sunshine Stars		
2010–2012	Shooting Stars		(1+)
Total			(14+)

Managerial career
- 2016–: Shooting Stars (assistant)
- * Club domestic league appearances and goals

Kabiru Oluwamuyiwa Alausa(born 28 March 1983) is a Nigerian retired footballer who played as a forward. He is an assistant coach at Nigerian club Shooting Stars.

== Career ==
Alausa began his career playing with Julius Berger and was the top scorer of the Nigerian Premier League in 2004, scoring 13 goals on the season. He then moved to Sunshine Stars, where he played through the 2007 season. Alausa spent time at Heartland, helping the club become runners-up in the 2009 CAF Champions League although he missed several matches while on trial in Europe. After a second stint at Sunshine Stars, he finished his playing career with Shooting Stars.
