= Daouda Diakité (Malian footballer) =

Malian footballer

Personal information
- Date of birth: 20 March 1977 (age 49)
- Height: 1.77 m (5 ft 10 in)
- Position: Defender

Senior career*
Years	Team	Apps	(Gls)
1994–1999	AS Real Bamako		
1999—2001	Djoliba AC		
2002–2005	CO Bamako		
2005–2006	Stade Briochin		
2007–2008	Djoliba AC		

International career
1995–2005	Mali	39	(0)
- * Club domestic league appearances and goals

Daouda Diakité (born 20 March 1977) is a Malian footballer. He played in 39 matches for the Mali national football team from 1995 to 2005. He was also named in Mali's squad for the 2002 African Cup of Nations tournament.
