= AS Fortior =

Malagasy football club

- Full name: Association Sportive Fortior
- Ground: Barikadimy Stadium; Toamasina, Madagascar
- Capacity: 25,000
- Chairman: Hervé Rafaravelo
- Manager: Sébastien Rafenoarivo
- League: THB Champions League

AS Fortior is a Malagasy football club based in Toamasina, Madagascar.

== Achievements ==
- THB Champions League: 4

1962, 1963, 1999, 2000

- Coupe de Madagascar: 1

2002

== Performance in CAF competitions ==
- CAF Champions League: 2 appearances

2000 – Preliminary Round
2001 – Preliminary Round

- CAF Cup Winners' Cup: 1 appearance

2003 – Preliminary Round
