= Dawit Mebratu =

Ethiopian footballer

Personal information
- Full name: Dawit Abraha Mebratu
- Date of birth: 13 June 1984 (age 42)
- Place of birth: Ethiopia
- Position: Midfielder

Team information
- Current team: Saint-George SA

Senior career*
Years	Team	Apps	(Gls)
2002–2014	Saint-George SA	?	(?)

International career
2004–2007	Ethiopia		
- * Club domestic league appearances and goals as of 1 February 2007

Dawit Abraha Mebratu (Amharic: ዻዊት ዓብራሃ መብራቱ, born 13 June 1984 in Ethiopia) is an Ethiopian football midfielder. He currently plays for Saint-George SA.

== International career ==
Mebratu was a member of the Ethiopia national football team, and was part of the Ethiopia squad at the 2001 FIFA World Youth Cup.
