= Yasser Ali =

Egyptian presidential spokesperson

Yasser Ali was appointed as head of the Egyptian Cabinet's Information and Decision Support Center by a presidential decree on 14 February 2013. He was a spokesman for Egyptian President Mohamed Morsi from 14 July 2012 to 14 February 2013. He previously acted as the official spokesman of the Freedom and Justice Party (FJP), and presidential campaign coordinator for Morsi in the 2012 General Election.
