= Simeon Masaba =

Ugandan footballer (born 1983)

Simon Masaba
Personal information
- Date of birth: 23 March 1983 (age 43)
- Place of birth: Uganda
- Height: 1.82 m (6 ft 0 in)
- Position: Defender

Team information
- Current team: Uganda Revenue Authority SC

Youth career
- –2002: Villa SC

Senior career*
Years	Team	Apps	(Gls)
2003	Police Jinja		
2004–2005	Villa SC		
2006–2007	Police Jinja		
2008–2010	Villa SC		
2010–present	Uganda Revenue Authority SC		

International career^{‡}
2002–	Uganda	69	(7)
- * Club domestic league appearances and goals as of 31 August 2007 ‡ National team caps and goals as of 13 October 2012 (UTC)

Simeon Masaba (born 23 March 1983) is a Ugandan footballer who plays as a defender for Uganda Revenue Authority SC in Ugandan Premier League.

== Club career ==
He began his career with Police Jinja in the Ugandan Premier League before moving to Villa SC in 2004. He returned back to Police Jinja in 2006, and in 2008 started a second spell with Villa SC. Simeon Masaba chose to join Uganda Revenue Authority on a one-year contract for Shs10m..

== International career ==
Masaba has played for the Uganda national football team earning 69 caps and scoring 7 goals.
