= 2008 Sudan Premier League =

Sudan Premier League
- Season: 2008
- Promoted: Al-Shimali - 2008; Merghani Kassala -2008
- Relegated: Jazeerat Al-Feel - 2008
- 2009 CAF Champions League: Al-Hilal Omdurman; Al-Merreikh
- 2009 CAF Confederation Cup: Hay al-Arab Port Sudan

The 2008 Sudan Premier League was the 37th edition of the highest club level football competition in Sudan. The competition started on February 21 with Al-Ittihad (Wad Medani) 1-0 win over Amal Atbara, and concluded on November 17 with 1-1 draw between Al-Hilal Omdurman and Al-Merreikh. Al-Merreikh were crowned champions.

== Team information ==
Last updated: 6 April 2009

Team	Head Coach	Venue	Capacity	City	State
Al-Ahli (Wad Medani)		Algazira Stadium	15000	Wad Madani	Al Jazirah
Al-Hilal (Kadougli)	Bakri Abdulgalil	Kadugli Stadium	1000	Kaduqli	South Kurdufan
Al-Hilal Omdurman	(Brazil) Dutra	AlHilal Stadium	45,000	Omdurman	Khartoum
Al-Hilal (Port Sudan)		Stade Port Sudan	7,000	Port Sudan	Red Sea
Al-Ittihad (Wad Medani)	(Egypt) Mahir Hamam	Stade Wad Medani	5,000	Wad Madani	Al Jazirah
Al-Merreikh	(Croatia) Rodion Gačanin	Al Merreikh Stadium	42,000	Omdurman	Khartoum
Al-Mourada	Borhan Tia	Stade de Omdurman	14,000	Omdurman	Khartoum
Al-Nil Al-Hasahesa	(Egypt) Gamal Abdallah	Al-Hasahesa Stadium	3,000	Al-Hasahesa	Al Jazirah
Amal Atbara		Stade Al-Amal Atbara	4,000	Atbara	River Nile
Hay al-Arab Port Sudan	(Egypt) Raeft Maki	Stade Port Sudan	7,000	Port Sudan	Red Sea
Al-Khartoum	Alfateh Alnager	Khartoum Stadium	33,500	Khartoum	Khartoum
Jazeerat Al-Feel		Stade Wad Medani	5,000	Wad Madani	Al Jazirah

== Final standings ==
Pos	Team	Pld	W	D	L	GF	GA	GD	Pts	Qualification or relegation
1	Al-Merreikh (C)	22	20	1	1	66	8	+58	61	2009 CAF Champions League
2	Al-Hilal Omdurman	22	19	2	1	63	12	+51	59	2009 CAF Champions League
3	Hay al-Arab Port Sudan	22	10	7	5	26	27	−1	37	2009 CAF Confederation Cup
4	Al-Mourada	22	10	3	9	27	33	−6	33	
5	Al-Nil Al-Hasahesa	22	9	3	10	24	27	−3	30	
6	Al-Ahli (Wad Medani)	22	9	3	10	20	25	−5	30	
7	Amal Atbara	22	7	7	8	22	32	−10	28	
8	Al-Khartoum	22	6	6	10	23	37	−14	24	
9	Al-Hilal (Port Sudan)	22	6	4	12	25	32	−7	22	
10	Al-Ittihad (Wad Medani)	22	5	4	13	18	27	−9	19	
11	Al-Hilal (Kadougli)	22	4	6	12	19	43	−24	18	
12	Jazeerat Al-Feel (R)	22	2	4	16	17	47	−30	10	

Updated to match(es) played on November 17, 2008. Source: Goalzz.com
Rules for classification: 1) points; 2) goal difference; 3) number of goals scored.
(C) Champions; (R) Relegated

== Scorers ==
Rank	Scorer	Team	Goals
1	(Sudan) Haytham Tambal	Al-Merreikh	21
2	(Nigeria) Kelechi Osunwa	Al-Hilal Omdurman	16
3	(Sudan) Abdelhamid Ammari	Al-Merreikh	12
4	(Sudan) Muhannad Eltahir	Al-Hilal Omdurman	11
5	(Sudan) Faisal Agab	Al-Merreikh	10
6	3 players		6
9	5 players		5
14	4 players		4
18	20 players		3
38	21 players		2
59	42 players		1
Own goals			?
Total goals			?
Total games			?
Average per game			?

- Last updated November 17, 2008.
