= Omer Mohamed Bakhit =

Sudanese football midfielder

Omer Bakhit
Personal information
- Full name: Omer Mohamed Bakhit Ahmed
- Date of birth: November 24, 1984 (age 41)
- Place of birth: Khartoum, Khartoum state, Sudan
- Height: 1.71 m (5 ft 7 in)
- Position: Defensive midfielder

Senior career*
Years	Team	Apps	(Gls)
1999-2000	Al-Jeraif SC		
2001–2014	Al-Hilal Club	124	(8)
2015	Al Ahli SC (Khartoum)	0	(0)
2015–2016	Al-Merrikh SC	0	(0)
2017	Al-Ahly Shendi	0	(0)
2018–2020	Hay Al-Wadi SC (Nyala)	0	(0)

International career^{‡}
2003–2014	Sudan	57	(1)

Managerial career
- 2025: Al-Ahly SC (Merowe)
Medal record
Men's football
Representing Sudan
African Nations Championship
Third place	2011 Sudan
CECAFA Cup
Winner	2006 Ethiopia
Third place	2004 Ethiopia
Third place	2011 Tanzania
- * Club domestic league appearances and goals as of June 1, 2007 ‡ National team caps and goals as of 1 February 2024

Omer Mohamed Bakhit (born November 24, 1984, in Sudan) is a Sudanese football midfielder currently playing for Al-Hilal. He is a member of the Sudan national football team. He also plays as a left back or a defensive midfielder. He is very good in short and long passes

== Honours ==
Al-Hilal Club

- Sudan Premier League: 2003, 2004, 2005, 2006, 2007, 2009, 2010, 2012, 2014
- Sudan Cup: 2002, 2004, 2009, 2011

Al-Merrikh SC

- Sudan Premier League: 2015
- Sudan Cup: 2015

Al-Ahly Shendi

- Sudan Cup: 2017

Sudan

- African Nations Championship: 3rd place, 2011
- CECAFA Cup: 2006; 3rd place, 2004, 2011

== Internationalgoals ==
#	Date	Venue	Opponent	Score	Result	Competition
1.	18 December 2004	Addis Ababa, Ethiopia	Somalia	4-0	Won	2004 CECAFA Cup
