= 2007 Sudan Premier League =

National football league season

Sudan Premier League
- Season: 2007

The 2007 Sudan Premier League was the 36th edition of the highest club level football competition in Sudan.

== Final standings ==
Pos	Team	Pld	W	D	L	GF	GA	GD	Pts	Qualification or relegation
1	Hilal (Omdurman)	22	21	1	0	70	6	+64	64	Champions
2	Merreikh (Omdurman)	22	19	1	2	65	12	+53	58	
3	Mourada (Omdurman)	22	11	6	5	27	17	+10	39	
4	Ahli (Wad Medani)	22	10	3	9	30	28	+2	33	
5	Hay al-Arab (Port Sudan)	22	7	7	8	18	21	−3	28	
6	Khartoum-3 (Khartoum)	22	8	3	11	23	34	−11	27	
7	Amal (Atbara)	22	5	6	11	22	31	−9	21	
8	Hilal (Port Sudan)	22	5	6	11	14	33	−19	21	
9	Ittihad (Wad Medani)	22	5	6	11	18	36	−18	21	
10	Jazeerat (Al-Feel)	22	4	8	10	9	35	−26	20	
11	Merghani (Kassala)	22	3	8	11	11	30	−19	17	Relegated
12	Merreikh Al-Thagher	22	3	7	12	10	34	−24	16	Relegated

Source: rsssf.com

== Goal scorers ==
Goalscorers	Goals	Team
(Nigeria) Kelechi Osunwa	20	Al-Hilal (Omdurman)
(Sudan) Faisal Agab	16	Al-Merreikh
(Nigeria) Endurance Idahor	15	Al-Merreikh
(Sudan) Haytham Tambal	14	Al-Merreikh
(Nigeria) Godwoin Ndubuisi	13	Al-Hilal (Omdurman)
(Sudan) Saif Eldin Ali Idris Farah	9	Al-Hilal (Omdurman)
(Sudan) Abdelhamid Ammari	6	Al-Merreikh
(Sudan) Ahmed Adil	5	Al Khartoum 3
(Sudan) Yousef Alsine	5	Al-Mourada
(Sudan) Salih Abdullah	5	Al-Hilal (Omdurman)
