= Nizar Hamid =

Sudanese footballer

Personal information
- Full name: Nizar Hamid Nasir Koko
- Date of birth: 3 October 1988 (age 38)
- Place of birth: Kassala, Kassala State, Sudan
- Height: 1.80 m (5 ft 11 in)
- Position: Defensive midfielder

Team information
- Current team: Al-Mourada SC
- Number: 13

Senior career*
Years	Team	Apps	(Gls)
2007–2008	Al-Hadaf SC (Kassala)		
2009–2011	Alamal SC Atbara		
2012–2022	Al-Hilal Club		
2022-2024	Al Ahli SC (Khartoum)		
2024-2025	Al Mirghani ESC		
2025-2026	Al-Shurta SC (Abu Hemed)		
2026-	Al-Mourada SC		

International career
2009–2011	Sudan U 23	7	(2)
2010–	Sudan	39	(2)
Medal record
Men's football
Representing Sudan
CECAFA Cup
Third place	2011 Tanzania
- * Club domestic league appearances and goals

Nazir Hamid (born 3 October 1988) is a Sudanese football defender who plays for Al-Hilal and the Sudan national football team.

== International goals ==
As of match played 31 May 2016. Sudan score listed first, score column indicates score after each Hamid goal.

International goals by date, venue, cap, opponent, score, result and competition
No.	Date	Venue	Cap	Opponent	Score	Result	Competition
1	31 May 2016	Moi International Sports Centre Nairobi, Kenya	4	Kenya	1–0	1–0	Friendly
2	2 September 2016	Khartoum Stadium Khartoum, Khartoum State, Sudan	4	Gabon	1-2	1-2	Friendly

== Honours ==
Al-Hilal Club

- Sudan Premier League: 2012, 2014, 2016, 2017, 2020-21
- Sudan Cup: 2016

Sudan

- CECAFA Cup: 3rd place, 2011
