= 2015 Sudan Premier League =

Sudan Premier League
- Season: 2015
- Matches: 135
- Goals: 268 (1.99 per match)
- Biggest home win: Al Merreikh 5-0 Al Ahli Wad Madani (6 May 2015)
- Biggest away win: Al Merghani 0-4 Al Merreikh (26 April 2015); Al Nsor 0-4 Al Ahly Shandi (26 April 2015); Al Rabta Kosti 0-4 Al Merreikh (21 June 2015)
- Highest scoring: Merikh Kosti 2-3 Al Nsor (8 March 2015); Al Nsor 4-1 Al Ahli Khartoum (25 February 2015); Al Merreikh 5-0 Al Ahli Wad Madani (6 May 2015); Hilal Obayed 4-1 Al Ahli Wad Madani (15 June 2015); Khartoum 3-2 Al Ahli Wad Madani (25 June 2015)
- Longest winning run: Al Merreikh (5)
- Longest unbeaten run: Al Hilal (17)
- Longest winless run: Al Hilal Kadougli (11)
- Longest losing run: Al Merghani (5)

The 2015 Sudan Premier League is the 44th season of top-tier football in Sudan. The season began play on 26 January 2015. Al Hilal Omdurman are the defending champions, having won their 28th championship, more than the rest of the clubs in the league combined.

The league comprises 15 teams, the bottom three of which will be relegated to regional leagues for 2016, while the next lowest team will compete in a playoff with a regional league team for a spot in the 2016 Sudan Premier League.

== Teams ==
Locations of the 2014 Sudan Premier League teams

A total of 15 teams will contest the league, including 12 sides from the 2014 season and four promoted from the regional leagues as the Sudan Premier League expanded to 15 teams this season. The four newcomers from the regional leagues are Al Ahli Wad Medani, Al Merghani, Hilal Obayed and Merikh Kosti.

El-Ahli Atbara, Al Nil and Al Ittihad were the last three teams of the 2014 season and will play in the regional leagues for the 2015 season. Al Hilal Omdurman are the defending champions from the 2014 season.

=== Stadiums and locations ===
Team	Location	Stadium	Stadium capacity
Al Ahli Khartoum	Khartoum	Khartoum Stadium	23,000
Al Ahli Wad Madani	Wad Madani	Wad Madani Stadium	10,000
Al-Ahly Shendi	Shendi	Shendi Stadium	5,000
Al Hilal Kadougli	Kadougli	Kadougli Stadium	2,500
Al Hilal Omdurman	Omdurman	Al-Hilal Stadium	25,000
Al Mirghani ESC	Kassala	Stade Al-Merghani Kassala	11,000
Al-Merrikh SC	Omdurman	Al-Merrikh Stadium	43,645
Al-Nesoor SC	Khartoum	Khartoum Stadium	23,000
Al Rabita Kosti	Kosti	Kosti Stadium	3,000
Alamal SC Atbara	Atbarah	Stade Al-Amal Atbara	13,000
Hilal El-Fasher	Al-Fashir	El Fasher Stadium	10,000
Al-Hilal Al-Ubayyid	Al-Ubayyid		
Al Khartoum SC	Khartoum	Khartoum Stadium	23,000
Merikh Kosti	Kosti	Kosti Stadium	3,000
Merreikh El Fasher	Al-Fashir	El Fasher Stadium	10,000

== League table ==
Pos	Team	Pld	W	D	L	GF	GA	GD	Pts	Qualification or relegation
1	Al Merrikh Omdurman (C)	28	20	4	4	58	13	+45	64	Qualification for the Champions League
2	Al Hilal Omdurman	28	17	8	3	39	13	+26	59	Qualification for the Champions League
3	Al Ahly Shendi	28	15	8	5	39	21	+18	53	Qualification for the Confederation Cup (Note: Al Khartoum qualified for the Confederation Cup as the winners of the 2015 Sudan Cup (Al Merrikh Omdurman) qualified for the Champions League.)
4	Al Khartoum	28	13	11	4	41	24	+17	50	Qualification for the Confederation Cup
5	Al Merrikh Al Fasher	28	11	12	5	24	16	+8	45	
6	Al Hilal Al Obayed	28	11	8	9	29	23	+6	41	
7	Al Merrikh Kosti	28	9	9	10	26	30	−4	36	
8	Al Hilal Al Fasher	28	10	5	13	24	35	−11	35	
9	Al Ahli Wad Madani	28	8	10	10	23	29	−6	34	
10	Al Ahli Khartoum	28	7	7	14	26	39	−13	28	
11	Al Nesoor	28	5	13	10	30	40	−10	28	
12	Al Rabita (O)	28	6	8	14	21	34	−13	26	Qualification for the relegation play-off
13	Al Amal (R)	28	6	8	14	29	42	−13	26	Relegation to the Second Division
14	Al Hilal Kadougli (R)	28	7	5	16	23	44	−21	26	Relegation to the Second Division
15	Al Mirghani (R)	28	4	6	18	11	40	−29	18	Relegation to the Second Division

Source: Soccerway
Rules for classification: 1) points; 2) head-to-head points; 3) head-to-head goal difference; 4) head-to-head goal scored; 5) head-to-head away goal scored; 6) goal difference; 7) goal scored
(C) Champion; (O) Play-off winner; (R) Relegated

== Result table ==
Home \ Away	AAK	AWM	AAS	AHK	AHO	MRG	MRK	NSR	ARK	ALA	HEF	HAO	KHA	MKO	MEF
Al Ahli Khartoum			2–0		0–2	1–0	0–2			3–1	0–2	1–1	1–1	3–1	0–0
Al Ahli Wad Medani	2–1		2–0	1–0		1–0		0–0	0–0	2–1		0–0	0–0		1–1
Al Ahly Shendi	1–0				0–0	0–0	1–0		3–0		1–0	1–0	0–0	3–0	
Al Hilal Kadougli	2–1	1–0	1–1			0–0		1–1	1–0				0–2		0–1
Al Hilal Omdurman		2–0	0–0	1–0			0–0	2–0		3–0	2–0		1–0	1–1	
Al Merghani		0–2		2–1	1–3		0–4	0–0		2–2	2–0	0–0	0–2	0–1	
Al Merreikh	2–2	5–0		3–0				3–0	3–1	2–0				2–0	0–1
Al Nsoor	4–1	0–0	0–4	3–1		0–0			3–1			1–1	1–1		
Al Rabta Kosti	3–0		1–1	2–2	0–1	2–1	0–4			1–1		2–0	1–0		1–1
Alamal Atbara	1–0	1–0	1–3	3–0	1–2			2–2	1–1					0–0	2–2
Hilal El-Fasher	1–0	1–0		2–1			0–2	2–1		0–0					1–1
Hilal Obayed		4–1		3–0	0–0	1–0	0–1	1–0		3–1	1–0			2–1	
Khartoum 3		3–2			0–0	2–0	1–1		1–0	3–0	3–1	2–0		2–1	
Merikh Kosti		1–1		2–1			0–1	2–3	1–0	2–1	0–1		2–1		0–0
Merreikh El-Fasher	0–1		2–1		0–0	1–0					1–0	0–0	1–1	1–1	

Updated to match(es) played on 28 July 2015. Source: Soccerway
Legend: Blue = home team win; Yellow = draw; Red = away team win.
