= 2009 Sudan Premier League =

Sudan Premier League
- Season: 2009
- Promoted: Al-Shimali - 2008; Merghani Kassala -2008
- Relegated: Jazeerat Al-Feel - 2008
- 2010 CAF Champions League: Al-Hilal Omdurman; Al-Merreikh
- 2010 CAF Confederation Cup: Al-Khartoum; Amal Atbara
- Biggest home win: Al-Merreikh 6–1 Al-Shimali
- Biggest away win: Al-Hilal Omdurman 5–2 Al-Ahli (Wad Medani)

The 2009 Sudan Premier League was the 38th edition of the highest club level football competition in Sudan. The competition started on 18 February 2009 with a 1–1 draw between Al-Mourada and Merghani Kassala. For the 2009 season, the number of teams had been expanded from 12 to 13 teams. Al-Merreikh were the defending champions.

== Team information ==
Locations of teams in the Sudan Premier League 2009

Team	Head Coach	Venue	Capacity	City	State
Al-Ahli (Wad Medani)		Algazira Stadium	15,000	Wad Madani	Al Jazirah
Al-Hilal (Kadougli)	Bakri Abdulgalil	Kadugli Stadium	1,000	Kaduqli	South Kurdufan
Al-Hilal Omdurman	(Brazil) Dutra	AlHilal Stadium	45,000	Omdurman	Khartoum
Al-Hilal (Port Sudan)		Stade Port Sudan	7,000	Port Sudan	Red Sea
Al-Ittihad (Wad Medani)	(Egypt) Mahir Hamam	Stade Wad Medani	5,000	Wad Madani	Al Jazirah
Al-Merreikh	(Croatia) Rodion Gačanin	Al Merreikh Stadium	42,000	Omdurman	Khartoum
Al-Mourada	Borhan Tia	Stade de Omdurman	14,000	Omdurman	Khartoum
Al-Nil Al-Hasahesa	(Egypt) Gamal Abdallah	Al-Hasahesa Stadium	3,000	Al-Hasahesa	Al Jazirah
Amal Atbara		Stade Al-Amal Atbara	4,000	Atbara	River Nile
Hay al-Arab Port Sudan	(Egypt) Raeft Maki	Stade Port Sudan	7,000	Port Sudan	Red Sea
Al-Khartoum	Alfateh Alnager	Khartoum Stadium	33,500	Khartoum	Khartoum
Al Merghani Kassala	Mubarak Sulieman	Stade Al-Merghani Kassala	11,000	Kassala	Kassala
Al-Shimali		Atbara Stadium	15,000	Atbara	River Nile

Last updated: 6 April 2009

== Standings ==
The last game of the first round was on Saturday May 16 before the mid-season break, after which the league resumed play with the 14th week/round on July 19.

Pos	Team	Pld	W	D	L	GF	GA	GD	Pts	Qualification or relegation
1	Al-Hilal Omdurman (C)	24	22	1	1	60	8	+52	67	2010 CAF Champions League
2	Al-Merreikh	24	18	6	0	64	16	+48	60	2010 CAF Champions League
3	Al-Khartoum	24	9	9	6	28	27	+1	36	2010 CAF Confederation Cup
4	Amal Atbara	24	9	8	7	29	29	0	35	2010 CAF Confederation Cup
5	Al-Nil Al-Hasahesa	24	9	5	10	26	22	+4	32	
6	Al-Ahli (Wad Medani)	24	7	10	7	29	31	−2	31	
7	Al-Mourada	24	7	8	9	29	29	0	29	
8	Merghani Kassala	24	7	7	10	26	31	−5	28	
9	Al-Hilal (Port Sudan)	24	7	6	11	25	43	−18	27	
10	Hay al-Arab Port Sudan	24	6	8	10	27	32	−5	26	
11	Al-Hilal (Kadougli)	24	5	7	12	27	41	−14	22	
12	Al-Ittihad (Wad Medani)	24	5	7	12	24	49	−25	22	Relegation
13	Al-Shimali (R)	24	3	2	19	13	49	−36	11 (Note: Al-Shimali's home win over Al-Hilal (Port Sudan) was annulled by the league. Match was awarded to Al-Hilal (Port Sudan) as 2-0 winners.)	Relegation

Updated to match(es) played on 19 August 2009 - week #20. Source: Goalzz.com
Rules for classification: 1) points; 2) goal difference; 3) number of goals scored.
(C) Champions; (R) Relegated

=== Positions by round ===
Team ╲ Round	1	2	3	4	5	6	7	8	9	10	11	12	13	14	15	16	17	18	19	20	21	22	23	24
Al-Ahli (Wad Medani)	13	13	13	13	12	13	13	12	11	11	10	10	10	11	11	12	12	12	12	12				6
Al-Hilal (Kadougli)	10	5	6	9	7	6	6	8	10	10	9	9	11	10	10	9	9	10	11	11				11
Al-Hilal Omdurman	2	6	7	4	2	2	1	1	1	1	1	1	1	1	1	1	1	1	1	1				1
Al-Hilal (Port Sudan)	4	1	2	2	4	9	5	7	6	5	6	6	5	5	5	6	6	7	8	6				9
Al-Ittihad (Wad Medani)	3	7	3	6	10	11	11	11	12	12	12	11	12	12	12	11	11	11	10	10				12
Al-Khartoum	8	8	5	3	1	3	4	4	4	4	4	4	4	4	3	3	3	3	3	3				3
Al-Merreikh	1	2	4	7	5	4	2	2	2	2	2	2	2	2	2	2	2	2	2	2				2
Al-Mourada	5	9	9	10	8	8	10	6	8	6	7	7	7	8	8	5	7	5	5	7				7
Al-Nil Al-Hasahesa	6	3	1	1	3	1	3	3	3	3	3	3	3	3	4	4	4	4	4	4				5
Al-Shimali	12	12	12	12	13	12	12	13	13	13	13	13	13	13	13	13	13	13	13	13				13
Amal Atbara	9	10	10	11	11	10	8	10	5	8	5	5	6	7	6	7	8	8	6	5				4
Hay al-Arab Port Sudan	11	11	11	5	9	7	9	5	7	9	11	12	8	9	9	10	10	9	9	9				10
Merghani Kassala	7	4	8	8	6	5	7	9	9	7	8	8	9	6	7	8	5	6	7	8				8

Source: goalzz.com
= 1st place; = 2nd place; = 3rd place

== Results ==
Home \ Away	AWM	HLK	HIL	HLP	IWM	KRT	MRK	MRD	NHS	SHM	AMA	HRB	MRG
Al-Ahli (Wad Medani)			2–5	0–0	0–0	2–1	0–0	2–4			1–1	1–0	1–0
Al-Hilal (Kadougli)	1–1		0–5	0–2	4–0		2–2	0–0	1–0	2–0	2–3	3–0	1–2
Al-Hilal Omdurman	2–0			5–0	3–0	2–0	1–1	4–0	1–0	2–0	5–1		2–0
Al-Hilal (Port Sudan)	4–1	4–3			2–2	1–1	0–2		1–0	0–1	3–2	0–4	
Al-Ittihad (Wad Medani)		2–2	1–4			2–0	0–2	1–0		3–2		1–0	2–1
Al-Khartoum		3–0	0–3		2–0			3–2	1–1	1–0	1–0	4–0	1–0
Al-Merreikh	3–0	4–0				4–0		3–1	3–1	6–1	3–2	3–1	4–0
Al-Mourada	2–2	1–1		4–0	2–1	0–0	1–3			4–0		2–1	0–0
Al-Nil Al-Hasahesa	1–0	2–0		1–0	1–1	2–0	0–1	1–0		3–0			2–1
Al-Shimali	1–1		0–1	0–2 (Note: Al-Shimali won the match 1-0, however it was penalized for playing a banned player; Al-Hilal Port Sudan was awarded the match as 2-0 winners.)	2–1	0–0			2–1		0–2		1–3
Amal Atbara	1–0	1–0			1–0	1–1	1–1	1–1	1–0			0–1	0–0
Hay al-Arab Port Sudan	0–0	0–0	0–2	0–0	4–0			2–1	0–0	2–1	2–2		0–2
Merghani Kassala				1–1		1–2		1–1	1–1	3–0	1–1	2–0	

Updated to match(es) played on 19 August 2009 - Week #20. Source: rsssf.com
Legend: Blue = home team win; Yellow = draw; Red = away team win.

== Season statistics ==
=== Goals ===
- Most goals scored by a player in a single game, 4:
  - Ez alden Alhamri (Al-Hilal (Port Sudan)), home game against Al-Hilal (Kadougli) on February 18
  - Abdelhamid Ammari (Al-Merreikh), home game against Al-Shimali on May 16
- 262 goals scored through 6 August 2009 - Week #18

=== Wins ===
- Biggest home win:
  - Al-Merreikh 6–1 Al-Shimali
- Biggest away win:
  - Al-Hilal Omdurman 5–2 Al-Ahli (Wad Medani)

== Top scorers ==
Rank	Scorer	Team	Goals
1	(Nigeria) Kelechi Osunwa	Al-Merreikh	21
2	(Sudan) Mudathir El Tahir	Al-Hilal Omdurman	20
3	(Nigeria) Endurance Idahor	Al-Merreikh	11
4	(Sudan) Muhannad Eltahir	Al-Hilal Omdurman	10
5	(Sudan) Sayed Gadrin	Al-Ahli (Wad Medani)	9
5	(Sudan) Mohammed Osman Hanno	Al-Mourada	9
7	(Sudan) Ahmed Saa'd	Al-Hilal (Port Sudan)	8
