= Haitham Mustafa =

Sudanese footballer

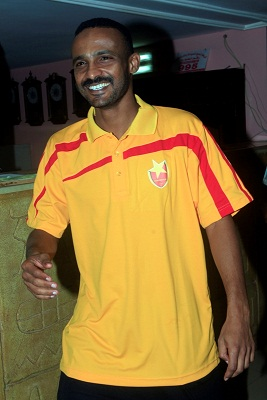
- Mustafa in 2013

Personal information
- Full name: Haitham Mustafa Karar Ahmed
- Date of birth: 19 July 1977 (age 49)
- Place of birth: Khartoum Bahri, Khartoum State, Sudan
- Height: 1.74 m (5 ft 8 1/2 in)
- Position: Attacking midfielder

Senior career*
Years	Team	Apps	(Gls)
1993-1995	Al-Amir SC (Bahri)	17	(2)
1996–2012	Al-Hilal Club	578	(57)
2013–2014	Al-Merrikh SC		
2015	Al-Ahly Shendi		

International career^{‡}
1998–2012	Sudan	99	(6)

Managerial career
- 2016: Al-Hilal Club U20
- 2017: Al Ahli SC (Khartoum)
- 2018: Alamal SC Atbara
- 2019: Al-Hilal Club assist
- 2019: Al-Hilal Club
- 2019-2020: Al-Falah SC
Medal record
Men's football
Representing Sudan
African Nations Championship
Third place	2011 Sudan
CECAFA Cup
Winner	2006 Ethiopia
Third place	2004 Ethiopia
- * Club domestic league appearances and goals ‡ National team caps and goals as of June 24, 2024

Haitham Mostafa Karar (Arabic: هيثم مصطفي كرار; born 19 July 1977) is a Sudanese former footballer who played as midfielder. He was the captain of Al-Hilal Omdurman and the Sudan national team.

== Club career ==
He joined Al-Hilal in November 1995 after transferring from Al-Ameer Al-Bahrawi, a second league team. He was one of the most promising players of Africa at that time. He was on the verge to going to Everton in the transfer window in 2011, but it was declined.

== International career ==
He led the Sudanese national team to qualify for the 2008 African Cup of Nations, which was the first time for the national team to qualify in over 30 years.

== Honours ==
=== Clubs ===
Al-Hilal Club

- Sudan Premier League: 1996, 1998, 1999, 2003, 2004, 2005, 2006, 2007, 2009, 2010, 2012
- Sudan Cup: 1998, 2000, 2002, 2004, 2009, 2011

Al-Merrikh SC

- Sudan Premier League: 2013
- Sudan Cup: 2013, 2014
- CECAFA Clubs Cup: 2014

Sudan

- African Nations Championship: 3rd place, 2011
- CECAFA Cup: 2006; 3rd place 2004

== Career statistics ==
=== International goals ===
#	Date	Venue	Opponent	Score	Result	Competition
1.	25 December 2002	Kuwait, Kuwait	Morocco	1-0	Won	2002 Arab Cup
2.	19 September 2003	Sanaa, Yemen	Yemen	2-1	Won	Friendly
3.	12 December 2004	Addis Ababa, Ethiopia	Kenya	2-2	Draw	2004 CECAFA Cup
4.	18 December 2004	Addis Ababa, Ethiopia	Somalia	4-0	Won	2004 CECAFA Cup
5.	22 December 2004	Addis Ababa, Ethiopia	Burundi	1-2	Lost	2004 CECAFA Cup
6.	21 December 2006	Beirut, Lubnan	Somalia	6-1	Won	2009 Arab Nations Cup qualification
7.	3 May 2008	Omdurman, Sudan	Rwanda	4-0	Won	2009 African Nations Championship qualification
8.	16 January 2011	Cairo, Egypt	Tanzania	2-0	Won	2011 Nile Basin Tournament

== Trivia ==
Mustafa is one of Sudan's footballing legends. He is a highly rated player. In his youth years Haitham Mustafa was regarded as a highly talented holding midfielder.

He is a Goodwill Ambassador of the United Nations.
