= 2011 Sudan Premier League =

Sudan Premier League
- Season: 2011
- Champions: Al-Merrikh

The 2011 Sudan Premier League was the 40th edition of the highest club level football competition in Sudan. Al-Merrikh SC took out the championship.

== Standings ==
Pos	Team	Pld	W	D	L	GF	GA	GD	Pts	Qualification or relegation
1	Al-Merrikh (Omdurman) (C)	26	24	1	1	69	10	+59	73	2012 CAF Champions League
2	Al-Hilal (Omdurman)	26	22	2	2	72	12	+60	68	2012 CAF Champions League
3	Alamal SC Atbara (Atbara)	26	12	6	8	28	30	−2	42	2012 CAF Confederation Cup
4	Al-Ahli (Shandi)	26	10	7	9	31	27	+4	37	2012 CAF Confederation Cup
5	Al Khartoum SC (Khartoum)	26	11	4	11	30	34	−4	37	
6	Al-Hilal (Kaduqli)	26	9	6	11	32	44	−12	33	
7	Al-Ahli (Khartoum)	26	8	7	11	29	33	−4	31	
8	Al-Nsoor (Khartoum)	26	8	7	11	16	26	−10	31	
9	Al-Mourada SC (Omdurman)	26	7	7	12	26	35	−9	28	
10	Al-Nil Al-Hasahesa (Hasahisa)	26	7	7	12	24	33	−9	28	
11	Al-Hilal (Port Sudan)	26	8	4	14	21	42	−21	28	
12	Jazeerat Al-Feel SC (Al-Feel)	26	5	11	10	22	40	−18	26	
13	Al-Ittihad (Wad Medani) (R)	26	6	8	12	20	31	−11	26	
14	Hay al-Arab (Omdurman) (R)	26	4	5	17	18	41	−23	17	

Updated to match(es) played on end of season. Source: RSSSF.com
Rules for classification: 1) points; 2) goal difference; 3) number of goals scored.
(C) Champions; (R) Relegated
