= 2010 Sudan Premier League =

Sudan Premier League
- Season: 2010
- Champions: Al-Hilal Club (Omdurman)
- Relegated: Al-Ahli (Wad Medani); Merghani Kassala
- 2011 CAF Champions League: Al-Hilal Omdurman; Al-Merreikh
- 2011 CAF Confederation Cup: Al-Khartoum; Al-Nil Al-Hasahesa
- Matches played: 182
- Goals scored: 441 (2.42 per match)

The 2010 Sudan Premier League was the 39th edition of the highest club level football competition in Sudan. The competition started on 2010-02-20. For the 2010 season, the number of teams has been expanded from 13 to 14 teams. Al-Hilal Omdurman are the defending champions.

== Team information ==
Locations of teams in the Sudan Premier League 2009

Team	Head Coach	Venue	Capacity	City	State
Al-Ahli (Wad Medani)		Algazira Stadium	15,000	Wad Madani	Al Jazirah
Al-Hilal (Kadougli)	Bakri Abdulgalil	Kadugli Stadium	1,000	Kaduqli	South Kurdufan
Al-Hilal Omdurman	(Serbia) Mesho	AlHilal Stadium	45,000	Omdurman	Khartoum
Al-Hilal (Port Sudan)		Stade Port Sudan	7,000	Port Sudan	Red Sea
Al-Ittihad (Wad Medani)	(Egypt) Mahir Hamam	Stade Wad Medani	5,000	Wad Madani	Al Jazirah
Al-Merreikh	(Croatia) Rodion Gačanin	Al Merreikh Stadium	42,000	Omdurman	Khartoum
Al-Mourada	Borhan Tia	Stade de Omdurman	14,000	Omdurman	Khartoum
Al-Nil Al-Hasahesa	(Egypt) Gamal Abdallah	Al-Hasahesa Stadium	3,000	Al-Hasahesa	Al Jazirah
Amal Atbara		Stade Al-Amal Atbara	4,000	Atbara	River Nile
Hay al-Arab Port Sudan	(Egypt) Raeft Maki	Stade Port Sudan	7,000	Port Sudan	Red Sea
Al-Khartoum	Alfateh Alnager	Khartoum Stadium	33,500	Khartoum	Khartoum
Al Merghani Kassala	Mubarak Sulieman	Stade Al-Merghani Kassala	11,000	Kassala	Kassala

== Standings ==
The last game of the first round is on Saturday May 16 before the mid-season break, after which the league resumed play with the 14th week/round on July 19.

Pos	Team	Pld	W	D	L	GF	GA	GD	Pts	Qualification or relegation
1	Al-Hilal (C)	26	23	1	2	70	13	+57	70	2011 CAF Champions League
2	Al-Merreikh	26	22	1	3	65	19	+46	67	2011 CAF Champions League
3	Al-Khartoum	26	10	10	6	33	31	+2	40	2011 CAF Confederation Cup
4	Al-Nil Al-Hasahesa	26	11	6	9	36	32	+4	39	2011 CAF Confederation Cup
5	Al-Mourada	26	7	11	8	26	35	−9	32	
6	Jazeerat Al-Feel	26	8	7	11	28	30	−2	31	
7	Hay al-Arab Port Sudan	26	7	10	9	28	34	−6	31	
8	Al-Hilal (Port Sudan)	26	7	9	10	23	24	−1	30	
9	Al-Hilal (Kadougli)	26	8	6	12	19	32	−13	30	
10	Amal Atbara	26	7	7	12	28	34	−6	28	
11	Al-Ahli Khartoum	26	6	9	11	28	46	−18	27	
12	Al-Ittihad (Wad Medani)	26	7	5	14	14	34	−20	26	
13	Al-Ahli (Wad Medani) (R)	26	4	11	11	20	30	−10	23	
14	Merghani Kassala (R)	26	6	5	15	23	47	−24	23	

Updated to match(es) played on end of season. Source: Goalzz.com
Rules for classification: 1) points; 2) goal difference; 3) number of goals scored.
(C) Champions; (R) Relegated
