= Waleed Al-Shoala =

Sudanese footballer (born 1998)

Personal information
- Full name: Waleed Bakhit Hamed Adam
- Date of birth: 11 November 1998 (age 28)
- Place of birth: Omdurman, Sudan
- Height: 1.75 m (5 ft 9 in)
- Position: Forward

Team information
- Current team: Hilal Alsahil SC
- Number: 11

Senior career*
Years	Team	Apps	(Gls)
2010-2014	Al-Shoala SC (Bahri)		
2014–2015	Al Ahli SC (Khartoum)		(2)
2015–2022	Al-Hilal Club		(41)
2022	Al-Arabi		(0)
2022–2023	Al-Hilal Club		(21)
2023-2024	Al-Nahda		
2024-2025	Al-Borouq SC (Al-Abraq)		
2025-	Hilal Alsahil SC		

International career^{‡}
2015–	Sudan	16	(3)
- * Club domestic league appearances and goals as of 11 April 2023 ‡ National team caps and goals as of 20 June 2023

Waleed Bakhit Hamed Adam (Arabic: وليد بخيت حامد آدم; born 11 November 1998), also known as Waleed Al-Shoala (Arabic: الشعلة), is a Sudanese professional footballer who plays as a forward for Saudi club Al-Nahda and the Sudan national team.

== Career statistics ==
As of match played on 11 April 2023

Appearances and goals by club, season and competition
Club	Season	League			National Cup		CAF Confederation Cup		CAF Champions League		Arab Club Champions Cup		Total	
Club	Season	Division	Apps	Goals	Apps	Goals	Apps	Goals	Apps	Goals	Apps	Goals	Apps	Goals
Al-Hilal Club (Omdurman)	2015	Sudan Premier League		2			—				—			
Al-Hilal Club (Omdurman)	2016	Sudan Premier League		1			—				—			
Al-Hilal Club (Omdurman)	2017	Sudan Premier League		0			—				—			
Al-Hilal Club (Omdurman)	2018	Sudan Premier League		16			—				—			
Al-Hilal Club (Omdurman)	2018-19	Sudan Premier League		8			8	7	4	0	—			
Al-Hilal Club (Omdurman)	2019-20	Sudan Premier League		6			—		6	1	2	2		
Al-Hilal Club (Omdurman)	2020-21	Sudan Premier League		8			—		5	1	—			
Al-Hilal Club (Omdurman)	2021-22	Sudan Premier League		13			—		1	0	—			
Al-Hilal Club (Omdurman)	2022-23	Sudan Premier League		8			—		1	0	0	0		
Al-Hilal Club (Omdurman)	Total			62			8	7	15	2	2	2		
Career total				62			8	7	15	2	2	2		

=== International ===
As of match played 1 January 2023

Appearances and goals by national team and year
National team	Year	Apps	Goals
Sudan	2015	1	0
Sudan	2018	1	0
Sudan	2019	3	0
Sudan	2020	1	0
Sudan	2021	4	0
Sudan	2022	9	3
Sudan	2023	5	0
Total		24	3
