= Ramadan Agab =

Sudanese professional footballer

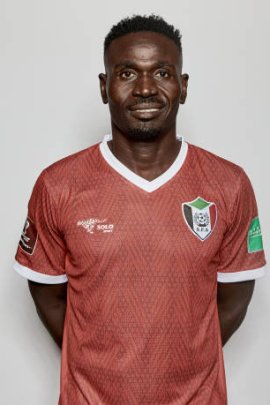

Personal information
- Full name: Ramadan Agab Shareif Ferein
- Date of birth: 19 September 1989 (age 37)
- Place of birth: Juba, Sudan
- Height: 1.70 m (5 ft 7 in)
- Position: Midfielder

Team information
- Current team: Al-Merrikh SC
- Number: 29

Senior career*
Years	Team	Apps	(Gls)
2005–2006	Al-Nesoor SC		
2007–2008	Wad Noubawi SC		
2009–2012	Al-Mourada SC	45	(7)
2013–	Al-Merrikh SC		

International career^{‡}
2009–2011	Sudan U23	7	(1)
2010–	Sudan	66	(7)
Medal record
Men's football
Representing Sudan
CECAFA Cup
Third place	2011 Tanzania
- * Club domestic league appearances and goals as of 20 January 2012 ‡ National team caps and goals as of 25 March 2025

Ramadan Agab Shareif Ferien (Arabic: رمضان عجب; born 19 September 1989) is a Sudanese professional footballer who plays as a striker for Al-Merrikh SC.

== International career ==
=== International goals ===
Scores and results list Sudan's goal tally first.

No.	Date	Venue	Opponent	Score	Result	Competition
1.	4 September 2011	Stade de la Revolution, Brazzaville, Congo	Congo	1–1	0–1	2012 Africa Cup of Nations qualification
2.	8 December 2011	National Stadium, Dar es Salaam, Tanzania	Rwanda	1–1	1–2	2011 CECAFA Cup
3.	14 June 2015	Khartoum Stadium, Khartoum, Sudan	Sierra Leone	1–0	1–0	2017 Africa Cup of Nations qualification
4.	5 September 2019	Stade Omnisports Idriss Mahamat Ouya, N'Djamena, Chad	Chad	1–0	3–1	2022 FIFA World Cup qualification
5.	5 September 2019	Stade Omnisports Idriss Mahamat Ouya, N'Djamena, Chad	Chad	2–0	3–1	2022 FIFA World Cup qualification
6.	5 September 2019	Stade Omnisports Idriss Mahamat Ouya, N'Djamena, Chad	Chad	3–0	3–1	2022 FIFA World Cup qualification
7.	13 November 2019	Al-Hilal Stadium, Omdurman, Sudan	São Tomé and Príncipe	1–0	4–0	2021 Africa Cup of Nations qualification
8.	14 March 2024	Faisal Stadium, Al-Taef, KSA	Bangladesh	1-0	3–0	Friendly

== Honours ==
Al-Merrikh

- Sudan Premier League: 2013, 2015, 2018, 2018–19, 2019–20
- Sudan Cup: 2013, 2014, 2015, 2018

Sudan

- CECAFA Cup: 3rd place, 2011
