= 2020–21 Sudan Premier League =

Sudan Premier League
- Season: 2020–21
- Dates: 27 December 2020 – 23 August 2021
- Champions: Al-Hilal
- Champions League: Al-Hilal; Al-Merrikh
- Confederation Cup: Hay Al-Wadi; Hay Al-Arab

The 2020–21 Sudan Premier League was the 50th season of the Sudan Premier League, the top-tier football league in Sudan. The season started on 27 December 2020 and ended on 23 August 2021.

== Stadiums and locations ==
Team	Location	Stadium	Capacity
Al-Ahli Khartoum	Khartoum	Khartoum Stadium	23,000
Al-Ahli Merowe	Merowe	Merowe Stadium	1,000
Al-Ahly Shendi	Shendi	Shandi Stadium	5,000
Al-Amal Atbara	Atbara	Atbara Stadium	13,000
Al Hilal Al Fasher	Al-Fashir	Al-Fasher Stadium	10,000
Hay Al-Arab	Khartoum	Family Club Stadium	1,000
Hay Al-Wadi	Rabak	Rabak Stadium	8,000
Hilal Alsahil SC	Port Sudan	Port Sudan Stadium	7,000
Al-Hilal	Omdurman	Al-Hilal Stadium	25,000
Al-Hilal Kadougli	Kadougli	Murta Stadium	10,000
Al-Hilal Al-Ubayyid	El-Obeid	Al-Ubayyid Stadium	30,000
Khartoum	Khartoum	Khartoum Stadium	23,000
Al-Merrikh	Omdurman	Al-Merreikh Stadium	43,645
Al-Merreikh Al-Fasher	Al-Fashir	Al-Fasher Stadium	10,000
Al-Merreikh Al-Fasher	Al-Fashir	Alnagea Stadium	5,000
Al-Shorta El-Gadarif	El-Gadarif	El-Gadarif Stadium	15,000
Al-Shorta El-Gadarif	Omdurman	Dar Alryada Omdurman Stadium	5,000
Tuti SC	Khartoum	Khartoum Stadium	23,000

== League table ==
Pos	Team	Pld	W	D	L	GF	GA	GD	Pts	Qualification or relegation
1	Al-Hilal (C)	30	25	4	1	75	10	+65	79	Qualification for the Champions League
2	Al-Merrikh	30	20	8	2	50	16	+34	68	Qualification for the Champions League
3	Hay Al-Wadi	30	12	11	7	35	25	+10	47	Qualification for the Confederation Cup
4	Hay Al-Arab	30	11	9	10	26	32	−6	42	Qualification for the Confederation Cup
5	Khartoum	30	11	8	11	34	34	0	41	
6	Al-Hilal Al-Ubayyid	30	10	11	9	25	32	−7	41	
7	Al-Amal Atbara	30	10	9	11	25	29	−4	39	
8	Al-Ahli Merowe	30	9	11	10	24	28	−4	38	
9	Al Hilal Al Fasher	30	10	8	12	35	41	−6	38	
10	Hilal Alsahil SC	30	10	5	15	27	33	−6	35	
11	Al-Shorta El-Gadarif	30	8	11	11	26	36	−10	35	
12	Al-Ahly Shendi	30	9	7	14	21	27	−6	34	
13	Tuti SC	30	8	9	13	24	39	−15	33	
14	Al-Ahli Khartoum	30	7	11	12	17	28	−11	32	
15	Al-Hilal Kadougli (R)	30	5	10	15	22	39	−17	25	Relegation
16	Al-Merreikh Al-Fasher (R)	30	6	6	18	15	32	−17	24	Relegation

Updated to match(es) played on unknown. Source:
Rules for classification: 1) Points; 2) Goal difference; 3) Goals scored.
(C) Champions; (R) Relegated
