= Saif Eldin Ali Masawi =

Sudanese footballer

Seif Mesawi
Personal information
- Full name: Seifeldin Ali Edris Farah
- Date of birth: 30 November 1979 (age 46)
- Place of birth: Khartoum, Khartoum State, Sudan
- Height: 1.83 m (6 ft 0 in)
- Position: Midfielder

Senior career*
Years	Team	Apps	(Gls)
2000–2006	Al-Jerif SC (Khartoum)		
2006–2016	Al-Hilal Club	88	
2017–2018	Al-Ahly Shendi		
2018–2020	Al-Hilal SC (Kadougli)		

International career^{‡}
2007–2015	Sudan	58	(4)
Medal record
Men's football
Representing Sudan
African Nations Championship
Third place	2011 Sudan
CECAFA Cup
Winner	2007 Tanzania
Third place	2011 Tanzania
- * Club domestic league appearances and goals as of 26 June 2024 ‡ National team caps and goals as of 26 June 2026

Seifeldin Ali Edris Farah (born 30 November 1979) is a Sudanese footballer who plays for Al-Hilal FC in the Sudan Premier League. He is the member of the Sudan National Football Team. He plays as a defensive midfielder. He is known for his hair having white colour in front.

== Internationalgoals ==
#	Date	Venue	Opponent	Score	Result	Competition
1.	19 December 2007	Dar es Salaam, Tanzania	Burundi	2-1	Won	2007 CECAFA Cup
2.	2 May 2008	Khartoum, Sudan	Rwanda	4-0	Won	2009 African Nations Championship qualification
3.	17 May 2008	Kigali, Rwanda	Rwanda	1-1	Draw	2009 African Nations Championship qualification
4.	22 May 2008	Sanaa, Yemen	Yemen	1-1	Draw	Friendly
5.	10 September 2008	Cairo, Egypt	Chad	3-1	Won	2010 FIFA World Cup qualification
6.	2 December 2008	Dar es Salaam, Tanzania	Tanzania	1-3	Lost	2009 African Nations Championship qualification
7.	22 February 2011	Khartoum, Sudan	Angola	1-1	Draw	2011 African Nations Championship
8.	2 June 2012	Khartoum, Sudan	Zambia	2-0 (0-3)	Lost	2014 FIFA World Cup qualification

== Honours ==
Al-Hilal

- Sudan Premier League: 2006, 2007, 2009, 2010, 2012, 2014, 2016
- Sudan Cup:2009, 2011, 2016

Al-Ahly Shendi

- Sudan Cup: 2017

Sudan

- African Nations Championship: 3rd place, 2011
- CECAFA Cup: 2007; 3rd place, 2011
