= Amir Kamal =

Sudanese footballer

Personal information
- Full name: Amir Kamal Suliman Mohamed
- Date of birth: 24 July 1992 (age 34)
- Place of birth: Khartoum, Khartoum State, Sudan
- Height: 1.78 m (5 ft 10 in)
- Position: Centre back

Team information
- Current team: Al-Merrikh SC
- Number: 21

Senior career*
Years	Team	Apps	(Gls)
2006–2007	Al-Aushara SC (Khartoum)		
2008–2011	Al-Mourada SC		
2012–	Al-Merrikh SC		

International career^{‡}
2010–	Sudan	63	(2)
Medal record
Men's football
Representing Sudan
CECAFA Cup
Third place	2011 Tanzania
- * Club domestic league appearances and goals as of 01:22, 2 December 2014 (UTC) ‡ National team caps and goals as of 11:53, 13 March 2025 (UTC)

Amir Kamal Suliman Mohamed (Arabic: أَمِير كَمَال سُلَيْمَان مُحَمَّد; born 24 July 1992) is a Sudanese professional footballer who currently plays as a defender for Al-Merrikh SC.

== Career statistics ==
=== International ===
As of match played 13 March 2025

Appearances and goals by national team and year
National team	Year	Apps	Goals
Norway	2010	3	0
Norway	2011	8	0
Norway	2012	7	0
Norway	2013	13	0
Norway	2014	7	0
Norway	2015	3	0
Norway	2016	4	0
Norway	2017	–	
Norway	2018	2	0
Norway	2019	6	1
Norway	2020	6	0
Norway	2021	12	1
Norway	2022	–	
Norway	2023	–	
Norway	2024	–	
Norway	2025	1	0
Total		72	2

Scores and results list Sudan's goal tally first, score column indicates score after each Kamal goal.

List of international goals scored by Amir Kamal
No.	Date	Venue	Opponent	Score	Result	Competition
1	18 October 2019	Al-Merrikh Stadium, Omdurman, Sudan	Tanzania	1–0	1–2	2020 African Nations Championship qualification
2	9 October 2021	Stade Adrar, Agadir, Morocco	Guinea	2–2	2–2	2022 FIFA World Cup qualification

== Honours ==
Al-Merrikh SC

- Sudan Premier League :2013, 2015, 2018, 2018-19, 2019-20
- Sudan Cup: 2012, 2013, 2014, 2015, 2018

Sudan

- CECAFA Cup: 3rd place, 2011
