= Mudather El Tahir =

Sudanese footballer (born 1988)

Mudather Karika
Personal information
- Full name: Mudather Altayeb Ebrahim Altaher
- Date of birth: 23 July 1986 (age 40)
- Place of birth: Khartoum, Khartoum State, Sudan
- Height: 1.82 m (6 ft 0 in)
- Positions: Striker; second striker

Senior career*
Years	Team	Apps	(Gls)
2003–2004	Al Taj SC (Omdurman)		
2005	Al-Hilal Club		
2006–2008	Al-Nil Al-Hasahesa	37	(10)
2009–2018	Al-Hilal Club	62	(47)
2018–2019	El-Hilal SC El-Obeid	0	(0)
2019-2021	Tuti SC (Khartoum)		
2021-2022	Al-Nasr SC (Ghebish)		
2022-2025	Al-Zamala SC (Umrawaba)		

International career^{‡}
2007–2008	Sudan U23	8	(1)
2007–2016	Sudan	55	(10)
Medal record
Men's football
Representing Sudan
African Nations Championship
Third place	2011 Sudan
CECAFA Cup
Winner	2007 Tanzania
- * Club domestic league appearances and goals as of 1 January 2010 ‡ National team caps and goals as of 24 June 2024

Mudather Altayeb Ebrahim Altaher (Arabic: مدثر الطيب إبراهيم الطاهر; born 23 July 1988), known as Mudather Karika, is a Sudanese striker who plays for Al-Zamala SC (Umrawaba) in the Umrawaba League.

== Career ==
During the 2012 Africa Cup of Nations he scored twice to put Sudan through to the quarter-finals.

== International ==
=== International goals ===
Scores and results list Sudan's goal tally first.

No	Date	Venue	Opponent	Score	Result	Competition
1.	22 December 2007	National Stadium (Tanzania), Dar es Salaam, Tanzania	Rwanda	1-2	2-2	2007 CECAFA Cup
2,3	20 August 2008	Al-Merrikh Stadium, Omdurman, Sudan	Egypt	2-4	4-0	Friendly
4.	28 March 2009	Al-Merrikh Stadium, Omdurman, Sudan	Mali	1–1	1–1	2010 FIFA World Cup qualification
5.	20 June 2010	Al-Merrikh Stadium Omdurman, Sudan	Tunisia	1-1	2-6	Friendly
6.	4 September 2010	Khartoum Stadium, Khartoum, Sudan	Congo	1–0	2–0	2012 Africa Cup of Nations qualification
7.	4 February 2011	Khartoum Stadium, Khartoum, Sudan	Gabon	1-0	1-0	2011 African Nations Championship
8.	8 February 2011	Khartoum Stadium, Khartoum, Sudan	Uganda	1-0	1-0	2011 African Nations Championship
9.	25 February 2011	Khartoum Stadium, Khartoum, Sudan	Algeria	1-0	1-0	2011 African Nations Championship
10.	30 January 2012	Estadio de Bata, Bata, Equatorial Guinea	Burkina Faso	1–0	2–1	2012 Africa Cup of Nations
11.	30 January 2012	Estadio de Bata, Bata, Equatorial Guinea	Burkina Faso	2–0	2–1	2012 Africa Cup of Nations
12.	8 September 2012	Khartoum Stadium, Khartoum, Sudan	Ethiopia	1–0	5–3	2013 Africa Cup of Nations qualification
13.	7 June 2013	Al-Merrikh Stadium, Omdurman, Sudan	Ghana	1–1	1–3	2014 FIFA World Cup qualification

== Honours ==
Al-Hilal Club

- Sudan Premier League: 2005, 2009, 2010, 2012, 2014, 2016, 2017
- Sudan Cup: 2009, 2011, 2016

Sudan

- African Nations Championship: 3rd place, 2011
- CECAFA Cup: 2007
