= 2013 Sudan Premier League =

42nd edition of football competition in Sudan

Sudan Premier League
- Season: 2013
- Champions: on-going
- Highest attendance: Al-Merrikh, 35,000

The 2013 Sudan Premier League is the 42nd edition of the highest club level football competition in Sudan. Al-Hilal are defending champions.

== Standings ==
Pos	Team	Pld	W	D	L	GF	GA	GD	Pts	Qualification or relegation
1	Al-Merrikh (C)	26	20	3	3	51	17	+34	63	Qualification for the Champions League
2	Al-Hilal (Omdurman)	26	18	7	1	58	17	+41	61	Qualification for the Champions League
3	Al-Ahly Shendi	26	15	6	5	37	16	+21	51	Qualification for the Confederation Cup
4	Al-Ahli Atbara	26	11	6	9	29	27	+2	39	Qualification for the Confederation Cup
5	Khartoum	26	10	8	8	25	22	+3	38	
6	Al-Merreikh Al-Fasher	26	9	9	8	26	33	−7	36	
7	Al-Ahli Khartoum	26	9	8	9	19	21	−2	35	
8	Al-Hilal Kadougli	26	6	13	7	19	21	−2	31	
9	Al-Ittihad	26	6	10	10	21	30	−9	28	
10	Al-Amal Atbara	26	4	13	9	26	26	0	25	
11	Al-Nesoor	26	8	4	14	21	39	−18	28	
12	Al Neel (O)	26	6	6	14	19	27	−8	24	Qualification for the relegation play-off
13	Al-Mourada (R)	26	3	8	15	18	45	−27	17	Relegation
14	Al-Ahli Wad Madani (R)	26	3	7	16	17	45	−28	16	Relegation

Updated to match(es) played on unknown. Source: RSSSF, GSA
Rules for classification: 1) Points; 2) Goal difference; 3) Goals scored.
(C) Champions; (O) Play-off winners; (R) Relegated
