= 2018–19 Sudan Premier League =

Sudan Premier League
- Season: 2018–19
- Champions: Al-Merrikh SC

The 2018–19 Sudan Premier League is the 48th season of the Sudan Premier League, the top-tier football league in Sudan. The season started on 22 November 2018.

== First stage ==
=== Group A ===
Pos	Team	Pld	W	D	L	GF	GA	GD	Pts	Qualification
1	Al-Merrikh	14	9	5	0	34	10	+24	32	Qualification for Championship playoff
2	Khartoum	14	7	3	4	21	15	+6	24	Qualification for Championship playoff
3	El-Hilal El-Obeid	14	5	4	5	20	17	+3	19	Qualification for Championship playoff
4	Hay Al-Wadi	14	4	7	3	12	16	−4	19	Qualification for Championship playoff
5	Al-Mourada	14	5	4	5	13	19	−6	19	Qualification for Relegation playoff
6	Al-Amal Atbara	14	5	2	7	14	22	−8	17	Qualification for Relegation playoff
7	Al-Ahli Khartoum	14	2	6	6	13	15	−2	12	Qualification for Relegation playoff
8	Al-Ahli Merowe	14	1	5	8	10	23	−13	8	Qualification for Relegation playoff

Source: Goalzz.com
Rules for classification: 1) Points; 2) Goal difference; 3) Goals scored.

=== Group B ===
Pos	Team	Pld	W	D	L	GF	GA	GD	Pts	Qualification
1	Al-Hilal	14	10	1	3	31	10	+21	31	Qualification for Championship playoff
2	Al-Ahly Shendi	14	8	4	2	16	6	+10	28	Qualification for Championship playoff
3	Al-Shorta El-Gadarif	14	6	2	6	18	17	+1	20	Qualification for Championship playoff
4	Al-Merreikh Al-Fasher	14	4	5	5	16	15	+1	17	Qualification for Championship playoff
5	Hay Al-Arab	14	4	4	6	12	17	−5	16	Qualification for Relegation playoff
6	Al-Hilal Kadougli	14	3	6	5	13	16	−3	15	Qualification for Relegation playoff
7	Wad Hashim	14	3	6	5	7	14	−7	15	Qualification for Relegation playoff
8	Al-Rabita Kosti	14	1	6	7	7	25	−18	9	Qualification for Relegation playoff

Source: Goalzz.com
Rules for classification: 1) Points; 2) Goal difference; 3) Goals scored.

== Championship playoff ==
Pos	Team	Pld	W	D	L	GF	GA	GD	Pts	Qualification or relegation
1	Al-Merrikh (C)	7	6	1	0	11	2	+9	19	Qualification for Champions League
2	Al-Hilal (Q)	7	5	2	0	20	1	+19	17	Qualification for Champions League
3	Al-Ahly Shendi (Q)	7	5	0	2	12	6	+6	15	Qualification for Confederation Cup
4	Khartoum (Q)	7	3	2	2	13	5	+8	11	Qualification for Confederation Cup
5	Al-Hilal Al-Ubayyid	7	3	1	3	6	10	−4	10	
6	Hay Al-Wadi	7	1	1	5	4	14	−10	4	
7	Al-Shorta El-Gadarif	7	1	1	5	6	21	−15	4	
8	Al-Merreikh Al-Fasher	7	0	0	7	3	16	−13	0	

Source: Goalzz.com
Rules for classification: 1) Points; 2) Goal difference; 3) Goals scored.
(C) Champions; (Q) Qualified for the phase indicated

== Relegation playoff ==
Pos	Team	Pld	W	D	L	GF	GA	GD	Pts	Qualification or relegation
1	Al-Ahli Khartoum	7	3	3	1	7	5	+2	12	
2	Hay Al-Arab	7	3	2	2	9	9	0	11	
3	Al-Hilal Kadougli	7	2	4	1	9	7	+2	10	
4	Al-Amal Atbara	7	3	1	3	9	8	+1	10	
5	Al-Rabita Kosti	7	2	3	2	5	5	0	9	Relegation playoffs
6	Al-Ahli Merowe	7	1	5	1	6	6	0	8	Relegation playoffs
7	Wad Hashim	7	1	3	3	5	7	−2	6	Relegation
8	Al-Mourada	7	1	3	3	3	6	−3	6	Relegation

Source: Goalzz.com
Rules for classification: 1) Points; 2) Goal difference; 3) Goals scored.

== Attendances ==
#	Football club	Average attendance
1	Al-Hilal SC	11,250
2	Al-Merrikh SC	7,083
3	El-Hilal El-Obeid	4,320
4	Al-Ahly Shendi	3,918
5	Khartoum NC	3,675
6	Al-Shorta El-Gadarif	3,480
7	Hay Al-Wadi	3,022
8	Al-Merrikh Al-Fasher	2,913
9	Al-Amal	2,755
10	Hay Al-Arab	2,745
11	Al-Mourada	2,621
12	Al-Hilal Kadougli	2,348
13	Wad Hashim	2,048
14	Al-Ahli Khartoum	1,936
15	Al-Ahli Merowe	1,521
16	Al-Rabita	908
