= 2017 Sudan Premier League =

Sudan Premier League
- Season: 2017
- Champions: Al-Hilal
- Champions League: Al-Hilal; Al-Merrikh
- Confederation Cup: Al-Hilal Al-Ubayyid; Al-Ahly Shendi

The 2017 Sudan Premier League is the 46th season of top-tier football in Sudan. The season began on 24 January 2017.

== Standings ==
Pos	Team	Pld	W	D	L	GF	GA	GD	Pts	Qualification or relegation
1	Al-Hilal (Omdurman)	34	23	11	0	67	22	+45	80	Champions
2	Al-Merrikh SC	34	24	7	3	66	21	+45	79	
3	Al-Hilal SC (Al-Ubayyid)	34	16	11	7	56	34	+22	59	
4	Al-Ahly Shendi	34	16	9	9	47	34	+13	57	
5	Al Khartoum SC	34	15	11	8	59	31	+28	56	
6	Al-Hilal SC (Kadougli)	33	13	11	9	41	33	+8	50	
7	Al Ahli SC (Khartoum)	34	15	6	13	45	43	+2	51	
8	Al-Shorta Al-Qadarif (Kassala)	34	13	11	10	46	42	+4	50	
9	Hay Al-Wadi (Nyala)	33	11	10	12	27	39	−12	43	
10	Al-Ahli Club (Atbara)	34	11	8	15	31	41	−10	41	
11	Hay Al-Arab SC	34	10	10	14	25	30	−5	40	
12	Al-Merreikh (Kosti)	34	7	14	13	28	43	−15	35	
13	Alamal SC Atbara	34	7	13	14	32	43	−11	34	
14	Al-Merreikh (Nyala)	34	7	13	14	29	42	−13	34	
15	Al-Merreikh (Al-Fasher)	34	7	10	17	27	45	−18	31	Qualification to relegation play-offs
16	Al Rabita Kosti	34	5	14	15	23	44	−21	29	Relegation to lower division
17	Triea Al-Biga	34	8	5	21	19	50	−31	29	Relegation to lower division
18	Al-Ahli SC (Wad Madani)	34	5	10	19	24	55	−31	25	Relegation to lower division

Updated to match(es) played on unknown. Source:

== Relegation Playoff ==
- First leg, November 28, 2017: Nidal Nhod 1-1 Al-Merreikh SC (Al-Fasher)
- Second leg, November 30, 2017: Al-Merreikh SC (Al-Fasher) 1-0 Nidal Nhod

Both teams remain in their current divisions
