= 2016 Sudan Premier League =

Sudan Premier League
- Season: 2016

The 2016 Sudan Premier League is the 45th season of top-tier football in Sudan. The season began in January 2016. Al-Merrikh SC are the defending champions, having won their 16th championship.

The league comprises 18 teams, the bottom three of which will be relegated to regional leagues for 2017.

== Teams ==
Locations of the 2016 Sudan Premier League teams

=== Stadiums and locations ===
Team	Location	Stadium	Stadium capacity
Al-Ahli Atbara	Atbara	Stade Al-Amal	13,000
Al-Ahli Khartoum	Khartoum	Khartoum Stadium	23,000
Al-Ahly Shendi	Shendi	Shendi Stadium	5,000
Al-Ahli Wad Madani	Wad Madani	Wad Madani Stadium	10,000
Al-Amal	Atbara	Stade Al-Amal	13,000
Al-Amir	Bahri	Khartoum Stadium	23,000
Al-Hilal	Omdurman	Al-Hilal Stadium	25,000
Al-Hilal Al-Fashir	Al-Fashir	Al-Fashir Stadium	10,000
Al-Hilal Kaduqli	Kaduqli	Murta Stadium	2,500
Al-Khartoum	Khartoum	Khartoum Stadium	23,000
Al-Merrikh	Omdurman	Al-Merrikh Stadium	43,645
Al-Merrikh Al-Fashir	Al-Fashir	Al-Fashir Stadium	10,000
Al-Merrikh Kosti	Kosti	Kosti Stadium	3,000
Al-Merrikh Nyala	Nyala	Nyala Stadium	3,000
Al-Nesoor	Khartoum	Khartoum Stadium	23,000
Al-Nil Shendi	Shendi	Shendi Stadium	5,000
Al-Rabita	Kosti	Kosti Stadium	3,000
El-Hilal El-Obeid	El-Obeid	El-Obeid Stadium	10,000

== League table ==
Pos	Team	Pld	W	D	L	GF	GA	GD	Pts	Qualification or relegation
1	Al-Hilal Club	34	28	3	3	82	15	+67	87	Qualification to 2017 CAF Champions League
2	Al-Merreikh	34	24	5	5	65	29	+36	77	Qualification to 2017 CAF Champions League and 2016–17 Arab Club Championship
3	Al-Ahly Shendi	34	23	4	7	68	25	+43	73	Qualification to 2017 CAF Confederation Cup
4	Al-Hilal (Al-Ubayyid)	34	20	10	4	48	21	+27	70	
5	Al Khartoum	34	18	11	5	51	22	+29	65	
6	Al-Hilal Kadougli	34	15	8	11	39	35	+4	53	
7	Al-Merreikh El-Fasher	34	12	9	13	33	38	−5	45	
8	Merreikh Nyala	34	10	10	14	28	36	−8	40	
9	Alamal Atbara	34	9	11	14	28	41	−13	38	
10	Al-Ahli Atbara	34	10	7	17	26	44	−18	37	
11	Al-Ahli Madani	34	8	12	14	32	41	−9	36	
12	Al Rabita Kosti	34	8	11	15	34	45	−11	35	
13	Merreikh Kosti	34	9	8	17	22	42	−20	35	
14	Al-Ahli Khartoum	34	7	12	15	21	37	−16	33	
15	Al-Nil	34	8	9	17	27	53	−26	33	Relegation to play-off
16	Al-Amir	34	6	12	16	19	55	−36	30	Relegation to Regional Leagues
17	Al-Hilal El-Fasher	34	7	8	19	23	45	−22	29	Relegation to Regional Leagues
18	Al-Nesoor	34	4	10	20	18	40	−22	22	Relegation to Regional Leagues

Updated to match(es) played on 26 February 2016. Source: Soccerway
Rules for classification: 1) Points; 2) Goal difference; 3) Number of goals scored
