= 2018 Sudan Premier League =

Sudan Premier League
- Season: 2018
- Champions: Al-Merrikh SC

The 2018 Sudan Premier League is the 47th season of top-tier football in Sudan. The season began on 3 February 2018.

== First stage ==
=== Group A ===
Pos	Team	Pld	W	D	L	GF	GA	GD	Pts	Qualification
1	Al-Hilal	16	13	3	0	35	9	+26	42	Qualification to Championship playoff
2	Al-Hilal Al-Ubayyid	16	9	4	3	28	15	+13	31	Qualification to Championship playoff
3	Khartoum	16	8	3	5	19	16	+3	27	Qualification to Championship playoff
4	Al-Ahli Merowe	16	7	2	7	21	17	+4	23	Qualification to Championship playoff
5	Kober Khartoum	16	5	4	7	13	21	−8	19	Qualification to Relegation playoff
6	Al-Shorta El-Gadarif	16	4	6	6	12	21	−9	18	Qualification to Relegation playoff
7	Al-Amal Atbara	16	3	6	7	12	19	−7	15	Qualification to Relegation playoff
8	Hay Al-Wadi	16	4	3	9	12	21	−9	15	Qualification to Relegation playoff
9	Al-Merreikh Kosti	16	1	5	10	9	22	−13	8	Qualification to Relegation playoff

Source: Goalzz.com
Rules for classification: 1) Points; 2) Goal difference; 3) Goals scored.

=== Group B ===
Pos	Team	Pld	W	D	L	GF	GA	GD	Pts	Qualification
1	Al-Merrikh	16	10	4	2	33	10	+23	34	Qualification to Championship playoff
2	Al-Ahly Shendi	16	9	4	3	25	7	+18	31	Qualification to Championship playoff
3	Al-Merreikh Al-Fasher	16	8	4	4	19	16	+3	28	Qualification to Championship playoff
4	Hay Al-Arab	16	6	3	7	19	20	−1	21	Qualification to Championship playoff
5	Al-Hilal Kadougli	16	6	3	7	16	22	−6	21	Qualification to Relegation playoff
6	Wad Hashim	16	5	5	6	15	22	−7	20	Qualification to Relegation playoff
7	Al-Merreikh Nyala	16	4	8	4	11	18	−7	20	Qualification to Relegation playoff
8	Al-Ahli Khartoum	16	2	5	9	6	17	−11	11	Qualification to Relegation playoff
9	Al-Ahli Atbara	16	3	2	11	12	24	−12	11	Qualification to Relegation playoff

Source: Goalzz.com
Rules for classification: 1) Points; 2) Goal difference; 3) Goals scored.

== Championship playoff ==
Pos	Team	Pld	W	D	L	GF	GA	GD	Pts	Qualification
1	Al-Hilal	14	12	1	1	30	4	+26	31 (Note: Al-Hilal had 6 points deducted by FIFA ruling.)	2018–19 CAF Champions League
2	Al-Merrikh	14	11	1	2	24	9	+15	34	2018–19 CAF Champions League
3	Al-Hilal Al-Ubayyid	14	6	3	5	16	13	+3	21	2018–19 CAF Confederation Cup
4	Al-Ahly Shendi	14	6	2	6	18	17	+1	20	2018–19 CAF Confederation Cup
5	Al-Merreikh Al-Fasher	14	4	2	8	12	22	−10	14	
6	Khartoum	14	4	2	8	14	22	−8	14	
7	Hay Al-Arab	14	3	2	9	8	20	−12	11	
8	Al-Ahli Merowe	14	2	3	9	9	24	−15	9	

Source: Goalzz.com
Rules for classification: 1) Points; 2) Goal difference; 3) Goals scored.

== Relegation playoff ==
Pos	Team	Pld	W	D	L	GF	GA	GD	Pts	Qualification
9	Al-Amal Atbara	18	9	6	3	22	12	+10	33	
10	Wad Hashim	18	7	8	3	22	19	+3	29	
11	Al-Shorta El-Gadarif	18	7	7	4	23	17	+6	28	
12	Hay Al-Wadi	18	7	6	5	17	14	+3	27	
13	Al-Hilal Kadougli	18	6	8	4	16	12	+4	26	Qualification to Promotion/relegation playoff
14	Al-Ahli Khartoum	18	6	8	4	19	16	+3	26	Qualification to Promotion/relegation playoff
15	Al-Ahli Atbara	18	6	6	6	20	22	−2	24	Relegation to Regional Leagues
16	Kober Khartoum	18	6	5	7	22	21	+1	23	Relegation to Regional Leagues
17	Al-Merreikh Kosti	18	5	4	9	16	23	−7	19	Relegation to Regional Leagues
18	Al-Merreikh Nyala	18	1	2	15	13	34	−21	5	Relegation to Regional Leagues

Source: Goalzz.com
Rules for classification: 1) Points; 2) Goal difference; 3) Goals scored.

== Promotion/relegation playoff ==
First Legs [Oct 10]

Hilal Fasher 1-0 Ahli Khartoum

Ahli W. Medani 2-1 Hilal Kaduqli

Second Legs

[Oct 13]

Hilal Kaduqli 2-0 Ahli Wad Medani

[Oct 14]

Ahli Khartoum 2-0 Hilal Al-Fasher

== See also ==
- 2018 Sudan Cup
