= 2019–20 Sudan Premier League =

Sudan Premier League
- Season: 2019–20
- Dates: 16 August 2019 – 24 October 2020
- Champions: Al-Merrikh
- Relegated: Al-Falah; Al-Rabita Kosti; Al-Ahli Atbara
- Champions League: Al-Merrikh; Al-Hilal
- Confederation Cup: Al-Hilal Al-Ubayyid; Al-Amal Atbara

The 2019–20 Sudan Premier League is the 49th season of the Sudan Premier League, the top-tier football league in Sudan. The season started on 16 August 2019 and ended on 24 October 2020.

== League table ==
Pos	Team	Pld	W	D	L	GF	GA	GD	Pts	Qualification or relegation
1	Al-Merrikh (C)	32	23	5	4	60	17	+43	74	Qualification for the Champions League
2	Al-Hilal	32	21	6	5	62	19	+43	69	Qualification for the Champions League
3	Al-Hilal Al-Ubayyid	32	16	10	6	49	24	+25	58	Qualification for the Confederation Cup
4	Al-Amal Atbara	32	14	11	7	43	29	+14	53	Qualification for the Confederation Cup
5	Hay Al-Wadi	32	12	13	7	29	22	+7	49	
6	Hay Al-Arab	32	14	7	11	38	42	−4	49	
7	Al-Merreikh Al-Fasher	32	13	9	10	38	30	+8	48	
8	Khartoum	32	11	13	8	30	18	+12	46	
9	Al-Ahly Shendi	32	13	5	14	42	35	+7	44	
10	Al-Ahli Merowe	32	11	8	13	28	35	−7	41	
11	Al-Ahli Khartoum	32	10	9	13	36	40	−4	39	
12	Al Hilal Al Fasher	32	9	10	13	27	39	−12	37	
13	Al-Hilal Kadougli (O)	32	7	11	14	28	46	−18	32	Qualification for the relegation play-off
14	Al-Shorta El-Gadarif (O)	32	8	8	16	32	51	−19	32	Qualification for the relegation play-off
15	Al-Falah (R)	32	7	9	16	29	47	−18	30	Relegation
16	Al-Rabita Kosti (R)	32	7	5	20	27	58	−31	26	Relegation
17	Al-Ahli Atbara (R)	32	4	5	23	26	72	−46	17	Relegation

Updated to match(es) played on unknown. Source: RSSSF
Rules for classification: 1) Points; 2) Goal difference; 3) Goals scored.
(C) Champions; (O) Play-off winners; (R) Relegated

== Relegation play-offs ==
Team 1	Agg.	Team 2	1st leg	2nd leg
Al-Hilal Kadougli (I)	1–0	Wad Nobawi (II)	0–0	1–0
Al-Shorta El-Gadarif (I)	0–0 (p)	Sbdo Aldaeen (II)	0–0	0–0 (5–4 p)
