= Mutaz Kabair =

Sudanese footballer

Motaz Kabier
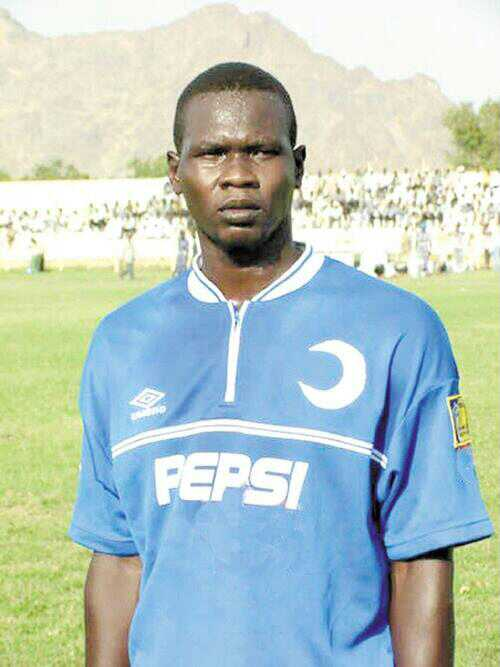

Personal information
- Full name: Motaz Ibrahim Kabier
- Date of birth: 15 January 1980
- Place of birth: Khartoum, Sudan
- Position: Forward

Senior career*
Years	Team	Apps	(Gls)
1992–1993	Wadi Al Nil SC (Shendi)		
1993–1994	Al-Difaa SC (Shendi)	11	(11)
1994–1996	Al-Ahly Shendi		
1996–2000	Al-Merreikh Al-Thagher	39	(19)
2001–2007	Al-Hilal Club	85	(67)
2004–2005	Hatta Club (loan)	21	(22)
2006	Ras Al Khaima Club (loan)	6	(5)
2008	Jazeerat Al-Feel SC	10	(2)
Total		0	(0)

International career^{‡}
2001–2004	Sudan	19	(4)
- * Club domestic league appearances and goals as of 22:00, 25 December 2010 (UTC) ‡ National team caps and goals as of 22:00, 25 December 2010 (UTC)

Mutaz Kabair or alternatively Motaz Kabier (born 15 January 1980 in Khartoum) is a Sudanese football player currently playing for Jazzerat Al Feel in the Sudan Premier League.

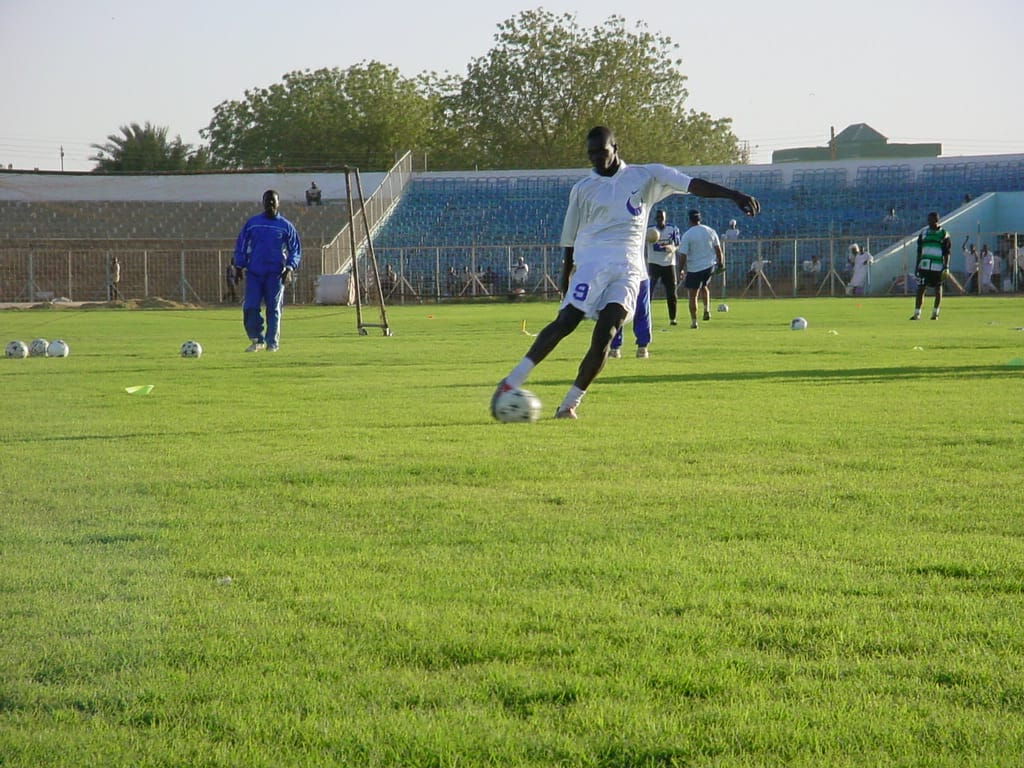

Kabair started his career in Shendi in the 3rd Infantry Division known as the 10th district of Ishlaq Alqiyada, where the mother of the armed forces of the people and grew up in the fields of the leadership district and played the youth links with the Nile Valley team Bashandi (1) Previous season (1992-1993).

His first contract was signed with Al Ittihad Shendi, who became the name of the supplier Shendi and then his current name Shendi defense for six years without charge. He played in the league only one season in 1994 and contributed to the rise of the third division to the second and participated with the club In 11 games and scored 11 goals by winning the top scorer.

In the 1995 season Al Ahli Shendi (1st Class) contracted with Kabair for 750,000 Sudanese pounds for 4 years and a major problem in the driving field because he moved without Nadia Al Ittihad's approval. As the players in the neighborhood teams belong only to their teams and do not transfer to any club Problems have reached the district limit of the neighborhood and any penalty has resulted in the player being suspended. However, on the first day of his new game against Hilal Shendi, he was openly fired and participated in his first match against Al-hilal Shendi. In his first season, he participated in 14 games and scored 12 goals, and won the league's top scorer. In my first local and local Sudan Cup season, 1995-1996 was playing in the midfield.

== Clubs ==
In the 1996–1997 season, the newly promoted Merrikh Port Sudan club entered the Sudanese Premier League with Kabair for 7 million Sudanese pounds for four years. In his first season with the club he participated in nine matches and scored one goal and was playing in the midfield. / 1998 with Al-Merrikh Port Sudan and the league was a two-group system that participated with the club in midfield in 6 games and scored two goals.

In his third season 1998–1999 with Al-Merrikh Port Sudan, in which he participated in the attack, his real start to fame, stardom and lights, he participated in 24 matches and scored 16 goals, and won the title of top scorer in the Premier League. AL-Hilal led the club to third place in the Rolit Premier League behind Al-MerrikhOmdurman Al Hilal as a runner-up in that season, making it the club to represent Sudan in the African Cup of Nations and scored this season 3 goals against the Al-Merrikh and team in the Khartoum game lost 2/3 and Port Sudan, Ended with a 4–0 victory as Kabair scored two goals, drawing the attention of the traditional peer Al-Hilal Omdurman.

Kabair went to Al-Hilal after his fierce rival from Mars on December 15, 1999, with 85 million Sudanese pounds. He played his first match against Al-Hilal against Marikh Al-Aobied in February 2000. He scored the goals of the match, participated in 26 matches, and scored 15 goals. Sudanese Premier League for the second time in a row and second place with Al Hilal. In his second season with Al-Hilal in 2001–2002, he participated in 23 games and scored 14 goals in which he won the title of top scorer for the third time in a row and led the club to win the Premier League after the absence of this tournament was the beginning of the series of Al Hilal winning the Premier League.

In the 2002–2003 season, Kabair participated in 25 games and scored 15 goals in which he led Al-Hilal Al-Osmi to win the Premier League for the second time in a row and achieved an unprecedented achievement. He won the top scorer in the Sudanese league for the fourth time in a row. In this same year, he participated with Al Hilal in the Prince Faisal Arab Championship in Tunisia in its final version, where he won with Al-Hilal second place behind the Tunisian stadium.

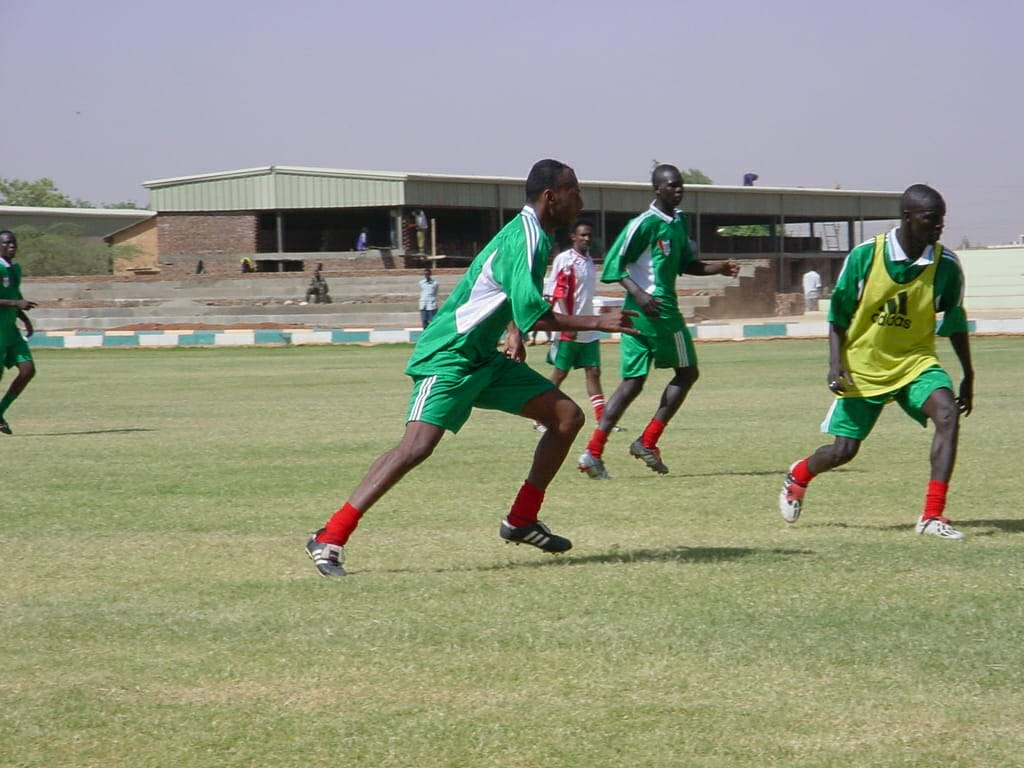

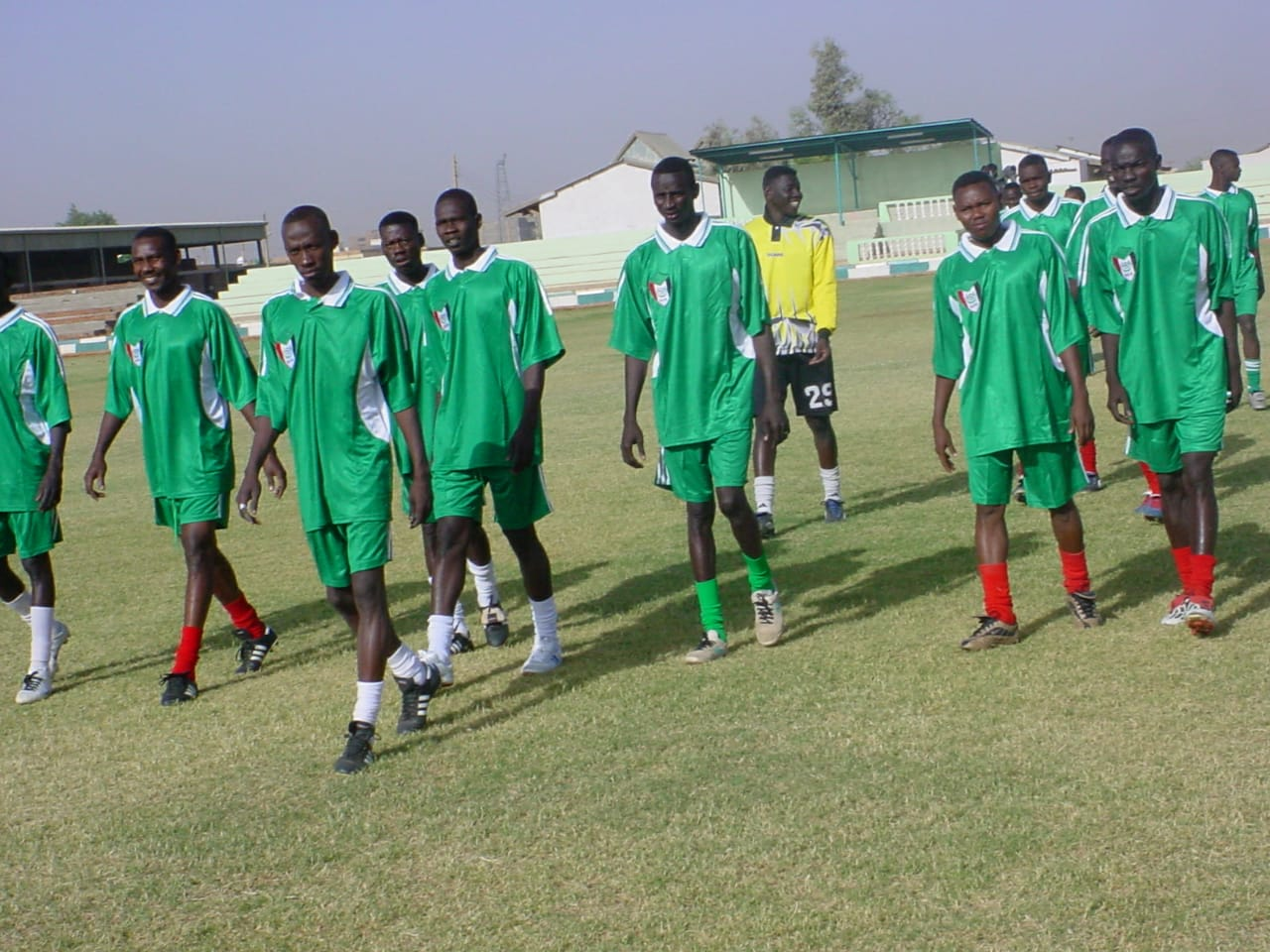

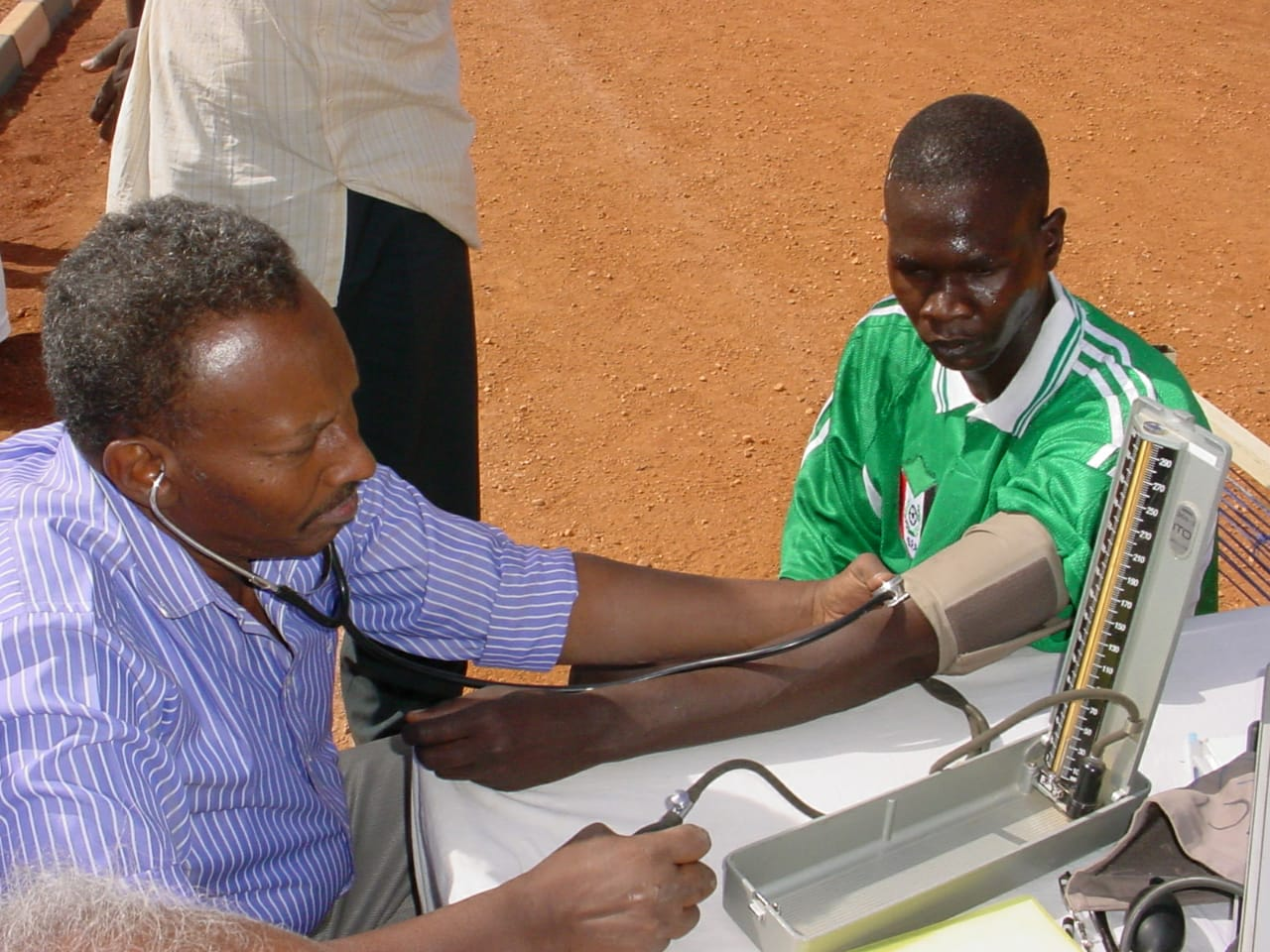

In the 2003–2004 season, he participated in 8 matches (first-leg matches only) and scored 12 goals. On 29/7/2004, Kabair was loaned to Hatta Emirates Club (2nd Division) for 10 months for $65,000.

He participated in the UAE club in 21 games and scored 22 goals and won the league's top scorer behind the Brazilian player Jadielson, knowing that the Brazilian played six more games in the semi-finals that did not qualify for the club Hatta. In May 2005 Kabair returned to Al-Hila Omdurman and participated with him in seven games and scored 6 goals. On Monday 2/1/2006 the player was rewarded and returned to the UAE League again but this time through the gate of the UAE club Ras Al Khaimah as a loan for 6 months. 6 matches were only remaining for the club in the league and scored 5 goals. In June 2006, Kabair returned to the Al-Hilal Al-Osmi club, participated in 6 matches, and scored 5 goals. On Monday 14/1/2008, Jazeerat Alfeel Club contracted with him for one season for 50 million Sudanese pounds and participated in 10 games and scored two goals.

== International career ==
Kabair played his first international match for Sudan in 2001 Sudan against Chad in the International Friendship Championship. He scored a goal and won with the friendly tournament in Khartoum. Participated with the Sudan team in qualifying qualifiers for the Nations of Africa and qualifying World Cup qualifiers for the 2002 World Cup in Korea and Japan. During Ramadan in 2004, Kabair scored a goal with the Sudanese national team against Tanzania in the SeaCafa (East and Central Africa) after a close shot in the middle of the pitch. Kabair has played for Sudan in 15 games and scored 6 international goals.

== Career statistics ==
=== International ===
Scores and results list Sudan's goal tally first, score column indicates score after each Kabair goal.

List of international goals scored by Mutaz Kabair
No.	Date	Venue	Opponent	Score	Result	Competition
1	26 July 2002	Al-Hilal Stadium, Omdurman, Sudan	Chad	2–0	2–0	Friendly
2	2 December 2002	CCM Kirumba Stadium, Mwanza, Tanzania	Tanzania	1–1	1–1	2002 CECAFA Cup
3	29 March 2003	Al-Hilal Stadium, Omdurman, Sudan	Benin	2–0	3–0	2004 Africa Cup of Nations qualification
4	19 April 2004	Khartoum Stadium, Khartoum, Sudan	Syria	1–1	1–2	Friendly
