= 2014 Sudan Premier League =

Sudan Premier League
- Season: 2014
- Champions: Al-Hilal Omdurman

The 2014 Sudan Premier League was the 43rd edition of the highest club level football competition in Sudan. Al-Merrikh SC are defending champions. Al-Hilal Omdurman won their 28th title.

== Standings ==
TEAM	POINTS
Al-Hilal Club (Omdurman)	65
Al-Merrikh SC	64
Al-Ahly Shendi	42
Al Khartoum SC	41
Al Rabta	40
Al-Merreikh (Al-Fasher)	40
Al-Ahli Khartoum	35
Al-Hilal (Al-Fasher)	32
Al-Nsoor	30
Alamal SC Atbara	29
Al-Hilal SC Kadougli	28
Al-Ahli Club (Atbara)	28
Al Nile SC (Al-Hasahesa)	14
Al-Ittihad SC (Wad Madani)	10
