= 2012 Sudan Premier League =

Sudan Premier League
- Season: 2012
- Champions: Al-Hilal

The 2012 Sudan Premier League (or SudaniOne Premier League for sponsorship reasons) was the 41st edition of the highest club level football competition in Sudan. Al-Hilal took out the championship.

== Standings ==
Pos	Team	Pld	W	D	L	GF	GA	GD	Pts	Qualification or relegation
1	Al-Hilal Club (Omdurman) (C)	26	21	2	3	73	15	+58	65	2013 CAF Champions League
2	Al-Merrikh SC	26	21	2	3	73	15	+58	65	2013 CAF Champions League
3	Al-Ahly Shendi	26	11	8	7	29	23	+6	41	2013 CAF Confederation Cup
4	Al Khartoum SC	26	12	4	10	33	36	−3	40	2013 CAF Confederation Cup
5	Al-Nsoor	26	10	4	12	27	32	−5	34	
6	Al-Ahli Khartoum	26	8	9	9	31	36	−5	33	
7	Al-Nil Al-Hasahesa	26	7	12	7	22	29	−7	33	
8	Alamal SC Atbara	26	9	6	11	20	28	−8	33	
9	Al-Hilal SC Kadougli	26	9	5	12	26	30	−4	32	
10	Al-Mourada SC	26	8	5	13	28	38	−10	29	
11	Al-Ahli SC (Wad Madani)	26	7	6	13	23	33	−10	27	
12	Al-Hilal (Port Sudan) (R)	26	7	6	13	28	43	−15	27	
13	Al-Rabta (R)	26	6	8	12	19	36	−17	26	
14	Jazeerat Al-Feel SC (R)	26	3	5	18	19	49	−30	14	

Updated to match(es) played on end of season. Source: RSSSF.com
Rules for classification: 1) points; 2) goal difference; 3) number of goals scored.
(C) Champions; (R) Relegated
