= Al Merreikh =

Al Merreikh may refer to:

- Al-Merrikh SC, Sudanese football club based in Omdurman
  - Al-Merrikh Stadium, their stadium
- Al-Merreikh SC (Al-Fasher), Sudanese football club based in Al-Fasher
- Al Merreikh FC (Juba), South Sudanese football club based in Juba
- Al-Merreikh Al-Thagher, Sudanese football club based in Al-Thager
