= Faisal Agab =

Sudanese football player

Faisal Al Agab
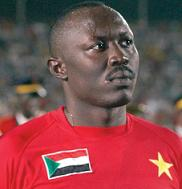

Personal information
- Full name: Faisal Al Agab Sido Tia
- Date of birth: 24 August 1978 (age 48)
- Place of birth: Khartoum North, Sudan
- Height: 1.90 m (6 ft 3 in)
- Position: Forward

Senior career*
Years	Team	Apps	(Gls)
1994–1998	Kober SC (Bahri)	86	(23)
1998–2013	Al-Merreikh SC	555	(216)
2014–2015	Al-Merreikh SC (Al-Fasher)		
2016	Al Nil SC (Shendi)		
Total		641	(239)

International career^{‡}
1998–2012	Sudan	47	(18)
- * Club domestic league appearances and goals as of 24/6/2015 ‡ National team caps and goals as of 1/2/2024

Faisal Agab Sido (Arabic: فيصل العجب; born 24 August 1978) is a Sudanese former professional football player who played as an attacking midfielder and striker for the Sudan national team and the Sudanese club Al-Merreikh. He was the captain at Al Merreikh SC where he wore the numbers 17 and 24, respectively.

Sido is the Sudanese all-time top goal scorer at the Africa Cup of Nations with 21 goals, and 7 goals at the Arabian tournaments. Agab is also the all-time top scorer in the Sudanese League, with 119 total goals since 1998, when he scored his first against Al-Nile (match ended 3–0). He has scored 111 goals for Al-Merreikh and 8 for Merreikh El Fasher. In the CECAFA Cup, Sido also scored four goals for Al-Merreikh.

== Honors ==
Al-Merrikh SC

- Sudanese Premier League: 2000, 2001, 2002, 2008, 2011, 2013
- Sudanese Cup: 2001, 2005, 2006, 2007, 2008, 2010, 2012, 2013
