= Haytham Tambal =

Sudanese association football player

Personal information
- Full name: Haytham Kamal Mahmoud Tambal
- Date of birth: November 28, 1978 (age 47)
- Place of birth: Omdurman, Khartoum State, Sudan
- Height: 1.73 m (5 ft 8 in)
- Position: Striker

Senior career*
Years	Team	Apps	(Gls)
1996–1998	Wad Nubawi SC (Omdurman)		
1998–2001	Al-Ahli SC	62	(37)
2002–2006	Al-Hilal Club	132	(97)
2006–2007	Orlando Pirates	1	(0)
2007–2011	Al-Merrikh SC	126	(62)

International career^{‡}
2003–2011	Sudan	61	(24)
Medal record
Men's football
Representing Sudan
African Nations Championship
Third place	2011 Sudan
CECAFA Cup
Winner	2006 Ethiopia
Third place	2004 Ethiopia
- * Club domestic league appearances and goals as of 11/12/2010 ‡ National team caps and goals as of 24/6/2024

Haytham Tambal (born November 28, 1978, in Sudan) is a former Sudanese football striker. In 2008 in the Sudanese league he scored 21 goals in 20 games. He used to play rivals Al-Hilal Club and Al-Merrikh SC and made a single appearance for South African club, Orlando Pirates.

== Career statistics ==
=== International ===
Appearances and goals by national team and year
National team	Year	Apps	Goals
Sudan	2003	10	5
Sudan	2004	11	5
Sudan	2005	12	8
Sudan	2006	7	3
Sudan	2007	4	1
Sudan	2008	14	2
Sudan	2009	2	0
Sudan	2011	2	0
Total		62	24

Scores and results list the Sudan's goal tally first, score column indicates score after each Tambal goal.

List of international goals scored by Haytham Tambal
No.	Date	Venue	Opponent	Score	Result	Competition	Ref.
1	29 March 2003	Al-Hilal Stadium, Omdurman, Sudan	Benin	1–0	3–0	2004 African Cup of Nations qualification	
2	29 March 2003	Al-Hilal Stadium, Omdurman, Sudan	Benin	3–0	3–0	2004 African Cup of Nations qualification	
3	17 September 2003	Sanaa, Yemen	Yemen	–	2–3	Friendly	
4	19 September 2003	Sanaa, Yemen	Yemen	–	2–1	Friendly	
5	12 October 2003	Khartoum Stadium, Khartoum, Sudan	Eritrea	1–0	3–0	2006 FIFA World Cup qualification	
6	12 December 2004	Addis Ababa Stadium, Addis Ababa, Ethiopia	Kenya	2–2	2–2	2004 CECAFA Cup	
7	14 December 2004	Addis Ababa Stadium, Addis Ababa, Ethiopia	Uganda	1–0	2–1	2004 CECAFA Cup	
8	18 December 2004	Addis Ababa Stadium, Addis Ababa, Ethiopia	Somalia	3–0	4–0	2004 CECAFA Cup	
9	25 December 2004	Addis Ababa Stadium, Addis Ababa, Ethiopia	Kenya	1–0	2–1	2004 CECAFA Cup	
10	25 December 2004	Addis Ababa Stadium, Addis Ababa, Ethiopia	Kenya	2–0	2–1	2004 CECAFA Cup	
11	27 March 2005	Ahmadou Ahidjo Stadium, Yaoundé, Cameroon	Cameroon	1–1	1–2	2006 FIFA World Cup qualification	
12	22 May 2005	Khartoum Stadium, Khartoum, Sudan	Chad	1–?	4–1	Friendly	
13	22 May 2005	Khartoum Stadium, Khartoum, Sudan	Chad	3–?	4–1	Friendly	
14	5 June 2005	Osman Ahmed Osman Stadium, Cairo, Egypt	Egypt	1–6	1–6	2006 FIFA World Cup qualification	
15	17 August 2005	Al-Merrikh Stadium, Omdurman, Sudan	Benin	1–0	1–0	2006 FIFA World Cup qualification	
16	8 October 2005	Al-Merrikh Stadium, Omdurman, Sudan	Ivory Coast	1–3	1–3	2006 FIFA World Cup qualification	
17	29 November 2005	Amahoro Stadium, Kigali, Rwanda	Somalia	–	4–1	2005 CECAFA Cup	
18	5 December 2005	Amahoro Stadium, Kigali, Rwanda	Djibouti	–	4–0	2005 CECAFA Cup	
19	3 September 2006	Khartoum Stadium, Khartoum, Sudan	Seychelles	2–0	3–0	2008 Africa Cup of Nations qualification	
20	3 September 2006	Khartoum Stadium, Khartoum, Sudan	Seychelles	3–0	3–0	2008 Africa Cup of Nations qualification	
21	24 December 2006	Beirut Municipal Stadium, Beirut, Lebanon	Mauritania	2–0	2–0	Friendly	
22	16 June 2007	Stade Linité, Victoria, Seychelles	Seychelles	2–0	2–0	2008 Africa Cup of Nations qualification	
23	14 June 2008	Khartoum Stadium, Khartoum, Sudan	Mali	3–1	3–2	2010 FIFA World Cup qualification	
24	6 September 2008	Cairo Military Academy Stadium, Cairo, Egypt	Chad	1–1	1–2	2010 FIFA World Cup qualification	

== Honours ==
Al-Hilal Club

- Sudan Premier League: 2003, 2004, 2005
- Sudan Cup :2004

Al-Merrikh SC

- Sudan Premier League: 2008
- Sudan Cup :2007, 2008, 2010

Sudan

- African Nations Championship: 3rd place, 2011
- CECAFA Cup: 2006; 3rd place 2004
