= Moaiad Abdeen =

Sudanese footballer

Moiaid Abdeen
Personal information
- Full name: Moaiad Abdeen Maki
- Date of birth: 21 May 1996 (age 30)
- Place of birth: Atbara, Sudan
- Position: Right back

Team information
- Current team: Al-Amal Atbara

Senior career*
Years	Team	Apps	(Gls)
2014–2015	Al-Watan Atbara		
2016–2017	Al-Amal Atbara		
2018–2020	El Hilal El Obeid		
2020–2021	Al-Hilal Club		
2021–	Al-Amal Atbara		

International career^{‡}
2019–	Sudan	3	(0)
- * Club domestic league appearances and goals as of 21:52, 3 January 2022 (UTC) ‡ National team caps and goals as of 21:52, 25 January 2020 (UTC)

Moaiad Abdeen Maki (born 21 May 1996) is a Sudanese footballer who plays as a right back for Al-Amal Atbara and the Sudan national team.
