= Kelechi Osunwa =

Nigerian footballer

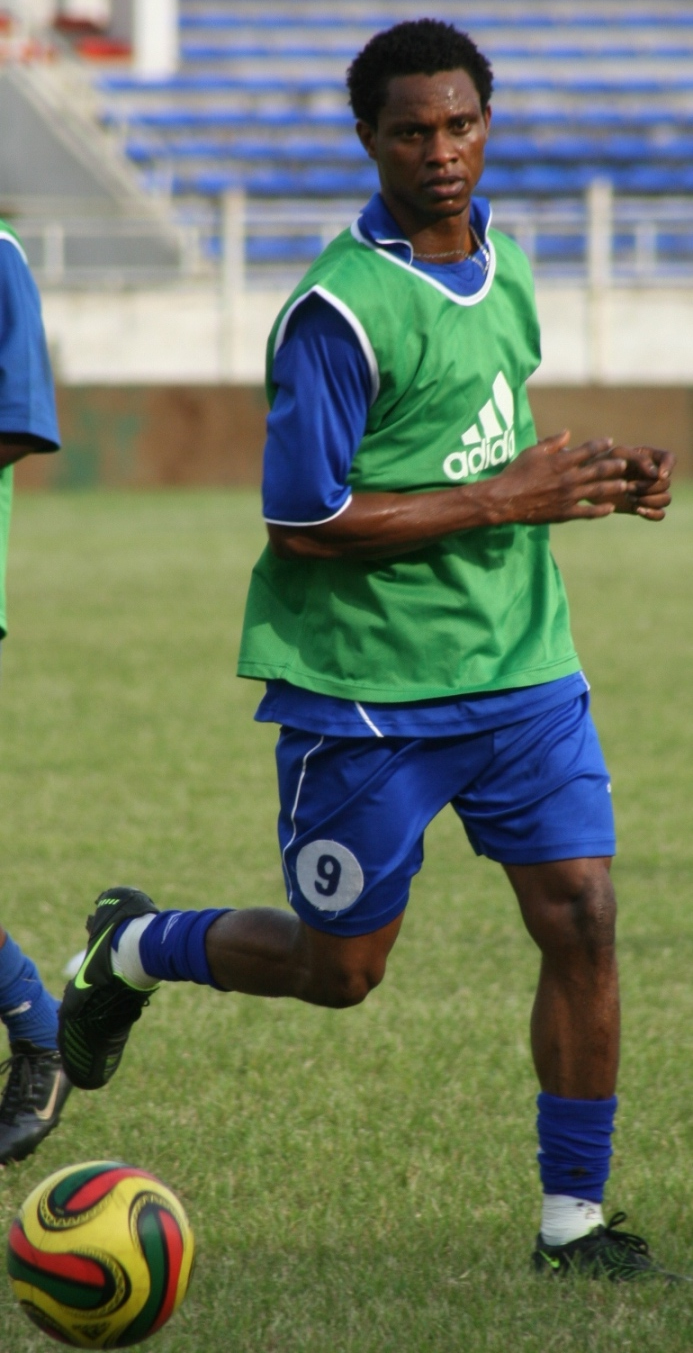

Personal information
- Full name: Collins Kelechi Osunwa
- Date of birth: 15 October 1984 (age 42)
- Place of birth: Rivers State, Nigeria
- Height: 1.83 m (6 ft 0 in)
- Position: Striker

Youth career
- Bright Stars FC

Senior career*
| Years | Team | Apps | (Gls) |
| 2003–2005 | Dolphins F.C. | | |
| 2006–2008 | Al-Hilal Club | 57 | (54) |
| 2008–2013 | Al-Merreikh SC | 167 | (104) |
| 2014 | BEC Tero Sasana | 4 | (0) |
| 2014 | Ismaily SC | 7 | (1) |
| 2015–2016 | Al-Ahly Shendi | 50 | (44) |
| 2017 | Al-Merreikh SC | 11 | (4) |

International career^{‡}
| 2004–2007 | Nigeria | 2 | (0) |
- * Club domestic league appearances and goals as of 24/6/2017 ‡ National team caps and goals as of 24/6/2017

Colins Kelechi Osunwa (born 15 October 1984) is a Nigerian football striker.

== Early life ==
Osunwa was born on 15 October 1984 in Rivers State, Nigeria.

== Career ==
Osunwa has played professional football since 2001. He played for Dolphins in Nigeria before moving to Sudan to join Al-Hilal. The former Nigeria youth international helped Al-Hilal reach the semi-final of the 2007 CAF Champions League.

In 2009 Kelechi signed a three-year deal with Al-Merreikh, where he would win the Sudan Premier League in 2011 and 2013. Osunwa formed an all-Nigerian strike force with former Enyimba striker Stephen Worgu, who also joined Al-Merreikh in January 2009.

Osunwa signed a two-year contract with Thai Premier League side BEC Tero Sasana in January 2014. After six months in Thailand, Osunwa signed a two-year deal with Ismaily of the Egyptian Premier League.

== International career ==
Osunwa was member of the Nigeria's under-23 national team. He played for the senior Nigeria national football team at the 2004 LG Cup in Tripoli, Libya. He was named to the preliminary Sudan squad for the 2012 African Cup of Nations.
