= Al-Merreikh Al-Thagher =

Sudanese football club

Al-Merrikh SC Port Sudan
- Full name: Al-Merrikh Sport Club
- Nickname: Merrikh Al-Thagher
- Founded: 1946
- Ground: Stade Port Sudan, Port Sudan, Sudan
- Capacity: 13,000
- Manager: Mohameed Jomea
- League: Sudan Premier League
- 2007: 12th
Home colours	Away colours

Al-Merreikh Al-Thagher Sport Club (Arabic: نادي مريخ الثغر الرياضي) also known as Merreikh Port Sudan is a football club in Port Sudan, Sudan.

== Honours ==
- Port Sudan League

== Performance in CAF competitions ==
- CAF Cup: 1 appearance

2001 – First Round
