= Stade Al-Merghani Kassala =

Multi-use stadium in Kassala, Sudan

Stade Al-Merghani Kassala is a multi-use stadium in Kassala, in northeastern Sudan. It is currently used mostly for football matches. The stadium has a capacity of 11,000.
