= Sudan Premier League =

Association football league in Sudan

- Founded: 1965; 61 years ago
- Country: Sudan
- Confederation: CAF
- Number of clubs: 33
- Level on pyramid: 4
- Relegation to: League of Local associations
- Domestic cup: Sudan Cup
- International cup(s): Champions League; Confederation Cup; Arab Champions League; CECAFA Clubs Cup
- Current champions: Al-Hilal SC (2025–26)
- Most championships: Al-Hilal Club (32)
- Top scorer: (Nigeria) Kelechi Osunwa (161)
- Current: 2026–27 Sudan Premier League

Sudan Premier League (Arabic: الدوري السوداني الممتاز) is the top division of the Sudan Football Association, it was created in 1965. It starts on 1 August and ends on 31 May.

== Sudan Premier League Clubs (2026–27) ==
1	Club	Year Formed	Stadium	City	State
1	Al-Merrikh SC	1927	Al-Merrikh Stadium	Omdurman	Khartoum State
2	Al-Ahli SC (Wad Madani)	1928	Wad Madani Stadium	Wad Madani	Gezira State
3	Al Mirghani ESC	1928	Kassala Stadium	Kassala	Kassala State
4	Al Ahli SC (Khartoum)	1929	Khartoum Stadium	Khartoum	Khartoum State
5	Al-Hilal Club	1930	Al-Hilal Stadium	Omdurman	Khartoum State
6	Hilal Alsahil SC	1937	Port Sudan Stadium	Port Sudan	Red Sea State
7	Al-Hilal SC (Al-Managel)	1942	Al-Managel Stadium	Al-Managel	Gezira State
8	Dabarousa SC	1942	Halfa Al-Jadida Stadium	Halfa Al-Jadida	Kassala State
9	Kober SC	1943	Kober Stadium	Bahri	Khartoum State
10	Al-Naser SC	1945	Omdurman Stadium	Omdurman	Khartoum State
11	Al-Falah SC	1945	Atbara Stadium	Atbara	River Nile State
12	Alamal SC Atbara	1946	Atbara Stadium	Atbara	River Nile State
13	Al-Merrikh SC (Al-Obeid)	1946	Al-Obeid Stadium	Al-Obeid	Northern Kurdufan
14	Al-Merreikh Al-Thagher	1946	Port Sudan Stadium	Port Sudan	Red Sea State
15	Al Rabita Kosti	1947	Kosti Stadium	Kosti	White Nile State
16	Al-Hilal ESC (Al-Fasher)	1948	Al-Fasher Stadium	Al-Fasher	Darfur
17	Al-Ahly SC (Al-Obeid)	1951	Al-Obeid Stadium	Al-Obeid	Northern Kurdufan
18	Al-Hilal SC (Karima)	1952	Karima Stadium	Karima	Northern State
19	Al-Merrikh SC (Kosti)	1954	Kosti Stadium	Kosti	White Nile State
20	Al Ahly Club (Merowe)	1956	Merowe Stadium	Merowe	Northern State
21	Al-Gash SC	1957	Kassala Stadium	Kassala	Kassala State
22	Haidoub SC	1957	En Nahud Stadium	En Nahud	West Kordofan
23	Al-Saham SC	1957	Al-Damer Stadium	Al-Damer	River Nile State
24	Al-Fajr SC	1957	Al-Obeid Stadium	Al-Obeid	Northern Kurdufan
25	Om Maghad SC	1965	Al Kamlin Stadium	Al Kamlin District	Gezira State
26	Al-Rabita Al-Silaim SC	1967	Dongola Stadium	Dongola	Northern State
27	Al-Zamala SC	1967	Umm Ruwaba Stadium	Umm Ruwaba	Northern Kurdufan
28	Hay Al Wadi SC	1977	Nyala Stadium	Nyala	Darfur
29	Al-Tagadum SC	1977	Port Sudan Stadium	Port Sudan	Red Sea State
30	Al-Merrikh SC (Khashm Al-Gerba)	1978	Khashm el Girba Stadium	Khashm el Girba	Kassala State
31	Al-Amir SC (Dongola)	1978	Dongola Stadium	Dongola	Northern State
32	Al-Shabab SC (Al-Managel)	1981	Al-Managel Stadium	El Manaqil	Gezira State
33	Al-Shurta Club	2008	Al-Gadaref Stadium	Al Gadaref	Al Gadaref State

== Championship history ==
No	Years	Champions
1	1965	Al Hilal (1)
2	1966	Al Hilal (2)
3	1967	Al-Mourada SC (1)
4	1968	Burri Khartoum (1)
5	1969	Al Hilal (3)
6	1970	Al Merreikh (1)
_	1971	Championship canceled
7	1972	Al Merreikh (2)
8	1973	Al Hilal (4)
9	1974	Al Merreikh (3)
_	1975	Championship canceled
_	1976	Championship canceled
10	1977	Al Merreikh (4)
_	1978	Championship canceled
_	1979	Championship canceled
_	1980	Championship canceled
11	1981	Al Hilal (5)
12	1982	Al Merreikh (5)
13	1983	Al Hilal (6)
14	1984	Al Hilal (7)
15	1985	Al Merreikh (6)
16	1986	Al Hilal (8)
17	1987	Al Hilal (9)
18	1988	Al-Mourada SC (2)
19	1989	Al Hilal (10)
20	1990	Al Merreikh (7)
21	1991	Al Hilal (11)
22	1992	Al Hilal Port-Soudan (1)
23	1993	Al Merreikh (8)
24	1994	Al Hilal (12)
25	1995	Al Hilal (13)
26	1996	Al Hilal (14)
27	1997	Al Merreikh (9)
28	1998	Al Hilal (15)
29	1999	Al Hilal (16)
30	2000	Al Merreikh (10)
31	2001	Al Merreikh (11)
32	2002	Al Merreikh (12)
33	2003	Al Hilal (17)
34	2004	Al Hilal (18)
35	2005	Al Hilal (19)
36	2006	Al Hilal (20)
37	2007	Al Hilal (21)
38	2008	Al Merreikh (13)
39	2009	Al Hilal (22)
40	2010	Al Hilal (23)
41	2011	Al Merreikh (14)
42	2012	Al Hilal (24)
43	2013	Al Merreikh (15)
44	2014	Al Hilal (25)
45	2015	Al Merreikh (16)
46	2016	Al Hilal (26)
47	2017	Al Hilal (27)
48	2018	Al Merreikh (17)
49	2018–19	Al Merreikh (18)
50	2019–20	Al Merreikh (19)
51	2020–21	Al Hilal (28)
52	2021–22	Al Hilal (29)
_	2022–23	Championship canceled
53	2023–24	Al-Hilal (30)
54	2024–25	Al-Hilal (31)
55	2025–26	Al-Hilal SC (32)

== Performances ==
=== Performances by club ===
Club	City	Champions	Runners-up	Champions seasons	Runners-up seasons
Al-Hilal Club	Omdurman	32	16	1965, 1966, 1969, 1973, 1981, 1983, 1984, 1986, 1987, 1989, 1991, 1994, 1995, 1996, 1998, 1999, 2003, 2004, 2005, 2006, 2007, 2009, 2010, 2012, 2014, 2016, 2017, 2020–21, 2021–22, 2023–24, 2024–25, 2025-26	1970, 1972, 1974, 1977, 1990, 1993, 2000, 2001, 2002, 2008, 2011, 2013, 2015, 2018, 2018–19, 2019–20,
Al-Merrikh SC	Omdurman	19	28	1970, 1972, 1974, 1978, 1982, 1985, 1990, 1993, 1997, 2000, 2001, 2002, 2008, 2011, 2013, 2015, 2018, 2018–19, 2019–20,	1967, 1968, 1973, 1983, 1984, 1986, 1988, 1989, 1991, 1992, 1994, 1998, 2003, 2004, 2005, 2006, 2007, 2009, 2010, 2012, 2014, 2016, 2017, 2020–21, 2021–22, 2023–24, 2024–25, 2025-26
Al-Mourada SC	Omdurman	2	4	1967, 1988	1987, 1995, 1996, 1997
Burri SC	Khartoum	1	—	1968	
Hilal Alsahil SC	Port Sudan	1	—	1992	
Al-Ahli SC (Wad Madani)	Wad Madani	—	2		1969, 1982
Hay Al-Arab SC	Port Sudan	—	2		1981, 1999
Al-Shati SC (Atbara)	Atbara	—	1		1965
Al-Ittihad SC (Wad Madani)	Wad Madani	—	1		1966
Al-Merrikh SC (Al-Obeid)	Al-Obeid	—	1		1985

== Qualification for CAF competitions ==
=== Association ranking for the 2025–26 CAF club season ===
The association ranking for the 2025–26 CAF Champions League and the 2025–26 CAF Confederation Cup will be based on results from each CAF club competition from 2020–21 to the 2024–25 season.

Legend

- CL: CAF Champions League
- CC: CAF Confederation Cup
- ≥: Associations points might increase on basis of its clubs performance in 2024–25 CAF club competitions
- Associations ranked 1–12 are eligible to enter two teams in each CAF club competition.

Rank			Association	2020–21 (× 1)		2021–22 (× 2)		2022–23 (× 3)		2023–24 (× 4)		2024–25 (× 5)		Total
2025	2024	Mvt	Association	CL	CC	CL	CC	CL	CC	CL	CC	CL	CC	Total
1	1	—	Egypt	8	3	7	4	8	2.5	7	7	10	4	190.5
2	2	—	Morocco	4	6	9	5	8	2	2	4	5	5	142
3	4	+1	South Africa	8	2	5	4	4	3	4	1.5	9	3	131
4	3	-1	Algeria	6	5	7	1	6	5	2	3	5	5	130
5	6	+1	Tanzania	3	0.5	0	2	3	4	6	0	2	4	82.5
6	5	-1	Tunisia	4	3	5	1	4	2	6	1	3	0.5	82.5
7	8	+1	Angola	1	0	5	0	2	0	3	1.5	2	2	55
8	7	-1	DR Congo	4	0	0	3	1	2	4	0	2	0	45
9	9	—	Sudan	3	0	3	0	3	0	2	0	3	0	41
10	11	+1	Ivory Coast	0	0	0	1	0	3	3	0	1	2	38
11	10	-1	Libya	0	0.5	0	5	0	0.5	0	3	0	0	24
12	12	—	Nigeria	0	2	0	0	0	2	0	2	0	1	21

=== Double Titles (League and Cup in the Same Season) ===
- Al-Merrikh SC : 6 times

1993, 2001, 2008, 2013, 2015, 2018

- Al-Hilal SC : 6 times

1998, 2004, 2009, 2016, 2021–22, 2024-25

== Top scorers ==
Season	Player	Club	Goals
1965	(Sudan) Alser Aljemel	Al-Hilal Club	8
1966	(Sudan)		
1967	(Sudan)		
1968	(Sudan)		
1969	(Sudan)		
1970	(Sudan)		
1972	(Sudan)		
1973	(Sudan)		
1974	(Sudan)		
1977	(Sudan)		
1981	(Sudan)		
1982	(Sudan)		
1983	(Sudan)		
1984	(Sudan)		
1985	(Sudan)		
1986	(Sudan)		
1987	(Sudan)		
1988	(Sudan)		
1989	(Sudan)		
1990	(Sudan)		
1991	(Sudan)		
1992	(Sudan)		
1993	(Sudan)		
1994	(Sudan)		
1995	(Sudan)		
1996	(Sudan) Osama Berish	Al-Merrikh SC	7
1996	(Sudan) Amir Musa	Al-Hilal Club	7
1996	(Sudan) Hamouri Al-Kamlin	Hilal Alsahil SC	7
1996	(Sudan) Hassan kenda	Hay Al-Arab SC	7
1997	(Sudan) Abdelmajeed Jafar	Al-Merrikh SC	9
1998	(Sudan) Abdelmajeed Jafar	Al-Merrikh SC	19
1999	(Sudan) Faisal Agab	Al-Merrikh SC	7
2000	(Sudan) Mutaz Kabair	Al-Merreikh Al-Thagher	14
2001	(Sudan) Mutaz Kabair	Al-Hilal Club	15
2002	(Sudan) Mutaz Kabair	Al-Hilal Club	15
2003	(Sudan) Mutaz Kabair	Al-Hilal Club	12
2004	(Sudan) Haytham Tambal	Al-Hilal Club	20
2005	(Sudan) Faisal Agab	Al-Merrikh SC	19
2005	(Sudan) Haytham Tambal	Al-Hilal Club	19
2006	(Nigeria) Endurance Idahor	Al-Merrikh SC	18
2006	(Nigeria) Kelechi Osunwa	Al-Hilal Club	18
2007	(Nigeria) Kelechi Osunwa	Al-Hilal Club	20
2008	(Sudan) Haytham Tambal	Al-Merrikh SC	21
2009	(Nigeria) Kelechi Osunwa	Al-Merrikh SC	21
2010	(Sudan) Mudather Karika	Al-Hilal Club	13
2011	(Zambia) Jonas Sakuwaha	Al-Merrikh SC	19
2012	(Nigeria) Kelechi Osunwa	Al-Merrikh SC	18
2013	(Sudan) Muhamed Koko	Al-Ahli Club (Atbara)	12
2013	(Sudan) Mudather Karika	Al-Hilal Club	12
2013	(Cameroon) Ousmaila Baba	Al-Ahly Shendi	12
2014	(Mali) Mohamed Traoré	Al-Merrikh SC	15
2015	(Sudan) Muhamed Ankaba	Al-Merrikh SC / El-Hilal SC El Obeid	12
2016	(Nigeria) Kelechi Osunwa	Al-Ahly Shendi	38
2017	(Sudan) Muhamed Abdel Rahman	Al-Merrikh SC	22
2018	(Sudan) Waleed Al-Shoala	Al-Hilal Club	16
2018–19	(Ghana) Richmond Antwi	Al Khartoum SC	11
2019–20	(Sudan) Abdel Raouf	El-Hilal SC El Obeid/Al-Hilal Club	15
2019–20	(Sudan) Ramadan Agab	Al-Merrikh SC	15
2019–20	(Sudan) Yaser Muzmel	Al-Ahly Shendi	15
2020–21	(Sudan) Muhamed Abdel Rahman	Al-Hilal Club	29
2021–22	(Ghana) Michael Aboagye	Hilal Alsahil SC	18
2023–24	(Sudan) Abdel Raouf	Al-Hilal Club	2
2024–25	(Sudan) Alsadeg Abdallah	Al-Merrikh SC (Al-Obeid)	8
2025–26	(Sudan) Muhamed Tia Asad	Al-Merrikh SC	10

== All-time top scorers ==
Rank	Nat	Name	Goals
1	(Nigeria)	Kelechi Osunwa	161
2	(Sudan)	Faisal Agab	118
3	(Sudan)	Muhamed Abdelrahman	117
4	(Sudan)	Muhannad El Tahir	115
5	(Sudan)	Mudather Karika	104
6	(Sudan)	Ramadan Agab	95
7	(Sudan)	Haytham Tambal	93
8	(Sudan)	Mutaz Kabair	87
9	(Sudan)	Mohamed Ahmed Bashir	80
10	(Nigeria)	Jamie Olago	76

== See also ==
- African Cup of Champions Clubs / CAF Champions League
- African Cup Winners' Cup / CAF Confederation Cup
- CAF Cup
