= Hilal Alsahil SC =

Sudanese football club

Hilal Al-Sahil
- Full name: Hilal Al-Sahil Sports Club
- Founded: 1937
- Ground: Stade Port Sudan, Port Sudan, Red Sea State, Sudan
- Capacity: 20,000
- Chairman: Omar Abdelhassan
- Manager: Khaled Bakhit
- League: Sudan Premier League
Home colours	Away colours

Hilal Al-Sahil Sports Club (Arabic: نادي هلال الساحل الرياضي) is a Sudanese professional football club founded in 1937 in Port Sudan. They played in the top division in Sudanese football, Sudan Premier League. Their home stadium is Stade Port Sudan. Their rival is Hay al-Arab, a team also based in Port Sudan.

== Honours ==
Hilal Alsahil SC Honours
Type	Competition	Titles	Seasons
Domestic (SFA)	Sudan League / Sudan Premier League	1	1992

== Performance in CAF competitions ==
=== CAF Champions League ===
- CAF Champions League 1 appearance

No	Years	Pld	W	D	L	GF	GA
1	1993 – First Round	2	0	0	2	0	3
Total		2	0	0	2	0	3

No	Years	Clubs	Old	W	D	L	GF	GA
1	1993	(Mauritius) Faucon Flacq SC	2	0	0	2	0	3

=== CAF Confederation Cup ===
- CAF Confederation Cup: 2 appearance

No	Years	Pld	W	D	L	GF	GA
1	2022-23 - Second round	4	1	0	3	2	11
2	2026-27 - First round	2	1	0	1	3	4
Total		6	2	0	4	5	14

No	Years	Club	Pld	W	D	L	GF	GA
1	2022-23	(Tanzania) Geita Gold SC	2	1	0	1	2	2
2	2022-23	(Egypt) Pyramids FC	2	0	0	2	0	9
3	2026-27	(Ethiopia) Welwalo Adigrat University FC	2	1	0	1	3	3

=== CAF Cup ===
- CAF Cup: 1 appearance

No	Years	Pld	W	D	L	GF	GA
1	1995 – First Round	2	0	1	1	1	3
Total		2	0	1	1	1	3

No	Years	Clubs	Pld	W	D	L	GF	GA
1	1995	(Uganda) KCCA FC	2	0	1	1	1	3

== Performance in CECAFA competitions ==
=== CECAFA Clubs Cup ===
- CECAFA Clubs Cup 2 appearances

No	Years	Pld	W	D	L	GF	GA
1	1993 – Group stage	3	0	0	3	0	3
2	2006 – Group stage	4	1	0	3	8	7
Total		7	1	0	6	8	10

No	Years	Clubs	Pld	W	D	L	GF	GA
1	1993, 2006	(Tanzania) Simba SC	2	0	0	2	0	4
2	1993	(Uganda) Express FC	1	0	0	1	0	1
3	1993	(Malawi) Bata Bullets	1	0	0	1	0	1
4	2006	(Djibouti) SID FC	1	1	0	0	6	0
5	2006	Police FC (Uganda)	1	0	0	1	1	2
6	2006	(Rwanda) APR FC	1	0	0	1	1	2

== Players ==
As of 14 August 2026

Note: Flags indicate national team as defined under FIFA eligibility rules; some limited exceptions apply. Players may hold more than one non-FIFA nationality.

No.	Pos.	Nation	Player
1	GK	SDN	Nasreldin Muhamed
2	DF	SDN	Khaled Hashem
3	DF	SDN	Ammar Kano
4	DF	SDN	Alaaeldin Fathi
5	DF	SDN	Mutwakel Adam (Captain)
6	MF	SDN	Mustafa Alsadeg
7	FW	SDN	Adel Kajoul
8	MF	GHA	Wilfried Kwesi
9	FW	SDN	Mahmoud Hassan Jedo
10	FW	GHA	Nelson Yaw
11	FW	SDN	Waleed Al-Shoala
12	MF	SDN	Muhamed Ebrahim
13	MF	NGA	Aabdoun
14	MF	SDN	Amir Ebrahim
15	DF	SDN	Zeryab Yousef
16	GK	SDN	Farid Eisa

No.	Pos.	Nation	Player
17	FW	SDN	Anas Saeed
18	MF	SDN	Mustafa Alsamani
19	DF	SDN	Abdelbagi Abas
20	MF	SDN	Osman Alfadel
21	DF	SDN	Ramadan Abdelbagi
22	DF	SDN	Khaled Hashem
23	MF	SDN	Muhamed Antar
24	MF	BDI	Edson Munaba
25	DF	SDN	Muhamed Musa
26	DF	SDN	Muhamed Ali Hussein
29	FW	SDN	Fares Muhieldin
30	GK	SDN	Ishag Adam
34	DF	BDI	Hussein Niragira
