= Al Ittihad SC (Wad Madani) =

Sudanese football club

Al-Ittihad SC
- Full name: Al-Ittihad Sports Club
- Founded: 1933
- Ground: Wad Madani Stadium, Wad Madani, Al Jazira State, Sudan
- Capacity: 15,000
- Manager: Said Salim
- League: Wad Madani League
Home colours	Away colours

Al-Ittihad Sports Club (Arabic: نادي الاتحاد الرياضي) also known as Ittihad Wad Madani is a Sudanese football club based in Wad Madani. They play in the top division in Sudanese football, Sudan Premier League. Their home stadium is Stade Wad Medani. Their rival is Ahli Madani, a team which is in the same city as Itthad Madani. The derby in Madani is called Madani Derby, which is one of the biggest derby in Sudan.

== Honours ==
=== National titles ===
- Sudan Premier League

Runner-up (1): 1966

- Sudan Cup

Winners (1): 1990

== Performance in CAF competitions ==
- African Cup Winners' Cup: 1 appearance

1991 – Second Round

== Performance in UAFA competitions ==
- Arab Cup Winners' Cup

1991 –Group stage
