= Al Neel SC (Al-Hasahisa) =

Sudanese football club

- Full name: Al Neel Sports Club
- Nickname(s): The Crocodile
- Founded: 1957
- Ground: Al-Hasahisa Stadium
- Capacity: 10,000
- Manager: Ahmed Adm
- League: Sudan Premier League
- 2014: 13th

Al Neel Sports Club (Arabic: نادي النيل الرياضي) also known as Al Neel Al-Hasahisa is a Sudanese football club based in Al-Hasahisa. They used to play in the top division in Sudanese football before being relegated to the 2nd division of Sudanese football after finishing 13th in the 2014 season, Sudan Premier League. Their home stadium is Al-Hasahisa Stadium located in Al-Hasahisa locality in Gezira State. Al Neel is one of the top Sudanese football clubs that participated in the regional African competitions.

== Performance in CAF competitions ==
- CAF Confederation Cup: 1 appearance

2011 – First Round

== Crest ==
Former logo

Present logo

== Current squad ==
This is the current squad of the team : Note: Flags indicate national team as defined under FIFA eligibility rules; some limited exceptions apply. Players may hold more than one non-FIFA nationality.

No.	Pos.	Nation	Player
9	FW	SDN	Osama El Tayasaha
-	GK	SDN	Mohamed Adam
-	GK	SDN	Magdi Alkadro
-	GK	SDN	Abdulrahman Mohamed Hamdi
-	DF	SDN	Hassan Ishag Karango
-	DF	SDN	Mohamed Suliman Rambo
-	DF	SDN	Adil Bokhari
-	DF	SDN	Zyriab Hassan Mohammed
-	DF	SDN	Motasim El Managqil
-	DF	SDN	Moawya El-Amin
-	DF	SDN	Abdalla Abd Alwahed
-	DF	NGA	John Sholi
-	MF	SDN	Ahmed Dofr
-	MF	SDN	Ahmed Adris

No.	Pos.	Nation	Player
-	MF	SDN	Glal Ibrahim
-	MF	SDN	Nor Alden Antar
-	MF	SDN	Nwaf Ibrahim
-	MF	SDN	Ahmed Babiir
-	MF	SDN	Islam Shams Aldin
-	MF	UGA	Joseph Kabagambe
-	MF	SDN	Muntasir Faraj Allah
-	MF	SDN	Baeselo
-	MF	SDN	Moaetiz Ibrahim
-	FW	SDN	Abdulrahman Mohamed
-	FW	SDN	Alla Den Babiker
-	FW	SDN	Ahmed Jomea Taban
-	FW	SDN	Khalid Algaeli
-	FW	SDN	Osama El-Ta'aysha
