= El Hilal SC El Obeid =

Sudanese football club

El Hilal El Obeid
- Full name: El Hilal Sports Club El Obeid
- Nickname(s): Hilal Altabaldy
- Founded: 1931
- Ground: El-Obeid Stadium, El-Obeid, North Kurdufan, Sudan Sheikan Castle
- Capacity: 27,000
- Chairman: Albasheer Khojal
- Manager: Salah Adam
- League: Al-Obeid League
Home colours	Away colours

El Hilal Sports Club El Obeid or simply El Hilal El Obeid is a Sudanese sports club established in 1931 based in El-Obeid. It is active in the Sudan Premier League and participated for the first time in the 2017 CAF Confederation Cup.

== Honours ==
=== National titles ===
- Sudan Cup
  - Runners-up (2): 2016, 2018

== Performance CAF competitions ==
- CAF Confederation Cup:4 appearances
  2017 – Quarter-finals
  2018 - play-off round
  2018-19 - First round
  2020-21 - First round

== Performance CECAFA competitions ==
- CECAFA Clubs Cup: 1 appearance
  1984 – Group stage

== See also ==
- Al-Hilal Club (Omdurman)
- Al-Hilal SC (Kadougli)
- Al-Hilal ESC (Al-Fasher)
