= Al-Merreikh SC (Al-Fasher) =

Sudanese football club

Al-Merreikh Al-Fasher
- Full name: Al-Merreikh Sports Club
- Founded: 1946
- Ground: Al-Fasher Stadium; Al-Fasher, North Darfur, Sudan
- Capacity: 10,000
- League: Sudan Premier League
- 2020-21: 16th place (Relegated)

Al-Merreikh Sports Club (Arabic: نادي المريخ الرياضي) also known as Merreikh Al-Fasher is a football club from Al-Fasher, Sudan. They play in the top level of Sudanese professional football, the Sudan Premier League. Their home stadium is Al-Fasher Stadium. It has a capacity of 10,000. Their colours are red and yellow.
