= Hay Al-Arab SC =

Sudanese football club

Hay Al-Arab
- Full name: Hay Al-Arab Sports Club
- Nickname: Sokertá
- Founded: 1928
- Ground: Stade Port Sudan, Port Sudan, Red Sea State, Sudan
- Capacity: 20,000
- Chairman: Jumaa Abdulrahman
- Manager: Khalid Haydan
- League: Sudan Premier League
Home colours	Away colours

Hay Al-Arab Sports Club (Arabic: نادي حي العرب الرياضي) is a Sudanese professional football club based in Port Sudan. They play in the top division in Sudanese football, the Sudan Premier League. Their rivals are Hilal Alsahil, a team which is also based in Port Sudan.

They play their home matches at the Stade Port Sudan.

== Honours ==
=== National titles ===
- Sudan Premier League
  - Runners-up (2): 1981, 1999

== Performance in CAF competitions ==
- CAF Confederation Cup (1) appearance
- 2009 - Preliminary round
- African Cup Winners' Cup (1) appearance

1982 –First round

- CAF Cup: 2 appearances

1996 – Second Round
2000 – Second Round

== Performance in CECAFA competitions ==
- CECAFA Clubs Cup 1 appearance

2009 – Champions

== Crest ==
Former logo

Present logo
