= Al Ahli SC (Wad Madani) =

Sudanese football club

Al-Ahly Wad Madani
- Full name: Al-Ahly Sports Club Wad Madani
- Founded: 1928
- Ground: Algazira Stadium, Wad Medani
- Capacity: 15,000
- Chairman: Abdallah Elkarim
- Manager: Aliyu Zubairu
- League: Sudan Premier League

Al-Ahly Sports Club Wad Madani (sometimes spelled Al-Ahli) (Arabic: النادي الأهلي الرياضي), also known as Al-Ahly Wad Madani, is a professional football club based in Wad Medani, Sudan. They compete in the Sudan Premier League.

== Performance in CAF competitions ==
- African Cup Winners' Cup (1)

1983 – Second Round

- CAF Confederation Cup (2)

2025–26 - First round
2026–27 – First round

== Performance in CECAFA competitions ==
- CECAFA Clubs Cup (1)

2025 - Group stage

== Players ==
As of 6 September 2026

Note: Flags indicate national team as defined under FIFA eligibility rules; some limited exceptions apply. Players may hold more than one non-FIFA nationality.

No.	Pos.	Nation	Player
1	GK	SDN	Aljaili Alrasheed
2	DF	SDN	Rami Kertikila
3	DF	SDN	Abdin Esmail
4	DF	SDN	Wadah Abdelmuhsen
5	DF	SDN	Salah Nemer
6	DF	GHA	Emmanuel Cudjoe
7	FW	SDN	Khaled Senja
8	MF	SDN	Muhamed Hashem Al-Teket
9	FW	SDN	Muaaz Al-Bakhakh
10	MF	SDN	Alsamani Alsawi
11	FW	SDN	Abdelgader Bashir
12	FW	NGR	Abubakr Garba
13	MF	SDN	Awad Alnayer
14	MF	SDN	Abdelaziz Kunda
15	DF	SDN	Esmail Gamzin
16	GK	SDN	Abdallah Adam

No.	Pos.	Nation	Player
17	MF	SDN	Nazar Abdelwakeel (captain)
18	DF	GAM	Assan Gibba
19	MF	SDN	Muaaz Berima
20	MF	GUI	Ebrahim Khalil Camara
21	MF	SDN	Dhiya Mahjoub
22	DF	SDN	Wajdi Jalal
23	MF	SDN	Emad Salah
24	MF	SDN	Omer Kaboushia
25	MF	CMR	Alexis Ako
26	MF	SDN	Esam Abdellatif
27	MF	ALG	Abdelgader Wabdi
28	DF	SDN	Yasin Alradi
29	FW	RSA	Jean Mark
30	GK	SDN	Muhamed Abdallah Kedyaba
31	MF	ALG	Yousef Metyar
32	MF	EGY	Ahmed El Geaidy
33	MF	SDN	Wajdi Awad

== Honours ==
- Sudan Cup
  - Winners (2): 1953, 2025–26
