= Al-Hilal Stadium =

Multi-use stadium in Omdurman, Sudan

Coordinates: 15°38′50″N 32°28′30″E

- The Blue Jewel
- Interactive map of Al-Hilal Stadium
- Location: Omdurman, Sudan
- Capacity: 25,000

Construction
- Groundbreaking: 1964
- Opened: 26 January 1968
- Renovated: 1992, 18 January 2018

Tenant
- Al-Hilal

The Al-Hilal Stadium (Arabic: ملعب الهلال), nicknamed The Blue Jewel (Arabic: الجوهرة الزرقاء) is a multi-use stadium located in Omdurman, Khartoum State, Sudan. It is mostly used for football matches and is also used for athletics. It is the home of Al-Hilal Club and has a capacity of 25,000.

== History ==
At the opening celebration on Friday, 26 January 1968, Al-Hilal played against the visiting Ghana national football team. The match ended in a 1–1 draw.

Amid the War in Sudan in February 2024, the Sudanese Armed Forces took control of the stadium.
