= Al-Mourada SC =

Sudanese football club

- Full name: Al-Mourada Sports Club
- Nickname: Al Helb الهلب
- Founded: 1927; 99 years ago
- Ground: Al-Mourada Stadium, Omdurman
- Capacity: 15,000
- Chairman: Abdalla Khalafalla Ahmed

Al-Mourada Sports Club (Arabic: نادي الموردة الرياضي) is a Sudanese professional football club based in Al-Mourada, a suburb of Omdurman. Along with Al-Hilal and Al-Merrikh, they formed the triplet of Sudanese football. Al-Mourada have been crowned as the champions of the Sudanese 1st Division in the year 1968. Their home stadium is Al-Mourada Stadium.

== Name and meaning ==
Al-Mourada is derived from the Arabic word mowrid (مورد), which is a port. The name was chosen to symbolise the importance of Al-Mourada suburb as a local port for goods. The football team is symbolized with red and blue colors.

== Domestic records ==
Type	Competition	Titles	Seasons
(SFA)	Sudan League / Sudan Premier League	2	1967, 1988
(SFA)	Sudan Cup	3	1953, 1995, 1997
(SFA)	Khartoum League	2	1979, 1995

== Performance in CAF competitions ==
- African Cup of Nations Clubs (2):

1968: Quarter-Final
1989: Quarter-Final

- African Cup Winners' Cup (4):

1988 – First Round
1996 – Second Round
1998 – First Round
2002 – Quarter-Final

- CAF Cup (2):

1992 – First Round
1994 – Semi-Final

== Performance in UAFA Competitions ==
- Arab Club Champions Cup (1):

1989 – Preliminary Stage

- Arab Cup Winners' Cup (3):

1993 – Semi-final
1996 – Group Stage
1998 – Group Stage

== Performance in CECAFA Competitions ==
- CECAFA Clubs Cup: 3:

1991 – Group stage
1995 – Third place
1997 – Quarter-final
