= Al Hilal SC (Kadougli) =

Sudanese football club

Al-Hilal Kadougli
- Full name: Al-Hilal Sports Club
- Founded: 1962
- Ground: Kadougli Stadium; Kadougli, South Kordofan, Sudan
- Capacity: 5,000
- Manager: Mohamed Abelnabi "Mao"
- League: Sudan Premier League
- 2011: 6th

Al-Hilal Sports Club (Arabic: نادي الهلال الرياضي) also known as Hilal Kadougli is a football club from Kadougli, Sudan. They play in the top level of Sudanese professional football, the Sudan Premier League.

== Achievements ==
- Kadougli League

Champion ( ):

== Current squad (2018-2019) ==
Note: Flags indicate national team as defined under FIFA eligibility rules; some limited exceptions apply. Players may hold more than one non-FIFA nationality.

No.	Pos.	Nation	Player
1	GK	SDN	Amin Tetr
2	DF	SDN	Abdelhaleim Rabeh
3	DF	SDN	Awad Elnaeir
4	DF	SDN	Malik Mohammed
5	MF	SDN	Abdalhab Ahmed
6	DF	SDN	Khalid Koria
7	MF	SDN	Dawood Hassan
8	DF	SDN	Mohamed Nawai
9	FW	NGR	Jamie Olago
10	MF	SSD	Koang Thok Kerjok
11	MF	SDN	Hamza Adm
12	FW	SDN	James William
13	MF	SDN	Khalid Ragab

No.	Pos.	Nation	Player
14	FW	SDN	Kamal Nawi
15	DF	SDN	Monzer Rahal
16	GK	SDN	Mohamed Abdallah
17	DF	SDN	Musharaf Zakria
18	MF	SDN	Mortada Kabeer
19	DF	SDN	Saif Eldin Ali Idris Farah
20	FW	SDN	Mortda Alnor
21	GK	SDN	Ismail Hassan
22	MF	SDN	Yahia Adm
23	FW	SDN	Omer Almela
