= Khartoum NC =

Sudanese football club

- Full name: Khartoum National Club
- Founded: 1950
- Ground: Khartoum Stadium, Khartoum
- Capacity: 23,000
- Chairman: Fouad Nega
- Manager: Amir Abu Aljaz
- League: Sudan Premier League
Home colours	Away colours	Third colours

The previous logo of Khartoum Sport Club

Khartoum National Club is a professional football club based in Khartoum, Sudan. They last played in the top level of the Sudanese professional football, the Sudan Premier League. They were previously known as Al Khartoum 3, which is the neighbourhood the team was founded in.

== Performance in CAF competitions ==
- CAF Confederation Cup (6):

2010 – First Round
2011 – Round of 16
2013 – Preliminary Round
2015 – Preliminary Round
2016 – Preliminary Round
2019–20 - First Round

- CAF Cup: 1

2003 – First Round

== Performance in UAFA competitions ==
- Arab Champions League (1):

2012–13 – Second Round

== Performance in CECAFA competitions ==
- CECAFA Clubs Cup/Kagame Interclub Cup (2):

2003 – Quarter-final
2015 – Semi-final
