= Al Ahly Shendi Club =

Sudanese football club

Al Ahly Shendi
- Full name: Al Ahly Shendi Club
- Nickname: Dar Jaal Tigers (نمور دار جعل)
- Founded: 1943; 83 years ago
- Ground: Shendi Stadium; Shendi, River Nile State, Sudan
- Capacity: 10,000
- League: Sudan Premier League

Al Ahly Shendi Club (Arabic: نادي الأهلي شندي) is a football club based in Shendi, Sudan.

== Honours ==
=== Domestic ===
- Sudan Cup
  - Winners (1): 2017

== Performance in CAF competitions ==
- CAF Confederation Cup: 9 appearances

2012 – group stage (Top 8)
2013 – second round
2014 – first round
2015 – first round
2016 – second round
2017 – first round
2018 - last 32
2018–19 - preliminary round
2019–20 - preliminary round

== Performance in CECAFA competitions ==
- CECAFA Clubs Cup \ Kagame Interclub Cup: 2 appearances

2013 – Quarter-finals
2015 – Quarter-finals

== Players ==
As of 31 January 2023

Note: Flags indicate national team as defined under FIFA eligibility rules; some limited exceptions apply. Players may hold more than one non-FIFA nationality.

No.	Pos.	Nation	Player
1	GK	SDN	Munir Alkheir
2	DF	SDN	Amjed Ismaeil (Captain)
4	DF	SDN	Abu Obida Ali
5	DF	SDN	Ali Hamed
6	DF	SDN	Abdellatif Boya
7	DF	SDN	Samir Gadal
8	MF	SDN	Mujtaba Almardi
9	FW	SDN	Muhamed Aldai
10	MF	SDN	Waleed Alaaeldin
11	FW	SDN	Muhamed Almuntaser
12	MF	SDN	Ghani Samir
13	MF	SDN	Adam Ombada
14	FW	SDN	Munir Younes
15	FW	SDN	Alhamim Hassan
16	GK	SDN	Younes Altayeb

No.	Pos.	Nation	Player
17	DF	SDN	Muazam Hassan
18	FW	SDN	Muhamed Osama
19	MF	SDN	Musab Kurduman
20	DF	SDN	Khaled Al-Jerif
21	GK	SDN	Awad Jafar
22	MF	SDN	Ehab Seedahmed
23	MF	SDN	Khojali Edris
24	DF	SDN	Badreldin Aldour
25	MF	SDN	Khatab Faisal
26	DF	SDN	Muhamed Habib
27	DF	SDN	Nader Ahmed
28	DF	SDN	Hesham Ataa
29	MF	SDN	Amro Mubarak
30	MF	SDN	Rihan Kabila
70	FW	SDN	Muhamed Almustafa
99	FW	SDN	Abdelrazeg Abdallah

=== Out on loan ===
Note: Flags indicate national team as defined under FIFA eligibility rules; some limited exceptions apply. Players may hold more than one non-FIFA nationality.

No.	Pos.	Nation	Player
—	FW	SDN	Fathelaleem Ebrahim (loan) Al-Nedal SC (Al-Nehoud) (Until June 2023)
