= Al Ahli SC (Khartoum) =

Sudanese football club

Al Ahli
- Full name: Al Ahli Sport Club
- Founded: 1929
- Ground: Khartoum Stadium; Khartoum
- Capacity: 23,000
- Chairman: Ahmad Tahaoui
- Manager: Latheef Hamdoun
- League: Sudan Premier League

Al Ahli Sport Club (Arabic: النادي الأهلي الرياضي) also known as Al Ahli Khartoum or Al Ahli Club, is a Sudanese professional football club based in Khartoum.

== Performance in CAF competitions ==
- CAF Confederation Cup (1) appearance

No	Years	Pld	W	D	L	GF	GA
1	2022–23 – First Round	2	0	1	1	0	3
Total		2	0	1	1	0	3

No	Years	Club	Pld	W	D	L	GF	GA
1	2022–23	(Libya) Al Akhdar SC	2	0	1	1	0	3

- CAF Cup (1) appearance

No	Years	Pld	W	D	L	GF	GA
1	1999 – Second Round	4	2	0	2	2	7
Total		4	2	0	2	2	7

No	Years	Club	Pld	W	D	L	GF	GA
1	1999	(Ethiopia) Medhin	2	2	0	0	2	0
2	1999	(Algeria) USM Alger	2	0	0	2	0	7

== Honours ==
- Sudan Cup
  - Runner-up (1): 1958
