= Alamal SC Atbara =

Sudanese football club

Al-Amal Atbara
- Full name: Al-Amal Sports Club Atbara
- Nickname: Leopards
- Founded: 1946; 80 years ago
- Ground: Atbara Stadium, Atbara, River Nile State, Sudan
- Capacity: 15,000
- Chairman: Jamal Hassan Saeed
- Manager: Omer Tenga
- League: Sudan Premier League
- 2020–22: 13th
Home colours	Away colours

Al-Amal Sports Club Atbara (Arabic: نادي الأمل الرياضي عطبره) is a Sudanese football club based in Atbara. They play in the top division in Sudanese football, Sudan Premier League. The home stadium of Al-Amal SC is the 15,000-capacity Atbara Stadium.

== Performance in CAF competitions ==
- CAF Confederation Cup: 3 appearances

2010: First Round of 16
2012: First Round of 16
2020–21: First round

== Players ==
As of 13 August 2022

Note: Flags indicate national team as defined under FIFA eligibility rules; some limited exceptions apply. Players may hold more than one non-FIFA nationality.

No.	Pos.	Nation	Player
1	GK	SDN	Altayeb Muhamed
2	DF	SDN	Mustafa Eldaw
4	MF	SDN	Abuelgasim Abdel Aal
5	MF	SDN	Muhamed Gotze
7	MF	SDN	Hamdi Yahia
8	DF	SDN	Al Fateh Suliman
10	FW	SSD	Alrayeh Hamed
11	FW	SDN	Bahaeldin Hussein
12	DF	SDN	Abdein Ismaeil
13	MF	SDN	Muhamed Daraj
14	DF	SDN	Abdellatif Adam
15	MF	SDN	Mohamed Ibrahim Hussein

No.	Pos.	Nation	Player
16	FW	SDN	Mustafa Yousef
17	FW	SDN	Yousif Elataa
18	MF	SDN	Mujahid Abbas
19	MF	SDN	Ahmed Jalaleldin
20	MF	SDN	Abbas Jumaa
21	DF	SDN	Adam Hassan
22	DF	SDN	Suliman Kalo
23	DF	SDN	Waeil Ezzeldin
24	MF	SDN	Hashem Hussein
25	MF	SSD	Saleem Muhamed
26	MF	SDN	Alamin Sayed
27	MF	SDN	Moaiad Abdeen
29	MF	SDN	Abdelkareem Mohamed
30	GK	SDN	Hassan Yousha (Captain)
—	MF	SDN	Muhamed Hadto
—	MF	SDN	Muataz Rabea
—	FW	SDN	Nail Mugadam
—	FW	SDN	Omer Turmbil
