= Sudan national football team results (1956–1979) =

This article provides details of international football games played by the Sudan national football team from 1956 to 1979.

== Results ==
Key
Win
Draw
Defeat

=== 1956 ===
13 May 1956 Friendly	Sudan	5–1	Ethiopia	Sudan

16 November 1956 Friendly	Ethiopia	2–1	Sudan	Ethiopia

=== 1957 ===
10 February 1957 1957 AFCON	Sudan	1–2	Egypt	Municipal Stadium, Khartoum
	Bashir 58'		Attia 21' (pen.); Ad-Diba 72'	Attendance: 30,000; Referee: Gebeyehu Doube (Ethiopia)

17 February 1957 Friendly	Sudan	3–4	Egypt	Sudan

8 March 1957 1958 World Cup qualification	Sudan	1–0	Syria	Khartoum, Sudan
	Manzul 78' (pen.)			Stadium: Khartoum Stadium; Referee: Riccardo Pieri (Italy)

24 May 1957 1958 World Cup qualification	Syria	1–1	Sudan	Damascus, Syria
	Al-Zarqa 70'		Suleiman Faris 38'	Stadium: Abbasiyyin Stadium; Referee: Konstantinos Ioannidis (Greece)

21 July 1957 Friendly	China	4–1	Sudan	China

=== 1959 ===
25 May 1959 1959 AFCON	Sudan	1–0	Ethiopia	Prince Farouk Stadium, Cairo
	Drissa 40'			Attendance: 20,000; Referee: M. Tsissis (Greece)

29 May 1959 1959 AFCON	United Arab Republic	2–1	Sudan	Prince Farouk Stadium, Cairo
	Baheeg 12', 89'		Manzul 65'	Attendance: 30,000; Referee: Zivko Bajic (Yugoslavia)

23 November 1959 1964 Summer Olympics qualification	Sudan	3–1	Ethiopia	Khartoum, Sudan
				Stadium: Municipal Stadium

9 December 1959 1964 Summer Olympics qualification	Sudan	1–0	Uganda	Khartoum, Sudan
				Stadium: Municipal Stadium

20 December 1959 1964 Summer Olympics qualification	Ethiopia	1–1	Sudan	Addis Ababa, Ethiopia
				Stadium: Addis Ababa Stadium

=== 1960 ===
3 January 1960 1964 Summer Olympics qualification	Uganda	0–1	Sudan	Kampala, Uganda
				Stadium: Nakivubo Stadium

=== 1963 ===
1963 Friendly	Ethiopia	4–0	Sudan	Ethiopia

1 June 1963 1963 AFCON Q	Kenya	0–1	Sudan	Nairobi
			Abdelaziz Ibrahim Adam

30 June 1963 1963 AFCON Q	Sudan	5–0	Kenya	Khartoum
	Abdelmajid Ahmed Osman; Omer Eltoum; Nasr El-Din Abas

18 September 1963 Friendly	Bulgaria	1–1	Sudan	Bulgaria

26 November 1963 1963 AFCON	United Arab Republic	2–2	Sudan	Kumasi Sports Stadium, Kumasi
	El-Shazly 5'; Riza 7'		Jaksa 60', 75'

28 November 1963 1963 AFCON	Sudan	4–0	Nigeria	Kumasi Sports Stadium, Kumasi
	Jaksa; El-Kawarty; Adam

1 December 1963 1963 AFCON	Ghana	3–0	Sudan	Accra Sports Stadium, Accra
	Aggrey-Fynn 62' (pen.); Acquah 72', 82'			Referee: Hédi Ben Abdelkader (Tunisia)

=== 1964 ===
27 March 1964 1964 Summer Olympics qualification	United Arab Republic	4–1	Sudan	Egypt

17 April 1964 1964 Summer Olympics qualification	Sudan	3–3	United Arab Republic	Sudan

=== 1965 ===
27 March 1965 1965 AFCON Q	Sudan	2–1	Ethiopia	Khartoum
	Hasabu Al-Kabeer; Jaxa		Worku

11 April 1965 1965 AFCON Q	Sudan	4–2 (Annulled)	Kenya	Khartoum
	(?) 40' 65' 78'		Madegwa; Rabuogi 50'

18 April 1965 1965 AFCON Q	Ethiopia	1–0	Sudan	Addis Ababa
	Wolde 56'

25 April 1965 1965 AFCON Q	Kenya	1–1 (Annulled)	Sudan	Nairobi
	Nicodemus 81'		Mustafa Shaweish 68'

1 May 1965 1965 AFCON Q	Uganda	1–3	Sudan	Kampala
	Kitonsa 72'		Jaxa 4', 75'; Jagdoul 37'

22 August 1965 1965 AFCON Q	Sudan	4–1	Uganda	Khartoum

2 September 1965 1965 Pan Arab Games	Sudan	9–0	(Yemen Arab Republic) North Yemen	Cairo
	Jaksa (?); Siddig (?); Muhieldin Osman (?); Saad Elfan (?); Ibrahim Yahia Elkawarty (?)

3 September 1965 1965 Pan Arab Games	Sudan	4–2	Libya	Cairo
	Siddig (?); Samir Salih (?); Ramadan Marhoum (?); Jaxa (?)

4 September 1965 1965 Pan Arab Games	Sudan	15–0	Oman	Cairo
	Mustafa Shaweish (?); Ramadan Marhoum (?); Hasabu El Sagheir (?); Samir Salih (?); Ibrahim Yahia Elkawarty (?); Amin Zaki (?)

7 September 1965 1965 Pan Arab Games	Sudan	2–0	Syria	Cairo
	Siddig (?); Ibrahim Yahia Elkawarty (?)

9 September 1965 1965 Pan Arab Games	Sudan	2–1	Palestine	Cairo
16:00	Amin Zaki (?)

11 September 1965 1965 Pan Arab Games	United Arab Republic	0–0	Sudan	Cairo
15:00

=== 1966 ===
July 1966 East African Friendship Cup	Sudan	2–1	Uganda	Ethiopia

4 July 1966 East African Friendship Cup	Ethiopia	1–1	Sudan	Ethiopia

12 December 1966 Friendly	Kenya	3–2	Sudan	Kenya

=== 1967 ===
29 January 1967 Friendly	Sudan	1–2	East Germany	Sudan

21 February 1967 East African Friendship Cup	Sudan	1–0	Tanzania	Sudan

24 February 1967 East African Friendship Cup	Sudan	1–1	Ethiopia	Sudan

26 February 1967 East African Friendship Cup	Sudan	5–3	Ethiopia	Sudan

28 February 1967 Friendly	Ethiopia	2–1	Sudan	Ethiopia

7 March 1967 Friendly	Libya	1–1	Sudan	Libya

10 March 1967 Friendly	Iraq	2–2	Sudan	Libya

18 March 1967 1968 AFCON Q	Congo-Kinshasa	3–2	Sudan	Kinshasa

2 April 1967 1968 AFCON Q	Sudan	1–0	Congo-Kinshasa	Khartoum

13 August 1967 1968 AFCON Q	Congo-Kinshasa	2–1	Sudan	Kampala

5 November 1967 1968 Summer Olympics qualification	Nigeria	1–0	Sudan	Lagos, Nigeria
				Stadium: Surulere Stadium

19 November 1967 1968 Summer Olympics qualification	Sudan	2–1	Nigeria	Khartoum, Sudan
				Stadium: Municipal Stadium

=== 1968 ===
27 October 1968 1970 World Cup qualification	Zambia	4–2	Sudan	Dag Hammarskjöld Stadium, Ndola
	Kapengwe 14', 56'; Kaposa 58'; Makwaza 83'		Babiker Santo 26', 30'	Attendance: 111,714; Referee: Philippe Mutombo (Zaire)

8 November 1968 1970 World Cup qualification	Sudan	4–2 (a.e.t.)	Zambia	Khartoum Stadium, Khartoum
	Abdel Kafi El-Sheikh 38'; Ismaeil Bakhit 76', 81'; Babiker Santo 114'		Chitalu 22'; Kapengwe 96'	Attendance: 137,083; Referee: Ali Kandil (United Arab Republic)

12 December 1968 Friendly tournament	Kenya	1–1	Sudan	Kenya

=== 1969 ===
8 January 1969 East African Friendship Cup	Sudan	1–0	Kenya	Ethiopia

10 January 1969 East African Friendship Cup	Sudan	3–0	Tanzania	Ethiopia

12 January 1969 East African Friendship Cup	Ethiopia	0–1	Sudan	Ethiopia

4 May 1969 1970 World Cup qualification	Ethiopia	1–1	Sudan	Haile Selassie Stadium, Addis Ababa
	Mengistu 79'		Hasabu El Sagheir 9'	Attendance: 109,015; Referee: Mohamed Touati (Tunisia)

11 May 1969 1970 World Cup qualification	Sudan	3–1	Ethiopia	Khartoum Stadium, Khartoum
	Gagarin 20', 60'; Jagdoul 80'		Asfaw 65'	Attendance: 122,373; Referee: Ali Kandil (United Arab Republic)

13 September 1969 1970 World Cup qualification	Nigeria	2–2	Sudan	Liberty Stadium, Ibadan
	Okoye 7', 30'		Abbas 33'; Jadallah Kheirelseid 43'	Attendance: 44,500; Referee: Ourabah Mohandi (Algeria)

3 October 1969 1970 World Cup qualification	Sudan	3–3	Nigeria	Khartoum Stadium, Khartoum
	Abbas 33'; Awad Koka 70'; Bushra Wahba 84'		Okoye 49'; Ineh 55'; Opone 72'	Attendance: 26,502; Referee: Aurelio Angonese (Italy)

10 October 1969 1970 World Cup qualification	Sudan	0–0	Morocco	Khartoum Stadium, Khartoum
				Attendance: 18,020; Referee: Ali Kandil (United Arab Republic)

26 October 1969 1970 World Cup qualification	Morocco	3–0	Sudan	Stade Mohammed V, Casablanca
	El Filali 41'; Jarir 76', 86'			Attendance: 150,000; Referee: Major George Lamptey (Ghana)

2 November 1969 Friendly	United Arab Republic	3–1	Sudan	United Arab Republic

=== 1970 ===
6 February 1970 1970 AFCON	Sudan	3–0	Ethiopia	Municipal Stadium, Khartoum
	Gagarin 43'; Hasabu El-Sagheer 47'; Jaksa 85'			Attendance: 14,464; Referee: Faber (Guinea)

8 February 1970 1970 AFCON	Ivory Coast	1–0	Sudan	Municipal Stadium, Khartoum
	Tahi 89'			Attendance: 9,864; Referee: Mahombé (Congo-Kinshasa)

10 February 1970 1970 AFCON	Sudan	2–1	Cameroon	Municipal Stadium, Khartoum
	Jaksa 20'; Hasabu El-Sagheer 60'		Tsébo 34'	Attendance: 9,770; Referee: Ngom (Senegal)

14 February 1970 1970 AFCON	United Arab Republic	1–2 (a.e.t.)	Sudan	Municipal Stadium, Khartoum
	El-Shazly 84'		El-Asyad 83', 102'	Attendance: 12,350

16 February 1970 1970 AFCON	Sudan	1–0	Ghana	Municipal Stadium, Khartoum
	Hasabu El-Sagheer 12'			Attendance: 12,187; Referee: Gebreyesus Tesfaye (Ethiopia)

30 June 1970 Friendly	Congo-Kinshasa	0–3	Sudan	Congo-Kinshasa

3 July 1970 1970 Al-Jalaa Tournament GS	Sudan	4–1	Team Palestine	Tripoli, Libya

5 July 1970 1970 Al-Jalaa Tournament GS	Libya B	0–2	Sudan	Tripoli, Libya

7 July 1970 1970 Al-Jalaa Tournament GS	Lebanon	0–2	Sudan	Tripoli, Libya

10 July 1970 1970 Al-Jalaa Tournament SF	Sudan	2–0	Algeria	Tripoli, Libya

12 July 1970 1970 Al-Jalaa Tournament F	Sudan	1–0	Libya	Tripoli, Libya

=== 1971 ===
4 June 1971	Sudan	4–0	Uganda	Khartoum
	Ezzeldin Osman; Elfadil Santo

19 June 1971	Uganda	1–1	Sudan	Kampala
	Obua 32' (pen.)		Ezzeldin Osman 65'

9 July 1971 1971 Al-Jalaa Tournament GS	Libyan Army (Libya)	0–3	Sudan	Tripoli, Libya

11 July 1971 1971 Al-Jalaa Tournament GS	Palestine	1–1	Sudan	Tripoli, Libya

13 July 1971 1971 Al-Jalaa Tournament GS	Libya B	0–0	Sudan	Tripoli, Libya

16 July 1971 1971 Al-Jalaa Tournament SF	Libya	4–6 (a.e.t.)	Sudan	Benghazi, Libya

18 July 1971 1971 Al-Jalaa Tournament F	Libya B	1–1 (a.e.t.) (2–3 p)	Sudan	Benghazi, Libya

=== 1972 ===
25 February 1972 1972 AFCON	Zaire	1–1	Sudan	Stade de la Réunification, Douala
	Mayanga 53'		Hasabu El-Sagheer 55'	Referee: Sané Mady Diallo (Mali)

27 February 1972 1972 AFCON	Morocco	1–1	Sudan	Stade de la Réunification, Douala
	Faras 32'		Abdel-Nadief 49'	Referee: Michael Wacka (Cameroon)

29 February 1972 1972 AFCON	Congo	4–2	Sudan	Stade de la Réunification, Douala
	M'Bono 8', 55'; M'Pelé 32'; Bahamboula 46'		Abdel Wahab 37'; Wahba 44'	Referee: George Lamptey (Ghana)

2 May 1972	Ethiopia	2–2	Sudan	Addis Ababa
	Sebeta 7'; Zergaw 50'		Hasabu El Sagheir 5'; Kamal Abdelwahab 87'

7 May 1972	Sudan	3–0	Madagascar	Khartoum
	Hasabu El Sagheir; Ezzeldin Osman; Kamal Abdelwahab

21 May 1972	Sudan	1–0	Ethiopia	Khartoum
	Kamal Abdelwahab 12'

28 May 1972	Madagascar	0–2 (Note: The match was abandoned after Magalasy immigration officials refused the Sudanese team entry into the country following mass protests; Sudan were awarded the match 2–0.)	Sudan	Antananarivo

4 July 1972 Friendly	Tanzania	0–3	Sudan	Tanzania

16 July 1972 1974 World Cup qualification	Kenya	0–2	Sudan	Nairobi, Kenya
	Anyanzwa 44'; W. Ouma 65'			Stadium: Nairobi City Stadium; Attendance: 11,057; Referee: Ayele Tessema (Ethiopia)

23 July 1972 1974 World Cup qualification	Sudan	1–0	Kenya	Khartoum, Sudan
	Ezzeldin Osman 40'			Stadium: Khartoum Stadium; Attendance: 10,470; Referee: Mahmoud Moustapha Kamel (Egypt)

28 August 1972	Mexico	1–0	Sudan	Frankenstadion, Nuremberg
12:00	Manzo 16'	Report		Attendance: 500; Referee: Francesco Francescon (Italy)

30 August 1972	Soviet Union	2–1	Sudan	Olympic Stadium, Munich
12:00	Yevriuzhikin 42' (pen.); Zanazanyan 44'	Report	Jaksa 59'	Attendance: 25,000; Referee: Ferdinand Biwersi (West Germany)

1 September 1972	Burma	2–0	Sudan	Dreiflüssestadion, Passau
12:00	Soe Than 7'; Aung Moe Thin 61'	Report		Attendance: 2,000; Referee: Marian Srodecki (Poland)

=== 1973 ===
1973 Friendly	Sudan	1–0	Ethiopia	Sudan

13 April 1973 1974 AFCON Q	Sudan	1–1	Nigeria	Khartoum

21 April 1973 1974 AFCON Q	Nigeria	2–1	Sudan	Lagos

=== 1974 ===
28 September 1974	Sudan	6–0	North Yemen	Abbasiyyin Stadium, Damascus
	Al-Siddiq; Ahmed; Othman

30 September 1974	Sudan	3–1	Palestine	Abbasiyyin Stadium, Damascus
	Al-Kuri; Baye; Al-Siddiq		Abdel Aziz

2 October 1974	Syria	2–0	Sudan	Abbasiyyin Stadium, Damascus
	Sorour; Goutouk

4 October 1974	Sudan	3–1	Libya	Abbasiyyin Stadium, Damascus
	Ahmed; Othman; Abdel-Wahhab		Al-Aswad

7 October 1974	Morocco	2–0	Sudan	Abbasiyyin Stadium, Damascus
	Dish; Ahmed		Boughanieh

9 October 1974	Tunisia	3–1	Sudan	Abbasiyyin Stadium, Damascus
	Kretet; Kamoun		Abdallah

=== 1975 ===
23 March 1975 1978 AFCON Q	Sudan	1–0	Kenya	Khartoum Stadium, Khartoum
	Gagarin 26'

6 April 1975 1978 AFCON Q	Kenya	0–2	Sudan	Nairobi City Stadium, Nairobi
			Gagarin 42', 90'

2 May 1975	Egypt	1–1	Sudan	Nasser Stadium, Cairo
	Shehata 29'		Goal

30 May 1975	Sudan	1–0	Egypt	Khartoum Stadium, Khartoum
	Gagarin

6 July 1975 1978 AFCON Q	Tunisia	3–2	Sudan	Stade El Menzah, Tunis
	Ben Aziza 2'; Lahzami 5', 27'		Gagarin 34'; Khider Elkori 50'

15 August 1975 1978 AFCON Q	Sudan	2–1	Tunisia	Khartoum
	Kamal Abdelwahab 9'; Gagarin 75'		Ben Aziza 60'

22 November 1975	Tanzania	1–0	Sudan	Uhuru Stadium, Dar es Salaam
	Goal

5 December 1975	Sudan	2–0	Tanzania	Khartoum Stadium, Khartoum

21 December 1975 1975 Palestine Cup of Nations	Sudan	0–0	Palestine	Tunis

23 December 1975 1975 Palestine Cup of Nations	Palestine	0–1	Sudan	Tunis

26 December 1975 1975 Palestine Cup of Nations	Egypt	3–1	Sudan	Tunis
	Omasha 4'; Shehata 48'; Zizo 75'		(?)

28 December 1975 1975 Palestine Cup of Nations	Sudan	1–0	Syria	Tunis

=== 1976 ===
1 January 1976 Friendly	Libya	1–0	Sudan	Libya

1 March 1976 1976 AFCON	Morocco	2–2	Sudan	Dire Dawa Stadium, Dire Dawa
	Chérif 1'; Abouali 58'		Gagarin 9', 79' (pen.)	Referee: Gratian Matovu (Tanzania)

4 March 1976 1976 AFCON	Nigeria	1–0	Sudan	Dire Dawa Stadium, Dire Dawa
	Usiyan 8'			Referee: Nyirenda Chayu (Zambia)

6 March 1976 1976 AFCON	Zaire	1–1	Sudan	Dire Dawa Stadium, Dire Dawa
	Mulamba 41'		Gagarin 14'	Attendance: 4,000; Referee: Robert Foiret (Mauritius)

28 March 1976	Zambia	1–1	Sudan	Dag Hammarskjöld Stadium, Ndola
	Chanda		Ali Gagarin 20'

4 April 1976	Sudan	0–0 (4–5 p)	Zambia	Khartoum Stadium, Khartoum

=== 1977 ===
14 November 1977 1978 All-Africa Games qualification	Sudan	2–0	Somalia	Cairo, Egypt
				Stadium: Cairo International Stadium

16 November 1977 1978 All-Africa Games qualification	Egypt	1–0	Sudan	Cairo, Egypt
				Stadium: Cairo International Stadium

=== 1978 ===
30 January 1978 Friendly	Sudan	2–1	Congo	Sudan

=== 1979 ===
29 June 1979 1980 AFCON Q	Sudan	2–0	Ivory Coast	Khartoum

6 July 1979 1980 AFCON Q	Ivory Coast	4–0	Sudan	Abidjan

September 1979 Presidents Cup	Bahrain	1–0	Sudan	South Korea

September 1979 Presidents Cup	Sudan	1–0	Sri Lanka	South Korea

September 1979 Presidents Cup	Sudan	4–1	Bangladesh	South Korea

8 September 1979 Presidents Cup	South Korea	8–0	Sudan	South Korea

7 November 1979 1979 CECAFA Cup	Malawi	4–0	Sudan	Kenya
	Waya; Phiri; Billie; Dandize

9 November 1979 1979 CECAFA Cup	Zanzibar	1–1	Sudan	Kenya
