= Open Door =

(The) Open Door(s) may refer to:

== Schools ==
- Open Door Christian Academy, Troutdale, Oregon, U.S.
- Open Door Christian School (Elyria, Ohio)
- Open Door Alternate School, a school in School District 22 Vernon, British Columbia, Canada

== Literature ==
- The Open Door (al-Zayyat novel) (1961)
- The Open Door (Sillitoe novel) (1989)
- Open Door Series, an Irish adult literacy book series
- "The Open Door", a story by Margaret Oliphant

== Film ==
- The Open Door (1957 film), a Spanish film by César Fernández Ardavín
- The Open Door (1963 film), an Egyptian film by Henry Barakat
- Open Doors (film) (Porte aperte), a 1990 Italian film
- The Open Doors, a 2004 British short film based on a Saki short story
- The Open Door (2008 film), an American horror film with Catherine Munden
- The Open Door, a 1913 short film by Edward Barker with Tom Chatterton
- The Open Door, a 1914 short film with Alberto Capozzi
- The Open Door (2016 film), a Spanish film with Carmen Machi
- Open Door (2019 film), an Albanian film by Florenc Papas with Luli Bitri

== Television ==
- Open Door (TV programme), a British television programme produced by the BBC's Community Programme Unit that debuted in 1973
- Jacqueline Susann's Open Door, a 1951 American talk show
- Otvorena vrata or Open Door, a Serbian TV series

== Music ==
- The Open Door, a 2006 album by Evanescence
- Open Doors (album), an album by Nigerian Gospel musician Nosa
- "Open Door", a song by Genesis from their 1980 album, Duke
- The Open Door EP, a 2009 EP by Death Cab for Cutie
- "Open Door" (song), a 2012 song by Attaloss
- Open Doors, a 2002 EP by Brandi Carlile

== Other uses ==
- Opendoor, a popular online real estate buyer and seller
- Open Doors, a non-denominational Christian mission
- Open Door, Buenos Aires, a town in Luján Partido, Argentina
- Open-door academic policy, a university admissions policy
- Open Door Children's Home, Rome, Georgia, U.S.
- Open Door Council, a 1926-1965 British organisation pressing for equal economic opportunities for women
- Open Door Policy, the United States diplomatic policy toward China of the late 19th and early 20th centuries
- Open door policy (business), the managerial practice of encouraging openness and transparency with the employees

== See also ==
- Doors open (disambiguation)
