= 1965 African Cup of Nations qualification =

Football tournament

This page details the process of qualifying for the 1965 African Cup of Nations.

== Qualified teams ==
The qualified teams are:

- Congo-Léopoldville
- Ethiopia
- Ghana (holders)
- Ivory Coast
- Senegal
- Tunisia (hosts)

== Group stage ==
=== Zone 1 ===
Originally, Egypt qualified by default after Morocco and Nigeria both withdrew, but Egypt later withdrew due to the deterioration of diplomatic relations with Tunisia following a speech in Jericho by Tunisian President Habib Bourguiba, who called on the Arab countries to recognise Israel.

=== Zone 2 ===
The match in Nairobi between Kenya and Ethiopia originally ended with Kenya winning 3–2, but Ethiopia lodged a protest with the Confederation of African Football (CAF) claiming Kenya had fielded two players (Moses Wabwayi and Stephen Baraza) who were ineligible as they had represented Uganda previously: the protest was upheld and Ethiopia were awarded a 2–0 victory, subsequently qualifying ahead of Sudan. CAF also suspended both players for one year (backdated to September 1964) after upholding a protest from Uganda that they were still registered with the Uganda F.A. and had not received official transfers.

Kenya argued against the ruling and sent documents to prove that the two were Kenyan citizens, having been born in Kenya, while the case was also referred to FIFA.

Team	Pld	W	D	L	GF	GA	GD	Pts
Ethiopia	6	5	0	1	10	4	+6	10
Sudan	6	4	1	1	14	7	+7	9
Kenya	6	1	1	4	8	12	−4	3
Uganda	6	1	0	5	6	15	−9	2

Source: RSSSF
14 February 1965

Kenya	3–2 0–2 (Awarded score)	Ethiopia
Madegwa 47', 85'		Fish; Worku

Nairobi City Stadium, Nairobi

21 February 1965

Uganda	1–2	Ethiopia
Kitonsa 63'		Wolde 47'; I. Vassalo 87'

Nakivubo Stadium, Kampala

27 February 1965

Kenya	3–0	Uganda
Chege 24', 89'; Madegwa 27'

Nairobi City Stadium, Nairobi

3 March 1965

Ethiopia	2–0	Uganda
Wolde 14'

Haile Selassie Stadium, Addis Ababa

13 March 1965

Uganda	3–1	Kenya
Kitonsa 65', 88'; Oundo 67'		Breik 35' (pen.)

Nakivubo Stadium, Kampala

27 March 1965

Sudan	2–1	Ethiopia
Hasabu Al-Kabeer; Jaksa		Worku

Municipal Stadium, Khartoum

4 April 1965

Ethiopia	2–1	Kenya
Vassalo 47'; Worku 61'		Madegwa 59'

Haile Selassie Stadium, Addis Ababa

11 April 1965

Sudan	4–2	Kenya
?' 40' 65' 78'		Madegwa; Rabuogi 50'

Municipal Stadium, Khartoum

18 April 1965

Ethiopia	1–0	Sudan
Wolde 56'

Haile Selassie Stadium, Addis Ababa

25 April 1965

Kenya	1–1	Sudan
Nicodemus 81'		Mustafa Shawish 68'

Nairobi City Stadium, Nairobi

1 May 1965

Uganda	1–3	Sudan
Kitonsa 72'		Jaksa 4', 75'; Jagdoul 37'

Nakivubo Stadium, Kampala

22 August 1965

Sudan	4–1	Uganda

Municipal Stadium, Khartoum

=== Zone 3 ===
Team	Pld	W	D	L	GF	GA	GD	Pts
Ivory Coast	4	3	0	1	9	4	+5	6
Congo-Léopoldville	4	2	0	2	8	8	0	4
Liberia	4	1	0	3	4	9	−5	2

Source: RSSSF
17 January 1965

Ivory Coast	2–0	Congo-Léopoldville
Déhi 69'; Bléziri 80'

Stade Félix Houphouët-Boigny, Abidjan

29 May 1965

Liberia	0–1	Ivory Coast

Antoinette Tubman Stadium, Monrovia

27 June 1965

Ivory Coast	4–0	Liberia

Stade Félix Houphouët-Boigny, Abidjan

14 August 1965

Liberia	2–1	Congo-Léopoldville

Antoinette Tubman Stadium, Monrovia

5 September 1965

Congo-Léopoldville	4–2	Ivory Coast

Stade Tata Raphaël, Léopoldville

21 September 1965

Congo-Léopoldville	3–2	Liberia

Stade Tata Raphaël, Léopoldville

=== Zone 4 ===
Team	Pld	W	D	L	GF	GA	GD	Pts
Senegal	4	3	0	1	8	4	+4	6
Guinea	4	2	0	2	6	6	0	4
Mali	4	1	0	3	4	8	−4	2

25 February 1965

Senegal	2–0	Guinea

Stade Demba Diop, Dakar

31 March 1965

Guinea	3–1	Senegal
Kandia; Souleymane ?		Goal

Stade du 28 Septembre, Conakry

18 April 1965

Mali	0–2	Senegal

Bamako

5 May 1965

Senegal	3–1	Mali
		S. Keïta 81'

Stade Demba Diop, Dakar

23 May 1965

Mali	2–1	Guinea

Bamako

6 June 1965

Guinea	2–1	Mali
		S. Keïta

Stade du 28 Septembre, Conakry

== Egypt's withdrawal ==
Following Egypt's withdrawal, CAF announced a playoff between the second-placed teams in the other three Zones to determine Egypt's replacement in the final tournament.

Following this announcement, Sudan declined CAF's invitation to participate, with a single playoff match being scheduled in Accra on 31 October between Congo-Léopoldville and Guinea.

However, Guinea withdrew shortly before this date; therefore, the playoff was scratched and Congo-Léopoldville qualified.
