= Football at the 1960 Summer Olympics – Men's African Qualifiers – Group 2 =

The 1960 Summer Olympics football qualification – Africa Group 2 was one of the three African groups in the Summer Olympics football qualification tournament to decide which teams would qualify for the Football at the 1960 Summer Olympics finals tournament in Italy. Group 2 consisted of three teams: Nigeria, Tunisia and United Arab Republic. The teams played against each other home-and-away in a round-robin format. The group winners, United Arab Republic, qualified for the second round.

== Standings ==
| Pos | Team | Pld | W | D | L | GF | GA | GD | Pts | Qualification | United Arab Republic | Ghana | Nigeria |
|---|---|---|---|---|---|---|---|---|---|---|---|---|---|
| 1 | United Arab Republic | 4 | 3 | 0 | 1 | 11 | 5 | +6 | 6 | Advance to second round | — | 2–1 | 3–0 |
| 2 | Ghana | 4 | 2 | 0 | 2 | 8 | 6 | +2 | 4 | | 2–0 | — | 4–1 |
| 3 | Nigeria | 4 | 1 | 0 | 3 | 6 | 14 | −8 | 2 | | 2–6 | 2–6 | — |

Source: RSSSF

== Matches ==
10 October 1959

| Nigeria | 3–1 | Ghana |
|---|---|---|
| Onyeali ?', ?'; Ohiri ?' | Report | Salisu ?' |

Onikan Stadium, Lagos

25 October 1959

| Ghana | 4–1 | Nigeria |
|---|---|---|
| Acquah ?', ?', ?', ?' | Report | Onyeali ?' |

Accra Sports Stadium, Accra
Attendance: 30,000

13 November 1959

| United Arab Republic | 2–1 | Ghana |
|---|---|---|
| Ateya 47', 60' | Report | Aggrey-Fynn ?' |

Al Ahly Stadium, Cairo
Attendance: 50,000

6 December 1959

| Ghana | 2–0 | United Arab Republic |
|---|---|---|
| Acquah 85', 87' | Report |

Accra Sports Stadium, Accra

13 December 1959

| Nigeria | 2–6 | United Arab Republic |
|---|---|---|
| Onyeali 3', 51' | Report | Nnado 1' (o.g.); Selim 46', 51'; Ismail 53'; Ateya 65'; Abdel Fattah 78' |

Onikan Stadium, Lagos
Attendance: 20,000
Referee: Giulio Campanati (Italy)

1 January 1960

| United Arab Republic | 3–0 | Nigeria |
|---|---|---|
| Ismail 9'; Abdel Fattah 17'; Mimi ?' | Report |

Al Ahly Stadium, Cairo

== Goalscorers ==
There were 25 goals scored in 6 matches, for an average of 4.17 goals per match.

6 goals

- (Ghana national football team) Edward Acquah

5 goals

- (Nigeria national football team) Elkanah Onyeali

3 goals

- (Egypt national football team) Raafat Attia

2 goals

- (Egypt national football team) Hamdi Abdel Fattah
- (Egypt national football team) Taha Ismail
- (Egypt national football team) Saleh Selim

1 goal

- (Nigeria national football team) Christopher Ohiri
- (Ghana national football team) Edward Aggrey-Fynn
- (Ghana national football team) Mohammadu Salisu
- (Egypt national football team) Mimi El-Sherbini

1 own goal

- (Nigeria national football team) Isaac Nnado (against United Arab Republic)
