= Football at the 1960 Summer Olympics – Men's African Qualifiers – Second round =

International football competition

Tournament details
- Dates: 14 February – 22 April 1960
- Teams: 3

Tournament statistics
- Matches played: 6
- Goals scored: 11 (1.83 per match)

The second round of African matches for the 1960 Summer Olympics football qualification was played from 14 February to 22 April 1960.

== Qualified teams ==
Bolded teams qualified for the Summer Olympics.

- Sudan
- **Tunisia**
- **United Arab Republic**

== Standings ==
Pos	Team	Pld	W	D	L	GF	GA	GD	Pts	Qualification	United Arab Republic	Tunisia	Sudan
1	United Arab Republic	4	3	1	0	7	1	+6	**7**	Qualification for 1960 Summer Olympics	—	3–1	3–0
2	Tunisia	4	1	1	2	3	4	−1	**3**	Qualification for 1960 Summer Olympics	0–0	—	2–0
3	Sudan	4	1	0	3	1	6	−5	**2**		0–1	1–0	—

Source: RSSSF

== Matches ==
14 February 1960

Sudan	1–0	Tunisia
Altoum ?'	Report

Khartoum Stadium, Khartoum

19 February 1960

United Arab Republic	3–1	Tunisia
Redha 50'; Abdel Fattah 71', 89'	Report	Karmous 60'

Al Ahly Stadium, Cairo

26 February 1960

Sudan	0–1	United Arab Republic
	Report	El-Hamouly 77' (pen.)

Khartoum Stadium, Khartoum

3 April 1960

Tunisia	0–0	United Arab Republic
	Report

Stade Géo André, Tunis

17 April 1960

Tunisia	2–0	Sudan
Diwa 10'; Karmous 79'	Report

Stade Géo André, Tunis

22 April 1960

United Arab Republic	3–0	Sudan
Abdel Fattah 22'; El-Fanagily 48'; Redha 65'	Report

Al Ahly Stadium, Cairo

== Goalscorers ==
There were 11 goals scored in 6 matches, for an average of 1.83 goals per match.

3 goals

- (Egypt national football team) Hamdi Abdel Fattah

2 goals

- (Tunisia national football team) Saâd Karmous
- (Egypt national football team) Mohamed Morsi Hussein

1 goal

- (Sudan national football team) Omer Altoum
- (Tunisia national football team) Noureddine Diwa
- (Egypt national football team) Rifaat El-Fanagily
- (Egypt national football team) Alaa El-Hamouly
