= Nigeria national football team results (1949–1959) =

- Win Draw Loss

== 1949 ==
10 August 1949 Friendly	Sierra Leone	0–2	Nigeria	Freetown, Sierra Leone
		Record	(Goalscorer records not available) -', -'

== 1950 ==
16 October 1950 Friendly	Gold Coast	1–0	Nigeria	Accra, Gold Coast
	(Goalscorer records not available) -'	Record

== 1954 ==
11 October 1954 Friendly	Gold Coast	1–0	Nigeria	Accra, Gold Coast
	(Goalscorer records not available) -'	Record

== 1955 ==
28 May 1955 Friendly	Gold Coast	1–0	Nigeria	Accra, Gold Coast
	(Goalscorer records not available) -'	Record

1 June 1955 Friendly	Gold Coast	7–0	Nigeria	Accra, Gold Coast
	(Goalscorer records not available) -', -', -', -', -', -', -'	Record

== 1956 ==
30 September 1956 Friendly	Nigeria	1–1	(United Kingdom) British Togoland	Lagos, Nigeria
	Onyeanwuna -'	Record	(Goalscorer records not available) -'	Stadium: Stade Surulere

27 October 1956 Friendly	Nigeria	3–0	Gold Coast	Lagos, Nigeria
	Okwudili -'; Longe -'; Ejoh -'	Record		Stadium: Stade Surulere

== 1957 ==
27 October 1957 Friendly	Ghana	3–3	Nigeria	Accra, Ghana
	(Goalscorer records not available) -', -', -'	Record	Noquapor -', -'; Ijeomah -'

== 1958 ==
31 July 1958 Friendly	Nigeria	3–2	Ghana	Lagos, Nigeria
	(Goalscorer records not available) -', -', -'	Record	(Goalscorer records not available) -', -'	Stadium: Stade Surulere

== 1959 ==
8 November 1959 Nkrumah Cup	Dahomey	0–1	Nigeria	Cotonou, Dahomey
		Record	(Goalscorer records not available) -'

21 November 1959 Jalco Cup	Ghana	5–2	Nigeria	Accra, Ghana
	Baba Yara -'; Mohammed Salisu -', -'; Charles Kumi Gyamfi -' (Goalscorer not recorded) -'	Record; Record	Noquapor -'; Onyeali -'

28 November 1959 Nkrumah Cup	Nigeria	10–1	Dahomey	Lagos, Nigeria
	(Goalscorer records not available) -', -', -', -', -', -', -', -', -', -'	Record	(Goalscorer records not available) -'	Stadium: Stade Surulere
