= Football at the 1960 Summer Olympics – Men's African Qualifiers – Group 3 =

The 1960 Summer Olympics football qualification – Africa Group 3 was one of the three African groups in the Summer Olympics football qualification tournament to decide which teams would qualify for the Football at the 1960 Summer Olympics finals tournament in Italy. Group 3 consisted of three teams: Ethiopia, Sudan and Uganda. The teams played against each other home-and-away in a round-robin format. The group winners, Sudan, qualified for the second round.

== Standings ==
Pos	Team	Pld	W	D	L	GF	GA	GD	Pts	Qualification	Sudan	Ethiopia	Uganda Protectorate
1	Sudan	4	3	1	0	6	2	+4	7	Advance to second round	—	3–1	1–0
2	Ethiopia	4	1	2	1	5	6	−1	4		1–1	—	1–1
3	Uganda	4	0	1	3	2	5	−3	1		0–1	1–2	—

Source: RSSSF

== Matches ==
14 November 1959

Uganda	1–2	Ethiopia
Kasigwa ?' (pen.)	Report

Nakivubo Stadium, Kampala

23 November 1959

Sudan	3–1	Ethiopia
Hasabu Al-Kabeer ?'; Dareesa ?'; Alzubir ?'	Report

Municipal Stadium, Khartoum

9 December 1959

Sudan	1–0	Uganda
Alzubir ?'	Report

Municipal Stadium, Khartoum

13 December 1959

Ethiopia	1–1	Uganda
	Report

Addis Ababa Stadium, Addis Ababa

20 December 1959

Ethiopia	1–1	Sudan
	Report	Dareesa ?'

Addis Ababa Stadium, Addis Ababa

3 January 1960

Uganda	0–1	Sudan
	Report	Alzubir ?'

Nakivubo Stadium, Kampala
