= Mauritius national football team results (1947–1968) =

The following is a list of matches played by the Mauritius national football team from 1947 to 1968. Since Mauritius became an independent nation in 1968, these results were all played while Mauritius was still owned by the United Kingdom. Mauritius won their first 17 games in a row, only playing in the Indian Ocean Games Triangulaire. They won 10 of 13 triangulaire tournaments, playing only Réunion and Madagascar until 1967.

== Triangulaire ==
Mauritius won the Triangulaire eight years in a row from 1947 to 1954, then again in 1956 and 1957. They won 10 times and were the most successful team. They came in second in 1955 and 1958, and came in third in 1963. The triangulaire was where Mauritius had their first game, their first win, and their biggest win. Mauritius won their first 17 games in a row, achieving an ELO ranking of 22

=== Final positions ===
Team	Champions	Runners-up	Third-place
Mauritius	10	2	1
Madagascar	3	7	3
Réunion		4	9

=== Record vs. other teams ===
Opponent	Played	Won	Drew	Lost	GF	GA	GD
Madagascar	13	9	2	2	46	17	+29
Réunion	13	12	0	1	78	16	+62
Total	26	21	2	3	126	33	+91

== Key ==
Win Draw Loss

== 1940s ==
=== 1947 ===
July 1947 1947 Triangulaire	Mauritius	2 — 1	Réunion	Madagascar
		Report

This was Mauritius's first result and their first win.

July 1947 1947 Triangulaire	Madagascar	1 — 2	Mauritius	Madagascar
		Report

=== 1948 ===
July 1948 1948 Triangulaire	Mauritius	5 — 1	Réunion	Mauritius
		Report

July 1948 1948 Triangulaire	Madagascar	1 — 4	Mauritius	Mauritius
		Report

=== 1949 ===
July 1949 1949 Triangulaire	Réunion	0 — 6	Mauritius	Réunion
		Report

July 1949 1949 Triangulaire	Mauritius	3 — 1	Madagascar	Réunion
		Report

== 1950s ==
=== 1950 ===
July 1950 1950 Triangulaire	Mauritius	15 — 2	Réunion	Madagascar
		Report

This is Mauritius's biggest win to date.

July 1950 1950 Triangulaire	Madagascar	1 — 5	Mauritius	Madagascar
		Report

=== 1951 ===
July 1951 1951 Triangulaire	Mauritius	10 — 2	Réunion	Mauritius
		Report

July 1951 1951 Triangulaire	Mauritius	7 — 1	Madagascar	Mauritius
		Report

=== 1952 ===
July 27, 1952 1952 Triangulaire	Réunion	0 — 6	Mauritius	Réunion
		Report

July 31, 1952 1952 Triangulaire	Mauritius	7 — 0	Madagascar	Réunion
		Report

=== 1953 ===
July 13, 1953 1953 Triangulaire	Mauritius	9 — 4	Réunion	Madagascar
		Report

July 20, 1953 1953 Triangulaire	Madagascar	2 — 3	Mauritius	Madagascar
		Report

=== 1954 ===
July 11, 1954 1954 Triangulaire	Mauritius	11 — 0	Réunion	Mauritius
		Report

July 14, 1954 1954 Triangulaire	Mauritius	4 — 1	Madagascar	Mauritius
		Report

=== 1955 ===
July 7, 1955 1955 Triangulaire	Réunion	1 — 3	Mauritius	Réunion
		Report

July 14, 1955 1955 Triangulaire	Mauritius	1 — 2	Madagascar	Réunion
		Report

This was Mauritius's first loss, breaking a 17-game winning streak.

=== 1956 ===
June 30, 1956 1956 Triangulaire	Mauritius	8 — 3	Réunion	Madagascar
		Report

July 8, 1956 1956 Triangulaire	Madagascar	3 — 3	Mauritius	Madagascar
		Report

This was Mauritius's first draw.

=== 1957 ===
April 17, 1957 Friendly	Mauritius	1 — 0	Réunion	Mauritius
		Report

October 24, 1957 1957 Triangulaire	Mauritius	4 — 0	Madagascar	Mauritius
		Report

October 27, 1957 1957 Triangulaire	Mauritius	1 — 0	Réunion	Mauritius
		Report

=== 1958 ===
October 16, 1958 1958 Triangulaire	Réunion	0 — 2	Mauritius	Réunion
		Report

October 23, 1958 1958 Triangulaire	Mauritius	2 — 3	Madagascar	Réunion
		Report

== 1960s ==
=== 1963 ===
September 8, 1963 1963 Triangulaire	Mauritius	0 — 2	Réunion	Madagascar
		Report

September 18, 1963 1963 Triangulaire	Mauritius	1 — 1*	Madagascar	Madagascar
		Report

*Abandoned at 1-1 at 54'

=== 1967 ===
August 9, 1967 1968 ACON qual	Mauritius	1 — 1	Tanzania	Mauritius
		Report

August 16, 1967 1968 ACON qual	Tanzania	1 — 0	Mauritius	Tanzania
		Report

November 25, 1967 Friendly	Rhodesia	1 — 2	Mauritius	Rhodesia
		Report

November 26, 1967 Friendly	Rhodesia	2 — 3	Mauritius	Rhodesia
		Report

=== 1968 ===
November 17, 1968 1970 ACON qual	Zambia	2 — 2	Mauritius	Zambia
		Report

December 8, 1968 1970 ACON qual	Mauritius	3 — 2	Zambia	Zambia
		Report
