= 1963 African Cup of Nations qualification =

Football tournament

This page details the process of qualifying for the 1963 African Cup of Nations. 10 African nations initially entered the competition. Ghana and Ethiopia both automatically qualified as the host country and title holders respectively. Uganda would withdraw before play began, thus leaving only 7 teams vying for the remaining four spots in the finals.

== Qualified teams ==
The 6 qualified teams are:

- United Arab Republic
- Ethiopia (holders)
- Ghana (hosts)
- Nigeria
- Sudan
- Tunisia

== Summary ==
The 8 nations were paired 2-by-2 and played knock-out matches home-and-away. The 4 winners would then qualify for the finals. Qualifying took place between 1 June 1963 and 6 October 1963.

== Qualification matches ==
Team 1	Agg.	Team 2	1st leg	2nd leg
Tunisia	6–5	Morocco	4–1	2–4
United Arab Republic	w/o	Uganda	—	—
Kenya	0–6	Sudan	0–1	0–5
Nigeria	2–3 (Note: Guinea was later disqualified for not providing neutral officials for the second leg: Nigeria qualified.)	Guinea	2–2	0–1

16 June 1963

Tunisia	4–1	Morocco
Henia 22', 57'; Aleya 85'; Jedidi 88'		Mokhtatif 75'

Stade Géo André, Tunis
2 July 1963

Morocco	4–2	Tunisia
Khalfi 10'; Ben Dayan 46'; Bettache 59' (pen.); Akesbi 78'		Henia 84'; Jedidi 62'

Stade d'Honneur, Casablanca

Tunisia qualified by an aggregate score of 6–5.

United Arab Republic	w/o	Uganda

Uganda	w/o	United Arab Republic

Uganda withdrew; United Arab Republic qualified.

1 June 1963

Kenya	0–1	Sudan
		Weza

Nairobi City Stadium, Nairobi
30 June 1963

Sudan	5–0	Kenya
Majed; Altoum; Jaksa

Municipal Stadium, Khartoum

Sudan qualified by an aggregate score of 6–0.

27 July 1963

Nigeria	2–2	Guinea
Olatunji		Goal

Onikan Stadium, Lagos
6 October 1963

Guinea	1–0	Nigeria
Kandia

Stade du 28 Septembre, Conakry

Guinea were disqualified for not providing neutral officials for the second leg; Nigeria qualified.
