= 1963 African Cup of Nations =

4th edition of the Africa Cup of Nations

Tournament details
- Host country: Ghana
- Dates: 24 November – 1 December
- Teams: 6
- Venues: 2 (in 2 host cities)

Final positions
- Champions: Ghana (1st title)
- Runners-up: Sudan
- Third place: United Arab Republic
- Fourth place: Ethiopia

Tournament statistics
- Matches played: 8
- Goals scored: 33 (4.13 per match)
- Top scorer(s): (United Arab Republic) Hassan El-Shazly (6 goals)
- Best player: (United Arab Republic) Hassan El-Shazly

The 1963 African Cup of Nations was the fourth edition of the African Cup of Nations, the international football championship run by the Confederation of African Football (CAF). It was hosted by Ghana. The format was changed to two groups of three teams each, with the two group winners playing in the final, and the two runners-up competing in the third place match.

The final in Accra on 1 December saw hosts Ghana defeat Sudan 3–0 to win a first title. This marked the third consecutive edition of the African Cup to be won by the host nation.

This edition of the African Cup, along with the previous one, are to date the only ones to have a goals-per-game average of four or more.

== Qualified teams ==
Team	Qualified as	Qualified on	Previous appearances in tournament (Note: Bold indicates champion for that year, Italic indicates host.)
Ghana	Hosts		0 (debut)
Ethiopia	Holders	21 January 1962	3 (1957, 1959, **1962**)
United Arab Republic	1st round winners	25 January 1963	3 (**1957**, **1959**, 1962)
Sudan	1st round winners	30 June 1963	2 (1957, 1959)
Tunisia	1st round winners	2 July 1963	1 (1962)
Nigeria	1st round winners	6 October 1963	0 (debut)

== Venues ==
The competition was played in two venues in Accra and Kumasi.

Accra	1963 African Cup of Nations is located in Ghana
Accra Sports Stadium	1963 African Cup of Nations is located in Ghana
Capacity: **40,000**	1963 African Cup of Nations is located in Ghana
Kumasi	1963 African Cup of Nations is located in Ghana
Kumasi Sports Stadium	1963 African Cup of Nations is located in Ghana
Capacity: **40,500**	1963 African Cup of Nations is located in Ghana

== Group stage ==
=== Tiebreakers ===
If two or more teams finished level on points after completion of the group matches, the following tie-breakers were used to determine the final ranking:

1. Goal average in all group matches
2. Drawing of lots

=== Group A ===
Pos	Team	Pld	W	D	L	GF	GA	GAv	Pts	Qualification
1	Ghana (H)	2	1	1	0	3	1	3.000	**3**	Advance to final
2	Ethiopia	2	1	0	1	4	4	1.000	**2**	Advance to third place play-off
3	Tunisia	2	0	1	1	3	5	0.600	**1**	

Rules for classification: Group stage tiebreakers
(H) Hosts
24 November 1963

Ghana	1–1	Tunisia
Mfum 9'		Jedidi 36'

Accra Sports Stadium, Accra
Referee: Mahmoud Hussein Imam (United Arab Republic)

26 November 1963

Ghana	2–0	Ethiopia
Acquah

Accra Sports Stadium, Accra

28 November 1963

Ethiopia	4–2	Tunisia
Worku; Zeleke; Tesfaye (Note: The sources differ in recording the scorers in that match. Other alternatives were that Ethiopian scorers were Worku, Getachew Wolde, and a brace by Luciano Vassalo, or Italo Vassalo, L. Vassalo and a brace by Worku. Meanwhile, Tunisian scorers were also given as Jedidi and Raouf Ben Amor, or Chetali and Hammadi Henia, or a brace for Henia.)		Chetali 15'; Jedidi 67'

Accra Sports Stadium, Accra

=== Group B ===
Pos	Team	Pld	W	D	L	GF	GA	GAv	Pts	Qualification
1	Sudan	2	1	1	0	6	2	3.000	**3 (Note: Sudan progress on goal average.)**	Advance to final
2	United Arab Republic	2	1	1	0	8	5	1.600	**3**	Advance to third place play-off
3	Nigeria	2	0	0	2	3	10	0.300	**0**	

Rules for classification: Group stage tiebreakers
Notes:
24 November 1963

United Arab Republic	6–3	Nigeria
Reda 30', 32', 82'; El-Shazly 42', 44', 81'		Ekpe 78'; Bassey 82'; Onyeawuna 89'

Kumasi Sports Stadium, Kumasi

26 November 1963

United Arab Republic	2–2	Sudan
El-Shazly 5'; Reda 7'		Jaksa 60', 75'

Kumasi Sports Stadium, Kumasi

28 November 1963

Sudan	4–0	Nigeria
Jaksa; Al-Kawarti; Weza

Kumasi Sports Stadium, Kumasi

== Knockout stage ==
=== Third place match ===
30 November 1963

United Arab Republic	3–0	Ethiopia
El-Shazly 6', 9'; Yaqoub 56'

Accra Sports Stadium, Accra

=== Final ===
1 December 1963

Ghana	3–0	Sudan
Aggrey-Fynn 62' (pen.); Acquah 72', 82'

Accra Sports Stadium, Accra
Referee: Hédi Ben Abdelkader (Tunisia)

== Goalscorers ==
There were 33 goals scored in 8 matches, for an average of 4.12 goals per match.

6 goals

- (United Arab Republic) Hassan El-Shazly

4 goals

- (Ghana) Edward Acquah
- (Sudan) Nasr Eddin "Jaksa" Abbas
- (United Arab Republic) Reda

2 goals

- (Ethiopia) Mengistu Worku
- (Tunisia) Mohamed Salah Jedidi

1 goal

- (Ghana) Edward Aggrey-Fynn
- (Ghana) Wilberforce Mfum
- (Sudan) Ebrahim Yahia Al-Kawarti
- (Sudan) Abdelaziz Weza
- (United Arab Republic) Ezz El-Din Yaqoub
- (Ethiopia) Gebremedhin Tesfaye
- (Ethiopia) Girma Zeleke
- (Tunisia) Abdelmajid Chetali
- (Nigeria) Joseph Bassey
- (Nigeria) Asuquo Ekpe
- (Nigeria) Albert Onyeawuna
