= 1970 African Cup of Nations qualification =

Football tournament

This page details the process of qualifying for the 1970 African Cup of Nations.

== Qualifying tournament ==
=== First round ===
Team 1	Agg.	Team 2	1st leg	2nd leg
Zambia	5–4	Mauritius	2–2	3–2
Uganda	2–3	Cameroon	2–1	0–2
Kenya	1–2	Tanzania	0–1	1–1
Algeria	2–1	Morocco	2–0	0–1
Guinea	5–1	Togo	4–0	1–1
Niger	w/o	Nigeria	—	—
Senegal	w/o	Sierra Leone	—	—
United Arab Republic	w/o	Somalia	—	—
Mali	w/o	Upper Volta	—	—

17 November 1968

Zambia	2–2	Mauritius
Chitalu 70' (pen.); Kapengwe 87'		Tostée 3'; Desvaux 13'

Lusaka
8 December 1968

Mauritius	2–3 (a.e.t.)	Zambia
Glover 18' (pen.); Desvaux 37'		Kalimukwa 39'; Simutowe 80'; Chitalu 120'

Stade George V, Curepipe

Zambia won 5–4 on aggregate.

2 February 1969

Uganda	2–1	Cameroon
Wasswa 17', 90'		Atangana 10'

Nakivubo Stadium, Kampala
2 March 1969

Cameroon	2–0	Uganda
Atangana 43', 57'

Yaoundé

Cameroon won 3–2 on aggregate.

16 February 1969

Kenya	0–1	Tanzania
		Choteka 40'

Nairobi City Stadium, Nairobi
1 March 1969

Tanzania	1–1	Kenya
Goal		Molo 70'

National Stadium, Dar es Salaam

Tanzania won 2–1 on aggregate.

9 March 1969

Algeria	2–0	Morocco
Kalem 10'; Natouri 20'

20 August Stadium, Algiers
Attendance: 20,000
Referee: Moncef Ben Ali (Tunisia)
22 March 1969

Morocco	1–0	Algeria
Mahroufi 83'

Stade Al Inbiaâte, Agadir
Attendance: 15,000
Referee: Moustapha N'Gom (Senegal)

Algeria won 2–1 on aggregate.

10 August 1969

Guinea	4–0	Togo
Souleymane ?

Stade du 28 Septembre, Conakry
24 August 1969

Togo	1–1	Guinea
Goal		Kandia

Stade Général Eyadema, Lomé

Guinea won 5–1 on aggregate.

Niger	Cancelled	Nigeria
		Withdrew

Niger progress, Nigeria withdrew.

Senegal	Cancelled	Sierra Leone
		Withdrew

Senegal progress, Sierra Leone withdrew.

United Arab Republic	Cancelled	Somalia
		Withdrew

United Arab Republic progress, Somalia withdrew.

Mali	Cancelled	Upper Volta
		Withdrew

Mali progress, Upper Volta withdrew.

=== Second round ===
Team 1	Agg.	Team 2	1st leg	2nd leg
Ethiopia	9–1	Tanzania	7–0	2–1
Zambia	3–4	Cameroon	2–2	1–2
Ghana	15–1	Niger	6–0	9–1
United Arab Republic	2–1	Algeria	1–0	1–1
Guinea	5–4	Senegal	4–3	1–1
Mali	0–4	Ivory Coast	0–0	0–4

25 May 1969

Ethiopia	7–0	Tanzania
Vassalo 19'; Asmerom 24', 51', 83'; Tewolde 25'; Abdo 70'; Asfaw 80'

Haile Selassie Stadium, Addis Ababa
31 May 1969

Tanzania	1–2	Ethiopia
Zimbwe		Vassalo; Tewolde

National Stadium, Dar es Salaam

Ethiopia won 9–1 on aggregate.

29 June 1969

Zambia	2–2	Cameroon
Ndhlovu 25'; Simutowe 65'		Confiance 60'; Atangana 75'

Dag Hammarskjöld Stadium, Ndola
Referee: ... (Zambia)
3 August 1969

Cameroon	2–1	Zambia
Confiance 56'; Owona 75' (pen.)		Chitalu 2'

Yaoundé

Cameroon won 4–3 on aggregate.

17 August 1969

Ghana	6–0	Niger
Owusu ?

Accra Sports Stadium, Accra
21 September 1969

Niger	1–9	Ghana
?		Owusu; Ankrah; Kofi

Niamey

Ghana won 15–1 on aggregate.

19 September 1969

United Arab Republic	1–0	Algeria
El-Shazly 58'

Cairo International Stadium, Cairo
Attendance: 40,000
Referee: ... (Tunisia)
28 September 1969

Algeria	1–1	United Arab Republic
Kalem 9'		El-Shazly 53'

20 August Stadium, Algiers
Attendance: 20,000
Referee: Mohamed Benjelloun (Morocco)

United Arab Republic won 2–1 on aggregate.

12 October 1969

Guinea	4–3	Senegal
Kandia ? ?		Goal

Stade du 28 Septembre, Conakry
26 October 1969

Senegal	1–1	Guinea
?		Thiam 9'

Stade Demba Diop, Dakar

Guinea won 5–4 on aggregate.

12 October 1969

Mali	0–0	Ivory Coast

Bamako
26 October 1969

Ivory Coast	4–0	Mali

Stade Félix Houphouët-Boigny, Abidjan

Côte d'Ivoire won 4–0 on aggregate.

== Qualified teams ==
The 8 qualified teams are:

- Cameroon
- Congo-Kinshasa (holders)
- Ethiopia
- Ghana
- Guinea
- Ivory Coast
- Sudan (hosts)
- United Arab Republic
