= United Arab Republic v Sudan (1959 African Cup of Nations) =

1959 African Cup of Nations Final
- Event: 1959 African Cup of Nations
United Arab Republic	Sudan
(United Arab Republic)	(Sudan)
2	1
- Date: 29 May 1959
- Venue: Prince Farouk Stadium, Cairo
- Referee: Zivko Bajic (Yugoslavia)
- Attendance: 30,000

United Arab Republic v Sudan was the decisive match of group stage at the 1959 African Cup of Nations. The match was played at the Prince Farouk Stadium in Cairo on 29 May 1959. Unlike other editions, the 1959 winner was determined by a group stage, with three teams playing in round-robin format, instead of a knockout stage. This was the first edition to feature a final group stage and one of two, alongside the 1976 African Cup of Nations, to promote this format.

Both teams had defeated Ethiopia but the goal difference was in favour of United Arab Republic, who had beaten Ethiopia 4–0 while Sudan had won 1–0. Therefore, Sudan needed to win the last match to claim the title of champions of Africa; any other result would have the United Arab Republic retain the title they had won (as Egypt) in 1957.

United Arab Republic beat Sudan 2–1, therefore keeping first place in the group and winning their second consecutive title.

== Background ==
The road to the title in the 1959 Africa Cup of Nations was unique, with a round-robin group instead of a knockout stage. The three competition teams were United Arab Republic (host country), Sudan and Ethiopia.

United Arab Republic and Sudan won their matches against Ethiopia, United Arab Republic by 4–0 to top the group, ahead of Sudan who won by 1–0.

Positions before the final round
Team	Pld	W	D	L	GF	GA	GD	Pts
United Arab Republic	1	1	0	0	4	0	+4	2
Sudan	1	1	0	0	1	0	+1	2
Ethiopia	2	0	0	2	0	5	−5	0

== Match ==
=== Match details ===
29 May 1959

United Arab Republic	2–1	Sudan
Baheeg 12', 89'		Manzul 65'

Prince Farouk Stadium, Cairo
Attendance: 30,000
Referee: Živko Bajić (Yugoslavia)

United Arab Republic	Sudan

GK	Adel Hekal
RB	Tarek Selim
CB	Yaken Hussein
CB	Rifaat El-Fanagily
LB	Taha Ismail
RM	Mimi El-Sherbini
CM	Mahmoud El-Gohary
CM	Sherif El-Far
LM	Saleh Selim
CF	Essam Baheeg
CF	Alaa El-Hamouly
Manager:
(Hungary) Pál Titkos

GK	Samir Mohammed Ali
RB	Ahmed Mutawakil Mohammed El-Bashir
CB	Hassan Mohammed Al-Abd
LB	Ibrahim Mohammed Ali 'Ibrahim El-Kabir'
RH	Abbas Al-Hedi Syam
LH	Suleiman Difalla Al-Mahina
OR	Mahmoud Abd Zoubeir
IR	Boraî Bashir
CF	Mutalib Abdel-Nasser 'Drissa'
IL	Siddiq Manzul
OL	Abdullah Wahaga
Manager:
(Hungary) József Háda

== Aftermath ==
Final positions
Team	Pld	W	D	L	GF	GA	GD	Pts
United Arab Republic	2	2	0	0	6	1	+5	4
Sudan	2	1	0	1	2	2	0	2
Ethiopia	2	0	0	2	0	5	−5	0
