= 1970 African Cup of Nations =

7th edition of the Africa Cup of Nations

1970 كأس أمم أفريقيا

Tournament details
- Host country: Sudan
- Dates: 6–16 February
- Teams: 8
- Venues: 2 (in 2 host cities)

Final positions
- Champions: Sudan (1st title)
- Runners-up: Ghana
- Third place: United Arab Republic
- Fourth place: Ivory Coast

Tournament statistics
- Matches played: 16
- Goals scored: 51 (3.19 per match)
- Attendance: 146,858 (9,179 per match)
- Top scorer(s): (Ivory Coast) Laurent Pokou (8 goals)
- Best player: (Ivory Coast) Laurent Pokou

The 1970 African Cup of Nations was the seventh edition of the African Cup of Nations, the international football championship run by the Confederation of African Football (CAF). It was hosted by Sudan. Just like in 1968, the field of eight teams was split into two groups of four. Sudan won its first championship, beating Ghana in the final 1−0.

The tournament marked the fourth final appearance in a row for Ghana.

== Qualified teams ==
The 8 qualified teams are:

Team	Qualified as	Qualified on	Previous appearances in tournament (Note: Bold indicates champion for that year, Italic indicates host.)
Sudan	Hosts		3 (1957, 1959, 1963)
Congo-Kinshasa	Holders	21 January 1968	2 (1965, **1968**)
Ethiopia	2nd round winners	31 May 1969	6 (1957, 1959, **1962**, 1963, 1965, 1968)
Cameroon	2nd round winners	3 August 1969	0 (debut)
Ghana	2nd round winners	21 September 1969	3 (**1963**, **1965**, 1968)
United Arab Republic	2nd round winners	28 September 1969	4 (**1957**, **1959**, 1962, 1963)
Ivory Coast	2nd round winners	26 October 1969	2 (1965, 1968)
Guinea	2nd round winners	26 October 1969	0 (debut)

== Venues ==
The competition was played in two venues in Khartoum and Wad Madani.

Khartoum	1970 African Cup of Nations is located in Sudan (2005-2011)
Municipal Stadium	1970 African Cup of Nations is located in Sudan (2005-2011)
Capacity: **30,000**	1970 African Cup of Nations is located in Sudan (2005-2011)
Wad Madani	1970 African Cup of Nations is located in Sudan (2005-2011)
Wad Madani Stadium	1970 African Cup of Nations is located in Sudan (2005-2011)
Capacity: **15,000**	1970 African Cup of Nations is located in Sudan (2005-2011)

== Group stage ==
=== Tiebreakers ===
If two or more teams finished level on points after completion of the group matches, the following tie-breakers were used to determine the final ranking:

1. Goal difference in all group matches
2. Greater number of goals scored in all group matches
3. Drawing of lots

=== Group A ===
Pos	Team	Pld	W	D	L	GF	GA	GD	Pts	Qualification
1	Ivory Coast	3	2	0	1	9	4	+5	**4 (Note: Tied on overall points. Overall goal difference: Ivory Coast +5, Sudan +3, Cameroon +1.)**	Advance to knockout stage
2	Sudan (H)	3	2	0	1	5	2	+3	**4**	Advance to knockout stage
3	Cameroon	3	2	0	1	7	6	+1	**4**	
4	Ethiopia	3	0	0	3	3	12	−9	**0**	

Rules for classification: Group stage tiebreakers
(H) Hosts
Notes:
6 February 1970

Cameroon	3–2	Ivory Coast
Koum 57', 66'; N'Doga 60'		Pokou 25', 45'

Municipal Stadium, Khartoum
Attendance: 14,464
Referee: Mahmoud (Egypt)
6 February 1970

Sudan	3–0	Ethiopia
Gagarin 43'; Hasabu El-Sagheer 47'; Jaksa 85'

Municipal Stadium, Khartoum
Attendance: 14,464
Referee: Faber (Guinea)

8 February 1970

Cameroon	3–2	Ethiopia
Tsébo 21'; Manga-Onguéné 43'; N'Doga 70'		Mengistu 12', 75'

Municipal Stadium, Khartoum
Attendance: 9,864
Referee: Quarshie (Ghana)
8 February 1970

Ivory Coast	1–0	Sudan
Tahi 89'

Municipal Stadium, Khartoum
Attendance: 9,864
Referee: Mahombé (Congo-Kinshasa)

10 February 1970

Ivory Coast	6–1	Ethiopia
Losseni 16'; Pokou 21', 60', 71', 80', 87'		Mengistu 33'

Municipal Stadium, Khartoum
Attendance: 9,770
Referee: Boukili (Morocco)
10 February 1970

Sudan	2–1	Cameroon
Jaksa 20'; Hasabu El-Sagheer 60'		Tsébo 34'

Municipal Stadium, Khartoum
Attendance: 9,770
Referee: Ngom (Senegal)

=== Group B ===
Pos	Team	Pld	W	D	L	GF	GA	GD	Pts	Qualification
1	United Arab Republic	3	2	1	0	6	2	+4	**5**	Advance to knockout stage
2	Ghana	3	1	2	0	4	2	+2	**4**	Advance to knockout stage
3	Guinea	3	0	2	1	4	7	−3	**2**	
4	Congo-Kinshasa	3	0	1	2	2	5	−3	**1**	

Rules for classification: Group stage tiebreakers
7 February 1970

Ghana	2–0	Congo-Kinshasa
Owusu 29', 32'

Wad Madani Stadium, Wad Medani
Attendance: 7,525
Referee: Obeid (Sudan)
7 February 1970

United Arab Republic	4–1	Guinea
Abo Greisha 5', 10'; El-Shazly 73' (pen.); Basry 66'		Soumah 25' (pen.)

Wad Madani Stadium, Wad Medani
Attendance: 7,525
Referee: Gebreyesus (Ethiopia)

9 February 1970

Congo-Kinshasa	2–2	Guinea
Kalonzo 70'; Mungamuni 72'		Petit Sory 5'; Soumah 55' (pen.)

Wad Madani Stadium, Wad Medani
Attendance: 3,342
Referee: Koudou (Ivory Coast)
9 February 1970

United Arab Republic	1–1	Ghana
Bazooka 70'		Sunday 60'

Wad Madani Stadium, Wad Medani
Attendance: 3,342
Referee: Kandem (Cameroon)

11 February 1970

Guinea	1–1	Ghana
Thiam 10'		Owusu 50'

Wad Madani Stadium, Wad Medani
Attendance: 3,927
Referee: Khelifi (Algeria)
11 February 1970

United Arab Republic	1–0	Congo-Kinshasa
Abo Greisha 71'

Wad Madani Stadium, Wad Medani
Attendance: 3,927
Referee: Simfukwe (Zimbabwe)

== Knockout stage ==
=== Bracket ===
Semi-finals
14 February – Khartoum
Ivory Coast	1
**Ghana (a.e.t.)**	**2**
14 February – Khartoum
United Arab Republic	1
**Sudan (a.e.t.)**	**2**

Final
16 February – Khartoum
Ghana	0
**Sudan**	**1**
Third place
16 February – Khartoum
Ivory Coast	1
**United Arab Republic**	**3**

=== Semi-finals ===
14 February 1970

Ivory Coast	1–2 (a.e.t.)	Ghana
Losseni 78'		Sunday 21'; Jabir 100'

Municipal Stadium, Khartoum
Attendance: 12,350

14 February 1970

United Arab Republic	1–2 (a.e.t.)	Sudan
El-Shazly 84'		El-Asyad 83', 102'

Municipal Stadium, Khartoum
Attendance: 12,350

=== Third place match ===
16 February 1970

United Arab Republic	3–1	Ivory Coast
El-Shazly 3', 14', 50'		Pokou 72'

Municipal Stadium, Khartoum
Attendance: 12,187
Referee: Salih Mohamed Boukkili (Morocco)

=== Final ===
16 February 1970

Sudan	1–0	Ghana
Hasabu El-Sagheer 12'

Municipal Stadium, Khartoum
Attendance: 12,187
Referee: Gebreyesus Tesfaye (Ethiopia)

== Goalscorers ==
There were 51 goals scored in 16 matches, for an average of 3.19 goals per match.

8 goals

- (Ivory Coast) Laurent Pokou

5 goals

- (United Arab Republic) Hassan El-Shazly

3 goals

- (Ethiopia) Mengistu Worku
- (Ghana) Kwasi Owusu
- (Sudan) Hasabu El-Sagheer
- (United Arab Republic) Ali Abo Greisha

2 goals

- (Cameroon) Emmanuel Koum
- (Cameroon) Gaston Paul N'Doga
- (Cameroon) Jean-Marie Tsébo
- (Ivory Coast) Diomandé Losseni
- (Ghana) Ibrahim Sunday
- (Guinea) Soriba Soumah
- (Sudan) Jaksa
- (Sudan) Muhamad El-Basheer El-Asyad

1 goal

- (Cameroon) Jean Manga-Onguéné
- (Ivory Coast) François Tahi
- (Ghana) Malik Jabir
- (Guinea) Petit Sory
- (Guinea) Ousmane Tolo Thiam
- (Sudan) Ali Gagarin
- (Democratic Republic of the Congo) André Kalonzo
- (Democratic Republic of the Congo) Léon Mungamuni
- (United Arab Republic) Sayed Abdel Razek
- (United Arab Republic) Taha Basry

== Team of the Tournament ==
Goalkeeper	Defenders	Midfielders	Forwards
(Ghana) Robert Mensah	(Sudan) Samir Salih (Ghana) John Eshun (Sudan) Amin Zaki (United Arab Republic) Hany Moustafa	(Ivory Coast) Ernest Kallet Bialy (Ghana) Ibrahim Sunday (Ivory Coast) Bernard Gnahoré (Guinea) Maxime Camara	(Ivory Coast) Laurent Pokou (United Arab Republic) Ali Abo Gresha
