= Football at the 1960 Summer Olympics – Men's African Qualifiers – Group 1 =

The 1960 Summer Olympics football qualification – Africa Group 1 was one of the three African groups in the Summer Olympics football qualification tournament to decide which teams would qualify for the Football at the 1960 Summer Olympics finals tournament in Italy. Group 1 consisted of three teams: Malta, Morocco and Tunisia. The teams played against each other home-and-away in a round-robin format. The group winners, Tunisia, qualified for the second round.

== Standings ==
Pos	Team	Pld	W	D	L	GF	GA	GD	Pts	Qualification	Tunisia	Morocco	Malta
1	Tunisia	4	2	1	1	5	3	+2	5	Advance to second round	—	2–0	2–0
2	Morocco	4	2	1	1	7	6	+1	5		3–1	—	2–1
3	Malta	4	0	2	2	3	6	−3	2		0–0	2–2	—

Source: RSSSF

== Matches ==
1 November 1959

Malta	0–0	Tunisia
	Report

Empire Stadium, Gżira
Attendance: 10,937
Referee: Peter Kröner (Romania)

8 November 1959

Malta	2–2	Morocco
Dalli ?'; Mackay ?'	Report	Benchekroun 57'; Ben Abadenahan 73'

Empire Stadium, Gżira
Attendance: 11,748
Referee: Peter Kröner (Romania)

15 November 1959

Tunisia	2–0	Morocco
Henia 20', 32'	Report

Stade Géo André, Tunis
Attendance: 10,000

6 December 1959

Tunisia	2–0	Malta
Henia 51'; Braiek 88'	Report

Stade Géo André, Tunis
Attendance: 10,000

13 December 1959

Morocco	2–1	Malta
Machiche 13'; Mourchid 42'	Report	Dalli ?'

Stade Marcel Cerdan, Casablanca
Attendance: 5,000
Referee: Vicente Antonio Caballero (Spain)

27 December 1959

Morocco	3–1	Tunisia
Benchekroun 4', 73'; Mokhlatif 48'	Report	Neji 48'

Stade Marcel Cerdan, Casablanca
Attendance: 15,000

== Goalscorers ==
There were 15 goals scored in 6 matches, for an average of 2.5 goals per match.

3 goals

- (Morocco national football team) M. Ben Abadenahan
- (Tunisia national football team) Méjri Henia

2 goals

- (Malta Olympic football team) Billy Dalli

1 goal

- (Malta Olympic football team) Charles Mackay
- (Morocco national football team) A. Benchekroun
- (Morocco national football team) M. Machiche
- (Morocco national football team) A. Mokhlatif
- (Morocco national football team) A. Mourchid
- (Tunisia national football team) Hédi Braiek
- (Tunisia national football team) A. Neji
