= Nasr Eddin Abbas =

Sudanese footballer

Nasr Eddin Jaksa
Personal information
- Full name: Nasr Eddin Abbas Jackson
- Date of birth: 13 August 1944 (age 82)
- Place of birth: Omdurman, Khartoum state, Sudan
- Position: Forward

Youth career
- 1957–1960: Al-Mujahid FC

Senior career*
Years	Team	Apps	(Gls)
1960–1963	Al-Rabea Club		
1963–1977	Al-Hilal Club		

International career
1963–1972	Sudan	52	(27)

Managerial career
- 1977: Al-Hilal Club
- 1982–1983: Al-Hilal Club
Medal record
Men's football
Representing Sudan
Africa Cup of Nations
Winner	1970 Sudan
Runner-up	1963 Ghana
Arab Games
Silver medal – second place	1965 Cairo
- * Club domestic league appearances and goals

Nasr Eddin Abbas (Arabic: نصر الدين عباس; born 13 August 1944), known by his nickname Jaksa (Arabic: جكسة), is a Sudanese former footballer who played with Al-Hilal Club. He participated in the Africa Cup of Nations 1963 and 1970 and in 1972 Summer Olympics in Munich.

== International goals ==
Scores and results list Sudan's goal tally first, score column indicates score after each Abbas goal.

List of international goals scored by Nasr El-Din Abbas
No.	Date	Venue	Opponent	Score	Result	Competition
1	30 June 1963	Khartoum, Sudan	Kenya		5–0	1963 Africa Cup of Nations qualification
2	26 November 1963	Kumasi Sports Stadium, Kumasi, Ghana	United Arab Republic	1–2	2–2	1963 Africa Cup of Nations
3	26 November 1963	Kumasi Sports Stadium, Kumasi, Ghana	United Arab Republic	2–2	2–2	1963 Africa Cup of Nations
4	28 November 1963	Kumasi Sports Stadium, Kumasi, Ghana	Nigeria		4–0	1963 Africa Cup of Nations
5	28 November 1963	Kumasi Sports Stadium, Kumasi, Ghana	Nigeria		4–0	1963 Africa Cup of Nations
6	17 April 1964	Khartoum, Sudan	United Arab Republic		3–3	1964 Summer Olympics qualification
7	17 April 1964	Khartoum, Sudan	United Arab Republic		3–3	1964 Summer Olympics qualification
8	27 March 1965	Khartoum, Sudan	Ethiopia		2–1	1965 Africa Cup of Nations qualification
9	1 May 1965	Kampala, Uganda	Uganda	1–0	3–1	1965 Africa Cup of Nations qualification
10	1 May 1965	Kampala, Uganda	Uganda	3–1	3–1	1965 Africa Cup of Nations qualification
11	2 September 1965	Cairo, Egypt	(Sultanate of Lahej) Lahej		9–0	1965 Arab Games
12	2 September 1965	Cairo, Egypt	(Sultanate of Lahej) Lahej		9–0	1965 Arab Games
13	2 September 1965	Cairo, Egypt	(Sultanate of Lahej) Lahej		9–0	1965 Arab Games
14	2 September 1965	Cairo, Egypt	(Sultanate of Lahej) Lahej		9–0	1965 Arab Games
15	3 September 1965	Cairo, Egypt	Libya		4–2	1965 Arab Games
16	8 January 1969	Khartoum Stadium, Khartoum, Sudan	Kenya	1-0	1-0	Friendly
17.18	10 January 1969	Khartoum Stadium, Khartoum, Sudan	Tanzania	2-0	3-0	Friendly
19	13 September 1969	Liberty Stadium, Ibadan, Nigeria	Nigeria	1–2	2–2	1970 FIFA World Cup qualification
20	3 October 1969	Khartoum Stadium, Khartoum, Sudan	Nigeria	1–0	3–3	1970 FIFA World Cup qualification
21	6 February 1970	Khartoum Stadium, Khartoum, Sudan	Ethiopia	3–0	3–0	1970 Africa Cup of Nations
22	10 February 1970	Khartoum Stadium, Khartoum, Sudan	Cameroon	1–0	2–1	1970 Africa Cup of Nations
23	30 August 1972	Olympic Stadium, Munich, Germany	Soviet Union	1–2	1–2	1972 Summer Olympics

== Honours ==
Al-Hilal

- Sudan Premier League: 1965, 1966, 1969, 1973

Sudan

- African Cup of Nations: 1970 runner-up, 1963
- Arab Games silver medalist: 1965

Individual

- Best Sudanese player of the 20th century
