= Jazeerat Al-Feel SC =

Sudanese football club

- Full name: Jazeerat Al-Feel Sports Club
- Founded: 1936
- Ground: Stade Wad Medani, Wad Madani, Sudan
- Capacity: 5,000
- Manager: Tariq Amed Adm
- League: Sudan Premier League
- 2011: 12th
Home colours	Away colours

Jazeerat Al-Feel Sports Club (Arabic: نادي جزيرة الفيل الرياضي) is a Sudanese football club based in the city of Wad Madani. They played in the top division in Sudanese football, Sudan Premier League. Their home stadium is Stade Wad Medani.

Former logo

Present logo
