= Latifa al-Zayyat =

Egyptian activist and writer (1923–1996)

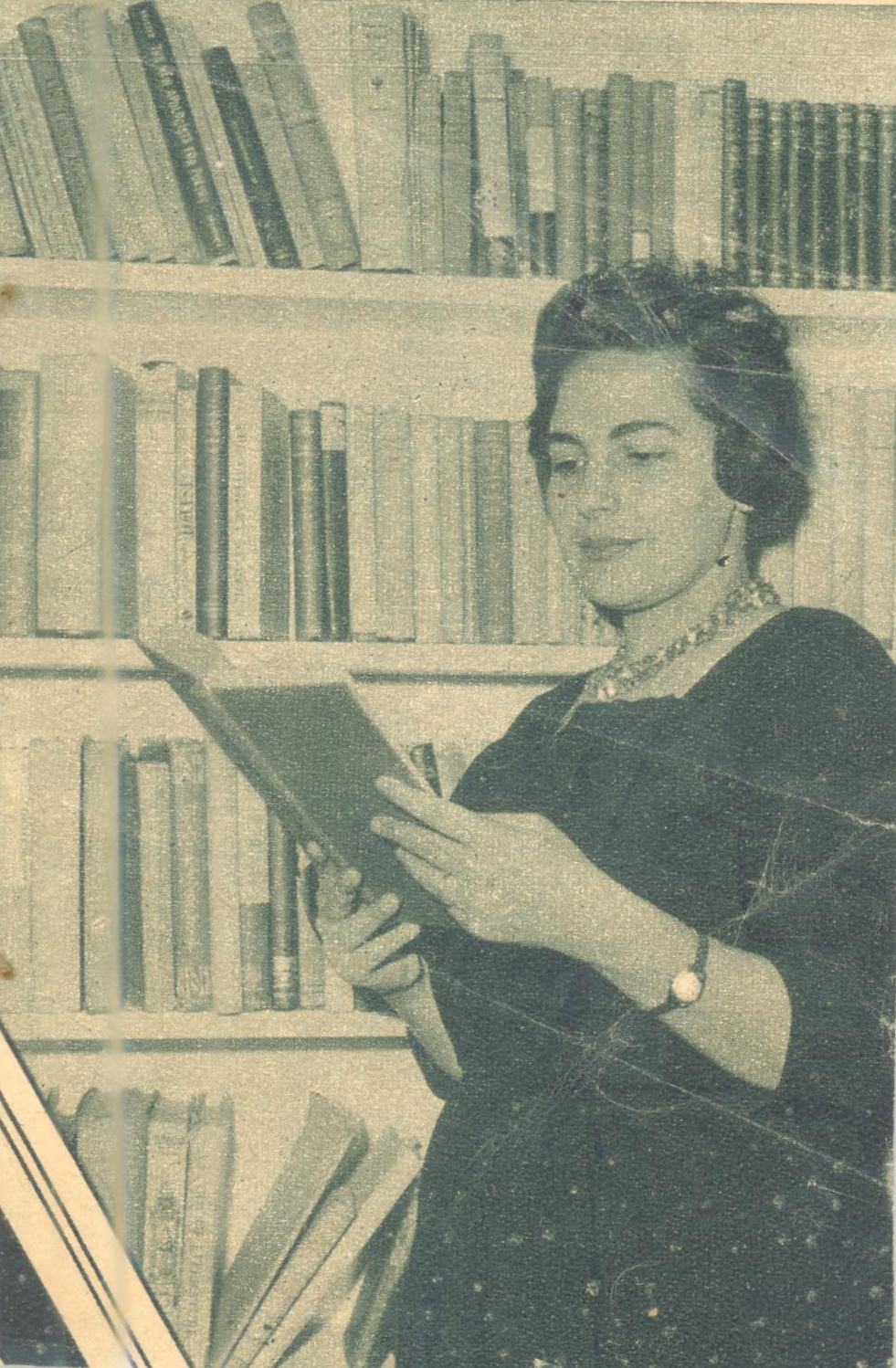
- Born: 8 August 1923; Dumyat, Kingdom of Egypt
- Died: 10 September 1996 (aged 73); Cairo, Egypt
- Education: Cairo University
- Known for: The Open Door; The Owner of the House

Latifa al-Zayyat (Arabic: لطيفة الزيات, romanized: Laṭīfah al-Zayyāt; 8 August 1923 – 10 September 1996) was an Egyptian activist and writer, most famous for her novel The Open Door, which won the inaugural Naguib Mahfouz Medal for Literature.

== Biography ==
Al Zayyat was born in Dumyat, Damietta, Egypt, on 8 August 1923. She earned her bachelor's degree in English in 1946 from Cairo University. She joined the communist Iskra group while attending her last grade at the University. She was arrested and detained in Hadra prison in 1949, during the student demonstrations against the British occupation of the country. In the same incident, her first husband was also arrested and imprisoned. Following her release from prison she earned her PhD at Cairo University in 1957. During the same period she worked for the leftist magazine Al Tali'a as its cultural editor.

She met Inji Efflatoun, a founding member in 1945 of the Rabitat Fatayat al jami'at wa al ma'ahid (The League of university and Institutes' Young Women) during her time in the university. She was a student activist as well. Al Zayyat was a professor of English at the Girls College of Ain Shams University and the chair of the department of English at the same university. She also served as the director of the Egyptian Arts Academy. She was again imprisoned in 1981, while she was heading the Committee for the Defense of National Culture which had been established in opposition to the Camp David accords.

Two of Al Zayyat's novels are translated to English, The Owner of the House and The Open Door. The latter, published in 1960, was strikingly modern for its time, both for its use of colloquial Egyptian Arabic and for its depiction of the main character's political and sexual awakening. The novel begins in 1946 and ends in 1956, with the Suez Crisis. It was also turned into a popular film of the same name released in 1963. Al-Zayyat also wrote many essays on women and critiques as well as reviews of novels and political happenings.

Al Zayyat died of cancer at age 73 in Cairo on 10 September 1996.

== Tribute ==
On 8 August 2015, Google dedicated a Doodle to the writer for the 92nd anniversary of her birth. The Doodle reached all the countries of the Arab World.
