= The Open Door (al-Zayyat novel) =

The English edition

The Open Door (Arabic: الباب المفتوح, romanized: al-Bāb al-Maftūḥ) is a 1960 novel by Egyptian writer Latifa al-Zayyat. It won the inaugural Naguib Mahfouz Medal for Literature. The novel, written in colloquial Egyptian Arabic explores a middle-class Egyptian girl's coming of age, against the background of the growing Egyptian nationalist movement before the 1952 Egypt revolution. The book was made into a 1963 Egyptian film directed by Henry Barakat with Faten Hamama, Mahmoud Moursy, and Saleh Selim.
