= Asuquo Ekpe =

Nigerian footballer (died 2016)

Personal information
- Full name: Asuquo Ekpe
- Date of death: 30 January 2016
- Place of death: Calabar, Nigeria
- Position: Forward

Senior career*
Years	Team	Apps	(Gls)
- Welch XI
1954–56	Lagos Railways II		
- Secretariat FC
- Ibadan Lions
- Western Rovers

International career
1956–1963	Nigeria	28	(14)
- * Club domestic league appearances and goals

Asuquo Ekpe (died 30 January 2016) was a Nigerian international footballer.

He made his international debut for Nigeria on 6 October 1956 against Togo. Ekpe became Nigeria's first goalscorer in an Africa Cup of Nations when he scored against United Arab Republic in the 1963 Africa Cup of Nations. Ekpe was the older sibling of Effiong Ekpe, he played alongside his brother for Nigeria several times during which times he was known as Ekpe Senior. In the match occurring on 2 February 1963 against Dahomey, they became the first siblings to play for Nigeria in the same game.

He died on 30 January 2016 in Calabar.
