= Ahmed Mohamed El-Bashir =

Sudanese footballer

Personal information
- Full name: Ahmed Mohamed El-Bashir Bakhit
- Date of birth: 27 August 1950 (age 76)

International career
Years	Team	Apps	(Gls)
- Sudan
Medal record
Men's football
Representing Sudan
Africa Cup of Nations
Winner	1970 Sudan

Ahmed Mohamed El-Bashir Bakhit (born 27 August 1950) is a Sudanese footballer. He competed in the men's tournament at the 1972 Summer Olympics.

== Honours ==
Sudan

- African Cup of Nations: 1970
