= The Open Door (1963 film) =

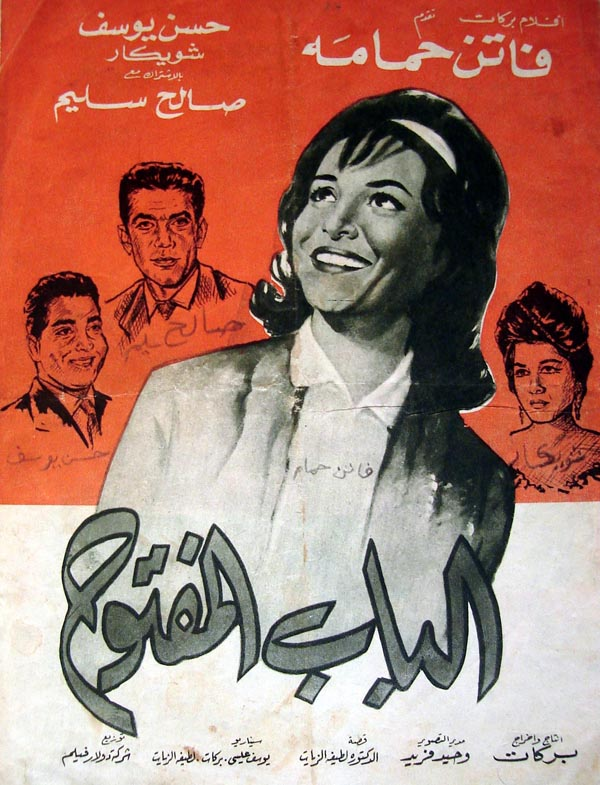
- Film poster
- Directed by: Henry Barakat
- Written by: Yussef Issa; Henry Barakat; Latifa al-Zayyat
- Based on: The Open Door by Latifa al-Zayyat
- Produced by: Henry Barakat
- Starring: Faten Hamama; Saleh Salim; Mahmoud Moursy
- Cinematography: Wahid Farid
- Music by: Andre Ryder
- Production company: Barakat Brothers Films
- Distributed by: Dollar Film
- Release date: 7 October 1963
- Running time: 102 minutes
- Country: Egypt
- Language: Egyptian Arabic

The Open Door (Arabic: الباب المفتوح, translit. El-Bab el-Maftuh) is a 1963 Egyptian drama film directed by Henry Barakat and starring Faten Hamama, Saleh Selim, and Mahmoud Moursy. The film was adapted from Egyptian writer Latifa al-Zayyat's 1960 novel of the same name and recipient of the inaugural Naguib Mahfouz Medal for Literature.

== Plot ==
Set in the 1950, The Open Door follows Layla, a young woman challenging societal norms and family expectations. Layla starts by joining a student protest against her father's conservative values, leading to conflicts at home. She is then pressured into an arranged marriage with her philosophy professor, highlighting the limited choices for women in that era. Throughout the film, Layla navigates various relationships while asserting her independence.

A turning point comes when Layla goes on a hunger strike to protest against her constrained life. Meanwhile, amidst political turmoil, Layla's personal journey reflects Egypt's broader social changes during the Suez Canal Crisis.

Ultimately, Layla finds love and support in Hussayn who respects her desire for autonomy and represents a hopeful future for her and women's rights in Egypt.

== Cast ==
- Faten Hamama as Layla Soulayman
- Saleh Selim as Hussayn Amer
- Mahmoud Moursy as Dr. Fouad
- Shwikar as Gamila
- Hassan Youssef as Essam
- Layla Anwar as Sanaa
- Mahmoud El-Heddini as Mahmoud Soulayman
- Nahed Samir as Layla's mother
- Ya'qoub Mikhail as Layla's father
