= Joseph Bassey =

Nigerian politician

Member of the House of Representatives of Nigeria
- In office May 2023 – incumbent
- Constituency: Akpabuyo/Bakassi/Calabar South

Personal details
- Party: All Progressives Congress
- Occupation: Politician

Joseph Bassey is a Nigerian politician who serves as a member of the House of Representatives, representing the Akpabuyo/Bakassi/Calabar South federal constituency of Cross River State. He was elected to the 10th National Assembly in the 2023 general election on the platform of the All Progressives Congress.

== Political career ==
Bassey was elected to the House of Representatives in May 2023 to represent the Akpabuyo/Bakassi/Calabar South federal constituency. He serves as Chairman of the House Committee on Disaster Management and Emergency Preparedness and has advocated for increased funding and modern equipment for the National Emergency Management Agency to improve disaster response nationwide.

== Community Development ==
In October 2025, Bassey organised a free medical outreach in collaboration with the Cross River State Government that provided essential healthcare services; including surgeries, eye examinations, and malaria and typhoid testing; to thousands of residents in his constituency.

He has also donated classroom facilities in Calabar South.

== See also ==
- House of Representatives of Nigeria
- National Assembly (Nigeria)
- List of members of the House of Representatives of Nigeria, 2023–2027
