= Football at the 1960 Summer Olympics – Men's African Qualifiers =

1960 Summer Olympics – Men's Football African Qualifiers
- Dates: 1 November 1959 – 22 April 1960

The Men's African Qualifiers for the 1960 Summer Olympics tournament began in November 1959 and ended in April 1960.

== First round ==
=== Group 1 ===
| Pos | Team | Pld | W | D | L | GF | GA | GD | Pts | Qualification | Tunisia | Morocco | Malta |
|---|---|---|---|---|---|---|---|---|---|---|---|---|---|
| 1 | Tunisia | 4 | 2 | 1 | 1 | 5 | 3 | +2 | 5 | Advance to second round | — | 2–0 | 2–0 |
| 2 | Morocco | 4 | 2 | 1 | 1 | 7 | 6 | +1 | 5 | | 3–1 | — | 2–1 |
| 3 | Malta | 4 | 0 | 2 | 2 | 3 | 6 | −3 | 2 | | 0–0 | 2–2 | — |

Source: RSSSF

=== Group 2 ===
| Pos | Team | Pld | W | D | L | GF | GA | GD | Pts | Qualification | United Arab Republic | Ghana | Nigeria |
|---|---|---|---|---|---|---|---|---|---|---|---|---|---|
| 1 | United Arab Republic | 4 | 3 | 0 | 1 | 11 | 5 | +6 | 6 | Advance to second round | — | 2–1 | 3–0 |
| 2 | Ghana | 4 | 2 | 0 | 2 | 8 | 6 | +2 | 4 | | 2–0 | — | 4–1 |
| 3 | Nigeria | 4 | 1 | 0 | 3 | 6 | 14 | −8 | 2 | | 2–6 | 2–6 | — |

Source: RSSSF

=== Group 3 ===
| Pos | Team | Pld | W | D | L | GF | GA | GD | Pts | Qualification | Sudan | Ethiopia | Uganda Protectorate |
|---|---|---|---|---|---|---|---|---|---|---|---|---|---|
| 1 | Sudan | 4 | 3 | 1 | 0 | 6 | 2 | +4 | 7 | Advance to second round | — | 3–1 | 1–0 |
| 2 | Ethiopia | 4 | 1 | 2 | 1 | 5 | 6 | −1 | 4 | | 1–1 | — | 1–1 |
| 3 | Uganda | 4 | 0 | 1 | 3 | 2 | 5 | −3 | 1 | | 0–1 | 1–2 | — |

Source: RSSSF

== Second round ==
| Pos | Team | Pld | W | D | L | GF | GA | GD | Pts | Qualification | United Arab Republic | Tunisia | Sudan |
|---|---|---|---|---|---|---|---|---|---|---|---|---|---|
| 1 | United Arab Republic | 4 | 3 | 1 | 0 | 7 | 1 | +6 | 7 | Qualification for 1960 Summer Olympics | — | 3–1 | 3–0 |
| 2 | Tunisia | 4 | 1 | 1 | 2 | 3 | 4 | −1 | 3 | Qualification for 1960 Summer Olympics | 0–0 | — | 2–0 |
| 3 | Sudan | 4 | 1 | 0 | 3 | 1 | 6 | −5 | 2 | | 0–1 | 1–0 | — |

Source: RSSSF
