= Hassan Hamdy =

Egyptian footballer (born 1949)

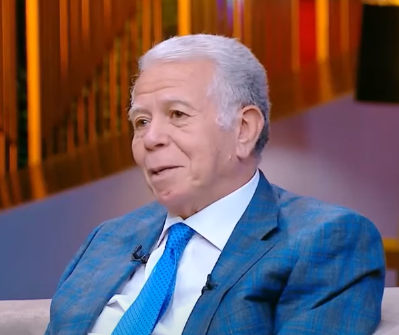
- Hassan Hamdy in 2021

16th President of Al-Ahly SC
- In office May 7, 2002 – March 28, 2014
- Preceded by: Saleh Selim
- Succeeded by: Mahmoud Taher
Association football career
- Full name: Mohamed Mahmoud Hamdy Ismail
- Date of birth: August 2, 1949 (age 77)
- Place of birth: Cairo, Egypt
- Position: Defender
Youth career
- 1962–1970: Al Ahly
Senior career*
Years	Team	Apps	(Gls)
1969–1978	Al Ahly	250	(15)
International career
1969–1977	Egypt		
- * Club domestic league appearances and goals

Mohamed Mahmoud Hamdy Ismail (Arabic: محمد محمود حمدي إسماعيل; born 2 August 1949), better known as Hassan Hamdy (Arabic: حسن حمدي), was the 12th and president of the Egyptian Al Ahly Sporting Club. He was the vice president of the club during Saleh Selim's presidency and the chairman of Al-Ahram advertising agency which is part of the Al-Ahram association and the president of the International Advertising Association (IAA)'s Cairo branch. He also played for Al Ahly football team as a midfielder/defender in 1960 and 1970, and was the 20th captain of the squad. He played for Egypt national football team from early seventies to late seventies of the last century.

== Director of Football ==
Hassan Hamdy took the post of Director of the Game momentarily caught up on June 17, 1979 and was preparing youngest holder of this office in Egypt, where Egyptian clubs had not completed general session, after which time many felt it to be one of the difficult tasks, which are the responsibility of the leadership of the largest and most powerful group in Egypt. Because Hamdy succeeded in taking command of Al Ahly for many championships where he won the football league seasons 7 times, and the Copa Egypt 4 times the years 1981, 83 and 84, 1985. He also achieved the Dome of the first African to win the Copa Clubs Champions league in 1982 and Champions Cup three times years 84, 85, 1986.

Hamdy took a decision to have a meeting between Al Ahly and Zamalek in the role of 8 Egypt Cup in 1985. Al Ahly defeated El Zamalek on August 4, 1985. Hamdy returned in the elections held on November 15, 1996 and was elected as an agent and won 6219 votes, the highest votes in the history of the club elections. In the November 2000 elections, Hamdy returned to assert his position inside the Ahli Club, where he was elected vice-president by a significant margin over his closest rivals.

== President of Al Ahly ==
After the death of Saleh Selim on May 6, 2002, Hassan Hamdi submitted a nomination for the presidency. The club members renewed their confidence in Hasan Hamdi in the elections of December 17, 2004. This was announced by the overwhelming support for Hamdi and the full list of the club's leadership of the new electoral witness celebrate National occasion of the centenary of the foundation.

== See also ==
- Al Ahly
- Hassan Hamdi's Profile (Arabic)
