= Doors open =

Doors open may refer to:

- Doors Open, a 2008 novel by Ian Rankin
- Doors Open (film), a 2012 Scottish adaptation of the novel, directed by Marc Evans
- Doors Open Days, which enable free access to buildings not normally open to the public
- The Doors Open, a 1949 novel by Michael Gilbert
