= Kwasi Owusu =

Ghanaian footballer (1945–2020)

Personal information
- Date of birth: 5 November 1945
- Date of death: 30 March 2020 (aged 74)
- Place of death: Sunyani, Ghana
- Position: Forward

Senior career*
Years	Team	Apps	(Gls)
1966–1976	Bofoakwa Tano		

International career
1967–1977	Ghana	52	(36)
- * Club domestic league appearances and goals

Kwasi Owusu (5 November 1945 – 30 March 2020) was a Ghanaian footballer who played as a forward for Bofoakwa Tano. He is the Ghana national team's third leading international goal scorer with 36 goals in 52 appearances. He died aged 74, on 30 March 2020, in Sunyani.

== Career statistics ==
=== International ===
Scores and results list Ghana's goal tally first, score column indicates score after each Owusu goal.

List of international goals scored by Kwasi Owusu
No.	Date	Venue	Opponent	Score	Result	Competition
1	17 August 1969		Niger		6–0	1970 Africa Cup of Nations qualifying game
2	17 August 1969		Niger		6–0	1970 Africa Cup of Nations qualifying game
3	17 August 1969		Niger		6–0	1970 Africa Cup of Nations qualifying game
4	17 August 1969		Niger		6–0	1970 Africa Cup of Nations qualifying game
5	17 August 1969		Niger		6–0	1970 Africa Cup of Nations qualifying game
6	21 September 1969		Niger		9–1	1970 Africa Cup of Nations qualifying game
7	21 September 1969		Niger		9–1	1970 Africa Cup of Nations qualifying game
8	21 September 1969		Niger		9–1	1970 Africa Cup of Nations qualifying game
9	21 September 1969		Niger		9–1	1970 Africa Cup of Nations qualifying game
10	7 February 1970		Congo-Kinshasa		2–0	1970 Africa Cup of Nations First Round
11	7 February 1970		Congo-Kinshasa		2–0	1970 Africa Cup of Nations First Round
12	11 February 1970		Guinea		1–1	1970 Africa Cup of Nations First Round
13	15 April 1970		Ivory Coast		3–0	Friendly
14	19 April 1970		Ivory Coast		1–1	Friendly
15	7 February 1971		Sierra Leone		2–1	Friendly
16	2 May 1971		Ivory Coast		6–2	Friendly
17	2 May 1971		Ivory Coast		6–2	Friendly
18	30 April 1972		Cameroon		3–0	1972 Summer Olympics
19	18 June 1972		Dahomey		5–0	1974 FIFA World Cup qualifying game
20	18 June 1972		Dahomey		5–0	1974 FIFA World Cup qualifying game
21	2 July 1972		Dahomey		5–1	1974 FIFA World Cup qualifying game
22	8 January 1973		Nigeria		2–4	1973 All-Africa Games First Round
23	10 January 1971		Tanzania		1–0	1973 All-Africa Games First Round
24	14 January 1973		Guinea		1–2	1973 All-Africa Games Semi-final
25	17 August 1974		Nigeria		1–0	Nigeria/Ghana Festival
26	14 December 1975		Guinea		6–2	1976 Summer Olympics qualifying game
27	14 December 1975		Guinea		6–2	1976 Summer Olympics qualifying game
28	14 December 1975		Guinea		6–2	1976 Summer Olympics qualifying game
29	6 April 1975		Liberia		6–0	1976 Summer Olympics qualifying game
30	6 April 1975		Liberia		6–0	1976 Summer Olympics qualifying game
31	13 April 1975		Mali		1–3	1976 Africa Cup of Nations qualifying game
32	20 April 1975		Liberia		4–1	1976 Summer Olympics qualifying game
33	20 April 1975		Liberia		4–1	1976 Summer Olympics qualifying game
34	27 April 1975		Mali		4–0	1976 Africa Cup of Nations qualifying game
35	24 August 1975		Nigeria		1–2	Nigeria/Ghana Festival
36	31 August 1975		Nigeria		3–0	Nigeria/Ghana Festival
