= Emmanuel Koum =

Cameroonian footballer (1946–2008)

Personal information
- Date of birth: 5 January 1946
- Place of birth: Douala, Cameroon
- Date of death: 26 November 2008 (aged 62)
- Height: 1.75 m (5 ft 9 in)
- Position: Striker

Senior career*
Years	Team	Apps	(Gls)
1963–1967	Oryx Douala		
1967–1970	Grenoble	91	(52)
1970–1973	Monaco	46	(24)
1973–1974	Arles	13	(6)
1974–1978	Chaumont	114	(42)
1978–1979	Moulins		

International career
- Cameroon
- * Club domestic league appearances and goals

Emmanuel Koum (5 January 1946 – 26 November 2008) was a Cameroonian professional footballer who played as a striker. He played for Oryx Douala, Grenoble, Monaco, Arles, Chaumont and Moulins.
