= Wad Madani Stadium =

Sports venue in Wad Madani, Sudan

- Interactive map of Wad Madani Stadium
- Full name: Wad Madani Stadium
- Location: Wad Madani, Sudan
- Coordinates: 14.39667°N 33.50948°E
- Capacity: 15,000

Tenant
- Al-Ittihad SC

Wad Madani Stadium is a multi-use stadium in Wad Madani, Sudan. It is currently used mostly for football matches; it is the home stadium of Ittihad Wad Medani, Al Ahly Wad Medani and Jazeerat Al-Feel football clubs. The stadium has a capacity of 15,000 people. It hosted several matches during the 1970 African Cup of Nations in Sudan.
