= Open Door Children's Home =

Children's home in Rome, United States

Coordinates: 34.26638°N 85.20971°W

The Open Door Children's Home is a children's home in Rome, Georgia, in the United States.

== History ==
The Open Door Children's Home opened in 1927. The Home began as temporary shelter for children whose fathers were in jail for selling alcohol during Prohibition. In 1929, the Home moved into a larger place and became a permanent placement for children to stay. In 1936, Floyd County, the city of Rome, and the Federal Government made what is now known as the Girls Home the permanent facility. The new facility could house up to thirty girls and younger boys. For more than sixty years the Open Door Children's Home housed girls and young boys only. In 2000, board members Louise Hunt and her husband Elwood saw that there was a need to place and care for teenage boys. With help of a development block grant, the Louise Hunt Home for Boys was built.

Today, both homes combined can house up to 54 children from birth to 18 years of age. Children living at the Open Door Home are usually victims of sexual, mental, and physical abuse, neglect, substandard living conditions, and death of their parents. While at the home, children receive medical, dental, and therapeutic care. The home also provides a clean, home-like environment, three meals a day plus snacks, and clothing. The home employees caring staff to help the kids with activities of daily living, homework, or even a hug when one is needed. The children think of the "houseparents" as surrogate parents and enjoy the attention that is given to them.

The Open Door Children's Home has been a foundation in Northwest Georgia for over 80 years, providing resources in independent and transitional living with the help of the community volunteers and the many donations that are received on a daily basis. The home will continue to care for children as long as there is a need.
