= Mohamed Salah Jedidi =

Tunisian footballer

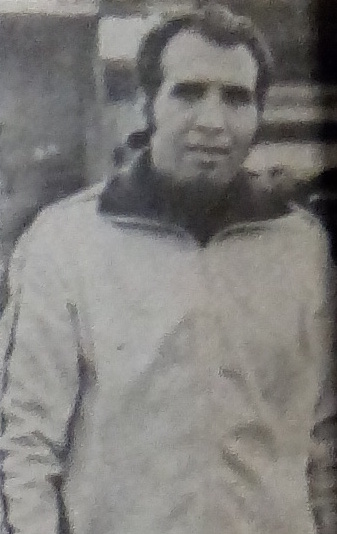

Personal information
- Date of birth: 17 March 1938
- Place of birth: Ghardimaou, Tunisia
- Date of death: 17 March 2014 (aged 76)
- Position: Striker

Senior career*
| Years | Team | Apps | (Gls) |
| 1958–1969 | Club Africain | | |
| 1969–1970 | AS Mégrine | | |

International career
| 1962–1968 | Tunisia | | |
- * Club domestic league appearances and goals

Mohamed Salah Jedidi (Arabic: مُحَمَّد صَالِح الْجَدِيدِيّ; 17 March 1938 – 17 March 2014) was a Tunisian footballer who played as a striker.

== Career ==
Born in Ghardimaou, Jedidi played club football in Tunisia for Club Africain and AS Mégrine.

He played for Tunisia between 1962 and 1968.
