= Albert Onyeawuna =

Nigerian footballer (died 2014)

Personal information
- Date of death: 21 April 2014 (aged 78)
- Place of death: Festac Town, Nigeria

Senior career*
Years	Team	Apps	(Gls)
- Port Harcourt

International career
1955–1964	Nigeria	26	(7)
- * Club domestic league appearances and goals

Albert Onyeawuna (died 21 April 2014) was a Nigerian footballer.

He played club football for Port Harcourt, and also made 26 appearances for the Nigerian national team between 1955 and 1964, scoring 7 goals.
