= Elkanah Onyeali =

Nigerian footballer

Personal information
- Full name: Elkanah Bollington Onyeali
- Date of birth: 7 June 1939
- Place of birth: Port Harcourt, Nigeria
- Date of death: 11 August 2008 (aged 69)
- Place of death: Umunjam, Imo State, Nigeria
- Position: Centre forward

Senior career*
Years	Team	Apps	(Gls)
1960–1961	Tranmere Rovers	13	(8)
1961	Holyhead Town		
1961–1962	Prescot Cables		

International career
1959–1961	Nigeria	11	(11)
- * Club domestic league appearances and goals

Elkanah Bollington Onyeali (7 June 1939 – 11 August 2008) was a Nigerian professional footballer who played as a centre forward for Tranmere Rovers, scoring 8 goals in 13 games in the Football League during the 1960–61 season. Onyeali was one of the first African players to play in England, and the first black player to play professionally on Merseyside.

He came to England in 1960, to study at Birkenhead Technical College, and was offered a contract by local club Tranmere Rovers. However, he was released after one season as the new manager did not want to accommodate a part-time player. Both before and after coming to England, he also played for the Nigeria national team, scoring 11 goals in as many games between 1959 and 1961. Between September 1961 and October 1962, Oneyali played for Prescot Cables whilst studying at Liverpool University and was the club's top scorer during the 1961–62 season. He returned to Nigeria at the end of his studies.

He later studied in the United States before returning to Nigeria, where he coached teams including the Trojans and the Spartans.

Onyeali died in August 2008, aged 69.
