= Mohamed Morsi Hussein =

Egyptian footballer (1939-1965)

Personal information
- Date of birth: 8 April 1939
- Place of birth: Cairo, Egypt
- Date of death: 28 September 1965 (aged 26)
- Place of death: Beheira Governorate, Egypt
- Position: Forward

Senior career*
Years	Team	Apps	(Gls)
1956–1963	Ismaily		
1963–1964	Al Ahly		
1964–1965	Ismaily		

International career
- Egypt
Medal record
Men's Football
Representing United Arab Republic
Africa Cup of Nations
Third place	1963 Ghana
- * Club domestic league appearances and goals

Mohamed Morsi Hussein (8 April 1939 – 28 September 1965), known as Reda, was an Egyptian footballer. He competed in the men's tournament at the 1960 Summer Olympics.

On 28 September 1965 Reda died after a car accident.

== Honours ==
United Arab Republic

- African Cup of Nations: 3rd place, 1963
