= Livingstone Madegwa =

Kenyan Footballer

Livingstone Madegwa is a retired Kenyan footballer who was capped 49 times for the Kenya between 1964 and 1972, scoring 26 goals.

He featured for club sides Kakamega Black Stars, Feisal, Abaluhya United, the present day AFC Leopards, and Kenya Breweries, the present day Tusker FC, where he predominant played as a left winger. He represented Kenya at the 1972 African Cup of Nations in Cameroon.
