= Ali Kitonsa =

Uganda footballer (1939–2013)

Personal information
- Full name: Ali Kitonsa
- Date of birth: 12 May 1939
- Place of birth: Butambala District, Uganda
- Date of death: 23 March 2013 (aged 73)
- Place of death: Uganda
- Position: Forward

Senior career*
Years	Team	Apps	(Gls)
1959-1964	Express	18	(54)
1964	Zamalek SC		
1965-1979	Express	18	(36)

International career
1961-1972	Uganda	16	(30)
- * Club domestic league appearances and goals

Ali Kitonsa (12 May 1939 – 23 March 2013) was a Ugandan footballer who played as a striker. He is known as the first professional Ugandan footballer and regarded as one of the greatest players in Ugandan football history.

== Club career ==
Ali Kitonsa was one of the first players to be signed by Express founder Joseph "Jolly Joe" Kiwanuka, who spotted Kitonsa when Kitonsa was playing for King's College Buddo Secondary School. Thanks to his goals, the Red Eagles achieved promotion to the top flight in 1961. Kitonsa unofficially holds the record for the highest number goals in the Uganda Premier League in one season: 54 goals in 18 games as Express won the 1964 Kampala First Division League. The following season, Kitonsa signed with Zamalek SC, becoming the first professional Ugandan footballer. He didn't stay for long, as he returned to Express FC, picking up two more league titles, in 1974 and 1975. It is estimated that Kitonsa scored over 200 goals before retiring in 1979 at the age of 40.

== Career statistics ==
=== International ===
Appearances and goals by national team and year
National team	Year	Apps	Goals
Uganda
Uganda	1961	1	-
Uganda	1962	-	-
Uganda	1963	2	8
Uganda	1964	5	11
Uganda	1965	7	10
Uganda	1966	-	-
Uganda	1967	-	-
Uganda	1968	-	-
Uganda	1969	-	-
Uganda	1970	-	-
Uganda	1971	-	-
Uganda	1972	1	1
Career total		16	30

== International career ==
Kitonsa represented Uganda from 1963 to 1965, scoring 30 times in just 16 games. However, he may have started his international career earlier than we so far know, due to records of games not being officially released. His stats could inflate due to further research being undertook, he played an estimated 30 games for Uganda, which may be proven in Ugandan newspapers of the time.
