= Saleh Selim =

Egyptian footballer (1930–2002)

- صالح سليم
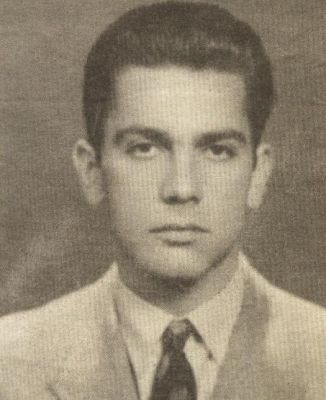

13th and 15th President of Al Ahly SC
- In office 13 December 1980 – 16 December 1988
- Preceded by: Abd El-Mohsen Mortagy
- Succeeded by: Saleh El Wahsh
- In office 7 February 1992 – 6 May 2002
- Preceded by: Saleh El Wahsh
- Succeeded by: Hassan Hamdy

Personal details
- Born: Mohamed Saleh Mohamed Selim; 11 September 1930 Cairo, Kingdom of Egypt
- Died: 6 May 2002 (aged 71) London, United Kingdom
- Resting place: Cairo, Egypt
Association football career
- Position: Midfielder
Youth career
- 1942–1948: Al Ahly
Senior career*
Years	Team	Apps	(Gls)
1948–1962	Al Ahly	354	(78)
1962–1963	Grazer AK		
1963–1967	Al Ahly		
International career
1950–1962	Egypt		
Medal record
Men's Football
Representing United Arab Republic
Africa Cup of Nations
Winner	1959 United Arab Republic
Runner-up	1962 Ethiopia
- * Club domestic league appearances and goals

Mohamed Saleh Mohamed Selim (Arabic: محمد صالح محمد سليم; 11 September 1930 – 6 May 2002) was an Egyptian football executive, former football player and an actor. He was the 13th president of Al Ahly SC.

Nicknamed "El Maestro", for taking Al Ahly's football team to numerous victories. He then became the manager of the team, then a member of the board of directors of the club. He finally became one of the most successful presidents of the club.

== Early life ==
Saleh was born on 11 September 1930 in Dokki, Giza, and his father is Dr. Mohamed Selim, a pioneer of Anesthesiology in Egypt. Selim's father met his mother, Zein El Sharaf, while she was undergoing surgery at his hospital. He married her and she gave birth to three males. Saleh was the eldest, followed by Abdel Wahab and Tareq. Saleh Selim had been a footballer since childhood. In Dokki, Giza. He joined the Orman Junior High School team, then the high school team during his studies at the Saadia school in the same district.

== Playing career ==
=== Club career ===
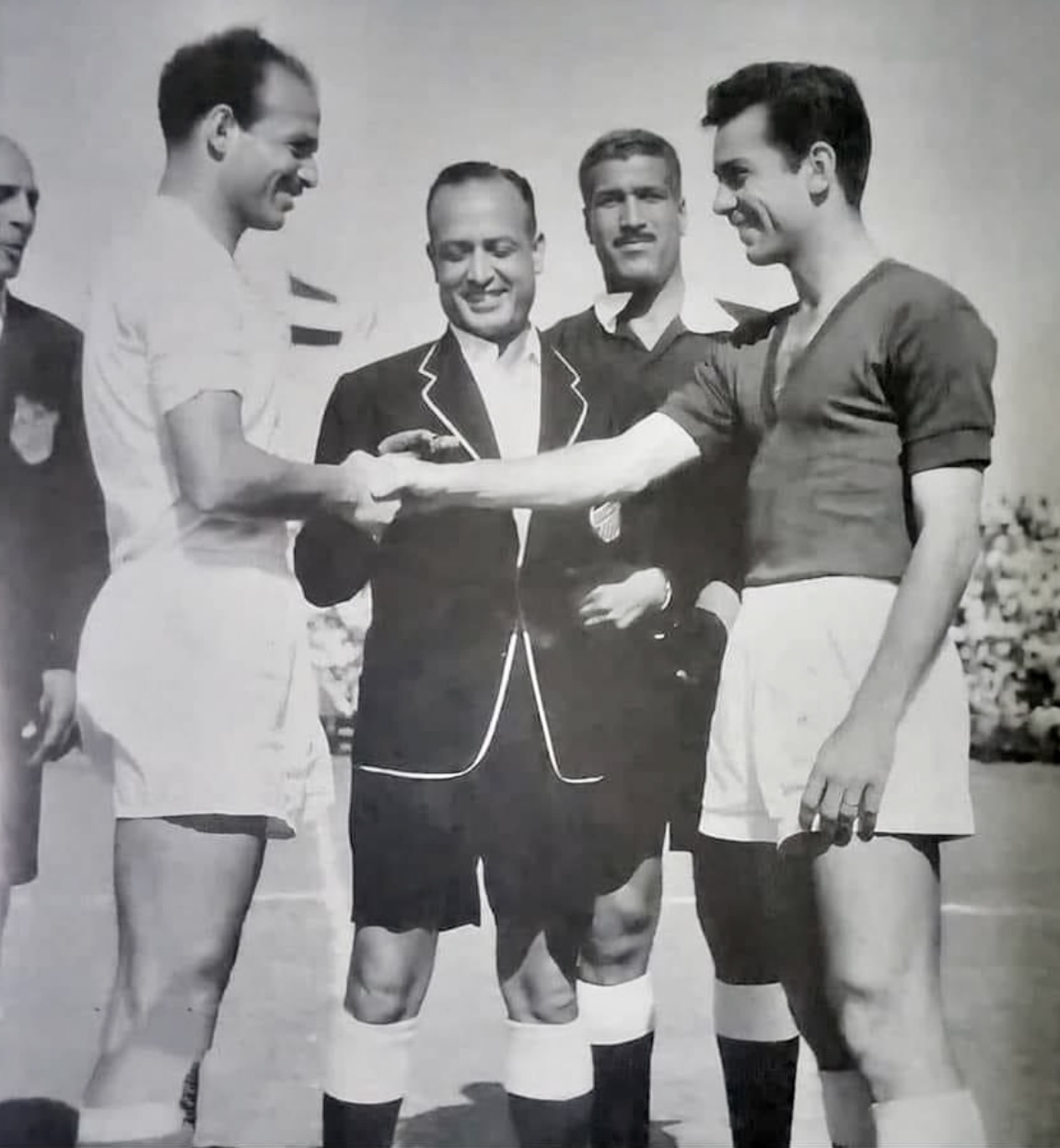
Selim shaking hands with Zamalek's captain Nour El-Dali and referee preparing to make a coin toss before the 1959 Egypt Cup final

Selim joined Al Ahly club in 1944 as a football player. He was discovered by Mr. Hassan Kamel, a supervisor of the club's team. He quickly succeeded in proving his presence and talent, and was promoted to the first team at the age of seventeen. He played his first game (friendly) in front of Al Masry in 1948, and Al Ahly won 2-1 with Saleh scoring the winning goal. His first official game was against Alexandria in the third week of the Egyptian league championship season of 1948 where Al Ahly achieved victory. Selim won 9 consecutive League titles with Al Ahly (1948–49 To 1958–59) (Egyptian all-time Record). He scored 92 Goals for Al Ahly, 78 in the Egyptian League and 14 in the Egypt Cup.

Saleh Selim was the first Egyptian soccer player in Austria and it was a "transfer-sensation" when he joined Grazer AK and scored 3 goals in 6 championship-games (10/6 with friendly-games included) for the oldest Styrian football club during the 1962–63 season. He retired from football in 1967.

=== International career ===
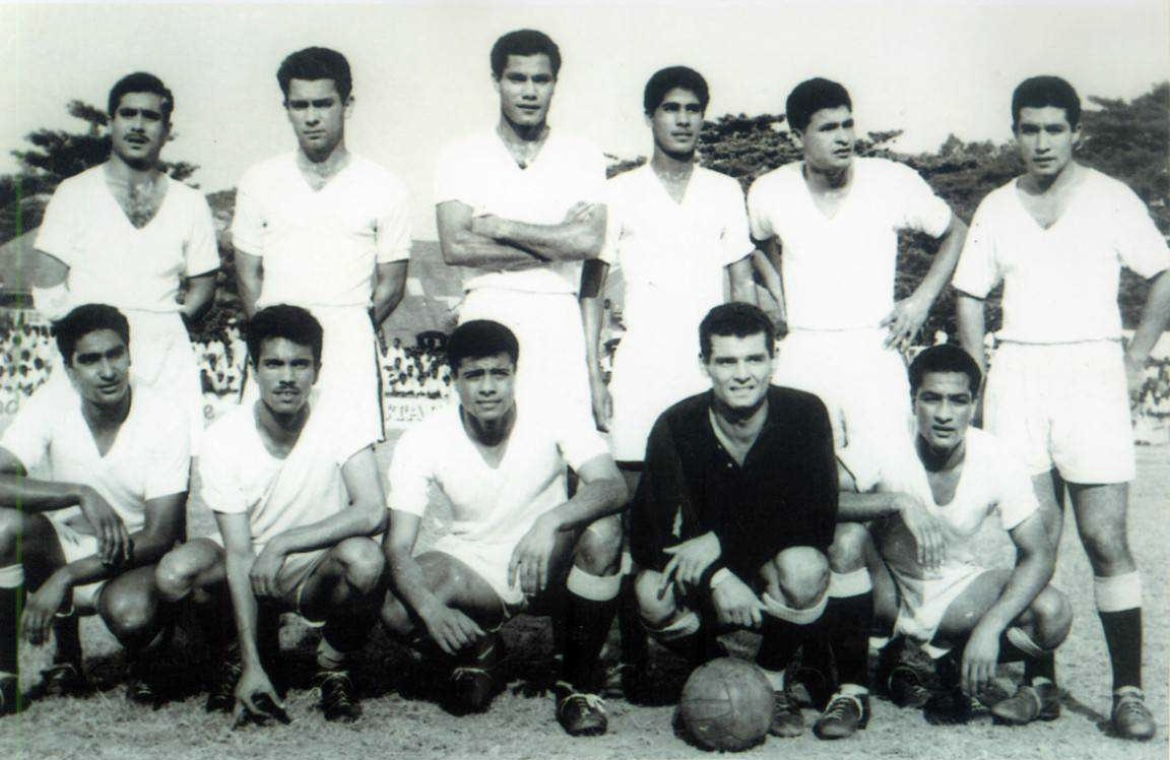
Selim (second standing from left) with Egypt in 1959

His first international appearance for the Egypt national team was in a match against Turkey in Eastern Mediterranean Cup on 1 February 1950, when Egypt won 3–0. He was a part of the team that participated in the 1960 Olympic Games in Rome. Selim was also a part of the team that participated in the 1959 African Cup of Nations, where Egypt won the tournament. He played for his country in the 1962 edition and where they finished second, he played 3 games in the Africa Cup of Nations and scored 1 Goal.

== Management career ==
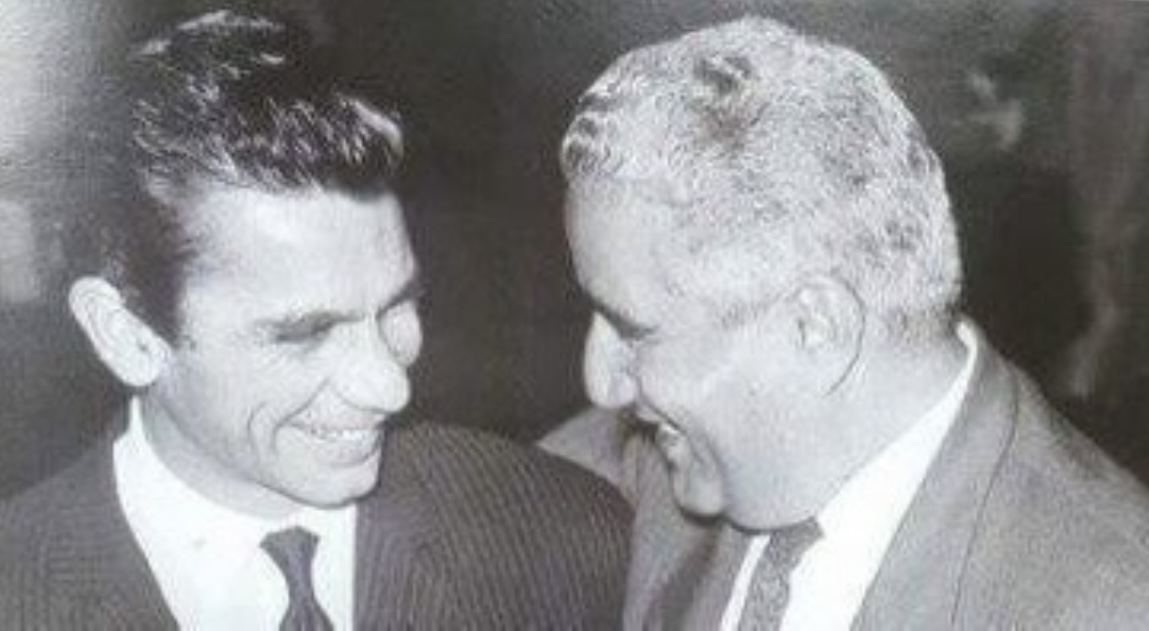
Selim (left) with Helmy Zamora at Selim's honoring in Zamalek headquarters, 1967

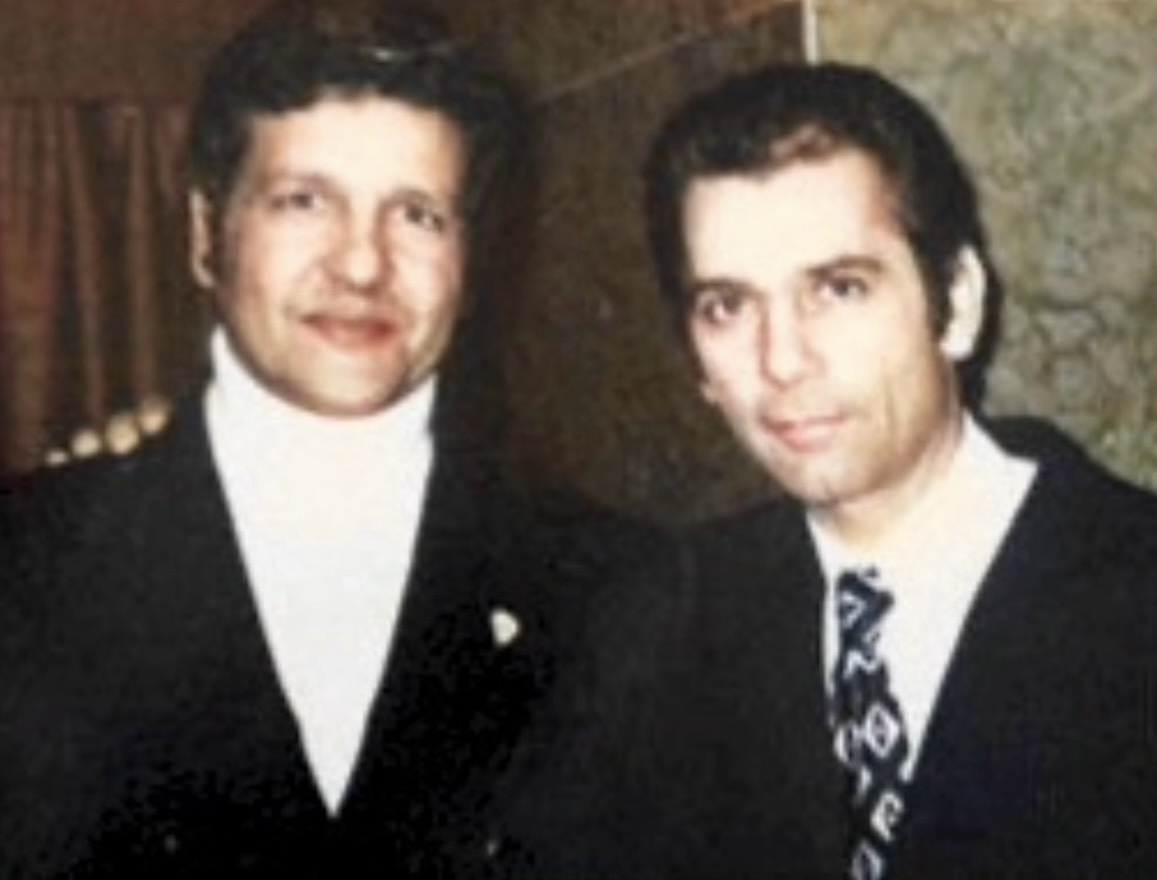
Selim (right) with Zaki Osman in 1973

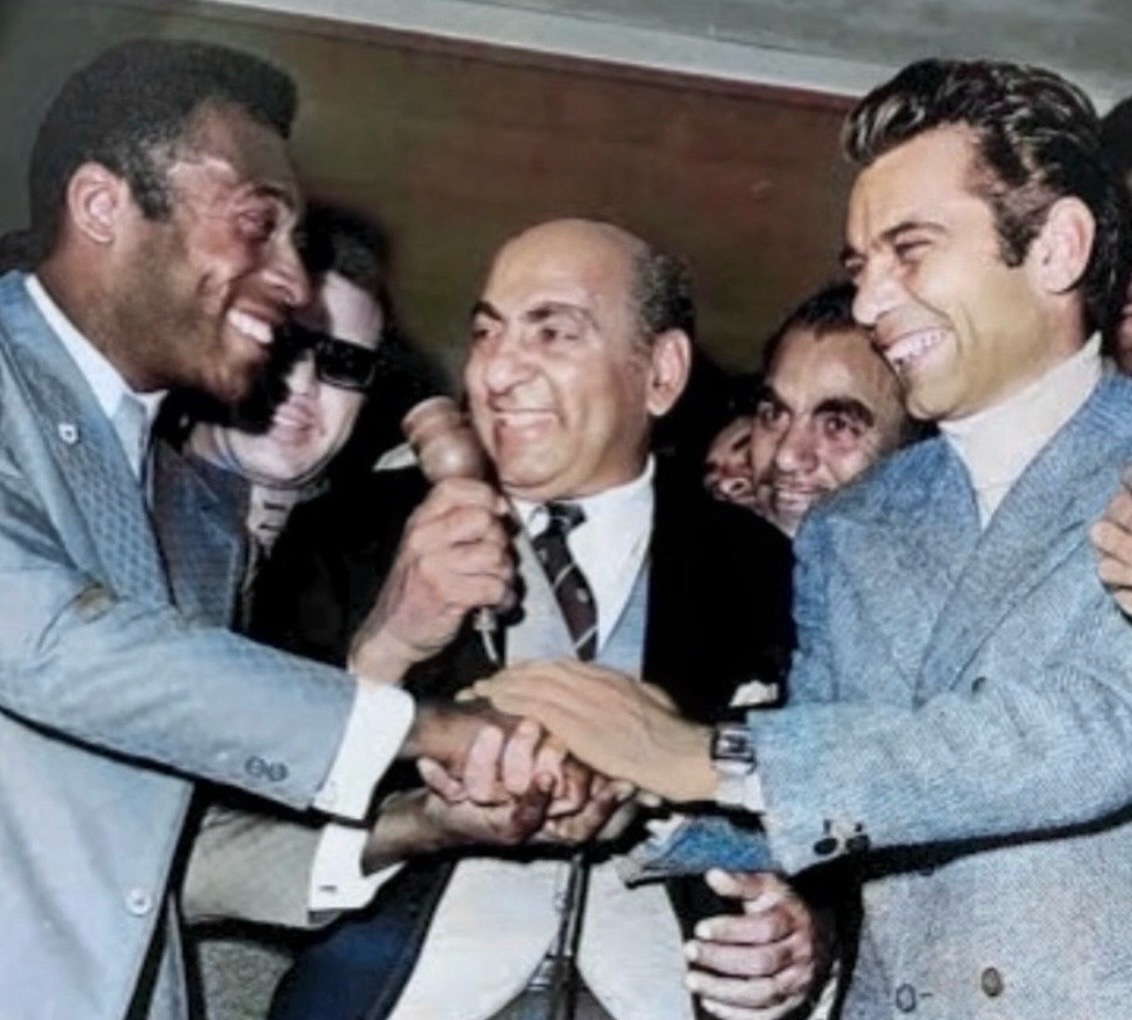
Selim (right) shaking hands with Pelé with Mohamed Latif in the middle, Cairo in 1973

After his retirement from football, Selim was appointed Al Ahly Football Director in 1971. He was elected Al Ahly Club Board Member 1972. In 1980, he was elected the president of Al Ahly. He was then re-elected five successive times, from 12 December 1980 till 16 December 1988 & from 6 February 1992 till 6 May 2002, he was elected five times; 1980, 1984, 1992, 1996 and 2000. During his presidency, Al-Ahly was elected the African club of the century. On 22 May 2001 Saleh received the award in Johannesburg. He died in 2002 of liver cancer.

== Film career ==
He co-starred in the 1962 film Black Candles directed by Ezz El-Dine Zulficar, with Nagat El-Sagheera in the leading role where she sang her widely known song "Do not lie". He also acted in the 1963 film The Open Door directed by Henry Barakat, starring Faten Hamama.

== Personal life ==
Selim was born in Cairo in 1930. His father Mohamed Selim was a renowned physician. He had two younger brothers, Abdelwahab and Tariq Selim. He was married and has two sons Khaled and Hisham Selim who was an actor.

== Honours ==
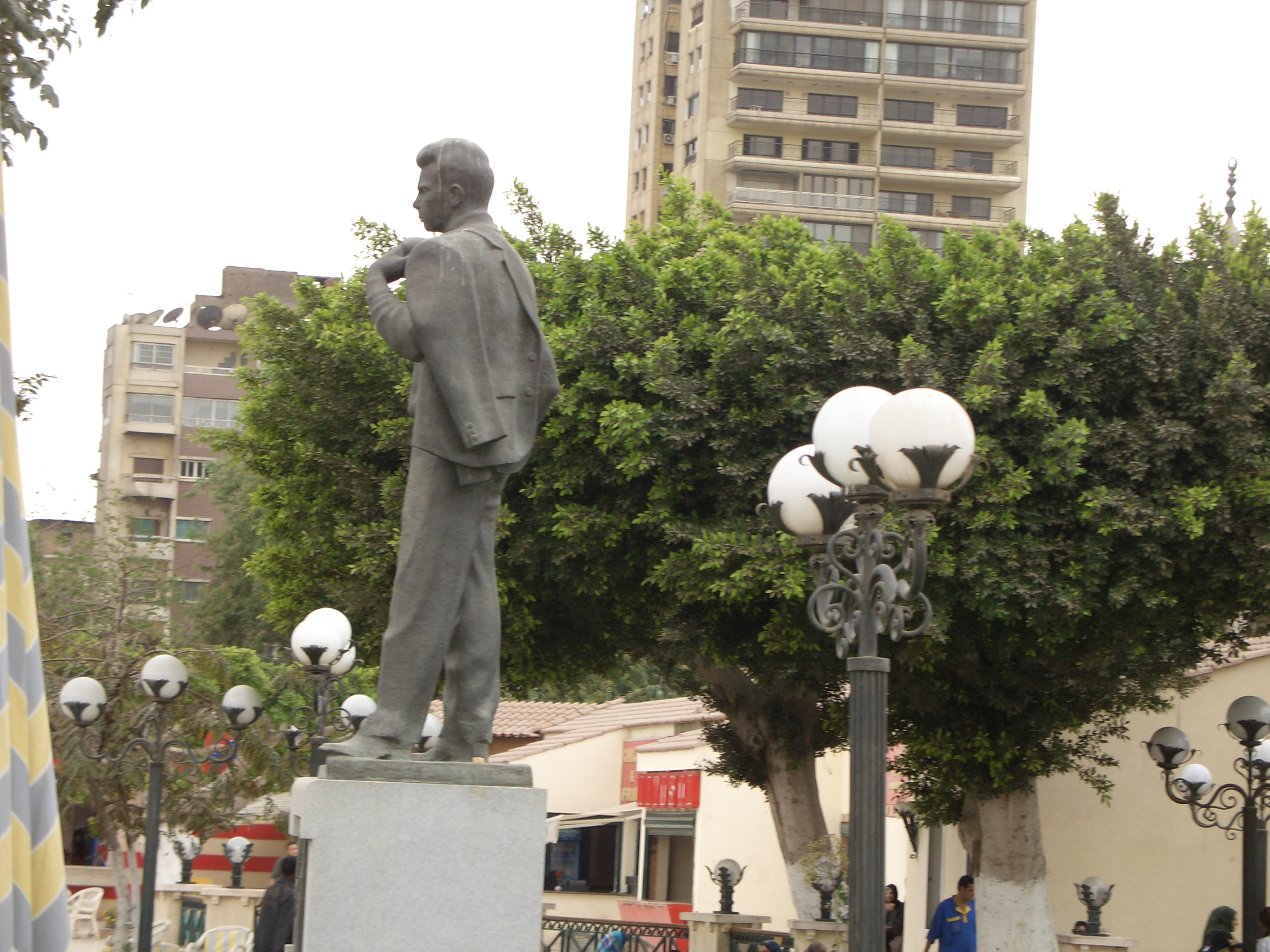
Statue of Saleh Selim in Al Ahly's headquarters

Al Ahly

- 11 Egyptian Premier League titles
- 8 Egypt Cup titles

United Arab Republic

- African Cup of Nations: 1959; runner-up, 1962
