= Mokhtar El Tetsh Stadium =

Sports venue in Cairo, Egypt

Coordinates: 30°02′43″N 31°13′24″E

Mokhtar El-Tetsh Stadium
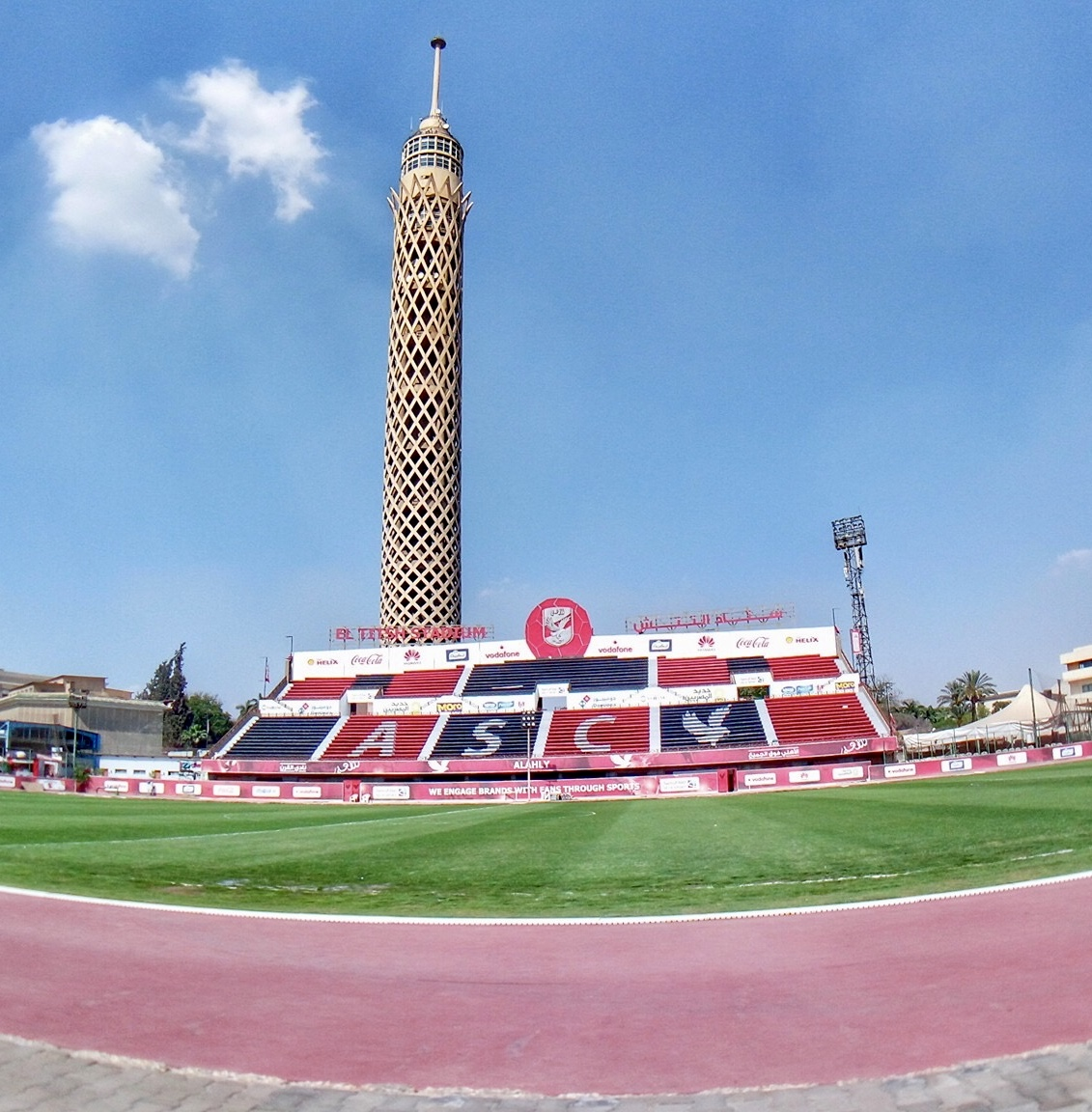
- Interactive map of Mokhtar El-Tetsh Stadium
- Full name: Mokhtar El-Tetsh Stadium (1965–présent)
- Former names: Al Ahly Stadium; Prince Farouk Stadium
- Address: 3 Saleh Selim Street, Gezira Zamalek, Cairo, Egypt, 11568
- Location: Cairo, Egypt
- Owner: Al Ahly
- Operator: Al Ahly
- Capacity: 15,000
- Surface: Grass
- Record attendance: 20,000

Construction
- Opened: 1917

Tenant
- Al Ahly SC (Training Field)

El-Tetsh Stadium (Arabic: ستاد مختار التتش) is the current training stadium of Al Ahly SC. The stadium was originally founded for students of higher schools to meet and practice political dialogue. Al Ahly would build its first stadium in 1909, called Al-Hawsh, a colloquial word from Egyptian Arabic meaning "the Courtyard". The stadium was developed over the years to be Mokhtar El-Tetsh Stadium. Currently the stadium hosts the team's training and friendly games.

== History ==
- In 1917, Al Ahly decided to build its own stadium.
- In 1927, at the request of Mokhtar El-Tetsh, Al Ahly SC added a western stand to the stadium.
- In 1929, the stadium was named after the then-Amir of Egypt, Prince Farouk Stadium.
- By 1956, floodlit stands had been added.
- In 1965, the stadium was renamed after the club legend Mahmoud Mokhtar Refai, known as "Mokhtar El Tetsh," following his death. It is currently used as Al Ahly SC training ground, as well as for some friendly matches.
- The stadium evolved over the years and became known as Mokhtar El-Tetsh Stadium. Later, it was named after the club legend and one of the most prominent footballers in Egyptian history, who enjoyed widespread popularity among his compatriots. Al Ahly SC continued to play its home matches at Mokhtar El-Tetsh Stadium until it moved to Cairo International Stadium.
- Mokhtar El-Tetsh Stadium is a multi-purpose stadium in Cairo, Egypt. It is currently used mostly for football matches, and was the main stadium of Al-Ahly Club before it moved to Cairo International Stadium due to its small capacity.

== Names of the stadium ==
- Since the opening of Al Ahly headquarters in 1909, the club has owned an area of land called Al-Hawsh in Egyptian dialect, meaning courtyard. Club members used to practice football here before the stadium was built.
- The first time Al Ahly built the stadium its name was Al Ahly Stadium.
- On 8 January 1929 after the monarchy sponsored Al Ahly during the reign of King Fuad, Al Ahly change the name of the stadium to Prince Farouk Stadium.
- On 21 February 1965 after the death of Mahmoud Mokhtar El-Tetsh, Al Ahly decided to rename the stadium under the name of Mokhtar El-Titsh Stadium and it still founded till now.
- Conclusion of the Names :

Dates	Name
→ 1909–1917	Al-Hawsh
→ 1917–1929	Al Ahly Stadium
→ 1929–1965	Prince Farouk Stadium
→ 1965–Current	Mokhtar El-Titsh Stadium

== 1959 Africa Cup of Nations ==
The stadium was the only venue for the 1959 Africa Cup of Nations.

The following matches were played at the stadium during the 1959 Africa Cup of Nations :

Date	Team #1	Result	Team #2	Round	Attendance
22 May 1959	United Arab Republic	4–0	Ethiopia	Group Phase	30,000
25 May 1959	Sudan	1–0	Ethiopia	Group Phase	20,000
29 May 1959	United Arab Republic	2–1	Sudan	Group Phase	30,000

== Mokhtar El-Titsh Stadium renewal stages ==
- in 2009 Al Ahly Chairman Hassan Hamdy decided to renew the western stand after demolishing it and relaunched again in its new shape in 2010.
- in 2016 Al Ahly Chairman Mahmoud Taher in collaboration with of Sela Sport Company, they renewal the western stand again and add the team color on the stand.
- in 2021 Al Ahly Chairman Mahmoud El Khatib renewed the Eastern stand and added the photos and names of the 72 ultras Ahlawy victims of the Port Said Stadium riot on it.

Preceded by Municipal Stadium; Khartoum, Sudan	Africa Cup of Nations; Final venue 1959	Succeeded by Hailé Sélassié Stadium; Addis Ababa, Ethiopia
