= Hasabu Al-Kabeer =

Sudanese footballer

Personal information
- Full name: Hasab Al-Rasoul Marhum Bakheit
- Date of birth: 1938
- Place of birth: Khartoum, Anglo-Egyptian Sudan
- Date of death: 24 June 2011 (aged 72–73)
- Place of death: Khartoum, Sudan

Senior career*
Years	Team	Apps	(Gls)
1956–1970	Burri SC		

International career
1959–	Sudan		
Medal record
Representing Sudan
Arab Games
Silver medal – second place	1965 Cairo
- * Club domestic league appearances and goals

Hasab Al-Rasoul Marhum Bakheit (Arabic: حسب الرسول مرحوم بخيت) known by his nickname Hasabu Al-Kabeer (Arabic: حسبو الكبير; 1938 – 24 June 2011) was a Sudanese international footballer who played with Burri SC.

== Honours ==
Burri SC

- Sudan Premier League: 1968–69

Sudan

- Arab Games: silver medalist: 1965
