= Khartoum Stadium =

Stadium in Khartoum, Sudan

Coordinates: 15°35′54″N 32°30′56″E

Khartoum Stadium استاد الخرطوم
- Interactive map of Khartoum Stadium استاد الخرطوم
- Full name: Khartoum International Stadium
- Former names: Municipal Stadium
- Location: Khartoum, Sudan
- Capacity: 23,000
- Surface: Grass

Construction
- Groundbreaking: 1948
- Built: 1956
- Opened: 28 September 1956 (70 years ago)
- Renovated: 2007, 2010

Tenants
- Al Ahli SC; Al Khartoum SC; Sudan national football team

The Khartoum International Stadium is a multi-purpose stadium in Khartoum, Sudan. It is used mostly for football matches. The stadium has a capacity of 23,000 people. It is also the home stadium of the Sudanese national football team. It was renovated for the 2011 African Nations Championship.

== History ==
The stadium was inaugurated on 28 September 1956 under the name of Municipal Stadium to host the first African football competition of nations, the 1957 African Cup of Nations. It also hosted the 1970 African Cup of Nations and the 2011 African Nations Championship. The stadium is used for both men's and women's football.

== Tournament results ==
=== 1957 Africa Cup of Nations ===
The stadium was the only venue for the 1957 Africa Cup of Nations.

The following matches were played at the stadium during the 1957 Africa Cup of Nations:

Date	Team #1	Result	Team #2	Round	Attendance
10 February 1957	Sudan	1–2	Egypt	Semifinals	30,000
10 February 1957	Ethiopia	2–0^{1}	South Africa	Semifinals	N/A
16 February 1957	Egypt	4–0	Ethiopia	Final	30,000

^{1} South Africa were disqualified due to the country's apartheid policies: CAF awarded Ethiopia a 2–0 victory.

=== 1970 Africa Cup of Nations ===
Date	Team #1	Result	Team #2	Round	Attendance
6 February 1970	Cameroon	3–2	Ivory Coast	Group A	14,464
6 February 1970	Sudan	3–0	Ethiopia	Group A	14,464
8 February 1970	Cameroon	3–2	Ethiopia	Group A	9,864
8 February 1970	Ivory Coast	1–0	Sudan	Group A	9,864
10 February 1970	Ivory Coast	6–1	Ethiopia	Group A	9,770
10 February 1970	Sudan	2–1	Cameroon	Group A	9,770
14 February 1970	Ivory Coast	1–2 (a.e.t.)	Ghana	Semifinals	12,350
14 February 1970	United Arab Republic	1–2 (a.e.t.)	Sudan	Semifinals	12,350
16 February 1970	United Arab Republic	3–1	Ivory Coast	Third place match	12,187
16 February 1970	Sudan	1–0	Ghana	Final	12,187

=== 2011 African Nations Championship ===
Date	Team #1	Result	Team #2	Round	Attendance
4 February 2011	Sudan	1–0	Gabon	Group A	N/A
5 February 2011	Uganda	0–2	Algeria	Group A	N/A
8 February 2011	Gabon	2–2	Algeria	Group A	N/A
8 February 2011	Sudan	1–0	Uganda	Group A	N/A
12 February 2011	Sudan	0–0	Algeria	Group A	N/A
14 February 2011	Cameroon	2–0	Ivory Coast	Group B	N/A
18 February 2011	South Africa	0–2	Algeria	Quarterfinals	N/A
19 February 2011	Tunisia	1–0	DR Congo	Quarterfinals	N/A
22 February 2011	Algeria	1–1 (3–5 pen.)	Tunisia	Semifinals	N/A

== Other Sudanese stadiums ==
The Khartoum Stadium is the third largest stadium in Sudan.

Stadium	City	Capacity	Home team
Al-Merrikh Stadium	Omdurman	43,000	Al-Merrikh SC
Al-Hilal Stadium	Omdurman	25,000	Al-Hilal
Khartoum Stadium	Khartoum	23,000	Khartoum NC
Port Sudan Stadium	Port Sudan	20,000	Hay Al-Arab SC, Hilal Alsahil SC
Wad Madani Stadium	Wad Madani	15,000	Al-Ittihad SC
Atbara Stadium	Atbara	15,000	Alamal SC Atbara
Stade Al-Merghani Kassala	Kassala	11,000	

Preceded by None	Africa Cup of Nations; Final venue 1957	Succeeded by Prince Farouk Stadium; Cairo, United Arab Republic
Preceded by Hailé Sélassié Stadium; Addis Ababa, Ethiopia	Africa Cup of Nations; Final venue 1970	Succeeded by Stade Omnisports; Yaoundé, Cameroon
