= Ethiopia at the Africa Cup of Nations =

Sporting event delegation

Ethiopia was formerly one of Africa's major forces, and played in every Africa Cup of Nations until the end of 1960s. Ethiopia themselves also won an AFCON tournament, the 1962 edition, when they were the hosts. Since then, success has started to fade from Ethiopia's football and after 1982, Ethiopia would have to wait until 2013, when the country qualified for the final tournament after a 31-year absence.

== Overall record ==
Africa Cup of Nations record
Appearances: 11
Year	Round	Position	Pld	W	D	L	GF	GA
(Sudan) 1957	Runners-up	2nd	1	0	0	1	0	4
(United Arab Republic) 1959	Third place	3rd	2	0	0	2	0	5
(Ethiopia) 1962	Champions	1st	2	2	0	0	8	4
(Ethiopia) 1963	First place	4th	3	1	0	2	4	7
(Tunisia) 1965	Group stage	5th	2	0	0	2	1	9
(Ethiopia) 1968	Fourth place	4th	5	3	0	2	8	6
(Sudan) 1970	Group stage	6th	3	0	0	3	3	12
(Cameroon) 1972	Did not qualify							
(Egypt) 1974	Did not qualify							
(Ethiopia) 1976	Group stage	5th	3	1	1	1	4	3
(Ghana) 1978	Did not qualify							
(Nigeria) 1980	Did not qualify							
(Libya) 1982	Group stage	8th	3	0	1	2	0	4
(Ivory Coast) 1984	Did not qualify							
(Egypt) 1986	Withdrew							
(Morocco) 1988	Withdrew during qualifying							
(Algeria) 1990	Did not qualify							
(Senegal) 1992	Withdrew during qualifying							
(Tunisia) 1994	Did not qualify							
(South Africa) 1996	Did not qualify							
(Burkina Faso) 1998	Did not qualify							
(Ghana) (Nigeria) 2000	Withdrew							
(Mali) 2002	Did not qualify							
(Tunisia) 2004	Did not qualify							
(Egypt) 2006	Did not qualify							
(Ghana) 2008	Did not qualify							
(Angola) 2010	Disqualified							
(Gabon) (Equatorial Guinea) 2012	Did not qualify							
(South Africa) 2013	Group stage	14th	3	0	1	2	1	7
(Equatorial Guinea) 2015	Did not qualify							
(Gabon) 2017	Did not qualify							
(Egypt) 2019	Did not qualify							
(Cameroon) 2021	Group stage	23rd	3	0	1	2	2	6
(Ivory Coast) 2023	Did not qualify							
(Morocco) 2025	Did not qualify							
(Kenya) (Tanzania) (Uganda) 2027	To be determined							
Total	1 Title	11/35	30	7	4	19	31	67

== Matches ==
=== Sudan 1957 ===
Semifinals

10 February 1957

Ethiopia	w/o	South Africa

Final

15 February 1957

Egypt	4–0	Ethiopia
El-Diba 2', 7', 68', 89'

Municipal Stadium, Khartoum
Attendance: 30,000
Referee: Mohammed Youssef (Sudan)

=== United Arab Republic 1959 ===
Team	Pld	W	D	L	GF	GA	GD	Pts	Result
United Arab Republic	2	2	0	0	6	1	+5	4	Champion
Sudan	2	1	0	1	2	2	0	2	
Ethiopia	2	0	0	2	0	5	−5	0	

22 May 1959

United Arab Republic	4–0	Ethiopia
El-Gohary 29', 42', 73'; El-Sherbini 64'

Prince Farouk Stadium, Cairo
Attendance: 30,000
Referee: Zivko Bajic (Yugoslavia)
25 May 1959

Sudan	1–0	Ethiopia
Drissa 40'

Prince Farouk Stadium, Cairo
Attendance: 20,000
Referee: M. Tsissis (Greece)

=== Ethiopia 1962 ===
Semi-finals
14 January – Addis Ababa
Ethiopia	4
Tunisia	2
18 January – Addis Ababa
United Arab Rep.	2
Uganda	1

Final
21 January – Addis Ababa
Ethiopia (aet)	4
United Arab Rep.	2
Third place
20 January – Addis Ababa
Tunisia	3
Uganda	0

Semifinals

14 January 1962

Ethiopia	4–2	Tunisia
Vassalo 32' (pen.), 75'; Tekle 36'; Worku 69'		Merrichkou 13'; Chérif 29'

Hailé Sélassié Stadium, Addis Ababa
Attendance: 30,000

Final

21 January 1962

Ethiopia	4–2 (a.e.t.)	United Arab Republic
Tekle 74'; L. Vassalo 84'; Worku 118'; Vassalo 101'		Badawi 35', 75'

Hailé Sélassié Stadium, Addis Ababa
Attendance: 30,000
Referee: Wilson Brooks (Uganda)

=== Ghana 1963 ===
Group stage

Team	Pld	W	D	L	GF	GA	GD	Pts
Ghana	2	1	1	0	3	1	+2	3
Ethiopia	2	1	0	1	4	4	0	2
Tunisia	2	0	1	1	3	5	−2	1

26 November 1963

Ghana	2–0	Ethiopia
Acquah

Accra Sports Stadium, Accra
28 November 1963

Ethiopia	4–2	Tunisia
Worku; Tekle; Tesfaye		Chetali; Jedidi

Accra Sports Stadium, Accra

Third place

30 November 1963

United Arab Republic	3–0	Ethiopia
Riza; Ismail; El-Shazly

Accra Sports Stadium, Accra

=== Tunisia 1965 ===
Group stage

Team	Pld	W	D	L	GF	GA	GD	Pts
Tunisia	2	1	1	0	4	0	+4	3
Senegal	2	1	1	0	5	1	+4	3
Ethiopia	2	0	0	2	1	9	−8	0

12 November 1965

Tunisia	4–0	Ethiopia
Chaïbi 32'; Jedidi 62'; Delhoum 80'; Lahmar 84'

Stade Chedli Zouiten, Tunis
19 November 1965

Senegal	5–1	Ethiopia
Camara 3', 52'; Guèye 37'; Niang 48', 53'		Vassalo 12' (pen.)

Stade Chedli Zouiten, Tunis

=== Ethiopia 1968 ===
Group stage

Team	Pld	W	D	L	GF	GA	GD	Pts
Ethiopia	3	3	0	0	6	2	+4	6
Ivory Coast	3	2	0	1	5	2	+3	4
Algeria	3	1	0	2	5	6	−1	2
Uganda	3	0	0	3	2	8	−6	0

12 January 1968

Ethiopia	2–1	Uganda
Tekle; Vassalo pen.'		Ouma

Hailé Sélassié Stadium, Addis Ababa
Attendance: 20,000
Referee: Kandil (Egypt)
14 January 1968

Ethiopia	1–0	Ivory Coast
Bekuretsion 86'

Hailé Sélassié Stadium, Addis Ababa
Attendance: 25,000
Referee: Saleh (Sudan)
16 January 1968

Ethiopia	3–1	Algeria
Worku 16'; Shewangizaw 19'; Vassalo 27' (pen.)		Amirouche 68'

Hailé Sélassié Stadium, Addis Ababa
Attendance: 20,000
Referee: Angaud (Congo-Brazzaville)

Semi-finals

19 January 1968

Ethiopia	2–3 (a.e.t.)	Congo-Kinshasa
Vassalo 25'; Worku 65'		Mantantu 3'; Mungamuni 16', 100'

Hailé Sélassié Stadium, Addis Ababa
Attendance: 25,000
Referee: Kandil (Egypt)

Third place

21 January 1968

Ivory Coast	1–0	Ethiopia
Pokou 28'

Hailé Sélassié Stadium, Addis Ababa
Attendance: 10,000
Referee: Khelifi (Algeria)

=== Sudan 1970 ===
Group stage

Team	Pld	W	D	L	GF	GA	GD	Pts
Ivory Coast	3	2	0	1	9	4	+5	4
Sudan	3	2	0	1	5	2	+3	4
Cameroon	3	2	0	1	7	6	+1	4
Ethiopia	3	0	0	3	3	12	−9	0

6 February 1970

Sudan	3–0	Ethiopia
Gagarin 43'; Hasab El-Rasoul Omer Ali 47'; Jaxa 85'

Municipal Stadium, Khartoum
Attendance: 14,464
Referee: Faber (Guinea)
8 February 1970

Cameroon	3–2	Ethiopia
Tsébo 21'; Manga-Onguéné 43'; N'Doga 70'		Mengistu 12', 75'

Municipal Stadium, Khartoum
Attendance: 9,864
Referee: Quarshie (Ghana)
10 February 1970

Ivory Coast	6–1	Ethiopia
Losseni 16'; Pokou 21', 60', 71', 80', 87'		Mengistu 33'

Municipal Stadium, Khartoum
Attendance: 9,770
Referee: Boukili (Morocco)

=== Ethiopia 1976 ===
Group stage

Team	Pld	W	D	L	GF	GA	GD	Pts
Guinea	3	2	1	0	5	3	+2	5
Egypt	3	1	2	0	4	3	+1	4
Ethiopia	3	1	1	1	4	3	+1	3
Uganda	3	0	0	3	2	6	−4	0

29 February 1976

Ethiopia	2–0	Uganda
Sheferaw 2'; Testaye 83'

Addis Ababa Stadium, Addis Ababa
Referee: Abdelkader Aouissi (Algeria)
3 March 1976

Ethiopia	1–2	Guinea
Sheferaw 40'		N'Jo Léa 15'; Petit Sory 85'

Addis Ababa Stadium, Addis Ababa
Referee: Saad Gamar (Libya)
5 March 1976

Ethiopia	1–1	Egypt
Ali 46'		Shehata 26'

Addis Ababa Stadium, Addis Ababa
Referee: Abdelkader Aouissi (Algeria)

=== Libya 1982 ===
Group stage

Team	Pld	W	D	L	GF	GA	GD	Pts
Algeria	3	2	1	0	3	1	+2	5
Zambia	3	2	0	1	4	1	+3	4
Nigeria	3	1	0	2	4	5	−1	2
Ethiopia	3	0	1	2	0	4	−4	1

7 March 1982

Nigeria	3–0	Ethiopia
Keshi 27', 84'; Adeshina 40'	Report

28 March Stadium, Benghazi
Attendance: 5,000
Referee: Bester Kalombo (Malawi)
10 March 1982

Zambia	1–0	Ethiopia
Munshya 68'	Report

28 March Stadium, Benghazi
Attendance: 5,000
Referee: Bashir Mahamed Jama
13 March 1982

Algeria	0–0	Ethiopia
	Report

28 March Stadium, Benghazi
Attendance: 5,000
Referee: Hugues Opangault

=== South Africa 2013 ===
Group stage

Team	Pld	W	D	L	GF	GA	GD	Pts
Burkina Faso	3	1	2	0	5	1	+4	5
Nigeria	3	1	2	0	4	2	+2	5
Zambia	3	0	3	0	2	2	0	3
Ethiopia	3	0	1	2	1	7	−6	1

21 January 2013
17:00
Round 1

Zambia	1–1	Ethiopia
Mbesuma 45+3'	Report	Adane 65'

Mbombela Stadium, Nelspruit
Attendance: 10,000
Referee: Eric Otogo-Castane (Gabon)
25 January 2013
20:00

Burkina Faso	4–0	Ethiopia
Al. Traoré 34', 74'; D. Koné 79'; Pitroipa 90+5'	Report

Mbombela Stadium, Nelspruit
Attendance: 35,000
Referee: Bernard Camille (Seychelles)
29 January 2013
19:00

Ethiopia	0–2	Nigeria
	Report	Moses 80' (pen.), 90' (pen.)

Royal Bafokeng Stadium, Rustenburg
Attendance: 15,000
Referee: Bouchaïb El Ahrach (Morocco)

=== Cameroon 2021 ===
Group stage

Pos	Team	Pld	W	D	L	GF	GA	GD	Pts	Qualification
1	Cameroon (H)	3	2	1	0	7	3	+4	7	Advance to knockout stage
2	Burkina Faso	3	1	1	1	3	3	0	4 (Note: Head-to-head result: Cape Verde 0–1 Burkina Faso.)	Advance to knockout stage
3	Cape Verde	3	1	1	1	2	2	0	4	Advance to knockout stage
4	Ethiopia	3	0	1	2	2	6	−4	1	

Source: CAF
Rules for classification: Group stage tiebreakers
(H) Hosts
Notes:
9 January 2022
20:00

Ethiopia	0–1	Cape Verde
	Report	J. Tavares 45+1'

Olembe Stadium, Yaoundé
Referee: Hélder Martins de Carvalho (Angola)

13 January 2022
17:00

Cameroon	4–1	Ethiopia
Toko Ekambi 8', 68'; Aboubakar 53', 55'	Report	Hotessa 4'

Olembe Stadium, Yaoundé
Referee: Jean Jacques Ndala Ngambo (DR Congo)

17 January 2022
17:00

Burkina Faso	1–1	Ethiopia
Bayala 25'	Report	Kebede 52' (pen.)

Kouekong Stadium, Bafoussam
Referee: Ahmad Heeralall (Mauritius)
