= 1962 African Cup of Nations squads =

Below is a list of squads used in the 1962 African Cup of Nations.

== United Arab Republic ==
Coach: (United Arab Republic) Mohamed El-Guindi & Hanafy Bastan

No.	Pos.	Player	Date of birth (age)	Caps	Goals	Club
	GK	Adel Hekal	23 March 1934 (aged 27)			(Egyptian Football Association) Al-Ahly
	GK	Abdel-Gelil Hemaida	28 December 1923 (aged 38)			(Egyptian Football Association) Tanta
	DF	Mimi El-Sherbini	26 July 1937 (aged 24)			(Egyptian Football Association) Al-Ahly
	DF	Amin El-Esnawi	23 June 1936 (aged 25)			(Egyptian Football Association) Al-Ittihad Suez
	DF	Ahmed Mostafa	12 September 1934 (aged 27)			(Egyptian Football Association) Zamalek
	DF	Tarek Selim	15 July 1937 (aged 24)			(Egyptian Football Association) Al-Ahly
	MF	Rifaat El-Fanagily	1 May 1936 (aged 25)			(Egyptian Football Association) Al-Ahly
	MF	Mohammed "Shehta" Seddiq	14 April 1940 (aged 21)			(Egyptian Football Association) Ismaily
	MF	Raafat Attia	6 February 1934 (aged 27)			(Egyptian Football Association) Zamalek
	MF	Saleh Selim	11 September 1930 (aged 31)			(Egyptian Football Association) Al-Ahly
	MF	Mohamed Badawai	24 May 1935 (aged 26)			(Egyptian Football Association) Al-Masry
	MF	Samir Qotb	16 March 1938 (aged 23)			(Egyptian Football Association) Zamalek
	FW	Badawi Abdel Fattah	24 May 1935 (aged 26)			(Egyptian Football Association) Tersana
	FW	Moustafa Reyadh	5 April 1941 (aged 20)			(Egyptian Football Association) Tersana
	FW	Taha Ismail	8 February 1939 (aged 22)			(Egyptian Football Association) Al-Ahly
	FW	Ahmed Effat				(Egyptian Football Association) Zamalek

== Ethiopia ==
Coach: (Ethiopia) Yidnekatchew Tessema

No.	Pos.	Player	Date of birth (age)	Caps	Goals	Club
	GK	Gila-Michael Tekle Mariam	1936			(Ethiopian Football Federation) Adulis Club
	GK	Berhane Bayene				(Ethiopian Football Federation) Omedla FC
	DF	Asmelash Berhe				(Ethiopian Football Federation) Ethio-Cement FC
	DF	Berhe Goitom				(Ethiopian Football Federation) Tele SC
	DF	Awad Mohammed				(Ethiopian Football Federation) Omedla FC
	MF	Girma Zeleke				(Ethiopian Football Federation) Cotton Factory Club
	MF	Mengistu Worku	1940			(Ethiopian Football Federation) Saint George
	MF	Kiflom Araya				(Ethiopian Football Federation) Tele SC
	MF	Luciano Vassallo (captain)	15 August 1935 (aged 26)			(Ethiopian Football Federation) Cotton Factory Club
	MF	Tesfaye Gebremedhin				(Ethiopian Football Federation) Tele SC
	FW	Getachew Wolde				(Ethiopian Football Federation) Cotton Factory Club
	FW	Italo Vassallo				(Ethiopian Football Federation) Cotton Factory Club
	FW	Tsegaye Tesfaye				(Ethiopian Football Federation) Ethio-Cement FC
	FW	Tekle Kidane	30 August 1939 (aged 22)			(Ethiopian Football Federation) Tele SC
	FW	Netsere Wolde Selassie				(Ethiopian Football Federation) Saint George
	FW	Haile Tesfagabre				(Ethiopian Football Federation) Tele SC
	FW	Negassie Gebre Michael				(Ethiopian Football Federation)

== Tunisia ==
Coach: (Socialist Federal Republic of Yugoslavia) Frane Matošić

No.	Pos.	Player	Date of birth (age)	Caps	Goals	Club
22	GK	Moncef Kechiche				(Tunisian Football Federation) AS Marsa
1	GK	Khaled Gharbi				(Tunisian Football Federation) Espérance Tunis
2	DF	Mohsen Keffala				(Tunisian Football Federation) Stade Tunisien
7	DF	Azaïez Jaballah				(Tunisian Football Federation) SA Menzel Bourguiba
9	DF	Abdelmajid Chetali	4 July 1939 (aged 22)			(Tunisian Football Federation) ES Sahel
3	DF	Ridha Rouatbi	7 February 1938 (aged 23)			(Tunisian Football Federation) ES Sahel
4	DF	Ahmed Sghaïer	2 January 1937 (aged 25)			(Tunisian Football Federation) US Tunisienne
5	MF	Khemais Chekir				(Tunisian Football Federation) US Monastir
6	DF	Nourredine Aloui				(Tunisian Football Federation) Espérance Tunis
13	MF	Ali Klibi	3 September 1942 (aged 19)			(Tunisian Football Federation) Espérance Tunis
17	MF	Chedly Laaouini	16 November 1916 (aged 45)			(Tunisian Football Federation) Espérance Tunis
11	MF	Fethi Chérif				(Tunisian Football Federation) CS Hammam-Lif
16	MF	Haj Ali	10 October 1937 (aged 24)			(Tunisian Football Federation) Espérance Tunis
14	MF	Rachid Meddeb	22 October 1940 (aged 21)			(Tunisian Football Federation) Espérance Tunis
21	MF	Tahar Mâammer				(Tunisian Football Federation) CS Hammam-Lif
8	MF	Taoufik Ben Othman	24 March 1939 (aged 22)			(Tunisian Football Federation) AS Marsa
20	FW	Driss Haddad	29 August 1941 (aged 20)			(Tunisian Football Federation) CA Bizertin
15	FW	Moncef Chérif	8 November 1940 (aged 21)			(Tunisian Football Federation) Stade Tunisien
12	FW	Mohamed Salah Jedidi	7 March 1938 (aged 23)			(Tunisian Football Federation) Club Africain
10	FW	Ammar Merrichkou	June 20, 1942 (aged 19)			(Tunisian Football Federation) AS Marsa

== Uganda ==
Coach: (Uganda) Polycarp Kakooza & Samson Yiga

No.	Pos.	Player	Date of birth (age)	Caps	Goals	Club
	GK	John Agard (captain)				(Federation of Uganda Football Associations) Bitumastic FC
	GK	John Ngabeki				(Federation of Uganda Football Associations) Police FC
	DF	David Ssimbwa	21 March 1934 (aged 27)			(Federation of Uganda Football Associations) Express FC
	DF	George Kakaire				(Federation of Uganda Football Associations)
	DF	David Otti	1940			(Federation of Uganda Football Associations) Bitumastic FC
	DF	Rustico Kasozi				(Federation of Uganda Football Associations) Mulago
	DF	Hassan Fauza				(Federation of Uganda Football Associations) KDS Club
	DF	Ibrahim Dafala	2 February 1935 (aged 26)			(Federation of Uganda Football Associations) Express FC
	MF	John Bunyenyezi				(Federation of Uganda Football Associations) Ntare Club
	MF	Clive Bond				(Federation of Uganda Football Associations) Uganda FA
	MF	Sam Bukenya				(Federation of Uganda Football Associations) UEB FC
	MF	Jimmy Semugabi				(Federation of Uganda Football Associations) UEB FC
	FW	Edward Semambo				(Federation of Uganda Football Associations) Mutungo FC
	FW	Odong Kongo				(Federation of Uganda Football Associations) Acholi FA
	FW	Joseph Mabirizi				(Federation of Uganda Football Associations) Mutungo FC
	FW	Francis "Jogoo" Atema				(Federation of Uganda Football Associations) KDS Club
	FW	Baker Kasigwa				(Federation of Uganda Football Associations) Bitumastic FC
	MF	Ben Omoding				(Federation of Uganda Football Associations)
		Aloo				(Federation of Uganda Football Associations)
