= 1962 African Cup of Nations final =

Football match held in Ethiopia

- Event: 1962 African Cup of Nations
Ethiopia	United Arab Republic
(Ethiopia)	(United Arab Republic)
4	2
- After extra time
- Date: 21 January 1962
- Venue: Hailé Sélassié Stadium, Addis Ababa
- Referee: Wilson Brooks (Uganda)
- Attendance: 30,000

The 1962 African Cup of Nations final was a football match that took place on 21 January 1962 at the Hailé Sélassié Stadium in Addis Ababa, Ethiopia, to determine the winner of the 1962 African Cup of Nations, the football championship of Africa organized by the Confederation of African Football (CAF).

Hosts Ethiopia beat United Arab Republic 4−2 after extra time, winning their first title.

== Road to the final ==
Ethiopia		Round	United Arab Rep.
Opponent	Result	Knockout stage	Opponent	Result
Tunisia	4–2	Semi-finals	Uganda	2–1

== Match ==
=== Details ===
21 January 1962

Ethiopia	4–2 (a.e.t.)	United Arab Republic
Kidane 74'; L. Vassallo 84' (Note: Mengistu Worku was initially credited with scoring twice in the final, but later, one of his goals in the 84th minute was attributed to Luciano Vassallo.); I. Vassallo 101'; Worku 118'		Badawi 35', 75'

Hailé Sélassié Stadium, Addis Ababa
Attendance: 30,000
Referee: Wilson Brooks (Uganda)

Ethiopia	United Arab Republic

GK	Gila-Michael Tekle Mariam
RB	Asmelash Berhe
CB	Awade Mohammed
CB	Kiflom Araya
LB	Berhe Goitom
RM	Tesfaye Gebremedhin
CM	Girma Zeleke	(substituted off) ?'
CM	Italo Vassallo
LM	Luciano Vassallo
CF	Mengistu Worku
CF	Getachew Wolde
Substitutions:
CF	Tekle Kidane	(substituted on) ?'
Manager:
Yidnekatchew Tessema (Socialist Federal Republic of Yugoslavia) Slavko Milošević

GK	Adel Hekal
RB	Ahmed Moustafa
CB	Raafat Ateya
CB	Tarek Selim
LB	Rifaat El-Fanagily
RM	Mohammed Badawi
CM	Mohamed Seddik
CM	Badawi Abdel Fattah
LM	Saleh Selim
CF	Taha Ismail
CF	Mimi El-Sherbini
Manager:
Mohamed El-Guindy; Hanafy Bastan
