= Giovanni De Min =

Giovanni De Min may refer to:

- Giovanni De Min (painter) (1786–1859), Italian painter and engraver
- Giovanni De Min (footballer) (born 1940), retired Italian footballer
