= Gila-Michael Tekle Mariam =

Ethiopian and Eritrean footballer (1936–2026)

Personal information
- Date of birth: 1936
- Place of birth: Italian Eritrea or Italian East Africa
- Date of death: June 2026 (aged 89–90)
- Place of death: San Diego, California, United States
- Position: Goalkeeper

Senior career*
Years	Team	Apps	(Gls)
- Adulis Club

International career
1956–1964	Ethiopia	12+	(0)
- * Club domestic league appearances and goals

Gila-Michael Tekle Mariam (Tigrinya: ጊላሚካኤል ተስፋማርያም; 1936 – June 2026), also known as Mikael Gila, was an Ethiopian footballer who played as a goalkeeper.

== Career ==
Tekle Mariam represented the Ethiopia national team at four African Cup of Nations between 1957 and 1963, winning it in 1962 after beating the United Arab Repiblic 4–2 in the final, and finishing as runners-up in 1957 after losing the final 4–0 to Egypt. Additionally, he played twice against Israel during 1962 FIFA World Cup qualification. His last known appearance for Ethiopia was on 13 May 1964, in a 3–1 friendly defeat to Greece in Athens.

In October 2021, he was included in the IFFHS's all-time dream teams for both Ethiopia and Eritrea.

== Personal life and death ==
Despite representing Ethiopia internationally, Tekle Mariam was from Eritrea, which would not become an independent country until 1993. He died in San Diego, California in June 2026.
