= Mengistu Worku =

Ethiopian footballer and manager

Personal information
- Date of birth: 1940
- Date of death: 16 December 2010 (aged 69–70)
- Place of death: Addis Ababa, Ethiopia
- Position: Forward

Senior career*
Years	Team	Apps	(Gls)
1956–1972	Saint George		

International career
1959–1970	Ethiopia	98	(61)

Managerial career
- Saint George
- 1980–1982: Ethiopia
- Ethiopian Insurance F.C.
- EEPCO F.C.
- CBE SA
- Wonji Sugar
Medal record
Representing Ethiopia
Men's football
Africa Cup of Nations
Winner	1962 Ethiopia
Third place	1959 United Arab Republic
- * Club domestic league appearances and goals

Mengistu Worku (Amharic: መንግሥቱ ወርቁ; 1940 – 16 December 2010) was an Ethiopian footballer, recognised as one of the best Ethiopian footballers in history with Luciano Vassalo and Yidnekatchew Tessema. He is best known for his role in the final of the 1962 African Nations Cup, and for being the head coach to take the Ethiopia national team to the African Nations Cup in Libya in 1982.

== Career ==
During the 1962 African Nations Cup, Mengistu scored one goal in the final of the 3rd African cup against Egypt, (Note: Mengistu Worku was initially credited with scoring twice in the final, but later, one of his goals in the 84th minute was attributed to Luciano Vassallo.) when Ethiopia won their first major trophy. He was named player of the tournament, the first Ethiopian to claim that award. Ethiopia scored the most in that tournament with four goals on the final. He debuted with Saint-George SA in 1957 and remained with the club for the entirety of his career. Mengistu was given numerous offers to play professionally for teams in Italy's Serie A and France, as well as Egypt's El Zamalek, but like earlier legend and coach Ydnekatchew, he refused all offers and stayed in Ethiopia wearing Saint George's characteristic "V" across his chest. Mengistu wore the number 8 for the entirety of his club and national team career. His international career began in 1958 and ended in 1970, following disappointment in the 7th African Nations cup in Sudan, where Ethiopia finished bottom of their group. He still managed to score three goals, the only Ethiopian goals in that tournament. Mengistu played two more years with Saint George, retiring in 1972. He is the seventh-highest scorer in the history of the African Cup of Nations with ten goals.

Mengistu coached the national team after retirement, but the team failed to match the success it found during his playing days. He did, however, coach the country to their first-ever CECAFA cup title in 1987, when the tournament was hosted by Ethiopia.

In 2001, Mengistu was struck by a tumor, and doctors had told him he had only months to live. With treatment unavailable in Ethiopia, the Ethiopian billionaire Mohammed Al Amoudi paid for Mengistu to travel to South Africa for treatment. "It was because of Al Amoudi that I am standing before you today," he said on Ethiopian television.

At the 2002 CECAFA Cup, Mengistu was honored before the tournament kickoff by the Council for East and Central Africa Football Association, along with five other east African footballers and three referees, including Tesfaye Gebreyesus, the Ethiopian who refereed at three ACN tournaments.

== Career statistics ==
=== International goals ===
Scores and results list Ethiopia's goal tally first, score column indicates score after each Worku goal.

List of international goals scored by Mengistu Worku
No.	Date	Venue	Opponent	Score	Result	Competition	Ref.
1	14 January 1962	Hailé Sélassié Stadium, Addis Ababa, Ethiopia	Tunisia		4–2	1962 Africa Cup of Nations	
2	21 January 1962	Hailé Sélassié Stadium, Addis Ababa, Ethiopia	United Arab Republic	4–2	4–2	1962 Africa Cup of Nations	
3	28 November 1963	Accra Sports Stadium, Accra, Ghana	Tunisia		4–2	1963 Africa Cup of Nations	
4	13 May 1964	Olympic Stadium, Athens, Greece	Greece	1–2	1–3	Friendly	
5	19 February 1967	Khartoum Stadium, Khartoum, Sudan	Kenya	1–0	2–0	1967 East African Friendship Cup	
6	19 February 1967	Khartoum Stadium, Khartoum, Sudan	Kenya	2–0	2–0	1967 East African Friendship Cup	
7	16 January 1968	Hailé Sélassié Stadium, Addis Ababa, Ethiopia	Algeria	1–0	3–1	1968 Africa Cup of Nations	
8	19 January 1968	Hailé Sélassié Stadium, Addis Ababa, Ethiopia	DR Congo	1–2	2–3	1968 Africa Cup of Nations	
9	4 May 1969	Hailé Sélassié Stadium, Addis Ababa, Ethiopia	Sudan	1–1	1–1	1970 FIFA World Cup qualification	
10	8 February 1970	Khartoum Stadium, Khartoum, Sudan	Cameroon	1–0	2–3	1970 Africa Cup of Nations	
11	8 February 1970	Khartoum Stadium, Khartoum, Sudan	Cameroon	2–3	2–3	1970 Africa Cup of Nations	
12	10 February 1970	Khartoum Stadium, Khartoum, Sudan	Ivory Coast	1–2	1–6	1970 Africa Cup of Nations	

== Honours ==
Ethiopia

- African Cup of Nations: 1962

Individual

- African Cup of Nations Best Player: 1962
