= Luciano Vassallo =

Footballer (1935–2022)

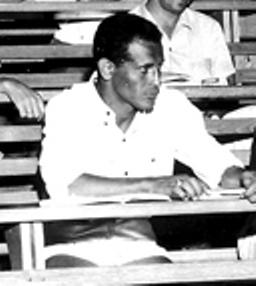
- Vassallo in 1968

Personal information
- Date of birth: 15 August 1935
- Place of birth: Asmara, Italian Eritrea
- Date of death: 16 September 2022 (aged 87)
- Place of death: Ostia, Italy
- Position: Midfielder

Youth career
- 1950–1952: Stella Asmarina
- 1952–1953: Ferrovieri Asmara

Senior career*
Years	Team	Apps	(Gls)
1953–1958	GS Gejeret		
1958–1960	Asmara Calcio		
1960–1973	Cotton Factory Club		

International career
1960–1971	Ethiopia	104	(47)

Managerial career
- 1968–1973: Cotton Factory Club
- 1969–1970: Ethiopia
- 1974: Ethiopia
- 1974: Saint George
- 1975: Air Force FC
- 1976: EEPCO F.C.
- 1978: Ethiopia
Medal record
Representing Ethiopia
Men's football
Africa Cup of Nations
Winner	1962 Ethiopia
- * Club domestic league appearances and goals

Luciano Vassallo (15 August 1935 – 16 September 2022), also spelled Luciano Vassalo, was an Ethiopian footballer who played as a midfielder. Born in Italian Eritrea, he played for the Ethiopia national team in the 1960s, captaining the winning team at the 1962 African Cup of Nations, Ethiopia's only trophy to date. He was known for his skill, and mostly for his volleys, free kicks and penalties. He played professionally with Cotton Factory Club along with his half-brother Italo.

== Early life ==
Luciano was born in Asmara to Vittorio Vassallo, an officer in the Italian rifle regiment and an Eritrean woman called Mebrak Abraham. Vittorio was transferred to Addis Ababa in 1937 and they never heard from him again. As mixed-race children they were marginalised at school and treated with contempt due to the Italian racial laws. This led Luciano to drop out of school during the third grade and study as a mechanic at a railway workshop.

Luciano initially began playing football for Stella Asmarina, a team set up by the Vicarage Apostolic exclusively for Italo-Eritrean children. He started his footballing career as a left-back, before being moved to centre back then eventually into midfield where he became known as an advanced playmaker with a powerful shot.

== Club career ==
Luciano played for GS Gejeret and GS Asmara, an Ethiopian team as Eritrea had been annexed in 1950. He signed to play for Cotton Factory Club of Dire Dawa in 1960, where, along with his half-brother, he won the Ethiopian First Division in 1960, 1962, 1963 and 1965. Luciano credited his experience as a mechanic for getting a job at the associated cotton plantation, which allowed him to receive a salary ten times that of a normal worker.

== International career ==
Luciano played for the Ethiopia national team in the qualifying rounds for the 1962 FIFA World Cup. With his half-brother Italo, Luciano was part of the 1962 African Cup of Nations campaign, when Ethiopia won their only trophy to date. Prior to the campaign he was told to change his first and last name in order to sound like a real Ethiopian, which he refused. Luciano, captain of the team, scored two goals in the semifinal against Tunisia and the equalizer against Egypt in the final, (Note: Mengistu Worku was initially credited with scoring twice in the final, but later, one of his goals in the 84th minute was attributed to Luciano Vassallo.) before winning in extra time, thus he was tied for top scorer in the tournament with three goals along with Badawi Abdel Fattah. He was handed the trophy by His Highness Haile Selassie, despite an attempt to remove him from the captaincy in order to allow for an Ethiopian player to lift the trophy.

In 2006, CAF began the selection for the best African footballer in the last fifty years. Luciano, along with legendary teammate and friend Mengistu Worku were selected in the group of the top 50 players, as the only Ethiopians, but were not selected in the final 30, where Roger Milla was named number one. Many consider Vassallo to be the best Ethiopian footballer in history, after Worku and Ydnekatchew Tessema.

== Managerial career ==
Vassallo then went to study as a coach at Coverciano in Florence, Italy. He went on to coach Ethiopia national team on several occasions.

During the Red Terror, Luciano Vassallo was arrested after he denounced the use of the amphetamine Captagon that was being used by the Ethiopian national team. He was stripped of his duties as coach and was set to be taken away by Mengistu Haile Mariam's soldiers however one of the colonels recognised his footballing hero and let him go.

He was reinstated as national team manager in 1978 but, two weeks after a historic win over East Germany, he fled to Djibouti then to Rome, where he had sent his family to safety some months earlier.

== After football ==
In exile in Italy, Luciano began repairing cars in Ostia before opening his own garage and finally obtaining citizenship. Later he founded a school for young footballers called Olimpia Ostia. In 2000, he published a biography titled Mamma ecco I soldi or Mom here's the money. After retiring, he lived in Rome.

== Career statistics ==
=== International goals ===
Scores and results list Ethiopia's goal tally first, score column indicates score after each Vassallo goal.

List of international goals scored by Luciano Vassallo
No.	Date	Venue	Opponent	Score	Result	Competition	Ref.
1	19 March 1961	Haifa, Israel	Israel		2–3	1962 FIFA World Cup qualification	
2	14 January 1962	Hailé Sélassié Stadium, Addis Ababa, Ethiopia	Tunisia	1–2	4–2	1962 Africa Cup of Nations	
3	14 January 1962	Hailé Sélassié Stadium, Addis Ababa, Ethiopia	Tunisia	4–2	4–2	1962 Africa Cup of Nations	
4	21 January 1962	Hailé Sélassié Stadium, Addis Ababa, Ethiopia	United Arab Republic	2–2	4–2	1962 Africa Cup of Nations	
5	28 November 1963	Accra Sports Stadium, Accra, Ghana	Tunisia		4–2	1963 Africa Cup of Nations	
6	19 November 1965	Stade Chedly Zouiten, Tunis, Tunisia	Senegal	1–1	1–5	1965 Africa Cup of Nations	
7	12 January 1968	Hailé Sélassié Stadium, Addis Ababa, Ethiopia	Uganda		2–1	1968 Africa Cup of Nations	
8	16 January 1968	Hailé Sélassié Stadium, Addis Ababa, Ethiopia	Algeria	3–0	3–1	1968 Africa Cup of Nations	
9	19 January 1968	Hailé Sélassié Stadium, Addis Ababa, Ethiopia	Congo-Kinshasa	1–2	2–3	1968 Africa Cup of Nations	

== Honours ==
Ethiopia

- African Cup of Nations: 1962

Individual

- African Cup of Nations top scorer: 1962 (shared with Badawi Abdel Fattah)

== See also ==
- Italian Eritreans
- Italians of Ethiopia
- Italo Vassallo

== Bibliography ==
- Felici, Antonio. Stella d'Africa – La vita straordinaria di Luciano Vassallo, mito del calcio africano anni '60, esule in Italia Edizioni Coralli, Roma, 2014 (Excerpts) ISBN 9788890453694
- Vassallo, Luciano. Mamma ecco i soldi. Editore: Coralli. Roma, 2000 ISBN 8890453664
- Jonathan Wilson; Igor Rabiner; Luke Edwards; Michael Yokhin; David Ashton (2017). The Blizzard - The Football Quarterly: Issue Twenty Five. Blizzard Media Ltd. p. 161.
