= Antoinette Tidjani Alou =

Jamaican-Nigerien academic

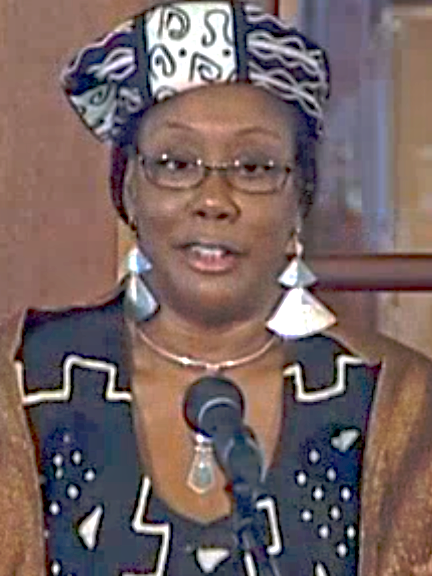
- Tidjani Alou in 2012
- Born: Jamaica
- Citizenship: Niger
- Occupations: Writer and academic
- Known for: Research into women's writing of the Sahel

Academic background
- Education: University of the West Indies; Bordeaux Montaigne University
- Thesis: Le premier théâtre claudélien : naissance du drame et drame de la naissance (1991)
- Doctoral advisor: Jack Corzani

Antoinette Tidjani Alou is a Jamaican-Nigerien academic, film-maker and writer, whose work focuses on the constructions of Sahelian identity in written and oral literature, as well as women in Sahelian identities. She published a novel On m'appelle Nina in 2016 and a collection of poems with a memoir Tina shot me between the eyes and other stories in 2017. She is a lecturer in Comparative Literature and in 2016 was appointed Coordinator of the Arts and Culture Department at Abdou Moumouni University in Niger.

== Early life and education ==
Antoinette Tidjani Alou was born in Jamaica and her secondary education took place at Convent of Mercy Academy 'Aplaha' in Kingston. She studied at the University of the West Indies in Kingston where she obtained a Bachelor of Arts degree. She continued her studies and was awarded a doctorate at the University Michel de Montaigne-Bordeaux 3. She defended her thesis in 1991 on the dramatic works of Paul Claudel.

== Teaching and research ==
Tidjani Alou began teaching French and comparative literature at Abdou Moumouni University in Niamey in 1994. She is a lecturer in Comparative Literature and in 2016 was appointed Coordinator of the Arts and Culture Department. Her research focuses on the constructions of Sahelian identity in written and oral literature, as well as the political constructions of identity. She is also an expert on depictions of the mytho-historical figure of Sarraounia.

In 2006, she was appointed president of the International Society for the Oral Literatures of Africa (ISOLA), a position she held for eight years. She has worked on the Women Writing Africa Project and is a member of the research group Literature, Gender and Development: Nigerien Visions and Perspectives.

== Literary career ==
Between her childhood in Jamaica, her university education in France, and her professional life in Niger, Tidjani Alou has adapted to different cultures. She published her first novel, On m'appelle Nina in 2016 with Présence Africaine. This autofiction retraces the journey of a woman, Vilhelminma, who leaves Jamaica to settle for love in Niger. The character finds herself confronted with a society that refuses to open up to her, considers her as a foreigner - a “white black”. She also deals with the variations of pain, trauma and bereavement, as the character has to deal with the death of her 16-year-old child. It drew comparisons with the works of Maryse Conde.

The following year, she published Tina shot me between the eyes and other stories, a collection of poems and a memoir, with the Senegalese publisher Amalion. In it she explores how the self is shaped and transformed by our relationships. She is also a freelance translator and screenwriter. She collaborated with the Cameroonian filmmaker Jean-Marie Teno in 2010 to write for the film Toutes voiles dehors.

== Selected publications ==
=== Creative writing ===
- On m'appelle Nina (Présence Africaine, 2016)
- Tina Shot Me Between the Eyes (Amalion, 2017)

=== Academic works ===
- Alou, Antoinette Tidjani. "Myths of a New World in Édouard Glissant's novels La Lézarde and Le Quatrième siècle." Tydskrif vir letterkunde 44.2 (2007): 163-187.
- Alou, Antoinette Tidjani. "Niger and Sarraounia: One Hundred Years of Forgetting Female Leadership." Research in African Literatures, vol. 40 no. 1, 2009, p. 42-56.
- Alou, Antoinette Tidjani, Arinpe Gbekelolu Adejumo, and Asonzeh Ukah. Africans and the politics of popular culture. Vol. 42. University Rochester Press, 2009.
- Tidjani Alou, Antoinette. "Ancestors from the East, Spirits from the West. Surviving and Reconfiguring the Exogenous Violence of Global Encounters in the Sahel." Journal des africanistes 80-1/2 (2010): 75-92.
- Tidjani-Alou, Antoinette. “‘Back to Africa, Miss Mattie?’: Autobiographical Notes from Global Africa on Apprehending Texts and Subtexts of Popular Culture.” The Global South, vol. 5, no. 2, 2011, pp. 139–53.
- Alou, Antoinette Tidjani, and Jean-Pierre Olivier de Sardan. Epistemology, fieldwork, and anthropology. Springer, 2016.
- Alou, Antoinette Tidjani. "Reel Resistance: the Cinema of Jean-Marie Teno." Tydskrif vir Letterkunde 57.2 (2020): 113-114.
- Alou, Antoinette Tidjani. "Sarraounia, love, and the postcolony." Tydskrif vir Letterkunde 59.3 (2022): 27-34.
