= Amalion =

Senegalese publisher

Amalion is a multilingual independent academic publishing house based in Dakar, Senegal.

== History ==
Amalion is an independent pan-African publishing house based in Dakar, created in 2009. Amalion publishes scholarly knowledge from various parts of Africa, and across linguistic boundaries. Amalion's logo is represented by the head of a lion in a plethora of colors representing the diversity of the African continent.

The first book released by Amalion in June 2009 is a collection of poetry from the Ugandan writer Mildred Kiconco Barya entitled Give Me Room To Move My Feet. Since then, the house has published other works, including A History of the Yoruba People by Stephen Adebanji Akintoye (2010), La dette odieuse de l'Afrique, by Léonce Ndikumana and James Boyce (2013) on the links between debt, capital flight and development in Africa; Wala Bok: Une histoire orale du hip hop au Sénégal, (2015) by Fatou Kandé Senghor on the evolution of rap and the emergence of youth activism in Senegal and My Life Has a Price, by Tina Okpara (2012), a searing story of freedom from modern slavery. Amalion also published The Promise of Hope (2014), the last work of the Ghanaian poet Kofi Awoonor, who died in the terrorist attack on Westgate shopping mall in Nairobi in 2013, within the African Poetry Book Series project coordinated by the poet Kwame Dawes. In 2016, the work of the renowned Nigerian historian Mahmud Modibbo Tukur British colonisation of Northern Nigeria, 1897-1914 is released. Amalion is also involved with Jacana Literary Foundation and some publishing houses around Africa in the creation of the new Gerald Kraak Award and Anthology for the promotion of gender and human rights launched in 2016.

Amalion titles cover literary fiction, social sciences, development studies, biographies, arts and politics aimed for academics and the general public.

== Published authors ==
- Mildred Kiconco Barya
- Louis Camara
- Tina Okpara
- Ibrahima Amadou Niang
- Kofi Awoonor
- Clifton Gachagua
- Kevin Eze
- Stephen Adebanji Akintoye
- Anthonia Makwemoisa
- Enyinna Chuta
- Léonce Ndikumana
- fr:James K. Boyce
- fr:Jean-Bernard Ouédraogo
- Rotimi Williams Olatunji
- Beatrice Adeyinka Laninhun
- Tope Omoniyi
- fr:Fatou Kande Senghor
- Mahmud Modibbo Tukur
- Tade Akin Aina
- Bhekinkosi Moyo
- Fabrizio Terenzio
- Antoinette Tidjani Alou
- Akwasi Aidoo
