= Léonce Ndikumana =

Burundian researcher

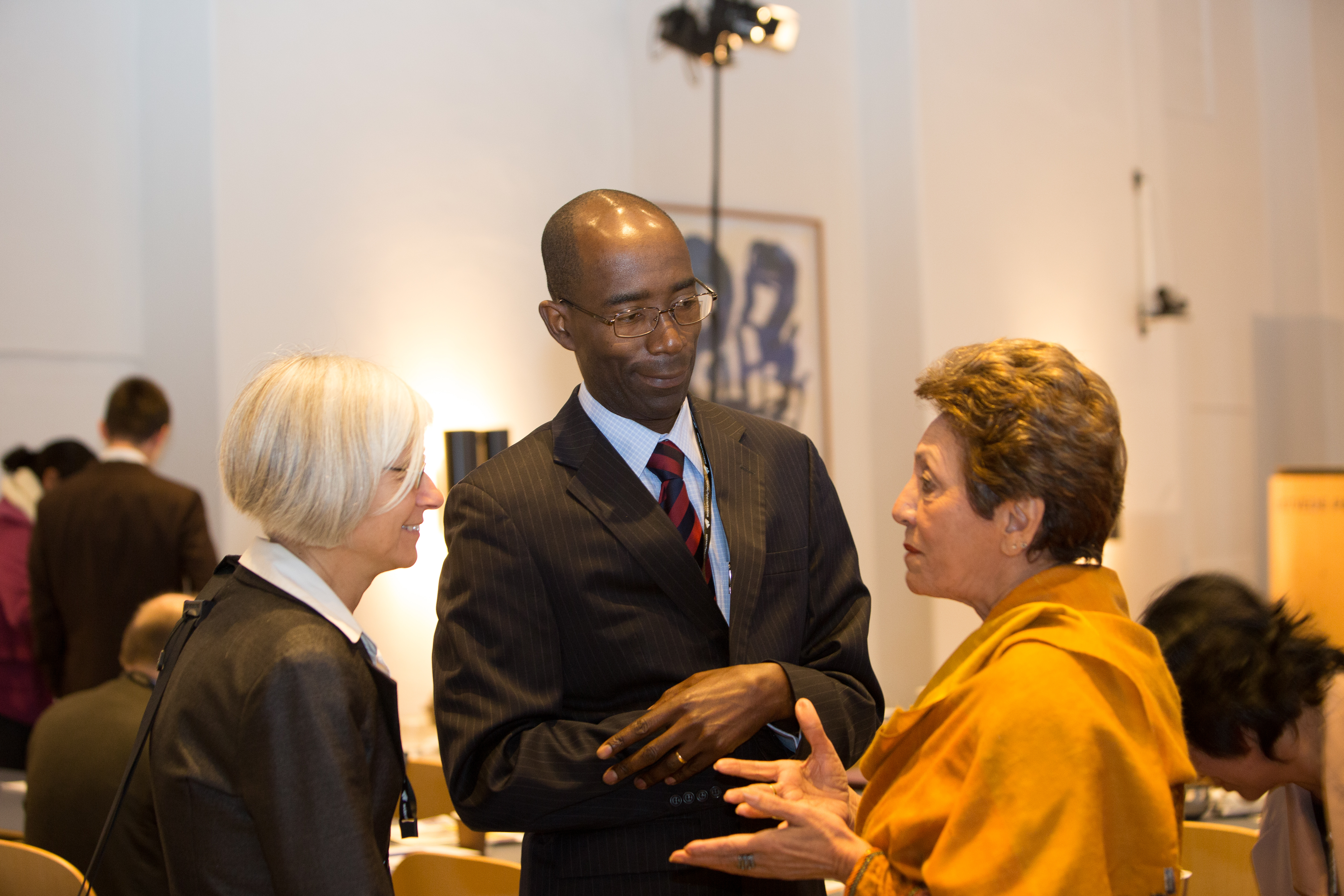
From left to right: Caren Grown, Léonce Ndikumana, Attiya Inayatullah (2013)

Léonce Ndikumana is a Burundian Professor of Economics and specialist in African economic development, macroeconomics, external debt and capital flight.

== Biography ==
Ndikumana got his bachelor's degree in economics at the University of Burundi in 1986. He became a lecturer in 1987 and finally Director of Finance and Administration at the same university. In 1992, he got a Masters in Economics and in 1996 his doctorate at the Washington University in St. Louis, United States. He is currently Distinguished Professor of Economics and Director of the Africa Development Program at the Institute of Research at Political Economy Research Institute (PERI) at the University of Massachusetts Amherst in the United States.

Ndikumana is particularly interested in the macro-economic policy and in Africa economy. He focuses his career on the causes of weak African economies, its consequences and solutions needed. He is a member of the United Nations Development Policy Committee. He served as Director of Research and Operations of the African Development Bank (2008–2011), and Head of macroeconomic analysis at the United Nations Economic Commission for Africa (UNECA or Economic Commission for Africa), Addis Ababa, Ethiopia from 2006 to 2008. He specializes on external debt and capital flight, financial markets and growth, and macroeconomic policies for growth and employment with a focus on the Africa.

== Scientific activity ==
Léonce Ndikumana focuses primarily on African economy development, macroeconomic theory, and money and banking. He has examined the extent, causes and effects the flight of capital from African countries. He has co-written with James K. Boyce research published in several journals: International Review of Applied Economics, African Development Review, Development and Change, Journal of Development Studies and World Development. His préoccupations on macroeconomics are also published in journals such as American Economic Review, Journal of Post Keynesian Economics, and Journal of African Economies.

Ndikumana is also author of several works. In La dette odieuse de l’Afrique (Amalion, 2013), co-written with James K. Boyce, Ndikumana reveals that, contrary to popular perception that Africa depends on financial resources of the West, the continent is actually a net creditor to the rest of the world.

His volume "On the Trail of Capital Flight from Africa. The Takers and the Enablers", co-edited with James K. Boyce (Oxford University Press, 2022) reveals the complex network of actors and enablers that facilitate capital flight from Angola, Côte d'Ivoire and South Africa.

== Honors and awards ==
- In 2021, Ndikumana received the Andrew Carnegie Fellowship, with a grant to support research on capital flight in Africa.
- In 2018, Ndikumana received the Chancellor's Medal, the highest award given by the Chancellor to faculty for scholarship. He delivered the Distinguished Faculty Lecture for 2017-2018.
- In 2017, Ndikumana won the UMass Alumni Association Distinguished Faculty Award
- In 2013, Ndikumana won the UMass Award for outstanding achievements in research and créatrice activity
- Spotlight scholar 2013.
- He is a member of the Policy Committee for development of the United Nation.
- Honorary Professor of Economics at the University of Cape Town in South Africa.
- Honorary Professor of Economics at the University of Stellenbosch in South Africa
- Dudley Seers Memorial Prize for the best article in Volume 38 of the Development Studies (article co-authored with James K. Boyce).
- Exceptional Teacher Award, 2001-2002.
- Nominated for the Distinguished Teacher Award, 1999.
