= Abdelmajid Chetali =

Tunisian footballer (born 1939)

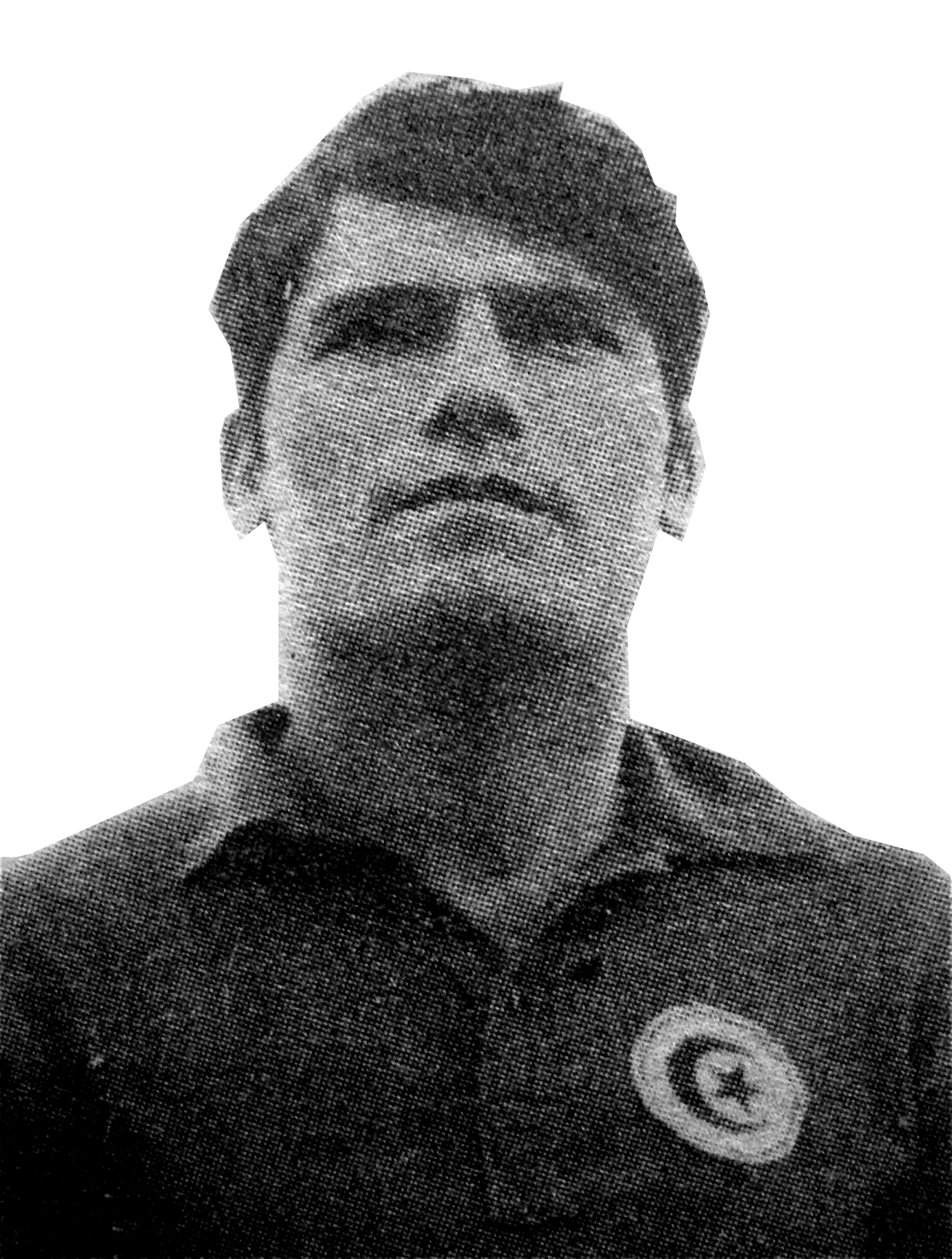
- Chetali with Tunisia in the 1970s

Personal information
- Full name: Abdelmajid Al-Chetali
- Date of birth: 4 July 1939 (age 87)
- Place of birth: Sousse, Tunisia
- Height: 1.77 m (5 ft 10 in)
- Position: Midfielder

Senior career*
Years	Team	Apps	(Gls)
1957–1968	Étoile du Sahel		

International career
1959–1965	Tunisia	70	(4)

Managerial career
- 1970–1975: Étoile du Sahel
- 1975–1978: Tunisia
- 1979–1980: Al Ain
- 1983–1985: Al-Wehda
- 1988: Bahrain
- 2004–2005: Étoile du Sahel
- * Club domestic league appearances and goals

Abdelmajid Al-Chetali (Arabic: عبد المجيد الشتالي; born 4 July 1939) is a Tunisian football coach and former player who played 70 games with the national team and scored four goals. He also participated in the 1960 Summer Olympics.

He is considered one of the characters who shaped and prolonged the legend of the Étoile Sportive du Sahel (nicknamed Majda). He received only one yellow card during his career.

As a manager, he led them in their first ever World Cup appearance in 1978, where Tunisia became the first African team to win a World Cup match, beating Mexico 3–1, and making FIFA increase the number of World Cup slots in the African continent from one to two. During his managerial career, he was in charge of two national teams: the Tunisian and Bahraini national football teams. He also managed his home club Étoile du Sahel and achieved good results with it.

== Playing career ==
Born in Sousse into a family of footballers, Chetali began his career at the Corniche and joined the Etoile Sportive du Sahel (ESS) in 1957 to the position of midfielder and team captain.

He started for the first time in the national team by Yugoslav coach Milan Kristić as a semi-offensive (between the attacking midfielder and the center forward) and he imposed himself in the Tunisian midfield game.

He competed in the 1960 Summer Olympics, but his team lost all of their games and did not score goals. In 1961, he participated in the 1962 African Cup of Nations qualification and qualified Tunisia against Nigeria by scoring away with a goal in the 65th minute, but he missed the finals of the competition because he was a victim as few of his teammates of a Malaria crisis. He nevertheless participated in the 1963 African Cup of Nations after having played and lost the final of the Friendship Games in Dakar against Senegal.

At the 1965 African Cup of Nations held in Tunisia, he was captain of the selection. His team did a great competition before reaching the final against Ghana on 21 November. He scored a goal, which allowed Tunisia to equalize, but Ghana finally won the competition after extra time.

== Coaching career ==
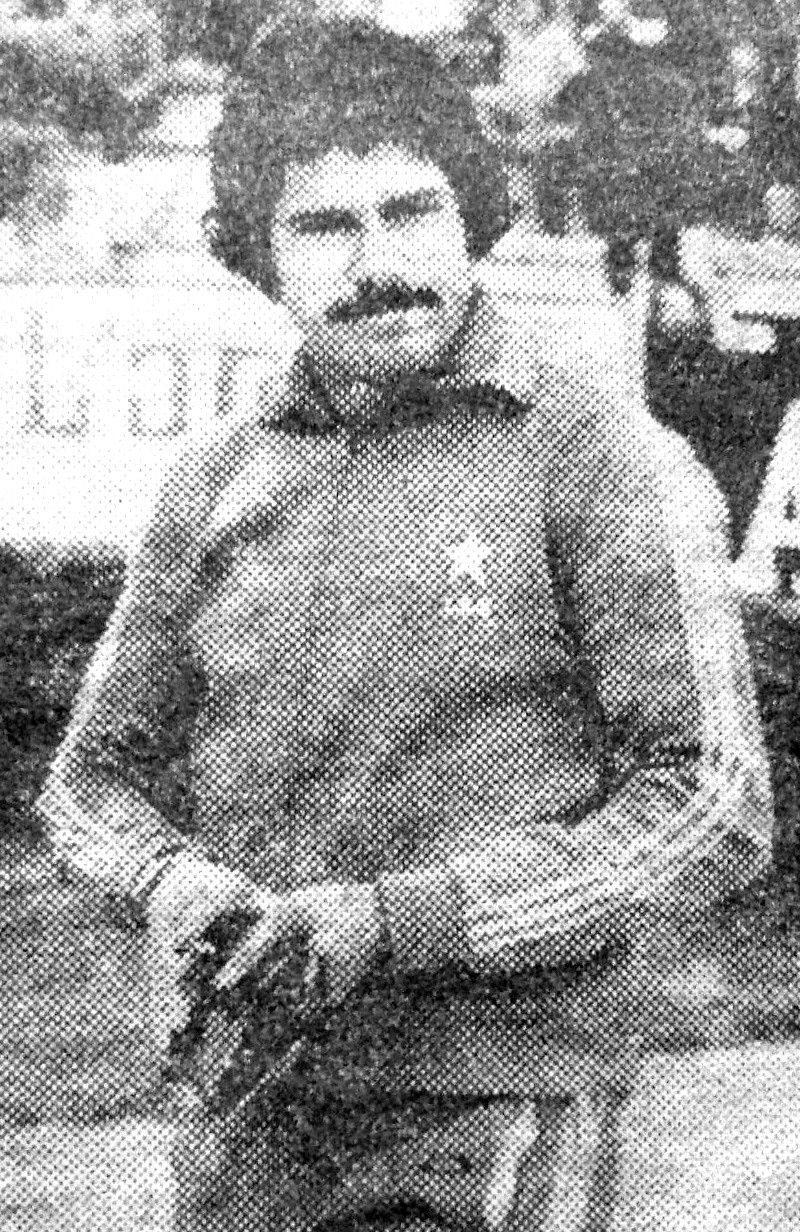
Chetali managing Étoile du Sahel in 1973

He left the Étoile du Sahel in 1968 and returned as a coach from 1970 to 1975. He made good results winning the Tunisian League and Maghreb Champions Cup in 1972 and two Tunisian Cups in 1974 and 1975. He graduated from the Cologne Higher Institute (Germany) in 1974, so he was called in January 1975 to coach the national team. At the 1978 African Cup of Nations, he reached the semi-final but left the competition with a two-year exclusion from the African Cup of Nations for unsportsmanlike behavior.

However, the team qualified for the first time for the World Cup finals in 1978, becoming the first African team to win a match (against Mexico by 3 goals to 1). However, his team didn't pass the first round because, after this victory, the Tunisians lost their second match against Poland by 1 goal to 0. They then draw with Germany on a virgin score. But this relatively good performance allows the African continent to benefit from an additional place for the 1982 FIFA World Cup, with two places.

With this great achievement and despite the many offers, he preferred to stay away from this training, but he had a short experience in 9th Arabian Gulf Cup with Bahrain national football team reaching the semi-finals. He returned to Étoile du Sahel as a coach for a few months in 2004, replacing Mrad Mahjoub, who was forced to resign after the elimination of the team in the Tunisian Cup semi-final. He achieved the second place in 2004 CAF Champions League after losing against the Nigerian Side Enyimba with penalties.

== Consultant ==
He has been a sports consultant for the American TV channel ESPN since 1998. He has analyzed three World Cups, four African Cups of Nations, two Asian Cups, three Copa América as well as the Italian, Spanish and English Leagues and the UEFA Champions League in Aljazeera Sport.

In March 2007, he was appointed technical advisor to the Saudi Arabian Football Federation.

== Managerial statistics ==
Team	From	To	Record					
Team	From	To	G	W	D	L	Win %	Ref
Tunisia	12 February 1975	20 December 1978	52	18	18	16	34.62	
Total			52	18	18	16	34.62	—

== Honours ==
=== As Player ===
Étoile du Sahel

- Tunisian Ligue Professionnelle 1: 1957–58, 1962–63, 1965–66
- Tunisian Cup: 1958–59, 1962–63

Tunisia

- Africa Cup of Nations third place: 1962; runner-up: 1965
- Arab Cup: 1963

=== As Manager ===
Étoile du Sahel

- Tunisian Ligue Professionnelle 1: 1971–72
- Tunisian Cup: 1973–74, 1974–75
- Maghreb Champions Cup: 1973
- Maghreb Cup Winners Cup: 1975
- CAF Champions League runner-up: 2004

Tunisia

- Palestine Cup of Nations: 1973
- Africa Cup of Nations fourth place: 1978

Bahrain

- Arabian Gulf Cup fourth place: 1988
