= 1962 African Cup of Nations qualification =

Football tournament

This page details the process of qualifying for the 1962 African Cup of Nations. Seven African nations initially entered the competition. Ethiopia and the United Arab Republic both automatically qualified as the host country and title holders respectively. Sudan withdrew before the draw, and Morocco would withdraw before play began, thus leaving only five teams competing for the two spots remaining in the finals.

== Qualified teams ==
The 4 qualified teams are:

- United Arab Republic (holders)
- Ethiopia (hosts)
- Tunisia
- Uganda

== Summary ==
The six nations that entered the draw were paired and played knock-out matches home-and-away. The 3 winners would then advance to the second round and pair off again to play home-and-away matches. The winners of these pairings would qualify for the finals. Qualifying took place between 8 April 1961, and 10 December 1961.

== Qualifying tournament ==
=== First round ===
Sudan withdrew before the draw.

Team 1	Agg.	Team 2	1st leg	2nd leg	3rd leg
Tunisia	w/o	Morocco	—	—	
Nigeria	2–2 (d.l.)	Ghana	0–0	2–2	
Kenya	1–3	Uganda	0–1	1–0	0–2

Tunisia	Cancelled	Morocco
		Withdrew

Stade Géo André, Tunis

Morocco	Cancelled	Tunisia
Withdrew

Stade d'Honneur, Casablanca

Tunisia advanced to the Second Round after the withdrawal of Morocco; both matches were officially awarded to Tunisia 2–0.

8 April 1961

Nigeria	0–0	Ghana

Surulere Stadium, Lagos
30 April 1961

Ghana	2–2	Nigeria
Acquah 34'; Aggrey-Fynn 88'		Onyeali 50'; Fayemi 75'

Accra Sports Stadium, Accra

The aggregate score was tied 2-2 after the two matches; Nigeria advanced to the Second Round after drawing lots.

5 August 1961

Kenya	0–1	Uganda
		Odong 17'

Nairobi City Stadium, Nairobi
23 September 1961

Uganda	0–1	Kenya
		Opicho 75'

Nakivubo Stadium, Kampala

The aggregate score was tied 1-1 after the two matches. While the regulations stipulated that the tie should be decided on lots, Kenya and Uganda felt it should be decided on the pitch: CAF agreed to their request to stage a playoff.

Playoff

29 October 1961

Uganda	2–0	Kenya
Ssewava 50'; Fauza 80'

Nakivubo Stadium, Kampala

Uganda advanced.

=== Second round ===
Team 1	Agg.	Team 2	1st leg	2nd leg
Nigeria	2–3	Tunisia	2–1	0–2
Uganda	Bye			

25 November 1961

Nigeria	2–1	Tunisia
Noquapor 30', 84'		Klibi 25'

Surulere Stadium, Lagos
10 December 1961

Tunisia	2–2 (end score at 65') 2–0 (awarded)	Nigeria
Chérif 21'; Chetali 65'		Onyeawuna 12'; Igweonu 25'

Stade Chedly Zouiten, Tunis

The second leg was abandoned in the 65th minute after Nigeria walked off to protest the officiating following Tunisia's equalizer; Tunisia were awarded a 2–0 victory, and qualified by an aggregate score of 3–2.

Uganda qualified directly after a drawing of lots by CAF between the three group winners.
