= Italo Vassallo =

Italo-Eritrean footballer (1940–2021)

Personal information
- Date of birth: 1940
- Place of birth: Asmara, Italian East Africa
- Date of death: 30 July 2021 (aged 80–81)
- Position: Forward

Senior career*
Years	Team	Apps	(Gls)
1957–1960	Hamasien		
1961–1973	Cotton Factory Club		

International career
1962–1971	Ethiopia	10+	(4+)
- * Club domestic league appearances and goals

Italo Vassallo (1940 – 30 July 2021) was an Italian-Eritrean footballer. He played for Ethiopia internationally, scoring in their 1962 Africa Cup of Nations final victory over Egypt. His half-brother is Luciano Vassallo, a former footballer for the Ethiopian team.

== Club career ==
Vassallo made his debut at Hamasien where he won the Ethiopian First Division for the first time in 1957.

When Vassallo's half-brother Luciano moved to Cotton Factory Club, Italo joined him at 17 years old. They would go on to win the Ethiopian First Division four times at Cotton FC before retiring in 1973.

== International career ==
Once Eritrean-born footballers were allowed to be called up for the national team, Italo and Luciano were selected for the 1962 Africa Cup of Nations. Italo scored a goal in Ethiopia's extra-time victory in the final against Egypt.

== After football ==
During the Eritrean–Ethiopian War, Italo was expelled from Ethiopia and returned to Eritrea. He ran a restaurant in Asmara.

== Career statistics ==
=== International goals ===
Scores and results list Ethiopia's goal tally first, score column indicates score after each Vassallo goal.

List of international goals scored by Italo Vassallo
No.	Date	Venue	Opponent	Score	Result	Competition	Ref.
1	21 January 1962	Hailé Sélassié Stadium, Addis Ababa, Ethiopia	United Arab Republic	3–2	4–2	1962 Africa Cup of Nations	
2	21 February 1965	Kampala, Uganda	Uganda	2–1	2–1	1965 Africa Cup of Nations qualification	
3	27 March 1965	Khartoum, Sudan	Sudan		1–2	1965 Africa Cup of Nations qualification	
4	4 April 1965	Addis Ababa, Ethiopia	Kenya	1–0	2–1	1965 Africa Cup of Nations qualification	

=== International ===
Ethiopia

- Africa Cup of Nations: 1962

== See also ==
- Luciano Vassallo
- GS Asmara
- Italians of Ethiopia
- Italian Eritreans
- Giovanni De Min (footballer)
