= Stephen Adebanji Akintoye =

Nigerian-American historian (born 1935)

Stephen Adebanji Akintoye, also known as S. Banji Akintoye (born 1935), is a Nigerian-born academic, historian and writer. He attended Christ's School Ado Ekiti, Nigeria from 1951–1955, and studied history at the University College (Overseas College of the University of London), Ibadan (1956–1961), and doctoral studies from 1963-1966 at the University of Ibadan, where he was awarded a PhD in History in 1966. He taught at the History Department at Obafemi Awolowo University, Ile-Ife, Nigeria, where he became a professor and Director of the Institute of African Studies from 1974-1977. He has also taught African History in universities in the United States including the University of South Florida, Tampa, Florida; Montgomery County Community College, PA, and Eastern University, St. Davids, Pennsylvania. Akintoye has written four books, chapters in many joint books, and several articles in scholarly journals. He took a leading part for some time in the politics of Nigeria and served on the Nigerian Senate from 1979–1983 during the Second Republic. He currently lives in Cotonoue, Benin Republic. Akintoye is one of the current leading scholars on the history of the Yoruba people. His most recent work, A History of the Yoruba People (Amalion, 2010), draws on decades of new findings and thinking on Yoruba studies that challenges some previously dominant notions about the origins of the Yoruba. This work dispels the Middle Eastern and Arabia origins propounded by such scholars as the late Samuel Johnson (1846–1901) and also gave prominence to the works on the Pre-Oduduwa Period by Ulli Beier among others. Akintoye also gave prominence to the role of Ilé-Ifè over that of Oyo. A reviewer, Wale Adebanwi, notes: "...this book directly contests and shifts th e focus of Yoruba history away from what many have called the Oyo-centric account of Samuel Johnson... Where Johnson avoids the creation myth that positions Ife as the sacred locus of Oduduwa's original descent and the orirun (creation-source), Akintoye, justifiably, restores Ile-Ife to its proper place as "ibi ojumo ti mon wa'ye" (where the dawn emerges)..."

== Works ==
- A History of the Yoruba People, Amalion, 2010; ISBN 978-2-35926-005-2;
- Revolution and Power Politics in Yorubaland 1840-93, Longman, 1971; ISBN 978-0-582-64533-2;
- Ten Years of the University of Ife, 1962-72. Ife University Press, 1973;
- Emergent States of Africa: Topics in 20th Century African History, Longman, 1976; ISBN 978-0-582-60127-7
