= Tekle Kidane =

Ethiopian footballer (born 1939)

Tekle Kidane (born 30 August 1939) is a former football player. In his early days, Tekle (nickname: Tekle Silki) played among the best international (Ethiopian) football players with former Ethiopian national team.

== Career ==
From 1954 to 1955, at the age of 15–16 years, he was a player in a Second Division team called Gageret Football Team. Then, in the years from 1956 to 1970 he played as a striker in the First Division with Telecommunication Football Team, which won the Ethiopian Nations Club Championship in 1958, 1969 and 1970. Tekle Kidane participated during that time in scoring many remarkable goals for his team.

He was also a member of the Ethiopian national team, contributing to their victory in the Third African Cup of Nations. In the final, he scored a goal in the 4–2 extra-time win against Egypt.

Tekle Kidane also played with Omedla Team in Addis Abeba for a couple of seasons, he also was a coach of Serae Football Team and Dahlak Shoe Factory Football Team in Asmara.

== Honours ==
Ethiopia

- African Cup of Nations: 1962
