= Mimi El-Sherbini =

Egyptian footballer (1938–2025)

Personal information
- Full name: Mohamed Abdel-Latif El-Sherbini
- Date of birth: 26 July 1938
- Place of birth: Mansoura, Egypt
- Date of death: 20 January 2025 (aged 86)
- Place of death: Mansoura, Egypt
- Position: Defender

Senior career*
Years	Team	Apps	(Gls)
1957–1971	Al-Ahly		

International career
1958–1969	Egypt		

Managerial career
- Mansoura
- 1971–1975: Al-Nasr (Dubai)
- 1975: United Arab Emirates
- 1981–1982: Ghazl Domiat
Medal record
Men's Football
Representing United Arab Republic
Africa Cup of Nations
Winner	1959 United Arab Republic
Runner-up	1962 Ethiopia
Third place	1963 Ghana
- * Club domestic league appearances and goals

Mohamed Abdel-Latif "Mimi" El-Sherbini (Arabic: ميمي محمد عبد اللطيف الشربيني; 26 July 1938 – 20 January 2025) was an Egyptian footballer who played as a defender for Al-Ahly and the Egyptian national team. He took part in the 1959 Africa Cup of Nations, scoring in Egypt's 4–0 victory against Ethiopia, and went on to win the tournament with the team. He also represented his country in the 1960 and 1964 Summer Olympics.

After retiring, El-Sherbini moved into management, and was briefly in charge of the United Arab Emirates national team in 1975. He died on 20 January 2025, at the age of 86. According to news reports, he suffered from Alzheimer's disease and eventually died at Al-Salam Hospital in his hometown of Mansoura.

== Honours ==
United Arab Republic

- African Cup of Nations: 1959; runner-up, 1962; 3rd place, 1963
