= 1957 African Cup of Nations final =

- Event: 1957 African Cup of Nations
Egypt	Ethiopia
(Egypt)	(Ethiopia)
4	0
- Date: 16 February 1957
- Venue: Municipal Stadium, Khartoum
- Referee: Mohammed Youssef (Sudan)
- Attendance: 30,000

The 1957 African Cup of Nations final was a football match that took place on 16 February 1957 at the Municipal Stadium in Khartoum, Sudan, to determine the winner of the 1957 African Cup of Nations, the football championship of Africa organized by the Confederation of African Football (CAF).

Egypt beat Ethiopia 4−0, with all four goals scored by Ad-Diba.

== Road to the final ==
Egypt		Round	Ethiopia
Opponent	Result	Knockout stage	Opponent	Result
Sudan	2–1	Semifinals	South Africa	2–0^{1}

^{1} The match was scratched and Ethiopia advanced to the final as South Africa were disqualified due to apartheid.

== Match details ==
=== Details ===
16 February 1957

Egypt	4–0	Ethiopia
Ad-Diba 2', 7', 68', 89'	Report

Municipal Stadium, Khartoum
Attendance: 30,000
Referee: Mohammed Youssef (Sudan)

Egypt	Ethiopia

GK	Brascos
RB	Nour El-Dali
CB	Mosaad Daoud
CB	Rifaat El-Fanagily
LB	Hanafi Bastan
RH	Samir Qotb
LH	Ibrahim Tawfik
OR	Ad-Diba
CF	Raafat Attia
CF	Alaa El-Hamouly
OL	Hamdi
Manager:
Mourad Fahmy

GK	Gila-Michael Tekle Mariam
RB	Adale Tekle Selassie
LB	Girmaye Fikre Mariam
RH	Mohammed Ibrahim
CH	Ayele Tessema
LH	Adamu Alemu
OR	Netsere Wolde Selassie
IR	Zewde Samuel
CF	Kebede Metaferia
IL	Asefaw Berhane
OL	Tekeste Goitom
Manager:
Zewde Moustafa

Assistant referees:
Mostefa Kamel Mansour (Egypt)
Gebeyehu Doube (Ethiopia)

Man of the Match:
Ad-Diba (Egypt)
