= Louis Camara =

Senegalese writer (born 1950)

Abdou Karim Camara (born 1950), better known as Louis Camara, is a Senegalese writer known for his short stories and tales.

== Biography ==
Camara was born in 1950 at the edge of the Senegal River in Saint-Louis, located 270 km from Dakar, Senegal. Researcher, novelist, and short story writer, Camara is passionate about Yoruba civilization and culture which remains its main source of inspiration. He taught at Université Gaston Berger in Saint Louis, Senegal. He has attended numerous festivals and was a guest at the Francophonies en Limousin Festival in Limoges, France. Until 2000, he worked at the Musée du Centre de Recherche et de documentation du Sénégal(CRDS) based in St. Louis. In 1996, he was awarded the Grand Prix du président de la république pour les lettres, the highest literary honor in Senegal for his most famous work Le Choix de l’Ori, "a tale that highlights the architecture, the rhythm, and style of black Africa", according to then-president Abdou Diouf. A revised and edited version of the novel is published by Amalion in 2015.

== Works ==
- Le Choix de l’Ori, Editions Amalion, Dakar, 2015, (ISBN 9782359260373)
- Au-dessus des dunes, Editions Athena édif, 2014, (ISBN 9782371320055)
- Histoire d’Iyewa ou les pièges de l’amour, Xamal Publishing, St. Louis 1998 (ISBN 9782844020130)
- Kankan le maléfique, Éditions Hurtubise HMH Quebec (ISBN 9782894284469)
- Le tambour d’Orunmila, NEAS, Dakar, 2003, (ISBN 9782723615525)
- La tragique histoire d’Aganoribi, Éditions Kalaama Dakar, 2005 (ISBN 9782915343052)
- Il pleut sur Saint-Louis, short stories, NEAS Dakar, 2007, (ISBN 9782723616478)
- Saint-Louis du Sénégal, Senegal, Editions Print Book, (ISBN 9782911589379)
- La forêt aux mille demons (French adaptation of "A Forest of a Thousand Daemons" by Wole Soyinka) EENAS Dakar, 2010 (ISBN 9780175112883)

== Awards ==
- Grand prix du président de la république du Sénégal pour les lettres in 1996,
- Leopold Sedar Senghor Foundation prize for the best short story in 1997,
- Chevalier des Palmes Académiques de la république française in 2010.
