= Giovanni De Min (footballer) =

Italian footballer

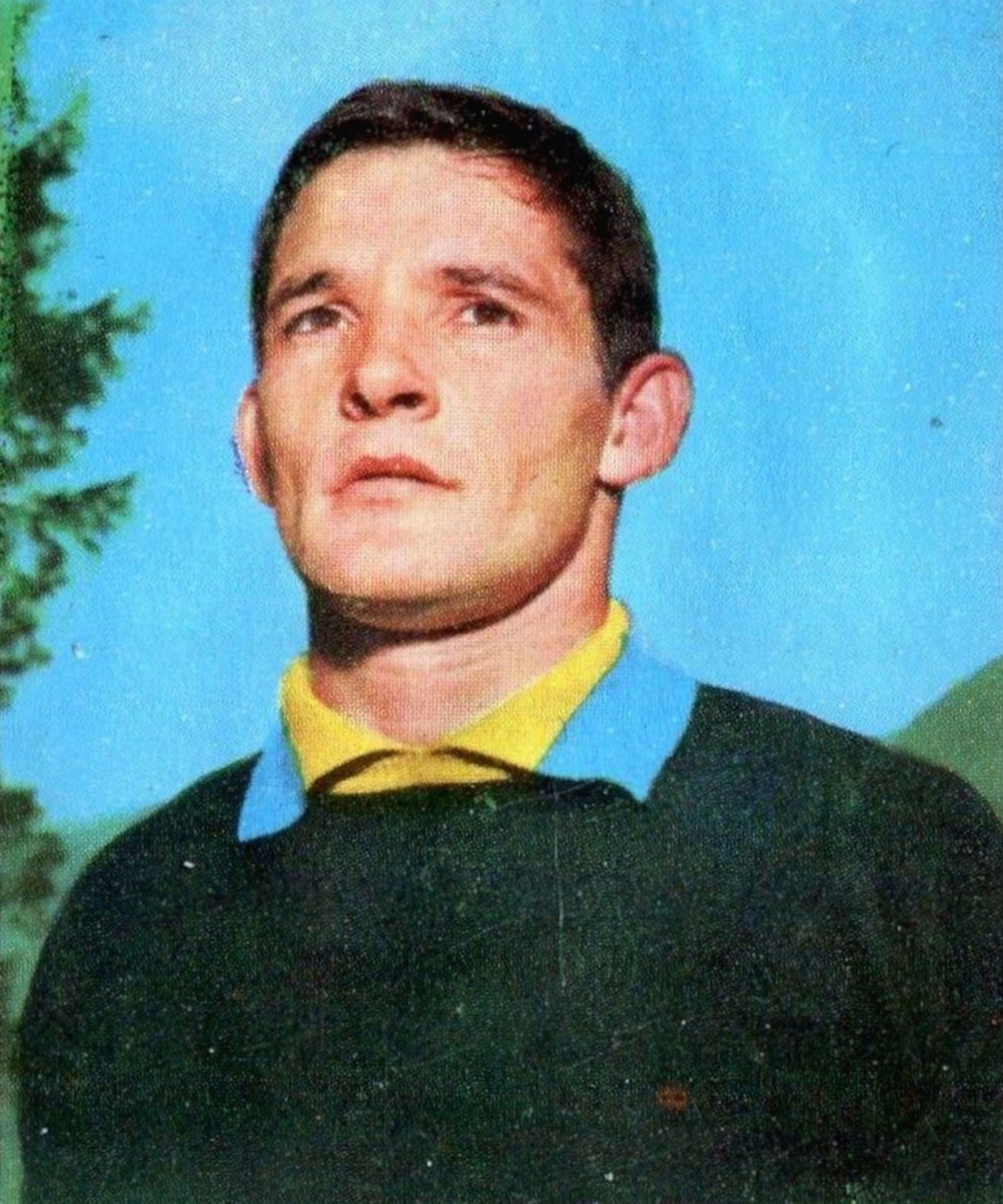
- De Min with Verona in 1967

Personal information
- Date of birth: May 28, 1940 (age 86)
- Place of birth: Asmara, Italian East Africa
- Height: 1.79 m (5 ft 10 1/2 in)
- Position: Goalkeeper

Senior career*
Years	Team	Apps	(Gls)
1959–1963	Triestina	19	(0)
1963–1964	Pisa	1	(0)
1964–1965	Vittorio Veneto	17	(0)
1965–1967	Pisa	36	(0)
1967–1970	Verona	52	(0)
1970–1972	Roma	4	(0)
1974–1977	Pistoiese	16	(0)
1978–1979	Montecatini	0	(0)
- * Club domestic league appearances and goals

Giovanni De Min (born May 28, 1940) is a retired Italian professional football player.

== Sport Life ==
In the late 1950s he moved with his family back to Italy. In 1959 started to be professional in the Triestina.

He played for 3 seasons (33 games) in the Serie A for Hellas Verona F.C. and A.S. Roma.

He is considered one of the best players of the Hellas Verona team in History.
