= Addis Ababa Stadium =

Stadium in Addis Ababa, Ethiopia

Coordinates: 9°0′47.9″N 38°45′23.1″E

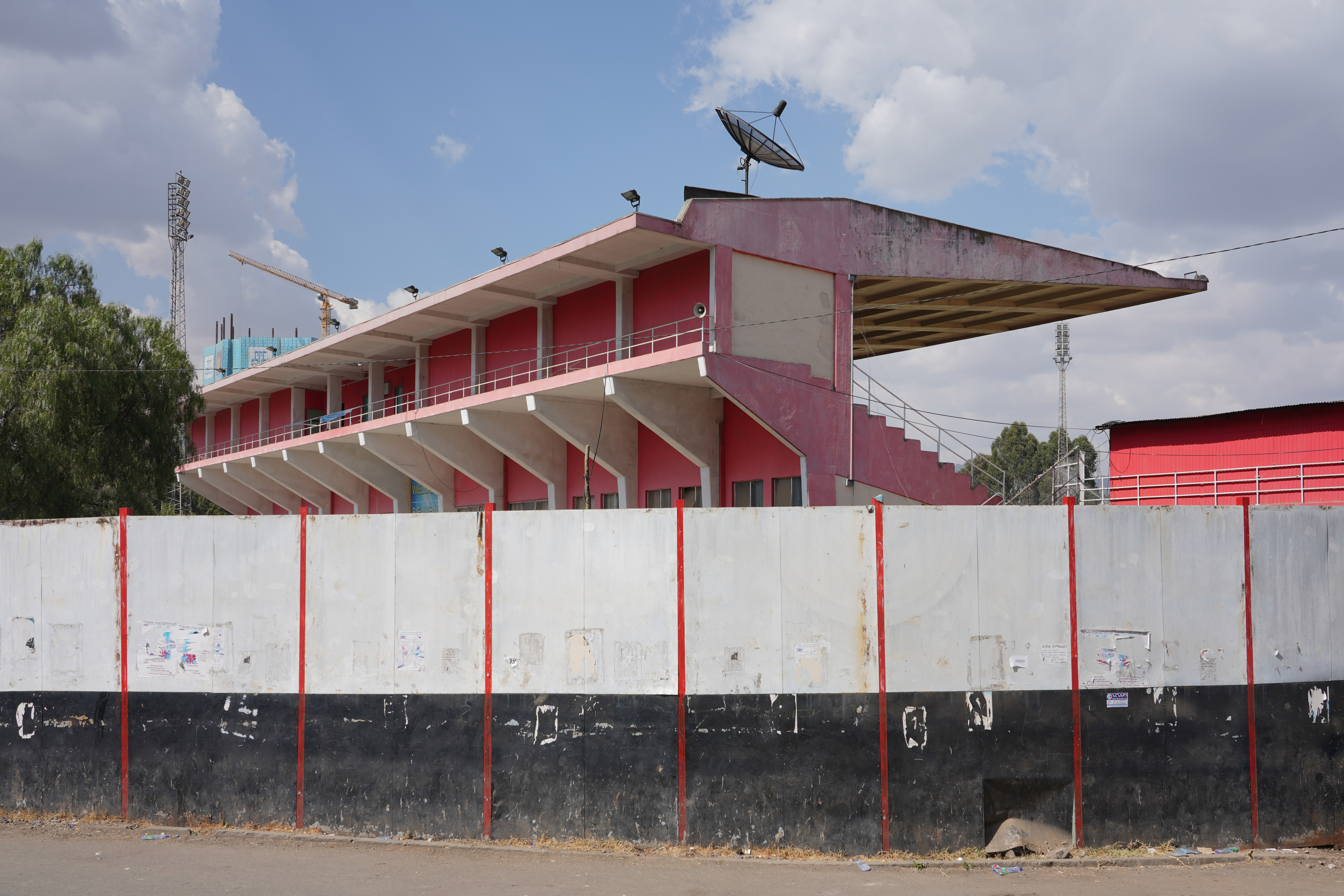
- Interactive map of Addis Ababa Stadium
- Full name: Yidnekachew Tessema Stadium
- Former names: Haile Selassie Stadium (1940–1974)
- Location: Addis Ababa, Ethiopia
- Capacity: 20,000
- Surface: Grass
- Record attendance: 60,000 (1962 African Cup of Nations Final, 21 January 1962)
- Field size: 105 m × 68 m

Construction
- Opened: 1940
- Renovated: 1960, 1999, 2021–2024

Tenants
- Saint George SC (1940–present); Defence Force SC (1940–present); Ethiopian Coffee SC (1976–present); Ethiopia national football team (selected matches)

Addis Ababa Stadium (Amharic: አዲስ አበባ ስታዲየም) is a multi-purpose stadium in Addis Ababa, Ethiopia. It is used mostly for football matches although it also has athletics facilities. The stadium has a capacity of 20,000 people.

== History ==
Addis Ababa Stadium was constructed in 1940 in the Italian ruled Addis Ababa, with the name "Stadio Littorio". It hosted several matches during the 1962, 1968 and 1976 African Cup of Nations, including the final of the 1962 (won by Ethiopia over the United Arab Republic) and 1968 editions and the final group stage of the 1976 tournament.

In 1999, the stadium was renovated for the 2001 CAF African Youth Championship held in Ethiopia. In this championship, the Ethiopia's National Youth team came fourth. The Ethiopian youth team thereby qualified for the first time for the 2001 FIFA World Youth Championship that took place in Argentina.

Addis Ababa Stadium is located at the heart of Addis Ababa near Legehar train station and Meskel Square. The stadium hosts both international soccer and athletics competitions. Great athletes like the legendary Abebe Bikila and Haile Gebrselassie have competed at the stadium. According to IAAF certification, Addis Ababa stadium has Class II certificate for its athletics facilities. Between 30 April and 4 May 2008, Addis Ababa Stadium hosted the 16th African Athletics Championships.

=== Stands ===
The small section immediately to the right of the main stand was called "Kemeneshe" while the stand in the right corner of the stadium was called "Abebe Bikila" because there was a shop with the same name under the stands on the exterior side.

The stands to the left of the main stand were called "Fasika Ber", named after advertisements, displayed in this section of the stadium. The section immediately to the left of this was called "Tesera".

The stands opposite of the main stand is historically known as "Katanga", alluding to the military personnel that used to sit in these stands after returning from peace keeping missions in Katanga, Democratic Republic of the Congo.

The stadium has 12 entrance tunnels.

== Future ==
=== Renovations ===
In January 2021, the sport commission of the stadium signed an agreement for design, consultation and management of renovations to the stadium.

=== New Stadium ===
Construction on a new FIFA and Olympic-standard 62,000 seat stadium is due in 2027. LAVA, DESIGNSPORT and local Ethiopian firm JDAW won the international competition held by the Federal Sport Commission, Ethiopia to design the stadium and sports village. The design combines local identity, such as rock cut architecture and the massob basket, with new technology. The stadium is being built by the China State Construction Engineering Corporation.
