= Yidnekatchew Tessema =

Ethiopian footballer

- ይድነቃቸው ተሠማ

4th President of CAF
- In office 1972–1987
- Preceded by: Abdel Halim Muhammad
- Succeeded by: Abdel Halim Muhammad (acting); Issa Hayatou

Personal details
- Born: Yidnekatchew Tessema Eshete; 11 September 1921 Jimma, Ethiopian Empire
- Died: 19 August 1987 (aged 65) Addis Ababa, Ethiopia
Association football career
- Position: Striker
Youth career
- 1935–1942: Saint-George SA
Senior career*
Years	Team	Apps	(Gls)
1943–1958	Saint-George SA	365	(318)
International career
1947–1957	Ethiopia	15	(3)
Managerial career
- 1962–1963: Ethiopia
- * Club domestic league appearances and goals

Yidnekatchew Tessema (Amharic: ይድነቃቸው ተሠማ; 11 September 1921 – 19 August 1987) was an Ethiopian professional footballer who played as a striker.

== Football career ==
He played for his school for five years, for the first Ethiopian football team, the Saint George for 27 years. He played 27 times in international competitions. During the racially segregated footballing of the Italian occupation of Ethiopia, Yidnekatchew translated the rules of football into Amharic language for the Native Sports Office. The year following the end of the occupation, Yidnekatchew led the establishment of an official sports federation.

Tessema was a founding member of the Confederation of African Football (CAF) in the late 1950s. He served CAF as the deputy president between 1964 and 1972 and as the President between 1972 and 1987. He was also member of the African Sport Congress, International Olympic Committee, FIFA and President of the African Olympics Committee.
