= 1962 African Cup of Nations =

3rd edition of the Africa Cup of Nations

Coordinates: 9°00′48″N 38°45′23″E

1962 የአፍሪካ ዋንጫ

Tournament details
- Host country: Ethiopia
- Dates: 14–21 January
- Teams: 4
- Venue: 1 (in 1 host city)

Final positions
- Champions: Ethiopia (1st title)
- Runners-up: United Arab Republic
- Third place: Tunisia
- Fourth place: Uganda

Tournament statistics
- Matches played: 4
- Goals scored: 18 (4.5 per match)
- Top scorer(s): (United Arab Republic) Badawi Abdel Fattah (Ethiopia) Luciano Vassallo (3 goals each)
- Best player: (Ethiopia) Mengistu Worku

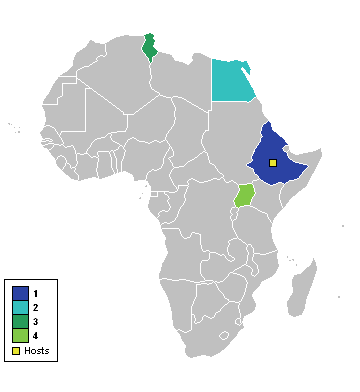
Participating nations

The 1962 African Cup of Nations was the third edition of the African Cup of Nations, the international football championship run by the Confederation of African Football (CAF). It was hosted by Ethiopia.

Nine countries entered the competition, including the reigning champions United Arab Republic (UAR), meaning for the first time a qualification tournament was required. The finals only included four teams. UAR, as holders, and Ethiopia, as hosts, qualified automatically, meaning each needed to play only one match to reach the final. Ethiopia won the tournament for the first time, defeating the UAR 4–2 after extra time in the final.

This tournament has to date the highest goals-per-game average in Africa Cup of Nations history.

== Qualified teams ==
This page details the process of qualifying for the 1962 African Cup of Nations.

Nine nations initially entered the competition, with Ethiopia and UAR both automatically qualified as hosts and title holders respectively. Sudan withdrew before the draw, and Morocco withdrew before play began, thus leaving five teams vying for the remaining two spots in the finals. This was the first time Sudan did not compete in the tournament.

Team	Qualified as	Qualified on	Previous appearances in tournament (Note: Bold indicates champion for that year, Italic indicates host.)
Ethiopia	Hosts		2 (1957, 1959)
United Arab Republic	Holders	29 May 1959	2 (**1957**, **1959**)
Uganda	2nd round winners	29 October 1961	0 (debut)
Tunisia	2nd round winners	10 December 1961	0 (debut)

== Venues ==
Addis Ababa
Hailé Sélassié Stadium
Capacity: **30,000**

== Final tournament ==
=== Bracket ===
Semi-finals
14 January – Addis Ababa
**Ethiopia**	**4**
Tunisia	2
18 January – Addis Ababa
**United Arab Rep.**	**2**
Uganda	1

Final
21 January – Addis Ababa
**Ethiopia (a.e.t.)**	**4**
United Arab Rep.	2
Third place
20 January – Addis Ababa
**Tunisia**	**3**
Uganda	0

=== Semi-finals ===
14 January 1962

Ethiopia	4–2	Tunisia
L. Vassallo 32' (pen.), 75'; Zeleke 36'; Worku 69'		Merrichkou 13'; Chérif 29'

Hailé Sélassié Stadium, Addis Ababa
Attendance: 30,000
Referee: Wilson Brooks (Uganda)

18 January 1962

United Arab Republic	2–1	Uganda
Badawi 50'; Selim 57'		Bunyenyezi 16'

Hailé Sélassié Stadium, Addis Ababa
Referee: Mustapha Belhouas (Tunisia)

=== Third place match ===
20 January 1962

Tunisia	3–0	Uganda
Jedidi 3'; Laaouini 53'; Meddab 85'

Hailé Sélassié Stadium, Addis Ababa
Referee: Isaac Lugonzo (Kenya)

=== Final ===
21 January 1962

Ethiopia	4–2 (a.e.t.)	United Arab Republic
Kidane 74'; L. Vassallo 84' (Note: Mengistu Worku was initially credited with scoring twice in the final, but later, one of his goals in the 84th minute was attributed to Luciano Vassallo.); I. Vassallo 101'; Worku 118'		Badawi 35', 75'

Hailé Sélassié Stadium, Addis Ababa
Attendance: 30,000
Referee: Wilson Brooks (Uganda)

== Goalscorers ==
There were 18 goals scored in 4 matches, for an average of 4.5 goals per match.

3 goals

- (United Arab Republic) Badawi Abdel Fattah
- (Ethiopia) Luciano Vassallo

2 goals

- (Ethiopia) Mengistu Worku

1 goal

- (Ethiopia) Tekle Kidane
- (Ethiopia) Italo Vassallo
- (Ethiopia) Girma Zeleke
- (Tunisia) Moncef Chérif
- (Tunisia) Mohamed Salah Jedidi
- (Tunisia) Chedly Laaouini
- (Tunisia) Rachid Meddeb
- (Tunisia) Ammar Merrichkou
- (Uganda) John Bunyenyezi
- (United Arab Republic) Saleh Selim
