= Africa Cup of Nations =

Football tournament

- Organiser(s): CAF
- Founded: 1957; 69 years ago
- Region: Africa
- Teams: 24 (finals); 54 (eligible to enter qualification)
- Current champions: Morocco (2nd title)
- Most championships: Egypt (7 titles)
- Website: CAFonline.com
- 2027 Africa Cup of Nations

The Africa Cup of Nations, commonly abbreviated as AFCON in English and CAN (from Coupe d'Afrique des Nations) in French, and currently known as the TotalEnergies Africa Cup of Nations for sponsorship reasons, is the main biennial international men's association football competition in Africa. It is sanctioned by the Confederation of African Football (CAF) and was first held in 1957. Since 1968, it has been held every two years, switching to odd-numbered years (Note: The 2021 tournament was held in 2022 but retained the name for sponsorship reasons. The 2023 tournament was held in 2024 but retained the name for sponsorship reasons.) in 2013. The competition is expected to revert to even-numbered years and become a quadrennial event, with initial plans for it to take place in leap years from 2028; however this is currently on hold.

In the first tournament in 1957, there were only three participating nations: Sudan, Egypt and Ethiopia. South Africa was originally scheduled to join, but was disqualified due to the apartheid policies of the government then in power. Since then, the tournament has expanded greatly, making it necessary to hold a qualifying tournament. The number of participants in the final tournament reached 16 in 1998 (16 teams were to compete in 1996, but Nigeria withdrew, reducing the field to 15, and the same happened with Togo's withdrawal in 2010), and until 2017, the format was unchanged, with the 16 teams being drawn into four groups of four teams each, with the top two teams of each group advancing to a knock-out stage. From 2019, the tournament was expanded from 16 to 24 teams.

Egypt is the most successful nation in the cup's history, winning the tournament seven times, with Cameroon winning five times and Ghana four times. A total of fifteen countries have won the cup in the tournament's history. Three trophies have been awarded during the tournament's history; the current trophy was first awarded in 2002. Egypt won an unprecedented three consecutive titles in 2006, 2008, and 2010. In 2013, the tournament format was switched to being held in odd-numbered years so as not to interfere with the FIFA World Cup.

== History ==
=== 1950s–60s: Origin and early years ===
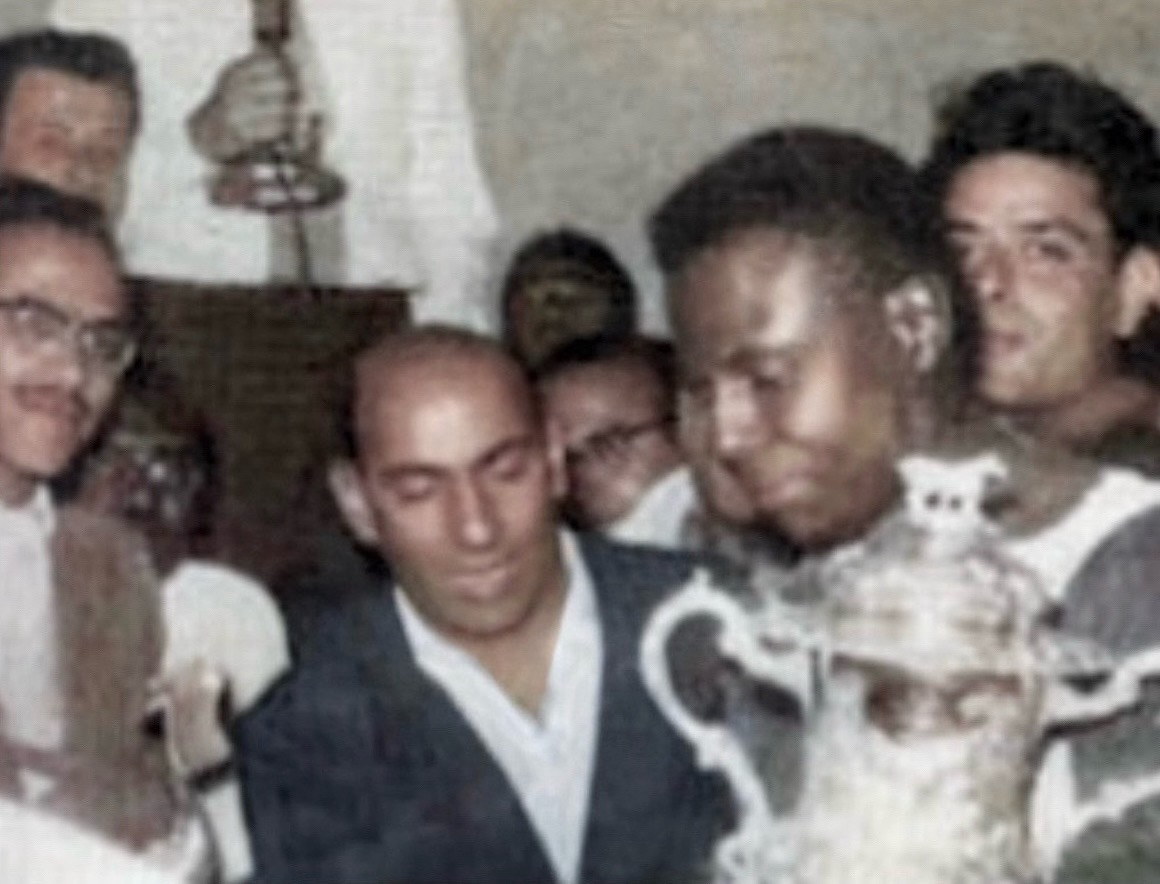
Egypt's captain Hanafy Bastan holding the first African Cup of Nations trophy in 1957.

The origin of the African Nations Cup dates from June 1956, when the creation of the Confederation of African Football was proposed during the third FIFA congress in Lisbon. There were immediate plans for a continental tournament to be held and, in February 1957, the first Africa Cup of Nations was held in Khartoum, Sudan. There was no qualification for this tournament, the field being made up of the four founding nations of CAF (Egypt, Sudan, Ethiopia, and South Africa). South Africa's insistence on selecting only white players for its squad due to its apartheid policy led to its disqualification, and as a consequence Ethiopia were handed a bye straight to the final. Hence only two matches were played, with Egypt being crowned as the first continental champion after defeating hosts Sudan in the semi-final by 2–1 and Ethiopia in the final by a score of 4–0.

Two years later in 1959, Egypt hosted the second ANC in Cairo with the participation of the same three teams. Host and defending champions Egypt again won, after defeating Sudan in the final by a score of 2–1. The field grew to include nine teams for the third ANC in 1962 in Addis Ababa, and for the first time there was a qualification round to determine which four teams would play for the title. Host Ethiopia and reigning champion Egypt received automatic berths and were joined in the final four by Nigeria and Tunisia. Egypt made its third consecutive final appearance, but the Ethiopia team emerged as victors, first beating Tunisia and then downing Egypt in extra time.

=== 1960s: Ghanaian domination ===
In 1963, Ghana made its first appearance as it hosted the event and won the title after beating Sudan in the final. They repeated that as they became champions two years later in Tunisia—equalling Egypt as two-time winners—with a squad that included only two returning members from the 1963 team. In 1965, the CAF introduced a rule that limited the number of overseas players in each team to two. The rule persisted until 1982.

The 1968 competition's final tournament format expanded to include eight of the 22 teams entered in the preliminary rounds. The qualifying teams were distributed in two groups of four to play single round-robin tournaments, with the top two teams of each group advancing to semi-finals, a system that remained in use for the finals until 1992. The Democratic Republic of Congo won its first title, beating Ghana in the final. Starting with the 1968 tournament, the competition was regularly held every two years in even-numbered years; this ended with the 2012 tournament, which was followed by a tournament in 2013, and successor editions in each odd-numbered year. Ivory Coast forward Laurent Pokou led the 1968 and 1970 tournaments in scoring, with six and eight goals respectively, and his total of 14 goals remained the all-time record until 2008. Play was covered for television for the first time during the 1970 tournament in Sudan, as the hosts lifted the trophy after defeating Ghana – who were playing their fourth consecutive final.

=== 1970s: A decade of champions ===
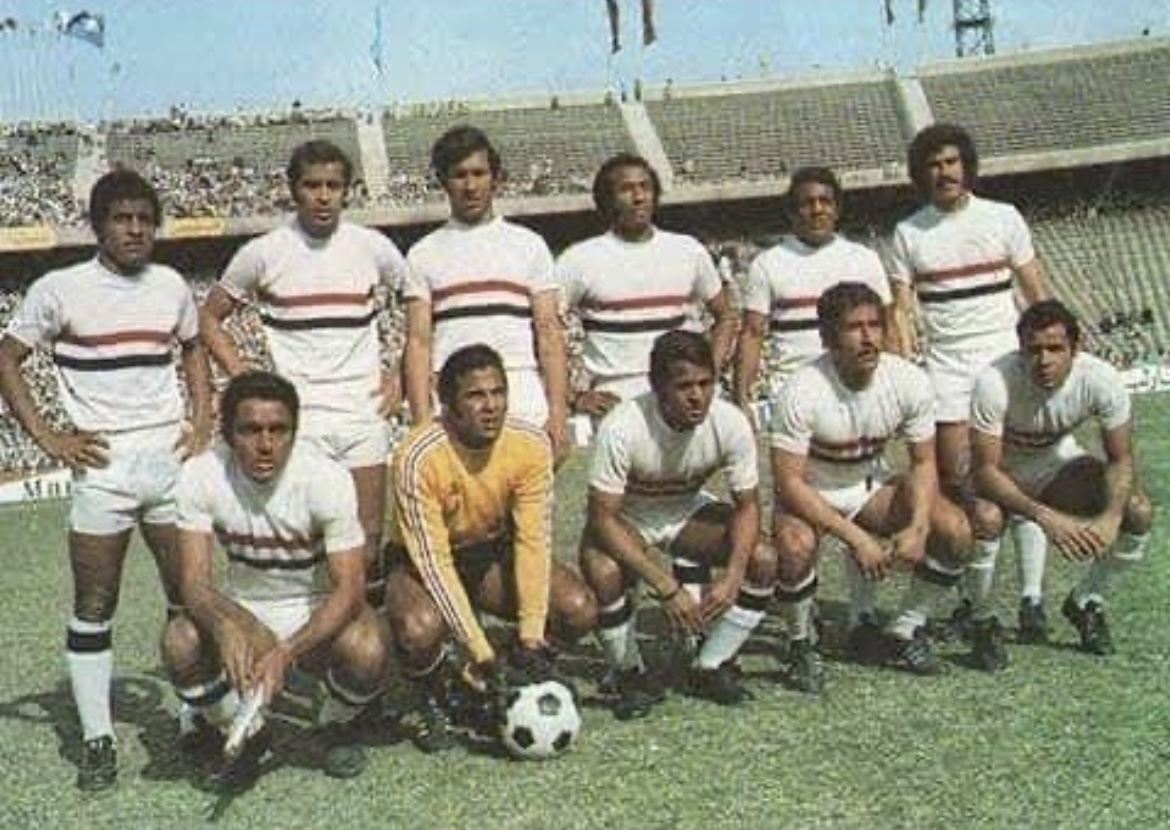
Egypt's starting lineup in the 1974 edition

Six nations won titles from 1970 to 1980: Sudan, Congo-Brazzaville, Zaire, Morocco, Ghana, and Nigeria. Zaire's second title in the 1974 edition (it won its first as the Democratic Republic of Congo) came after facing Zambia in the final.

For the only time to date in the history of the competition, the match had to be replayed as the first contest between the two sides ended in a 2–2 draw after extra time. The final was re-staged two days later with Zaire winning 2–0. Forward Mulamba Ndaye scored all four of Zaire's goals in these two matches: he was also the top scorer of the tournament with nine goals, setting a single-tournament record that remains unmatched. Three months earlier, Zaire had become the first Sub-Saharan African nation to qualify to the FIFA World Cup. Morocco won their first title in the 1976 ANC held in Ethiopia and Ghana took its third championship in 1978, becoming the first nation to win three titles.

=== 1980s: Cameroonian domination ===
Between 1980 and 1990, Cameroon managed to reach the final of the Africa Cup three times in a row, winning the competition twice in 1984 and 1988 and losing once on penalties against Egypt in the 1986 edition, the other dominant team during this period was Algeria, along with their solid 1982 and decent 1986 World Cup appearances, the North African nation lost in the final against hosts Nigeria in the 1980 tournament allowing the Super Eagles to capture their first championship. After the 1980 edition, Algeria reached the semi-finals of every edition except the 1986 cup until they eventually won the competition in 1990. Ghana's fourth continental title came in the 1982 cup tournament, where they beat host Libya in the final. The match ended in a 1–1 draw after 120 minutes and Ghana national football team won the penalty shootout to become champions.

=== 1990s: The return of South Africa ===
In 1990, the 1990 African Cup of Nations was the 17th edition of the Africa Cup of Nations, the football championship of Africa (CAF). It was hosted by Algeria. Just like in 1988, the field of eight teams was split into two groups of four. Algeria won its first championship, beating Nigeria in the final 1–0. Nigeria lost once again as they made their third final appearance in four tournaments, this time falling to host Algeria.

The 1992 Cup of Nations expanded the number of final tournament participants to 12; the teams were divided into four groups of three, with the top two teams of each group advancing to quarter-finals. Ghanaian midfielder Abedi "Pele" Ayew, who scored three goals, was named the best player of the tournament after his contributions helped Ghana reach the final; he was, however, suspended for that match and Ghana lost to Ivory Coast in a penalty shootout that saw each side make 11 attempts to determine the winner. Ivory Coast set a record for the competition by holding each of their opponents scoreless in the six matches of the final tournament.

The 12-team, three-group format was used again two years later, where hosts Tunisia were humiliated by their first-round elimination. Nigeria, who had just qualified to the World Cup for the first time in their history, won the tournament, beating Zambia, who a year before had been struck by disaster when most of their national squad died in a plane crash while travelling to play a 1994 World Cup qualification match. Nigerian forward Rashidi Yekini, who had led the 1992 tournament with four goals, repeated as the top scorer with five goals.

South Africa hosted the 20th ACN competition in 1996, marking its first ever appearance after a decades-long ban was lifted with the end of apartheid in the country, which had been followed by a failed attempt to qualify in 1994. The number of final-round participants in 1996 was expanded to 16, split into four groups. However, the actual number of teams playing in the final was only 15, because Nigeria withdrew from the tournament at the final moment for political reasons. Bafana Bafana won their first title on home soil, defeating Tunisia in the final.

The South Africans would reach the final again two years later in Burkina Faso, but were unable to defend their title, losing to Egypt who claimed their fourth cup.

=== 2000s: Egypt's unprecedented treble ===
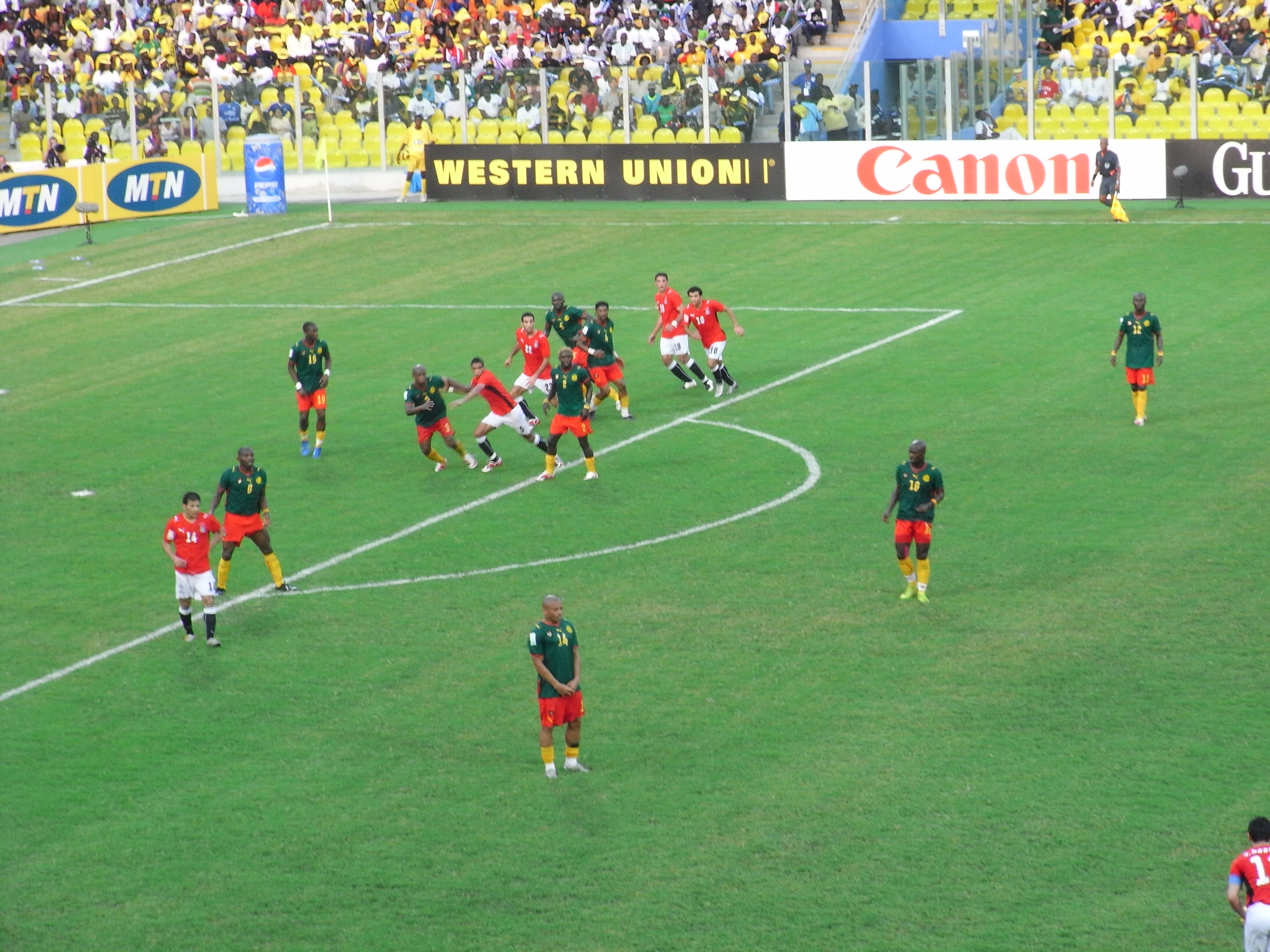
Egypt against Cameroon at the 2008 Africa Cup of Nations Final.

The 2000 edition was hosted jointly by Ghana and Nigeria, who replaced the originally designated host Zimbabwe. Following a 2–2 draw after extra time in the final, Cameroon defeated Nigeria on penalty kicks. In 2002, Cameroon's Indomitable Lions won their second consecutive title. This was the first repeat since Ghana had done it in the 1960s and after Egypt had done it before in 1957 and 1959. The Cameroonians beat first-time finalists Senegal, who also debuted in the World Cup later that year, via penalty kicks. Both finalists were eliminated in the quarter-finals two years later in Tunisia, where the hosts won their first title, beating Morocco 2–1 in the final.

The 2006 tournament was also won by the hosts, Egypt, who reached a continental-record fifth title. Ahead of the 2008 Africa Cup of Nations several European clubs called for a rethink of the tournament's schedule. Given that it takes place during the European season, players who are involved miss several matches for their clubs. In January 2008, FIFA president Sepp Blatter announced that he wanted the tournament to be held in either June or July by 2016, to fit in the international calendar, although this would preclude many countries in central and west Africa from hosting the competition (for these months occur during their wet season). The 2008 tournament was hosted by Ghana, and saw Egypt retain the trophy, winning its record-extending sixth tournament by defeating Cameroon 1–0 in the final.

=== 2010s: Switch to odd years ===
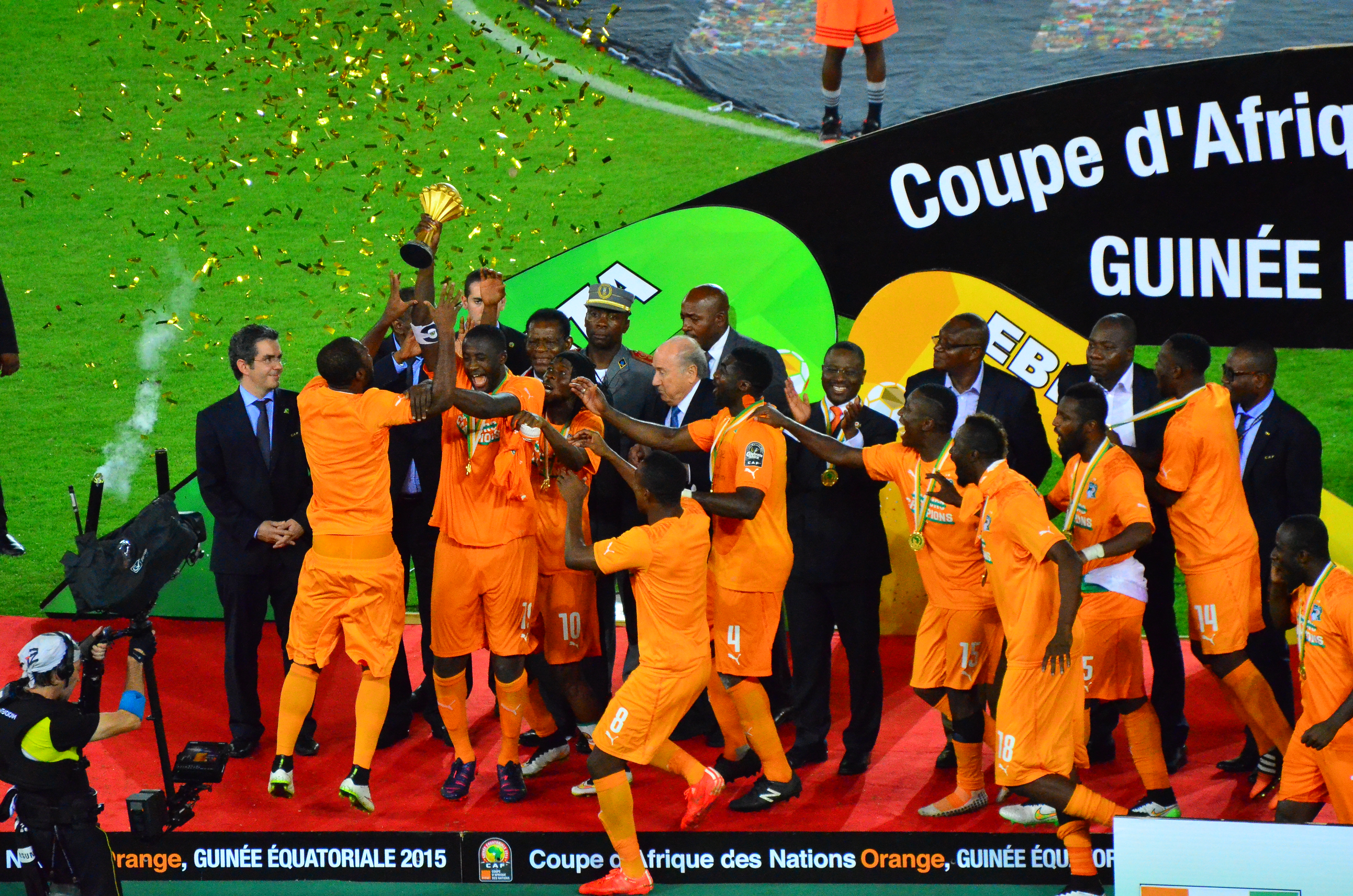
Ivory Coast players celebrate after winning the 2015 AFCON.

Egypt set a new record in the 2010 tournament (hosted by Angola) by winning its third consecutive title in an unprecedented achievement on the African level after defeating Ghana 1–0 in the final, retaining the gold-plated cup indefinitely and extending its record to seven continental titles (including when Egypt was known as UAR between 1958 and 1961). Egypt became the first African nation to win three consecutive cups and joined Mexico, Argentina, and Iran who also won their continent cup three times in a row. On 31 January 2010, Egypt set a new African record, not being defeated for 19 consecutive Cup of Nations matches, since a 2–1 loss against Algeria in Tunisia in 2004, and a record 9 consecutive win streak. In May 2010, it was announced that the tournament would be moved to odd-numbered years from 2013 in order to prevent the tournament from taking place in the same year as the World Cup. It also meant there were two tournaments within twelve months in January 2012 (co-hosted by Gabon and Equatorial Guinea) and January 2013 (hosted by South Africa). The change of FIFA Confederations Cup from a biennial to a quadrennial tournament, and the switching of the Africa Cup of Nations from even to odd-number years, meant that some previous Africa Cup of Nations champions such as Egypt, Zambia, and Ivory Coast (winners of the 2010, 2012, and 2015 tournaments respectively) were deprived from participating in the Confederations Cup tournament.

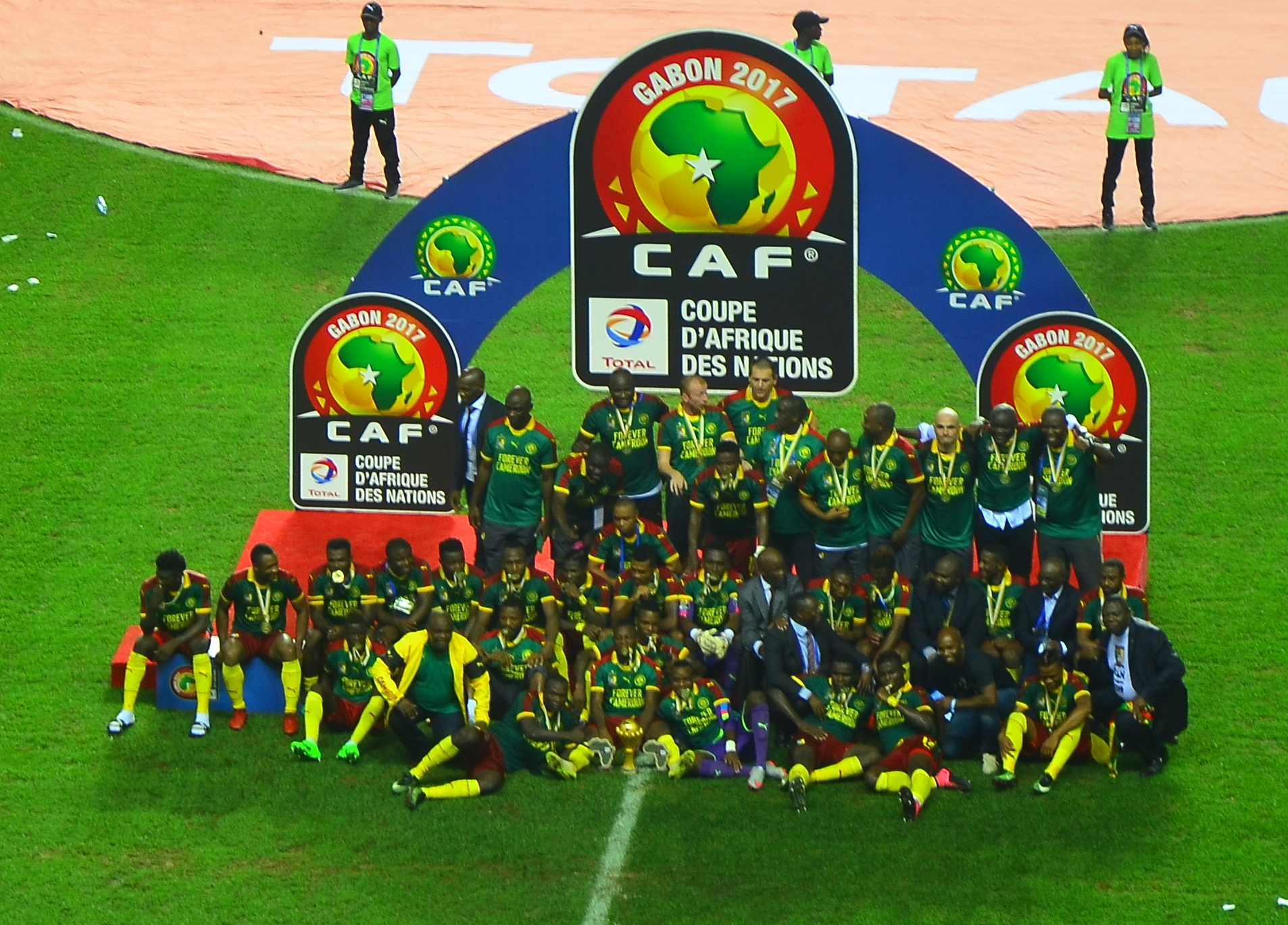
Cameroon players celebrate after winning the 2017 AFCON.

In 2011, Morocco won the bid to host the 2015 edition, and Libya won the right to host the 2013 tournament, but the 2011 Libyan civil war prompted Libya and South Africa to trade years, with South Africa hosting in 2013 and Libya hosting in 2017. Ongoing fighting in Libya ultimately prompted CAF to move the 2017 tournament to Gabon). In 2012, Zambia won the final after a penalty shootout against Ivory Coast. This drew increased media attention since the match took place in Gabon, only a few hundred meters from the crash site of the 1993 air disaster of their national team. The 2013 tournament was won by Nigeria, beating first time finalists Burkina Faso. In 2014–15, the West African Ebola virus epidemic disrupted the tournament. All football activities in Liberia were suspended, and the Antoinette Tubman Stadium in Monrovia was converted into an Ebola treatment unit. The 2015 Africa Cup of Nations was scheduled to be held in Morocco, but they refused to hold the tournament on the allotted dates due to concerns of the Ebola outbreak, so it was moved to Equatorial Guinea. In July 2016, Total secured the rights to an eight-year sponsorship package to support 10 of CAF's principal competitions. This began with the 2017 Africa Cup of Nations in Gabon which was renamed the "Total Africa Cup of Nations".

=== Since 2019: Tournament expansion and date change ===
In July 2017, under Ahmad Ahmad's presidency, two changes were approved: switching the timing of the competition from January to the Northern Hemisphere summer and expanding from 16 to 24 teams (effective from the 2019 Africa Cup of Nations).

Algeria won the African Cup of Nations 2019, defeating Senegal 1–0 in the final. The title was Algeria's second, and first since 1990. Nigeria came third after beating Tunisia 1–0 in their third-place decider match. The prize money awarded to the 2019 Africa Cup of Nations winner amounted to $4.5 million while runners-up Senegal got $2.5 million.

Match days 3 and 4 of the 2021 Africa Cup of Nations qualifiers, which was slated from 25 to 30 March 2020, were postponed due to the COVID-19 pandemic. The 2021 Africa Cup of Nations tournament, hosted by Cameroon, was postponed to 2022 due to the COVID-19 pandemic. The Confederation of African Football increased the cash prize for the winner from $4.5 million to $5 million for the 2021 Africa Cup of Nations while the second-best team would get $2.75 million. Senegal won the tournament for the first time after defeating Egypt on penalties in the final. In that tournament, Salima Mukansanga became the first woman to referee at the Africa Cup of Nations, leading an all-woman officiating team of Fatiha Jermoumi (Morocco), Carine Atemzabong (Cameroon), and Bouchra Karboubi (Morocco) as the VAR.

The 2023 edition of the Cup was held from January 2024, mainly due to the heat in host Ivory Coast.

The 2025 event, the 35th edition, was held in December 2025 and January 2026, with the timing due to the new quadrennial FIFA Club World Cup tournament. Prize money was increased from US$7 million in 2023 to US$10 million in 2025. Senegal beat host nation Morocco 1–0 in the final at Prince Moulay Abdellah Stadium in Rabat on 19 January 2026, but the result was overturned by the Confederation of African Football's appeal board on 17 March 2026 on the basis that the Senegal players stormed off the pitch to forfeit the match, despite play later continuing. The match outcome was officially changed to a 3–0 win to Morocco. Senegal has said it will appeal against the ruling. On 24 March 2026, for the first time CAS (Court of Arbitration) stated it was approached by the Senegalese Football Federation, appealing against the decision to strip them of their title. CAS Director General Matthieu Reeb said the appeal will be heard as swiftly as possible.

=== 2028: Proposed return to even-numbered years and change in frequency ===
On 20 December 2025, CAF announced that the tournament would return to even-numbered years and would become a quadrennial event starting with the 2028 edition. In addition, it was announced that an annual African Nations League would commence in 2029. However, on 29 October 2026, CAF announced that the tournament would continue to be a biennial event for the forseeable future, as the African Nations League would take "several years" to contribute enough both financially and competively to be self-maintaining. After the 2028 AFCON, the next two editions will be in 2031 and 2033 in order to prevent a conflict with the 2030 FIFA World Cup, which Morocco is co-hosting.

== Format ==
The number of teams and the format of each final tournament have varied over the years. In most tournaments, the tournament consists of a round-robin group stage followed by a single-elimination knockout stage.

Year	Teams	Matches		Format
Year	Teams	Min.	Act.	Format
1957	3	2		semi-final, final
1959	3	3		round-robin group of 3
1962	4	4		semi-finals, 3rd-place match, final
1963	6	8		2 groups of 3, 3rd-place match, final
1965	6	8		2 groups of 3, 3rd-place match, final
1968	8	16		2 groups of 4, semi-finals, 3rd-place match, final
1970	8	16		2 groups of 4, semi-finals, 3rd-place match, final
1972	8	16		2 groups of 4, semi-finals, 3rd-place match, final
1974	8	16	17	2 groups of 4, semi-finals, 3rd-place match, final
1976	8	18		2 groups of 4, final round-robin group of 4
1978	8	16		2 groups of 4, semi-finals, 3rd-place match, final
1980	8	16		2 groups of 4, semi-finals, 3rd-place match, final
1982	8	16		2 groups of 4, semi-finals, 3rd-place match, final
1984	8	16		2 groups of 4, semi-finals, 3rd-place match, final
1986	8	16		2 groups of 4, semi-finals, 3rd-place match, final
1988	8	16		2 groups of 4, semi-finals, 3rd-place match, final
1990	8	16		2 groups of 4, semi-finals, 3rd-place match, final
1992	12	20		4 groups of 3, quarter-finals, semi-finals, 3rd-place match, final
1994	12	20		4 groups of 3, quarter-finals, semi-finals, 3rd-place match, final
1996	15	29		4 groups of 3–4, quarter-finals, semi-finals, 3rd-place match, final
1998	16	32		4 groups of 4, quarter-finals, semi-finals, 3rd-place match, final
2000	16	32		4 groups of 4, quarter-finals, semi-finals, 3rd-place match, final
2002	16	32		4 groups of 4, quarter-finals, semi-finals, 3rd-place match, final
2004	16	32		4 groups of 4, quarter-finals, semi-finals, 3rd-place match, final
2006	16	32		4 groups of 4, quarter-finals, semi-finals, 3rd-place match, final
2008	16	32		4 groups of 4, quarter-finals, semi-finals, 3rd-place match, final
2010	15	29		4 groups of 3–4, quarter-finals, semi-finals, 3rd-place match, final
2012	16	32		4 groups of 4, quarter-finals, semi-finals, 3rd-place match, final
2013	16	32		4 groups of 4, quarter-finals, semi-finals, 3rd-place match, final
2015	16	32		4 groups of 4, quarter-finals, semi-finals, 3rd-place match, final
2017	16	32		4 groups of 4, quarter-finals, semi-finals, 3rd-place match, final
2019	24	52		6 groups of 4, round of 16, quarter-finals, semi-finals, 3rd-place match, final
2021	24	52		6 groups of 4, round of 16, quarter-finals, semi-finals, 3rd-place match, final
2023	24	52		6 groups of 4, round of 16, quarter-finals, semi-finals, 3rd-place match, final
2025	24	52		6 groups of 4, round of 16, quarter-finals, semi-finals, 3rd-place match, final
2027	24	52		6 groups of 4, round of 16, quarter-finals, semi-finals, 3rd-place match, final
2028				

Since the 1962 edition, this competition has been held in two phases: a qualification phase (or called the elimination phase) and a final tournament. The host country of the final tournament is automatically qualified, and in the first editions the defending champion was also qualified for the following tournament.

=== Qualifying ===
Map of countries by their number of titles

The qualification phase has evolved over time according to the increasing number of nations affiliated to the Confederation of African Football (CAF). It was set up from 1962, during the first two editions of the Africa Cup of Nations, the founding nations of the CAF participated in the final tournament, namely Egypt, Ethiopia and Sudan (South Africa was excluded just after its foundation due to Apartheid).

In 1962, new nations were affiliated and forced CAF to set up a qualifying phase for the final tournament in the form of knockout matches. This system was used until the 1992 edition, when the organization of the qualifying phase became closer to that of the UEFA European Championship, with qualifying groups of four to seven teams depending on the editions where each selection plays a round-trip opposition against each of its opponents, the qualified country being decided according to its classification within its group.

=== Final phase ===
Only the hosts received an automatic qualification spot, with the other 23 teams qualifying through a qualification tournament. At the finals, the 24 teams were drawn into six groups of four teams each. The teams in each group played a single round robin.

After the group stage, the top two teams and the four best third-placed teams advanced to the round of 16. The winners advanced to the quarter-finals. The winners of the quarter-finals advanced to the semi-finals. The losers of the semi-finals played in a third-place play-off, while winners of the semi-finals played in the final.

== Trophy and medals ==
Throughout the history of the Africa Cup of Nations, three trophies have been awarded to the winners of the competition. The original trophy, made of silver, was the Abdelaziz Abdallah Salem Trophy, named after the first CAF president, Egyptian Abdelaziz Abdallah Salem. As the first winner of three Africa Cup of Nations tournaments, Ghana obtained the right to permanently hold the trophy in 1978.

The second trophy was awarded from 1980 to 2000 and was named "Trophy of African Unity" or "African Unity Cup". It was given to CAF by the Supreme Council for Sports in Africa prior to the 1980 tournament and it was a cylindrical piece with the Olympic rings over a map of the continent engraved on it. It sat on a squared base and had stylized triangular handles. Cameroon won the Unity Cup indefinitely after they became three-time champions in 2000.

In 2001, the third trophy was revealed, a gold-plated cup designed and made in Italy. Cameroon, permanent holders of the previous trophy, were the first nation to be awarded the new trophy after they won the 2002 edition. Egypt won the gold-plated cup indefinitely after they became three-time champions in 2010. Unlike previous winners who would have then taken the trophy home, Egypt was presented with a special full-size replica that they were allowed to keep. The winner of each edition receives a replica whose dimensions are equal to that of the original trophy.

CAF give 30 gold medals to the winning team, 30 silver medals to the runners-up, 30 bronze medals to the team ranked third and 30 diplomas to the team ranked fourth in the final tournament.

== Results ==
Keys

- a.e.t.: after extra time
- p: penalty shoot-out
- awd: awarded result.
- TBD: to be determined.

Ed.	Year	Host	First place game			Third place game			Teams
Ed.	Year	Host	(gold) Champions	Score	(silver) Runners-up	(bronze) Third place	Score	Fourth place	Teams
1	1957	Sudan	Egypt	4–0	Ethiopia	Sudan	—	—	3 (Note: South Africa were disqualified due to the country's apartheid policies.)
2	1959	United Arab Republic	United Arab Republic	round-robin (Note: The United Arab Republic won 2–1 over Sudan in the decisive match to claim the title.)	Sudan	Ethiopia	—	—	3
3	1962	Ethiopia	Ethiopia	4–2 (a.e.t.)	United Arab Republic	Tunisia	3–0	Uganda	4
4	1963	Ghana	Ghana	3–0	Sudan	United Arab Republic	3–0	Ethiopia	6
5	1965	Tunisia	Ghana	3–2 (a.e.t.)	Tunisia	Ivory Coast	1–0	Senegal	6
6	1968	Ethiopia	Congo-Kinshasa	1–0	Ghana	Ivory Coast	1–0	Ethiopia	8
7	1970	Sudan	Sudan	1–0	Ghana	United Arab Republic	3–1	Ivory Coast	8
8	1972	Cameroon	PR Congo	3–2	Mali	Cameroon	5–2	Zaire	8
9	1974	Egypt	Zaire	2–2 (a.e.t.); 2–0 (replay)	Zambia	Egypt	4–0	PR Congo	8
10	1976	Ethiopia	Morocco	round-robin (Note: Morocco drew 1–1 with Guinea in the decisive match to claim the title.)	Guinea	Nigeria	round-robin (Note: Nigeria won 3–2 over Egypt in the decisive match to claim the third place.)	Egypt	8
11	1978	Ghana	Ghana	2–0	Uganda	Nigeria	2–0 (awd) (Note: The match was abandoned at 1–1 after the Tunisian team withdrew from the field in the 42nd minute in protest at the officiating. Nigeria were awarded a 2–0 walkover.)	Tunisia	8
12	1980	Nigeria	Nigeria	3–0	Algeria	Morocco	2–0	Egypt	8
13	1982	Libya	Ghana	1–1 (a.e.t.) (7–6 p)	Libya	Zambia	2–0	Algeria	8
14	1984	Ivory Coast	Cameroon	3–1	Nigeria	Algeria	3–1	Egypt	8
15	1986	Egypt	Egypt	0–0 (a.e.t.) (5–4 p)	Cameroon	Ivory Coast	3–2	Morocco	8
16	1988	Morocco	Cameroon	1–0	Nigeria	Algeria	1–1 (a.e.t.) (4–3 p)	Morocco	8
17	1990	Algeria	Algeria	1–0	Nigeria	Zambia	1–0	Senegal	8
18	1992	Senegal	Ivory Coast	0–0 (a.e.t.) (11–10 p)	Ghana	Nigeria	2–1	Cameroon	12
19	1994	Tunisia	Nigeria	2–1	Zambia	Ivory Coast	3–1	Mali	12
20	1996	South Africa	South Africa	2–0	Tunisia	Zambia	1–0	Ghana	15 (Note: Nigeria withdrew prior to the start of the finals amidst political tension between the country and the host South Africa. Guinea were offered the spot but declined it.)
21	1998	Burkina Faso	Egypt	2–0	South Africa	DR Congo	4–4 (a.e.t.) (4–1 p)	Burkina Faso	16
22	2000	Ghana; Nigeria	Cameroon	2–2 (a.e.t.) (4–3 p)	Nigeria	South Africa	2–2 (a.e.t.) (4–3 p)	Tunisia	16
23	2002	Mali	Cameroon	0–0 (a.e.t.) (3–2 p)	Senegal	Nigeria	1–0	Mali	16
24	2004	Tunisia	Tunisia	2–1	Morocco	Nigeria	3–1	Mali	16
25	2006	Egypt	Egypt	0–0 (a.e.t.) (4–2 p)	Ivory Coast	Nigeria	1–0	Senegal	16
26	2008	Ghana	Egypt	1–0	Cameroon	Ghana	4–2	Ivory Coast	16
27	2010	Angola	Egypt	1–0	Ghana	Nigeria	1–0	Algeria	15 (Note: Togo were formally disqualified for failing to fulfil their opening match, after they had withdrawn after a terrorist attack against their bus on their way to the tournament.)
28	2012	Equatorial Guinea; Gabon	Zambia	0–0 (a.e.t.) (8–7 p)	Ivory Coast	Mali	2–0	Ghana	16
29	2013	South Africa	Nigeria	1–0	Burkina Faso	Mali	3–1	Ghana	16
30	2015	Equatorial Guinea	Ivory Coast	0–0 (a.e.t.) (9–8 p)	Ghana	DR Congo	0–0 (4–2 p)	Equatorial Guinea	16
31	2017	Gabon	Cameroon	2–1	Egypt	Burkina Faso	1–0	Ghana	16
32	2019	Egypt	Algeria	1–0	Senegal	Nigeria	1–0	Tunisia	24
33	2021	Cameroon	Senegal	0–0 (a.e.t.) (4–2 p)	Egypt	Cameroon	3–3 (5–3 p)	Burkina Faso	24
34	2023	Ivory Coast	Ivory Coast	2–1	Nigeria	South Africa	0–0 (6–5 p)	DR Congo	24
35	2025	Morocco	Morocco	3–0 (awd.) (Note: The 2025 final originally finished 1–0 for Senegal after extra time. On 17 March 2026, the CAF Appeal Board ruled that Senegal had forfeited the match for temporarily refusing to play and leaving the pitch in protest of a refereeing decision. Pursuant to articles 82 and 84 of the competition regulations, the final was awarded as a 3–0 win for Morocco, thereby retroactively declaring them as 2025 Africa Cup of Nations champions and stripping Senegal of the title.)	Senegal	Nigeria	0–0 (4–2 p)	Egypt	24
36	2027	Kenya; Tanzania; Uganda	TBD			TBD			24
37	2028	TBD	TBD			TBD			24

== Summary ==
Team	Winners	Runners-up	Third place	Fourth place	Total
Egypt	7 (1957, 1959*^{1}, 1986*, 1998, 2006*, 2008, 2010)	3 (1962^{1}, 2017, 2021)	3 (1963^{1}, 1970^{1}, 1974*)	4 (1976, 1980, 1984, 2025)	17
Cameroon	5 (1984, 1988, 2000, 2002, 2017)	2 (1986, 2008)	2 (1972*, 2021*)	1 (1992)	10
Ghana	4 (1963*, 1965, 1978*, 1982)	5 (1968, 1970, 1992, 2010, 2015)	1 (2008*)	4 (1996, 2012, 2013, 2017)	14
Nigeria	3 (1980*, 1994, 2013)	5 (1984, 1988, 1990, 2000*, 2023)	9 (1976, 1978, 1992, 2002, 2004, 2006, 2010, 2019, 2025)	—	17
Ivory Coast	3 (1992, 2015, 2023*)	2 (2006, 2012)	4 (1965, 1968, 1986, 1994)	2 (1970, 2008)	11
Algeria	2 (1990*, 2019)	1 (1980)	2 (1984, 1988)	2 (1982, 2010)	7
Morocco	2 (1976, 2025*)	1 (2004)	1 (1980)	2 (1986, 1988*)	6
DR Congo	2 (1968^{2}, 1974^{3})	—	2 (1998, 2015)	2 (1972^{3}, 2023)	6
Senegal	1 (2021)	3 (2002, 2019, 2025)	—	3 (1965, 1990, 2006)	7
Zambia	1 (2012)	2 (1974, 1994)	3 (1982, 1990, 1996)	—	6
Tunisia	1 (2004*)	2 (1965*, 1996)	1 (1962)	3 (1978, 2000, 2019)	7
Sudan	1 (1970*)	2 (1959, 1963)	1 (1957*)	—	4
South Africa	1 (1996*)	1 (1998)	2 (2000, 2023)	—	4
Ethiopia	1 (1962*)	1 (1957)	1 (1959)	2 (1963, 1968*)	5
Congo	1 (1972)	—	—	1 (1974)	2
Mali	—	1 (1972)	2 (2012, 2013)	3 (1994, 2002*, 2004)	6
Burkina Faso	—	1 (2013)	1 (2017)	2 (1998*, 2021)	4
Uganda	—	1 (1978)	—	1 (1962)	2
Guinea	—	1 (1976)	—	—	1
Libya	—	1 (1982*)	—	—	1
Equatorial Guinea	—	—	—	1 (2015*)	1

* hosts
^{1} as United Arab Republic
^{2} as Congo-Kinshasa
^{3} as Zaire

== Awards ==
There are currently six post-tournament awards:

- the Best Player for most valuable player;
- the Top Goalscorer for most prolific goal scorer;
- the Best Goalkeeper for most outstanding goalkeeper;
- the Best Young Player for most outstanding young player;
- the Team of the Tournament for best combined team of players at the tournament;
- the Fair Play Award for the team with the best record of fair play.

== See also ==
- African Nations Championship
- Women's Africa Cup of Nations
- U-23 Africa Cup of Nations
- U-20 Africa Cup of Nations
- U-17 Africa Cup of Nations
- List of Africa Cup of Nations official mascots
- List of Africa Cup of Nations official match balls
- List of Africa Cup of Nations songs and anthems
- List of association football competitions
