= 2021 Africa Cup of Nations Group D =

Football tournament group stage

Group D of the 2021 Africa Cup of Nations took place from 11 to 19 January 2022. The group consisted of Egypt, Guinea-Bissau, Nigeria and Sudan.

Nigeria and Egypt as the top two teams advanced to the round of 16.

== Teams ==
Draw position	Team	Zone	Method of qualification	Date of qualification	Finals appearance	Last appearance	Previous best performance	FIFA Rankings	
Draw position	Team	Zone	Method of qualification	Date of qualification	Finals appearance	Last appearance	Previous best performance	May 2021 (Note: The rankings of May 2021 were used for seeding for the final draw.)	December 2021
D1	Egypt	UNAF	Group G winners	25 March 2021	25th	2019	Winners (1957, 1959, 1986, 1998, 2006, 2008, 2010)	46	45
D2	Nigeria	WAFU	Group L winners	27 March 2021	19th	2019	Winners (1980, 1994, 2013)	32	36
D3	Sudan	CECAFA	Group C runners-up	28 March 2021	9th	2012	Winners (1970)	123	125
D4	Guinea-Bissau	WAFU	Group I runners-up	30 March 2021	3rd	2019	Group stage (2017, 2019)	108	106

== Standings ==
Pos	Team	Pld	W	D	L	GF	GA	GD	Pts	Qualification
1	Nigeria	3	3	0	0	6	1	+5	9	Advance to knockout stage
2	Egypt	3	2	0	1	2	1	+1	6	Advance to knockout stage
3	Sudan	3	0	1	2	1	4	−3	1	
4	Guinea-Bissau	3	0	1	2	0	3	−3	1	

Source: CAF
Rules for classification: Group stage tiebreakers

== Matches ==
=== Nigeria vs Egypt ===
11 January 2022
17:00

Nigeria	1–0	Egypt
Iheanacho 30'	Report

Roumdé Adjia Stadium, Garoua
Referee: Bakary Gassama (Gambia)

Nigeria	Egypt

GK	1	Maduka Okoye
RB	2	Ola Aina
CB	5	William Troost-Ekong (c)
CB	22	Kenneth Omeruo	(substituted off) 79'
LB	12	Zaidu Sanusi
CM	10	Joe Aribo
CM	4	Wilfred Ndidi
RW	17	Samuel Chukwueze	(substituted off) 72'
LW	15	Moses Simon	(substituted off) 90+1'
CF	14	Kelechi Iheanacho	(substituted off) 80'
CF	19	Taiwo Awoniyi	(substituted off) 72'
Substitutions:
FW	24	Umar Sadiq	(substituted on) 72'
MF	13	Chidera Ejuke	(substituted on) 72'
DF	6	Semi Ajayi	(substituted on) 79'
MF	25	Kelechi Nwakali	(substituted on) 80'
MF	18	Alex Iwobi	(substituted on) 90+1'
Interim manager:
Augustine Eguavoen

GK	1	Mohamed El Shenawy
RB	25	Akram Tawfik	(substituted off) 12'
CB	6	Ahmed Hegazi
CB	15	Mahmoud Hamdy	(substituted off) 90'
LB	13	Ahmed Fatouh	(substituted off) 46'
CM	5	Hamdy Fathy
CM	17	Mohamed Elneny
RW	10	Mohamed Salah (c)
AM	7	Trézéguet	(substituted off) 58'
LW	22	Omar Marmoush
CF	14	Mostafa Mohamed	(substituted off) 58'
Substitutions:
DF	2	Mohamed Abdelmonem	(substituted on) 12'
DF	12	Ayman Ashraf	(substituted on) 46'
MF	21	Zizo	(substituted on) 58'
FW	11	Ramadan Sobhi	(substituted on) 58'
FW	9	Mohamed Sherif	(substituted on) 90'
Manager:
(Portugal) Carlos Queiroz

Man of the Match:
Kelechi Iheanacho (Nigeria)

Assistant referees:
Elvis Guy Noupue Nguegoue (Cameroon)
Arsenio Marengula (Mozambique)
Fourth official:
Sadok Selmi (Tunisia)
Video assistant referee:
Bamlak Tessema Weyesa (Ethiopia)
Assistant video assistant referee:
Zakhele Siwela (South Africa)

=== Sudan vs Guinea-Bissau ===
11 January 2022
20:00

Sudan	0–0	Guinea-Bissau
	Report

Roumdé Adjia Stadium, Garoua
Referee: Issa Sy (Senegal)

Sudan	Guinea-Bissau

GK	1	Ali Abu Eshrein
RB	12	Mustafa Alfadni
CB	5	Salah Nemer (c)	(yellow card) 15'
CB	6	Mustafa Karshoum
LB	17	Mazin Mohamedein	(yellow card) 50'
RM	11	Gumaa Abas		(substituted off) 90'
CM	21	Walieldin Khedr
CM	14	Mohamed Al Rashed
LM	9	Abdel Raouf
CF	15	Yasin Hamed		(substituted off) 67'
CF	10	Mohamed Abdelrahman
Substitutions:
FW	22	Al-Jezoli Nouh		(substituted on) 67'
MF	19	Dhiya Mahjoub		(substituted on) 90'
Manager:
Burhan Tia

GK	12	Maurice Gomis
RB	15	Jefferson Encada
CB	22	Opa Sanganté
CB	20	Sori Mané
LB	2	Fali Candé
CM	10	Pelé		(substituted off) 85'
CM	6	Bura Nogueira (c)
CM	16	Moreto Cassamá
RF	17	Mama Baldé		(substituted off) 73'
CF	19	Joseph Mendes	(yellow card) 13'	(substituted off) 73'
LF	18	Piqueti
Substitutions:
FW	9	Steve Ambri		(substituted on) 73'
FW	13	Frédéric Mendy		(substituted on) 73'
MF	5	Panutche Camará		(substituted on) 85'
Manager:
Baciro Candé

Man of the Match:
Ali Abu Eshrein (Sudan)

Assistant referees:
El Hadj Malick Samba (Senegal)
Mahamadou Yahaya (Niger)
Fourth official:
Maguette N'Diaye (Senegal)
Video assistant referee:
Lahlou Benbraham (Algeria)
Assistant video assistant referee:
Djibril Camara (Senegal)

=== Nigeria vs Sudan ===
15 January 2022
17:00

Nigeria	3–1	Sudan
Chukwueze 3'; Awoniyi 45'; Simon 46'	Report	Khedr 70' (pen.)

Roumdé Adjia Stadium, Garoua
Referee: Victor Gomes (South Africa)

Nigeria	Sudan

GK	1	Maduka Okoye
RB	2	Ola Aina	(yellow card) 69'
CB	5	William Troost-Ekong (c)
CB	22	Kenneth Omeruo
LB	12	Zaidu Sanusi
CM	10	Joe Aribo		(substituted off) 66'
CM	4	Wilfred Ndidi
RW	17	Samuel Chukwueze		(substituted off) 46'
LW	15	Moses Simon
CF	14	Kelechi Iheanacho		(substituted off) 65'
CF	19	Taiwo Awoniyi		(substituted off) 82'
Substitutions:
MF	18	Alex Iwobi		(substituted on) 46'
FW	7	Ahmed Musa		(substituted on) 65'
MF	25	Kelechi Nwakali		(substituted on) 66'
FW	24	Umar Sadiq		(substituted on) 82'
Interim manager:
Augustine Eguavoen

GK	1	Ali Abu Eshrein
RB	12	Mustafa Alfadni
CB	5	Salah Nemer (c)	(substituted off) 88'
CB	6	Mustafa Karshoum
LB	17	Mazin Mohamedein
CM	14	Mohamed Al Rashed
CM	21	Walieldin Khedr
RW	11	Gumaa Abas	(substituted off) 46'
AM	15	Yasin Hamed	(substituted off) 64'
LW	9	Abdel Raouf	(substituted off) 88'
CF	25	Musab Ahmed	(substituted off) 46'
Substitutions:
FW	22	Al-Jezoli Nouh	(substituted on) 46'
MF	19	Dhiya Mahjoub	(substituted on) 46'
FW	8	Muhamed Hasoun	(substituted on) 64'
MF	18	Sharif Omer	(substituted on) 88'
DF	2	Muhamed Kesra	(substituted on) 88'
Manager:
Burhan Tia

Man of the Match:
Moses Simon (Nigeria)

Assistant referees:
Zakhele Siwela (South Africa)
Jerson Emiliano dos Santos (Angola)
Fourth official:
Boubou Traore (Mali)
Video assistant referee:
Adil Zourak (Morocco)
Assistant video assistant referee:
Mustapha Akarkad (Morocco)

=== Guinea-Bissau vs Egypt ===
15 January 2022
20:00

Guinea-Bissau	0–1	Egypt
	Report	Salah 69'

Roumdé Adjia Stadium, Garoua
Referee: Pacifique Ndabihawenimana (Burundi)

Guinea-Bissau	Egypt

GK	1	Jonas Mendes (c)
RB	15	Jefferson Encada	(yellow card) 31'	(substituted off) 77'
CB	22	Opa Sanganté
CB	20	Sori Mané
LB	2	Fali Candé
CM	6	Bura Nogueira
CM	16	Moreto Cassamá	(yellow card) 86'
RW	9	Steve Ambri		(substituted off) 60'
AM	5	Panutche Camará		(substituted off) 88'
LW	18	Piqueti	(yellow card) 25'	(substituted off) 77'
CF	17	Mama Baldé
Substitutions:
FW	11	Jorginho		(substituted on) 60'
DF	3	Leonel Ucha		(substituted on) 77'
FW	13	Frédéric Mendy		(substituted on) 77'
FW	7	Mauro Rodrigues		(substituted on) 88'
Manager:
Baciro Candé

GK	1	Mohamed El Shenawy
RB	3	Omar Kamal
CB	6	Ahmed Hegazi
CB	15	Mahmoud Hamdy		(substituted off) 46'
LB	12	Ayman Ashraf
CM	17	Mohamed Elneny	(yellow card) 50'	(substituted off) 78'
CM	4	Amr El Solia
RW	10	Mohamed Salah (c)
AM	19	Abdallah El Said		(substituted off) 58'
LW	22	Omar Marmoush		(substituted off) 78'
CF	14	Mostafa Mohamed		(substituted off) 58'
Substitutions:
DF	2	Mohamed Abdelmonem		(substituted on) 46'
FW	7	Trézéguet		(substituted on) 58'
MF	21	Zizo		(substituted on) 58'
FW	9	Mohamed Sherif		(substituted on) 78'
MF	5	Hamdy Fathy		(substituted on) 78'
Manager:
(Portugal) Carlos Queiroz

Man of the Match:
Mohamed Salah (Egypt)

Assistant referees:
Soulaimane Amaldine (Comoros)
Lionel Andrianantenaina (Madagascar)
Fourth official:
Ahmad Heeralall (Mauritius)
Video assistant referee:
Mustapha Ghorbal (Algeria)
Assistant video assistant referee:
Abdelhak Etchiali (Algeria)

=== Guinea-Bissau vs Nigeria ===
19 January 2022
20:00

Guinea-Bissau	0–2	Nigeria
	Report	Sadiq 56'; Troost-Ekong 75'

Roumdé Adjia Stadium, Garoua
Referee: Peter Waweru (Kenya)

Guinea-Bissau	Nigeria

GK	12	Maurice Gomis
RB	15	Jefferson Encada
CB	22	Opa Sanganté
CB	20	Sori Mané
LB	2	Fali Candé
DM	6	Bura Nogueira (c)
RM	11	Jorginho	(substituted off) 70'
CM	5	Panutche Camará	(substituted off) 69'
CM	16	Moreto Cassamá	(substituted off) 78'
LM	18	Piqueti	(substituted off) 70'
CF	17	Mama Baldé	(substituted off) 88'
Substitutions:
MF	23	Alfa Semedo	(substituted on) 69'
FW	9	Steve Ambri	(substituted on) 70'
FW	13	Frédéric Mendy	(substituted on) 70'
DF	3	Leonel Ucha	(substituted on) 78'
FW	7	Mauro Rodrigues	(substituted on) 88'
Manager:
Baciro Candé

GK	23	Francis Uzoho
RB	21	Tyronne Ebuehi	(substituted off) 76'
CB	5	William Troost-Ekong (c)
CB	6	Semi Ajayi
LB	3	Jamilu Collins
CM	4	Wilfred Ndidi
CM	25	Kelechi Nwakali	(substituted off) 76'
RW	18	Alex Iwobi
LW	13	Chidera Ejuke	(substituted off) 57'
CF	14	Kelechi Iheanacho	(substituted off) 85'
CF	24	Umar Sadiq	(substituted off) 57'
Substitutions:
FW	15	Moses Simon	(substituted on) 57'
FW	28	Peter Olayinka	(substituted on) 57'
MF	8	Frank Onyeka	(substituted on) 76'
DF	26	Olisa Ndah	(substituted on) 76'
FW	11	Henry Onyekuru	(substituted on) 85'
Interim manager:
Augustine Eguavoen

Man of the Match:
William Troost-Ekong (Nigeria)

Assistant referees:
Gilbert Cheruiyot (Kenya)
Arsenio Marengula (Mozambique)
Fourth official:
Rédouane Jiyed (Morocco)
Video assistant referee:
Bakary Gassama (Gambia)
Assistant video assistant referee:
Samir Guezzaz (Morocco)

=== Egypt vs Sudan ===
19 January 2022
20:00

Egypt	1–0	Sudan
Abdelmonem 35'	Report

Ahmadou Ahidjo Stadium, Yaoundé
Referee: Joshua Bondo (Botswana)

Egypt	Sudan

GK	1	Mohamed El Shenawy
RB	3	Omar Kamal
CB	6	Ahmed Hegazi
CB	2	Mohamed Abdelmonem	(yellow card) 83'
LB	12	Ayman Ashraf
CM	17	Mohamed Elneny
CM	4	Amr El Solia		(substituted off) 85'
RW	10	Mohamed Salah (c)
AM	19	Abdallah El Said		(substituted off) 57'
LW	22	Omar Marmoush		(substituted off) 66'
CF	14	Mostafa Mohamed		(substituted off) 85'
Substitutions:
MF	21	Zizo		(substituted on) 57'
FW	7	Trézéguet		(substituted on) 66'
MF	5	Hamdy Fathy		(substituted on) 85'
FW	28	Marwan Hamdy		(substituted on) 85'
Manager:
(Portugal) Carlos Queiroz

GK	23	Mohamed Mustafa		(substituted off) 46'
RB	12	Mustafa Alfadni
CB	3	Elsadig Hassan	(yellow card) 38'
CB	6	Mustafa Karshoum
LB	17	Mazin Mohamedein
CM	14	Mohamed Al Rashed		(substituted off) 46'
CM	21	Walieldin Khedr
RW	8	Muhamed Hasoun		(substituted off) 46'
AM	19	Dhiya Mahjoub	(yellow card) 52'
LW	9	Abdel Raouf		(substituted off) 70'
CF	10	Mohamed Abdelrahman (c)
Substitutions:
MF	11	Gumaa Abas		(substituted on) 46'
GK	1	Ali Abu Eshrein		(substituted on) 46'
FW	15	Yasin Hamed		(substituted on) 46'
MF	18	Sharif Omer		(substituted on) 70'
Manager:
Burhan Tia

Man of the Match:
Ahmed Hegazi (Egypt)

Assistant referees:
Jerson Emiliano dos Santos (Angola)
James Fredrick Emile (Seychelles)
Fourth official:
Hélder Martins de Carvalho (Angola)
Video assistant referee:
Bamlak Tessema Weyesa (Ethiopia)
Assistant video assistant referee:
Bouchra Karboubi (Morocco)
