= Siddiq Manzul =

Sudanese footballer

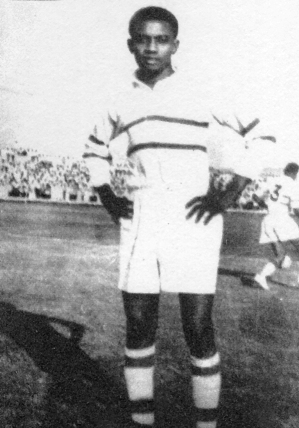
- Manzul at the 1959 African Cup of Nations

Personal information
- Full name: Siddiq Mohammed Manzul
- Date of birth: 1929
- Place of birth: Omdurman, Sudan
- Date of death: 11 April 2003 (aged 74)
- Place of death: Sudan
- Position: Forward

Youth career
- Al-Rabea Club

Senior career*
Years	Team	Apps	(Gls)
1944–1949	Al Hashmab Club		
1949–1963	Al-Hilal Club		

International career
1956–1962	Sudan		
Medal record
Men's football
Representing Sudan
Africa Cup of Nations
Runner-up	1959 United Arab Republic
Third place	1957 Sudan
- * Club domestic league appearances and goals

Siddiq Mohammed Manzul (Arabic: صديق محمد منزول) (1929 – 11 April 2003) was a Sudanese footballer who played with Al-Hilal Club. He participated in the first Africa Cup of Nations in 1957 and again in 1959.

== Honours ==
=== Club ===
Al-Hilal Club

- Khartoum League: 1953, 1955, 1958, 1959, 1960, 1961, 1963
- Sudan Cup: 1954

Sudan

- African Cup of Nations: runner-up, 1959; 3rd place, 1957

== International goals ==
#	Date	Venue	Opponent	Score	Result	Competition
1.	17 February 1957	Khartoum, Sudan	Egypt	3-4	Lost	Friendly
2.	8 March 1957	Khartoum, Sudan	Syria	1-0	Won	1958 FIFA World Cup qualification
3.	29 March 1959	Cairo, Egypt	Egypt	1-2	Lost	1959 Africa Cup of Nations
