= Mustafa Elfadni =

Sudanese footballer

Mustafa Alfadni
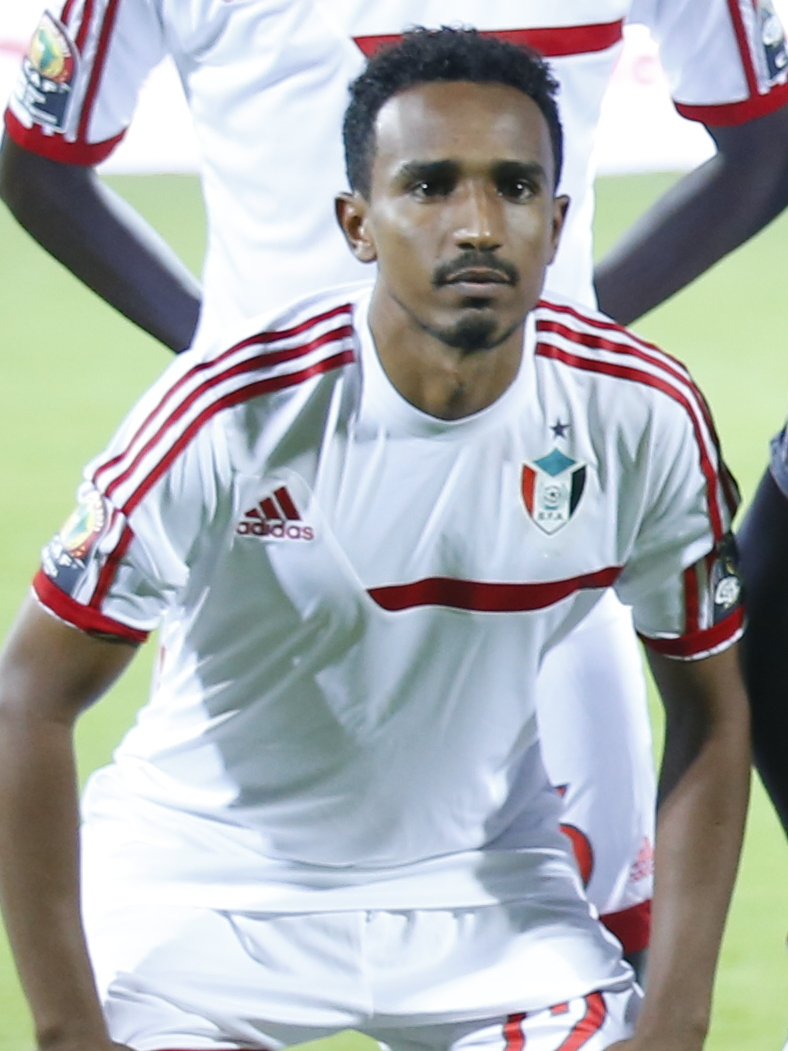
- Elfadni in January 2022

Personal information
- Full name: Mustafa Ahmed Saeed Alfadni
- Date of birth: 24 October 1999 (age 27)
- Position: Right back

Team information
- Current team: Al-Zamala SC
- Number: 20

Senior career*
Years	Team	Apps	(Gls)
2015–2018	Al-Hilal Omdurman		
2018–2021	Al Ahli Khartoum		
2021–2023	Al-Ahly Shendi		
2023–2024	Al Ahli Khartoum		
2024-2025	Al-Shomooa SC (Misrata)		
2025-	Al-Zamala SC		

International career^{‡}
2017	Sudan U20	2	(0)
2021–	Sudan	8	(0)
- * Club domestic league appearances and goals as of 22:55, 27 August 2025 (UTC) ‡ National team caps and goals as of 6:26, 28 April 2024 (UTC)

Mustafa Ahmed Saeed Alfadni (born 24 October 1999) is a Sudanese footballer who plays as a right midfielder for Al Ahli Khartoum and the Sudan national team. He played twice for the Sudan under-20 team at the 2017 Africa U-20 Cup of Nations, and was named in the Sudan squad for the 2021 Africa Cup of Nations.

== Honours ==
Al-Hilal Club

- Sudan Premier League: 2016, 2017
- Sudan Cup: 2016
