= Leonel Alves =

Leonel Alves may refer to:

- Leonel Alves (footballer, born 1988), Portuguese-born Bissau-Guinean footballer
- Leonel Alves (footballer, born 1993), Andorran footballer
- Leonel Alberto Alves (born 1957), member of the Legislative Assembly of Macau
