= Gumaa Abas =

Sudanese footballer

Personal information
- Full name: Gumaa Abas Omer
- Date of birth: 3 November 1994 (age 31)
- Place of birth: Sudan
- Height: 1.75 m (5 ft 9 in)
- Position: Midfielder

Team information
- Current team: Haidoub SC
- Number: 8

Senior career*
Years	Team	Apps	(Gls)
2016-2018	Hay Al-Arab SC		
2018-2021	Alamal SC Atbara		
2021-2022	Al-Hilal Club		
2022-	Haidoub SC		

International career^{‡}
2021–	Sudan	6	(0)
- * Club domestic league appearances and goals as of 11 January 2022 ‡ National team caps and goals as of 11 January 2022

Gumaa Abas Omer (Arabic: جمعة عباس عمر) (born 3 November 1994) is a Sudanese professional footballer who plays as a midfielder for Al-Hilal Omdurman and the Sudan national football team.
