= Mohamed Zurga =

Sudanese footballer (born 1998)

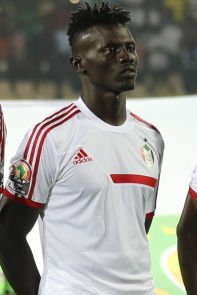
- Zurga with Sudan in 2022

Personal information
- Full name: Mohamed Abdallah Hossein
- Date of birth: 18 September 1998 (age 28)
- Place of birth: Khartoum, Sudan
- Height: 1.80 m (5 ft 11 in)
- Position: Striker

Team information
- Current team: Um Maghad SC
- Number: 8

Senior career*
Years	Team	Apps	(Gls)
2018–2020	Sebdu Aldein		
2020–2021	Al-Hilal Al-Fasher		
2021–2023	Al-Merrikh		
2023-2024	Al-Malakia FC		
2024	Al-Merreikh Bentiu		
2024-2025	Al-Nesour SC (Martouba)		
2025	Al-Watan SC		
2025-	Um Maghad SC		

International career^{‡}
2021–	Sudan	4	(0)
- * Club domestic league appearances and goals as of 22:22, 12 September 2025 (UTC) ‡ National team caps and goals as of 22:22, 20 January 2022 (UTC)

Mohamed Abdallah Hossein (Arabic: محمد عبد الله حسين; born 18 September 1998), known as Mohamed Zurga, is a Sudanese professional footballer who plays as a midfielder for the Sudanese club Al-Merrikh and the Sudan national team.

== International career ==
Born in Khartoum, Zurga made his international debut with the Sudan national team in a 3–2 friendly loss to Ethiopia on 30 December 2021. He was part of the Sudan squad that was called up for the 2021 Africa Cup of Nations.
