= Sharif Omer =

Sudanese footballer

Personal information
- Full name: Sharif Omar Abdalla Makki
- Date of birth: 19 June 1992 (age 34)
- Place of birth: Sudan
- Position: Forward

Team information
- Current team: Al-Quoz SC (Abu Hemed)
- Number: 18

Senior career*
Years	Team	Apps	(Gls)
2016–2022	Al-Hilal Al-Fasher		
2022-2024	Al-Ahli SC (Wad Madani)		
2024-2026	Al-Merrikh FC (Bantio)		
2026-	Al-Quoz SC (Abu Hemed)		

International career^{‡}
2021–2022	Sudan	6	(0)
- * Club domestic league appearances and goals as of 02:19, 24 August 2026 (UTC) ‡ National team caps and goals as of 02:19, 18 January 2022 (UTC)

Sharif Omer Abdalla Makki (Arabic: شريف عمر; born 9 June 1992), known as Sharif Omer, is a Sudanese professional footballer who plays as a midfielder for the Sudanese club Al-Ahli SC (Wad Madani), and the Sudan national team.

== International career ==
Omer made his international debut with the Sudan national team in a 3–2 friendly loss to Ethiopia on 30 December 2021. He was part of the Sudan squad that was called up for the 2021 Africa Cup of Nations.
