= Walieldin Khedr =

Sudanese footballer

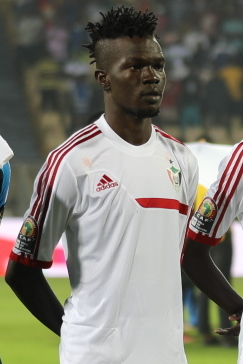
- Khedr with Sudan in 2022

Personal information
- Full name: Walieldin Khedr Safour Daiyeen
- Date of birth: 15 September 1995 (age 31)
- Place of birth: Khartoum, Sudan
- Height: 1.77 m (5 ft 10 in)
- Position: Midfielder

Team information
- Current team: Al-Hilal SC
- Number: 21

Senior career*
Years	Team	Apps	(Gls)
2014–2015	Al-Nil SC (Shendi)		
2016–2020	Al-Ahly Shendi		
2020–	Al-Hilal SC		

International career^{‡}
2016–	Sudan	60	(3)
- * Club domestic league appearances and goals as of 11 October 2021 ‡ National team caps and goals as of 12 November 2026

Walieldin Khedr Safour Daiyeen (Arabic: ولي الدين خضر صافور الضعين; born 15 September 1995) is a Sudanese professional footballer who plays as a midfielder for Al-Hilal SC and the Sudan national football team.

== International goals ==
No.	Date	Venue	Opponent	Score	Result	Competition
1	15 January 2022	Roumdé Adjia Stadium, Garoua, Cameroon	Nigeria	1–3	1–3	2021 Africa Cup of Nations
2	11 June 2024	Juba Stadium, Juba, South Sudan	South Sudan	1–0	3–0	2026 FIFA World Cup qualification
3	12 August 2025	Aman Stadium, Tanzania	Nigeria	2-0	4-0	2024 African Nations Championship
