= Mohamed Al Rasheed =

Sudanese footballer

Muhamed Alrasheed
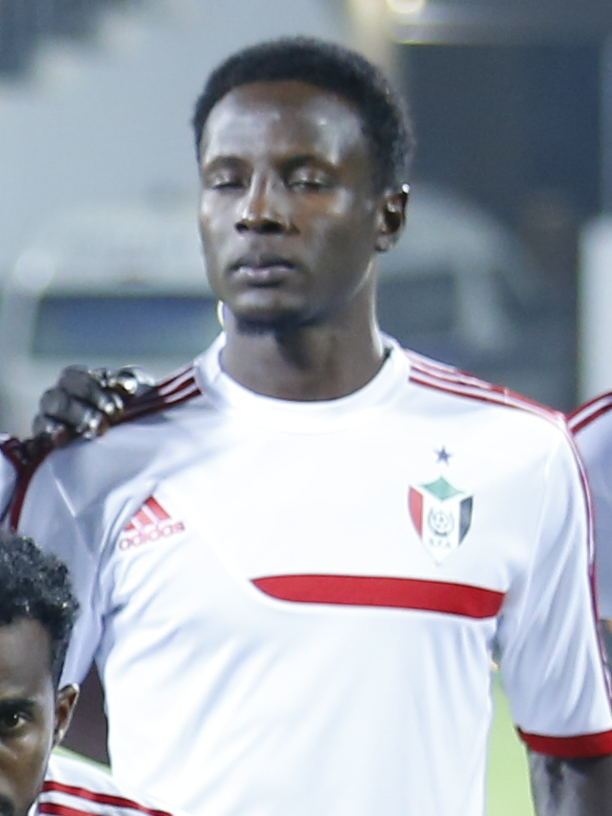
- Al Rashed with Sudan in 2022

Personal information
- Full name: Muhamed Alrasheed Mahamoud Shambaly
- Date of birth: 1 January 1994 (age 32)
- Place of birth: Sudan
- Height: 1.70 m (5 ft 7 in)
- Position: Midfielder

Team information
- Current team: Al-Merrikh
- Number: 7

Senior career*
Years	Team	Apps	(Gls)
2012–2014	Al-Nil		
2015–2016	Al-Ahli Atbara		
2016–	Al-Merrikh		

International career^{‡}
2019–	Sudan	38	(1)
- * Club domestic league appearances and goals as of 11 October 2021 ‡ National team caps and goals as of 14 November 2025

Muhamed Alrasheed Mahamoud Shambaly (born 1 January 1994) is a Sudanese professional footballer who plays as a midfielder for Al-Merrikh and the Sudan national football team.
