= Burhan Tia =

Sudanese football manager

Personal information
- Date of birth: 1965 (age 60–61)
- Place of birth: Sudan

Managerial career
- Years: Team
- Al-Mourada
- Al Ahli
- Al-Merreikh Al-Thagher
- Hay Al-Arab
- Alamal Atbara
- 2009: Al-Mourada
- 2009–2010: Al Neel
- Al-Hilal
- Al-Merreikh Al-Fasher
- Al-Hilal Al-Fasher
- Al-Merrikh
- Al-Tuti
- 2021–2023: Sudan

Burhan Tia (Arabic: برهان تية; born 1965) is a Sudanese football manager who last coached Sudan national team.

== Managerial career ==
In 1995, Tia entered management, taking charge of Al-Mourada, guiding the team to continental qualification. Tia later managed Khartoum-based club Al Ahli, Al-Merreikh Al-Thagher, Hay Al-Arab, Alamal Atbara, Kadougli-based club Al-Hilal, Al-Merreikh Al-Fasher, Al-Hilal Al-Fasher, Al Neel, Al-Merrikh and Al-Tuti.

In December 2021, Tia was appointed as the Sudan national football team's manager for the 2021 Africa Cup of Nations, replacing Hubert Velud.
