= Sudan Cup =

- (Sudan)
- Founded: 1951
- Region: Sudan
- Current champions: Al-Hilal Club (2024–25)
- Most championships: Al-Merrikh (19 titles)

The Sudan Cup is the top knockout tournament of the Sudanese football. It was created in 1990.

== Preliminaries ==
Begins 1t August/ Ends 31 May

- Round 32 ( Sudan Premier League Clubs and National League 1 Clubs)
- Round 16
- Quarter-Finals
- Semi-finals
- Finalist

== Winners ==
No	Year	Winners	Score	Runners-up	Venu
1	1951	Al-Merrikh SC	Cancelled	Al-Tahrir SC (Bahri)	Atbara Stadium, Atbara
2	1952	Al Neel SC (Khartoum)			
3	1953	Al-Mourada SC	0-0	Al Ahli SC (Wad Madani)	Omdurman Stadium, Omdurman
4	1954	Al-Hilal SC	5-0	Al Ahli SC (Wad Madani)	Omdurman Stadium, Omdurman
5	1955	Al-Merrikh SC	1-0	Al-Hilal SC	Omdurman Stadium, Omdurman
6	1956	Al Neel SC (Khartoum)	0-0	Al-Rabita SC (Wad Madani)	Omdurman Stadium, Omdurman
7	1957	Al Neel SC (Khartoum)			
8	1958	Al Neel SC (Khartoum)	0-0	Al Ahli SC (Khartoum)	Omdurman Stadium, Omdurman
9	1959	Al Neel SC (Khartoum)			
10	1960	Al-Merrikh SC			
	1961	Not held			
11	1962	Al-Merrikh SC	1-0	Al-Hilal SC	Omdurman Stadium, Omdurman
	1963-1989	Not held			
12	1990	Al-Ittihad	1–0 / 2–1	Al-Merrikh	Al-Hasahisa Stadium, Al-Hasahisa
13	1991	Al-Merrikh	1–0	Hilal Alsahil	Khartoum Stadium, Khartoum
	1992	Not held			
14	1993	Al-Merrikh	3–1	Al-Hilal	Khartoum Stadium, Khartoum
15	1994	Al-Merrikh	1–0	Al-Hilal	Khartoum Stadium, Khartoum
16	1995	Al-Mourada	2–1	Hilal Alsahil	Khartoum Stadium, Khartoum
17	1996	Al-Merrikh	1–0	Al-Hilal	Khartoum Stadium, Khartoum
18	1997	Al-Mourada	2–0	Al-Merrikh	Khartoum Stadium, Khartoum
19	1998	Al-Hilal	0–0 (5–4 p)	Al-Merrikh	Khartoum Stadium, Khartoum
	1999	Not held			
20	2000	Al-Hilal	3–0	Al-Ahli	Khartoum Stadium, Khartoum
21	2001	Al-Merrikh	1–0	Al-Mourada	Khartoum Stadium, Khartoum
22	2002	Al-Hilal	2–0 (awarded)	Al-Merrikh	Khartoum Stadium, Khartoum
	2003	Not held			
23	2004	Al-Hilal	0–0 (3–2 p)	Al-Merrikh	Khartoum Stadium, Khartoum
24	2005	Al-Merrikh	0–0 (4–2 p)	Al-Hilal	Khartoum Stadium, Khartoum
25	2006	Al-Merrikh	2–0	Al-Hilal	Khartoum Stadium, Khartoum
26	2007	Al-Merrikh	1–0	Al-Hilal	Khartoum Stadium, Khartoum
27	2008	Al-Merrikh	0–0 (2–0 p)	Al-Hilal	Khartoum Stadium, Khartoum
28	2009	Al-Hilal	2–1	Al-Merrikh	Khartoum Stadium, Khartoum
29	2010	Al-Merrikh	2–0	Al-Hilal	Khartoum Stadium, Khartoum
30	2011	Al-Hilal	2–0 (awarded)	Al-Merrikh	Khartoum Stadium, Khartoum
31	2012	Al-Merrikh	0–0 (3–1 p)	Al-Hilal	Khartoum Stadium, Khartoum
32	2013	Al-Merrikh	2–0 (awarded)	Al-Hilal	Ad Damazin Stadium, Ad Damazin
33	2014	Al-Merrikh	3–1	Al-Hilal	Khartoum Stadium, Khartoum
34	2015	Al-Merrikh	2–0 (awarded)	Al-Hilal	Dongola Stadium, Dongola
35	2016	Al-Hilal	2–1	El-Hilal El Obeid	Wad Madani Stadium, Wad Madani
36	2017	Al-Ahly Shendi	1–1 (4–2 p)	Al-Hilal	Khartoum Stadium, Khartoum
37	2018	Al-Merrikh	4–1	El-Hilal El Obeid	Khartoum Stadium, Khartoum
	2018–19	Not held			
	2019–20	Not held			
	2020–21	Not held			
38	2021–22	Al-Hilal	0–0 (4–3 P)	Al Ahli	Al-Hilal Stadium, Omdurman
	2022-23	Not held			
	2023-24	Not held			
39	2024-25	Al-Hilal SC	3-0 (awarded)	Al-Merrikh SC	Port Sudan Stadium, Port Sudan
40	2025-26	Al-Ahli SC (Wad Madani)	3 - 1	Al Hilal ESC (Al-Fasher)	Khartoum Stadium, Khartoum

== Performance by club ==
Club	City	Winners	Runners-up	Winning years	Runners-up years
Al-Merrikh	Omdurman	19	7	1951, 1955, 1961, 1962, 1991, 1993, 1994, 1996, 2001, 2005, 2006, 2007, 2008, 2010, 2012, 2013, 2014, 2015, 2018	1997, 1998, 2002, 2004, 2009, 2011, 2024-25
Al-Hilal	Omdurman	10	15	1954, 1998, 2000, 2002, 2004, 2009, 2011, 2016, 2021–22, 2024-25	1955, 1962, 1993, 1994, 1996, 2005, 2006, 2007, 2008, 2010, 2012, 2013, 2014, 2015, 2017
Al Neel SC (Khartoum)	Khartoum	5	0	1952, 1956, 1957, 1958, 1959	
Al-Mourada	Omdurman	3	1	1953, 1995, 1997	2001
Al Ahli SC (Wad Madani)	Wad Madani	2	2	1953, 2025-26	1954, 2000
Al Ahli SC (Khartoum)	Khartoum	1	1	1958	2021-22
Al-Tahrir SC (Bahri)	Bahri	1	0	1951	
Al-Rabita SC (Wad Madani)	Wad Madani	1	0	1956	
Al-Ittihad	Wad Madani	1	0	1990	
Al-Ahly Shendi	Shendi	1	0	2017	
Hilal Alsahil	Port Sudan	0	2		1991, 1995
El-Hilal El Obeid	El Obeid	0	2		2016, 2018
Al-Merrikh	Al-Hasahisa	0	1		1990
Al Hilal ESC (Al-Fasher)	Al-Fasher	0	1		2025-26
