= Elsadig Hassan =

Sudanese footballer (born 1996)

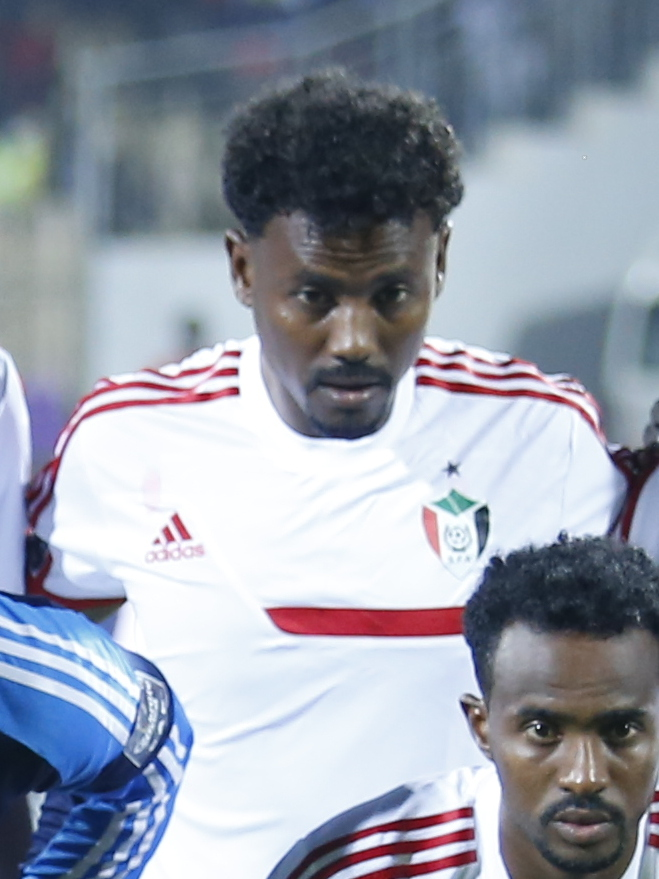
- Hassan with Sudan in 2022

Personal information
- Full name: Elsadig Hassan Musa Ahmed
- Date of birth: 4 September 1996 (age 30)
- Place of birth: Wad Madani, Sudan
- Height: 1.83 m (6 ft 0 in)
- Position: Centre-back

Team information
- Current team: Al-Hilal SC (Tobrok)
- Number: 5

Senior career*
Years	Team	Apps	(Gls)
2012–2014	Al-Jerif SC (Khartoum)		
2014–2018	Al-Ahly Shendi		
2018–2021	Al Ahli Merowe		
2021–2022	Al-Shorta Al-Qadarif		
2022–2024	Al Ahli SC (Khartoum)		
2024–	Al-Hilal SC (Tobrok)		

International career^{‡}
2022–	Sudan	5	(0)
- * Club domestic league appearances and goals as of 00:23, 9 January 2022 (UTC) ‡ National team caps and goals as of 06:31, 23 January 2023 (UTC)

Elsadig Hassan (Arabic: الصادق حسن; born 4 September 1996) is a Sudanese footballer who plays as a centre-back for Al Ahli SC (Khartoum) and the Sudan national team.
