= Salah Nemer =

Sudanese footballer

Personal information
- Full name: Salaheldin Mahmoud Nemer
- Date of birth: 5 February 1992 (age 34)
- Height: 1.90 m (6 ft 3 in)
- Position: Centre-back

Team information
- Current team: Al-Ahli SC (Wad Madani)
- Number: 5

Senior career*
| Years | Team | Apps | (Gls) |
| 2009–2011 | Al-Merreikh Al-Thagher | | |
| 2012–2016 | Al-Khartoum | | |
| 2016–2024 | Al-Merreikh | | |
| 2025–2026 | Olympic Azzaweya SC | | |
| 2026– | Al-Ahli SC (Wad Madani) | | |

International career^{‡}
| 2014– | Sudan | 21 | (0) |
- * Club domestic league appearances and goals as of 12 August 2026 ‡ National team caps and goals as of 27 March 2023

Salaheldin Mahmoud Nemer (Arabic: صلاح الدين محمود نمر; born 5 February 1992) is a Sudanese professional footballer who plays as a centre-back.
