= Football at the 2023 Arab Games =

كرة القدم في الألعاب الرياضية العربية 2023

Tournament details
- Host country: Algeria
- Dates: 2–14 July
- Teams: 8 (from 2 confederations)
- Venues: 2 (in 2 host cities)

Final positions
- Champions: Saudi Arabia (1st title)
- Runners-up: Syria
- Third place: Sudan
- Fourth place: Algeria

Tournament statistics
- Matches played: 16
- Goals scored: 34 (2.13 per match)
- Top scorer(s): Al-Jezoli Nouh (5 goals)

The men's football tournament at the 2023 Arab Games was held from 2 to 14 July 2023 in Algeria, following an 11-year hiatus. Matches were played in Annaba and Constantine. For the first time, teams were restricted to under-23 players, and a maximum of three over-aged players.

Bahrain were the defending champions, having beat Jordan in the final of the 2011 edition.

== Stadiums ==
City	Stadium	Capacity
Annaba	19 May 1956 Stadium	58,100
Constantine	Mohamed Hamlaoui Stadium	22,986

== Teams ==
=== Participating countries ===
Eight teams participated in the tournament, all under-23 with the exception of Saudi Arabia, who participated with their under-19 team.

Confederation	Nation
CAF (Africa)	Algeria; Mauritania; Sudan
AFC (Asia)	Lebanon; Oman; Palestine; Saudi Arabia; Syria

== Draw ==
The draw took place on 19 June 2023. Host Algeria was automatically seeded in Pot 1. The remaining teams were seeded based on the FIFA ranking.

Pot 1	Pot 2	Pot 3	Pot 4
Algeria (hosts); Saudi Arabia	Oman; Syria	Palestine; Lebanon	Mauritania; Sudan

== Officiating ==
Referees

- (Algeria) Nabil Boukhalfa
- (Algeria) Abdemoumene Touabti
- (Bahrain) Mohamed Khaled
- (Iraq) Zaid Thamer Mohammed
- (Kuwait) Ammar Ashkanani
- (Mauritania) Abdel Aziz Mohamed Bouh
- (Palestine) Muath Owfi
- (Syria) Mohammad Qanah
- (Tunisia) Mehrez Melki

Assistant referees

- (Algeria) Hamza Bouzit
- (Jordan) Amro Ajaj
- (Morocco) Yahya Nouali
- (Lebanon) Ali Fakih
- (Libya) Basem Saef El Naser
- (Oman) Hamooh Al Shuaibi
- (Palestine) Kinan Al-Baajawi
- (Saudi Arabia) Ibrahim Al-Dakheel
- (Somalia) Mowlid Rage Ali
- (Tunisia) Mohamed Bakir

== Group stage ==
All times are local, AST (UTC+1).

=== Group A ===
Pos	Team	Pld	W	D	L	GF	GA	GD	Pts	Qualification
1	Algeria (H)	3	2	1	0	4	1	+3	7	Advance to semi-finals
2	Sudan	3	2	0	1	6	2	+4	6	Advance to semi-finals
3	Oman	3	1	1	1	1	2	−1	4	
4	Lebanon	3	0	0	3	0	6	−6	0	

Source: GSA
(H) Hosts
2 July 2023
17:30

Lebanon	0–3	Sudan
	Report	Nooh 14', 49'; Ezzallah 90'

19 May 1956 Stadium, Annaba
Referee: Abdel Aziz Bouh (Mauritania)
2 July 2023
21:00

Algeria	0–0	Oman
	Report

19 May 1956 Stadium, Annaba
Referee: Muath Owfi (Palestine)

5 July 2023
17:30

Oman	1–0	Lebanon
Al Habashi 40'	Report

19 May 1956 Stadium, Annaba
Referee: Ammar Ashkanani (Kuwait)
5 July 2023
21:00

Sudan	1–2	Algeria
Ismat 75'	Report	Temine 87', 90+2'

19 May 1956 Stadium, Annaba
Referee: Mohammad Qanah (Syria)

8 July 2023
21:00

Sudan	2–0	Oman
Nooh 3'; Saadalla 90'	Report

Mohamed Hamlaoui Stadium, Constantine
Referee: Mehrez Melki (Tunisia)
8 July 2023
21:00

Algeria	2–0	Lebanon
Bounacer 16'; Sryer 90+3'	Report

19 May 1956 Stadium, Annaba
Referee: Mohamed Khaled (Bahrain)

=== Group B ===
Pos	Team	Pld	W	D	L	GF	GA	GD	Pts	Qualification
1	Syria	3	1	2	0	5	3	+2	5	Advance to semi-finals
2	Saudi Arabia	3	1	2	0	4	3	+1	5	Advance to semi-finals
3	Palestine	3	0	2	1	2	3	−1	2	
4	Mauritania	3	0	2	1	4	6	−2	2	

Source: GSA
2 July 2023
17:30

Saudi Arabia	1–1	Syria
Al-Zaid 90+6' (pen.)	Report	Mardikian 18'

Mohamed Hamlaoui Stadium, Constantine
Referee: Mehrez Melki (Tunisia)
2 July 2023
21:00

Palestine	1–1	Mauritania
Rabei 5'	Report	Elwely 24'

Mohamed Hamlaoui Stadium, Constantine
Referee: Abdemoumene Touabti (Algeria)

5 July 2023
17:30

Syria	0–0	Palestine
	Report

Mohamed Hamlaoui Stadium, Constantine
Referee: Mohamed Khaled (Bahrain)
5 July 2023
21:00

Mauritania	1–1	Saudi Arabia
Baye 13'	Report	Al-Zaid 26' (pen.)

Mohamed Hamlaoui Stadium, Constantine
Referee: Zaid Thamer Mohammed (Iraq)

8 July 2023
17:30

Saudi Arabia	2–1	Palestine
Al-Abdulwahed 37'; Al-Hassan 62'	Report	Bani Odeh 40'

Mohamed Hamlaoui Stadium, Constantine
Referee: Nabil Boukhalfa (Algeria)
8 July 2023
17:30

Mauritania	2–4	Syria
Sheikh 16'; Ahmed 21'	Report	Mardikian 6'; Dahan 55'; Rihani 60'; Osman 70'

19 May 1956 Stadium, Annaba
Referee: Ammar Ashkanani (Kuwait)

== Knockout stage ==
Semifinals
11 July – Annaba
Algeria	1
Saudi Arabia	2
11 July – Annaba
Syria	2
Sudan	0

Final
14 July – Annaba
Saudi Arabia (p)	1 (5)
Syria	1(4)
Third place
14 July – Annaba
Algeria	2 (2)
Sudan (p)	2 (4)

=== Semi-finals ===
11 July 2023
17:30

Algeria	1–2	Saudi Arabia
Temine 49'	Report	A. Al-Zaid 19'; S. Al-Zaid 74'

19 May 1956 Stadium, Annaba
Referee: Abdel Aziz Mohamed Bouh (Mauritania)
11 July 2023
21:00

Syria	2–0	Sudan
Asaad 58'; Mardikian 73'	Report

19 May 1956 Stadium, Annaba
Referee: Zaid Thamer Mohammed (Iraq)

=== Bronze medal match ===
14 July 2023
17:30

Algeria	2–2	Sudan
Temine 16'; Nait Salem 58'	Report	Nooh 87', 90+2'
Penalties
Benzid (penalty missed); Reguieg (penalty scored); Djenidi (penalty missed); Bouras (penalty scored)	2–4	(penalty missed) Nooh; (penalty scored) Mahmoud; (penalty scored) Ali; (penalty scored) Al-Bahli; (penalty scored) Babeker

19 May 1956 Stadium, Annaba
Referee: Mohamed Khaled (Bahrain)

=== Gold medal match ===
14 July 2023
21:00

Saudi Arabia	1–1	Syria
S. Al-Zaid 11'	Report	Mardikian 45'
Penalties
S. Al-Zaid (penalty scored); Al-Jelidan (penalty scored); A. Al-Zaid (penalty scored); Khalifa (penalty missed); Ayash (penalty scored); Al-Khaibari (penalty scored)	5–4	(penalty scored) Mardikian; (penalty scored) Al Rina; (penalty scored) Al Hussain; (penalty scored) Dahhan; (penalty missed) Rihanieh; (penalty missed) Dali

19 May 1956 Stadium, Annaba
Referee: Mehrez Melki (Tunisia)

== Final ranking ==
Pos	Team	Pld	W	D	L	GF	GA	GD	Pts	Final result
1st place, gold medalist(s)	Saudi Arabia	5	2	3	0	7	5	+2	9	Gold Medal
2nd place, silver medalist(s)	Syria	5	2	3	0	8	4	+4	9	Silver Medal
3rd place, bronze medalist(s)	Sudan	5	2	1	2	8	6	+2	7	Bronze Medal
4	Algeria (H)	5	2	2	1	7	5	+2	8	Fourth place
5	Oman	3	1	1	1	1	2	−1	4	Eliminated in group stage
6	Palestine	3	0	2	1	2	3	−1	2	Eliminated in group stage
7	Mauritania	3	0	2	1	4	6	−2	2	Eliminated in group stage
8	Lebanon	3	0	0	3	0	6	−6	0	Eliminated in group stage

(H) Hosts

== Goalscorers ==
There have been 34 goals scored in 16 matches, for an average of 2.12 goals per match (as of 15 July 2023).

5 goals

- (Sudan) Al-Jezoli Nouh

4 goals

- (Saudi Arabia) Suhaib Al-Zaid
- (Syria) Mardik Mardikian

3 goals

- (Algeria) Mounder Temine

1 goal

- (Algeria) Abdessamed Bounacer
- (Algeria) Massinissa Nait Salem
- (Algeria) Boualem Sryer
- (Mauritania) Syed Ahmed
- (Mauritania) Cheikh Baye
- (Mauritania) Hmeide Cheikh Elwely
- (Mauritania) Ahmed Sheikh
- (Palestine) Anas Bani Odeh
- (Palestine) Ali Rabei
- (Saudi Arabia) Abbas Al-Hassan
- (Saudi Arabia) Faisal Al-Abdulwahed
- (Sudan) Suleiman Ezzalla Hamouda
- (Sudan) Mohamed Al-Hassan Ismat
- (Sudan) Maysara Saadalla
- (Syria) Hassan Dahan
- (Syria) Huzan Osman
- (Syria) Muhammad Rihani
