= 2018 Sudan Cup =

Tournament details
- Country: Sudan

The 2018 Sudan Cup was the 43rd edition of the Sudanese knockout football competition since its inception in 1990. Al-Merrikh triumphed over Hilal Al-Obied with a score of 4–1.

== Round of 16 ==
Team 1	Score	Team 2
Hay Al-Arab Port Sudan	3 : 0 (awd)	Alamal Atbara
Wd Hashem Senar	1 : 0	Al Hilal Omdurman
Merikh Kosti	0 : 0 (4 : 5 p)	Ahli Al Khartoum
Ahli Marawi	0 : 2	FC Ahli Shandi
Marekh Tambol	0 : 4	Khartoum Alwatani
Ishraga Algdaref	0 : 5	Al Merrikh
Alamal Alhora	0 : 4	Hilal Kadougli
Osod Darfur	0 : 1	Hilal Al-Obied

== Quarter-finals ==
Team 1	Score	Team 2
FC Ahli Shandi	1 : 0	Hay Al-Arab Port Sudan
Ahli Al Khartoum	3 : 0	Wd Hashem Senar
Al Merrikh	1 : 0	Khartoum Alwatani
Hilal Kadougli	1 : 2	Hilal Al-Obied

== Semi-finals ==
Team 1	Score	Team 2
26 Sep 2018
Al Merrikh	3 : 0	Ahli Al Khartoum
29 Sep 2018
Hilal Al-Obied	2 : 0	FC Ahli Shandi

== Final ==
Team 1	Score	Team 2
7 Oct 2018
Al Merrikh	4 : 1	Hilal Al-Obied

== See also ==
- 2018 Sudan Premier League
