= Mazin Mohamedein =

Sudanese footballer (born 2000)

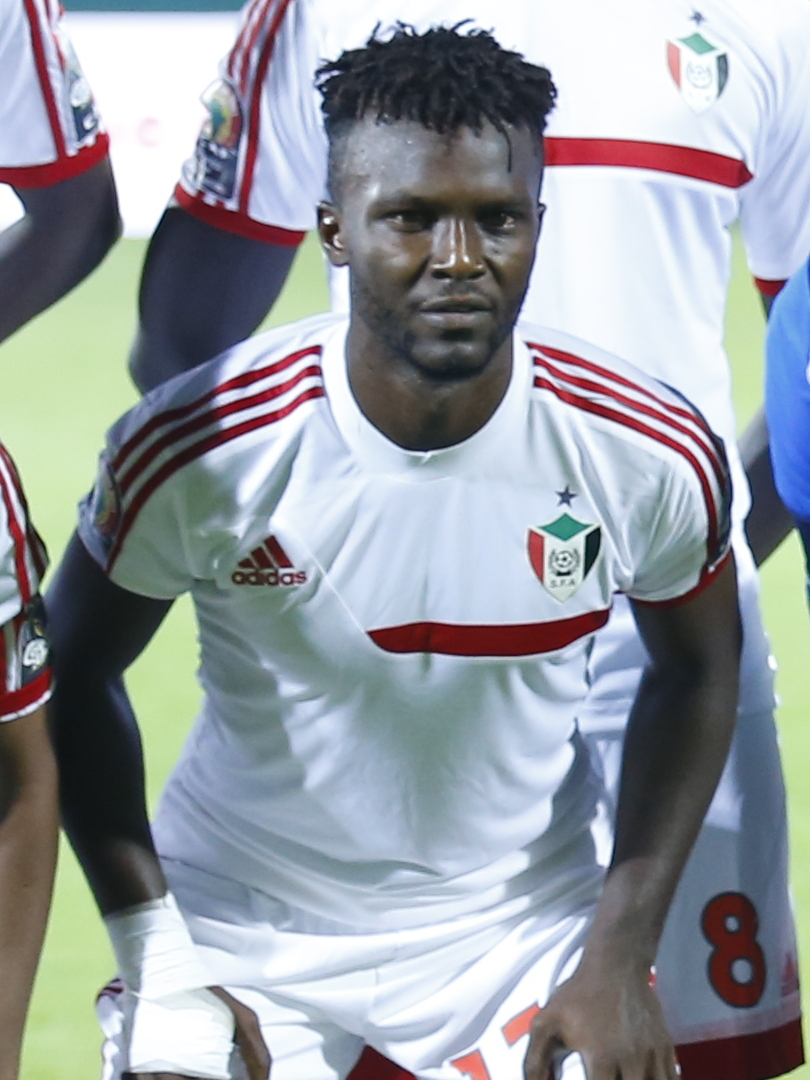
- Mohamedein with Sudan in 2022

Personal information
- Full name: Mazin Mohamedein Al-Nour Mohamed
- Date of birth: 2 May 2000 (age 26)
- Place of birth: Al-Fulah, Sudan
- Position: Left-back

Team information
- Current team: Al Ta'awon SC
- Number: 17

Senior career*
Years	Team	Apps	(Gls)
2012-2014	Al-Amal SC (Al-Fula)		
2015	Al-Shabia SC (Bahri)		
2015–2017	Ombada SC		
2018–2020	El Hilal El Obeid		
2020–2021	Al-Merrikh		
2021–2022	Tuti SC (Khartoum)		
2022–2024	Al-Merrikh SC		
2024-2026	Al Akhdar SC		
2026-	Al Ta'awon SC		

International career^{‡}
2017	Sudan U20	1	(0)
2021–	Sudan	14	(0)
- * Club domestic league appearances and goals as of 18:26, 1 August 2024 (UTC) ‡ National team caps and goals as of 18:26, 16 November 2026 (UTC)

Mazin Mohamedein Al-Nour Mohamed (Arabic: مازن محمدين النور محمد; born 2 May 2000) is a Sudanese professional footballer who plays as a left-back for the Sudanese club Al Akhdar SC and the Sudan national team.

== International career ==
Mohamedein made his international debut with the Sudan national team in a 3–2 friendly loss to Ethiopia on 30 December 2021. He was part of the Sudan squad that was called up for the 2021 Africa Cup of Nations.
