= Al-Hasahisa =

Al-Hasahisa الحصاحيصا
- Town
- Location of Al-Hasahisa in Sudan
- Coordinates: 14°44′23″N 33°17′39″E
- Country: Sudan
- State: Gezira
- Time zone: UTC+2 (CAT)

Al-Hasahisa (Arabic: الحصاحيصا) is a town in Gezira State, Sudan, located near Wad Madani.

== History ==
Amid the Sudanese civil war, on 1 February 2025, the Sudanese Armed Forces (SAF) claimed to have retaken the town from the Rapid Support Forces (RSF).

== Sports ==
- Al Neel SC (Al-Hasahisa)
