= Al-Jezoli Nouh =

Sudanese footballer

Personal information
- Full name: Al-Jezoli Hussien Nouh Mohamed
- Date of birth: 24 October 2002 (age 24)
- Place of birth: Sudan
- Height: 1.77 m (5 ft 10 in)
- Position: Forward

Team information
- Current team: Al-Ahli SC (Tripoli)
- Number: 21

Senior career*
Years	Team	Apps	(Gls)
2018–2020	Al-Jerif SC (Khartoum)		
2020-2024	Al-Merrikh SC		
2024	Al-Nasr (Benghazi) (loan)		
2024-2025	Al-Ahli SC (Tripoli)	4	(1)
2026-	Al Akhdar SC		

International career^{‡}
2022-	Sudan U23	1	(1)
2021–	Sudan	37	(2)
Medal record
Men's football
Representing Sudan
Arab Games
Bronze medal – third place	2023 Algeria
- * Club domestic league appearances and goals as of 8 February 2026 ‡ National team caps and goals as of 16 November 2026

Al-Jezoli Hussien Nouh Mohamed (born 24 October 2002) is a Sudanese professional footballer who plays as a winger for Al-Merrikh and the Sudan national football team.

== Honours ==
Sudan

- Arab Games bronze medalist: 2023
