= Jefferson Encada =

Bissau-Guinean professional footballer (born 1998)

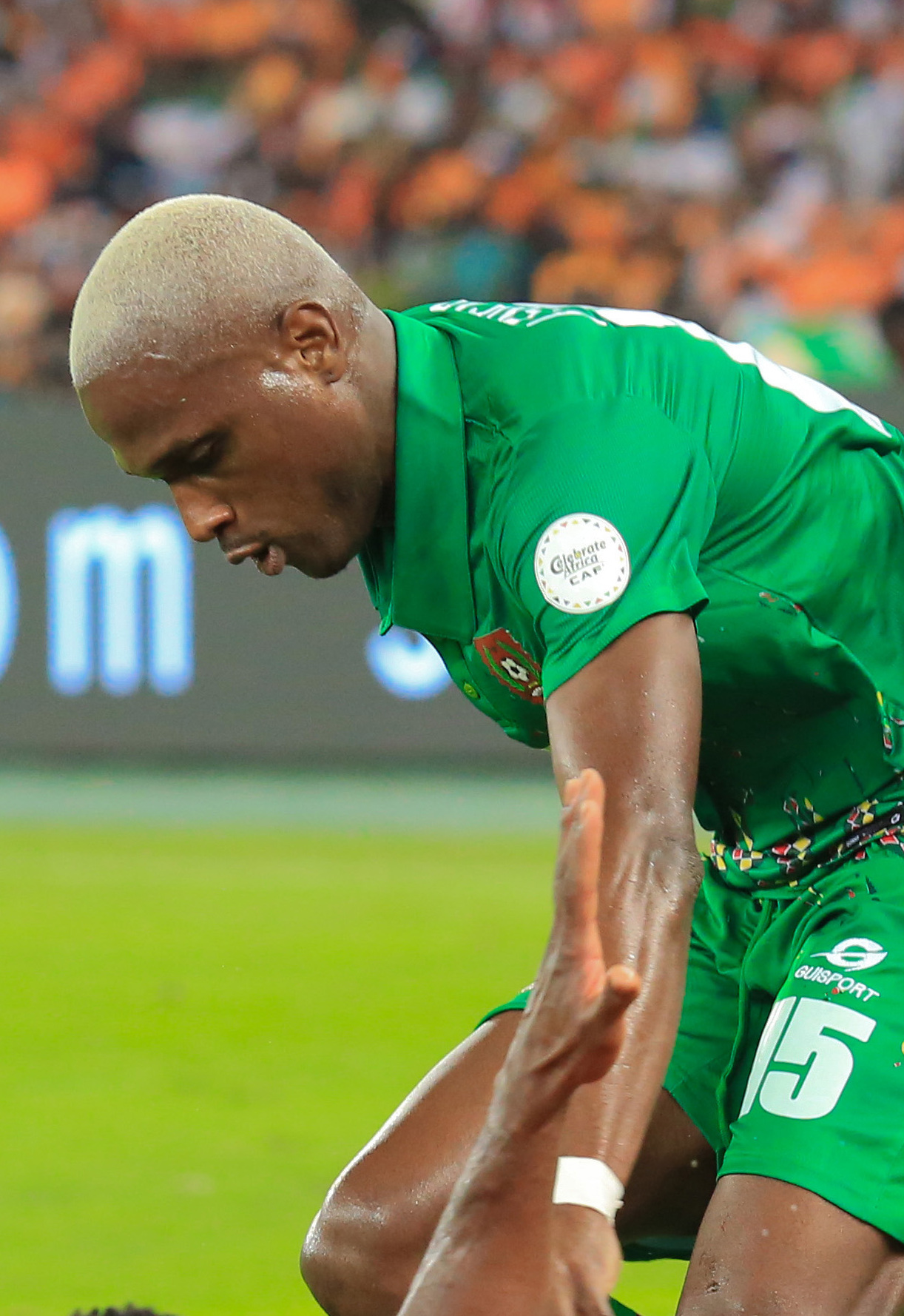
- Encada in 2024

Personal information
- Full name: Jefferson Anilson Silva Encada
- Date of birth: 17 April 1998 (age 28)
- Place of birth: Bissau, Guinea-Bissau
- Height: 1.88 m (6 ft 2 in)
- Positions: Right-back; winger

Team information
- Current team: Estrela da Amadora
- Number: 17

Youth career
- 2013–2017: Sporting CP

Senior career*
Years	Team	Apps	(Gls)
2017–2018	Olhanense	20	(3)
2018–2020	Vitória Guimarães B	28	(4)
2019–2020	Vitória Guimarães	1	(0)
2020–2022	Leixões	30	(5)
2022–2025	Pharco	96	(1)
2025–	Estrela da Amadora	26	(0)

International career^{‡}
2021–	Guinea-Bissau	35	(0)
- * Club domestic league appearances and goals as of 25 May 2026 ‡ National team caps and goals as of 29 September 2026

Jefferson Anilson Silva Encada (born 17 April 1998) is a Bissau-Guinean professional footballer who plays as a right-back or winger for Primeira Liga club Estrela da Amadora.

== Club career ==
On 28 October 2018, Encada made his professional debut with Vitória Guimarães B in a 2018–19 LigaPro match against Paços Ferreira.

He made his Primeira Liga debut for Vitória Guimarães on 8 September 2019 in a game against Rio Ave.

== International career ==
He made his debut for Guinea-Bissau national football team on 26 March 2021 in an AFCON 2021 qualifier against Eswatini.

== Career statistics ==
=== International ===
As of match played 29 September 2026

Appearances and goals by national team and year
National team	Year	Apps	Goals
Guinea-Bissau	2021	4	0
Guinea-Bissau	2022	7	0
Guinea-Bissau	2023	5	0
Guinea-Bissau	2024	12	0
Guinea-Bissau	2025	5	0
Guinea-Bissau	2026	2	0
Total		35	0
