= Mustafa Karshoum =

Sudanese footballer

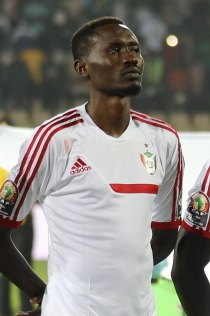
- Karshoum in January 2022

Personal information
- Full name: Mustafa Muhamed Abdelgader Karshoum
- Date of birth: 6 December 1992 (age 33)
- Place of birth: Khartoum, Sudan
- Height: 1.87 m (6 ft 2 in)
- Position: Centre-back

Team information
- Current team: Al-Hilal SC
- Number: 19

Senior career*
Years	Team	Apps	(Gls)
2012–2013	Al-Sika Hadid SC (Nyala)		
2014–2016	Al-Merreikh SC (Nyala)		
2016–2021	Al Khartoum SC		
2021–2024	Al-Merrikh SC		
2024–2025	Asswehly SC		
2025–	Al-Hilal SC		

International career^{‡}
2018–	Sudan	38	(1)
- * Club domestic league appearances and goals as of 09:06, 13 August 2025 (UTC) ‡ National team caps and goals as of 22:00, 16 November 2026 (UTC)

Mustafa Muhamed Abdelgader Karshoum (born 6 December 1992) is a Sudanese footballer who plays as a centre-back for Al-Merrikh SC and the Sudan national team.
