= Leonel Alves (footballer, born 1993) =

Andorran footballer

Personal information
- Full name: Leonel Felipe Alves Alves
- Date of birth: 28 September 1993 (age 33)
- Position: Defensive midfielder

Senior career*
Years	Team	Apps	(Gls)
2011–2012	Santa Coloma		
2012–2016	FC Andorra	101	(22)
2016–2017	Santa Coloma	3	(0)
2017–2018	Sant Julià	15	(1)
2018	Santa Coloma	7	(0)
2019–2021	La Massana		

International career
2011	Andorra U19	3	(0)
2011–2014	Andorra U21	15	(0)
2014–2015	Andorra	3	(0)
- * Club domestic league appearances and goals

Leonel Felipe Alves Alves (born 28 September 1993) is an Andorran professional footballer who plays as a defensive midfielder.

== Club career ==
Alves has played club football for Santa Coloma, FC Andorra, Sant Julià, and La Massana.

== International career ==
Alvesif made his international debut for the Andorra national team in 2014.
