= Al Neel SC (Khartoum) =

Sudanese football club

- Full name: Al Neel Sports Club
- Founded: 1934
- Ground: Khartoum Stadium
- Capacity: 30,000

Al Neel Sports Club (Arabic: نادي النيل الرياضي) also known as Al Neel Al-Khartoum is a Sudanese football club based in Khartoum, it was founded in 1934. They play in the top division in Sudanese football, Sudan Premier League. Their home stadium is Khartoum Stadium. The team won the Sudan Cup in 1978.

== Honours ==
=== National titles ===
- Sudan Cup
- Winners (5): 1952, 1956, 1957, 1958, 1959

== Performance in CAF competitions ==
- African Cup Winners' Cup: 0 appearances

1979 – Withdrew
