= Khartoum League =

Sudan football league

The Khartoum League began in 1952 and was a famous historical regional championship in Sudan. The teams playing in it were those from the three cities of the capital Khartoum; Khartoum, Bahri, and Omdurman.

The most famous winners of the Khartoum league were the two traditionally strong teams from Sudan, Al-Merrikh and Al-Hilal. They won the championship 17 and 16 times respectively before their eventual withdrawal in 1997. No team had exceeded the number of tiles of Al-Merreikh even though the club has not taken part in the competition since early 1997.

== Championship history ==
- 1- 1952: Al-Tahrir SC (Bahri)
- 2- 1953: Al-Hilal Club
- 3- 1954: Al-Merrikh SC
- 4- 1955: Al-Hilal Club
- 5- 1956: Al-Merrikh SC
- - 1957: No Championship
- 6- 1958: Al-Hilal Club
- 7- 1959: Al-Hilal Club
- 8- 1960: Al-Hilal Club
- 9- 1961: Al-Hilal Club
- 10- 1962: Al-Merrikh SC
- 11- 1963: Al-Hilal Club
- 12- 1964: Al Neel SC (Khartoum)
- 13- 1965: Al-Hilal Club
- 14- 1966: Al-Merrikh SC
- 15- 1967: Al-Hilal Club
- 16- 1968: Al-Merrikh SC
- 17- 1969: Al-Hilal Club
- - 1970: No Championship
- 18- 1971: Al-Hilal Club
- 19- 1972: Al-Merrikh SC
- 20- 1973: Al-Hilal Club
- - 1974: No Championship
- 21- 1975: Al-Merrikh SC
- - 1976: No Championship
- - 1977: No Championship
- - 1978: No Championship
- 22- 1979: Al-Mourada SC
- 23- 1980: Al-Merrikh SC
- 24- 1981: Al-Merrikh SC
- 25- 1982: Al-Hilal Club
- 26- 1983: Al-Merrikh SC
- 27- 1984: Al-Hilal Club
- 28- 1985: Al-Merrikh SC
- 29- 1986: Al-Merrikh SC
- - 1987: No Championship
- - 1988: No Championship
- - 1989: No Championship
- 30- 1990: Al-Hilal Club
- 31- 1991: Al-Merrikh SC
- 32- 1992: Al-Merrikh SC
- 33- 1993: Al-Merrikh SC
- 34- 1994: Al-Hilal Club
- 35- 1995: Al-Mourada SC
- 36- 1996: Al-Merrikh SC
- 37- 1997: Al-Merrikh SC
- 38- 1998: Shambat SC
- 39- 1999: Burri SC
- - 2020-21: Al-Zoma SC
