= Mohamed Mustafa (footballer, born 1996) =

Sudanese footballer

Muhamed Mustafa
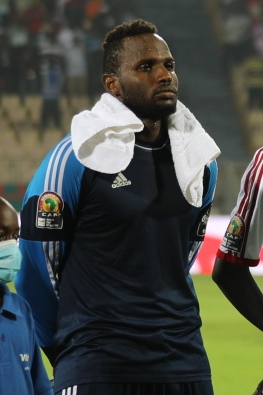
- Mustafa with Sudan in 2022

Personal information
- Full name: Muhamed Mustafa Muhamed Ahmed
- Date of birth: 19 February 1996 (age 30)
- Place of birth: Sudan
- Height: 1.78 m (5 ft 10 in)
- Position: Goalkeeper

Team information
- Current team: Al-Hilal SC
- Number: 33

Senior career*
Years	Team	Apps	(Gls)
2012-2013	Al-Hamadab SC (Khartoum)		
2013–2014	Al-Merreikh SC (Al-Fasher)		
2014–2024	Al-Merrikh SC		
2017	Al-Merrikh SC (Nyala) (loan)		
2018	Al-Ahli Club (Atbara) (loan)		
2024	Azam FC (loan)		
2024-2025	Azam FC		
2025-	Al-Hilal SC		

International career^{‡}
2015	Sudan u23	3	(0)
2015–	Sudan	30	(0)
- * Club domestic league appearances and goals as of 2 July 2024 ‡ National team caps and goals as of 16 November 2026

Muhamed Mustafa Muhamed Ahmed (Arabic: مُحَمَّد مُصْطَفَى مُحَمَّد أَحْمَد; born 19 February 1996) is a Sudanese professional footballer who plays as a goalkeeper for Azam FC and the Sudan national team.

In a 2026 FIFA World Cup CAF Qualifying game against Senegal, Mustafa had a Man of the Match level performance against the Teranga Lions, solidifying Sudan's place at the top of Group B.
