= Muhamed Kesra =

Sudanese footballer

Personal information
- Full name: Muhamed Kesra Hakeem
- Date of birth: 25 October 1996 (age 30)
- Position: Centre-back

Team information
- Current team: Jamus FC
- Number: 3

Senior career*
Years	Team	Apps	(Gls)
2015–2021	Al Khartoum SC		
2021–2022	Hay Al-Arab SC		
2022–2024	Al-Merrikh SC		
2024–	Jamus FC		

International career^{‡}
2022–	Sudan	9	(0)
- * Club domestic league appearances and goals as of 19:24, 24 June 2024 (UTC) ‡ National team caps and goals as of 20:00, 16 November 2026 (UTC)

Muhamed Kesra Hakeem (born 25 October 1996) is a Sudanese footballer who plays as a centre-back for Al-Merrikh SC and the Sudan national team.
