= Ahmed Sheikh =

Ahmed Sheikh (born 1949) is a Palestinian journalist and the current editor-in-chief of the Qatar-based television channel Al Jazeera.

Ahmed Sheikh was born in Nablus in the West Bank. He left his homeland in 1968 to study in Jordan.

== Views on the Arab-Israeli Conflict ==
In 2006 Sheikh gave an interview to correspondent Pierre Heumann of Swiss weekly magazine Die Weltwoche based in Zürich, and said that in Arab culture, a suicide attack is called a "commando attack" and is "precisely not suicide". In this interview Sheikh agrees that there are many issues with the state of Arab countries' economies, that "the rich get richer and the poor get still poorer", and that the public schools and public hospitals are in a very poor shape. In Sheikh's opinion Israel is responsible for most of these problems. When asked by Heumann, if he meant "to say that if Israel did not exist, there would suddenly be democracy in Egypt, that the schools in Morocco would be better, or that the public clinics in Jordan would function better?", Sheikh responded: "I think so." When asked what the Israeli-Palestinian conflict has to do with these problems, and whether it is a matter of feelings of self-esteem, he replied, "Exactly. It’s because we always lose to Israel. It gnaws at the people in the Middle East that such a small country as Israel, with only about 7 million inhabitants, can defeat the Arab nation with its 350 million. That hurts our collective ego. The Palestinian problem is in the genes of every Arab. The West’s problem is that it does not understand this."
