= Abdel Raouf =

Sudanese footballer

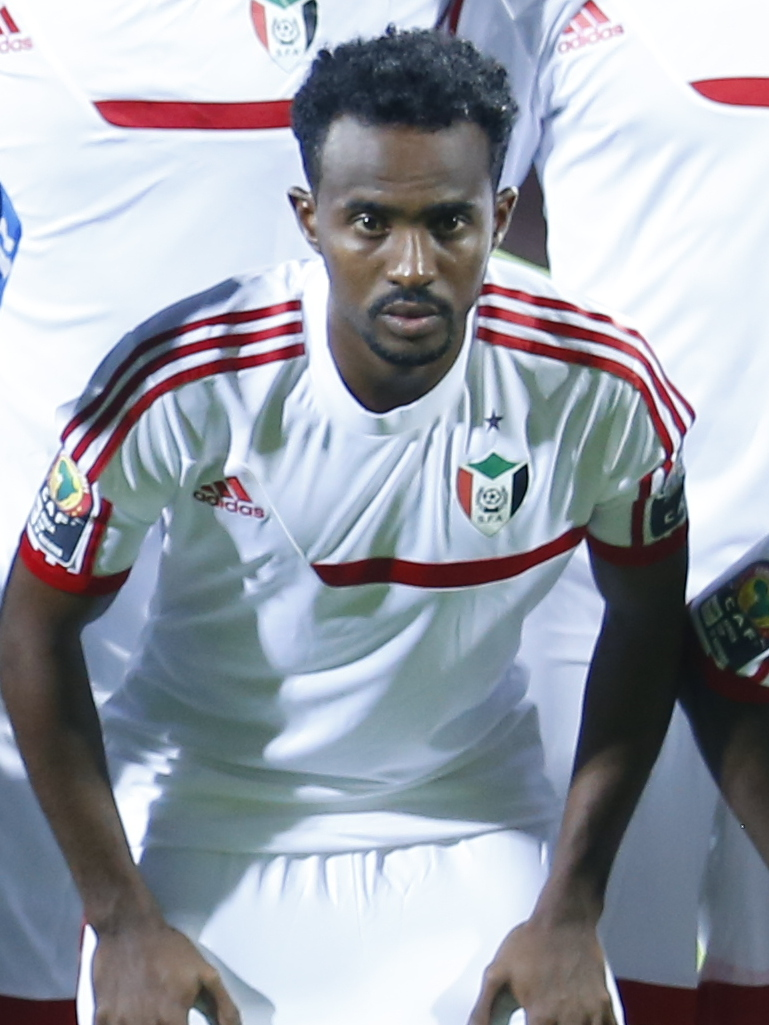
- Raouf with Sudan at the 2021 Africa Cup of Nations

Personal information
- Full name: Abdelrazeg Yagoub Omer Taha
- Date of birth: 18 July 1993 (age 33)
- Position: Midfielder

Team information
- Current team: Al-Hilal SC
- Number: 8

Senior career*
Years	Team	Apps	(Gls)
2013–2015	Al-Afarga Port Sud		
2015–2018	Al-Shurta SC (Al-Qadarif)		
2018–2019	El Hilal El Obeid		
2020–	Al-Hilal SC		

International career^{‡}
2021–	Sudan	44	(2)
- * Club domestic league appearances and goals as of 18:26, 9 January 2020 (UTC) ‡ National team caps and goals as of 09:05, 16 November 2026 (UTC)

Abdelrazeg Yagoub Omer Taha (Arabic: عبد الرازق يعقوب عمر طه; born 18 July 1993), known as just Abdel Raouf, is a Sudanese professional footballer who plays as a midfielder for Sudan Premier League club Al-Hilal SC and the Sudan national team.

== International career ==
Raouf made his international debut with the Sudan national team in a 3–2 friendly loss to Ethiopia on 30 December 2021. He was part of the Sudan squad that was called up for the 2021 Africa Cup of Nations.

== Career statistics ==
=== International ===
As of match played 3 January 2026

Appearances and goals by national team and year
National team	Year	Apps	Goals
Norway	2021	1	0
Norway	2022	15	1
Norway	2023	3	0
Norway	2024	11	1
Norway	2025	19	2
Norway	2026	1	0
Total		50	4

Scores and results list Sudan's goal tally first, score column indicates score after each Abdel Raouf goal.

List of international goals scored by Abdel Raouf
No.	Date	Venue	Opponent	Score	Result	Competition
1	23 September 2022	Abebe Bikila Stadium, Addis Ababa, Ethiopia	Ethiopia	1–1	1–1	Friendly
2	14 March 2024	King Fahd Sports City Stadium, Riyadh, Saudi Arabia	Bangladesh	3–0	3–0	Friendly
3	12 August 2025	Amaan Stadium, Zanzibar City, Tanzania	Nigeria	3–0	4–0	2024 African Nations Championship
4	12 August 2025	Amaan Stadium, Zanzibar City, Tanzania	Nigeria	4–0	4–0	2024 African Nations Championship
