= Leonel Alves (footballer, born 1988) =

Association football player

Personal information
- Full name: Ladislau Leonel Ucha Alves
- Date of birth: 9 May 1988 (age 38)
- Place of birth: Lisbon, Portugal
- Height: 1.74 m (5 ft 9 in)
- Position: Midfielder

Team information
- Current team: Dungannon Swifts
- Number: 13

Senior career*
Years	Team	Apps	(Gls)
2006–2007	Casa Pia		
2007–2009	Olivais e Moscavide	62	(3)
2009–2010	Operário	26	(1)
2010–2011	Tondela	14	(1)
2012	Mafra	8	(0)
2012–2013	Sertanense	28	(5)
2013–2014	Academico Viseu	33	(3)
2014–2016	Oriental	42	(4)
2015–2016	Torreense	7	(1)
2014–2016	Oriental	17	(3)
2016–2017	Pafos	26	(4)
2017–2018	Lusitanos Saint-Maur	28	(4)
2018–2019	Sintrense	29	(1)
2019–2020	Torreense	26	(4)
2020–2022	Marinhense	24	(2)
2022–2023	Cova da Piedade	11	(0)
2023	União de Santarém	10	(1)
2023–	Dungannon Swifts	99	(6)

International career^{‡}
2017–	Guinea-Bissau	10	(0)
- * Club domestic league appearances and goals as of 29 April 2026 ‡ National team caps and goals as of 15:20, 20 April 2022 (UTC)

Ladislau Leonel Ucha Alves (born 9 May 1988), known as Leonel Alves, is a professional footballer who plays as a midfielder for NIFL Premiership club Dungannon Swifts. Born in Portugal, he represents Guinea-Bissau at international level.

== Club career ==
In 2023, Alves signed for Northern Irish side Dungannon Swifts. He helped the club win the 2024–25 Irish Cup. He also helped them achieve fourth place in the league during the 2024–25 season.

== International career ==
Alves made his debut for Guinea-Bissau in a 2019 Africa Cup of Nations qualification win over Namibia on 10 June 2017. He played against Egypt international Mohamed Salah and Senegal international Sadio Mané.

== Honours ==
Dungannon Swifts

- Irish Cup: 2024–25
