= Al Hilal Club (Omdurman) =

Association football club in Sudan

Al Hilal SC
- Full name: Al Hilal Sports Club
- Nicknames: Seed Al-Balad (The Leader of the Country); Al-Mawj Al-Azraq (The Blue Wave); Nadi Al-Haraka Al-Wataniya (National Movement Club); Nadi Al-Shaab (People's Club)
- Founded: 13 February 1930; 96 years ago
- Ground: Al-Hilal Stadium
- Capacity: 25,000
- Chairman: Hesham Hassan Al-Subat
- Manager: Josef Zinnbauer
- League: Rwanda Premier League (temporarily)
- 2024–25: Super D1, 1st out of 16
- Website: alhilalsc.com
Home colours	Away colours	Third colours

Al Hilal Sports Club (Arabic: نادي الهلال), known as Al Hilal Sudani or simply Al Hilal, is a Sudanese professional football club based in Omdurman that competes in the Sudan Premier League. The club currently competes in the Rwanda Premier League, the top-flight of football in Rwanda, due to the Sudanese civil war.

== History ==
Al Hilal was founded on 13 February 1930 in Omdurman by a group of graduates from the Gordon Memorial College. During the Anglo-Egyptian rule of Sudan, colonial authorities strictly prohibited political gatherings. Consequently, nationalist youths utilized the formation of sports clubs as a legal framework for social organization and community mobilization. The club's first administrative board was headed by Babiker Al-Qabbani.

In its early decades, the club introduced several administrative precedents in Sudanese sports. In 1932, Al Hilal became the first club in the country to charge admission fees for a football match during a friendly against a British military team, using the revenue to develop its facilities.

Historically, Al Hilal has been the most successful team in the Sudan Premier League, accumulating 31 national titles. Following the outbreak of the Sudanese civil war in 2023, domestic football competitions were suspended. To maintain competitive activity, the club received authorization from the Confederation of African Football (CAF) to participate in foreign leagues. Al Hilal subsequently joined the Super D1 in Mauritania for the 2024–25 season, winning the championship, and later relocated to compete in the Rwanda Premier League for the 2025–26 season.

== Crest, colours and structure ==
The name Hilal translates to "crescent" in Arabic, a motif that is centrally featured on the club's crest alongside a map of Sudan. The official colours are blue and white. The club's motto is "Allah – Al-Watan – Al-Hilal" (God – The Nation – Al-Hilal).

The team plays its home matches at Al-Hilal Stadium in Omdurman, commonly referred to as "The Blue Jewel". The stadium was originally inaugurated in 1965 and underwent a comprehensive renovation in 2018, expanding its capacity to 65,000 spectators. The club's wider infrastructure also includes departments for basketball, boxing, and swimming.

=== Rivalries ===
Al Hilal's primary traditional rival is Al-Merreikh, also based in Omdurman. The fixture between the two clubs is known as the Omdurman Derby and is the most prominent football rivalry in Sudan, strictly dividing the country's fan base.

In continental competitions, Al Hilal frequently encounters North and Central African teams such as Al Ahly, ES Tunis, and TP Mazembe. Matches against Al Ahly in the CAF Champions League have occasionally resulted in crowd disturbances and diplomatic tension between Egyptian and Sudanese supporters, leading to formal disciplinary interventions and fines applied by CAF.

== Captain history ==
- (United Kingdom) Amin Babeker
- (United Kingdom) Muhamed Hussein Sharfi
- (United Kingdom) Hasan Mabrouk
- (United Kingdom) Abdelaal Hussein
- (United Kingdom) Hashem Deifallah
- (United Kingdom) Saleh Rajab
- (United Kingdom) Yousef Abdelaziz
- (United Kingdom) Awad Ahmed
- (United Kingdom) Muhamed Talaat Fareed
- (United Kingdom) Alnour Balla
- (United Kingdom) Abdelkheir Saleh
- (Sudan) Zaki Saleh
- (Sudan) Siddiq Manzul
- (Sudan) Osman Al-Deim (1963–1964)
- (Sudan) Sabit Dudu (1964–1967)
- (Sudan) Ebrahim Yahia Al-Kawarti (1967–1970)
- (Sudan) Amin Zaki (1970–1971)
- (Sudan) Muhieldin Al-Deim (1971–1974)
- (Sudan) Nasr El-Din Abbas (1974–1977)
- (Sudan) Ali Gagarin (1977–1980)
- (Sudan) Ezzeldin Al-Dehish (1978–1981)
- (Sudan) Abdallah Musa (1980)
- (Sudan) Gasem Ahmed Osman (1981)
- (Sudan) Mustafa Al-Nager (1982–1986)
- (Sudan) Mustafa Seimawi (1986)
- (Sudan) Tareg Ahmed Adam (1987–1993)
- (Sudan) Mansour Tenga (1993–1996)
- (Sudan) Jamal Al-Thaalab (1996–1997)
- (Sudan) Akef Ataa (1998)
- (Sudan) Mustafa Komi (1999)
- (Sudan) Muhamed Hamdan (2000–2001)
- (Sudan) Hemed Kamal (2002–2003)
- (Sudan) Haitham Mustafa (2004–2012)
- (Sudan) Omer Bakhit (2013–2014)
- (Sudan) Seif Mesawi (2015–2016)
- (Sudan) Mudather Karika (2017–2018)
- (Sudan) Mohamed Ahmed Bashir (2018–2019)
- (Sudan) Abdellatif Boya (2019–2021)
- (Sudan) Muhamed Abdelrahman (2022–present)

== Players ==
As of 22 October 2026

Note: Flags indicate national team as defined under FIFA eligibility rules; some limited exceptions apply. Players may hold more than one non-FIFA nationality.

No.	Pos.	Nation	Player
1	GK	BFA	Farid Ouédraogo
2	DF	SDN	Yaser Awad
3	DF	GHA	Mamudu Kamaradin
4	DF	SDN	Altayeb Abdelrazeg (3rd Captain)
5	DF	SDN	Mazen Bashir
6	DF	SDN	Muhamed Ering (5th Captain)
7	FW	GAM	Ansumana Samura
8	MF	SDN	Abdel Raouf ( Vice-Captain)
9	FW	SDN	Yaser Muzmel (7th Captain)
10	FW	SDN	Muhamed Abdelrahman (Captain)
11	FW	MLI	Adama Coulibaly
12	DF	COD	Ernest Luzolo
13	DF	GAM	Omar Tamba
14	MF	NAM	Aprocius Petrus
15	MF	SDN	Salah Adel (4th Captain)
16	GK	SDN	Muhamed Madani
17	FW	NGR	Taiwo Akire
18	MF	SEN	Madicke Kane
19	DF	SDN	Mustafa Karshoum
20	DF	BFA	Bema Sanogo

No.	Pos.	Nation	Player
21	MF	SDN	Walieldin Khedr (6th Captain)
22	MF	MLI	Haman Mandjan
23	FW	MTN	Ahmed M'Bareck
24	DF	COD	Steven Ebuela
25	MF	SDN	Musab Kurduman
26	MF	NGR	Mohammed Rawa
27	FW	SDN	Musa Kanti
28	MF	NGR	Godwin Frimpong
29	DF	MLI	Babe Diarra
30	MF	GHA	Salim Adams
31	FW	NGR	Sunday Adetunji
32	FW	SDN	Mazen Fadl
33	GK	SDN	Muhamed Mustafa
34	FW	LBR	Emmanuel Flomo
36	FW	SDN	Amjed Esam
37	MF	BFA	Abdel Kabore
38	FW	CMR	Ivan Nana
39	FW	MTN	Ahmed Moctar

=== Out on loan ===
Note: Flags indicate national team as defined under FIFA eligibility rules; some limited exceptions apply. Players may hold more than one non-FIFA nationality.

No.	Pos.	Nation	Player
—	FW	LBR	Richmond Bleh (on loan) Discoveries SA FC (Until 30 June 2027)

== Honours ==
Al-Hilal SC Honours
Type	competition	titles	seasons
Domestic (SFA)	Sudan League / Sudan Premier League	32	1965, 1966, 1969, 1973, 1981, 1983, 1984, 1986, 1987, 1989, 1991, 1994, 1995, 1996, 1998, 1999, 2003, 2004, 2005, 2006, 2007, 2009, 2010, 2012, 2014, 2016, 2017, 2020–21, 2021–22, 2023–24, 2024–25, 2025-25
Domestic (SFA)	Sudan Cup	10	1954, 1998, 2000, 2002, 2004, 2009, 2011, 2016, 2021–22, 2024–25
Domestic (SFA)	Khartoum League	16	1953, 1955, 1958, 1959, 1960, 1961, 1963, 1965, 1967, 1969, 1971, 1973, 1982, 1984, 1990, 1994

== Performance in CAF competitions ==
- CAF Champions League 40 Appearances (Record)

- 1966 - Semi-finals
- 1967 - First round
- 1970 - Second round
- 1974 - Second round
- 1982 - Second round
- 1984 - First round
- 1985 - Second round
- 1987 - Finalist
- 1988 - Quarter-finals
- 1990 - Quarter-finals
- 1992 - Finalist
- 1995 - First round
- 1996 - First round
- 1997 - Second round
- 1999 - Second round
- 2000 - First round
- 2004 - Second round
- 2005 - First round
- 2006 - Second round
- 2007 - Semi-finals
- 2008 - Group stage
- 2009 - Semi-finals
- 2010 - Second round
- 2011 - Semi-finals
- 2012 - Second round
- 2013 - First round
- 2014 - Group stage
- 2015 - Semi-finals
- 2016 - First round
- 2017 - Group stage
- 2018 - First round
- 2018-19 - First round
- 2019-20 - Group stage
- 2020-21 - Group stage
- 2021-22 - Group stage
- 2022-23 - Group stage
- 2023-24 - Group stage
- 2024-25 - Quarter-finals
- 2025-26 - Quarter-finals
- 2026-27 -

- CAF Confederation Cup 6 Appearances
- 2004 - Group stage
- 2006 - Play-off round
- 2010 - Semi-finals
- 2012 - Semi-finals
- 2018 - Group stage
- 2018-19 - Quarter-finals
- African Cup Winners' Cup 4 Appearances
- 1978 - First round
- 1994 - First round
- 2001 - First round
- 2003 - Second round
- CAF Cup 2 Appearances
- 1998 - Quarter-finals
- 2002 - First round

== Performance in Arab competitions ==
- Arab Champions League 11 Appearances
- 1993 - Group stage
- 1995 - Group stage
- 1996 - Group stage
- 1999 - Preliminary round
- 2000 - Group stage
- 2003-04 - First round
- 2005-06 - Semi-finals
- 2007-08 -First round
- 2008-09 - Second round
- 2019-20 - First round
- 2023 - Second round
- Arab Cup Winners' Cup 2 Appearances
- 1989 - Semi-finals
- 2001 - Finalist

== Performance in CECAFA competitions ==
- CECAFA Clubs Cup 11 Appearances
- 1985 - Group stage
- 1987 - Group stage
- 1988 - 3rd Place
- 1989 - Group stage
- 1992 - Semi Final
- 1994 - Semi-finals
- 1996 - Group stage
- 1999 - Quarter-finals
- 2024 - 3rd Place
- 2025 - Finalist
- 2026 - 3rd Place
