= Al Hilal ESC (Al-Fasher) =

Sudanese football club

Al-Hilal Al-Fasher
- Full name: Al-Hilal Educational Sport Club
- Founded: 1948
- Ground: Al-Fasher Stadium; Al-Fasher, North Darfur, Sudan
- Capacity: 10,000
- President: Abdurazzag Habiballa
- Manager: Tarek Abdelbassit
- League: Sudan Premier League
- 2021–22: 5rd

Al-Hilal Educational Sport Club (Arabic: نادي الهلال للتربية البدنية) also known as Hilal Al-Fasher is a football club from Al-Fasher, Sudan. They play in the top level of Sudanese professional football, the Sudan Premier League.

== Stadium ==
Their home stadium is Al-Fasher Stadium. It has a capacity of 10,000.
