= Sudan national football team =

Men's association football team

Sudan
- Nickname: Falcons of Jediane (Arabic: صقور الجديان)
- Association: Sudan Football Association (SFA)
- Confederation: CAF (Africa)
- Sub-confederation: CECAFA (East & Central Africa)
- Head coach: James Kwesi Appiah
- Captain: Bakhit Khamis
- Most caps: Haitham Mustafa (98)
- Top scorer: Nasr Eddin Abbas (27)
- Home stadium: Khartoum Stadium
- FIFA code: SDN
First colours	Second colours

FIFA ranking
- Current: 118 ▼1 (7 October 2026)
- Highest: 74 (December 1996)
- Lowest: 164 (July 2017)

First international
- Sudan 5–1 Ethiopia (Omdurman, Sudan; 13 May 1956)

Biggest win
- Sudan 15–0 Muscat and Oman (Cairo, Egypt; 2 September 1965)

Biggest defeat
- South Korea 8–0 Sudan (Seoul, South Korea; 8 September 1979)

Africa Cup of Nations
- Appearances: 10 (first in 1957)
- Best result: Champions (1970)

African Nations Championship
- Appearances: 4 (first in 2011)
- Best result: Third place (2011, 2018)

Arab Cup
- Appearances: 5 (first in 1998)
- Best result: Group stage (1998, 2002, 2012, 2021, 2025)

CECAFA Cup
- Appearances: 22 (first in 1979)
- Best result: Champions (1980, 2006, 2007)

The Sudan national football team (Arabic: مُنْتَخَب السُّودَان لِكُرَّةُ الْقَدَم, romanized: muntaḵab as-sūdān al-waṭaniyy likurratu l-qadam) represents Sudan in international football and is controlled by the Sudan Football Association, the governing body for football in Sudan. Its home ground is Khartoum Stadium in the capital Khartoum.

In 1957, it was one of the three teams to participate in the inaugural Africa Cup of Nations, the other two being Egypt and Ethiopia. They won the 1970 Africa Cup of Nations as hosts.

== History ==
=== Beginning and an African giant (1946–1970) ===
The Sudan Football Association was founded in 1936 and thus it became one of the oldest football associations to exist in Africa. However, before the foundation of the Football Association, Sudan had started experiencing football brought to the country by the British colonizers since early 20th century via Egypt. Other Sudanese clubs founded at that time include Al-Hilal Omdurman, Al-Merrikh, which led to popularization of football in the country. The Khartoum League became the first national league to be played in Sudan, laying ground for the future development of Sudanese football.

Being experienced early with football, Sudan was quick to affiliate itself with FIFA in 1948, and soon after, Sudanese officials were instrumental, along with Ethiopian, South African and Egyptian counterparts, forming the Confederation of African Football in the Sudanese capital of Khartoum in 1957. Following the establishment of CAF, Sudan participated in the 1957 African Cup of Nations, the first historic Africa Cup of Nations which Sudan was host. The national team finished third, as South Africa was banned over apartheid.

During that early era, Sudan produced some of the finest players, most notably Mustafa Azhari, the captain of Sudan during this period; Nasr El-Din Abbas, who became Sudan's top scorer in the country's football team; Siddiq Manzul, who was an instrumental leader in Sudan's forward; Ali Gagarin with his meteoric ability. Sudan then won the 1970 African Cup of Nations, their only African trophy up to date.

=== Decline (1970–2008) ===
With the retirement of a significant number of Sudanese football star at the time, the national team of Sudan deteriorated. Sudan participated in 1972 and 1976 editions, but Sudan wasn't able to get out of the group stage. At the time, Sudan was plagued by the first and second civil wars that led to football in the country being largely unable to retain its status. Likewise, Sudan also suffered from series of political upheavals that drained the country's football resources. As such, Sudan struggled to qualify for another AFCON, and the country has yet to qualify for a single FIFA World Cup. Only Libya being the other major Arab country in Africa to have never achieved the feat. Often Sudan participated in AFCON qualification and majority finished in bottom or near bottom of their qualification. This was totally contrasted to their successes in club competition, as Sudanese clubs were omnipresent in CAF Champions League.

=== Small resurgence (2008–2012) ===
On 9 September 2007, Sudan beat World Cup participant Tunisia 3–2 at home, making Sudan the top finisher in the 2008 Africa Cup of Nations qualification Group 4. This meant Sudan had finally returned to the AFCON after 32 years. In the 2008 Africa Cup of Nations, their first in 32 years, Sudan was grouped in group C, which they shared with Egypt, Cameroon and Zambia. Sudan lost all three competitive games finishing at the bottom of their group.

Sudan reached the final round of the 2010 World Cup qualifiers but finished last with only a point, failing to reach AFCON and World Cup.

Sudan (as hosts) automatically qualified for the 2011 African Nations Championship. They finished top of their group which consisted of Algeria, Uganda and Gabon to then advance to the knockout stages. After defeating Niger on penalties in the quarterfinals, they lost against Angola in the semifinals (also on penalties) to then win 1–0 against former groupmates Algeria (who also lost on penalties in the semifinals) and finish third in the Championship, their first top 4 finish in a major African tournament since 1970.

In the 2012 Africa Cup of Nations qualification, Sudan was once again in the same group with Ghana, alongside Swaziland and Congo. Sudan lost only one game and reached the tournament In the 2012 Africa Cup of Nations, in group B, Sudan finished second behind Ivory Coast, and overcame Angola by goal difference to reach the knockout stage for the first time since 1970. Sudan played Zambia in the last eight, and lost 0–3. Zambia would go on to win the tournament for the first time.

=== Downfall (2012–2018) ===
In 2013 Africa Cup of Nations qualification, Sudan suffered a huge blow when they lost to neighbor Ethiopia by away goal, losing 0–2 in Addis Ababa after a very eventful 5–3 win at home, thus missed out the competition. Since then, Sudan continued to struggle qualifying for the African Cup of Nations for the next 7 years. They also had no success qualifying for the African Nations Championship after their 3rd-place finish in 2011 for a while until 2018.

=== Fluctuation (2018–present) ===
In 2018 they qualified for the 2018 African Nations Championship after failing to do so in two previous competitions and finished 3rd place, and it was seen as a signal heralding a new era of Sudanese football. Shortly after, with an almost identical crop of players, Sudan succeeded in qualifying for the 2021 Africa Cup of Nations, finishing ahead of powerhouse South Africa, including two famous wins at home against Ghana and South Africa and eliminated the South Africans in process, successfully returned to the AFCON after nine years. The optimism increased when Sudan beat Libya 1–0 in the qualification for the 2021 FIFA Arab Cup, under the same management of French coach Hubert Velud, making impressions that Sudan would soon recover its glorious place among Arab and African football nations.

However, Sudan had a disastrous opening during the 2022 FIFA World Cup qualification. Being drawn with the likes of a fellow Arab state and powerhouse Morocco, as well as Guinea-Bissau and Guinea which have never taken part in a World Cup like Sudan, the Sudanese were still being regarded as somewhat better than the two Guineas and could be a potential competitor against Morocco. Sudan started its quest with a 0–2 away to the Moroccans in Rabat, which was seen as acceptable. Yet in the home fixture against Guinea-Bissau, Sudan was completely trashed by the Bissau-Guineans 2–4, to leave the team in the bottom place and reducing hopes to qualify for a maiden World Cup. Sudan's hope was completely dashed after winning only two points after two consecutive draws over Guinea, effectively making Sudan the first team to be eliminated in the group.

Since the 2022 FIFA World Cup qualifiers, the Sudan national football team has experienced notable developments in international competitions.

In the 2026 FIFA World Cup qualification Sudan began their campaign strongly in June 2024, defeating South Sudan 3-0 in a Group B match. Key players like Yasir Mozamil Mohamed and Mohamed Abdel Raman contributed significantly to the victory. This result placed Sudan at the top of their group early in the qualifiers, with future games set against stronger teams like Senegal. Despite ongoing civil conflict forcing them to play matches abroad, Sudan secured a spot in the 2025 AFCON. They finished second in their group behind Angola, with crucial performances in October and November 2024. A notable achievement was their draw against Angola, which cemented their qualification. This success highlighted their resilience and ability to compete under challenging circumstances. They continued their notable campaign by solidifying their place at the top of the group table in the 2026 World Cup qualifiers for the first five matchdays and the majority of the sixth matchday, albeit slipping out of the qualification spots after conceding a goal in the final minute of stoppage time to tie their game 1-1 against South Sudan. After some losses and a draw to Mauritania, Sudan failed to qualify for the World Cup.

== Kit supplier ==
Since 2023, AB Sport has been the kit supplier of the national team.

== Results and fixtures ==
The following is a list of match results in the last 12 months, as well as any future matches that have been scheduled.

Win Draw Loss Fixture

=== 2025 ===
14 November Friendly	Oman	2–0	Sudan	Seeb, Oman
20:00 UTC+4	Al-Aghbari 64'; Al-Alawi 79'	Report		Stadium: Al-Seeb Stadium; Referee: Mahmoud Al Sawalmeh (Jordan)

26 November 2025 FIFA Arab Cup qualification	Sudan	2–1	Lebanon	Al Rayyan, Qatar
19:00 UTC+3	M. Haidar 43' (o.g.); Awad 74'	Report	Khamis 30'	Stadium: Al Gharafa Stadium; Attendance: 20,816; Referee: Abdulrahman Al-Jassim (Qatar)

3 December 2025 Arab Cup GS	Algeria	0–0	Sudan	Al Rayyan, Qatar
15:00	Ounas (yellow card) 40' (yellow-red card) 45+4'	Report		Stadium: Ahmad bin Ali Stadium; Attendance: 37,143; Referee: Amin Mohamed Omar (Egypt)

6 December 2025 Arab Cup GS	Sudan	0–2	Iraq	Doha, Qatar
19:00		Report	M. Ali 81'; Attwan 84'	Stadium: Stadium 974; Attendance: 38,639; Referee: Adham Makhadmeh (Jordan)

9 December 2025 FIFA Arab Cup	Bahrain	3–1	Sudan	Al Rayyan, Qatar
20:00 UTC+3	Abduljabbar 37'; Al-Romaihi 79' (pen.); Al-Humaidan 89'	Report	M. Ahmed (yellow card) 21' (red card) 58'; Muzamel 72'	Stadium: Education City Stadium; Attendance: 21,386; Referee: Juan Gabriel Benítez (Paraguay)

24 December 2025 AFCON GS	Algeria	3–0	Sudan	Rabat, Morocco
16:00 UTC+1	Mahrez 2', 61'; Maza 85'	Report	Adil (yellow card) 14' (yellow-red card) 39'	Stadium: Moulay Hassan Stadium; Attendance: 16,115; Referee: Pierre Atcho (Gabon)

28 December 2025 AFCON GS	Equatorial Guinea	0–1	Sudan	Casablanca, Morocco
16:00 UTC+1		Report	Coco 74' (o.g.)	Stadium: Mohammed V Stadium; Attendance: 8,671; Referee: Messie Nkounkou (Congo)

31 December 2025 AFCON GS	Sudan	0–2	Burkina Faso	Casablanca, Morocco
17:00 UTC+1		Report	L. Traoré 16'; Kouassi 85'	Stadium: Mohammed V Stadium; Attendance: 10,084; Referee: Amin Mohamed Omar (Egypt)

=== 2026 ===
3 January 2025 AFCON R16	Senegal	3–1	Sudan	Tangier, Morocco
17:00 UTC+1	P. Gueye 29', 45+3'; Mbaye 77'	Report	Aamir Abdallah 6'	Stadium: Tangier Grand Stadium; Attendance: 71,045; Referee: Dahane Beida (Mauritania)

21 May Friendly	Qatar	Cancelled	Sudan	Doha, Qatar
18:30 UTC+3		Report		Stadium: Abdullah bin Khalifa Stadium
Note: Cancelled as several players in the Sudan team contracted jaundice upon their arrival in Qatar.

29 May Friendly	Lebanon	Cancelled	Sudan	Doha, Qatar
18:30 UTC+3		Report		Stadium: Abdullah bin Khalifa Stadium
Note: Cancelled as several players in the Sudan team contracted jaundice upon their arrival in Qatar.

25 September 2027 AFCON qualification	Sudan	1–0	Ethiopia	Juba, South Sudan
18:00 UTC+0	Eisa 86' (pen.)	Report		Stadium: Juba Stadium; Referee: Willy Stéphane Ngah (Cameroon)

29 September 2027 AFCON qualification	Mozambique	4–1	Sudan	Maputo, Mozambique
15:00 UTC+0	Witi 24'; Chamito 46', 62'; Guima 58'	Report	Hamed 88' (pen.)	Stadium: Estádio Nacional do Zimpeto; Referee: Sulaiman Santio Kamara (Sierra Leone)

12 November 2027 AFCON qualification	Senegal	4–1	Sudan	Dakar, Senegal
20:00 UTC+0	Jackson 31'; Dia 61'; Mbaye 64'; Mboup 86'	Report	Abdalla 45'	Stadium: Leopold Sédar Senghor Stadium; Referee: Abongile Tom (South Africa)

16 November 2027 AFCON qualification	Sudan	2–4	Senegal	Juba, South Sudan
14:00 UTC+1	Nouh 52'; Adel 75'	Report	Jackson 4'; Diouf 22'; Mboup 87'; Mendy 90+1'	Stadium: Juba Stadium; Referee: Hillary Hambaba (Zambia)

=== 2027 ===
24 March 2027 AFCON qualification	Ethiopia	v	Sudan	TBD, Ethiopia
TBD				Stadium: TBD

28 March 2027 AFCON qualification	Sudan	v	Mozambique	TBD, Sudan
TBD				Stadium: TBD

== Coaching history ==
- (Sudan) Saleh Rajab (1956)
- (Hungary) Jozsef Hada (1957 – 1959)
- (Bulgaria) Lozan Kotsev (1959 – 1964)
- (Czechoslovakia) Jiří Starosta (1964 – 1968)
- (Sudan) Muhamed Hassan Kheiri (1968 – 1970)
- (Sudan) Abdel Fatah Hemed (1970 – 1974)
- (Socialist Federal Republic of Yugoslavia) Ivan Yanko (1974 – 1976)
- (Sudan) Ebrahim Kabir (1976 – 1978)
- (West Germany) Burkhard Ziese (1978 – 1980)
- (Sudan) Amin Zaki (1980)
- (Sudan) Muhamed Abdeen (1980-1981)
- (Sudan) Sayed Saleem (1981 – 1996)
- (Sudan) Muhamed Mazda (1996, 2005 – 2008, 2010 – 2015, 2016)
- (Sudan) Nasreldin Jaksa (1996)
- (Sudan) Sharafeldin Musa (1998)
- (Sudan) Muhamed Mahmoud (1999)
- (Sudan) Fozi el-Mardi (2000)
- (Serbia and Montenegro) Zoran Đorđević (2000)
- (Sudan) Ahmed Babeker (2000 – 2002)
- (Poland) Wojciech Łazarek (2002 – 2004)
- (England) Stephen Constantine (2009 – 2010)
- (Sudan) Ahmed Babeker (2010, 2015)
- (Sudan) Hamdan Hemed (2016)
- (Croatia) Zdravko Logarušić (2017 – 2019)
- (Sudan) Khaled Bakhit (2020)
- (France) Hubert Velud (2020 – 2021)
- (Sudan) Burhan Tia (2021 – 2023)
- (Morocco) Ezzaki Badou (2023)
- (Morocco) Youssef Fertout (2023)
- (Ghana) James Kwesi Appiah (2023 – present)

== Players ==
=== Current squad ===
The following players were called up for the 2027 Africa Cup of Nations qualification Group J Matches against Senegal 12 and 16 November 2027

Caps and goals are correct as of 16 November 2026, after the match against Senegal.

No.	Pos.	Player	Date of birth (age)	Caps	Goals	Club
	GK	Muhamed Mustafa	19 February 1996 (age 30)	30	0	(Sudan Football Association) Al-Hilal SC
	GK	Muhamed Abdallah Kedyaba	23 June 1990 (age 36)	2	0	(Sudan Football Association) Al-Ahli SC (Wad Madani)
	GK	Mustafa Eisa	11 January 2001 (age 25)	0	0	(Sudan Football Association) Hilal Alsahil SC
	DF	Mustafa Karshoum	6 December 1992 (age 33)	38	1	(Sudan Football Association) Al-Hilal
	DF	Ahmed Tabanja	2 September 2000 (age 26)	21	0	(Sudan Football Association) Al-Merrikh SC
	DF	Yaser Awad	15 March 2005 (age 21)	18	1	(Libyan Football Federation) Al-Hilal SC
	DF	Mazin Mohamedein	2 May 2000 (age 26)	14	0	(Sudan Football Association) Al Ta'awon SC
	DF	Abdelrahman Kuku	26 October 1998 (age 28)	13	0	(Kuwait Football Association) Al Nasr SC (Kuwait)
	DF	Muhamed Kesra	25 October 1996 (age 30)	9	0	(South Sudan Football Association) Jamus FC
	DF	Sheddy Barglan	3 October 2002 (age 24)	7	0	(Royal Dutch Football Association) FC Den Bosch
	DF	Musab Makeen	28 May 1996 (age 30)	7	0	(Libyan Football Federation) Al-Merrikh SC
	MF	Abuaagla Abdalla (Captain)	11 March 1993 (age 33)	69	2	(Libyan Football Federation) Al-Hilal SC (Benghazi)
	MF	Walieldin Khedr	15 September 1995 (age 31)	60	3	(Sudan Football Association) Al-Hilal
	MF	Abdel Raouf	18 July 1993 (age 33)	44	2	(Sudan Football Association) Al-Hilal
	MF	Salah Adel	3 April 1995 (age 31)	43	1	(Sudan Football Association) Al-Hilal SC
	MF	Ahmed Al-Tash	7 March 1993 (age 33)	21	3	(Libyan Football Federation) Al-Hilal SC (Benghazi)
	MF	Ammar Taifour	12 April 1997 (age 29)	20	0	Free
	MF	Alsamani Alsawi	31 October 1991 (age 35)	11	3	(Sudan Football Association) Al-Ahli SC (Wad Madani)
	MF	Muataz Hashem	17 October 1995 (age 31)	4	0	(Sudan Football Association) Al-Merrikh SC
	FW	Yaser Muzmel	1 January 1992 (age 34)	48	7	(Sudan Football Association) Al-Hilal
	FW	Al-Jezoli Nouh	24 October 2002 (age 24)	37	2	(Libyan Football Federation) Al-Hilal SC (Benghazi)
	FW	Musa Kanti	27 October 2002 (age 24)	22	3	(Sudan Football Association) Al-Hilal SC
	FW	Mohamed Eisa	12 July 1994 (age 32)	20	3	(United Arab Emirates Football Association) Al Bataeh Club
	FW	Abo Eisa	5 January 1996 (age 30)	14	1	Free
	FW	Aamir Abdallah	8 May 1999 (age 27)	7	1	Free
	FW	Amjed Esam	1 November 2003 (age 23)	0	0	(Sudan Football Association) Al-Hilal SC

=== Recent call-ups ===
The following players have been called up for Sudan in the last 12 months.

Pos.	Player	Date of birth (age)	Caps	Goals	Club	Latest call-up
Notes: ^{INJ} = Withdrew due to injury; ^{PRE} = Preliminary squad / standby; ^{RET} = Retired from the national team

== Records ==
As of 3 January 2026.
Players in bold are still active with Sudan.

=== Most appearances ===
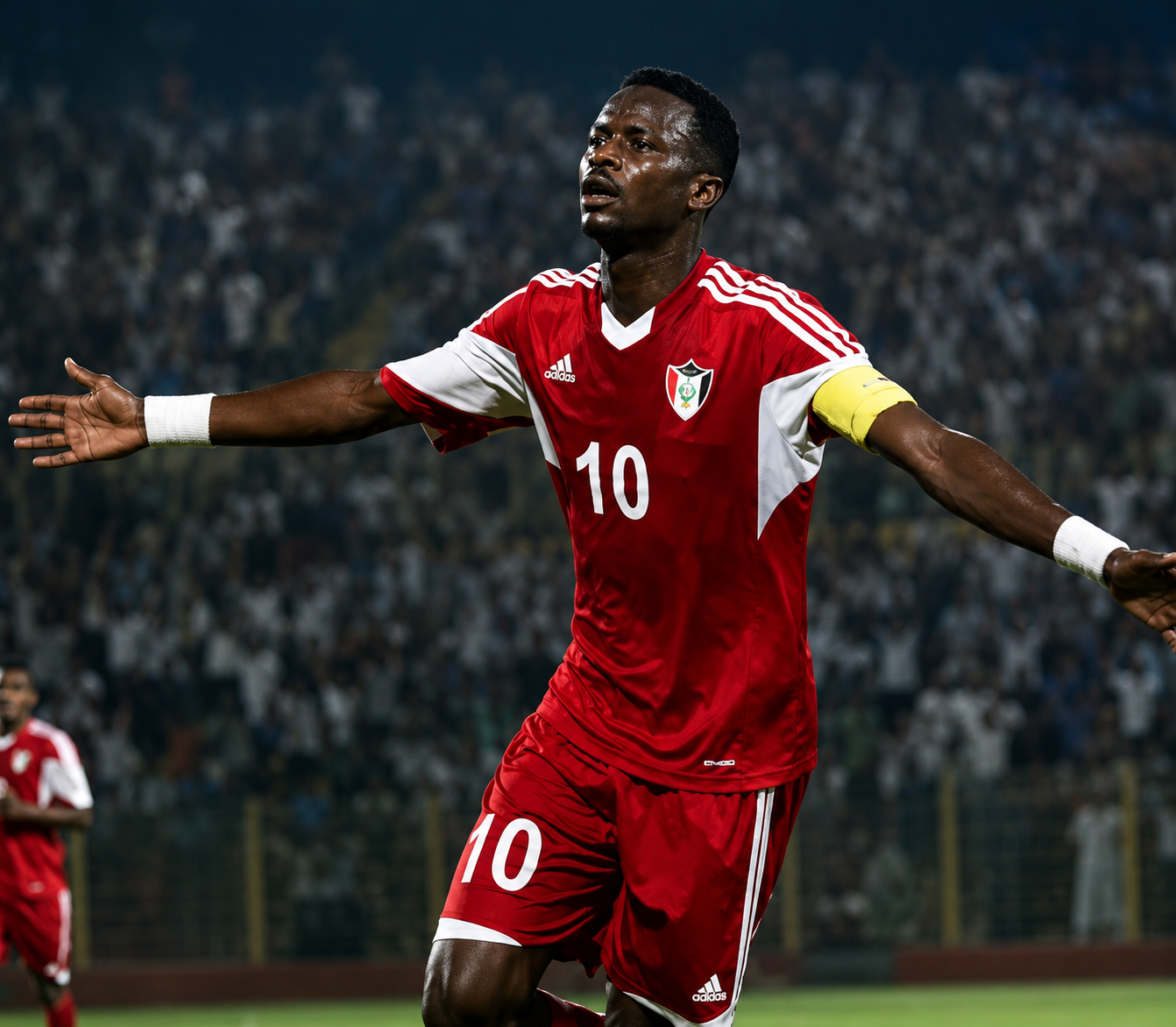
Muhannad El Taher celebrates after scoring a goal during Africa Cup of nations group qualifications match against Ivory Cost 2016

Rank	Player	Caps	Goals	Career
1	Haitham Mustafa	99	6	1998–2012
2	Muhannad El Tahir	90	15	2004–2018
3	Badreldin Galag	81	8	2002–2012
4	El Muez Mahgoub	78	0	2002–2015
5	Richard Justin	76	7	1999–2008
6	Nasr Eldin El Shigail	69	0	2007–2021
6	**Abuaagla Abdalla**	69	2	2015–present
8	**Ramadan Agab**	66	7	2010–present
9	Amir Kamal	63	2	2010–2025
10	Ala'a Eldin Yousif	62	5	2004–2014

=== Top goalscorers ===
Rank	Player	Goals	Caps	Ratio	Career
1	Nasr El-Din Abbas	27	52	0.52	1963–1972
2	Haytham Tambal	24	61	0.36	2003–2011
3	Ali Gagarin	18	33	0.55	1967–1979
3	Faisal Agab	18	47	0.38	1998–2012
5	**Muhamed Abdelrahman**	17	52	0.33	2017- present
6	Muhannad El Tahir	15	90	0.17	2004-2018
7	Hasabu El-Sagheir	11	29	0.38	1965–1972
8	**Seif Teiri**	10	44	0.23	2017- present
8	Mudather Karika	10	55	0.18	2007–2016
10	Abdelhameed Amarri	8	27	0.3	2004–2011
10	Badreldin Galag	8	81	0.1	2002–2012

== Competitive record ==
=== FIFA World Cup ===
FIFA World Cup record									Qualification record					
Year	Round	Position	Pld	W	D	L	GF	GA	Pld	W	D	L	GF	GA
1930 to 1938	Part of United Kingdom								Part of United Kingdom					
1950 and 1954	Did not enter								Did not enter					
(Sweden) 1958	Withdrew in qualification								2	1	1	0	2	1
(Chile) 1962	Withdrew								Withdrew					
(England) 1966	Withdrew								Withdrew					
(Mexico) 1970	Did not qualify								8	2	4	2	15	16
(West Germany) 1974	Did not qualify								2	1	0	1	1	2
(Argentina) 1978	Withdrew								Withdrew					
(Spain) 1982	Did not qualify								2	0	1	1	1	3
(Mexico) 1986	Did not qualify								4	0	3	1	1	5
(Italy) 1990	Did not qualify								2	0	1	1	1	2
(United States) 1994	Withdrew								Withdrew					
(France) 1998	Did not qualify								2	1	0	1	2	3
(South Korea) (Japan) 2002	Did not qualify								10	5	0	5	10	12
(Germany) 2006	Did not qualify								12	2	4	6	9	22
(South Africa) 2010	Did not qualify								12	3	1	8	11	18
(Brazil) 2014	Did not qualify								6	0	2	4	3	14
(Russia) 2018	Did not qualify								2	0	0	2	0	3
(Qatar) 2022	Did not qualify								8	1	4	3	8	13
(Canada) (Mexico) (United States) 2026	Did not qualify								10	3	4	3	8	6
(Morocco) (Portugal) (Spain) 2030	To be determined													
(Saudi Arabia) 2034	To be determined													
Total		0/19							82	19	25	38	72	120

=== Olympic Games ===
Olympic Games record
Appearances: 1
Year	Round	Position	Pld	W	D	L	GF	GA
1896 – 1956	Did not enter							
(Italy) 1960	Did not qualify							
(Japan) 1964	Did not qualify							
(Mexico) 1968	Did not qualify							
(West Germany) 1972	Group stage	15th	3	0	0	3	1	5
(Canada) 1976	Did not qualify							
(Soviet Union) 1980	Did not enter							
(United States) 1984	Did not qualify							
(South Korea) 1988	Did not qualify							
(Spain) 1992	Did not qualify							
(United States) 1996	Did not enter							
(Australia) 2000	Did not qualify							
(Greece) 2004	Did not qualify							
(China) 2008	Did not qualify							
(United Kingdom) 2012	Did not qualify							
(Brazil) 2016	Did not qualify							
(Japan) 2020	Did not qualify							
(France) 2024	Did not qualify							
Total	Group stage	1/28	3	0	0	3	1	5

- Football at the Summer Olympics has been an under-23 tournament since the 1992 edition.

=== Africa Cup of Nations ===
Africa Cup of Nations record									Qualification record					
Year	Round	Position	Pld	W	D	L	GF	GA	Pld	W	D	L	GF	GA
(Sudan) 1957	Third place	3rd	1	0	0	1	1	2	Qualified as hosts					
(United Arab Republic) 1959	Runners-up	2nd	2	1	0	1	2	2	No qualification					
(Ethiopia) 1962	Did not enter								Did not enter					
(Ghana) 1963	Runners-up	2nd	3	1	1	1	6	5	2	2	0	0	6	0
(Tunisia) 1965	Did not qualify								6	4	1	1	14	7
(Ethiopia) 1968	Did not qualify								3	1	0	2	4	5
(Sudan) 1970	Champions	1st	5	4	0	1	8	3	Qualified as hosts					
(Cameroon) 1972	Group stage	7th	3	0	2	1	4	6	Qualified as defending champions					
(Egypt) 1974	Did not qualify								2	0	1	1	2	3
(Ethiopia) 1976	Group stage	7th	3	0	2	1	3	4	4	3	0	1	7	4
(Ghana) 1978	Withdrew								Withdrew					
(Nigeria) 1980	Did not qualify								2	1	0	1	2	4
(Libya) 1982	Did not enter								Did not enter					
(Ivory Coast) 1984	Did not qualify								4	2	1	1	4	6
(Egypt) 1986	Withdrew								Withdrew					
(Morocco) 1988	Did not qualify								4	2	1	1	3	3
(Algeria) 1990	Did not qualify								2	1	0	1	1	1
(Senegal) 1992	Did not qualify								4	2	0	2	3	3
(Tunisia) 1994	Did not qualify								6	1	2	3	2	9
(South Africa) 1996	Did not qualify								10	3	2	5	10	14
(Burkina Faso) 1998	Withdrew								Withdrew					
(Ghana) (Nigeria) 2000	Did not enter								Did not enter					
(Mali) 2002	Did not qualify								8	2	1	5	9	10
(Tunisia) 2004	Did not qualify								6	3	1	2	9	6
(Egypt) 2006	Did not qualify								12	2	4	6	9	22
(Ghana) 2008	Group stage	16th	3	0	0	3	0	9	6	5	0	1	13	4
(Angola) 2010	Did not qualify								10	2	1	7	7	15
(Equatorial Guinea) (Gabon) 2012	Quarter-finals	8th	4	1	1	2	4	7	6	4	1	1	8	3
(South Africa) 2013	Did not qualify								2	1	0	1	5	5
(Equatorial Guinea) 2015	Did not qualify								6	1	0	5	3	11
(Gabon) 2017	Did not qualify								4	1	1	2	2	3
(Egypt) 2019	Did not qualify								6	1	0	5	5	13
(Cameroon) 2021	Group stage	21st	3	0	1	2	1	4	6	4	0	2	9	3
(Ivory Coast) 2023	Did not qualify								6	2	0	4	3	10
(Morocco) 2025	Round of 16	15th	4	1	0	3	2	8	6	2	2	2	4	6
(Kenya) (Tanzania) (Uganda) 2027	To be determined								To be determined					
(African Union) 2029	To be determined								To be determined					
Total	1 Title	10/35	31	8	7	16	31	50	133	52	19	62	144	170

=== African Games ===
African Games record
Appearances: 1
Year	Round	Position	Pld	W	D	L	GF	GA
(Republic of the Congo) 1965	Did not enter							
(Nigeria) 1973	Did not enter							
(Algeria) 1978	Did not enter							
(Kenya) 1987	Did not qualify							
(Egypt) 1991	Did not enter							
(Zimbabwe) 1995	Did not enter							
(South Africa) 1999	Did not enter							
(Nigeria) 2003	Withdrew							
(Algeria) 2007	Did not enter							
(Mozambique) 2011	Did not enter							
(Republic of the Congo) 2015	Group stage	5th	3	1	1	1	2	2
(Morocco) 2019	To be determined							
(Ghana) 2023	To be determined							
All Total	Group stage	1/11	3	1	1	1	2	2

- Prior to the Cairo 1991 campaign, the Football at the All-Africa Games was open to full senior national teams.

=== African Nations Championship ===
African Nations Championship record									Qualification record					
Year	Round	Position	Pld	W	D	L	GF	GA	Pld	W	D	L	GF	GA
(Ivory Coast) 2009	Did not qualify								4	1	1	2	7	6
(Sudan) 2011	Third place	3rd	6	4	1	1	5	2	Qualified as hosts					
(South Africa) 2014	Did not qualify								2	0	2	0	2	2
(Rwanda) 2016	Did not qualify								2	0	0	2	0	4
(Morocco) 2018	Third place	3rd	6	4	1	1	5	3	4	2	2	0	3	1
(Cameroon) 2020	Did not qualify								2	1	0	1	2	2
(Algeria) 2022	Group stage	12th	3	1	0	2	4	6	2	2	0	0	7	3
(Tanzania) (Kenya) (Uganda) 2024	Fourth place	4th	6	2	2	2	7	4	4	3	0	1	5	2
Total	Third place	4/7	21	11	4	6	21	15	20	9	5	6	26	20

=== CECAFA Cup ===
CECAFA Cup record
Appearances: 22
Year	Round	Position	Pld	W	D	L	GF	GA
(Uganda) 1973	Did not enter							
(Tanzania) 1974	Did not enter							
(Zambia) 1975	Did not enter							
(Zanzibar) 1976	Did not enter							
(Somalia) 1977	Did not enter							
(Malawi) 1978	Did not enter							
(Kenya) 1979	Group stage	6th	2	0	1	1	1	5
(Sudan) 1980	Champions	1st	4	3	0	1	5	2
(Tanzania) 1981	Group stage	7th	3	0	2	1	2	4
(Uganda) 1982	Group stage	6th	2	0	0	2	0	3
(Kenya) 1983	Group stage	5th	4	2	1	1	4	3
(Uganda) 1984	Did not enter							
(Zimbabwe) 1985	Did not enter							
(Ethiopia) 1987	Did not enter							
(Malawi) 1988	Did not enter							
(Kenya) 1989	Did not enter							
(Zanzibar) 1990	Runners-up	2nd	4	2	1	1	5	3
(Uganda) 1991	Fourth place	4th	4	0	1	3	3	9
(Tanzania) 1992	Did not enter							
(Kenya) 1994	Did not enter							
(Uganda) 1995	Did not enter							
(Sudan) 1996	Third place	3rd	4	1	2	1	6	6
(Rwanda) 1999	Quarter-finals	8th	3	0	2	1	1	4
(Uganda) 2000	Did not enter							
(Rwanda) 2001	Did not enter							
(Tanzania) 2002	Group stage	6th	4	1	1	2	4	5
(Sudan) 2003	Fourth place	4th	4	2	1	1	8	2
(Ethiopia) 2004	Third place	3rd	5	3	1	1	11	6
(Rwanda) 2005	Group stage	6th	4	2	0	2	7	12
(Ethiopia) 2006	Champions	1st	6	2	3	1	7	4
(Tanzania) 2007	Champions	1st	5	2	3	0	8	6
(Uganda) 2008	Group stage	6th	4	1	2	1	3	2
(Kenya) 2009	Did not enter							
(Tanzania) 2010	Group stage	10th	3	0	1	2	0	5
(Tanzania) 2011	Third place	3rd	6	3	3	0	6	3
(Uganda) 2012	Group stage	9th	3	1	0	2	1	3
(Kenya) 2013	Runners-up	2nd	6	4	0	2	8	4
(Ethiopia) 2015	Fourth place	4th	6	2	1	3	7	4
(Kenya) 2017	Did not enter							
(Uganda) 2019	Group stage	7th	3	0	2	1	2	3
Total	3 Titles	22/39	89	31	29	34	89	64

=== Arab Cup ===
FIFA Arab Cup record
Appearances: 5
Year	Round	Position	Pld	W	D	L	GF	GA
(Lebanon) 1963	Did not enter							
(Kuwait) 1964	Did not enter							
(Iraq) 1966	Did not enter							
(Saudi Arabia) 1985	Withdrew							
(Jordan) 1988	Did not enter							
(Syria) 1992	Did not enter							
(Qatar) 1998	Group stage	7th	2	1	0	1	2	4
(Kuwait) 2002	Group stage	7th	4	1	1	2	4	5
(Saudi Arabia) 2012	Group stage	7th	3	1	2	0	4	2
(Qatar) 2021	Group stage	16th	3	0	0	3	0	10
(Qatar) 2025	Group stage	15th	3	0	1	2	1	5
Total	Group stage	4/10	15	3	4	8	11	26

=== Arab Games ===
Arab Games record
Appearances: 3
Year	Round	Position	Pld	W	D	L	GF	GA
(Egypt) 1953	Did not enter							
(Lebanon) 1957	Did not enter							
(Morocco) 1961	Did not enter							
(United Arab Republic) 1965	Silver Medal	2nd	6	5	0	1	32	5
(Syria) 1976	Did not enter							
(Morocco) 1985	Did not enter							
(Syria) 1992	Did not enter							
(Lebanon) 1997	Did not enter							
(Jordan) 1999	Did not enter							
(Algeria) 2004	No tournament							
(Egypt) 2007	Group stage	5th	4	0	0	4	0	12
(Qatar) 2011	Group stage	5th	3	1	1	1	1	2
(Algeria) 2023	Bronze Medal	3rd	5	2	1	2	8	6
Total	Silver Medal	4/12	18	8	2	8	41	25

- Prior to the Algeria 2023 campaign, the Football at the Arab Games was open to full senior national teams.

== Honours ==
=== Continental ===
- Africa Cup of Nations
  - Champions (1): 1970
  - (silver) Runners-up (2): 1959, 1963
  - (bronze) Third place (1): 1957
- African Nations Championship
  - (bronze) Third place (2): 2011, 2018

=== Regional ===
- CECAFA Cup
  - (gold) Champions (3): 1980, 2006, 2007
  - (silver) Runners-up (2): 1990, 2013
  - (bronze) Third place (3): 1996, 2004, 2011
- Arab Games
  - (silver) Silver medal (1): 1965
  - (bronze) Bronze medal (1): 2023
- Palestine Cup of Nations
  - (bronze) Third place (1): 1975

=== Friendly ===
- Al-Jalaa Tournament (2): 1970, 1971
- LG Cup (1): 2011

=== Summary ===
Competition	1st place, gold medalist(s)	2nd place, silver medalist(s)	3rd place, bronze medalist(s)	Total
CAF African Cup of Nations	1	2	1	4
CAF African Nations Championship	0	0	2	2
Total	1	2	3	6

Preceded by 1968 Congo-Kinshasa	African Champions; 1970 (First title)	Succeeded by 1972 Congo
