= 2016 KPL Top 8 Cup =

Tournament details
- Country: Kenya
- Teams: 8

Final positions
- Champions: Muhoroni Youth (1st title)
- Runners-up: Gor Mahia

Tournament statistics
- Matches played: 9
- Goals scored: 18 (2 per match)
- Top goal scorer(s): Mark Makwata; Humphrey Mieno; Clifton Miheso; Jacques Tuyisenge; (2 goals each) (Note: Goals scored during penalty shoot-outs are not counted.)
- All statistics correct as of 16 October 2016.

The 2016 KPL Top 8 Cup was the fifth edition of the tournament, which kicked off on 1 May and ended on 16 October. It was contested by the top 8 teams of the 2015 season of the Kenyan Premier League: A.F.C. Leopards, Bandari, Gor Mahia, Muhoroni Youth, Sofapaka, Tusker, Ulinzi Stars and Ushuru.

Gor Mahia were the defending champions of the competition, having won their second title in the previous season after beating Sony Sugar 2–1 after extra time in the final played at the Moi Stadium in Kisumu. However, they were beaten in the final by winners Muhoroni Youth, who picked up their first title of the competition and KSh. 1,000,000/= in prize money.

== Format ==
The tournament follows a single-elimination format for the quarter-finals and the final, where the winning team immediately advances to the next round or wins the tournament, respectively.

For the semi-finals, the tournament adopts a double-elimination format, where a team must win two legs to advance to the final. If both teams are equal on aggregate goals at the end of the two legs, a penalty shoot-out will be conducted to determine who advances to the final. The away goals rule also applies in this round.

== 2015 Kenyan Premier League standings ==
Pos	Team	Pld	W	D	L	GF	GA	GD	Pts	Qualification or relegation
1	Gor Mahia (C, Q)	30	24	6	0	60	12	+48	78	Qualification for 2016 CAF Champions League (Note: The winners of the 2015 FKF President's Cup will qualify for the 2016 CAF Confederation Cup.)
2	Ulinzi Stars	30	17	7	6	41	25	+16	58	
3	Sofapaka	30	12	11	7	39	39	0	47	
4	Bandari	30	12	10	8	32	25	+7	46	
5	Tusker	30	12	8	10	46	28	+18	44	
6	Muhoroni Youth	30	11	11	8	31	36	−5	44	
7	A.F.C. Leopards	30	11	8	11	33	30	+3	41	
8	Ushuru	30	9	10	11	22	28	−6	37	
9	Mathare United	30	7	15	8	35	34	+1	36	
10	SoNy Sugar	30	9	8	13	23	26	−3	35	
11	Western Stima	30	9	8	13	25	31	−6	35	
12	Thika United	30	10	5	15	31	42	−11	35	
13	Chemelil Sugar	30	6	14	10	23	35	−12	32	
14	Nairobi City Stars	30	6	10	14	25	37	−12	28	
15	Kenya Commercial Bank (R)	30	6	8	16	34	48	−14	26	Relegation to 2016 National Super League
16	Nakuru AllStars (R)	30	4	11	15	34	58	−24	23	Relegation to 2016 National Super League

Updated to match(es) played on 1 November 2015. Source: Kenyan Premier League
Rules for classification: 1) points; 2) goal difference; 3) number of goals scored.
(C) Champions; (Q) Qualified for the phase indicated; (R) Relegated

== Bracket ==
Quarterfinals
Sofapaka	0
Muhoroni Youth	3
Ulinzi Stars	3
A.F.C. Leopards	2
Bandari	1
Tusker	2
Gor Mahia	1
Ushuru	0

Semifinals
Muhoroni Youth	0	1	1
Ulinzi Stars	0	1	1
Tusker	0	0	0
Gor Mahia	2	1	3

Finals
Muhoroni Youth	1
Gor Mahia	0

== Quarter-finals ==
The draw for the quarter-finals was held on 12 April.

=== Fixtures ===
The ties are scheduled to take place on 1–2 May.

1 May 2016	Bandari	1–2	Tusker	Madaraka Estate, Nairobi
14:00 UTC+3	Lavatsa 13'	Report	Mieno ?', 57'	Stadium: Nyayo National Stadium

1 May 2016	Ulinzi Stars	3–2	A.F.C. Leopards	Madaraka Estate, Nairobi
16:15 UTC+3	Makwata 6', 78'; Ochieng 90'	Report	Miheso 55', 60'	Stadium: Nyayo National Stadium

2 May 2016	Sofapaka	0–3	Muhoroni Youth	Madaraka Estate, Nairobi
14:00 UTC+3		Report	Ochieng 51'; Ochomo ?'; Arita ?'	Stadium: Nyayo National Stadium

2 May 2016	Gor Mahia	1–0	Ushuru	Madaraka Estate, Nairobi
16:15 UTC+3	Tuyisenge 61'	Report		Stadium: Nyayo National Stadium

== Semi-finals ==
The draw for the semi-finals was held on 2 May at the Nyayo National Stadium.

=== First leg ===
The first leg matches took place on 12 June.

12 June 2016	Muhoroni Youth	0–0	Ulinzi Stars	Madaraka Estate, Nairobi
14:00 UTC+3		Report		Stadium: Nyayo National Stadium

12 June 2016	Tusker	0–2	Gor Mahia	Madaraka Estate, Nairobi
16:15 UTC+3		Report	Tuyisenge 13'; Agwanda 33'	Stadium: Nyayo National Stadium

=== Second leg ===
The second leg matches will take place on 19 June.

19 June 2016	Ulinzi Stars	1–1	Muhoroni Youth	Madaraka Estate, Nairobi
14:00 UTC+3	Muloma 72'	Report	Hamisi 23'	Stadium: Nyayo National Stadium

1–1. Muhoroni Youth advance to the final on away goals rule.

19 June 2016	Gor Mahia	1–0	Tusker	Madaraka Estate, Nairobi
16:15 UTC+3	Kahata 45'	Report		Stadium: Nyayo National Stadium

Gor Mahia win 3–0 on aggregate.

== Final ==
The final took place on 16 October.

16 October 2016	Muhoroni Youth	1–0	Gor Mahia	Madaraka Estate, Nairobi
15:00 UTC+3	Rono 62'	Report		Stadium: Nyayo National Stadium

== Goalscorers ==
2 goals

- (Kenya) Mark Makwata (Ulinzi Stars)
- (Kenya) Humphrey Mieno (Tusker)
- (Kenya) Clifton Miheso (A.F.C. Leopards)
- (Rwanda) Jacques Tuyisenge (Gor Mahia)

1 goal

- (Kenya) Enock Agwanda (Gor Mahia)
- (Kenya) Moses Arita (Muhoroni Youth)
- (Kenya) Abdallah Hamisi (Muhoroni Youth)
- (Kenya) Francis Kahata (Gor Mahia)
- (Kenya) Edwin Lavatsa (Bandari)
- (Kenya) Churchill Muloma (Ulinzi Stars)
- (Kenya) Enosh Ochieng (Ulinzi Stars)
- (Kenya) Wellington Ochieng (Muhoroni Youth)
- (Kenya) Wycliffe Ochomo (Muhoroni Youth)
- (Kenya) Kennedy Rono (Muhoroni Youth)

== Team statistics ==
Pos.	Team	Pld	W	D	L	Pts	GF	GA	GD
1	Muhoroni Youth	4	2	2	0	8	5	1	+4
2	Gor Mahia	4	3	0	1	9	4	1	+3
**Eliminated in the semi-finals**
3	Ulinzi Stars	3	1	2	0	5	4	3	+1
4	Tusker	3	1	0	2	3	2	4	−2
**Eliminated in the quarter-finals**
5	A.F.C. Leopards	1	0	0	1	0	2	3	−1
6	Bandari	1	0	0	1	0	1	2	−1
7	Ushuru	1	0	0	1	0	0	1	−1
8	Sofapaka	1	0	0	1	0	0	3	−3
Total		8^{(1)}	6	2^{(2)}	6	22	17	17	0

Updated to games played on 16 October 2016. Team(s) rendered in italics represent(s) the host nation(s). The competition's winning team is rendered in bold.
^{(1)} – Total games lost not counted in total games played (total games lost = total games won)
^{(2)} – Total number of games drawn (tied) for all teams = Total number of games drawn (tied) ÷ 2 (both teams involved)
^{(3)} – As per statistical convention in football, matches decided in extra time are counted as wins and losses, while matches decided by penalty shoot-outs are counted as draws.
