= 2014 KPL Top 8 Cup =

Tournament details
- Country: Kenya
- Teams: 8

Final positions
- Champions: Tusker
- Runners-up: A.F.C. Leopards

Tournament statistics
- Matches played: 9
- Goals scored: 20 (2.22 per match)
- Top goal scorer(s): Jacob Keli; Rama Salim (2 goals) (Note: Goals scored during penalty shoot-outs are not counted.)
- All statistics correct as of 15 June 2014.

The 2014 KPL Top 8 Cup was the fourth edition of the tournament, which kicked off on 5 April and ended on 15 June. to be contested by the top 8 teams of the 2013 season of the Kenyan Premier League: A.F.C. Leopards, Bandari, Gor Mahia, Kenya Commercial Bank, Sofapaka, Thika United, Tusker and Ulinzi Stars.

Having won their first title the previous season, defending champions Tusker retained their title after beating A.F.C. Leopards 2–1 in the final played at the Kinoru Stadium in Meru.

== Competition format ==
The tournament follows a single-elimination format for the quarter-finals and the final, where the winning team immediately advances to the next round or wins the tournament, respectively.

For the semi-finals, the tournament adopts a double-elimination format, where a team must win two legs to advance to the final. If both teams are equal on aggregate goals at the end of the two legs, a penalty shoot-out will be conducted to determine who advances to the final. The away goals rule also applies in this round.

== 2013 Kenyan Premier League standings ==
Pos	Team	Pld	W	D	L	GF	GA	GD	Pts	Qualification or relegation
1	Gor Mahia (C, Q)	30	17	9	4	32	15	+17	60	Qualification for 2014 CAF Champions League
2	A.F.C. Leopards (Q)	30	14	8	8	39	25	+14	50	Qualification for 2014 CAF Confederation Cup (Note: A.F.C. Leopards qualified for the 2014 CAF Confederation Cup as winners of the 2013 FKF President's Cup.)
3	Sofapaka	30	13	11	6	35	22	+13	50	
4	Kenya Commercial Bank	30	11	14	5	40	22	+18	47	
5	Tusker	30	10	12	8	30	23	+7	42	
6	Bandari	30	10	12	8	30	28	+2	42	
7	Thika United	30	11	9	10	27	31	−4	42	
8	Ulinzi Stars	30	10	11	9	22	21	+1	41	
9	Chemelil Sugar	30	10	10	10	27	24	+3	40	
10	Muhoroni Youth	30	9	8	13	21	40	−19	35	
11	SoNy Sugar	30	7	13	10	19	28	−9	34	
12	Western Stima	30	6	14	10	23	25	−2	32	
13	Mathare United	30	5	17	8	24	27	−3	32	
14	Nairobi City Stars	30	7	11	12	24	36	−12	32	
15	Kakamega Homeboyz (R)	30	6	11	13	22	29	−7	29	Relegation to 2014 National Super League
16	Vegpro (R)	30	4	10	16	17	36	−19	22	Relegation to 2014 National Super League

Updated to match(es) played on 9 November 2013. Source: Kenyan Premier League
Rules for classification: 1) points; 2) goal difference; 3) number of goals scored.
(C) Champions; (Q) Qualified for the phase indicated; (R) Relegated

== Bracket ==
Quarterfinals
Sofapaka	1 (4)
Tusker	1 (5)
Gor Mahia	2
Thika United	1
A.F.C. Leopards	1
Bandari	0
K.C.B.	2
Ulinzi Stars	1

Semifinals
Tusker	1	1	2
Gor Mahia	0	1	1
A.F.C. Leopards	1	3	4
K.C.B.	1	0	1

Finals
Tusker	2
A.F.C. Leopards	1

== Quarter-finals ==
The draw for the quarter-finals was held on 26 March, and the ties scheduled for 5−6 and 19−20 April.

=== Fixtures ===
5 April 2014	A.F.C. Leopards	1 – 0	Bandari	Madaraka, Nairobi
15:00 UTC+3	Wamalwa (yellow card) 21'; Omar 90' (o.g.)	Report	Naftali (yellow card) 8'; Kitawi (yellow card) 79'; Majid (yellow card) 90'	Stadium: Nyayo National Stadium

6 April 2014	Sofapaka	1 – 1 (4 − 5 p)	Tusker	Madaraka, Nairobi
15:00 UTC+3	Kasolo (yellow card) 15'; Kago (yellow card) 25'; Mieno 45'	Report	Kimani 75'	Stadium: Nyayo National Stadium
	Penalties
	Mulumba (penalty scored); Miheso (penalty scored); Mieno (penalty scored); Ekaliani (penalty scored); Asike (penalty missed)		(penalty scored) S. Odhiambo; (penalty scored) I. Salim; (penalty scored) Osumba; (penalty scored) J. Were; (penalty scored) Atudo

19 April 2014	Kenya Commercial Bank	2 – 1	Ulinzi Stars	Machakos, Machakos
15:00 UTC+3	C. Odhiambo 26'; Kiongera (yellow card) 32' (goal) 89'; Muhando (yellow card) 45'	Report	Mureithi (yellow card) 43'; Mogire (yellow card) 45'; Ochieng (yellow card) 57'; Abulala (yellow card) 78' (goal) 90+1'	Stadium: Kenyatta Stadium

20 April 2014	Gor Mahia	2 – 1	Thika United	Machakos, Machakos
15:00 UTC+3	Sserunkuma 44' (yellow card) 59'; G. Odhiambo (yellow card) 49'; R. Salim 59'	Report	Mbugua (yellow card) 37'; D. Odhiambo 65'; Glay (yellow card) 88'	Stadium: Kenyatta Stadium

== Semi-finals ==
The draw for the semi-finals was held on 22 April.

=== First leg ===
The first leg ties of the semi-finals were played on 7 and 25 May.

==== Fixtures ====
7 May 2014	A.F.C. Leopards	1 – 1	Kenya Commercial Bank	Madaraka, Nairobi
16:00 UTC+3	Juma (yellow card) 36'; Imbalambala (yellow card) 59'; Mudde (red card) 71'; Keli 75'	Report	Idah (yellow card) 18' (yellow-red card) 40'; Murunga 24'; Kiongera (yellow card) 51'	Stadium: Nyayo National Stadium

25 May 2014	Tusker	1 – 0	Gor Mahia	Meru, Meru
15:00 UTC+3	Osumba 45'; Aucho (yellow card) 88'	Report	Shakava (yellow card) 38'; Kizito (yellow card) 85'	Stadium: Kinoru Stadium

=== Second leg ===
The second leg ties of the semi-finals were played on 4 and 11 June.

==== Fixtures ====
4 June 2014	Gor Mahia	1 – 1	Tusker	Madaraka, Nairobi
15:00 UTC+3	R. Salim 4'; Mohammed (yellow card) 82'; Kizito (yellow card) 84'	Report	Omar (yellow card) 40'; J. Were 54'; S. Odhiambo (yellow card) 90'	Stadium: Nyayo National Stadium

Tusker win 2–1 on aggregate.

11 June 2014	Kenya Commercial Bank	0 – 3	A.F.C. Leopards	Madaraka, Nairobi
16:00 UTC+3		Report	P. Were (yellow card) 3'; Ikenna 7'; Wanyama 40'; Keli 55'	Stadium: Nyayo National Stadium

A.F.C. Leopards win 4–1 on aggregate.

== Final ==
The final was played on 15 June.

15 June 2014	Tusker	2 – 1	A.F.C. Leopards	Meru, Meru
15:00 UTC+3	Wahome 11'; Mugalia (yellow card) 20'; Alwanga 76'	Report	Masika (yellow card) 27'; Situma (yellow card) 29'; Shikokoti 35'	Stadium: Kinoru Stadium

== Top scorers ==
Rank	Player	Club	Goals
1	(Kenya) Jacob Keli	A.F.C. Leopards	2
1	(Kenya) Rama Salim	Gor Mahia	2
2	(Kenya) Allan Abulala	Ulinzi Stars	1
2	(Kenya) Clifford Alwanga	Tusker	1
2	(Nigeria) Austin Ikenna	A.F.C. Leopards	1
2	(Kenya) Kevin Kimani	Tusker	1
2	(Kenya) Paul Kiongera	Kenya Commercial Bank	1
2	(Kenya) Humphrey Mieno	Sofapaka	1
2	(Kenya) Andrew Murunga	Kenya Commercial Bank	1
2	(Kenya) Chrispinus Odhiambo	Kenya Commercial Bank	1
2	(Kenya) Dennis Odhiambo	Thika United	1
2	(Kenya) Brian Osumba	Tusker	1
2	(Kenya) Joseph Shikokoti	A.F.C. Leopards	1
2	(Uganda) Dan Sserunkuma	Gor Mahia	1
2	(Kenya) Lloyd Wahome	Tusker	1
2	(Kenya) Bernard Wanyama	A.F.C. Leopards	1
2	(Kenya) Jesse Were	Tusker	1

== Team statistics ==
Pos.	Team	Pld	W	D	L	Pts	APts	GF	AGF	GA	AGA	GD	AGD	CS	ACS	YC	AYC	RC	ARC
1	Tusker	4	2	2	0	8	2.00	5	1.25	3	0.75	+2	0.50	1	0.25	4	1.00	0	0.00
2	A.F.C. Leopards	4	2	1	1	7	1.75	6	1.50	3	0.75	+3	0.75	2	0.50	5	1.25	1	0.25
**Eliminated in the semi-finals**
3	Gor Mahia	3	1	1	1	4	1.33	3	1.00	3	1.00	0	0.00	0	0.00	6	2.00	0	0.00
4	Kenya Commercial Bank	3	1	1	1	4	1.33	3	1.00	5	1.67	−2	−0.67	0	0.00	5	1.67	1	0.33
**Eliminated in the quarter-finals**
5	Sofapaka	1	0	1	0	1	1.00	1	1.00	1	1.00	0	0.00	0	0.00	2	2.00	0	0.00
6	Thika United	1	0	0	1	0	0.00	1	1.00	2	2.00	−1	−1.00	0	0.00	2	2.00	0	0.00
7	Ulinzi Stars	1	0	0	1	0	0.00	1	1.00	2	2.00	−1	−1.00	0	0.00	4	4.00	0	0.00
8	Bandari	1	0	0	1	0	0.00	0	0.00	1	1.00	−1	−1.00	0	0.00	3	3.00	0	0.00
Total		8^{(1)}	5	3^{(2)}	5	21	1.31	20	1.25	20	1.25	0	0.00	3	0.19	31	1.94	2	0.13

Updated to games played on 15 June 2014. Team(s) rendered in italics represent(s) the host nation(s). The competition's winning team is rendered in bold.
^{(1)} – Total games lost not counted in total games played (total games lost = total games won)
^{(2)} – Total number of games drawn (tied) for all teams = Total number of games drawn (tied) ÷ 2 (both teams involved)
^{(3)} – As per statistical convention in football, matches decided in extra time are counted as wins and losses, while matches decided by penalty shoot-outs are counted as draws.
