= 2015 KPL Top 8 Cup =

Tournament details
- Country: Kenya
- Teams: 8

Final positions
- Champions: Gor Mahia
- Runners-up: Sony Sugar

Tournament statistics
- Matches played: 9
- Goals scored: 33 (3.67 per match)
- Top goal scorer(s): Meddie Kagere (4 goals) (Note: Goals scored during penalty shoot-outs are not counted.)
- All statistics correct as of 7 November 2015.

The 2015 KPL Top 8 Cup was the fourth edition of the tournament, which kicked off on 26 September and ended on 7 November. It is set to be contested by the top 8 teams of the 2014 season of the Kenyan Premier League: A.F.C. Leopards, Chemelil Sugar, Gor Mahia, Muhoroni Youth, Sofapaka, Tusker and Ulinzi Stars. The winners of the tournament will receive KSh. 1,000,000/= in prize money.

Tusker were the defending champions of the competition, having won their second title in the previous season after beating A.F.C. Leopards 2–1 in the final played at the Kinoru Stadium in Meru. However, they were knocked out by eventual champions Gor Mahia in the semi-finals, beating Sony Sugar in the final after extra time to pick up their second title of the competition and their third title of the 2015 season.

== Competition format ==
The tournament follows a single-elimination format for the quarter-finals and the final, where the winning team immediately advances to the next round or wins the tournament, respectively.

For the semi-finals, the tournament adopts a double-elimination format, where a team must win two legs to advance to the final. If both teams are equal on aggregate goals at the end of the two legs, a penalty shoot-out will be conducted to determine who advances to the final. The away goals rule also applies in this round.

== 2014 Kenyan Premier League standings ==
Pos	Team	Pld	W	D	L	GF	GA	GD	Pts	Qualification or relegation
1	Gor Mahia (C)	30	17	9	4	43	21	+22	60	Qualification for 2015 CAF Champions League
2	Sofapaka	30	16	9	5	49	27	+22	57	Qualification for 2015 CAF Confederation Cup (Note: Sofapaka qualified for the 2015 CAF Confederation Cup as winners of the 2014 FKF President's Cup.)
3	Tusker	30	14	11	5	42	25	+17	53	
4	Ulinzi Stars	30	12	15	3	33	20	+13	51	
5	Chemelil Sugar	30	12	12	6	24	16	+8	48	
6	SoNy Sugar	30	9	14	7	27	21	+6	41 (Note: Sony Sugar were awarded 3 points and 2 goals after AFC Leopards failed to turn up for their match scheduled for 10 December.)	
7	A.F.C. Leopards	30	10	11	9	30	25	+5	41	
8	Muhoroni Youth	30	10	10	10	23	28	−5	40	
9	Thika United	30	9	12	9	31	31	0	39	
10	Mathare United	30	10	8	12	19	25	−6	38	
11	Western Stima	30	9	9	12	26	33	−7	36	
12	Ushuru	30	10	3	17	22	40	−18	33	
13	Bandari	30	5	15	10	23	29	−6	30	
14	Kenya Commercial Bank	30	7	8	15	30	39	−9	29	
15	Nairobi City Stars (R)	30	4	12	14	18	35	−17	24	Relegation to 2015 National Super League
16	Nakuru AllStars (R)	30	3	8	19	13	38	−25	17	Relegation to 2015 National Super League

Updated to match(es) played on 8 November 2014. Source: Kenyan Premier League
Rules for classification: 1) points; 2) goal difference; 3) number of goals scored.
(C) Champions; (R) Relegated

== Bracket ==
Quarterfinals
Sofapaka	2 (5)
Chemelil Sugar	2 (4)
Ulinzi Stars	1 (4)
Sony Sugar	1 (5)
Tusker	4
A.F.C. Leopards	2
Gor Mahia	3
Muhoroni Youth	0

Semifinals
Sofapaka	2	1	3
Sony Sugar	2	3	5
Tusker	2	1	3
Gor Mahia	2	2	4

Finals
Sony Sugar	1
Gor Mahia	2

== Quarter-finals ==
The draw for the quarter-finals was held on 4 September. Teams placed first to fourth on the league table were placed in one pot, while teams placed fifth to eighth were placed in another pot.

=== Fixtures ===
The matches are scheduled to take place on the weekend of 26–27 September.

26 September 2015	Sofapaka	2–2 (5–4 p)	Chemelil Sugar	Kisumu, Kisumu
13:45 UTC+3	Baraza 61'; Mbatiye 86'	Report	Olwande 29' (pen.); Karani 59'	Stadium: Moi Stadium
	Penalties
	Baraza (penalty scored); Ouma (penalty scored); Mulumba (penalty scored); Odipo (penalty scored); Ndayisenga (penalty missed); Mwaniki (penalty scored)		(penalty scored) Olwande; (penalty scored) Ouko; (penalty scored) Oyoo; (penalty scored) Mwaniki; (penalty missed) Wakhanya; (penalty missed) Mwinyi

26 September 2015	Gor Mahia	3–0	Muhoroni Youth	Kisumu, Kisumu
16:15 UTC+3	Kagere 60'; Olunga 69'; Odhiambo 87'	Report		Stadium: Moi Stadium

27 September 2015	Ulinzi Stars	1–1 (4–5 p)	Sony Sugar	Nakuru, Nakuru
14:00 UTC+3	Wamalwa 78'	Report	Chambiri 47'	Stadium: Afraha Stadium
	Penalties
	Wamalwa (penalty scored); Hassan (penalty missed); E. Ochieng (penalty scored); Omondi (penalty scored); F. Ochieng (penalty scored)		(penalty scored) Wanyama; (penalty scored) Ayugi; (penalty scored) Asembeka; (penalty scored) Bruno; (penalty scored) Omunuk

27 September 2015	Tusker	4–2	A.F.C. Leopards	Madaraka Estate, Nairobi
16:15 UTC+3	Asike 40'; Mieno 45'; Osumba 52'; Were 55'	Report	Diallo 26'; Kiiza 79'	Stadium: Nyayo National Stadium

== Semi-finals ==
The draw for the semi-finals was held on 27 September, after the final quarter-final between Tusker and A.F.C. Leopards.

=== First leg ===
The first leg matches took place on 17 October.

17 October 2015	Sony Sugar	2–2	Sofapaka	Nakuru, Nakuru
14:00 UTC+3	Odiaga 10'; Ademba 44'	Report	Ndolo 30'; Shivachi 45'	Stadium: Afraha Stadium

17 October 2015	Tusker	2–2	Gor Mahia	Nakuru, Nakuru
16:15 UTC+3	Were 53'; Asike 90+1'	Report	Abondo 11'; Kagere 37' (pen.)	Stadium: Afraha Stadium

=== Second leg ===
The second leg matches took place on 4 November.

4 November 2015	Sofapaka	1–3	Sony Sugar	Madaraka Estate, Nairobi
16:45 UTC+3	Mulumba 42'	Report	Monda 28'; Ssekayombya 38'; Shivachi 85' (o.g.)	Stadium: Nyayo National Stadium

Sony Sugar win 5–3 on aggregate.

4 November 2015	Gor Mahia	2–1	Tusker	Madaraka Estate, Nairobi
19:15 UTC+3	Olunga 53', 73'	Report	Kimani 9'	Stadium: Nyayo National Stadium

Gor Mahia win 4–3 on aggregate.

== Final ==
The final was played on 7 November.

7 November 2015	Sony Sugar	1–2 (a.e.t.)	Gor Mahia	Kisumu, Kisumu
15:00 UTC+3	Ssekayombya 9'	Report	Kagere 77', 114'	Stadium: Moi Stadium; Referee: Raymond Onyango

== Goalscorers ==
4 goals

- (Rwanda) Meddie Kagere (Gor Mahia)

3 goals

- (Kenya) Michael Olunga (Gor Mahia)

2 goals

- (Kenya) Eugene Asike (Tusker)
- (Uganda) Andrew Ssekayombya (Sony Sugar)
- (Kenya) Jesse Were (Tusker)

1 goal

- (Kenya) Ali Abondo (Gor Mahia)
- (Kenya) Victor Ademba (Sony Sugar)
- (Kenya) John Baraza (Sofapaka)
- (Kenya) Marwa Chambiri (Sony Sugar)
- (Ivory Coast) Lamine Diallo (A.F.C. Leopards)
- (Kenya) Meshack Karani (Chemelil Sugar)
- (Uganda) Martin Kiiza (A.F.C. Leopards)
- (Kenya) Kevin Kimani (Tusker)
- (Kenya) David Mbatiye (Sofapaka)
- (Kenya) Humphrey Mieno (Tusker)
- (Kenya) Justine Monda (Sony Sugar)
- (Democratic Republic of the Congo) Felly Mulumba (Sofapaka)
- (Kenya) Ekaliana Ndolo (Sofapaka)
- (Kenya) George Odhiambo (Gor Mahia)
- (Kenya) Byron Odiaga (Sony Sugar)
- (Kenya) Samuel Olwande (Chemelil Sugar)
- (Kenya) Brian Osumba (Tusker)
- (Kenya) Collins Shivachi (Sofapaka)
- (Kenya) Oscar Wamalwa (Ulinzi Stars)

1 own goal

- (Kenya) Collins Shivachi (Sofapaka; against Sony Sugar)

== Team statistics ==
Pos.	Team	Pld	W	D	L	Pts	GF	GA	GD
1	Gor Mahia	4	3	1	0	10	9	4	+5
2	Sony Sugar	4	1	2	1	5	7	6	+1
**Eliminated in the semi-finals**
3	Tusker	3	1	1	1	4	7	6	+1
4	Sofapaka	3	0	2	1	2	5	7	−2
**Eliminated in the quarter-finals**
5	Chemelil Sugar	1	0	1	0	1	2	2	0
6	Ulinzi Stars	1	0	1	0	1	1	1	0
7	A.F.C. Leopards	1	0	0	1	0	2	4	−2
8	Muhoroni Youth	1	0	0	1	0	0	3	−3
Total		9^{(1)}	5	4^{(2)}	5	23	33	33	0

Updated to games played on 7 November 2015. Team(s) rendered in italics represent(s) the host nation(s). The competition's winning team is rendered in bold.
^{(1)} – Total games lost not counted in total games played (total games lost = total games won)
^{(2)} – Total number of games drawn (tied) for all teams = Total number of games drawn (tied) ÷ 2 (both teams involved)
^{(3)} – As per statistical convention in football, matches decided in extra time are counted as wins and losses, while matches decided by penalty shoot-outs are counted as draws.
