= 2014 Kenyan Premier League =

Kenyan Premier League
- Season: 2014
- Champions: Gor Mahia; 2nd Premier League title; 14th Kenyan title overall
- Relegated: Nairobi City Stars; Top Fry AllStars
- Champ. League: Gor Mahia
- Confed. Cup: Sofapaka (cup winner)
- Top 8 Cup: Gor Mahia; Sofapaka; Tusker; Ulinzi Stars; Chemelil Sugar; Sony Sugar; A.F.C. Leopards; Muhoroni Youth
- Matches played: 240
- Goals scored: 453 (1.89 per match)
- Top goalscorer: Dan Sserunkuma (16 goals)
- Biggest home win: K.C.B. 4–0 Mathare United (26 July 2014)
- Biggest away win: Muhoroni Youth 1–5 Sofapaka (15 February 2014)
- Highest scoring: Muhoroni Youth 1–5 Sofapaka (15 February 2014)
- All statistics correct as of 8 November 2014.

The 2014 Kenyan Premier League (known as the Tusker Premier League for sponsorship reasons) was the eleventh season of the Kenyan Premier League since it began in 2003. It was also the 51st season of top division football in Kenya since 1963. Gor Mahia won the league title for the second consecutive season, earning a place in the preliminary round of the 2015 CAF Champions League while 2014 FKF President's Cup champions Sofapaka represented Kenya in the preliminary round of the 2014 CAF Confederation Cup. The two teams faced each other at the 2015 Kenyan Super Cup.

A total of 16 teams competed for the league, with fourteen returning from the 2013 season and the promotion play-off winners of FKF Division One, which has since become the third tier of the Kenyan football league system after the introduction of the National Super League on 10 July 2013.

== Changes from last season ==
Locations of the 2014 Kenyan Premier League teams.
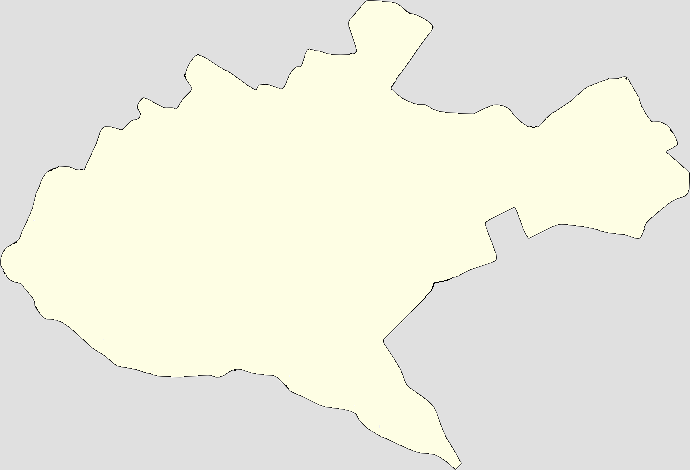
Locations of the 2014 Kenyan Premier League teams within Nairobi.

Relegated from Premier League

- Kakamega Homeboyz
- Karuturi Sports

Promoted from Division One

- Kenya Revenue Authority
- Top Fry AllStars

== Teams ==
Half of the 16 participating teams are based in the capital, Nairobi, while Bandari is the only team based at the Coast.

=== Stadia and locations ===
Team	Location	Stadium	Capacity
A.F.C. Leopards	Nairobi	Nyayo National Stadium	30,000
Bandari	Mombasa	Mombasa Municipal Stadium	10,000
Chemelil Sugar	Chemelil	Chemelil Sports Complex	5,000
Gor Mahia	Nairobi	Nairobi City Stadium	15,000
K.C.B.	Nairobi	Nairobi City Stadium	15,000
Mathare United	Nairobi	Kasarani Stadium	60,000
Muhoroni Youth	Muhoroni	Muhoroni Stadium	5,000
Nairobi City Stars	Nairobi	Hope Centre	5,000
Sofapaka	Nairobi	Nyayo National Stadium	30,000
Sony Sugar	Awendo	Green Stadium	5,000
Thika United	Thika	Thika Municipal Stadium	5,000
Top Fry AllStars	Nakuru	Afraha Stadium	8,200
Tusker	Nairobi	Kasarani Stadium	60,000
Ulinzi Stars	Nakuru	Afraha Stadium	8,200
Ushuru	Nairobi	Public Service Grounds	Unknown
Western Stima	Kakamega	Bukhungu Stadium	5,000

=== Head coaches ===
As of 18 July 2014.

Team	Head coach
A.F.C. Leopards	(Netherlands) Hendrik Pieter de Jongh
Bandari	(Kenya) Twahir Muhiddin
Chemelil Sugar	(Kenya) Mike Muiruri
Gor Mahia	(Scotland) Bobby Williamson
Kenya Commercial Bank	(Kenya) Rishadi Shedu
K.R.A.	(Kenya) Ken Kenyatta
Mathare United	(Kenya) Stanley Okumbi
Muhoroni Youth	(Kenya) Francis Baraza
Nairobi City Stars	(England) Tim Bryett
Sofapaka	(Uganda) Sam Timbe
Sony Sugar	(Kenya) Zedekiah Otieno
Thika United	(Kenya) John Kamau
Top Fry AllStars	(Kenya) Peter Okidi
Tusker	(Kenya) Francis Kimanzi
Ulinzi Stars	(Kenya) Robert Matano
Western Stima	(Kenya) Henry Omino

== Hooliganism ==
On 11 May 2014, the match between Thika United and A.F.C. Leopards was the season's first to be abandoned after fans of the latter invaded the pitch in the 85th minute, frustrated by their team's failure to get on the score sheet. At the time the match was called off, Thika United were leading 1–0. The KPL awarded Thika United a 2–0 victory, and A.F.C. Leopards were handed a fine of KSh.500,000/= to be paid by 20 June 2014.

On 26 October 2014, fans of Gor Mahia turned violent at the Kenyatta Stadium in Machakos after their team's 3–2 loss to Sofapaka. Fans began throwing objects at the police after the match, and over an hour after the game both teams and a number of fans were still stranded at the stadium. Following the match, Machakos County governor Alfred Mutua released a statement on behalf of the county government, banning Gor Mahia from the stadium "until further notice", and charging them KSh.10 million/= as compensation for damage caused to public and private property. The Football Kenya Federation then fined the club KSh.500,000/= for the crowd trouble and ordered them to play their remaining league games behind closed doors, while Sofapaka were also fined KSh.300,000/= for failing to place sufficient security measures in the stadium as the host team. However, in response to the sanctions imposed on Gor Mahia by the Machakos County government, the club's secretary-general Chris Omondi announced that the club would not be "paying any cent to Mutua", questioning his authority to impose a ban on the club.

== League table ==
Pos	Team	Pld	W	D	L	GF	GA	GD	Pts	Qualification or relegation
1	Gor Mahia (C)	30	17	9	4	43	21	+22	60	Qualification for 2015 CAF Champions League
2	Sofapaka	30	16	9	5	49	27	+22	57	Qualification for 2015 CAF Confederation Cup (Note: Sofapaka qualified for the 2015 CAF Confederation Cup as winners of the 2014 FKF President's Cup.)
3	Tusker	30	14	11	5	42	25	+17	53	
4	Ulinzi Stars	30	12	15	3	33	20	+13	51	
5	Chemelil Sugar	30	12	12	6	24	16	+8	48	
6	SoNy Sugar	30	9	14	7	27	21	+6	41 (Note: Sony Sugar were awarded 3 points and 2 goals after AFC Leopards failed to turn up for their match scheduled for 10 December.)	
7	A.F.C. Leopards	30	10	11	9	30	25	+5	41	
8	Muhoroni Youth	30	10	10	10	23	28	−5	40	
9	Thika United	30	9	12	9	31	31	0	39	
10	Mathare United	30	10	8	12	19	25	−6	38	
11	Western Stima	30	9	9	12	26	33	−7	36	
12	Ushuru	30	10	3	17	22	40	−18	33	
13	Bandari	30	5	15	10	23	29	−6	30	
14	Kenya Commercial Bank	30	7	8	15	30	39	−9	29	
15	Nairobi City Stars (R)	30	4	12	14	18	35	−17	24	Relegation to 2015 National Super League
16	Nakuru AllStars (R)	30	3	8	19	13	38	−25	17	Relegation to 2015 National Super League

Updated to match(es) played on 8 November 2014. Source: Kenyan Premier League
Rules for classification: 1) points; 2) goal difference; 3) number of goals scored.
(C) Champions; (R) Relegated

=== Positions by round ===
The table lists the positions of teams after each week of matches. In order to preserve chronological evolutions, any postponed matches are not included to the round at which they were originally scheduled, but added to the full round they were played immediately afterwards. For example, if a match is scheduled for matchday 13, but then postponed and played between days 16 and 17, it will be added to the standings for day 16.

Team ╲ Round	1	2	3	4	5	6	7	8	9	10	11	12	13	14	15	16	17	18	19	20	21	22	23	24	25	26	27	28	29	30
Gor Mahia	4	2	3	7	3	4	6	3	2	1	1	1	1	1	1	2	1	1	1	2	2	2	1	1	1	1	1	1	1	1
Sofapaka	1	6	2	6	7	6	7	4	3	4	4	5	5	4	4	3	3	3	3	3	3	3	2	2	2	2	2	2	2	2
Tusker	10	3	6	4	4	1	1	1	1	3	5	3	2	2	2	1	2	2	2	1	1	1	3	3	3	3	3	3	3	3
Ulinzi Stars	11	12	11	10	11	12	13	12	13	13	12	7	9	10	10	7	7	7	6	7	9	7	7	7	5	4	4	4	4	4
Chemelil Sugar	7	4	5	2	1	2	2	2	4	2	2	2	4	3	3	4	4	5	4	4	4	4	4	4	4	5	5	5	5	5
A.F.C. Leopards	6	11	13	15	9	9	8	10	11	11	10	12	11	11	11	12	13	10	9	9	7	8	8	9	12	12	8	6	6	6
Muhoroni Youth	16	16	15	14	10	8	9	8	6	9	8	6	6	6	8	11	12	13	12	11	12	12	12	11	11	7	9	9	10	7
Thika United	9	5	7	9	6	5	5	5	5	6	6	10	8	8	9	9	11	8	8	6	6	5	5	5	6	6	6	8	8	8
SoNy Sugar	2	1	1	3	2	3	4	7	8	7	9	9	7	7	6	6	6	6	7	8	10	10	10	12	9	8	7	7	7	9
Mathare United	12	14	12	11	12	13	14	14	14	14	14	13	12	13	12	10	8	9	10	10	8	9	9	8	7	10	11	11	9	10
Western Stima	5	8	4	1	5	7	3	6	9	8	7	8	10	9	7	8	10	12	13	13	11	11	11	10	10	9	10	10	11	11
Ushuru	13	9	9	5	8	10	11	9	7	5	3	4	3	5	5	5	5	4	5	5	5	6	6	6	8	11	12	12	12	12
Bandari	3	7	10	12	14	14	12	13	10	10	11	11	13	12	13	13	9	11	11	12	13	13	13	13	13	13	13	13	13	13
Kenya Commercial Bank	8	13	14	13	15	15	15	16	16	15	15	15	15	16	16	16	16	16	16	15	15	15	14	14	14	14	14	14	14	14
Nairobi City Stars	14	10	8	8	13	11	10	11	12	12	13	14	14	14	14	14	14	14	14	14	14	14	15	15	15	15	15	15	15	15
Nakuru AllStars	15	15	16	16	16	16	16	15	15	16	16	16	16	15	15	15	15	15	15	16	16	16	16	16	16	16	16	16	16	16

Leader
Relegation to the 2015 Kenyan National Super League

Updated to match(es) played on 8 November 2014. Source: Futaa.com
Notes: Top 8 qualified for the 2015 KPL Top 8 Cup

== Results ==
Home \ Away	AFC	BND	CHM	GOR	KCB	MAU	MHY	NCS	SOF	SNY	THU	NAS	TUS	ULS	UFC	WST
A.F.C. Leopards		0–0	0–0	2–2	2–2	1–2	0–0	1–1	1–2	1–0	3–0	1–0	1–0	0–0	3–1	0–0
Bandari	2–3		0–1	2–1	1–1	0–1	1–0	0–0	0–0	1–1	1–2	0–0	1–1	1–1	2–0	1–1
Chemelil Sugar	0–1	0–2		0–1	2–0	0–0	2–1	0–1	1–0	2–0	2–1	2–0	0–0	1–2	0–0	0–0
Gor Mahia	1–3	0–0	2–0		3–2	1–0	3–0	2–0	2–1	1–0	1–1	1–0	1–1	0–0	3–0	2–0
Kenya Commercial Bank	1–1	1–2	1–2	0–0		4–0	0–1	1–1	0–1	0–0	3–1	3–2	1–2	1–0	1–0	0–3
Mathare United	1–0	1–0	1–2	0–1	0–0		0–1	1–0	1–2	1–1	2–1	1–1	0–1	0–2	2–0	2–0
Muhoroni Youth	1–0	0–0	0–0	1–3	1–0	0–1		1–0	1–5	1–1	1–0	1–1	1–1	0–0	3–1	1–0
Nairobi City Stars	0–2	1–0	0–0	1–4	0–2	0–0	1–2		0–1	1–1	2–3	0–0	0–1	0–0	1–2	1–1
Sofapaka	0–0	3–0	1–1	3–2	3–0	1–0	1–0	1–2		0–1	0–2	3–0	4–2	1–1	3–2	3–3
SoNy Sugar	2–0 (Note: Sony Sugar were handed a walkover with 3 points and 2 goals after AFC Leopards failed to turn up for the match.)	1–1	0–0	0–1	1–0	0–0	2–1	2–0	2–2		1–1	3–0	1–0	0–1	2–0	0–1
Thika United	2–0	3–1	0–0	0–0	2–1	1–1	0–0	1–1	0–0	1–1		0–1	1–1	0–1	1–0	1–0
Nakuru AllStars	0–2	0–0	0–1	2–0	2–3	0–1	1–1	0–1	0–1	0–0	0–1		1–1	0–1	1–0	1–2
Tusker	0–0	2–1	0–1	1–1	2–0	3–0	2–0	1–1	2–2	1–0	2–2	3–0		2–1	3–1	3–1
Ulinzi Stars	2–1	0–0	1–1	1–2	2–1	0–0	1–1	1–1	1–1	2–2	1–1	2–0	2–1		0–0	3–0
Ushuru	1–0	2–1	0–2	0–0	1–0	1–0	1–0	3–1	0–3	0–1	2–1	1–0	0–2	2–3		1–0
Western Stima	2–1	2–2	1–1	0–2	1–1	1–0	0–2	1–0	0–1	1–1	2–1	2–0	0–1	0–1	1–0	

Updated to match(es) played on 8 November 2014. Source: Kenyan Premier League
Legend: Blue = home team win; Yellow = draw; Red = away team win.

== Top scorers ==
Rank	Player	Club	Goals
1	(Uganda) Dan Sserunkuma	Gor Mahia	16
2	(Kenya) Enock Agwanda	Sofapaka	11
2	(Kenya) Stephen Waruru	Ulinzi Stars	11
4	(Kenya) Ekaliana Ndolo	Sofapaka	9
4	(Kenya) Michael Olunga	Thika United	9
4	(Kenya) Jesse Were	Tusker	9
7	(Kenya) Dennis Odhiambo	Thika United	8
8	(Burundi) Fiston Abdul Razak	Sofapaka	7
8	(Kenya) John Baraza	Sofapaka	7
8	(Kenya) Enos Ochieng	Muhoroni Youth	7
8	(Kenya) Edwin Oduor	Sony Sugar	7
8	(Kenya) Samuel Onyango	Sony Sugar	7
8	(Kenya) Brian Osumba	Tusker	7

Last updated: 8 November 2014

=== Hat-tricks ===
Player	For	Against	Score	Date
(Uganda) Dan Sserunkuma	Gor Mahia	Nairobi City	1-4	4 October 2014
(Kenya) Stephen Waruru	Ulinzi Stars	Western Stima	3-0	18 October 2014

== See also ==
- 2014 FKF President's Cup
- 2014 KPL Top 8 Cup
- 2014 Kenyan Super Cup
