= 2014 in Kenyan football =

Football in Kenya
- Season: 2014

Men's football
- Premier League: Gor Mahia
- National Super League: Posta Rangers (Zone A); Shabana (Zone B)
- President's Cup: Sofapaka
- Top 8 Cup: Tusker
- Super Cup: Cancelled

The following article is a summary of the 2014 football season in Kenya, which is the 51st competitive season in its history.

The announcement of the men's under-17 national team's failure to participate in their 2015 African U-17 Championship qualification match against South Sudan was met very negatively by Kenyan football fans, and questioned the administration of then Football Kenya Federation president Sam Nyamweya.

== Domestic leagues ==
=== Changes in the football league system ===
On 10 July 2013, it was announced that the Football Kenya Federation had introduced a new league system to take effect from the beginning of the season. This involved the introduction and scrapping of a few leagues, and the re-organisation of the system. For the 2015 season, the Kenyan Premier League will be contested by 18 teams.

Level	League/Division(s)							
1 Premier League	Premier League; 16 clubs							
2 Super League	Zone A 12 clubs				Zone B 12 clubs			
3 Division One	Zone A 20 clubs				Zone B 20 clubs			
4 Provincial Leagues	Nyanza League; 20 clubs	Western League; 20 clubs	Rift Valley League; 20 clubs	Central League; 20 clubs	Nairobi League; 20 clubs	Eastern League; 20 clubs	North Eastern League; 20 clubs	Coast League; 20 clubs
5 County; Champions League	Baringo League	Bomet League	Bungoma League	Busia League	Embu League	Garissa League	Isiolo League	Kiambu League
5 County; Champions League	Elgeyo-Marakwet League	Homa Bay League	Kajiado League	Kakamega League	Kilifi League	Kirinyaga League	Kitui League	Kwale League
5 County; Champions League	Kericho League	Kisii League	Kisumu League	Laikipia League	Lamu League	Machakos League	Makueni League	Mandera League
5 County; Champions League	Migori League	Nakuru League	Nandi League	Narok League	Marsabit League	Meru League	Mombasa League	Murang'a League
5 County; Champions League	Nyamira League	Samburu League	Siaya League	Trans-Nzoia League	Nairobi A. League	Nairobi B. League	Nyandarua League	Nyeri League
5 County; Champions League	Turkana League	Uasin Gishu League	Vihiga League	West Pokot League	Taita-Taveta League	Tana River League	Tharaka-Nithi League	Wajir League
6 Sub-County Leagues	Sub-County Leagues							

=== Promotion and relegation ===
Promoted to Premier League

- Kenya Revenue Authority
- Top Fry AllStars

Promoted from FKF Division One

- Administration Police
- Agrochemical
- Bidco United
- Busia United Stars
- FC Talanta
- Finlays Horticulture
- G.F.C. 105
- Hotsprings FC
- Kariobangi Sharks
- Ligi Ndogo
- Mahakama
- Modern Coast Rangers
- MOYAS
- Nairobi Stima
- Nakumatt
- Nzoia United
- Oserian
- Posta Rangers
- Shabana
- St. Joseph
- West Kenya Sugar
- Zoo Kericho

Relegated from Premier League

- Kakamega Homeboyz
- Karuturi Sports

Remaining in Division One

- Admiral
- Alaskan
- Brighter Stars
- Coast United
- Comply
- FC West Ham United
- Field Negroes
- Green Berets
- Gusii Raiders
- Jericho AllStars
- Kambakia Christian Centre
- Kibera Celtic
- Kisero
- Kisumu Municipal
- Kolongolo
- Longonot Horticulture
- Mount Kenya United
- Mumbi Nationale
- Mumcop
- Sparki Youth
- Suam Orchards
- Timsales
- Utawala
- Vihiga Stars

=== Premier League ===
The 2014 Kenyan Premier League season began on 15 February and ended on 8 November.

Pos	Team	Pld	W	D	L	GF	GA	GD	Pts	Qualification or relegation
1	Gor Mahia (C)	30	17	9	4	43	21	+22	60	Qualification for 2015 CAF Champions League
2	Sofapaka	30	16	9	5	49	27	+22	57	Qualification for 2015 CAF Confederation Cup (Note: Sofapaka qualified for the 2015 CAF Confederation Cup as winners of the 2014 FKF President's Cup.)
3	Tusker	30	14	11	5	42	25	+17	53	
4	Ulinzi Stars	30	12	15	3	33	20	+13	51	
5	Chemelil Sugar	30	12	12	6	24	16	+8	48	
6	SoNy Sugar	30	9	14	7	27	21	+6	41 (Note: Sony Sugar were awarded 3 points and 2 goals after AFC Leopards failed to turn up for their match scheduled for 10 December.)	
7	A.F.C. Leopards	30	10	11	9	30	25	+5	41	
8	Muhoroni Youth	30	10	10	10	23	28	−5	40	
9	Thika United	30	9	12	9	31	31	0	39	
10	Mathare United	30	10	8	12	19	25	−6	38	
11	Western Stima	30	9	9	12	26	33	−7	36	
12	Ushuru	30	10	3	17	22	40	−18	33	
13	Bandari	30	5	15	10	23	29	−6	30	
14	Kenya Commercial Bank	30	7	8	15	30	39	−9	29	
15	Nairobi City Stars (R)	30	4	12	14	18	35	−17	24	Relegation to 2015 National Super League
16	Nakuru AllStars (R)	30	3	8	19	13	38	−25	17	Relegation to 2015 National Super League

Updated to match(es) played on 8 November 2014. Source: Kenyan Premier League
Rules for classification: 1) points; 2) goal difference; 3) number of goals scored.
(C) Champions; (R) Relegated

=== National Super League ===
The 2014 Kenyan National Super League season began on 15 March and concluded on 2 November.

==== Zone A ====
Pos	Team	Pld	W	D	L	GF	GA	GD	Pts	Qualification or relegation
1	Posta Rangers (C, P)	22	17	3	2	40	13	+27	54	Promotion to 2015 Kenyan Premier League (Note: The winners of the 2014 FKF President's Cup will qualify for the 2015 CAF Confederation Cup.)
2	Nakumatt (P)	22	13	5	4	26	10	+16	44	Promotion to 2015 Kenyan Premier League
3	FC Talanta	22	11	6	5	30	19	+11	39	
4	Oserian	22	8	7	7	24	20	+4	31	
5	Nairobi Stima	22	8	7	7	20	18	+2	31	
6	Ligi Ndogo	22	6	10	6	21	21	0	28	
7	Bidco United	22	6	9	7	17	18	−1	27	
8	Kariobangi Sharks	22	5	9	8	19	25	−6	24	
9	MOYAS	22	6	5	11	17	22	−5	23	
10	Modern Coast Rangers	22	4	9	9	11	19	−8	21	
11	Administration Police (R)	22	4	7	11	11	27	−16	19	Relegation to 2015 FKF Division One
12	Mahakama (R)	22	3	5	14	15	39	−24	14	Relegation to 2015 FKF Division One

Updated to match(es) played on 2 November 2014. Source: Kenyan National Super League
Rules for classification: 1) points; 2) goal difference; 3) number of goals scored.
(C) Champions; (P) Promoted; (R) Relegated

==== Zone B ====
Pos	Team	Pld	W	D	L	GF	GA	GD	Pts	Qualification or relegation
1	Agrochemical	16	11	3	2	21	7	+14	36	Promotion to 2015 Kenyan Premier League (Note: The winners of the 2014 FKF President's Cup will qualify for the 2015 CAF Confederation Cup.)
2	Kakamega Homeboyz	14	10	2	2	23	9	+14	32	
3	Zoo Kericho	14	10	1	3	28	14	+14	31	
4	Shabana	15	9	1	5	23	11	+12	28	
5	West Kenya Sugar	16	8	4	4	19	12	+7	28	
6	St. Joseph	14	6	6	2	13	9	+4	24	
7	Finlays Horticulture	14	6	2	6	13	11	+2	20	
8	Nzoia United	15	5	5	5	16	16	0	20	
9	Busia United Stars	15	5	2	8	11	20	−9	17	
10	G.F.C. 105	15	1	3	11	7	21	−14	6	
11	Vegpro	14	0	3	11	7	26	−19	3	Relegation to 2015 FKF Division One
12	Rift Valley United	14	1	0	13	5	30	−25	3	Relegation to 2015 FKF Division One

Updated to match(es) played on 6 September 2014. Source: Kenyan National Super League
Rules for classification: 1) points; 2) goal difference; 3) number of goals scored.

== Domestic cups ==
=== President's Cup ===
The 2014 FKF President's Cup began on 26 April and ended on 15 November.

Third round
A.F.C. Leopards	3
Mathare United	2
Ligi Ndogo	3
Zoo Kericho	0
Mumbi Nationale	0
Ulinzi Stars	6
Nakumatt	2
Tusker	6
Top Fry AllStars	0
Intercity	2
FC Talanta	1
Administration Police	2
Nyakach United	1
Muhoroni Youth	3
Sofapaka	6
Rift Valley United	0
Gor Mahia	1 (2)
G.F.C. 105	1 (4)
Bandari (w/o)	2
Finlays Horticulture	0
Posta Rangers	4
Ulinzi Warriors	0
Chemelil Sugar	1
MOYAS	0
Kakamega Homeboyz	1 (0)
Shabana	1 (3)
Agrochemical	1
Nairobi Stima	0
Nairobi City Stars	1
Wazito	2
West Kenya Sugar	2
Imara United	0

Fourth round
A.F.C. Leopards	2
Ligi Ndogo	0
Ulinzi Stars	1 (3)
Tusker	1 (5)
Intercity	0 (5)
Administration Police	0 (6)
Muhoroni Youth	1
Sofapaka	2
G.F.C. 105	0
Bandari	2
Posta Rangers	2
Chemelil Sugar	0
Shabana	1
Agrochemical	3
Wazito	1 (4)
West Kenya Sugar	1 (5)

Quarter-finals
A.F.C. Leopards	3
Tusker	2
Administration Police	1
Sofapaka	3
Bandari	0
Posta Rangers	1
Agrochemical	0
West Kenya Sugar	1

Semi-finals
A.F.C. Leopards	0
Sofapaka	2
Posta Rangers	0 (10)
West Kenya Sugar	0 (9)

Final
Sofapaka	2
Posta Rangers	1

=== Super Cup ===
The 2014 Kenyan Super Cup match to be contested by 2013 Kenyan Premier League champions Gor Mahia and the 2013 FKF President's Cup champions A.F.C. Leopards was cancelled by the Football Kenya Federation due to a lack of sponsors.

=== Top 8 Cup ===
The 2014 KPL Top 8 Cup began on 5 April and concluded on 15 June.

Quarterfinals
Sofapaka	1 (4)
Tusker	1 (5)
Gor Mahia	2
Thika United	1
A.F.C. Leopards	1
Bandari	0
K.C.B.	2
Ulinzi Stars	1

Semifinals
Tusker	1	1	2
Gor Mahia	0	1	1
A.F.C. Leopards	1	3	4
K.C.B.	1	0	1

Finals
Tusker	2
A.F.C. Leopards	1

== International club competitions ==
=== Champions League ===
The 2014 CAF Champions League began on 7 February and is scheduled to end on 2 November. Gor Mahia represented Kenya in the competition, having won the 2013 Kenyan Premier League.

==== Preliminary round ====
In the preliminary round, Gor Mahia faced the 2012–13 Gabon Championnat National D1 champions US Bitam over two legs, played on 8 and 16 February.

8 February 2014	Gor Mahia (Kenya)	1 – 0	(Gabon) US Bitam	Madaraka Estate, Nairobi
16:00 UTC+3	Sserunkuma 75' (pen.)	Report		Stadium: Nyayo National Stadium; Referee: Denis Batte (Uganda)

16 February 2014	US Bitam (Gabon)	1 – 0 (2 – 4 p)	(Kenya) Gor Mahia	Bitam, Gabon
	Unidentified 12'	Report		Stadium: Stade Gaston Peyrille
	Penalties
			(penalty scored) Walusimbi; (penalty scored) Salim; (penalty scored) Shakava; (penalty scored) Mutiso

1–1 on aggregate. Gor Mahia won the penalty shoot-out and advanced to the first round.

==== First round ====
In the first round, Gor Mahia faced the 2012–13 Tunisian Ligue Professionnelle 1 runners-up and 2011 CAF Champions League winners Espérance de Tunis over two legs, played on 1 and 10 March. They were eliminated from the competition, having lost 8–2 on aggregate.

1 March 2014	Gor Mahia (Kenya)	2 – 3	(Tunisia) Espérance de Tunis	Madaraka Estate, Nairobi
16:00 UTC+3	Sserunkuma 15' (pen.); Shakava 80'	Report	Akaichi 27'; N'Djeng 64'; Jouini 89'	Stadium: Nyayo National Stadium; Referee: Bouchaib El Ahrach (Morocco)

10 March 2014	Espérance de Tunis (Tunisia)	5 – 0	(Kenya) Gor Mahia	Radès, Tunis
16:00 UTC+1	Jouini 44', 48', 57'; Afful 55'; Mhirsi 75'			Stadium: Stade Olympique de Radès; Referee: Daniel Bennett (South Africa)

=== Confederation Cup ===
The 2014 CAF Confederation Cup began on 7 February and is scheduled to end on 7 December. A.F.C. Leopards represented Kenya in the competition, having won the 2013 FKF President's Cup.

==== Preliminary round ====
In the preliminary round, A.F.C. Leopards faced 2013 Ethiopian Cup champions Defence over two legs, played on 9 and 16 February.

9 February 2014	A.F.C. Leopards (Kenya)	2 – 0	(Ethiopia) Defence	Madaraka Estate, Nairobi
16:00 UTC+3	Imbalambala 18'; Keli 43'	Report		Stadium: Nyayo National Stadium; Referee: Gervais Munyanziza (Rwanda)

16 February 2014	Defence (Ethiopia)	1 – 2	(Kenya) A.F.C. Leopards	Addis Ababa, Ethiopia
16:00 UTC+3	Tilahun 38'	Report	Wanga 46', 89'	Stadium: Addis Ababa Stadium; Referee: Fuengi Claude Ntuntu (Congo DR)

==== First round ====
In the first round, A.F.C. Leopards faced the 2012–13 Nedbank Cup runners-up SuperSport United over two legs, played on 1 and 9 March. They were eliminated from the competition, having lost 4–2 on aggregate.

1 March 2014	SuperSport United (South Africa)	2 – 0	(Kenya) A.F.C. Leopards	Atteridgeville, Pretoria
21:15 UTC+2	Mathebula 43'; Chenene 90+1'	Report		Stadium: Lucas Moripe Stadium; Referee: Jose Rachide (Mozambique)

9 March 2014	A.F.C. Leopards (Kenya)	2 – 2	(South Africa) SuperSport United	Madaraka Estate, Nairobi
16:00 UTC+3	Situma 48'; Wanga 90'	Report	Phala 54'; Doutie 79'	Stadium: Nyayo National Stadium; Referee: Israel Mujuni (Tanzania)

=== Kagame Interclub Cup ===
The 2014 Kagame Interclub Cup began on 8 August and ended on 24 August. Gor Mahia represented Kenya in the competition.

==== Group stage ====
In the group stage, Gor Mahia were drawn in Group B alongside Ugandan club Kampala Capital City Authority, Rwandan giants A.P.R., Burundian side Atlético Olympic and Djibouti Télécom of Djibouti. They were eliminated from the competition, having garnered only 2 points from a possible 12 from 4 matches, and finished bottom of their group.

Group B
Team	Pld	W	D	L	GF	GA	GD	Pts
(Uganda) Kampala C.C.A.	4	3	0	1	5	3	+2	9
(Rwanda) A.P.R.	4	2	1	1	4	3	+1	7
(Burundi) Atlético Olympic	4	2	0	2	3	3	0	6
Djibouti Télécom	4	1	1	2	5	6	−1	4
(Kenya) Gor Mahia	4	0	2	2	5	7	−2	2

8 August 2014	Gor Mahia (Kenya)	1–2	(Uganda) Kampala C.C.A.	Amahoro Stadium
15:00	Sserunkuma 27'	Report	Majwega 53'; Umony 88'	Referee: Gervais Munyanziza (Rwanda)

11 August 2014	Gor Mahia (Kenya)	0–1	(Burundi) Atlético Olympic	Stade Régional Nyamirambo
15:00		Report	Hakizimana 72'	Referee: Israel Mujuni (Tanzania)

15 August 2014	A.P.R. (Rwanda)	2–2	(Kenya) Gor Mahia	Stade Régional Nyamirambo
17:00	Mugiraneza 22'; Mubumbvi 90'	Report	Kizito 60'; Walusimbi 81'	Referee: Israel Mujuni (Tanzania)

17 August 2014	Djibouti Télécom	2–2	(Kenya) Gor Mahia	Stade Régional Nyamirambo
15:00	Djama 38'; Andasanco 74' (pen.)	Report	Otieno 57'; Mohammed 90'	Referee: Gervais Munyanziza (Rwanda)

== National teams ==
=== Men's senior ===
==== Africa Cup of Nations qualification ====
The men's senior national team participated in qualification for the 2015 Africa Cup of Nations.

===== First round =====
In the first round, Kenya faced Comoros over two legs, played on 17 and 31 May.

17 May 2014	Kenya	1 – 0	Comoros	Madaraka Estate, Nairobi
16:00 UTC+3	Omolo 35'	Report		Stadium: Nyayo National Stadium; Referee: Wellington Kaoma (Zambia)

31 May 2014	Comoros	1 – 1	Kenya	Mitsamiouli, Grande Comore
15:00 UTC+3	Saandi 72'	Report	Masika 58'	Stadium: Stade Said Mohamed Cheikh; Referee: Djamal Aden (Djibouti)

===== Second round =====
In the second round, Kenya faced Lesotho over two legs, played on 20 July and 3 August. Lesotho won 1–0 on aggregate and advanced to Group C in the group stage.

20 July 2014	Lesotho	1 – 0	Kenya	Maseru, Maseru District
16:00 UTC+2	Moletsane 65'	Report		Stadium: Setsoto Stadium; Referee: Samuel Chirindza (Mozambique)

3 August 2014	Kenya	0 – 0	Lesotho	Madaraka Estate, Nairobi
16:00 UTC+3		Report		Stadium: Nyayo National Stadium; Referee: Aurélien Juenkou (Cameroon)

==== Friendlies ====
The following is a list of friendlies played by the men's senior national team in 2014.

5 March 2014	Sudan	Cancelled	Kenya	Al-Fashir, Sudan
20:00 UTC+3

15 July 2014	Kenya	0 – 0	Burundi	Madaraka, Nairobi
17:00 UTC+3	Wanyama (red card) 59'	Report		Stadium: Nyayo National Stadium

30 August 2014	Egypt	1 – 0	Kenya	Aswan, Aswan
22:00 UTC+2	Gamal 55'	Report		Stadium: Aswan Stadium

=== Women's senior ===
==== African Women's Championship qualification ====
The women's senior national team participated in qualification for the 2014 African Women's Championship.

===== First round =====
In the first round, Kenya faced Rwanda over two legs, played on 16 February and 1 March. They were eliminated on away goals rule, after drawing 2–2 on aggregate.

16 February 2014	Rwanda	1 – 0	Kenya	Nyamirambo, Kigali
15:30 UTC+2	Niyoyita 29'	Report		Stadium: Stade Régional Nyamirambo

1 March 2014	Kenya	2 – 1	Rwanda	Machakos, Machakos
	Ogolla; Amau	Report	Nyirahatashima	Stadium: Kenyatta Stadium

2–2 on aggregate. Rwanda win on away goals.

=== Men's under-20 ===
==== African U-20 Championship qualification ====
The men's national under-20 team participated in qualification for the 2015 African U-20 Championship.

===== First round =====
In the first round, Kenya faced Tanzania over two legs, played on 6 and 27 April. They were eliminated, having lost the deciding penalty shoot-out after the match ended 0–0 on aggregate.

6 April 2014	Kenya	0 – 0	Tanzania	Machakos, Machakos
16:00		Report		Stadium: Kenyatta Stadium

27 April 2014	Tanzania	0 – 0 (4 – 3 p)	Kenya
		Report
	Penalties
	Husseini (penalty scored); Yahya (penalty missed); Friday (penalty scored); Chagula (penalty scored); Suleiman (penalty scored)		(penalty missed) Nzivo; (penalty missed) Makari; (penalty scored) Shiveka; (penalty scored) Wanyonyi; (penalty scored) Ndinya

0–0 on aggregate. Tanzania win the penalty shoot-out and advance to the second round.

==== Friendlies ====
The following is a list of friendlies (to be) played by the men's national under-20 team in 2014.

16 April 2014	Kenya	3 – 3	Italy Lega Pro U18	Madaraka Estate, Nairobi
	King'atua 40', 60'; Wanyonyi 49'	Report	Moreo 9', 54'; Zottino 20' (pen.)	Stadium: Nyayo National Stadium

=== Boys' under-17 ===
==== African U-17 Championship qualification ====
The boys' national under-17 team was to participate in qualification for the 2015 African U-17 Championship, but the Football Kenya Federation withdrew the team from the competition, citing a "lack of funds" to send the team off to compete. The announcement was met very negatively by Kenyan football fans, who questioned the administration of current FKF president Sam Nyamweya. Among the concerned parties was former FC Talanta executive director Jérôme J. Dufourg, who claimed he was jailed and then deported from Kenya after speaking out against mismanagement of funds by the FKF in 2013. This followed earlier pushes for Nyamweya's removal from several others as early as 2012, and anti-corruption investigations carried out against him and other FKF officials in 2013.
