= 2016 in Kenyan football =

Football in Kenya
- Season: 2016

Men's football
- Premier League: Tusker
- National Super League: Nzoia United
- President's Cup: Tusker
- Top 8 Cup: Muhoroni Youth
- Super Cup: Bandari

The following article is a summary of the 2016 football season in Kenya, which was the 52nd competitive season in its history.

== Football Kenya Federation elections ==
On 10 February, the Football Kenya Federation held elections for a new president, vice-president and new members of the federation's National Executive Committee (NEC). Prior to the elections, three of the five candidates pulled out of the presidential race, while incumbent president Sam Nyamweya announced his withdrawal during a speech made before voting began.

A total of 77 delegates took part in the voting process, which took place at the Moi International Sports Centre in Kasarani, Nairobi.

=== President ===
Candidate	Votes	%
Nick Mwendwa	50	64.94%
Ambrose Rachier	27	35.06%
Ssemi Aina	Withdrew	
Lukorito Jones	Withdrew	
Sammy Sholei	Withdrew	
Total	77	100%

=== Vice-president ===
Candidate	Votes	%
Doris Petra	53	96.36%
Dan Shikanda	1	1.82%
Andrew Amukowa	0	0.00%
Spoiled votes	1	1.82%
Total	55	100%

=== National Executive Committee ===
==== Central ====
Candidate	Votes	%
David Kimani	47	61.04%
George Wainaina	27	35.06%
Spoiled votes	3	3.90%
Total	77	100%

==== Coast ====
Candidate	Votes	%
Raphael Mwalungo	44	57.14%
Mohammed Omar	19	24.68%
Ricky Solomon	13	16.88%
Spoiled votes	1	1.30%
Total	77	100%

==== Eastern ====
Candidate	Votes	%
Timothy Muriithi	51	66.23%
Angeline Mwikali	25	32.47%
Spoiled votes	1	1.30%
Total	77	100%

==== Nairobi ====
Candidate	Votes	%
Chris Amimo	31	40.26%
Jacob Odundo	23	29.87%
Simon Mugo	12	15.58%
Obura	10	12.99%
Ken Oliech	0	0.00%
Spoiled votes	1	1.30%
Total	77	100%

==== North-Eastern ====
Candidate	Votes	%
Mohammed Mula	68	88.31%
Said Djibril	4	5.19%
Spoiled votes	5	6.49%
Total	77	100%

==== Nyanza ====
Candidate	Votes	%
Joseph Andere	53	68.83%
Charles Birundu	24	31.17%
Philip Owoti	0	0.00%
Spoiled votes	1	1.30%
Total	77	100%

==== Rift Valley ====
Candidate	Votes	%
David Gikaria	42	54.55%
Joe Birgen	23	29.87%
Joseph Kiptai	4	5.19%
Moses Kimalik	4	5.19%
Bernard Shitiabayi	2	2.60%
Isaac Letting	0	0.00%
Total	77	100%

==== Western ====
Candidate	Votes	%
Enos Kweya	36	46.75%
Dennis Opoki	15	19.48%
Duncan Kizito	14	18.18%
Julius Ngue	11	14.29%
Spoiled votes	1	1.30%
Total	77	100%

== Domestic leagues ==
=== Promotion and relegation ===
Promoted to Premier League

- Kakamega Homeboyz
- Posta Rangers

Relegated from Premier League

- Kenya Commercial Bank
- Nakuru AllStars

=== Premier League ===
The 2016 Kenyan Premier League season began on 13 February and ended on 29 October.

Pos	Team	Pld	W	D	L	GF	GA	GD	Pts	Qualification or relegation
1	Tusker (C, Q)	30	17	10	3	40	25	+15	61	Qualification to 2017 CAF Champions League
2	Gor Mahia	30	15	12	3	35	14	+21	54 (Note: On 26 May 2016 (matchday 15), A.F.C. Leopards and Gor Mahia were deducted 3 points each for hooliganism involved in their matches at home against Ulinzi Stars and away at Tusker, respectively.)	
3	Ulinzi Stars (Q)	30	11	13	6	35	25	+10	46 (Note: Ulinzi Stars qualified for the 2017 CAF Confederation Cup as runners-up of the 2016 FKF President's Cup, which was won by league champions Tusker.)	Qualification to 2017 CAF Confederation Cup
4	Posta Rangers	30	10	15	5	22	15	+7	45	
5	Chemelil Sugar	30	12	9	9	24	24	0	45	
6	Western Stima	30	10	14	6	32	24	+8	44	
7	Mathare United	30	11	11	8	33	29	+4	44	
8	Kakamega Homeboyz	30	10	12	8	27	25	+2	42	
9	Sony Sugar	30	10	9	11	23	21	+2	39	
10	Muhoroni Youth	30	10	8	12	26	32	−6	38	
11	Bandari	30	9	10	11	28	31	−3	37	
12	Thika United	30	8	10	12	24	32	−8	34	
13	A.F.C. Leopards	30	8	9	13	32	38	−6	30	
14	Sofapaka	30	7	5	18	34	40	−6	26	
15	Ushuru (R)	30	5	11	14	24	42	−18	26	Relegation to National Super League
16	Nairobi City Stars (R)	30	3	10	17	17	39	−22	19	Relegation to National Super League

Updated to match(es) played on 19 November 2016. Source: Kenyan Premier League
Rules for classification: 1) Points; 2) Goal difference; 3) Number of goals scored
(C) Champions; (Q) Qualified for the phase indicated; (R) Relegated

=== National Super League ===
The 2016 Kenyan National Super League season began on 19 March and ended on 10 December.

Pos	Team	Pld	W	D	L	GF	GA	GD	Pts	Qualification or relegation
1	Nzoia United (C, P)	38	28	8	2	73	20	+53	92	Promotion to Premier League
2	Kariobangi Sharks (P)	38	24	11	3	58	21	+37	83	Promotion to Premier League
3	Zoo Kericho (P)	38	24	9	5	66	28	+38	81	Promotion to Premier League
4	Nakumatt (P)	38	23	8	7	60	28	+32	77	Promotion to Premier League
5	Kenya Commercial Bank	38	21	8	9	42	32	+10	71	
6	Vihiga United	38	18	15	5	53	24	+29	69	
7	Palos	38	15	13	10	46	40	+6	58	
8	Agrochemical	38	14	11	13	42	36	+6	53	
9	Nairobi Stima	38	13	13	12	39	35	+4	52	
10	Wazito	38	14	9	15	40	42	−2	51	
11	Bidco United	38	13	12	13	42	35	+7	51	
12	MOYAS	38	11	12	15	43	54	−11	45	
13	Police	38	10	12	16	44	59	−15	42	
14	Modern Coast Rangers	38	11	8	19	35	48	−13	41	
15	Oserian	38	10	11	17	32	38	−6	41	
16	Nakuru AllStars	38	8	13	17	36	52	−16	37	
17	FC Talanta	38	5	12	21	22	53	−31	27	
18	St. Joseph	38	6	8	24	28	66	−38	26	
19	Ligi Ndogo (R)	38	3	13	22	24	60	−36	22	Relegation to Division One
20	Shabana (R)	38	4	4	30	29	83	−54	16	Relegation to Division One

Updated to match(es) played on 10 December 2016. Source: Kenyan National Super League
Rules for classification: 1) Points; 2) Goal difference; 3) Number of goals scored
(C) Champions; (P) Promoted; (R) Relegated

== Domestic cups ==
=== Super Cup ===
The 2016 Kenyan Super Cup match was played on 6 February between Gor Mahia, the 2015 Kenyan Premier League champions, and Bandari, the 2015 FKF President's Cup champions. Bandari won the match 1–0 after 90 minutes.

6 February 2016	Gor Mahia	0–1	Bandari	Manyimbo, Mombasa
15:00 UTC+3		Report	Kimani 68'	Stadium: Mombasa Municipal Stadium; Referee: Raymond Onyango

=== Top 8 Cup ===
The 2016 KPL Top 8 Cup began on 1 May and ended on 16 October.

Quarterfinals
Sofapaka	0
Muhoroni Youth	3
Ulinzi Stars	3
A.F.C. Leopards	2
Bandari	1
Tusker	2
Gor Mahia	1
Ushuru	0

Semifinals
Muhoroni Youth	0	1	1
Ulinzi Stars	0	1	1
Tusker	0	0	0
Gor Mahia	2	1	3

Finals
Muhoroni Youth	1
Gor Mahia	0

== International club competitions ==
=== Champions League ===
The 2016 CAF Champions League began on 12 February and ended on 23 October. Gor Mahia represented Kenya in the competition, having won the 2015 Kenyan Premier League.

==== Preliminary round ====
In the preliminary round, Gor Mahia faced 2015 THB Champions League winners CNaPS Sport over two legs, played on 13 and 27 February. They were eliminated after losing 3–1 on aggregate.

13 February 2016	Gor Mahia (Kenya)	1–2	(Madagascar) CNaPS Sport	Madaraka Estate, Nairobi
16:00 UTC+3	Agwanda 42' (pen.)	Report	?? 13' ?? 80'	Stadium: Nyayo National Stadium; Referee: Mfaume Ali Nassoro (Tanzania)

27 February 2016	CNaPS Sport (Madagascar)	1–0	(Kenya) Gor Mahia	Mahajanga, Boeny
14:30 UTC+3	Rakotoharimalala 28'	Report		Stadium: Rabemananjara Stadium; Referee: Nelson Emile (Seychelles)

=== Confederation Cup ===
The 2016 CAF Confederation Cup began on 12 February and ended on 6 November. Bandari represented Kenya in the competition, having won the 2015 FKF President's Cup.

==== Preliminary round ====
In the preliminary round, Bandari faced 2015 Coupe du Congo champions FC Saint-Éloi Lupopo over two legs, played on 14 and 28 February. They were eliminated after losing 3–1 on aggregate.

14 February 2016	FC Saint-Éloi Lupopo (Democratic Republic of the Congo)	2–0	(Kenya) Bandari	Lubumbashi, Katanga
15:30 UTC+2	Mutshimba 36'; Maolongi 83'	Report		Stadium: Stade Frederic Kibassa Maliba; Referee: Jean Claude Ishimwe (Rwanda)

28 February 2016	Bandari (Kenya)	1–1	(Democratic Republic of the Congo) FC Saint-Éloi Lupopo	Madaraka Estate, Nairobi
15:00 UTC+3	Lavatsa 90' (pen.)	Report	Maolongi 20'	Stadium: Nyayo National Stadium; Referee: Ring Nyier Akech Malong (South Sudan)

== National teams ==
=== Men's senior ===
==== Africa Cup of Nations qualification ====
The men's senior national team participated in qualification for the 2017 Africa Cup of Nations. They were drawn in Group E alongside Zambia, Congo and Guinea-Bissau.

Pos	Team	Pld	W	D	L	GF	GA	GD	Pts	Qualification
1	Guinea-Bissau	6	3	1	2	7	7	0	10	Final tournament
2	Congo	6	2	3	1	9	7	+2	9	
3	Zambia	6	1	4	1	7	7	0	7	
4	Kenya	6	1	2	3	5	7	−2	5	

Source: CAF

23 March 2016	Guinea-Bissau	1–0	Kenya	Bissau, Bissau region
16:00 UTC±0	Camara 18'	Report		Stadium: Estádio 24 de Setembro; Referee: Kokou Fagla (Togo)

27 March 2016	Kenya	0–1	Guinea-Bissau	Madaraka Estate, Nairobi
16:00 UTC+3		Report	Cícero 81'	Stadium: Nyayo National Stadium; Referee: Norman Matemera (Zimbabwe)

5 June 2016	Kenya	2–1	Congo	Kasarani, Nairobi
15:00 UTC+3	Masika 24'; Johanna 67'	Report	Oniangué 19' (pen.)	Stadium: Moi International Sports Centre; Referee: Joseph Lamptey (Ghana)

4 September 2016	Zambia	1–1	Kenya	Ndola, Copperbelt
16:30 UTC+2	Kalaba 87'	Report	Masika 64'	Stadium: Levy Mwanawasa Stadium; Referee: Mahamadou Keita (Mali)

==== Other matches ====
The following is a list of all other matches played by the men's senior national team in 2016.

29 May 2016 Friendly	Kenya	1–1	Tanzania	Kasarani, Nairobi
14:00 UTC+3	Wanyama 38'	Report	Maguri 33'	Stadium: Moi International Sports Centre

31 May 2016 Friendly	Kenya	1–1	Sudan	Kasarani, Nairobi
14:00 UTC+3	Onyango 90+4'	Report	Hamid 24'	Stadium: Moi International Sports Centre

4 October 2016 Friendly	DR Congo	0–1	Kenya	Lingwala, Kinshasa
18:30 UTC+3		Report	Olunga 65'	Stadium: Stade des Martyrs

=== Women's senior ===
==== Africa Women Cup of Nations ====
The women's senior national team participated in the 2016 Africa Women Cup of Nations, which took place in Cameroon from 19 November to 3 December. The team made an appearance in the tournament for the first time in their history.

===== Qualification =====
====== First round ======
In the first round, Kenya was to face DR Congo over two legs, to be played on 4–6 March and 18–20 March. However, Kenya received a walkover and advanced to the second round after DR Congo withdrew from the competition.

====== Second round ======
In the second round, Kenya faced Algeria over two legs, played on 8 and 12 April. They qualified for the final tournament after drawing 3–3 on aggregate, but winning through the away goals rule.

8 April 2016	Algeria	2–2	Kenya	Bologhine, Algiers
17:00 UTC+1	Bouhenni-Benziane 28', 89'	Report	Sekouane 78' (o.g.); Adoum 84'	Stadium: Stade Omar Hamadi; Attendance: 1,000; Referee: Alcidia Maria Silva dos Santos (Cape Verde)

12 April 2016	Kenya	1–1	Algeria	Kasarani, Nairobi
15:00 UTC+3	Mango 75'	Report	Bouhenni-Benziane 22'	Stadium: Moi International Sports Centre; Referee: Suavis Iratunga (Burundi)

3–3 on aggregate. Kenya qualify for final tournament on away goals.

===== Group stage =====
The draw for the 2016 Africa Women Cup of Nations took place on 18 September 2016 in Yaoundé, Cameroon. Kenya were drawn in Group B alongside Nigeria, Mali and Ghana, but exited the tournament after finishing fourth with no points from their 3 matches.

Pos	Team	Pld	W	D	L	GF	GA	GD	Pts	Qualification
1	Nigeria	3	2	1	0	11	1	+10	7	Knockout stage
2	Ghana	3	2	1	0	7	3	+4	7	Knockout stage
3	Mali	3	1	0	2	4	10	−6	3	
4	Kenya	3	0	0	3	2	10	−8	0	

Source: CAF (archived)
Rules for classification: Group stage tiebreakers

20 November 2016	Ghana	3–1	Kenya	Limbe, Southwest
19:00	Suleman 50'; Addo 72', 90+1'	Report	Akida 23'	Stadium: Stade Municipal de Limbe; Referee: Jeanne Ekoumou (Cameroon)

23 November 2016	Kenya	1–3	Mali	Limbe, Southwest
19:00	Avilia 80'	Report	Coulibaly 36'; Touré 50', 62' (pen.)	Stadium: Stade Municipal de Limbe; Referee: Salma Mukansanga (Rwanda)

26 November 2016	Kenya	0–4	Nigeria	Limbe, Southwest
19:00		Report	Okobi 3'; Ikidi 7'; Oshoala 53'; Oparanozie 89'	Stadium: Stade Municipal de Limbe; Referee: Letticia Antonella Viana (Swaziland)

=== Men's under-20 ===
==== Africa U-20 Cup of Nations qualification ====
The men's national under-20 team participated in qualification for the 2017 Africa U-20 Cup of Nations.

===== First round =====
In the first round, Kenya was facing Sudan over two legs, to be played on 3 and 23 April. However, on 20 April, the Confederation of African Football (CAF) announced Kenya's disqualification for fielding five players born before January 1997 in the first leg.

3 April 2016	Sudan	1–1	Kenya	Al-Arda, Khartoum
20:00 UTC+3	Motwakil (?)	Report	Nondi (?)	Stadium: Al-Merrikh Stadium; Referee: Biruk Kassaun (Ethiopia)

23 April 2016	Kenya	Cancelled	Sudan	Madaraka Estate, Nairobi
15:00 UTC+3		Report		Stadium: Nyayo National Stadium; Referee: Mahmoud Zakaria El Banna (Egypt)

Kenya disqualified from competition. Sudan advance to second round.

=== Boys' under-17 ===
==== Africa U-17 Cup of Nations qualification ====
The boys' national under-17 team participated in qualification for the 2017 Africa U-17 Cup of Nations.

===== First round =====
In the first round, Kenya was to face Malawi over two legs, to be played on 24 June and 1 July. However, the Football Association of Malawi announced that their team withdrew from the competition, allowing Kenya to progress to the second round by default.

===== Second round =====
In the second round, Kenya faced Cameroon over two legs, played on 5 and 20 August. They were eliminated after losing 9–1 on aggregate.

5 August 2016	Cameroon	7–0	Kenya	Limbe, Southwest
15:00 UTC+1	Sakava 9'; Zobo 10'; Bella 34', 67'; Abessolo 39'; Ndzie 45', 50'	Match report News report		Stadium: Stade Municipal de Limbe; Referee: Ruzindana Nsoro (Rwanda)

20 August 2016	Kenya	1–2	Cameroon	Kasarani, Nairobi
15:00 UTC+3	Machaka 11'	Report	Zobo 56'; Abessolo 71'	Stadium: Moi International Sports Centre; Referee: Farah Aden Ali (Djibouti)

==== COSAFA Under-17 Championship ====
Kenya was invited to participate in the 5th edition of the COSAFA Cup, which is being hosted by Mauritius and ran from 22 to 31 July. They finished fourth in the competition after losing 2–0 to Malawi in the third place playoff.

Pos	Team	Pld	W	D	L	GF	GA	GD	Pts	Qualification
1	Zambia	3	3	0	0	10	0	+10	9	Disqualified (Note: Zambia was disqualified from the competition for fielding two over-age players during the tournament.)
2	Malawi	3	2	0	1	7	4	+3	6	Advance to semi-finals
3	Kenya	3	1	0	2	2	10	−8	3	Advance to semi-finals
4	Madagascar	3	0	0	3	2	7	−5	0	

Updated to match(es) played on 26 July 2016. Source: COSAFA
Notes:

22 July 2016	Zambia	4–0	Kenya	Stade St Francois Xavier, Port Louis
12:00	Mulilo 4', 13'; Kola 37'; Nkandu 43'	Report		Referee: Christopher Harrison (South Africa)

24 July 2016	Kenya	2–1	Madagascar	Stade St Francois Xavier, Port Louis
12:00	Mukuria 25', 41' (pen.)	Report	Mosa 20' (pen.)	Referee: Patrice Milazar (Mauritius)

26 July 2016	Malawi	5–0	Kenya	Stade St Francois Xavier, Port Louis
15:00	Chizuze 19'; P. Banda 52', 59', 89'; Madinga 64'	Report		Referee: Andofetra Rakotojaona (Madagascar)

Knockout stage bracket

Semi-finals
29 July
South Africa	4
Kenya	0
29 July
Malawi	1 (5)
Namibia	1 (6)

Final
29 July
South Africa	1 (1)
Namibia	1 (3)
Third place
29 July
Kenya	0
Malawi	2

29 July 2016 Semi-finals	South Africa	4–0	Kenya	Stade George V, Curepipe
13:00	Mkhize 10'; Le Roux 29'; Mchilizeli 36'; Dladla 73'	Report		Referee: Patrice Milazar (Mauritius)

31 July 2016 Third place playoff	Kenya	0–2	Malawi	Stade George V, Curepipe
13:00		report	P. Banda 58'; Madinga 87'	Referee: Keren Treddy Yocette (Seychelles)
