= 2013 KPL Top 8 Cup =

Tournament details
- Country: Kenya
- Teams: 8

Final positions
- Champions: Tusker (2nd title)
- Runners-up: Thika United

Tournament statistics
- Matches played: 9
- Goals scored: 18 (2 per match)
- Top goal scorer(s): Ismail Salim (3 goals) (Note: Goals scored during penalty shoot-outs are not counted.)

The 2013 KPL Top 8 Cup was the third edition of the tournament, which was originally scheduled to run from 3 April to 2 June 2013, but had the date of its final changed to 24 July. It was contested by the top 8 teams of the 2012 Kenyan Premier League season: A.F.C. Leopards, Chemelil Sugar, Gor Mahia, Mathare United, Sofapaka, Thika United, Tusker and Ulinzi Stars.

Gor Mahia were the defending champions, having won their first title the previous season, but were eliminated by eventual champions Tusker in the semi-finals, who beat Thika United to clinch their first title.

== 2012 Kenyan Premier League standings ==
Top 8
Pos	Team	Pld	W	D	L	GF	GA	GD	Pts	Qualification or relegation
1	Tusker (C, Q)	30	17	9	4	39	14	+25	60	Qualification for 2013 CAF Champions League
2	Gor Mahia (Q)	30	17	8	5	37	18	+19	59	Qualification for 2013 CAF Confederation Cup (Note: Gor Mahia qualified for the 2013 CAF Confederation Cup as winners of the 2012 FKF President's Cup.)
3	A.F.C. Leopards	30	17	6	7	45	27	+18	57	
4	Sofapaka	30	13	9	8	34	24	+10	48	
5	Thika United	30	12	10	8	36	33	+3	46	
6	Ulinzi Stars	30	13	6	11	35	29	+6	45	
7	Chemelil Sugar	30	9	14	7	18	17	+1	41	
8	Mathare United	30	10	11	9	36	36	0	41	

Updated to match(es) played on 10 November 2012. Source: Kenyan Premier League
Rules for classification: 1) points; 2) goal difference; 3) number of goals scored.
(C) Champions; (Q) Qualified for the phase indicated

== Bracket ==
Quarterfinals
Sofapaka	1 (3)
Thika United	1 (5)
Chemelil Sugar	3
A.F.C. Leopards	2
Ulinzi Stars	0 (2)
Gor Mahia	0 (4)
Tusker	3
Mathare United	1

Semifinals
Thika United	0	1	1 (3)
Chemelil Sugar	1	0	1 (2)
Gor Mahia	0	0	0
Tusker	1	0	0

Finals
Thika United	2 (3)
Tusker	2 (5)

== Quarter-finals ==
The draw for the quarter-finals was held on 27 March, and the ties were played on 3, 10, 17 and 24 April.

During the fixture between Chemelil Sugar and A.F.C. Leopards on 17 April, fans of the latter stormed onto the pitch claiming that their players were being unfairly treated by match officials during the 90th minute. Police were forced to intervene and take players and match officials off the pitch, and the match was abandoned with Chemelil Sugar winning 3–2. The KPL ruled Chemelil Sugar winners of the match and therefore qualified to the semi-finals.

=== Fixtures ===
3 April 2013	Sofapaka	1 – 1 (3 – 5 p)	Thika United	Madaraka, Nairobi
20:00 UTC+3	Tarumbwa 89'	Report	Odera 90' (pen.)	Stadium: Nyayo National Stadium
	Penalties
	Monday (penalty missed); J. Baraza (penalty scored); Owino (penalty scored); Tarumbwa (penalty scored)		(penalty scored) Odera; (penalty scored) Mbugua; (penalty scored) Glay; (penalty scored) Miheso; (penalty scored) Omino

10 April 2013	Ulinzi Stars	0 – 0 (2 – 4 p)	Gor Mahia	Madaraka, Nairobi
18:00 UTC+3		Report		Stadium: Nyayo National Stadium
	Penalties
	Apul (penalty scored); Ochola (penalty missed); Nandwa (penalty missed); Mulinge (penalty scored)		(penalty scored) K. Omondi; (penalty scored) Mosoti; (penalty missed) Odhiambo; (penalty scored) Salim; (penalty scored) Sserunkuma

17 April 2013	Chemelil Sugar	3 – 2	A.F.C. Leopards	Madaraka, Nairobi
19:00 UTC+3	Murage 24', 26'; Ochieng 80'; V. Omondi (yellow card) 83'	(abandoned); Report	E. Wafula (yellow card) 31' (red card) 48'; N. Wafula 36'; Imbalambala 60'; Were (yellow card) 90'	Stadium: Nyayo National Stadium

24 April 2013	Tusker	3 – 1	Mathare United	Madaraka, Nairobi
19:00 UTC+3	J. Were 9'; Olunga 36'; Okoth (yellow card) 42'; I. Salim 58'; Tololwa (yellow card) 60'	Report	Karani 80'	Stadium: Nyayo National Stadium

== Semi-finals ==
The semi-finals are being played over two legs on a home-and-away basis on 1, 8, 15 and 23 May.

=== First leg ===
The first leg ties of the semi-finals were played on 1 and 8 May.

==== Fixtures ====
1 May 2013	Thika United	0 – 1	Chemelil Sugar	Madaraka, Nairobi
19:00 UTC+3	Opondo (yellow card) 68'	Report	Ouko (yellow card) 69'; Mwita 77'	Stadium: Nyayo National Stadium

8 May 2013	Gor Mahia	0 – 1	Tusker	Madaraka, Nairobi
19:00 UTC+3	Anguyo (yellow card) 18'	Report	Omunuk 40'; Okoth (yellow card) 60'	Stadium: Nyayo National Stadium

=== Second leg ===
The second leg ties of the semi-finals were played on 15 and 23 May.

==== Fixtures ====
15 May 2013	Chemelil Sugar	0 – 1 (2 – 3 p)	Thika United	Madaraka, Nairobi
16:00 UTC+3		Report	Kingatua 90'	Stadium: Nyayo National Stadium
	Penalties
	Mwaniki (penalty scored); Okumu (penalty missed); V. Omondi (penalty missed); Ouko (penalty scored); Indimuli (penalty missed)		(penalty scored) V. Otieno; (penalty scored) Meja; (penalty missed) Miheso; (penalty missed) Mbugua; (penalty scored) Omino

1–1 on aggregate. Thika United won through a penalty shoot-out.

22 May 2013	Tusker	0 – 0	Gor Mahia	Madaraka, Nairobi
19:00 UTC+3	Awisho (yellow card) 28'	Report	Mosoti (yellow card) 26'; D. Otieno (yellow card) 45'	Stadium: Nyayo National Stadium

Tusker won 1–0 on aggregate.

== Final ==
The final will be played on 24 July.

24 July 2013	Thika United	2 – 2 (3 – 5 p)	Tusker	Shauri Moyo, Nairobi
15:00 UTC+3	Kingatua 16', 87'	Report	I. Salim 20' (pen.), 78'; Khamis (yellow card) 31'; Awisho (yellow card) 38'	Stadium: Nairobi City Stadium
	Penalties
	V. Otieno (penalty scored); Odera (penalty missed); Mejja (penalty scored); Mbugua (penalty scored)		(penalty scored) I. Salim; (penalty scored) S. Odhiambo; (penalty scored) Abondo; (penalty scored) C. Okoth; (penalty scored) Awisho

== Top scorers ==
Rank	Player	Club	Goals
1	(Kenya) Ismail Salim	Tusker	3
2	(Kenya) David Kingatua	Thika United	2
2	(Kenya) Daniel Murage	Chemelil Sugar	2
4	(Kenya) Martin Imbalambala	A.F.C. Leopards	1
4	(Kenya) Meshack Karani	Mathare United	1
4	(Kenya) John Mwita	Chemelil Sugar	1
4	(Kenya) Tony Ochieng	Chemelil Sugar	1
4	(Kenya) Ezekiel Odera	Thika United	1
4	(Kenya) Michael Olunga	Tusker	1
4	(Uganda) Robert Omunuk	Tusker	1
4	(Zimbabwe) Obadiah Tarumbwa	Sofapaka	1
4	(Kenya) Noah Wafula	A.F.C. Leopards	1
4	(Kenya) Jesse Were	Tusker	1

== Team statistics ==
Pos.	Team	Pld	W	D	L	Pts	APts	GF	AGF	GA	AGA	GD	AGD	CS	ACS	YC	AYC	RC	ARC
1	Tusker	4	2	2	0	8	2.00	6	1.50	3	0.75	+3	0.75	2	0.50	6	1.50	0	0.00
2	Thika United	4	1	2	1	5	1.25	4	1.00	4	1.00	0	0.00	1	0.25	1	0.25	0	0.00
**Eliminated in the semi-finals**
3	Chemelil Sugar	3	2	0	1	6	2.00	4	1.33	3	1.00	+1	0.33	1	0.33	2	0.67	0	0.00
4	Gor Mahia	3	0	2	1	2	0.67	0	0.00	1	0.33	−1	−0.33	2	0.67	3	1.00	0	0.00
**Eliminated in the quarter-finals**
5	Sofapaka	1	0	1	0	1	1.00	1	1.00	1	1.00	0	0.00	0	0.00	0	0.00	0	0.00
6	Ulinzi Stars	1	0	1	0	1	1.00	0	0.00	0	0.00	0	0.00	1	1.00	0	0.00	0	0.00
7	A.F.C. Leopards	1	0	0	1	0	0.00	2	2.00	3	3.00	−1	−1.00	0	0.00	3	3.00	1	1.00
8	Mathare United	1	0	0	1	0	0.00	1	1.00	3	3.00	−2	−2.00	0	0.00	0	0.00	0	0.00
Total		9^{(1)}	5	4^{(2)}	5	23	1.28	18	1.00	18	1.00	0	0.00	7	0.39	15	0.83	1	0.06

Updated to games played on 24 July 2013. Team(s) rendered in italics represent(s) the host nation(s). The competition's winning team is rendered in bold.
^{(1)} – Total games lost not counted in total games played (total games lost = total games won)
^{(2)} – Total number of games drawn (tied) for all teams = Total number of games drawn (tied) ÷ 2 (both teams involved)
^{(3)} – As per statistical convention in football, matches decided in extra time are counted as wins and losses, while matches decided by penalty shoot-outs are counted as draws.
