= Michael Olunga =

Kenyan footballer

Personal information
- Full name: Michael Olunga Ogada
- Date of birth: 26 March 1994 (age 32)
- Place of birth: Nairobi, Kenya
- Height: 1.93 m (6 ft 4 in)
- Position: Striker

Team information
- Current team: Al-Arabi
- Number: 14

Senior career*
Years	Team	Apps	(Gls)
2012–2016	Liberty Sports Academy	?	(32)
2013	→ Tusker (loan)	18	(2)
2014	→ Thika United (loan)	26	(9)
2015	→ Gor Mahia (loan)	27	(19)
2016	Djurgårdens IF	27	(12)
2017–2018	Guizhou Zhicheng	9	(2)
2017–2018	→ Girona (loan)	14	(3)
2018–2021	Kashiwa Reysol	72	(58)
2021–2025	Al-Duhail	88	(79)
2025–	Al-Arabi	11	(6)

International career^{‡}
2015–	Kenya	71	(35)
- * Club domestic league appearances and goals as of 17 January 2026 ‡ National team caps and goals as of 17:32, 17 November 2026 (UTC)

Michael Olunga Ogada (born 26 March 1994) is a Kenyan professional footballer who plays as a striker and captains Qatar Stars League Side Al-Arabi and the Kenya national team.

== Club career ==
=== Early career and Gor Mahia ===
While still a student at the Upper Hill School, Olunga began his career with the Liberty Sports Academy in the Nairobi County League. He scored 32 goals for the side during the 2012 season, helping them finish the season unbeaten and earn promotion to the Nairobi Provincial League. He made headlines when he scored seven goals in a single match helping his team to an 8–0 win.

Initially reported to be attending trials in France, Olunga signed for Kenyan Premier League side Tusker on a one-year loan deal from Liberty on 19 December 2012.

After finishing the 2013 season with two goals for Tusker, Olunga was loaned to fellow Premier League side Thika United for another year, before joining Gor Mahia ahead of the 2015 season. He finished the season as the club's top scorer in the league with 19 goals to help the side win a record 15th league title without losing a single match, including the second goal in a 2–0 win over Muhoroni Youth on their final league match of the season.

=== Djurgården ===
On 17 February 2016, Olunga joined Swedish side Djurgårdens IF on a four-year contract, after joining the team's pre-season training camp on trial. He scored his first two goals for Djurgården on 8 August 2016 against IFK Göteborg in a 3–1 win. He was also named man of the match and Djurgården coach Mark Dempsey praised him for his match winning heroics. In the next match Olunga scored once again in the 2–2 draw versus IF Elfsborg at the Tele2 Arena. On 27 August, he scored the match-winning goal against Gefle IF with a volley in the 86th minute. In the last 12 games of the Allsvenskan Olunga scored 12 goals which earned him a fifth place in the Allsvenskan top scorer table. He was nominated for Newcomer of the year in Swedish football by a jury of Allsvenskan coaches and Swedish journalists as well as the coaches of the Swedish national teams. The award later went to Alexander Isak.

On 10 November 2016, Kenyan football site Soka reported that Djurgården had turned down offers on Olunga from La Liga side Betis, Lokeren, Belgian champions Club Brugge and Swedish champions Malmö FF.

=== Guizhou Zhicheng ===
In 2017, Olunga joined Chinese club Guizhou Zhicheng.

==== Girona (loan) ====
On 1 September 2017, Olunga was loaned to La Liga side Girona FC, for one year. On 13 January 2018, he made his La Liga debut against Las Palmas scoring a hat-trick in the span of 22 minutes during a 6–0 win, becoming both the first Kenyan player and the first Girona player to score a hat-trick in La Liga.

=== Kashiwa Reysol ===
On 10 August 2018, Olunga joined Japanese club Kashiwa Reysol.

On 24 November 2019, he scored eight goals for Kashiwa in a 13–1 victory over Kyoto Sanga. Olunga finished the season with 27 league goals as Kashiwa finished the J2 season as champions and won promotion to the first division.

In J1 League play on 26 July 2020, Olunga scored a hat-trick against Vegalta Sendai; the match finished in a 5–1 victory.

Olunga finished as the top scorer in the 2020 Japanese J1 League with 28 goals, winning the Golden Boot and the J-League 2020 MVP. He is the first African player to win the J-league MVP award.

=== Al-Duhail ===
In January 2021, Olunga moved to Qatar Stars League champions Al-Duhail on a three-season contract, for a reported transfer fee of €6 million.

He made his debut for the club on 12 January, in a 3–1 away loss against Al Sadd. On 25 January 2021, Olunga scored a hat-trick in Duhail's 6–0 win against Al Ahli in the Emir of Qatar Cup. Olunga finished as the top scorer of the 2021 AFC Champions League, but Al-Duhail crashed out of the competition after a 1–1 draw with team Al Ahli Saudi in late April. and Esteghlal qualified as group winners.

On 8 May 2023, Olunga and his club secured the 2022–23 Qatar Stars League title, scoring four goals in a 5–2 defeat of Al-Shamal.

== International career ==
Olunga made his debut for the Kenya national team in a friendly against Seychelles at the Stade Linité in Victoria on 28 March 2015. He scored his first goal for the Harambee Stars in a friendly against South Sudan which resulted in a 2–0 win. On 27 July 2019, during the 2019 AFCON Olunga scored a double to complete a comeback against Tanzania.

== Personal life ==
Olunga studied geospatial engineering at the Technical University of Kenya and pursued a Bachelor of Engineering degree. For this reason, he is regularly known as "The Engineer" by Kenyan football fans. He has stated that he looks up to Dutch striker Robin van Persie as a role model.

== Career statistics ==
=== Club ===
As of match played 13 September 2025

Appearances and goals by club, season and competition
Club	Season	League			National cup (Note: Includes FKF President's Cup, Svenska Cupen, Copa del Rey, Emir of Qatar Cup)		League cup (Note: Includes J.League Cup, Qatar Cup)		Continental		Other		Total	
Club	Season	Division	Apps	Goals	Apps	Goals	Apps	Goals	Apps	Goals	Apps	Goals	Apps	Goals
Upper Hill School	2012	National KSSSA		5	—		—		—		—			5
Liberty Sports Academy	2012	Nairobi County Champions		32	—		—		—		—			32
Tusker	2013	Kenyan Premier League	18	2	—		—		2	0	—		20	2
Thika United	2014	Kenyan Premier League	26	9	—		—		—		—		26	9
Gor Mahia	2015	Kenyan Premier League	27	19		2		5 (Note: Goals in Kagame Interclub Cup)	2	0		3 (Note: Goals in KPL Top 8 Cup)		29
Djurgården	2016	Allsvenskan	27	12	1	0	—		—		4	1	32	13
Guizhou	2017	Chinese Super League	9	2	0	0	—		—		—		9	2
Girona (loan)	2017–18	La Liga	14	3	2	0	—		—		—		16	3
Kashiwa Reysol	2018	J1 League	10	3	—		0	0	—		—		10	3
Kashiwa Reysol	2019	J2 League	30	27	0	0	3	2	—		—		33	29
Kashiwa Reysol	2020	J1 League	32	28	—		3	1	—		—		35	29
Kashiwa Reysol	Total		72	58	0	0	6	3	0	0	0	0	78	61
Al-Duhail	2020–21	Qatar Stars League	9	6	3 (Note: Appearances in Emir of Qatar Cup)	5	2 (Note: Appearances in Qatar Cup)	0	6 (Note: Appearances in AFC Champions League)	9	2 (Note: Appearances in FIFA Club World Cup)	0	22	20
Al-Duhail	2021–22	Qatar Stars League	20	24	4	2	0	0	5	4	—		29	30
Al-Duhail	2022–23	Qatar Stars League	22	22	1	0	2	2	3	2	5 (Note: Appearances in Qatari Stars Cup)	10	39	36
Al-Duhail	2023–24	Qatar Stars League	18	15	3	3	1	0	5	4	1	0	27	22
Al-Duhail	2024–25	Qatar Stars League	19	12	2	3	1	1	–		2	1	24	17
Al-Duhail	Total		88	79	13	13	6	3	19	19	10	11	136	125
Al-Arabi SC	2025–26	Qatar Stars League	4	2	–		–		–		–		4	2
Career total			285+	223	16+	15	12	12	23	19	14+	15	350	284

=== International ===
Scores and results list Kenya's goal tally first, score column indicates score after each Olunga goal.

List of international goals scored by Michael Olunga
No.	Date	Venue	Opponent	Score	Result	Competition
1	7 June 2015	Amahoro Stadium, Kigali, Rwanda	South Sudan	2–0	2–0	Friendly
2	30 May 2015	National Heroes Stadium, Lusaka, Zambia	Zambia	1–0	1–2	2017 Africa Cup of Nations qualification
3	7 October 2015	Stade Anjalay, Belle Vue Maurel, Mauritius	Mauritius	5–2	5–2	2018 FIFA World Cup qualification
4	13 November 2015	Nairobi City Stadium, Nairobi, Kenya	Cape Verde	1–0	1–0	2018 FIFA World Cup qualification
5	22 November 2015	Addis Ababa Stadium, Addis Ababa, Ethiopia	Uganda	2–0	2–0	2015 CECAFA Cup
6	25 November 2015	Awassa Kenema Stadium, Awassa, Ethiopia	Burundi	1–1	1–1	2015 CECAFA Cup
7	4 October 2016	Stade des Martyrs, Kinshasa, DR Congo	DR Congo	1–0	1–0	Friendly
8	23 March 2017	Kenyatta Stadium, Machakos, Kenya	Uganda	1–0	1–1	Friendly
9	26 March 2017	Kenyatta Stadium, Machakos, Kenya	DR Congo	1–0	2–1	Friendly
10	26 March 2017	Kenyatta Stadium, Machakos, Kenya	DR Congo	2–1	2–1	Friendly
11	10 June 2017	National Stadium, Freetown, Sierra Leone	Sierra Leone	1–2	1–2	2019 Africa Cup of Nations qualification
12	5 October 2017	Basra Sports City, Basra, Iraq	Iraq	1–2	1–2	Friendly
13	27 March 2018	Stade de Marrakech, Marrakesh, Morocco	Central African Republic	2–3	2–3	Friendly
14	14 October 2018	Moi International Sports Centre, Nairobi, Kenya	Ethiopia	1–0	3–0	2019 Africa Cup of Nations qualification
15	15 June 2019	Centro Deportivo Santa Ana, Madrid, Spain	DR Congo	1–0	1–1	Friendly
16	27 June 2019	30 June Stadium, Cairo, Egypt	Tanzania	1–1	3–2	2019 Africa Cup of Nations
17	27 June 2019	30 June Stadium, Cairo, Egypt	Tanzania	3–2	3–2	2019 Africa Cup of Nations
18	14 November 2019	Borg El Arab Stadium, Alexandria, Egypt	Egypt	1–1	1–1	2021 Africa Cup of Nations qualification
19	5 September 2021	Nyamirambo Regional Stadium, Kigali, Rwanda	Rwanda	1–0	1–1	2022 FIFA World Cup qualification
20	11 November 2021	St. Mary's Stadium-Kitende, Entebbe, Uganda	Uganda	1–0	1–1	2022 FIFA World Cup qualification
21	15 November 2021	Nyayo National Stadium, Nairobi, Kenya	Rwanda	1–0	2–1	2022 FIFA World Cup qualification
22	28 March 2023	Azadi Stadium, Tehran, Iran	Iran	1–0	1–2	Friendly
23	20 November 2023	Felix Houphouet Boigny Stadium, Abidjan, Ivory Coast	Seychelles	1–0	5–0	2026 FIFA World Cup qualification
24	20 November 2023	Felix Houphouet Boigny Stadium, Abidjan, Ivory Coast	Seychelles	2–0	5–0	2026 FIFA World Cup qualification
25	23 March 2024	Bingu National Stadium, Lilongwe, Malawi	Malawi	1–0	4–0	2024 Four Nations Football Tournament
26	23 March 2024	Bingu National Stadium, Lilongwe, Malawi	Malawi	2–0	4–0	2024 Four Nations Football Tournament
27	26 March 2024	Bingu National Stadium, Lilongwe, Malawi	Zimbabwe	1–1	3–1	2024 Four Nations Football Tournament
28	26 March 2024	Bingu National Stadium, Lilongwe, Malawi	Zimbabwe	2–1	3–1	2024 Four Nations Football Tournament
29	26 March 2024	Bingu National Stadium, Lilongwe, Malawi	Zimbabwe	3–1	3–1	2024 Four Nations Football Tournament
30	11 October 2024	Japoma Stadium, Douala, Cameroon	Cameroon	1–2	1–4	2025 Africa Cup of Nations qualification
31	20 March 2025	Alassane Ouattara Stadium, Abidjan, Ivory Coast	Gambia	1–2	3–3	2026 FIFA World Cup qualification
32	23 March 2025	Nyayo National Stadium, Nairobi, Kenya	Gabon	1–2	1–2	2026 FIFA World Cup qualification
33	9 September 2025	Moi International Sports Centre, Nairobi, Kenya	Seychelles	4–0	5–0	2026 FIFA World Cup qualification
34	9 September 2025	Moi International Sports Centre, Nairobi, Kenya	Seychelles	5–0	5–0	2026 FIFA World Cup qualification
35	13 November 2026	Orlando Stadium, Johannesburg, South Africa	South Africa	1–1	2–2	2027 Africa Cup of Nations qualification

== Honours ==
Tusker

- Kenyan Super Cup: 2013
- KPL Top 8 Cup: 2013

Gor Mahia

- Kenyan Premier League: 2014, 2015
- Kenyan Super Cup: 2015
- KPL Top 8 Cup: 2015

Kashiwa Reysol

- J2 League: 2019

Al-Duhail

- Qatar Stars League: 2022–23
- Qatari Stars Cup: 2022–23, 2024–25
- Emir Cup: 2022

Individual

- Kenyan Sportperson of the Year: 2021
- AFC Champions League Top scorer: 2021
- Kenyan Premier League Player of the Year: 2015
- J.League Player of the Year: 2020
- J.League Top scorer: 2020
- J.League Best XI: 2020
- Qatar Stars League Top scorer: 2021–22, 2022–23
- Qatar Stars League Player of the Month: October 2021, November 2021
- Qatari Starts Cup Top scorer: 2022–23
- AFC Champions League Team of the Tournament: 2022
