= Aboud Omar =

Kenyan footballer

Personal information
- Full name: Aboud Omar Khamis
- Date of birth: 9 September 1992 (age 34)
- Place of birth: Mombasa, Kenya
- Height: 1.75 m (5 ft 9 in)
- Position: Left-back

Senior career*
Years	Team	Apps	(Gls)
2010–2013	Admiral	38	(8)
2011–2013	→ Bandari (loan)	63	(5)
2013–2015	Tusker	73	(3)
2015–2016	Panegialios	14	(0)
2016–2018	Slavia Sofia	59	(0)
2018	Cercle Brugge	8	(0)
2019	Sepsi OSK	8	(0)
2020–2021	Ionikos	22	(2)
2021–2022	AEL	20	(0)
2022–	Kenya Police	0	(0)

International career^{‡}
2013–	Kenya	41	(0)
- * Club domestic league appearances and goals as of 22:30, 25 May 2022 (UTC) ‡ National team caps and goals as of 17:00, 16 December 2021 (UTC)

Aboud Omar (born 9 September 1992) is a Kenyan professional footballer who last played as a left-back for Kenyan Premier League club Kenya Police and the Kenya national team.

== Career ==
Born in Mombasa, Aboud Omar began his career at local side Admiral in the second tier of Kenyan football. In early 2011, he was loaned to Kenyan Premier League club Bandari.

In June 2013, Omar joined Kenyan Premier League defending Champions Tusker where he won 2013 Kenyan Super Cup (post-season).

After two years at Tusker, Omar signed with Greek club Panegialios in August 2015. He made his debut in a 0–0 home draw against Acharnaikos on 27 September. Omar played half of the season, appearing 15 times in the league.

=== Slavia Sofia ===
On 9 February 2016, Omar signed a contract with Bulgarian side Slavia Sofia, after a successful trial period with the club. He made his competitive debut against Botev Plovdiv on 3 March, playing the full 90 minutes. As a result, he became the first Kenyan footballer to play in the Bulgarian top league.

On 30 June 2016, Omar marked his European debut with an assist for a Serder Serderov goal in a 1–0 home win against Zagłębie Lubin in their 2016–17 Europa League first qualifying round first leg tie.

On 20 April 2018, Omar was sacked by Slavia with immediate effect. In a statement, Slavia president Ventseslav Stefanov alleged that Omar had insulted his teammates and disrespected Bulgaria. Omar said he wanted to refer the matter to FIFA.

=== Cercle Brugge ===
On 15 June 2018, Omar signed with Belgian club Cercle Brugge.

== Career statistics ==
=== International ===
He made his debut on 9 July 2013.

As of 1 December 2018

Kenya national team
Year	Apps	Goals
2013	7	0
2014	7	0
2015	2	0
2016	5	0
2017	5	0
2018	6	0
Total	32	0

== Honours ==
=== Club ===
Bandari

- Labour Day Cup: 2013

Tusker

- Kenyan Super Cup: 2013
- Kenyan Super Cup: 2014
- Kenya Top 8 Cup: 2013
- Kenya Top 8 Cup: 2014

Slavia Sofia

- Bulgarian Cup: 2017–18

Ionikos

- Super League Greece 2: 2020–21

=== International ===
Kenya

- CECAFA Senior Challenge Cup: 2013
