= Andrew Murunga =

Kenyan footballer (born 1995)

Personal information
- Full name: Andrew Murunga
- Date of birth: 20 October 1995 (age 31)
- Position: Striker

Team information
- Current team: Kakamega Homeboyz

Youth career
- –2010: NYTA Nairobi
- 2010–2011: Gor Mahia
- 2011: Bandari

Senior career*
Years	Team	Apps	(Gls)
2011–2012	Tusker	–	(–)
2012–2013	Karuturi Sports	11	(6)
2013–2014	Tusker	5	(0)
2014	→ KCB (loan)	14	(0)
2014–2015	F.C. Talanta		
2016–2017	Kakamega Homeboyz	15	(5)
2018-	Vihiga United		

International career^{‡}
2013–	Kenya	6	(1)
- * Club domestic league appearances and goals as of 08 August 2016 ‡ National team caps and goals as of 08 August 2016

Andrew Murunga (born 20 October 1995) is a Kenyan footballer who plays for Kenyan Premier League side Vihiga United as a striker. He made his debut for the Kenya national football team on 5 June 2013 in a 2014 FIFA World Cup qualification match against Nigeria.

== Club career ==
On 27 June 2010, Murunga joined Gor Mahia from the National Youth Talent Academy based in Nairobi. After spending a year with the former champions, Murunga joined Bandari. He spent 6 months with the Coastal club before joining Tusker on 21 December 2011.

After moving to Tusker, Murunga had a relatively unsuccessful year with the champions, playing regularly but not managing to a score a single goal throughout the entire 2012 season. He was released by the club on 5 December 2012. On 22 February 2013, Naivasha club Karuturi Sports revealed their new signings for the 2013 season, with Murunga included in the list and given the squad number 28. He managed to score 6 goals in 11 league appearances for the club, and was even named man of the match for his performance away to Ulinzi Stars at the Afraha Stadium in Nakuru on 28 April 2013, in which he provided an assist for Mohammed Mwachiponi in the 59th minute.

Following his good performances in the league, Murunga rejoined his former club Tusker on 17 June 2013, for a transfer window record fee of KSh.100,000/=. On 8 January 2014, Murunga signed a season-long loan deal with Kenya Commercial Bank ahead of the 2014 season. On 22 August 2014, it was announced that Murunga joined F.C. Talanta in the Kenyan National Super League.

On 13 January 2016, Murunga joined newly promoted Kakamega Homeboyz ahead of the 2016 season, becoming the club's fourth signing of the window after David Juma (Gor Mahia), Martin Imbalambala (A.F.C. Leopards) and Mike Khaduli (Muhoroni Youth).

== International career ==
Murunga made his debut for Kenya on 5 June 2013 in a 2014 FIFA World Cup qualification match against Nigeria, coming on as an 89th-minute substitute for club team-mate David Ochieng. In his second international game against Malawi, Murunga scored his debut goal to level the score at 1–1 in the 53rd minute, helping his country to a 2–2 away at the Kamuzu Stadium in Blantyre.
