= 2011 KPL Top 8 Cup =

Tournament details
- Country: Kenya
- Teams: 8

Final positions
- Champions: Ulinzi Stars
- Runner-up: Western Stima

Tournament statistics
- Matches played: 9
- Goals scored: 18 (2 per match)
- Top goal scorer(s): Bob Mugalia; Ali Bai (2 goals each)

The 2011 KPL Top 8 Cup was the inaugural edition of the tournament, which was contested by the top 8 teams of the 2010 Kenyan Premier League season: Gor Mahia, Karuturi Sports, Mathare United, Sofapaka, Sony Sugar, Tusker F.C., Ulinzi Stars (eventual winners) and Western Stima. All matches were played at the Nyayo National Stadium.

== 2010 Kenyan Premier League standings ==
Top 8
Pos	Team	Pld	W	D	L	GF	GA	GD	Pts	Qualification or relegation
1	Ulinzi Stars (C, Q)	30	16	11	3	37	16	+21	59	Qualification for 2011 CAF Champions League
2	Gor Mahia	30	15	11	4	33	15	+18	56	
3	Tusker	30	14	11	5	35	19	+16	53	
4	Sofapaka (Q)	30	11	14	5	39	23	+16	47	Qualification for 2011 CAF Confederation Cup (Note: Sofapaka as winners of the 2010 FKL Cup qualified for the 2011 CAF Confederation Cup.)
5	Sony Sugar	30	11	8	11	26	26	0	41	
6	Mathare United	30	7	18	5	31	28	+3	39	
7	Karuturi Sports	30	9	11	10	22	24	−2	38	
8	Western Stima	30	9	11	10	28	31	−3	38	

Updated to match(es) played on 8 December 2010. Source: 2010 Kenyan Premier League
Rules for classification: 1) points; 2) goal difference; 3) number of goals scored.
(C) Champions; (Q) Qualified for the phase indicated

== Bracket ==
Quarterfinals
Mathare United	0
Gor Mahia	2
Ulinzi Stars	2
Karuturi Sports	0
Tusker	0
Western Stima	1
Sofapaka	2
Sony Sugar	1

Semifinals
Gor Mahia	0	0	0
Ulinzi Stars	0	1	1
Western Stima	1	2	3 (2)
Sofapaka	1	2	3 (1)

Finals
Ulinzi Stars	2
Western Stima	1

== Quarter-finals ==
The quarter-final ties were played between 9 March and 13 April 2011.

9 March 2011	Tusker	0–1	Western Stima	Nyayo National Stadium
20:00 UTC+3		Report	Nyarombo 75'

6 April 2011	Ulinzi Stars	2–0	Karuturi Sports	Nyayo National Stadium
15:00 UTC+3		Report

6 April 2011	Mathare United	0–2	Gor Mahia	Nyayo National Stadium
19:30 UTC+3		Report

13 April 2011	Sofapaka	2–1	Sony Sugar	Nyayo National Stadium
19:00 UTC+3	Mugalia 82', 88'	Report	Chambiri 90'

== Semi-finals ==
The first leg and second leg of the semi-finals were played between 20 April and 25 May 2011.

=== First leg ===
20 April 2011	Gor Mahia	0–0	Ulinzi Stars	Nyayo National Stadium
19:00 UTC+3		Report

27 April 2011	Western Stima	1–1	Sofapaka	Nyayo National Stadium
15:00 UTC+3	Bai 80'	Report	J. Baraza 14'

=== Second leg ===
18 May 2011	Gor Mahia	0–1	Ulinzi Stars	Nyayo National Stadium
19:00 UTC+3		Report	M. Baraza 38'

25 May 2011	Sofapaka	2–2	Western Stima	Nyayo National Stadium
19:00 UTC+3	Mulama 12'; Njoroge 36'	Report	Chinjili 3'; Bai 63'

Sofapaka 3–3 Western Stima on aggregate. Western Stima won on away goals (2–1).

== Final ==
The final was played on 25 June 2011 between Ulinzi Stars and Western Stima.

25 June 2011	Ulinzi Stars	2–1	Western Stima	Nyayo National Stadium
15:00 UTC+3	Waruru 58'; Amuoka 85'	Report; News	Mangi 38'
