= Victor Ochieng =

Kenyan footballer (born 1991)

Personal information
- Full name: Victor Randiki Ochieng
- Date of birth: 20 March 1991 (age 35)
- Place of birth: Nairobi, Kenya
- Height: 1.68 m (5 ft 6 in)
- Position: Striker

Senior career*
Years	Team	Apps	(Gls)
2010	KCB		
2011	Chemelil Sugar		
2012–2013	A.F.C. Leopards		
2014	SoNy Sugar		
2014–2016	Posta Rangers		
2016	Chemelil Sugar	6	(1)
2017–2018	Western Stima		

International career
2011	Kenya	2	(0)
- * Club domestic league appearances and goals

Victor Randiki Ochieng (born 20 March 1991) is a Kenyan former footballer who played as a striker.

== Career ==
Born in Nairobi, Ochieng played club football for KCB, Chemelil Sugar, A.F.C. Leopards, SoNy Sugar, Posta Rangers and Western Stima.

He earned 2 caps for the Kenyan national team.
