= Charles Odero =

Kenyan football manager (born 1983)

Charles Odero Okumu
Personal information
- Full name: Charles Odero Okumu
- Date of birth: 7 April 1983 (age 43)
- Height: 1.72 m (5 ft 8 in)

Managerial career
- Years: Team
- 2023-: Muhoroni Youth (Head Coach)

Charles Odero Okumu is a former defender currently serving as the head coach at Kenyan Premier League side Muhoroni Youth.

He previously served as head coach at Kenya premiership side Chemelil Sugar, at second-tier side AP Bomet before moving to Wazito FC (later renamed Muhoroni Youth).
