= USFC =

USFC may refer to:

- Ulinzi Stars F.C., a football club in Kenya
- Ulster Senior Football Championship, a Gaelic football competition in Ireland
- United Sikkim F.C., a football club in India
- United States Fish Commission, formally the United States Commission on Fish and Fisheries, a United States Government agency that operated from 1871 to 1940, renamed the United States Bureau of Fisheries in 1903
