= Moses Arita =

Kenyan footballer (born 1991)

Personal information
- Full name: Moses Arita
- Date of birth: 30 November 1991 (age 34)
- Place of birth: Nakuru, Kenya
- Position: Striker

Team information
- Current team: Western Stima Football Club
- Number: 9

Senior career*
Years	Team	Apps	(Gls)
2008–2009	St. Andrews Turi		(18)
2009–2010	Sony Sugar	27	(9)
2010–2011	Thika United	21	(10)
2011–2012	KF Tirana	1	(0)
2012–2013	Thika United	?	(?)
2013	Tusker	?	(?)
2013	Sony Sugar	?	(?)
2014	Thika United		
2014–2015	Ushuru		
2016–	Muhoroni Youth		

International career^{‡}
2011–	Kenya	2	(0)
- * Club domestic league appearances and goals as of 19 December 2015 ‡ National team caps and goals as of 6 June 2013

Moses Arita (born 30 November 1991) is a Kenyan professional footballer who currently plays for Western Stima Football Club in the Kenyan Premier League and the Kenya national team as a striker.

== Career ==
=== Early career ===
Arita was born and raised in Nakuru, where he attended Mama Ngina Primary School, he then went to Manor High School in Rift Valley. After completing high school he joined St. Andrews Turi in Molo in 2008 before moving to Kenyan Premier League side Sony Sugar FC in 2009.

=== Thika United ===
After one season at Sony Sugar, Arita joined Thika United in 2010, where he became an instrumental player in the starting lineup, but it was not until 2011 that he burst into the limelight with his goal-poaching abilities that saw him net 10 goals in 21 games.

=== KF Tirana ===
Following a recommendation from fellow Kenyan and new KF Tirana signing James Situma, Arita signed a three-year contract with Albania's most successful club in August 2011. He moved to KF Tirana on a free transfer from Thika United on the grounds that the Kenyan club will receive 5% of the players next transfer fee.

=== Return to Thika United ===
After a rather unsuccessful season at KF Tirana, Arita returned to Thika United for the 2012 Kenyan Premier League. He made a decision to remain in Kenya after he returned there following visa complications experienced in Albania. He finished the season as his club's second top scorer with 6 goals, behind leader Kepha Aswani, who finished the season as the league's third top scorer with 12 goals.

=== Tusker ===
Arita's success at Thika in 2012 led league champions Tusker and former champions Sofapaka into a race for his signature. After much speculation, Arita finally signed to the former in late December 2012.
