= Wycliffe Ochomo =

Kenyan footballer (born 1990)

Personal information
- Date of birth: 2 August 1990 (age 36)
- Position: Striker

Team information
- Current team: Bandari

Senior career*
Years	Team	Apps	(Gls)
2010	Gor Mahia		
2011	Congo United		
2012–2013	Ulinzi Stars		
2014	Admiral		
2015	Police		
2015–2016	Muhoroni Youth		
2017	Kakamega Homeboyz	18	(4)
2018–	Bandari		

International career^{‡}
2016–	Kenya	2	(0)
- * Club domestic league appearances and goals as of 13:09, 22 January 2019 (UTC) ‡ National team caps and goals as of 13:09, 22 January 2019 (UTC)

Wycliffe Ochomo (born 2 August 1990) is a Kenyan international footballer who plays for Bandari, as a striker.

== Career ==
Ochomo has played club football for Gor Mahia, Congo United, Ulinzi Stars, Admiral, Police, Muhoroni Youth, Kakamega Homeboyz and Bandari.

He made his international debut for Kenya in 2016.
