= Enosh Ochieng =

Kenyan footballer

Personal information
- Full name: Enosh Ochieng
- Date of birth: 1 August 1991 (age 35)
- Place of birth: Kenya
- Height: 1.77 m (5 ft 10 in)
- Position: Striker

Team information
- Current team: Ulinzi
- Number: 25

Senior career*
Years	Team	Apps	(Gls)
2013–2014	Muhoroni Youth F.C.	37	(19)
2015–	Ulinzi	64	(38)
Total		101	(57)

International career^{‡}
2019–	Kenya	2	(0)
- * Club domestic league appearances and goals as of 17 September 2019 ‡ National team caps and goals as of 17 September 2019

Enosh Ochieng (born 1 August 1991) is a Kenyan footballer who plays for Ulinzi in the Kenyan Premier League and also the Kenyan national team.

== Muhoroni Youth ==
Enosh was brought into Muhoroni Youth FC by the then coach Francis Baraza in 2013, he had a good first season scoring 7 goals in 15 appearances, in his second season at Muhoroni, he scored 12 goals in 22 appearances.

== Ulinzi Stars Fc ==
Enosh joined Ulinzi in 2015 and hit the ground running scoring 5 goals in 8 matches in his first year at the club. In 2016, he played 13 matches scoring 8 goals. in 2017, he scored 8 goals in 10 matches, and in 2018 he scored 17 goals in 33 matches, this feat made him win the Kenya Premier League Golden Boot

== International career ==
Enosh made his international debut in July 2019 at Dar es Salaam Stadium against Tanzania.

== Personal life ==
He is a graduate of the Kenya Defense Forces Recruits’ Training School.

== Honours ==
Kenyan Premier League (KPL) top scorer with 17 goals
