= Collins Shivachi =

Kenyan footballer

Personal information
- Date of birth: 12 April 1994 (age 32)
- Place of birth: Kakamega, Kenya
- Height: 1.71 m (5 ft 7 in)
- Position: Defender

Team information
- Current team: Leopards

Senior career*
Years	Team	Apps	(Gls)
2011	Western Stima		
2012–2015	Sofapaka		
2016–2020	Tusker		
2019–	Leopards		

International career^{‡}
2015–	Kenya	1	(1)
- * Club domestic league appearances and goals as of 17:27, 30 April 2017 (UTC) ‡ National team caps and goals as of 17:27, 30 April 2017 (UTC)

Collins Shivachi (born 12 April 1994) is a Kenyan international footballer who plays for A.F.C. Leopards, as a defender.

== Career ==
Born in Kakamega, Shivachi has played club football for Western Stima, Sofapaka and Tusker.

He made his international debut for Kenya in 2015.
