= Stephen Waruru =

Kenyan professional footballer

Stephen Waruru (Born 28 Aug 1982) is a retired Kenyan footballer who turned out for Kenyan Premier League sides Thika United, Ulinzi Stars, Sofapaka F.C. KCB FC and Bidco United.

While at Ulinzi, he was named the 2011 Kenyan premier league top scorer after scoring 12 goals.

He turned out for Kenya junior sides U17 and U20, and Kenya senior team between 2011 and 2017.

Upon retirement as a player in June 2023 he went on to acquire his coaching badges and also trained as a Safety and security officer (SSO) and now serves his former club Bidco United in that capacity after temporarily holding forte as a team manager.
