= Chemelil Sports Complex =

Stadium in Chemelil, Kenya

- Interactive map of Chemelil Sports Complex
- Full name: Chemelil Sports Complex
- Location: Chemelil, Kenya
- Coordinates: 0°04′39″S 35°07′50″E
- Capacity: 5,000

Tenant
- Chemelil Sugar F.C.

The Chemelil Sports Complex is a multi-use stadium in Chemelil, Kenya. It is used mostly for football matches, and is the home stadium of Chemelil Sugar F.C. The stadium holds 5,000 people.
