= KPL Top 8 Cup =

Kenyan football competition

- Founded: 2011
- Region: Kenya
- Teams: 8
- Current champions: Muhoroni Youth (1st title)
- Most championships: Gor Mahia; Tusker (2 titles each)

The KPL Top 8 Cup (also known as KPL Top 8 Knockout, KPL Top 8 Knockout Cup, Top 8 Knockout, Top 8 Cup or Kenyan Top 8 Cup) is a Kenyan football championship contested by the top eight teams of the Kenyan Premier League (KPL) season. The inaugural edition took place in 2011, with Ulinzi Stars as the winners.

== Format ==
The tournament is played in both a single-elimination and double-elimination format. It begins with the quarter-finals, where teams play against each other once. In the semi-finals, teams play each other in two matches and the team with more goals on aggregate advances to the final, which is played once. No third place playoff is played.

The winners of the tournament receive a total sum of KSh.1,000,000/= as prize money, although appeals to the Football Kenya Federation have been made to increase the sum as gate collections in the tournament surpass the prize money amount.

== Finals by year ==
Year	Team 1	Pos.	Score	Team 2	Pos.	Ref
2011	Ulinzi Stars	1st	2−1	Western Stima	8th	
2012	Ulinzi Stars	2nd	0−2	Gor Mahia	4th	
2013	Thika United	5th	2−2 (3–5 p)	Tusker	1st	
2014	Tusker	5th	2−1	A.F.C. Leopards	2nd	
2015	Sony Sugar	6th	1–2 (a.e.t.)	Gor Mahia	1st	
2016	Muhoroni Youth	6th	1–0	Gor Mahia	1st	
