= Simon Mbugua =

Kenyan footballer (born 1991)

Personal information
- Date of birth: 8 June 1991 (age 35)
- Position: Right back

Team information
- Current team: Posta Rangers

Senior career*
Years	Team	Apps	(Gls)
2010–2015	Thika United		
2016–	Posta Rangers		

International career^{‡}
2016–	Kenya	2	(0)
- * Club domestic league appearances and goals as of 19:10, 25 April 2017 (UTC) ‡ National team caps and goals as of 19:10, 25 April 2017 (UTC)

Simon Mbugua (born 8 June 1991) is a Kenyan international footballer who plays for Posta Rangers, as a right back.

== Career ==
Mbugua has played club football for Thika United and Posta Rangers.

He made his international debut for Kenya in 2016.
