= Dennis Odhiambo =

Kenyan footballer (born 1985)

Personal information
- Full name: Dennis Omino Odhiambo
- Date of birth: 18 March 1985 (age 41)
- Place of birth: Siaya, Kenya
- Height: 1.78 m (5 ft 10 in)
- Positions: Left-back; defensive midfielder

Team information
- Current team: Muranga Seal

Senior career*
Years	Team	Apps	(Gls)
2006–2009	Thika United		
2009–2012	University of Pretoria		
2012–2018	Thika United	144	(22)
2018–2019	Sofapaka	27	(2)
2019–2022	Kenya Commercial Bank		
2024–	Muranga Seal		

International career^{‡}
2011–2019	Kenya	33	(1)
- * Club domestic league appearances and goals as of 14:53, 28 June 2026 (UTC) ‡ National team caps and goals as of 12:47, 26 January 2023 (UTC)

Dennis Odhiambo (born 18 March 1985) is a Kenyan professional footballer who plays for Muranga Seal, as a left-back and defensive midfielder.

== Club career ==
Born in Siaya, Odhiambo has played club football for Thika United, University of Pretoria, Sofapaka and Kenya Commercial Bank. He retired from KCB in 2022, before returning to play with Muranga Seal in January 2024.

== International career ==
He made his international debut for Kenya in 2011, representing them at the 2019 Africa Cup of Nations.

=== International goals ===
Scores and results list Kenya's goal tally first.

No.	Date	Venue	Opponent	Score	Result	Competition
1.	8 June 2018	Mumbai Football Arena, Mumbai, India	Chinese Taipei	1–0	4–0	2018 Intercontinental Cup

== Playing style ==
He plays as a left-back and defensive midfielder.
