= Francis Ochieng =

Kenyan footballer (born 1982)

Personal information
- Date of birth: 9 December 1982 (age 43)
- Position: Goalkeeper

Senior career*
Years	Team	Apps	(Gls)
2001–2003	Mumias Sugar		
2003–2004	Tusker		
2004–2005	Ulinzi Stars		
2005–2006	Kangemi United		
2006–2015	Ulinzi Stars		

International career
2008–2009	Kenya	4	(0)
- * Club domestic league appearances and goals

Francis Ochieng (born 9 December 1982) is a Kenyan former footballer who played as a goalkeeper.

== Career ==
Ochieng played club football for Mumias Sugar, Tusker, Ulinzi Stars and Kangemi United.

He earned four caps for the Kenyan national team.
