= Collins Okoth =

Kenyan professional footballer

Collins Okoth Ougo alias Gattuso (Born 21 Jul 1989) is a retired Kenyan footballer who turned out for Kenyan Premier League sides Gor Mahia, Tusker, Sofapaka and AFC Leopards between the years 2010 and 2018. He turned out for Kenya between 2010 and 2015 earning over 20 caps.

In 2024 Okoth faced trial over alleged murder and rape that occurred in Lucky Summer estate in Ruaraka, Nairobi that occurred in April the same year.

== Career statistics ==
=== International ===
Appearances and goals by national team and year
| National team | Year | Apps | Goals |
|---|---|---|---|
| Kenya | 2011 | 13 | 1 |
| Kenya | 2012 | 3 | 0 |
| Kenya | 2013 | – | |
| Kenya | 2014 | – | |
| Kenya | 2015 | 9 | 0 |
| Total | | 25 | 1 |

Scores and results list Kenya's goal tally first, score column indicates score after each Okoth goal.

List of international goals scored by Collins Okoth
| No. | Date | Venue | Opponent | Score | Result | Competition |
|---|---|---|---|---|---|---|
| 1 | 5 January 2011 | Osman Ahmed Osman Stadium, Cairo, Egypt | Sudan | 1–0 | 1–0 | 2011 Nile Basin Tournament |
