= Humphrey Mieno =

Kenyan footballer (born 1989)

Personal information
- Full name: Humphrey Mieno Ochieng
- Date of birth: 25 September 1989 (age 37)
- Place of birth: Nairobi, Kenya
- Height: 1.81 m (5 ft 11 in)
- Position: Midfielder

Team information
- Current team: Tusker

Youth career
- 2004: Ligi Ndogo

Senior career*
Years	Team	Apps	(Gls)
2008	Mahakama	25	(5)
2009–2010	KCB	28	(8)
2011	Sofapaka	26	(1)
2011–2012	Club Africain	0	(0)
2012–2014	Sofapaka	24	(15)
2013	→ Azam (loan)		
2014–2015	A.F.C. Leopards	16	(3)
2015–2017	Tusker	85	(9)
2017–2019	Gor Mahia	48	(9)
2019	Saint George		
2019–	Tusker		

International career^{‡}
2010–	Kenya	16	(0)
- * Club domestic league appearances and goals as of 27 January 2015 ‡ National team caps and goals as of 4 July 2015

Humphrey Mieno Ochieng (born 25 December 1989 in Nairobi) is a Kenyan professional footballer who plays for Kenya Premier League side Tusker F.C. and the Kenya national team as a midfielder. He previously played for A.F.C. Leopards, Sofapaka and Kenya Commercial Bank in the Kenyan Premier League, as well as Tunisian side Club Africain and Tanzanian club Azam.

== Club career ==
=== A.F.C. Leopards ===
On 13 June 2014, Mieno joined A.F.C. Leopards from Sofapaka for a reported KSh.1.2 million (approx. US$13,690 or £8,100 sterling).

=== Tusker ===
After only almost seven months with Ingwe, Mieno's transfer to Tusker was announced on 27 January 2015. Criticised on social media for allegedly being lured away from A.F.C. Leopards purely for money and never being guided by his ambitions and contractual obligations, Mieno defended his move to his new club, saying that A.F.C. Leopards failed to pay him his wages for more than three months. He added that it was the same reason he left Sofapaka as well.

Mieno made his debut for Tusker in a 1–1 draw against Thika United at the Thika Municipal Stadium in their first league game of the season on 21 February 2015.
