= Eugene Asike =

Kenyan footballer (born 1993)

Personal information
- Full name: Eugene Ambuchi Asike
- Date of birth: 30 November 1993 (age 32)
- Height: 1.83 m (6 ft 0 in)
- Position: Centre back

Team information
- Current team: Hastings United

Senior career*
Years	Team	Apps	(Gls)
2011	Kenya Commercial Bank		
2012–2015	Sofapaka		
2015–2022	Tusker		
2022–2023	Karlstad	18	(0)
2023	Tusker		
2024–2025	Whitehawk	8	(0)
2025	Lancing	9	(0)
2025–	Hastings United	1	(0)

International career^{‡}
2012–	Kenya	3	(0)
- * Club domestic league appearances and goals as of 15:27, 29 October 2025 (UTC) ‡ National team caps and goals as of 10:53, 29 April 2017 (UTC)

Eugene Ambuchi Asike (born 30 November 1993) is a Kenyan international footballer who last played as a centre back for Isthmian League South East Division club Hastings United.

== Career ==
Asike has played club football for Kenya Commercial Bank, Sofapaka and Tusker. In April 2022 he signed for Swedish club Karlstad.

He returned to Tusker on a short-term deal in September 2023 after contractual problems at Karlstad, before moving to England to study at Brighton University, joining Whitehawk in November 2024. After 8 league and 1 cup appearance, he left for Lancing in March 2025.

In October 2025, Asike joined Isthmian League South East Division club Hastings United.

== International career ==
He made his international debut for Kenya in 2012.

== Personal life ==
In May 2025, Asike graduated from Brighton University with a qualification in Strength and Conditioning.
