= Martin Imbalambala =

Kenyan professional footballer

Personal information
- Date of birth: 4 July 1988 (age 38)
- Place of birth: Kakamega, Kenya
- Position: Defender

Senior career*
Years	Team	Apps	(Gls)
2010–2015	Leopards		
2016	Kakamega Homeboyz		
2017–2018	Vihiga United		

International career
2012	Kenya	3	(0)
- * Club domestic league appearances and goals

Martin Imbalambala (born 4 July 1988) is a retired Kenyan footballer who played for Kenyan Premier League sides A.F.C. Leopards, Vihiga United and Kakamega Homeboyz. Internationally he represented Kenya, playing three matches for his nation in 2012.

After retirement from active football he suffered a rare occurrence by going blind in the year 2022.
