= Madaraka Estate =

Coordinates: 1°18′26″S 36°48′55″E

Madaraka Estate is a middle class residential neighbourhood in Nairobi located approximately 5 km (3.1 mi) from the city center. The word madaraka is Swahili for self governance while "estate" refers to a housing development. Popularly known as Madaa, the neighbourhood is one of Nairobi City Council’s oldest housing developments besides Jamhuri, Huruma Mariakani and Kariakor estates. It is located approximately 200 meters from Nyayo National Stadium on Lang’ata Road which branches off A104 the intercity highway that links Nairobi to Mombasa. Madaraka is bordered by other popular residential areas such as Nairobi West, Upper Hill, Kenyatta Estate, Mawenzi, Mbagathi, Nyayo Highrise, AP (Administration Police) Camp, and Siwaka. It sits on 45 acres of land in a location highly coveted for its close proximity and accessibility to the city. Kibera, Nairobi's largest slum is three miles from Madaraka.

== Geography ==
Madaraka, nestled between the larger and more affluent suburbs of Karen and Westlands, is located at 1°18'26"S 36°48'55"E. It is within walking distance to the city center and its location makes it popular with property developers, private businesses and people attracted to the quite and low crime atmosphere of residential neighborhoods on west side of the city. The place is easily accessible to and from the airports, recreational spots, major educational institutions, hospitals, wildlife parks, museums, commercial and industrial areas. From Lang'ata road, the Ole Sangale road runs midway through the estate to intersect with Karuri Gakure Road.

== History ==
Madaraka estate was constructed in the early 1970s for middle income city residents. The City Council of Nairobi obtained a loan from the National Housing Corporation (NHC) and constructed 2 and 3 bed-roomed rentals in 46 blocks of flats each with at least 12 units. The 46 blocks of residences comprising 192 two bed roomed flats and 408 three bedroom flats, were opened for occupancy on 1 June 1973 and 600 families moved in.

From the early 1990s it was reported that the City Council of Nairobi had defaulted on a Loan from NHC and the latter obtained a court ruling barring the City Council from collecting rent from Madaraka estate tenants. The tenants were instructed to pay their rents to NHC until the day the City Council would pay off its debt to the Corporation.

Immediately after NHC took over rent collection from the units, there were reports that the corporation was looking to sell the units to private real estate companies, individuals or politicians. The reports infuriated tenants some of whom had lived there for over twenty years as the move was seen as leading to their eviction from the units. Because of Madaraka’s prime location, the sale of the units was an attractive opportunity to both seller and interested buyers as they would renovate the units and sell them or rent them out at higher rents as much as 30,000 per month compared to the very low rents of 3,000 per month paid by the tenants. In 2009, NHC was reported to have put Madaraka estate up for sale. The two bed roomed flats were marketed for KSh1.6 million each and the three bedroom flats for KSh2 million.

In February 2009, police shot dead five suspected gangsters in Madaraka.

== Places of interest ==
- Strathmore University
- Nyayo National Stadium
