= Chemelil Sugar F.C. =

Kenyan football club

Chemelil Sugar
- Full name: Chemelil Sugar Football Club
- Nickname: Chemelil Sugar F.C
- Founded: 1968; 58 years ago
- Ground: Chemelil Sports Complex; Chemelil, Kenya
- Capacity: 5,000
Home colours

Chemelil Sugar Football Club, or simply Chemelil Sugar FC, was a Kenyan football club based in Chemelil. They were playing in the top division in Kenyan football from 1997 to 2020 when the team got disbanded. Their home stadium was Chemelil Sports Complex. The club won Kenyan Cup in 2003, but most top clubs pulled out of the competition due to a feud between them and Kenya Football Federation. The club was owned by the Chemelil Sugar Company.

The club was founded in 1968 and joined the district league. It won the Provincial league in 1995 and was promoted to the Super League (the 2nd tier league in Kenya). The team needed only one season to be promoted to the Premier League.

== Management ==
- Team Manager: Hillary Ouma
- Head Coach: Charles Odero
- Media and Communications Officer: Alvin Wesonga

== Achievements ==
- Kenyan President's Cup: 1

2003

== Performance in CAF competitions ==
- CAF Confederation Cup: 2 appearances

2004 – Preliminary Round
2005 – withdrew in Preliminary Round
