= Western Stima F.C. =

Kenyan football club

Western Stima
- Full name: Western Stima Football Club
- Nicknames: KPLC; Kenya Power
- Founded: 1997; 29 years ago
- Ground: Bukhungu Stadium
- Capacity: 25,000
- Owner: Kenya Power and Lighting Company
- Chairman: (Kenya) Hassan Shibwabo
- Head coach: (Kenya) Salim Babu
- League: Kenyan Premier League
- 2015: 11th
Home colours

Western Stima Football Club is a Kenyan football club based in Kakamega. The team play their home games primarily at the Bukhungu Stadium, but also at the Moi Stadium. Western Stima currently compete in the Kenyan Premier League.

The team joined the Kenya Premier League in 2008 and was relegated in 2017, but were promoted back in the 2018 season.

== Achievements ==
- KPL Top 8 Cup
  - Runners-up (1): 2011
