= Nyayo National Stadium =

Multi-purpose stadium in Nairobi, Kenya

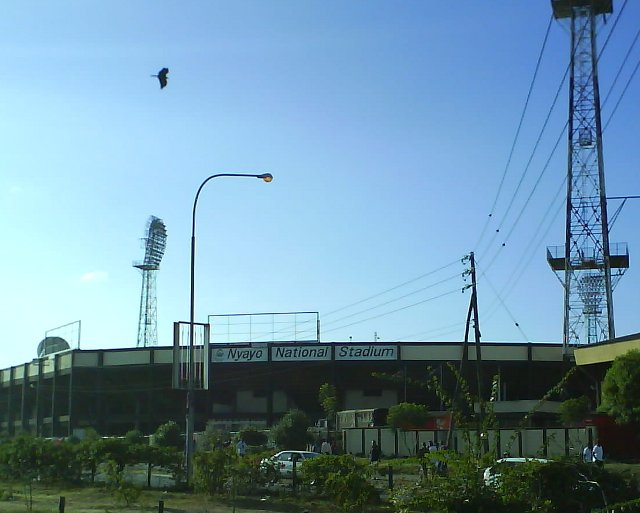
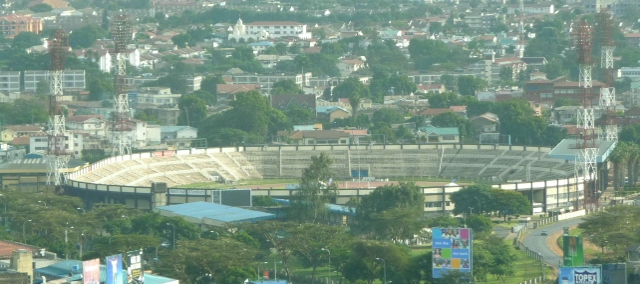
- Aerial view:
- Interactive map of Nyayo National Stadium
- Full name: Nyayo National Stadium
- Location: Nairobi, Kenya
- Coordinates: 1°18′13″S 36°49′27″E
- Owner: Government of Kenya
- Operator: Sports Kenya
- Capacity: 18,000 (2024–present)
- Surface: Grass

Construction
- Groundbreaking: 1982
- Opened: 1983
- Renovated: 2024
- Expanded: 2024
- Architects: Nyanja Architects and Associates

Tenants
- A.F.C. Leopards; Athletics Kenya; Kenya national football team Tusker F.C. (selected atches); Kenya Police F.C. (selected matches); Nairobi United FC (selected matches); Gor Mahia F.C. (selected matches)

Nyayo National Stadium is a 18,000-seater multipurpose stadium in Nairobi, Kenya. It is located at the square of Mombasa Road, Langata Road, and the Aerodrome Road. It is approximately two kilometers from the city center, directly opposite the Nairobi Mega Mall, formerly known as Nakumatt Mega. It is currently mostly used for football matches hosting, AFC Leopards. Rugby union club Mwamba RFC used to use the stadium for home games. The stadium has also hosted other sports events such as athletics, swimming, and also a popular venue for various national ceremonies, most common of which are National Holiday celebrations. Other facilities at the stadium include a gymnasium and a 50-metre swimming pool. The stadium houses the headquarters for the Football Kenya Federation and Athletics Kenya.

== History ==
The stadium was built in 1983 with a capacity of 30,000. The completion of the Nyayo Stadium gave Kenya the opportunity to be placed in the category of nations that were invited to bid for the 4th All-Africa Games in 1987, a bid that was awarded to Kenya, giving it international status and paving the way for the to Moi International Sports Centre.

The Nyayo Stadium was the host venue for the 2010 African Championships in Athletics. The stadium was renamed to the Coca-Cola National Stadium, after the multi-national company won the naming rights in February 2009. The deal was worth $1.5 million USD and would have seen the beverage company do branding, marketing, and naming for the whole stadium for three years. Three months later, however, Coca-Cola withdrew from the contract, and the stadium was renamed again to the Nyayo National Stadium, as the Government of Kenya wanted.

== Components ==
=== Main stadium ===
The main stadium contains floodlights, 2 VIP lounges, a boardroom, and an internet-enabled media centre. The stadium has hosted concerts, public holiday celebrations, public rallies, meetings, and crusades. The stadium also houses the headquarters for the Football Kenya Federation and Athletics Kenya.

=== Aquatic Centre ===
The aquatic centre holds 2,000 people, contains a filtration plant, and a public 50 × 25 m swimming pool.

=== Indoor Gymnasium ===
The indoor gymnasium holds 2,500 people and is home to the Kenyan National Basketball League and the Kenya national basketball team. It also features floodlights, electronic scoreboards, snack bars, a boxing ring, an indoor badminton court, a martial arts gym, and other social facilities.

=== Handball and volleyball training courts ===
The handball and volleyball courts can accommodate up to 1,500 spectators and feature outdoor training courts.

=== Recent renovations ===
Nyayo National Stadium has undergone extensive renovations in preparation for hosting the 2024 African Nations Championship (CHAN) and the 2027 Africa Cup of Nations (AFCON). Key upgrades include an enhanced playing surface with improved drainage, installation of a media tribune accommodating approximately 150 journalists, and air-conditioned changing rooms, and doping control area. Additionally, new floodlighting units have been installed, and the number of CCTV cameras has been increased.

== Hosting of WC Qualifiers ==
These improvements paved the way for the stadium to host its first international match in nearly three years. On 23 March 2025, Kenya's Harambee Stars faced Gabon in a 2026 FIFA World Cup qualifier at Nyayo Stadium. The match attracted a capacity crowd, with all 30,000 tickets sold out, marking a significant milestone in the stadium's history and demonstrating Kenya's readiness to host top-tier football events.

== See also ==
- Football in Kenya
- Lists of stadiums
