= Muhoroni Youth F.C. =

Kenyan football club

Muhoroni Youth FC
- Full name: Muhoroni Youth Football Club
- Founded: 2003
- Ground: Nyayo National Stadium
- Capacity: 30,000
- Head coach: Bangkai Kerala
- League: Kenyan Premier League
- 2015: 6th

Muhoroni Youth Football Club is a football club from Muhoroni, Kenya, but plays its home matches at the Nyayo National Stadium in Nairobi. They currently compete in the Kenyan Premier League, where they were promoted after winning the 2011 season of the defunct KFF Nationwide League.

Muhoroni youth won the top 8 cup in 2016.
