= Ulinzi Stars F.C. =

Kenyan football club

Ulinzi Stars
- Full name: Ulinzi Stars Football Club
- Nicknames: KDF; Ulinzi
- Founded: 1995; 31 years ago
- Ground: Afraha Stadium; Nakuru, Kenya
- Capacity: 8,200
- Owner: Kenya Defence Forces
- Head coach: Stephen Ocholla
- League: Kenyan Premier League
- 2025–26: KPL, 13th

Ulinzi Stars Football Club is a professional association football club based in Nakuru, Kenya. They compete in the Kenyan Premier League, where they won three consecutive titles from 2003 to 2005. They are the only team to have done so, along with AFC Leopards and Gor Mahia, and won their most recent league title in 2010.

== History ==
Ulinzi Stars represent Kenya's Defence forces (the Kenya Army, the Air Force and the Kenya Navy). It was formed in 1995 when several military sides were combined. These teams were:

- Waterworks
- Scarlet (Third Battalion of the Kenya Rifles, based in Lanet, Nakuru),
- Kahawa United (Kahawa Barracks, Kahawa, Nairobi)
- Silver Strikers (12th Engineers, Thika),
- Kenya Navy (Mombasa)
- Spitfire (Kenya Air Force, Moi Air Base, Nairobi).

Ulinzi have played in the Afraha Stadium since 2004, after moving from Thika. They won the Kenyan Sports Team of the Year award in 2010.

The team doubles as the Kenya national military football team, which qualified for the 2011 Military World Games.

=== Other clubs ===
Ulinzi used to have a successful basketball team, Ulinzi Warriors, until 2007 when it was disbanded, despite being the reigning national champion, having won five consecutive league titles. They also had a rugby team, Ulinzi RFC, but was disbanded. They also had volleyball and handball teams.

== Achievements ==
- Kenyan Premier League: 4

2003, 2004, 2005, 2010

- KPL Top 8 Cup: 1

2011

== Performance in CAF competitions ==
- CAF Champions League: 2 appearances

2004 – First Round
2011 – Preliminary Round
