= Thika United F.C. =

Association football club in Kenya

- Full name: Thika United Football Club
- Founded: 2000
- Ground: Thika Sub-County Stadium; Thika, Kenya
- Capacity: 5,000
- Chairman: Elio Lolli
- Head coach: Nicholas Muyoti
- League: Kenyan Premier League
- 2018: 18th
- Website: http://www.thikaunitedfc.com
Home colours	Away colours

Thika United Football Club is an association football club based in Thika, Kenya, which currently competes in the Kenyan Super League, the second tier of the Kenyan football league system. They play their home games at the Sea Joy Arena.

The club was formed in 2000 as Beirut FC. The following year, after being promoted to the Nationwide League (second level), it adopted a new name, Medisca Thika, after its then sponsors. The current name (Thika United FC) has been in use since 2003, which was also its first year in the top flight under the sponsorship of Brookside Dairies. Midfielder Matthew Dickinson hit the headlines of local and some national newspapers when he left local team Brislington Badgers in Bristol, England, to travel to Kenya to gain nationality and happened to earn himself a lengthy contract with Thika United.

== History ==
Thika United made their top flight debut in 2002 and finished third in 2006 and 2009.

Thika United regained promotion to the Kenya Premier League after beating Ushuru F.C. 2–1 on aggregate in the 2017 Kenya Super League promotion playoffs.

They were relegated back to the Kenya Nationwide League after one season, finishing bottom of the Kenyan Premier League in 2018.

== See also ==
- Thika Queens F.C.
