= Football hooliganism =

Violent behaviour by football spectators

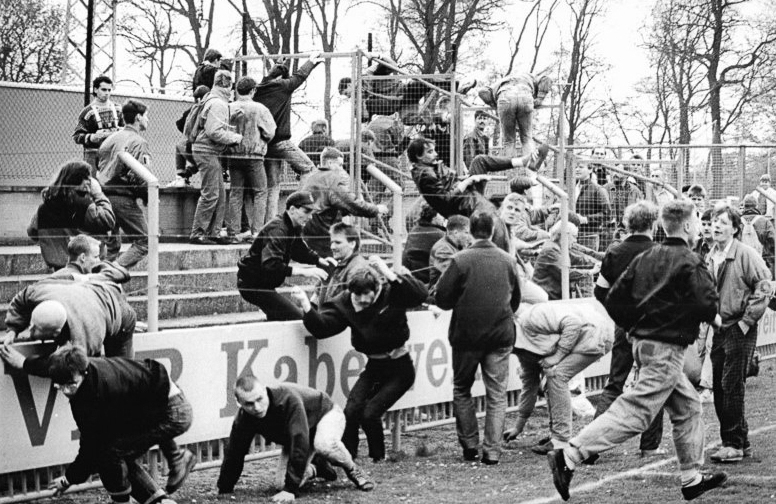
1. FC Lokomotive Leipzig fans before their team's encounter with SG Dynamo Schwerin in the East German FDGB-Pokal in 1990.

Football hooliganism, also known as football rioting, constitutes violence and other destructive behaviors perpetrated by spectators at association football events. Football hooliganism typically involves conflict between pseudo-tribes, formed to intimidate and attack supporters of other teams. The word hooligan first came into prominent usage in the 1890s in the United Kingdom.

Certain clubs have long-standing rivalries with other clubs and hooliganism associated with matches between them (sometimes called local derbies) can be more severe. Conflict may arise at any point, before, during or after matches and occasionally outside of game situations. Participants often select locations away from stadiums to avoid arrest by the police, but conflict can also erupt spontaneously inside the stadium or in the surrounding streets. In extreme cases, hooligans, police and bystanders have been killed, and riot police have intervened. Hooligan-led violence has been called "aggro" (short for "aggression" or "aggravation") and "bovver" (the Cockney pronunciation of "bother", i.e. trouble).

Hooligans who have the time and money may follow national teams to away matches and engage in hooligan behaviour against the hooligans of the home team. They may also become involved in disorder involving the general public. While national-level firms do not exist in the form of club-level firms, hooligans supporting the national team may use a collective name indicating their allegiance.

== Behavior ==
Examples of football hooliganism

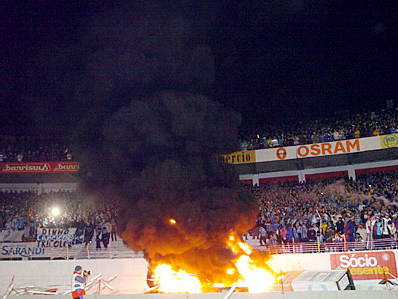
Grêmio hooligans set Internacional's Estádio Beira-Rio on fire during a Grenal derby in 2006.

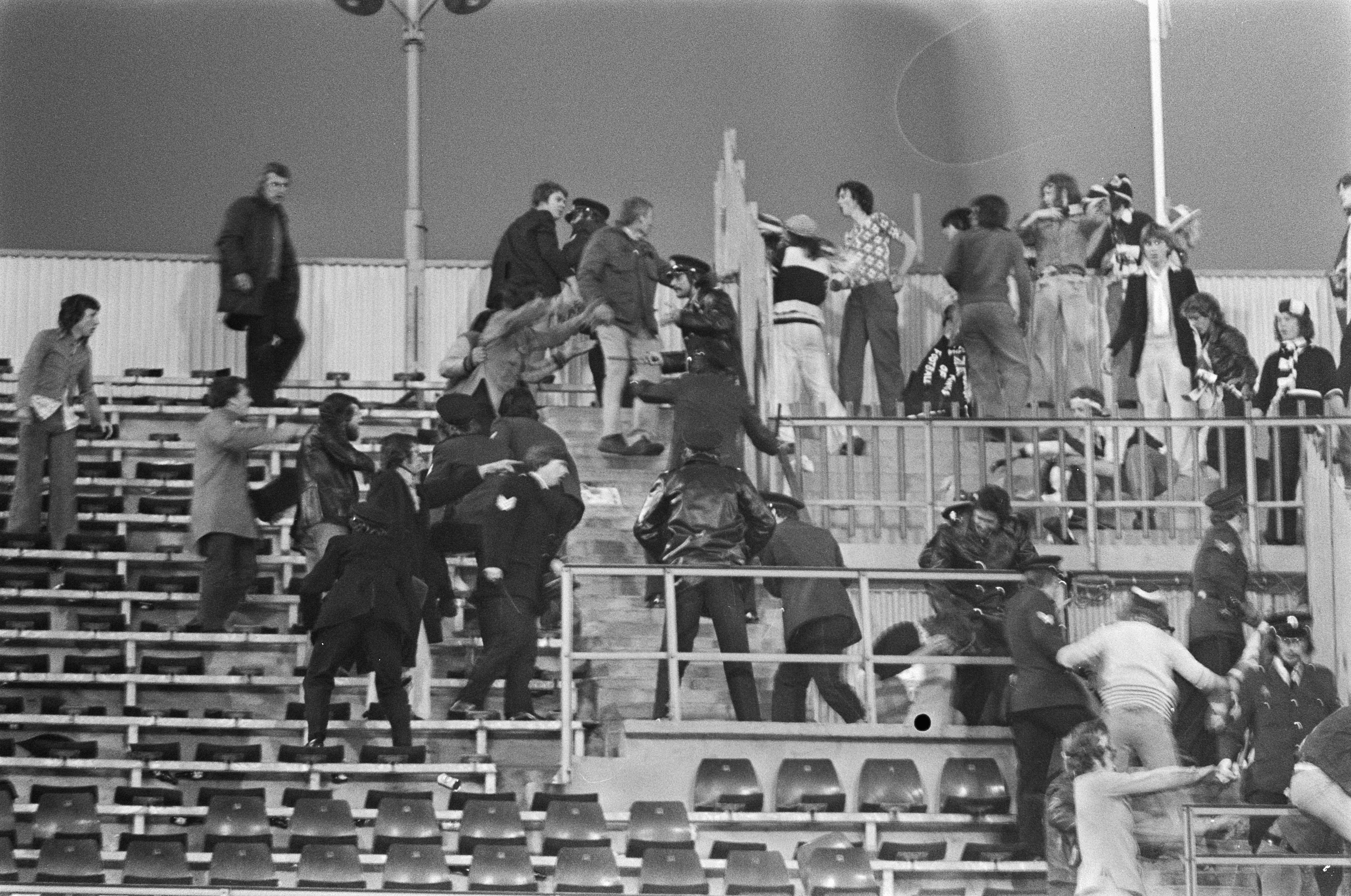
Tottenham Hotspur fans rioting following their defeat in a match against Feyenoord in 1974.

Hooliganism can create a high level of violence at football matches. Outside of the physical violence, the behavior of these fans is extremely disorderly and leads to conflict breaking out. In some cases, hooliganism involves extreme ideological pathways such as Neo-Nazism or white supremacism. These extreme beliefs which they take on can further invigorate the violence. Hooligans' intentions are usually not focused on the match itself, despite club rivalries or pride often justifying the violence. They engage in behavior that risks them being arrested before the match, denied admittance to the stadium, ejected from the stadium during the match or banned from attending future matches. Hooligan groups often associate themselves with, and congregate in, a specific section (called an end in England) of their team's stadium, and sometimes they include the section's name in the name of their group.

=== Differences from ultras and alcohol-driven conflicts ===
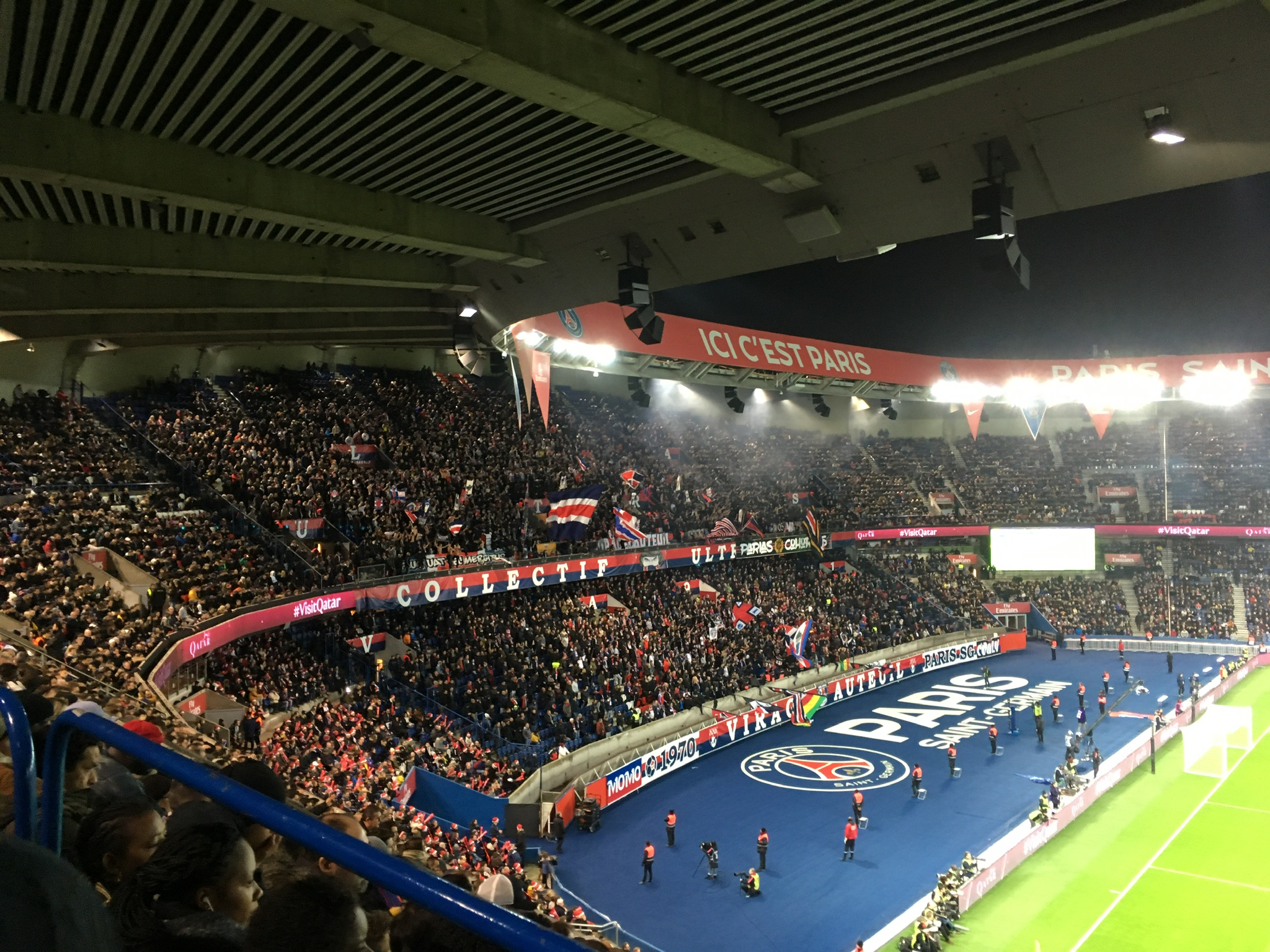
PSG Ultras before a game, using flares and tifos to generate the intended atmosphere.

In other parts of Europe and the world, these groups are known as ultras, in Hispanic America as Barra Bravas, and in Brazil as Torcidas Organizadas. However, these groups do not necessarily engage in violence in the same manner as hooliganism. These are supporters' groups with the primary objective of fanatically supporting the club through chants, flags, displays and organizing trips to away games. Due to their fanaticism, many of those groups frequently become embroiled with hooliganism, but do not have the explicit objective of causing violence.

=== Violence ===
The type of violence committed by hooligans can come in a number of forms: starting fires, unarmed and armed fighting, hateful speech, and occasionally even acts committed against the players, such as throwing bottles to physically harm them or bananas to racially attack them.

In 2014 in a match between Barcelona and Villarreal, a fan racially abused Dani Alves, the Barcelona right back, by throwing a banana at him, insinuating that he was a monkey, a known racial stereotype against black people. The fan was banned for life.

Violence can also come as a result of a player's poor performance. Fans and in particular hooligans hold their mistakes to them, ridiculing them in any way possible. Andres Escobar was a Colombian defender whose own goal error led to the elimination of Colombia in the 1994 World Cup, resulting in him being subsequently murdered.

==== Match-day ====
A study from LMU Munich analyzed violent crime in Germany from 2011 to 2015 and how much of that can be attributed to football. It found that on the day of the game, violent crime increased by 17% and during major rivalry games, violent crimes increased by 63%.

== History ==
The first recorded instances of football hooliganism in the modern game allegedly occurred during the 1880s in England, a period when gangs of supporters would intimidate neighbourhoods, in addition to attacking referees, opposing supporters and players. In 1885, after Preston North End beat Aston Villa 5–0 in a friendly match, both teams were pelted with stones, attacked with sticks, punched, kicked and spat at. One Preston player was beaten so severely that he lost consciousness and press reports at the time described the fans as "howling roughs". The following year, Preston fans fought Queen's Park fans in a railway station—the first alleged instance of football hooliganism outside of a match. In 1905, a number of Preston fans were tried for hooliganism, including a "drunk and disorderly" 70-year-old woman, following their match against Blackburn Rovers.

Although instances of football crowd violence and disorder have been a feature of association football throughout its history(e.g. Millwall's ground was reportedly closed in 1920, 1934 and 1950 after crowd disturbances), the phenomenon only started to gain the media's attention in the late 1950s due to the re-emergence of violence in Latin American football. In the 1955–56 English football season, Liverpool and Everton fans were involved in a number of incidents and, by the 1960s, an average of 25 hooligan incidents were being reported each year in England. The label "football hooliganism" first began to appear in the English media in the mid-1960s, leading to increased media interest in, and reporting of, acts of disorder. It has been argued that this, in turn, created a "moral panic" out of proportion with the scale of the actual problem.

== Causes ==
One of the main aspects to examine when trying to understand the root of hooligan violence is about the characteristics of sports teams. Chanting, flags, and ties to the team's area provide a base for "local patriotism", and thus, give way to the unnamed groups and organizations that hooligans identify with. This can expand to a national level, as seen in the case of the UEFA Euro 2016 riots caused by several countries' visiting fans as well as the French host fans. The violence at these tournaments can be amplified due to an increased degree of "patriotism".

Football hooliganism has factors in common with juvenile delinquency and what has been called "ritualized male violence". Sports Studies scholars Paul Gow and Joel Rookwood at Liverpool Hope University found in a 2008 study that "Involvement in football violence can be explained in relation to a number of factors, relating to interaction, identity, legitimacy and power. Football violence is also thought to reflect expressions of strong emotional ties to a football team, which may help to reinforce a supporter's sense of identity." In relation to the Heysel Stadium disaster one study from 1986 claimed that alcohol, irregular tickets sales, the disinterest of the organisers and the "'cowardly ineptitude'" of the police had led to the tragedy. Gow and Rookwood's 2008 study, which used interviews with British football hooligans found that while some identified structural social and physiological causes (e.g. aggression produces violent reactions) most interviewees claimed that media reports (especially in newspapers) and the police's handling of hooligan related events were the main causes of hooliganism.

Political reasons may also play in part in hooliganism, especially if there is a political undertone to such a match (e.g. unfriendly nations facing each other). Other deep division undertones in a match such as religion, ethnic, and class play a part as well in hooliganism.

As an attempt to explain the hooliganism phenomena in Brazil, Nepomuceno and other scholars at Federal University of Pernambuco have assessed 1,363 hooligan incidents before and after an alcohol sanction enforced during 8 years. While alcohol presented low evidence of contribution to the incidents of violence, the knockout phases, finals, competitiveness (derby matches), small score boundaries and the pride levels were some of the potentials for the violence among sports spectators. Months after the work being conducted, the State Legislature of Pernambuco decided to abolish the sanction to allow alcohol intake in stadiums. Writing for the BBC in 2013, David Bond stated that in the UK,

[h]igh-profile outbreaks of violence involving fans are much rarer today than they were 20 or 30 years ago. The scale of trouble now compared to then doesn't bear comparison – either in terms of the number of people involved or the level of organisation. Football has moved on thanks to banning orders and better, more sophisticated policing. And while it is too simplistic to say that the higher cost of watching football has pushed unsavoury elements out, there has been a shift in the way people are expected to behave inside grounds. Offensive chants are still way too commonplace but actual fighting doesn't happen very often.

== Effects ==
=== Anti-hooligan measures ===
The violence perpetrated by hooligans is somewhat of a dying phenomenon although experiencing some surges around 2015. The mid-1990s was when hooliganism was at its highest rate, however, police and clubs themselves have taken strides to prevent the level of hooliganism, and today, violence at games has decreased significantly not only in the amount that's taking place, but in the level of the conflict as well.

One example of anti-hooligan measures are some of the new rules that stadiums have put in place regarding alcohol. Some stadiums do not allow fans to bring their alcoholic drinks up to their seats; they are only permitted to the lower levels near the concessions. In addition, bottles are typically plastic, as to avoid the threat of fans hurling them at other fans or even players. In some cases, specifically in major tournaments, more extreme measures have to be put in place to help reduce the chances of violence. For example, at the 2016 Euros, officials recommended a complete ban on alcohol. In the event that violence results in riots that go out of control, police utilize tools like tear gas and water cannons in an attempt on crowd control. This can sometimes lead to increased violence from the hooligans.

== Europe ==
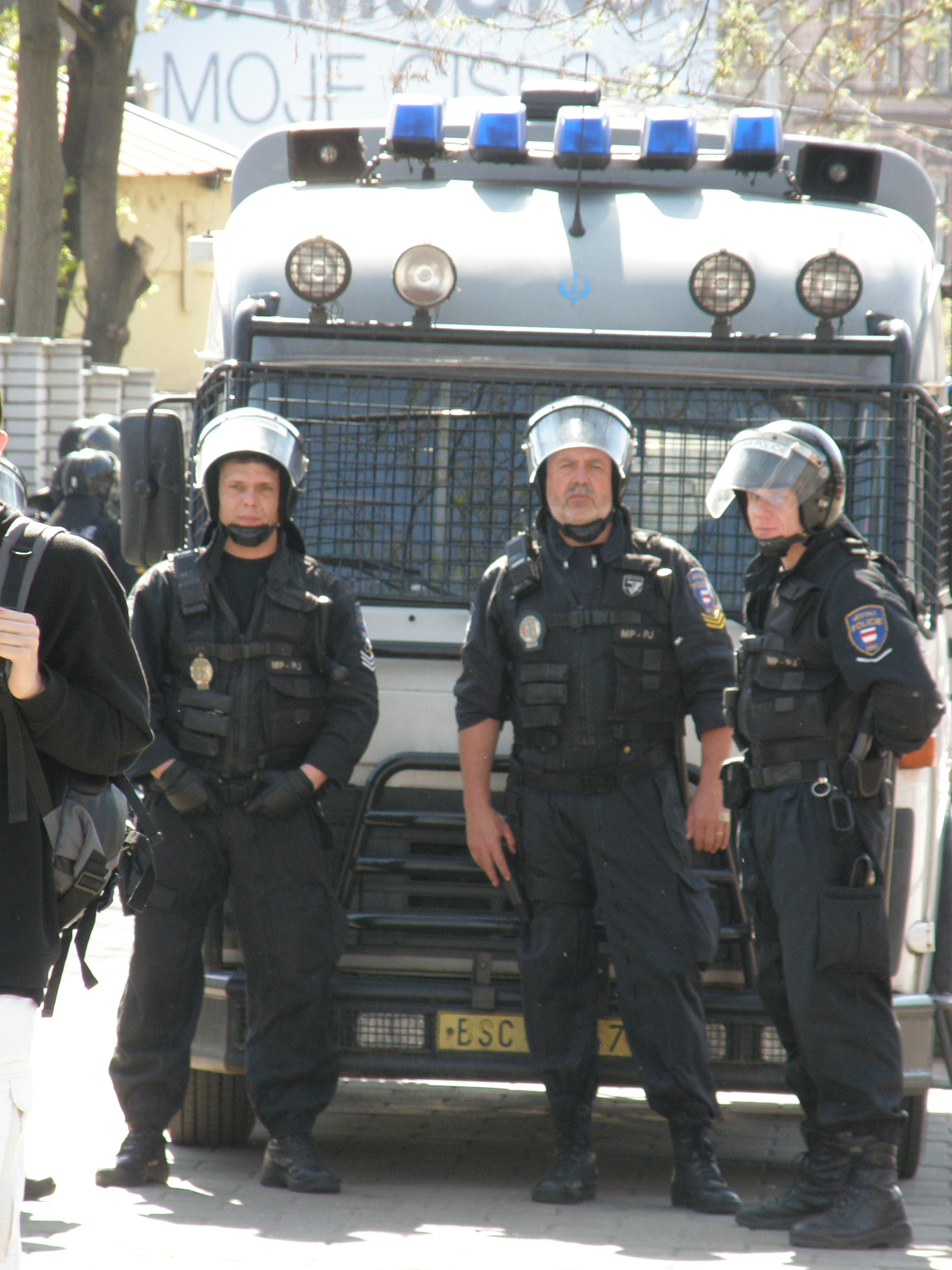
Czech police suited up in riot gear in preparation for post-match disorder in Brno, April 2008

=== Belgium ===
Despite Belgian football hooliganism peaking from the 80s to the 90s, it did not disappear even after the establishment of stringent anti-hooligan measures by police and governments. Fights inside the stadium are growing rare, but have changed slowly and morphed into organized fights in the wilderness and nearby cities. Royal Antwerp, Beerschot, Club Brugge and Anderlecht are notorious for hooligan fanbases.

=== Bosnia and Herzegovina ===
Many fans are associated with fascist ideologies, supporting and glorifying extremist movements such as the Ustaše and the Nazis.

In 2009, riots between supports of Bosnian Premier League club sides NK Široki Brijeg and FK Sarajevo left Horde Zla supporter Vedran Puljić (from Sarajevo) dead from a gunshot wound.

Hooliganism has also been present in lower leagues. Riots have been common in Jablanica because fans of different clubs tend to meet and clash there.

=== Bulgaria ===
A 2019 Euro qualifying match between Bulgaria and England was suspended twice to remove fans that had been taunting black English players. Raheem Sterling said that he had heard masked groups making monkey sounds and performing Nazi salutes and throwing objects onto the pitch. After the match Bulgarian police officers were called in to escort the English fans to the safety of their hotels protecting them from the hooligans that had been removed earlier on during the match.

=== Croatia ===
Football hooliganism in Croatia has seen riots over inter-ethnic resentments and the politics that were reignited by the breakup of the Yugoslav federation in the 1990s. Two of the best known hooligan firms are Torcida (Hajduk Split) and Bad Blue Boys (Dinamo Zagreb).

On 13 May 1990 (before the breakup of Yugoslavia), Serbian club Red Star Belgrade was in Zagreb to play Dinamo Zagreb at the Maksimir Stadium. Red Star was accompanied by 3000 Delije, the organised supporters of the club. Before the match a number of small fights broke out. Police reinforcements soon arrived with armoured vehicles and water cannons, focusing to separate the fans. Dinamo's player Zvonimir Boban kicked one policeman, defending a Dinamo's fan beaten by the police. The fighting lasted for over an hour and hundreds of people were injured.

Ethnic tension between Croats and Serbs has also led to fighting at a football match in Australia. On 13 March 2005, Sydney United (who have a large Croatian following and were established by Croatian immigrants) and Bonnyrigg White Eagles (who have a large Serbian following and were established by Serbian immigrants) met in Sydney in the New South Wales Premier League. About 500 fans clashed, resulting in two police officers getting injured and five fans being arrested. Football NSW held an inquiry into the events. Both clubs denied that the fight was racially motivated or that there was any ethnic rivalry.

Croatian hooligans are also notorious for staging large illegal pyroshows at stadiums, where signal flares and smoke bombs are hurled onto the pitch causing postponement or cancellation of the match. A large incident occurred in 2003 in Rome during the Hajduk-Roma match when 900 Torcida fans threw signal flares at Roma fans resulting in various injuries and clashes with the police.

Another incident occurred in Genoa in 2007 when masked Torcida fans attacked the police with bricks, bottles and stones. Rioting continued in the stadium when Torcida fans threw chairs into the pitch and made Nazi salutes. A riot occurred in 2006 in Osijek during the Osijek-Dinamo match. Several clashes between the Bad Blue Boys and Kohorta occurred before the match in which one Osijek fan received several stab wounds after which Osijek fans attacked the police and Dinamo fans with signal flares and stones.

A large riot occurred in 2008 in Prague prior to the Sparta Prague-Dinamo match. Riots were ignited with the support of Sparta's ultrafans to Radovan Karadžić and Ratko Mladić. Approximately 500 Bad Blue Boys rioted in the city centre, breaking into shops and attacking police with chairs, signal flares and stones. Approximately 300 Bad Blue Boys were detained and eight police officers were injured. Prior to the riots some Bad Blue Boys provoked local Romani people by giving Nazi salutes.

A large riot occurred on 1 May 2010 at the Maksimir stadium when the Bad Blue Boys clashed with the police resulting in many arrests and one critically injured police officer. After the match violent clashes continued in which one Dinamo fan was shot by police officers. A large incident occurred in 2009 prior to the FC Timişoara-Dinamo match. 400 Bad Blue Boys rioted in the city centre and attacked local people. After the incident Romanian police detained a large number of Dinamo fans but the situation escalated again at the FC Timişoara stadium when 200 Bad Blue Boys tore down the pitch fence and attacked the police with chairs and bats resulting in several injured police officers. During the clash, Dinamo fans fired signal missiles at FC Timişoara fans resulting in severe injuries.

In December 2010, 10–15 Tornado (Zadar) hooligans attacked a Partizan traveling coach with stones and bricks resulting in one injured person. In December 2010, 30–40 Bad Blue Boys hooligans attacked a PAOK traveling coach with stones, bricks and flares setting the traveling coach on fire and inflicting injuries on several passengers.

In November 2014, during a Euro 2016 qualifying game in Milan, Italy, hooligans from Croatia threw flares and fireworks onto the field and the game had to be briefly suspended.

In August 2023, an AEK Athens fan was stabbed to death when around 100 Dinamo Zagreb hooligans clashed with local fans in one of the city's suburbs. The two sides of supporters attacked one another near the AEK stadium, throwing stun grenades, stones, incendiary devices and other objects. Police made 96 arrests throughout the night until the early hours of the morning. 102 Croatian fans were charged by the police who suspect links with the "Bad Blue Boys", hard-line supporters of Dinamo Zagreb.

=== Cyprus ===
Football hooliganism in Cyprus has been an issue for the past few decades and incidents are generally associated with the 5 major Cypriot clubs.

Anorthosis Famagusta FC fans have been involved in many incidents on most occasions involving their ultras group "Mahites". The two clubs in Limassol, AEL Limassol and Apollon Limassol have also been involved in numerous incidents, especially in recent years.

Supporters of APOEL FC and AC Omonia Nicosia, the two most successful and most popular clubs in the country are notorious for hooliganism. The most violent cases of hooliganism in Cyprus usually involve the two teams. In May 2009 APOEL fans entered the Omonia stand and engaged in fistfights with Omonia fans eventually throwing one down the stand stairs. 6 months later in November fans of the two teams clashed close to the GSP Stadium when APOEL fans tried to hijack a futsal tournament organized by Omonia. Many were injured including an APOEL fan who was almost beaten to death.

The rivalry between Omonia and APOEL has its roots in politics. APOEL fans are in their majority right wing whereas Omonia fans tend to be left wing. Communist symbols in the Omonia stand and right wing or even fascist symbols in the APOEL stand are not uncommon. The Limassol rivalry between Apollon and AEL Limassol is more a matter of what team dominates over the city. Hooliganism in the case of Anorthosis is also politically linked, especially when the club plays a left wing team such as Omonia. Other incidents between clubs of different cities that are of the same political orientation are associated with intercity rivalries, particularly when a club from Limassol faces a club from Nicosia.

=== France ===
Football hooliganism in France is often rooted in social conflict, including racial tension. In the 1990s, fans of Paris Saint-Germain (PSG) fought with supporters from Belgium, England, Germany, Italy and Scotland. There is a long-standing north–south rivalry between PSG (representing Paris and by extension northern France) and Olympique de Marseille (representing the South of France) which has encouraged authorities to be extremely mobilised during games between the two teams. Violent fights and post-game riots including car burning, and shop windows smashing have been a regular fixture of PSG-OM games. In 2000, the bitter rivalry turned particularly violent when a Marseille fan was seriously injured by a projectile.

On 24 May 2001, fifty people were injured when fighting broke out at a match between PSG and Turkish club Galatasaray at the Parc des Princes stadium. PSG were initially given a record $571,000 fine, but it was reduced on appeal to $114,000. Galatasaray was initially fined $114,000 by UEFA, but it too was eventually reduced to $28,500. In May 2001, six PSG fans from the Supporters Club, were arrested and charged with assault, carrying weapons, throwing items on the pitch and racism. The six were alleged to have deliberately entered a part of the Parc des Princes stadium where French fans of Turkish origin were standing, in order to attack them. The six were banned from all football stadiums for the duration of their trial.

On 24 November 2006 a PSG fan was shot and killed by police and another seriously injured during fighting between PSG fans and the police. The violence occurred after PSG lost 4–2 to Israeli club Hapoel Tel Aviv at the Parc des Prince in a UEFA Cup match. PSG fans chased a fan of Hapoel Tel Aviv, shouting racist and anti-Semitic slogans. A plainclothes police officer who tried to protect the Hapoel fan was attacked, and in the chaos, one fan was shot dead and another seriously injured. In response, the French Interior Minister, Nicolas Sarkozy held a meeting with the president of the French Football League, Frederic Thiriez to discuss racism and violence in football. The director-general of the French police, Michel Gaudin, insisted that measures against football hooliganism had reduced racist incidents to six that season from nineteen in the previous season. Gaudin also stated that 300 known hooligans could be banned from matches. The fan who was shot, was linked with the Boulogne Boys, a group of fans who modelled themselves on British hooligans in the 1980s. The group's name comes from the Kop of Boulogne (KOB), one of the two main home fan stands at the Parc des Princes.

The KOB themselves held a silent memorial march attended by 300 and accused the police office of murdering the fan. They cited bias in the French press who had only given a "one-sided" account of the incident. French President Jacques Chirac condemned violence that led up to the shooting, stating that he was horrified by the reports of racism and anti-Semitism. French Prime Minister, Dominique de Villepin called for new, tougher measures to deal with football hooligans. Prosecutors opened an inquiry into the incident, to determine whether the officer involved should face criminal charges. Before a home match against Sochaux on 4 January 2006, two Arab youths were punched and kicked by white fans outside the entrance to the KOB. During the match racist insults were aimed at black players and a PSG player of Indian origin, Vikash Dhorasoo was told to "go sell peanuts in the metro". In the recent years, following UK's example, France's legislation has changed, including more and more banning of violent fans from stadiums. The threat of dissolution of fan groups has also tempered the outward rivalry and violence of a number of fans. Known violent fans under ban sentences are to report to the nearest police station on nights of game, to prove they are not anywhere in proximity to the stadium.

On 11 June 2016, during a Euro 2016 match in Marseille between Russia and England, violent conflict broke out between the fans and left 35 injured. Both threw numerous items at each other and engaged in physical combat. Even a person who is recording the incident can be seen stomping another person's head. Because of this, both countries were given a disqualification warning soon after. The match ended with 1–1.

On 16 April 2017, during a match between Olympique Lyonnais and SC Bastia, supporters of SC Bastia invaded the pitch in an attempt to fight Lyonnais players. The match was then postponed.

September 2022 saw OGC Nice and 1. FC Köln fans clash outside and inside the Nice stadium, which delayed the start by 55 minutes, 39 were injured with around 50 Cologne fans attacking the home end throwing pyrotechnics.

In 2022 there was chaos at the UEFA Champions League final with dozens of arrests and hundreds of injured, mainly to Liverpool fans who were locked out of the stadium and being attacked by Parisian gangs. French police did not go to their assistance, and instead also attacked the fans and then blamed them for the situation. A UEFA report blamed UEFA for poor security and French police for being heavy handed in attacking, rather than defending, the Liverpool fans.

=== Germany ===
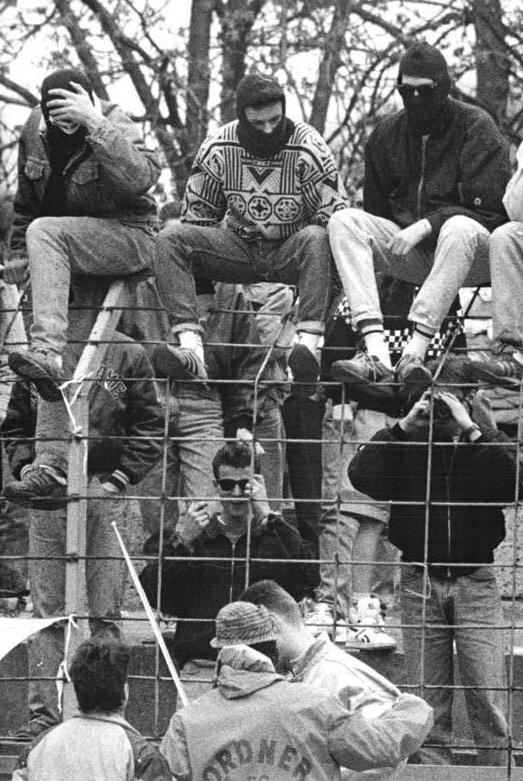
Hooligans of FC Berlin with masked faces in a match between FC Carl Zeiss Jena and FC Berlin on 8 April 1990.

The 18-year old supporter of FC Berlin Mike Polley was killed by several shots fired by police in Leipzig during clashes between supporters of FC Berlin and police before the match between FC Sachsen Leipzig and FC Berlin on 3 November 1990. In June 1998, after a FIFA World Cup match in France between Germany and Yugoslavia a French policeman was beaten to the point of brain damage by German fans. Following the incident, German police contacted many of the known 2,000+ German hooligans to warn them they would be arrested if they traveled to upcoming matches in France. A German fan was arrested in 1998 and charged with attempted murder and in 1999, four more Germans were convicted in the attack. The main defendant, Andre Zawacki, was found guilty of attempted murder and sentenced to ten years in jail. The other three defendants were convicted of grievous bodily harm and given jail sentences of between six months and three-and-a-half years. In 2001, Markus Warnecke, the German fan who was accused of leading the attack, was found guilty and jailed for five years and banned from France for ten years, and from all sports facilities for five years.

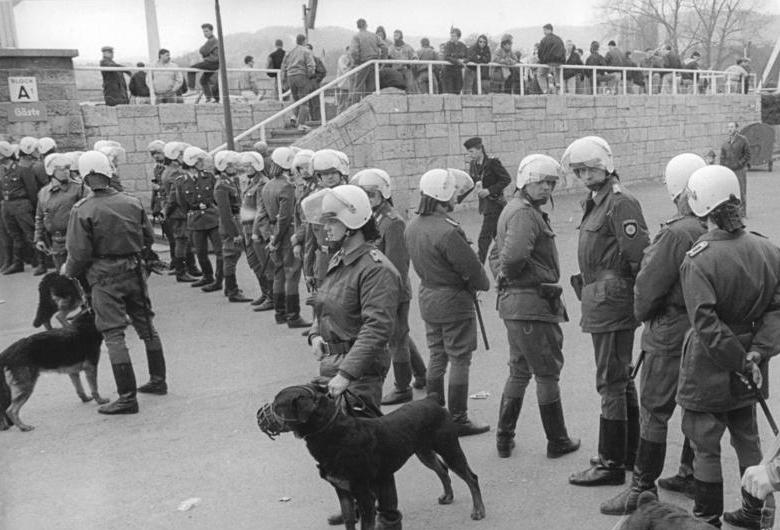
German police prepare for hooliganism by wearing riot gear and using police dogs before a FC Carl Zeiss Jena and FC Berlin match in Berlin in April 1990.

Some football hooliganism in Germany has been linked to neo-Nazism and far right groups. In March 2005, German football fans fought with police and rival fans at a friendly match between Germany and Slovenia in Celje, Slovenia, damaging cars and shops, and shouting racist slogans. The German Football Association (DFB) apologised for the behaviour. As a result, 52 people were arrested; 40 Germans and 12 Slovenians. Following a 2–0 defeat to Slovakia in Bratislava, Slovakia, German hooligans fought with the local police, and six people were injured and two were taken into custody. The DFB again apologised for fans who chanted racist slogans.

In June 2006, Germany beat Poland in a World Cup match in Dortmund, which led to violent clashes. The police detained over 300 people in Dortmund and German fans threw chairs, bottles and fireworks at the police. Of the 300 arrested, 120 were known hooligans. In October 2006, a task force was established to deal with violence and racism in German football stadiums. President of the DFB Theo Zwanziger and president of Bundesliga Werner Hackmann held a crisis meeting following violence at several German lower-division matches. The worst incident took place at a Third division (North) match between the Hertha BSC Berlin B-team and Dynamo Dresden, in which 23 policemen were injured. Dynamo Dresden fans tried to invade the pitch, and threw missiles (including gas cartridges and plastic seats) at police. The police responded with batons and pepper spray. At a Second Division match between FC Augsburg and 1860 Munich, 21 people were arrested and police used pepper spray to disperse fans. In addition, 70 amateur and youth matches in Siegen-Wittgenstein were called off when referees refused to take to the pitch, fearing for their safety. In February 2007 in Saxony, all German lower league matches, from the fifth division downward were cancelled after about 800 fans attacked 300 police officers (injuring 39 of them) after a match between Lokomotive Leipzig and Erzgebirge Aue II. There were minor disturbances after the Germany and England match during the 2010 FIFA World Cup. An English flag was burned down amongst a mob of German supporters in Duisburg-Hamborn in Germany.

=== Greece ===
The first incidents between Football fans in Greece were recorded in June 1930, after the match between Aris and Panathinaikos at Thessaloniki. While Panathinaikos fans where arriving at the port of Piraeus from Thessaloniki, Olympiacos fans, who had not forgotten the big loss of their team (8–2) by Panathinaikos rioted with the green fans. In 1962, after Panathinaikos and PAOK match incidents, newspapers wrote for the first time that hooligans vandalized Leoforos Alexandras Stadium. On 19 November 1966, a big flag at the 13th gate of Leoforos Alexandras Stadium announced the arrival of a new group on the scene. Gate 13 would be the first organized group that over the years became a part of the club by affecting club decisions and by following the club on all possible occasions. PAOK fans made Gate 4 in 1976 and Olympiacos fans created the Gate 7 in 1981, the same year that AEK Athens fans created the Original 21.

In 1982, in a match between Aris – PAOK, Aristidis Dimitriadis was stabbed and later died in Thessaloniki's hospital. On 26 October 1986, at the Alcazar Stadium of Larissa, Charalambos Blionas, an AEL supporter, was killed by a flare pistol thrown by the PAOK fans. One month later Anastasios Zontos was stabbed to death in Omonoia square in the center of Athens before the match AEK Athens and PAOK. In January 1991, before the derby of AEK Athens. and Olympiacos, George Panagiotou died in the incidents between hooligans outside Nikos Goumas Stadium hit by flare pistol. On 10 April 1991, after the Greek Basketball Cup final between Panionios and PAOK in Piraeus, a car with PAOK supporters were violently attacked with an improvised molotov cocktail by unknown hooligans on Greek National Road 1. Two people burned alive and other two people were seriously injured, but they survived. The perpetrators were never found. On 15 May 2005, in Thessaloniki derby between Iraklis and Aris, Aris's hooligans called SUPER 3 invaded the pitch when the score was 2–1 for Iraklis. A football player Tasos Katsambis was injured during the clashes. The match was halted and Aris was punished with a 4-point deduction which led to their relegation to the Second Division.

In April 2007, all sports stadiums were closed down in Greece for two weeks following the death of a fan in a pre-arranged fight between hooligans in Athens on 29 March. The fight involved 500 fans of rival Super League Greece clubs Panathinaikos, which is based in Athens, and Olympiacos, which is based in nearby Piraeus. The Greek government immediately suspended all team sports in Greece and severed the ties between teams and their supporters' organizations. A Third Division match between Panetolikos and Ilioupoli was stopped for thirty minutes when players and fans clashed following a Panetolikos disallowed goal. Two players and a coach were sent to the hospital.

On 18 April, rival fans clashed with each other and riot police in Ioannina during and after a Greek Cup semi-final match between local rivals PAS Giannina and AEL. There was trouble during the game in which AEL won 2–0. Fans set fire to rubbish bins and smashed shop windows, while police tried to disperse them by firing tear gas.

On 10 October 2009, a group of about 30 hooligans disrupted an under-17 match between the academies of local rivals PAOK and Aris. Among the injured were a group of Aris players and their coach, a veteran PAOK player and another official. On 7 October 2011, a group of Greece national football team supporters firebombed the away section of a Euro 2012 qualifying match against Croatia in Athens. On 18 March 2012, during the match for the Super League in Athens Olympic Stadium between Panathinaikos and Olympiacos, home team Panathinaikos's fans who were inside the stadium attacked police forces with Molotov bombs, causing extended damages to the stadium, while police forces were unable to keep peace. On 5 January 2014, in Aigaleo, a suburb in Athens, the local team Aigaleo was hosting AEK Athens, a Third Division match. Before the match clashes broke up between AEK and Aigaleo fans. Indeed, the clashes resulted in the arrest of a security guard of the stadium who was accused of participating in the clashes among Aigaleo hooligans and also accused of committing attempted murder against an AEK fan.

On 15 September 2014, in Nea Alikarnassos, the team Herodotus was hosting Ethnikos Piraeus, a Third Division match. On 75' minute of the game, a clash between the supporters of the two clubs forced the referee to stop the match. During the clash, a 45-year-old supporter of Ethnikos Piraeus suffered a severe head injury and died two weeks later.

On 1 February 2022 an Aris fan, Alkis Kampanos, was stabbed to death by PAOK hooligans in Theodorou Gazi Street, Charilaou region of Thessaloniki, near the stadium of Aris in an attack against Aris' supporters. On July 6, 2023, it was announced that all 12 offenders were declared guilty, with seven of them sentenced to serve the rest of their lives in prison. The other five individuals were given prison terms ranging from 19 to 20 years.

In December 2023, following a series of violent sport related incidents, Greece banned fans from watching all Super League 1 championship football games for two months, the ban can also be applied to home European games matches.

In 2025, during a FCA Winners' Championship match between Pelopas Kiatou and Ionikos, in which Ionikos won 0-1, there were violent episodes in which rocks and bottles were thrown at Ionikos' players.

=== Hungary ===
Local derbies between Budapest teams Ferencvárosi Torna Club (based in Ferencváros) and Újpest FC (based in Újpest) are frequently occasions for violence between supporters.

=== Ireland ===
Incidents have been known to occur at games involving teams in Ireland. The most heated and well known derby in the League of Ireland is between Dublin rivals Shamrock Rovers F.C and Bohemian F.C. On 15 July 2019 a League of Ireland match was the scene of crowd trouble following a match between Dublin clubs UCD and Bohemians. Missiles were thrown from the crowd where the referee and players had to be escorted away.

=== Italy ===
The term ultrà or ultras is used to describe hooligans in Italy. Italy's ultras started in the late 1960s and early 1970s, as wannabe paramilitary groups, and gave themselves names such as Commandos, Guerrillas and Fedayeen. One group of Juventus' ultras are called Droogs (named after the violent types in A Clockwork Orange). Every Italian club has its ultra gang and big clubs have dozens.

Rome is dubbed "stab city" by the British press due to the number of stabbings from ultras there. John Foot, a professor of modern Italian history at University College London and an author on Italian football states: "They target the buttocks because the victim is not likely to die. They want to show they can hurt their rivals and get away with it." In 1984, ultras of A.S. Roma stabbed Liverpool fans in the aftermath of Liverpool winning the 1984 European Cup Final in Rome. In February 2001, Roma fans again stabbed Liverpool fans, and further knife attacks from Roma ultras include against fans of Middlesbrough (in 2006) and twice against Manchester United (2007 and 2009).

After a weekend of violence in January 2007, the president of the Italian Football Federation (FIGC) threatened to halt all league football. An official of amateur club Sammartinese died when he was caught up in a fight between players and fans in Luzzi, among numerous incidents of disorder in Florence, Bergamo and elsewhere. In February 2007, the Italian Football Federation (FIGC) suspended all football matches after Police Officer Filippo Raciti was killed due to liver damage from blunt object trauma when football violence broke out at a Serie A match between Catania and Palermo.

Before the 2014 Coppa Italia Final in Rome between Napoli and Fiorentina, three Napoli fans were shot outside the stadium before the match, two with arm injuries. Ciro Esposito, who was in a critical state after being shot in the chest, died in hospital on 25 June. Police, who found the gun, have stated that they do not believe that the shootings were related to other clashes by the two sets of fans: prior to the game, there were reports of firecrackers and other projectiles being thrown between them in the Tor di Quinto area of Rome. Kick-off was subsequently delayed as Napoli fans did not want the match to start without knowing the condition of the shot fans. When match organisers attempted to speak to the Napoli fans, accompanied by their midfielder Marek Hamšík, they were "pelted with flares and smoke bombs". Daniele De Santis, a Roma ultra was convicted of shooting Esposito and was sentenced to 26 years in prison on 24 May 2016; his sentenced was later reduced on appeals to 16 years on 26 September 2018.

=== Montenegro ===
In a Euro 2016 qualifying match in Podgorica on 27 March 2015, a few seconds in, a hooligan threw a flare at Russia goalkeeper Igor Akinfeev injuring him. The match was then temporarily suspended. Later fighting between the teams and more hooliganism rendered the game abandoned.

In March 2019, during a Euro 2020 qualifying match between Montenegro and England, several England players including Danny Rose, Raheem Sterling and Callum Hudson-Odoi were allegedly subjected to monkey chants from Montenegro fans.

=== Netherlands ===
The earliest recorded case of hooliganism in the Netherlands occurred when Rotterdam club Feyenoord and English club Tottenham Hotspur met at the 1974 UEFA Cup Final, where Tottenham hooligans destroyed portions of the Feyenoord stadium tribunes. It was the first time the Netherlands encountered such destructive hooliganism.

The most violent rivalry is between Ajax and Feyenoord. A particularly serious incident was the so-called "Battle of Beverwijk" on 23 March 1997, in which several people were seriously injured and one killed. The 2002–03 season was marked by similar incidents, and also by fighting between fans of Ajax and FC Utrecht.

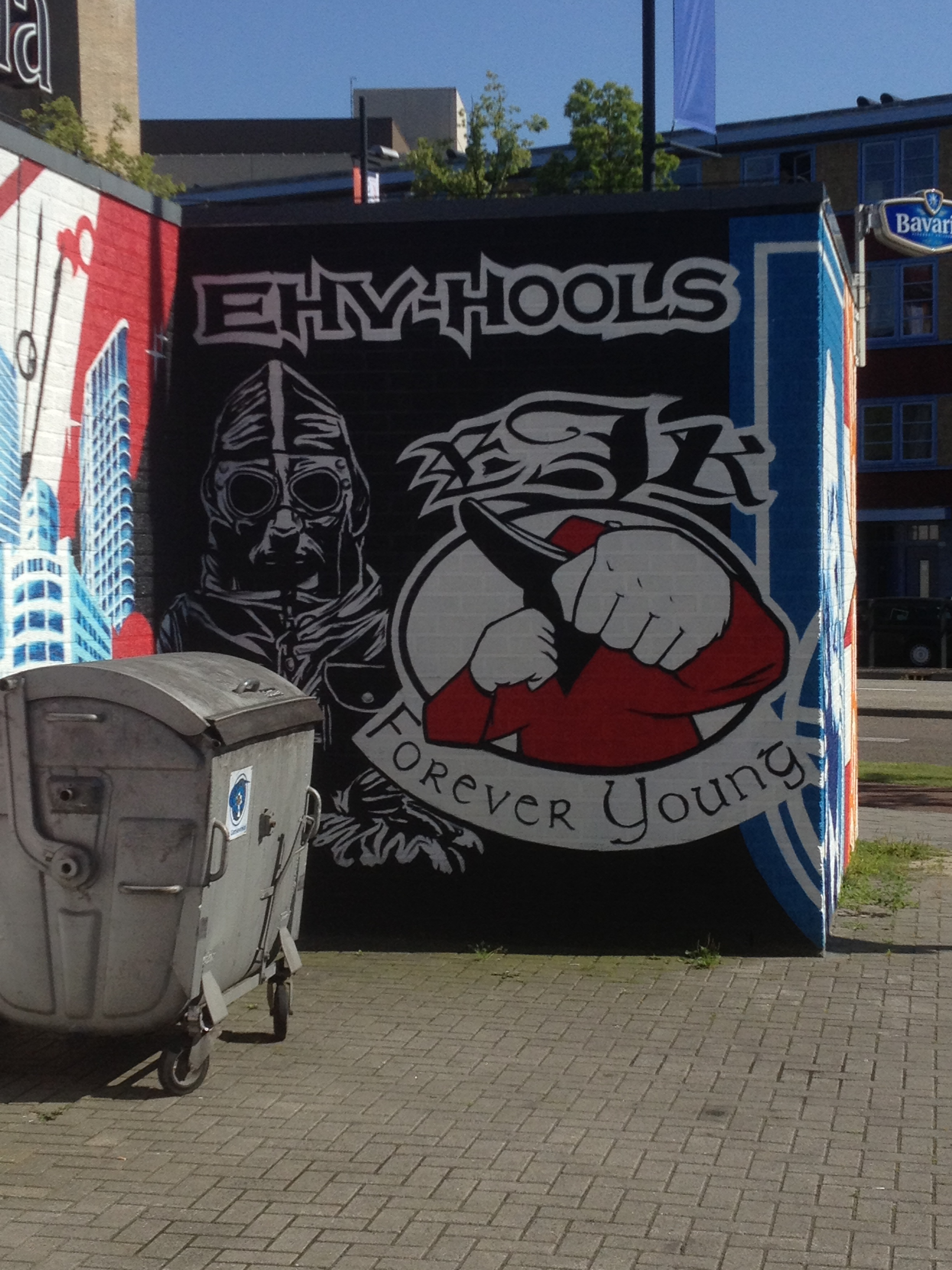
Mural on the wall near PSV's Philips Stadion

Hooliganism in the Netherlands peaked in the 1980s and 1990s. In later years it declined due to measures taken. Hooliganism still occurs from time to time but the prevalence within the stadiums has declined.

Other serious incidents include:

- 16 June 1990, English fans were arrested for brawling before a World Cup match against the Netherlands in Italy.
- 26 April 1999, 80 hooligans were arrested for rioting after Feyenoord won the title after having played NAC Breda.
- 19 February 2015, Feyenoord hooligans attacked Italian police with glass bottles and firecrackers in Piazza di Spagna before Europa League match A.S. Roma-Feyenoord,28 Dutch fans were arrested.
- 2023 saw a PSV Eindhoven supporter attack Sevilla's Serbian goalkeeper in February, 150 fans arrested in May for chanting anti-Semitic slogans on their way to a match and AZ Alkmaar fans wearing black hoods attacked West Ham United F.C. supporters in a fan zone in May.

=== Poland ===
Football hooligans in Poland are commonly known under Polish terms pseudokibice or kibole.

One of the biggest riots occurred at a World Cup qualifying match between Poland and England on 29 May 1993 in Chorzów.

Arranged football hooligan fights in Poland are known as ustawki; they have become common in Poland since the late 1990s. On 30 March 2003, Polish police arrested 120 people after rival football supporters fought during a match between Śląsk Wrocław and Arka Gdynia. During the riot, hooligans pelted police officers with stones and fought a running battle with knives and axes. One victim was seriously injured and later died in hospital.

During the 1998–99 UEFA Cup, a knife was thrown at Italian footballer Dino Baggio, from Parma F.C. by Polish supporters (allegedly Wisła Kraków fans), injuring his head. Supporters of Legia Warszawa also attracted negative attention in Lithuania during the match against Vetra Vilnius on 10 July 2007, where hooligans of Legia destroyed the home's team field and received a 2-year ban from all European Competitions.

The most notable hooligan incidents happened in Kraków where supporters of the Wisła Kraków and KS Cracovia teams have a rivalry called "The Holy War" that reportedly extended to killings of opposing fans. Several hooligans were criminally convicted for murdering opposing supporters in Kraków. However, members of both clubs organized fanclubs claim that violence is strictly related to hooligan gangs, or other organized crime groups that recruit hooligans into its ranks. Those gangs main activity is related to narcotics smuggling.

Country-wide riots involving football fans were seen in 1998 in Słupsk and 2015 in Knurów.

=== Russia ===
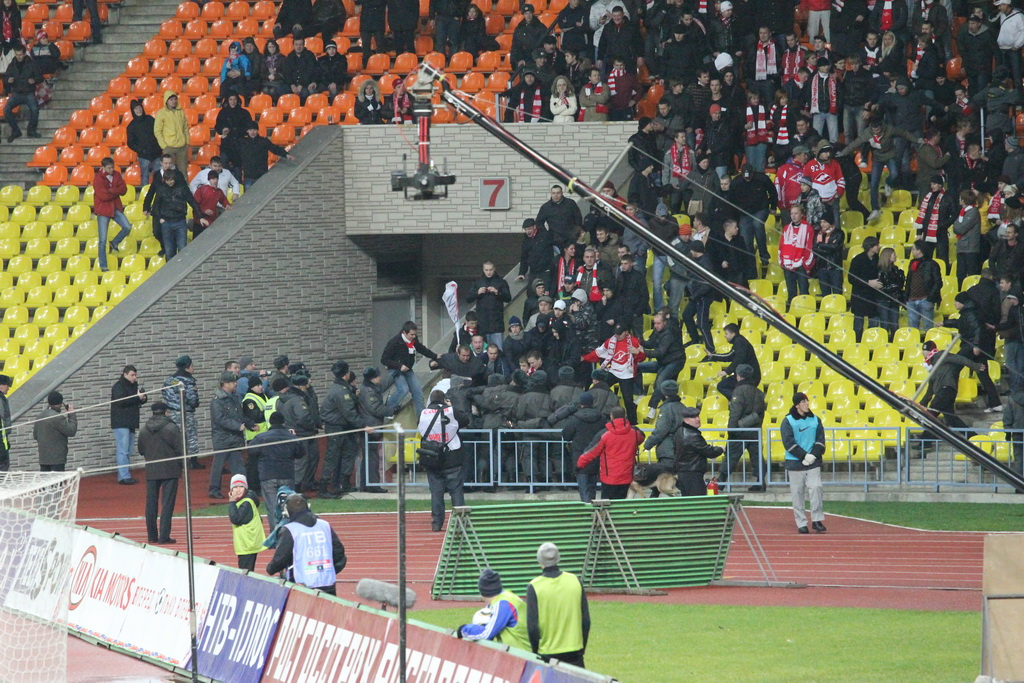
Hooligans of Spartak Moscow

Football hooliganism has become prevalent in Russia since the beginning of the 2000s. Hooligans are commonly associated with teams such as FC Spartak Moscow (Gladiators, Shkola, Union), PFC CSKA Moscow (Red Bluу Warriors, Gallant Steeds, Yaroslavka, Kids, Einfach Jugend), FC Dynamo Moscow (Capitals, 9-ka), FC Torpedo Moscow (Tubes, TroubleMakers), FC Lokomotiv Moscow (Red-Green's, Vikings, BHZ, Trains Team) – all from Moscow – and FC Zenit (Music Hall, Coalition, Snakes Firm) from Saint Petersburg, FC Rostselmash (Wild Legion) from Rostov-on-Don. Russian hooligans often show an underlying resentment towards Russia's perceived political rivals. At the UEFA Euro 2016 tournament, 50 Russian fans were deported and the international team fined €150,000 following co-ordinated violent attacks.

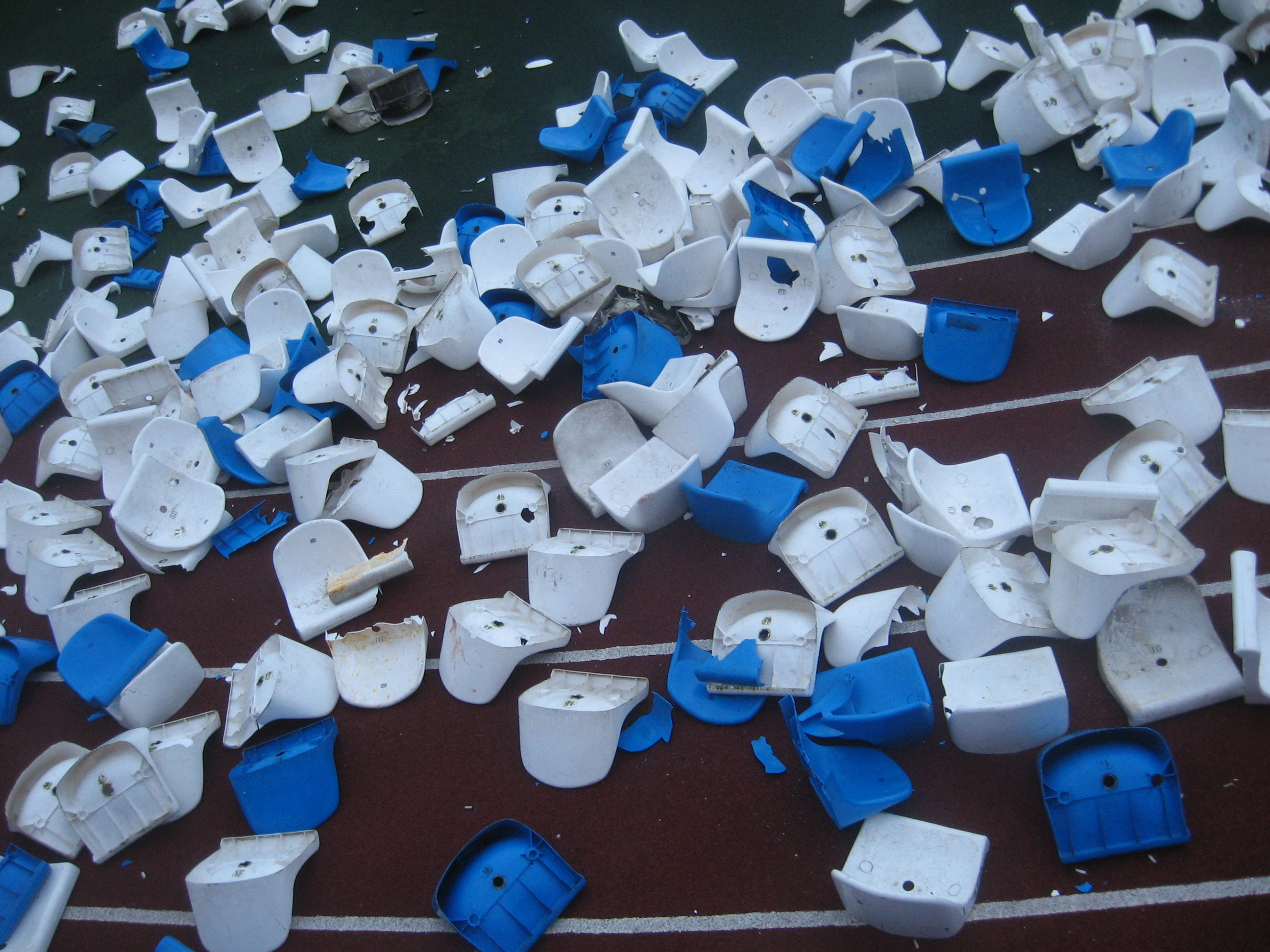
The aftermath of a football riot in Bryansk, Russia: broken chairs and seats.

=== Serbia ===
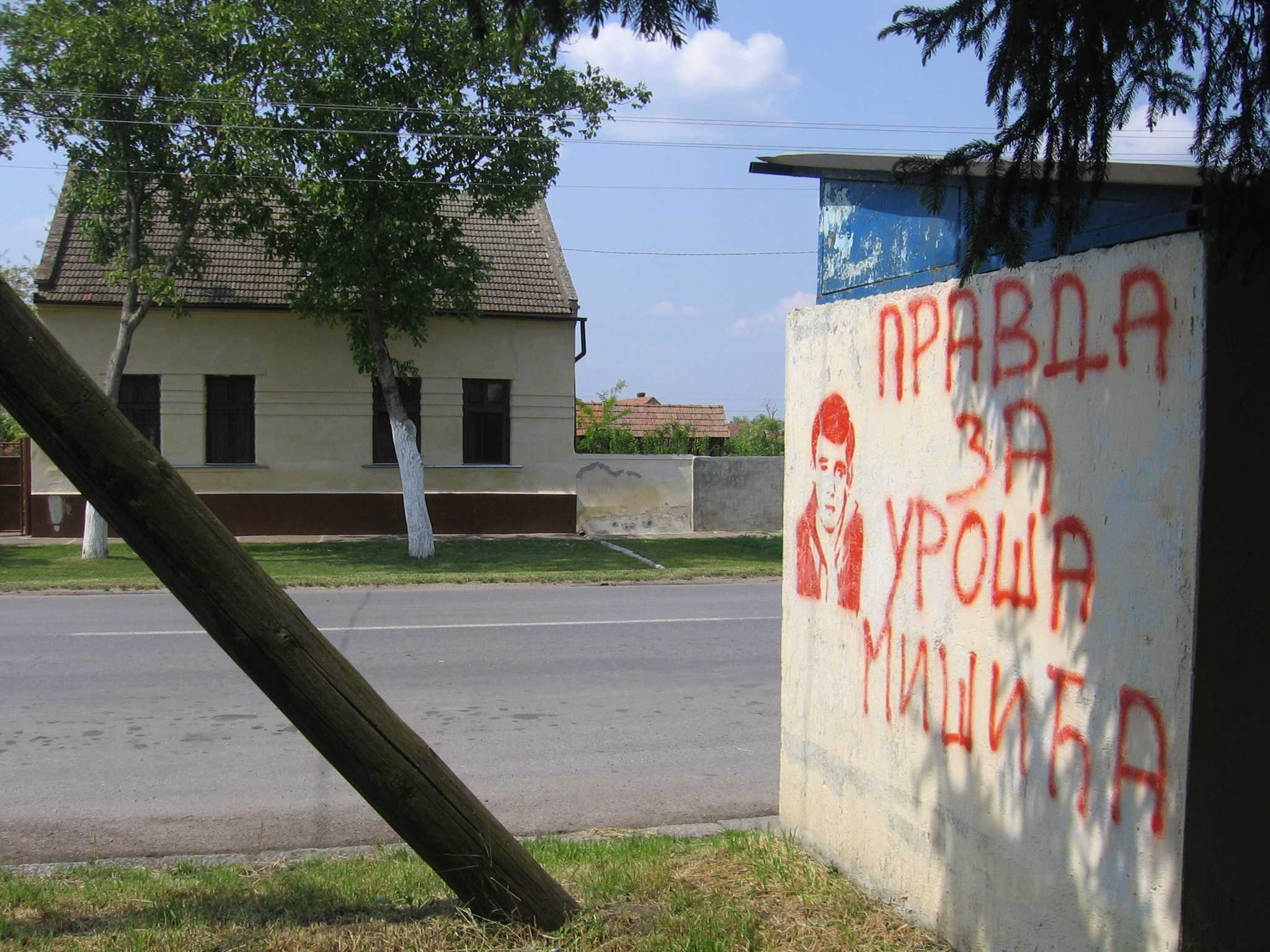
Hooliganism graffiti in Serbia

The most prominent groups of hooligans are associated with Belgrade and Serbia's two main clubs, Red Star Belgrade and Partizan Belgrade. They are known as the Delije ("Heroes") and Grobari ("Gravediggers"), respectively. FK Rad is a less-successful Belgrade club, whose associated hooligans, known locally as "United Force", have notoriously been involved in many violent incidents.

On 2 December 2007, a police officer was seriously injured when he was attacked during a Serbian Superliga match between Red Star Belgrade and Hajduk Kula. The officer was attacked with burning flares and broken seats and he had to fire warning shots in the air in self-defence. He was treated for burns, cuts and bruises in a nearby hospital. The following day, the Football Association of Serbia requested government help to help crack down on football hooliganism in the country. On 14 April 2008 a football fan was killed near Novi Sad after clashes between FK Partizan's Grobari and fans of FK Vojvodina. That same week, after a Red Star Belgrade-Partizan cup match, three people were injured and a bus destroyed by hooligans.

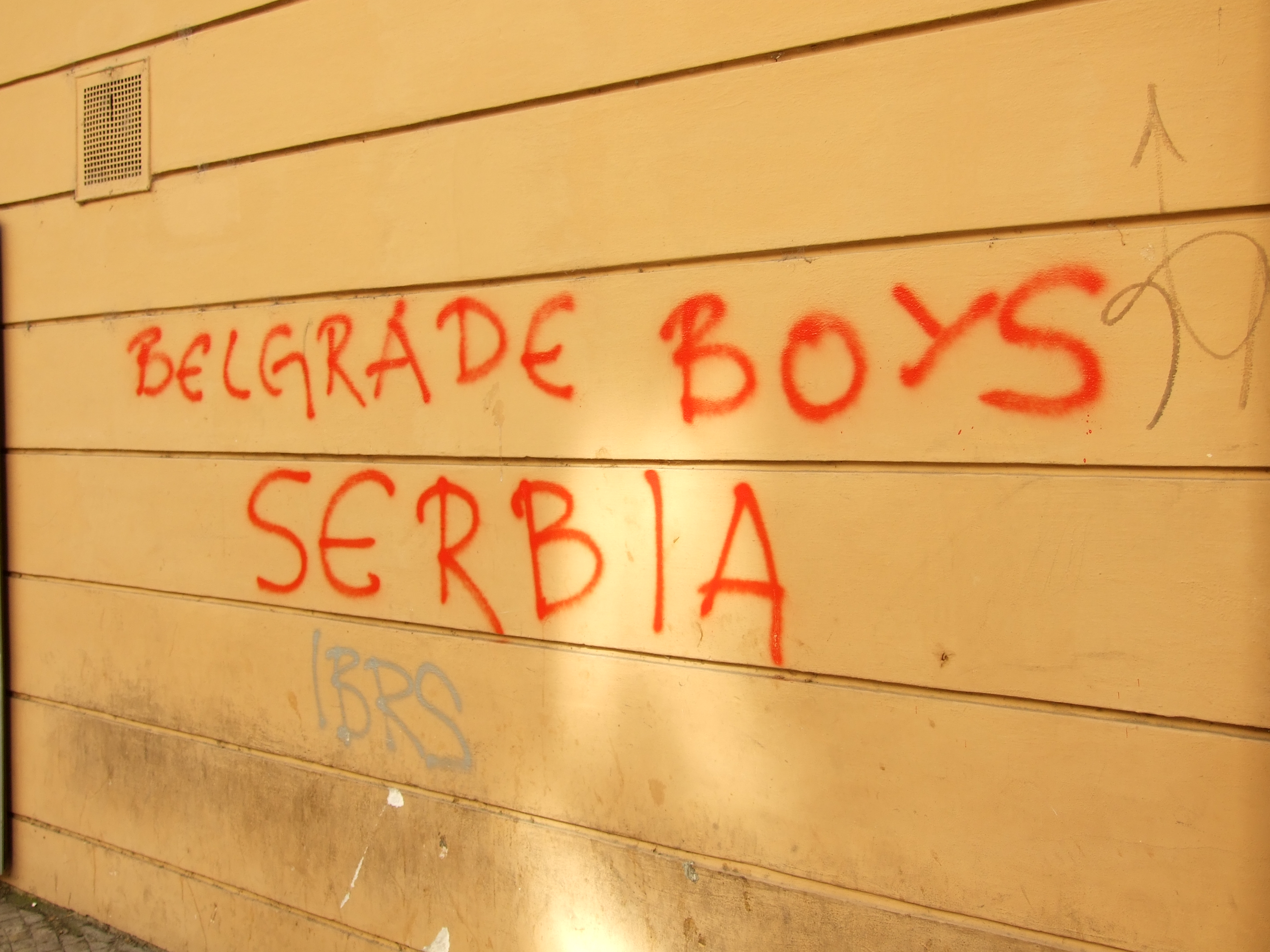
Football firm graffiti in Prague.

On 19 September 2008 a Serbian football hooligan was sentenced to ten years in jail for an attack against a police officer at a Red Star Belgrade–Hajduk Kula game. On 12 October 2010 Serbia's Euro 2012 Qualifying clash with Italy was abandoned after only 6 minutes after several Serbian fans threw flares and fireworks onto the pitch and caused severe trouble in and out of the ground. Partizan Belgrade were disqualified from the UEFA Cup, after crowd trouble in Mostar, Bosnia & Herzegovina. Partizan fans threw flares and stones and fought with supporters of Zrinjski Mostar and police. Fourteen Partizan fans were convicted for the murder of Toulouse FC fan Brice Taton in Belgrade. They attacked him and other fans with baseball bats and flares while wearing surgical masks. The hooligans received up to 35 years in prison.

In 2014, an Albania Serbia match saw all Albanian fans banned, the match progressed with abuse directed at Albanian players as well as threats and physical objects thrown, resulting in the match being abandoned.

=== Spain ===
England players such as Shaun Wright-Phillips and Ashley Cole endured monkey chants from Spain supporters.

The second source is the strong rivalry between Real Madrid and Barcelona. After transferring from Barcelona to Real Madrid, Luís Figo's appearance in Barcelona's Nou Camp stadium triggered a strong reaction: the crowd threw bottles, mobile phones and other objects (including a pig's head). Although nobody was injured the match was followed by a large discussion on fan violence in the Spanish Primera División.

Hooliganism is also rooted in deep political divisions arising from the General Franco fascist regime days (some Real Madrid, Atlético Madrid, Espanyol, Real Betis and Valencia ultras are linked to franquista groups), others with communist leanings (such as Deportivo La Coruña, Athletic Bilbao, Sevilla, Celta de Vigo, Rayo Vallecano) and the independence movements in Catalonia, Galicia and the Basque region. In Spain, organized hooligan groups are popularly called grupos ultra. Three notorious ones are the Boixos Nois, the Frente Atlético and the Ultras Sur, supporter groups of FC Barcelona, Atlético Madrid and Real Madrid respectively. There also have been local or regional disputes between rival teams, for example between Cádiz and Xerez, Betis and Sevilla, Osasuna and Real Zaragoza, or Deportivo de La Coruña and Celta.

In 1991, Frederiq Roiquier, a French supporter of Espanyol was killed by FC Barcelona hooligans who mistook him for a rival hooligan. In 1992, a 13-year-old child died at Espanyol's stadium after being struck by a flare. In 1998, Aitor Zabaleta, a supporter of Real Sociedad, was killed by an Atlético Madrid hooligan who was linked to a neo-Nazi group (Bastión), just before a match between these two teams. In 2003, a supporter of Deportivo La Coruña was killed in riots by hooligans following his club, when he tried to protect a supporter of the opposing team, SD Compostela. Since then, authorities have made attempts to bring hooliganism under control. In 2007, there were acts of hooliganism before a match between Atlético Madrid and Real Madrid, with several cars being destroyed and policemen injured by flares and bottles which were thrown at them.

Hooligan violence in Spain has decreased since the late 1990s due to an alcohol ban in sporting events as well as hooligan laws which attempt fines up to 600,000 euros and stadium bans.

Since 2003 the FC Barcelona hooligans, the Boixos Nois, are not allowed to enter Camp Nou. The hardcore Barcelona hooligans subgroups were involved in police operations against organized crime. In 2008, after a hooligan incident versus Espanyol, FC Barcelona very publicly took a stand on violence, saying it hoped to stamp out violence for good. In 2007 Atlético Madrid hooligans clashed with Aberdeen FC hooligans prior to a UEFA Cup match. In 2009 and 2010, Atlético hooligans also clashed with FC Porto and Sporting Clube de Portugal groups in Portugal during UEFA Cup games. During crowd disorder control manoeuvres after a match between Athletic Bilbao and FC Schalke 04, home supporter Iñigo Cabacas (who was not involved in hooliganism) was shot in the head with a 'Flash-ball' fired by a member of the Ertzaintza police service and later died. Later that year a Rayo Vallecano hooligan was arrested during riots in 14 November general strike and accused of terrorism.

In 2014, debate about eradicating Spanish hooligans arose after Frente Atlético members caused the death of a Riazor Blues (Deportivo La Coruña radicals) member by throwing him into the Manzanares river; and after members of the Boixos Nois stabbed two PSG supporters in Barcelona.

In 2016, football-related violence came once again to the public debate after a fight between Sevilla and Juventus supporters that occurred the day before their UEFA Champions League group stage match. Two Juventus supporters were stabbed (one of them was seriously injured but survived after being hospitalised) and a Sevilla supporter was hospitalized with head wounds caused by a glass bottle. Similarly, clashes between Spartak Moscow and Athletic Bilbao fans in 2018 received wider attention when one of the police officers involved in controlling the situation collapsed and died.

=== Sweden ===
Hooliganism began in Sweden in the early 20th century among fans of IFK Göteborg and Örgryte IS who clashed after and during derbies in Gothenburg. Modern hooliganism began in 1970 when fans of IFK Göteborg invaded the pitch, destroyed the goalposts and fought the police at the end of a match that relegated Göteborg from the Allsvenskan. Hooliganism in Sweden became a growing problem in the 1980s, but pitch invasions and violence at football grounds decreased in the late 1990s, when hooligan firms started pre-arranging their fights away from the grounds and the regular supporters. Seven clubs that have large organised hooligan firms are AIK (Firman Boys), IFK Göteborg (Wisemen) Djurgårdens IF (Djurgårdens Fina Grabbar (DFG)) Hammarby IF (Kompisgänget Bajen (KGB)) Malmö FF (True Rockers) GAIS (Gärningsmännen) and Helsingborgs IF (Frontline), though several other football, bandy and ice hockey clubs have active hooligan followings. In November 2002, 12 members of the Wisemen stood trial for inflicting life-threatening injuries on a Hammarby fan in 2001.

In August 2002, Tony Deogan, a member of the Wisemen, was killed after a pre-arranged fight against Firman Boys. Besides this fatality there have been several instances of hooligan firms intimidating and threatening players. Former AIK player Jesper Jansson received death threats and had his door painted orange (the color of Firman Boys) with the text Judas, after leaving for rival club Djurgårdens IF in 1996. Michael Hedström AIK former chief of security was also threatened and a mail bomb was sent to his address in 1998. The second fatality occurred in March 2014, when a 43-year-old Djurgården supporter was killed in Helsingborg in an assault on his way to Djurgården's opening match in the 2014 Allsvenskan against Helsingborg. After the man's death became known, Djurgården supporters invaded the pitch after 42 minutes of play, prompting officials to abandon the match.

=== Switzerland ===
Despite a reputation for generally being peaceful, Switzerland has faced significant issues with football hooliganism since the beginning of the 1980s, as in other European countries. In October 2018, Swiss Federal and Cantonal authorities noted that every third football game in Switzerland in the preceding six months had been marked by violent incidents. Statistically, most incidents involving militant supporters occurred in Zürich.

==== Instances of hooliganism ====
Switzerland's most severe incident, dubbed the 2006 Basel Hooligan Incident, 13 May 2006, occurred on the last day of the 2005–06 season, when FC Zürich defeated FC Basel at St. Jakob Park to win the Swiss championship with a last-minute goal. After the final whistle, angry Basel hooligans stormed the field and attacked Zürich players. The Zürich team were forced to celebrate in the upper deck of the stands while the fighting continued. There was similar fighting in the streets that night.

Switzerland's second most severe incident, happened October 2, 2011, during the Zurich Derby.

An August 2022 Europa League game between Swiss club BSC Young Boys and RSC Anderlecht in Brussels led to violent clashes in a restaurant. Belgian police saw this clash as a possible act of revenge by Anderlecht hooligans in response to violent activity at another Europa League game in Bern, Switzerland.

Another major incident occurred in November 2022, when FC Basel supporters clashed with supporters of FC Luzern in Lucerne, leading to street battles and clashes with police.

==== Police response ====
Swiss authorities take preemptive steps to prevent hooliganism both in Switzerland and abroad. Approximately 800 known Swiss hooligans were banned by the Swiss Federal Police from leaving Switzerland to travel to the 2016 European football championship.

=== Turkey ===
According to the Turkish Daily News, hooligan groups are well organised, have their own "leaders", and often consist of organised street fighters. These groups have a "racon" (code of conduct), which states that the intention must be to injure rather than kill and that a stab must be made below the waist. Other hooligans have fired firearms into the air to celebrate their team's victory, which has been known to accidentally kill innocent people watching the celebrations on their balconies.

Trouble has arisen during matches between Istanbul rivals Galatasaray and Fenerbahçe. However, the Turkish Football Federation has tightened security to try to contain the hooliganism. During the 2005 Turkish Cup final between Galatasaray and Fenerbahçe, 8,000 police, stewards and officials were employed to prevent violence. In 2006, the Turkish Football Federation introduced new measures to combat the threat of hooliganism and have made new regulations that allow the Professional Football Disciplinary Board to fine clubs up to YTL 250,000 for their fans' behavior. Repeat offenders could be fined up to YTL 500,000. Despite reports from the Turkish Football Federation, the Turkish police believe that football hooliganism is not a major threat and is "isolated incidents".

Before Galatasaray's semi-final UEFA Cup match with Leeds United in 2000, two Leeds fans, Christopher Loftus and Kevin Speight, were stabbed to death in Istanbul following street fights between Turkish and British hooligans. UEFA allowed the game to proceed and Galatasaray won, 2–0. Leeds complained because home fans jeered while a message of condolence was read for the victims. Galatasaray's players refused to wear black arm bands. The Leeds chairman at the time, Peter Ridsdale, accused Galatasaray of "showing a lack of respect". He also revealed that his team's players had received death threats before the match.

Ali Ümit Demir was arrested and sentenced to 15 years imprisonment for the stabbing, but the sentence was reduced to 5 years on the basis of heavy provocation, while five others were given lesser sentences of under four months. The families of those accused of attacking with knives are reported to have defended their actions and approved of their children punishing the "rude British people". Galatasaray fans were banned from traveling to the return match to try to avoid further clashes between fans, although there were reports of attacks by Leeds fans on Turkish television crews and the police. However, the Assistant Chief Constable in charge of policing the game believed that the number of arrests was "no worse than a normal high category game". Hakan Şükür was hit with projectiles from Leeds United supporters and the Galatasaray team bus was stoned after driving through an underpass. The game saw Emre Belözoğlu and Harry Kewell sent off and Galatasaray sealed their way to the final with a 2–2 score.

Violence also occurred between Arsenal fans (mainly from The Herd) and Galatasaray fans before the 2000 UEFA Cup final in Copenhagen in which a Galatasaray fan, an Arsenal fan and a Dane were said to have been stabbed. Galatasaray later won the match after a penalty shoot-out.

On 24 May 2001, 50 people were injured when fighting broke out at a match between French club PSG and Galatasaray at the Parc des Princes stadium.[16][17]PSG were initially given a record $571,000 fine, but it was reduced on appeal to $114,000. Galatasaray was initially fined $114,000 by UEFA, but it too was eventually reduced to $28,500.[18] In May 2001, six PSG fans from the Supporters Club, were arrested and charged with assault, carrying weapons, throwing items on the pitch and racism. The six were alleged to have deliberately entered a part of the Parc des Princes stadium where French fans of Turkish origin were standing, in order to attack them. The six were banned from all football stadiums for the duration of their trial.

During the 2003–2004 season, a Second League Category A, match between Karşıyaka and Göztepe on 8 February 2004, involved rival Karşıyaka and Göztepe supporters clashing and the match was subsequently stopped for 33 minutes. This was due to Karşıyaka leading 5–2 after coming back from a 2–0 deficit. After the match, Göztepe fans clashed with the police, seven police officers were wounded and fifteen Göztepe fans were arrested.

Bursaspor fans clashed with policemen at a match against Samsunspor match in the Süper Lig in Adapazarı at the end of the 2003–04 season. The match was played in Adapazarı due to events at a previous match between Bursaspor and Çaykur Rizespor. Bursaspor were playing to avoid relegation. Bursaspor won 1–0 the but were relegated to Category A after rivals won. After the match, Bursaspor fans ripped out and threw seats at the Sakarya Atatürk Stadium They also fought with craftsmen of Gölcük during their journey to Adapazarı. The Bursaspor-Diyarbakırspor game in March 2010 was suspended in the 17th minute after Diyarbakırspor supporters threw objects on the field. One object struck and knocked down an assistant referee.

On 7 May 2011, Bursaspor supporters clashed with the police ahead of the team's match with rival Beşiktaş. 25 police officers and 9 fans were injured in the violence. During the Fenerbahçe-Galatasaray game at the end of 2011–2012 season Fenerbahçe fans clashed with the police, causing $2 million of damage.

The 1967 Kayseri Atatürk Stadium disaster was the worst hooliganism event in Turkish history. It resulted in 40 deaths and 600 injuries. The violence started following provocation by the Kayserispor fans at half-time, after Kayserispor took the lead in the first half. Supporters of the two teams, some of them armed with bats and knives, began to throw rocks at each other, and fans fleeing the violence caused a stampede in front of the stand exits. The events in the stadium were followed by vandalism in Kayseri and days of riots in Sivas.

On 13 May 2013, a Fenerbahce fan was stabbed to death after the Istanbul derby. The Fenerbahce fan was on his way back home after the match between Fenerbahçe and Galatasaray, when he was attacked by a group of Galatasaray fans at a bus stop, and died in hospital later.

In 2015, confectioners Ülker—previously "one of Turkish football's biggest sponsors"—ceased their support, reportedly due to "low crowds, violence and poor atmosphere at matches".

In December 2023 the club president of MKE Ankaragücü football club was arrested after it appeared he punched the referee, fans also invaded the pitch following a late equaliser by the visiting team. All league football games were suspended in Turkey indefinitely following the assault, which resulted in the referee also being kicked repeatedly whilst on the ground.

=== United Kingdom ===
There are records of football hooliganism in the UK from the 1880s, and from no later than the 1960s the UK had a worldwide reputation for it – the phenomenon was often dubbed the English Disease. John Moynihan in The Soccer Syndrome describes a stroll around an empty Goodison Park touchline on a summer's day in the 1960s. "Walking behind the infamous goal, where they built a barrier to stop objects crunching into visiting goalkeepers, there was a strange feeling of hostility remaining as if the regulars had never left." The News of the World's Bob Pennington spoke of the "lunatic fringe of support that fastens onto them (Everton), seeking identification in a multi-national port where roots are hard to establish". The same newspaper later described Everton supporters as the "roughest, rowdiest rabble who watches British soccer".

Sectarian violence has long been a regular factor of crowd violence, as well as offensive chanting, at matches in Scotland between Celtic and Rangers. During the 2022 League Cup final at Hampden Park during the one-minute applause for the recently passed Hibernian chairman, Rangers fans sang "We are the billy boys". Hooliganism in Scottish football has reduced in intensity since its heights in the 1970s, however, it has seen a slight increase recently, with many teams having a small firm. Hearts were fined due to their fan's behaviour at Europa Conference matches against Istanbul and RFS.

At the Heysel Stadium disaster at Brussels, Belgium, in 1985 between Juventus and Liverpool, tensions before the match between the supporters led to a group of Liverpool fans rushing towards what was meant to be the "neutral" section (which was actually filled with Juventus supporters who procured tickets in Belgium) which led to the death of 39 Juventus fans who retreated and a wall collapsed. According to Bill Sergeant, then Detective Chief Inspector of Merseyside police who was in the Liverpool section with his son and also led the investigation into who was involved: "In my opinion, the tragedy resulted from a drink-fuelled aggressive response by Liverpool 'fans' to what they felt was unacceptable behaviour by Juventus supporters. They did not believe the Belgian police were protecting them." As a result of Heysel and prior incidents, English clubs were banned from all European competitions until 1990, with Liverpool banned for an additional year. Many of the football hooligan gangs in the UK used hooliganism as a cover for acquisitive forms of crime, specifically theft and burglary. In the 1980s and well into the 1990s the UK government led a major crackdown on football-related violence.

Birmingham City's multi-racial hooligan element gained the nickname "Zulus" because of the chant the Firm gave during build ups to fights with other firms. As explained in "One Eyed Baz's" Barrington Pattersons biography (ISBN 978-1-84358-811-5), confirming the firm's nickname was not derived from derogatory chanting by other firms.

In March 2000, the Seaburn Casuals (a Sunderland A.F.C. firm) fought with hooligans from the Newcastle Gremlins in a pre-arranged clash near the North Shields Ferry terminal, in what was described as "some of the worst football related fighting ever witnessed in the United Kingdom". The leaders of the Gremlins and Casuals were both jailed for four years for conspiracy, with 28 others jailed for various terms, based on evidence gained after police examined the messages sent by mobile phone between the gang members on the day.

On the day of the UEFA Euro 2020 final between England and Italy (which was played in 2021 due to the COVID-19 pandemic), riots broke out at the entrance to Wembley Stadium, and in both Leicester Square and Trafalgar Square; 86 people were arrested by police.

In September 2021, Leicester City played Napoli at home in a UEFA Europa League group stage match. Supporters of both clubs clashed, which resulted in a street fight around a mile away from the stadium, and disorder at the end of the match.

In September 2022, approximately 100 German hooligans in masks armed with machetes and knuckle dusters stormed a pub near Wembley Stadium before an England v Germany UEFA Nations League match.

=== Ukraine ===
Football hooliganism in Ukraine started in the 1980s. The first big fight (more than 800 people) involving football hooligans occurred in September 1987 between Dynamo Kyiv and Spartak Moscow fans in the center of Kyiv. The 1990s passed in relative silence, as there were no big fights between hooligans. On 5 September 1998 an important game between Ukraine and Russia's national football teams was played. Ukrainian hooligans began to unite in "national crews" to resist Russian fans. However, the mass union did not take place due to police intervention and were mainly composed of Ukrainian fans from Kyiv and Dnipropetrovsk. In March 2001, several crews united and attacked 80 Belarusian fans after match between Ukraine and Belarus national football teams. At that exact time hooligans and ultras were separated, due to changes of views on supporting movement. On 15 April 2002 about 50 right-wing Dynamo fans attacked the Jewish quarter in Kyiv, targeting local businesses, the synagogue, and Jewish worshipers.

Since 2005 clashes between hooligans have occurred mostly outside the city because of a greater police presence. During Euro 2012 several leaders of football hooligans came under government pressure. During the Revolution of Dignity the unification of all fans was announced and a ban was imposed on any provocation, such as burning attributes, fighting, or offensive songs. During the war in eastern Ukraine many hooligans and ultras went to the defense of the state. Parts of the Azov Brigade were formed from a FC Metalist Kharkiv hooligan group named "Sect 82". Ukraine's volunteer group, Kraken Regiment filled its ranks with "gym rats", bouncers and "ultras" and would show their love for Kharkiv's Metalist team as they had helped take back villages in the north of Kharkiv. BBC would report that Right Sector's organization in Kyiv would have its backbone made up of Russian-speaking, Ukrainian football fans sharing nationalist views.

Ukrainian hooligans have also been involved in incidents with foreign clubs. After the match between FC Dnipro and Saint Etienne in Kyiv several French fans were hospitalized after stabbings. On 20 August 2015 there was a big fight in Hydropark between hooligans from Legia Warsaw and from Dynamo and Zorya hooligans. The biggest clash since unification occurred in Kyiv, 6 December 2016 between Dynamo and Beşiktaş hooligans. A few days before Kyiv about 7,000 fans arrived from Istanbul. Two days before the match, different parts of Ukrainian capital witnessed the outbreak of numerous conflicts on the streets.

Typically the biggest confrontations involving Ukrainian hooligans occur in domestic competitions. The most famous confrontations are the Klasychne derby, South derby and South-West derby between FC Karpaty Lviv and Shakhtar Donetsk, as well as local derbys such as the Donetsk derby and the Kyiv derby.

== North America ==
=== Canada ===
Toronto FC formally banned supporter firm Inebriatti for hooliganism at a match between TFC and Ottawa Fury FC on July 18, 2018.

On May 10, 2023, during a Canadian Championship semi-final against rivals CF Montreal, Toronto FC fans traveled to the away end where a brawl began between the two sets of fans. Members of both groups were escorted out and away fans were banned from the next league derby.

=== El Salvador and Honduras ===
The Football War (Spanish: La guerra del fútbol), also known as the Soccer War or 100 Hour War, was a brief war fought by El Salvador and Honduras in 1969. It was caused by political conflicts between Hondurans and Salvadorans, namely issues concerning immigration from El Salvador to Honduras. These existing tensions between the two countries coincided with the inflamed rioting during the second North American qualifying round of the 1970 FIFA World Cup. Honduras and El Salvador met in the second North American qualifying round for the 1970 FIFA World Cup. There was fighting between fans at the first game in the Honduran capital of Tegucigalpa on 8 June 1969, which Honduras won 1–0. The second game, on 15 June 1969 in the Salvadoran capital of San Salvador, which was won 3–0 by El Salvador, was followed by even greater violence. A play-off match took place in Mexico City on 26 June 1969. El Salvador won 3–2 after extra time.

The war began on 14 July 1969, when the El Salvadoran military launched an attack against Honduras. The Organization of American States negotiated a cease-fire on the night of 18 July (hence "100 Hour War"), which took full effect on 20 July. El Salvadoran troops were withdrawn in early August. El Salvador dissolved all ties with Honduras, stating that "the government of Honduras has not taken any effective measures to punish these crimes which constitute genocide, nor has it given assurances of indemnification or reparations for the damages caused to Salvadorans". This led to border clashes between the two nations.

=== Mexico ===
Football hooliganism in Mexico appears to be low key, but there have been some incidents, such as small-scale fighting between fans of Monterrey and Morelia at a Primera División match in Monterrey in 2003. In June 1998, one man died and several people were injured when Mexico football fans rioted after Mexico lost to Germany in the World Cup. After the match, hundreds of riot police were brought in to restore order because fans were looting and rioting. Fans then clashed with the police, and many fans were injured or arrested. In March 2014 dozens of Chivas supporters clashed with police during their derby with Atlas. Several police were hospitalized. As a result, Chivas banned all of their supporters for the Clasico against Club America.

At the 2015 Gold Cup, Mexican hooligans threw trash and drinks in separate games against Trinidad and Tobago and Panama.

On 5 March 2022, a riot broke out during a match between Querétaro F.C. and Atlas F.C.

=== United States ===
Football (soccer) and other sports hooliganism overall is rare in the United States in part because of stricter legal penalties for vandalism and physical violence, club markets having their own territory of fans, venues banning weapons, and stricter security during games. Although isolated drunken fights at games do occur, they rarely escalate to major brawling comparable to Europe and Latin America. In contrast to Europe and Latin America, football (soccer) is traditionally viewed in the United States as a family-friendly event.

Nonetheless, some violence does still occur in soccer matches in the United States. On 20 July 2008, in a friendly match between Major League Soccer club Columbus Crew and English Premier League club West Ham United, in Columbus, Ohio, a fight broke out between rival fans. Police estimated more than 100 people were involved. An unruly encounter occurred between Toronto FC fans in 2009, upset from a loss in the Trillium Cup, and Columbus Crew fans. One Toronto fan was tasered by Columbus police. That same weekend, a riot was narrowly avoided at a packed Giants Stadium as members of the New York Red Bulls supporters club, Empire Supporters Club (ESC), and members of the New Jersey Sports and Exposition Authority security force clashed over what the ESC claimed was unfair and repeated mistreatment. Clashes also took place in the parking area around the stadium after the game, involving already ejected-for-life North Jersey Firm (NJF) members, and the New Jersey State Police were called to quell the situation. There were several arrests, mostly of known NJF hooligans.

A rare moment of violence broke out in Seattle in March 2010 after a pre-season Portland Timbers win in Seattle, when three Sounders fans attacked a Timbers fan, choking and dragging him with his team scarf. On 21 April 2013 in Portland, a Portland Timbers supporter was assaulted by a group of San Jose Earthquakes supporters. While he was sitting in his car, he had taunted his scarf at a group of San Jose Supporters, one of which ran toward him and attacked him through his car window, breaking his car windshield and assaulting him. San Jose's 1906 Ultras were subsequently banned by the club from traveling to away matches. After much debate, the ban was lifted. On 10 August 2015, fans of New York Red Bulls and New York City FC clashed in a brawl outside a pub throwing trash and exchanging blows. On 23 May 2016, fans of both NYCFC rioted outside Yankee Stadium in response to NYC FC's 7–0 defeat to the New York Red Bulls.

On 29 March 2025, after San Diego FC's third ever home game and first ever home win, LAFC and SDFC supporters engaged in fistfights outside Snapdragon Stadium. A video taken by a bystander went viral on social media, showing a well-known "Cuervos" member/leader punching a SDFC fan in the head.

== South America ==
=== Argentina ===
==== Early days (1920s–1940s) ====
The first murder related to Argentine football occurred on 21 September 1922 in Rosario, during the second half of a home match of Tiro Federal Argentino and Newell's Old Boys for the Copa Estímulo of the local first division. In a discussion between two fans, Enrique Battcock, a railroad worker and supporter of the home club (also former footballer and former member of the club's directing) was being questioned Francisco Campá (Newell's Old Boys' supporter and member of the club's directing) due to his behaviour. That ended when Battcock hit Cambá in the face. Cambá retired from the stadium, returned after a little while, extracted a gun and shot him, causing Battcock's death.

Another murder occurred in Montevideo on 2 November 1924 when Boca Juniors supporter José Lázaro Rodríguez shot and killed Uruguayan fan Pedro Demby after the final match of the South American Championship between Argentina and Uruguay, which Uruguay won.

On 14 May 1939 at the stadium of Lanús (in Greater Buenos Aires), in a match between the minor divisions of the home team and Boca Juniors, both teams began to fight after a foul committed by a Lanús player. Seeing this, Boca Juniors fans attempted to tear down the fence and invade the pitch, prompting the police to fire shots to disperse them, killing two spectators: Luis López and Oscar Munitoli (a 9-year-old).

The violence was not only among fans, footballers and police, but also against the referees. On 27 October 1946, during a match between Newell's Old Boys and San Lorenzo de Almagro at Newell's Old Boys stadium (in the city of Rosario), local fans tried to strangle the referee Osvaldo Cossio. The match was tied 2–2 when Cossio disallowed a goal by Newell's, and San Lorenzo de Almagro scored in the next play, aggravating the Newell's supporters. 89 minutes into the game, several Newell's Old Boys fans entered the pitch, hit the umpire and tried to hang him with his own belt.

==== Formation of barra brava culture (1950s–1990s) ====
Although violence in Argentine football was already present from the beginning, organized groups called barras bravas began to appear in the 1950s and continued to grow in the coming decades. With time, most football clubs in Argentina started to have its own organized group of violent supporters. Argentine barras bravas were reputed to be some of the most dangerous organized supporter groups in the world, with the most powerful of them during the 2000s being the barras bravas of Independiente (La Barra del Rojo), Boca Juniors, River Plate (Los Borrachos del Tablón), San Lorenzo de Almagro, and Newell's Old Boys.

The journalist Amílcar Romero sets 1958 as the year where journalism noticed the existence of the current barras bravas, with the random murder by the police of Mario Alberto Linker (a bystander who was watching a match between Vélez Sársfield and River Plate at the José Amalfitani Stadium). Linker was located in the grandstand of the River Plate fans when some of them started a fight and the police threw tear gas grenades. One grenade hit Linker in the chest causing his death. Before the emergence of these groups, visiting teams were harassed by rival fans, which prompted the organization of the barras bravas in response to that pressure:

In Argentine football, it was well established that if you played as the visiting team, you were inexorably in a tight spot. Although they were not barras bravas as we know them today, local fans would pressure you, and the police, when not looking the other way, would pressure you as well. That had to be offset by a doctrine that in the next decade became common currency: the only means by which to neutralize any effectual group with a reputation and capacity for violence, is with another, closer-knit group with as great, or greater, reputation for violence.

— Amílcar Romero

In this way, each club began having its own barra brava funded by the leaders of the institution. These groups were given some of their tickets and paid trips to the stadium in some occasions. For the barra brava to be prestigious, it had to be violent, so they began to increase the level of violence.

After the death of Linker, Argentine football began a phase marked by "habituation" to the violence of the barras bravas, and an increase in the number of deaths. According to Amílcar Romero, between 1958 and 1985, 103 deaths related to football violence took place in Argentina, an average of one every three months. However, the origin of such deaths is not always confrontation in the stadium, and range from the premeditated clash between barras bravas outside the sporting venues, police repression against disorder, infighting in a barra brava or "accidents".

In 1964 more than 300 football fans died and another 500 were injured in Lima, Peru in a riot during an Olympic qualifying match between Argentina and Peru on 24 May. On 11 April 1967 in Argentina, before a match between Huracán and Racing de Avellaneda, a 15 year old Racing fan was murdered by the Huracán barra brava at the Tomás Adolfo Ducó stadium. Over 70 Boca Juniors fans died in 1968 when crowds attending a Superclásico in Buenos Aires stampeded after youths threw burning paper onto the terraces and the exit was locked.

From the 1980s onwards, the nuclei of the biggest barras bravas began to attend the World Cup matches of the Argentina national football team. That caused fights against supporters of other countries (sometimes were hooligans or ultras) and between the Argentine barras bravas themselves. Also, in the 1980s and the 1990s the highest levels of violence in the history of the Argentine football were recorded, and there was a new phenomenon: the internal fragmentation of the barras bravas. It was produced by the emergence of sub-groups with their own names inside the barras bravas. Sometimes these sub-groups fought among themselves to have the power within the barra brava to which they belonged.

An example of the violence of these years was the death of Roberto Basile, that happened before the start of a match between Boca Juniors and Racing in 1983 in the Bombonera stadium. Roberto, who was a Racing supporter, died after being pierced in the neck by a flare thrown from the Boca Juniors stand.

In 1997 a member of La Guardia Imperial (barra brava of Racing de Avellaneda) was murdered by an Independiente supporter.

==== High-profile incidents (2000s–present) ====
In 2001, another supporter of Racing was killed, and the barra brava of Independiente was the main suspect. Independiente and Racing (both from the city of Avellaneda, in the Greater Buenos Aires) have a huge rivalry, the second most important in Argentina but maybe the fiercest (notably, their stadiums are only 300 meters apart).

The next year, one fan was killed and 12 people injured, including six police officers when fans of Racing Club de Avellaneda and Club Atlético Independiente clashed in February 2002.

An Independiente fan was shot dead, and another fan was shot in the back and hospitalized when about 400 rival fans fought outside Racing Clubs stadium, El Cilindro, in Avellaneda before the match. Between 70 and 80 people were arrested as a result. The match started late when Independiente fans threw a smoke bomb at Racing Club goalkeeper, Gustavo Campagnuolo. That same weekend, 30 people were arrested and 10 police officers injured when fighting broke out at a match between Estudiantes de La Plata and Club de Gimnasia y Esgrima La Plata in La Plata.

A 2002 investigation into football hooliganism in Argentina stated that football violence had become a national crisis, with about 40 people murdered at football matches in the preceding ten years. In the 2002 season, there had been five deaths and dozens of knife and shotgun casualties. At one point, the season was suspended and there was widespread social disorder in the country. The first death in 2002 was at a match between fierce rivals Boca Juniors and River Plate. The match was abandoned and one Boca Juniors fan was shot dead. Boca Juniors, one of the largest clubs in Argentina, may have the largest barra brava element in the country (it is similar to the barras bravas of Independiente and River Plate), with their self-styled leader, Rafael Di Zeo, claiming in 2002 that they had over 2,000 members (however there are doubts about the reliability of this information). The Boca group, known as Jugador N° 12 (Player Number 12) has a long history of violence. In 2002 Diego Maradona was alleged to remain friends with the group's leaders, in spite of their reputation. In 2004, while driving up to Rosario to watch their side play Rosario Central, Los Borrachos del Tablón (River's Barra Bravas) confronted a bus of Newell's firm (one of the big rival firms) on Highway 9, in a battle that killed two Newell's fans. Up to this day, some members of Los Borrachos still face charges because of the deaths.

In 2005 a footballer, Carlos Azcurra, was shot and seriously wounded by a police officer, when rival fans rioted during a Primera B Nacional match between local Mendoza rivals (but not a derby) San Martín de Mendoza and Godoy Cruz Antonio Tomba. At half-time, fans had thrown rocks onto the pitch, and just before the end of the match, fans from both clubs invaded the pitch and started fighting. The players who had stayed on the pitch, including Ezcurra, tried to calm the fans, and he was shot when police tried to stop the fans by firing rubber bullets.

During the 2006 FIFA World Cup in Germany, there was a confrontation between 6 members of the barra brava of Independiente and 16 members of the barras bravas of Boca Juniors and Defensa y Justicia (both were together) in the Czech Republic (the country where the three barras bravas were housed). As a result of the fight, a supporter of Boca Juniors had to be hospitalized.

In 2007, during a match of the promotion/relegation playoff of the 2006–2007 season between Nueva Chicago and Tigre (in the Nueva Chicago's stadium), a fight broke out between the barras bravas of both teams. When a penalty was given to Tigre (who was winning the match 2–1, a result that relegated to Nueva Chicago to the Second division) in the 92nd minute, the barra brava of Nueva Chicago invaded the pitch and ran in the direction of the stand occupied by the supporters of Tigre to attack them. After this, there were serious riots near the stadium (not only caused by the barras bravas, but also by regular supporters) and as a result, a fan of Tigre died.

On 19 March 2010 in a bar in Rosario, the ex-leader of the Newell's Old Boys barra brava (Roberto "Pimpi" Camino) was fatally shot. Camino and his sub-group led the barra brava from 2002 to 2009, when they were expelled from it due to their defeat at the hands of another sub-group, which currently dominates La Hinchada Más Popular, the barra brava of Newell's Old Boys. Some members of the now main sub-group are the suspects of the murder, and the bar's owners are suspected of helping them.

In the early morning of 4 July 2010 (the next day of the match between Argentina and Germany for quarter-finals of the 2010 FIFA World Cup) in Cape Town, South Africa, there was a fight between some members of the barras bravas of Independiente and Boca Juniors. During the brawl, one member of the Boca Juniors barra brava lost consciousness after being brutally beaten by the Independiente fanatics. He was admitted to a hospital in the city and died there on 5 July.

On 14 May 2015, in the second leg of the 2015 Copa Libertadores round of 16 match between River Plate and Boca Juniors at La Bombonera, hooligans sprayed a substance which irritated River Plate players' eyes, and the game was suspended. CONMEBOL opened up disciplinarily proceedings against Boca Juniors on the incident and were later disqualified from the tournament two days later. River Plate would later advance to the quarterfinals and eventually, win the tournament.

From 1922 to 2022, there were 342 deaths related to Argentine football, excluding the 300 dead in Peru in 1964.

=== Brazil ===
Fans in Brazil join in organized groups known as torcidas organizadas ("organized supporters") often considered criminal organizations that differ in many aspects from European hooligans. They act as the main supporters of each club and often sell products and even tickets. They have up to 60,000 members and are often involved in criminal activities other than fights such as drug dealing and threats to players. These fans establish alliances with other "torcidas organizadas" as they are called such as the alliance between Torcida Mancha Azul (Avaí Futebol Clube), Força Jovem Vasco (CR Vasco da Gama), Galoucura (Atlético Mineiro) and Mancha Verde (SE Palmeiras), the alliance between Torcida Independente (São Paulo F.C.), Torcida Jovem (CR Flamengo), Máfia Azul (Cruzeiro Esporte Clube) and Leões da TUF (Fortaleza Esporte Clube) and some other alliances. The "torcidas organizadas" are usually bigger and more committed to the spectacle in the stadiums than the English hooligan fans but they often schedule fights against rival groups where many are injured and killed.

Fans of local rivals TJP – Torcida Jovem Ponte Preta (Associação Atlética Ponte Preta) and TFI -Torcida Fúria Independente (Guarani Futebol Clube) clashed and rioted at a match in Campinas in 2002. Violence had been expected, and just before kick-off, fans started fighting. Police tried to intervene but were pelted by stones. As the fighting continued inside the stadium, a railing collapsed and numerous fans fell over 13 ft (four metres) into a pit between the stands and the pitch. Over 30 people were injured.

=== Uruguay ===
Following a 5–0 victory against arch-rivals Nacional in April 2014, Peñarol have adopted an increasingly violent attitude in the Uruguayan Clasico. While losing a championship play-off match against Nacional in June 2015, Peñarol's fans started a riot that delayed the game by 15 minutes before it was called off. In March 2016, Pablo Montiel – a supporter of Nacional – was shot to death by Peñarol fans while walking in the same neighborhood as Peñarol's new stadium. Ignacio Ruglio, a board member of Peñarol who have openly spread lies about Nacional, was interrogated by police following the murder of Montiel. In November 2016, the Uruguayan Clasico was cancelled before kick-off after Peñarol's supporters started a riot at the Estadio Centenario – one supporter was arrested holding a pistol, intended to shoot down Nacional players from the Amsterdam tribune. After winning a Clasico for Peñarol in September 2017, team captain Cristian Rodríguez openly called for murdering Nacional fans while celebrating the victory.

== East Asia ==
=== China ===
Football hooliganism in China is often linked to accusations of corrupt refereeing, with Chinese football being plagued by allegations of match fixing in the early 2000s. After a match in 2000 between Shaanxi National Power and Chengdu F.C. in Xi'an, football fans clashed with police who used tear gas and water cannons to disperse the crowd. Eight people were arrested but later released. In March 2002 hundreds of football fans rioted at a match in Xi'an between Shaanxi National Power and Qingdao Etsong Hainiu, as a result of fans' suspicions of match-fixing.

Two years earlier, following crowd trouble at a match also in Xi'an, the government demanded more action to stamp out football hooliganism.

In June 2002, riots in Fuzhou, Fujian had to be put down by heavily armed paramilitary police. The disorder started when fans were unable to watch the World Cup match between China and Brazil at an outside broadcast. On 4 July 2004 fans rioted in Beijing when China lost 3–1 to Japan in the final of the AFC Asian Cup. Japanese flags were burned and a Japanese Embassy official's car vandalised. Japanese fans had to be protected by the police, and bussed to safety. The rioting was attributed to ill-feeling toward Japan for atrocities committed before and during the Second World War.

=== North Korea ===
There was brief unrest among North Korean fans at an international football match against Iran at the Kim Il-sung Stadium in Pyongyang, North Korea on 30 March 2005, when a North Korean player got into an argument with the Syrian referee.

=== Japan ===
There was no hooliganism in Japan before the J.League was established in 1993, but since its inception, Urawa Red Diamonds, Kashima Antlers, Gamba Osaka, and other players have engaged in hooliganism.

In particular, the actions of the Urawa hooligans were called into question by posting a discriminatory banner reading "Japanese only" and prohibiting foreigners from entering the home side stand during a home game on March 8, 2014, leading to the first J.League game without spectators.

Urawa was not satisfied with this and continued to engage in hooliganism, and on August 2, 2023, during the Emperor's Cup match against Nagoya, they relentlessly chased Nagoya supporters, claiming they had been provoked after the match, damaging the Nagoya banner, and attacking security guards. More than 70 people were punished, including for assault, and their qualifications for next year's Emperor's Cup were revoked.

== South Asia ==
=== Bangladesh ===
Football hooliganism in Bangladesh does not appear to be a major problem. However, in August 2001, 100 people were injured when thousands of football fans rampaged at a Premier Division match between Mohammedan Sporting Club and Rahmatganj Sporting Club in the Bangabandhu National Stadium, Dhaka. When the referee disallowed a penalty, Mohammedan fans invaded the pitch, throwing stones at the police, who had to fire tear gas at the fans to try and restore order. Outside the stadium dozens of cars and buses were damaged and set on fire.

=== India ===
On 16 August 1980, supporters of Kolkata teams Mohunbagan and East Bengal engaged in a violent clash that killed 16 and injured over 100. Kolkata police had to intervene and use force to take control of situation.

=== Nepal ===
Nepali supporters at Dasarath Stadium occasionally tend to act violently during international matches. Cell phones and other objects were thrown during a match against Bangladesh, and coins were hurled at players at a match against Palestine.

== Southeast Asia ==
=== Indonesia ===
Football hooliganism in Indonesia dates back to the late 1980s, stemming from the rivalries among fans of Persib Bandung, Persebaya Surabaya, PSMS Medan, PSM Makassar and intra-regional derbies. Violence in football in Indonesia has increased since 2000 until now. The hottest derby is the Indonesia derby between Persija Jakarta from the capital city of Indonesia and Persib Bandung from the West Java capital provincial. Another hot derby is the East Java derby between Persebaya Surabaya from the provincial capital of East Java and Arema of the biggest competitors in the province.

Clashes and rivalries also occurred between supporters of clubs from different islands, such as the rivalry between Persija Jakarta and PSM Makassar which heated up again in 2019, especially after the 2018 Piala Indonesia final which brings together the two clubs. Then also between the supporters of Persija Jakarta with Persipura Jayapura and Persiwa Wamena from Papua which heated up in the era of the Indonesia Super League.

Between 1995 and 2018 there have been 70 deaths in Indonesian football, 21 deaths of which occurred at the hands of a mob. Football hooliganism in Indonesia often causes damage to stadium properties, and clashes can then spread outside the stadium to nearby streets.

The deadliest incident occurred on 1 October 2022, after host Arema FC lost to Persebaya for the first time at home in 23 years. At least 129 people died following a stampede after police fired tear gas at supporters in an effort to stop a pitch invasion. The incident is the deadliest football-related disaster in Asia, as well as the second-deadliest worldwide. Arema ultras also damaged parts of Kanjuruhan Stadium and torched police vehicles.

Small scale riots also sometimes occur in West Java. Involving two local teams, namely Persib from Bandung, the capital city of the province and Persikabo 1973 from Bogor Regency, an area south of the Indonesian capital, Jakarta. The rivalry between the two clubs is known as the Pasundan derby or the West Java derby. Likewise with the rivalry between two lower division teams from North Maluku, Persiter based in Ternate and Persikota based in Tidore. This rivalry, known as the Old North Maluku derby, is the hottest football rivalry in the region, In fact, many factors that originally did not originate from football can spread into it. However, after the establishment of the Malut United through the acquisition of Putra Delta Sidoarjo in 2023, the supporters from North Maluku can unite to support the club because it represents their longing for a professional club that represents their region.

=== Malaysia ===
Football hooliganism in Malaysia has occurred frequently in league or international matches since 1980 and is frequently associated with various clubs, such as Kedah FA, Kelantan FA, Johor Darul Ta'zim F.C. (simply known as JDT), Pahang FA, Sarawak FA, Selangor FA and Terengganu FA. At the 2014 AFF Championship, after Malaysia lost 1–2 to Vietnam at home, some Malaysian hooligans rushed to the Vietnamese supporters' area and began attacking Vietnamese fans, resulting in injuries. After a series of investigation, a number of the hooligan supporters were found to be from the "Inter-Johor Firm", a group of JDT supporters and have since been banned from attending any matches.

In May 2015, during the final of the FA Cup, Singaporean LionsXII players and their fans were stranded at the Sultan Mizan Zainal Abidin Stadium for about five hours after Terengganu fans turned violent over their team's failure to reach the final. Also in the same year on 8 September 2015, a 2018 World Cup qualification match between Malaysia and Saudi Arabia was abandoned after Malaysian hooligans disrupted the match and attacked Saudi supporters. The scoreline before the match was abandoned was 1–2 in favour of Saudi Arabia.

Another incident during the 2017 Southeast Asian Games hosted by Malaysia occurred on 21 August, when two supporters from Myanmar was assaulted by a group of unidentified assailants after the end of the men's football group match between Malaysia and Myanmar. On 24 November 2018, it was reported that around 20 Burmese fans, including girls, waiting for a bus in Kuala Lumpur were attacked by around 30 Malaysians who physically and verbally assaulted the, after the end of a group match between Malaysia and Myanmar at the 2018 AFF Championship. According to the fans, the attackers shouted "babi" (pigs) at them as some of them ran off from the scene. Those injured in the attack had to be taken to a nearby hospital with the help of a local charity organisation. Three of the girls suffered serious injuries and their mobile phones also snatched by the attackers. On 19 November 2019, Malaysian and Indonesian fans clashed and threw smoke bombs, flares and bottles at each other in a FIFA World Cup qualification match between Malaysia and Indonesia, which ended in a 2–0 win for the home side. Security officials arrested 27 Malaysians and 14 Indonesians.

=== Myanmar ===
Hooliganism at Myanmar's football matches is common. On 1 October 2011, FIFA announced that Myanmar would be banned from the 2018 World Cup qualifiers after a home tie against Oman had to be stopped when the crowd pelted the opposition with bottles and rocks. However, the ban was lifted on 7 November 2011 after FIFA reconsidered the appeal made by the Myanmar Football Federation (MFF). During the 2013 Southeast Asian Games which Myanmar hosted, the sudden defeat of Myanmar football team to Indonesia in the group match that caused them to fail to qualify for the semi-finals led the Myanmar hooligan supporters to tear up seats, hurl stones at officers and burn Southeast Asian Games memorabilia and other billboards.

=== Thailand ===
Hooliganism has begun to cast a dark cloud on Thai football, especially in the 2010s, with several club or international matches being marred with violence. During the 2014 Thai Premier League, the 3–1 victory of Muangthong United against Singhtarua sparked violence between the supporters of the two clubs. Another incident involving Thai supporters following Thailand's victory against Vietnam in the 2015 AFF U-19 Youth Championship hosted by Laos began when they set off signal flares, causing the police to fire a warning shot after they entered the stands to quell the unrest and were met with a violent response. Also after their victory in the 2016 AFF Championship, the Football Association of Thailand (FAT) was fined U$30,000 for failing to prevent the hooligan supporters in their own stadium from setting off flares. Despite its cooperation with police in finding and arresting the hooligans, Thailand has been warned that severe punishment will be given if it happens again at any future FIFA or AFC matches.

=== Vietnam ===
Shortly after the end of the second leg 2016 AFF Championship semi-finals match in Hanoi between Indonesia and Vietnam, the Indonesian team while on their way back to their hostel was suddenly attacked by angry Vietnamese supporters riding motorcycles who threw two large rocks into their bus following the failure of the Vietnamese national team to qualify for the finals, resulting in minor injuries to an Indonesian goalkeeping coach and their team doctor. A replacement bus was eventually dispatched with heavy security from the Vietnamese authorities following the attacks. The Vietnam Football Federation (VFF) and other Vietnamese fans issued an apology for the incident.

== West Asia ==
=== Israel ===
In the 2000s, tensions surrounding the Arab–Israeli conflict spilled over into sporadic riots between Jewish and Arab Israeli football fans. In December 2000 it was reported that every club in Israel was on a final warning following escalating violence and intimidation at matches.

A number of incidents have involved Beitar Jerusalem, including racist abuse against overseas players, anti-Arab chants, use of smoke bombs and fireworks, and rioting. Beitar has a hooligan firm, La Familia, whose members consider Israeli Arabs to be their enemy. In November 2007 the Israel Football Association (IFA) ordered Beitar to play their game against the Arab club, Bnei Sakhnin behind closed doors after Beitar fans, led by La Familia, broke a minute's silence for former Prime Minister of Israel, Yitzhak Rabin and sang chants in praise of his assassin, Yigal Amir. After a pitch invasion led by La Familia on 13 April 2008, when Beitar were leading Maccabi Herzliya, 1–0, and about to win the Israeli Premier League, the match was abandoned and the points were awarded to their opponents. Beitar was docked two points and had to play its remaining home games behind closed doors.

=== Jordan ===
Football riots in Jordan are generally regarded as an expression of tension between the country's Palestinian ethnic group and those who regard themselves as ethnically Jordanian, the two groups being of roughly equal size.

In December 2010, rioting broke out following a game between rival Amman clubs Al-Wehdat and Al-Faisaly clubs. Some Al-Faisali fans threw bottles at Al-Wehdat players and their fans. About 250 people were injured, 243 of them Al-Wehdat fans, according to senior officials from the hospitals. According to Al Jazeera, supporters of Al-Wehdat are generally of Palestinian origin, while Faisaly fans are of Jordanian origin. A similar riot occurred in 2009.

=== Syria ===
On 12 March 2004 a fight between Arab and Kurdish supporters of rival Syrian football clubs at a match in Qamishli, 450 miles (720 km) north east of Damascus, escalated into full-scale riots that left over 30 people dead and hundreds injured.

== Africa ==
=== Democratic Republic of the Congo ===
Four died when troops opened fire at a derby match between AS Vita Club and DC Motema Pembe at the Stade des Martyrs in Kinshasa in November 1998. In April 2001, 14 people died following a stampede at a derby match between TP Mazembe and FC Saint Eloi Lupopo. When fans invaded the pitch after Mazembe had equalised, and rival fans started throwing missiles at each other, the police fired tear gas, and fans rushed to escape the effects of the tear gas. In the resulting stampede, 14 people died. Fans of the two clubs are alleged to have a history of hatred and violence towards each other.

=== Egypt ===
In January 2006 riot police attacked Libyan fans in the Cairo International Stadium after they threw missiles at the Egyptian fans in the tier above them during a match between the Egypt national football team and the Morocco national team. The Libyan fans had stayed on to watch the match after they had seen Libya lose 2–1 to Ivory Coast and had started taunting the home supporters. The Egyptian fans responded by asking them to leave the stadium and verbally attacking them at half time, and when, despite a plea to stop, it continued into the second half, the riot police were called in. The Libyan Football Association were fined $7,000 by the disciplinary commission of the Confederation of African Football.

A melee broke out on 1 February 2012, after fans of Al-Masry, the home team in Port Said, stormed the field following a rare 3–1 win against Al-Ahly, Egypt's top team. Al-Masry supporters attacked the Al-Ahly players and their fans with knives, swords, clubs, stones, bottles, and fireworks. At least 79 people were killed and over 1,000 were injured on both sides in the Mediterranean port city. On 26 January 2013 rioting broke out in Port Said in response to the announcement of death sentences for 21 individuals involved in the February 2012 disturbance. A mob of Al-Masry supporters attempted to storm the prison where the sentenced were held; in the subsequent rioting 74 people were killed, including two police officers, and over 500 were injured.

=== Equatorial Guinea ===
At the 2015 Africa Cup of Nations, at the semi-finals between the host country Equatorial Guinea and Ghana, hooligans invaded the pitch and threw bottles and missiles at the Ghana players.

=== Gambia ===
Massive riots occurred during and after a Cup of African Nations qualifying game between rival neighbours Senegal and Gambia at the Leopold Sedar Senghor Stadium in Dakar, Senegal in June 2003. Gambian supporters hurled missiles towards Senegalese fans and were subsequently charged by soldiers. After the game, violent clashes were reported in both Gambia and Senegal. In Gambia several severe beatings of Senegalese citizens occurred, which led to over 200 Senegalese seeking shelter at their embassy. In Senegal a Gambian BBC reporter was attacked and robbed by a group of youths. The riots eventually led to the closing of the border between Gambia and Senegal until order was restored.

=== Ghana ===
Up to 125 people died and hundreds were injured when football fans stampeded at a match in Accra in 2001. Accra Hearts were leading 2–1 against Asante Kotoko with five minutes left in the match when some fans began throwing bottles and chairs onto the pitch. Police then fired tear gas into the crowd, sparking a panic. Fans rushed to escape the gas, and in the ensuing crush, up to 125 people were killed.

Asante Kotoko faced a ban after fans assaulted the referee in a CAF Confederation Cup game against Étoile Sportive du Sahel of Tunisia.

=== Guinea ===
On December 1, 2024, clashes between football fans in N'Zerekore, Guinea, led to at least 56 deaths after a controversial refereeing decision sparked unrest. Police used tear gas in response, and hospital sources suggested the death toll could exceed 100. Following the violence, demonstrators vandalized a police station. The match was part of a tournament honoring military leader Mamady Doumbouya.

=== Ivory Coast ===
Fighting among fans at a match on 6 May 2001 led to one death and 39 injuries.

=== Kenya ===
In Kenya, the most hotly contested rivalry is the Nairobi derby famouly known as "Mashemeji Derby" between A.F.C. Leopards and Gor Mahia, both of whose fans are regularly associated with hooliganism. On 18 March 2012, a derby match was held up for over 26 minutes when a riot broke out, leading to destruction of property and several injuries, after Gor Mahia midfielder Ali Abondo was shown a red card for a dangerous tackle on Leopards' defender Amon Muchiri. Gor Mahia were banned by the Sports Stadia Management Board from playing in their facilities for the rest of the 2012 season, meaning that the club would not be able to play in either the Nyayo National Stadium or the Moi International Sports Centre. The KPL Board has yet to announce further disciplinary measures on the club.

=== Libya ===
Eight fans died and 39 were injured when troops opened fire to stop both pro- and anti-Muammar al-Gaddafi sentiments being expressed in a Tripoli stadium during a match between Al Ahli and Al Ittihad in December 1996.

=== Mali ===
After a World Cup qualifying match between Mali and Togo on 27 March 2005, which Togo won 2–1, Mali fans rioted and went on a spree of destruction and violence. The trouble started when Togo scored the winning goal. Police fired tear gas at Mali fans who had invaded the pitch. The match was abandoned and the win awarded to Togo. The result set off a wave of violence in the capital of Mali, Bamako. Thousands of Mali fans in Bamako began chanting threats toward the Mali players, cars were set on fire, stores looted, property and monuments destroyed and a building housing the local Olympics committee was burned down.

=== Mauritius ===
In May 1999, seven people died when rioting football fans threw petrol bombs into a casino, following a match in Port Louis between the Mauritian League champions, Scouts Club, and Fire Brigade SC. The incident became knowns as L'affaire L'Amicale. After the match which Fire Brigade SC won, hundreds of Scouts fans went on a rampage, attacking police vehicles and torching sugar cane fields.

=== Mozambique ===
The government of Mozambique apologised for the violent behaviour of Mozambique fans, before, during and after a match between Mozambican club Clube Ferroviário de Maputo and Zimbabwean club Dynamos on 10 May 1998. Ferroviário fans attacked the Dynamo players and the referee, stoned vehicles and fought running battles with riot police outside the stadium. Fifteen people, including four Red Cross workers, needed hospital treatment.

=== South Africa ===
In Johannesburg, South Africa, on 14 January 1991, forty people died when fans surged toward a jammed exit to escape rival brawling fans at a match southwest of Johannesburg.

On 11 February 2017, a match between Mamelodi Sundowns F.C. and Orlando Pirates F.C. at Loftus Versfeld Stadium was suspended for nearly an hour when Pirates supporters invaded the pitch and clashed with Sundowns fans after Sundowns scored their sixth goal.

These acts led to the loss of net asset value compared to "book value" – or impairment – of various assets of the stadium, in terms of the requirements of IAS 36.

=== Zimbabwe ===
In July 2000 twelve people died following a stampede at a World Cup qualifying match between Zimbabwe and South Africa in Harare. Police fired tear gas when the crowd started throwing missiles onto the pitch, after South Africa had taken a two-goal lead. After Delron Buckley scored South Africa's second goal bottles began to fly onto the pitch. The police then fired tear gas into the 60,000-person crowd, who began running to the exits to escape the effects of the tear gas. The match had to be abandoned as players from both sides felt the effects of the tear gas and had to receive medical treatment. The police were condemned for firing tear gas. In July 2002, two fans were shot when police opened fire on rioting fans at a match in Bulawayo. Seven police officers were injured and five vehicles badly damaged.

== Oceania ==
=== Australia ===
The incident with the most notoriety in Australia is the Pratten Park riot in 1985 where hundreds of fans stormed the pitch midway through a Sydney Olympic v Sydney City match. In a match between Melbourne Heart and Melbourne Victory in February 2013, 17 plastic seats were destroyed and flares were fired. In a match between Sydney FC and Melbourne Victory in November 2013, one travelling Melbourne Victory fan was hospitalised with a stab wound by a sixteen-year-old civilian. In December 2013, a riot between Melbourne Victory and Western Sydney Wanderers broke out at a pub before the match later that day. At an international football friendly between Australia and Serbia in Melbourne in June 2011, fans lit flares both inside and outside the stadium, and in city streets. Banners supporting Ratko Mladić, the Serbian military leader charged with war crimes by the International Court of Justice, were displayed, and a laser pointer was seen in use. In February 2011, Victoria Police said they were reluctant to cover Melbourne Victory games because of unacceptable behaviour by fans. Problems included violence, anti-social behaviour and the lighting of flares.

Although the A-League is relatively young, there are hooligan and casual groups within clubs' active supporter bases. Although it is nothing like football hooliganism in Europe, anti-social events do occasionally occur. A primary example would be the Bourke Street brawl between Melbourne Victory and Western Sydney Wanderers fans, who gathered in numbers before a match in late 2013 and had a brawl in Melbourne, causing concern among football authorities in Australia. There are small hooligan and casual groups in Australia, the most prominent being from the League's biggest fanbases, Melbourne Victory, Sydney FC and Western Sydney Wanderers though others exist within other supporter groups.

In 2021, police arrested three men for participating in a riot at a National Premier League soccer match in Sydney.

During a match between Melbourne City FC and Melbourne Victory FC in December 2022, Victory fans stormed the pitch after City goalkeeper Tom Glover accidentally threw a flare into the crowd, after multiple flares were thrown onto the pitch, stopping the game and injuring a camera operator. It came during a pre-planned walkout, as supporters from multiple clubs at the time were protesting the Australian Professional Leagues decision to sell hosting rights of the league's grand final to Sydney. Angered spectators proceeded to rush onto the field, mobbing Glover and referee Alex King. In the midst of the invasion, a metal bucket for disposing of used flares was thrown at Glover's head, gashing his face and concussing him. Both teams immediately left the field of play and police dispersed the unruly mob, and the match was abandoned.

=== Fiji ===
Football hooliganism was banned by the Fiji Football Association in 2020 following two reports of hooliganism at Premier League football matches. The first incident occurred when a Rewa FC player allegedly assaulted a referee in a play-off match against Ba FC. The second incident occurred in Nadi at a match between Nadi FC and Rewa FC, where a group of Nadi fans threatened the referee.

=== New Zealand ===
In 2023, at a Palmerston North United home match against Gisborne Thistle in the Central Federation League, which Palmerston North United lost 4–2, Palmerston North United midfielder Devon Batchelor was physically assaulted by an opposition player and was taken to hospital. Batchelor was diagnosed with a concussion and required stitches. Football New Zealand condemned the incident.

=== Papua New Guinea ===
An incident of soccer hooliganism occurred at PNG Football Stadium in Port Moresby in 2023 after a National Soccer League (PNGNSL) semi-final between Gulf Komara and Hekari United. The match resulted in a 2–0 victory for Hekari United, which led fans to storm the pitch.

In 2017, police were called to a national team (Kapuls) training session after people connected with a fake rebel soccer organisation (dubbed by the media as the "Fake Football Federation") interrupted the training session, which was to prepare for a FIFA World Cup qualifier against the Solomon Islands.

=== Solomon Islands ===
In 2005, a youth national team match at Lawson Tama Stadium in Honiara between Australia (the "Young Socceroos") and the Solomon Islands was abandoned in the 77th minute by New Zealand referee Peter O'Leary due to hooliganism from "several thousand" fans who failed to gain entry (local officials reported that 22,000 spectators were at the match). Australia was winning the match 3–0 until the match was called off.

== Media portrayal ==
The portrayal of hooliganism is widespread in the media. For example, episode 2: "Seeing Red" of Beckham showed a dummy of David Beckham being hung by a noose outside an English pub following his red card against Argentina in the 1998 World Cup.

Football hooliganism has been depicted in films such as The Firm, ID, EuroTrip, Cass, The Football Factory, Green Street, Rise of the Footsoldier and Awaydays. There are also many books about hooliganism, such as The Football Factory and Among the Thugs.

The classic quote “Football is a gentleman’s game played by hooligans, and Rugby is a hooligans’ game played by gentlemen,” was originally made by a Cambridge University Chancellor in the 1890s as “It is clear that one is a gentleman’s game played by hooligans; the other a hooligan’s game played by gentlemen.”

== See also ==
- Association football culture
- Australian rules football culture
- How Soccer Explains the World
- Millwall brick
- Sports riot
