= Los Borrachos del Tablón =

Argentine football barra brava

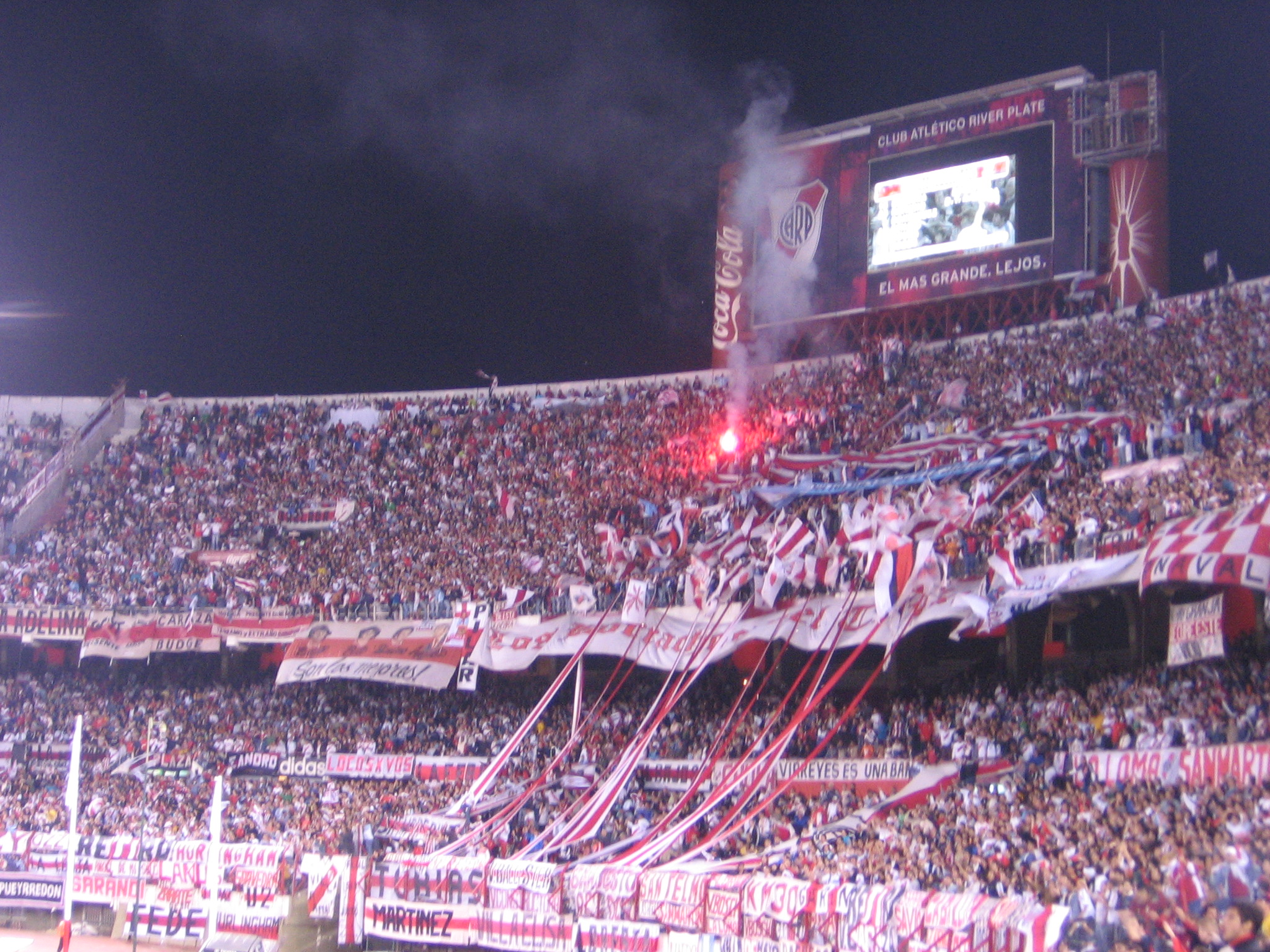
- Los Borrachos del Tablón in 2006.
- Abbreviation: LBDT
- Founded: 1975
- Type: Supporters' group
- Club: Club Atlético River Plate
- Location: Buenos Aires, Argentina
- Arena: Monumental
- Stand: Sívori Lower Stand (at home)
- Leader: Mauro Ferreras (alias Sub Zero)
- Co-leader: Leandro Ferreras
- Membership: Unknown
- Colors

Los Borrachos del Tablón (LBDT, lit. 'Drunkards of the Bleachers') is the barra brava of the Club Atlético River Plate located in the Estadio Monumental of Buenos Aires, Argentina. It is one of the largest and most powerful barra brava groups of the Argentine football.

== History ==
=== Beginnings ===
Under the leadership of Luisito Pereyra and Edgar "Diariero" ("Newspaper Man") Butassi, the barra brava was involved in fights and controversies. However, the intensity of involvement in crime and fighting did not compare to today. In 1996 after a River Plate game against Club Atlético Independiente a battle against the fans of Independiente (not the barra brava) would set the beginning of the end for Pereyra and Butassi's hold on the organization. The battle ended with the death of Christian Rousoulis, an Independiente fan stabbed by members of Los Borrachos. This caused tense internal problems that split the firm in two, leaving both bosses Luisito and El Diariero powerless. Later on, they would face charges related to the Rousoulis case.

=== The rise of the "patovicas" ===
The two sections of the firm were now under the leadership of new faces. One of the groups, led by bosses "El Zapatero" and "El Monito" Saldivia, had their base in the Constitución neighborhood. It was rumored that they were tied to the political Partido Justicialista. "Los Patovicas," the other group of the firm, was led by two close friends who were on the third lines of the firm prior to 1997. These two were middle class men Adrian Rousseau and Alan Schlenker, who lived in the upper-class neighborhood of Belgrano. In 2002, before a River Plate-Newell's Old Boys game, Los Patovicas confronted the Newell's barra brava right outside the stadium, in order to show their power and to intimidate the group led by El Zapatero and El Monito. As the section's numbers began to increase, all other factions of the firm had no choice but to join Schlenker and Rousseau's side. As president of the Club Jose Maria Aguilar was finishing his first year as head of River, Los Patovicas became the head of Los Borrachos as they cleaned up the section and sent messages to all those with 'bad intentions.' Nazareno, one of the members, was beaten up as an example because he was stealing from fans in the stadium. Later on the band of Fuerte Apache led by Martin Stambuli also joined "Los Patovicas". Fuerte Apache is one of the most dangerous neighborhoods in the Greater Buenos Aires.

=== Becoming one of the most feared ===
With significant support from board members and outstanding organization, Los Borrachos became the most feared and well-respected barra brava in Argentina. Other barras bravas admitted this fact and refused to confront Los Borrachos. Transportation, sales, services, stolen flags from other barras bravas, and weapons were evidence of the power of this barra brava. In 2003, La 12, which is Boca Juniors (River's eternal rival) barra brava, avoided a scheduled battle with Los Borrachos, a move that placed much more respect on River's side. In a 2002 summer Superclasico (vs Boca Juniors), Boca was up 4-0 in the first half. As Boca's barra brava and fans began making fun of River, Los Borrachos were able to break the hurdles dividing them from the Boca Juniors fans (La 12), injuring many of them. The following year, while driving up to Rosario to watch their side play Rosario Central, Los Borrachos confronted a bus of Newell's firm (one of the big rival firms) on Highway 9, in a battle that killed two Newell's fans. To this day, some members of Los Borrachos still face charges because of the deaths. One of the members, close to William Schlenker (brother of Alan), also faced charges because he beat up a university student who was wearing Rosario Central shorts in a restaurant in the Belgrano neighborhood. Apparently the university student was told by the defendant to take the shorts off in that neighborhood, and he responded "C'mon I can't take off my shorts in front of everyone." Another encounter took place in the Copa Libertadores match up against Brazil's Corinthians. The firm beat up police outside the Stadium in Brazil.

=== 2006 FIFA World Cup ===
During the 2006 World Cup, the power of Los Borrachos was at its peak. They had great relationships with the players, were in a great financial position (earnings of $ 70,000 a month), and had the support of board members. While other barras bravas, such as Boca's and Independiente's, had to stay in places like the Czech Republic and Poland because of expenses, Los Borrachos were able to stay in Munich and some say that the top leaders stayed in the house of Martin Demichelis. During the games they did not use their assigned seating, causing FIFA to suspend them from any other games during the World Cup. The firm hired top German lawyers and eventually were able to overturn FIFA's decision. They returned from Germany with full pockets and many believe that arrogance was the start of their decline. When they came back from Germany, the firm went to Paraguay to see the Libertad vs River Plate match, for the Copa Libertadores de America. River down 3-1 in the second half, and Los Borrachos began fighting the police. During the fight Los Borrachos were wearing River Plate jerseys and were recorded on tape. Paraguay's justice pressed charges against the firm's top bosses.

=== The murder of Gonzalo Acro ===
Leaders Adrian Rousseau and Alan Schlenker started having their differences, to the point where the firm split. After the falling out between the two leaders, there were serious fights between groups loyal to the different leaders. The most serious one occurred on February 11, 2007, in what has been dubbed "The Battle of the Mud Huts," since it happened on that recreational section of the Estadio Monumental Antonio Vespucio Liberti, which caused Argentine courts to close the stadium for three games. On May 6, 2007, the two groups fought again, this time just outside the stadium after a game, with two people suffering serious knife-wounds, and many others lesser injuries. Later on, they fought again but this time in the parking lot of a Wal-Mart. The night of August 7, Gonzalo Acro (Rosseau's right-hand man) was shot three times as he was coming home from the gym. Acro died a day later. Immediately after his death, relatives and Rosseau came out to the media, claiming Acro was not involved in the power struggle. Media and even members close to Rosseau came out saying that Acro was in fact Rosseau's right-hand man all along and, to prove his lack of innocence in the issue, pointed to him as the one that stabbed the wheels of the players' vehicles two years earlier, in a game that River lost 3-1 to Racing Club. Schlenker's side was immediately blamed and accused of the murder; however, they denied everything. Schlenker was on the run immediately after the incident as apparently he was hiding in Cordoba. Most of the members of the firm are currently under custody, however none of them was found guilty yet. In 2009, "El Colo" Luna, who was hiding in Barcelona and Italy, admitted to the murder through a video saying it was an accidental shot that left the gun. He was later found by Italian police and arrested. However, investigators doubt that he was the murderer, and everything points to either William or Alan Schlenker as the murderers.

== See also ==
- Club Atlético River Plate
- Football hooliganism
