= UEFA Euro 2016 riots =

Series of football riots in France

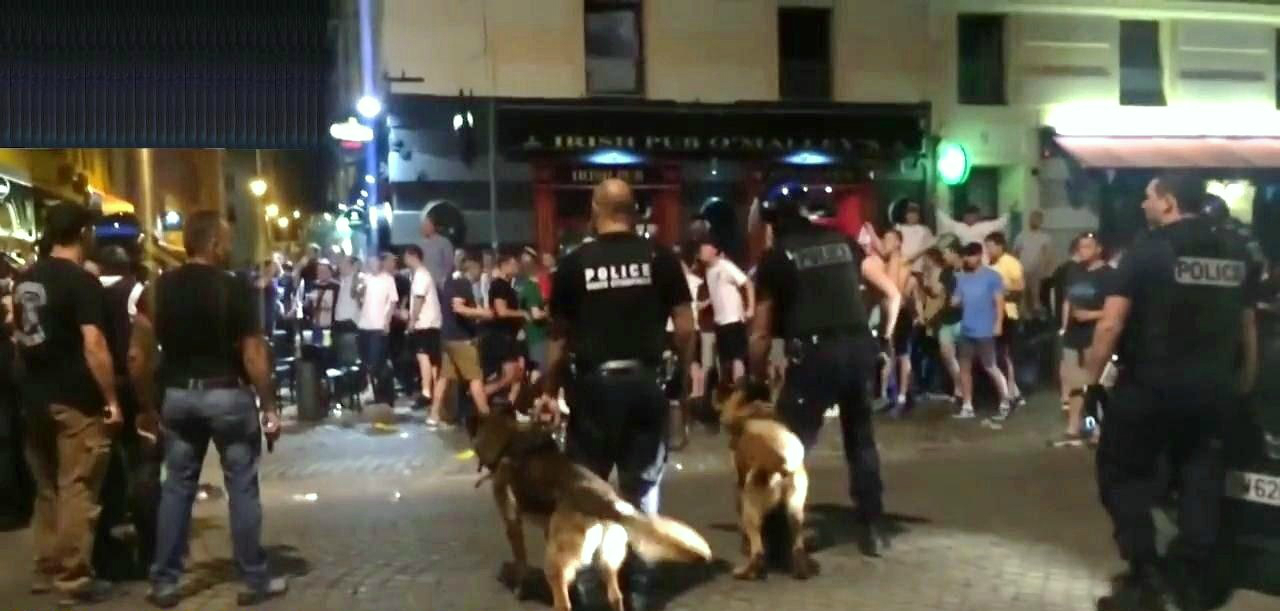
News coverage of riots in Marseille during UEFA Euro 2016

The UEFA Euro 2016 football championships in France saw several recorded instances of football hooliganism and related violence between fans, both at the venues where matches took place, and in cities near the participating stadiums. The violence started immediately before the tournament began, and involved clashes between several countries. Some of the rioting came from established gangs and football hooligan organisations, which deliberately intended to provoke violence. They clashed with riot police who controlled the crowds using tear gas and a water cannon.

Both the organisers and government officials in several countries condemned all violence, and recommended various sanctions up to and including removal from the tournament and a ban on alcohol. Russian politicians later said the country had been singled out for unfair treatment and protested against a suspended disqualification.

== Events ==
=== Marseille ===
On 10 June, English fans at Marseille clashed with police, who used tear gas to break up the crowd. One fan and one local man were arrested. Fans later complained that the police were unnecessarily confrontational, and provoked further problems. Six English fans were later arrested and charged with throwing bottles at the police or other fans. One English fan was hospitalised, while dozens of other fans were injured in the clashes. England striker Jamie Vardy's wife Rebekah was hit by tear gas during the disruption. The first two England fans tried for throwing bottles at police were each given a three-month prison sentence and a two-year ban from France.

The next day, English and Russian fans clashed before that evening's game between the two teams. The police again used tear gas and a water cannon to control crowds. Immediately after the match, which ended in a 1–1 draw, around 150 Russian fans at the Stade Vélodrome charged towards England supporters in a neighbouring terrace. Russian fans set off flares and climbed over fencing to attack the opposing supporters. Two Russian supporters were also arrested over a pitch invasion during the game. Video footage showed Russian hooligans attacking English fans with chairs and metal bars. The chief prosecutor in Marseille called the group "hyper-rapid and hyper-violent".

A week later at the Stade Vélodrome, before the match between Iceland and Hungary, Hungarian fans clashed with stewards. A report in The Guardian said some supporters tried to climb a fence and a flare was thrown, but otherwise the match was peaceful.

=== Lille ===
The whole thing is a disaster waiting to happen. It's like a massive tinder box waiting to go off any minute

— Fan response to the atmosphere at Euro 2016

German and Ukrainian fans clashed in Lille before their group stage game on 12 June, with further violence and street battles. UEFA later said they had "serious concerns" over security in the city. An additional 4,000 police were drafted in, in preparation for matches featuring Russia and England (the latter in nearby Lens).

Russian and English fans clashed again on 15 June, requiring the police to use tear gas to break up crowds following Russia's game against Slovakia in the Stade Pierre-Mauroy. French riot police used tear gas and charged at hundreds of England fans, as flares were set off. Fans were herded by riot police away from the main square, and the atmosphere calmed. A minor scuffle between English and Russian fans broke out in the city centre around midnight. At least 36 people were arrested following brawling between England and Russia fans; a total of 16 people were hospitalised.

=== Nice ===
On 12 June, violence broke out between French hooligans and Northern Irish supporters, who had been drinking amicably with their Polish counterparts in Nice, ahead of a match of Northern Ireland against Poland. News reports later showed the attack had been provoked by the local French hooligans. Six Northern Irish and a Polish supporter were injured, one of them seriously.

Several Spanish fans, wearing neo-Nazi insignia, were arrested for robbery with violence before the Spain–Turkey group match at the Allianz Riviera on 17 June.

=== Paris ===
Before the Croatia versus Turkey match on 12 June, members of Kop of Boulogne (PSG group) attacked groups of Turkish supporters. During the match itself at Parc des Princes, KoB fans were seen holding banners "Turkish fans are not welcome".

In the hours before the 10 July final between Portugal and France at the Stade de France in Saint-Denis, there were clashes between fans trying to access the Eiffel Tower fan zone and police who were attempting to prevent overcrowding. Police carried out a controlled explosion on a package left outside the stadium complex, while fans set litter bins alight. The disruption was under control by the second half of the match, but after Portugal beat France 1–0, fights broke out between fans outside the stadium. Police advised people not to travel to the Eiffel Tower or the Champs-Élysées as the area was not safe.

=== Cologne ===
On the evening of 16 June, Russian hooligans attacked three Spanish tourists in the German city of Cologne. The attack was apparently sparked when the Spaniards, two men and one woman, put stickers with anti-fascist slogans on a lamppost. According to the police, the group of Russians were members of a right-wing group. In their possession authorities found tickets to the Euro 2016 games of the Russian team against England and Slovakia as well as disguises such as masks. Six attackers were detained, five of them immediately after the attack and one at the airport.

=== Saint-Étienne ===
These are not Croatian fans, they are terrorists. What hurts me is that the state does not want to deal with that. This is a terrorist act. I hope that they will identify them and they will end up where they belong

— Croatian coach Ante Čačić's reaction to the incident.

During the match between the Czech Republic and Croatia on 17 June in Saint-Étienne, Croatian hooligans threw flares onto the Stade Geoffroy-Guichard pitch, causing referee Mark Clattenburg to halt the match just before its end, and fans fought among themselves. A steward was struck by a firecracker after a Croatian fan threw it onto the field and striker Ivan Perišić was nearly struck by a flare. A total of eight flares, as well as other objects, were thrown into the field. The team unsuccessfully tried to calm the crowd and Clattenburg moved every player into the center of the field to avoid injury.

Prior to the start of the game, the Croatian Helsinki Committee warned the French authorities and organizers to enforce additional safety measures, as 300 members of Torcida Split (ultras supporters of HNK Hajduk Split) were entering the city. One group was stopped by police at the Croatian border after masks and drugs were discovered. Croatian news sources reported that before the start of the match, the Torcida has broadcast images via social media of the stadium and the planned disruption along the groups Bad Blue Boys, Armada Rijeka and Ultrasi. The groups wanted to revolt against the Croatian Football Federation (HNS) and publicly embarrass the country.

HNS President Davor Šuker confirmed the reports of riots. The HNS Commissioners for Safety declared that they collaborated with Croatian and French police, as well as UEFA, in providing information that disorder would occur in the 85th minute of the game. As a result, French police entered the stadium two minutes earlier. It was reported that the incident was planned and conducted by extreme ultras from Torcida Split, who have good relations with fans of AS Saint-Étienne.

=== Lyon ===
During the match between Albania and Romania at the Parc Olympique Lyonnais in Lyon on 19 June, crowd trouble was attributed to fans from both countries. Supporters let off smoke bombs, hurled objects and invaded the pitch. According to French prosecutors, one Albanian man hid a flare inside his rectum to smuggle it into the stadium.

== Reactions ==
=== UEFA ===
Both the English and Russian national teams were threatened with disqualification by the competition organiser UEFA if violence by their supporters continued. On 14 June, the Russian team were given a suspended disqualification and the country's national federation was fined €150,000 with a strict warning that the team would be removed from the tournament if any further violence occurred. Fifty Russian fans were deported. The sentence could only relate to events inside the stadium, as that is all UEFA is responsible for. England was also warned about disqualification, but were not formally charged.

Croatia and Turkey were charged for stadium trouble, after their group stage match with Czech Republic and Spain respectively. The Hungarian, Belgian and Portuguese football federations were also charged on 19 June for fans disturbances during matches against Iceland, Republic of Ireland and Austria. Albania and Romania were both charged by UEFA after their match, to bring the total number of countries indicted over stadium crowd trouble to eight – a third of those competing at the tournament. Croatia and Hungary were fined €100,000 and €65,000 respectively.

=== France ===
French Minister of the Interior, Bernard Cazeneuve, asked all participating cities in the tournament to ban the sale of alcohol on both match days and the day before them. He also recommended a ban on selling any containers that could be used as missiles. There were later complaints that since the ban did not cover off-licence sale of drinks, it was de facto unenforceable.

The French police identified a gang of 150 well-trained Russian football hooligans causing the violence and disorder. On 18 June, it was announced that the far-right leader of the Russian football supporters' association Alexander Shprygin, who had arrived with Russia's official delegation, was to be deported from France together with 19 fellow fans. After being sent back to Russia, he was re-arrested in Toulouse at Russia's match against Wales.

=== Russia ===
Russian coach Leonid Slutsky did not challenge the disqualification or fine, saying he was confident that no further violence would occur. Igor Lebedev, MP from the far-right Liberal Democratic Party of Russia, is reported to have said: "I don't see anything terrible about fans fighting ... Keep it up!", laying blame at the lack of organisation and policing instead of the fans. Vladimir Markin, spokesman for the Investigative Committee of Russia, said, "The Europeans are surprised when they see a real man looking like a man should". Russian President Vladimir Putin condemned the violence and disagreed strongly with some reports showing Russian officials appearing to support it.

In response to the sanctions levelled against Russia, the French ambassador was summoned to the Russian foreign ministry to answer questions about the treatment of Russian supporters. Russian Foreign Minister Sergey Lavrov strongly criticised the police over the deportation orders, particularly an incident where fans were ordered to leave a bus for identity checks. He believed such an action violated the rules of the Vienna Convention.

=== England ===
The British Shadow Home Secretary, Andy Burnham, condemned the violence, claiming most had been "let down by a minority". In a press conference before their match against Wales, England manager Roy Hodgson and captain Wayne Rooney made a request to fans to "stay out of trouble", reiterating the Football Association's official stance.

=== Croatia ===
Croatian President Kolinda Grabar-Kitarović requested a government session after the match between Croatia and the Czech Republic to discuss fan trouble. The Croatian Football Federation apologised for the behaviour of their fans in the stadium. After reporting that some hooligans who participated in the disruption were from Serbia and Bosnia and Herzegovina, Croatian daily newspaper Slobodna Dalmacija speculated on whose authority they had acted.

== Media reports ==
Seven Russian media outlets, including RIA Novosti, quoted statements by fake Twitter journalists as evidence of English fans "provoking" Russian supporters. Swiss journalist Jürg Vollmer believes that the accounts are run by a Russian troll factory.

A BBC report described some of the Russian fans involved in the violence as emulating English football hooliganism of the 1970s and 1980s. It claimed they considered themselves athletes, and were generally fitter than English counterparts. According to CBC News, they were "almost embraced by the state". An article published by The Daily Telegraph described their actions as "state-endorsed hooliganism" and said that reports on Russian state television "bordered on the triumphant".
