= 2012 in Kenyan football =

Football in Kenya
- Season: 2012

Men's football
- Premier League: Tusker
- Division One: Bandari (Zone A); Kakamega Homeboyz (Zone B)
- President's Cup: Gor Mahia
- Top 8 Cup: Gor Mahia
- Super Cup: Tusker

Women's football
- Premier League: Matuu

The following article is a summary of the 2012 football season in Kenya, which was the 49th competitive season in its history.

== Domestic leagues ==
=== Promotion and relegation ===
Promoted to Premier League

- Muhoroni Youth
- Oserian

Promoted to Division One

- Coast United
- G.F.C. 105
- Green Berets
- Kakamega Homeboyz
- West Kenya Sugar (promoted as Kabrass United)
- Zoo Kericho

Relegated from Premier League

- Bandari
- Congo JMJ United

Relegated from Division One

- Annex 07
- Kiambaa United
- Makarios
- Nanyuki
- Opera
- Real Kisumu
- Strathmore University

=== Managerial changes ===
==== Premier League ====
As of September 24, 2012.

Team	Outgoing	Reason	Date of vacancy	Incoming	Date of appointment	Table position
Gor Mahia	(Kenya) Zedekiah Otieno	End of contract	December 2011	(Cameroon) Anaba Awono	17 December 2011	End of 2011 season
Gor Mahia	(Cameroon) Anaba Awono	Sacked	5 March 2012	(Kenya) John Bobby Ogolla	7 March 2012	N/A
Gor Mahia	(Kenya) John Bobby Ogolla	Demoted	March 2012	(Croatia) Zdravko Logarusić	March 2012	N/A
Mathare United	(Kenya) Gabriel Njoroge	Resigned	March 2012	(Kenya) Stanley Okumbi	March 2012	N/A
Muhoroni Youth	(Kenya) Alfred Imonje	Suspended	April 2012 (then resigned)	Reinstated	May 2012	12th
Nairobi City Stars	(Kenya) Gideon Ochieng	Resigned	December 2011	Reinstated	December 2011	End of 2011 season
Oserian	(Kenya) Sammy Otinga	Resigned	June 2012	(Kenya) Gilbert Selebwa	June 2012	16th
Oserian	(Kenya) Gilbert Selebwa	Back to TD	18 August 2012	(Kenya) Sammy Omollo	20 August 2012	16th
Rangers	(Kenya) David Ouma	Sacked	December 2011	(Kenya) Ezekiel Akwana	January 2012	End of 2011 season
Rangers	(Kenya) Ezekiel Akwana	Resigned	April 2012	(Kenya) Jaffer Gichuki	April 2012	N/A
Rangers	(Kenya) Jaffer Gichuki	Resigned	June 2012	(Kenya) James Nandwa	22 June 2012	15th
Sofapaka	(Kenya) Salim Ali	Sacked	21 August 2012	(England) Stewart Hall	12 September 2012	3rd
Sony Sugar	(Kenya) Francis Baraza	Sacked	January 2012	(Kenya) Zedekiah Otieno	January 2012	End of 2011 season
Tusker	(Kenya) Sammy Omollo	Sacked	15 August 2012	(Kenya) Robert Matano	24 August 2012	2nd
Ulinzi Stars	(Kenya) Benjamin Nyangweso	Sacked	March 2012	(Kenya) Sammy Simiyu	1 April 2012	N/A

==== Division One ====
As of July 22, 2012.

Zone A
Team	Outgoing manager	Manner of departure	Date of vacancy	Position in table	Incoming manager	Date of appointment
Gatundu Stars	(Kenya) Shadrack Ateka	Resigned	June 2012	12th	Reinstated	July 2012
Ligi Ndogo	(Democratic Republic of the Congo) Ibrahim Mbikalo	Sent to coach U16 team	18 April 2012	5th	(Kenya) Mike Kamure	13 May 2012
Mahakama	(Kenya) Peter Ambetsa	Sacked	July 2012	4th	(Kenya) Ezekiel Akwana	9 July 2012

Zone B
Team	Outgoing manager	Manner of departure	Date of vacancy	Position in table	Incoming manager	Date of appointment
Karungu	(Kenya) Bernard Kizito	Sacked	N/A		(Kenya) Henry Adero	24 May 2012
West Kenya Sugar	N/A				(Kenya) Nick Yakhama	5 July 2012

=== Premier League ===
The 2012 Kenyan Premier League began on February 11, 2012, and ended on November 10, 2012, with a break that lasted from May 20, 2012, to June 23, 2012.

On 21 August, the Kenyan Premier League and East African Breweries signed a KSh.170 million/= (US$2.02 million; £1.28 million sterling; €1.62 million) deal for the renaming of the league to the Tusker Premier League, making it the most lucrative deal in Kenyan football history. On 18 October, Puma signed a deal with the league for KSh.10 million/= (US$117,275; £73,242 stg.; €90,052) to make them the official ball supplier for the league and its clubs with immediate effect.

Pos	Team	Pld	W	D	L	GF	GA	GD	Pts	Qualification or relegation
1	Tusker (C, Q)	30	17	9	4	39	14	+25	60	Qualification for 2013 CAF Champions League
2	Gor Mahia (Q)	30	17	8	5	37	18	+19	59	Qualification for 2013 CAF Confederation Cup (Note: Gor Mahia qualified for the 2013 CAF Confederation Cup as winners of the 2012 FKF President's Cup.)
3	A.F.C. Leopards	30	17	6	7	45	27	+18	57	
4	Sofapaka	30	13	9	8	34	24	+10	48	
5	Thika United	30	12	10	8	36	33	+3	46	
6	Ulinzi Stars	30	13	6	11	35	29	+6	45	
7	Chemelil Sugar	30	9	14	7	18	17	+1	41	
8	Mathare United	30	10	11	9	36	36	0	41	
9	Western Stima	30	11	7	12	27	25	+2	40	
10	Kenya Commercial Bank	30	11	6	13	35	31	+4	39	
11	Sony Sugar	30	11	5	14	26	26	0	38	
12	Karuturi Sports	30	7	11	12	18	26	−8	32	
13	Nairobi City Stars	30	6	11	13	16	32	−16	29	
14	Muhoroni Youth	30	7	6	17	19	34	−15	27	
15	Oserian (R)	30	5	9	16	15	33	−18	24	Relegation to 2013 FKF Division One
16	Rangers (R)	30	4	12	14	22	53	−31	24	Relegation to 2013 FKF Division One

Updated to match(es) played on 10 November 2012. Source: Kenyan Premier League
Rules for classification: 1) points; 2) goal difference; 3) number of goals scored.
(C) Champions; (Q) Qualified for the phase indicated; (R) Relegated

=== Women's Premier League ===
The 2012 Kenyan Women's Premier League began on March 3, 2012, and ended on October 7, 2012.

Relegated Sotik Super Stars had been highlighted as an incompetent team after losing 14−0 to three different teams: MOYAS Ladies, Mathare United and Matuu.

Pos	Team	Pld	W	D	L	GF	GA	GD	Pts	Qualification or relegation
1	Matuu (C)	22	19	1	2	99	22	+77	58	
2	MOYAS Ladies	22	19	0	3	78	17	+61	57	
3	Old Is Gold	22	17	2	3	81	22	+59	53	
4	Kisii United	22	12	2	8	54	26	+28	38	
5	Spedag	22	12	2	8	37	32	+5	38	
6	Mathare United	22	11	2	9	55	24	+31	35	
7	Thika Queens	22	9	6	7	39	31	+8	33	
8	Western Commando	22	9	1	12	38	49	−11	28	
9	Galactico Youth	22	3	7	12	20	48	−28	16	
10	Makolanders	22	4	4	14	26	59	−33	16	
11	Kamaliza Eaglets (R)	22	1	2	19	13	86	−73	5	Relegation to 2013 FKF Women's Division One
12	Sotik Super Stars (R)	22	1	1	20	8	132	−124	4	Relegation to 2013 FKF Women's Division One

Updated to match(es) played on 7 October 2012. Source: FKF Girls' Premier League
Rules for classification: 1) points; 2) goal difference; 3) number of goals scored.
(C) Champions; (R) Relegated

=== Division One ===
The Nationwide League had its name changed to FKF Division One at the beginning of the season.

The 2012 FKF Division One season began on March 3, 2012, and ended on November 18, 2012, in both Zone A and B.

==== Zone A ====
On 31 August 2012, Mathare Youth disbanded and therefore pulled out of the league, after which the FKF decided to scrap all of their second round results. This meant that all teams that had played against Mathare Youth had their points revoked or given back, depending on the results of the matches, and all upcoming fixtures involving Mathare Youth were cancelled.

Pos	Team	Pld	W	D	L	GF	GA	GD	Pts	Qualification or relegation
1	Bandari (C, P)	37	24	10	3	62	18	+44	82	Promotion to 2013 Kenyan Premier League
2	Bidco United	37	19	14	4	49	27	+22	71	
3	Admiral	37	19	12	6	68	46	+22	69	
4	Mahakama	37	19	11	7	52	23	+29	68	
5	Administration Police	37	18	9	10	56	34	+22	63	
6	Ligi Ndogo	37	15	15	7	47	28	+19	60	
7	Kariobangi Sharks	37	16	9	12	51	42	+9	57	
8	Nairobi Stima	37	13	14	10	46	39	+7	53	
9	MOYAS	37	14	9	14	41	37	+4	51	
10	Kenya Revenue Authority	37	13	11	13	35	35	0	50	
11	Congo JMJ United	37	13	11	13	45	47	−2	50	
12	Coast United	37	12	9	16	41	52	−11	44 (Note: Coast United had 1 point deducted from their tally for willingly deciding not to turn up for their match against Sparki Youth on 1 May.)	
13	Green Berets	37	11	9	17	44	49	−5	42	
14	Kibera Celtic	37	9	12	16	29	51	−22	39	
15	Magongo Rangers	37	9	9	19	33	53	−20	36	
16	Sparki Youth (R)	37	11	7	19	39	51	−12	33 (Note: Sparki Youth had 1 point deducted from their tally for willingly deciding not to turn up for their match against Coast United on 1 May and 6 points deducted from their tally for involvement in an assault on the referee of their match against Admiral on 22 September.)	Relegation to 2013 Kenyan Provincial League
17	KSL Thola Glass (R)	37	8	8	21	30	60	−30	32	Relegation to 2013 Kenyan Provincial League
18	Gatundu Stars (R)	37	8	7	22	34	64	−30	31	Relegation to 2013 Kenyan Provincial League
19	Iron Strikers (R)	37	7	10	20	43	74	−31	31	Relegation to 2013 Kenyan Provincial League
20	Mathare Youth (E)	19	3	4	12	11	26	−15	13	Pulled out of league (Note: Mathare Youth disbanded and therefore pulled out of the league, after which the Football Kenya Federation decided to nullify all their second round results and cancel their upcoming fixtures. As a result, the FKF ruled that there were 19 teams left in the league, therefore the 16th-placed team would also be relegated.)

Updated to match(es) played on 18 November 2012. Source: FKF Division One, Zone A
Rules for classification: 1) points; 2) goal difference; 3) number of goals scored.
(C) Champions; (E) Eliminated; (P) Promoted; (R) Relegated

==== Zone B ====
Pos	Team	Pld	W	D	L	GF	GA	GD	Pts	Qualification or relegation
1	Kakamega Homeboyz (C, P)	38	27	10	1	70	16	+54	91	Promotion to 2013 Kenyan Premier League
2	Nzoia United	38	27	4	7	74	29	+45	85	
3	Agrochemical	38	27	4	7	54	21	+33	85	
4	Nakuru AllStars	38	26	6	6	76	23	+53	84	
5	Finlays Horticulture	38	24	9	5	62	16	+46	81	
6	West Kenya Sugar	38	21	6	11	65	36	+29	69	
7	SOIN Fluorspar	38	19	10	9	59	39	+20	67	
8	Zoo Kericho	38	19	5	14	44	39	+5	62	
9	Longonot Horticulture	38	17	4	17	40	46	−6	55	
10	G.F.C. 105	38	15	8	15	55	53	+2	53	
11	Rush	38	14	6	18	51	48	+3	48	
12	Kisumu Municipal	38	12	10	16	32	42	−10	46	
13	Timsales	38	11	12	15	49	58	−9	45	
14	Shabana Kisii	38	13	5	20	32	49	−17	44	
15	Utawala	38	11	8	19	42	51	−9	41	
16	Comply	38	9	8	21	40	63	−23	35	
17	Karungu (R)	38	8	8	22	36	77	−41	32	Relegation to 2013 Kenyan Provincial League
18	Outgrowers (R)	38	9	3	26	36	75	−39	30	Relegation to 2013 Kenyan Provincial League
19	Yanga (R)	38	3	5	30	18	85	−67	14	Relegation to 2013 Kenyan Provincial League
20	H.B.C. Mlimani (R)	38	1	3	34	15	84	−69	6	Relegation to 2013 Kenyan Provincial League

Updated to match(es) played on 18 November 2012. Source: FKF Division One, Zone B
Rules for classification: 1) points; 2) goal difference; 3) number of goals scored.
(C) Champions; (P) Promoted; (R) Relegated

== Domestic cups ==
=== President's Cup ===
The 2012 FKF President's Cup began on August 4, 2012, and ended on November 21, 2012. The FKF decided to change the quarter-final fixtures, meaning that A.F.C. Leopards and Kenya Revenue Authority were to now face Karuturi Sports and Sofapaka respectively.

Second round
Gor Mahia	5
Borabu Chiefs	2
Buruburu Sacramento	0
Western Stima	2
Muhoroni Youth	3
West Kenya Sugar	0
Kakamega Homeboyz	2
Bidco United	0
Congo JMJ United	3
Isiolo Youth	1
A.F.C. Leopards	2
Mathare United	0
Sofapaka	3
Ulinzi Stars	0
Longonot Horticulture	1
Mahakama	3
Murang'a United	0
Wamo	1
Tusker	4
Keroka Technical	0
Tetu Stars	0
Talanta	2
Raiply	0
Nzoia United	2
Wazito	2
MOYAS	0
K.R.A.	2
Malindi United	0
Karuturi Sports	4
Nakumatt	0
Nairobi Stima	2
Shabana Kisii	0

Third round
Gor Mahia	1 (5)
Western Stima	1 (4)
Muhoroni Youth	2
Kakamega Homeboyz	1
Congo JMJ United	1
A.F.C. Leopards	3
Sofapaka	4
Mahakama	2
Wamo	0
Tusker	13
Talanta	2
Nzoia United	0
Wazito	1
K.R.A.	2
Karuturi Sports	0 (4)
Nairobi Stima	0 (3)

Quarter-finals
Gor Mahia	0 (4)
Muhoroni Youth	0 (2)
A.F.C. Leopards	3
Karuturi Sports	1
Tusker	2
Talanta	0
K.R.A.	1
Sofapaka	2

Semi-finals
Gor Mahia	2
A.F.C. Leopards	1
Tusker	0
Sofapaka	1

Final
Gor Mahia	0 (3)
Sofapaka	0 (0)

=== Super Cup ===
The 2012 Kenyan Super Cup match was played on February 5, 2012, between Tusker, the 2011 Kenyan Premier League champions, and Gor Mahia, the 2011 FKL Cup winners. Tusker won 4−1 on penalties after the match ended 1−1 at full-time.

5 February 2012	Tusker	1 – 1 (4 – 1 p)	Gor Mahia	Nyayo National Stadium, Nairobi
15:00 UTC+3	Mandela 27'	News; Starting line-ups	Abondo 11'
	Penalties
	Atudo (penalty scored); Mbugi (penalty scored); Otieno (penalty scored); Mandela (penalty scored)		(penalty missed) Odhiambo; (penalty missed) Mosoti; (penalty scored) Salim

=== Top 8 Cup ===
The 2012 KPL Top 8 Cup began on March 14, 2012, and ended on August 19, 2012.

Quarterfinals
Ulinzi Stars	2 (2)
Chemelil Sugar	2 (1)
Sofapaka	0
Sony Sugar	1
Gor Mahia	2
A.F.C. Leopards	0
Tusker	3
Rangers	2

Semifinals
Ulinzi Stars	1	2	3
Sony Sugar	1	1	2
Gor Mahia	1	3	4
Tusker	0	0	0

Finals
Ulinzi Stars	0
Gor Mahia	2

== International club competitions ==
=== Champions League ===
The 2012 CAF Champions League began on February 18, 2012, and ended on November 11, 2012. Tusker qualified for participation in the tournament as 2011 Kenyan Premier League champions. They were knocked out on aggregate in the preliminary round by Armée Patriotique Rwandaise, who advanced to the first round.

February 18, 2012 Preliminaries	Tusker (Kenya)	0 – 0	(Rwanda) A.P.R.	Nyayo National Stadium, Nairobi
16:00 UTC+03:00		Report		Referee: Denis Batte (Uganda)

March 4, 2012 Preliminaries	A.P.R. (Rwanda)	1 – 0	(Kenya) Tusker	Stade Régional Nyamirambo, Kigali
15:30 UTC+02:00	Papy 52'	Report		Referee: Israel Mujuni (Tanzania)

=== Confederation Cup ===
The 2012 CAF Confederation Cup began on February 18, 2012, and ended on November 25, 2012. Gor Mahia qualified for participation in the tournament as the 2011 FKL Cup champions. They were knocked out on aggregate in the preliminary round by Ferroviário de Maputo, who advanced to the first round. The Mozambican club had also requested to postpone the second leg by a week.

February 18, 2012 Preliminaries	Ferroviário de Maputo (Mozambique)	3 – 0	(Kenya) Gor Mahia	Estádio do Zimpeto, Maputo
19:00 UTC+02:00	Baugue 4'; Nzili 59'; Diogo 85'	Report		Referee: Kalyoto Ngosi (Malawi)

March 10, 2012 Preliminaries	Gor Mahia (Kenya)	0 – 1	(Mozambique) Ferroviário de Maputo	Nyayo National Stadium, Nairobi
16:00 UTC+03:00		Report	Pilale 30'	Referee: Hubert Andriamiharisoa (Madagascar)

=== Kagame Interclub Cup ===
The 2012 Kagame Interclub Cup began on July 14, 2012, and ended on July 28, 2012. Tusker were invited to represent Kenya in the tournament as the 2011 Kenyan Premier League champions. They were knocked out in the group stage.

Team	Pld	W	D	L	GF	GA	GD	Pts
(Tanzania) Azam	2	0	2	0	1	1	0	2 (Note: Tiebreakers: Azam, Mafunzo and Tusker are all tied on points as shown above, but Azam and Mafunzo are ranked ahead of Tusker because of having more goals scored in the group, and Azam is ranked higher than Mafunzo because, since all of their criteria are the same, the first letter on their team name (A) is higher in the alphabet.)
(Zanzibar) Mafunzo	2	0	2	0	1	1	0	2
(Kenya) Tusker	2	0	2	0	0	0	0	2

Notes:

July 19, 2012 Group stage	Mafunzo (Zanzibar)	0–0	(Kenya) Tusker	Benjamin Mkapa National Stadium
16:00 UTC+3		Report		Referee: Thierry Nkurunziza (Burundi)

July 21, 2012 Group stage	Azam (Tanzania)	0–0	(Kenya) Tusker	Benjamin Mkapa National Stadium
14:00 UTC+3		Report		Referee: Issa Kagabo (Rwanda)

== National teams ==
=== Men ===
==== World Cup qualification ====
The national team advanced to the second round of World Cup qualifications in Africa after beating Seychelles 7–0 on aggregate in the first round. 2014 FIFA World Cup qualification – CAF Second round

June 2, 2012	Kenya	0 – 0	Malawi	Moi International Sports Centre, Nairobi
16:00 UTC+3		Report		Referee: Eric Otogo-Castane (Gabon)

June 9, 2012	Namibia	1 – 0	Kenya	Sam Nujoma Stadium, Windhoek
18:00 UTC+1	Botes 75'	Report		Referee: Joshua Bondo (Botswana)

==== Africa Cup of Nations qualification ====
The national team participated in the first round of qualification to the 2013 Africa Cup of Nations. They beat Togo 2–1 in the first leg on 29 February. However, they were beaten 1–0 in the second leg on 17 June and lost on away goals rule. Therefore, they did not advance to the second round.

February 29, 2012	Kenya	2 – 1	Togo	Nyayo National Stadium, Nairobi
17:00 UTC+3	Situma 24'; Wanga 66'	Report	Boukari 42'	Referee: Rajindraparsad Seechurn (Mauritius)

June 17, 2012	Togo	1 – 0	Kenya	Stade de Kégué, Lomé
15:30 UTC±0	Gakpé 59'			Referee: Neant Alioum (Cameroon)

==== African Nations Championship qualification ====
The national team participated in the preliminary round of qualification for the 2014 African Nations Championship. The second leg was to be played on 5 January 2013.

December 16, 2013	Burundi	1 – 0	Burundi	Louis Rwagasore Stadium, Bujumbura
				Referee: Gervais Munyanziza (Rwanda)

==== CECAFA Cup ====
Kenya were to host the CECAFA Cup to be held at the end of the year, and it would've been the first time they host the tournament since 2009 and the sixth time overall. However, CECAFA Secretary General Nicholas Musonye announced that the tournament was to be hosted in Uganda and not Kenya.

Team	Pld	W	D	L	GF	GA	GD	Pts
Uganda	3	3	0	0	6	0	+6	9
Kenya	3	2	0	1	5	2	+3	6
Ethiopia	3	1	0	2	2	4	−2	3
South Sudan	3	0	0	3	0	7	−7	0

24 November 2012 Group stage	Uganda	1 – 0	Kenya	Kampala, Uganda
18:00 UTC+3	Guma (yellow card) 66'; Kizito 74'	Report 1 Report 2 Report 3	Mang'oli (yellow card) 21'; Kimani (yellow card) 64'	Stadium: Namboole Stadium; Referee: Thierry Nkurunzinza (Burundi)

27 November 2012 Group stage	South Sudan	0 – 2	Kenya	Kampala, Uganda
15:00 UTC+3	Atiti (yellow card) 23'	Report 1 Report 2 Report 3	Ochieng 13'; Miheso 66'	Stadium: Namboole Stadium; Referee: Israel Mujuni (Tanzania)

30 November 2012 Group stage	Kenya	3 – 1	Ethiopia	Kampala, Uganda
16:00 UTC+3	Salim 19'; Miheso 26'; D. Ochieng 72'	Report 1 Report 2	Deriba (yellow card) 21'; Mamo 30'; Girma (yellow card) 78'	Stadium: Namboole Stadium; Referee: Thierry Nkurunziza (Burundi)

Knockout stage bracket

Quarter-finals
3 December
Rwanda	0
Tanzania	2
4 December
Uganda	2
Ethiopia	0
3 December
Burundi	0 (5)
Zanzibar	0 (6)
4 December
Kenya	1
Malawi	0

Semi-finals
6 December
Tanzania	0
Uganda	3
6 December
Zanzibar	2 (2)
Kenya	2 (4)

Final
8 December
Uganda	2
Kenya	1
Third place
8 December
Tanzania	1 (5)
Zanzibar	1 (6)

4 December 2012 Quarter-finals	Kenya	1 – 0	Malawi	Kampala, Uganda
16:00 UTC+3	Owino (yellow card) 49'; Baraza 58'	Report		Stadium: Namboole Stadium; Referee: Israel Mujuni (Tanzania)

6 December 2012 Semi-finals	Zanzibar	2 – 2 (2 – 4 p)	Kenya	Kampala, Uganda
16:00 UTC+3	Khamis 21'; Adeyom (yellow card) 58' (red card) 122'; Morris 76' (pen.)	Report	Haroub 30' (o.g.); Atudo (yellow card) 65'; Modo Kimani (yellow card) 75'; Baraza 81'	Stadium: Namboole Stadium; Referee: Thierry Nkurunziza (Burundi)
	Penalties
	Khamis (penalty missed); Ally Othman (penalty missed); Morris (penalty scored); Nuhu (penalty scored)		Baraza (penalty scored); Atudo (penalty scored); Lavatsa (penalty scored); Abdalla (penalty scored)

8 December 2012 Final	Uganda	2 – 1	Kenya	Kampala, Uganda
18:00 UTC+3	Ssentongo 28'; Okwi (yellow card) 41'; Kizito 90'	Report	Baraza (yellow card) 39'; Atudo (yellow card) 79'; Lavatsa 87'	Stadium: Namboole Stadium; Referee: Thierry Nkurunziza (Burundi)

==== Other matches ====
The following is a list of all other matches played by the Kenya men's team in 2012.

February 23, 2012 Friendly	Egypt	Cancelled	Kenya	Cairo, Egypt
				Stadium: Cairo International Stadium

February 27, 2012 Friendly	Egypt	5 – 0	Kenya	Doha, Qatar
	Salah 10'; Hassan 18' (pen.); Abdel Malek 69' (pen.); Khairy 73'; El-Zaher 89'	Report		Stadium: Al-Gharafa Stadium

July 12, 2012 Friendly	Kenya	3 – 1	Botswana	Nairobi, Kenya
	Miheso 49', 54'; Mungai 67'	Report	Sembowa 18'	Stadium: Nyayo National Stadium

August 25, 2012 Friendly	Jamaica	Cancelled	Kenya	East Hartford, United States
				Stadium: Rentschler Field

October 16, 2012 Friendly	Kenya	1 – 2	South Africa	Nairobi, Kenya
	Oliech 74' (pen.)	Report	Rantie 19'; Wekesa 77' (o.g.)	Stadium: Nyayo National Stadium

November 14, 2012 Friendly	Tanzania	1 – 0	Kenya	Mwanza, Tanzania
	Morris 5'	Report		Stadium: CCM Kirumba Stadium

=== Women ===
The following is a list of all matches played by the Kenya women's team in 2012.

September 30, 2012 Friendly	Ethiopia	5 – 0	Kenya	Addis Ababa, Ethiopia
	Sisay (?); Zerga (?)	Report 1 Report 2		Stadium: Addis Ababa Stadium
