= 2012 Kenyan Premier League =

Kenyan Premier League
- Season: 2012
- Champions: Tusker; 5th Premier League title 10th Kenyan title overall
- Relegated: Rangers; Oserian
- Champions League: Tusker
- Confederation Cup: Gor Mahia (cup winner)
- Top 8 Cup: Tusker; Gor Mahia; A.F.C. Leopards; Sofapaka; Thika United; Ulinzi Stars; Chemelil Sugar; Mathare United
- Matches: 240
- Goals: 458 (1.91 per match)
- Top goalscorer: John Baraza (Sofapaka) (18 goals)
- Biggest home win: KCB 4–0 Nairobi City Stars (2 March 2012); A.F.C. Leopards 6-2 Rangers (8 April 2012)
- Biggest away win: Rangers 0–6 Thika United (25 March 2012)
- Highest scoring: A.F.C. Leopards 6-2 Rangers (8 April 2012)
- Highest attendance: 20,409 (Gor Mahia versus AFC Leopards)

The 2012 Kenyan Premier League (known as the Tusker Premier League for sponsorship reasons) was the ninth season of the Kenyan Premier League since its establishment in 2003 and the forty-ninth season of top division football in Kenya since 1963. It began on 11 February with Tusker and Nairobi City Stars and ended on 10 November with Oserian and Rangers. The winners of the league will earn a place at the preliminary round of the 2013 CAF Champions League and play against the 2012 FKF President's Cup champions at the 2013 Kenyan Super Cup.

The defending champions Tusker, who also became the defending champions of the Kenyan Super Cup after beating Gor Mahia, the defending champions of the FKF Cup, earlier in the year, won their tenth league title after beating Nairobi City Stars 3−0 away at the Hope Centre. Gor Mahia, the former league leaders with 58 points (Tusker were second with 57), needed a win against Thika United to clinch a record thirteenth title, but the match ended in a 1−1 draw. A.F.C. Leopards, who were third with 57 points (Tusker were ahead on goal difference), also needed a win for a chance at a record thirteenth title as well, but lost 1−0 away to Chemelil Sugar.

A total of 16 teams are competed for the league, with fourteen returning from the 2011 season and one promoted from the FKL Nationwide League and the KFF Nationwide League, which were joint to make FKF Division One after the 2011 season. FKL champions Oserian and KFF champions Muhoroni Youth were promoted, while Congo JMJ United and Bandari, finishing last and second-last respectively, were relegated. Oserian were relegated at the end of the season, along with Rangers.

The league was halted at the end of 20 May to give teams a chance to rest and make possible changes in their squads during the mid-year transfer window. Matches resumed on 23 June.

On 21 August, the Kenyan Premier League and East African Breweries signed a KSh 170 million/= (US$2.02 million; £1.28 million sterling; €1.62 million) deal to rename the league to the Tusker Premier League, making it the most lucrative deal in Kenyan football history.

== Changes from last season ==
Locations of the 2012 Kenyan Premier League teams.
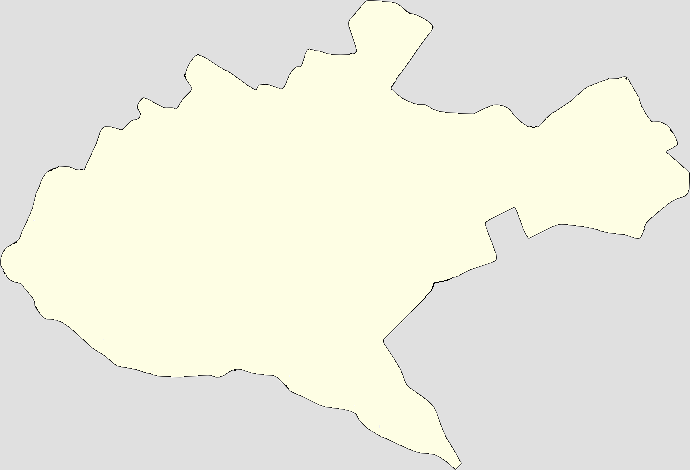
Locations of the 2012 Kenyan Premier League teams within Nairobi.

Relegated from Premier League

- Bandari
- Congo JMJ United

Promoted from FKL and KFF

- Oserian
- Muhoroni Youth

== Teams ==
Several teams share common stadiums in the league, the most shared being the Nyayo National Stadium, by A.F.C. Leopards, Muhoroni Youth, Rangers and Sofapaka.

Half of all the 16 teams are based in Nairobi.

=== Stadia and locations ===
Team	Location	Stadium	Capacity
A.F.C. Leopards	Nairobi	Nyayo National Stadium	30,000
Chemelil Sugar	Chemelil	Chemelil Sports Complex	5,000
Gor Mahia	Nairobi	Nairobi City Stadium	15,000
Karuturi Sports	Naivasha	Naivasha Stadium	5,000
KCB	Nairobi	Nairobi City Stadium	15,000
Mathare United	Nairobi	Kasarani Stadium	60,000
Muhoroni Youth	Muhoroni	Muhoroni Stadium	5,000
Nairobi City Stars	Nairobi	Hope Centre	5,000
Oserian	Naivasha	Naivasha Stadium	5,000
Rangers	Nairobi	Nyayo National Stadium	30,000
Sofapaka	Nairobi	Nyayo National Stadium	30,000
Sony Sugar	Awendo	Green Stadium	5,000
Thika United	Thika	Thika Municipal Stadium	5,000
Tusker	Nairobi	Kasarani Stadium	60,000
Ulinzi Stars	Nakuru	Afraha Stadium	8,200
Western Stima	Kakamega	Bukhungu Stadium	5,000

=== Personnel and kits ===
As of September 24, 2012.

Team	Head coach	Captain	Kit manufacturer
A.F.C. Leopards	(Netherlands) Jan Koops	(Kenya) Martin Imbalambala	Legea
Chemelil Sugar	(Kenya) Edward Manoah	(Kenya) Charles Odero	Adidas
Gor Mahia	(Croatia) Zdravko Logarusić	(Kenya) Jerim Onyango	Legea
Karuturi Sports	(Kenya) Michael Nam	(Kenya) Amon Muchiri	Adidas
Kenya Commercial Bank	(Kenya) James Omondi	(Kenya) Joseph Kangata	Adidas
Mathare United	(Kenya) Stanley Okumbi	(Kenya) Anthony Kimani	Puma
Muhoroni Youth	(Kenya) Alfred Imonje	(Kenya) Nicholas Owende	Prima
Nairobi City Stars	(Kenya) Gideon Ochieng	(Kenya) John Amboko	Adidas
Oserian	(Kenya) Sammy Omollo	(Kenya) John Keo	Adidas
Rangers	(Kenya) James Nandwa	(Kenya) Victor Omondi	Adidas
Sofapaka	(England) Stewart Hall	(Kenya) James Situma	Adidas
Sony Sugar	(Kenya) Zedekiah Otieno	(Kenya) Wilson Oburu	Joma
Thika United	(Kenya) John Kamau	(Kenya) Kepha Aswani	Legea
Tusker	(Kenya) Robert Matano	(Kenya) Joseph Shikokoti	Legea
Ulinzi Stars	(Kenya) Sammy Simiyu	(Kenya) Geoffrey Kokoyo	Adidas
Western Stima	(Kenya) Henry Omino	(Kenya) George Wesa	Adidas

=== Managerial changes ===
As of September 24, 2012.

Team	Outgoing	Reason	Date of vacancy	Incoming	Date of appointment	Table position
Gor Mahia	(Kenya) Zedekiah Otieno	End of contract	December 2011	(Cameroon) Anaba Awono	17 December 2011	End of 2011 season
Gor Mahia	(Cameroon) Anaba Awono	Sacked	5 March 2012	(Kenya) John Bobby Ogolla	7 March 2012	N/A
Gor Mahia	(Kenya) John Bobby Ogolla	Demoted	March 2012	(Croatia) Zdravko Logarusić	March 2012	N/A
Mathare United	(Kenya) Gabriel Njoroge	Resigned	March 2012	(Kenya) Stanley Okumbi	March 2012	N/A
Muhoroni Youth	(Kenya) Alfred Imonje	Suspended	April 2012 (then resigned)	Reinstated	May 2012	12th
Nairobi City Stars	(Kenya) Gideon Ochieng	Resigned	December 2011	Reinstated	December 2011	End of 2011 season
Oserian	(Kenya) Sammy Otinga	Resigned	June 2012	(Kenya) Gilbert Selebwa	June 2012	16th
Oserian	(Kenya) Gilbert Selebwa	Back to TD	18 August 2012	(Kenya) Sammy Omollo	20 August 2012	16th
Rangers	(Kenya) David Ouma	Sacked	December 2011	(Kenya) Ezekiel Akwana	January 2012	End of 2011 season
Rangers	(Kenya) Ezekiel Akwana	Resigned	April 2012	(Kenya) Jaffer Gichuki	April 2012	N/A
Rangers	(Kenya) Jaffer Gichuki	Resigned	June 2012	(Kenya) James Nandwa	22 June 2012	15th
Sofapaka	(Kenya) Salim Ali	Sacked	21 August 2012	(England) Stewart Hall	12 September 2012	3rd
Sony Sugar	(Kenya) Francis Baraza	Sacked	January 2012	(Kenya) Zedekiah Otieno	January 2012	End of 2011 season
Tusker	(Kenya) Sammy Omollo	Sacked	15 August 2012	(Kenya) Robert Matano	24 August 2012	2nd
Ulinzi Stars	(Kenya) Benjamin Nyangweso	Sacked	March 2012	(Kenya) Sammy Simiyu	1 April 2012	N/A

== League table ==
Pos	Team	Pld	W	D	L	GF	GA	GD	Pts	Qualification or relegation
1	Tusker (C, Q)	30	17	9	4	39	14	+25	60	Qualification for 2013 CAF Champions League
2	Gor Mahia (Q)	30	17	8	5	37	18	+19	59	Qualification for 2013 CAF Confederation Cup (Note: Gor Mahia qualified for the 2013 CAF Confederation Cup as winners of the 2012 FKF President's Cup.)
3	A.F.C. Leopards	30	17	6	7	45	27	+18	57	
4	Sofapaka	30	13	9	8	34	24	+10	48	
5	Thika United	30	12	10	8	36	33	+3	46	
6	Ulinzi Stars	30	13	6	11	35	29	+6	45	
7	Chemelil Sugar	30	9	14	7	18	17	+1	41	
8	Mathare United	30	10	11	9	36	36	0	41	
9	Western Stima	30	11	7	12	27	25	+2	40	
10	Kenya Commercial Bank	30	11	6	13	35	31	+4	39	
11	Sony Sugar	30	11	5	14	26	26	0	38	
12	Karuturi Sports	30	7	11	12	18	26	−8	32	
13	Nairobi City Stars	30	6	11	13	16	32	−16	29	
14	Muhoroni Youth	30	7	6	17	19	34	−15	27	
15	Oserian (R)	30	5	9	16	15	33	−18	24	Relegation to 2013 FKF Division One
16	Rangers (R)	30	4	12	14	22	53	−31	24	Relegation to 2013 FKF Division One

Updated to match(es) played on 10 November 2012. Source: Kenyan Premier League
Rules for classification: 1) points; 2) goal difference; 3) number of goals scored.
(C) Champions; (Q) Qualified for the phase indicated; (R) Relegated

== Positions by round ==
The table lists the positions of teams after each week of matches. In order to preserve chronological evolvements, any postponed matches are not included to the round at which they were originally scheduled, but added to the full round they were played immediately afterwards. For example, if a match is scheduled for matchday 13, but then postponed and played between days 16 and 17, it will be added to the standings for day 16.

Team ╲ Round	1	2	3	4	5	6	7	8	9	10	11	12	13	14	15	16	17	18	19	20	21	22	23	24	25	26	27	28	29	30
Tusker	4	9	11	6	3	3	4	4	4	4	2	3	3	2	2	1	1	2	2	2	3	2	2	3	1	1	1	2	2	1
Gor Mahia	2	6	10	12	14	13	12	12	14	11	12	11	10	9	9	6	6	6	6	4	5	6	5	2	2	2	2	1	1	2
A.F.C. Leopards	5	2	2	2	1	1	1	1	1	1	1	1	1	3	3	3	2	1	1	1	1	1	1	1	3	3	3	3	3	3
Sofapaka	11	3	3	1	2	2	2	2	2	2	4	2	2	1	1	2	3	4	5	3	2	3	3	5	6	6	4	4	4	4
Thika United	16	15	12	13	12	11	5	5	5	5	5	5	4	4	4	5	5	5	3	6	6	5	4	4	5	5	6	6	6	5
Ulinzi Stars	14	8	7	11	7	9	10	11	9	9	9	7	9	7	7	4	4	3	4	5	4	4	6	6	4	4	5	5	5	6
Chemelil Sugar	6	11	1	4	8	4	3	3	3	3	3	4	6	8	8	7	7	8	9	9	10	10	11	8	8	10	8	9	8	7
Mathare United	15	16	16	16	16	16	15	15	12	12	13	13	14	14	14	13	14	13	13	12	11	8	9	11	11	11	9	7	9	8
Western Stima	12	5	6	7	5	8	9	6	8	6	7	6	5	5	5	8	8	9	7	7	7	7	7	7	7	7	7	8	10	9
Kenya Commercial Bank	3	7	4	3	4	6	6	8	7	10	10	9	7	10	10	12	12	10	10	10	12	12	10	12	10	9	11	11	11	10
SoNy Sugar	1	1	5	5	9	10	11	10	11	13	11	12	12	13	13	11	11	12	11	11	9	11	8	10	9	8	10	10	7	11
Vegpro	7	13	14	8	6	7	8	9	6	8	6	8	8	6	6	9	9	7	8	8	8	9	12	9	12	12	12	12	12	12
Nairobi City Stars	13	14	15	14	15	15	16	14	16	16	15	16	13	12	12	10	10	11	12	13	13	13	13	13	14	14	13	13	13	13
Muhoroni Youth	8	4	8	10	13	5	7	7	10	7	8	10	11	11	11	14	13	14	14	14	15	14	14	14	13	13	14	14	14	14
Oserian	9	12	9	9	11	14	14	16	13	14	14	15	16	16	16	16	15	15	15	16	16	16	16	15	15	15	15	16	16	15
Rangers	10	10	13	15	10	12	13	13	15	15	16	14	15	15	15	15	16	16	16	15	14	15	15	16	16	16	16	15	15	16

Leader
Relegation to the 2013 FKF Division One

Updated to match(es) played on 10 November 2012. Source: Futaa.com
Notes: Top 8 qualified to the 2013 KPL Top 8 Cup

== Results ==
Home \ Away	AFC	CHM	GOR	VGP	KCB	MAU	MHY	NCS	OSE	RAN	SOF	SNY	THU	TUS	ULS	WST
A.F.C. Leopards		0–0	1–2	1–0	0–2	4–2	2–1	1–0	2–0	6–2	1–0	1–1	5–0	0–2	2–1	2–1
Chemelil Sugar	1–0		0–1	0–0	1–0	1–0	0–0	0–0	1–1	1–1	1–0	2–0	0–0	1–1	1–0	0–1
Gor Mahia	0–0	1–0		1–0	3–1	1–1	0–1	2–1	1–0	1–1	1–0	1–0	1–1	1–0	1–0	0–0
Vegpro	1–1	2–0	1–0		1–1	1–3	1–0	0–0	1–0	0–1	0–0	1–0	0–1	0–2	0–0	1–0
Kenya Commercial Bank	1–2	0–0	2–3	1–2		0–1	3–0	4–0	3–0	3–1	2–1	0–1	2–3	0–2	2–1	0–2
Mathare United	0–2	2–2	2–2	1–1	0–1		2–1	1–0	1–0	1–1	2–0	3–1	1–2	1–0	2–2	0–0
Muhoroni Youth	1–2	0–1	0–4	2–1	1–2	1–1		3–0	1–0	0–0	0–2	1–0	0–1	0–1	1–2	0–0
Nairobi City Stars	3–0	0–0	0–4	0–0	1–0	1–1	1–2		1–0	0–0	0–0	0–1	3–2	0–3	0–0	0–0
Oserian	1–3	0–1	1–0	1–0	0–0	2–1	0–0	1–0		3–0	0–0	1–2	0–1	0–0	0–2	0–0
Rangers	0–0	0–0	1–2	0–0	0–0	1–1	0–1	0–0	2–2		0–2	1–0	0–6	2–4	0–3	2–1
Sofapaka	2–1	1–1	0–0	2–1	2–1	2–0	2–2	2–0	0–0	2–1		2–2	0–1	0–0	3–2	1–2
SoNy Sugar	0–1	0–1	0–0	0–0	1–0	3–1	1–0	1–1	1–0	3–1	0–1		3–0	0–1	1–0	2–0
Thika United	1–2	0–0	0–2	1–0	1–1	2–1	1–0	0–1	1–1	4–0	1–4	1–0		0–0	2–2	0–0
Tusker	0–0	2–0	2–0	2–2	0–0	2–2	1–0	2–1	3–1	2–0	0–1	1–0	2–1		0–0	2–0
Ulinzi Stars	0–2	2–1	1–0	2–1	1–2	0–1	2–0	2–1	2–0	3–1	1–0	2–1	1–1	0–2		1–0
Western Stima	2–1	2–1	1–2	3–0	0–1	0–1	1–0	0–1	3–0	2–3	1–2	2–1	1–1	1–0	1–0	

Updated to match(es) played on 10 November 2012. Source: Kenyan Premier League
Legend: Blue = home team win; Yellow = draw; Red = away team win.

== Top scorers ==
Rank	Player	Club	Goals
1	(Kenya) John Baraza	Sofapaka	18
2	(Uganda) Dan Sserunkuma	Gor Mahia	17
3	(Kenya) Rama Salim	Gor Mahia	12
3	(Kenya) Kepha Aswani	Thika United	12
3	(Kenya) Evans Amuoka	Ulinzi Stars	12
6	(Kenya) Paul Kiongera	Kenya Commercial Bank	11
7	(Kenya) Jesse Were	Mathare United	10
8	(Kenya) Mike Baraza	A.F.C. Leopards	9
9	(Kenya) Francis Ouma	Mathare United	8
9	(Kenya) Andrew Tololwa	Mathare United	8
9	(Kenya) Ismail Salim	Sony Sugar	8
9	(Kenya) Erasto Ndege	Tusker	8

Last updated: 10 November 2012

== See also ==
- 2012 Kenyan Women's Premier League
- 2012 FKF President's Cup
- 2012 KPL Top 8 Cup
- 2012 Kenyan Super Cup
