= KPL Awards =

Award ceremony for football/soccer players

- Awarded for: Excellent performance during the KPL season
- Country: Kenya
- Presented by: Kenyan Premier League

History
- Final award: 2014
- Most recent: Player of the Year: (Kenya) Ekaliana Ndolo; Young Player of the Year: (Kenya) Kennedy Owino
- Website: http://www.kpl.co.ke/

The KPL Awards, also known as the KPL Footballer of the Year Awards (FOYA), refer to an awards ceremony held to honour association football players, coaches, officials and journalists participating in the Kenyan Premier League. They are conferred by the Football Kenya Federation.

== History ==
Winners are highlighted in bold and placed in non-indented bullets ( • ). Nominees are placed in order from first to third place in indented bullets. If there is more than one winner (nominees both placed in non-indented bullets) or more than one runner-up (nominees both placed in one indented bullet with a line break separating them), then the award was shared between the winners.

=== 2009 ===
The 2009 KPL Awards were held on December 9, 2009 at the Panari Hotel in Nairobi.

Player and team awards
Guinness Player of the Year
- **(Kenya) John Baraza − Sofapaka**
  - (Kenya) Peter Opiyo − Gor Mahia
  - (Kenya) Joseph Nyaga − Mathare United
Young Player of the Year^{[1]}
- **(Kenya) George Odhiambo – Gor Mahia**
  - (Kenya) Peter Opiyo − Gor Mahia
  - (Kenya) David Gateri − Nairobi City Stars
Fair Play Player of the Year
- **(Kenya) Dennis Okoth − Nairobi City Stars**
  - (Kenya) James Situma − Sofapaka
  - (Kenya) Mark Sirengo − Western Stima
Fair Play Team of the Year
- **Mathare United**
- **Sony Sugar**
Golden Boot
- **(Kenya) John Baraza − Sofapaka**
- **(Kenya) Joseph Emeka − Tusker**
  - (Kenya) Arthur Museve – Nairobi City Stars
Goalkeeper of the Year
- **(Kenya) Noah Ayuko − Sher Karuturi**
  - (Kenya) Duncan Ochieng − Mathare United
  - (Kenya) Wilson Obungu − Sofapaka
Defender of the Year
- **(Kenya) Edgar Ochieng − Mathare United**
  - (Kenya) Jockins Atudo − Tusker
  - (Kenya) Francis Akango − Gor Mahia
Midfielder of the Year
- **(Kenya) Peter Opiyo − Gor Mahia**
  - (Kenya) Humphrey Mieno − Sofapaka
  - (Kenya) James Situma – Sofapaka
Managerial awards
Head coach of the Year
- **(Kenya) Robert Matano – Sofapaka**
  - (Kenya) Francis Kimanzi − Mathare United
  - (Kenya) Gideon Ochieng − Gor Mahia
Team manager of the Year
- **(Kenya) Benson Matindi − Sofapaka**
Referee awards
Referee of the Year^{[2]}
- **Isaac Ochieng**
  - Eliakim Mbalilwa
  - Amos Wanjala
Assistant referee of the Year
- **Walter Ondiege**
  - Selina Kigen
  - Nathaniel Ndwingwa
Journalism awards
Print journalist of the Year
- **(Kenya) Robin Toskin − The Standard**
  - (Kenya) Omulo Okoth − The Standard
  - (Kenya) Charles Nyende – Daily Nation
Television presenter of the Year
- **(Kenya) Mike Okinyi – Citizen**
  - (Kenya) Brian Agina – K24
  - (Kenya) Hassan Juma – KTN
Radio presenter of the Year
- **(Kenya) Joseph Ogidi** and **(Kenya) Jacob Mulee – Radio Jambo**
  - (Kenya) Daniel Wahome – Metro
  - (Kenya) Mohamed Njuguna – Citizen
Photojournalist of the Year
- **(Kenya) Stafford Ondiego − The Standard**
  - (Kenya) Mohamed Amin − Daily Nation
  - (Kenya) Chris Omollo − Daily Nation

Source: michezonet.com

=== 2010 ===
The 2010 KPL Awards were held on November 24, 2011 at the Safari Park Hotel in Nairobi.

Player and team awards
Player of the Year
- **(Kenya) George Odhiambo − Gor Mahia**
  - (Kenya) Stephen Ocholla − Ulinzi Stars
  - (Kenya) John Baraza − Sofapaka
Young Player of the Year^{[1]}
- **Ezekiel Odera – Kenya Commercial Bank**
  - (Kenya) Musa Mohamed − Gor Mahia
  - (Kenya) Edwin Mwaura − Posta Rangers
Fair Play Player of the Year
- **(Kenya) Allan Otindo − Karuturi Sports**
  - (Kenya) George Odhiambo − Gor Mahia
  - (Kenya) John Baraza − Sofapaka
Fair Play Team of the Year
- **Western Stima**
Golden Boot
- **(Kenya) John Baraza − Sofapaka**
  - Ezekiel Odera – Kenya Commercial Bank
  - (Kenya) Allan Otindo − Karuturi Sports
Goalkeeper of the Year
- **(Kenya) Francis Ochieng − Ulinzi Stars**
  - (Kenya) Martin Musalia − Mathare United
  - (Kenya) Jerim Onyango − Gor Mahia
Defender of the Year
- **(Kenya) Geoffrey Kokoyo − Ulinzi Stars**
  - (Kenya) David Otieno − Sony Sugar
  - (Kenya) James Situma − Sofapaka
Midfielder of the Year
- **(Kenya) Anthony Kimani − Sofapaka**
  - (Kenya) Stephen Ocholla − Ulinzi Stars
  - (Kenya) Collins Okoth – Gor Mahia
Managerial and referee awards
Head coach of the Year
- **(Kenya) Benjamin Nyangweso – Ulinzi Stars**
  - (Kenya) Zedekiah Otieno − Gor Mahia
  - (Kenya) James Nandwa − Tusker
Team manager of the Year
- **(Kenya) Jack Matanguta − Ulinzi Stars**
  - (Kenya) Jolawi Abondo − Gor Mahia
  - (Kenya) Paul Makumi − Tusker
Referee of the Year^{[2]}
- **Isaac Ochieng**
  - Nasur Doka
  - Richard Obare
Journalism awards
Print journalist of the Year
- **(Kenya) Robin Toskin − The Standard**
  - (Kenya) Gilbert Wandera − The Standard
  - (Kenya) John Ashiundu – Taifa Leo
Television presenter of the Year
- **(Kenya) Hassan Juma – KTN**
  - (Kenya) Idris Situma – NTV
  - (Kenya) Mike Okinyi – Citizen
Radio presenter of the Year
- **(Kenya) Diamond Okusimba** and **(Kenya) Toldo Kuria – Radio Jambo**
  - (Kenya) Paul Mcheshi – Milele FM
  - (Kenya) Torome Tirike and (Kenya) Paul Muchiri
Photojournalist of the Year
- **(Kenya) Stafford Ondiego − The Standard**
  - (Kenya) Mohamed Amin − Daily Nation
  - (Kenya) Chris Omollo − Daily Nation

Source: michezoafrika.com

=== 2011 ===
The 2011 KPL Awards were held on December 7, 2011 at the Safari Park Hotel in Nairobi.

Player and team awards
Player of the Year
- **(Kenya) Kevin Kimani − Mathare United**
  - (Kenya) Charles Okwemba − A.F.C. Leopards
  - (Kenya) Stephen Waruru − Ulinzi Stars
Young Player of the Year^{[1]}
- **(Kenya) Rama Salim – Congo JMJ United**
  - (Uganda) Dan Sserunkuma − Nairobi City Stars
  - Eric Okoth − Kenya Commercial Bank
Fair Play Player of the Year
- **(Kenya) Vincent Nyaberi − Thika United**
  - (Kenya) David Juma − Western Stima
  - (Kenya) Anthony Kimani − Mathare United
Team of the Year
- **Tusker**
  - Ulinzi Stars
  - Sofapaka
Fair Play Team of the Year
- **Rangers**
  - Ulinzi Stars
  - Western Stima
Golden Boot
- **(Kenya) Stephen Waruru − Ulinzi Stars**
  - Mike Baraza – A.F.C. Leopards
    Clifford Alwanga – Kenya Commercial Bank
    Kevin Kimani – Mathare United
    Hugo Nzangu – Sony Sugar
Goalkeeper of the Year
- **(Kenya) Boniface Oluoch − Tusker**
  - (Kenya) Jacktone Odhiambo − Ulinzi Stars
  - (Kenya) Lawrence Webo − Rangers
Defender of the Year
- **(Kenya) Pascal Ochieng − Rangers**
  - (Kenya) Eric Masika − Gor Mahia
  - (Kenya) Joseph Shikokoti − Tusker
Midfielder of the Year
- **(Kenya) Kevin Kimani − Mathare United**
  - (Kenya) Charles Okwemba − A.F.C. Leopards
  - (Kenya) Humphrey Mieno – Sofapaka
Managerial awards
Head coach of the Year
- **(Kenya) Sammy Omollo – Tusker**
  - (Kenya) Benjamin Nyangweso – Ulinzi Stars
  - (Kenya) Francis Kimanzi − Sofapaka
Team manager of the Year
- **(Kenya) Jack Gatheru – Karuturi Sports**
- **(Kenya) Neville Pudo – Tusker**
  - (Kenya) Jack Matanguta − Ulinzi Stars
    (Kenya) Willis Waliaula − Rangers
Referee awards
Referee of the Year^{[2]}
- **Nasur Doka**
  - Sylvester Kirwa
  - Davies Omweno
Assistant referee of the Year
- **Aden Marwa**
  - Mike Mwangi
  - Jane Cherono
Journalism awards
Print journalist of the Year
- **(Kenya) Gilbert Wandera − The Standard**
  - (Kenya) Isaac Swila − People Daily
  - (Kenya) James Waindi – The Standard
Television presenter of the Year
- **(Kenya) David Kwalimwa – K24**
  - (Kenya) Hassan Juma – KTN
  - (Kenya) Mike Okinyi – Citizen
Radio presenter/station of the Year
- **(Kenya) Diamond Okusimba**, **(Kenya) Toldo Kuria** and
  **(Kenya) William Gathoki** – Radio Jambo
  - (Kenya) Ali Hassan and (Kenya) Steve Mukanggai – Radio Maisha
  - (Kenya) Joseph Maroa – Milele FM
Photojournalist of the Year
- **(Kenya) Stafford Ondiego − The Standard**
  - (Kenya) Kena Claude − People Daily
  - (Kenya) Chris Omollo − Daily Nation
Chairman's Award
- **Futaa.com**
  - MichezoAfrika.com
  - KenyanStar.co.ke

Sources: michezoafrika.com and muchene.com

=== 2012 ===
The 2012 KPL Awards were held on November 16, 2012 at the Safari Park Hotel in Nairobi. There were 16 categories to be handled at the event.

Player and team awards
Player of the Year
- **(Uganda) Dan Sserunkuma − Gor Mahia**
  - Paul Kiongera − Kenya Commercial Bank
  - (Kenya) Mike Baraza − A.F.C. Leopards
Young Player of the Year^{[1]}
- **(Nigeria) Abbey Kunrumi – Muhoroni Youth**
  - (Uganda) Hussein Zzinda − Karuturi Sports
  - (Kenya) Edmond Murai − Oserian
Fair Play Player of the Year
- **(Kenya) John Baraza − Sofapaka**
  - (Uganda) Dan Sserunkuma − Gor Mahia
  - (Kenya) Obadiah Ndege − Tusker
Fair Play Team of the Year
- **Rangers**
  - Ulinzi Stars
  - Muhoroni Youth
Golden Boot
- **(Kenya) John Baraza − Sofapaka**
  - (Uganda) Dan Sserunkuma − Gor Mahia
  - (Kenya) Rama Salim – Gor Mahia,
    (Kenya) Kepha Aswani – Thika United and
    (Kenya) Evans Amuoka – Ulinzi Stars
Goalkeeper of the Year
- **(Kenya) Boniface Oluoch − Tusker**
  - (Kenya) Jerim Onyango − Gor Mahia
  - (Kenya) Roberts Mandela − Western Stima
Defender of the Year
- **(Kenya) Ivan Anguyo − Gor Mahia**
  - (Kenya) Jockins Atudo − Tusker
  - (Kenya) Eugene Asike − Sofapaka
Midfielder of the Year
- **(Kenya) Anthony Akumu − Gor Mahia**
  - (Kenya) Francis Kahata − Thika United
  - Paul Kiongera – Kenya Commercial Bank
Managerial awards
Head coach of the Year
- **(Croatia) Zdravko Logarusić – Gor Mahia**
  - (Kenya) John Kamau – Thika United
  - (Kenya) Stanley Okumbi − Mathare United
Team manager of the Year
- **Josephat Okal – Kenya Commercial Bank**
- **(Kenya) George Maina – Thika United**
  - (Kenya) William Muluya − Mathare United
Referee awards
Referee of the Year^{[2]}
- **Nasur Doka**
  - Davies Omweno
  - Thomas Onyango
Assistant referee of the Year
- **Gilbert Cheruiyot**
  - Mike Mwangi
  - Jane Cherono

Source: sportsnewsarena.com

=== 2013 ===
The 2013 KPL Awards were held at the Safari Park Hotel in Nairobi. 12 categories were handled at the event.

Player and team awards
Player of the Year
- **Jacob Keli − Kenya Commercial Bank**
  - (Kenya) Shaban Kenga − Bandari
  - (Kenya) David Owino − Gor Mahia
Young Player of the Year^{[1]}
- **(Kenya) Sammy Meja – Thika United**
  - (Kenya) Michael Olunga − Tusker
  - (Kenya) Stephen Wakhanya − Chemelil Sugar
Fair Play Player of the Year
- **(Kenya) Dennis Onkangi − Western Stima**
  - (Kenya) Shaban Kenga − Bandari
  - (Kenya) Oliver Ruto − Ulinzi Stars
Fair Play Team of the Year
- **Western Stima**
  - Sofapaka
  - Muhoroni Youth
Golden Boot
- **Jacob Keli − Kenya Commercial Bank**
  - (Kenya) Jesse Were − Tusker
  - (Kenya) Allan Wanga – A.F.C. Leopards
Goalkeeper of the Year
- **(Kenya) Jerim Onyango − Gor Mahia**
  - Sammy Okinda − Kenya Commercial Bank
  - (Kenya) Wycliffe Kasaya − Sony Sugar and
    (Kenya) Wilson Obungu – Bandari
Defender of the Year
- **(Kenya) David Owino − Gor Mahia**
  - John Odhiambo − Kenya Commercial Bank
  - (Democratic Republic of the Congo) Felly Mulumba − Sofapaka
Midfielder of the Year
- **Brian Osumba − Kenya Commercial Bank**
  - (Kenya) Francis Kahata − Thika United
  - (Kenya) Peter Opiyo – A.F.C. Leopards
Managerial awards
Coach of the Year
- **Abdallah Juma – Kenya Commercial Bank**
  - (Kenya) Twahir Muhiddin – Bandari
  - (Kenya) David Ouma − Sofapaka
Team manager of the Year
- **Josephat Okal – Kenya Commercial Bank**
  - (Kenya) Dan Omondi – Karuturi Sports
  - (Kenya) Alfred Achayo − Bandari
Referee awards
Referee of the Year^{[2]}
- **Davies Omweno**
  - Anthony Ogwayo
  - Tabitha Wambui
Assistant referee of the Year
- **Aden Marwa**
  - Peter Kiereini
  - Dorcas Moraa

=== 2014 ===
The 2014 KPL Awards were held on 19 November 2014 at the Safari Park Hotel in Nairobi. 13 categories were handled at the event.

The award ceremony was criticised for the manner in which players, coaches and officials were nominated and awarded, with the Football Kenya Federation stating that it took "strong exception to the manner in which winners of the 2014 awards were named". The Standard journalist Rodgers Eshitemi said the awards "will go down as the most shambolic fete ever in Kenya's football history".

Player and team awards
Player of the Year
- **(Kenya) Ekaliana Ndolo − Sofapaka**
  - (Uganda) Geoffrey Kizito − Gor Mahia
  - (Kenya) Stephen Waruru − Ulinzi Stars
Young Player of the Year^{[1]}
- **(Kenya) Kennedy Owino – Top Fry AllStars**
  - (Kenya) Kevin Omondi − Nairobi City Stars
  - (Kenya) Nicholas Kamau − Nairobi City Stars
Fair Play Player of the Year
- **(Kenya) Hamisi Mwinyi − Chemelil Sugar**
  - (Kenya) John Njoroge − Sofapaka
  - (Kenya) Barack Odhiambo − Ushuru
Fair Play Team of the Year
- **Western Stima**
  - Sofapaka
  - Muhoroni Youth
Golden Boot
- **(Uganda) Dan Sserunkuma − Gor Mahia**
  - (Kenya) Enock Agwanda − Sofapaka
  - (Kenya) Stephen Waruru – Ulinzi Stars
  - (Kenya) Michael Olunga – Thika United
  - (Kenya) Jesse Were – Tusker
Goalkeeper of the Year
- **(Kenya) Jairus Adira − Chemelil Sugar**
  - (Kenya) Robert Mboya − Mathare United
  - (Kenya) Jerim Onyango − Gor Mahia
Defender of the Year
- **(Kenya) David Owino − Gor Mahia**
  - (Kenya) Charles Odette − Sony Sugar
  - (Democratic Republic of the Congo) Felly Mulumba − Sofapaka
Midfielder of the Year
- **(Kenya) Ekaliana Ndolo − Sofapaka**
  - (Uganda) Geoffrey Kizito − Gor Mahia
  - (Kenya) Brian Osumba – Tusker
Managerial awards
Coach of the Year
- **(Kenya) Mike Muiruri – Chemelil Sugar**
  - (Uganda) Sam Timbe – Sofapaka
  - (Kenya) Robert Matano − Ulinzi Stars
Team manager of the Year
- **(Kenya) William Muluya – Mathare United**
  - (Kenya) Amenipa Bigisho – Sofapaka
  - (Kenya) George Maina − Tusker
Chairman's Award
- **(Kenya) Ronald Ngala**
Referee awards
Referee of the Year^{[2]}
- **Peter Waweru**
  - Anthony Ogwayo
  - Moses Osano
Assistant referee of the Year
- **Steven Oduor**
  - Dorcas Wanza
  - Oliver Omondi

=== 2015 ===
The 2015 KPL Awards were held on 9 December 2015 at the Safari Park Hotel in Nairobi. 12 categories were handled at the event.

Player and team awards
Player of the Year
- **(Kenya) Michael Olunga − Gor Mahia**
Young Player of the Year^{[1]}
- **(Kenya) George Mandela – Muhoroni Youth**
  - (Liberia) Ebrima Sanneh − Nairobi City Stars
  - (Kenya) Alphonse Ndonye − Mathare United
Fair Play Player of the Year
- **(Kenya) John Baraza − Sofapaka**
  - (Kenya) Vincent Nyaberi − Thika United
  - (Kenya) Alfred Onyango − Sony Sugar
Fair Play Team of the Year
- **Western Stima**
  - Mathare United
  - Sony Sugar
Golden Boot
- **(Kenya) Jesse Were − Tusker**
  - (Kenya) Michael Olunga – Gor Mahia
  - (Kenya) John Mark Makwatta – Ulinzi Stars
Goalkeeper of the Year
- **(Kenya) Boniface Oluoch − Gor Mahia**
  - (Kenya) Faruk Shikalo − Muhoroni Youth
  - (Kenya) Jairus Adira − Chemelil Sugar
Defender of the Year
- **(Burundi) Karim Nizigiyimana − Gor Mahia**
  - (Kenya) Musa Mohamed − Gor Mahia
  - (Kenya) Geoffrey Kokoyo − Ulinzi Stars
Midfielder of the Year
- **(Kenya) Eric Johana Omondi − Mathare United**
  - (Uganda) Khalid Aucho − Gor Mahia
  - (Kenya) Bernard Mang'oli – A.F.C. Leopards
Managerial awards
Coach of the Year
- **(Scotland) Frank Nutall – Gor Mahia**
  - (Kenya) Robert Matano − Ulinzi Stars
  - (Kenya) Twahir Muhiddin – Bandari
Team manager of the Year
- **(Kenya) Moses Nyalik – Western Stima**
  - (Kenya) Jolawi Abondo – Gor Mahia
  - (Kenya) David Mwangi – Ulinzi Stars
  - (Kenya) Neville Pudo − Nairobi City Stars
Referee awards
Referee of the Year^{[2]}
- **Raymond Onyango**
  - Judith Muhonja
  - Michael Iluve
Assistant referee of the Year
- **Stephen Adeya**
  - Judy Wamaro
  - Beth Wambui

== Notes ==
- 1 The Young Player of the Year award is given to players at the age of 20 or under and is often also called the New Player of the Year or the New Young Player award.
- 2 The Referee of the Year award is more commonly known as the Centre Referee of the Year award to avoid confusion with other official positions (assistant referee, etc.) All officials participating in the Kenyan Premier League are under the Football Kenya Federation and all have Kenyan nationality.
