= 2013 Kenyan Premier League =

Kenyan Premier League
- Season: 2013
- Champions: Gor Mahia; 1st Premier League title 13th Kenyan title overall
- Relegated: Kakamega Homeboyz; Karuturi Sports
- Champions League: Gor Mahia
- Confederation Cup: A.F.C. Leopards
- Top 8 Cup: A.F.C. Leopards; Bandari; Gor Mahia; KCB; Sofapaka; Thika United; Tusker; Ulinzi Stars
- Matches: 240
- Goals: 432 (1.8 per match)
- Top goalscorer: Jacob Keli (17 goals)
- Biggest home win: KCB 6–0 Muhoroni Youth (1 March 2013)
- Biggest away win: Kakamega Homeboyz 1 – 5 Tusker (23 June 2013)
- Highest scoring: KCB 6–0 Muhoroni Youth (1 March 2013); Sofapaka 4–2 Karuturi Sports (31 March 2013); Kakamega Homeboyz 1 – 5 Tusker (23 June 2013); Western Stima 4–2 Muhoroni Youth (14 September 2013)
- All statistics correct as of 9 November 2013. Note: Walkovers counted in matches played but not counted in goals scored.

The 2013 Kenyan Premier League (known as the Tusker Premier League for sponsorship reasons) was the tenth season of the Kenyan Premier League since it began in 2003, marking a decade of its existence. It was also the Golden Jubilee season of top division football in Kenya since 1963. It began on 24 February 2013 and ended on 9 November 2013. League champions Gor Mahia earned a place in the preliminary round of the 2014 CAF Champions League while 2013 FKF President's Cup champions A.F.C. Leopards earned a place in the preliminary round of the 2014 CAF Confederation Cup.

A total of 16 teams competed for the league, with fourteen returning from the 2012 season and one team from each of the two zones of FKF Division One. This was the first ever season for Kakamega Homeboyz in the top flight.

After beating Kakamega Homeboyz on 27 October, Gor Mahia won the Kenyan Premier League title for a joint record 13th time, matching the record set by their rivals A.F.C. Leopards in 1998. It was also Gor Mahia's first title since 1995.

== Changes from last season ==
Locations of the 2013 Kenyan Premier League teams.
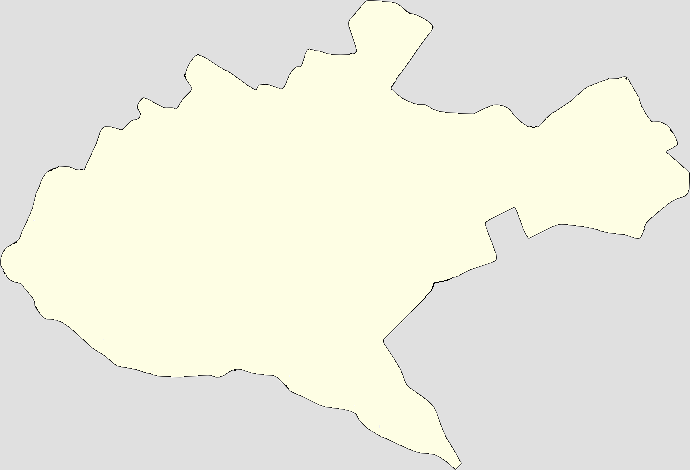
Locations of the 2013 Kenyan Premier League teams within Nairobi.

Relegated from Premier League

- Rangers
- Oserian

Promoted from Division One

- Bandari
- Kakamega Homeboyz

== Teams ==
Out of the 16 participating teams, 7 are based in the capital, Nairobi, while Bandari is the only team based at the Coast.

=== Stadia and locations ===
Team	Location	Stadium	Capacity
A.F.C. Leopards	Nairobi	Nyayo National Stadium	30,000
Bandari	Mombasa	Mombasa Municipal Stadium	10,000
Chemelil Sugar	Chemelil	Chemelil Sports Complex	5,000
Gor Mahia	Nairobi	Nairobi City Stadium	15,000
Kakamega Homeboyz	Kakamega	Bukhungu Stadium	5,000
Karuturi Sports	Naivasha	Naivasha Stadium	5,000
KCB	Nairobi	Nairobi City Stadium	15,000
Mathare United	Nairobi	Kasarani Stadium	60,000
Muhoroni Youth	Muhoroni	Muhoroni Stadium	5,000
Nairobi City Stars	Nairobi	Hope Centre	5,000
Sofapaka	Nairobi	Nyayo National Stadium	30,000
Sony Sugar	Awendo	Green Stadium	5,000
Thika United	Thika	Thika Municipal Stadium	5,000
Tusker	Nairobi	Kasarani Stadium	60,000
Ulinzi Stars	Nakuru	Afraha Stadium	8,200
Western Stima	Kakamega	Bukhungu Stadium	5,000

=== Head coaches ===
Team	Head coach
A.F.C. Leopards	(Kenya) James Nandwa
Bandari	(Kenya) Twahir Muhiddin
Chemelil Sugar	(Kenya) Mike Mururi
Gor Mahia	(Scotland) Bobby Williamson
Kakamega Homeboyz	(Kenya) Fred Serenge
Karuturi Sports	(Kenya) Michael Nam
Kenya Commercial Bank	(Kenya) Abdalla Juma
Mathare United	(Kenya) Stanley Okumbi
Muhoroni Youth	(Kenya) Alfred Imonje
Nairobi City Stars	(Netherlands) Jan Koops
Sofapaka	(Uganda) Sam Timbe
Sony Sugar	(Kenya) Sammy Omollo
Thika United	(Kenya) John Kamau
Tusker	(Kenya) Robert Matano
Ulinzi Stars	(Kenya) Salim Ali
Western Stima	(Kenya) Francis Baraza

==== Managerial changes ====
As of 20:27, 29 September 2013 (UTC+3).

Team	Outgoing manager	Manner of departure	Date of vacancy	Incoming manager	Date of appointment	Position in table
AFC Leopards	(Netherlands) Jan Koops	Sacked	22 November 2012	(Kenya) Tom Olaba	5 February 2013	End of 2012 season
AFC Leopards	(Kenya) Tom Olaba	Sacked	2 April 2013	(Belgium) Luc Eymael	10 April 2013	6th
AFC Leopards	(Belgium) Luc Eymael	Sacked	17 September 2013	(Kenya) James Nandwa	17 September 2013	7th
Gor Mahia	(Croatia) Zdravko Logarusić	Sacked	25 June 2013	(Scotland) Bobby Williamson	5 July 2013	3rd
Karuturi Sports	(Kenya) Michael Nam	Resigned	14 March 2013	(Kenya) James Omondi	3 April 2013	7th
KCB	(Kenya) James Omondi	Sacked	28 November 2012	(Kenya) Abdallah Juma	19 December 2012	End of 2012 season
Nairobi City Stars	(The Gambia) Bye Wadda	Resigned	10 June 2013	(Netherlands) Jan Koops	17 September 2013	11th
Sofapaka	(England) Stewart Hall	Resigned	30 October 2012	(Kenya) David Ouma	11 January 2013	End of 2012 season
Sofapaka	(Kenya) David Ouma	Demoted	27 August 2013	(Uganda) Sam Timbe	27 August 2013	3rd
Sony Sugar	(Kenya) Zedekiah Otieno	Resigned	November 2012	(Kenya) Sammy Omollo	14 December 2012	End of 2012 season
Sony Sugar	(Kenya) Sammy Omollo	Sacked	9 July 2013	(Kenya) Zedekiah Otieno	10 July 2013	13th
Ulinzi Stars	(Kenya) Sammy Simiyu	Demoted	25 December 2012	(Kenya) Salim Ali	25 December 2012	End of 2012 season
Western Stima	(Kenya) Henry Omino	End of contract	December 2012	(Kenya) Francis Baraza	28 December 2012	End of 2012 season

== League table ==
Pos	Team	Pld	W	D	L	GF	GA	GD	Pts	Qualification or relegation
1	Gor Mahia (C, Q)	30	17	9	4	32	15	+17	60	Qualification for 2014 CAF Champions League
2	A.F.C. Leopards (Q)	30	14	8	8	39	25	+14	50	Qualification for 2014 CAF Confederation Cup (Note: A.F.C. Leopards qualified for the 2014 CAF Confederation Cup as winners of the 2013 FKF President's Cup.)
3	Sofapaka	30	13	11	6	35	22	+13	50	
4	Kenya Commercial Bank	30	11	14	5	40	22	+18	47	
5	Tusker	30	10	12	8	30	23	+7	42	
6	Bandari	30	10	12	8	30	28	+2	42	
7	Thika United	30	11	9	10	27	31	−4	42	
8	Ulinzi Stars	30	10	11	9	22	21	+1	41	
9	Chemelil Sugar	30	10	10	10	27	24	+3	40	
10	Muhoroni Youth	30	9	8	13	21	40	−19	35	
11	SoNy Sugar	30	7	13	10	19	28	−9	34	
12	Western Stima	30	6	14	10	23	25	−2	32	
13	Mathare United	30	5	17	8	24	27	−3	32	
14	Nairobi City Stars	30	7	11	12	24	36	−12	32	
15	Kakamega Homeboyz (R)	30	6	11	13	22	29	−7	29	Relegation to 2014 National Super League
16	Vegpro (R)	30	4	10	16	17	36	−19	22	Relegation to 2014 National Super League

Updated to match(es) played on 9 November 2013. Source: Kenyan Premier League
Rules for classification: 1) points; 2) goal difference; 3) number of goals scored.
(C) Champions; (Q) Qualified for the phase indicated; (R) Relegated

=== Positions by round ===
The table lists the positions of teams after each week of matches. In order to preserve chronological evolvements, any postponed matches are not included to the round at which they were originally scheduled, but added to the full round they were played immediately afterwards. For example, if a match is scheduled for matchday 13, but then postponed and played between days 16 and 17, it will be added to the standings for day 16.

Team ╲ Round	1	2	3	4	5	6	7	8	9	10	11	12	13	14	15	16	17	18	19	20	21	22	23	24	25	26	27	28	29	30
Gor Mahia	10	13	9	12	14	11	11	10	11	5	5	5	7	3	3	2	1	1	1	1	1	1	1	1	1	1	1	1	1	1
A.F.C. Leopards	6	8	12	6	8	7	6	8	9	12	12	9	11	10	10	9	5	3	3	3	3	6	7	5	3	3	2	2	2	2
Sofapaka	5	2	6	7	7	5	3	2	1	1	2	2	2	4	6	6	3	6	9	7	4	2	2	2	2	2	3	3	3	3
Kenya Commercial Bank	1	1	1	1	1	1	1	1	4	2	3	4	6	6	4	4	4	7	4	8	7	5	3	4	4	4	4	4	4	4
Tusker	11	14	15	15	15	12	13	15	7	8	9	10	9	7	9	8	9	8	5	6	8	7	4	6	5	5	6	5	7	5
Bandari	13	11	11	5	4	6	5	7	5	4	4	6	3	2	2	3	6	9	6	4	6	8	9	8	9	6	5	6	5	6
Thika United	12	5	2	4	3	2	2	3	2	3	1	1	1	1	1	1	2	2	2	2	5	3	5	3	7	8	8	7	8	7
Ulinzi Stars	4	3	5	8	5	8	8	5	3	6	6	7	4	5	8	10	10	4	7	5	2	4	6	7	6	7	7	8	6	8
Chemelil Sugar	7	7	4	3	2	4	7	4	6	7	7	3	5	8	5	5	8	5	8	9	9	9	8	9	8	9	9	9	9	9
Muhoroni Youth	3	6	3	2	6	3	4	6	8	11	11	13	15	15	15	14	14	13	11	12	12	14	14	12	13	11	12	11	10	10
SoNy Sugar	8	10	14	14	16	16	16	14	14	16	16	15	13	13	12	13	13	14	14	14	14	13	13	14	12	14	14	15	14	11
Western Stima	15	12	7	10	9	9	9	11	10	10	10	11	10	11	11	11	12	11	12	11	11	11	10	11	11	12	11	12	11	12
Mathare United	9	9	13	16	13	14	12	12	13	14	13	14	12	12	13	12	11	12	13	13	13	12	12	13	14	13	13	13	12	13
Nairobi City Stars	16	16	16	11	11	10	10	9	12	9	8	8	8	9	7	7	7	10	10	10	10	10	11	10	10	10	10	10	13	14
Kakamega Homeboyz	2	4	8	13	12	15	15	16	15	15	15	16	16	16	16	15	15	15	15	15	15	15	15	15	15	15	15	14	15	15
Vegpro	14	15	10	9	10	13	14	13	16	13	14	12	14	14	14	16	16	16	16	16	16	16	16	16	16	16	16	16	16	16

Leader
Relegation to the 2014 Kenyan National Super League

Updated to match(es) played on 9 November 2013. Source: Futaa.com
Notes: Top 8 teams qualified for the 2014 KPL Top 8 Cup

== Results ==
Home \ Away	AFC	BND	CHM	GOR	KHB	VGP	KCB	MAU	MHY	NCS	SOF	SNY	THU	TUS	ULS	WST
A.F.C. Leopards		0–0	1–3	0–1	2–1	1–0	0–0	2–0	3–0	1–1	1–0	0–0	1–1	1–1	1–0	1–0
Bandari	2–1		2–0	0–1	2–1	1–0	1–0	0–0	2–1	2–2	2–1	3–0	1–1	0–0	1–1	1–1
Chemelil Sugar	1–1	2–0		0–2	1–0	2–0	1–1	1–1	3–1	1–0	0–0	0–0	2–0	0–1	0–1	0–0
Gor Mahia	2–2	0–0	1–0		1–0	2–1	2–1	1–0	3–0	0–0	1–0	1–1	0–0	0–1	0–2	2–0
Kakamega Homeboyz	0–3	2–3	2–0	0–0		3–1	1–1	1–0	0–0	0–0	0–1	4–1	2–0	1–5	0–0	1–0
Vegpro	3–2	1–0	0–0	1–2	0–0		0–2	0–0	0–0	1–2	0–0	0–0	0–1	0–0	1–3	1–1
Kenya Commercial Bank	0–1	2–0	0–0	2–0	2–1	1–0		2–2	6–0	4–0	1–1	3–2	0–1	1–1	2–0	1–0
Mathare United	1–0	1–1	1–1	1–2	1–1	2–0	2–2		1–1	2–2	1–2	0–0	0–1	1–0	1–1	2–1
Muhoroni Youth	2–1	0–1	1–1	0–2	0–0	1–0	0–0	1–0		0–2	1–0	1–1	0–2	0–3	2–1	2–0
Nairobi City Stars	2–1	1–1	1–2	0–0	1–0	1–2	0–2	1–0	0–1		1–3	2–1	0–1	0–1	0–1	0–0
Sofapaka	0–3	3–2	2–1	0–1	0–0	4–2	2–0	1–1	2–1	3–0		0–0	1–0	1–1	3–0	0–0
SoNy Sugar	0–1	2–0	0–2	0–2	0–0	1–0	1–1	0–0	0–1	0–0	0–2		1–1	1–0	1–0	2–1
Thika United	1–4	0–0	2–1	1–2	2–1	3–0	0–0	1–1	1–0	2–0	2–3	0–1		2–1	0–1	0–0
Tusker	2–1	2–1	1–2	0–0	1–0	1–1	0–0	0–0	1–2	2–3	0–0	2–3	1–1		0–0	1–0
Ulinzi Stars	0–1	1–0	1–0	0–0	0–0	0–2	2–2	1–2	0–0	0–0	0–0	1–0	3–0	1–0		1–1
Western Stima	1–2	1–1	1–0	2–1	1–0	0–0	1–1	0–0	4–2	2–2	0–0	0–0	4–0	0–1	1–0	

Updated to match(es) played on 9 November 2013. Source: Kenyan Premier League
Legend: Blue = home team win; Yellow = draw; Red = away team win.

== Top scorers ==
Rank	Player	Club	Goals
1	(Kenya) Jacob Keli	Kenya Commercial Bank	17
2	(Kenya) Jesse Were	Tusker	15
3	(Kenya) Allan Wanga	A.F.C. Leopards	11
4	(Kenya) Clifford Alwanga	Kenya Commercial Bank	9
5	(Kenya) Moses Arita	Tusker / Sony Sugar	8
5	(Kenya) John Baraza	Sofapaka	8
5	(Uganda) Dan Sserunkuma	Gor Mahia	8
8	(Kenya) Andrew Murunga	Karuturi Sports / Tusker	6
8	(Kenya) Dennis Onkangi	Western Stima	6
10	(Kenya) Shaban Kenga	Bandari	5
10	(Kenya) Jared Obwoge	Chemelil Sugar	5
10	(Kenya) Ezekiel Odera	Thika United	5
10	(Kenya) Eric Okoth	Bandari	5
10	(Kenya) Dennis Omino	Thika United	5
10	(Kenya) Rama Salim	Gor Mahia	5
10	(Kenya) Noah Wafula	A.F.C. Leopards	5
10	(Kenya) Kenneth Wendo	Mathare United	5

Last updated: 9 November 2013

== See also ==
- 2013 Kenyan Women's Premier League
- 2013 FKF President's Cup
- 2013 KPL Top 8 Cup
- 2013 Kenyan Super Cup (pre-season)
- 2013 Kenyan Super Cup (post-season)
