= 2024–25 Kenyan Premier League =

Kenyan Premier League
- Season: 2024–25
- Dates: 24 August 2024 – 22 June 2025
- Champions: Kenya Police
- Relegated: Bidco United; Posta Rangers
- CAF Champions League: Kenya Police
- CAF Confederation Cup: Nairobi United
- Matches: 234
- Goals: 472 (2.02 per match)
- Top goalscorer: Moses Shumah (17 goals)
- Biggest home win: Mara Sugar 3–0 Kakamega Homeboyz (25 August)
- Biggest away win: Mathare United 0–4 AFC Leopards (25 August)
- Highest scoring: KCB 4–3 Mara Sugar (21 December)
- All statistics correct as of 18 April 2025.

The 2024–25 Kenyan Premier League was the 22nd season of the Kenyan Premier League since it began in 2003, and the 62nd season of top-division football in Kenya since 1963. The season began on 24 August 2024 and concluded on 22 June 2025.

== Teams ==
=== Changes from previous season ===
==== Promotion and relegation ====
▲ Promoted from 2023–24 National Super League	▼ Relegated to 2024–25 National Super League
Mara Sugar; Mathare United	Muhoroni Youth; Nzoia Sugar

=== Stadiums and locations ===
Location of 2024-25 Kenyan Premier League teams

Team	Coach	Location	Stadium	Capacity
A.F.C. Leopards	(Kenya) Fred Ambani	Nairobi	Dandora Stadium	4,000
Bandari	(Kenya) Kennedy Odhiambo	Mombasa	Mombasa Municipal Stadium	10,000
Bidco United F.C.	(Kenya) Anthony Akhulia	Thika	Thika Municipal Stadium	20,000
Gor Mahia	(Croatia) Sinisa Mihic	Nairobi	Kenyatta Stadium	5,000
Kakamega Homeboyz	(Kenya) Francis Baraza	Kakamega	Bukhungu Stadium	5,000
Kariobangi Sharks	(Kenya) William Muluya	Nairobi	Kenyatta Stadium	5,000
Kenya Commercial Bank	(Kenya) Patrick Odhiambo	Nairobi	SportPesa Arena	5,000
Kenya Police	(Burundi) Etienne Ndayiragije	Nairobi	Police Sacco Stadium	3,000
Mara Sugar	(Kenya) Benedict Simiyu	Sare-Awendo	Awendo Green Stadium	5,000
Mathare United	(Kenya) John Kamau	Nairobi	Dandora Stadium	4,000
Murang'a Seal	(Kenya) John Njogu	Murang'a	SportPesa Arena	5,000
Nairobi City Stars	(Kenya) Salim Babu	Nairobi	Kenyatta Stadium	5,000
Posta Rangers	(Kenya) Sammy Omollo	Nairobi	Kenyatta Stadium	5,000
Shabana	(Kenya) Peter Okidi	Kisii	Gusii Stadium	12,000
Sofapaka	(Kenya) Ezekiel Akwana	Nairobi	Kenyatta Stadium	5,000
Talanta	(Kenya) Jackline Juma	Nairobi	Kenyatta Stadium	5,000
Tusker	(Kenya) Charles Okere	Nairobi	Kenyatta Stadium	5,000
Ulinzi Stars	(Kenya) Danstun Nyaudo	Nakuru	Lang'ata Sports Complex	8,200

== League table ==
Pos	Team	Pld	W	D	L	GF	GA	GD	Pts	Promotion, qualification or relegation
1	Kenya Police (C, Q)	34	18	11	5	38	17	+21	65	Qualification to CAF Champions League qualifying first round
2	Gor Mahia	34	16	11	7	47	24	+23	59	
3	Kakamega Homeboyz	34	15	13	6	39	27	+12	58	
4	Tusker	34	15	12	7	41	36	+5	57	
5	Shabana	34	14	11	9	41	29	+12	53	
6	AFC Leopards	34	12	15	7	41	28	+13	51	
7	Sofapaka	34	11	13	10	37	28	+9	46	
8	Bandari	34	10	14	10	26	30	−4	44	
9	KCB	34	10	12	12	36	35	+1	42	
10	Mathare United	34	10	12	12	26	40	−14	42	
11	Kariobangi Sharks	34	8	16	10	29	29	0	40	
12	Ulinzi Stars	34	8	14	12	29	33	−4	38	
13	Murang'a SEAL	34	9	10	15	25	40	−15	37	
14	Mara Sugar	34	8	12	14	34	41	−7	36	
15	Bidco United	34	7	14	13	21	32	−11	35	
16	Talanta	34	9	8	17	33	46	−13	35	Qualification for Relegation Play-Offs
17	Posta Rangers (R)	34	8	11	15	36	49	−13	35	Relegation to Kenyan National Super League
18	Nairobi City Stars (R)	34	8	11	15	26	41	−15	35	Relegation to Kenyan National Super League

Source: Flashscore
Rules for classification: 1) Points; 2) Goal difference; 3) Number of goals scored; 4) Head-to-head results; 5) Wins; 6) Away goals; 7) Penalty points (sec 9.5); 8) 12-point sending off offences
(C) Champions; (Q) Qualified for the phase indicated; (R) Relegated

== Results ==
Each team plays each other twice (34 matches each), once at home and once away.

Home \ Away	AFC	BAN	BID	GOR	KKH	KAR	KCB	KEP	MAR	MAT	MUR	NAI	POS	SHA	SOF	TAL	TUS	ULI
AFC Leopards	—	2–0						1–0				2–1	0–1				4–1	
Bandari		—			0–1		1–1		1–0	2–2	0–0							
Bidco United	0–1		—			1–0		0–3		2–0			1–3	1–1		1–1		
Gor Mahia				—			0–0			4–0								
Kakamega Homeboyz					—	0–1				0–0		2–0						
Kariobangi Sharks	1–1					—		0–0			3–0						3–2	
KCB					4–1	0–0	—											1–0
Kenya Police				1–0	1–1		1–1	—	1–0	2–0		3–1	3–2				1–1	
Mara Sugar					3–0				—			1–0	1–1	1–0				
Mathare United	0–4		1–0							—					1–1			
Murang'a SEAL	1–0					0–0	0–2		1–1		—		1–0					
Nairobi City Stars		0–1	1–1									—			1–1			
Posta Rangers		1–1		0–3	1–1	0–1	0–3			0–2		2–1	—				1–3	1–2
Shabana								1–0					1–1	—	0–1		2–1	
Sofapaka		0–1		1–1				1–1							—	0–1		
Talanta		0–0						0–1					0–0	2–4		—		
Tusker		1–0	2–1		2–2					2–0		1–0			1–0	3–1	—	1–1
Ulinzi Stars		1–1						0–0			0–1			2–2				—

Updated to match(es) played on 20 April 2025. Source: Soccerway
Legend: Blue = home team win; Yellow = draw; Red = away team win.
For upcoming matches, an "a" indicates there is an article about the rivalry between the two participants.
