= Doreen Nabwire =

Kenyan footballer (born 1987)

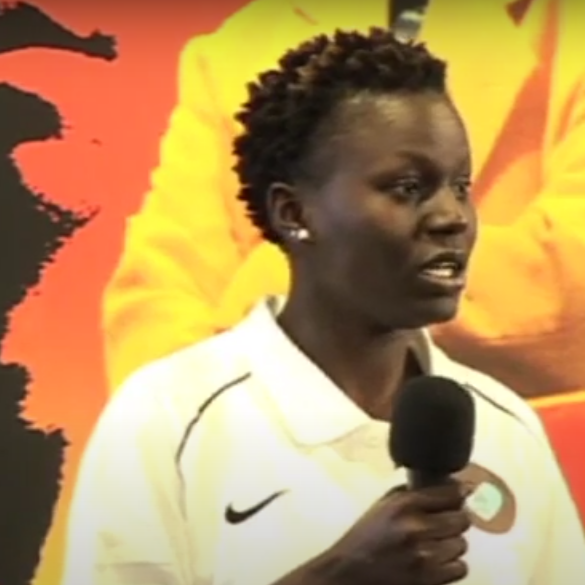
- Nabwire in Amsterdam in 2013

Personal information
- Full name: Doreen Nabwire Omondi
- Date of birth: 5 March 1987 (age 39)
- Place of birth: Korogocho, Nairobi, Kenya
- Height: 1.65 m (5 ft 5 in)
- Position: Midfielder

Senior career*
Years	Team	Apps	(Gls)
2002–2008	Mathare United Women		
2009–2010	Werder Bremen	18	(7)
2010–2011	PEC Zwolle	16	(1)
2011–2013	Matuu FC		(4)
2013–2014	1. FC Köln	1	(0)
2013–2014	1. FC Köln II	6	(1)

International career
2001–2016	Kenya		
- * Club domestic league appearances and goals

Doreen Nabwire Omondi (born 5 March 1987), nicknamed "Dodo", is a Kenyan former footballer. In 2009, Nabwire became the first Kenyan woman to play professional football in Europe. She also played and served as captain of the Kenya women's national football team. She played for FC Zwolle in de Eredivisie Vrouwen from 2010 to 2011.

Since 2016, she has been working as the Women's Football Development Officer and Director of Women's football for the Football Kenya Federation.

Nabwire co-founded a Community Based Organization (CBO) called Girls Unlimited in 2009, which uses a variety of sports to nurture and develop youths' talents to bring social change and development in communities in Kenya.

== Club career ==
=== Early career ===
“My mother believed that it's a man's game and did not want me to play,” Nabwire said. “I tried to do all my chores so I could play but she would say to me: ‘No Doreen you're not going anywhere’. One day we were due to play in a quarter-final match, I asked the whole team to come home and persuade her. They all came, but my mom said: ‘No.

— Dooren Nabwire on restrictions from her mother

Born in Ngomongo estate in Korogocho and grew up in Mathare Valley, one of Nairobi's largest slums, Doreen Nabwire grew up with her five siblings and parents. She attended Valley Bridge Primary School in Huruma and Maina Wanjigi High School in Eastleigh.

She started playing football on the streets at the age of ten and was discovered by players who noticed her talent and told her about a project being run by the Nobel Peace Prize nominated Mathare Youth Sports Association (MYSA) with the aim of empowering young people through football. She wanted to join the women's team of Mathare United, but she was held back by her mother who felt that women were not meant to play football. She was later allowed to join the North Villas, a football club in MYSA after her father intervened.

MYSA was being supported by the Norway Cup, the largest youth football tournament in the world which attracted over 1,000 teams. She was invited to trials for the MYSA team in 1998 and she made the team ahead of the tournament. From then onward, she was part of the team in three consecutive trips to the competition as a teenager. In 1999, she took part in the tournament for the first time with the U-14 team and later won in 2000 and 2001 as captain.

She was promoted to the senior women's Mathare team where she played from 2002 to 2009.

=== Werder Bremen, 2009–2010 ===
Nabwire joined SV Werder Bremen in the German second division in 2009. On 27 September 2009, during her debut during the opening match of the season, she scored a brace to take Bremen to 2–2 draw against Hamburger SV II. Her goal made her the first player to score for Werder Bremen in the 2. Bundesliga.

During her one-year period with the Bremen-based club she scored seven goals in eighteen games.

=== Zwolle, 2010–2011 ===
She was voted as the second best player of the team by the fans. In the summer of 2010, she transferred to PEC Zwolle in the Netherlands, who joined the Eredivisie Women that year. On 30 September 2010, she made her debut in a 3–0 loss to ADO Den Haag. The following league match on 4 October 2010, she scored her debut goal in a 3–2 loss to FC Utrecht. She only stayed for one season, played 16 matches and scored one goal before returning to her native Kenya. While in playing for Zwolle, she studied and earned the professional UEFA C coaching license.

=== MOYAS and Matuu FC, 2011–2013 ===
She returned to Kenya in July 2011 and joined MOYAS FC as a player coach and helped them to win the Kenya Super 8 League that year. She later joined Matuu FC and won the 2012 Kenyan Women's Premier League. In 2013, she became assistant coach of MOYAS FC.

=== 1. FC Köln, 2013–2014 ===
In November 2013, she returned to Germany for the 2013–2014 season, to sign for 1. FC Köln who were then in the second division. She played her only match for the club on 1 December 2013 when she was substituted in the 84th minute in the 2–1 loss to eventual league winners SC Sand. In February 2014, she suffered a ruptured achilles tendon which ended her season and her club career in Europe.

== International career ==
In 2006, she was a member of the squad that represented Kenya in the first ever Street Football World Cup in 2006 held in Berlin, Germany, leading them to the title. It was this tournament that exposed her to Europe and gave her the opportunity to feature for international clubs. In 2006, she captained the Kenya under-20 against Nigeria and also played in matches against Djibouti and Cameroon.

=== Senior national team ===
Nabwire played for the Kenya women's national football team and served as the skipper at one point. She made her debut for the team in 2001 at the age of 15 in a friendly match against Ethiopia, where she played 70 minutes before being taken off. In 2016, she doubled as a player and team manager for the team. She served in that role in September 2016 at the 2016 CECAFA Women's Championship where Kenya lost to Tanzania in the finals.

She was part of the Harambee Starlets squad that qualified for the 2016 Africa Women Cup of Nations (AWCON) in Cameroon for the first time in the country's history.

== Life after football ==
=== Managerial career ===
After retiring from playing football, Nabwire continued her involvement in football. She worked as a coach, while working with NGOs to improve women's football in Kenya. She also worked with a Premier League team.

From 2010 to 2011, while playing for FC Zwolle, she obtained the UEFA-C coaching license at the Landstede Sportcentrum in Zwolle. After returning to Kenya from the Netherlands, she became a trainer at the Nairobi-based National Youth Talent Academy. Nabwire also worked as a Player-coach specifically as an assistant coach for Matuu FC, which he helped in securing the 2012 Kenyan Women's Premier League. In March 2013, she left Matuu and worked as a trainer of FKF Girls Premier League club MOYAS Ladies.

Since 2016 she has been the team manager of the Kenyan women's national team Harambee Starlets, which qualified for the finals of the Africa Cup for the first time in April 2016. She currently holds the CAF B License after undergoing the CAF training course in September 2020 in Kenya.

=== Football Kenya Federation ===
Since 2016, she had been holding a key administrative role at the Football Kenya Federation including working as the Women's Football Development Officer and Director of Women's football. With this, her role includes, heading the women's desk at the federation, managing and running the Women's leagues and developing and implementing grassroots women football activities. She also doubles as the Football Kenya Federation (FKF)'s Deputy Competitions Manager. In July 2021, she led the federation to launch a women's football strategy to grow women's football in Kenya.

=== FIFA ===
In November 2019, Nabwire was one of the 24 women from FIFA's 211 member associations who graduated from the FIFA-UEFA Women in Football Leadership Programme. In October 2021, she was appointed unto FIFA's technical advisory group on the growth and advancement of women's football. The grouped is headed by Jill Ellis and has fellow African Asisat Oshoala also as a member.

== Personal life ==
=== Family life ===
Nabwire comes from a footballing family. She is the third of a family of six. Her brother Eric Johana Omondi plays for Jönköpings Södra and previously played for Mathare United, while Felix Oucho also played for Mathare United and is currently a coach at a club in Busia. Her other brother, Anthony Kadudu featured for Tusker FC while her younger sister, Christine Nafula is a footballer who plays for the Kenya women's national team. She has three sons.

=== Girls Unlimited ===
In 2009, she co-founded Girls Unlimited, a Community Based Organization (CBO) which uses a variety of sports including football, tennis, volleyball and netball to nurture and develop youths' talents to bring social change and development in communities in Kenya. The organization targets girls in primary and secondary schools within Kenyan communities and empowers them by teaching life skills, decision making and ways to improve their confidence. Since 2015, the organization has been organizing an annual women's football tournament dubbed the Dada Football Tournament to promote women's football in Kenya.

=== Other activities ===
Nabwire is an avid Manchester United fan. A documentary of her life titled Dodo – between corrugated iron and the world stage – ("Zwischen Wellblech und Weltbühne") by German journalist and documentary filmmaker Herbert Ostwald was released in 2009 at the 6th International Football Film Festival 11mm in Berlin. Excerpts of the documentary were shown on Deutsche Welle. Nabwire published her autobiography in January 2011, titled Traumpass which was co-authored with Herbert Ostwald.

Nabwire holds a diploma in Tours, Travel, and Cabin Crew and has worked at the Phoenix Safaris, Kenya in the past.

== Career statistics ==
Appearances and goals by club, season and competition
Club	Season	League		
Club	Season	Division	Apps	Goals
Werder Bremen	2009–10	2. Bundesliga	18	7
FC Zwolle	2010–11	Eredivisie	16	1
1. FC Köln	2013–14	2. Bundesliga	1	0
Total			35	8

== Honours ==
MYSA

- Norway Cup U14: 2000, 2001

MOYAS

- Kenya Super 8 League: 2011

Matuu FC

- Kenyan Women's Premier League: 2012

Kenya

- Street Football World Cup: 2006
- CECAFA Women's Championship runner-up: 2016

Individual

- Norway Cup U14 Best Player: 2000, 2001
- Magharibi Michezo Awards Football Personality of the Decade: 2018

=== Awards and recognition ===
In 2007, Nabwire was selected as Kenya's Football for Hope Ambassador and served as a representative for her country during the 2010 FIFA World Cup in South Africa.

== See also ==
- List of Kenya women's international footballers
- List of players of PEC Zwolle (women)
