= David Kwalimwa =

Kenyan journalist (born 1983)

David Shikami Kwalimwa
- Born: 17 May 1983 (age 41)
- Occupation: Multimedia Sports Journalist
- Known for: Sports reporting, analysis
- Title: Journalist

David Shikami Kwalimwa is a Kenyan multimedia sports journalist who currently works for the Nation Media Group. He previously worked at Sports TV in Uganda, K24 TV, Kiss TV as a sports producer and as a reporter for Goal.

== Awards ==
He was named the television presenter of the year at the Footballer of the Year Awards (FOYA) at the 2011 KPL Awards.
