= 2012 Kenyan Women's Premier League =

Kenyan Women's Premier League
- Season: 2012
- Champions: Matuu
- Relegated: Kamaliza Eaglets; Sotik Super Stars
- Matches: 132
- Goals: 536 (4.06 per match)
- Top goalscorer: Millicent Mwanzi (31 goals)
- Biggest home win: MOYAS Ladies 14–0 Sotik Super Stars (12 May 2012); Mathare United 14–0 Sotik Super Stars (21 July 2012); Matuu 14–0 Sotik Super Stars (19 August 2012)
- Biggest away win: Makolanders 0–7 Matuu (21 July 2012)
- Highest scoring: MOYAS Ladies 14–0 Sotik Super Stars (12 May 2012); Mathare United 14–0 Sotik Super Stars (21 July 2012); Matuu 14–0 Sotik Super Stars (19 August 2012)

The 2012 Kenyan Women's Premier League began on 3 March and ended on 23 September. The Kenyan Women's Premier League (also known as the FKF Girls' Premier League) is the top tier women's football league in Kenya. It is controlled by the Football Kenya Federation.

Matuu clinched the title on 6 October 2012 after being awarded a walkover away at Kamaliza Eaglets, who are to be relegated at the end of the season with Sotik Super Stars. Millicent Mwanzi of third-placed Old Is Gold took the Golden Boot having scored the league best of 31 goals.

== League table ==
Pos	Team	Pld	W	D	L	GF	GA	GD	Pts	Qualification or relegation
1	Matuu (C)	22	19	1	2	99	22	+77	58	
2	MOYAS Ladies	22	19	0	3	78	17	+61	57	
3	Old Is Gold	22	17	2	3	81	22	+59	53	
4	Kisii United	22	12	2	8	54	26	+28	38	
5	Spedag	22	12	2	8	37	32	+5	38	
6	Mathare United	22	11	2	9	55	24	+31	35	
7	Thika Queens	22	9	6	7	39	31	+8	33	
8	Western Commando	22	9	1	12	38	49	−11	28	
9	Galactico Youth	22	3	7	12	20	48	−28	16	
10	Makolanders	22	4	4	14	26	59	−33	16	
11	Kamaliza Eaglets (R)	22	1	2	19	13	86	−73	5	Relegation to 2013 FKF Women's Division One
12	Sotik Super Stars (R)	22	1	1	20	8	132	−124	4	Relegation to 2013 FKF Women's Division One

Updated to match(es) played on 7 October 2012. Source: FKF Girls' Premier League
Rules for classification: 1) points; 2) goal difference; 3) number of goals scored.
(C) Champions; (R) Relegated

== Results ==
Home \ Away	GCO	KML	KSU	MLD	MAU	MTU	MYS	OIG	STK	SDG	THQ	WCD
Galactico Youth		1–1	1–1	2–2	0–1	1–3	0–2	2–3	3–0	1–2	0–2	0–0
Kamaliza Eaglets	1–4		5–0	0–6	1–3	0–2 (Note: Matuu were handed a walkover with 3 points and 2 goals after Kamaliza Eaglets failed to turn up for the match.)	1–3	0–2	2–0	0–4	0–3	0–3
Kisii United	3–0	1–1		2–0	1–0	2–3	0–2	2–3	4–0	0–0	4–0	4–0
Makolanders	0–0	2–2	0–2		1–3	0–7	0–5	1–2	7–0	0–1	1–1	1–0
Mathare United	3–0	3–0	3–2	3–0		0–1	2–3	0–3	14–0	3–0	1–1	5–0
Matuu	7–1	11–1	3–1	6–0	2–0		5–0	2–2	14–0	6–0	4–1	4–0
MOYAS Ladies	6–0	13–0	2–1	4–0	2–0	3–0		0–1	14–0	3–0	2–0	3–0
Old Is Gold	7–0	5–0	1–3	7–1	1–0	3–1	1–2		12–1	3–1	2–0	7–1
Sotik Super Stars	1–0	4–1	0–4	1–2	0–6	0–4	1–3	0–11		0–2	0–3	0–7
Spedag	2–0	3–1	3–2	3–0	2–1	2–4	2–1	1–2	5–0		1–1	2–0
Thika Queens	1–1	2–0	2–1	3–0	1–1	2–3	1–2	3–3	7–0	1–0		4–1
Western Commando	0–2	2–1	1–5	5–1	3–0	3–7	2–3	1–0	3–0	2–0	4–0	

Updated to match(es) played on 7 October 2012. Source: Kenyan Women's Premier League
Legend: Blue = home team win; Yellow = draw; Red = away team win.

== Top scorers ==
Rank	Player	Club	Goals
1	(Kenya) Millicent Mwanzi	Old Is Gold	31
2	(Kenya) Esse Akida	Matuu	30
2	(Kenya) Mildred Cheche	MOYAS Ladies	30
4	(Kenya) Janet Nyaboke	Mathare United	21
5	(Kenya) Ramadhan Shagilah	Kisii United	20
6	(Kenya) Mary Kinuthia	Matuu	19
7	(Kenya) Clare Wanga	Makolanders	17
8	(Kenya) Elizabeth Mwikali	MOYAS Ladies	14
9	(Kenya) Winnie Mugeci	Mathare United	11
9	(Kenya) Jackline Akoth	MOYAS Ladies	11

Last updated: 7 October 2012

== See also ==
- 2012 Kenyan Premier League
