= Stephen Ocholla =

Kenyan football manager

Stephen Ocholla (born 2 April 1983) is a retired Kenyan footballer who turned out for Kenyan Premier League sides Thika United and Ulinzi Stars and Kenya between 2010 and 2014.

He currently serves as the interim head coach of his former club Ulinzi Stars after taking over from Dunstan Nyaudo in October 2025. He once held the position for six months from June 2021 before being replaced by Benjamin Nyangweso in February 2022.
