= Christine Nafula =

Kenyan footballer (born 1991)

Personal information
- Full name: Christine Nafula
- Date of birth: 10 November 1991 (age 34)
- Place of birth: Busia, Kenya
- Position: Midfielder

Team information
- Current team: Elpides Irodotou

Youth career
- 2000–2008: MYSA

Senior career*
Years	Team	Apps	(Gls)
2008–2012	Mathare United		
2012–2016	Matuu		
2016	Thika Queens		
2016–2018	Gaspo		
2018	Makolanders		
2018–2019	Dalhem		
2019–2020	Makolanders		
2020–2021	AEL		
2021–2022	Vihiga Queens		
2022–2023	Kayserispor	10	(1)
2023–2024	Kastoria	26	(12)
2024–2025	Kenya Police Bullets		
2025	Brera Tiverija	10	(9)
2026–	Irodotos	8	(8)

International career
2012–	Kenya		
- * Club domestic league appearances and goals as of 22 June 2026

Christine Nafula (born 10 November 1991) is a Kenyan football midfielder, who plays for Irodotos in the Greek second division. She has been a member of the Kenya women's national team.

== Family life ==
Nafula comes from a footballing family. She is a younger daughter of a family of six. Her brother Eric Johanna Omondi plays for UTA Arad and previously played for Mathare United, while Felix Oucho also played for Mathare United and is currently a coach at a club in Busia. Her other brother, Anthony Kadudu featured for Tusker FC whilst her elder sister, Doreen Nabwire is a former footballer for the Kenya women's national team.

== Club career ==
By March 2022, Nafula moved to Turkey, and signed with Kayseri Kadın FK to play in the second half of the 2021–22 Super League season. She scored one goal in ten matches capped.

== International career ==
Nafula played for Kenya national team at the 2016 Africa Women Cup of Nations. At the time, her sister was the team manager.

== See also ==
- List of Kenya women's international footballers
