= Moses Shumah =

Kenyan footballer (born 2002)

Personal information
- Full name: Moses Shumah
- Date of birth: 27 October 2002 (age 24)
- Place of birth: Kenya
- Position: Striker

Team information
- Current team: Power Dynamos

Youth career
- –: –

Senior career*
Years	Team	Apps	(Gls)
2022–2025	Kakamega Homeboyz	60	(24)
2025–	Power Dynamos	0	(0)

International career^{‡}
2023–	Kenya	6	(1)
- * Club domestic league appearances and goals ‡ National team caps and goals as of 16 June 2026

Moses Shumah (born 2002) is a Kenyan professional footballer who plays as a centre forward for Zambian Premier League club Power Dynamos and the Kenyan national team.

== Career ==
Shumah joined Homeboyz in November 2022 and went on to grow in stature under a number of coaches to finally become the Golden boot winner at the end of the 2024-25 Kenyan Premier League season with 17 goals.

He made a swift move thereafter to Zambian side Power Dynamos at a time Kenya's national team coach Benni McCarthy had named him to the Kenya team to lead his attack during the upcoming 2024 African Nations Championship that kicks off across East Africa in August 2025. The move away from the Kenyan league renders him ineligible for the tournament.

== International career ==
Shumah made his Kenya national team debut in June 2023, scoring on debut in a 1–0 win over Pakistan in a four-nation tournament in Mauritius.

=== International goals ===
Scores and results list Kenya's goal tally first.

No.	Date	Venue	Opponent	Score	Result	Competition
1.	14 June 2023	Complexe Sportif de Côte d'Or, Saint Pierre, Mauritius	Pakistan	1–0	1–0	2023 Mauritius Four Nations Cup

== Style of play ==
Shumah is known for strong hold-up play, intelligent off-ball movement, high pressing, and clinical finishing—with only one penalty in his 17-goal campaign in the 2024-25 Kenyan Premier League season. At some point he had a 96% passing accuracy, frequently occupying defenders to create space, and to win aerial duels.
