= Kevin Kimani =

Kenyan footballer (born 1989)

Personal information
- Full name: Kevin Kiruthi-Kimani
- Date of birth: 12 June 1989 (age 37)
- Place of birth: Nairobi, Kenya
- Height: 1.84 m (6 ft 1/2 in)
- Position: Midfielder

Team information
- Current team: Wazito

Senior career*
| Years | Team | Apps | (Gls) |
| 2008–2010 | Kenya Commercial Bank | | |
| 2010–2012 | Mathare United | | |
| 2012–2013 | Bocholter | 8 | (0) |
| 2013–2014 | Fostiras | 9 | (0) |
| 2014–2016 | Tusker | | |
| 2016 | Jomo Cosmos | 0 | (0) |
| 2017 | AFC Leopards | 0 | (0) |
| 2017 | Al-Hazem | | |
| 2018 | Sofapaka | | |
| 2018–2020 | Mathare United | | |
| 2020– | Wazito | | |

International career^{‡}
| 2011– | Kenya | 21 | (0) |
- * Club domestic league appearances and goals ‡ National team caps and goals as of 17:05, 24 September 2020 (UTC)

Kevin Kiruthi-Kimani (born 12 June 1989) is a Kenyan footballer who plays as a midfielder for Wazito.

== Club career ==
Kimani began his career in Kenya with Kenya Commercial Bank, prior to a spell with Mathare United. Kimani left Kenyan football for Belgian football in 2012 as he joined Belgian Third Division team Bocholter, he participated in eight fixtures for them before leaving in 2013 to sign for Greek Football League club Fostiras. After nine appearances for Fostiras, he left in 2014 to return to Kenya and join Tusker. Short spells with South African team Jomo Cosmos and Kenyan side AFC Leopards followed in 2016 and 2017 respectively. After only a few weeks with AFC Leopards, Kimani joined Saudi First Division side Al-Hazem.

He terminated his contract with Al-Hazem on 4 June 2017. During his time with Al-Hazem, Kimani scored one goal in a First Division win against eventual champions Al-Fayha on 8 April. On 31 January 2018, Kimani joined Sofapaka of the Kenyan Premier League. He scored his first goal for Sofapaka on 28 February during a 2–1 home victory over former team AFC Leopards. Kimani was released in November, having netted three goals in the 2018 season. Kimani rejoined ex-club Mathare United on 5 December. He departed in August 2020, subsequently joining Wazito.

== International career ==
Kimani has represented the Kenyan national team on twenty-one occasions, with his debut coming in 2011 in a 2014 FIFA World Cup qualifier against the Seychelles.

== Career statistics ==
As of 24 September 2020.

| National team | Year | Apps | Goals |
|---|---|---|---|
Kenya
| Kenya | 2010 | 1 | 0 |
| Kenya | 2011 | 5 | 0 |
| Kenya | 2012 | 4 | 0 |
| Kenya | 2015 | 7 | 0 |
| Kenya | 2019 | 4 | 0 |
| Total | | 21 | 0 |

== Honours ==
=== Club ===
Tusker

- KPL Top 8 Cup: 2014

=== Individual ===
- Kenyan Player of the Year: 2011
