= Tom Olaba =

Kenyan Football Manager

Tom Olaba is a former Kenyan footballer and international striker who was in charge of the Kenya National team in the year 2006.

Olaba coached clubs sides in Tanzania amongst them Mtibwa Sugar. and in 2013 he had a short stint as the coach of Kenyan premier league side AFC Leopards.
