= John Njogu =

Kenyan football manager

John Njogu Kamande
Personal information
- Full name: John Njogu Kamande

Managerial career
- Years: Team
- 2018: Thika United
- 2025: Muranga SEAL

John Njogu is a Kenyan football manager currently in the ranks of Kenyan Premier League side KCB FC as a trainer. His immediate past role was as the head coach of another Kenyan top flight side Muranga SEAL

== Career ==
Njogu previously coached the now defunct Kenyan premier league side Thika United.

When not coaching, Njogu recoils to politics where he serves as a Member of the County Assembly (MCA) for Gitothua Ward, Kiambu County.
