= Gideon Ochieng =

Kenyan footballer and coach (born 1967)

Personal information
- Date of birth: 22 April 1967 (age 59)

Managerial career
- Years: Team
- 2009: Gor Mahia (assistant coach)
- 2010: Gor Mahia
- 2011: Congo United
- 2011–2012: Nairobi City Stars

Gideon Agido Ochieng is a Kenyan football coach and former player who served as coach at Kenyan Premier League sides Gor Mahia Congo United, and Nairobi City Stars.

== Career ==
Gideon turned out as a fullback for Kenyan top-tier side Reunion F.C. in 1992, and Gor Mahia between 1992 and 1997.

After his playing career, Ochieng served Gor Mahia as Secretary General for two years from 2003. He joined the same team as an assistant coach in 2009 then stepped up to become the head coach upon the exit of Raphael Auka. In 2010 he relinquished his position mid-season to the technical director Zedekiah Otieno.

He joined Congo United for the 2010 season as head coach but lasted till April 2011 after a 4–0 loss to KCB. He then moved to Nairobi City Stars in August 2011 as a replacement for Kennedy Odhiambo on a caretaker basis before fully taking over for the 2012 season.
