= Nicholas Musonye =

Kenyan Football Administrator

- Born: Nicholas Musonye; Kenya
- Occupations: Football administrator, journalist
- Years active: 2000–2021 (CECAFA)
- Employer(s): CECAFA, Daily Nation (former)
- Known for: Former Secretary General of CECAFA
- Notable work: Oversaw CECAFA tournaments across East and Central Africa

Nicholas Musonye is a Kenyan football administrator now serving as the chairperson of Kenya's Local Organizing Committee (LOC) overseeing preparation for 2024 African Nations Championship and 2027 Africa Cup of Nations.

He is a former journalist who is best known for his long-standing role as the Secretary General of the Council for East and Central Africa Football Associations (CECAFA). He served in the position for over two decades, becoming one of the most influential figures in the development of football in East and Central Africa.

== Career ==
Musonye began his professional journey as a journalist with Kenya's Daily Nation newspaper, covering sports in the 1980s and 1990s. His extensive knowledge and passion for football led him to administrative roles, culminating in his appointment as CECAFA Secretary General in 2000.
