= Gabriel Njoroge =

Kenyan football manager

Personal information
- Date of birth: 8 August 1971 (age 55)
- Place of birth: Nairobi, Kenya
- Height: 1.74 m (5 ft 9 in)

Managerial career
- Years: Team
- 2005–2010: Mathare Youth
- 2011–2012: Mathare United
- 2015: Nairobi City Stars
- 2018: Thika United

Gabriel Kingi Njoroge is a former Kenyan Premier League football coach who handled Mathare Youth F.C., Mathare United, Nairobi City Stars, and Thika United and now in the ranks of Nairobi-based Vifaru Football Academy. He is a KNVB-trained coach and holder of UEFA 'B'as well as CAF 'C' License.

== Career ==
Njoroge was born in Kenya.

In 2006, Njoroge handled Kenya U-17 during the 2007 CECAFA U-17 Championship held in Burundi.

He coached Mathare Youth for a number of years till 2010. He was then appointed Mathare United coach in December 2011 on a two-year deal to replace Salim Ali. He was relieved of his duties after four months and was replaced by Stanley Okumbi in late Mar 2012. He then returned to Mathare Youth Sports Association. as a Technical Director and Youth Development and Talent Coordinator

In mid-2015 he joined Nairobi City Stars but parted ways with the club after less than five months in charge. In 2018 he landed at Thika United for a short stint.

== Honours ==
CECAFA U-17 Championship

(bronze) 2nd runners-up (Kenya U17): 2006

Mathare United

(gold) KPL U20 Champions: (Aug) 2016
(gold) KPL U20 Champions: (Dec) 2016
