= Jackline Juma =

Kenyan football manager

International career
Years	Team	Apps	(Gls)
- Kenya

Jackline Juma is a Kenyan football coach and former player who serves as the head coach at Kenya U-20 women side, The Rising Starlets. She is credited as being the first ever female to coach a Kenyan Premier League side when she joined FC Talanta as the head coach in August 2024.

== Career ==
Juma began playing football at the age of 9. She represented the Kenya national team at international level before retiring in 2016.

She has coached Kenyan women's teams including Gor Mahia Queens, Gaspo Women FC, Kayole Starlets, and Acakoro Ladies as well as Kenya U15, U17, and U20 girls' national teams. She holds a CAF A License, and is a certified CAF Elite Coach Educator.
