= Vincent Nyaberi =

Kenyan footballer

Vincent Nyaberi is a former Kenyan defender who currently serves as the head coach at Kenyan second-tier side Mully Children's Family (MCF).

== Career ==
As a player, Nyaberi featured for Thika United in the Kenyan top flight for several seasons before calling it a day. After hanging his boots, Nyaberi moved to management starting at Thika United, then to a coach where he served, amongst others, at Muranga SEAL where he led to Kenyan Premier league promotion for the first time ever, in 2023.

He's also coached Mara Sugar before joining MCF.
