= Edward Manoah =

Kenyan football manager

Edward Manoah Agadinda (born 12 Feb 1967) is a veteran Kenyan football tactician currently serving as the head coach of Kenyan Premier League side Mara Sugar.

Manoah has in the past coached several Kenyan toplight clubs including A.F.C. Leopards, Chemelil Sugar, Vihiga United and Kakamega Homeboyz, amongst others.
