= Patrick Odhiambo =

Kenyan football manager

Patrick Okumu Odhiambo
Personal information
- Full name: Patrick Okumu Odhiambo
- Height: 1.75 m (5 ft 9 in)
- Position: Defender

Senior career*
Years	Team	Apps	(Gls)
2008-2009	Gor Mahia		

Managerial career
- 2016-2018-: Chemelil Sugar (Head Coach)
- 2018-2019: Sony Sugar (Head Coach)
- 2019-2021: Gor Mahia (Ass. Coach)
- 2021-: Kakamega Homeboyz (Ass. Coach)
- 2021-: Biashara United (Head Coach)
- 2022-: Prisons FC (Head Coach)
- 2023-: Kakamega Homeboyz (Head Coach)
- * Club domestic league appearances and goals

Patrick Okumu Odhiambo is a former Kenyan defender who currently serves as the head coach at Kenyan Premier League side Kakamega Homeboyz.

== Career ==
Odhiambo coached Kenyan topflight sides Chemelil Sugar and Sony Sugar before joining Gor Mahia as an assistant coach in 2019.

He then crossed borders in July 2021 to coach Tanzania's Biashara FC, then Prisons FC from Jan 2022 before returning to Kenya to take over the reins at Kakamega Homeboyz in Feb 2023.

He won the club its first ever silverware by claiming the domestic cup to book a place in the CAF Confederations Cup.

== Honours ==
=== Club ===
Kakamega Homeboyz

- MozzartBet Cup

(gold) Champions (1): 2023
Kakamega Homeboyz

- Kenyan Super Cup

(silver) Runners-up (1): 2023/24
