= Gilbert Selebwa =

Kenyan football manager

Gilbert Selebwa (born 1 Oct 1965) is a US-trained Kenyan football tactician, pundit and commentator. In August 2025 he was appointed as the coach of Kenyan second-tier side Mombasa United.

Selebwa has coached several clubs in the Kenyan Premier League including A.F.C. Leopards in the year 2009, Congo United and Muhoroni Youth F.C. as well as many others in the lower tiers including Shabana F.C. and Luanda Villa.
