= Twahir Muhiddin =

Kenyan football manager

Personal information
- Place of birth: Kenya

Managerial career
- Years: Team
- 2020-2021: Kenya (assistant coach)

Twahir Muhiddin is an association football coach who manages Kenyan Premier League side Bandari. He was the assistant coach of the Kenya national team under German coach Antoine Hey.

On September 17, 2010, Harambee Stars coach Twahir Muhiddin quit as coach of the Kenya national football team following Kenya's 1-0 loss to Guinea-Bissau in the 2012 AFCON qualifiers.
