= Dunstan Nyaudo =

Kenyan football manager

Personal information
- Full name: Dunstan Nyaudo
- Date of birth: 1 January 1971 (age 55)
- Height: 1.82 m (6 ft 0 in)

Managerial career
- Years: Team
- 2024-: Ulinzi Stars (Head Coach)

Dunstan Nyaudo is a former Kenyan international midfielder who currently serves as the head coach at Kenyan Premier League side Ulinzi Stars.

During his playing career, he earned two international caps for the Kenya national team. He is known for his tactical approach and focus on building a young, formidable team. He return to Ulinzi in 2024 for a second stint after the first in 2018.
