= Bobby Ogolla =

Kenyan football manager

John Bobby Ogolla
Personal information
- Full name: John Bobby Ogolla
- Date of birth: 2 May 1959 (age 67)
- Position: Defender

John "Bobby" Ogolla (born in Kenya) is a former Kenyan international defender and football manager.

He previously served as assistant coach to Kenyan Premier League sides Sofapaka F.C. and Gor Mahia F.C., and head coach at World Hope F.C., Nairobi City Stars, Muhoroni Youth F.C. and most recently Kenya Police FC.

== Playing career ==
John Bobby Ogolla played for Kisumu Hot Stars before moving to Gor Mahia in 1979 as the understudy to James Kadir Ogolla.

He soon got a call up to the national team and partnered Josephat Murila of AFC Leopards in defense. They helped Kenya win the regional CECAFA tournament three times in a row from 1981 to 1983.

In the 1983 edition played in Kenya, Kenya conceded only one goal in their first match against Uganda which Kenya won 2-1. They beat Zimbabwe 2-0 to win their third consecutive title.

John Bobby partnered with Austin Oduor in the Gor defense until he retired in 1989.

Twice he was an assistant coach to Kenya head coach Reinhard Fabisch, and was on one occasion the head coach.

As a player, he turned out for Kisumu Hot Stars before joining Gor Mahia F.C.
