= Alfred Imonje =

Kenyan professional football manager

Personal information
- Place of birth: Kenya

Managerial career
- Years: Team
- 2011: Somalia
- 2020: RBV United U-21

Alfred Imonje is a Kenyan professional football manager.

== Career ==
Since July to December 2011 he coached the Somalia national football team.
