= Ezekiel Akwana =

Kenyan football manager

Personal information
- Full name: Ezekiel Akwana
- Date of birth: 30 August 1976 (age 50)
- Place of birth: Lurambi, Kakamega County
- Height: 1.75 m (5 ft 9 in)
- Position: Defender

Managerial career
- Years: Team
- 2016: Nakuru Allstars
- 2018: AFC Leopards
- 2021-2023: Mathare United F.C.
- 2023-: Sofapaka F.C.

Ezekiel Akwana is a former Kenyan defender who currently serves as the head coach at Kenyan Premier League side Sofapaka F.C.

== Career ==
Akwana has coached several clubs in Kenya amongst them, Nakuru AllStars, AFC Leopards, and Mathare United.
