= Tusker (African beer) =

Beer brand owned by East African Breweries

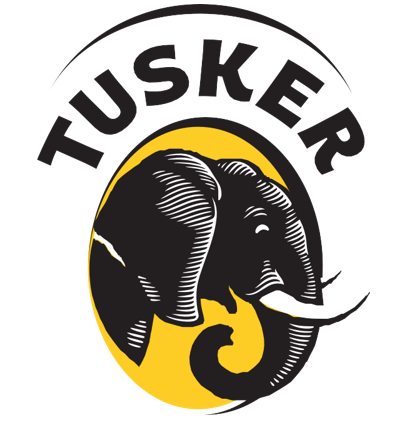
- Type: Beer, pale lager, premium lager
- Manufacturer: Diageo
- Origin: Kenya
- Introduced: 1922
- Alcohol by volume: 4.2% (regular); 5.0% (malt); 4.0% (lite)
- Website: Official brand website

Tusker is a beer brand owned by East African Breweries, with over 700,000 hectolitres sold annually in Kenya. It is also the largest African beer brand in the Diageo group. It is a 4.2% ABV pale lager. The beer's slogan "Bia yangu, Nchi yangu" means "My beer, My country" in Kiswahili.

== History ==
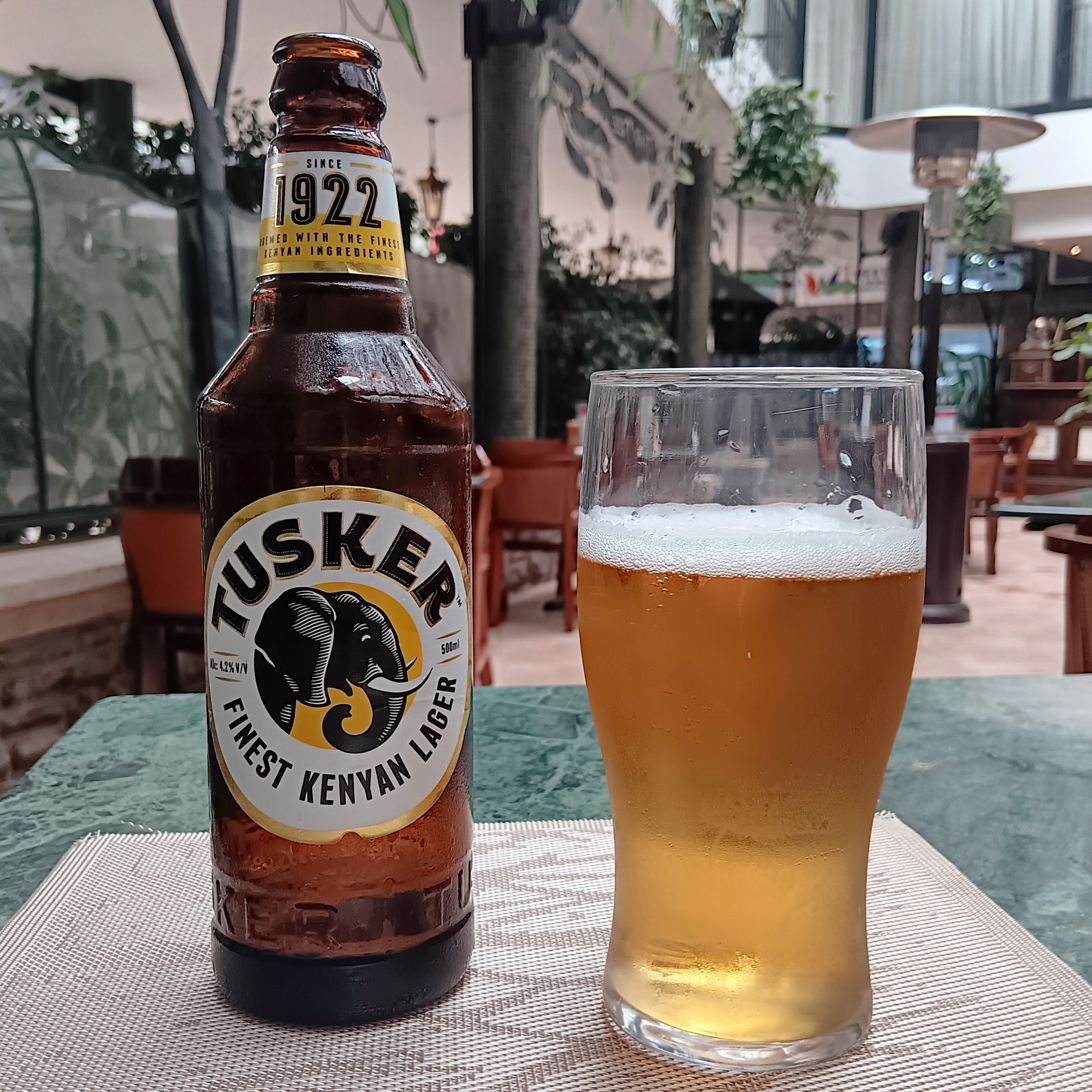
A bottle and glass of Tusker Lager at the Thorn Tree Cafe, Stanley Hotel, Nairobi, in 2025.

In 1922, Kenya Breweries (now East African Breweries) was formally incorporated as a private limited company. The company's first beer was brewed on 15 December 1922. The first batch was delivered to the Stanley Hotel, where it received mixed reactions. Originally brewed in Kenya, the beer expaded to Tanzania and other countries in the African Great Lakes region, and was eventually exported.

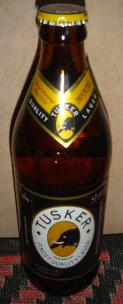
A bottle of Tusker in 2008. New design bottles with the current logo have since been launched.

The company's first annual general meeting was held in 1923. George Hurst, the company's founder, was killed in an elephant hunting accident. In his memory, his brother Charles decided to name the first beer brewed "Tusker", after the local name for large male elephants. In 1929, the company's board moved to use malted barley in the beer's production instead of using imported malt extracts, significantly improving its taste and colour and saving the company at least £780 (approx. US$1,240 or €985) per year. In 2012, that is approximately £35,400 (approx. US$56,220 or €44,690), assuming an annual inflation rate of 2% from 2011 onwards. Wooden beer cases were replaced with plastic cases in 1970. In 1987, Central Glass Industries also began producing Tusker bottles for the first time. In early 2008, the UK supermarket chain Tesco began selling Tusker, followed soon after by Sainsbury's.

== Varieties ==
- Tusker, sold in keg, widget cans and bottles: 4.2% ABV pale lager
- Tusker 5.0%, ABV premium lager
- Tusker Lite, 4.0% ABV lite lager
- Tusker Cider, 4.5% ABV apple cider
- Tusker Malt, 5.0% ABV pilsner-lager

The three varieties of Tusker beer are a gold award-winning products from the World Quality Selections, organized yearly by Monde Selection. The taste and quality have also received recognition at the prestigious Monde Selection’s International Awards.

== See also ==
- Tusker F.C.
