= Zedekiah Otieno =

Kenyan footballer (born 1968)

Personal information
- Date of birth: 30 November 1968 (age 57)
- Place of birth: Kakuma, Kenya

Team information
- Current team: KCB (Manager)

Senior career*
Years	Team	Apps	(Gls)
1989–1996	Gor Mahia		

International career
1992–1995	Kenya	9	(0)

Managerial career
- –2010: Gor Mahia
- 2010–2011: Kenya
- 2011: Gor Mahia
- 2012: Sony Sugar
- 2013–2015: Sony Sugar
- 2015–2017: Posta Rangers
- 2017–2019: Gor Mahia (assistant)
- 2019–: KCB
- * Club domestic league appearances and goals

Zedekiah "Zico" Otieno (born 30 November 1968) is a retired Kenyan footballer who is currently the manager of KCB in the Kenya Premier League.

== Career ==
Otieno was appointed interim coach of the Kenya national football team until he was relieved by Francis Kimanzi in November 2011.

Otieno played for Gor Mahia, and made appearances for the Kenya national football team, including two 1994 FIFA World Cup qualifying matches.

After retiring from playing football, Otieno became a manager. He led his former team Gor Mahia before being appointed Kenya national team manager in December 2010.

After the end of the 2012 Kenyan Premier League, Otieno left Sony Sugar to become a politician. He ran for the post of Councillor of Eastlands, Nairobi during the 2013 general elections, but took a break and was re-appointed at Sony Sugar, succeeding Sammy Omollo, who had replaced him in 2012.

On 10 June 2019, Otieno was appointed manager of KCB in the Kenya Premier League.
