= Benjamin Nyangweso =

Kenyan football manager (born 1968)

Benjamin Shirandula Nyangweso
Personal information
- Full name: Benjamin Shirandula Nyangweso
- Date of birth: 20 August 1968 (age 58)
- Place of birth: Lukume, Kakamega
- Height: 1.83 m (6 ft 0 in)
- Position: Striker

Managerial career
- Years: Team
- 2009: Ulinzi Stars F.C. (Head Coach)

Benjamin Shirandula Nyangweso is a former Kenyan striker who last served as head coach at Kenyan Premier League side Ulinzi Stars. Nyangweso has been in and out of his head coach role at the club on several occasions. He was a striker for Waterworks FC in his heydays.

== National team ==
He was capped six times for Kenya between 1994 and 1996. He was handed his debut game by coach Mohammed Kheri as Kenya took on Somalia on 26 Nov 1994 in a 1994 CECAFA Cup tie held at Nyayo National Stadium after coming on as a substitute for Richard Otambo.
