= Ministry of Sports, Culture and the Arts =

Government ministry of Kenya

The Ministry of Sports, Culture and Heritage of the Republic of Kenya includes the departments of Sports, Office of the Sports Registrar, Culture, Permanent Presidential Music Commission, Kenya National Archives and Documentation Services, Library Services, Records Management, and Arts Services.

They are Semi-Autonomous Government Agencies (SAGAs) namely Sports Kenya, headed by Ogal Sirkal (Hon Ogal Alexstone) since February 2024, Kenya Academy of Sports, National Sports Fund, National Museums of Kenya, Kenya Cultural Centre, and the Kenya National Library Service. Others include National Heroes Council, and Anti-Doping Agency Kenya. Its current Cabinet Secretary is Ababu Namwamba.

The ministry controls an association football team known as Ministry of Sports, Culture and the Arts Football Club (MOSCA) that competes in the Kenyan National Super League, the second tier of the Kenyan football league system.

== History ==
It was established through Executive Order No. 2 “Organization of the Government of the Republic of Kenya" in May 2013.

=== Past Ministers ===
- Najib Balala (2002–2003)
- Ochilo Ayacko (2003–2005)
- Maina Kamanda (2005–2007)
- Esther Murugi (2008–2009)
- Naomi Shaaban (2009–2013)
- Hassan Wario (2013–2018)
- Rashid Echesa (2018–2019)
- Amina Mohammed (2019–2022)
- Ababu Namwamba E.G.H (2022- 2024)

== See also ==
- Kenya
  - Heads of State of Kenya
  - Heads of Government of Kenya
  - Vice-Presidents of Kenya
  - Colonial Heads of Kenya
