= F.C. West Ham United =

Kenyan football club

West Ham United
- Full name: Football Club West Ham United
- Ground: Mombasa Municipal Stadium, Kenya
- Chairman: Fadhili Bayusuf
- Manager: Gilbert Selebwa
- League: FKF Division One
- 2013: 9th (Zone A, Group 2)
Home colours

Football Club West Ham United is a professional Kenyan football club based in Mombasa.

== History ==
At the beginning of the 2012 season, Congo United Football Club signed a one-year partnership deal with the JMJ Academy, and as a result the club was renamed Congo JMJ United Football Club. After the end of the season, no extension of the deal was signed and as a result the club was given its current name, FC West Ham United.
