= Zdravko Logarušić =

Croatian football player (born 1965)

Personal information
- Date of birth: 21 October 1965 (age 61)
- Place of birth: Slavonski Brod, SR Croatia, SFR Yugoslavia

Managerial career
- Years: Team
- 1988–1989: Croatia Malmö
- 1990–1991: FC 08 Villingen
- 1992–1995: Western Knights
- Marsonia
- Vukovar '91
- 2009–2010: King Faisal Babes
- 2010–2011: Ashanti Gold
- 2012–2013: Gor Mahia
- 2013–2014: Simba SC
- 2015–2016: AFC Leopards
- 2016: Interclube
- 2017: Asante Kotoko
- 2017–2019: Sudan
- 2020–2021: Zimbabwe
- 2023: Al-Batin
- 2023–2024: Police F.C.
- 2024–2025: Eswatini
- 2025: Al-Tai
- 2026–: Nations FC
Medal record
Men's football
Representing Sudan (as manager)
African Nations Championship
| Third place | 2018 Morocco |

Zdravko Logarušić (born 21 October 1965) is a Croatian professional football manager/head coach. Overall, he has coached in Europe, Africa, Asia, Australia, and North America. In 2001, Logarušić took coaching courses to get a UEFA Pro Licence.

== Career ==
=== Gor Mahia ===
Chosen as Gor Mahia boss in 2012, he vowed to end the clubs 18-year wait to win the Premier League trophy. In winter 2012, Logarušić was expected to be back for the pre-season training before the new season. He was relieved of duties in June 2013. In his defense, Logarušić demurred that he did not have a work permit and lived in Nairobi on a tourist visa. Secondly, he raised issue about evident lack of formal contract with the Nairobi-based team. Female fans criticized the board for his dismissal.

=== Simba ===
After leaving Kenya, Logarušić was offered a relatively high salary from Simba SC to coach them and took the offer. When he got Simba SC good results, the Tanzanian outfit bought him a house overlooking the beachfront. Unfortunately, he could not speak Swahili which hindered him from communicating fluently with the Tanzanian press. Half a year later, his contract was cancelled. Logarušić demanded TSh 3.6 million from Simba SC as requital for the club unprocedurally cancelling his contract. Still, the club refused to pay him as they said the amount charged was too exorbitant and that he had made a wrongful claim.

=== AFC Leopards ===
Back in 2015, the well-traveled coach was selected as coach for AFC Leopards of the Kenyan Premier League. Afterward, he parted ways with them when he sent a text message to them stating that he quit the club as 'he was forced to go back to Croatia because no one was taking care of his rent' and that he was evicted from his apartment.

=== Asante Kotoko ===
A year later, ahead of the 2017 Ghanaian Premier League, he was appointed boss of Asante Kotoko which was the third time he managed in Ghana. To incentivize him, the Ghanaian side bestowed a new car on him a month into the new season. As Asante Kotoko's manager, he invariably used the 3-5-2 formation which exasperated the fans. Using that formation, he got them ten points in four games and temporarily placed them second in the table. Fired by Asante Kotoko in April 2017 after winning five out of eleven games, Logarušić labelled the Asante Kotoko management as 'liars'.

=== Sudan ===
Logarušić became manager of the Sudan national team in December 2017. He was removed from the position on 30 November 2019.

=== Zimbabwe ===
On 29 January 2020, Logarušić was appointed coach of the Zimbabwe national team. In March 2021, Logarušić guided the Warriors to their fifth Africa Cup of Nations qualification.

On 12 September 2021 Logarušić was dismissed by the Zimbabwean FA following a poor string of results. A loss to Ethiopia and a goalless draw against South Africa in the 2022 World Cup qualifiers saw pressure mounting on the local football body to take action after getting just one win out of his 14 games with the national team.

=== Al-Batin ===
On 19 February 2023, Logarušić was appointed as manager of Saudi Arabian club Al-Batin following the sacking of Alen Horvat.

=== Al-Tai ===
On 16 April 2025, Logarušić was appointed as manager of Saudi First Division League club Al-Tai.

== Honours ==
=== Manager ===
Sudan

- African Nations Championship: 3rd place, 2018
