= James Nandwa =

Kenyan football manager

Personal information
- Full name: James Nandwa Nyende
- Place of birth: Kenya

Managerial career
- Years: Team
- 2010–2011: Tusker
- 2012–2013: Kenya
- 2013–2014: AFC Leopards

James Nandwa Nyende is a Kenyan football manager.

== Early life ==
Nandwa initially operated as a striker. He the switched to midfielder and defender.

== Career ==
In 2013, Nandwa was appointed manager of Kenyan side AFC Leopards. He helped the club win the 2013 FKF President's Cup. In 2016, Nandwa was appointed manager of Kenyan side Thika United. He was described as "since he took charge... picked an impressive haul of seven points from their four matches" while managing the club.
