= Francis Baraza =

Kenyan footballer

Francis Baraza is a former Kenyan defender currently serving as the head coach of Tanzanian Premier League side Dodoma Jiji FC.

He previously coached Kenya Police, Tusker FC, Chemelil Sugar, Western Stima and Sony Sugar, as well as Tanzanian sides Biashara United and Kagera Sugar.
