= Stanley Okumbi =

Kenyan football manager

Personal information
- Place of birth: Kenya

Managerial career
- Years: Team
- 2016–2017: Kenya
- 2018: Kenya
- 2019–2020: Kenya
- 2021-: Posta Rangers

Stanley Okumbi (born in Kenya) is a Kenyan football manager.
