= Sammy Omollo =

Kenyan footballer (born 1970)

Personal information
- Full name: Samuel 'Pamzo' Omollo
- Date of birth: 30 May 1970 (age 56)
- Place of birth: Kakuma, Kenya
- Position: Defender

Team information
- Current team: Shabana (Head coach)

Senior career*
Years	Team	Apps	(Gls)
1990–1992	Kenya Breweries		
1992–1994	Gor Mahia		
1994–1996	Kenya Breweries		
1996–1998	East Bengal		(4)
1998–2001	Mohun Bagan		
2002–2005	Kenya Pipeline		
2005–2006	Securicor		

International career
1992–2000	Kenya	20	(0)

Managerial career
- 2009–2010: Mahakama
- 2010–2012: Tusker
- 2012–2012: Oserian
- 2012–2013: Sony Sugar
- 2014–2015: Zetech University
- 2015–2016: East Bengal (assistant)
- 2018–2019: KCB
- 2019–2021: Posta Rangers
- 2021–2024: Gor Mahia F.C. (Assistant Coach)
- 2021–: Shabana F.C. (Head Coach)
- * Club domestic league appearances and goals

Samuel "Pamzo" Omollo (born 30 May 1970) is a former Kenya international football defender who played for clubs in Kenya and India. He is currently the head coach of Bandari, and he is also a football analyst at Radio Jambo FM, which is a broadcast radio station from Nairobi, Kenya, providing sports, talk shows and African music.

== Personal life ==
Born on May 30, 1970, Sammy Omollo was raised in Park road estate in Ngara, where his nickname was "Pamzo". He is the son of Dishon Omollo, who also captained Harambee Stars and retired with quite some remarkable international games to his name.

Omollo quickly took his position in cricket as an all-rounder, meaning that he could throw the ball, could hit it again as a batsman. But later, his passion for cricket fazed off when he joined Githumu high school in Murang’a County and found out other friends who were good in football like Douglas Karanja who later played with him at Kenya Breweries and Charles Machiwa.

== Club career ==
In 1989, his journey to football started when he guided his high school at the nationals' secondary school games finals against a Henry Motego led Kisii high school in Kakamega. At this level, Austrian born tactician Gerry Saurer was in the country and worked with the Kenyan national team. The Austrian was building Harambee Stars from bottom to top and was the person in charge on the under-21s. Here Omollo was recruited among other Kenyan greats like Francis 'killer' Oduor, Peter Mwololo, Vincent Kwarula, Allan Odhiambo, Tony Lwanga and many others.

Omollo began his senior professional career there and making his Kenyan Premier League debut for Kenya Breweries F.C. in 1990. In 1992, he joined rivals Gor Mahia F.C. for two seasons before returning to Kenya Breweries. Omollo helped Kenya Breweries reach the final of the 1994 African Cup Winners' Cup. In 1992, Gormahia convinced his late father Dishon Omollo that K'ogallo was the way to go.

He turned out for Gor till 1994 then returned to Kenya Breweries after winning the Kenyan Premier League in 1993. He played for Kenya Breweries up to 1996 and won the Kenyan Premier League in his final year with the Brewers.

Omollo later moved to India and signed a professional contract with National Football League side East Bengal FC from Kolkata in 1996. He officially became the first Kenyan footballer to play in the Indian highest tier football league. With Red and Gold Brigade, he twice won the Calcutta Football League and the IFA Shield before leaving the side in 1998 for city rivals Mohun Bagan, with whom he won the CFL again, and the shield too.

After spending two tremendous successful seasons in Indian football, he moved to Subrata Bhattacharya managed Mohun Bagan for another three seasons deal.

In 2001, just after returning to Kenya, he joined Gor Mahia again and here they badly needed his experience both as a player and as a coach.

== International career ==
Omollo made all total 20 FIFA international appearances (excluding 3 non-FIFA matches) for the Kenya national football team. He represented his country in five 1994 FIFA World Cup qualifying matches between 1992 and 1993.

He debuted for Kenya at the 1992 African Cup of Nations in a match on 16 January against Senegal.

== Managerial career ==
Omolo began his coaching career here with Gor Mahia, with responsibilities of also doubling up as a player. In 2002, Kenya Pipeline F.C. hired his services. He helped Vincent ‘yaro’ Ogejo, and Joe ‘siti’ Odongo captain the side.

After he retired from playing, Omollo became a full-time manager and led Mahakama to the Kenyan Premier League. He was appointed manager of Tusker in late 2010. While at Tusker FC he won the Kenyan Premier League title in the year 2011.

From 2012 to 2015, life in coaching became ups and downs. He coached the now disbanded Oserian fastac and SoNy Sugar. Later, he went to the lower division sides and coached Zetech University before his former club in India came calling.

He went back to Kolkata and managed East Bengal FC in the I-League as an assistant coach. He won the Calcutta Football League there as coach, previously he had won it as a player. Just like he did it in Kenya, he returned to India and did it again.

He silently jetted back to Kenya after falling out with the Indian club's hierarchy and eventually settled at Kenyan Premier League outfit Posta Rangers in 2016. He was with the club for several years until 2001, when Posta Rangers sacked him due to their bad performances.

In February 2021, Omollo appointed on Kenyan champions Gor Mahia's duty as an assistant coach.

On January 10, 2024, he was appointed as Shabana FC head coach.

== Honours ==
=== Club ===
Gor Mahia

- Kenyan Premier League

(gold) Champions (1): 1993
Tusker F.C.

- Kenyan Premier League

(gold) Champions (2): 1994, 1996
East Bengal

- Federation Cup

(gold) Champions (1): 1996

- IFA Shield

(gold) Champions (2): 1994, 1995

- Durand Cup

(gold) Champions (1): 1995
Mohun Bagan

- National Football League

(gold) Champions (3): 1997–98, 1999–2000, 2001–02

- Federation Cup

(gold) Champions (2): 1998, 2001

- Durand Cup

(gold) Champions (1): 2000

- Rovers Cup

(gold) Champions (1): 2000

- IFA Shield

(gold) Champions (2): 1998, 1998

- Federation Cup

(gold) Champions (1): 1996

- Calcutta Football League

(gold) Champions (1): 2001

== See also ==
- Kenya men's international footballers
