= 2012 FKF President's Cup =

Tournament details
- Country: Kenya
- Teams: 34

Final positions
- Champions: Gor Mahia
- Runners-up: Sofapaka
- Confederation Cup: Gor Mahia

Tournament statistics
- Matches played: 31
- Goals scored: 117 (3.77 per match)
- Top goal scorer(s): (Kenya) Humphrey Mieno (Kenya) Erasto Ndege (Uganda) David Nyanzi (Kenya) Moses Odhiambo (4 goals each)

The 2012 FKF President's Cup was the 41st season of Kenya's top domestic cup competition. The deadline for application was 30 July, and 32 clubs had registered for participation to the tournament after paying a mandatory KSh.15,000/= fee, with a final list of 34 teams. The quarter-finals were played on 6−7 October, while the semi-finals and the final were played on 17−18 November and 21 November respectively, after the end of the 2012 Kenyan Premier League.

Two teams were to be knocked out in the first round (playoff matches) to decide who would advance to the second round.

By winning the tournament, Gor Mahia earned a place in the preliminary round of the 2013 CAF Confederation Cup, and will play Tusker, the winners of the 2012 Kenyan Premier League, at the 2013 Kenyan Super Cup.

== Teams ==
The following is the final list of teams that participated in the tournament.

Team	League
A.F.C. Leopards	Premier League
Bidco United^{r}	Division One
Borabu Chiefs	Nyanza South County League
Buruburu Sacramento	Nairobi County League
Congo JMJ United	Division One
F.C. Talanta	None
Gor Mahia	Premier League
Isiolo Youth	Upper Eastern Provincial League
Kakamega Homeboyz	Division One
Karuturi Sports	Premier League
Kenya Revenue Authority	Division One
Keroka Technical	Kisii County League
Longonot Horticulture	Division One
Mahakama	Division One
Malindi United^{r}	North Coast Provincial League
Mathare United	Premier League
Maua United^{r}	Upper Eastern Provincial League
MOYAS^{r}	Division One
Muhoroni Youth	Premier League
Murang'a United	Central Provincial League
Nairobi Stima	Division One
Nakumatt	Nairobi Provincial League
Nzoia United	Division One
Raiply	Rift Valley Provincial League
Shabana Kisii^{r}	Division One
Sofapaka	Premier League
Taqwa	Upper Eastern Provincial League
Tetu Stars	Central Provincial League
Tusker	Premier League
Ulinzi Stars	Premier League
Wamo	Garissa County League
Wazito	Nairobi County League
West Kenya Sugar	Division One
Western Stima	Premier League
r denotes teams that have since withdrawn from the tournament.

== First round ==
Playoff matches in the first round between Muranga United, Maua United, Taqwa and Tetu Stars were played to decide who would advance to the second round.

4 August 2012	Murang'a United	w/o	Maua United
15:00 UTC+3	Walkover awarded	Report

Murang'a United were awarded a walkover as Maua United withdrew from the tournament.

4 August 2012	Taqwa	1 − 0	Tetu Stars	Isiolo Stadium, Isiolo
15:00 UTC+3	Abdi 54'	Report; News

Taqwa were knocked out of the tournament due to "technicalities".

== Bracket ==
The FKF decided to change the quarter-final fixtures, meaning that A.F.C. Leopards and Kenya Revenue Authority were now to face Karuturi Sports and Sofapaka respectively.

Second round
Gor Mahia	5
Borabu Chiefs	2
Buruburu Sacramento	0
Western Stima	2
Muhoroni Youth	3
West Kenya Sugar	0
Kakamega Homeboyz	2
Bidco United	0
Congo JMJ United	3
Isiolo Youth	1
A.F.C. Leopards	2
Mathare United	0
Sofapaka	3
Ulinzi Stars	0
Longonot Horticulture	1
Mahakama	3
Murang'a United	0
Wamo	1
Tusker	4
Keroka Technical	0
Tetu Stars	0
Talanta	2
Raiply	0
Nzoia United	2
Wazito	2
MOYAS	0
K.R.A.	2
Malindi United	0
Karuturi Sports	4
Nakumatt	0
Nairobi Stima	2
Shabana Kisii	0

Third round
Gor Mahia	1 (5)
Western Stima	1 (4)
Muhoroni Youth	2
Kakamega Homeboyz	1
Congo JMJ United	1
A.F.C. Leopards	3
Sofapaka	4
Mahakama	2
Wamo	0
Tusker	13
Talanta	2
Nzoia United	0
Wazito	1
K.R.A.	2
Karuturi Sports	0 (4)
Nairobi Stima	0 (3)

Quarter-finals
Gor Mahia	0 (4)
Muhoroni Youth	0 (2)
A.F.C. Leopards	3
Karuturi Sports	1
Tusker	2
Talanta	0
K.R.A.	1
Sofapaka	2

Semi-finals
Gor Mahia	2
A.F.C. Leopards	1
Tusker	0
Sofapaka	1

Final
Gor Mahia	0 (3)
Sofapaka	0 (0)

== Second round ==
The draw for the second round of matches was held on 30 July 2012 and ties were played from 4 August to 12 August. Having been beaten, Malindi United, Bidco United, MOYAS and Shabana Kisii still withdrew from the tournament.

4 August 2012	Tusker	4 − 0	Keroka Technical	Nairobi City Stadium, Nairobi
15:00 UTC+3	Ndege 36', 56'; Nyanzi 70'; Wendo 86'	Report

4 August 2012	Raiply	0 − 2	Nzoia United	Eldoret Polytechnic Grounds, Eldoret
15:00 UTC+3		Report	Watiti 15'; Tietie 70'

4 August 2012	Congo JMJ United	3 − 1	Isiolo Youth	Hope Centre, Nairobi
15:00 UTC+3	Ajiga 38'; Misiko 62'; Masika 85'	Report	Masudi 25'

4 August 2012	Kenya Revenue Authority	2 − 0	Malindi United
15:00 UTC+3		Report

4 August 2012	Longonot Horticulture	1 − 3	Mahakama	Kingfisher Grounds, Naivasha
15:00 UTC+3	Kinyokie 85'	Report	Kidiga 21'; Ambembo 51', 71'

4 August 2012	Kakamega Homeboyz	2 − 0	Bidco United
15:00 UTC+3		Report

4 August 2012	Sofapaka	3 − 0	Ulinzi Stars	Moi International Sports Centre, Nairobi
15:00 UTC+3	Njoroge 48'; Asike 75'; Mieno 77' (pen.)	Report

4 August 2012	A.F.C. Leopards	2 − 0	Mathare United	Nyayo National Stadium, Nairobi
15:00 UTC+3	Bageya 53'; Wanga 62'	Report

4 August 2012	Buruburu Sacramento	0 − 2	Western Stima	Stima Club, Nairobi
15:00 UTC+3		Report	Mangi 29'; Omuse 74'

5 August 2012	Gor Mahia	5 − 2	Borabu Chiefs	Nairobi City Stadium, Nairobi
15:00 UTC+3	Anguyo 11'; Ochieng 21'; Lavatsa 67'; Salim 70'; Imbem 76'	Report	Obwoge 30', 35'

5 August 2012	Karuturi Sports	4 − 0	Nakumatt	Kingfisher Grounds, Naivasha
15:00 UTC+3	Chole 25'; Msiebe 58', 88'; Oduor 75'	Report

5 August 2012	Nairobi Stima	2 − 0	Shabana Kisii
15:00 UTC+3		Report

5 August 2012	Wazito	2 − 0	MOYAS
15:00 UTC+3

5 August 2012	Muhoroni Youth	3 − 0	West Kenya Sugar	Muhoroni Stadium, Muhoroni
15:00 UTC+3	Mohammed 70', 78'; Neto 89'	Report

12 August 2012	Murang'a United	0 − 1	Wamo	Ihura Stadium, Murang'a
15:00 UTC+3		Report	Unidentified 6'

12 August 2012	Tetu Stars	0 − 2	Talanta	Gachie Stadium, Nyeri
16:00 UTC+3		Report	Nzenze 46'; Muchiri 76'

== Third round ==
The third round of matches was played on the weekend of 1−2 September in various venues, all at 15:00 UTC+3 time.

1 September 2012	Sofapaka	4 − 2	Mahakama	Moi International Sports Centre, Nairobi
15:00 UTC+3	Mieno 3', 30', 48'; Monday 26'	Report	Ougo (yellow card) 9' (red card) 47'; Pilipili (yellow card) 45'; Kamau 46'; Mmatsi (yellow card) 72'; Juma 79'

1 September 2012	Gor Mahia	1 − 1 (5 − 4 p)	Western Stima	Nairobi City Stadium, Nairobi
15:00 UTC+3	M. Otieno 8'	Report	Bai 27'
	Penalties
	Anguyo (penalty scored); Odhiambo (penalty scored); Omondi (penalty scored); Mosoti (penalty scored); Sserunkuma (penalty scored)		(penalty scored) Shimonyo; (penalty scored) Sirengo; (penalty missed) D. Otieno; (penalty scored) Mangi; (penalty scored) Omuse

1 September 2012	Wazito	1 − 2	Kenya Revenue Authority	Hope Centre, Nairobi
15:00 UTC+3	Onyango 27'	Report	Likhanga (yellow card) 11'; Tiego 22'; Omondi (yellow card) 25'; Likhabu 45' (pen.)

2 September 2012	Congo JMJ United	1 − 3	A.F.C. Leopards	Nyayo National Stadium, Nairobi
13:00 UTC+3	Otieno 27'	Report	Okwemba 23'; Wanga 77'; Baraza 81'

2 September 2012	Wamo	0 − 13	Tusker	Nairobi City Stadium, Nairobi
13:00 UTC+3		Report	Emeka 7', 15'; Kagogo 13', 37'; Mbugi 23'; Nyanzi 44', 84'; Ojwang 47', 71'; Ochieng 63'; Ndege 75', 77'; Odipo 87'

2 September 2012	Karuturi Sports	0 − 0 (4 − 3 p)	Nairobi Stima	Kingfisher Grounds, Naivasha
13:00 UTC+3		Report
	Penalties
	Juma (penalty scored); J. Omondi (penalty scored); K. Omondi (penalty scored); Siruma (penalty missed); Msiebe (penalty scored)		Onyango (penalty missed); Aziz (penalty scored); Mzambara (penalty missed); J. Mbindyo (penalty scored); V. Mbindyo (penalty scored)

2 September 2012	Talanta	2 − 0	Nzoia United	Afraha Stadium, Nakuru
13:00 UTC+3	Ndara 17' (o.g.); Abdulrahman 30'		Report

2 September 2012	Muhoroni Youth	2 − 1	Kakamega Homeboyz	Muhoroni Stadium, Muhoroni
15:00 UTC+3	Wakhanya 25'; Neto 61'	Report	Otieno 6'

== Quarter-finals ==
The quarter-finals were played on the weekend of 6–7 October. The FKF changed two of the fixtures for the round, meaning that A.F.C. Leopards and K.R.A. were now to meet Karuturi Sports and Sofapaka respectively. The decision raised many eyebrows as questions arose regarding the true motive behind the FKF's decision.

6 October 2012	A.F.C. Leopards	3 − 1	Karuturi Sports	Nyayo National Stadium, Nairobi
15:00 UTC+3	Mang'oli 7'; Ochieng 64'; Baraza 65'	Report	Ogutu 28'

6 October 2012	Kenya Revenue Authority	1 − 2	Sofapaka	Nairobi City Stadium, Nairobi
15:00 UTC+3	Macharia 18' (pen.)		Owino 29'; Monday 75'

7 October 2012	Gor Mahia	0 − 0 (4 − 2 p)	Muhoroni Youth	Nairobi City Stadium, Nairobi
15:00 UTC+3		Report
	Penalties
	Salim (penalty scored); Odhiambo (penalty scored); Juma (penalty scored); Sserunkuma (penalty scored)		Ateng (penalty scored); Nyapala (penalty scored); Oriki (penalty missed)

7 October 2012	Tusker	2 − 0	Talanta	Moi International Sports Centre, Nairobi
15:00 UTC+3	Nyanzi 28'; Emeka 50'	Report

== Semi-finals ==
The semi-finals are being played on the weekend of 17–18 November. They were to be played on the weekend on 20–21 October, but the dates were pushed so as not to clash with the Kenyan Premier League schedule.

17 November 2012	Gor Mahia	2 − 1	A.F.C. Leopards	Moi International Sports Centre, Nairobi
15:00 UTC+3	Omondi 12'; Odhiambo 52'	Report	Okwemba 81'

18 November 2012	Tusker	0 – 1	Sofapaka	Moi International Sports Centre, Nairobi
15:00 UTC+3		Report	Ochieng (yellow card) 58'; Nyaga 75'

== Final ==
The final was played on 20 November at the Nyayo National Stadium. Gor Mahia won 3–0 on penalties to win the title a record 10th time.

20 November 2012
19:00 UTC+3

Gor Mahia	0 – 0	Sofapaka
	Report
Penalties
Anguyo (penalty scored); Odhiambo (penalty scored); Salim (penalty scored)	3 − 0	(penalty missed) Asike; (penalty missed) Juma; (penalty missed) Mieno

Nyayo National Stadium, Nairobi
Referee: Sylvester Kirwa

== Top goalscorers ==
Rank	Name	Team	Goals
1	(Kenya) Moses Odhiambo	Gor Mahia	4
1	(Kenya) Humphrey Mieno	Sofapaka	4
1	(Kenya) Erasto Ndege	Tusker	4
1	(Uganda) David Nyanzi	Tusker	4
5	(Kenya) Ivan Anguyo	Gor Mahia	3
5	(Kenya) Rama Salim	Gor Mahia	3
5	(Kenya) Geoffrey Msiebe	Karuturi Sports	3
5	(Nigeria) Joseph Emeka	Tusker	3
9	(Kenya) Mike Baraza	A.F.C. Leopards	2
9	(Kenya) Allan Wanga	A.F.C. Leopards	2
9	(Kenya) Jared Obwoge	Borabu Chiefs	2
9	(Kenya) Kevin Omondi	Gor Mahia	2
9	(Uganda) Dan Sserunkuma	Gor Mahia	2
9	(Kenya) Paul Ambembo	Mahakama	2
9	(Kenya) Yusuf Mohammed	Muhoroni Youth	2
9	(Kenya) Collins Neto	Muhoroni Youth	2
9	(Kenya) Osborne Monday	Sofapaka	2
9	(Democratic Republic of the Congo) Patrick Kagogo	Tusker	2
9	(Kenya) Frederick Ojwang	Tusker	2
9	(Kenya) Alloys Mangi	Western Stima	2
9	(Kenya) Job Omuse	Western Stima	2

== See also ==
- 2012 Kenyan Premier League
- 2012 Kenyan Super Cup
