= 2012 KPL Top 8 Cup =

Tournament details
- Country: Kenya
- Teams: 8

Final positions
- Champions: Gor Mahia
- Runner-up: Ulinzi Stars

Tournament statistics
- Matches played: 9
- Goals scored: 24 (2.67 per match)
- Top goal scorer(s): James Mulinge; Hadji Mwachoki; Rama Salim (2 goals each)

Awards
- Best player: Jerim Onyango

The 2012 KPL Top 8 Cup was the second edition of the football tournament which ran from 14 March to 19 August 2012. It was contested by the top 8 teams of the 2011 Kenyan Premier League season: A.F.C. Leopards, Chemelil Sugar, Gor Mahia, Rangers, Sofapaka, Sony Sugar, Tusker and Ulinzi Stars.

Ulinzi Stars were the defending champions, having won their first title in the inaugural edition of the tournament, but were denied a second title after losing to champions Gor Mahia in the final.

== 2011 Kenyan Premier League standings ==
Top 8
Pos	Team	Pld	W	D	L	GF	GA	GD	Pts	Qualification or relegation
1	Tusker (C, Q)	30	17	7	6	34	17	+17	58	Qualification for 2012 CAF Champions League
2	Ulinzi Stars	30	16	9	5	38	20	+18	57	
3	Sofapaka	30	15	7	8	42	23	+19	52	
4	Gor Mahia (Q)	30	12	12	6	27	22	+5	48	Qualification for 2012 CAF Confederation Cup (Note: Gor Mahia as winners of the 2011 FKL Cup qualified for the 2012 CAF Confederation Cup.)
5	A.F.C. Leopards	30	13	7	10	36	27	+9	46	
6	SoNy Sugar	30	13	5	12	33	33	0	44	
7	Rangers	30	11	10	9	33	31	+2	43	
8	Chemelil Sugar	30	10	11	9	30	27	+3	41	

Updated to match(es) played on 16 December 2011. Source: 2011 Kenyan Premier League
Rules for classification: 1) points; 2) goal difference; 3) number of goals scored.
(C) Champions; (Q) Qualified for the phase indicated

== Bracket ==
Quarterfinals
Ulinzi Stars	2 (2)
Chemelil Sugar	2 (1)
Sofapaka	0
Sony Sugar	1
Gor Mahia	2
A.F.C. Leopards	0
Tusker	3
Rangers	2

Semifinals
Ulinzi Stars	1	2	3
Sony Sugar	1	1	2
Gor Mahia	1	3	4
Tusker	0	0	0

Finals
Ulinzi Stars	0
Gor Mahia	2

== Quarter-finals ==
The quarter-final ties were played between 14 March and 29 July 2012.

=== Gor Mahia−A.F.C. Leopards match ===
The Nairobi derby match scheduled for 1 April 2012 was postponed, as Gor Mahia were banned from the Nyayo National Stadium following an incident that led to a riot by Gor fans during another derby match on 18 March 2012. However, A.F.C. Leopards were dissatisfied with the ruling made by the IDCC and opted to drop out of the tournament, but it had been decided that the match would take place on 20 May 2012. Lack of a suitable venue to host the clash led to the match being postponed yet again. Gor Mahia were however allowed to play in the Moi International Sports Centre, allowing for the fixture to be played. The date for the match was confirmed to be 29 July 2012, with the venue as the Moi International Sports Centre in Kasarani. However, Gor Mahia are yet to have their ban from the Nyayo National Stadium lifted.

Gor Mahia were awarded a walkover and 2 goals for their match after A.F.C. Leopards failed to turn up. The latter were consequently fined KSh.500,000/=, even though they had previously stated that they would not honour the fixture, citing no consultation of an appropriate date with the KPL and financial problems. However, KPL CEO Jack Oguda had stated that Leopards were to be fined KSh 1.5 million/=, and may have to pay another KSh.3.5 million/= fine, linked to the incurred expenses that broadcasters SuperSport could forward to the KPL. The Football Kenya Federation, however, suspended the result after, having demanded to be furnished with security measures to be taken for and the rules and regulations governing the tournament, the KPL failed to reply with furnishings. The suspension was lifted on 1 August 2012 after a consultative meeting held between FKF and KPL officials. The FKF also nullified the fine that was imposed on A.F.C. Leopards, after the club released an official press statement explaining the reason why they failed to appear for their match against Gor Mahia.

=== Fixtures ===
14 March 2012	Sofapaka	0–1	Sony Sugar	Nyayo National Stadium
17:00 UTC+3		Report	Omondi (yellow card) 33'; Oyoo 82'

21 March 2012	Ulinzi Stars	2–2 (90 min.) (2–1 p)	Chemelil Sugar	Nyayo National Stadium
15:00 UTC+3	Mulinge 41' (pen.); Owino (yellow card) 63'; Amuoka 75'	Report	Mwachoki 61'; Omondi 68'
	Penalties
	(penalty missed) Muhati; (penalty scored) Mulinge; (penalty scored) Ouma; (penalty missed) Ochola		(penalty scored) Mwachoki; (penalty missed) Mzee Matano; (penalty missed) Omondi; (penalty missed) Opondo

29 July 2012	Gor Mahia	w/o	A.F.C. Leopards	Moi International Sports Centre
15:00 UTC+3	Walkover awarded

4 April 2012	Tusker	3–2	Rangers	Nyayo National Stadium
19:00 UTC+3	Emeka 22'; Wendo (yellow card) 34'; Mandela 49'; Onyango 87'	Report	Chege (yellow card) 15' (goal) 26', 90'

== Semi-finals ==
The semi-finals were played between 2 August and 9 August 2012.

=== First leg ===
2 August 2012	Ulinzi Stars	1–1	Sony Sugar	Moi International Sports Centre
16:00 UTC+3	Otieno 3'; Ochomo (yellow card) 17'	Report	Tumba (yellow card) 11'; Agwanda 86' (yellow card) 87'

2 August 2012	Gor Mahia	1–0	Tusker	Moi International Sports Centre
19:00 UTC+3	Abondo (yellow card) 24'; Anguyo 36'	Report	Mukaisi (red card) 46'; Odipo (yellow card) 77'

=== Second leg ===
8 August 2012	Sony Sugar	1–2	Ulinzi Stars	Nyayo National Stadium
19:00 UTC+3	I. Salim 80'	Report	Ochola 36'; Nderitu 39'

Ulinzi Stars won 3−2 on aggregate.

9 August 2012	Tusker	0–3	Gor Mahia	Nairobi City Stadium
16:00 UTC+3	S. Odhiambo (yellow card) 9'; Okoti (yellow card) 24'	Report	R. Salim 3'; M. Odhiambo 53' (yellow card) 84'; Lavatsa 58'

Gor Mahia won 4−0 on aggregate.

== Final ==
The final was played on 19 August 2012, at the Moi International Sports Centre.

19 August 2012	Ulinzi Stars	0–2 (a.e.t.)	Gor Mahia	Moi International Sports Centre
15:30 UTC+3	(yellow card) 18' Serenge; (yellow card) 27' Ochomo	Report	(yellow card) 36' Anguyo; 93' R. Salim; 104' Imbem
