= Mashemeji derby =

Kenyan football rivalry between AFC Leopards and Gor Mahia FC

- Other names: Ingo-Dala derby
- Location: Kenya
- Teams: A.F.C. Leopards; Gor Mahia
- First meeting: 5 May 1968 (58 years ago)
- Latest meeting: 26 April 2026; Premier League; A.F.C. Leopards v Gor Mahia

Statistics
- Total meetings: 99
- Most wins: Gor Mahia (35)
- All-time series: A.F.C. Leopards: 29; Draws: 35; Gor Mahia: 35
- Largest victory: 10 November 2019; Premier League; Gor Mahia 4–1 A.F.C. Leopards

The Mashemeji derby (English: Derby of the In-laws), also known as the Ingo-Dala derby, is the name of the local derby between two major association football teams in Kenya: A.F.C. Leopards and Gor Mahia. Both teams are currently based in the capital Nairobi, but originate from the Western region. It is the oldest rivalry in Kenyan football history.

Fans of both A.F.C. Leopards and Gor Mahia (often referred to by their nicknames, Ingwe and K'Ogalo, respectively) recognize each other as arch-rivals. As of 2025, Gor Mahia has won the Kenyan Premier League a record 21 times, while A.F.C. Leopards have 12 league titles to their name.

== Summary of recent matches ==
Date	Home Team	Score	Away Team	Competition	Source and/or note
26 April 2026	Gor Mahia	1–0	AFC Leopards	Football Kenya Federation Premier League	
7 December 2025	Gor Mahia	0–1	AFC Leopards	Kenyan Premier League	
2 June 2025	Gor Mahia	1–1	AFC Leopards	Kenyan Premier League	
30 March 2025	AFC Leopards	0–0	Gor Mahia	Kenyan Premier League	
21 April 2024	Gor Mahia	1–0	AFC Leopards	Kenyan Premier League	
7 October 2023	AFC Leopards	0–2	Gor Mahia	Kenyan Premier League	
14 May 2023	Gor Mahia	1–2	AFC Leopards	Kenyan Premier League	
29 January 2023	AFC Leopards	0–0	Gor Mahia	Kenyan Premier League	
8 May 2022	Gor Mahia	1–1	AFC Leopards	[	
20 October 2021	AFC Leopards	0–1	Gor Mahia	Kenyan Premier League	
4 July 2021	AFC Leopards	0–0 (1–4 pens)	Gor Mahia	Kenya Shield Cup	
7 February 2021	Gor Mahia	0–0	AFC Leopards	Kenyan Premier League	
10 November 2019	Gor Mahia	4–1	AFC Leopards	Kenyan Premier League	
19 May 2019	AFC Leopards	1–3	Gor Mahia	Kenyan Premier League	
9 February 2019	Gor Mahia	2–0	AFC Leopards	Kenyan Premier League	
25 August 2018	Gor Mahia	2–0	AFC Leopards	Kenyan Premier League	
22 July 2018	AFC Leopards	1–2	Gor Mahia	Kenyan Premier League	
1 May 2018	Gor Mahia	0–0	AFC Leopards	Club Friendly	
28 January 2018	AFC Leopards	0–1	Gor Mahia	Super Cup	
27 August 2017	Gor Mahia	1–1	AFC Leopards	Kenyan Premier League	
14 May 2017	AFC Leopards	1–1	Gor Mahia	Kenyan Premier League	
8 May 2017	Gor Mahia	3–0	AFC Leopards	Kenyan Premier League	

== History ==
The two clubs have been bitter rivals since they first locked horns on 5 May 1968. In a match on 23 March 2012, Gor Mahia fans began to riot after midfielder Ali Abondo was given a red card following a dangerous tackle on Leopards' Amon Muchiri. Gor Mahia was banned by the Sports Stadia Management Board from using their facilities for the rest of the 2012 season (those being the Nyayo National Stadium and the Kasarani Stadium) as a result. This was also the reason for the postponing of their Round of 8 derby match in the 2012 KPL Top 8 Cup.

Before that, on Heroes' Day 2011, Leopards fans had caused abandonment of an FKL Cup quarter-final by pelting linesmen with objects after Gor Mahia went ahead with a superbly worked goal from a Moses Odhiambo and Moses Otieno combination which saw the former head in a superbly taken free kick by the latter. Leopards were made to forfeit the game and controversially escaped further bans despite the 1-0 scoreline being allowed to stand. Gor Mahia went on to memorably lift the Cup beating Sofapaka at the Nairobi City Stadium six days later and earn a right to represent Kenya in the 2012 CAF Confederation Cup.

On 8 June 2014, the two teams faced off again in a Kenyan Premier League match at the Nyayo National Stadium. Having taken the lead in the 24th minute through Timonah Wanyonyi, Gor Mahia conceded the equaliser in the 35th minute when Charles Okwemba sent Jacob Keli through on goal, with Keli slotting home past keeper Jerim Onyango. A.F.C. Leopards had to wait until the second half to take the lead, when Okwemba was fouled by left back David Owino before heading the ball into the back of the net from an Abdallah Juma free kick. Bernard Wanyama sealed the victory for Ingwe in the 73rd minute, after chesting the ball down from an Okwemba lobbed through pass before hitting the cross bar and ending up in the back of the net. The defeat condemned Gor Mahia to their heaviest defeat that season until that point.

== Fans and hooliganism ==
The Gor Mahia fanbase is predominantly Luo while that of AFC leopards is mostly Luhya, making the rivalry partly tribal despite the significant support of "neutrals" (other communities or nationalities) for both clubs. The passion of the fans during encounters between the teams add to the intensity of the derby matches.

Both teams have been involved in cases of hooliganism, but Gor Mahia fans are usually found on the wrong side of the law more often than their A.F.C. Leopards counterparts. After winning their 2013 FKF President's Cup semi-final against Sony Sugar, Gor Mahia fans began celebrating the win, with a huge number of them invading the pitch to attack Sony Sugar players. The incident resulted in Sony Sugar goalkeeper Wycliffe Kasaya being admitted to hospital. Only four days later, the fans attacked Sofapaka officials during a 2013 Kenyan Premier League match. They descended on the club's assistant coach Martin Ndagano and their medic Charles Omondi, forcing them out of the stadium, and making away with the latter's mobile phone in the process.

During a 2014 Kenyan Premier League match against Thika United, A.F.C. Leopards fans descended onto the pitch in the 85th minute in frustration at their side's failure to come back from a 1–0 deficit. The incident cost A.F.C. Leopards the game, as the KPL handed Thika United a 2–0 win and handed A.F.C. Leopards a fine of KSh.500,000/= to be paid by 20 June 2014.

== Major honours ==
Competition	AFC	GOR
Premier League	12	20
President's Cup	11	10
Super Cup	1	3
Top 8 Cup	1	2
National total	25	35
CECAFA Club Cup	5	5
Cup Winners' Cup	0	1
Champions League	0	0
Confederation Cup	0	0
African total	5	6
Total	30	41
