= 2012 Kenyan Super Cup =

Tusker	Gor Mahia
1 (4)	1 (1)
- Date: 5 February 2012
- Venue: Nyayo National Stadium, Nairobi, Kenya
- Man of the Match: Samuel Odhiambo (Tusker)

The 2012 Kenyan Super Cup was a Kenyan football match that was played on 5 February 2012. It was contested by Tusker, the 2011 Kenyan Premier League winners, and Gor Mahia, the 2011 FKL Cup winners.

Tusker won 4-1 on penalties after the match ended 1-1 at full-time for their first title. The team's goalkeeper, Samuel Odhiambo, was awarded Man of the match after saving all but one of Gor Mahia's penalties during the shootout.

In addition to lifting the trophy, Tusker were awarded a KSh.750,000/= cheque prize while Gor Mahia took home KSh.500,000/=.

== Match details ==
5 February 2012
15:00 UTC+3

Tusker	1 – 1	Gor Mahia
Mandela 27'	News; Starting line-ups	Abondo 11'
Penalties
Atudo (penalty scored); Mbugi (penalty scored); Otieno (penalty scored); Mandela (penalty scored)	4 – 1	(penalty missed) Odhiambo; (penalty missed) Mosoti; (penalty scored) Salim

Nyayo National Stadium, Nairobi

Tusker	Gor Mahia

Tusker:
GK	(Kenya) Samuel Odhiambo (c)
RB	(Kenya) Jockins Atudo
CB	(Kenya) Isaac Otieno
CB	(Kenya) Brian Mandela
LB	(Kenya) Humphrey Okoti
CM	(Kenya) Joseph Mbugi
CM	(Kenya) Peter Opiyo
RW	(Kenya) Fredrick Onyango
LW	(Kenya) Fredrick Ojwang'
AM	(Democratic Republic of the Congo) Patrick Kagogo
CF	(Kenya) Paul Were
Substitutes:
GK	(Kenya) Boniface Oluoch
DF	(Kenya) Luke Ochieng'
DF	(Kenya) Noah Abich
MF	(Kenya) James Macharia
FW	(Kenya) Kenneth Wendo
FW	(Kenya) Joseph Emeka
FW	(Kenya) Erasto Ndege
Coach:
(Kenya) Sammy Omollo

Gor Mahia:
GK	(Tanzania) Ivo Mapunda
RB	(Kenya) Musa Mohammed
CB	(Kenya) Yusuf Juma
CB	(Kenya) Donald Mosoti
LB	(Kenya) David Owino
DM	(Kenya) Collins Okoth
CM	(Kenya) Ali Abondo
CM	(Kenya) Rama Salim
RW	(Cameroon) Baldwin Ngwa	(substituted off) 62'
LW	(Kenya) George Midenyo	(substituted off) 45'
CF	(Kenya) Moses Odhiambo (c)
Substitutes:
GK	(Kenya) Wycliffe Kasaya
MF	(Kenya) Anthony Akumu	(substituted in) 62'
MF	(Kenya) Peter Juma
FW	(Kenya) Kevin Ochieng'	(substituted in) 45'
FW	(Democratic Republic of the Congo) Selenga Mangili
FW	(Kenya) Kevin Omondi
Coach:
(Cameroon) Anaba Awono

== See also ==
- 2011 Kenyan Super Cup
- 2012 Kenyan Premier League
- FKF Cup
