= 2013 Kenyan Super Cup (post-season) =

- Event: Kenyan Super Cup
| Gor Mahia | Tusker |
| 1 (3) | 1 (5) |
- Date: 14 December 2013
- Venue: Moi International Sports Centre, Kasarani, Kenya

The second 2013 Kenyan Super Cup was a Kenyan football match contested by the 2013 Kenyan Premier League champions Gor Mahia and the 2013 KPL Top 8 Cup champions Tusker. After the two teams drew 1–1 in regulation time, Tusker won the match 5–3 in the penalty shoot-out.

== Road to Cup ==
=== Kenyan Premier League standings ===
| Pos | Team | Pld | W | D | L | GF | GA | GD | Pts | Qualification or relegation |
|---|---|---|---|---|---|---|---|---|---|---|
| 1 | Gor Mahia (C, Q) | 30 | 17 | 9 | 4 | 32 | 15 | +17 | 60 | Qualification for 2014 CAF Champions League |
| 2 | A.F.C. Leopards (Q) | 30 | 14 | 8 | 8 | 39 | 25 | +14 | 50 | Qualification for 2014 CAF Confederation Cup (Note: A.F.C. Leopards qualified for the 2014 CAF Confederation Cup as winners of the 2013 FKF President's Cup.) |
| 3 | Sofapaka | 30 | 13 | 11 | 6 | 35 | 22 | +13 | 50 | |
| 4 | Kenya Commercial Bank | 30 | 11 | 14 | 5 | 40 | 22 | +18 | 47 | |
| 5 | Tusker | 30 | 10 | 12 | 8 | 30 | 23 | +7 | 42 | |
| 6 | Bandari | 30 | 10 | 12 | 8 | 30 | 28 | +2 | 42 | |
| 7 | Thika United | 30 | 11 | 9 | 10 | 27 | 31 | −4 | 42 | |
| 8 | Ulinzi Stars | 30 | 10 | 11 | 9 | 22 | 21 | +1 | 41 | |
| 9 | Chemelil Sugar | 30 | 10 | 10 | 10 | 27 | 24 | +3 | 40 | |
| 10 | Muhoroni Youth | 30 | 9 | 8 | 13 | 21 | 40 | −19 | 35 | |
| 11 | SoNy Sugar | 30 | 7 | 13 | 10 | 19 | 28 | −9 | 34 | |
| 12 | Western Stima | 30 | 6 | 14 | 10 | 23 | 25 | −2 | 32 | |
| 13 | Mathare United | 30 | 5 | 17 | 8 | 24 | 27 | −3 | 32 | |
| 14 | Nairobi City Stars | 30 | 7 | 11 | 12 | 24 | 36 | −12 | 32 | |
| 15 | Kakamega Homeboyz (R) | 30 | 6 | 11 | 13 | 22 | 29 | −7 | 29 | Relegation to 2014 National Super League |
| 16 | Vegpro (R) | 30 | 4 | 10 | 16 | 17 | 36 | −19 | 22 | Relegation to 2014 National Super League |

Updated to match(es) played on 9 November 2013. Source: Kenyan Premier League
Rules for classification: 1) points; 2) goal difference; 3) number of goals scored.
(C) Champions; (Q) Qualified for the phase indicated; (R) Relegated

=== KPL Top 8 Cup bracket ===
Quarterfinals
Sofapaka | 1 (3)
Thika United | 1 (5)
Chemelil Sugar | 3
A.F.C. Leopards | 2
Ulinzi Stars | 0 (2)
Gor Mahia | 0 (4)
Tusker | 3
Mathare United | 1

Semifinals
Thika United | 0 | 1 | 1 (3)
Chemelil Sugar | 1 | 0 | 1 (2)
Gor Mahia | 0 | 0 | 0
Tusker | 1 | 0 | 0

Finals
Thika United | 2 (3)
Tusker | 2 (5)

== Match details ==
14 December 2013
15:00 UTC+3

| Gor Mahia | 1 – 1 | Tusker |
|---|---|---|
| Oluoch 23'; Mohammed (yellow card) 59'; Ochieng (yellow card) 64' | Report | Wahome (yellow card) 18' (goal) 68' |
Penalties
| Sserunkuma (penalty scored); Owino (penalty scored); Mosoti (penalty scored); Nasio (penalty missed) | 3 – 5 | (penalty scored) I. Salim; (penalty scored) Monday; (penalty scored) C. Alwanga; (penalty scored) B. Alwanga; (penalty scored) Abondo |

Moi International Sports Centre, Kasarani

== See also ==
- 2013 Kenyan Super Cup (pre-season)
- 2012 Kenyan Super Cup
