= Rama Salim =

Kenyan footballer (born 1993)

Personal information
- Full name: Ramadhan Mohammed Salim
- Date of birth: 20 March 1993 (age 33)
- Place of birth: Mombasa, Kenya
- Positions: Striker; attacking midfielder

Team information
- Current team: MFK Topolcany

Senior career*
| Years | Team | Apps | (Gls) |
| 2010–2011 | Congo JMJ United | | |
| 2011–2014 | Gor Mahia | | |
| 2013 | → Al-Markhiya (loan) | | |
| 2014– | Coastal Union | | |

International career^{‡}
| 2011– | Kenya | 7 | (1) |
- * Club domestic league appearances and goals as of 17 August 2014 ‡ National team caps and goals as of 9 July 2013

Ramadhan Mohammed "Rama" Salim (born 20 March 1993 in Mombasa) is a Kenyan footballer who plays for Slovakia Third division side MFK Topolcany and the Kenya national team as a striker or an attacking midfielder.

== Club career ==
=== Congo JMJ United ===
Salim began his career at Mombasa-based club Congo JMJ United, and was an integral part of the side when they won promotion to the Kenyan Premier League for the 2011 season. After a fantastic season that saw him win the KPL Young Player of the Year award, Salim signed a three-year deal with Gor Mahia, ending weeks of transfer speculation surrounding the player that included clubs such as A.F.C. Leopards, Mathare United, Tusker and Ulinzi Stars.

=== Gor Mahia ===
After joining K'Ogalo for the 2012 season, Salim made his debut for the club in a friendly match against Sudanese side Al-Merrikh at the Nyayo National Stadium on 29 January 2012. He made his league debut for the side against Thika United on 12 February 2012, coming on for Dan Makori in the 79th minute to help his side to a 2–0 win. On 10 November 2012, the last day of the season, after Gor Mahia were held to a 1–1 draw by Thika United at the Nairobi City Stadium when they needed a win to clinch the title, Salim made headlines when he sat down on the pitch and cried bitterly at the end of the match. However, he helped the side win the pre-season edition of the 2013 Kenyan Super Cup the following year.

==== Loan to Al-Markhiya ====
On 11 August 2013, Salim left Kenya for Qatar to sign a season-long loan deal with Qatargas League side Al-Markhiya until June 2014, when he will then move to Qatari Stars League club Al-Gharafa, for a reported KSh.5.2 million/= (approx. US$59,700, £35,500 sterling or €43,400). It was also reported that the deal would earn Salim US$240,000 a season (or US$20,000 a month).

On 20 September 2013, Salim was banned by the club for two months for gross misconduct, following a training session fight with a teammate after receiving a hard tackle.

==== Return to Gor Mahia ====
On 6 January 2014, Salim was recalled to Gor Mahia after six months in Qatar, and signed a new six-month contract with the club, after which he will be allowed to leave the club or sign a contract extension. He played his first match since returning to Kenya in a friendly match against Mumbi Nationale on 25 January 2014.

On 20 February 2014, Salim made his return to the Kenyan Premier League against the Nairobi City Stars, coming off the bench in the 66th minute for Jared Obwoge to help his side win the match 2–0.

=== Coastal Union ===
On 17 August 2014, it was announced that Salim joined Tanzanian club Coastal Union on a two-year contract. He scored a brace in his first match for the club on 5 September 2014, helping his side to a massive 10–0 friendly win over Zanzibar club Falcons. On 21 September, Salim scored again in his competitive debut for the club, netting in the 81st minute to rescue a point in the club's first league match of the season against Simba.

== International career ==
Salim received his first call-up to the Kenya national team on 20 June 2011 for the LG Cup match against Sudan on 25 June. He was also part of the squad that finished second in the 2012 CECAFA Cup held in Uganda. He came on in the 49th minute for Clifton Miheso during the final, but could not help prevent his side from falling to a 2–1 loss against the hosts.

== Honours ==
=== Club ===
Gor Mahia

- FKF President's Cup: 2011, 2012
- Kenyan Super Cup: 2013 (pre-season)
- KPL Top 8 Cup: 2012

=== Individual ===
- KPL Young Player of the Year: 2011
