= 2011 Kenyan Premier League =

Kenya Premier League season

Kenyan Premier League
- Season: 2011
- Champions: Tusker; 4th Premier League title 9th Kenyan title overall
- Relegated: Bandari; Congo JMJ United
- Champions League: Tusker
- Confederation Cup: Gor Mahia (cup winner)
- Top 8 Cup: Tusker; Ulinzi Stars; Sofapaka; Gor Mahia; A.F.C. Leopards; Sony Sugar; Rangers; Chemelil Sugar
- Matches played: 240
- Goals scored: 488 (2.03 per match)
- Top goalscorer: Hugo Nzangu; Sony Sugar; 10 goals
- Biggest home win: Sofapaka 5–0 Congo JMJ United (22 May 2011); Sofapaka 5–0 Western Stima (10 September 2011)
- Biggest away win: Congo JMJ United 0–4 Rangers (10 July 2011)
- Highest scoring: Nairobi City Stars 4-2 Karuturi Sports (26 November 2011)

The 2011 Kenyan Premier League was the eighth season of the Kenyan Premier League since it was established in 2003 and the forty-eighth season of top division football in Kenya since 1963. It began on 26 February with Rangers and Gor Mahia and ended on 26 November with Ulinzi Stars and Rangers.

Ulinzi Stars were the defending champions, but Tusker eventually won the league, their ninth ever title since 1963. However, Sofapaka, the 2010 FKF Cup champions, took home the 2011 Kenyan Super Cup after beating Ulinzi Stars 1-0.

A total of 16 teams competed for the league. Bandari and Congo JMJ United were both promoted and eventually relegated, taking the places of Red Berets and Mahakama.

Gor Mahia versus AFC Leopards on 24 July 2011 had an attendance of 23,734, the highest of the league that year. The 2011 KPL drew an average attendance of 2,452 per match.

== Changes from last season ==
Relegated from Premier League

- Mahakama
- Red Berets

Promoted from Nationwide League

- Bandari
- Congo JMJ United

== Teams ==
=== Stadia and locations ===
Locations of the 2011 Kenyan Premier League teams.
* 1 - The location marked for Thika United is the location of the town, not the stadium.
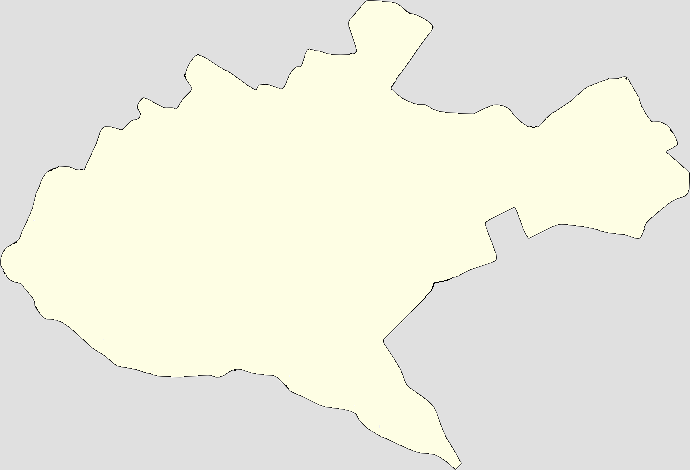
Locations of the 2011 Kenyan Premier League teams within Nairobi.

Team	Location	Stadium	Capacity
A.F.C. Leopards	Nairobi	Nyayo National Stadium	30,000
Bandari	Mombasa	Mombasa Municipal Stadium	10,000
Chemelil Sugar	Chemelil	Chemelil Sports Complex	5,000
Congo JMJ United	Mombasa	Mombasa Municipal Stadium	10,000
Gor Mahia	Nairobi	Nairobi City Stadium	15,000
Karuturi Sports	Naivasha	Naivasha Stadium	5,000
KCB	Nairobi	Nairobi City Stadium	15,000
Mathare United	Nairobi	Kasarani Stadium	60,000
Nairobi City Stars	Nairobi	Hope Centre	5,000
Rangers	Nairobi	Nyayo National Stadium	30,000
Sofapaka	Nairobi	Nyayo National Stadium	30,000
Sony Sugar	Awendo	Green Stadium	5,000
Thika United	Thika	Thika Municipal Stadium	5,000
Tusker	Nairobi	Kasarani Stadium	60,000
Ulinzi Stars	Nakuru	Afraha Stadium	8,200
Western Stima	Kakamega	Bukhungu Stadium	5,000

== League table ==
Pos	Team	Pld	W	D	L	GF	GA	GD	Pts	Qualification or relegation
1	Tusker (C, Q)	30	17	7	6	34	17	+17	58	Qualification for 2012 CAF Champions League
2	Ulinzi Stars	30	16	9	5	38	20	+18	57	
3	Sofapaka	30	15	7	8	42	23	+19	52	
4	Gor Mahia (Q)	30	12	12	6	27	22	+5	48	Qualification for 2012 CAF Confederation Cup (Note: Gor Mahia as winners of the 2011 FKL Cup qualified for the 2012 CAF Confederation Cup.)
5	A.F.C. Leopards	30	13	7	10	36	27	+9	46	
6	SoNy Sugar	30	13	5	12	33	33	0	44	
7	Rangers	30	11	10	9	33	31	+2	43	
8	Chemelil Sugar	30	10	11	9	30	27	+3	41	
9	Kenya Commercial Bank	30	11	7	12	38	32	+6	40	
10	Thika United	30	11	6	13	36	39	−3	39	
11	Western Stima	30	9	10	11	21	28	−7	37	
12	Mathare United	30	7	13	10	32	35	−3	34	
13	Karuturi Sports	30	8	10	12	20	28	−8	34	
14	Nairobi City Stars	30	8	7	15	28	35	−7	31	
15	Bandari (R)	30	9	4	17	22	39	−17	31	Relegation to 2012 FKF Division One
16	Congo JMJ United (R)	30	5	5	20	18	52	−34	20	Relegation to 2012 FKF Division One

Updated to match(es) played on 16 December 2011. Source: 2011 Kenyan Premier League
Rules for classification: 1) points; 2) goal difference; 3) number of goals scored.
(C) Champions; (Q) Qualified for the phase indicated; (R) Relegated

== Results ==
Home \ Away	AFC	BND	CHM	CJMJ	GOR	KRT	KCB	MAU	NCS	RAN	SOF	SNY	THU	TUS	ULS	WST
A.F.C. Leopards		2–0	1–1	4–0	3–0	1–0	0–1	2–2	2–1	3–1	3–1	1–2	0–2	1–2	1–0	1–0
Bandari	0–0		1–2	3–2	1–0	1–0	0–0	0–1	4–1	1–0	1–3	1–0	1–0	0–1	0–2	1–0
Chemelil Sugar	1–1	0–0		1–0	0–1	2–0	3–2	1–1	0–0	3–0	0–0	2–0	4–1	0–3	0–0	0–0
Congo JMJ United	1–0	0–0	1–0		2–2	1–2	0–1	1–1	1–0	0–4	0–1	1–4	3–0	1–2	1–2	0–1
Gor Mahia	3–1	1–0	0–0	1–2		1–1	2–2	1–1	0–1	3–1	0–0	2–1	1–0	0–0	1–0	1–0
Karuturi Sports	0–0	0–1	0–1	2–0	1–1		1–0	1–1	1–0	0–1	1–0	1–0	0–1	1–1	1–1	0–0
Kenya Commercial Bank	0–0	4–1	1–2	4–0	0–1	0–1		3–2	2–0	2–2	0–1	2–0	3–2	1–2	0–1	0–1
Mathare United	1–0	3–0	0–0	1–0	0–0	3–0	2–3		0–0	0–0	3–1	1–0	1–1	1–1	0–1	3–3
Nairobi City Stars	1–2	2–1	0–2	4–0	0–1	4–2	3–1	2–0		1–1	1–0	0–3	0–1	0–1	1–2	0–0
Rangers	0–0	1–0	2–0	0–0	3–0	1–0	1–3	0–0	2–1		1–3	3–0	1–0	1–1	1–1	0–0
Sofapaka	3–1	2–0	3–2	5–0	0–0	0–0	0–0	2–1	0–0	0–2		1–2	4–1	1–0	2–0	5–0
SoNy Sugar	0–3	3–2	2–1	1–1	1–0	3–2	1–0	3–1	0–0	2–0	0–1		1–0	0–2	0–0	1–0
Thika United	1–2	3–0	1–0	2–0	1–3	3–1	1–2	4–1	2–1	1–1	2–1	1–1		0–2	1–1	1–1
Tusker	2–0	1–0	2–1	1–0	0–0	0–0	0–0	2–1	2–1	1–2	0–1	1–0	0–1		1–2	1–0
Ulinzi Stars	0–1	3–1	4–1	2–0	0–0	0–0	1–1	2–0	1–2	3–0	2–1	1–0	1–1	1–0		2–1
Western Stima	1–0	2–1	0–0	1–0	0–1	0–1	1–0	1–0	1–1	2–1	0–0	2–2	2–1	0–2	1–2	

Updated to match(es) played on 16 December 2011. Source: Kenyan Premier League
Legend: Blue = home team win; Yellow = draw; Red = away team win.

== Top scorers ==
Kenyan Premier League: Top 10 Scorers As of December 16, 2011.

Rank	Player	Club	Goals
1	(Kenya) Stephen Waruru	Ulinzi Stars	12
2	(Kenya) Mike Baraza	A.F.C. Leopards	11
2	(Kenya) Hugo Nzangu	Sony Sugar	11
2	(Kenya) Kevin Kimani	Mathare United	11
2	(Kenya) Clifford Alwanga	KCB	11
3	(Democratic Republic of the Congo) Bob Mugalia	Sofapaka	8
4	(Kenya) Aloys Mangi	Western Stima	7
5	(Uganda) Dan Sserunkuma	Nairobi City Stars	6
5	(Kenya) Humphrey Mieno	Sofapaka	6
5	(Kenya) Francis Kahata	Thika United	6
5	(Kenya) Moses Arita	Thika United	6

Last updated: 16 December 2011
Source: 2011 Kenyan Premier League: Top Scorers

== See also ==
- 2011 DStv Super Cup
- 2011 KPL Top 8 Cup
- 2011 Kenyan Super Cup
