= Robert Matano =

Kenyan footballer (born 1964)

Personal information
- Full name: Robert Matano
- Date of birth: 6 April 1964 (age 62)
- Position: Defender

Team information
- Current team: Kenya Commercial Bank S.C (head coach)

Managerial career
- Years: Team
- 2005–2007: World Hope FC
- 2008-2010: Sofapaka F.C.
- 2010-2011: AFC Leopards
- 2012-2013: Tusker F.C.
- 2014-2016: Ulinzi Stars
- 2017: AFC Leopards
- 2018-: Tusker F.C.

Robert Matano is a former Kenyan footballer, and currently the head coach at Kenya Premier League side Kenya Commercial Bank

Matano is a four-time Kenyan Premier League winning coach having won the title with Sofapaka F.C. on their debut season in 2009, and with Tusker F.C. in the 2012, 2020–21, and 2021–22 seasons.

== Career ==
Matano was a defender who turned out for Abeingo, Nakuru Youth Olympic, Hakati FC, Kenatco FC then AFC Leopards.

After ten years of playing, he moved to coaching starting out at Pumwani Sportif in 1986. The list of teams he coached thereafter till the year 2000 includes; Kenya Pipeline, Shamako Babes, Bayer East Africa, Safari Park, Timsales, Kimbo FC, and Re-Union.

From the year 2005, he coached topflight sides including promoted World Hope, Sofapaka, AFC Leopards, Ulinzi Stars, and Tusker over two stints. He was named the coach of the month in June 2021, and was picked as the coach of the year at the close of the 2020–21 season to add on to a similar award earned in 2009.

== Kenya National team ==
Matano made it to the national fold as an assistant coach to the Kenya National team in 2006.

== Honours ==
World Hope

- FKF President's Cup: 2005

Sofapaka

- Kenyan Premier League: 2009

Tusker

- Kenyan Premier League: 2012, 2020–21, 2021–22
- Kenyan Super Cup: 2021–22

AFC Leopards

- FKF President's Cup: 2017

Individual

- Coach of the Year: 2009, 2020–21
- Coach of the Month: June 2021
