= 2013 Kenyan Super Cup (pre-season) =

- Event: Kenyan Super Cup
Tusker	Gor Mahia
0	0
- Gor Mahia won 5–4 on penalties
- Date: 23 February 2013
- Venue: Nyayo National Stadium, Nairobi, Kenya
- Referee: Sylvester Kirwa

The first 2013 Kenyan Super Cup was a Kenyan football match which was contested by 2012 Kenyan Premier League champions Tusker and 2012 FKF President's Cup champions Gor Mahia at the Nyayo National Stadium in Nairobi on 23 February. The latter won the match 5–4 on penalties to win the match and the trophy.

== Road to Cup ==
=== 2012 Kenyan Premier League standings ===
Pos	Team	Pld	W	D	L	GF	GA	GD	Pts	Qualification or relegation
1	Tusker (C, Q)	30	17	9	4	39	14	+25	60	Qualification for 2013 CAF Champions League
2	Gor Mahia (Q)	30	17	8	5	37	18	+19	59	Qualification for 2013 CAF Confederation Cup (Note: Gor Mahia qualified for the 2013 CAF Confederation Cup as winners of the 2012 FKF President's Cup.)
3	A.F.C. Leopards	30	17	6	7	45	27	+18	57	
4	Sofapaka	30	13	9	8	34	24	+10	48	
5	Thika United	30	12	10	8	36	33	+3	46	
6	Ulinzi Stars	30	13	6	11	35	29	+6	45	
7	Chemelil Sugar	30	9	14	7	18	17	+1	41	
8	Mathare United	30	10	11	9	36	36	0	41	
9	Western Stima	30	11	7	12	27	25	+2	40	
10	Kenya Commercial Bank	30	11	6	13	35	31	+4	39	
11	Sony Sugar	30	11	5	14	26	26	0	38	
12	Karuturi Sports	30	7	11	12	18	26	−8	32	
13	Nairobi City Stars	30	6	11	13	16	32	−16	29	
14	Muhoroni Youth	30	7	6	17	19	34	−15	27	
15	Oserian (R)	30	5	9	16	15	33	−18	24	Relegation to 2013 FKF Division One
16	Rangers (R)	30	4	12	14	22	53	−31	24	Relegation to 2013 FKF Division One

Updated to match(es) played on 10 November 2012. Source: Kenyan Premier League
Rules for classification: 1) points; 2) goal difference; 3) number of goals scored.
(C) Champions; (Q) Qualified for the phase indicated; (R) Relegated

=== 2012 FKF President's Cup bracket ===
The FKF decided to change the quarter-final fixtures, meaning that A.F.C. Leopards and Kenya Revenue Authority were now to face Karuturi Sports and Sofapaka respectively.

Second round
Gor Mahia	5
Borabu Chiefs	2
Buruburu Sacramento	0
Western Stima	2
Muhoroni Youth	3
West Kenya Sugar	0
Kakamega Homeboyz	2
Bidco United	0
Congo JMJ United	3
Isiolo Youth	1
A.F.C. Leopards	2
Mathare United	0
Sofapaka	3
Ulinzi Stars	0
Longonot Horticulture	1
Mahakama	3
Murang'a United	0
Wamo	1
Tusker	4
Keroka Technical	0
Tetu Stars	0
Talanta	2
Raiply	0
Nzoia United	2
Wazito	2
MOYAS	0
K.R.A.	2
Malindi United	0
Karuturi Sports	4
Nakumatt	0
Nairobi Stima	2
Shabana Kisii	0

Third round
Gor Mahia	1 (5)
Western Stima	1 (4)
Muhoroni Youth	2
Kakamega Homeboyz	1
Congo JMJ United	1
A.F.C. Leopards	3
Sofapaka	4
Mahakama	2
Wamo	0
Tusker	13
Talanta	2
Nzoia United	0
Wazito	1
K.R.A.	2
Karuturi Sports	0 (4)
Nairobi Stima	0 (3)

Quarter-finals
Gor Mahia	0 (4)
Muhoroni Youth	0 (2)
A.F.C. Leopards	3
Karuturi Sports	1
Tusker	2
Talanta	0
K.R.A.	1
Sofapaka	2

Semi-finals
Gor Mahia	2
A.F.C. Leopards	1
Tusker	0
Sofapaka	1

Final
Gor Mahia	0 (3)
Sofapaka	0 (0)

== Match details ==
23 February 2013
16:00 UTC+3

Tusker	0–0	Gor Mahia
Oluoch (red card) 3'	Report
Penalties
Ochieng (penalty scored); Awisho (penalty scored); Were (penalty scored); Odipo (penalty missed); Omunik (penalty missed); Shikokoti (penalty scored); Kizza (penalty missed)	4–5	(penalty scored) Omondi; (penalty scored) Sserunkuma; (penalty scored) Lavatsa; (penalty missed) Odhiambo; (penalty missed) Emuge; (penalty scored) Nasio; (penalty scored) Mosoti

Nyayo National Stadium, Nairobi
Referee: Sylvester Kirwa

== See also ==
- 2013 Kenyan Super Cup (post-season)
- 2012 Kenyan Super Cup
