= Jerim Onyango =

Kenyan footballer

Personal information
- Full name: Fredrick Jerim Onyango Oduor
- Date of birth: 18 November 1984 (age 41)
- Place of birth: Ugunja, Kenya
- Position: Goalkeeper

Team information
- Current team: Gor Mahia
- Number: 1

Senior career*
Years	Team	Apps	(Gls)
2006–2008	K.R.A.		
2008–2017	Gor Mahia		

International career^{‡}
2013–	Kenya	4	(0)
- * Club domestic league appearances and goals as of 8 May 2014 ‡ National team caps and goals as of 9 January 2017

Fredrick Jerim Onyango Oduor (born 18 November 1984 in Ugunja, Siaya), commonly known as Jerim Onyango, is a Kenyan footballer who plays for Kenyan Premier League side Gor Mahia as a goalkeeper, and also serves as the club's captain. He has also appeared for the Kenya national team, and was part of the squad that won the 2013 CECAFA Cup.

Onyango is known as "Jerry Jagoal" among Gor Mahia fans.

== Club career ==
After graduating from Kamukunji High School in Nairobi, Onyango began his professional career at K.R.A. in 2006, who at the time were competing in the now defunct Nationwide League, before joining Gor Mahia two years later. He has been K'Ogalo's first-choice keeper since the beginning of the 2009 season, after Jacktone Odhiambo left the club for Ulinzi Stars. He captained the side to their first league title in 18 years in 2013.

== International career ==
Onyango had received several call-ups to the Kenya national team since early 2011, but had to wait until 9 July 2013 to make his international debut when he started in his nation's 2013 COSAFA Cup match against Swaziland. He kept a clean sheet to help his side to a 2–0 victory.

Onyango was named in the squad that was to take part in the 2013 CECAFA Cup on home soil, but did not play a single game as he watched his side clinch their 6th title from the sidelines.

== Honours ==
=== Club ===
Gor Mahia

- Kenyan Premier League: 2013, 2014, 2015
- KFF Cup/FKL Cup/President's Cup: 2008, 2011, 2012
- Kenyan Super Cup: 2009, 2013 (pre-season), 2015
- KPL Top 8 Cup: 2012

=== International ===
- CECAFA Cup: 2013

=== Individual ===
- KPL Goalkeeper of the Year: 2013
