= 2010 Kenyan Super Cup =

Sofapaka	A.F.C. Leopards
1	0
- Date: 31 January 2010
- Venue: Nyayo National Stadium, Nairobi
- Attendance: 30,000

The 2010 Kenyan Super Cup was the second edition of the tournament, a Kenyan football match that was contested by 2009 Kenyan Premier League winners Sofapaka and 8-time FKl Cup champions A.F.C. Leopards.

Sofapaka defeated A.F.C. Leopards 1-0 for their first Super Cup title.

== Match details ==
31 January 2012
15:00 UTC+3

Sofapaka	1 – 0	A.F.C. Leopards
Mieno 19'	News

Nyayo National Stadium, Nairobi
Attendance: 30,000

== See also ==
- 2009 Kenyan Super Cup
- 2011 Kenyan Super Cup
- Kenyan Premier League
- FKF Cup
