= Frank Nuttall =

Frank Nuttall may refer to:

- Frank Nuttall (priest) (1870–1943), English priest
- Frank Nuttall (footballer) (born 1961), Scottish football coach and player
