= 2013 Kenyan Super Cup =

2013 Kenyan Super Cup may refer to:

- 2013 Kenyan Super Cup (pre-season), a match played by Tusker F.C. and Gor Mahia F.C. on 23 February 2013
- 2013 Kenyan Super Cup (post-season), a match played by Gor Mahia F.C. and Tusker F.C. on 14 December 2013
