= Ibrahim Shikanda =

Kenyan footballer (born 1984)

Personal information
- Full name: Ibrahim Shikanda Chimwanga
- Date of birth: 27 August 1984 (age 42)
- Place of birth: Nairobi, Kenya
- Height: 1.62 m (5 ft 4 in)
- Position: Defender

Senior career*
Years	Team	Apps	(Gls)
2003–2005	Tusker FC	25	(4)
2005–2007	Mumias Sugar	20	(2)
2007–2008	Rock Star Tororo	12	(2)
2008–2013	Azam FC		

International career
2006–2010	Kenya	16	(0)
- * Club domestic league appearances and goals

Ibrahim Shikanda Chimwanga (born 27 August 1984) is a Kenyan former footballer who works as assistant coach of Tanzanian Premier League side Azam FC

== Club career ==
Shikanda was born in Nairobi. A defender, he began his career in the youth side for Tusker FC and was 2003 promoted to the seniorside. After two years for Tusker in the Kenyan Premier League joined to league rival Mumias Sugar. He left than in summer 2007 his club Mumias Sugar to sign for Uganda's Rock Star. Shikanda signed for Azam FC at the beginning of 2008. In 2012, Shikanda signed for up-and-coming Conference Premier side Kettering Town.

== International career ==
Shikanda has come through Kenya's ranks having featured for the U17, U20 and U23 sides before making it to the Senior team - Harambee Stars.
