= Betika =

Kenya-based online gaming firm

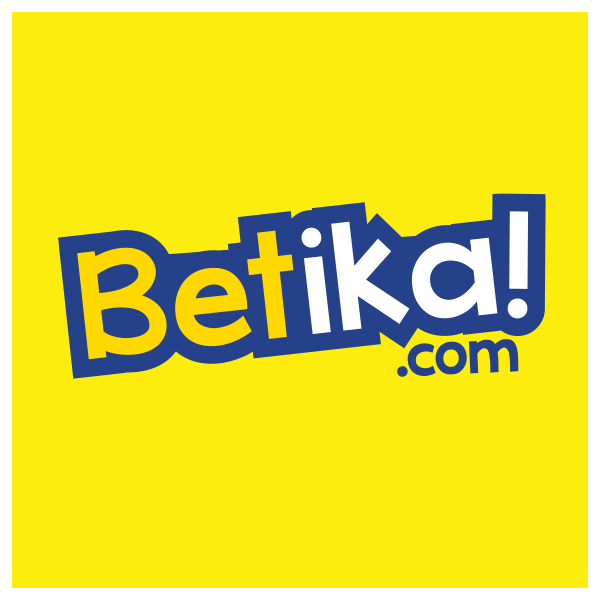
- Type: Private
- Industry: Lotteries and gaming
- Founded: 2016; 10 years ago
- Headquarters: Nairobi, Kenya
- Area served: Global
- Key people: Robinson Mutua Mutava, CEO
- Products: Sports betting, casino, virtuals, e-sports betting
- Total equity: Shop and Deliver Limited
- Number of employees: 500
- Parent: Shop and Deliver Limited
- Website: www.betika.com

Betika is an online gaming firm based in Nairobi, Kenya, with operations in Kenya, Tanzania, Ethiopia, DRC, Ghana, Nigeria, Mozambique, Zambia, Uganda and Malawi. Its products include sportsbook betting, casino, virtual games, crash games and e-sports betting.

== History ==
Betika was founded in April 2016 and initially offered sportsbook betting only through SMS. USSD betting followed shortly after, and online betting was introduced in August 2016. its headquarters are found in Nairobi.

In November 2018, Betika unveiled Brazilian football legend Ronaldinho as their Brand ambassador. Ronaldinho visited Kenya, attending charity events and exhibition football matches in a campaign called "Bet on yourself".

In 2019 Betika became Kenya's market leader in the gaming industry. In the same year, Betika launched Betika Na Community, an initiative used to run all its CSR programs. Through this initiative, the company has invested in various sports, such as football, cricket, athletics, motorsports, taekwondo, and mountain climbing, at both national and grassroots levels. Betika has provided equipment, renovated pitches, and sponsored teams, sportspersons, and events. The company has sponsored Kenyan Premier League sides A.F.C. Leopards, Police FC, and Sofapaka F.C..

In 2023, Betika became the first Kenyan betting firm to have its app on the Play Store.

== Sports involvement ==
Betika was the title sponsor of the National Super League, Kenya's second division league, for three years between 2018 and 2021. The company has also sponsored the Rugby 7s, WRC teams, and the first-ever Kenyan Rallycross.

In 2020, Betika expanded its operations into other African countries, now operating in nine countries, including Kenya, Ethiopia, DRC, Ghana, Malawi, Mozambique, Nigeria, Tanzania, and Zambia.

In 2021, Betika sponsored 62-year-old James Kagambi to climb Mount Everest, making him the first-ever native Kenyan to summit the world's highest mountain.

In 2022, Betika launched the biggest jackpot in Kenya, standing at Ksh 200 million, playable with a stake of Ksh 49. The jackpot has since produced two winners, Eli Kipruto and Moses Kiprono.

== Ownership ==
Betika is owned by Shop and Deliver Limited, a company with Kenyan shareholders.
