= Joseph Ochuka =

Kenyan footballer

Joseph Okoth Ochuka is a Kenyan goalkeeper currently in the ranks of Kenyan Premier League side Tusker, and Kenya national football team.

Ochuka joined Tusker in the offseason ahead of the 2024-25 FKF Premier league season from Bandari. He formerly turned out for KCB.
