= George Owino =

Kenyan footballer

Personal information
- Full name: George Owino Audi
- Date of birth: 24 April 1981 (age 45)
- Place of birth: Nairobi, Kenya
- Height: 1.93 m (6 ft 4 in)
- Position: Defender

Team information
- Current team: Sofapaka
- Number: 25

Youth career
- 2002–2004: Tusker

Senior career*
| Years | Team | Apps | (Gls) |
| 2004–2007 | Tusker | 111 | (7) |
| 2007–2008 | Simba | 20 | (4) |
| 2008 | Saint-George SA | 11 | (1) |
| 2009 | Fortuna Düsseldorf | 0 | (0) |
| 2009 | Young Africans | | |
| 2010– | Sofapaka | | |

International career^{‡}
| 2005– | Kenya | 16 | (1) |
- * Club domestic league appearances and goals as of 23 August 2008 ‡ National team caps and goals as of 1 October 2007

George Owino Audi (born 24 April 1981 in Nairobi) was a Kenyan footballer who played for Sofapaka in the Kenyan Premier League.

== Career ==
Owino had been playing for Simba SC in Tanzania since 2007. Before moving to Tanzania, he played for Tusker FC. In July 2008 he joined Saint-George SA. In July 2009 he was invited to train with Fortuna Düsseldorf on advice from Antoine Hey, his dream is to play in Europe. On 28 July 2009 he signed for Fortuna Düsseldorf. His transfer failed and he re-signed for Saint-George SA, he signed then on 18 August 2009 with Tanzanian club Young Africans FC. On 1 July 2010 he left Young Africans FC, returned to Kenya, and signed for Sofapaka.

== International career ==
Owino is member of the Kenya national football team and played 16 games here.

== Controversy ==
In February 2019 Owino was named in a FIFA report that alleged he had been involved in match fixing. In April 2019 he was one of four African former international footballers banned for life by FIFA due to "match manipulation".
