= 2011 Kenyan Super Cup =

Ulinzi Stars	Sofapaka
0	1
- Date: 20 February 2011
- Venue: Nyayo National Stadium, Nairobi, Kenya

The 2011 Kenyan Super Cup was the third edition of the tournament. The Kenyan football match, played on 20 February 2011, saw Ulinzi Stars, the 2010 Kenyan Premier League winners, face off against Sofapaka, the 2010 FKL Cup winners.

Sofapaka won the match 1-0 for their second consecutive title.

== Match details ==
5 February 2012
15:00 UTC+3

Ulinzi Stars	0 – 1	Sofapaka
	News	Baraza 13'

Nyayo National Stadium, Nairobi
Attendance: 30,000

== See also ==
- 2010 Kenyan Super Cup
- 2012 Kenyan Super Cup
- Kenyan Premier League
- FKF Cup
