= Kenyan District Leagues =

- Folded: 2013
- Country: Kenya
- Confederation: CAF
- Promotion to: County Leagues
- Domestic cup: President's Cup

The Kenyan District Leagues were the fifth and lowest tier in the Kenyan football league system. They had a promotion and relegation system with the Kenyan County Leagues, and were divided into several interconnected divisions that spanned over the districts of Kenya. They were scrapped at the end of the 2013 season in line with the introduction of a new six-tier system by the Football Kenya Federation on 10 July 2013.

== See also ==
- Kenyan football league system
