= 2009 Kenyan Super Cup =

Mathare United	Gor Mahia
0	3
- Date: 24 January 2009
- Venue: Moi International Sports Centre, Nairobi
- Attendance: 30,000

The 2009 Kenyan Super Cup was the inaugural edition of the tournament. The Kenyan football match-up pitted 2008 Kenyan Premier League champions Mathare United against 2008 FKF Cup winners Gor Mahia, who won their ninth title in the tournament.

Mathare United were thrashed 3–0, giving Gor Mahia the first ever Super Cup.

== Match details ==
24 January 2009
15:00 UTC+3

Mathare United	0 – 3	Gor Mahia
	News	H. Otieno 14', 46'; Gemet ?'

Moi International Sports Centre, Nairobi
Attendance: 30,000

== See also ==
- 2010 Kenyan Super Cup
- Kenyan Premier League
- FKF Cup
