= Sammy Sholei =

Kenyan footballer (born 1967)

Sammy Sholei Tiyoi (born 18 May 1967) is a Kenyan former footballer who played as a midfielder. He made five appearances for the Kenya national team.

Sholei began his football career in Kitale town, in the Rift Valley Province.

He played for Rivatex and Raymonds FC (both now defunct) before moving to Kenya Breweries FC (now renamed Tusker FC).

Sholei was part of the Kenya Breweries FC team that reached the finals of the CAF Cup Winners' Cup in 1994 that failed to hang onto a 2–2 away draw to succumb to a shocking 3–0 loss at the hands of Zaire's DC Motema Pembe in the return tie in Nairobi. He retired from club and international football in 1997.

He was also a Kenya national football team player, having earned his first call up under coach Mohamed Kheri back in 1991. He earned 20 Caps for Kenya, including appearances against Algeria in 1998 FIFA World Cup qualifying on 2 and 14 June 1996.

Sholei is currently the Chief Executive Officer of an IT firm E-World Communications, which he founded in 2005 that offers IT Consultancy.

In 2008, Sholei became an online journalist for a Kenyan soccer website KenyaFootball.
