= Eldoret KCC =

Kenyan football club

- Full name: Eldoret KCC Football Club
- Nickname(s): KCC
- Ground: Kipchoge Keino Stadium
- Capacity: 10,000
- Chairman: Kenya Co-operative Creamery 2000 Limited
- Head coach: ?

KCC was an association football club based in Eldoret, Kenya. In 1997 the team won the Moi Golden Cup by beating AFC Leopards 4–1 in Nyayo Stadium and 1998 was the 1st runner-up when they were beaten by Mathare United 2–1.

KCC used to share Kipchoge Keino Stadium with Rivatex. The Eldoret derby was a sweet rivalry between the two teams.
