= 2007–08 in Kenyan football =

2007–08 in Kenyan football may refer to:

- 2007 in Kenyan football
- 2008 in Kenyan football
