= Fred Ambani =

Kenyan footballer

Fred Ambani is a former Kenyan international forward who serves as the head coach of Kenyan Premier League side AFC Leopards. Ambani formerly coached Wazito FC.

In his playing days, Ambani turned out for, among others, Oserian FC, AFC Leopards, Nakuru FC, Kenya Pipeline FC, Chemelil Sugar FC, and the Kenya national football team.
