= Mark Sirengo =

Kenyan footballer (born 1974)

Personal information
- Full name: Mark Sirengo Mabwete
- Date of birth: 2 July 1974 (age 52)
- Position: Midfielder

Senior career*
Years	Team	Apps	(Gls)
1997–1998	Eldoret KCC		
1999–2001	Mumias Sugar		
2002–2003	Simba		
2004	APR		
2004–2007	Mumias Sugar		
2007–2009	ATRACO		
2009–2013	Western Stima	57+	(4+)

International career
1999–2005	Kenya	41	(7)
- * Club domestic league appearances and goals

Mark Sirengo Mabwete (born 2 July 1974) is a Kenyan former international footballer who played as a midfielder. He was capped 41 times by the Kenya national team and scored 7 goals. He played club football for Eldoret KCC, Mumias Sugar, Simba, APR, ATRACO and Western Stima.
