= Boniface Oluoch =

Kenyan footballer

Personal information
- Full name: Boniface Oluoch Otieno
- Date of birth: 22 December 1986 (age 39)
- Place of birth: Nairobi, Kenya
- Height: 1.88 m (6 ft 2 in)
- Position: Goalkeeper

Team information
- Current team: Gor Mahia

Senior career*
Years	Team	Apps	(Gls)
2009–2014	Tusker		
2015–	Gor Mahia		

International career^{‡}
2010–	Kenya	29	(0)
- * Club domestic league appearances and goals as of 20:37, 12 March 2020 (UTC) ‡ National team caps and goals as of 20:37, 12 March 2020 (UTC)

Boniface Oluoch Otieno (born 22 December 1986) is a Kenyan international footballer who plays for Gor Mahia, as a goalkeeper.

== Career ==
Born in Nairobi, Oluoch has played club football for Tusker and Gor Mahia.

He made his international debut for Kenya in 2010.
