= Frank Nuttall (footballer) =

Scottish footballer, manager and UEFA Pro Licence Head Coach

Personal information
- Date of birth: 4 May 1968 (age 58)
- Place of birth: Hamilton, Scotland

Youth career
- Celtic

Senior career*
Years	Team	Apps	(Gls)
1985–1987	Celtic		

Managerial career
- 1998-2000: West Bromwich Albion (fitness coach)
- 2004–2006: Rangers (fitness coach)
- 2006: Al-Nasr (assistant coach)
- 2007–2008: St. Mirren (fitness coach)
- 2008–2009: Middlesbrough (fitness coach)
- 2010–2012: China (assistant coach)
- 2012–2013: Hibernian (consultant coach)
- 2014: Qingdao Huanghai (assistant coach)
- 2014–2016: Gor Mahia
- 2016: Zamalek (assistant)
- 2017–2018: Hearts of Oak
- 2018–2019: El-Hilal El-Obeid
- 2020: Township Rollers
- 2021: Saint George
- 2021–2022: Police FC
- * Club domestic league appearances and goals

Frank Nuttall (born 4 May 1968) is a Scottish football coach and former player.

== Playing career ==
Nuttall was a player at Celtic, playing in the reserve and youth teams, before studying at Cardiff Metropolitan University and Loughborough University to gain master's and bachelor's degree in sports science and physical education .

== Coaching career ==
=== UK and Asia ===
At age 24, he started his career by coach educating for the Welsh FA and coaching their Under-14 and Under-15 sides.

In 1998, he became fitness coach of West Bromwich Albion FC and pursued his management and coaching career by studying to obtain the UEFA 'A' Licence and UEFA Pro Licence.

Rangers FC appointed him as fitness coach in 2004 and won the Scottish Premier League and Scottish League Cup in the 2004–05 season.

Later, he was assistant manager of Al-Nasr Dubai SC and thereafter, scouted for Middlesbrough. and joined their backroom staff as fitness coach in 2008.

Some years later, he was assistant coach for the China national team, attending the Asian Cup tournament in Qatar, and was 1st team coach at Qingdao.

=== Africa ===
He joined Gor Mahia, champions of the Kenyan Premier League; it would be the first time he would serve as a head coach.

Under his stewardship, he led the K'Ogalo to an unbeaten league title in 2015, an achievement not done in the competition since 1976. Adding to this, the Scot guided them to KPL Top 8 Cup and Kenyan Super Cup titles in 2015 besides winning the league in 2014 and 2015. He also led them to the 2015 CECAFA Cup Final in Tanzania for the first time in 20 years.

As a result of his record-breaking efforts, he was awarded 2015 Kenya SportPesa Coach of the Year.

He became assistant coach to Alex McLeish at Zamalek in 2016, after which Nuttall joined Ghanaian outfit Accra Hearts of Oak in 2017 as head coach and led them to their first appearance in the FA Cup Final in seventeen years and victory in the 60th Anniversary Independence Cup Final against their greatest rivals, Asante Kotoko.

He was hired by Sudanese Premier League outfit El-Hilal El-Obeid in October 2018.

In January 2020, he was appointed head coach of Township Rollers in Botswana and led them to the Mascom Cup Final and 2nd in the Botswana Premier League before the season was postponed due the COVID pandemic.

In March 2021, Nuttall was appointed Manager of Ethiopian club Saint George, on a short contract until the end of the season.

== Achievements and individual honours ==
With over 180 matches as a manager and head coach in 6 countries, Nuttall is unbeaten in 75% of matches with a 55% match win record and an average of more than 2 points per match. Over 500 professional matches as head coach and assistant coach in Scotland, England, Asia and Africa.

Frank Nuttall's achievements include a 47-match unbeaten run, including winning a league title unbeaten.

Gor Mahia

- Kenyan Premier League: 2014, 2015
- Kenyan Super Cup: 2015
- KPL Top 8 Cup: 2015
- SportPesa Kenya Coach of the Year: 2015

Accra Hearts of Oak

- Ghana Independence Cup 2017

England U17

- UEFA U-17 Championship: 2010

Rangers

- Scottish Premier League: 2004–05
- Scottish League Cup: 2004–05

Bristol City

- Football League Trophy: 2003
