= Frazier Ochieng =

Kenyan footballer (born 1975)

Personal information
- Full name: Frazier Okal Ochieng
- Date of birth: 14 October 1975 (age 51)
- Height: 1.75 m (5 ft 9 in)
- Position: Right winger

Senior career*
Years	Team	Apps	(Gls)
1992	Shabana		
1997–1998	Gor Mahia		
2005–2013	FC Münsingen	61	(2)

International career
1998	Kenya	1	(0)
- * Club domestic league appearances and goals

Frazier Okal Ochieng (born 14 October 1975) is a Kenyan former footballer who played as a right winger.

== Career ==
Ochieng played club football for Shabana, Gor Mahia and FC Münsingen.

He earned 1 cap for the Kenyan national team.
