= Osborne Monday =

Kenyan footballer (born 1985)

Personal information
- Date of birth: 24 June 1985 (age 41)
- Place of birth: Nairobi, Kenya
- Height: 1.72 m (5 ft 7 1/2 in)
- Position: Midfielder

Team information
- Current team: Muranga Seal (manager)

Senior career*
Years	Team	Apps	(Gls)
2005–2007	Mathare United		
2007–2008	Al-Shabab		
2008	Tusker		
2008–2009	Azam		
2010–2013	Sofapaka		
2014–2016	Tusker		
2017	Kariobangi Sharks		
2018	Posta Rangers		
2018–2019	Kakamega Homeboyz		

International career
2007–2017	Kenya	27	(1)

Managerial career
- Muranga Seal
- * Club domestic league appearances and goals

Osborne Monday (born 24 June 1985) is a Kenyan football coach and former player who is manager of Muranga Seal.

== Club career ==
Born in Nairobi, Monday played as a midfielder for Mathare United, Al-Shabab, Tusker, Azam, Sofapaka, Kariobangi Sharks, Posta Rangers and Kakamega Homeboyz.

== International career ==
He made his international debut for Kenya in 2007, scoring once in 27 appearances.

== Coaching career ==
As of January 2026 he was manager of Muranga Seal.
