= Kenyan County Leagues =

- Folded: End of 2013 season
- Country: Kenya
- Confederation: CAF
- Promotion to: Provincial Leagues
- Relegation to: District Leagues
- Domestic cup: President's Cup

The Kenyan County Leagues were the fourth tier in the Kenyan football league system. They had a promotion and relegation system with the Kenyan Provincial League and the Kenyan District League, and were divided into several interconnected county divisions that spanned over the counties of Kenya. They were scrapped at the end of the 2013 season in line with the introduction of a new six-tier system by the Football Kenya Federation on 10 July 2013.

== See also ==
- Kenyan football league system
