= Ivan Anguyo =

Kenyan professional footballer

Ivan Anguyo (born 6 April 1986) is a Ugandan footballer who has played for Kenyan Premier League team Gor Mahia FC, A.F.C. Leopards and KRA.

== Career ==
Anguyo was named 'defender of the year' in 2012, at the KPL Awards. At the time, he played for Gor Mahia.

He ended his football career at the Kenyan National Super League team MCF, before becoming a coach.
