= Bernard Wanyama =

Kenyan footballer

Personal information
- Full name: Bernard Mangoli Wanyama
- Date of birth: 24 December 1989 (age 36)
- Place of birth: Nairobi, Kenya
- Height: 1.76 m (5 ft 9 1/2 in)
- Position: Midfielder

Team information
- Current team: Sofapaka

Senior career*
Years	Team	Apps	(Gls)
2010–2013	A.F.C. Leopards		
2013	Sofapaka		
2014–2015	A.F.C. Leopards		
2016	Bandari	11	(1)
2016	A.F.C. Leopards	15	(1)
2017–	Sofapaka	6	(0)

International career^{‡}
2012–	Kenya	6	(0)
- * Club domestic league appearances and goals as of 19:56, 28 May 2018 (UTC) ‡ National team caps and goals as of 19:56, 28 May 2018 (UTC)

Bernard Mangoli Wanyama (born 24 December 1989) is a Kenyan international footballer who plays for A.F.C. Leopards as a midfielder.

== Career ==
Born in Nairobi, Wanyama has played club football for A.F.C. Leopards, Sofapaka and Bandari.

He made his international debut for Kenya in 2012.
