= Ivo Mapunda =

Tanzanian footballer

Personal information
- Full name: Ivo Philip Mapunda
- Date of birth: April 12, 1984 (age 42)
- Place of birth: Dar es Salaam, Tanzania
- Position: Goalkeeper

Youth career
- 2004–2006: Young Africans

Senior career*
Years	Team	Apps	(Gls)
2006–2008	Young Africans FC	30	(0)
2008–2010	Saint-George SA	10	(0)
2009–2010	→ African Lyon (loan)		
2011–2012	Congo United		
2012–2013	Gor Mahia		
2014–	Simba		

International career
2006–	Tanzania	27	(0)
- * Club domestic league appearances and goals

Ivo Philip Mapunda (born 12 April 1984, in Dar es Salaam) is a Tanzanian football goalkeeper who plays for Simba SC.

== Career ==
Mapunda began his career with Young Africans and signed in July 2008 for Saint-George SA. In November 2009, he left the Ethiopian Premier League club Saint-George SA to sign a six-month loan deal with African Lyon.

In 2012, he joined Gor Mahia. this America

== International career ==
He presented on international football the Tanzania national football team.
