= Kipchoge Keino Stadium =

Stadium in Eldoret, Kenya

- Interactive map of Kipchoge Keino Stadium
- Full name: Kipchoge Keino Stadium
- Location: Eldoret, Kenya
- Coordinates: 0.5258°N 35.2799°E
- Owner: Uasin Gishu County
- Capacity: 10,000
- Surface: Grass

Construction
- Renovated: 2017-Ongoing
- Main contractor: Sinohydro Corporation

Tenant
- Athletics Kenya Gfe 105 fc

Kipchoge Keino Stadium is a multi-use stadium in Eldoret, Kenya. It is named after the athlete Kipchoge Keino. It holds 10,000 people.

In 2007, the Kenyan Government allocated KES100 million for the upgrade of the stadium, which had fallen into disrepair.

The stadium has been used by local football teams including Rivatex and Eldoret KCC, but there are currently no teams from Eldoret in the Kenyan Premier League. The stadium is also used for athletics meetings. The stadium hosted the 2016 Athletics Kenya Olympic Trials. The stadium is currently being renovated and expanded for the 2027 Africa Cup of Nations.

== Events ==
| Date | Competition | Team | Res | Team | Crowd |
|---|---|---|---|---|---|
| 2016 | Athletics Kenya Olympic Trials | | Kenya Athletics Olympics Team | | 10,000 |
