= Mulinge Ndeto =

Kenyan footballer (born 1981)

Personal information
- Full name: James Mulinge Munandi Ndeto
- Date of birth: 25 January 1981 (age 45)
- Place of birth: Kenya
- Position: Defender

Team information
- Current team: Ulinzi Stars

Senior career*
Years	Team	Apps	(Gls)
2003–2004	K.C.B.		
2004–2007	Tusker		
2008–	Ulinzi Stars		

International career
2003–2013	Kenya	44	(1)
- * Club domestic league appearances and goals as of 10 May 2014

James Mulinge Munandi Ndeto (born 25 January 1981), commonly known as Mulinge Ndeto, is a Kenyan footballer who plays for Kenyan Premier League side Ulinzi Stars as a defender. He previously played for K.C.B. and Tusker. He also appeared for the Kenya national team, and was part of the squad that won the 2013 CECAFA Cup.
