= Utalii F.C. =

Kenyan football club

Utalii Football Club was a football club from Ruaraka, supported by the Utalii College, a hospitality and tourism training institution. Utalii won the Kenya Premier League title in 1997. However, due to mismanagement at its parent college, it became impossible to find resources to keep the club running and it was dissolved in 2005.

== Honours ==
- FKF President's Cup: 2003
