= George Tyson (film director) =

Kenyan-born filmmaker

- Born: George Okumu Otieno; 1973
- Died: 30 May 2014 (aged 40–41); Kibaigwa
- Citizenship: Kenyan
- Occupation: Filmmaker
- Notable work: Dilemma, 2003

George Tyson, born George Okumu Otieno (1973–2014) was a Kenyan filmmaker who worked mainly in Tanzania. A 'bongo movie' director, he was "regarded as one of the best commercial directors in the country" and as the "godfather of Bongowood".

== Death ==
He died in a car crash at Kibaigwa on 30 May 2014.

== Filmography ==
- Dilemma, 2003
- Girlfriend - Filamu ya maisha na muziki, 2004
- Sabrina, 2004
