= Joseph Mbugi =

Kenyan footballer (born 1986)

Personal information
- Date of birth: 2 February 1986 (age 40)
- Position: Midfielder

Team information
- Current team: Posta Rangers

Senior career*
Years	Team	Apps	(Gls)
2010	Mahakama		
2011	Posta Rangers		
2012	Tusker		
2013–	Posta Rangers		

International career^{‡}
2012–	Kenya	2	(0)
- * Club domestic league appearances and goals as of 12:25, 1 May 2017 (UTC) ‡ National team caps and goals as of 12:25, 1 May 2017 (UTC)

Joseph Mbugi (born 2 February 1986) is a Kenyan international footballer who plays for Posta Rangers, as a midfielder.

== Career ==
Mbugi has played club football for Mahakama, Posta Rangers and Tusker.

He made his international debut for Kenya in 2012.
