= Frank Nuttall (priest) =

Archdeacon of Madras (1922–1924)

Frank Nuttall (24 September 1870 – 7 August 1943) was Archdeacon of Madras from 1922 to 1924.

Nuttall was born in Ilkeston. He was educated at Oakham School and Sidney Sussex College, Cambridge. He was ordained in 1896. He served curacies at Hunslet and New Brighton. He was a chaplain in Madras from 1900 until 1924. Returning to England, he was Vicar of Chevithorne from 1924 until his retirement in 1929.
