= Rivatex F.C. =

Kenyan football club

Rivatex
- Full name: Rivatex Football Club
- Ground: Kipchoge Keino Stadium

Rivatex was an association football club based in Eldoret, Kenya.

In 1990 the team won the Kenyan Cup. Its last documented match was in 1995.

== Stadium ==
The team played at the 10,000 capacity Kipchoge Keino Stadium.

== Performance in Caf competitions ==
- 1991 African Cup Winners' Cup: First round

== Honours ==
- Kenyan Cup: 1990, 1995

== Notable players ==
- Sammy Sholei
