= Ali Abondo =

Kenyan footballer (born 1989)

Personal information
- Full name: Victor Ali Hassan Abondo
- Date of birth: 20 November 1989 (age 36)
- Place of birth: Kisumu, Kenya
- Position: Midfielder

Team information
- Current team: Wazito

Senior career*
Years	Team	Apps	(Gls)
2006–2007	Sony Sugar		
2009	Bandari		
2010–2011	Tusker		
2012–2013	Gor Mahia		
2013–2014	Tusker		
2015–2016	Gor Mahia		
2016	Ajax Cape Town	3	(0)
2017–2019	Bloemfontein Celtic	0	(0)
2019–	Wazito		

International career^{‡}
2007–	Kenya	6	(0)
- * Club domestic league appearances and goals ‡ National team caps and goals as of 20 November 2017

Victor Ali Hassan Abondo (born 20 November 1989 in Kisumu) is a Kenyan footballer who retired in 2020 and Current CEO and Founder of Ali Abondo Soccer Academy.

== Career ==
On 30 August 2019, Abondo joined Wazito FC. retired after 1 year to concentrate on his football Academy
