= Kevin Omondi =

Kenyan footballer

Personal information
- Full name: Kevin Ondier Omondi
- Date of birth: 4 August 1990 (age 36)
- Place of birth: Kenya
- Position: Midfielder

Senior career*
Years	Team	Apps	(Gls)
–2011	FISA Academy		
2009–2011	→ Gor Mahia (loan)		
2012–2014	Gor Mahia		

International career^{‡}
2010–	Kenya	19	(1)
- * Club domestic league appearances and goals as of 30 June 2014 ‡ National team caps and goals as of 8 May 2014

Kevin Ondier Omondi (born 4 August 1990) is a Kenyan footballer who plays as a midfielder for Gor Mahia in the Kenyan Premier League.

== International career ==
=== International goals ===
Scores and results list Kenya's goal tally first.

No	Date	Venue	Opponent	Score	Result	Competition
1.	14 January 2011	Petro Sport Stadium, Cairo, Egypt	Egypt	1–3	1–5	2011 Nile Basin Tournament
