= Moses Odhiambo =

Kenyan footballer (born 1986)

Personal information
- Date of birth: 13 April 1986 (age 40)
- Place of birth: Nairobi, Kenya
- Height: 1.94 m (6 ft 4 1/2 in)
- Position: Striker

Team information
- Current team: Sofapaka

Senior career*
Years	Team	Apps	(Gls)
2004–2006	Tusker		
2006	Moro United		
2007	Simba		
2007–2009	APR		
2009–2010	Young Africans		
2010–2011	APR		
2011–2013	Gor Mahia		
2014	Thika United		
2015	Ushuru		
2016–	Sofapaka		

International career^{‡}
2004–2006	Kenya	2	(0)
- * Club domestic league appearances and goals as of 07:41, 1 May 2017 (UTC) ‡ National team caps and goals as of 07:41, 1 May 2017 (UTC)

Moses Odhiambo (born 13 April 1986) is a Kenyan international footballer who plays for Sofapaka, as a striker.

== Career ==
Born in Nairobi, Odhiambo has played club football for Tusker, Moro United, Simba, APR, Young Africans, Gor Mahia, Thika United, Ushuru and Sofapaka.

He made his international debut for Kenya in 2004, earning two caps.
