= Kenyan Super Cup =

Football competition

- Founded: 2009; 17 years ago
- Region: Kenya
- Teams: 2
- Current champions: Tusker (4rd title)
- Most championships: Gor Mahia (7 titles)

The Kenyan Super Cup is a Kenyan football championship contested by the winners of the Kenyan Premier League and the FKF President's Cup. Having been formed in 2009, it is the Kenyan equivalent to the FA Community Shield of England, which is competed for by the winners of the Premier League and the FA Cup.

The first winners of the cup were Gor Mahia, who beat Mathare United 3–0 to lift the trophy in 2009.

== Winners ==
=== By year ===
Year	League	Score	Cup
2009	Mathare United	0–3	Gor Mahia
2010	Sofapaka	1–0	A.F.C. Leopards
2011	Ulinzi Stars	0–1	Sofapaka
2012	Tusker	1–1^{*}^{[A]}	Gor Mahia
2013	Tusker	0–0^{*}^{[B]}	Gor Mahia
2013	Gor Mahia	1–1^{*}^{[C]}	Tusker^{*}^{[1]}
2014	Not Played Due To Lack of Sponsors		
2015	Gor Mahia	2–1	Sofapaka
2016	Gor Mahia	0–1	Bandari
2017	Gor Mahia	1–0	Tusker
2018	Gor Mahia	1–0	A.F.C. Leopards
2019	Kariobangi Sharks	1–0	Gor Mahia F.C.
2020	Gor Mahia	1–0	Bandari
2021	Tusker	1–1^{*}^{[D]}	Gor Mahia
2022	Not Played		
2023	Gor Mahia	1–1^{*}^{[E]}	Kakamega Homeboyz
2024	Not Played		
2025	Not Played		
2026	Gor Mahia	1–3	Tusker

=== By number of wins (clubs) ===
Team	Wins	Years
Gor Mahia	7	2009, 2015, 2017, 2018, 2020, 2021, 2023
Tusker	4	2012, 2013, 2021, 2026
Sofapaka	2	2010, 2011
Bandari	1	2016
Kariobangi Sharks	1	2019

=== Notes ===
- 1 – Tusker will play Gor Mahia as the 2013 KPL Top 8 Cup champions.

- A – Score was 1–1 after 90 minutes. Tusker won the shoot-out 4–1.
- B – Score was 0–0 after 90 minutes. Gor Mahia won the shoot-out 5–4.
- C – Score was 1–1 after 90 minutes. Tusker won the shoot-out 5–3.
- D – Score was 1–1 after 90 minutes. Tusker won the shoot-out 8–7.
- E – Score was 1–1 after 90 minutes. Gor Mahia won the shoot-out 4-2.
