= Gor Mahia F.C. =

Kenyan football team

Coordinates: 1°17′38″S 36°50′32″E

Gor Mahia
- Full name: Gor Mahia Football Club
- Nicknames: The Green Army; The Green Commandoes
- Short name: GMFC; GOR
- Founded: 17 February 1968; 58 years ago
- Ground: Moi International Sports Centre; Nyayo National Stadium (selected matches)
- Capacity: 48,063; 18,000
- Chairman: Ambrose Rachier
- Head coach: Charles Akonnor (Head Coach)
- League: Kenyan Premier League
- 2025–26: Champions
- Website: Official website
Home colours	Away colours

Gor Mahia Football Club (/ˌɡɔːr ˈmaɪjə/), commonly known as K'Ogalo (Dholuo for 'descendant of Ogalo'), is a professional football club based in Nairobi, Kenya. They have won the Kenyan Premier League a record 22 times, and have also won the FKF President's Cup a record 9 times. It is the first and only team from Kenya to win an African continental title to date, having won the African Cup Winners' Cup in 1987 after previously reaching the final in 1979. "And they did that undefeated."

Several teams in the Kenyan football league system are closely linked to ethnic groups in Kenya; Gor Mahia are considered to represent the Luo people in the south of Nyanza Province.

== History ==
The club was formally established on 17 February 1968 as a merger of Luo Union and Luo Sports Club (also known as Luo Stars) and won the national league at the first time of asking. Some of its original leaders were politicians Tom Mboya and Jaramogi Oginga Odinga. However, the club was founded much earlier, in 1915, and participated intermittently in local tournaments in Western Kenya. Various groups used this name at different times.

The club plays its home games at the Nairobi City Stadium. Alternatively, they also play at the Moi International Sports Centre and the Nyayo National Stadium. The club has also previously hosted matches at the Kisumu County Stadium and the Mombasa Municipal Stadium.

The club went on to win the Kenya National Football League in their debut season. In 1976, Gor Mahia won the national league unbeaten, and repeated the same feat 39 years later under the leadership of Frank Nuttall.

Towards the end of the 2000s, Gor Mahia began a steady resurgence, attracting fans back to the pitch and regularly filling stadiums.

The club returned to silverware in 2008, winning the KFF Cup after a thirteen-year wait for a major trophy. Gor Mahia proceeded to win the Kenya DSTV Super Cup against the year's defending champs, Mathare United before the beginning of the 2009 KPL season.

On 26 October 2011, Gor Mahia defeated Sofapaka to win the 2011 edition of the FKL Cup having dispatched their archrivals AFC Leopards 6 days earlier in a 20 October Heroes Day thriller.

After merging of Luo Union and Luo Sports Club, Gor Mahia was named after a legendary Medicine man from Kanyamwa, Ndhiwa, Homa Bay in Luo mythology. His nickname was Gor Mahia ("mahia" is Luo for "magic") because he was famous for performing magic. The club's most famous nickname, K'Ogalo, also stems from the medicine man, whose full name was Gor Wuod Ogada nyakwar Ogalo (Gor son of Ogada grandson of Ogalo), and as such was known as Gor Makogalo, or Gor K'Ogalo in short, which means "Gor of Ogalo's homestead".

Several prominent Luos from all walks of life met in Nairobi to christen the club. The name Gor Mahia was settled upon from a shortlist of other Luo cultural heroes and warriors such as: Nyathi Kwach; Lwanda Magere from Kano; Okore wuod Ogonda Mumbo from Kisumu; Ogutu wuod Kipapi from Ugenya; Kech Kamajwala from Asembo and Tao K'Ogot also from Ugenya.

=== 1970s ===
Gor Mahia won the league title in their inaugural season in 1968 with legendary Kenyan striker William Ouma "Chege" scoring 19 goals. They would win the league title for the second time in 1974. In 1976, Gor Mahia became the first Kenyan football club to win the National League unbeaten, thanks to the exploits of playmaker Allan Thigo who also acted as a coach. He was ably assisted by stars such as Festus Nyakota, James Ogolla and new recruits Jerry Imbo who had been recruited from Black Mamba and legendary goal poacher Maurice Ochieng who had been recruited from Kenya Police. Goalkeeper George Ayuka was in sensational form throughout the season. Maurice Ochieng finished as leading scorer in the league with 18 goals, ahead of the legendary William "Chege" Ouma who scored 16. The 1976 squad was one of the strongest the club had ever fielded. It included such stars as Masanta Osoro, Paul "Cobra" Oduwa, Festus Nyakota, Duncan Aluko and Duncan Migan, all of whom played for the national team at one point. The former Minister for Roads and Transport Chris Obure also played for Gor in their inaugural season in 1968 and 1969.

In the 1979 African Cup Winners' Cup final, Gor Mahia faced Canon Yaounde of Cameroun, the defending champions. Gor Mahia lost the first leg 0–2 and were then beaten 0–6 in the second leg, with unconfirmed reports suggesting some players had accepted bribes.

=== 1980s ===
Gor Mahia beat AFC Leopards 1–0 to win the 1983 league and at the end of the match, President Moi presented the league to captain Peter Otieno Bassanga.

Gor Mahia won the inaugural Moi Golden Cup by beating Bandari 1–0 in the final. An injury time goal by Hezborn Omollo secured the victory at Nyayo stadium. The tough Bandari outfit coached by Mohammed Kheri was at the time playing in the Coast Provincial League. Winning the Moi Golden Cup enabled Gor Mahia to participate in the 1987 Africa Cup Winners Cup.

In 1989 K'Ogalo retained the Moi Golden Cup for the 3rd successive year by beating Kenya Breweries 2–0 in the final. After the match, Abass Magongo who was man of the match was carried shoulder high by fans. Gor Mahia however lost the league title to a resurgent AFC Leopards who benefited from their recruiting spree and sponsorship from Crown Paints Kenya. Having won the Moi Golden Cup the previous year, Gor Mahia were back in the Cup winners Cup in 1989. In the 1st round they received a walkover when Villa of Uganda pulled out. In round 2 they beat Costa Do Sol of Mozambique 2–1 at home and tied them 0–0 away. In the quarter finals they faced LPRC Oilers of Liberia. The 1st leg was played at Nyayo stadium. Gor Mahia played a disjointed game and the match ended 0–0. After the match, the Liberian players celebrated as if they had won a trophy. Gor Mahia team manager told the media that K'Ogalo would conquer the return leg. Indeed, they did, winning 3–1 in Monrovia. Coach Mohammed Kheri had been drafted from Bandari on a temporary basis to replace Johnson. In the semis they faced El Merreikh of Sudan. After winning the 1st leg 1–0, they lost 0–2 in the return leg in Omdurman. So Gor Mahia bowed out in the semi-final.

=== 1990s ===
1996 proved to be a difficult year for the club. The club was eliminated in the 1st round of the Africa champions league by Zimbabwean outfit, Dynamos, leading to one of the worst riots ever seen in Nairobi. In the League they finished 8th which was unprecedented in the club's history. In 1997, the club recovered and almost won the National League, only losing by goal difference to eventual winners, Utalii. Among the players who were instrumental in that campaign were Victor Onyango in goal; Josiah Ougo and Tillen Oguta in defence; Frazier Ochieng and Dan Ogada in midfield and Bonaventure Maruti, Steve Okumu and Steve Odiaga in attack. The club was unable to hold on to these superb players, many of whom left for various destinations including the Middle East. The last two years of the 20th century were characterized by inconsistent performances by the club mainly due to lack of finances. Financial difficulties prevented the club from hiring a qualified coach and retaining quality players, many of whom departed for better-paid opportunities elsewhere.

=== 2000s ===
At one point, the club refused to pay a KPL imposed fine. However, KPL managing director received full payment of the Gor Mahia penalty from an anonymous "senior official of another KPL club" who wrote in an unsigned letter that "it is deeply disappointing that a few colleagues who are senior Gor Mahia officials refuse to respect the KPL policy against assaults on referees which their representative approved in February. Their refusal to respect the rules also saddens me because it is not those officials but their own players who are suffering the most after playing so well this year. Out of respect and sympathy for the Gor Mahia players, I enclose full payment of Ksh 45,063 so they can resume playing."

=== 2010s ===
Gor Mahia FC drew an average home attendance of 2,488 in the 2011 edition of the top-flight football league of Kenya. It was the highest average home attendance in the league. Financially, 2011 was a landmark year in which Gor Mahia secured their first officially recognised shirt sponsorship. The club had previously worn shirts bearing the International Casino name in 1991, though the details of that arrangement remain unclear. The KSh.38 million/= Tuzo sponsorship by Spin Knit Dairy was the most lucrative by any club in Kenya when announced. Gor Mahia went on to win the FKL Cup and finish fourth in the league.

At the beginning of the season, the club acquired Moses Odhiambo, a former international who had played in Tanzanian and Rwandese leagues and he proved to be a revelation. Teenage striker Edwin Lavatsa was also a big hit in his first season in the KPL. After strong performances in mid-season, the club's form faded and Gor finished fourth in the league, largely due to disharmony within the coaching staff and the overcommitment of head coach Zedekiah Otieno to the Kenya national team. In Otieno's absence, Cameroonian assistant coach Anaba Awono led the club to win the FKL Cup after beating bitter rivals A.F.C. Leopards in the semis, and then edging out Sofapaka in the final. The club also conducted its elections towards the end of November and brought in many youthful officials.

Gor Mahia started the 2012 season in high tempo after attending the traditional Nyanza tour to meet fans and recruit more players from the fanatical homeland. The tour itself was a gruelling six-day affair in which the team played nine matches, winning seven and drawing two.

The club went on a signing spree in preparation for the 2012 CAF Confederation Cup, bringing in more than ten players. Baldwin Ngwa and Ibrahim Kitawi rejoined the squad. The squad was widely regarded as one of the club's strongest in years. However, this was not to be, as the club, despite a winning start against Thika United in the league on 12 February 2012, went on to lose 3–0 away to debutants Muhoroni Youth and 1–0 at home to Ferroviário de Maputo of Mozambique in the first hurdle of the Confederation Cup. These matches coupled with the Super Cup loss to Tusker and another league loss to Karuturi Sports led to the disbandment of the entire technical team led by Awono. Others shown the door included assistant coach Ken Odhiambo, team manager Jolawi Obondo, coach Julius Owino and fitness coach Zablon Otieno.

The 2013 season saw Gor Mahia clinch their first league title in 18 years, under the leadership of goalkeeper Jerim Onyango and coach Bobby Williamson. On the way to a record 13th title, fans of the club popularised the phrase "Giniwasekao" around the country, which is Luo for "we have taken this thing".

Gor Mahia players further added to the club's mystique by finishing their Sportspesa Premier League fixtures for 2015 season unbeaten, under Head Coach Frank Nuttall

== Club identity ==
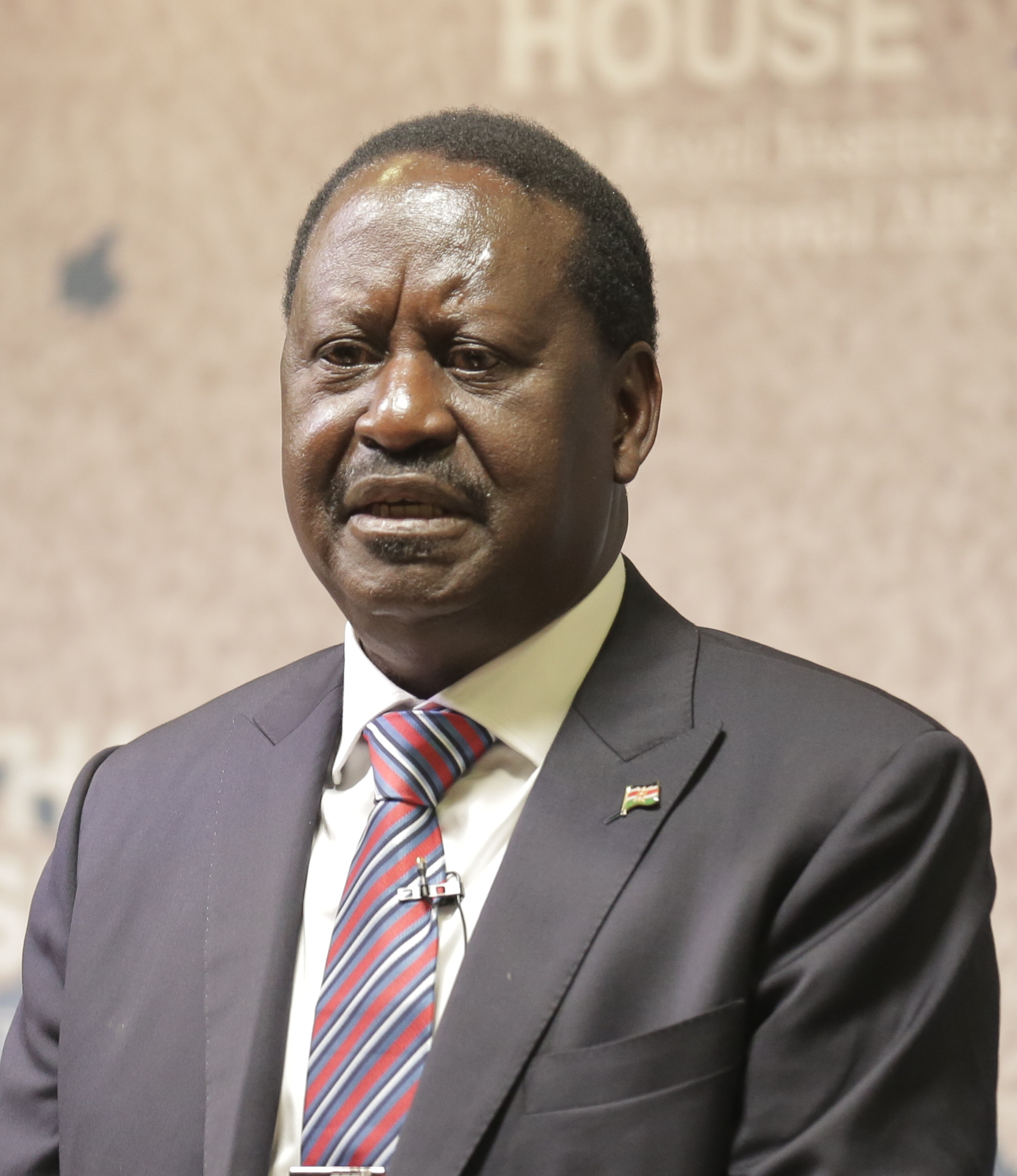
Gor Mahia has a longstanding official link to politician Raila Odinga.

Gor Mahia's supporter base is rooted in the Luo ethnic group, where the club is affectionately known as "Sirkal" (government). Gor Mahia traces its origin back to the 1920s, when the Luo Union was founded as a welfare association to unite the Luo ethnic group in Kenya and later across East Africa. The association initially focused on social support but later formed football clubs, including Luo Union FC, which played a key role in the development of Luo football. Following political divisions in the 1960s linked to prominent figures like Jaramogi Oginga Odinga and Tom Mboya, Luo Union FC split and eventually merged with Luo Sports Club in 1968 to form Gor Mahia FC, named after a legendary Luo warrior. In the 1970s, Gor Mahia survived an order by Kenyan President Daniel arap Moi to drop club names directly linked to ethnic identities by retaining its name, while the Luo Union welfare organisation was disbanded and its football club reverted to the name Reunion F.C. This period saw Gor Mahia become firmly established as the leading club for the South Nyanza Luo community, even as political pressures sought to reduce ethnic affiliations in sports.

Matchdays can be highly charged, with supporters using the terraces to air frustrations related to ethnic and political identity.

The club has long-standing political connections, most notably with prominent Luo politician and Orange Democratic Movement (ODM) leader Raila Odinga, who is both an ardent supporter and a key patron. During election seasons, Odinga's donations to the team, such as his Sh1.2 million contribution for transport, have been used to bolster grassroots mobilisation. Rival politicians have similarly engaged with football fandom. For example, Deputy President Kalonzo Musyoka gave KSh 2 million to support Harambee Stars logistics, illustrating how political figures use club and national football patronage to cultivate youth support.

Derby matches against AFC Leopards frequently mirror internal party rivalries, particularly within the ODM. In the 2012 Gor Mahia vs AFC Leopards match, fans chanted political slogans such as "Mudavadi! Mudavadi!" and "Raila must go!", highlighting how football can serve as a proxy for political competition. At the time, Raila Odinga was facing a presidential nomination challenge from Musalia Mudavadi, a senior politician from the Luhya ethnic group. Gor Mahia is traditionally supported by Luo fans, while AFC Leopards are associated with the Luhya ethnic group.

In April 2025, Eliud Owalo, a member of the Luo political establishment, was appointed Deputy Patron of Gor Mahia alongside Raila Odinga. A long-time supporter of the club, Owalo framed his role as part of a broader plan to modernise its operations. Since late 2023, he has contributed a 42-seater bus worth KSh 20 million and pledged support for new infrastructure, including a stadium, clubhouse, training grounds, and player housing. Owalo has also proposed a permanent secretariat to strengthen the club's administration, citing the need for professionalism in line with other African clubs. His increased involvement has been viewed as reinforcing Gor Mahia's longstanding ties to Luo political figures. While some interpret this as political patronage, others argue that such structured engagement may bring much-needed stability and institutional reform to the club.

== Top scorers ==
Data compiled by K'Ogalo Pundit indicates that the club's top all-time goal scorer is Sammy Onyango 'Jogoo' who scored 92 goals in all competitive matches for the club; he is also the club's leading all-time scorer in the league competition with 79 goals. Sammy Onyango joined Gor Mahia from Hakati Sportiff in 1981 and played for the club till 1989. He is followed by Allan Thigo with 88 goals and Hesbon Omollo with 84 goals.

== Managerial history ==
=== Jack Johnson ===
Jack Johnson was appointed Gor Mahia manager in 1987.

==== John Bobby Ogolla ====
A caretaker coach, former captain and all-time legend Bobby Ogolla, took the position of head coach, assisted by Technical manager Tom Ogweno (a former Kenya national striker and Ulinzi Stars player) and was immediately thrust into tough fixtures against Tusker and A.F.C. Leopards. The team lost 2–0 to the former and drew 0–0 against the Leopards in a match marred by crowd trouble.

In the next matches, Gor drew 1–1 with Rangers and 0–0 with Sony as Ogolla tried to steady the ship from sinking.

==== Zdravko Logarušić ====
In April 2012, Croatian tactician Zdravko Logarušić was drafted as head coach. Bobby Ogolla accepted a role as deputy. The first match for the pair ended in 1–1 with Mathare United, followed by a 0–1 loss to Oserian F.C., a win against Sofapaka and a loss against Ulinzi in late April. This was the last loss for the club this year in any match. From there the club has won seven of their next eight KPL matches against Nairobi City Stars, Chemelil FC, KCB FC, Western stima – by doing the double in both legs except for a first-leg draw against Stima. By 12 August, the club had risen to sixth in the table after having been in relegation places during the first two months of the 2012 season. The club also qualified for the KPL Top 8 final against Ulinzi after defeating Tusker in both legs of the semi-final, having received a walkover in the quarter-finals against AFC Leopards, who failed to appear on matchday, citing various excuses.

Gor Mahia also qualified for the next round of the FKF Cup (the domestic title) after dispatching Borabu Chiefs 5–2 and are in contention for a treble. This success is attributed to the good cohesion within the coaching staff, a tough fitness regime introduced by a Finnish expert, acquisition of a professional goalkeeper coach but mostly to the excellent field combination of the team's players. The technical bench has revamped and reorganised the playing unit to create a potent force within just a few months.

After failing to return on time from holiday, Logarušić was sacked with immediate effect on 25 June 2013, and replaced by former Uganda national team manager Bobby Williamson 9 days later, on 5 July 2013.

==== Bobby Williamson ====
Bobby Williamson's managerial debut came in a league match against Sugar FC on 17 July 2013. He left the club in September 2014, being replaced by Frank Nuttall, whom he recommended to the club.

==== Steven Polack ====
Joined the club in August 2019. Led Mahia to One Premier League and One Charity Shield. Also won coach of the month 3 times,2019/2020. Left the club in October 2020.

==== Johnny McKinstry ====
Johnny McKinstry led Mahia to success, twice in the Premier League as well as one Charity Shield, from 2022 to 2024, before being appointed to manage Gambia national football team.

== Logo ==
Former logo

Present logo

== Gor Mahia Fans Foundation ==
The Gor Mahia Fans Foundation was launched in early 2012 to develop and maintain an effective and influential role for Gor Mahia fans in the running of the football club, and to strengthen the bonds between the club and its community of followers through participation in activities that promote better management and running of the club and those that influence better performance and motivates the playing unit, with all these being made possible by inviting involvement of the fans to take part in the activities to make K'Ogalo better. Its range of plans includes:

- Assisting the club to own its own stadium, training facilities and club house through a fans' trust.
- Assisting the club to establish its own youth system for both genders.
- Establish a Player Reward scheme.
- Partnering with the club to set up proper merchandise enterprises for mutual benefit.

The foundation is currently involved in jointly running, marketing, and sourcing for funds for the Gor Mahia under-19 and academy teams, CSR activities for the Gor Mahia family, most notably regular charity events at Children's Oncology Ward for cancer patients at the Kenyatta National Hospital, and jointly organising, marketing and sourcing for funds for the Jerry Onyango Tournament in Ugunja every December to unearth new talents in rural areas.

== Honours ==
- African Cup Winners' Cup: 1

1987

- CECAFA Clubs Cup: 3

1980, 1981, 1985

- Kenyan Premier League: 22

1968, 1974, 1976, 1979, 1983, 1984, 1985, 1987, 1990, 1991, 1993, 1995, 2013, 2014, 2015, 2017, 2018, 2018–19, 2019–20, 2022–23, 2023–24, 2025–26

- Kenya Challenge Cup/Moi Golden Cup/Transparency Cup/President's Cup/KFF Cup/FKL Cup/FKF Cup: 11

1976, 1981, 1983, 1986, 1987, 1988, 1992, 2008, 2011, 2012, 2021

- Kenyan Super Cup: 6

2009, 2013 (pre-season), 2015, 2017, 2018, 2020

- KPL Top 8 Cup: 2

2012, 2015

=== As Luo Union ===
- Kenyan Premier League: 2

1964, 1975

- FA Cup of Kenya:

1964, 1965, 1966

== Performance in CAF competitions ==
- CAF Confederation Cup: 5 appearances

2009 – Preliminary Round
2012 – Preliminary Round
2013 – First Round
2018 – Group Stage
2018-19 – Quarter Finals

- CAF Champions League / African Cup of Champions Clubs: 13 appearances

The club have 8 appearances in African Cup of Champions Clubs from 1969 to 1996 and 5 appearances in CAF Champions League from 2014 till now.

1969: Quarter-Finals
1977: Second Round
1980: Second Round
1984: abandoned in Second Round
1991: First Round
1992: Quarter-Finals
1994: First Round
1996: First Round
2014: First Round
2015: First Round
2016: Preliminary Round
2018: First Round
2018-19: First Round
2019-20: First Round

- CAF Cup: 2 appearances

1993 – Quarter-Finals
1998 – First Round

- CAF Cup Winners' Cup: 7 appearances

1979 – Finalist
1981 – Quarter-Finals
1982 – withdrew in First Round

1983 – Preliminary Round
1987 – Champion
1988 – Quarter-Finals

1989 – Semi-Finals

== See also ==
- Gor Mahia F.C.–A.F.C. Leopards rivalry
