= Moi International Sports Centre =

Stadium in Kasarani, Kenya

Moi International Sports Centre Kasarani
- The Home of Heroes
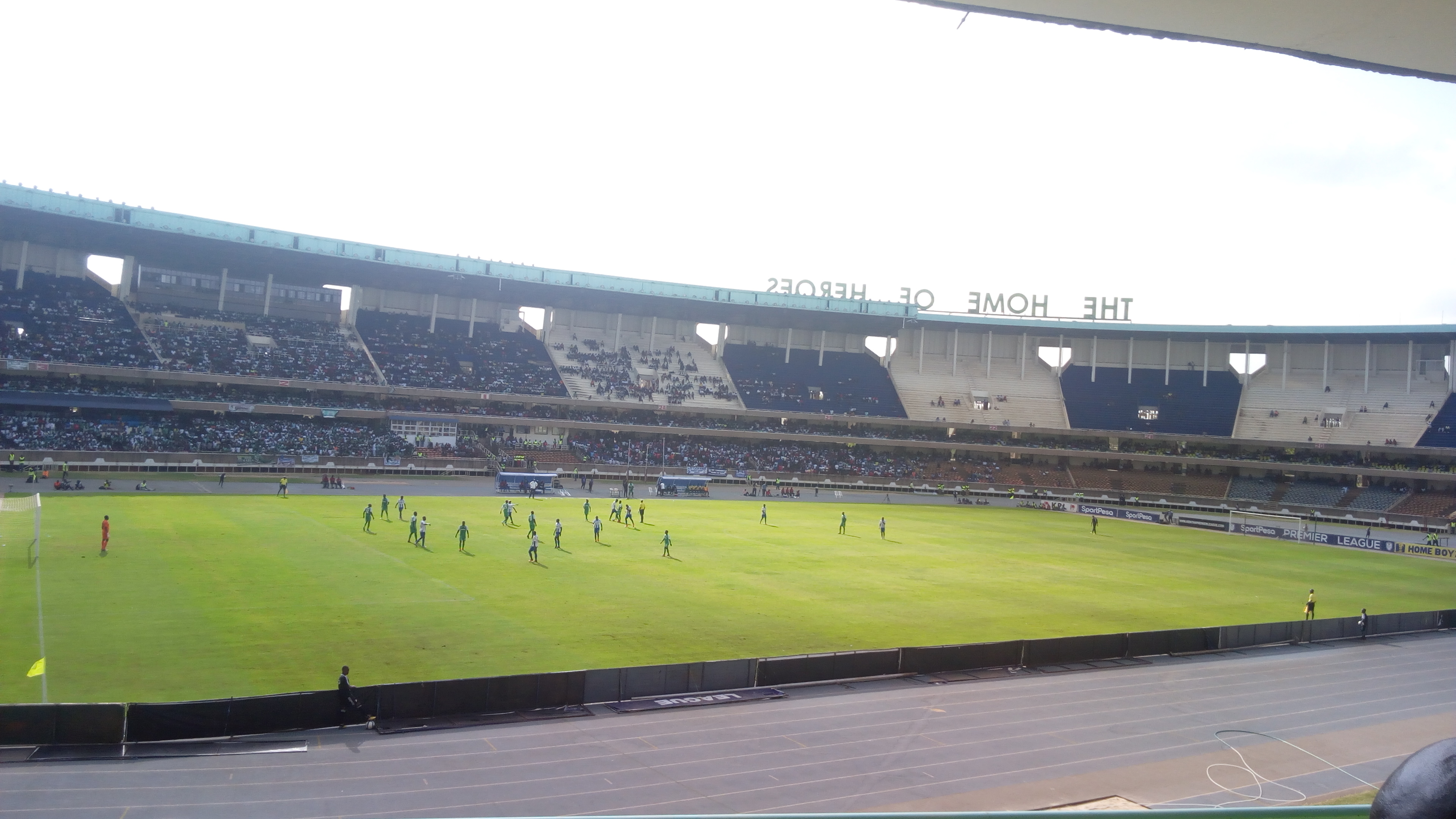
- CAF
- Interactive map of Moi International Sports Centre Kasarani
- Full name: Moi International Sports Centre
- Location: Kasarani, Nairobi, Kenya
- Coordinates: 1°13′41″S 36°53′26″E
- Owner: Government of Kenya
- Operator: Sports Kenya
- Capacity: 48,063 (2024–present); Capacity history; 65,000 (2012–2024); 5,000 (Kasarani Indoor Arena); 5,000 (Competition pool)
- Surface: GrassMaster

Construction
- Groundbreaking: 1986
- Built: 1987
- Opened: August 1987
- Renovated: 2010–12, 2024

Tenants
- Kenya national football team Kenyan Premier League; Athletics Kenya

The Moi International Sports Centre (abbreviated as MISC, locally referred to as the Kasarani Stadium) is a multi-purpose stadium in Kasarani, Kenya. It was built in 1987 for the All-Africa Games held in Nairobi. The facilities include a 48,063-seat stadium with a running track and a pitch used for football and rugby union, a competition size swimming pool, an indoor arena and a 108-bed capacity hotel. The stadium is located at 1,612 metres (1.002 mi) above sea level in altitude.

== History ==
During a visit to China in 1980, Kenyan President Daniel arap Moi requested that China fund a national sports center for Kenya. After signing a series of protocols and agreements, China began work on the Moi International Sports Center in 1982. In 1987, China completed the first phase and turned the center over to Kenya in time for the All-Africa Games later that year.The sports complex later appeared on the 20 Kenyan shilling note.

The stadium was closed in January 2010 for renovation works worth KSh.900 million, funded by a grant to the Government of Kenya by the Government of China. Chinese firm, Sheng Li Engineering Construction Company Limited, was contracted to conduct the renovations. The renovation works started in August 2010 and took 12 months. The stadium was reopened in March 2012 after completion of the renovations.

In April and May 2014, after terror attacks in Nairobi and Mombasa, the main stadium was used as a screening center as part of 'Operation Usalama Watch' during which thousands of people were rounded up and arrested by the Kenya Police.

The stadium hosted the 2017 World U18 Championships in Athletics and 2021 World Athletics U20 Championships.

The stadium was closed for renovations in 2024, due to it selection to host the CHAN 2024 early in 2025, as well as the 2027 Africa Cup of Nations. The refurbishments saw the capacity reduced from 65 to 55 thousand, a new larger roof installed, flood lighting upgraded to 3,000 Lux, Video Assistant Referee cameras installed as well as various upgrades to the workstations inside the stadium. The venue will host the 2029 World Athletics Championships.

== Facilities ==
=== Kasarani Stadium (Moi International Sports Centre) ===
The main arena is used by the Kenya national football team for most of its home games, as well as Kenyan Premier League sides.

Since 2013, the Safari Sevens rugby union tournament has been hosted at the Kasarani Stadium. For sponsorship reasons, the stadium was known as Safaricom Stadium Kasarani.

=== Kasarani Indoor Arena ===
The indoor arena seats 5,000 and hosts volleyball, gymnastics, basketball, badminton, boxing, wrestling, martial arts and table tennis. For sponsorship reasons, the arena is also known as Safaricom Indoor Arena.

=== Kasarani Aquatic Complex ===
This arena consists of an Olympic competition pool 1.25 metres in depth, a recreational public diving and a children's pool.

== International matches ==
Date	Competition	Result	Rival	Attendance
11 September 2018	International Friendly	1–0	Malawi	3,500
14 October 2018	2019 AFCON Qualifiers	3–0	Ethiopia	60,000
18 Nov 2019	2021 AFCON Qualifiers	1–1	Togo	

Preceded by Stade du 5 Juillet 1962; Pune	Rollball World Cup venue 2011	Succeeded by Shree Shiv Chhatrapati Sports Complex; Pune
Preceded by Stade du 5 Juillet 1962; Algiers	All-Africa Games Main stadium 1987	Succeeded by Cairo International Stadium; Cairo
Preceded by Estadio Olímpico Pascual Guerrero; Cali	IAAF World U18 Championships stadium 2017	Succeeded by None; Games abolished
