= A.F.C. Leopards =

Association football club in Kenya

AFC Leopards
- Full name: Abaluhya Football Club Leopards Sports Club
- Nickname: Ingwe (The Leopards)
- Short name: AFC
- Founded: 12 March 1964; 62 years ago
- Ground: Nyayo National Stadium; Nairobi
- Capacity: 18,000
- Chairman: Fred Ambani
- Head coach: Fred Ambani
- League: Kenyan Premier League
- 2025–26: KPL, 2nd of 18
- Website: www.afcleopards.co.ke
Home colours	Away colours

Abaluhya Football Club Leopards Sports Club, officially abbreviated as AFC Leopards, is a Kenyan professional football club based in Nairobi. It currently competes in the Kenyan Premier League, the top tier of the Kenyan football league system, and was founded in 1964 by football lovers from the Luhya community. With 12 top-flight league titles to their name, AFC Leopards is Kenya's third most successful club behind Tusker FC (13 titles) and Gor Mahia (21 titles), the latter with whom they regularly contest the Mashemeji Derby. The team currently plays most of its home games at the Nyayo National Stadium.

AFC Leopards' standing as one of the most successful clubs in the region is underlined by the fact that it has won the Kenyan Premier League 12 times. AFC Leopards has also won the Kenya Cup 10 times, and the CECAFA Club Championship 5 times.

The club was formed in 1964 as Abaluhya United Football Club. In 1973 the club changed its name to Abaluhya Football Club when a number of small clubs amalgamated. In 1980 the club was renamed AFC Leopards, the name it holds until present.

In 2008 they played in the Nationwide League and won the title in their zone. They returned to the Kenyan Premier League for the 2009 season in which it also won the KFF Cup.

Several teams in the Kenyan football league system are intimately linked to ethnic groups in Kenya; AFC Leopards are considered to represent the Luhya people of Western Kenya.

== History ==
=== The 1960s ===
From the 1960s or even earlier; the notion and formation of various Abaluhya teams for invitational matches became the forerunner of what eventually would become Abaluhya United. On 12 March 1964, the East African Standard newspaper published a report on the birth of a new club known as Abaluhya Football Club, which resulted from the amalgamation of Marama, Samia United and Bunyore; all Nairobi based clubs that were in Division 1 of the Kenya National Football League. The amalgamation process also included lower division clubs such as Kisa, Tiriki, Bukusu Brotherhood, Busamia, Lurambi, Butsotso, Bushibungo and Eshirotsa thus building its base and establishments that would make it a success in the future.

=== The 1970s and 80s: Legacy building and golden era ===
This was a period of sustained performance from the club, which brought it more fame. This included winning the Kenya National Football League in an unbeaten fashion, in the process becoming the first Kenyan club to do so.

AFC Leopards marked the 80s by marking a period of dominance majorly in the domestic and regional scene.

=== The 1990s and 2000s ===
In the 90s, achievements became less frequent, although in general, the team continued to win some championships thus never suffering a considerable title drought.

The beginning of dismal campaigns for the following 10 years, including relegation from the top tier.

== Club Identity ==
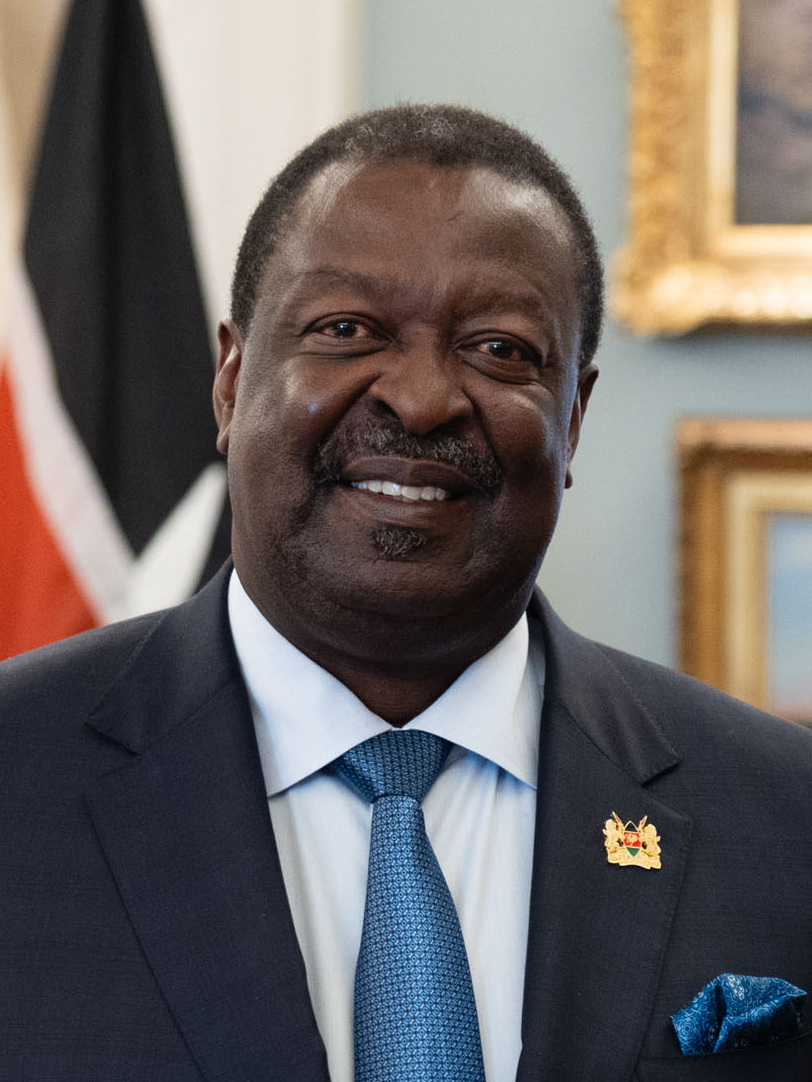
Musalia Mudavadi is amongst the many Luhya politicians to patronise A.F.C. Leopards.

A.F.C. Leopards has historical ties to the Luhya people, one of Kenya's largest ethnic groups, who are primarily located in Western Kenya. The club was founded in 1964 as Abaluhya United FC, with the purpose of providing a platform for Luhya players based in Nairobi and other areas. This origin established a cultural link between the club and the Luhya people, which has influenced its identity over the years. The connection to the Luhya community is evident in the composition of players, coaches, and officials associated with the club, many of whom come from Western Kenya, especially Kakamega and nearby counties. This regional representation has contributed to a fan base that identifies with the club through shared ethnic and cultural backgrounds. In 1978, President Daniel arap Moi reaffirmed a policy initiated under Jomo Kenyatta that required all civic and sporting organisations in Kenya to remove names with explicit ethnic identifiers. As a result, Abaluhya Football Club, which had been associated with the Luhya community since its founding in 1964, formally changed its name to All Footballers Confederation Leopards Sports Club, commonly known as A.F.C. Leopards. Nevertheless, while A.F.C. Leopards has grown to attract supporters from various parts of Kenya, the relationship with the Luhya community remains an important aspect of the club's identity.

A.F.C. Leopards has a long history of political patronage from prominent Luhya leaders. In the late 1970s and 1980s, Martin Shikuku and Moses Mudavadi (father of Musalia Mudavadi) served as early patrons, using their influence to secure employment for players in the civil service and to support club operations. More recently, Musalia Mudavadi, leader of the Amani National Congress and a lifelong Ingwe supporter, has provided direct financial assistance to the club. In June 2020, he donated KSh 633,000 to clear land rates on the 20-acre parcel allocated to the club in Kasarani and has pledged further support for a permanent stadium complex. A.F.C. Leopards has also attracted backing from other Luhya politicians, including Alfred Sambu (former Webuye East MP and ex-chairman of the club) and Cyrus Jirongo, as well as regional leaders such as Ken Lusaka and Edwin Sifuna, who in 2024 publicly endorsed plans to corporatise the club and invited wider investment to secure its financial future.

== Honours ==
=== League ===
- Kenya National Football League/Kenyan Super League/Kenyan Premier League
  - Champions (12): 1966, 1967, 1970, 1973, 1980, 1981, 1982, 1986, 1988, 1989, 1992, 1998
- Kenyan Nationwide League
  - Champions (Promoted): 2008

=== Cup ===
- FKF President's Cup: 10
  - Champions (10): 1967, 1968,1984, 1985, 1991, 1994, 2001, 2009, 2013, 2017
  - Runners-up: 1987, 1997, 2000, 2003
- CECAFA Club Cup: 5
  - Champions (5): 1979, 1982, 1983, 1984, 1997.
  - Runner's Up: 1974, 1980, 1985
- CECAFA Nile Basin Cup
  - Runners-up: 2014

== Performance in CAF competitions ==
=== African Cup of Champions Clubs/CAF Champions League ===
- First round exits: 1971, 1972, 1981, 1982, 1983, 1987, 1993, 1999
- Second round exits: 1989
- Quarter-finals: 1974, 1990
- Semi-final: 1968

=== CAF Confederation Cup ===
- Preliminary round exits: 2010

=== CAF Cup ===
- Quarter-finals: 1994, 1997

=== African Cup Winners' Cup ===
- First round exits: 1992, 1992, 2002
- Second round exits: 1986
- Quarter-final exits: 1988
- Semi-final exits: 1985

== Players ==
=== Current squad ===
As of 23 December 2025

Goalkeepers

Samuel Ambale (1)

Humphrey Katasi (22)

James Ssetuba (28)

Defenders

Kennedy Owino (27)

Peter Maker (24)

Vincent Mahiga (29)

Randy Bakari (4)

Fredrick Alushula (3)

Samwel Semo (28)

Rami Coulibaly (19)

Midfielders

Tyson Otieno (7)

Kayci Odhiambo (12)

Boniface Munyendo (18)

Musa Oundo (6)

Ronald Sichenje (30)

Kelly Madada (88)

Victor Omune (33)

Jamal Obeid (29)

Victor Otieno (50)

Deng Kang (20)

Brian Wanyama (8)

Forwards

Julius Masaba (10)

Samuel Ssenyonjo (14)

Maxwell Odongo (21)

Christopher Koloti (39)

James Kinyanjui (26)

Ellias Mugane (16)

Hassan Beja (80)

== Footballing and medical staff ==
Position	Name
Head coach	(Kenya) Fred Ambani
Assistant coach	(Kenya) Kenneth Wendo
Goalkeeper coach	(Kenya) Stephen Mbogo
Team Manager	(Kenya) Bernard Mang'oli
Team Doctor	(Kenya) Patrick Ngusale
Physiotherapist	(Kenya) Joshua Osir
Fitness coach	(Kenya) Vincent Mbwabi

|-

== Board of directors ==
Position	Name
Chairman	(Kenya) Bonface Ambani
Secretary General	(Kenya) Isaac Mulanda Mulindi
Treasurer	(Kenya) Newton Lime Luchacha

== Coaches and managers ==
(Kenya)	Jonathan Niva	1966–1970
(Kenya)	Jonathan Niva	1973–1977
(Uganda)	Robert Kiberu	1979–1984
(Austria)	Gerry Saurer	1984–1985
(Wales)	Graham Williams	1986–1987
(Kenya)	Joe Masiga	1987 (player/manager)
(Ghana)	Charles Gyamfi	1988–1991
(Malawi)	Reuben Malola	1991–1993
(Netherlands)	Jan Koops	2012
(Belgium)	Luc Eymael	2013
(Kenya)	James Nandwa	2013-2014
(Netherlands)	Hendrik Pieter De Jongh	2014
(Croatia)	Zdravko Logarušić	2015
(Netherlands)	Jan Koops	2016
(Belgium)	Ivan Minnaert	2016
(England)	Stewart Hall	2016–2017
(Romania)	Dorian Marin	2017
(Kenya)	Robert Matano	2017–2018
(Argentina)	Rodolfo Zapata	2018
(Serbia)	Nikola Kavazović	2018
(Serbia)	Marko Vasiljević	2018–2019
(Rwanda)	Andre Cassa Mbungo	2019–2020
(Kenya)	Anthony Kimani	2020
(Czech Republic)	Tomáš Trucha	2020
(Kenya)	Anthony Kimani†	2020–2021
(Belgium)	Patrick Aussems	2021–2023
(Czech Republic)	Tomáš Trucha	2023–2024
(Kenya)	Fred Ambani	2024–

== See also ==
- A.F.C. Leopards–Gor Mahia rivalry
