= FKF President's Cup =

Association football tournament

- Founded: 1954
- Region: Kenya
- Domestic cup: Kenyan Super Cup
- International cup: CAF Confederation Cup
- Current champions: Nairobi United Football Club (1st title)
- Most championships: A.F.C. Leopards (10 titles)
- Nairobi United 2025 Mozzart Bet Cup

The FKF President's Cup is the top knockout tournament in Kenyan football and is the Kenyan equivalent to the FA Cup. It was started in the 1950s, but during its existence, the knockout tournament has had different names depending on largely, sponsorship, and as determined by the administration in charge.

The winner of the Cup receives a direct ticket to represent Kenya in Africa's second-tier competition, lately known as the CAF Confederation Cup.

In 2003 two different cup competitions were held in Kenya - due to politics - because the 4 semi-finalists of the President's Cup withdrew from the KFF and continued with their "Transparency Cup" while the KFF continued their tournament with already eliminated clubs. The 2020 edition was halted due to the COVID-19 pandemic, just a year after Betway betting firm was announced as the title sponsor. It continued in 2021 but was not played in 2022 due to a Government takeover of Kenyan football. The competition returned in 2023 as Mozzart Bet Cup following sponsorship from the gaming firm.

== Winners ==
FA Cup of Kenya				Ref
1954	RAF Eastleigh	1-0	Nakuru Railway African Football Team	
1955	Unknown			
1956	Mombasa Liverpool			
1957	Unknown			
1958	Mombasa Liverpool		Feisal FC Mombasa	
1959		-	Maragoli United	
1960	Marama	4–2	Gethin & Dawson	
1961	LASCO Mombasa	8-2	Nyaribari FC	
1962	Mombasa Liverpool			
1964	Luo Union			
1965	Luo Union		Kisumu Hotstars FC	
1966	Luo Union	4–2	Mombasa Liverpool	
1967	Abaluhya United	3–0	Maragoli United	
1968	Abaluhya United	2-2 (w/o)	Feisal FC Mombasa	
1969	Nakuru AllStars	1–0	Gor Mahia	
1970	Nakuru AllStars	3-2	Gor Mahia	
1971	Unknown			
1972	Unknown			
1973	Unknown			
1974	Unknown			
1975	Tusker FC			
Kenya Challenge Cup				Ref
1976	Luo Union	3-2 (a.p.)	KFA	
1977	Unknown			
1978	Unknown			
1979	Ramogi FC	awarded	Kisumu Hotstars FC	
1980	Unknown			
1981	Gor Mahia			
1982	Unknown			
1983	Gor Mahia			
1984	AFC Leopards	2–1	Gor Mahia	
1985	AFC Leopards			
Moi Golden Cup				Ref
1986	Gor Mahia	1–0	Bandari FC	
1987	Gor Mahia	2–0	AFC Leopards	
1988	Gor Mahia	beat	Tusker FC	
1989	Tusker FC	1–1 (5–4)	AFC Leopards	
1990	Rivatex	2-1	Bata Bullets	
1991	AFC Leopards	1–0	Gor Mahia	
1992	Kenya Breweries	2–0	Bata Bullets	
1993	Tusker FC			
1994	AFC Leopards	3–0	Kisumu Posta	
1995	Rivatex	2–0	Ulinzi Stars	
1996	Mumias Sugar	1–0	Reli FC	
1997	Eldoret KCC	4–1	AFC Leopards	
1998	Mathare United	2–1	Eldoret KCC	
1999	Mumias Sugar	3–2 (a.p.)	Coast Stars	
2000	Mathare United	2–1 (a.p.)	AFC Leopards	
2001	AFC Leopards	2–0	Mathare United	
2002	Kenya Pipeline	1–0	Mumias Sugar	
Transparency Cup				Ref
2003	Utalii	2–1	Gor Mahia	
2004	KCB	1–0	Thika United	
President's Cup				Ref
2003	Chemelil Sugar	1–0	AFC Leopards	
2005	World Hope FC	2–1	Tusker FC	
2006	Interrupted			
2007	Sofapaka	2–0	Homegrown F.C.	
KFF Cup				Ref
2008	Gor Mahia	2–0	Posta Rangers	
FKL Cup
2009	AFC Leopards	4–1	Congo United	
2010	Sofapaka	2–0	West Kenya Sugar	
2011	Gor Mahia	1–0	Sofapaka	
FKF President's Cup				Ref
2012	Gor Mahia	3–0 (a.p.)	Sofapaka	
GOtv Shield Cup				Ref
2013	AFC Leopards	1–0	Gor Mahia	
2014	Sofapaka	2–1	Posta Rangers	
2015	Bandari FC	4–2	Nakumatt	
2016	Tusker	1–0	Ulinzi Stars	
2017	AFC Leopards	2–0	Kariobangi Sharks	
SportPesa Shield				Ref
2018	Kariobangi Sharks	3–2	Sofapaka	
2019	Bandari FC	3–1	Kariobangi Sharks	(Note: The 2019 final was played over two days due to rainfall, the first half took place 1 June 2019, the second half began at 11am on 2 June 2019.)
Betway Cup				Ref
2020	Interrupted by Corona Virus			
2021	Gor Mahia	4-1 (a.p.)	AFC Leopards	
2022	Not held			
Mozzart Bet Cup				Ref
2023	Kakamega Homeboyz	1-0	Tusker	
2024	Kenya Police	8-7 (a.p.)	KCB	
2025	Nairobi United	2-1	Gor Mahia	
2026	Tusker FC	2-1	Kenya Police	
