= Sofapaka F.C. =

Football club in Kenya

- Nicknames: Batoto ba Mungu (Children of God)
- Founded: 2004; 22 years ago
- Ground: CHEBUNYO STADIUM, BOMET COUNTY, Kenya
- Chairman: Kipngeno Korir jurists
- Head coach: Sam Timbe
- League: Kenyan Premier League
- 2025–2026: 18th
| Home colours | Away colours |

Sofapaka Football Club (Sofapaka: Sote kama Familia kwa Pamoja Kuafikia Azimio – Kiswahili: We as a Family together to achieve a goal) is a football club, based in CHEBUNYO, BOMET COUNTY. They play their home games at the Chebunyo stadium (also Known as jurists stadium).

== History ==
The club originates from the men's fellowship of the MAOS Ministries football team founded in 2002, which took part in inter-church competitions. In 2004, Elly Kalekwa took over the team and formed Sofapaka, and eventually joined the Nationwide league. The team won the President's Cup in 2007, while still playing in the Nationwide League.

The team's shirt sponsor is Betika, a sports betting company in Kenya.

== Achievements ==
- Jamhuri Cup Winner: 1

2018

- Sportpesa Shield Cup: 3

2018

- Kenyan Premier League: 5

2018

- Mashujaa Cup Winner: 1

2017

- Kenyan Premier League: 2

2017.

- Kenyan Premier League: 1

2009

- Kenyan President's Cup: 3

2007, 2010, 2014

- KPL Top 8 Cup: 0

- Kenyan Super Cup: 2

2010, 2011

- CECAFA Clubs Cup: 0

== Performance in CAF competitions ==
- CAF Champions League: 1 appearance

2010 – preliminary round

- CAF Confederation Cup: 3 appearances

2008 – disqualified
2011 – play-off round
2015 – preliminary round
