= Tusker F.C. =

Kenyan football club

Tusker
- Full name: Tusker Football Club
- Nickname: The Brewers
- Short name: TFC
- Founded: 1969; 57 years ago (as Kenya Breweries)
- Ground: Ruaraka Stadium; Nyayo National Stadium (selected matches)
- Capacity: 4,000; 18,000
- Chairman: Charles Gacheru
- Head coach: Julien Mette
- League: Kenyan Premier League
- 2025–26: KPL, 9th of 18
- Website: https://tuskerfc.com/men/
Home colours	Away colours

Tusker FC is a professional football club based in Nairobi. It is the second most successful club in Kenya with 13 league championships. They also have four cup titles. In addition, it has won four East African CECAFA Clubs Cup titles.

The club was formed in 1969, and is sponsored by the East African Breweries. The club was known as Kenya Breweries until 1999, when the current name was adopted. Tusker plays some home games at the 15,000-capacity Kinoru Stadium in Meru. The club played in the first ever match against the South Sudan national team, following the latter's creation. Tusker won the match 3–1.

== Honours ==
- Kenyan Premier League: 13

1972, 1977, 1978, 1994, 1996, 1999, 2000, 2007, 2011, 2012, 2016, 2020–21, 2021–22

- FKF President's Cup: 5

1975, 1989, 1993, 2016, 2025

- Kenyan Super Cup: 4

2012, 2013 (post-season), 2021,2026

- KPL Top 8 Cup: 2

2013, 2014
