= 2014 Kenyan National Super League =

Kenyan sports competition

Kenyan National Super League
- Season: 2014
- Promoted: Kakamega Homeboyz; Nakumatt; Posta Rangers; Shabana
- Relegated: Administration Police; Mahakama; Rift Valley United; Vegpro
- Note: Walkovers counted in matches played but not counted in goals scored.

Zone A
- Champions: Posta Rangers
- Matches: 132
- Goals: 251 (1.9 per match)
- Top goalscorer: Peter Nzuki (13 goals)
- Biggest home win: Ligi Ndogo 5–1 Administration Police (24 May 2014)
- Biggest away win: Kariobangi Sharks 0–5 FC Talanta (25 May 2014)
- Highest scoring: Ligi Ndogo 4–3 FC Talanta (15 March 2014)
- All statistics correct as of 2 November 2014.

Zone B
- Matches: 86
- Goals: 178 (2.07 per match)
- Top goalscorer: Cornelius Juma (8 goals)
- Biggest home win: 9 matches: Zoo Kericho 5–2 Karuturi Sports (5 April 2014); Shabana 4–1 Rift Valley United (6 April 2014); Zoo Kericho 4–1 Busia United Stars (12 April 2014); Kakamega Homeboyz 3–0 Zoo Kericho (19 April 2014); West Kenya Sugar 3–0 Rift Valley United (20 April 2014); Zoo Kericho 3–0 G.F.C. 105 (17 May 2014); Agrochemical 3–0 Rift Valley United (24 May 2014); Kakamega Homeboyz 3–0 Rift Valley United (3 August 2014); Zoo Kericho 4–1 Rift Valley United (16 August 2014)
- Biggest away win: Karuturi Sports 0–4 Shabana (19 April 2014)
- Highest scoring: Zoo Kericho 5–2 Karuturi Sports (5 April 2014)
- All statistics correct as of 6 September 2014.

The 2014 Kenyan National Super League was the inaugural season of the Kenyan National Super League since being established on 10 July 2013, and the 51st second division season since its establishment in 1963. Competition was scheduled to begin on 8 March, but was postponed and instead began a week later on 15 March.

A total of 24 teams, divided into 2 zones of 12 teams each, competed for the league, with 22 promoted from FKF Division One, which has since become the third tier of the Kenyan football league system after the introduction of the National Super League, and 2 teams relegated from the Kenyan Premier League. The top two teams from each zone, Kakamega Homeboyz, Nakumatt, Posta Rangers and Shabana, all gained promotion to the Premier League for the 2015 season, which is set to be contested by 18 teams, up from 16 for the 2014 season.

== Changes from last season ==
Locations of the 2014 Kenyan National Super League teams.
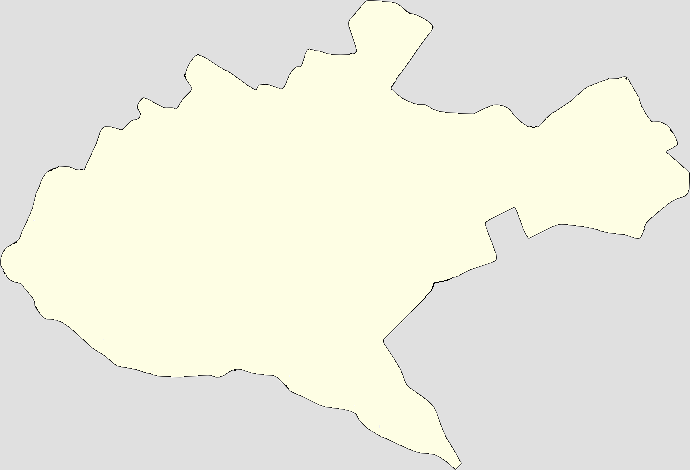
Locations of the 2014 Kenyan National Super League teams within Nairobi.

=== From Division One ===
Promoted to Premier League

- Kenya Revenue Authority
- Top Fry AllStars

Remaining in Division One

- Admiral
- Alaskan
- Brighter Stars
- Coast United
- Comply
- FC West Ham United
- Field Negroes
- Green Berets
- Gusii Raiders
- Jericho AllStars
- Kambakia Christian Centre
- Kibera Celtic
- Kisero
- Kisumu Municipal
- Kolongolo
- Longonot Horticulture
- Mount Kenya United
- Mumbi Nationale
- Mumcop
- Sparki Youth
- Suam Orchards
- Timsales
- Utawala
- Vihiga Stars

=== To National Super League ===
Relegated from Premier League

- Kakamega Homeboyz
- Karuturi Sports

Promoted from FKF Division One

- Administration Police
- Agrochemical
- Bidco United
- Busia United Stars
- FC Talanta
- Finlays Horticulture
- G.F.C. 105
- Hotsprings FC
- Kariobangi Sharks
- Ligi Ndogo
- Mahakama
- Modern Coast Rangers
- MOYAS
- Nairobi Stima
- Nakumatt
- Nzoia United
- Oserian
- Posta Rangers
- Shabana
- St. Joseph
- West Kenya Sugar
- Zoo Kericho

=== Team name changes ===
- Hotsprings to Rift Valley United
- Karuturi Sports to Vegpro

== Teams ==
Team	Zone	Location	Stadium	Capacity
Administration Police	A	Nairobi	APTC Ground	Unknown
Agrochemical	B	Muhoroni	Muhoroni Stadium	20,000
Bidco United	A	Thika	Del Monte Grounds	Unknown
Busia United Stars	B	Busia	Busia Stadium	Unknown
FC Talanta	A	Nairobi	Ruaraka Stadium	5,000
Finlays Horticulture	B	Naivasha	Kingfisher Grounds	Unknown
G.F.C. 105	B	Eldoret	The Discipleship Grounds	Unknown
Kakamega Homeboyz	B	Kakamega	Bukhungu Stadium	5,000
Kariobangi Sharks	A	Nairobi	Nairobi City Stadium	15,000
Ligi Ndogo	A	Nairobi	Ligi Ndogo Grounds	2,000
Mahakama	A	Nairobi	Nairobi City Stadium	15,000
Modern Coast Rangers	A	Mombasa	Refinery Grounds	Unknown
MOYAS	A	Nairobi	Lang'ata Prison Ground	Unknown
Nairobi Stima	A	Nairobi	Nairobi City Stadium	15,000
Nakumatt	A	Nairobi	Ruaraka Stadium	5,000
Nzoia United	B	Bungoma	Kanduyi Stadium	Unknown
Oserian	A	Naivasha	Oserian Grounds	Unknown
Posta Rangers	A	Nairobi	Hope Centre	5,000
Rift Valley United	B	Eldoret	Unknown stadium	Unknown
Shabana	B	Kisii	Gusii Stadium	5,000
St. Joseph	B	Nakuru	Unknown stadium	Unknown
Vegpro	B	Naivasha	Naivasha Stadium	5,000
West Kenya Sugar	B	Kakamega	Bukhungu Stadium	5,000
Zoo Kericho	B	Kericho	Green Stadium	5,000

== League tables and results ==
=== Zone A ===
==== League table ====
Pos	Team	Pld	W	D	L	GF	GA	GD	Pts	Qualification or relegation
1	Posta Rangers (C, P)	22	17	3	2	40	13	+27	54	Promotion to 2015 Kenyan Premier League (Note: The winners of the 2014 FKF President's Cup will qualify for the 2015 CAF Confederation Cup.)
2	Nakumatt (P)	22	13	5	4	26	10	+16	44	Promotion to 2015 Kenyan Premier League
3	FC Talanta	22	11	6	5	30	19	+11	39	
4	Oserian	22	8	7	7	24	20	+4	31	
5	Nairobi Stima	22	8	7	7	20	18	+2	31	
6	Ligi Ndogo	22	6	10	6	21	21	0	28	
7	Bidco United	22	6	9	7	17	18	−1	27	
8	Kariobangi Sharks	22	5	9	8	19	25	−6	24	
9	MOYAS	22	6	5	11	17	22	−5	23	
10	Modern Coast Rangers	22	4	9	9	11	19	−8	21	
11	Administration Police (R)	22	4	7	11	11	27	−16	19	Relegation to 2015 FKF Division One
12	Mahakama (R)	22	3	5	14	15	39	−24	14	Relegation to 2015 FKF Division One

Updated to match(es) played on 2 November 2014. Source: Kenyan National Super League
Rules for classification: 1) points; 2) goal difference; 3) number of goals scored.
(C) Champions; (P) Promoted; (R) Relegated

==== Positions by round ====
The table lists the positions of teams after each week of matches. In order to preserve chronological evolvements, any postponed matches are not included to the round at which they were originally scheduled, but added to the full round they were played immediately afterwards. For example, if a match is scheduled for matchday 13, but then postponed and played between days 16 and 17, it will be added to the standings for day 16.

Team ╲ Round	1	2	3	4	5	6	7	8	9	10	11	12	13	14	15	16	17	18	19	20	21	22
Posta Rangers	5	2	1	1	1	1	1	1	1	1	1	1	1	1	1	1	1	1	1	1	1	1
Nakumatt	6	10	8	9	7	4	2	2	2	2	3	3	3	3	2	3	2	2	2	2	2	2
FC Talanta	9	6	6	4	2	2	3	3	3	3	2	2	2	2	3	2	3	3	3	3	3	3
Oserian	2	1	3	3	4	5	4	5	6	8	4	4	4	4	4	5	4	4	4	5	4	4
Nairobi Stima	4	3	7	8	10	9	7	7	5	6	6	6	5	5	5	4	5	5	5	4	6	5
Ligi Ndogo	1	8	9	5	5	7	8	8	7	5	5	5	6	6	6	6	6	6	6	6	5	6
Bidco United	11	11	11	10	9	10	10	10	10	7	8	8	8	8	8	7	7	7	7	7	7	7
Kariobangi Sharks	8	5	5	6	6	6	9	4	4	4	7	7	7	7	7	8	9	10	11	11	9	8
MOYAS	10	9	10	11	11	12	12	12	12	12	12	12	12	12	12	12	11	9	10	10	11	9
Modern Coast Rangers	12	12	12	12	12	11	11	11	11	11	9	9	9	9	9	9	8	8	8	9	8	10
Administration Police	7	4	2	2	3	3	5	6	8	9	11	11	11	10	10	10	10	11	9	8	10	11
Mahakama	3	7	4	7	8	8	6	9	9	10	10	10	10	11	11	11	12	12	12	12	12	12

Leader
Promotion to the 2015 Kenyan Premier League
Relegation to the 2015 FKF Division One

Updated to match(es) played on 2 November 2014. Source: futaa.com

==== Results ====
Home \ Away	APO	BCU	FCT	KBS	LGI	MAH	MCR	MYS	NST	NKM	OSE	PRN
Administration Police		0–2	1–1	0–0	1–2	1–0	0–1	2–1	0–0	0–0	3–2	0–3
Bidco United	1–0		0–0	2–1	0–0	1–2	0–0	2–0	1–0	1–1	0–0	1–2
FC Talanta	1–0	2–2		0–2	1–1	2–1	2–0	2–1	3–2	1–0	1–0	1–1
Kariobangi Sharks	0–0	1–1	0–5		1–3	3–0	2–1	1–1	1–2	1–0	0–0	1–1
Ligi Ndogo	5–1	0–0	4–3	1–1		1–0	0–0	0–1	0–0	0–3	1–1	0–2
Mahakama	0–1	1–1	0–2	2–2	0–2		2–2	0–3	0–2	1–2	0–3	3–2
Modern Coast Rangers	0–0	1–0	0–0	1–0	1–1	1–0		0–0	0–1	0–0	1–1	1–2
MOYAS	1–0	2–0	0–2	0–1	1–0	0–1	1–0		0–1	0–1	2–3	1–3
Nairobi Stima	0–0	0–2	1–0	0–0	0–0	2–2	1–0	1–1		1–2	2–0	1–2
Nakumatt	2–0	2–0	2–0	2–0	1–0	1–0	2–0	0–0	1–0		2–1	1–1
Oserian	3–1	1–0	0–1	2–1	0–0	0–0	2–0	1–1	1–2	2–1		1–0
Posta Rangers	2–0	2–0	1–0	1–0	3–0	5–0	2–1	1–0	2–1	1–0	1–0	

Updated to match(es) played on 2 November 2014. Source: 2014 Kenyan National Super League
Legend: Blue = home team win; Yellow = draw; Red = away team win.

=== Zone B ===
==== League table ====
Pos	Team	Pld	W	D	L	GF	GA	GD	Pts	Qualification or relegation
1	Agrochemical	16	11	3	2	21	7	+14	36	Promotion to 2015 Kenyan Premier League (Note: The winners of the 2014 FKF President's Cup will qualify for the 2015 CAF Confederation Cup.)
2	Kakamega Homeboyz	14	10	2	2	23	9	+14	32	
3	Zoo Kericho	14	10	1	3	28	14	+14	31	
4	Shabana	15	9	1	5	23	11	+12	28	
5	West Kenya Sugar	16	8	4	4	19	12	+7	28	
6	St. Joseph	14	6	6	2	13	9	+4	24	
7	Finlays Horticulture	14	6	2	6	13	11	+2	20	
8	Nzoia United	15	5	5	5	16	16	0	20	
9	Busia United Stars	15	5	2	8	11	20	−9	17	
10	G.F.C. 105	15	1	3	11	7	21	−14	6	
11	Vegpro	14	0	3	11	7	26	−19	3	Relegation to 2015 FKF Division One
12	Rift Valley United	14	1	0	13	5	30	−25	3	Relegation to 2015 FKF Division One

Updated to match(es) played on 6 September 2014. Source: Kenyan National Super League
Rules for classification: 1) points; 2) goal difference; 3) number of goals scored.

==== Positions by round ====
The table lists the positions of teams after each week of matches. In order to preserve chronological evolvements, any postponed matches are not included to the round at which they were originally scheduled, but added to the full round they were played immediately afterwards. For example, if a match is scheduled for matchday 13, but then postponed and played between days 16 and 17, it will be added to the standings for day 16.

Team ╲ Round	1	2	3	4	5	6	7	8	9	10	11	12	13	14	15	16	17	18	19	20	21	22
Agrochemical	10	5	7	5	5	4	5	7	8	6	3	3	2	2	1							
Kakamega Homeboyz	4	1	1	3	1	1	1	1	1	2	2	1	1	1	2							
Zoo Kericho	9	10	11	4	3	6	2	2	2	1	1	2	3	3	3							
Shabana	3	6	6	6	6	5	6	8	5	7	7	5	7	7	4							
West Kenya Sugar	7	7	8	1	4	2	3	5	6	5	5	6	5	5	5							
St. Joseph	6	8	9	10	10	9	8	4	4	3	4	4	4	4	6							
Finlays Horticulture	11	11	4	8	8	7	9	9	9	9	8	8	9	8	7							
Nzoia United	5	2	2	7	7	8	7	6	7	8	9	9	8	9	8							
Busia United Stars	1	3	3	2	2	3	4	3	3	4	6	7	6	6	9							
G.F.C. 105	2	4	5	9	9	10	10	10	10	10	10	10	10	10	10							
Vegpro	8	9	10	11	12	12	12	12	12	12	11	11	11	11	11							
Rift Valley United	12	12	12	12	11	11	11	11	11	11	12	12	12	12	12							

Leader
Relegation to the 2015 FKF Division One

Updated to match(es) played on 24 August 2014. Source: futaa.com

==== Results ====
Home \ Away	AGC	BUS	FLH	GFC	KHB	VGP	NZU	RVU	SHB	STJ	WKS	ZOO
Agrochemical			1–0		1–1	2–1		3–0	1–0	1–0	0–0	
Busia United Stars	1–0		1–1		0–2 (Note: Kakamega Homeboyz were handed a walkover with 3 points and 2 goals after Busia United Stars failed to turn up for the match.)		0–2		0–0	1–1		0–1
Finlays Horticulture	2–1	1–2		1–0		1–0			0–1	1–2	1–0	
G.F.C. 105	0–1	0–1			0–1			1–0	0–0	0–0		
Kakamega Homeboyz			1–0	2–1			2–1	3–0	1–2			3–0
Vegpro	0–3	0–1	0–1	2–2	0–2		1–1		0–4	1–2	0–1	
Nzoia United	1–2	0–2	0–0	2–0	1–1					0–0	1–2	2–1
Rift Valley United		1–2	0–3		1–2	1–0	0–1		0–2			0–1
Shabana	1–2			2–1			3–1	4–1		1–2	0–1	0–2
St. Joseph				2–0	1–0		1–1	1–0			1–1	0–0
West Kenya Sugar	0–0	2–0 (Note: West Kenya Sugar were handed a walkover with 3 points and 2 goals after Busia United Stars failed to turn up for the match.)		3–2	1–2	0–0		3–0	1–0	1–2		
Zoo Kericho		4–1	2–1	3–0		5–2	1–2	4–1			3–2	

Updated to match(es) played on 6 September 2014. Source: 2014 Kenyan National Super League
Legend: Blue = home team win; Yellow = draw; Red = away team win.

== Top scorers ==
=== Zone A ===
Rank	Player	Club	Goals
1	(Kenya) Peter Nzuki	Nakumatt	13
2	(Kenya) Dennis Mukaisi	Posta Rangers	10
3	(Kenya) Nicholas Ayianga	Nairobi Stima	9
4	(Kenya) Christopher Nyamao	Posta Rangers	7
5	(Kenya) Fredrick Ojwang	Posta Rangers	6
6	(Kenya) Aziz Okaka	FC Talanta	5
6	(Kenya) Jacob Onyango	Nakumatt	5
6	(Kenya) Timothy Otieno	FC Talanta	5
9	(Kenya) Rama Iddi	Ligi Ndogo	4
9	(Kenya) Joseph Nyaga	Posta Rangers	4
9	(Kenya) Gordon Okoth	Oserian	4
9	(Kenya) Bernard Ongoma	FC Talanta	4
9	(Kenya) Brian Yator	Ligi Ndogo	4

Last updated: 2 November 2014

=== Zone B ===
Rank	Player	Club	Goals
1	(Kenya) Cornelius Juma	Shabana	8
2	(Kenya) Joseph Karamoja	Finlays Horticulture	7
3	(Kenya) Edmund Murai	Kakamega Homeboyz	5
4	(Kenya) Masoud Juma	Shabana	4
4	(Kenya) Daniel Ochieng	West Kenya Sugar	4
4	(Kenya) Norman Werunga	Nzoia United	4
7	(Kenya) Andrew Kulecho	Kakamega Homeboyz	3
7	(Kenya) Moses Mudavadi	Kakamega Homeboyz	3
7	(Kenya) Bernard Odhiambo	Zoo Kericho	3
10	14 players		2

Last updated: 6 September 2014
