= 2012 FKF Division One =

FKF Division One
- Season: 2012
- Note: Walkovers counted in matches played but not counted in goals scored.

Zone A
- Champions: Bandari
- Promoted: Bandari
- Relegated: KSL Thola Glass; Gatundu Stars; Iron Strikers; Mathare Youth (disbanded)
- Matches: 361
- Goals: 855 (2.37 per match)
- Top goalscorer: Roosevelt Blaty; Admiral (32 goals)
- Biggest home win: Bandari 6–0 Iron Strikers (10 March 2012); MOYAS 6–0 Kibera Celtic (12 August 2012)
- Biggest away win: Green Berets 0–4 Ligi Ndogo (26 May 2012)
- Highest scoring: Admiral 6–2 Green Berets (2 June 2012)
- All statistics correct as of 18 November 2012.

Zone B
- Champions: Kakamega Homeboyz
- Promoted: Kakamega Homeboyz
- Relegated: Karungu; Outgrowers; Yanga; H.B.C. Mlimani
- Matches: 380
- Goals: 920 (2.42 per match)
- Top goalscorer: Valen Semi Mahero; Nzoia United (26 goals)
- Biggest home win: Nakuru AllStars 9–0 H.B.C. Mlimani (17 June 2012)
- Biggest away win: Yanga 0–5 Nzoia United (26 May 2012)
- Highest scoring: Nakuru AllStars 9–0 H.B.C. Mlimani (17 June 2012)
- All statistics correct as of 18 November 2012.

The 2012 FKF Division One was the inaugural season of FKF Division One and the 49th second division season since it began in 1963. It began on 3 March with Kariobangi Sharks and Congo JMJ United in Zone A and on the same date with Kakamega Homeboyz and Kisumu Municipal in Zone B, and ended on 18 November with Nairobi Stima and MOYAS in Zone A and on the same date with Timsales and Yanga in Zone B.

Compared to the 2010 season of the then Nationwide League, the 2011 season of the FKL and KFF Nationwide League was considered to be a lot better because of major improvements in integrity of referees and playing surfaces. The major complaints of occurrences in 2010 were significantly reduced after the establishment of the NFL Oversight Committee, which closely monitored Football Kenya Limited's running of the league.

Halfway through the season (after 19 matches), Kakamega Homeboyz had been unbeaten with a record of 10-9-0 (10 wins, 9 draws, no losses). They would have become only the second club in Kenya to complete an unbeaten season, after Gor Mahia in the 1976 Kenya National Football League, but were beaten 1−0 against Nakuru AllStars on 22 July 2012, ending their unbeaten record of 23 games. On the other hand, H.B.C. Mlimani hadn't won a single match after 19 games (with a record of 0-3-16: no wins, 3 draws, 16 losses) and were en route to becoming the first club in Kenya and only the fifth in modern football to complete a domestic season without winning a match. However, through a walkover they were awarded over Yanga on 29 September 2012, their winless run of 28 games came to an end.

On 31 August, Mathare Youth disbanded and therefore pulled out of the league, after which the FKF decided to scrap all of their second round results. This meant that all teams that had played against Mathare Youth had their points revoked or given back, depending on the results of the matches, and all upcoming fixtures involving Mathare Youth were cancelled. As a result, the season would end with every other team having played 37 games instead of 38, and the total number of matches would add up to 361, 19 games less than the usual 380.

Since the league had 19 teams left, in accordance with an FKF ruling, this meant that the 16th-placed team was also to be relegated according to the rules of the league.

As of 7 October 2012, Yanga, having 10 points with 6 matches left to play, are to be relegated at the end of the season as 18 possible points from 6 possible wins would level them with Comply, who are also in the relegation zone. H.B.C. Mlimani, having 6 points with 7 matches left to play, are also to be relegated at the end of the season as 21 points from 7 possible wins would ultimately give them 27 points, one less than Comply, as of the same date.

On 4 November 2012, Bandari and Kakamega Homeboyz earned early promotions to the Kenyan Premier League. As of that date, Bandari earned 76 points from 35 matches, 8 points ahead of second-placed Mahakama, who earned 68 points from 36 matches. With 2 matches left to play for the latter, 2 wins would take them to 74 points, which would not be enough to reach the former. Kakamega Homeboyz earned 87 points from 36 matches, also 8 points ahead of the second-placed team, Nzoia United, who earned 79 points from 36 matches. 2 wins from 2 matches left to play for the latter would take them to 85 points, which would not be enough to reach the former. However, third-placed Agrochemical, with 78 points from 35 matches, can catch up to the leaders, but with a +29 goal difference, they would have to score 25 goals in and win their remaining 3 matches to reach the top of the table.

== Changes from last season ==
Locations of the 2012 FKF Division One teams.
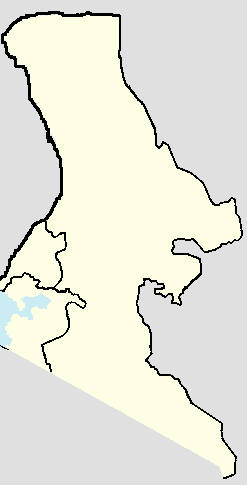
Locations of the 2012 FKF Division One teams within Rift Valley, Nyanza and Western.
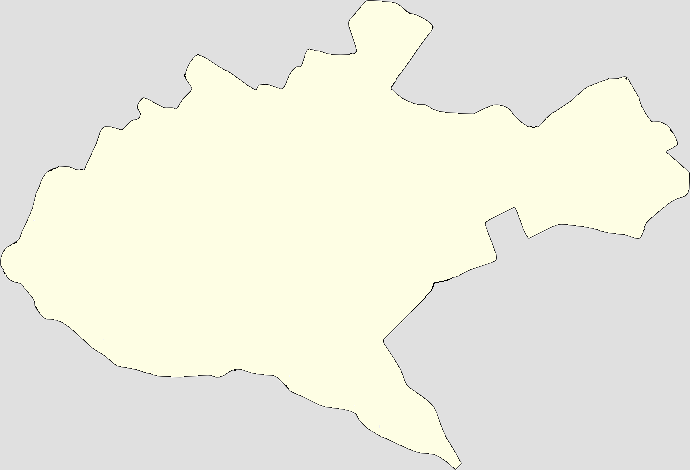
Locations of the 2012 FKF Division One teams within Nairobi.
Locations of the 2012 FKF Division One teams within downtown Mombasa.

After the 2011 season, the FKL Nationwide League and the KFF Nationwide League were fused, meaning that two teams were to be promoted and four relegated, and that only two from the Provincial Leagues could be promoted due to the current format of having two zones of 16 teams each.

=== From FKL and KFF ===
Promoted to Premier League

- Muhoroni Youth
- Oserian

Relegated to Provincial League

- Annex 07
- Kiambaa United
- Makarios
- Nanyuki
- Opera
- Real Kisumu
- Strathmore University

=== To Division One ===
Relegated from Premier League

- Bandari
- Congo JMJ United

Promoted from Division Two

- Coast United
- G.F.C. 105
- Green Berets
- Kakamega Homeboyz
- West Kenya Sugar (promoted as Kabrass United)
- Zoo Kericho

== Teams ==
=== Stadia and locations ===
==== Zone A ====
Zone A clubs are from the Nairobi, Central, Eastern and Coast provinces.

Club	Home stadium	Town/City
Administration Police	Hope Centre	Nairobi
Admiral	Mbaraki Stadium	Mombasa
Bandari	Mombasa Municipal Stadium	Mombasa
Bidco United	Del Monte Grounds	Thika
Coast United	Tudor Sports Ground	Mombasa
Congo JMJ United	Mombasa Municipal Stadium	Mombasa
Gatundu Stars	Juja Premier Grounds	Juja
Green Berets	PSTC Ruiru	Ruiru
Iron Strikers	Apostle Grounds	Mombasa
Kariobangi Sharks	Nairobi City Stadium	Nairobi
Kenya Revenue Authority	Hope Centre	Nairobi
Kibera Celtic	Woodley Grounds	Nairobi
KSL Thola Glass	Kenya School of Law	Nairobi
Ligi Ndogo	Ligi Ndogo Grounds	Nairobi
Magongo Rangers	Refinery Grounds	Mombasa
Mahakama	Nairobi City Stadium	Nairobi
Mathare Youth	Ruaraka Sports Ground	Nairobi
MOYAS	Nairobi City Stadium	Nairobi
Nairobi Stima	Nairobi City Stadium	Nairobi
Sparki Youth	Refinery Grounds	Mombasa

==== Zone B ====
Zone B teams are from the Western, Nyanza and Rift Valley provinces.

Club	Home stadium	Town/city
Agrochemical	Muhoroni Stadium	Muhoroni
Comply	Afraha Stadium	Nakuru
Finlays Horticulture	Kingfisher Grounds	Naivasha
G.F.C. 105	The Discipleship Grounds	Eldoret
H.B.C. Milimani		Homa Bay
Kakamega Homeboyz	Bukhungu Stadium	Kakamega
Karungu	Sori Grounds	Homa Bay
Kisumu Municipal	Moi Stadium	Kisumu
Longonot Horticulture	Kingfisher Grounds	Naivasha
Nakuru AllStars	Afraha Stadium	Nakuru
Nzoia United	Sudi Stadium	Bungoma
Outgrowers	Unknown stadium	Busia
Rush	Bukhungu Stadium	Kakamega
Shabana Kisii	Gusii Stadium	Kisii
SOIN Fluorspar	Fluorspar Ground	Kerio Valley
Timsales		Elburgon
Utawala	Afraha Stadium	Nakuru
West Kenya Sugar^{1}	Bukhungu Stadium	Kakamega
Yanga	Nyahururu Stadium	Nyahururu
Zoo Kericho	Green Stadium	Kericho

^{1} Kabrass United changed their name back to West Kenya Sugar to promote their club sponsors of the same name.

=== Managerial changes ===
As of July 22, 2012.

Zone A
Team	Outgoing manager	Manner of departure	Date of vacancy	Position in table	Incoming manager	Date of appointment
Gatundu Stars	(Kenya) Shadrack Ateka	Resigned	June 2012	12th	Reinstated	July 2012
Ligi Ndogo	(Democratic Republic of the Congo) Ibrahim Mbikalo	Sent to coach U16 team	18 April 2012	5th	(Kenya) Mike Kamure	13 May 2012
Mahakama	(Kenya) Peter Ambetsa	Sacked	July 2012	4th	(Kenya) Ezekiel Akwana	9 July 2012

Zone B
Team	Outgoing manager	Manner of departure	Date of vacancy	Position in table	Incoming manager	Date of appointment
Karungu	(Kenya) Bernard Kizito	Sacked	N/A		(Kenya) Henry Adero	24 May 2012
West Kenya Sugar	N/A				(Kenya) Nick Yakhama	5 July 2012

== Sparki Youth scandals ==
=== Coast United match cancellation ===
Sparki Youth and Coast United were punished by the FKF through a deduction of 1 point and 1 loss added to their tallies for willingly deciding not to face each other on 1 May, after it was first believed that the FKF had postponed the match.

=== Admiral referee assault ===
During their match against Admiral on 22 September, main referee Martin Wekesa was knocked on his genitalia, after which he was further assaulted and left hospitalised by a group of individuals just as he was about to show a red card to Sparki Youth striker Tobias Baraza for a second bookable offence. By the time the match was abandoned in the 88th minute, Admiral were leading 1−0 following a penalty scored by Roosevelt Blaty in the 63rd minute. Following the attacks, the FKF's National Executive Committee held a meeting on 26 September to decide on the fate of the match and punishment to be given. Admiral were awarded a win with 3 points and their 1-goal, while the following individuals in contract at Sparki Youth were punished as follows:

Name	Position in club	Sentences
Ali Khamis	Player	1-year ban from football activities
Daudi Kajembe	Assistant coach	Life ban from football activities
Kelvin Odhiambo	Player	1-year ban from football activities
Mohammed Kheri	Technical director	1-year ban from football activities
Rama Izungu	Player	1-year ban from football activities
Sparki Youth	Club	6 point deduction
Sparki Youth	Club	Medical bills directed to Martin Wekesa to be covered by club's budget
Sparki Youth	Club	All remaining home fixtures to be played at the Mbaraki Stadium

Mohammed Kheri had since spoken out on his innocence in the assault, saying he tried to shield the referee and even gave him first aid and called for a car to rush him to hospital. No formal appeal, however, has been submitted to the FKF so far.

== League tables and results ==
=== Zone A ===
Pos	Team	Pld	W	D	L	GF	GA	GD	Pts	Qualification or relegation
1	Bandari (C, P)	37	24	10	3	62	18	+44	82	Promotion to 2013 Kenyan Premier League
2	Bidco United	37	19	14	4	49	27	+22	71	
3	Admiral	37	19	12	6	68	46	+22	69	
4	Mahakama	37	19	11	7	52	23	+29	68	
5	Administration Police	37	18	9	10	56	34	+22	63	
6	Ligi Ndogo	37	15	15	7	47	28	+19	60	
7	Kariobangi Sharks	37	16	9	12	51	42	+9	57	
8	Nairobi Stima	37	13	14	10	46	39	+7	53	
9	MOYAS	37	14	9	14	41	37	+4	51	
10	Kenya Revenue Authority	37	13	11	13	35	35	0	50	
11	Congo JMJ United	37	13	11	13	45	47	−2	50	
12	Coast United	37	12	9	16	41	52	−11	44 (Note: Coast United had 1 point deducted from their tally for willingly deciding not to turn up for their match against Sparki Youth on 1 May.)	
13	Green Berets	37	11	9	17	44	49	−5	42	
14	Kibera Celtic	37	9	12	16	29	51	−22	39	
15	Magongo Rangers	37	9	9	19	33	53	−20	36	
16	Sparki Youth (R)	37	11	7	19	39	51	−12	33 (Note: Sparki Youth had 1 point deducted from their tally for willingly deciding not to turn up for their match against Coast United on 1 May and 6 points deducted from their tally for involvement in an assault on the referee of their match against Admiral on 22 September.)	Relegation to 2013 Kenyan Provincial League
17	KSL Thola Glass (R)	37	8	8	21	30	60	−30	32	Relegation to 2013 Kenyan Provincial League
18	Gatundu Stars (R)	37	8	7	22	34	64	−30	31	Relegation to 2013 Kenyan Provincial League
19	Iron Strikers (R)	37	7	10	20	43	74	−31	31	Relegation to 2013 Kenyan Provincial League
20	Mathare Youth (E)	19	3	4	12	11	26	−15	13	Pulled out of league (Note: Mathare Youth disbanded and therefore pulled out of the league, after which the Football Kenya Federation decided to nullify all their second round results and cancel their upcoming fixtures. As a result, the FKF ruled that there were 19 teams left in the league, therefore the 16th-placed team would also be relegated.)

Updated to match(es) played on 18 November 2012. Source: FKF Division One, Zone A
Rules for classification: 1) points; 2) goal difference; 3) number of goals scored.
(C) Champions; (E) Eliminated; (P) Promoted; (R) Relegated
Notes:

Home \ Away	APO	ADM	BND	BCU	COU	WHU	GAT	GRB	IST	KBS	KIB	KRA	KSL	LGI	MCR	MAH	MAY	MYS	NST	SPY
Administration Police		2–1	0–1	0–0	1–1	2–2	2–0	2–1	3–1	3–0	4–0	3–0	2–1	2–2	2–0	0–2	2–0	0–1	1–0	2–1
Admiral	2–2		1–1	1–2	3–4	2–2	2–0	6–2	4–3	4–1	2–0 (Note: Admiral were handed a walkover with 3 points and 2 goals after Kibera Celtic failed to turn up for the match.)	0–0	4–0	0–0	2–1	2–0	– (Note: Mathare Youth disbanded and therefore pulled out of the tournament, after which the Football Kenya Federation decided to scrap all their second round results and cancel their upcoming fixtures.)	2–1	2–2	1–0 (Note: Sparki Youth were deducted 6 points from their tally for involvement in an assault on the referee during the match and causing its abandonment in the 88th minute. Admiral were awarded a win for their 63rd minute goal.)
Bandari	1–0	0–0		0–0	2–1	2–0	2–0	2–1	6–0	2–0	3–0	2–1	6–1	1–0	2–1	0–0	1–1	2–0	3–0	3–1
Bidco United	2–0	0–0	1–0		0–0	2–0	3–2	3–2	3–2	2–1	3–0	1–2	2–0	0–0	3–0	1–1	–	1–0	1–0	3–1
Coast United	1–1	1–2	1–2	1–1		1–1	2–1	0–2	3–1	2–0	1–0	0–2	2–0	1–0	2–1	1–0	3–1	0–3	0–2	0–0 (Note: Coast United and Sparki Youth were both deducted 1 point from their tally and handed losses for willingly deciding not to turn up for their match.)
FC West Ham United	2–5	1–2	3–3	1–0	2–3		3–0	0–2	1–1	2–2	2–0	1–0	4–2	1–2	0–0	0–0	2–0 (Note: Congo JMJ United were awarded all 3 points and 2 goals for their match against Mathare Youth after the FKF had proven that the latter had caused the match's abandonment.)	1–0	1–1	2–0
Gatundu Stars	0–5	1–1	1–0	0–1	1–1	0–1		2–0	1–1	1–2	0–0	1–2	1–1	0–3	3–1	0–1	0–1	2–4	2–1	1–2
Green Berets	0–1	0–0	0–0	1–1	3–1	1–3	1–2		5–1	0–0	2–0	0–0	1–0	0–4	4–0	2–1	0–1	1–1	0–0	2–0
Iron Strikers	2–4	3–4	1–3	1–2	0–0	0–1	1–2	2–4		1–1	2–1	2–1	1–0	2–3	1–1	1–3	2–0	0–2	1–3	1–0
Kariobangi Sharks	2–0	5–1	0–1	1–0	2–1	3–0	3–1	1–1	2–2		2–1	0–1	4–0	1–0	2–0	2–2	0–0	0–1	1–1	2–0
Kibera Celtic	0–0	1–0	0–0	1–1	4–1	0–1	1–2	1–0	2–2	0–2		2–1	1–1	2–1	1–1	1–0	1–0	0–0	1–0	2–0
Kenya Revenue Authority	0–1	1–2	0–1	4–1	1–0	1–1	2–2	1–2	0–1	0–1	1–1		2–1	0–0	1–1	0–2	1–0	1–1	1–1	2–1
KSL Thola Glass	1–0	2–2	0–2	1–2	0–0	1–0	1–1	1–0	0–2	1–0	0–1	1–0		0–1	3–0	0–2	1–1	1–2	0–1	1–3
Ligi Ndogo	2–0	2–3	0–2	0–0	2–1	2–0	1–0	3–0	0–0	3–1	1–1	0–0	2–2		0–1	0–0	–	2–0	1–1	2–0
Modern Coast Rangers	0–0	0–1	1–3	0–0	3–1	0–1	5–1	2–1	1–0	1–1	2–0	1–2	1–2	1–1		0–2	1–0	3–1	1–3	1–0
Mahakama	0–0	2–0	0–0	2–2	3–1	2–0	5–2	1–0	4–0	2–0	3–1	0–1	2–0	1–2	0–0		1–1	4–0	0–0	3–0
Mathare Youth	–	1–2	0–1	0–2	2–1	–	–	–	–	2–3	0–0	–	0–1	1–1	–	0–1		1–0	0–2	1–2
MOYAS	2–1	2–3	1–1	1–1	1–0	1–0	0–1	2–1	1–1	1–0	6–0	0–1	1–1	0–0	2–0	0–1	–		0–1	1–1
Nairobi Stima	2–3	0–2	1–0	1–1	0–2	3–2	1–0	2–2	2–0	1–1	1–1	1–1	1–2	1–2	4–1	0–0	2–0	2–1		2–0
Sparki Youth	1–0	1–1	0–2	0–1	4–1	1–1	1–0	2–0	1–1	1–2	3–2	0–1	3–1	2–2	1–0	4–0	–	0–1	2–2	

Updated to match(es) played on 18 November 2012. Source: FKF Division One, Zone A
Legend: Blue = home team win; Yellow = draw; Red = away team win.

=== Zone B ===
Pos	Team	Pld	W	D	L	GF	GA	GD	Pts	Qualification or relegation
1	Kakamega Homeboyz (C, P)	38	27	10	1	70	16	+54	91	Promotion to 2013 Kenyan Premier League
2	Nzoia United	38	27	4	7	74	29	+45	85	
3	Agrochemical	38	27	4	7	54	21	+33	85	
4	Nakuru AllStars	38	26	6	6	76	23	+53	84	
5	Finlays Horticulture	38	24	9	5	62	16	+46	81	
6	West Kenya Sugar	38	21	6	11	65	36	+29	69	
7	SOIN Fluorspar	38	19	10	9	59	39	+20	67	
8	Zoo Kericho	38	19	5	14	44	39	+5	62	
9	Longonot Horticulture	38	17	4	17	40	46	−6	55	
10	G.F.C. 105	38	15	8	15	55	53	+2	53	
11	Rush	38	14	6	18	51	48	+3	48	
12	Kisumu Municipal	38	12	10	16	32	42	−10	46	
13	Timsales	38	11	12	15	49	58	−9	45	
14	Shabana Kisii	38	13	5	20	32	49	−17	44	
15	Utawala	38	11	8	19	42	51	−9	41	
16	Comply	38	9	8	21	40	63	−23	35	
17	Karungu (R)	38	8	8	22	36	77	−41	32	Relegation to 2013 Kenyan Provincial League
18	Outgrowers (R)	38	9	3	26	36	75	−39	30	Relegation to 2013 Kenyan Provincial League
19	Yanga (R)	38	3	5	30	18	85	−67	14	Relegation to 2013 Kenyan Provincial League
20	H.B.C. Mlimani (R)	38	1	3	34	15	84	−69	6	Relegation to 2013 Kenyan Provincial League

Updated to match(es) played on 18 November 2012. Source: FKF Division One, Zone B
Rules for classification: 1) points; 2) goal difference; 3) number of goals scored.
(C) Champions; (P) Promoted; (R) Relegated

Home \ Away	AGC	CMP	FLH	GFC	HBC	KHB	KAR	KMN	LOH	NAS	NZU	BUS	VHG	SHB	SOIN	TIM	UTW	WKS	YNG	ZOO
Agrochemical		1–0	0–1	1–0	2–0 (Note: Agrochemical were handed a walkover with 3 points and 2 goals after HBC Mlimani failed to turn up for the match.)	0–0	2–0	0–0	1–0	1–0	2–1	2–1	2–1	2–0	1–0	0–0	2–0	2–1	2–0	1–0
Comply	0–2		1–2	1–3	3–1	0–2	2–0	0–1	0–0	0–1	1–5	5–3	1–2	2–0	3–2	1–4	1–1	0–2	1–1	0–0
Finlays Horticulture	1–0	4–0		0–0	4–0	0–1	6–0	1–0	3–0	0–0	1–0	3–1	3–0	2–0	0–1	0–0	2–0	2–0	3–0	1–1
G.F.C. 105	1–3	0–1	0–2		2–0	0–0	3–1	0–1	3–3	3–2	0–2	3–1	4–2	2–0	1–1	3–1	2–0	3–1	2–0	2–0
H.B.C. Mlimani	1–2	0–2	0–2 (Note: Finlays Horticulture were handed a walkover with 3 points and 2 goals after HBC Mlimani failed to turn up for the match.)	0–2 (Note: GFC 105 were handed a walkover with 3 points and 2 goals after HBC Mlimani failed to turn up for the match.)		0–2	0–1	1–1	0–2	0–2 (Note: Nakuru AllStars were handed a walkover with 3 points and 2 goals after HBC Mlimani failed to turn up for the match.)	1–2	1–3	1–1	1–2	1–3	2–2	0–2 (Note: Utawala were handed a walkover with 3 points and 2 goals after HBC Mlimani failed to turn up for the match.)	1–3	2–0 (Note: HBC Mlimani were handed a walkover with 3 points and 2 goals after Yanga failed to turn up for the match.)	0–2 (Note: Zoo Kericho were handed a walkover with 3 points and 2 goals after HBC Mlimani failed to turn up for the match.)
Kakamega Homeboyz	1–0	1–1	1–1	5–0	2–0		5–2	2–1	1–0	1–1	2–0	2–1	1–0	2–0	1–0	5–0	3–0	2–0	2–0	2–1
Karungu	0–4	2–2	1–1	1–1	4–1	0–2		1–0	0–1	1–1	0–2	3–0	3–2	0–0	1–1	0–4	1–2	1–1	2–0	2–0
Kisumu Municipal	1–0	0–0	1–0	2–2	2–0	0–2	3–0		2–0	0–1	1–1	2–0	2–1	1–0	0–0	0–0	1–1	2–3	2–0	0–4
Longonot Horticulture	2–1	1–0	0–2	0–0	2–1	0–0	0–3	3–2		0–1	1–0	2–0	2–0 (Note: Longonot Horticulture were handed a walkover with 3 points and 2 goals after Rush failed to turn up for the match.)	2–0 (Note: Longonot Horticulture were handed a walkover with 3 points and 2 goals after Shabana Kisii failed to turn up for the match.)	2–5	3–1	2–0	1–2	2–0	0–1
Nakuru AllStars	1–2	2–1	1–2	4–0	9–0	1–0	2–0	1–1	3–0		3–0	4–0	2–0 (Note: Nakuru AllStars were handed a walkover with 3 points and 2 goals after Rush failed to turn up for the match.)	2–0	0–1	2–0	3–0	2–1	2–0	4–1
Nzoia United	1–1	2–0	1–0	3–1	2–0	0–0	2–0 (Note: Nzoia United were handed a walkover with 3 points and 2 goals after Karungu failed to turn up for the match.)	2–0	3–0	0–1		6–1	1–0	2–0	2–1	2–1	2–0	0–1	2–0	2–1
Busia United Stars	0–1	1–1	0–1	1–3	2–0	0–1	3–1	3–0	2–1	0–1	1–3		0–1	2–0	2–2	1–1	2–0	0–3	2–0	2–0
Vihiga Stars	1–2	1–0	0–0	4–1	1–0 (Note: The match was called off at half-time because HBC Mlimani had not paid the referee's fee and Rush were awarded all 3 points for the match and a goal which they had scored prior to the game's abandonment.)	1–2	6–0	2–0	3–0	2–1	1–2	3–0		1–0	2–0	5–1	0–0	0–2	2–0	2–3
Shabana	1–3	2–1	1–1	1–0	2–0	1–1	2–1	2–1	2–0	0–2	1–2	1–0	1–1		1–2	2–1	2–1	1–1	3–0	1–0
SOIN Fluorspar	2–1	3–2	3–2	1–0	2–0 (Note: SOIN Fluorspar were handed a walkover with 3 points and 2 goals after HBC Mlimani failed to turn up for the match.)	1–2	4–0	2–0	1–0	3–3	1–1	3–1	2–0 (Note: SOIN Fluorspar were handed a walkover with 3 points and 2 goals after Rush failed to turn up for the match.)	2–0 (Note: SOIN Fluorspar were handed a walkover with 3 points and 2 goals after Shabana Kisii failed to turn up for the match.)		2–0	1–1	0–3	2–0	0–0
Timsales	0–2	3–2	1–1	2–1	2–0	0–2	2–0	1–0	1–2	1–1	1–3	2–0	2–2	2–0	1–1		3–1	2–2	0–0	1–0
Utawala	1–2	0–1	0–1	1–0	2–0	0–0	2–2	2–0	0–1	2–5	3–5	2–0	3–1	2–0	0–0	2–1		1–1	7–0	0–1
West Kenya Sugar	0–1	2–0	0–2	1–1	2–0	3–3	2–0	3–0	0–1	0–1	1–2	7–0	2–0	2–0	2–1	3–2	1–0		2–0	2–0
Yanga	1–3	2–4	0–3	2–5	2–0	0–2	2–2	1–2	0–4	0–3	0–5	2–0	2–0 (Note: Yanga were handed a walkover with 3 points and 2 goals after Rush failed to turn up for the match.)	0–0	1–2	2–2	0–2	0–2		0–1
Zoo Kericho	1–0	3–0	1–2	2–0	1–0	1–6	2–0	0–0	2–0	0–1	0–3	2–0	0–0	2–1	2–1	3–1	2–1	2–1	2–0	

Updated to match(es) played on 18 November 2012. Source: FKF Division One, Zone B
Legend: Blue = home team win; Yellow = draw; Red = away team win.

== Top scorers ==
Zone A

Rank	Player	Club	Goals
1	(Liberia) Roosevelt Blaty	Admiral	32
2	(Kenya) Michael Khamati	Administration Police	28
3	(Kenya) Timothy Otieno	Congo JMJ United	21
4	(Kenya) Vincent Okoth	Ligi Ndogo	13
5	(Kenya) Shabaan Kenga	Bandari	12
6	(Kenya) Eric Mmatsi	Mahakama	11
7	(Kenya) Ambrose Kamau	Mahakama	10
8	(Kenya) Kevince Ochieng	KSL Thola Glass	9
8	(Kenya) John Njoroge	Ligi Ndogo	9
8	(Kenya) Charles Pilipili	Mahakama	9
8	(Kenya) Tobias Baraza	Sparki Youth	9
8	(Nigeria) Lucky Eme	Sparki Youth	9

Last updated: 18 November 2012

Zone B

Rank	Player	Club	Goals
1	(Kenya) Valen Semi Mahero	Nzoia United	26
2	(Kenya) Benlee Juma	Finlays Horticulture	18
3	(Kenya) Dennis Mukaisi	Kakamega Homeboyz	17
4	(Kenya) Sebastian Muchera	Nakuru AllStars	16
4	(Kenya) Oliver Omondi	SOIN Fluorspar	16
6	(Kenya) John Mwita	Agrochemical	15
6	(Kenya) Stephen Wakhanya	West Kenya Sugar	15
8	(Kenya) Kennedy Mathiko	Utawala	14
9	(Kenya) Brian Mandela	Nakuru AllStars	11
9	(Kenya) Vincent Juma	Nzoia United	11
9	(Kenya) Kenneth Rono	SOIN Fluorspar	11

Last updated: 18 November 2012
