= 2013 FKF Division One =

FKF Division One
- Season: 2013
- Promoted: Kenya Revenue Authority; Top Fry AllStars
- Note: Walkovers counted in matches played but not counted in goals scored.

Zone A - Group 1
- Champions: Kenya Revenue Authority
- Promoted: FC Talanta; Bidco United; Ligi Ndogo; Nairobi Stima
- Relegated: Murang'a United (suspended)
- Matches: 132
- Goals: 324 (2.45 per match)
- Top goalscorer: Duncan Owiti (10 goals)
- Biggest home win: Nairobi Stima 10–0 Brighter Stars (24 March 2013)
- Biggest away win: Kambakia Christian Centre 0–5 Talanta (24 March 2013); Sparki Youth 0–5 Bidco United (5 May 2013)
- Highest scoring: Nairobi Stima 10–0 Brighter Stars (24 March 2013)
- All statistics correct as of 10 November 2013.

Zone A - Group 2
- Champions: Posta Rangers
- Promoted: Nakumatt; Modern Coast Rangers; Kariobangi Sharks; Administration Police
- Matches: 132
- Goals: 321 (2.43 per match)
- Top goalscorer: Peter Nzuki (12 goals)
- Biggest home win: Posta Rangers 8–0 FC West Ham United (25 August 2013)
- Biggest away win: Mumbi Nationale 0–6 Posta Rangers (12 October 2013)
- Highest scoring: Admiral 4–3 Mumbi Nationale (23 June 2013)
- All statistics correct as of 16 November 2013.

Zone B - Group 1
- Champions: Top Fry AllStars
- Promoted: West Kenya Sugar; Nzoia United; G.F.C. 105; Zoo Kericho
- Matches: 128
- Goals: 316 (2.47 per match)
- Top goalscorer: Nelson Simwa (14 goals)
- Biggest home win: Mumcop 7–0 Suam Orchards (22 September 2013)
- Biggest away win: Suam Orchards 0–6 West Kenya Sugar (26 October 2013)
- Highest scoring: Mumcop 7–0 Suam Orchards (22 September 2013)
- All statistics correct as of 3 November 2013.

Zone B - Group 2
- Champions: Oserian
- Promoted: Finlays Horticulture; Hotsprings; St. Joseph; Agrochemical
- Matches: 129
- Goals: 300 (2.33 per match)
- Top goalscorer: Musa Ochieng; Martin Oliech (11 goals)
- Biggest home win: Oserian 5–0 Utawala (18 May 2013); St. Joseph 5–0 Vihiga Stars (7 September 2013)
- Biggest away win: Field Negroes 1–5 Finlays Horticulture (12 May 2013)
- Highest scoring: Utawala 2–5 Hotsprings (7 April 2013)
- All statistics correct as of 2 November 2013.

The 2013 FKF Division One was the second season of FKF Division One and the Golden Jubilee second division season since it began in 1963. It began on 23 March and concluded on 21 December.

On 12 April, Murang'a United were suspended from participating in the league any further for the rest of the 2013 season and relegated to the Provincial League for missing three consecutive league games, against Brighter Stars, Maweni City and Kenya Revenue Authority. They were only allowed to participate in the Provincial League from the beginning of the 2014 season, and would not be replaced by any other team during the course of the season. As a result, all their results were nullified.

On 25 April, the Football Kenya Federation initially decided to slash the league to 20 teams for the 2014 season. For that to happen, it was decided that the league will consist of top 5 teams in each zone (except the two teams that win the promotion play-offs) in addition to the two relegated Premier League teams. The remaining 28 teams will be relegated to FKF Division Two, which will begin next season, along with the 8 teams promoted from the Provincial League. However, due to the creation of the Kenyan National Super League on 10 July, it was decided that top 5 teams in each zone (except the two teams that win the promotion play-offs) would be promoted to the new league along with the two relegated Premier League teams, while the remaining 28 teams along with 12 teams promoted from the Provincial League would form the new FKF Division One, which is to be the third-tier league from the beginning of the 2014 season.

== Changes from last season ==
For this season, all Division One teams endorsed a decision to split both Zone A and Zone B into two groups of 12 teams each, increasing the total number of teams in the league to 48. It was decided that the first group from Zone A comprise teams from the Nairobi, Aberdares and Mount Kenya regions while the second group comprise teams from the Eastern, North and South Coast regions. The first group from Zone B is to comprise teams from the South Nyanza, Central and South Rift regions while the second group comprise teams from the North Nyanza, North Rift and Western regions. In the league phase, teams are to play each other only one and winners from each of the four groups will play the winners from the other group in their zone in a two-legged play-off tie to determine who gains promotion to the Kenyan Premier League for the following season.

Outgrowers, who were to be relegated after finishing in 18th place in Zone B the previous season, were readmitted for reasons unknown.

=== From Division One ===
Eliminated from football league system

- Mathare Youth (disbanded)

Promoted to Premier League

- Bandari
- Kakamega Homeboyz

Relegated to Provincial League

- Gatundu Stars
- H.B.C. Mlimani
- Iron Strikers
- Karungu
- KSL Thola Glass
- Yanga

=== To Division One ===
Relegated from Premier League

- Oserian
- Rangers

Promoted from Provincial League

- Brighter Stars
- Hotsprings FC
- Jericho AllStars
- Kambakia Christian Centre
- Kisero
- Kisumu Youth Olympic Centre
- Kolongolo
- Maweni City
- Mount Kenya United
- Mumcop
- Murang'a United
- Nakumatt
- Raiders
- St. Joseph
- Suam Orchards
- Tala

Introduced to football league system

- FC Talanta

=== Team name changes ===
- Congo JMJ United to FC West Ham United
- Kisumu Youth Olympic Centre to Field Negroes
- Maweni City to Alaskan
- Nakuru AllStars to Top Fry AllStars
- Outgrowers to Busia United Stars
- Raiders to Gusii Raiders
- Rangers to Posta Rangers
- Rush to Kakamega Stars to Vihiga Stars
- Tala to Mumbi Nationale

== Teams ==
=== Stadia and locations ===
==== Zone A ====
Zone A clubs are from the Nairobi, Central, Eastern and Coast provinces.

===== Group 1 =====
Club	Home stadium	Town / City
Bidco United	Del Monte Grounds	Thika
Brighter Stars	Brighter Grounds	Lamu
Coast United	Tudor Day	Mombasa
Kambakia Christian Centre	Kinoru Stadium	Meru
Kenya Revenue Authority	Public Service Grounds	Nairobi
Kibera Celtic	Woodley Grounds	Nairobi
Ligi Ndogo	Ligi Ndogo Grounds	Nairobi
Mahakama	Nairobi City Stadium	Nairobi
Maweni City	Malindi Stadium	Maweni
Murang'a United	Ihora Stadium	Murang'a
Nairobi Stima	Nairobi City Stadium	Nairobi
Sparki Youth	RG Ngala	Nairobi
Talanta	Ruaraka Grounds	Nairobi

===== Group 2 =====
Club	Home stadium	Town / City
Administration Police	APTC Ground	Nairobi
Admiral	RG Ngala	Mombasa
Green Berets	PSTC Ruiru	Ruiru
Jericho AllStars	Jericho Toyoyo	Nairobi
Kariobangi Sharks	Nairobi City Stadium	Nairobi
Modern Coast Rangers	Refinery Grounds	Mombasa
Mount Kenya United	Kinunga Stadium	Unknown
Moyas	Langata Prison Ground	Nairobi
Mumbi Nationale	Portland Ground	Unknown
Nakumatt	Sameer Ground	Nairobi
Posta Rangers	Hope Centre	Nairobi
FC West Ham United	Mombasa Municipal Stadium	Mombasa

==== Zone B ====
Zone B teams are from the Western, Nyanza and Rift Valley provinces.

===== Group 1 =====
Club	Home stadium	Town / City
Comply	Afraha Stadium	Nakuru
G.F.C. 105	The Discipleship Grounds	Eldoret
Kisero	Unknown stadium	Unknown
Kolongolo	Bukhungu Stadium	Kakamega
Mumcop	Bukhungu Stadium	Kakamega
Nzoia United	Sudi Stadium	Bungoma
Shabana	Gusii Stadium	Kisii
Swan Orchards	Unknown stadium	Unknown
Timsales	Unknown stadium	Elburgon
Top Fry AllStars	Afraha Stadium	Nakuru
West Kenya Sugar	Bukhungu Stadium	Kakamega
Zoo Kericho	Green Stadium	Kericho

===== Group 2 =====
Club	Home stadium	Town / City
Agrochemical	Muhoroni Stadium	Muhoroni
Busia United Stars	Unknown stadium	Busia
Field Negroes	Unknown stadium	Kisumu
Finlays Horticulture	Kingfisher Grounds	Naivasha
Gusii Raiders	Unknown stadium	Kisii
Hotsprings	Kipchoge Keino Stadium	Eldoret
Kisumu Municipal	Moi Stadium	Kisumu
Longonot Horticulture	Kingfisher Grounds	Naivasha
Oserian	Naivasha Stadium	Naivasha
St. Joseph	Unknown stadium	Nakuru
Utawala	Afraha Stadium	Nakuru
Vihiga Stars	Unknown stadium	Vihiga

=== Managerial changes ===
As of 19:24, 5 May 2013 (UTC+3).

Team	Outgoing manager	Manner of departure	Date of vacancy	Incoming manager	Date of appointment	Position in table
Agrochemical	(Kenya) Leonard Saleh	Sacked	November 2012	(Kenya) James Omondi	21 January 2013	End of 2012 season
FC Talanta	(England) Jonathan Coles	Demoted	14 March 2013	(Kenya) Michael Nam	14 March 2013	End of 2012 season
Kolongolo	Unknown			(Netherlands) Jan Koops	3 March 2013	End of 2012 season
Kolongolo	(Netherlands) Jan Koops	Resigned	14 April 2013	(Kenya) Cox Imelenyi	16 April 2013	9th
Mahakama	(Kenya) Ezekiel Akwana	End of contract	31 January 2013	(Kenya) Zedekiah Otieno	19 March 2013	End of 2012 season
Rangers	(Kenya) James Nandwa	Sacked	November 2012	(Kenya) Leonard Saleh	21 December 2012	End of 2012 season

== League tables and results ==
=== Zone A ===
==== Group 1 ====
Pos	Team	Pld	W	D	L	GF	GA	GD	Pts	Qualification or relegation
1	Kenya Revenue Authority (O, P, Q)	22	15	5	2	36	8	+28	50	Qualification for promotion play-offs
2	FC Talanta (P)	22	12	8	2	42	17	+25	44	Promotion to 2014 Kenyan National Super League
3	Bidco United (P)	22	12	6	4	41	19	+22	42	Promotion to 2014 Kenyan National Super League
4	Ligi Ndogo (P)	22	12	5	5	35	22	+13	41	Promotion to 2014 Kenyan National Super League
5	Nairobi Stima (P)	22	9	11	2	32	14	+18	38	Promotion to 2014 Kenyan National Super League
6	Mahakama	22	10	7	5	33	14	+19	37	
7	Coast United	22	7	5	10	19	26	−7	26	
8	Kambakia Christian Centre	22	6	2	14	21	37	−16	20	
9	Alaskan	22	6	2	14	24	41	−17	20	
10	Sparki Youth	22	5	4	13	16	33	−17	19	
11	Kibera Celtic	22	4	6	12	15	28	−13	18	
12	Brighter Stars	22	2	3	17	10	65	−55	9	
13	Murang'a United (E)	0	0	0	0	0	0	0	0	Suspended from league (Note: Murang'a United were suspended from the league for the rest of the season and had all their results nullified for missing three consecutive league games.)

Updated to match(es) played on 10 November 2013. Source: FKF Division One, Zone A, Group 1
Rules for classification: 1) points; 2) goal difference; 3) number of goals scored.
(E) Eliminated; (O) Play-off winners; (P) Promoted; (Q) Qualified for the phase indicated
Notes:

Home \ Away	ALS	BCU	BST	COU	FCT	KCC	KRA	KIB	LGI	MAH	MRU	NST	SPY
Alaskan		5–1	3–0	2–3	0–2	3–1	0–1	2–0	1–1	0–2	2–0 (Note: Murang'a United were suspended from the league for the rest of the season and had all their results nullified for missing three consecutive league games.)	1–1	1–0
Bidco United	2–0		8–0	2–0	3–2	3–0	0–0	3–1	2–2	1–0		1–1	3–0
Brighter Stars	1–3	1–2		1–0	2–2	2–1	0–4	0–0	0–3	0–1	2–0	0–2	2–2
Coast United	2–0	0–1	2–0		0–0	1–1	0–2	2–0	3–2	2–2		0–1	1–0
FC Talanta	2–0	4–1	5–0	2–0		2–0	0–0	2–0	3–3	2–1		0–0	3–0
Kambakia C.C.	2–1	0–0	2–0	2–1	0–5		1–2	1–1	1–0	0–1		3–1	1–3
Kenya Revenue Authority	8–0	0–0	2–0	3–0	1–1	2–1		2–0	2–3	1–0	2–0	1–1	1–0
Kibera Celtic	3–0	0–2	2–0	0–0	0–2	0–3	0–1		1–2	0–0		0–0	3–2
Ligi Ndogo	2–0	2–1	3–1	3–0	1–2	1–0	0–1	2–1		1–0		1–1	1–0
Mahakama	3–1	0–0	7–0	2–0	4–0	2–0	0–1	1–1	1–1			1–1	2–0
Murang'a United				1–1									
Nairobi Stima	2–1	1–0	10–0	1–1	0–0	1–0	0–1	3–0	1–0	2–2			2–1
Sparki Youth	2–0	0–5		0–0	1–1	2–5	1–0	1–0	0–1	0–1		0–0	

Updated to match(es) played on 3 November 2013. Source: FKF Division One, Zone A, Group 1
Legend: Blue = home team win; Yellow = draw; Red = away team win.

==== Group 2 ====
Pos	Team	Pld	W	D	L	GF	GA	GD	Pts	Qualification or relegation
1	Posta Rangers (Q)	22	16	5	1	52	9	+43	53	Qualification for promotion play-offs
2	Nakumatt (P)	22	14	3	5	32	19	+13	45	Promotion to 2014 Kenyan National Super League
3	Modern Coast Rangers (P)	22	13	5	4	30	14	+16	44	Promotion to 2014 Kenyan National Super League
4	Kariobangi Sharks (P)	22	11	5	6	36	25	+11	38	Promotion to 2014 Kenyan National Super League
5	Administration Police (P)	22	11	4	7	30	21	+9	37	Promotion to 2014 Kenyan National Super League
6	Admiral	22	10	3	9	27	32	−5	33	
7	MOYAS	22	9	5	8	30	19	+11	32	
8	Green Berets	22	8	5	9	19	19	0	29	
9	FC West Ham United	22	4	4	14	18	44	−26	16	
10	Mumbi Nationale	22	4	4	14	17	45	−28	16	
11	Mount Kenya United	22	4	2	16	15	38	−23	14	
12	Jericho AllStars	22	2	7	13	15	36	−21	13	

Updated to match(es) played on 16 November 2013. Source: FKF Division One, Zone A, Group 2
Rules for classification: 1) points; 2) goal difference; 3) number of goals scored.
(P) Promoted; (Q) Qualified for the phase indicated

Home \ Away	APO	ADM	GRB	JAS	KBS	MCR	MKU	MYS	MBI	NKM	PRN	WHU
Administration Police		2–0	2–2	0–0	0–1	2–1	1–0	1–0	3–0	4–0	0–0	3–1
Admiral	2–0		0–2	2–0	0–2	0–2	3–1	1–0	4–3	0–0	0–2	2–0
Green Berets	0–1	2–0		1–0	2–0	0–0	2–0	0–1	2–2	1–3	0–1	0–2
Jericho AllStars	0–3	1–2	0–0		0–2	2–2	2–0	0–3	0–1	1–3	0–0	1–1
Kariobangi Sharks	4–2	2–2	1–0	1–1		2–1	0–1	1–2	3–0	2–0	2–2	2–0
Modern Coast Rangers	1–0	1–1	1–0	2–0	3–2		2–0	2–0	4–1	1–0	1–0	2–0
Mount Kenya United	0–1	1–2	1–2	2–3	1–2	0–0		0–4	1–3	1–2	0–2	2–0
MOYAS	3–2	4–0	0–0	3–1	2–2	0–0	0–2		1–1	0–1	0–0	5–1
Mumbi Nationale	0–0	1–4	2–0	1–0	0–3	0–2	0–1	0–1		0–4	0–6	1–1
Nakumatt	1–0	2–0	0–1	3–1	1–0	1–0	1–1	2–1	1–0		2–3	2–0
Posta Rangers	5–1	4–1	2–0	2–0	3–0	2–0	5–0	1–0	1–0	1–1		8–0
FC West Ham United	0–2	0–1	0–2	2–2	2–2	1–2	1–0	1–0	3–1	1–2	1–2	

Updated to match(es) played on 16 November 2013. Source: FKF Division One, Zone A, Group 2
Legend: Blue = home team win; Yellow = draw; Red = away team win.

=== Zone B ===
==== Group 1 ====
Pos	Team	Pld	W	D	L	GF	GA	GD	Pts	Qualification or relegation
1	Nakuru AllStars (O, P, Q)	22	16	5	1	35	7	+28	53	Qualification for promotion play-offs
2	West Kenya Sugar (P)	22	17	1	4	45	16	+29	52	Promotion to 2014 Kenyan National Super League
3	Nzoia United (P)	21	12	4	5	35	15	+20	40	Promotion to 2014 Kenyan National Super League
4	G.F.C. 105 (P)	22	12	2	8	32	25	+7	38	Promotion to 2014 Kenyan National Super League
5	Zoo Kericho (P)	21	10	5	6	28	14	+14	35	Promotion to 2014 Kenyan National Super League
6	Mumcop	22	9	4	9	34	33	+1	31	
7	Timsales	21	9	3	9	26	20	+6	30	
8	Kolongolo	22	6	7	9	17	29	−12	25	
9	Comply	21	6	4	11	18	28	−10	22	
10	Shabana	19	5	2	12	17	37	−20	17	
11	Suam Orchards	21	4	3	14	18	49	−31	15	
12	Kisero	22	1	2	19	11	43	−32	5	

Updated to match(es) played on 3 November 2013. Source: FKF Division One, Zone B, Group 1
Rules for classification: 1) points; 2) goal difference; 3) number of goals scored.
(O) Play-off winners; (P) Promoted; (Q) Qualified for the phase indicated

Home \ Away	CMP	GFC	KIS	KLO	MCP	NZU	SHB	SUO	TIM	NAS	WKS	ZOO
Comply		0–2	2–1	0–0	1–3	0–2	4–1		0–1	0–0	0–1	0–1
G.F.C. 105	1–2		3–1	2–0	2–1	0–2	3–1	2–0	2–1	1–0	1–0	1–1
Kisero	0–2	1–2			0–2	0–2	3–1	1–1	0–2	0–1	0–1	1–3
Kolongolo	0–0	3–0	0–0		1–1	1–5	2–0	2–1	1–1	1–1	1–0	0–1
Mumcop	4–2	1–0	3–2	0–3		0–5	2–0	7–0	1–1	1–2	1–2	2–1
Nzoia United	1–0	2–1	2–0		1–1			1–0	3–1	0–0	2–3	1–0
Shabana	0–2	1–0	2–0	2–0	1–1	1–4		1–1	1–3	0–1	0–2	0–3
Suam Orchards	1–2	0–3	2–0	4–0	1–2	0–4	3–2		2–1	1–1	0–6	0–0
Timsales	3–0	0–1	3–0	2–0	2–1	1–1		2–0		0–1	0–1	0–1
Nakuru AllStars	0–0	3–1	2–0	2–0	1–0	2–0	3–0	5–1	1–0		3–0	1–0
West Kenya Sugar	3–0	2–1	3–1	4–0	3–0		6–0	2–1	3–1	1–1		1–0
Zoo Kericho	1–1	3–3	2–0	3–0	2–0	1–0		4–0	0–1	1–1	0–1	

Updated to match(es) played on 3 November 2013. Source: FKF Division One, Zone B, Group 1
Legend: Blue = home team win; Yellow = draw; Red = away team win.

==== Group 2 ====
Pos	Team	Pld	W	D	L	GF	GA	GD	Pts	Qualification or relegation
1	Oserian (Q)	22	16	6	0	41	12	+29	54	Qualification for 2014 Kenyan Premier League promotion play-offs
2	Finlays Horticulture (P)	22	16	3	3	33	9	+24	51	Promotion to 2014 Kenyan National Super League
3	Hotsprings (P)	22	13	2	7	32	25	+7	41	Promotion to 2014 Kenyan National Super League
4	St. Joseph (P)	22	12	4	6	41	18	+23	40	Promotion to 2014 Kenyan National Super League
5	Agrochemical (P)	21	12	4	5	28	16	+12	40	Promotion to 2014 Kenyan National Super League
6	Busia United Stars	21	10	4	7	25	21	+4	34	
7	Longonot Horticulture	22	7	9	6	18	17	+1	30	
8	Field Negroes	22	8	3	11	28	35	−7	27	
9	Vihiga Stars	20	4	3	13	17	32	−15	15	
10	Gusii Raiders	21	4	2	15	15	34	−19	14	
11	Utawala	21	2	5	14	13	39	−26	11	
12	Kisumu Municipal	22	1	3	18	9	42	−33	6	

Updated to match(es) played on 2 November 2013. Source: FKF Division One, Zone B, Group 2
Rules for classification: 1) points; 2) goal difference; 3) number of goals scored.
(P) Promoted; (Q) Qualified for the phase indicated

Home \ Away	AGC	BUS	FNG	FLH	GUR	HSP	KMN	LOH	OSE	STJ	UTW	VHG
Agrochemical		2–0 (Note: Agrochemical were handed a walkover with 3 points and 2 goals after Busia United Stars failed to turn up for the match.)	1–1	2–1	2–1	1–2	2–0	2–0	0–0	1–0	2–0	
Busia United Stars	1–0		1–0		2–0	3–2	2–0	1–1	0–1	2–0	2–0	3–0
Field Negroes	0–2			1–5	2–0	1–0	3–1	2–1	1–3	0–3	1–1	4–2
Finlays Horticulture		1–0	1–0		2–0		2–1	2–1	0–0	1–2	3–0	1–0
Gusii Raiders	0–2	0–2	2–1	0–2		1–2	2–0	2–1	1–3	1–2		0–1
Hotsprings	2–1	2–0	2–0	1–1	2–0		2–0	1–0	1–1	0–3	2–0	2–1
Kisumu Municipal	0–2	1–1	0–2	0–2	0–3	1–2		0–2	0–2	1–1	2–0	0–2
Longonot Horticulture	1–1	0–0	2–1	0–0	0–0	1–0	2–1		0–0	1–0	0–1	1–1
Oserian	3–1	4–2	2–1	1–0	2–0	3–1	2–0	0–0		3–1	5–0	1–0
St. Joseph	1–1	4–0	1–2	0–1	3–1	3–0	2–0		1–1		1–0	5–0
Utawala	0–1	1–2	3–2	0–1	1–1	2–5	1–1	1–2	0–1	1–4		0–0
Vihiga Stars			1–2	0–2		0–1	3–0	0–1	2–3	0–3	1–1	

Updated to match(es) played on 2 November 2013. Source: FKF Division One, Zone B, Group 2
Legend: Blue = home team win; Yellow = draw; Red = away team win.

== Top scorers ==
=== Zone A ===
Group 1

Rank	Player	Club	Goals
1	(Kenya) Duncan Owiti	Mahakama	10
2	(Kenya) Mudhafar Swaleh	Alaskan	9
3	(Kenya) Patrick Muchiri	FC Talanta	8
3	(Kenya) Oscar Wamalwa	Bidco United	8
5	(Tanzania) George Hawle	Nairobi Stima	7
5	(Kenya) John Njoroge	Ligi Ndogo	7
5	(Kenya) Hussein Puzzo	Bidco United	7
8	(Kenya) Mohammed Ahmed	Kenya Revenue Authority	6
8	(Kenya) Anthony Karanja	FC Talanta	6
8	(Nigeria) Philip Mbaeme	Ligi Ndogo	6
8	(Kenya) Hassan Nasur	Kibera Celtic	6
8	(Kenya) Francis Ochola	Kambakia Christian Centre	6

Last updated: 10 November 2013

Group 2

Rank	Player	Club	Goals
1	(Kenya) Peter Nzuki	Nakumatt	12
2	(Kenya) Oscar Olwith	Posta Rangers	11
3	(Kenya) Nicodemus Asumwa	Green Berets	9
4	(Kenya) Kassim Mohammed	Modern Coast Rangers	8
4	(Kenya) Samuel Muringu	Kariobangi Sharks	8
4	(Kenya) Joseph Nyaga	Posta Rangers	8
4	(Kenya) Victor Ochieng	Posta Rangers	8
8	(Kenya) Michael Khamati	Administration Police	7
9	(Kenya) Sanusi Kola	Moyas	6
9	(Kenya) Edwin Mwaura	Posta Rangers	6
9	(Kenya) Ezekiel Wagongo	Moyas	6

Last updated: 16 November 2013

=== Zone B ===
Group 1

Rank	Player	Club	Goals
1	(Kenya) Nelson Simwa	West Kenya Sugar	14
2	(Kenya) Valen Semi Mahero	Nzoia United	10
3	(Kenya) Samuel Kizito	G.F.C. 105	8
4	(Kenya) Amos Kigadi	G.F.C. 105	7
5	(Kenya) Daniel Ochieng	West Kenya Sugar	6
6	(Kenya) Duke Abuya	G.F.C. 105	5
6	(Kenya) Philip Muchuma	Mumcop / Nzoia United	5
6	(Kenya) Dennis Osotch	West Kenya Sugar	5
9	(Kenya) Wilson Andati	Top Fry AllStars	4
9	(Kenya) Daniel Kamau	Top Fry AllStars	4
9	(Kenya) Aggrey Karamoja	Timsales	4
9	(Kenya) Bryan Mandela	West Kenya Sugar	4
9	(Kenya) Luke Namanda	Timsales / Nzoia United	4
9	(Kenya) Geoffrey Tietie	Nzoia United	4

Last updated: 3 November 2013

Group 2

Rank	Player	Club	Goals
1	(Kenya) Musa Ochieng	Busia United Stars	11
1	(Kenya) Martin Oliech	Oserian	11
3	(Kenya) Jackson Ndeda	Longonot Horticulture	9
4	(Kenya) Peter Chesoli	Oserian	8
5	(Kenya) Dennis Kalama	Finlays Horticulture	7
5	(Kenya) Edmund Murai	Oserian	7
5	(Kenya) Wray Odhiambo	Finlays Horticulture	7
8	(Kenya) Joseph Esinyen	St. Joseph	6
8	(Kenya) Juma Hamisi	St. Joseph	6
8	(Kenya) Oscar Oketch	Hotsprings	6

Last updated: 2 November 2013

== Promotion play-offs ==
The promotion play-offs were contested between the winners of each of the 2 groups in both zones, to determine the winners of the zones, who would be consequently promoted to the Premier League. The losers would still gain promotion to the National Super League.

=== Zone A ===
21 December 2013
15:35 UTC+3

Kenya Revenue Authority	2 – 2	Posta Rangers
Olwith 15'; Ajwang 26'	Report 1 Report 2	Tiego 60'; Hassan 75'
Penalties
Hassan (penalty scored); Kataka (penalty scored); Mukoi (penalty scored); Otieno (penalty scored); Macharia (penalty scored)	5 – 4	(penalty scored) Ochieng; (penalty scored) Ajwang; (penalty scored) Mbugi; (penalty scored) Mukaisi; (penalty missed) Opere

City Stadium, Nairobi

=== Zone B ===
21 December 2013
13:00 UTC+3

Top Fry AllStars	1 – 0	Oserian
Andati 31'	Report	Oguna (yellow card) 58'

City Stadium, Nairobi
