= 2013 FKF President's Cup =

GOtv Shield

Tournament details
- Country: Kenya
- Teams: 48

Final positions
- Champions: A.F.C. Leopards
- Runners-up: Gor Mahia
- Third place: Sofapaka
- Fourth place: Sony Sugar
- Confederation Cup: A.F.C. Leopards

Tournament statistics
- Matches played: 48
- Goals scored: 126 (2.63 per match)

The 2013 FKF President's Cup (known as the GOtv Shield for sponsorship reasons) is the 42nd season of Kenya's top domestic cup competition. It began on 20 July and ended on 17 November, with domestic broadcasting rights for the competition held by SuperSport.

After beating rivals and 2013 Kenyan Premier League champions Gor Mahia in the final, A.F.C. Leopards will represent Kenya in the preliminary round of the 2014 CAF Confederation Cup and will play Gor Mahia again at the 2014 Kenyan Super Cup.

== Teams ==
| Round | Clubs remaining | Clubs involved | Winners from previous round | New entries this round | Leagues entering at this round | Prize money |
|---|---|---|---|---|---|---|
| First round | 48 | 32 | none | 32 | FKF Division One; Kenyan Provincial League | none |
| Second round | 32 | 32 | 16 | 16 | Kenyan Premier League | none |
| Third round | 16 | 16 | 16 | none | none | none |
| Quarter-finals | 8 | 8 | 8 | none | none | none |
| Semi-finals | 4 | 4 | 4 | none | none | KSh.500,000/= (3rd place); KSh.250,000/= (4th place) |
| Final | 2 | 2 | 2 | none | none | KSh.1.5 million/= (1st place); KSh.750,000/= (2nd place) |

== Bracket ==
First round
Borabu Chiefs | 0
Shabana Kisii | 1
Nakumatt | 7
Mulembe | 2
Intercity | 4'
Ulinzi Warrior | 5
St. Joseph | 1
Zoo Kericho | 0
M.K. United | 0
Nzoia United | 2
MOYAS | 3
Ligi Ndogo | 0
K.N.H. | 1
W. Kenya Sugar | 6
Top Fry AllStars | 1
FC Talanta | 2
K.R.A. | 1 (4)
Agrochemical | 1 (5)
Wazito | 1
Comply | 0
Muhoroni Young | 0
Black Mamba | 1
Finlays H. | 5
Nairobi Stima | 4
Kisero | 1
Hotsprings FC | 2
K. Sharks | 2
G.F.C. 105 | 0
Gatundu Stars | 1
Bidco United | 4
Internationale | 1
Wazee Wa Kazi | 4

Second round
Gor Mahia | 6
Shabana Kisii | 0
Nakumatt | 0
Thika United | 1
Western Stima | 2
Ulinzi Warrior | 0
St. Joseph | 0
K. Homeboyz | 1
Mathare United | 3
Nzoia United | 0
MOYAS | 1
Ulinzi Stars | 3
Sony Sugar | 1
W. Kenya Sugar | 0
Tusker | 1
FC Talanta | 0
Sofapaka | 6
Agrochemical | 0
Wazito | 0
Nairobi City Stars | 1
Bandari | 2
Black Mamba | 0
Finlays H. | 2
K.C.B. | 1
Karuturi Sports | 2
Hotsprings FC | 0
K. Sharks | 2
Muhoroni Youth | 0
Chemelil Sugar | 3
Bidco United | 1
A.F.C. Leopards | 5
Wazee Wa Kazi | 0

Third round
Gor Mahia | 2
Thika United | 0
Western Stima | 0 (4)
K. Homeboyz | 0 (3)
Mathare United | 0 (8)
Ulinzi Stars | 0 (7)
Sony Sugar | 1
Tusker | 0
Sofapaka | 1
Nairobi City Stars | 0
Bandari | 0 (3)
Finlays H. | 0 (4)
Karuturi Sports | 1 (8)
K. Sharks | 1 (7)
Chemelil Sugar | 0
A.F.C. Leopards | 1

Quarter-finals
Gor Mahia | 2
Western Stima | 0
Mathare United | 0 (2)
Sony Sugar | 0 (4)
Sofapaka | 1
Finlays H. | 0
Karuturi Sports | 0
A.F.C. Leopards | 3

Semi-finals
Gor Mahia | 0 (4)
Sony Sugar | 0 (2)
Sofapaka | 0
A.F.C. Leopards | 2

Final
Gor Mahia | 0
A.F.C. Leopards | 1

== First round ==
First round ties were played from 20 July to 28 July. 32 teams from FKF Division One, the Kenyan Provincial League, the Kenyan County League and the Kenyan District League combined began their campaigns at this stage.

| 20 July 2013 | Kenyatta National Hospital | 1 − 6 | West Kenya Sugar |
| 13:00 UTC+3 | | Report |

| 20 July 2013 | Zoo Kericho | 0 − 1 | St. Joseph |
| 15:00 UTC+3 | | Report |

| 20 July 2013 | Nakumatt | 7 − 2 | Mulembe |
| 15:00 UTC+3 | | Report |

| 20 July 2013 | Ulinzi Warrior | 5 − 4 | Intercity |
| 15:00 UTC+3 | | Report |

| 21 July 2013 | Internationale | 1 − 3 | Wazee Wa Kazi |
| 13:00 UTC+3 | | Report |

| 21 July 2013 | Comply | 0 − 1 | Wazito |
| 15:00 UTC+3 | | Report |

| 21 July 2013 | Finlays Horticulture | 5 − 4 | Nairobi Stima |
| 15:00 UTC+3 | | Report |

| 21 July 2013 | FC Talanta | 2 − 1 | Top Fry AllStars | Kawangware, Nairobi |
| 15:00 UTC+3 | Muchiri 32'; Mandela (yellow card) 39'; Tera (yellow card) 53'; Kiplagat (yellow card) 69'; Lemayian 70'; Shikalo (yellow card) 77' | Report | (yellow card) 35'; Owino 72'; (yellow card) 82' | Stadium: Hope Centre; Attendance: 100; Referee: Raphael Nduati |

| 26 July 2013 | MOYAS | 3 − 0 | Ligi Ndogo | Shauri Moyo, Nairobi |
| 15:00 UTC+3 | Jackson 60'; Libesi 68'; Mwangi 89' | Report | | Stadium: City Stadium |

| 27 July 2013 | Gatundu Stars | 1 − 4 | Bidco United |
| 15:00 UTC+3 | Unidentified 30' | Report | Anthony Mbuthia 23', 40'; Chieta 35'; Wendo 80' |

| 27 July 2013 | Muhoroni Young | 0 − 1 | Black Mamba |
| 15:00 UTC+3 | | Report |

| 28 July 2013 | Kisero | 1 − 2 | Hotsprings FC |
| 13:00 UTC+3 | Unidentified | Report | Omondi 17', 70' |

| 28 July 2013 | Nzoia United | 2 − 0 | Mount Kenya United |
| 15:00 UTC+3 | | Report |

| 28 July 2013 | Agrochemical | 1 − 1 (5 – 4 p) | Kenya Revenue Authority |
| 15:00 UTC+3 | | Report |

| 28 July 2013 | Kariobangi Sharks | 2 − 0 | G.F.C. 105 |
| 15:00 UTC+3 | Kamura 35', 74' | Report |

| 28 July 2013 | Shabana Kisii | 1 − 0 | Borabu Chiefs |
| 15:00 UTC+3 | Atanga 59' | Report |

== Second round ==
The draw for the second round of the tournament was held on 7 August 2013 in central Nairobi.

| 10 August 2013 | A.F.C. Leopards | 5 − 0 | Wazee Wa Kazi | Shauri Moyo, Nairobi |
| 16:00 UTC+3 | M. Baraza 24'; Wanga 38'; Wafula 43'; Kadenge 60'; Opiyo 75' (yellow card) 80' | Report | Njau (yellow card) 26'; Asibwa (yellow card) 36'; Ahatange (yellow card) 64'; Omollo (yellow card) 82' | Stadium: City Stadium |

| 23 August 2013 | Mathare United | 3 – 0 | Nzoia United | Shauri Moyo, Nairobi |
| 15:00 UTC+3 | Mwangi (yellow card) 28'; Mumina 51'; Ouma 54'; Mwaura 69'; Nduru (yellow card) 83' | Report | | Stadium: City Stadium |

| 24 August 2013 | Sony Sugar | 1 – 0 | West Kenya Sugar | Awendo, Migori |
| 15:00 UTC+3 | Arita 43' | Report | | Stadium: Green Stadium |

| 24 August 2013 | Finlays Horticulture | 2 – 1 | Kenya Commercial Bank | Naivasha, Nakuru |
| 15:00 UTC+3 | Juma 25'; Mung'are 52' | Report | Alwanga 47' | Stadium: Kingfisher Grounds |

| 24 August 2013 | Chemelil Sugar | 3 – 1 | Bidco United | Chemelil, Kisumu |
| 15:00 UTC+3 | | Report | | Stadium: Chemelil Sports Complex |

| 24 August 2013 | St. Joseph | 0 – 1 | Kakamega Homeboyz | Nakuru, Nakuru |
| 15:00 UTC+3 | | Report | | Stadium: Afraha Stadium |

| 24 August 2013 | Western Stima | 2 – 0 | Ulinzi Warrior | Bukhungu, Kakamega |
| 15:00 UTC+3 | Ocholla 33'; Shimonyo 70' | Report | | Stadium: Bukhungu Stadium |

| 24 August 2013 | Tusker | 1 – 0 | FC Talanta | Ruaraka, Nairobi |
| 15:00 UTC+3 | Were 61' (pen.) | Report | Ngugi (yellow card) 44' (yellow-red card) 60' | Stadium: Ruaraka Stadium; Attendance: 100 |

| 25 August 2013 | Nakumatt | 0 – 1 | Thika United | Ruaraka, Nairobi |
| 13:00 UTC+3 | | Report | Mulbah 80' | Stadium: Ruaraka Stadium |

| 25 August 2013 | Wazito | 0 – 1 | Nairobi City Stars | Kawangware, Nairobi |
| 14:00 UTC+3 | | Report | | Stadium: Hope Centre |

| 25 August 2013 | Sofapaka | 6 – 0 | Agrochemical | Shauri Moyo, Nairobi |
| 14:00 UTC+3 | Kasolo ?', ?'; Esieche ?'; Agwanda ?'; Mugalia ?'; Asike ?' | Report | | Stadium: City Stadium |

| 25 August 2013 | Bandari | 2 – 0 | Black Mamba | Mombasa Island, Mombasa |
| 15:00 UTC+3 | Hamisi 32'; Okoth 60' | Report | | Stadium: Mbaraki Stadium |

| 25 August 2013 | Karuturi Sports | 2 – 0 | Hotsprings FC | Naivasha, Nakuru |
| 15:00 UTC+3 | Masiga ?'; Mwachiponi 70' | Report | | Stadium: Naivasha Stadium |

| 25 August 2013 | MOYAS | 1 – 3 | Ulinzi Stars | Ruaraka, Nairobi |
| 16:00 UTC+3 | Kola 90' (pen.) | Report | Ochomo 31'; Hassan ?'; Wamalwa ?' | Stadium: Ruaraka Stadium |

| 25 August 2013 | Kariobangi Sharks | 2 – 0 | Muhoroni Youth | Shauri Moyo, Nairobi |
| 16:00 UTC+3 | Tostao 3'; Kamura 17' | Report | | Stadium: City Stadium |

| 11 September 2013 | Gor Mahia | 6 – 0 | Shabana Kisii | Madaraka Estate, Nairobi |
| 15:00 UTC+3 | K. Omondi 34', 56' (pen.); Sserunkuma 40', 59'; Emuge (yellow card) 51'; Okumu 65'; Lavatsa 90+3' | Report | Mogire (yellow card) 31'; Machuka (yellow card) 47' (red card) 55' | Stadium: Nyayo National Stadium |

== Third round ==
The third round of the tournament will be played on the weekend of 21–22 September 2013.

Of the 16 teams that advanced from the second round, only Finlays Horticulture and Kariobangi Sharks are from Division One, while the rest are from the Premier League. No Provincial League side made it through the second round.

| 21 September 2013 | Mathare United | 0 – 0 (8 – 7 p) | Ulinzi Stars | Shauri Moyo, Nairobi |
| 10:00 UTC+3 | | Report | | Stadium: City Stadium |
| | Penalties |
| | Wendo (penalty scored); Monday (penalty scored); Nzomo (penalty scored); Okello (penalty scored); Mwaura (penalty scored); Wahome (penalty scored); Matano (penalty missed); E. Ochieng (penalty scored); Mboya (penalty scored) | | (penalty scored) Simiyu; (penalty scored) Shitote; (penalty scored) Wamalwa; (penalty scored) Munandi; (penalty scored) Waruru; (penalty scored) James Saruni; (penalty missed) Ochola; (penalty scored) Amuoka; (penalty missed) Mwamburi |

| 21 September 2013 | Sony Sugar | 1 – 0 | Tusker | Shauri Moyo, Nairobi |
| 12:30 UTC+3 | Onyango 79' | Report | | Stadium: City Stadium |

| 21 September 2013 | Western Stima | 0 – 0 (4 – 3 p) | Kakamega Homeboyz | Bukhungu, Kakamega |
| 14:00 UTC+3 | | Report | | Stadium: Bukhungu Stadium |

| 21 September 2013 | Bandari | 0 – 0 (3 – 4 p) | Finlays Horticulture | Mbaraki, Mombasa |
| 15:00 UTC+3 | | Report | | Stadium: Mbaraki Stadium |

| 21 September 2013 | Chemelil Sugar | 0 – 1 | A.F.C. Leopards | Nakuru, Nakuru |
| 15:05 UTC+3 | Agembe (yellow card) 26'; Ouma (yellow card) 32'; Oduor (yellow card) 90' | Report | Okwemba (yellow card) 31' (goal) 74'; Wagaluka (yellow card) 75' | Stadium: Afraha Stadium |

| 22 September 2013 | Sofapaka | 1 – 0 | Nairobi City Stars | Shauri Moyo, Nairobi |
| 12:00 UTC+3 | Mang'oli (yellow card) 48'; Mulumba (yellow card) 54'; Situma 89' | Report | Ongwae (yellow card) 51'; Museve (yellow card) 64'; Bageya (yellow card) 68' | Stadium: City Stadium |

| 22 September 2013 | Gor Mahia | 2 – 0 | Thika United | Shauri Moyo, Nairobi |
| 14:30 UTC+3 | Mosoti (yellow card) 47'; Oboya 50'; Sserunkuma 58' | Report | Meja (yellow card) 72' | Stadium: City Stadium |

| 22 September 2013 | Karuturi Sports | 1 – 1 (8 – 7 p) | Kariobangi Sharks | Naivasha, Nakuru |
| 15:00 UTC+3 | Mohammed 60' | Report | Oluwadare 78' | Stadium: Naivasha Stadium |

== Quarter-finals ==
The quarter-finals of the tournament were played on the weekend of 12–13 October 2013. All matches were played at the Nyayo National Stadium in Nairobi.

Of the 8 teams that advanced from the third round, Finlays Horticulture was the only remaining FKF Division One side in the tournament. The other 7 clubs were from the Premier League.

| 12 October 2013 | Mathare United | 0 – 0 (2 – 4 p) | Sony Sugar | Madaraka Estate, Nairobi |
| 14:00 UTC+3 | Monday (yellow card) 39' | Report | | Stadium: Nyayo National Stadium |
| | Penalties |
| | Nzomo (penalty scored); Monday (penalty scored); Mwaura (penalty missed); Wendo (penalty missed) | | (penalty scored) Nyangech; (penalty scored) Chamberi; (penalty scored) Odette; (penalty scored) Barasa |

| 12 October 2013 | Gor Mahia | 2 – 0 | Western Stima | Madaraka Estate, Nairobi |
| 16:30 UTC+3 | Sserunkuma 38', 45'; Kiongera (yellow card) 58' | Report | Ogutu (yellow card) 18'; Kemboi (yellow card) 43' | Stadium: Nyayo National Stadium |

| 13 October 2013 | Sofapaka | 1 – 0 | Finlays Horticulture | Madaraka Estate, Nairobi |
| 14:00 UTC+3 | Baraza 69'; Wanyama (yellow card) 90' | Report | Chole (yellow card) 55' | Stadium: Nyayo National Stadium |

| 13 October 2013 | Karuturi Sports | 0 – 3 | A.F.C. Leopards | Madaraka Estate, Nairobi |
| 16:30 UTC+3 | | Report | Okwemba 6'; Wanga 8', 62'; Imbalambala (yellow card) 90+1' | Stadium: Nyayo National Stadium |

== Semi-finals ==
The semi-finals were played on the weekend of 19–20 October at the Moi International Sports Centre in Kasarani.

Controversy followed the match between Gor Mahia and Sony Sugar when fans of the former invaded the match to attack the latter while celebrating the win. Goalkeeper Wycliffe Kasaya and other players were injured in the fray and admitted to hospital later on.

| 19 October 2013 | Gor Mahia | 0 – 0 (4 – 2 p) | Sony Sugar | Kasarani, Nairobi |
| 16:00 UTC+3 | Njuguna (yellow card) 40' | Report | Odette (yellow card) 6'; Ochieng (yellow card) 34'; Atuta (yellow card) 51'; Kasaya (yellow card) 90' | Stadium: Moi International Sports Centre |
| | Penalties |
| | Oboya (penalty scored); Omondi (penalty scored); Wanyonyi (penalty scored); Owino (penalty scored) | | (penalty scored) Nyangech; (penalty scored) Chamberi; (penalty missed) Odette; (penalty missed) Barasa |

| 20 October 2013 | Sofapaka | 0 – 2 | A.F.C. Leopards | Kasarani, Nairobi |
| 16:00 UTC+3 | Wanyama (yellow card) 63' | Report | Wanga 39' (yellow card) 71'; Wafula 84' | Stadium: Moi International Sports Centre |

== Third place playoff ==
The third place playoff was played on 16 November 2013 at the Nairobi City Stadium.

| 16 November 2013 | Sofapaka | 2 – 1 | Sony Sugar | Shauri Moyo, Nairobi |
| 15:00 UTC+3 | Baraza 72'; Juma 85' | Report | Chamberi 13' | Stadium: City Stadium |

== Final ==
The final was played on Sunday 17 November at the Nyayo National Stadium. It was the final Nairobi derby match of the season. Noah Wafula was named Man of the Match and Player of the Tournament after the game.

| 17 November 2013 | Gor Mahia | 0 – 1 | A.F.C. Leopards | Madaraka Estate, Nairobi |
| 15:00 UTC+3 | | Report | Opiyo 52' | Stadium: Nyayo National Stadium; Referee: Davies Omweno |

== See also ==
- 2013 Kenyan Premier League
- 2013 Kenyan Super Cup (pre-season)
- 2013 Kenyan Super Cup (post-season)
