= 2015 Kenyan Super Cup =

- Event: Kenyan Super Cup
Gor Mahia	Sofapaka
2	1
- Date: 11 February 2015
- Venue: Nyayo National Stadium, Nairobi, Kenya
- Referee: Moses Osano

The 2015 Kenyan Super Cup was a Kenyan football match contested by the 2014 Kenyan Premier League champions Gor Mahia and the 2014 FKF President's Cup champions Sofapaka. Gor Mahia won the match 2–1 after 90 minutes. The winners claimed KSh.750,000/= in prize money while Sofapaka collected KSh.500,000/= as runners-up.

== Road to the Cup ==
=== 2014 Kenyan Premier League standings ===
Pos	Team	Pld	W	D	L	GF	GA	GD	Pts	Qualification or relegation
1	Gor Mahia (C)	30	17	9	4	43	21	+22	60	Qualification for 2015 CAF Champions League
2	Sofapaka	30	16	9	5	49	27	+22	57	Qualification for 2015 CAF Confederation Cup (Note: Sofapaka qualified for the 2015 CAF Confederation Cup as winners of the 2014 FKF President's Cup.)
3	Tusker	30	14	11	5	42	25	+17	53	
4	Ulinzi Stars	30	12	15	3	33	20	+13	51	
5	Chemelil Sugar	30	12	12	6	24	16	+8	48	
6	SoNy Sugar	30	9	14	7	27	21	+6	41 (Note: Sony Sugar were awarded 3 points and 2 goals after AFC Leopards failed to turn up for their match scheduled for 10 December.)	
7	A.F.C. Leopards	30	10	11	9	30	25	+5	41	
8	Muhoroni Youth	30	10	10	10	23	28	−5	40	
9	Thika United	30	9	12	9	31	31	0	39	
10	Mathare United	30	10	8	12	19	25	−6	38	
11	Western Stima	30	9	9	12	26	33	−7	36	
12	Ushuru	30	10	3	17	22	40	−18	33	
13	Bandari	30	5	15	10	23	29	−6	30	
14	Kenya Commercial Bank	30	7	8	15	30	39	−9	29	
15	Nairobi City Stars (R)	30	4	12	14	18	35	−17	24	Relegation to 2015 National Super League
16	Nakuru AllStars (R)	30	3	8	19	13	38	−25	17	Relegation to 2015 National Super League

Updated to match(es) played on 8 November 2014. Source: Kenyan Premier League
Rules for classification: 1) points; 2) goal difference; 3) number of goals scored.
(C) Champions; (R) Relegated

=== 2014 FKF President's Cup bracket ===
Third round
A.F.C. Leopards	3
Mathare United	2
Ligi Ndogo	3
Zoo Kericho	0
Mumbi Nationale	0
Ulinzi Stars	6
Nakumatt	2
Tusker	6
Top Fry AllStars	0
Intercity	2
FC Talanta	1
Administration Police	2
Nyakach United	1
Muhoroni Youth	3
Sofapaka	6
Rift Valley United	0
Gor Mahia	1 (2)
G.F.C. 105	1 (4)
Bandari (w/o)	2
Finlays Horticulture	0
Posta Rangers	4
Ulinzi Warriors	0
Chemelil Sugar	1
MOYAS	0
Kakamega Homeboyz	1 (0)
Shabana	1 (3)
Agrochemical	1
Nairobi Stima	0
Nairobi City Stars	1
Wazito	2
West Kenya Sugar	2
Imara United	0

Fourth round
A.F.C. Leopards	2
Ligi Ndogo	0
Ulinzi Stars	1 (3)
Tusker	1 (5)
Intercity	0 (5)
Administration Police	0 (6)
Muhoroni Youth	1
Sofapaka	2
G.F.C. 105	0
Bandari	2
Posta Rangers	2
Chemelil Sugar	0
Shabana	1
Agrochemical	3
Wazito	1 (4)
West Kenya Sugar	1 (5)

Quarter-finals
A.F.C. Leopards	3
Tusker	2
Administration Police	1
Sofapaka	3
Bandari	0
Posta Rangers	1
Agrochemical	0
West Kenya Sugar	1

Semi-finals
A.F.C. Leopards	0
Sofapaka	2
Posta Rangers	0 (10)
West Kenya Sugar	0 (9)

Final
Sofapaka	2
Posta Rangers	1

== Match details ==
11 February 2015
19:00 UTC+3

Gor Mahia	2–1	Sofapaka
Abondo 25', 68'	Report	Wafula 90' (o.g.)

Nyayo National Stadium, Madaraka Estate, Nairobi
Referee: Moses Osano

== FKF response ==
Following previous threats from the Football Kenya Federation (FKF) to impose sanctions on any official who would take part in the match, an official from Kenyan football's governing body announced that Gor Mahia and Sofapaka would be fined a total of KSh.200,000/= each for participating in a match not sanctioned by the FKF and added that the teams would face further disciplinary action if they continued to defy them. Match referee Moses Osano, linesmen Dorcas Wanza and Stephen Oduor, fourth official Amos Wanjala and match commissioner Paul Kaunda were all also handed three-month bans by the FKF for participating in the match.
