= Kenyan National Super League =

National Super League
- Founded: July 2013
- Country: Kenya
- Confederation: CAF
- Divisions: 2
- Number of clubs: 20
- Level on pyramid: 2
- Promotion to: Premier League
- Relegation to: Division One
- Domestic cup: President's Cup
- Broadcaster(s): FKF TV
- Current: 2025–26

The Kenyan National Super League (also referred to as Betika Super League for sponsorship reasons) is the second tier of the Kenyan football league system, between the Kenyan Premier League and the FKF Division One. The league was formed in line with the introduction of a new six-tier system by the Football Kenya Federation to take effect from the 2014 season.

== Competition ==
There are 20 clubs in the Kenyan National Super League. The season is scheduled as a double round-robin system, with each team playing every other team twice, once at home stadium and once as visitors, for a total of 38 games. Teams receive three points for a win, one point for a draw, and zero points for a loss. Teams are ranked by total points, then goal difference, and then goals scored. At the end of each season, the club with the most points is crowned champion. If points are equal, the goal difference and then goals scored determine the winner. If still equal, the ordering is determined by their head-to-head records. If there is a tie for the championship, for relegation, or for qualification to other competitions, a playoff match at a neutral venue decides rank. The top two teams are promoted to the Premier League, while the third ranked team takes part in a promotion/relegation playoff with the 16th placed team in the Premier League. Similarly, the bottom two teams of the National Super League are relegated to Division One, with the top two teams from both Division One zones promoted in their place.

== Clubs ==
Club	Zone	Location	Stadium	Capacity
Administration Police	A	Nairobi	APTC Ground	Unknown
Agrochemical	B	Muhoroni	Muhoroni Stadium	20,000
Bidco United	A	Thika	Del Monte Grounds	Unknown
Busia United Stars	B	Busia	Busia Stadium	Unknown
FC Talanta	A	Nairobi	Ruaraka Stadium	5,000
Finlays Horticulture	B	Naivasha	Kingfisher Grounds	Unknown
G.F.C. 105	B	Eldoret	The Discipleship Grounds	Unknown
Kakamega Homeboyz	B	Kakamega	Bukhungu Stadium	5,000
Kariobangi Sharks	A	Nairobi	Nairobi City Stadium	15,000
Karuturi Sports	B	Naivasha	Naivasha Stadium	5,000
Ligi Ndogo	A	Nairobi	Ligi Ndogo Grounds	2,000
Mahakama	A	Nairobi	Nairobi City Stadium	15,000
Modern Coast Rangers	A	Mombasa	Refinery Grounds	Unknown
MOYAS	A	Nairobi	Lang'ata Prison Ground	Unknown
Nairobi Stima	A	Nairobi	Nairobi City Stadium	15,000
Nakumatt	A	Nairobi	Ruaraka Stadium	5,000
Nzoia United	B	Bungoma	Kanduyi Stadium	Unknown
Oserian	A	Naivasha	Naivasha Stadium	5,000
Posta Rangers	A	Nairobi	Hope Centre	5,000
Rift Valley United	B	Eldoret	Unknown stadium	Unknown
Shabana	B	Kisii	Gusii Stadium	5,000
St. Joseph	B	Nakuru	Unknown stadium	Unknown
West Kenya Sugar	B	Kakamega	Bukhungu Stadium	5,000
Zoo Kericho	B	Kericho	Green Stadium	5,000

== See also ==
- Kenyan football league system
- Kenyan Premier League
- FKF Division One
