= Danson Chetambe =

Kenyan footballer (born 1995)

Personal information
- Full name: Danson Namasaka Chetambe
- Date of birth: 25 August 1995 (age 31)
- Position: Central midfielder

Youth career
- Firm United

Senior career*
Years	Team	Apps	(Gls)
- Border Lions
- Busia United
–2019	Zoo Kericho		
2019–	Bandari		

International career^{‡}
2021–	Kenya	2	(0)
- * Club domestic league appearances and goals as of 13:39, 1 May 2021 (UTC) ‡ National team caps and goals as of 13:39, 1 May 2021 (UTC)

Danson Namasaka Chetambe (born 25 August 1995) is a Kenyan footballer who plays as a central midfielder for Bandari and the Kenya national football team.

== Club career ==
Chetambe grew up in Teso, Busia County. He played youth football for Firm United before playing senior football with Border Lions, Busia United and Zoo Kericho. He won promotion with Zoo to the Kenyan Premier League in 2017.

In June 2019, Chetambe signed for Bandari, with himself stating that he wished to "help the team win titles this season".

== International career ==
He received his first call-up to the Kenya national football team in March 2021. He made his debut for Kenya on 13 March 2021 in a match against South Sudan and provided the assist for the only goal of the game as Kenya won 1–0.

== Style of play ==
Chetambe plays as a central midfielder and has been described as a playmaker.

== Personal life ==
He is the older brother of fellow footballers Edwin and Erick Nakamasaka.
