= Agrochem =

Agrochem may refer to:

- Agrochemical, a chemical used in farming
- Agricultural chemistry
- AgroChem, Inc.
- Agrochemical F.C.
