= Yanga F.C. =

Kenyan football club

Yanga
- Full name: Yanga Football Club
- Ground: Nyahururu Municipal Stadium; Nyahururu, Kenya
- League: Central Provincial League
- 2012: FKF Division One, Zone B, 19th (relegated)

Yanga Football Club is a football club based in Nyahururu, Kenya.

In the 2025–26 season, they are playing in the FKF Division Two Northern Zone Pool A. They play their home games at the Malindi High School stadium.
