= FKF Division One =

Division One
- Founded: 2012
- Country: Kenya
- Confederation: CAF
- Divisions: Zone A (Eastern); Zone B (Western)
- Number of clubs: 14 (Zone A); 14 (Zone B)
- Level on pyramid: 3
- Promotion to: National Super League
- Relegation to: Regional Leagues
- Domestic cup: President's Cup
- Current champions: Zone A Bandari; Zone B Kakamega Homeboyz (2012)
- Most championships: Zone A Bandari; Zone B Kakamega Homeboyz (1 title each)
- Current: Current season

FKF Division One is the third tier in the Kenyan football league system. It has a promotion and relegation system with the Kenyan National Super League and the Kenyan Provincial League. It is controlled by the Football Kenya Federation. Most member clubs are semi-professional, though some clubs are either fully professional or amateur.

== History ==
The league was formed after the Kenyan Nationwide League was divided into two 16-team zones in 2008. In 2009, the two zones were later restructured to form "Nationwide League Division One" and "Nationwide League Division Two", representing the second and third divisions of Kenyan football. Division One was later renamed the FKL Nationwide League after former governing body Football Kenya Limited, while Division Two was renamed the KFF Nationwide League after former governing body, the Kenya Football Federation. The two leagues were merged after the 2011 season, and the consequent league was divided into Zone A and Zone B, with teams from the eastern and western halves of Kenya, respectively. Due to a lack of enough teams from Zone B, a number of teams were promoted from the provincial leagues in the western half.

For the 2013 season, all Division One teams endorsed a decision to split both Zone A and Zone B into two groups of 12 teams each, increasing the total number of teams in the league to 48. The first group from Zone A comprised teams from the Nairobi, Aberdares and Mount Kenya regions while the second group comprise teams from the Eastern, North and South Coast regions. The first group from Zone B is to comprise teams from the South Nyanza, Central and South Rift regions, while the second group comprise teams from the North Nyanza, North Rift, and Western regions. Winners from each of these four groups will play the winners from the other group in their zone in a two-legged playoff to determine who gains promotion to the Kenyan Premier League for the following season.

From the beginning of the 2014 season, FKF Division One was lowered to the third tier of the Kenyan football league system to give way to the Kenyan National Super League, now putting it above the Kenyan Provincial League, in line with the introduction of a new six-tier system by the Football Kenya Federation to take effect at the beginning of that season.

== Competition ==
There are 24 clubs in each of the two divisions of the FKF Division One. These two divisions are further divided into two groups of 12 teams each. During the course of a season, each club plays the others twice (a double round-robin system), once at their home ground and once at that of their opponents. Teams receive three points for a win and one point for a draw. No points are awarded for a loss. Teams are ranked by total points, then goal difference, and then goals scored. At the end of each season, the winners of each of the 4 groups play the winners of the other group in their zone in a two-legged play-off tie to determine who advances to the Kenyan National Super League, in place of the last two teams from that league, who are then placed in their respective zones depending on their locations of origin. Promoted teams from the Provincial League are also placed in their respective zones depending on their locations of origin.

If points are equal, the goal difference and then goals scored determine the winner. If still equal, teams are deemed to occupy the same position. If there is a tie for the championship, for relegation, or for qualification to other competitions, a play-off match at a neutral venue decides rank.

== Clubs ==
=== Zone A ===
Zone A teams are based in Nairobi, Central, Eastern, North Eastern and Coast, representing the Eastern half of Kenya.

Club	Position in 2012	Number of D1 titles	Last D1 title
Administration Police	5th	0	n/a
Admiral	3rd	0	n/a
Bidco United	2nd	0	n/a
Coast United	12th	0	n/a
Congo JMJ United	11th	0	n/a
Green Berets	13th	0	n/a
Jericho AllStars	1st in Nairobi	0	n/a
Kambakia Christian Centre	1st in Eastern	0	n/a
Kariobangi Sharks	7th	0	n/a
Kenya Revenue Authority	10th	0	n/a
Kibera Celtic	14th	0	n/a
Ligi Ndogo	6th	0	n/a
Magongo Rangers	15th	0	n/a
Mahakama	4th	0	n/a
Malindi	1st in North Coast	0	n/a
Maweni City	1st in South Coast	0	n/a
MOYAS	9th	0	n/a
Nairobi Stima	8th	0	n/a
Nyeri Stima	1st in Central	0	n/a
Rangers	16th in KPL	0	n/a

=== Zone B ===
Zone B teams are based in Rift Valley, Western and Nyanza, representing the Western half of Kenya.

Club	Position in 2012	Number of D1 titles	Last D1 title
Agrochemical	3rd	0	n/a
Comply	16th	0	n/a
Finlays Horticulture	5th	0	n/a
G.F.C. 105	10th	0	n/a
Kisumu Municipal	12th	0	n/a
Kolongolo	1st in Western	0	n/a
Longonot Horticulture	9th	0	n/a
Mumcop	2nd in Western	0	n/a
Nakuru AllStars	4th	0	n/a
Nzoia United	2nd	0	n/a
Oserian	15th in KPL	0	n/a
Raiders	1st in Nyanza	0	n/a
Rush	11th	0	n/a
Shabana Kisii	14th	0	n/a
SOIN Fluorspar	7th	0	n/a
St. Joseph	1st in Rift Valley	0	n/a
Timsales	13th	0	n/a
Utawala	15th	0	n/a
West Kenya Sugar	6th	0	n/a
Zoo Kericho	8th	0	n/a

== Previous winners ==
=== Zone A ===
- 2012: Bandari (Mombasa)
- 2013: Kenya Revenue Authority (Nairobi)

=== Zone B ===
- 2012: Kakamega Homeboyz (Kakamega)
- 2013: Top Fry AllStars (Nakuru)

== Top scorers in recent seasons ==
Year	Zone A			Zone B		
Year	Player	Club	Goals	Player	Club	Goals
2012	(Liberia) Roosevelt Blaty	Admiral	32	(Kenya) Valen Semi Mahero	Nzoia United	26
2013	(Kenya) Nelson Simwa	West Kenya Sugar	14	(Kenya) Musa Ochieng	Busia United Stars	11
2013	(Kenya) Nelson Simwa	West Kenya Sugar	14	(Kenya) Martin Oliech	Oserian	11
