= Modern Coast Rangers F.C. =

Kenyan football club

Modern Coast Rangers
- Full name: Modern Coast Rangers FC
- Nickname: magongo stars
- Ground: Refinery Grounds
- Capacity: ?
- Chairman: ?
- Head coach: ?
- League: Kenyan National Super League
- 2013: FKF Division One

Modern Coast Rangers is an association football club based in Mombasa, Kenya. The club competes in the Kenyan National Super League.

== History ==
Previously known as Magongo Rangers, the club acquired its current name in 2013 after a sponsorship agreement with The Modern Coast Company.

== Stadium ==
The team currently plays its home games at the Refinery Grounds.
