= List of accounting firms in Kenya =

This is a list of accounting companies operating in Kenya. They are regulated by the Institute of Certified Public Accountants of Kenya:

- Gichuri & Partners
- PwC Kenya
- Deloitte
- KPMG East Africa
- Ernst & Young
- Baker Tilly International
- PKF Eastern Africa
- HLB International
- RSM E.A.
- Grant Thornton
- Crowe Global
- Mazars
- Patrick and Associates
