= Thomas Wanyama =

Kenyan footballer

Personal information
- Full name: Thomas Khumba Wanyama
- Date of birth: 15 April 1989 (age 37)
- Place of birth: Nairobi, Kenya
- Height: 1.81 m (5 ft 11 1/2 in)
- Position: Defender

Team information
- Current team: Mathare United

Senior career*
Years	Team	Apps	(Gls)
2008–2009	Nairobi City Stars		
2010–2015	Sofapaka		
2016–	Mathare United		

International career^{‡}
2012	Kenya	2	(0)
- * Club domestic league appearances and goals as of 09:44, 1 May 2017 (UTC) ‡ National team caps and goals as of 09:44, 1 May 2017 (UTC)

Thomas Khumba Wanyama (born 15 April 1989) is a Kenyan international footballer who plays for Mathare United, as a defender.

== Career ==
Wanyama has played club football for Nairobi City Stars, Sofapaka and Mathare United. In October 2010, Wanyama went to France to trial with a number of teams.

He made his international debut for Kenya in 2012, earning two caps.

== Personal life ==
Wanyama is brother to fellow players McDonald Mariga and Victor Wanyama.
