= Timsales F.C. =

Kenyan football club

Timsales
- Full name: Timsales Football Club
- League: FKF Division One
- 2013: 7th (Zone B, Group 1)

Timsales Football Club is a professional association football club based in Elburgon, Kenya. They compete in FKF Division One, the third tier of the Kenyan football league system.

The team is owned by Kenyan wood manufacturing company Timsales Limited.
