= Rift Valley United F.C. =

Kenyan football club

Rift Valley United
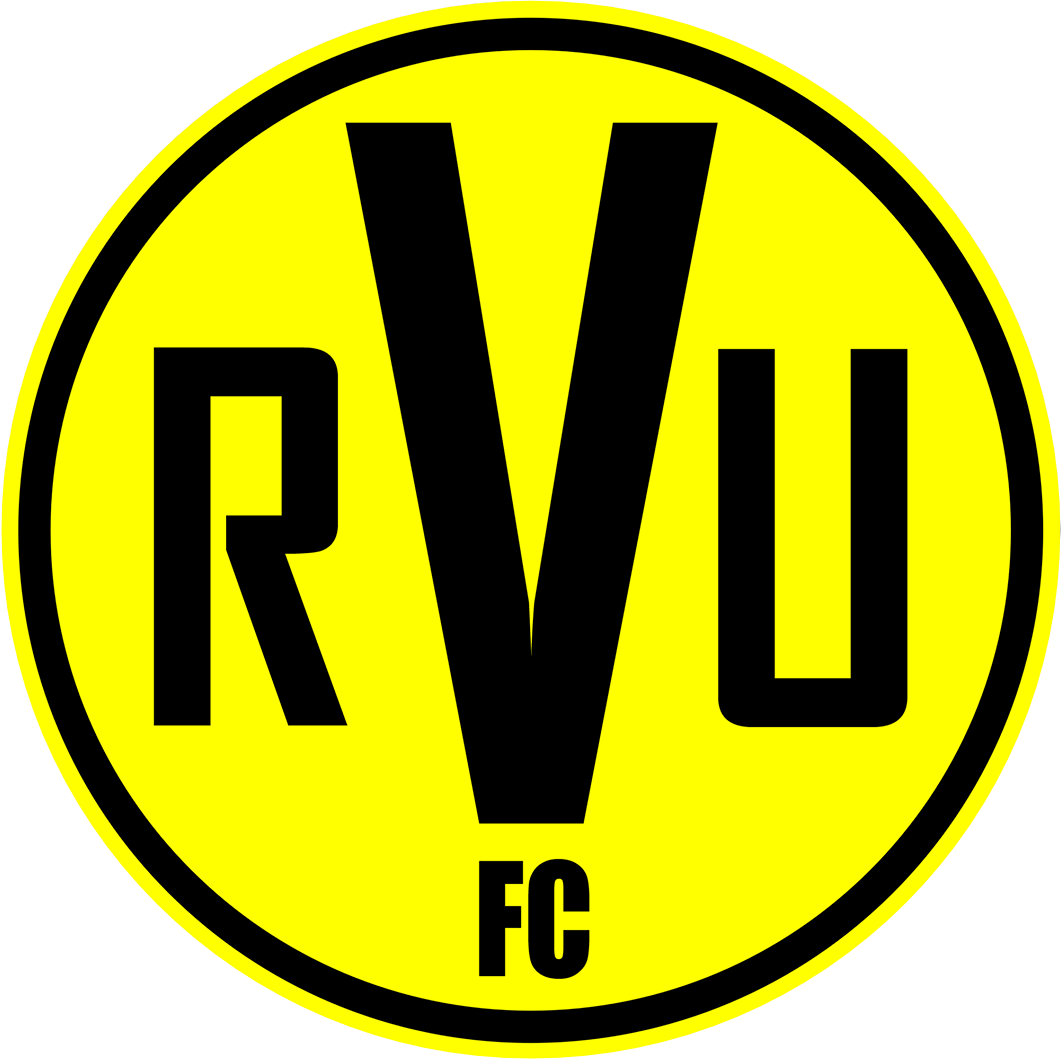
- Full name: Rift Valley United Football Club
- Ground: Kipchoge Keino Stadium, Eldoret, Uasin Gishu
- Capacity: 10,000
- League: Kenyan National Super League
- 2013: FKF Division One, 3rd (Zone B, Group 2) (promoted)
Home colours

Rift Valley United Football Club is an association football club based in Eldoret, Kenya. The club competes in the Kenyan National Super League, and was known as Hotsprings Football Club until 31 March 2014.

== Stadium ==
The club currently plays its home games at the Kipchoge Keino Stadium in Eldoret, Uasin Gishu.
