= Admiral F.C. =

Kenyan football club

Admiral
- Full name: Admiral Football Club
- Ground: Apostle Grounds
- Capacity: ?
- League: FKF Division One
- 2013 FKF Division One: 6th (Zone A, Group 2)
| Home colours | Away colours |

Admiral Football Club is an association football club based in Mombasa, Kenya. The team competes in FKF Division One and plays its home games at the Apostle Grounds.
