= Utawala F.C. =

Kenyan football club

Utawala
- Full name: Utawala Football Club
- Ground: Afraha Stadium
- Capacity: 8,200
- League: FKF Division One

Utawala Football Club is a professional association football club based in Nakuru, Kenya. The club competes in the FKF Division One, and plays its home games at the Afraha Stadium.
