= Afraha Stadium =

Sports venue in Nakuru, Kenya

Coordinates: 0°17′43″S 36°04′25″E

- Interactive map of Afraha Stadium
- Full name: Afraha Stadium
- Location: Nakuru, Kenya
- Capacity: 8,200

Tenants
- Ulinzi Stars; Comply F.C. Nakuru AllStars; Utawala F.C.

The Afraha Stadium is a multi-purpose stadium in Nakuru, Kenya. It is used mostly for football matches and is the home stadium of Nakuru AllStars of the Kenyan Premier League and Ulinzi Stars of the Kenyan Premier League. The stadium holds 8,200 people and opened in 1948.
