= Busia United Stars F.C. =

Kenyan football club

Busia United Stars
- Full name: Busia United Stars Football Club
- Nickname: Starries
- Founded: 1997
- Ground: Busia Nails Stadium
- Capacity: 1800
- Owner: Victor Wanyama
- Manager: Silvester Oseno
- League: Kenyan National Super League
- 2013: FKF Division One, 6th (Zone B, Group 2)

United Stars Football Club is an association football club based in Busia, Kenya. The club competes in the Kenyan National Super League, and plays its home games at the Busia Nails Stadium.

The club was formerly known as Outgrowers Football Club until the 2013 season of FKF Division One.
