= St. Joseph F.C. =

Association football club in Kenya

St. Joseph
- Full name: St. Joseph Football Club
- Nickname: senti
- Founded: 2006; 20 years ago
- Ground: Afraha Stadium B
- Capacity: unknown
- Chairman: David Gikaria
- Manager: Nicholas Mbogo
- League: Kenyan National Super League

St. Joseph Football Club is an association football club based in Nakuru, Kenya. The club competes in the Kenyan National Super League.
