= West Kenya Sugar F.C. =

Kenyan football club

West Kenya Sugar
- Full name: West Kenya Sugar Football Club
- Founded: 2007
- Ground: Bukhungu Stadium
- Capacity: 25,000
- Head coach: Nelson Simwa
- League: Kenyan National Super League
- 2013: FKF Division One

West Kenya Sugar Football Club is a professional association football club based in Kakamega, Kenya. The club competes in the Kenyan National Super League. The club was known as Kabrass United Football Club until July 2012.

== History ==
The club was founded in 2007 by Matthew Dane Norman and Antony Golec, and has an association with Aldershot Town F.C.

== Stadium ==
The team currently plays its home games at the 25,000-capacity Bukhungu Stadium.
