= Muhoroni Stadium =

Sports venue in Muhoroni, Kenya

- Bafra Stadium
- Full name: Muhoroni Stadium
- Former names: Biafra Stadium
- Location: Muhoroni, Kenya
- Owner: Muhoroni Youth football Club
- Capacity: 20,000

Construction
- Groundbreaking: 1998
- Built: 2000
- Opened: 2012
- Renovated: 2012
- Expanded: ongoing

Tenants
- Muhoroni Youth; Agrochemical

The Muhoroni Stadium previously called Biafra Stadium is a multi-purpose stadium in Muhoroni, Kenya. It used mostly for football matches and is the home stadium of Muhoroni Youth of the Kenyan Premier League since 2012

The stadium holds 20,000 people and is owned by Muhoroni Youth Football Club. The Clubs Champion partner is Muhoroni Sugar Company who donated the land to the community. The company though in receivership management is a leading Brown Sugar manufacturer from which Muhoroni sugar is derived.
