= Finlays Horticulture A.F.C. =

Kenyan football club

Finlays Horticulture
- Full name: Finlays Horticulture Association Football Club
- Founded: 2011
- Ground: Kingfisher Grounds; Naivasha, Kenya
- League: Kenyan National Super League
- 2013: FKF Division One, 2nd (Zone B, Group 2) (promoted)

Finlays Horticulture Association Football Club is an association football club based in Naivasha, Kenya. The club competes in the Kenyan National Super League, and plays its home games at the Kingfisher Grounds.

== History ==
The club was formed in 2011 after its owners, the Finlays Horticulture Company, acquired the Homegrown Horticulture Company and former Kenyan Premier League side Homegrown Football Club along with it.
