= Gusii Stadium =

Coordinates: 0.676904°S 34.769298°E

- Interactive map of Gusii Stadium
- Full name: Gusii Stadium
- Location: Kisii, Kenya
- Capacity: 15,000

Tenant
- Shabana Kisii

Gusii Stadium is a multi-use stadium in Kisii, Kenya. It is used mostly for football matches and is the home stadium of Shabana Kisii. The stadium has a capacity of 15,000. It was expanded in the 2020s.
