= Administration Police =

Paramilitary security organization

Administration Police Service Polisi wa Utawala Kenya
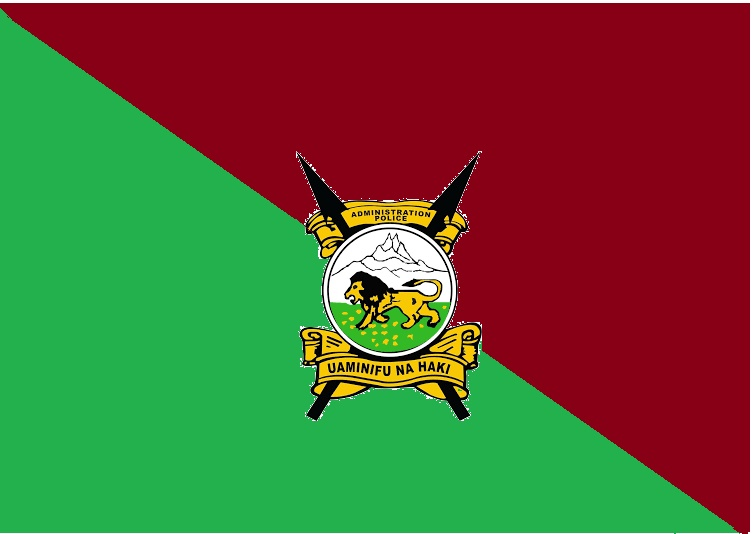
- Flag of Administration Police
- Common name: Administration Police; Kanga
- Motto: Uaminifu na Haki (English: "Integrity and Justice")

Agency overview
- Formed: 1958
- Employees: 30,000

Jurisdictional structure
- Operations jurisdiction: KEN
- Map of Administration Police Service's jurisdiction
- Area: 581,309 square kilometres (224,445 sq mi)
- Population: 47,564,000 Kenya
- Governing body: Kenya
- General nature: Civilian police

Operational structure
- Headquarters: Jogoo House, Taifa Rd, Nairobi
- Agency executive: Deputy Inspector General, Gilbert Masengeli
- Parent agency: National Police Service
- Units: Rapid Deployment Unit (RDU); National Government Administration Police Unit(NGAPU); Border Police Unit (BPU); Anti-Stock Theft Unit (ASTU); Security of Government Buildings Unit (SGB); Critical Infrastructure Protection Unit (CIPU)
- Directorates: General Administration; Operations; Human Capital Management; Logistics; Training and Reforms; Complaints and Inspections; Legal Affairs

Website
- www.aps.go.ke

The Administration Police Service (APS; Swahili: Polisi wa Utawala Kenya) is a paramilitary security organization and is a branch of the Republic of Kenya's National Police Service.

== Overview ==
The APS was formed in 1958 and has its headquarters in Nairobi, Kenya. It is overseen by the Deputy Inspector of Police (DIG), who currently is Gilbert Masengeli, MBS, OGW, SS.

It became part of the National Police Service, which also consists of the Kenya Police, when it was created in 2011 by articles 243–247 of the Constitution of Kenya.

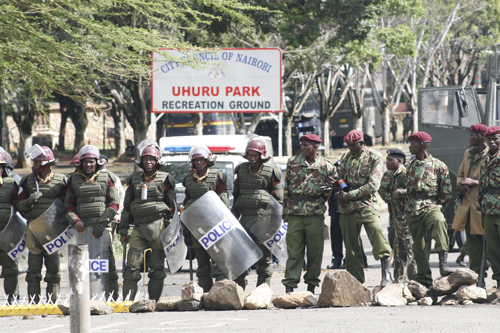
Administration Police in anti-riot gear serving alongside GSU officers at Uhuru Park. (January 2008)

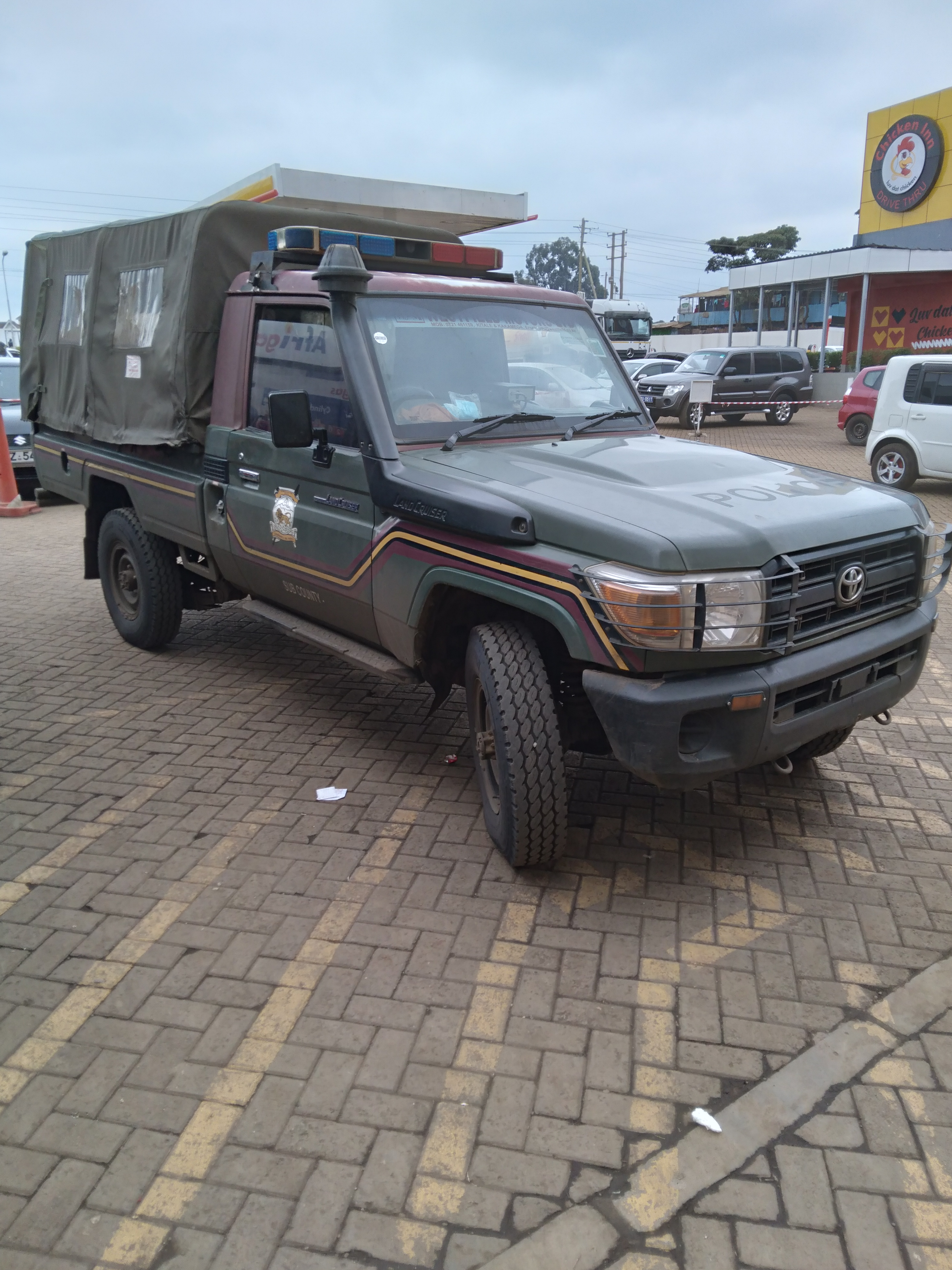
Administration Police vehicle in western Nairobi, 2021

== History ==
The Administration Police traces its origins to 1902, with the enactment of the Village Headman Ordinance, which was intended to bring the native barter economy into harmony with the British colony's emerging currency economy. The ordinance raised taxes and regulated agriculture, livestock farming, and other social matters. The village headman at the time had to rely on village 'warriors' or 'tough' youths to enforce the colonial government's policies and to arbitrate native matters, due to the unpopularity of the policies. These local warriors took on the role of native policing. In 1929, Tribal Police Ordinance No. 10 was enacted. The objective of this ordinance was to provide command, administrative powers, training, and armament to the native police, which was renamed the Tribal Police (TP).

In this early period, through the 1950s, the Tribal Police underwent many improvements, including adopting uniforms—borrowed from the Kings African Rifles and the Kenya Police, "Kangas" and "Dub'cas"—increasing armament and manpower, and adding a reserve component. Training became mandatory and focused on basic recruit instruction, promotional courses, and prosecution courses to service native courts.

In 1958, the current Administration Police Act was implemented. This act strengthened the Administration Police's policing and broadened its mandate for national security, marking a shift from the Tribal Police Ordinance. The new changes were reflected in the structure of the APS organization, with ranks from constable to sergeant major being established.

During the early period of independence, to the late 1970s, the APS transformed itself from being a localized police service to one where personnel served in all parts of the country.

Training policies were changed to reflect internationally accepted standards of democratic policing. In 1967, centralized training was relocated from Ruringu, Nyeri, to the Administration Police Training School in Embakasi.

The 1960s also saw the APS establish its place in post-independence national security, by carrying out counter-insurgency assignments against Shifta rebels in northern Kenya.

In 1978, the officer rank of inspector was introduced, followed by Gazetted Officers (GOs) in 1981.

In 1987, the first female officers joined the Administration Police. As part of a concerted effort, over 4,600 female Administration Police officers were in the service by 2015. Many have been deployed to specialist posts, and a number have become officers as part of their career development.

Since 2000, the APS headquarters has been reorganised, with the establishment of support elements: which include communication, quartermaster, logistics, finance, information communication technology, medical, operations planning, and research. There was also an introduction of new units to address border security, counterterrorism, and banditry, with enhanced operational capabilities beyond ordinary law enforcement.

== Structure/Units ==
The APS is divided into headquarters, training colleges, and formed units, which are equipped to carry out police duties, including preserving law and order and responding to national emergencies.

Following the reforms of 2018, APS officers no longer perform general police duties, which are now the preserve of the Kenya Police Service.

=== Rapid Deployment Unit (RDU) ===
The Rapid Deployment Unit (RDU) is the equivalent of the General Service Unit of the Kenya Police Service; it is also known as Radi (lightning in Swahili). It was formed in 2000, with Senior Assistant Commissioner of Administration Police Davis Mawinyi as the first commanding officer. Elijah Osodo (AIG) succeeded him. It is now headed by a commandant (Cmdt), Aggrey Shamala Mboto.

Throughout the 1960s, the Administration Police (AP) were regularly deployed to fight the Shifta War in northeastern Kenya. The force was then deployed to curb rampant poaching in the 1970s and 1980s. It was also deployed to combat lawlessness in the northern Rift Valley region in the 1980s.

The AP operational deployment was initially composed of officers seconded from other divisions, as well as Administration Police Training College (APTC) staff and course mates, to counter specific hostilities.

Ad hoc units were formed within the AP to address specific localized situations. These include the Anti-Shifta Unit, formed in 1980 based at Garissa district; the Anti-Bandit Unit, formed in 1986 and based at Tana River and Lamu districts; and the Rapid Anti-Bandit Unit, formed in 1997 and based at AP Training College.

These operations were often unsustainable and had limited success; thus, the Rapid Deployment Unit was established in 2000. The unit receives tactical training, as well as regular training and refresher courses.

The unit receives additional tactical training from the U.S. Marines. As a result, it has a pool of specially trained and prepared personnel on standby who possess ready supplies, transport, and material to support deployment.

The RDU operates independently of the Administration Police in its deployment, so as not to affect normal operations of the latter. A commandant heads it, and is authorized to deploy personnel within Kenya to respond to any emergency or threat to law and order for a particular period.

=== Border Police Unit (BPU) ===
The Border Police Unit (BPU) was formed on 1 July 2008 as the Rural Border Patrol Unit (RBPU) with its first base at A.P. Senior Staff College, Emali. The idea of a Border Patrol Unit was recommended by the then–Senior Deputy Commandant (I) of the AP Alhaji Omar Shurie, (SAIG, Egypt 2), a senior fieldcraft and tactics/jungle warfare instructor. Mr. Otieno, AIG, who once served as deputy C.O. of the Rapid Deployment Unit became its first C.O.

It was established as the Border Patrol Unit; but due to limited facilities and equipment, it was not made operational.

In September 2018, President Uhuru Kenyatta announced plans to reorganize the National Police Service. These plans included the strengthening and renaming of the RBPU to the Border Police Unit.

The task of the BPU is to detect and prevent cross-border crimes through border patrol and to conduct terrorist interdiction operations.

The BPU has its headquarters at Kanyonyo in Kitui County. It is now headed by a commandant (Cmdt), who currently is James Kamau, EBS, OGW (S.A.I.G).

Formations in the field, known as companies, are each headed by a superintendent (SP). There are at least 20 such companies in the unit, each of which has three platoons, each headed by an inspector (IP). Each platoon is further divided into sections of at least ten personnel each.

The unit's training institution is the Border Patrol School, also based at Kanyonyo, Joshua Wambua, SSP, (a decorated jungle warfare/ ballistics/ forensics instructor) as the C.O. Its instructors are trained both locally and internationally.

The unit has two specialized teams, the "Marine unit", the Border and Sea Operations Team (BORSOPTS), and the Special Weapons and Tactics Team. These teams have had successful field operations within the country, including the Yumbis attack of 2015.

In terms of equipment and logistics, the unit has moved and is now ahead of its mother unit the Rapid Deployment Unit. Recently the National Police Service acquired armoured personnel carriers (APCs) from China's defense corporation Norinco.

=== Anti-Stock-Theft Unit ===
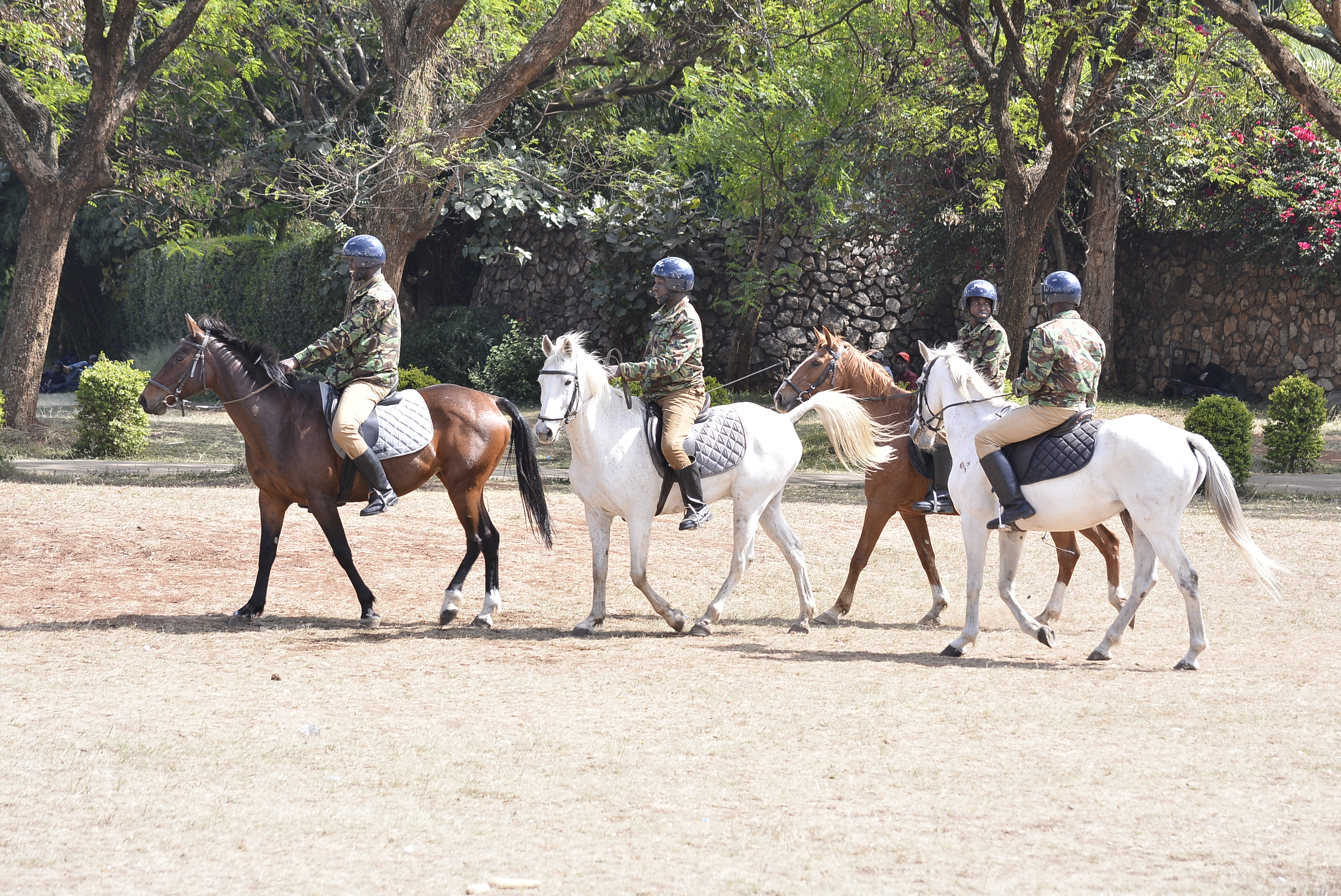
ASTU mounted police

The Anti-Stock-Theft Unit was established in 1965 as part of the Kenya Police. The unit became a part of the Administration Police in 2018. The commandant of the unit, which is based in Gilgil, now reports directly to the Deputy Inspector General of the Administration Police.

Currently, the unit has 13 field companies. Each company has three platoons; there are also a headquarters company and a mounted company. Field companies are deployed mainly in the pastoral areas of the Rift Valley and the Eastern Province. The mounted company breeds and trains horses and camels for police work. The number of Anti-Stock-Theft Unit personnel stands at 2,500 and is being increased to 5,000.

=== Security of Government Buildings Unit ===
The Security of Government Buildings Unit (SGB) was established in 1977, to provide security for government buildings within the Nairobi area. The unit was then known as Government Buildings Security (GBS). It was a subunit of AP headed by an officer commanding (OC). A year later, it was renamed SGB (Security of Government Buildings Unit).

In 1992, the unit was further strengthened and was headed by a Commanding Officer (CO). By 2005, the commander had been upgraded to a commandant. It is now headed by Lazarus Opicho, SS, HSC, ndc(K)

==== Services provided ====
- Bodyguards—provision of close protection, as directed by the government.
- Residence security—24-hour maximum security to those accorded this service.
- Protection of vital government installations and institutions.
- Back-up armed sentries to designated government buildings and installations.
- Cash-in-transit for government institutions and private firms.

https://www.the-star.co.ke/news/2024-08-14-masengeli-names-new-deputy-moves-top-aps-officers

=== Critical Infrastructure Protection Unit (CIPU) ===
Critical Infrastructure Protection Unit (CIPU) was formed in late 2016, following increased threats to critical infrastructure, such as power lines, fiber optic lines, roads, and data centers. The unit is the largest one in the Administration Police, with offices throughout the country. This unit is headquartered in Athi River.

==== Services provided ====
- Protection of government buildings and data centers (courts, Huduma Centers, government offices, one-stop border points of the Kenya Revenue Authority (KRA), etc.).
- Protection of the electricity sector, including power lines, substations, off-grid generation stations, repeater stations, data centers, and fiber optics.
- Protection of the energy sector, including oilfields, oil pipelines, spur lines, flowline control rooms, refined petroleum storage tanks, pump stations, auxiliary equipment, and cathodic and radio networks.
- Protection of the information and communications technology (ICT) sector's installed networks (fiber-optic cables, submarine cables, telecommunication lines, and the postal network).
- Protection of water points (storage water tanks).
- Protection of technical and educational institutions.
- Protection of banks.
- Protection of cash in transit.
- Surveillance and protection against threats of use of force, terror, espionage, sabotage, cybercrime, vandalism, and other crimes targeted against information transmitted via critical infrastructure assets.

=== National Government Administration Police Unit (NGAPU) ===
NGAPU is a new unit under the Administration Police Service (APS) launched in 2025. Head office is in Nairobi, with teams at regional, county, and local levels. They're working with about 3,950 chiefs and 9,043 assistants to make sure communities are safe and government services reach everyone.

==== Services offered ====
- Help chiefs enforce laws and implement government policies
- Support law and order by arresting suspects and keeping evidence
- Work with other police units and government agencies to keep communities safe
- Improve safety at local levels across Kenya

== Ranks ==
The Administration Police wear badges of rank on their uniforms (enlisted ranks—constable to senior sergeant—on the sleeves, and officer ranks—inspector to inspector general—on the shoulders). After being approved by the National Police Service Commission in 2016, the uniforms committee unveiled new insignia for the revised rank structure. The order of the ranks of Administration Police and the corresponding insignia is as follows:

Rank group	Inspectors general				Commissioner	Superintendent
Administration Police
Administration Police	Inspector general	Deputy inspector general	Senior assistant inspector general	Assistant inspector general	Commissioner	Senior superintendent	Superintendent	Assistant superintendent

Rank group	Inspectors
Administration Police						No insignia
Administration Police	Chief inspector	Inspector	Senior sergeant	Sergeant	Corporal	Constable

== See also ==
- Kenya Police
- Military of Kenya
