= Shabana F.C. =

Association football club in Kenya

Shabana
- Full name: Shabana Football Club
- Nicknames: Glamour Boys; Tore Bobe
- Founded: 1982
- Ground: Gusii Stadium
- Capacity: 15,000
- Chairman: Jared Nivaton Ombongi
- Manager: Ahmed Fathi Abdalla Ibrahim
- League: FKF Premier League
- 2025–26: 5th
Home colours	Away colours	Third colours

Shabana Football Club, more commonly known as Shabana or Shabana Kisii, is a professional association football club based in Kisii, Kenya, playing in the FKF Premier League.

== History ==
Shabana Football Club was founded in 1980 by Kisii-based businessman Dogo Khan. The club quickly rose through the ranks of Kenyan football and finished third in the 1987 Kenyan First Division with 50 points, behind Gor Mahia and AFC Leopards. This performance earned them qualification to the 1988 edition of the African Cup of Champions Clubs, the predecessor to the CAF Champions League.

The club experienced a major setback in 2006 due to a dispute over its relegation from the Kenyan Premier League. Shabana was expected to compete in the second-tier Nationwide League, but refused to participate, insisting they still belonged in the Premier League, which did not re-admit them. Consequently, Shabana did not participate in any league competition in 2007. The club later regrouped under the new name Gusii United Football Club and eventually returned to competitive football.

Shabana continued their rise, winning the second-tier league title in 2014 and earning promotion after topping Zone B of the FKF Division One.

On 28 October 2018, Shabana earned promotion to the Kenyan National Super League after defeating Mwatate United in a penalty shootout. The match ended 1–1 in regulation time and was played at the Kasarani Stadium in Nairobi.

Shortly afterward, on 28 November 2018, Gilbert Selebwa was appointed head coach, assisted by Kanuli Rix. Selebwa later resigned in October 2019 due to a salary dispute.

In the 2022/2023 season, Shabana finished top of the Kenyan National Super League, sealing promotion to the FKF Premier League after defeating Kisumu All Stars in the final match of the season at a fully packed Gusii Stadium.

Shabana FC is one of the most popular football clubs in Kisii County, Kenya. The team was formed in the early 1980s and quickly rose to become a top contender in Kenyan football. They spent over two decades in the top flight before being relegated in 2006.

Shabana fought their way back to the National Super League and later won promotion to the FKF Premier League. They returned to top-flight football in the 2023/24 season.

The team plays its home matches at Gusii Stadium, which has recently been upgraded to host Premier League matches.

Their games against Gor Mahia often attract huge crowds and have become some of the most heated fixtures in Kenyan football. The rivalry has grown intense, especially since Shabana’s promotion, as they aim to challenge the established giants.

The club has also secured strong sponsorships, helping them remain competitive in the league. Their focus is now on staying in the top tier and building a team that can compete for titles in the coming seasons.

Shabana FC currently plays its home matches at Gusii Stadium, a significant landmark for the club’s large fanbase.

== Performance in CAF competitions ==
- African Cup of Champions Clubs: 1 appearance

1988: First Round knocked out.
