= Kenya Revenue Authority =

Tax collection agency of Kenya

Agency overview
- Formed: 1995
- Jurisdiction: Government of Kenya
- Headquarters: Times Tower, Haile Selassie Avenue, Nairobi, Kenya
- Agency executives: Ndiritu Muriithi, Chairperson of the Board of Directors; Humphrey Wattanga, Commissioner General
- Parent agency: Ministry of the National Treasury and Economic Planning
- Website: http://www.kra.go.ke/

Kenya Revenue Authority (KRA) is an agency of the Government of Kenya that is responsible for the assessment, collection and accounting of all revenues that are due to the government in accordance with the laws of Kenya.

== History ==
The Kenya Revenue Authority (KRA) was established by an Act of Parliament, the Kenya Revenue Authority Act, which became effective on 1 July 1995. The Authority is charged with collecting revenue on behalf of the Government of Kenya.

The Authority's core operations are:-

1. To assess, collect and account for all revenues in accordance with the written laws and the specified provisions of the written laws.
2. To advise on matters relating to the administration of, and collection of revenue under the written laws or the specified provisions of the written laws.
3. To perform such other functions in relation to revenue as the Cabinet Secretary responsible for matters relating to finance may direct.

Recently, the government of Kenya proposed the renaming of the agency from the current KRA to the Kenya Revenue Service(KRS) in order to portray the agency as a service provider to the citizenry as opposed to a powerful authority.

== Organizational structure ==
The organization is divided into seven major departments, each headed by a Commissioner:

1. Customs & Border Control Department (C&BC)
2. Domestic Taxes Department (DTD)
3. Intelligence & Strategic Operations Department (I&SO)
4. Investigations & Enforcement Department (I&E)
5. Strategy, Innovation & Risk Management Department (SIRM)
6. Corporate Support Services Department (CSS)
7. Legal Services & Board Coordination Department (LS&BC)

In addition to the seven major departments, the Authority has the following four other departments to harmonize operations and efficiency. (a) Transformation and Leadership Office (b) Kenya School of Revenue Administration (c) Internal Audit Department (d) Marketing & Communication Department.

To increase tax compliance percentages and encourage more people to file their taxes, the Kenya Revenue Authority has an elaborate online portal that allows citizens to log in and either file tax returns, check their penalties or apply for a certificate of tax compliance. This is in line with the Kenyan government's efforts to automate service delivery through the e-Citizen initiative and avoid long, inconvenient physical queues.

== Regional divisions ==
To ease tax assessment and collection and to take services closer to the people, the agency maintains six service regions as listed below:

1. North Rift Region, which is headquartered in Eldoret
2. South Rift Region, which is headquartered in Nakuru.
3. Western Region, which is headquartered in Kisumu.
4. Southern Region, with headquarters in Mombasa.
5. Northern Region, with headquarters in Embu.
6. Central Region, which is headquartered in Nyeri.
7. Nairobi Region, which is headquartered in Nairobi.

== Governance ==
The current Chairperson of the Board of Directors of the Kenya Revenue Authority is Anthony Mwaura. The Commissioner General as of 22 August 2023, is Humphrey Wattanga.

== Football club ==
The KRA owns a football club called Ushuru F.C., which competes in the Kenyan Premier League.

== Kenya School of Revenue Administration (KESRA-KRA) ==
Kenya School of Revenue Administration (KESRA) is the Kenya Revenue Authority’s premier training school specializing in Tax and Customs Administration, Fiscal Policy and Management. The School is one of the only four World Customs Organization (WCO) accredited Regional Training Centres (RTCs) in Africa.

== See also ==
- List of Accounting Firms in Kenya
- Economy of Kenya
