= Agrochemical F.C. =

Kenyan football club

- Full name: Agrochemical Football Club
- Nicknames: Agrochemicals; Agro
- Founded: 1989
- Ground: Furaha Academy Sports Ground; Muhoroni, Kenya
- Capacity: 5,000
- Chairman: Atik Ochieng
- Head coach: (Kenya) James Omondi
- League: Kenyan National Super League
- 2013: FKF Division One, 5th (Zone B, Group 1) (promoted)
Home colours

Agrochemical Football Club (widely known as Agrochemicals) is a Kenyan football club based in Muhoroni. The club is a member of the Kenyan National Super League, the second level in the Kenyan football league system. Their home stadium is the Furaha Academy Sports Ground.

== History ==
The club is owned by the Agrochemical and Food Company Limited.

Agrochemicals played in the Nyanza North Provincial League from 1989 to 1997, when it won promotion to the Nationwide League. In 2005 it was promoted to the Kenyan Premier League.

At the end of the 2009 season Agrochemical was relegated to the FKL Nationwide League.
