= G.F.E. 105 =

Kenyan football club

G.F.E 105 FC
- Full name: Global Field Evangelism 105 Football club formerly known as F.C 105 and Kidiwa 105 FC
- Nickname: 105, gospellers
- Founded: 2003
- Ground: Eldoret A.S.K show ground Eldoret, Uasin Gishu
- Capacity: 5,000
- Chairman: Shem Mburu
- Manager: Henry Chelule
- Coach: Bright Kirya
- League: FKF Division One
- 2025: FKF Division One, 4th (Zone B) (promoted)

G.F.E. 105 FC is an association football club based in Eldoret, Kenya. The club was formerly known as F.C 105 before the Management (Joshua and Ray) teamed up with global field evangelism under Bishop Ben Bahati hence the name G.F.E 105 FC. The club competes in the FKF DIVISION ONE zone B, and plays its home games at Eldoret A.S.K show ground after the closure of Kipchoge stadium, which is being renovated for in preparation for AFCON 2027.

== Notable players ==
- Duke Abuya
