= Nakuru AllStars =

Kenyan football club

- Full name: Nakuru AllStars
- Nickname: AllStars
- Founded: 2010 (reformed from the 1961 club)
- Ground: Afraha Stadium, Nakuru, Kenya
- Capacity: 8,200
- Chairman: (Kenya) Robert Muthomi
- Manager: (Kenya) Jimmy Angila
- League: Nakuru County League
- 2019: Nakuru County League; 8th
- Website: http://www.nakuruallstars.com/

The Nakuru AllStars are a Kenyan association football club based in Nakuru. The club competes in the Nakuru County League the Kenyan Fifth division after their relegation from the National Super League in 2018 and ceding their position in the Division One after suffering financial difficulties.

The club was reformed and created as a continuation of the former Nakuru AllStars, who won the Kenya National Football League in 1963 and 1969.

In 2010, Kenyan Robert Muthomi reformed and revived the club and its name with a selection of players at under-15 level. Muthomi is a former player's representative who is now the General Secretary and Chief Executive Officer of Football Kenya Federation. The club received media attention from Denmark as prominent sports website Bold.dk co-founder Pierre Vendelboe was an investor in the club. Vendelboe was part of a consortium which purchased the football club AC Nakuru, and included and merged it with the rest of the Nakuru AllStars club.

Among the members of the new technical staff was Sammy Nyongesa who was a player with the original team in 1969 when it last won the league. He has also previously coached the Kenya national football team and is known in Nakuru for running the Youth Olympic centre that produced such as players as Ambrose Ayoyi and John Muiruri

In 2011, the Nakuru AllStars played in the FKL Nationwide League. When the new owners came in the former team had amassed 9 points from 12 matches and were firmly in the relegation spot but by the end of the season the team had gained 39 points to finish in position 10 out of the 16 teams that made the league under the tutelage of former Kenyan international Simon Mulama.

On 8 May 2013, the Nakuru AllStars signed a sponsorship deal with Menengai Oil Refineries, and through their Top Fry brand, changed the team's name to Nakuru Top Fry AllStars. However, the team's association with the club ended during the 2015 season, while the team opened a food processing plant in Nakuru in order to become a self-sustaining club.

In 2016 having been relegated from the Kenyan Premier League the previous season, the club signed a five year sponsorship deal with giant Kenyan betting firm SportPesa.

AllStars only managed 21 points in 35 games and were relegated to the third division in 2018.
