= 2009 in Kenyan football =

Football in Kenya
- Season: 2009

Men's football
- Premier League: Sofapaka
- FKL Cup: A.F.C. Leopards
- Super Cup: Gor Mahia

The following article is a summary of the 2009 football season in Kenya, the 46th competitive season in its history.

== Promotion and relegation ==
Promoted to Premier League

- A.F.C. Leopards
- Sofapaka

Relegated from Premier League

- Mahakama
- Mathare Youth

== Premier League ==
The 2009 Kenyan Premier League began on 7 February 2009 and ended on 21 November 2009.

Pos	Team	Pld	W	D	L	GF	GA	GD	Pts	Qualification or relegation
1	Sofapaka (C, Q)	30	16	11	3	39	21	+18	59	Qualification for 2010 CAF Champions League
2	Mathare United	30	15	8	7	39	23	+16	53	
3	Thika United	34	13	12	9	31	19	+12	51	
4	Tusker	30	14	6	10	47	30	+17	48	
5	Gor Mahia	30	15	1	14	39	33	+6	46	
6	Nairobi City Stars	30	11	10	9	30	29	+1	43	
7	Karuturi Sports	30	9	13	8	19	17	+2	40	
8	Chemelil Sugar	30	10	10	10	28	28	0	40	
9	SoNy Sugar	30	11	7	12	29	31	−2	40	
10	Ulinzi Stars	30	8	15	7	24	26	−2	39	
11	Western Stima	30	8	12	10	29	38	−9	36	
12	Kenya Commercial Bank	30	8	10	12	32	39	−7	34	
13	A.F.C. Leopards (Q)	30	8	10	12	28	36	−8	34	Qualification for 2010 CAF Confederation Cup (Note: A.F.C. Leopards as winners of the 2009 FKL Cup qualified for the 2010 CAF Confederation Cup.)
14	Red Berets	30	7	9	14	28	43	−15	30	
15	Bandari (R)	30	7	8	15	25	41	−16	29	Relegation to 2010 Nationwide League
16	Agrochemical (R)	30	5	8	17	20	43	−23	23	Relegation to 2010 Nationwide League

Updated to match(es) played on 21 November 2009. Source: 2009 Kenyan Premier League
Rules for classification: 1) points; 2) goal difference; 3) number of goals scored.
(C) Champions; (Q) Qualified for the phase indicated; (R) Relegated

=== Relegation ===
The two last teams, Bandari and Agrochemical, were relegated to the Nationwide League for the following season.

=== Awards ===
The end of season awards were held on 9 December 2009.

Award	Recipient	Club
Player of the Year	John Baraza	Sofapaka
New Player of the Year	George Odhiambo	Gor Mahia
Golden Boot	John Baraza	Sofapaka
Golden Boot	Joseph Emeka	Tusker
Goalkeeper of the Year	Wilson Oburu	Sofapaka
Defender of the Year	Edgar Ochieng	Sofapaka
Midfielder of the Year	Peter Opiyo	Gor Mahia
Manager of the Year	Benson Mutinda	Sofapaka
Coach of the Year	Robert Matano	Sofapaka
Fair Play Player of the Year	Dennis Okoth	Nairobi City Stars
Fair Play Team of the Year	Sony Sugar	
Special Award	Joe Kadenge	

== Nationwide League ==
In 2008, the Nationwide League was divided into 2 zones of 16 teams each. In 2009, the league was restructured to contain two levels: Division One and Division Two, representing the second and third levels of the Kenyan football league system. Division One had 16 teams and Division Two had 2 zones.

=== Teams ===
The following 16 teams participated Division One.

Team name	Town
AC Nakuru	Nakuru
Administration Police	Nairobi
Bidco United	Thika
Compel	Webuye
Dagoretti Green Santos	Nairobi
Homegrown	Naivasha
Kawangware	Nairobi
Kenya Revenue Authority	Nairobi
Magongo Rangers	Mombasa
Mahakama	Nairobi
Mathare Youth	Nairobi
Nairobi Stima	Nairobi
Opera FC	Sultan Hamud
Posta Rangers	Nairobi
Real Kisumu	Kisumu
Strathmore University	Nairobi

=== Promotion ===
The top two teams, Mahakama and Posta Rangers, were promoted to the Premier League for the following season.

== FKL Cup ==
The KFF Cup had its name changed to the FKL Cup, in line with the takeover of Kenyan football by Football Kenya Limited.

Though most Premier League clubs boycotted the cup, A.F.C. Leopards beat Congo JMJ United 4-1 in the final on 20 October at the Nairobi City Stadium.

== Super Cup ==
The 2009 Kenyan Super Cup match was played on January 24, 2009 between Mathare United, the 2008 Kenyan Premier League winners, and Gor Mahia, who set a record for the most KFF Cup titles ever won by winning their ninth title that same year. Gor Mahia won 3−0 at full-time.

24 January 2009	Mathare United	0–3	Gor Mahia	Moi International Sports Centre, Nairobi
15:00 UTC+3		News	H. Otieno 14', 46'; Gemet (?)	Attendance: 30,000

== National team ==
Head coach Francis Kimanzi was sacked after the 2008 CECAFA Cup in January 2009 due to disputes between him and Kenyan football administrators. Kimanzi was replaced on caretaker basis by Bobby Ogolla, before Antoine Hey was appointed to coach Kenya in the World Cup Qualifiers. The latter resigned in November 2009, shortly before Kenya met Nigeria in their last World Cup qualifier match. Hey was replaced by Twahir Muhiddin.

=== World Cup qualifiers – CAF third round (Group 2) ===
Kenya participated in the 2010 World Cup qualifiers third qualifying round, which also doubled as the 2010 African Cup of Nations qualifiers. Kenya finished last in its qualifying group winning only one match and missed both tournaments.

Team	Pld	W	D	L	GF	GA	GD	Pts	Qualification	(Nigeria)	(Tunisia)	(Mozambique)	(Kenya)
Nigeria	6	3	3	0	9	4	+5	12	Qualified for the 2010 FIFA World Cup and 2010 Africa Cup of Nations	—	2–2	1–0	3–0
Tunisia	6	3	2	1	7	4	+3	11	Qualified for the 2010 Africa Cup of Nations	0–0	—	2–0	1–0
Mozambique	6	2	1	3	3	5	−2	7	Qualified for the 2010 Africa Cup of Nations	0–0	1–0	—	1–0
Kenya	6	1	0	5	5	11	−6	3		2–3	1–2	2–1	—

28 March 2009	Kenya	1–2	Tunisia	Nyayo National Stadium, Nairobi
16:00 UTC+3	Oliech 70'	Report	Jemal 6'; Jemâa 79'	Attendance: 27,000; Referee: Divine Evehe (Cameroon)

7 June 2009	Nigeria	3–0	Kenya	Abuja Stadium, Abuja
17:00 UTC+1	I. Uche 2'; Obinna 72' (pen.), 77'	Report		Attendance: 60,000; Referee: Abdellah El Achiri (Morocco)

20 June 2009	Kenya	2–1	Mozambique	Kasarani Sports Complex, Nairobi
16:00 UTC+3	J. Owino 8'; Mariga 72' (pen.)	Report	Dominguês 49'	Attendance: 15,000; Referee: Yakhouba Keita (Guinea)

6 September 2009	Mozambique	1–0	Kenya	Estádio da Machava, Maputo
15:00 UTC+2	Tico-Tico 66'	Report		Attendance: 35,000; Referee: Koman Coulibaly (Mali)

11 October 2009	Tunisia	1–0	Kenya	Stade 7 November, Radès
17:00 UTC+1	Jemâa 1'	Report		Attendance: 50,000; Referee: Badara Diatta (Senegal)

14 November 2009	Kenya	2–3	Nigeria	Nyayo National Stadium, Nairobi
16:00 UTC+3	Oliech 15'; Wanga 77'	Report	Martins 60' 81'; Yakubu 64'	Attendance: 20,000; Referee: Eddy Maillet (Seychelles)

=== CECAFA Cup ===
==== 2008 CECAFA Cup ====
Due to postponement, the 2008 CECAFA Cup continued into 2009. Kenya played their 3 remaining group stage matches, the semi-finals and the final, which they lost to Uganda. Francis Kimanzi was sacked as the head coach shortly after the end of the tournament due to disagreements with the Kenya Football Federation.

===== Group stage =====
Team	Pld	W	D	L	GF	GA	GD	Pts
Kenya	4	2	2	0	6	1	+5	8
Burundi	4	2	1	1	6	2	+4	7
Sudan	4	1	2	1	3	2	+1	5
Zambia	4	1	2	1	4	3	+1	5
Djibouti	4	0	1	3	2	13	−11	1

January 2, 2009	Kenya	0 - 0	Zambia	Bugembe Stadium, Jinja

January 6, 2009	Djibouti	1 - 5	Kenya	Bugembe Stadium, Jinja
	Daher 60'		Ouma 4', 15', 90+3'; Shikokoti 47'; Owino 90+2'

January 8, 2009	Burundi	0 - 1	Kenya	Nakivubo Stadium, Kampala
			Monday 60' (pen.)

===== Semi-finals =====
January 11, 2009	Kenya	2 - 1	Tanzania	National Stadium, Kampala
	Ouma 18'; M. Baraza 21'		Mrwanda 79'

===== Final =====
January 13, 2009	Kenya	0 - 1	Uganda	National Stadium, Kampala
			Omwony 16'

==== 2009 CECAFA Cup ====
Kenya hosted the 2009 CECAFA Cup, but lost to the eventual tournament winners Uganda 1-0 in the quarter finals.

===== Group stage =====
Team	Pld	W	D	L	GF	GA	GD	Pts
Zambia	3	3	0	0	9	0	+9	9
Kenya	3	2	0	1	4	2	+2	6
Ethiopia	3	1	0	2	5	3	+2	3
Djibouti	3	0	0	3	0	13	−13	0

28 November 2009	Zambia	2–0	Kenya	Nyayo National Stadium, Nairobi
16:00 UTC+3	Chamanga 86', 89'

2 December 2009	Kenya	2–0	Djibouti	Nyayo National Stadium, Nairobi
16:00 UTC+3	Odhiambo 23'; Wanga 44'

5 December 2009	Ethiopia	0–2	Kenya	Nyayo National Stadium, Nairobi
16:00 UTC+3			Baraza 2'; Wanga 52'

===== Quarter-finals =====
7 December 2009	Uganda	1–0	Kenya	Nyayo National Stadium, Nairobi
16:00 UTC+3	Ssentongo 64'

=== Other matches ===
The following is a list of all other matches played by Kenya in 2009.

2 January 2009 International friendly	Zambia	0–0	Kenya	Jinja, Uganda
		Report

6 January 2009 International friendly	Djibouti	1–5	Kenya	Jinja, Uganda
		Report

6 January 2009 International friendly	Burundi	0–1	Kenya	Kampala, Uganda
		Report

11 January 2009 International friendly	Kenya	2–1	Tanzania	Kampala, Uganda
		Report

13 January 2009 International friendly	Kenya	0–1	Uganda	Kampala, Uganda
		Report

23 January 2009 International friendly	Egypt	1–0	Kenya	Cairo, Egypt
		Report

14 March 2009 International friendly	Iran	1–0	Kenya	Tehran, Iran
		Report

12 August 2009 International friendly	Malaysia	0–0	Kenya	Kuala Lumpur, Malaysia
		Report

26 August 2009 International friendly	Bahrain	2–1	Kenya	Manama, Bahrain
		Report

3 November 2009 International friendly	Kuwait	5–0	Kenya	Cairo, Egypt
		Report
