= 2011 in Kenyan football =

Football in Kenya
- Season: 2011

Men's football
- Premier League: Tusker
- Nationwide League: Oserian (FKL); Muhoroni Youth (KFF)
- FKL Cup: Gor Mahia
- Top 8 Cup: Ulinzi Stars
- Super Cup: Sofapaka

The following article is a summary of the 2011 football season in Kenya, the 48th competitive season in its history.

== Domestic leagues ==
=== Promotion and relegation ===
Promoted to Premier League

- Bandari
- Congo JMJ United

Relegated from Premier League

- Mahakama
- Red Berets

=== Premier League ===
The 2011 Kenyan Premier League began on 26 February 2011 and ended on 26 November 2011.

Pos	Team	Pld	W	D	L	GF	GA	GD	Pts	Qualification or relegation
1	Tusker (C, Q)	30	17	7	6	34	17	+17	58	Qualification for 2012 CAF Champions League
2	Ulinzi Stars	30	16	9	5	38	20	+18	57	
3	Sofapaka	30	15	7	8	42	23	+19	52	
4	Gor Mahia (Q)	30	12	12	6	27	22	+5	48	Qualification for 2012 CAF Confederation Cup (Note: Gor Mahia as winners of the 2011 FKL Cup qualified for the 2012 CAF Confederation Cup.)
5	A.F.C. Leopards	30	13	7	10	36	27	+9	46	
6	SoNy Sugar	30	13	5	12	33	33	0	44	
7	Rangers	30	11	10	9	33	31	+2	43	
8	Chemelil Sugar	30	10	11	9	30	27	+3	41	
9	Kenya Commercial Bank	30	11	7	12	38	32	+6	40	
10	Thika United	30	11	6	13	36	39	−3	39	
11	Western Stima	30	9	10	11	21	28	−7	37	
12	Mathare United	30	7	13	10	32	35	−3	34	
13	Karuturi Sports	30	8	10	12	20	28	−8	34	
14	Nairobi City Stars	30	8	7	15	28	35	−7	31	
15	Bandari (R)	30	9	4	17	22	39	−17	31	Relegation to 2012 FKF Division One
16	Congo JMJ United (R)	30	5	5	20	18	52	−34	20	Relegation to 2012 FKF Division One

Updated to match(es) played on 16 December 2011. Source: 2011 Kenyan Premier League
Rules for classification: 1) points; 2) goal difference; 3) number of goals scored.
(C) Champions; (Q) Qualified for the phase indicated; (R) Relegated

=== Nationwide League ===
The 2011 Kenyan Nationwide League began on 13 March 2011 and ended on 27 November 2011.

Muhoroni Youth's promotion was heavily questioned, as the KFF Nationwide League season was inconclusive. Former KFF chairman Mohamed Hatimy said that Muhoroni Youth's promotion was unconstitutional as the league they played in was "unknown" and that there was only one Nationwide League; that run by the FKL and any promoted teams should have come from the FKL Nationwide League.

==== FKL Nationwide League ====
Pos	Team	Pld	W	D	L	GF	GA	GD	Pts	Promotion or relegation
1	Oserian (C, P)	30	13	12	5	49	34	+15	51	Promotion to 2012 Kenyan Premier League
2	Mahakama	30	14	7	9	46	31	+15	49	
3	Agrochemical	30	13	10	7	32	23	+9	49	
4	Nairobi Stima	30	11	15	4	32	23	+9	48	
5	Kenya Revenue Authority	30	12	11	7	47	35	+12	47	
6	Magongo Rangers	30	13	6	11	36	43	−7	45	
7	Admiral	30	11	11	8	40	37	+3	44	
8	Finlays Horticulture	30	10	12	8	29	30	−1	42	
9	Administration Police	30	11	8	11	34	34	0	41	
10	Nakuru AllStars	30	10	9	11	35	32	+3	39	
11	Bidco United	30	8	14	8	36	30	+6	38	
12	Gusii United	30	9	10	11	39	38	+1	37	
13	Mathare Youth	30	6	12	12	37	39	−2	30	Relegation to 2012 Kenyan Provincial League (Note: Mathare Youth were to be relegated to Division Two, but due to a lack of enough teams in Zone A of FKF Division One, they were added to complete the list of 20 teams.)
14	Strathmore University (R)	30	6	9	15	38	53	−15	27	Relegation to 2012 Kenyan Provincial League
15	Real Kisumu (R)	30	5	12	13	27	42	−15	27	Relegation to 2012 Kenyan Provincial League
16	KSL Thola Glass (R)	30	6	6	18	20	53	−33	24	Relegation to 2012 Kenyan Provincial League

Updated to match(es) played on 27 November 2011. Source: FKL Nationwide One
Rules for classification: 1) points; 2) goal difference; 3) number of goals scored.
(C) Champions; (P) Promoted; (R) Relegated

==== KFF Nationwide League ====
Pos	Team	Pld	W	D	L	GF	GA	GD	Pts	Promotion or relegation
1	Muhoroni Youth (C, P)	30	23	5	2	51	21	+30	74	Promotion to 2012 Kenyan Premier League (Note: Muhoroni Youth were promoted to the Premier League under controversial circumstances as the season was inconclusive.)
2	Ligi Ndogo	30	22	4	4	59	18	+41	70	
3	Kariobangi Sharks	28	19	6	3	53	19	+34	63	
4	KSL Thola Glass	29	18	3	8	56	26	+30	57	
5	Iron Strikers	30	14	8	8	50	29	+21	50	
6	Milimani	27	13	3	11	32	31	+1	42	
7	Kenya Meat Commission	28	13	0	15	23	40	−17	39	
8	Karungu	28	11	5	12	27	29	−2	38	
9	Don Bosco	30	11	8	11	34	34	0	41	
10	Utawala	29	12	2	15	37	37	0	38	
11	Yanga	29	9	5	15	29	37	−8	32	
12	Lugulu Stars	29	9	3	17	23	31	−8	30	
13	Makarios (R)	28	9	2	17	21	45	−24	29	Relegation to 2012 Kenyan Provincial League (Note: Relegation of teams in the league this season was done under controversial circumstances as the season was inconclusive.)
14	Nanyuki (R)	29	7	4	18	26	52	−26	25	Relegation to 2012 Kenyan Provincial League
15	Annex 07 (R)	29	7	1	21	20	51	−31	22	Relegation to 2012 Kenyan Provincial League
16	Kiambaa United (R)	30	4	2	24	13	50	−37	14	Relegation to 2012 Kenyan Provincial League

Source: KFF Nationwide One
Rules for classification: 1) points; 2) goal difference; 3) number of goals scored.
(C) Champions; (P) Promoted; (R) Relegated

== Domestic cups ==
=== FKL Cup ===
Gor Mahia defeated previous winners Sofapaka 1–0 in the final for their ninth ever title.

=== Super Cup ===
The 2011 Kenyan Super Cup match was played on 20 February 2011 between Ulinzi Stars, the 2010 Kenyan Premier League winners, and Sofapaka, the 2010 FKL Cup champions. The latter won 1–0 at full-time.

5 February 2012	Ulinzi Stars	0–1	Sofapaka	Nyayo National Stadium, Nairobi
15:00 EAT		News	Baraza 13'	Attendance: 30,000

=== Top 8 Cup ===
The 2011 KPL Top 8 Cup began on 9 March 2011 and ended on 25 June 2011, with Ulinzi Stars beating Western Stima 2–1 in the final.

Quarterfinals
Mathare United	0
Gor Mahia	2
Ulinzi Stars	2
Karuturi Sports	0
Tusker	0
Western Stima	1
Sofapaka	2
Sony Sugar	1

Semifinals
Gor Mahia	0	0	0
Ulinzi Stars	0	1	1
Western Stima	1	2	3 (2)
Sofapaka	1	2	3 (1)

Finals
Ulinzi Stars	2
Western Stima	1

== International club competitions ==
=== Champions League ===
The 2011 CAF Champions League began on 28 January 2011 and concluded on 13 November 2011. Ulinzi Stars qualified for participation in the tournament as 2010 Kenyan Premier League champions. They were beaten on aggregate in the preliminary round by Zamalek, who advanced to the first round.

29 January 2011 Preliminaries	Ulinzi Stars (Kenya)	0–4	(Egypt) Zamalek	Nyayo National Stadium, Nairobi
16:00 UTC+03:00		Report	Fathalla 61' (pen.); Mostafa 69'; Aoudia 76'; Salah 90+1'

27 February 2011 Preliminaries	Zamalek (Egypt)	1–0	(Kenya) Ulinzi Stars	Cairo Military Academy Stadium, Cairo
17:30 UTC+02:00	Shikabala 58'	Report

=== Confederation Cup ===
The 2011 CAF Confederation Cup began on 28 January 2011 and concluded on 4 December 2011. Sofapaka qualified for participation in the tournament as 2010 FKL Cup champions. They defeated AS Aviação on aggregate in the preliminary round and advanced to the first round, where they defeated Ismaily on aggregate to advance to the second round. There they beat Saint Eloi Lupopo on away goals rule to progress into the play-off round, in which they were defeated by Club Africain on aggregate and failed to advance to the group stage.

30 January 2011 Preliminaries	AS Aviação (Angola)	0–0	(Kenya) Sofapaka	Estádio 11 de Novembro. Luanda
15:30 UTC+01:00

13 February 2011 Preliminaries	Sofapaka (Kenya)	0–0 (5–4 p)	(Angola) AS Aviação	Nyayo National Stadium, Nairobi
16:00 UTC+03:00		Report

18 March 2011 first round	Ismaily (Egypt)	2–0	(Kenya) Sofapaka	Ismailia Stadium, Ismailia
16:30 UTC+02:00	Abougrisha 10'; Hosny 15'	Report

2 April 2011 first round	Sofapaka (Kenya)	4–0	(Egypt) Ismaily	Nyayo National Stadium, Nairobi
17:00 UTC+03:00	Kimani 26'; Mugalia 32'; Mulama 37'; Kagogo 90+5'	Report

24 April 2011 second round	Saint Eloi Lupopo (Democratic Republic of the Congo)	2–1	(Kenya) Sofapaka	Stade Frederic Kibassa Maliba, Lubumbashi
15:30 UTC+02:00	Ziyunga 21'; Kalamba 41'	Report	Mieno 89'

8 May 2011 second round	Sofapaka (Kenya)	1–0	(Democratic Republic of the Congo) Saint Eloi Lupopo	Nyayo National Stadium, Nairobi
16:00 UTC+03:00	Baraza 89'	Report

29 May 2011 Play-off round	Club Africain (Tunisia)	3–0	(Kenya) Sofapaka	Stade El Menzah, Tunis
19:00 UTC+01:00	Melliti 4', 48'; Messadi 79' (pen.)	Report

12 June 2011 Play-off round	Sofapaka (Kenya)	3–1	(Tunisia) Club Africain	Nyayo National Stadium, Nairobi
15:00 UTC+03:00	Kayombo 41'; Baraza 74'; Onami 84'	Report	Ndouassel 22'

=== Kagame Interclub Cup ===
The 2011 Kagame Interclub Cup began on 25 June 2011 and ended on 10 July 2011. Ulinzi Stars were invited to represent Kenya in the tournament as 2010 Kenyan Premier League champions. They advanced through the group stage but were knocked out in the quarter-finals by Al-Merreikh.

Group C
Team	Pld	W	D	L	GF	GA	GD	Pts
(Ethiopia) Saint-George SA	3	2	1	0	11	2	+9	7
(Kenya) Ulinzi Stars	3	1	2	0	10	1	+9	5
(Rwanda) APR FC	3	1	1	1	5	3	+2	4
(Djibouti) Ports	3	0	0	3	0	20	−20	0

28 June 2011 Group stage	Ulinzi Stars (Kenya)	1–1	(Ethiopia) Saint-George SA

30 June 2011 Group stage	Port (Djibouti)	0–9	(Kenya) Ulinzi Stars

2 July 2011 Group stage	Ulinzi Stars (Kenya)	0–0	(Rwanda) Armée Patriotique Rwandaise

5 July 2011 Quarter-finals	Al-Merreikh (Sudan)	1–1 (9–8 p)	(Kenya) Ulinzi Stars

== National team ==
=== World Cup qualification ===
The national team participated in the first round of World Cup qualifications in Africa. They beat Seychelles 7–0 on aggregate to advance to the second round.

11 November 2011	Seychelles	0–3	Kenya	Stade Linité, Victoria
17:00 UTC+4		Report	Ochieng 41'; Origi (yellow card) 61'; Oliech 75', 81'	Attendance: 2,000; Referee: Dennis Batte (Uganda)

15 November 2011	Kenya	4–0	Seychelles	Nyayo National Stadium, Nairobi
16:00 UTC+3	Mandela 19'; Oliech 36'; Mulama 45+1'; Wanyama 74'	Report		Attendance: 5,000; Referee: Victor Gomes (South Africa)

=== Africa Cup of Nations qualification ===
The national team participated in the qualification phase of the 2012 Africa Cup of Nations. They finished third in their group and missed out on the final tournament.

Team	Pld	W	D	L	GF	GA	GD	Pts	ANG	UGA	KEN	GNB
Angola	6	4	0	2	7	5	+2	12		2–0	1–0	1–0
Uganda	6	3	2	1	6	2	+4	11	3–0		0–0	2–0
Kenya	6	2	2	2	4	4	0	8	2–1	0–0		2–1
Guinea-Bissau	6	1	0	5	2	8	−6	3	0–2	0–1	1–0	

Legend: Blue = home team win; Yellow = draw; Red = away team win.

26 March 2011	Kenya	2–1	Angola	Kasarani Stadium, Nairobi
16:00 UTC+3	Mohammed 57'; Mariga 90+1'	Report	Manucho 19'

5 June 2011	Angola	1–0	Kenya	Estádio 11 de Novembro, Luanda
15:30 UTC+1	Manucho 71'	Report

3 September 2011	Kenya	2–1	Guinea-Bissau	Kasarani Stadium, Nairobi
16:00 UTC+3	M. Baraza 58'; Oliech 90'	Report	de Carvalho 86'

8 October 2011	Uganda	0–0	Kenya	Mandela National Stadium, Kampala
17:00 UTC+3		Report

=== CECAFA Cup ===
The team participated in the 2011 CECAFA Cup held in Dar es Salaam, Tanzania. They finished third in their group, but, though having the same points as Tanzania, were knocked out on goal difference through the comparison of third-placed teams in the group stage.

Group C
Team	Pld	W	D	L	GF	GA	GD	Pts
Malawi	3	1	2	0	3	1	+2	5
Sudan	3	1	2	0	2	1	+1	5
Kenya	3	1	0	2	2	3	−1	3
Ethiopia	3	0	2	1	2	4	−2	2

28 November 2011	Kenya	0–2	Malawi	Benjamin Mkapa National Stadium, Dar es Salaam
16:00		Report	Banda 23'; Kamwendo 66' (pen.)

30 November 2011	Ethiopia	0–2	Kenya	Benjamin Mkapa National Stadium, Dar es Salaam
14:00		Report	Mugalia 13'; V. Ochieng 44'

3 December 2011	Kenya	0–1	Sudan	Benjamin Mkapa National Stadium, Dar es Salaam
14:00		Report	Koko 25'

=== Nile Basin tournament ===
Kenya took part in the 2011 Nile Basin Tournament, organised by the Egyptian Football Association. The team finished second in its group and advanced to the quarter-finals, where they were beaten 5–1 by Egypt, and later 1–0 by Congo DR in the third place playoff.

==== Group stage ====
Team	Pld	W	D	L	GF	GA	GD	Pts
DR Congo	2	2	0	0	3	1	+2	6
Kenya	2	1	0	1	1	1	0	3
Sudan	2	0	0	2	1	3	−2	0

5 January 2011	Kenya	1–0	Sudan	Cairo, Egypt
	C. Okoth 17' (pen.)	Report		Stadium: Osman Ahmed Osman Stadium

8 January 2011	Kenya	0–1	DR Congo	Cairo, Egypt
		Report	Lofo 27' (pen.)	Stadium: Al-Shorta Stadium

==== Quarter-finals ====
14 January 2011	Egypt	5–1	Kenya	Cairo, Egypt
	Belal 13', 69', 90'; Hamdy 21'; Gomaa 25'	Report	Opondo 67'	Stadium: Al Shorta Stadium

==== Third place playoff ====
17 January 2011	DR Congo	1–0	Kenya	Cairo, Egypt
	Kasongo 31'	Report		Stadium: Osman Ahmed Osman Stadium

=== Other matches ===
The following is a list of all other matches played by Kenya in 2011.

9 February 2011 International friendly	South Africa	2–0	Kenya	Rustenburg, South Africa
	Somma 2'; Pienaar 45'	Report; Report		Stadium: Royal Bafokeng Stadium

29 March 2011 International friendly	Nigeria	3–0	Kenya	Abuja, Nigeria
		Report		Stadium: Abuja National Stadium

25 June 2011 International friendly	Kenya	1–2	Sudan	Nairobi, Kenya
		Report		Stadium: Nyayo National Stadium

10 August 2011 International friendly	Botswana	1–0	Kenya	Gaborone, Botswana
	Moatlhaping 80' (pen.)	Report		Stadium: University of Botswana Stadium

1 October 2011 International friendly	Kenya	Cancelled	Botswana	Nairobi, Kenya
				Stadium: Nyayo National Stadium
