= List of football clubs in Kenya =

This is a list of association football clubs located in Kenya. For a complete list, see Category:Football clubs in Kenya

== Active teams ==
=== A ===
- Administration Police F.C.
- Admiral F.C.
- A.F.C. Leopards
- Agrochemical F.C.
- Ascend F.C.

=== B ===
- Bandari F.C. (Kenya)
- Bacca F.C. (Kenya)
- Bidco United F.C.
- Black stars F.C

=== C ===
- Chemelil Sugar F.C.
- Coast Stars F.C.
- Chania 237 F.Cf

=== D ===
- Dagoretti Santos

=== F ===
- Finlays Horticulture A.F.C.

Ligi ndogo

=== G ===
- G.F.C. 105
- Gor Mahia F.C.
- Gusii Shabana F.C.
- Githurai sharks F.C

=== H ===
- Homegrown F.C.

=== I ===
- Iron Strikers F.C.
- ipc Roysambu F.C.
- Isebania F.C.

=== K ===
- Kariobangi Sharks
- Kakamega Homeboyz F.C.
- Kangemi United F.C.
- Karuturi Sports
- Kenya Commercial Bank S.C.
- Kenya Pipeline F.C.
- Kisumu All Stars F.C.
- Kenya School of Law
- Kea Green Stars F.C.
- Kibera A2Z F.C

=== L ===
- Ligi Ndogo S.C.
- Liberal sports academy
- Lake view Football Club

=== M ===
- Mahakama F.C.
- Mathare United F.C.
- Mathare Youth F.C.
- Meru City FC
- Ministry of Sports, Culture and the Arts
- Modern Coast Rangers F.C.
- Mombasa Sports Club
- Muhoroni Youth F.C.
- Mombasa Hamlets F.C
- Mombasa Eagles Football Club
- MUSOKOTO FC.

=== N ===
- Nairobi City Stars
- Nairobi Stima F.C.
- Nakumatt F.C.
- Nakuru Top Fry AllStars
- Nzoia United F.C.
- NYSA Africa fc

=== O ===
- Oserian F.C.

=== P ===
- Posta Rangers F.C.

=== R ===
- Real Kisumu F.C.
- Red Berets F.C.
- Reunion F.C.
- Rift Valley United F.C.
- Raymond F.C.

=== S ===
- Sofapaka F.C.
- Sony Sugar F.C.
- St. Joseph F.C.
- Sunderland AFC Keroche
- SHOFCO UNITED Kibera
- Shabana FC
- Soka Ndogo fc

=== T ===
- Talanta
- Thika United F.C.
- Timsales F.C.
- Tusker F.C.
- Thika Sporting club

=== U ===
- Ulinzi Stars F.C.
- Utawala F.C.
- Sindo United

=== W ===
- Wazito F.C.
- West Kenya Sugar F.C.
- Western Stima F.C.
- West Ham

=== Y ===
- Yanga F.C.

=== Z ===
- Zoo Kericho F.C.
- Zaka Sports Club

== Women's clubs ==
- Vihiga Queens FC
- Thika Queens FC
- Liberal sports queens

== Defunct teams ==
=== F ===
- Feisal F.C.

=== M ===
- Mumias Sugar F.C.

=== N ===
- Nakuru AllStars (1961)
- Nairobi Heroes F.C.

=== R ===
- Rivatex F.C.

=== U ===
- Utalii
