= 2008 in Kenyan football =

Football in Kenya
- Season: 2008

Men's football
- Premier League: Mathare United
- Nationwide League: A.F.C. Leopards (Zone A); Sofapaka (Zone B)
- KFF Cup: Gor Mahia

The following article is a summary of the 2008 football season in Kenya, the 45th competitive season in its history.

== Premier League ==
The Premier League was sponsored by South African television channel SuperSport, meaning that it was broadcast live on TV after several years and offered financial benefits. Francis Ouma, with 15 goals, finished as the top scorer.

16 teams took part and Mathare United won its first league title. The season concluded on November 22, 2008.

Pos	Team	Pld	W	D	L	GF	GA	GD	Pts	Qualification or relegation
1	Mathare United (C, Q)	30	18	9	3	47	22	+25	63	Qualification for 2009 CAF Champions League
2	Sony Sugar	30	17	9	4	34	17	+17	60	
3	Agrochemical	30	13	9	8	28	24	+4	48	
4	Ulinzi Stars	30	12	9	9	30	25	+5	45	
5	Thika United	30	11	10	9	23	20	+3	43	
6	Chemelil Sugar	30	10	10	10	28	22	+6	40	
7	World Hope	30	11	7	12	25	31	−6	40	
8	Tusker	30	9	12	9	36	36	0	39	
9	Gor Mahia	30	10	9	11	20	23	−3	39	Qualification for 2009 CAF Confederation Cup (Note: Gor Mahia as winners of the 2008 FKL Cup qualified for the 2009 CAF Confederation Cup.)
10	Sher Karuturi	30	8	14	8	17	19	−2	38	
11	Kenya Commercial Bank	30	8	12	10	23	27	−4	36	
12	Red Berets	30	8	9	13	26	31	−5	33	
13	Bandari	30	9	6	15	28	36	−8	33	
14	Western Stima	30	9	6	15	32	41	−9	33	
15	Mahakama (R)	30	8	8	14	27	34	−7	32	Relegation to 2009 Nationwide League
16	Mathare Youth (R)	30	6	7	17	27	43	−16	25	Relegation to 2009 Nationwide League

Updated to match(es) played on 22 November 2008. Source:
Rules for classification: 1) points; 2) goal difference; 3) number of goals scored.
(C) Champions; (Q) Qualified for the phase indicated; (R) Relegated

=== Relegation ===
Mahakama and Mathare Youth were relegated from the league and were replaced by Nationwide League champions A.F.C. Leopards and Sofapaka, who were top in Zone A and Zone B respectively.

== Nationwide League ==
The Nationwide League was played in 2 zones. Zonal winners were A.F.C. Leopards and Sofapaka, who gained promotion for the following season.

=== Zone A ===
Team name	Town
AC Nakuru	Nakuru
AFC Leopards	Nairobi
Compel FC	Webuye
Eldoret Mahakama	Eldoret
Fluorspar FC	Keiyo
Homegrown FC	Naivasha
Kisumu Black Stars	Kisumu
Laikipia Campus	Nyahururu
Longonot Horticulture	Longonot
Minicus	Nairobi
Muhoroni Youth	Muhoroni
Nairobi Stima	Nairobi
Oserian	Naivasha
Real Kisumu	Kisumu
St. Andrews FC	Molo
Strathmore University FC	Nairobi

=== Zone B ===
Team name	Town
Administration Police FC	Nairobi
Bidco United	Thika
Dagoretti Santos	Nairobi
Gachui Black Boots	Gachui
Green Berets FC	Ruiru
Kangemi United	Nairobi
Kawangware	Nairobi
Kenya Revenue Authority FC	Nairobi
Kenyatta National Hospital FC	Nairobi
Magongo Rangers	Mombasa
Malindi United	Malindi
Opera FC	Sultan Hamud
Re-Union	Nairobi
Sofapaka	Nairobi
Super Eagles FC	Mombasa
Vegpro	Nairobi

Coast Stars from Mombasa were relegated from the Premier League in 2007, but refused to join the Nationwide League. They were replaced by Malindi United. Shalimar of Naivasha were to compete in Zone A and had already played some games before pulling out of the league. They were replaced by Kisumu Black Stars which joined when the league was halfway done.

== KFF Cup ==
The President's Cup was renamed to the KFF Cup. The tournament was won by Gor Mahia, who beat Provincial League side Posta Rangers in the final. Apart from Gor Mahia, all other Premier League teams skipped the tournament due to high costs.

== National team ==
=== World Cup qualifiers – CAF second round (group 2) ===
The national team played in the 2010 World Cup qualifiers and reached the 3rd qualifying round. The qualifiers also doubled as the 2010 African Cup of Nations qualifiers.

Team	Pld	W	D	L	GF	GA	GD	Pts	Qualification	(Guinea)	(Kenya)	(Zimbabwe)	(Namibia)
Guinea	6	3	2	1	9	5	+4	11	Advance to third round	—	3–2	0–0	4–0
Kenya	6	3	1	2	8	5	+3	10	Advance to third round	2–0	—	2–0	1–0
Zimbabwe	6	1	3	2	4	6	−2	6		0–0	0–0	—	2–0
Namibia	6	2	0	4	7	12	−5	6		1–2	2–1	4–2	—

May 31, 2008	Namibia	2 – 1	Kenya	Sam Nujoma Stadium, Windhoek
16:00 UTC+1	Risser 17'; Khaiseb 89'	Report	Wanga 40'	Attendance: 6,000; Referee: Muhmed Ssegonga (Uganda)

June 7, 2008	Kenya	2 – 0	Guinea	Nyayo National Stadium, Nairobi
16:00 UTC+3	Oliech 3' 50'	Report		Attendance: 35,000; Referee: Lambert Eyene (Cameroon)

June 14, 2008	Kenya	2 – 0	Zimbabwe	Nyayo National Stadium, Nairobi
16:00 UTC+3	Mariga 12'; Oliech 85'	Report		Attendance: 27,500; Referee: Badara Diatta (Senegal)

June 22, 2008	Zimbabwe	0 – 0	Kenya	Rufaro Stadium, Harare
15:00 UTC+2		Report		Attendance: 23,000; Referee: Alex Kotey (Ghana)

September 6, 2008	Kenya	1 – 0	Namibia	Moi International Sports Centre, Nairobi
16:00 UTC+3	Jamal 44' (pen.)	Report		Attendance: 40,000; Referee: Jean-Marie Hicuburundi (Burundi)

October 12, 2008	Guinea	3 – 2	Kenya	Stade 28 Septembre, Conakry
16:15 UTC+0	Bangoura 32'; Bah 61'; Zayatte 71'	Report	Ouma 81'; Opondo 90+3'	Attendance: 16,400; Referee: Eddy Maillet (Seychelles)

=== 2008 CECAFA Cup ===
Kenya took part in the 2008 CECAFA Cup, which continued into 2009 due to postponements. They reached the final but were beaten 1–0 by Uganda. Shortly after the end of the tournament, Francis Kimanzi was sacked as the head coach due to disagreements with the Kenya Football Federation.

==== Group stage ====
Team	Pld	W	D	L	GF	GA	GD	Pts
Kenya	4	2	2	0	6	1	+5	8
Burundi	4	2	1	1	6	2	+4	7
Sudan	4	1	2	1	3	2	+1	5
Zambia	4	1	2	1	4	3	+1	5
Djibouti	4	0	1	3	2	13	−11	1

December 31, 2008	Sudan	0 - 0	Kenya	Bugembe Stadium, Jinja

=== Other matches ===
There were no other matches played by Kenya in 2008.
