= 2013 in Kenyan football =

Football in Kenya
- Season: 2013

Men's football
- Premier League: Gor Mahia
- Division One: K.R.A. (Zone A); Top Fry AllStars (Zone B)
- President's Cup: A.F.C. Leopards
- Top 8 Cup: Tusker
- Super Cup: Gor Mahia (pre-season); Tusker (post-season)

The following article is a summary of the 2013 football season in Kenya, which is the Golden Jubilee (50th) competitive season in its history.

== Domestic leagues ==
=== Changes in the football league system ===
On 10 July, it was announced that the Football Kenya Federation introduced a new league system to take effect from the beginning of the 2014 season. This involved the introduction and scrapping of a few leagues, and the re-organisation of the system.

Level	League/Division(s)							
1 Premier League	Premier League; 16 clubs							
2 Super League	National Super League; 22 clubs							
3 Division One	Western Zone; 20 clubs				Eastern Zone; 20 clubs			
4 Provincial Leagues	Nyanza League; 20 clubs	Western League; 20 clubs	Rift Valley League; 20 clubs	Central League; 20 clubs	Nairobi League; 20 clubs	Eastern League; 20 clubs	North Eastern League; 20 clubs	Coast League; 20 clubs
5 County; Champions League	Baringo League	Bomet League	Bungoma League	Busia League	Embu League	Garissa League	Isiolo League	Kiambu League
5 County; Champions League	Elgeyo-Marakwet League	Homa Bay League	Kajiado League	Kakamega League	Kilifi League	Kirinyaga League	Kitui League	Kwale League
5 County; Champions League	Kericho League	Kisii League	Kisumu League	Laikipia League	Lamu League	Machakos League	Makueni League	Mandera League
5 County; Champions League	Migori League	Nakuru League	Nandi League	Narok League	Marsabit League	Meru League	Mombasa League	Murang'a League
5 County; Champions League	Nyamira League	Samburu League	Siaya League	Trans-Nzoia League	Nairobi A. League	Nairobi B. League	Nyandarua League	Nyeri League
5 County; Champions League	Turkana League	Uasin Gishu League	Vihiga League	West Pokot League	Taita-Taveta League	Tana River League	Tharaka-Nithi League	Wajir League
6 Sub-County Leagues	Sub-County Leagues							

=== Promotion and relegation ===
Promoted to Premier League

- Bandari
- Kakamega Homeboyz

Promoted from Provincial League

- Brighter Stars
- Hotsprings FC
- Jericho AllStars
- Kambakia Christian Centre
- Kisero
- Kisumu Youth Olympic Centre
- Kolongolo
- Maweni City
- Mount Kenya United
- Mumcop
- Murang'a United
- Nakumatt
- Raiders
- St. Joseph
- Suam Orchards
- Tala

Introduced to football league system

- FC Talanta

Relegated from Premier League

- Oserian
- Rangers

Relegated from Division One

- Gatundu Stars
- H.B.C. Mlimani
- Iron Strikers
- Karungu
- KSL Thola Glass
- Yanga

Eliminated from football league system

- Mathare Youth (disbanded)

==== Team name changes ====
- Congo JMJ United to FC West Ham United
- Rush to Kakamega Stars to Vihiga Stars
- Nakuru AllStars to Nakuru Top Fry AllStars
- Outgrowers to Busia United Stars
- Rangers to Posta Rangers
- Tala to Mumbi Nationale

=== Managerial changes ===
==== Premier League ====
As of 20:27, 29 September 2013 (UTC+3).

Team	Outgoing manager	Manner of departure	Date of vacancy	Incoming manager	Date of appointment	Position in table
AFC Leopards	(Netherlands) Jan Koops	Sacked	22 November 2012	(Kenya) Tom Olaba	5 February 2013	End of 2012 season
AFC Leopards	(Kenya) Tom Olaba	Sacked	2 April 2013	(Belgium) Luc Eymael	10 April 2013	6th
AFC Leopards	(Belgium) Luc Eymael	Sacked	17 September 2013	(Kenya) James Nandwa	17 September 2013	7th
Gor Mahia	(Croatia) Zdravko Logarusić	Sacked	25 June 2013	(Scotland) Bobby Williamson	5 July 2013	3rd
Karuturi Sports	(Kenya) Michael Nam	Resigned	14 March 2013	(Kenya) James Omondi	3 April 2013	7th
KCB	(Kenya) James Omondi	Sacked	28 November 2012	(Kenya) Abdallah Juma	19 December 2012	End of 2012 season
Nairobi City Stars	(The Gambia) Bye Wadda	Resigned	10 June 2013	(Netherlands) Jan Koops	17 September 2013	11th
Sofapaka	(England) Stewart Hall	Resigned	30 October 2012	(Kenya) David Ouma	11 January 2013	End of 2012 season
Sofapaka	(Kenya) David Ouma	Demoted	27 August 2013	(Uganda) Sam Timbe	27 August 2013	3rd
Sony Sugar	(Kenya) Zedekiah Otieno	Resigned	November 2012	(Kenya) Sammy Omollo	14 December 2012	End of 2012 season
Sony Sugar	(Kenya) Sammy Omollo	Sacked	9 July 2013	(Kenya) Zedekiah Otieno	10 July 2013	13th
Ulinzi Stars	(Kenya) Sammy Simiyu	Demoted	25 December 2012	(Kenya) Salim Ali	25 December 2012	End of 2012 season
Western Stima	(Kenya) Henry Omino	End of contract	December 2012	(Kenya) Francis Baraza	28 December 2012	End of 2012 season

==== Division One ====
As of 19:24, 5 May 2013 (UTC+3).

Team	Outgoing manager	Manner of departure	Date of vacancy	Incoming manager	Date of appointment	Position in table
Agrochemical	(Kenya) Leonard Saleh	Sacked	November 2012	(Kenya) James Omondi	21 January 2013	End of 2012 season
FC Talanta	(England) Jonathan Coles	Demoted	14 March 2013	(Kenya) Michael Nam	14 March 2013	End of 2012 season
Kolongolo	Unknown			(Netherlands) Jan Koops	3 March 2013	End of 2012 season
Kolongolo	(Netherlands) Jan Koops	Resigned	14 April 2013	(Kenya) Cox Imelenyi	16 April 2013	9th
Mahakama	(Kenya) Ezekiel Akwana	End of contract	31 January 2013	(Kenya) Zedekiah Otieno	19 March 2013	End of 2012 season
Rangers	(Kenya) James Nandwa	Sacked	November 2012	(Kenya) Leonard Saleh	21 December 2012	End of 2012 season

=== Premier League ===
The 2013 Kenyan Premier League season began on 24 February 2013 and is scheduled to end on 9 November 2013, with a break that will last from 26 May 2013 to 23 June 2013.

Pos	Team	Pld	W	D	L	GF	GA	GD	Pts	Qualification or relegation
1	Gor Mahia (C, Q)	30	17	9	4	32	15	+17	60	Qualification for 2014 CAF Champions League
2	A.F.C. Leopards (Q)	30	14	8	8	39	25	+14	50	Qualification for 2014 CAF Confederation Cup (Note: A.F.C. Leopards qualified for the 2014 CAF Confederation Cup as winners of the 2013 FKF President's Cup.)
3	Sofapaka	30	13	11	6	35	22	+13	50	
4	Kenya Commercial Bank	30	11	14	5	40	22	+18	47	
5	Tusker	30	10	12	8	30	23	+7	42	
6	Bandari	30	10	12	8	30	28	+2	42	
7	Thika United	30	11	9	10	27	31	−4	42	
8	Ulinzi Stars	30	10	11	9	22	21	+1	41	
9	Chemelil Sugar	30	10	10	10	27	24	+3	40	
10	Muhoroni Youth	30	9	8	13	21	40	−19	35	
11	SoNy Sugar	30	7	13	10	19	28	−9	34	
12	Western Stima	30	6	14	10	23	25	−2	32	
13	Mathare United	30	5	17	8	24	27	−3	32	
14	Nairobi City Stars	30	7	11	12	24	36	−12	32	
15	Kakamega Homeboyz (R)	30	6	11	13	22	29	−7	29	Relegation to 2014 National Super League
16	Vegpro (R)	30	4	10	16	17	36	−19	22	Relegation to 2014 National Super League

Updated to match(es) played on 9 November 2013. Source: Kenyan Premier League
Rules for classification: 1) points; 2) goal difference; 3) number of goals scored.
(C) Champions; (Q) Qualified for the phase indicated; (R) Relegated

=== Division One ===
The 2013 FKF Division One season began on 23 March and is scheduled to end on 17 November. For this season, all Division One teams endorsed a decision to split both Zone A and Zone B into two groups of 12 teams each, increasing the total number of teams in the league to 48. It was decided that the first group from Zone A comprise teams from the Nairobi, Aberdares and Mount Kenya regions while the second group comprise teams from the Eastern, North and South Coast regions. The first group from Zone B is to comprise teams from the South Nyanza, Central and South Rift regions while the second group comprise teams from the North Nyanza, North Rift and Western regions. Winners from each of these four groups will play the winners from the other group in their zone in a two-legged play-off tie to determine who gains promotion to the Kenyan Premier League for the following season.

On 25 April, the Football Kenya Federation decided to slash the league to 20 teams for the 2014 season. For that to happen, it was decided that the league will consist of top 5 teams in each zone (except the two teams that win the promotion play-offs) in addition to the two relegated Premier League teams. The remaining 29 teams will be relegated to FKF Division Two, which will begin next season, along with the 8 teams promoted from the Provincial League.

==== Zone A ====
===== Group 1 =====
Pos	Team	Pld	W	D	L	GF	GA	GD	Pts	Qualification or relegation
1	Kenya Revenue Authority (O, P, Q)	22	15	5	2	36	8	+28	50	Qualification for promotion play-offs
2	FC Talanta (P)	22	12	8	2	42	17	+25	44	Promotion to 2014 Kenyan National Super League
3	Bidco United (P)	22	12	6	4	41	19	+22	42	Promotion to 2014 Kenyan National Super League
4	Ligi Ndogo (P)	22	12	5	5	35	22	+13	41	Promotion to 2014 Kenyan National Super League
5	Nairobi Stima (P)	22	9	11	2	32	14	+18	38	Promotion to 2014 Kenyan National Super League
6	Mahakama	22	10	7	5	33	14	+19	37	
7	Coast United	22	7	5	10	19	26	−7	26	
8	Kambakia Christian Centre	22	6	2	14	21	37	−16	20	
9	Alaskan	22	6	2	14	24	41	−17	20	
10	Sparki Youth	22	5	4	13	16	33	−17	19	
11	Kibera Celtic	22	4	6	12	15	28	−13	18	
12	Brighter Stars	22	2	3	17	10	65	−55	9	
13	Murang'a United (E)	0	0	0	0	0	0	0	0	Suspended from league (Note: Murang'a United were suspended from the league for the rest of the season and had all their results nullified for missing three consecutive league games.)

Updated to match(es) played on 10 November 2013. Source: FKF Division One, Zone A, Group 1
Rules for classification: 1) points; 2) goal difference; 3) number of goals scored.
(E) Eliminated; (O) Play-off winners; (P) Promoted; (Q) Qualified for the phase indicated

===== Group 2 =====
Pos	Team	Pld	W	D	L	GF	GA	GD	Pts	Qualification or relegation
1	Posta Rangers (Q)	22	16	5	1	52	9	+43	53	Qualification for promotion play-offs
2	Nakumatt (P)	22	14	3	5	32	19	+13	45	Promotion to 2014 Kenyan National Super League
3	Modern Coast Rangers (P)	22	13	5	4	30	14	+16	44	Promotion to 2014 Kenyan National Super League
4	Kariobangi Sharks (P)	22	11	5	6	36	25	+11	38	Promotion to 2014 Kenyan National Super League
5	Administration Police (P)	22	11	4	7	30	21	+9	37	Promotion to 2014 Kenyan National Super League
6	Admiral	22	10	3	9	27	32	−5	33	
7	MOYAS	22	9	5	8	30	19	+11	32	
8	Green Berets	22	8	5	9	19	19	0	29	
9	FC West Ham United	22	4	4	14	18	44	−26	16	
10	Mumbi Nationale	22	4	4	14	17	45	−28	16	
11	Mount Kenya United	22	4	2	16	15	38	−23	14	
12	Jericho AllStars	22	2	7	13	15	36	−21	13	

Updated to match(es) played on 16 November 2013. Source: FKF Division One, Zone A, Group 2
Rules for classification: 1) points; 2) goal difference; 3) number of goals scored.
(P) Promoted; (Q) Qualified for the phase indicated

==== Zone B ====
===== Group 1 =====
Pos	Team	Pld	W	D	L	GF	GA	GD	Pts	Qualification or relegation
1	Nakuru AllStars (O, P, Q)	22	16	5	1	35	7	+28	53	Qualification for promotion play-offs
2	West Kenya Sugar (P)	22	17	1	4	45	16	+29	52	Promotion to 2014 Kenyan National Super League
3	Nzoia United (P)	21	12	4	5	35	15	+20	40	Promotion to 2014 Kenyan National Super League
4	G.F.C. 105 (P)	22	12	2	8	32	25	+7	38	Promotion to 2014 Kenyan National Super League
5	Zoo Kericho (P)	21	10	5	6	28	14	+14	35	Promotion to 2014 Kenyan National Super League
6	Mumcop	22	9	4	9	34	33	+1	31	
7	Timsales	21	9	3	9	26	20	+6	30	
8	Kolongolo	22	6	7	9	17	29	−12	25	
9	Comply	21	6	4	11	18	28	−10	22	
10	Shabana	19	5	2	12	17	37	−20	17	
11	Suam Orchards	21	4	3	14	18	49	−31	15	
12	Kisero	22	1	2	19	11	43	−32	5	

Updated to match(es) played on 3 November 2013. Source: FKF Division One, Zone B, Group 1
Rules for classification: 1) points; 2) goal difference; 3) number of goals scored.
(O) Play-off winners; (P) Promoted; (Q) Qualified for the phase indicated

===== Group 2 =====
Pos	Team	Pld	W	D	L	GF	GA	GD	Pts	Qualification or relegation
1	Oserian (Q)	22	16	6	0	41	12	+29	54	Qualification for 2014 Kenyan Premier League promotion play-offs
2	Finlays Horticulture (P)	22	16	3	3	33	9	+24	51	Promotion to 2014 Kenyan National Super League
3	Hotsprings (P)	22	13	2	7	32	25	+7	41	Promotion to 2014 Kenyan National Super League
4	St. Joseph (P)	22	12	4	6	41	18	+23	40	Promotion to 2014 Kenyan National Super League
5	Agrochemical (P)	21	12	4	5	28	16	+12	40	Promotion to 2014 Kenyan National Super League
6	Busia United Stars	21	10	4	7	25	21	+4	34	
7	Longonot Horticulture	22	7	9	6	18	17	+1	30	
8	Field Negroes	22	8	3	11	28	35	−7	27	
9	Vihiga Stars	20	4	3	13	17	32	−15	15	
10	Gusii Raiders	21	4	2	15	15	34	−19	14	
11	Utawala	21	2	5	14	13	39	−26	11	
12	Kisumu Municipal	22	1	3	18	9	42	−33	6	

Updated to match(es) played on 2 November 2013. Source: FKF Division One, Zone B, Group 2
Rules for classification: 1) points; 2) goal difference; 3) number of goals scored.
(P) Promoted; (Q) Qualified for the phase indicated

==== Promotion play-offs ====
The promotion play-offs were contested between the winners of each of the 2 groups in both zones, to determine the winners of the zones, who would be consequently promoted to the Premier League. The losers would still gain promotion to the National Super League.

21 December 2013 Zone A	Kenya Revenue Authority	2–2 (5–4 p)	Posta Rangers	Shauri Moyo, Nairobi
15:35 UTC+3	Olwith 15'; Ajwang 26'	Report 1 Report 2	Tiego 60'; Hassan 75'	Stadium: Nairobi City Stadium
	Penalties
	Hassan (penalty scored); Kataka (penalty scored); Mukoi (penalty scored); Otieno (penalty scored); Macharia (penalty scored)		(penalty scored) Ochieng; (penalty scored) Ajwang; (penalty scored) Mbugi; (penalty scored) Mukaisi; (penalty missed) Opere

21 December 2013 Zone B	Top Fry AllStars	1–0	Oserian	Shauri Moyo, Nairobi
13:00 UTC+3	Andati 31'	Report	Oguna (yellow card) 58'	Stadium: Nairobi City Stadium

== Domestic cups ==
=== President's Cup ===
The 2013 FKF President's Cup began on 20 July ended on 17 November.

First round
Borabu Chiefs	0
Shabana Kisii	1
Nakumatt	7
Mulembe	2
Intercity	4'
Ulinzi Warrior	5
St. Joseph	1
Zoo Kericho	0
M.K. United	0
Nzoia United	2
MOYAS	3
Ligi Ndogo	0
K.N.H.	1
W. Kenya Sugar	6
Top Fry AllStars	1
FC Talanta	2
K.R.A.	1 (4)
Agrochemical	1 (5)
Wazito	1
Comply	0
Muhoroni Young	0
Black Mamba	1
Finlays H.	5
Nairobi Stima	4
Kisero	1
Hotsprings FC	2
K. Sharks	2
G.F.C. 105	0
Gatundu Stars	1
Bidco United	4
Internationale	1
Wazee Wa Kazi	4

Second round
Gor Mahia	6
Shabana Kisii	0
Nakumatt	0
Thika United	1
Western Stima	2
Ulinzi Warrior	0
St. Joseph	0
K. Homeboyz	1
Mathare United	3
Nzoia United	0
MOYAS	1
Ulinzi Stars	3
Sony Sugar	1
W. Kenya Sugar	0
Tusker	1
FC Talanta	0
Sofapaka	6
Agrochemical	0
Wazito	0
Nairobi City Stars	1
Bandari	2
Black Mamba	0
Finlays H.	2
K.C.B.	1
Karuturi Sports	2
Hotsprings FC	0
K. Sharks	2
Muhoroni Youth	0
Chemelil Sugar	3
Bidco United	1
A.F.C. Leopards	5
Wazee Wa Kazi	0

Third round
Gor Mahia	2
Thika United	0
Western Stima	0 (4)
K. Homeboyz	0 (3)
Mathare United	0 (8)
Ulinzi Stars	0 (7)
Sony Sugar	1
Tusker	0
Sofapaka	1
Nairobi City Stars	0
Bandari	0 (3)
Finlays H.	0 (4)
Karuturi Sports	1 (8)
K. Sharks	1 (7)
Chemelil Sugar	0
A.F.C. Leopards	1

Quarter-finals
Gor Mahia	2
Western Stima	0
Mathare United	0 (2)
Sony Sugar	0 (4)
Sofapaka	1
Finlays H.	0
Karuturi Sports	0
A.F.C. Leopards	3

Semi-finals
Gor Mahia	0 (4)
Sony Sugar	0 (2)
Sofapaka	0
A.F.C. Leopards	2

Final
Gor Mahia	0
A.F.C. Leopards	1

=== Super Cup ===
During the 2013 season there were 2 Kenyan Super Cup matches held.

==== Pre-season match ====
The first 2013 Kenyan Super Cup match was played on 23 February 2013 between Tusker, the 2012 Kenyan Premier League champions, and Gor Mahia, the 2012 FKF President's Cup champions. Gor Mahia won 5–4 on penalties after the match ended 0–0 at full-time.

23 February 2013	Tusker	0–0 (4–5 p)	Gor Mahia	Nyayo National Stadium, Nairobi
16:00 UTC+3	Oluoch (red card) 3'	Report		Referee: Sylvester Kirwa
	Penalties
	Ochieng (penalty scored); Awisho (penalty scored); Were (penalty scored); Odipo (penalty missed); Omunik (penalty missed); Shikokoti (penalty scored); Kizza (penalty missed)		(penalty scored) Omondi; (penalty scored) Sserunkuma; (penalty scored) Lavatsa; (penalty missed) Odhiambo; (penalty missed) Emuge; (penalty scored) Nasio; (penalty scored) Mosoti

==== Post-season match ====
The second 2013 Kenyan Super Cup match was played on 14 December 2013 between Gor Mahia, the 2013 Kenyan Premier League champions, and Tusker, the 2013 KPL Top 8 Cup champions. Tusker won 5–3 on penalties after the match ended 1–1 at full-time.

14 December 2013	Gor Mahia	1–1 (3–5 p)	Tusker	Moi International Sports Centre, Kasarani
15:00 UTC+3	Oluoch 23'; Mohammed (yellow card) 59'; Ochieng (yellow card) 64'	Report	Wahome (yellow card) 18' (goal) 68'
	Penalties
	Sserunkuma (penalty scored); Owino (penalty scored); Mosoti (penalty scored); Nasio (penalty missed)		(penalty scored) I. Salim; (penalty scored) Monday; (penalty scored) C. Alwanga; (penalty scored) B. Alwanga; (penalty scored) Abondo

=== Top 8 Cup ===
The 2013 KPL Top 8 Cup began on 3 April with the quarter-finals and ended on 24 July with the final.

Quarterfinals
Sofapaka	1 (3)
Thika United	1 (5)
Chemelil Sugar	3
A.F.C. Leopards	2
Ulinzi Stars	0 (2)
Gor Mahia	0 (4)
Tusker	3
Mathare United	1

Semifinals
Thika United	0	1	1 (3)
Chemelil Sugar	1	0	1 (2)
Gor Mahia	0	0	0
Tusker	1	0	0

Finals
Thika United	2 (3)
Tusker	2 (5)

== International club competitions ==
=== Champions League ===
The 2013 CAF Champions League began on 15 February 2013 and ended on 10 November 2013. Tusker were representing Kenya in the competition, having won the 2012 Kenyan Premier League.

==== Preliminary round ====
In the preliminary round, Tusker faced St Michel United, the 2012 Seychelles League champions, and won 7–1 on aggregate over two legs, played on 16 February and 2 March.

16 February 2013	St Michel United (Seychelles)	1–4	(Kenya) Tusker	Stade Linité, Victoria
16:30 UTC+4	Tsaralaza 27'	Report	Ochieng 30', 85'; Olunga 72'; Sekayombya 83'	Referee: Ali Adelaïd (Comoros)

2 March 2013	Tusker (Kenya)	3–0	(Seychelles) St Michel United	Moi International Sports Centre, Kasarani
16:00 UTC+3	Opiyo 65'; Sekayombya 70'; Shikokoti 79'	Report		Referee: Eric Gasinzigwa (Burundi)

==== First round ====
In the first round, Tusker faced Al-Ahly, who have won the Egyptian Premier League a record 36 times and the CAF Champions League a record 7 times, and lost 4–1 on aggregate over two legs, played on 16 March and 7 April.

16 March 2013	Tusker (Kenya)	1–2	(Egypt) Al-Ahly	Nyayo National Stadium, Nairobi
	Were 59'		Moteab 48', 57'	Referee: Simanga Nhleko (Swaziland)

7 April 2013	Al-Ahly (Egypt)	2–0	(Kenya) Tusker	Borg El Arab Stadium, Alexandria
19:00 UTC+2	El-Zaher 6'; Moteab 38'	Report		Referee: Eric Otogo-Castane (Gabon)

=== Confederation Cup ===
The 2013 CAF Confederation Cup began on 16 February 2013 and ended on 30 November 2013. Gor Mahia were representing Kenya in the competition, having won the 2012 FKF President's Cup.

==== Preliminary round ====
In the preliminary round, Gor Mahia faced Anse Réunion, the 2012 Seychelles FA Cup champions, and won 5–0 on aggregate over two legs, played on 16 February and 2 March.

16 February 2013	Gor Mahia (Kenya)	0–0	(Seychelles) Anse Réunion	Nyayo National Stadium, Nairobi
16:00 UTC+03:00		Report		Referee: Bazezew Belete (Ethiopia)

2 March 2013	Anse Réunion (Seychelles)	0–5	(Kenya) Gor Mahia	Stade Linité, Victoria
16:30 UTC+4		Report	Kiongera 1', 14'; Wekesa 17'; Lavatsa 60'; Omondi 70'	Referee: Djamal Aden (Djibouti)

==== First round ====
In the first round, Gor Mahia faced ENPPI, the 2010–11 Egypt Cup winners, and lost 3–0 on aggregate over two legs, played on 15 March and 6 April.

15 March 2013	ENPPI (Egypt)	3–0	(Kenya) Gor Mahia	30 June Stadium, Cairo
	Die Foneye 31'; Omran 41'; Raouf 85'			Referee: Hagi Wiish (Somalia)

6 April 2013	Gor Mahia (Kenya)	0–0	(Egypt) ENPPI	Nyayo National Stadium, Nairobi
16:00 UTC+3		Report		Referee: Jonas Shongedi (Namibia)

== National teams ==
=== Men ===
==== World Cup qualification ====
The national team participated in the second round of World Cup qualifications in Africa. They were eliminated from the competition after losing 1–0 to Nigeria on 5 June.

Pos	Team	Pld	W	D	L	GF	GA	GD	Pts	Qualification	Nigeria national football team	Malawi national football team	Kenya national football team	Namibia national football team
1	Nigeria	6	3	3	0	7	3	+4	12	Third round	—	2–0	1–1	1–0
2	Malawi	6	1	4	1	4	5	−1	7		1–1	—	2–2	0–0
3	Kenya	6	1	3	2	4	5	−1	6		0–1	0–0	—	1–0
4	Namibia	6	1	2	3	2	4	−2	5		1–1	0–1	1–0	—

23 March 2013	Nigeria	1–1	Kenya	U. J. Esuene Stadium, Calabar
16:00 UTC+1	Oduamadi 90+3'	Report	Kahata 39'	Referee: Joshua Bondo (Botswana)

5 June 2013	Kenya	0–1	Nigeria	Moi International Sports Centre, Nairobi
16:00 UTC+3		Report	Musa 81'	Attendance: 30,000; Referee: Noumandiez Doué (Ivory Coast)

12 June 2013	Malawi	2–2	Kenya	Kamuzu Stadium, Blantyre
14:30 UTC+2	Ngalande 47'; Ng'ambi 81'	Report	Murunga 53'; Chavula 88' (o.g.)	Attendance: 13,000; Referee: Ali Adelaïd (Comoros)

8 September 2013	Kenya	1–0	Namibia	Moi International Sports Centre, Nairobi
16:00 UTC+3	Owino 6'	Report		Attendance: 20,000; Referee: Gehad Grisha (Egypt)

==== African Nations Championship qualification ====
The national team participated in the preliminary round of qualification for the 2014 African Nations Championship. They were eliminated from the competition having lost 1–0 to Burundi on aggregate. The first leg was played on 16 December 2012.

5 January 2013	Kenya	0–0	Burundi	Nyayo National Stadium, Nairobi
	Akumu (yellow card) 39'	Report	Y. Ndikumana (yellow card) 57' (yellow-red card) 74'; Ngizamasabo (yellow card) 66'	Referee: Ali Adelaïd (Comoros)

==== COSAFA Cup ====
Kenya were invited to participate in the 14th edition of the COSAFA Cup, which is being hosted by Zambia and is scheduled to run from 6 to 20 July. They were eliminated from the competition after losing 2–1 to Botswana on 11 July in the group stage.

Group B
Team	Pld	W	D	L	GF	GA	GD	Pts
Lesotho	3	1	2	0	7	5	+2	5
Botswana	3	1	2	0	5	4	+1	5
Kenya	3	1	1	1	5	4	+1	4
Swaziland	3	0	1	2	0	4	−4	1

8 July 2013^{†}	Kenya	2–2	Lesotho	Arthur Davies Stadium, Kitwe
17:00 UTC+2	Kiongera 82'; Atudo 88' (pen.)	Report	Mokhahalane 43' (pen.); Tale 58'	Referee: Victor Gomes (South Africa)

9 July 2013	Kenya	2–0	Swaziland	Arthur Davies Stadium, Kitwe
17:00 UTC+2	Lavatsa 5', 54'	Report		Referee: Samuel Chirindza (Mozambique)

11 July 2013	Kenya	1–2	Botswana	Nkana Stadium, Kitwe
15:00 UTC+2	Olerile 87' (o.g.)		Tshireletso 12'; Ramatlhakwane 90+4'	Referee: Bruno Tembo (Zambia)

^{†}This fixture was originally scheduled to take place on 7 July at 15:00 UTC+2. However, Kenya's arrival at the tournament was delayed due to the players' league commitments.

==== CECAFA Cup ====
The 37th edition of the CECAFA Cup was held in Kenya from 27 November to 12 December. The national team was drawn with Ethiopia, South Sudan and Zanzibar in Group A.

Group A
Team	Pld	W	D	L	GF	GA	GD	Pts
Kenya	3	2	1	0	5	1	+4	7
Ethiopia	3	2	1	0	5	1	+4	7
Zanzibar	3	1	0	2	3	6	−3	3
South Sudan	3	0	0	3	2	7	−5	0

27 November 2013	Kenya	0–0	Ethiopia	Nyayo National Stadium, Nairobi
16:30 UTC+3	Owino (yellow card) 30'; Omar (yellow card) 43'	Report	Bargecho (yellow card) 90+2'	Referee: Denis Batte (Uganda)

30 November 2013	South Sudan	1–3	Kenya	Nyayo National Stadium, Nairobi
16:00 UTC+3	Eresto (yellow card) 15'; Lado 28'	Report	Atudo 17' (pen.); Keli 29'; Omar (yellow card) 72'; Owino 77'	Referee: Waziri Sheha (Zanzibar)

3 December 2013	Kenya	2–0	Zanzibar	Kenyatta Stadium, Machakos
16:00 UTC+3	Atudo 5' (pen.); Situma (yellow card) 50'; Wanga 61'	Report	Makame (yellow card) 66'	Referee: Hagi Wiish (Somalia)

Knockout stage bracket

Quarter-finals
7 December – Mombasa
Uganda	2 (2)
Tanzania (pen.)	2 (3)
7 December – Mombasa
Kenya	1
Rwanda	0
8 December – Mombasa
Zambia (pen.)	0 (4)
Burundi	0 (3)
8 December – Mombasa
Ethiopia	0
Sudan	2

Semi-finals
10 December – Nairobi
Tanzania	0
Kenya	1
10 December – Mombasa
Zambia	1
Sudan	2

Final
12 December – Nairobi
Kenya	2
Sudan	0
Third place
12 December – Nairobi
Zambia (pen.)	1 (6)
Tanzania	1 (5)

7 December 2013 Quarter-finals	Kenya	1–0	Rwanda	Mombasa Municipal Stadium, Mombasa
16:00 UTC+3	Atudo 56' (pen.); Akumu (yellow card) 57'; Opiyo (yellow card) 70'	Report		Referee: Luleseghed Ghebremichael (Eritrea)

10 December 2013 Semi-finals	Tanzania	0–1	Kenya	Nyayo National Stadium, Nairobi
		Report	Miheso 3'; Situma (yellow card) 40'; Lavatsa (yellow card) 62'; Ochieng (yellow card) 90'	Referee: Thierry Nkurunziza (Burundi)

12 December 2013 Final	Kenya	2–0	Sudan	Nyayo National Stadium, Nairobi
18:00 UTC+3	Wanga 35', 69'; Omar (yellow card) 38'; Opiyo (yellow card) 86'; Kiongera (yellow card) 90+4'	Report	Kamal (yellow card) 44'	Referee: Hagi Wiish (Somalia)

==== Other matches ====
The following is a list of all other matches played by the Kenya men's team in 2013.

6 February 2013 Friendly	Kenya	3–0	Libya	Tunis, Tunisia
	Oliech 5', 13'; Were 80'	Report		Stadium: Stade Chedli Zouiten
