= 2010 in Kenyan football =

Football in Kenya
- Season: 2010

Men's football
- Premier League: Ulinzi Stars
- Nationwide League: Bandari
- FKL Cup: Sofapaka
- Super Cup: Sofapaka

The following article is a summary of the 2010 football season in Kenya, the 47th competitive season in its history.

== Domestic leagues ==
=== Promotion and relegation ===
Promoted to Premier League

- Mahakama
- Posta Rangers

Relegated from Premier League

- Agrochemical
- Bandari

=== Premier League ===
The 2010 Kenyan Premier League began on 20 February 2010 and ended on 14 November, 2010.

Pos	Team	Pld	W	D	L	GF	GA	GD	Pts	Qualification or relegation
1	Ulinzi Stars (C, Q)	30	16	11	3	37	16	+21	59	Qualification for 2011 CAF Champions League
2	Gor Mahia	30	15	11	4	33	15	+18	56	
3	Tusker	30	14	11	5	35	19	+16	53	
4	Sofapaka (Q)	30	11	14	5	39	23	+16	47	Qualification for 2011 CAF Confederation Cup (Note: Sofapaka as winners of the 2010 FKL Cup qualified for the 2011 CAF Confederation Cup.)
5	Sony Sugar	30	11	8	11	26	26	0	41	
6	Mathare United	30	7	18	5	31	28	+3	39	
7	Karuturi Sports	30	9	11	10	22	24	−2	38	
8	Western Stima	30	9	11	10	28	31	−3	38	
9	Chemelil Sugar	30	7	13	10	22	26	−4	34	
10	Thika United	30	8	10	12	23	30	−7	34	
11	Nairobi City Stars	30	7	13	10	25	34	−9	34	
12	A.F.C. Leopards	30	8	10	12	29	41	−12	34	
13	Posta Rangers	30	7	12	11	28	37	−9	33	
14	Kenya Commercial Bank	30	9	6	15	29	40	−11	33	
15	Red Berets (R)	30	7	10	13	27	32	−5	31	Relegation to 2011 Nationwide League
16	Mahakama (R)	30	5	11	14	21	33	−12	26	Relegation to 2011 Nationwide League

Updated to match(es) played on 8 December 2010. Source: 2010 Kenyan Premier League
Rules for classification: 1) points; 2) goal difference; 3) number of goals scored.
(C) Champions; (Q) Qualified for the phase indicated; (R) Relegated

==== Relegation ====
Red Berets and Mahakama, were relegated to the Nationwide League for the following season, but the former was disbanded due to immense pressure from its sponsors to produce good performances.

=== Nationwide League ===
At the end of the 2010 season, Bandari and Congo JMJ United gained promotion to the Premier League for the following season.

== Domestic cups ==
=== FKL Cup ===
Sofapaka beat West Kenya Sugar 2–0 in the final to lift the title for the second time their history.

=== Super Cup ===
The 2010 Kenyan Super Cup match was played on January 31, 2010, between Sofapaka, the 2009 Kenyan Premier League champions, and A.F.C. Leopards, who clinched their 8th FKL Cup title the same year. Sofapaka won 1−0 at full-time.

31 January 2012	Sofapaka	1 – 0	A.F.C. Leopards	Nyayo National Stadium, Nairobi
15:00 UTC+3	Mieno 19'	News		Attendance: 30,000

== International club competitions ==
=== Champions League ===
The 2010 CAF Champions League began on February 12, 2010, and finished on November 13, 2010. Sofapaka qualified for participation in the tournament as 2009 Kenyan Premier League champions. They were knocked out on aggregate in the preliminary round by Ismaily, who advanced to the first round.

February 13, 2010 Preliminaries	Sofapaka (Kenya)	0 – 0	(Egypt) Ismaily	Nyayo National Stadium, Nairobi
16:00 UTC+3		Report		Referee: Waziri Sheha (Tanzania)

February 27, 2010 Preliminaries	Ismaily (Egypt)	2 – 0	(Kenya) Sofapaka	Ismailia Stadium, Ismailia
19:30 UTC+2	Homos 54'; Said 67'	Report		Referee: Adel El Raay (Libya)

=== Confederation Cup ===
The 2012 CAF Confederation Cup began in February 2010 and ended in November 2010. A.F.C Leopards qualified for participation in the tournament as 2009 FKL Cup champions. They were knocked out on aggregate in the preliminary round by Banks, who advanced to the first round.

== National team ==
=== Africa Cup of Nations ===
The national team participated in the qualification phase of the 2012 Africa Cup of Nations. They finished third in their group and missed out on the final tournament.

Team	Pld	W	D	L	GF	GA	GD	Pts	ANG	UGA	KEN	GNB
Angola	6	4	0	2	7	5	+2	12		2–0	1–0	1–0
Uganda	6	3	2	1	6	2	+4	11	3–0		0–0	2–0
Kenya	6	2	2	2	4	4	0	8	2–1	0–0		2–1
Guinea-Bissau	6	1	0	5	2	8	−6	3	0–2	0–1	1–0	

Legend: Blue = home team win; Yellow = draw; Red = away team win.

September 4, 2010	Guinea-Bissau	1 – 0	Kenya	Estadio 24 de Setembro, Bissau
16:00 UTC±0	Dionísio 76'	Report		Referee: Kacem Bennaceur (Tunisia)

October 9, 2010	Kenya	0 – 0	Uganda	Kasarani Stadium, Nairobi
16:00 UTC+3		Report		Referee: Diata Badara (Senegal)

=== CECAFA Cup ===
Kenya participated in the 2010 CECAFA Cup, but were knocked out in the group stages, finishing last in their group with no points.

Team	Pld	W	D	L	GF	GA	GD	Pts
Uganda	3	2	1	0	5	2	+3	7
Malawi	3	1	2	0	5	4	+1	5
Ethiopia	3	1	1	1	4	4	0	4
Kenya	3	0	0	3	3	7	−4	0

November 29, 2010	Malawi	3 – 2	Kenya	Benjamin Mkapa National Stadium, Dar es Salaam
16:00 UTC+03:00	Nyirenda 1'; Banda 26', 81'		Baraza 34'; Ajwang 45+2'

December 2, 2010	Kenya	1 – 2	Ethiopia	Benjamin Mkapa National Stadium, Dar es Salaam
16:00 UTC+03:00	Ajwang 85'		Bekele 25', 44'

December 5, 2010	Uganda	2 – 0	Kenya	Benjamin Mkapa National Stadium, Dar es Salaam
16:00 UTC+03:00	Okwi 81'; Mwesigwa 90+2' (pen.)

=== Other matches ===
The following is a list of all other matches played by Kenya in 2010.

January 9, 2010 International friendly	Kenya	1 – 3	Cameroon	Nairobi, Kenya
	Situma 9'	Report	Webó 35'; Emana 56'; Idrissou 57'	Stadium: Moi International Sports Centre

January 15, 2010 International friendly	Yemen	3 – 1	Kenya	Sana'a, Yemen
		Report		Stadium: Ali Muhsin Al-Muriasi Stadium

August 11, 2010 International friendly	Tanzania	1 – 1	Kenya	Dar es Salaam, Tanzania
	Ngassa 67'	Report	Mariga 13'

August 18, 2010 International friendly	Ethiopia	0 – 3	Kenya	Addis Ababa, Ethiopia

November 23, 2010 International friendly	Tanzania	1 – 0	Kenya
