= 2007 in Kenyan football =

Football in Kenya
- Season: 2007

Men's football
- Premier League: Tusker
- President's Cup: Sofapaka

The following article is a summary of the 2007 football season in Kenya, the 44th competitive season in its history.

== Premier League ==
The league was originally supposed to begin in autumn of 2006, but wrangles between two factions led to a parallel league situation. One of them, the Kenyan Premier League, had only seven teams, but were backed by FIFA. Remaining teams formed the KFFPL, supported by the Kenyan government. Teams affiliated to KPL were private clubs and company teams, such as Tusker, and teams owned by non-governmental organizations, like sister clubs Mathare United and Mathare Youth, while teams affiliated to KFFPL were traditional community clubs like Gor Mahia, A.F.C. Leopards and Shabana Kisii, or teams belonging to government-owned organizations.

However, in March 2007, the two leagues were finally united into an 18-team league, though two teams, Mumias Sugar and Kangemi United, disbanded halfway through. The two relegated teams, A.F.C. Leopards and Shabana Kisii were not readmitted, although there were some calls for a larger 20-team league. This was in light of the equally controversial inclusion of Gor Mahia who had been expelled mid-season from the league in the previous season, and Mathare United, which had been relegated for fielding an ineligible player in ten matches.

The season finished in November 2007 with Tusker as the champions and Homegrown and Coast Stars relegated. Bandari and Western Stima gained promotion for the following season. Coast Stars appealed against the relegation to their financier Mohamed Hatimy, who also doubled up as the chairman of Kenya Football Federation. Hatimy's decision to reinstate the club was vetoed by FIFA following submissions by KPL.

=== Final table ===
Pos	Team	Pld	W	D	L	GF	GA	GD	Pts	Qualification or relegation
1	Tusker (C, Q)	30	16	11	3	43	21	+22	59	Qualification for 2008 CAF Champions League
2	Mathare United	30	15	11	4	34	13	+21	56	
3	Sony Sugar	30	14	13	3	35	15	+20	55	
4	Red Berets	30	13	7	10	35	35	0	46	
5	Sher Agencies	30	12	9	9	34	31	+3	45	
6	Ulinzi Stars	30	11	10	9	31	28	+3	43	
7	Chemelil Sugar	30	12	6	12	30	26	+4	42	
8	World Hope	30	11	9	10	32	39	−7	42	
9	Thika United	30	8	15	7	24	21	+3	39	
10	Mathare Youth	30	9	7	14	23	33	−10	34	
11	Gor Mahia	30	9	7	14	24	36	−12	34	
12	Agrochemical	30	8	9	13	27	28	−1	33	
13	Mahakama	30	8	7	15	28	43	−15	31	
14	Kenya Commercial Bank	30	7	9	14	30	33	−3	30	
15	Homegrown (R)	30	8	5	17	24	44	−20	29	Relegation to 2008 Nationwide League
16	Coast Stars (R)	30	7	7	16	31	49	−18	28	Relegation to 2008 Nationwide League

Rules for classification: 1) points; 2) goal difference; 3) number of goals scored.
(C) Champions; (Q) Qualified for the phase indicated; (R) Relegated

== President's Cup ==
The President's Cup was marred by the withdrawal of many leading teams. The cup was eventually won by Nationwide League side Sofapaka.

Since clubs from the Central African Republic, Chad, Kenya, Rwanda and Sierra Leone were disqualified for failure to fulfill their financial obligations, Sofapaka were unable to compete in the 2008 CAF Confederation Cup.

Semifinals
1	Sofapaka	1
4	Nakuru Police	0
3	Homegrown	2
2	Gor Mahia	1

Finals
Sofapaka	2
Homegrown	0

== National team ==
=== Africa Cup of Nations ===
The national team finished the qualification phase of the 2008 Africa Cup of Nations third in its group and missed the final tournament. They had played two out of their six qualifying matches in 2006, which are included below.

Team	Pld	W	D	L	GF	GA	GD	Pts
Angola	6	4	1	1	16	5	+11	13
Eritrea	6	2	3	1	5	8	−3	9
Kenya	6	2	1	3	6	7	−1	7
Swaziland	6	0	3	3	0	7	−7	3

September 2, 2006	Kenya	1 - 2	Eritrea	Moi International Sports Centre, Nairobi
	Mambo 65'		Origi 60' (o.g.); Shimangus 68'

October 8, 2006	Angola	3 - 1	Kenya	Estádio da Cidadela, Luanda
	Flávio 27', 68'; Mateus 60'		Ambani 81'

March 25, 2007	Kenya	2 - 0	Swaziland	Nyayo National Stadium, Nairobi
	Mariga 51'; Shikanda 75'

June 3, 2007	Swaziland	0 - 0	Kenya	Somhlolo National Stadium, Lobamba

June 16, 2007	Eritrea	1 - 0	Kenya	Asmara Stadium, Asmara
	Aregay 80'

September 8, 2007	Kenya	2 - 1	Angola	Nyayo National Stadium, Nairobi
	Oboya 18'; Oliech 87'		Manucho 35'

=== CECAFA Cup ===
Kenya also competed in the 2007 CECAFA Cup. They reached the quarter-finals but lost 4-2 on penalties to Uganda.

==== Group stage ====
Team	Pld	W	D	L	GF	GA	GD	Pts
Burundi	3	2	1	0	4	0	+4	7
Tanzania	3	2	1	0	3	1	+2	7
Kenya	3	1	0	2	3	3	0	3
Somalia	3	0	0	3	0	6	−6	0

December 8, 2007	Tanzania	2 - 1	Kenya	National Stadium, Dar es Salaam
	Khalfan 16' (pen.); Mrwanda 89'	Report	Wanga 45'

December 12, 2007	Kenya	0 - 1	Burundi	National Stadium, Dar es Salaam
		Report	Mbazumutima 33'

December 14, 2007	Kenya	2 - 0	Somalia	National Stadium, Dar es Salaam
	Mwangi 45'; Wanga 55'	Report

==== Quarter-finals ====
December 18, 2007	Uganda	1 - 1 (4 - 2 p)	Kenya	National Stadium, Dar es Salaam
	Okhuti 23'	Report	Wanga 75'
	Penalties
	Katerega (penalty scored); Wagaruka (penalty scored); Okhuti (penalty scored); Masaba (penalty scored)		(penalty missed) Wanga; (penalty missed) Monday

=== Other matches ===
The following is a list of other matches played by Kenya in 2007.

May 27, 2007 International friendly	Kenya	0 - 1	Nigeria	Nairobi, Kenya
		Report

June 10, 2007 International friendly	Kenya	2 - 0	Rwanda	Nairobi, Kenya
		Report

November 21, 2007 International friendly	Oman	2 - 2	Kenya	Muscat, Oman
		Report

November 22, 2007 International friendly	Oman	1 - 1	Kenya	Muscat, Oman
		Report
