= 2009 Kenyan Premier League =

Kenyan Premier League
- Season: 2009
- Champions: Sofapaka; 1st Premier League title 1st Kenyan title overall
- Relegated: Bandari; Agrochemical
- Champions League: Sofapaka
- Confederation Cup: A.F.C. Leopards (cup winner)
- Matches played: 240
- Goals scored: 487 (2.03 per match)
- Top goalscorer: John Baraza (Sofapaka); Emeka Joseph (Tusker); 15 goals
- Biggest home win: Tusker 5–0 Bandari (17 May 2009)
- Biggest away win: Agrochemical 0–3 Chemelil Sugar (22 April 2009) KCB 1–4 Tusker (2 August 2009) Red Berets 0–3 Sofapaka (7 November 2009)
- Highest scoring: Sony Sugar 4–3 Tusker (31 October 2009)

The 2009 Kenyan Premier League was the sixth season of the Kenyan Premier League since it started in 2003 and the forty-sixth season of top division football in Kenya since 1963. It began on 7 February with Agrochemical and Red Berets and ended on 21 November with Sony Sugar and Western Stima.

Sofapaka had an alarmingly remarkable season, having just been promoted from the Nationwide League for the first time and immediately winning the title. They also won the Kenyan Super Cup the following season.

Bandari and Agrochemical were relegated at the end of the season after replacing previously relegated Mahakama and Mathare Youth. However, Bandari gained promotion again for the 2011 season.

== Changes from last season ==
Relegated from Premier League

- Mahakama
- Mathare Youth

Promoted from Nationwide League

- A.F.C. Leopards
- Sofapaka

== Teams ==
=== Stadia and locations ===
Locations of the 2009 Kenyan Premier League teams.
- 1 - The location marked for Thika United is the location of the town, not the stadium.
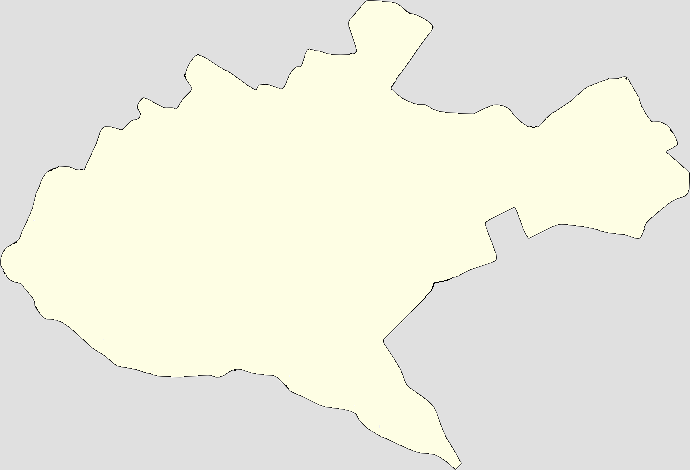
Locations of the 2009 Kenyan Premier League teams within Nairobi.

Team	Location	Stadium	Capacity
A.F.C. Leopards	Nairobi	Nyayo National Stadium	30,000
Agrochemical	Muhoroni	Furaha Academy Sports Ground	5,000
Bandari	Mombasa	Mombasa Municipal Stadium	10,000
Chemelil Sugar	Chemelil	Chemelil Sports Complex	5,000
Gor Mahia	Nairobi	Nairobi City Stadium	15,000
Karuturi Sports	Naivasha	Naivasha Stadium	5,000
KCB	Nairobi	Nairobi City Stadium	15,000
Mathare United	Nairobi	Kasarani Stadium	60,000
Nairobi City Stars	Nairobi	Hope Centre	5,000
Red Berets	Nakuru	Afraha Stadium	8,200
Sofapaka	Nairobi	Nyayo National Stadium	30,000
Sony Sugar	Awendo	Green Stadium	5,000
Thika United	Thika	Thika Municipal Stadium	5,000
Tusker	Nairobi	Kasarani Stadium	60,000
Ulinzi Stars	Nakuru	Afraha Stadium	8,200
Western Stima	Kakamega	Bukhungu Stadium	5,000

== League table ==
Pos	Team	Pld	W	D	L	GF	GA	GD	Pts	Qualification or relegation
1	Sofapaka (C, Q)	30	16	11	3	39	21	+18	59	Qualification for 2010 CAF Champions League
2	Mathare United	30	15	8	7	39	23	+16	53	
3	Thika United	34	13	12	9	31	19	+12	51	
4	Tusker	30	14	6	10	47	30	+17	48	
5	Gor Mahia	30	15	1	14	39	33	+6	46	
6	Nairobi City Stars	30	11	10	9	30	29	+1	43	
7	Karuturi Sports	30	9	13	8	19	17	+2	40	
8	Chemelil Sugar	30	10	10	10	28	28	0	40	
9	SoNy Sugar	30	11	7	12	29	31	−2	40	
10	Ulinzi Stars	30	8	15	7	24	26	−2	39	
11	Western Stima	30	8	12	10	29	38	−9	36	
12	Kenya Commercial Bank	30	8	10	12	32	39	−7	34	
13	A.F.C. Leopards (Q)	30	8	10	12	28	36	−8	34	Qualification for 2010 CAF Confederation Cup (Note: A.F.C. Leopards as winners of the 2009 FKL Cup qualified for the 2010 CAF Confederation Cup.)
14	Red Berets	30	7	9	14	28	43	−15	30	
15	Bandari (R)	30	7	8	15	25	41	−16	29	Relegation to 2010 Nationwide League
16	Agrochemical (R)	30	5	8	17	20	43	−23	23	Relegation to 2010 Nationwide League

Updated to match(es) played on 21 November 2009. Source: 2009 Kenyan Premier League
Rules for classification: 1) points; 2) goal difference; 3) number of goals scored.
(C) Champions; (Q) Qualified for the phase indicated; (R) Relegated

== Results ==
Home \ Away	AFC	AGC	BND	CHM	GOR	VGP	KCB	MAU	NCS	RBR	SOF	SNY	THU	TUS	ULS	WST
A.F.C. Leopards		1–2	1–1	0–1	1–0	0–1	1–1	0–1	0–0	2–1	1–1	0–0	1–1	2–3	1–1	3–2
Agrochemical	0–2		0–1	0–3	1–0	1–0	1–2	1–1	0–2	1–1	1–1	0–1	0–1	1–1	0–1	1–1
Bandari	2–0	2–2		2–0	2–1	1–0	1–2	0–0	1–2	1–2	1–0	1–2	3–1	1–1	1–1	0–0
Chemelil Sugar	2–1	1–0	3–0		0–1	1–1	0–0	1–2	0–1	0–0	1–1	2–2	0–0	0–0	1–3	1–0
Gor Mahia	3–2	2–1	2–0	1–2		1–1	2–1	1–2	1–2	3–0	1–0	2–1	0–1	2–1	4–2	1–0
Vegpro	0–0	1–2	2–0	1–0	1–0		0–0	0–0	1–0	1–2	0–0	2–0	0–0	1–0	0–1	1–0
Kenya Commercial Bank	1–3	0–0	1–1	1–2	2–1	1–1		0–2	3–1	2–2	1–2	3–2	1–1	1–4	2–0	2–3
Mathare United	1–2	2–0	2–1	2–3	1–3	0–0	2–0		3–0	4–1	0–1	2–0	1–0	1–0	2–2	2–1
Nairobi City Stars	2–0	1–1	1–1	0–1	0–1	1–0	2–1	0–2		3–0	1–1	0–0	1–3	3–2	0–0	0–1
Red Berets	0–0	0–1	2–0	2–1	1–2	1–1	0–2	1–1			0–3	2–1	0–1	3–2	0–0	2–2
Sofapaka	4–1	2–1	1–0	2–1	2–1	1–1	2–1	1–0	1–2	1–0		2–1	1–1	3–2	2–0	2–1
SoNy Sugar	0–1	2–1	1–0	0–0	2–1	1–1	0–1	2–0	0–1	1–0	0–1		2–0	4–3	1–0	2–0
Thika United	0–0	4–0	3–0	0–0	1–0	1–0	2–0	0–0	1–1	3–2	0–0	2–1		1–0	1–0	1–1
Tusker	3–0	1–0	5–0	3–0	0–1	0–1	1–0	1–0	1–1	2–1	1–1	3–0	2–1		0–0	2–1
Ulinzi Stars	0–2	2–1	2–1	2–1	1–0	2–0	0–0	1–1	0–0	0–0	0–0	0–0	0–0	0–2		2–2
Western Stima	2–0	4–0	1–0	0–0	2–1	0–0	0–0	0–2	1–1	1–0	0–0	0–0	2–0	0–1	1–1	

Updated to match(es) played on 21 November 2009. Source: Kenyan Premier League
Legend: Blue = home team win; Yellow = draw; Red = away team win.

== See also ==
- 2009 Kenyan Super Cup
- Kenyan football in 2009
