= 2011 Kenyan Nationwide League =

Kenyan Nationwide League
- Season: 2012

FKL Nationwide League
- Champions: Oserian
- Promoted: Oserian
- Relegated: Strathmore University; Real Kisumu; Opera
- Matches played: 240
- Goals scored: 577 (2.4 per match)
- Biggest home win: Strathmore University 6–2 Magongo Rangers (30 April 2011) Nakuru AllStars 4–0 Mathare Youth (11 June 2011); Nakuru AllStars 4–0 Opera (14 August 2011); Real Kisumu 4–0 Opera (27 August 2011) Bidco United 4–0 Finlays Horticulture (27 August 2011)
- Biggest away win: Real Kisumu 1–6 Mahakama (15 May 2011)
- Highest scoring: Mathare Youth 7–3 Admiral (2 April 2011)

KFF Nationwide League
- Champions: Muhoroni Youth
- Promoted: Muhoroni Youth
- Relegated: Makarios; Nanyuki; Annex 07; Kiambaa United
- Matches played: 200
- Goals scored: 555 (2.78 per match)
- Biggest home win: KSL Thola Glass 6–0 Annex 07 (23 July 2011)
- Biggest away win: Makarios 0–5 Ligi Ndogo (13 March 2011)
- Highest scoring: Iron Strikers 6–1 Annex 07 (29 May 2011) Kariobangi Sharks 6–1 Milimani Youth (10 July 2011) Kariobangi Sharks 6–1 Yanga (17 September 2011)

The 2011 Kenyan Nationwide League was the 48th season of the Kenyan Nationwide League.

Oserian and Muhoroni Youth finished top in their zones, but the latter's promotion was heavily questioned, as the KFF Nationwide League season was inconclusive. Former KFF chairman Mohamed Hatimy said that Muhoroni Youth's promotion was unconstitutional as the league they played in was "unknown". He continued to say that there was only one Nationwide League; that run by the FKL and any promoted teams should have come from the FKL Nationwide League.

Red Berets had been relegated from the Premier League the previous season, but disbanded as they were under immense pressure from their sponsors to produce good performances.

== League tables ==
=== FKL Nationwide League ===
Pos	Team	Pld	W	D	L	GF	GA	GD	Pts	Promotion or relegation
1	Oserian (C, P)	30	13	12	5	49	34	+15	51	Promotion to 2012 Kenyan Premier League
2	Mahakama	30	14	7	9	46	31	+15	49	
3	Agrochemical	30	13	10	7	32	23	+9	49	
4	Nairobi Stima	30	11	15	4	32	23	+9	48	
5	Kenya Revenue Authority	30	12	11	7	47	35	+12	47	
6	Magongo Rangers	30	13	6	11	36	43	−7	45	
7	Admiral	30	11	11	8	40	37	+3	44	
8	Finlays Horticulture	30	10	12	8	29	30	−1	42	
9	Administration Police	30	11	8	11	34	34	0	41	
10	Nakuru AllStars	30	10	9	11	35	32	+3	39	
11	Bidco United	30	8	14	8	36	30	+6	38	
12	Gusii United	30	9	10	11	39	38	+1	37	
13	Mathare Youth	30	6	12	12	37	39	−2	30	Relegation to 2012 Kenyan Provincial League (Note: Mathare Youth were to be relegated to Division Two, but due to a lack of enough teams in Zone A of FKF Division One, they were added to complete the list of 20 teams.)
14	Strathmore University (R)	30	6	9	15	38	53	−15	27	Relegation to 2012 Kenyan Provincial League
15	Real Kisumu (R)	30	5	12	13	27	42	−15	27	Relegation to 2012 Kenyan Provincial League
16	KSL Thola Glass (R)	30	6	6	18	20	53	−33	24	Relegation to 2012 Kenyan Provincial League

Updated to match(es) played on 27 November 2011. Source: FKL Nationwide One
Rules for classification: 1) points; 2) goal difference; 3) number of goals scored.
(C) Champions; (P) Promoted; (R) Relegated

=== KFF Nationwide League ===
Pos	Team	Pld	W	D	L	GF	GA	GD	Pts	Promotion or relegation
1	Muhoroni Youth (C, P)	30	23	5	2	51	21	+30	74	Promotion to 2012 Kenyan Premier League (Note: Muhoroni Youth were promoted to the Premier League under controversial circumstances as the season was inconclusive.)
2	Ligi Ndogo	30	22	4	4	59	18	+41	70	
3	Kariobangi Sharks	28	19	6	3	53	19	+34	63	
4	KSL Thola Glass	29	18	3	8	56	26	+30	57	
5	Iron Strikers	30	14	8	8	50	29	+21	50	
6	Milimani	27	13	3	11	32	31	+1	42	
7	Kenya Meat Commission	28	13	0	15	23	40	−17	39	
8	Karungu	28	11	5	12	27	29	−2	38	
9	Don Bosco	30	11	8	11	34	34	0	41	
10	Utawala	29	12	2	15	37	37	0	38	
11	Yanga	29	9	5	15	29	37	−8	32	
12	Lugulu Stars	29	9	3	17	23	31	−8	30	
13	Makarios (R)	28	9	2	17	21	45	−24	29	Relegation to 2012 Kenyan Provincial League (Note: Relegation of teams in the league this season was done under controversial circumstances as the season was inconclusive.)
14	Nanyuki (R)	29	7	4	18	26	52	−26	25	Relegation to 2012 Kenyan Provincial League
15	Annex 07 (R)	29	7	1	21	20	51	−31	22	Relegation to 2012 Kenyan Provincial League
16	Kiambaa United (R)	30	4	2	24	13	50	−37	14	Relegation to 2012 Kenyan Provincial League

Source: KFF Nationwide One
Rules for classification: 1) points; 2) goal difference; 3) number of goals scored.
(C) Champions; (P) Promoted; (R) Relegated
