= Peter Serry =

Kenyan footballer (1973–2009)

Peter Serry (13 February 1973 – 28 January 2009) was a Kenyan football player, coach and administrator.

As a youth player Serry played for Mathare Youth Sports Association (MYSA), which operates in the Mathare slum in Nairobi. Among other achievements, he was part of the team that won the U13 category at Norway Cup in 1995. Later Serry played in the Kenyan Premier League for Mathare United and KCB.

After footballing career, he served as he was the head coach of Mathare Youth for the 2003–04 season. In that season, Mathare Youth played in the third level, but promoted to the Nationwide League (second level) at the end of the season. Serry, however, moved to the assistant coach position of the premier league team Mathare United for the next season (2004–05). Serry held a UEFA-B Diploma License in Coaching and various other certificates. He also contributed for charity work at the Kakuma refugee camp and Southern Sudan.

He was the chairman of Mathare Youth from 2004 to 2006, during which time the team promoted to the Premier League, where its sister team Mathare United already played. Serry also held various administrative positions at MYSA, being its managing director between 2002 and 2006.

In 2008, he was appointed the CEO of Tusker FC replacing Patrick Naggi who became the technical director of Football Kenya Limited. The same year Serry was part of the coaching team of the Kenya national team but was dismissed only shortly before his death alongside head coach Francis Kimanzi in January 2009.

Serry died in the 2009 Nakumatt supermarket fire in Nairobi on 28 January 2009, aged 35. He was accompanied by Tusker FC Coach James Nandwa, who escaped alive. Serry left a widow and three children.
