= 2010 Kenyan Premier League =

Kenyan Premier League
- Season: 2010
- Champions: Ulinzi Stars; 4th Premier League title 4th Kenyan title overall
- Relegated: Red Berets; Mahakama
- Champions League: Ulinzi Stars
- Confederation Cup: Sofapaka (cup winner)
- Top 8 Cup: Ulinzi Stars; Gor Mahia; Tusker; Sofapaka; Sony Sugar; Mathare United; Karuturi Sports; Western Stima
- Matches played: 240
- Goals scored: 455 (1.9 per match)
- Top goalscorer: John Baraza; Sofapaka; 15 goals
- Biggest home win: Red Berets 4–0 Chemelil Sugar (21 August 2010)
- Biggest away win: KCB 0–4 Ulinzi Stars (4 April 2010); Red Berets 0–4 Sofapaka (17 July 2010)
- Highest scoring: KCB 3–4 A.F.C. Leopards (25 July 2010)

The 2010 Kenyan Premier League was the seventh season of the Kenyan Premier League since it started in 2003 and the forty-seventh season of top division football in Kenya since 1963. It began on 20 February with Mahakama and Sony Sugar and ended on 14 November with Nairobi City Stars and Gor Mahia.

Sofapaka had previously won the title but Ulinzi Stars finished top. Sofapaka still won the 2010 Kenyan Super Cup after defeating 12-time champions A.F.C. Leopards.

After staying in the league for an entire decade, Red Berets, who were only two points behind KCB when they were relegated along with previously promoted Mahakama, disbanded to immense pressure from its sponsors to produce good performances. The two teams had replaced Bandari and Agrochemical, the former gaining promotion once again for the next season.

== Changes from last season ==
Relegated from Premier League

- Agrochemical
- Bandari

Promoted from Nationwide League

- Mahakama
- Posta Rangers

== Teams ==
=== Stadia and locations ===
Locations of the 2010 Kenyan Premier League teams.
- 1 - The location marked for Thika United is the location of the town, not the stadium.
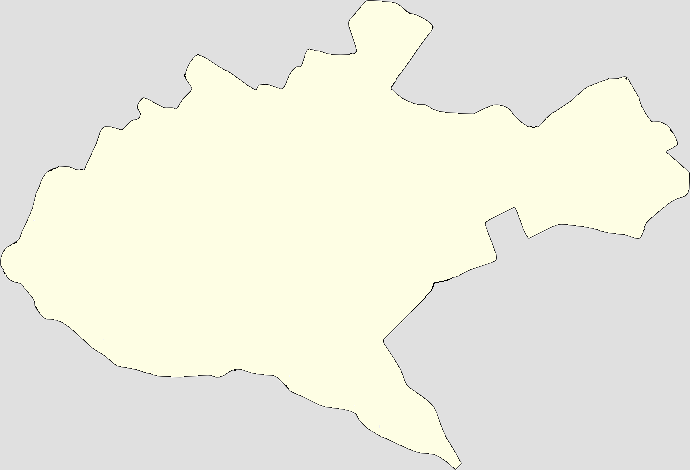
Locations of the 2010 Kenyan Premier League teams within Nairobi.

Team	Location	Stadium	Capacity
A.F.C. Leopards	Nairobi	Nyayo National Stadium	30,000
Chemelil Sugar	Chemelil	Chemelil Sports Complex	5,000
Gor Mahia	Nairobi	Nairobi City Stadium	15,000
Karuturi Sports	Naivasha	Naivasha Stadium	5,000
KCB	Nairobi	Nairobi City Stadium	15,000
Mahakama	Nairobi	Nairobi City Stadium	15,000
Mathare United	Nairobi	Kasarani Stadium	60,000
Nairobi City Stars	Nairobi	Hope Centre	5,000
Posta Rangers	Nairobi	Nyayo National Stadium	30,000
Red Berets	Nakuru	Afraha Stadium	8,200
Sofapaka	Nairobi	Nyayo National Stadium	30,000
Sony Sugar	Awendo	Green Stadium	5,000
Thika United	Thika	Thika Municipal Stadium	5,000
Tusker	Nairobi	Kasarani Stadium	60,000
Ulinzi Stars	Nakuru	Afraha Stadium	8,200
Western Stima	Kakamega	Bukhungu Stadium	5,000

== League table ==
Pos	Team	Pld	W	D	L	GF	GA	GD	Pts	Qualification or relegation
1	Ulinzi Stars (C, Q)	30	16	11	3	37	16	+21	59	Qualification for 2011 CAF Champions League
2	Gor Mahia	30	15	11	4	33	15	+18	56	
3	Tusker	30	14	11	5	35	19	+16	53	
4	Sofapaka (Q)	30	11	14	5	39	23	+16	47	Qualification for 2011 CAF Confederation Cup (Note: Sofapaka as winners of the 2010 FKL Cup qualified for the 2011 CAF Confederation Cup.)
5	Sony Sugar	30	11	8	11	26	26	0	41	
6	Mathare United	30	7	18	5	31	28	+3	39	
7	Karuturi Sports	30	9	11	10	22	24	−2	38	
8	Western Stima	30	9	11	10	28	31	−3	38	
9	Chemelil Sugar	30	7	13	10	22	26	−4	34	
10	Thika United	30	8	10	12	23	30	−7	34	
11	Nairobi City Stars	30	7	13	10	25	34	−9	34	
12	A.F.C. Leopards	30	8	10	12	29	41	−12	34	
13	Posta Rangers	30	7	12	11	28	37	−9	33	
14	Kenya Commercial Bank	30	9	6	15	29	40	−11	33	
15	Red Berets (R)	30	7	10	13	27	32	−5	31	Relegation to 2011 Nationwide League
16	Mahakama (R)	30	5	11	14	21	33	−12	26	Relegation to 2011 Nationwide League

Updated to match(es) played on 8 December 2010. Source: 2010 Kenyan Premier League
Rules for classification: 1) points; 2) goal difference; 3) number of goals scored.
(C) Champions; (Q) Qualified for the phase indicated; (R) Relegated

== Results ==
Home \ Away	AFC	CHM	GOR	VGP	KCB	MAH	MAU	NCS	PRN	RBR	SOF	SNY	THU	TUS	ULS	WST
A.F.C. Leopards		0–2	1–0	0–1	0–2	2–1	1–1	1–1	2–1	2–1	2–4	0–1	1–0	2–4	0–1	1–1
Chemelil Sugar	0–0		3–0	0–0	0–0	0–0	1–1	3–1	0–0	2–1	0–0	0–1	2–0	0–1	0–1	0–0
Gor Mahia	1–0	4–1		1–0	0–1	2–0	0–0	1–0	1–0	0–0	1–1	2–0	2–1	1–1	2–0	0–0
Vegpro	3–0	1–0	0–0		0–3	2–1	0–0	2–0	1–1	0–0	0–2	0–0	1–1	2–1	0–0	0–1
Kenya Commercial Bank	3–4	1–2	0–2	1–2		1–0	1–1	3–0	2–2	1–0	2–1	1–0	0–0	0–1	0–4	0–2
Mahakama	2–1	1–1	1–3	1–3	1–0		2–0	0–0	0–1	2–1	0–0	1–1	0–1	0–0	0–2	0–0
Mathare United	3–3	1–1	1–1	0–0	3–1	1–1		2–0	2–1	1–2	1–3	1–0	2–2	0–0	0–1	2–0
Nairobi City Stars	0–1	2–1	0–0	1–1	1–1	0–2	2–2		1–1	2–1	2–0	1–0	2–2	2–2	1–1	1–0
Posta Rangers	1–1	1–1	0–2	2–0	2–3	1–0	0–1	1–3		1–1	3–2	2–1	2–1	1–4	0–0	0–1
Red Berets	2–2	4–0	1–1	1–0	1–0	3–1	1–1	0–1	1–2		0–4	1–0	2–0	0–0	1–1	1–2
Sofapaka	0–1	0–0	1–1	1–0	2–0	1–1	0–0	3–0	1–1	0–0		2–0	3–0	1–1	0–0	4–2
SoNy Sugar	2–0	1–0	1–1	2–1	2–0	0–0	2–0	0–0	0–0	1–0	1–1		1–0	1–2	2–2	2–0
Thika United	0–0	2–0	0–1	0–1	1–0	1–0	1–1	1–0	0–0	1–0	0–0	2–1		1–3	1–1	2–0
Tusker	0–0	0–0	0–2	1–0	1–0	1–0	0–0	1–0	1–1	3–1	0–1	1–2	1–0		0–0	2–0
Ulinzi Stars	2–0	2–1	1–0	2–0	3–0	1–1	0–2	1–1	3–0	1–0	1–1	2–1	1–0	1–0		0–1
Western Stima	1–1	0–1	0–1	1–1	2–2	3–2	1–1	0–0	1–0	0–0	3–0	3–0	2–2	0–3	1–2	

Updated to match(es) played on 8 December 2010. Source: Kenyan Premier League
Legend: Blue = home team win; Yellow = draw; Red = away team win.

== See also ==
- 2010 Kenyan Super Cup
