= List of football stadiums in Kenya =

Stadiums In Kenya

The following is a list of football stadiums in Kenya, with a capacity of at least 4,000 spectators. Some stadiums used for other purposes like athletics, concerts, politics and cultural events.

== Current stadiums ==
#	Images	Stadium	Capacity	City	RF
1		Moi International Sports Centre	48,063	Kasarani	
2		Bukhungu Stadium	25,000	Kakamega	
3		Muhoroni Stadium	20,000	Muhoroni	
4		William Ole Ntimama Stadium	20,000	Narok	
5		Nyayo National Stadium	18,000	Nairobi	
6		Nairobi City Stadium	15,000	Nairobi	
7		Gusii Stadium	15,000	Kisii	
8		Kipchoge Keino Stadium	10,000	Eldoret	
9		Mombasa Municipal Stadium	10,000	Mombasa	
10		Afraha Stadium	8,200	Nakuru	
11		Chemelil Sports Complex	5,000	Chemelil	
12		Green Stadium Awendo	5,000	Awendo	
13		Naivasha Stadium	5,000	Naivasha	
14		Thika Municipal Stadium	5,000	Thika	
15		World Hope Stadium	5,000	Kawangware	
16		Ruaraka Stadium	4,000	Nairobi	

== Future stadiums ==
- Talanta Sports Stadium Still under construction

== See also ==
- List of African stadiums by capacity
- List of stadiums by capacity
- Lists of stadiums
- Football in Kenya
