= 2010–11 in Kenyan football =

2010–11 in Kenyan football may refer to:

- 2010 in Kenyan football
- 2011 in Kenyan football
