= 2008–09 in Kenyan football =

2008–09 in Kenyan football may refer to:

- 2008 in Kenyan football
- 2009 in Kenyan football
