= 2009–10 in Kenyan football =

2009–10 in Kenyan football may refer to:

- 2009 in Kenyan football
- 2010 in Kenyan football
