= 2013–14 in Kenyan football =

2013–14 in Kenyan football may refer to:

- 2013 in Kenyan football
- 2014 in Kenyan football
