= 2011–12 in Kenyan football =

2011–12 in Kenyan football may refer to:

- 2011 in Kenyan football
- 2012 in Kenyan football
