= 2012–13 in Kenyan football =

2012–13 in Kenyan football may refer to:

- 2012 in Kenyan football
- 2013 in Kenyan football
