= James Omondi =

Kenyan footballer (born 1980)

Personal information
- Full name: James Omondi Oduor
- Date of birth: 30 December 1980 (age 45)
- Place of birth: Nairobi, Kenya
- Height: 1.93 m (6 ft 4 in)
- Position: Forward

Youth career
- –2002: Sher Agencies

Senior career*
Years	Team	Apps	(Gls)
2002–2003	Sher Agencies		
2003–2005	Thika United		
2005	P. Sông Lam Nghệ An		
2005–2006	Saint-George SA		
2006–2007	Thika United		
2007–2009	Anse Réunion		
2009–2010	Mathare United	14	(2)

International career
2002–2004	Kenya	16	(7)

Managerial career
- 2011: Thika United (assistant coach)
- 2011–2012: Kenya Commercial Bank
- 2013–: Karuturi Sports
- * Club domestic league appearances and goals

James Omondi Oduor (born 30 December 1980) is a Kenyan football manager and former player who manages Kenyan National Super League club Karuturi Sports. He played as a forward.

== Club career ==
Born in Nairobi, Omondi began his career by Sher Agencies before left the team in 2003, to Thika United. After two years left 2005 Thika and move to Vietnamese club P. Sông Lam Nghệ An, in Vietnam played one year before moving to Ethiopian Premier League team Saint-George SA. After nine months he left Saint-George to move back to Thika United, where he played again for six months before moving to the Seychelles League with Anse Réunion. He left the Seychellois club in 2009 for Mathare United, where he ended his playing career.

== International career ==
He presented his country Kenya on international level from 2002 to 2004. He was also part of the team that took part in the 2004 Africa Cup of Nations.

== Managerial career ==
Coach Mahakama F.C Omondi had been the assistant coach of Thika United, where he played during his club career, but later became the assistant coach of Kenya Commercial Bank before being promoted to head coach after Leonard Swaleh was sacked with immediate effect. He was sacked by KCB on 28 November 2012, however, after his side finished tenth in the 2012 Kenyan Premier League season, and replaced by Abdallah Juma on 19 December.

On 3 April 2013, after the departure of Michael Nam to FKF Division One side FC Talanta on 14 March, Omondi took over as head coach of Karuturi Sports.

On 5 September 2019, he got his appointment as the Ushuru Football Club head coach after serving as the deputy head coach for a year and a half.
