= Francis Ouma =

Kenyan football player (born 1988)

Personal information
- Date of birth: March 23, 1988 (age 38)
- Place of birth: Kenya
- Height: 1.75 m (5 ft 9 in)
- Position: Striker

Team information
- Current team: Sony Sugar

Senior career*
Years	Team	Apps	(Gls)
2006–2008	Mathare United		
2008–2009	Azam FC		
2008–2009	Parma AC		
2009–2010	G.D. Tourizense		
2011	Sofapaka		
2011–2012	Mathare United		
2012–	Sony Sugar		

International career^{‡}
2008–2009	Kenya	15	(5)
- * Club domestic league appearances and goals ‡ National team caps and goals as of 20:38, 28 October 2021 (UTC)

Francis Ouma (born March 23, 1988) is a Kenyan football player who plays for Sony Sugar in the Tusker Premier League as a striker.

== Career ==
Ouma began his career with Mathare United, with whom he won the 2008 Kenyan Premier League and finished as top goalscorer, with 15 goals. He joined Parma after the end of the season. In 2009, he was loaned to G.D. Tourizense, but returned to Kenya 2 years later when he joined Sofapaka, before returning to his former club Mathare United in 2012. He finished the 2012 Kenyan Premier League season with 9 goals for his club, making him the joint 9th top scorer.

On 12 December 2012, Ouma signed for Sony Sugar for an undisclosed fee, along with his former Mathare United teammate John Kio.
