= Kisumu All Stars F.C. =

Kenyan football club

Kisumu All Stars
- Full name: Kisumu All Stars F.C.
- Nickname: The Blue Eagles
- Ground: Moi Stadium, Kisumu
- League: Kenyan National Super League
- 2025–26: 16th
Home colours	Away colours

Kisumu All Stars is an association football club based in Kisumu, Kenya. The club currently competes in the Kenyan Premier League.

== History ==
=== Kisumu All Stars (to 2010) ===
Kisumu All Stars were promoted to the Premier League in 1998. However, they were expelled from the league after a match-fixing scandal in which they lost a match 10–0. The original Kisumu All Stars were dissolved in 2010 after being administratively relegated from the Kenyan Premier League.

=== Kisumu All Stars (2018–present) ===
In 2018, the club were administratively promoted to the second division Kenyan National Super League to replace Palos FC, who had disbanded, effectively taking their place in the league.

The club had financial problems in 2018, leading to a situation where only eight players started a match away in Nairobi, which they lost 2–0. However, the club survived relegation, and received a Ksh1m boost from Silverstone Air for the 2019 season.

Kisumu finished in second place in the 2018–19 Kenyan National Super League season to earn promotion to the Kenyan top flight, beating out Nairobi Stima on goal difference.

The 2019–20 top flight side had new kits purchased for them by their sponsor, the Kisumu government.
