= Edgar Ochieng =

Kenyan footballer (born 1977)

Edgar Ochieng (Fighter) (born 2 November 1977) is a Kenyan defence footballer who was playing for Kenyan club Mathare United in the Kenyan Premier League Until his career ended.

== Career ==
In the past he has played for Omani football club, Dhofar, in Salalah, Oman. He has also played for Sofapaka.

== International career ==
He has played for the Kenya national football team.
