= Joseph Shikokoti =

Kenyan footballer (born 1985)

Personal information
- Date of birth: 8 August 1985 (age 41)
- Place of birth: Mombasa, Kenya
- Height: 2.00 m (6 ft 7 in)
- Position: Centre-back

Senior career*
Years	Team	Apps	(Gls)
2006–2014	Tusker		
2008–2010	→ Young Africans (loan)		
2014–2015	A.F.C. Leopards		
2015–2016	Ushuru		
2017–2020	Nairobi Stima		

International career
2008–2012	Kenya	11	(1)
- * Club domestic league appearances and goals

Joseph Shikokoti (born 8 August 1985) is a Kenyan former professional footballer who played as a centre-back.

Shikokoti is noted for his great height. At six feet seven inches, he is easily one of the tallest footballers around.

== Club career ==
In January 2014, Shikokoti joined AFC Leopards for a record KSh.700,000/= He scored his first goal for Ingwe on 29 January in a 6–0 victory over the Green Commandoes of Kakamega High School in a warm up match.

In June 2014, Shikokoti scored the equaliser against former club Tusker in the Meru Cup final after Lloyd Wahome had given Tusker the lead in the 12 minute.

== International career ==
Shikokoti has played for the Kenya national team at both the 2010 FIFA World Cup qualifiers and the 2014 FIFA World Cup qualifiers.
