= James Situma =

Kenyan footballer (born 1984)

Personal information
- Full name: James Wakhungu Situma
- Date of birth: 11 November 1984 (age 41)
- Place of birth: Ndivisi, Webuye Bungoma County, Kenya
- Height: 1.81 m (5 ft 11 in)
- Positions: Defensive midfielder; defender

Senior career*
Years	Team	Apps	(Gls)
2003–2006	Nzoia Sugar		
2006–2007	Nairobi City Stars		
2007–2011	Sofapaka		
2011–2012	KF Tirana	3	(0)
2012–2013	Sofapaka		
2014–2015	A.F.C. Leopards		
2015–2017	Tusker		

International career
2009–2016	Kenya	39	(2)
- * Club domestic league appearances and goals

James Wakhungu Situma (born 11 November 1984) is a Kenyan former professional footballer. Mostly a defensive midfielder, he was also deployed as a centre-back or right-back. He achieved great success in his first spell at Sofapaka before his move to KF Tirana, winning four trophies during his four years at the club including their first ever Kenya Premier League title as well as captaining the side in the CAF Champions League. At international level, he made 39 appearances for the Kenya national team scoring twice.

== Career ==
=== KF Tirana ===
Situma was born in Ndivisi, Bungoma, Kenya. He signed a two-year contract with KF Tirana on 2 July 2011, making him the first Kenyan to ever play in Albania. He made his Tirana debut in a UEFA Europa League qualifying match against Slovak side Spartak Trnava on 14 July 2011, he started the game in the centre of midfield and helped his side to a goal less draw.

Situma's first trophy in European and Albanian football came in just his second game, as he won the 2011 Albanian Supercup against the champions of Albania Skënderbeu Korçë in a 1–0 win.

=== Tusker ===
On 26 January 2015, it was announced that Situma joined Tusker from A.F.C. Leopards. He made his debut for Tusker in a 1–1 draw against Thika United at the Thika Municipal Stadium, on the side's first league game of the 2015 season on 21 February.

In December 2017 Situma was one of 14 players to be released by Tusker.

== Personal life ==
He is the second of three children to Japheth and Anne Wakhungu; his brothers' names are Alfred and Cyrus. His inspirations are Dennis Oliech and McDonald Mariga.

== Career statistics ==
Scores and results list Kenya's goal tally first, score column indicates score after each Situma goal.

List of international goals scored by James Situma
No.	Date	Venue	Opponent	Score	Result	Competition
1	9 January 2010	Moi International Sports Centre, Nairobi, Kenya	Cameroon	1–0	1–3	Friendly
2	9 February 2012	Nyayo National Stadium, Nairobi, Kenya	Togo	1–0	2–1	2013 Africa Cup of Nations qualification

== Honours ==
Sofapaka

- Kenyan Premier League: 2009
- Kenyan President's Cup: 2009
- Kenyan Super Cup: 2009, 2010

KF Tirana

- Albanian Supercup: 2011
