= Mathare Youth Sports Association =

Sports aid organization in Nairobi, Kenya

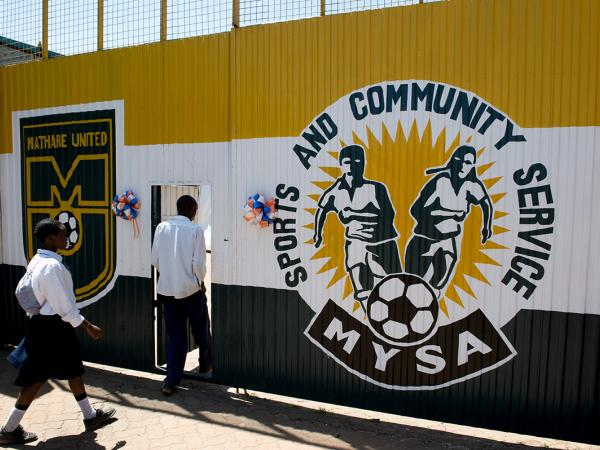
MYSA logo

Mathare Youth Sports Association (MYSA) is a sports development aid organization in Mathare, a collection of slums in Nairobi. In sports it focuses mainly on association football, and furthermore it is active in the field of community building.

== History and background ==
MYSA was founded in 1987 by Canadian Bob Munro (1942–2025) who was an advisor at the time for the United Nations in Nairobi, for environmental policy, water resources management and sustainable development. In Mathare children led him to a football field that was covered with flinders and trash. With cleaning the field the first step was made for MYSA.

On August 22, 1987, a youth competition was started with 27 clubs, Lucky Strikers Vs. Gwangi was the 1st match to be played at Center, goal scored by 6 year old Solomon 'Solo' Teklu was the 1st goal to be scored, but Gwangi won 2–1..

In 2010, 14,000 children in 1,200 teams are active. Meanwhile, MYSA has grown to be the greatest youth association of Africa.

Since 1992 there is football for girls as well, 1st Chairman of the league was from amongst the MYSA youths, 1st chairman was also Solomon 'Solo' Teklu, who was also the 15 years old coach of Mama Fatuma Children's home, a team made up of Orphans in Eastleigh, who were the inaugural Champions, and in 2006 one-third of the players at MYSA were girls.

MYSA has its own professional football club formed in 1994, Mathare United F.C., MYSA was a pipeline of talents that were selected as All-Stars from different MYSA teams to form Mathare United, players who joined MYSA at 6 yrs old became professional athletes, which meanwhile has provided numerous players to the national football team of Kenya. Football players Doreen Nabwire, Dennis Oliech of AJ Auxerre and Jamal Mohammed once started their careers at MYSA.

Mathare United started as Mathare Youth F.C, playing in local tournaments, winning the Coca-Cola for 3 consecutive seasons (1993 to 1996), Unbeaten in 38 games in the knockout tournament. It later became a feeder for Mathare United F.C. Players like Simon Kiongi, Osman Ngaiwa, Solomon Teklu, Duncan Ochieng, Edgar Ochieng, Late Edwardo Gallo, Charles Opiyo, Kennedy Kagwa, Peter Karanja, Maurice Wambua, Abdul Hack, 'Gaza', Late Peter Serry, Mathews Ottamax, Late John Magwe, John Mwaura, Don Bosco, Keseko, Zangi Omondi, and guided by MYSA officials like Tom Tumbo and Salim Mohammed, and Coach Leonard Saleh were the core of the resurgence of MYSA into a superpower.

Since its start, MYSA is dedicated to enhancing social proficiencies through the teaching of football. Children can score points at their participation in 'Clean Up Projects', and with matches they have won. Players can have their school expenses paid. When there is no place available at school, one can still use the library.

During theater plays there is also attention to instruction on AIDS, drugs and prostitution. Furthermore, it teaches leadership, photography, music, and more.

MYSA was twice nominated for a Nobel Peace Prize and is financially supported by the Royal Dutch Football Association and the Norwegian Strømme Foundation.

In 1999 MYSA won the UNEP Global 500 Award for environmental innovation and in 2001 the CAF/African Youth Development Award. In 2003 MYSA was honored with a Prince Claus Award from the Netherlands and in 2004 it received a Sport for Good Award of the Laureus World Sports Awards.

MYSA has moulded some of the Athletes, Artists, Activists, and Councillors known as MCA's, Products of MYSA have gone international, making a difference in Canada, United Kingdom, United States, and in Norway, Denmark, Belgium, Sweden, and also within the continent of Africa.
