= Naivasha Stadium =

Football stadium in Kenya

- Old Trafford
- Full name: Naivasha Stadium
- Former names: Sher Karuturi Limited Stadium; Sher Stadium
- Location: Naivasha, Kenya
- Capacity: 5,000

Tenants
- Karuturi Sports; Oserian F.C.

The Naivasha Stadium is a football stadium in Naivasha, Kenya. It is the home stadium of Karuturi Sports and Oserian F.C., both competing in the Kenyan Premier League, and holds 5,000 people. It is located along the Moi South Lake Road.

The stadium is nicknamed "Old Trafford", after the home stadium of English Premier League club Manchester United.
