= Dagoretti Santos F.C. =

Kenyan football club

Dagoretti Green Santos
- Full name: Dagoretti Green Santos Football Club
- Founded: 1980
- Ground: Nairobi City Stadium
- Capacity: 15,000
- League: Kenyan National Super League
Home colours	Away colours

Santos is a Kenyan professional football club, based in Nairobi, which competes in FKF Division One. It competed in the Kenyan National Super League in 2008.

The club was formerly known as Dagoretti Green Santos.

== Notable former players ==
- Dennis Oliech
