= Homegrown F.C. =

Kenyan football club

Homegrown Football Club was a football club in Naivasha, Kenya. . In the 2006–07 season they played in the top level of Kenyan professional football, the Kenyan Premier League, but were relegated. Since 2008 the team has played in the Nationwide League.

In 2011, the team's owners, Homegrown Horticulture Company, were acquired by the Finlays Horticulture Company and as such the team's name was changed to Finlays Horticulture Association Football Club, which competed in FKF Division One before gaining promotion to the newly formed Kenyan National Super League at the end of the 2013 season.
