= Francis Kimanzi =

Kenyan football coach (born 1976)

Personal information
- Date of birth: 29 May 1976 (age 50)
- Place of birth: Kitui, Kenya

Team information
- Current team: Wazito (manager)

Senior career*
Years	Team	Apps	(Gls)
1994–2002	Mathare United		

Managerial career
- 2002–2010: Mathare United
- 2008–2009: Kenya
- 2011: Sofapaka
- 2011–2012: Kenya
- 2013–2015: Tusker
- 2015–2019: Mathare United
- 2019–2020: Kenya
- 2020–: Wazito
- 2024–2025: Kenya (interim)
- * Club domestic league appearances and goals

Francis Kimanzi (born 29 May 1976) is a Kenyan football coach who manages Wazito.

== Playing career ==
Kimanzi played club football for Mathare United between 1994 and 2002, before becoming manager.

== Coaching career ==
Kimanzi was appointed full-time manager of the Kenyan national side on 11 December 2008, having held the post as a caretaker since May 2008. He was sacked from the post of national team coach after the 2008 CECAFA Cup in January 2009 due to disputes between him and Kenyan football administrators. After a one-year spell coaching club side Sofapaka, he was reappointed as head coach of the Kenyan national team in November 2011. In June 2012 he was sacked as manager of Kenya alongside his entire coaching staff after Kenya failed to qualify for the 2013 African Nations Cup.

After coaching Tusker, he returned to Mathare United as manager in 2015. In August 2019 he was linked with a return to the Kenya national team. He returned to the Kenyan national team as manager in August 2019. Kimanzi has publicly spoken out against foreign coaches in Africa. In October 2020, he was dismissed from coaching Kenya. In November 2020 he became manager of Wazito.

He served as interim manager of Kenya from late 2024 until March 2025.
