= Iron Strikers F.C. =

Kenyan football club

Iron Strikers
- Full name: Iron Strikers Football Club
- Ground: Apostle Grounds
- Capacity: ?
- League: Kenyan Provincial League
- 2012: FKF Division One, 19th (Zone A) (relegated)

Iron Strikers is an association football club based in Mombasa, Kenya. The club competes in the Kenyan Provincial League, and plays its home games at the Apostle Grounds.
