= Football Kenya Limited =

CAF
- Founded: 2008
- Folded: 2011
- FIFA affiliation: 2008
- CAF affiliation: 2008
- CECAFA affiliation: 2008

Football Kenya Limited (abbreviated as Football Kenya Ltd., Football Kenya or FKL) was the governing body of football in Kenya. It was founded in 2008 and was recognised by FIFA in the same year, taking over control of Kenyan football from the Kenya Football Federation. FKL organised the Kenya Premier League (KPL), the Kenyan Nationwide League and the Kenya national football team. It was headed by Sam Nyamweya, who was voted in through an election that involved all Kenyan football clubs in 2011, beating six other candidates including KFF chairman Mohamed Hatimy.

== Leadership disputes with KFF ==
FKL was formed in 2008 by a group of football administrators to rival then governing body, the Kenya Football Federation, and was immediately recognised by FIFA as the governing body of Kenyan football. This led the KFF to sue FIFA for failing to recognize it and extending its (FIFA's) support to a limited liability company. The KFF also appealed to the Court of Arbitration for Sport (CAS) for a proper ruling. On 27 April 2010, CAS dismissed the KFF's appeal and asked FIFA to continue recognising FKL as the governing body of Kenyan football.

== Replacement by FKF ==
In November 2011, FKL was disbanded as it wanted to cease being a limited company. The Football Kenya Federation (FKF) replaced FKL, but most of the new executive positions were retained by their former occupants on FKL.
