= John Baraza =

Kenyan footballer (born 1974)

Personal information
- Date of birth: 3 June 1974 (age 52)
- Place of birth: Naivasha, Kenya
- Height: 1.76 m (5 ft 9 in)
- Position: Striker

Senior career*
Years	Team	Apps	(Gls)
1994–2002	Oserian Fastac		
2002–2003	Tusker		
2003	IF Sylvia	23	(0)
2003–2005	Chemelil Sugar		
2005–2006	Young Africans		
2006–2007	Royal Malaysia Police		
2007–2008	Rayon Sports		
2009	Sofapaka		
2009	Chemelil Sugar		
2010–2015	Sofapaka	169	(63)

International career
2002–2011	Kenya	52	(21)
- * Club domestic league appearances and goals

John Baraza (born 3 June 1974) is a Kenyan former footballer who played as a striker. He represented Kenya at the 2004 Africa Cup of Nations.

Scores and results list Kenya's goal tally first, score column indicates score after each Baraza goal.

List of international goals scored by John Baraza
No.	Date	Venue	Opponent	Score	Result	Competition	Ref.
1	11 May 2002	Moi International Sports Centre, Nairobi, Kenya	Tanzania	1-0	1-0	Friendly	
2	18 May 2002	Sheikh Amri Abeid Memorial Stadium, Arusha, Tanzania	Tanzania	1-0	5-0	Friendly	
3	18 May 2002	Sheikh Amri Abeid Memorial Stadium, Arusha, Tanzania	Tanzania	3-0	5-0	Friendly	
4	7 September 2002	Moi International Sports Centre, Nairobi, Kenya	Togo	1-0	3-0	2004 African Cup of Nations qualification	
5	12 October 2002	Estádio da Várzea, Praia, Cape Verde	Cape Verde	1-0	1-0	2004 African Cup of Nations qualification	
6	26 October 2002	Uhuru Stadium, Dar es Salaam, Tanzania	Uganda	1-1	1-1	Friendly	
7	6 December 2002	Uhuru Stadium, Dar es Salaam, Tanzania	Eritrea	1-0	4-1	2002 CECAFA Cup	
8	6 December 2002	Uhuru Stadium, Dar es Salaam, Tanzania	Eritrea	4-1	4-1	2002 CECAFA Cup	
9	14 December 2002	Uhuru Stadium, Dar es Salaam, Tanzania	Tanzania	2-2	3-2	2002 CECAFA Cup	
10	2 February 2004	Stade 15 Octobre, Bizerte, Tunisia	Burkina Faso	3-0	3-0	2004 African Cup of Nations	
11	7 August 2004	Nakivubo Stadium, Kampala, Uganda	Uganda	1-1	1-1	Friendly	
12	18 August 2004	Nairobi City Stadium, Nairobi, Kenya	Uganda	1-0	4-1	Friendly	
13	18 August 2004	Nairobi City Stadium, Nairobi, Kenya	Uganda	2-0	4-1	Friendly	
14	4 September 2004	Moi International Sports Centre, Nairobi, Kenya	Malawi	1-0	3-2	2006 FIFA World Cup qualification	
15	4 September 2004	Moi International Sports Centre, Nairobi, Kenya	Malawi	3-0	3-2	2006 FIFA World Cup qualification	
16	12 December 2004	Addis Ababa Stadium, Addis Ababa, Ethiopia	Sudan	2-1	2-2	2004 CECAFA Cup	
17	14 December 2004	Addis Ababa Stadium, Addis Ababa, Ethiopia	Somalia	1-0	1-0	2004 CECAFA Cup	
18	25 December 2004	Addis Ababa Stadium, Addis Ababa, Ethiopia	Sudan	1-2	1-2	2004 CECAFA Cup	
19	23 March 2005	Moi International Sports Centre, Nairobi, Kenya	Ghana	1-1	2-2	Friendly	
20	5 December 2009	Nyayo National Stadium, Nairobi, Kenya	Ethiopia	1-0	2-0	2009 CECAFA Cup	
21	29 November 2010	Benjamin Mkapa Stadium, Dar es Salaam, Tanzania	Malawi	1-2	2-3	2010 CECAFA Cup	
