= Real Kisumu F.C. =

Kenyan football club

Real Kisumu
- Full name: Real Kisumu Football Club
- Ground: Moi Stadium; Kisumu, Kenya
- Capacity: 6,000
- League: FKF Division One

Real Kisumu is an association football club based in Kisumu, Kenya. The team plays its home games at the Moi Stadium.

In 2012, the club was promoted to Kenyan Nationwide League, from the Kenyan Provincial League.
