= Thika Municipal Stadium =

- Full name: Thika Municipal Stadium
- Location: Thika, Kenya
- Capacity: 5,000

Tenant
- Thika United

The Thika Municipal Stadium is a multi-purpose stadium in Thika, Kenya. It used mostly for football matches and is the home stadium of Thika United F.C. The stadium holds 5,000 people.

In March 2020, a proposal was tabled by the county assembly of Kiambu to rename the stadium after long-serving mayor Douglas Mundia, who served from 1968, when Thika was first declared a municipality, to 1992.
