= Oserian F.C. =

Kenyan football club

- Full name: Oserian Football Club
- Ground: Oserian Grounds, Naivasha
- Head coach: (Kenya) Sammy Omollo
- League: National Super League
- 2013: 1st (Zone B, Group 2); Promotion play-off losers (promoted)

Oserian Football Club is a professional football club based in Naivasha, Kenya. The club competes in the Kenyan National Super League.

== History ==
Oserian F.C. were promoted to the Kenyan Premier League after winning the FKL Nationwide League in 2011, but were relegated again after finishing 15th in 2012. Under the name Oserian Fastac, it won two Premier League titles, but was forced to briefly wind up operations when its backers pulled out. This meant that the club had to start again from the bottom tier in order to return to the Premier League. Their major rivals are Karuturi Sports, with whom they share the Naivasha derby.

The club also has a women's football section that competes in the Kenyan Women's Premier League.
