= Nairobi Stima F.C. =

Kenyan football club

Nairobi Stima
- Full name: Nairobi Stima
- Ground: Nairobi City Stadium
- Capacity: 20,000
- Chairman: Johnstone Sakwa
- Head coach: Evans Mafuta
- League: Kenyan National Super League
- 2019: 3rd
Home colours

Nairobi Stima is an association football club based in Nairobi, Kenya. The club competes in the Kenyan National Super League.

== History ==
Manager George Owoko led Nairobi Stima to an undefeated first half of the season in 2018–19, but was suspended by management in April 2019 and left the club that June. Assistant coach Evans Mafuta took over as manager.

Stima finished 3rd in 2019 and qualified for the promotion/relegation playoff, but lost to top flight Posta Rangers 3–2 on aggregate and remained in the second division. Nairobi Stima only lost two league matches that year, but missed out on promotion by goal difference to Kisumu All Stars.

== Seasons ==
Season	Tier	Position	G	W	D	L	GF	GA	Pts
2012	2nd	8/20	37	13	14	10	46	39	53
2013	2nd	5/12	22	9	11	2	32	14	38
2014	2nd	5/12	22	8	7	7	20	18	31
2015	2nd	12/18	31	8	11	12	34	37	35
2016	2nd	9/20	38	13	13	12	39	35	52
2017	2nd	5/19	36	20	10	6	45	23	70
2018	2nd	6/19	35	14	10	11	43	35	52
2018–19	2nd	3/20	38	22	14	2	64	33	80

Source: RSSSF; 2017 Soccerway

== Stadium ==
The team currently plays its home games at the 15,000-capacity Nairobi City Stadium.
