= Kenyan Regional Leagues =

- Country: Kenya
- Confederation: CAF
- Divisions: 8
- Level on pyramid: 4
- Promotion to: Division One
- Relegation to: County Champions League
- Domestic cup: President's Cup

The Kenyan Regional Leagues are the fourth tier in the Kenyan football league system. They have a promotion and relegation system with FKF Division One and the Kenyan County Champions League, and consists of 8 regional leagues.

From the beginning of the 2014 season, the Kenyan Regional Leagues (previously known as the Kenyan Provincial Leagues) were taken down from the third tier to give way to the Kenyan National Super League, the new second tier, now putting them below FKF Division One and above the Kenyan County Champions League, in line with the introduction of a new six-tier system by the Football Kenya Federation to take effect from the beginning of that season.

== Competition ==
There are 8 regional leagues based on the former Provinces of Kenya, some of which are further divided into a number of zones. Based on the size of the league, the best teams from each zone play in a promotion play-off league, and the winners of the play-off league are promoted to their corresponding zone in Division One.

For the 2013 season, all 7 promotion play-off league winners would be promoted to their corresponding zones in Division One, in addition to the two relegated teams from the Premier League, given the disbandment of Mathare Youth late in the 2012 FKF Division One season.

== Divisions and sub-divisions ==
=== Eastern Half ===
- Coast Regional League
- Eastern Regional League
- Nairobi Regional League
- North Eastern Regional League

=== Western Half ===
- Central Province Regional League
- Nyanza Regional League
- Rift Valley Regional League
- Western Regional League

== See also ==
- Kenyan football league system
