= Football in Kenya =

- Country: Kenya
- Governing body: Football Kenya Federation
- National team: Kenya

National competitions
- FIFA World Cup; FIFA Confederations Cup; Africa Cup of Nations; African Nations Championship; CECAFA Cup

Club competitions
- List: League: Premier League National Super League Division One Regional Leagues County Champions League Sub-County Leagues; Cups: President's Cup Top 8 Cup Super Cup

International competitions
- FIFA Club World Cup; CAF Champions League; CAF Confederation Cup

Association football is the most popular sport in Kenya, followed by rugby. Around 45% of Kenyans are considered football fans.

The governing body of football in Kenya is the Football Kenya Federation.

The Kenyan Premier League is the only fully professional league in the country, while the Kenyan National Super League is a mix of professional and semi-professional clubs.

== Kenyan football on television ==
Football is shown on television in the following channels:

- SuperSport / KBC - Kenyan Premier League, Kenyan National Super League, FKF President's Cup, Kenyan Super Cup, KPL Top 8 Cup, UEFA Champions League, UEFA Europa League, English Premier League, Italian Serie A, German Bundesliga, French Ligue 1, FIFA Club World Cup, Copa del Rey, Supercopa de España, FA Cup, EFL Cup FA Community Shield, Coupe de France, CAF Champions League, CAF Confederation Cup, FIFA World Cup, UEFA European Championship
- Setanta Africa / Zuku Sports - French Ligue 1, Dutch Eredivisie, Belgian Pro League, Mexican Liga MX, Copa Libertadores, Copa Sudamericana, Major League Soccer, Africa Cup of Nations

== League system ==
=== Men ===
There is a three-tier league system, with provincial, county and sub-county leagues below used to promote clubs to national leagues.

Level	League/Division(s)							
1 Premier League	Kenyan Premier League; 18 clubs							
2 Super League	Kenyan National Super League; 20 clubs							
3 Division One	Zone A 14 clubs				Zone B 14 clubs			
4 Division Two	Western Zone; 15 clubs		Central Zone; 30 clubs		Eastern Zone; 24 clubs		Northern Zone; 15 clubs	
5 Regional Leagues	Nyanza League; 20 clubs	Western League; 20 clubs	Rift Valley League; 20 clubs	Central League; 20 clubs	Nairobi League; 20 clubs	Eastern League; 20 clubs	North Eastern League; 20 clubs	Coast League; 20 clubs
6 County; Champions League	Baringo League	Bomet League	Bungoma League	Busia League	Embu League	Garissa League	Isiolo League	Kiambu League
6 County; Champions League	Elgeyo-Marakwet League	Homa Bay League	Kajiado League	Kakamega League	Kilifi League	Kirinyaga League	Kitui League	Kwale League
6 County; Champions League	Kericho League	Kisii League	Kisumu League	Laikipia League	Lamu League	Machakos League	Makueni League	Mandera League
6 County; Champions League	Migori League	Nakuru League	Nandi League	Narok League	Marsabit League	Meru League	Mombasa League	Murang'a League
6 County; Champions League	Nyamira League	Samburu League	Siaya League	Trans-Nzoia League	Nairobi A. League	Nairobi B. League	Nyandarua League	Nyeri League
6 County; Champions League	Turkana League	Uasin Gishu League	Vihiga League	West Pokot League	Taita-Taveta League	Tana River League	Tharaka-Nithi League	Wajir League
7 Sub-County Leagues	Sub-County Leagues							

=== Women ===
- Kenyan Women's Premier League
- FKF Women's Division One
- Copa Del Kenya

== Seasons in Kenyan football ==
The following articles detail the major results and events in each season since 1963, when the first organised Kenyan competition, the Premier League, was created.

1960s:				1963	1964	1965	1966	1967	1968	1969
1970s:	1970	1971	1972	1973	1974	1975	1976	1977	1978	1979
1980s:	1980	1981	1982	1983	1984	1985	1986	1987	1988	1989
1990s:	1990	1991	1992	1993	1994	1995	1996	1997	1998	1999
2000s:	2000	2001	2002	2003	2004	2005	2006	2007	2008	2009
2010s:	2010	2011	2012	2013	2014	2015	2016	2017	2018	2019

== Football stadiums in Kenya ==
A minimum capacity of 5,000 is required for this list.

Rank	Stadium	City	Capacity	Tenants	Image
1	Moi International Sports Centre Stadium	Nairobi	55,000	Kenya national football team, Gor Mahia F.C.	
2	William Ole Ntimama Stadium	Narok	20,000		
3	Nyayo National Stadium	Nairobi	18,000	A.F.C. Leopards	
4	Jomo Kenyatta International Stadium	Kisumu	15,000		
5	Kinoru Stadium	Meru	15,000		
6	Ithookwe Stadium	Kitui	10,000		
7	Afraha Stadium	Nakuru	8,200	Ulinzi Stars F.C.	

== Support ==
Twitter research from 2015 found that the most popular English Premier League club in Kenya was Arsenal, with 31% of Kenyan Premier League fans following the club, followed by Manchester United (23%) and Chelsea (17%).

== Attendances ==
The average attendance per top-flight football league season and the club with the highest average attendance:

Season	League average	Best club	Best club average
2023-24	478	AFC Leopards	2,212

Source: League page on Wikipedia

== See also ==
- List of football clubs in Kenya
- Lists of stadiums
