= Nairobi City Stadium =

Stadium in Nairobi, Kenya

- Interactive map of Nairobi City Stadium
- Full name: Nairobi City Stadium
- Former names: African Stadium; Donholm Road Stadium; Jogoo Road Stadium
- Location: Nairobi, Kenya
- Coordinates: 1°17′32″S 36°50′32″E
- Owner: Nairobi City Council
- Capacity: 15,000

Tenants
- Gor Mahia; Kariobangi Sharks; Kenya Commercial Bank; Mahakama

Nairobi City Stadium is a multi-purpose stadium in Nairobi, Kenya. It is located east of the city centre. The stadium is owned by the Nairobi City Council.

== Overview ==
The stadium was originally known as African Stadium, then renamed Donholm Road Stadium. It was renamed to Jogoo Road Stadium after Kenya gained independence in 1963 and finally to Nairobi City Stadium.

It was the principal stadium in Nairobi until the 1980s when Nyayo National Stadium and Moi International Sports Centre were built. It is used mostly for football matches and is the home stadium of the traditional Gor Mahia and some other local clubs. The stadium has a capacity of 15,000 people.

Probably the highest profile athletics competition held at Nairobi City Stadium was the Jomo Kenyatta memorial meeting in 1979. International athletes like Edwin Moses, Alberto Salazar and Henry Rono participated.

According to press reports, City stadium is set to have the first artificial turf in Kenya. The project will be funded by FIFA . This synthetic turf pitch, called Xtreme Turf, is manufactured and installed by ACT Global Sports.
