= Red Berets F.C. =

Kenyan football club

Red Berets
- Full name: Red Berets Football Club
- Nickname(s): Kenya Police
- Founded: 1980
- Dissolved: 2011
- Ground: Afraha Stadium; Nakuru, Kenya
- Capacity: 8,200
- Manager: Caleb Okuku
- 2010: Kenyan Premier League, 15th
Home colours

Red Berets Football Club was a football club based in Nakuru, Kenya. It was based in Nairobi until 2007.

== Stadium ==
Its home ground was the Afraha Stadium, but due to its unavailability in 2008, the club played its home games at the Greensteds School Grounds.

== History ==
The club was founded in 1980 is and owned by the Kenya Police. In 2000, it won promotion from the Nationwide League to the Premier League, where it stayed until they were relegated at the end of the 2010 season, after which it was disbanded as it was under immense pressure from its sponsors to produce good performances, contrary to the season they had.

The coaches that have been at the helm include Coach Martin Asin (deceased), Coach Said (deceased) Coach Kiragu Mwangi, Coach Gideon Ambani, Coach Caleb Okuku among others. Some of the notable players include Gibson Koluma, Peter Onyango, Joseph Asuza, Leonard Autai, Rexine Ogoli, Wycliffe Kasaya, Erick Ochieng, Samuel Kiarie, Shem Nyaberi, Geoffrey Otieno, Wakhu, Kamanga, Washington Odundo, Alex Njenga, Peter, Orupia, Abiud, Ndeche, Owira, Hassan, Mraja, Gabriel Nduro and Peter Muthui.
