= Vegpro F.C. =

Kenyan football club

Vegpro
- Former Karuturi Sports logo
- Full name: Vegpro Football Club
- Founded: 1994
- Ground: Naivasha Stadium; Naivasha, Kenya
- Capacity: 5,000
- Head coach: (Kenya) Michael Nam
- League: FKF Division One
- 2014: Kenyan National Super League, Zone B, 12th (relegated)
Home colours

Vegpro is a Kenyan football club based in Naivasha. They currently compete in the Kenyan National Super League, the second tier of Kenyan football. They play their home games at the Naivasha Stadium.

The club was founded in 1994 as Sher Agencies Football Club. In 2002 it played in the Nationwide League and won promotion to the Premier League with the help of two notable names: Anthony Wekesa and Jacob Abu Omondi who were the force behind their promotion.

The club was formerly owned by Sher Karuturi Limited, the largest flower producer in Kenya, a subsidiary of Karuturi Global Limited, an Indian company. The company is a producer of cut roses with an area of over 200 hectares under Greenhouse cultivation and an annual production capacity of around 500 million stems. Until November 2014, the club was known as Karuturi Sports Club, when the club was taken over by a multinational fresh produce, flowers and logistics company known as the VP Group.

Vegpro's major rivals are Oserian, with whom they are part of the Naivasha derby.
