= Mathare Youth F.C. =

Kenyan football club

Mathare Youth
- Full name: Mathare Youth Football Club
- Dissolved: 31 August 2012
- Ground: Ruaraka Sports Ground; Nairobi, Kenya
- Capacity: 4,000
- Chairman: Peter Karanja
- Manager: David Ouma
Home colours

Mathare Youth Football Club was a football club based in Nairobi, Kenya. It played in the Kenyan Premier League but was relegated in 2008. It last competed in the FKF Division One, the third tier of Kenyan football.

The club was owned by the Mathare Youth Sports Association. The club served as a feeder team for Mathare United, until Mathare Youth were promoted to the Premier League.

On 31 August 2012, the team disbanded and therefore pulled out of the 2012 FKF Division One, after which the Football Kenya Federation decided to nullify all of its second round results. This meant that all teams that had played against them had their points revoked or given back, depending on the results of the matches, and all upcoming fixtures involving them were cancelled.
