= Mahakama F.C. =

Kenyan football club

Mahakama
- Full name: Mahakama Football Club
- Founded: 2000
- Ground: Judiciary Training Institute; Nairobi, Kenya
- Capacity: 10,000
- Manager: Dancan Odima
- League: National Super League
- 2013: 6th (Zone A, Group 1) (promoted)
Home colours

Mahakama Football Club is a football club in Nairobi, Kenya. The club competed in the top level of Kenyan professional football, the Kenyan Premier League, but were relegated in 2008. It was founded in 2000 and is owned by the Judiciary of Kenya ("Mahakama" is Kiswahili for court).

In 2009, the team won the Nationwide League, earning a promotion back to the Premier League.
