= Mathare United F.C. =

Kenyan football club

Mathare United
- Full name: Mathare United FC
- Nickname: Home of Slum Boys
- Founded: 1994; 32 years ago
- Ground: Moi International Sports Centre
- Capacity: 48,063
- Owner: Mathare Youth Sports Association
- Chairman: Bob Munro
- League: Kenyan Premier League
- 2025–26: 14th
- Website: http://www.mathareunitedfc.com/
Home colours	Away colours

Mathare United Football Club is a professional football club based in Nairobi, Kenya. The club competed in the Kenyan Premier League (the highest tier of the Kenyan football league system), but in 2023, the club was relegated to the second division, National Super League. Established in 1994, Mathare United won its first league title in the 2008 season. The team plays its home matches at the Moi International Sports Centre in Kasarani.

== Achievements ==
- Kenyan Premier League: 1

2008

- Kenyan President's Cup: 2

1998, 2000

== Performance in CAF competitions ==
- CAF Champions League: 1 appearance

2009 – Preliminary Round

- CAF Cup: 1 appearance

2002 – First Round

- CAF Cup Winners' Cup: 2 appearances

1999 – Second Round
2001 – First Round

== Mathare Youth F.C. ==
Mathare Youth F.C. served as a feeder team for Mathare United until it was promoted to the Premier League, where it became a rival. In August 2012, the team was disbanded. The club's league season was sponsored by Triple5Bet, a sports betting company in Kenya.

== Women's Club ==
The club also has a women's football section called Mathare United Ladies' Football Club, which currently competes in the Kenyan Women's Premier League.
