= Kenyan Nationwide League =

Kenyan football league

The Kenyan Nationwide League was the second-division football league in Kenya, until it was replaced by FKF Division One. There is promotion and relegation with the Kenyan Premier League and the Kenyan Provincial League.

== History ==
In 2008 Nationwide league was divided into two zones with 16 teams each. In 2009 the league was again structured to contain two levels, Nationwide League Division One and Nationwide League Division Two, representing the second and third levels of Kenyan league system respectively. Nationwide League Division One has one zone (16 teams) and Nationwide League Division Two has two zones. The leagues were later renamed after the league's governing bodies. Division One was renamed the FKL Nationwide League and Division Two became the KFF Nationwide League. Following the merger of the two rival Football governing bodies, Football Kenya and Kenya Football Federation into "Football Kenya Federation", the two leagues are to be merged into A single "Kenya National Division One", divided into two 16 team zones, each promoting one team into the Kenyan Premier League. Both leagues became defunct after the 2011 season and were joined to make FKF Division One.

== See also ==
- Kenyan football league system
