= Ligi Ndogo S.C. =

Ligi Ndogo
- Full name: Ligi Ndogo Sports Club
- Nicknames: The Planets, Ligi
- Founded: 2005
- Ground: Ligi Ndogo Grounds, Nairobi, Kenya
- Capacity: 2,000
- Chairman: Chris Amimo
- League: FKF Division One
- 2014: Kenyan National Super League; 6th (Zone A)
- Website: www.ligindogo.com
| Home colours | Away colours | Third colours |

Ligi Ndogo Soccer Club (pronounced [liɡi ˈⁿdoːɡo] or [liɡi ˈⁿdɔːɡo]; also known as The Planets or simply Ligi) is a football club and youth academy based in Nairobi, Kenya. The senior team competes in the National Super League, the second tier of the Kenyan football league system. The club's name is Swahili for "little league".

The club's youth academy was founded by chairman Chris Amimo and Karani Nyamu in February 2002, and in 2005, the first senior team was formed and has played at Ligi Ndogo Grounds along Ngong Road since then. The team briefly used the Nairobi City Stadium in 2012 for its home games while their Ngong Road grounds were undergoing renovations.

== History ==
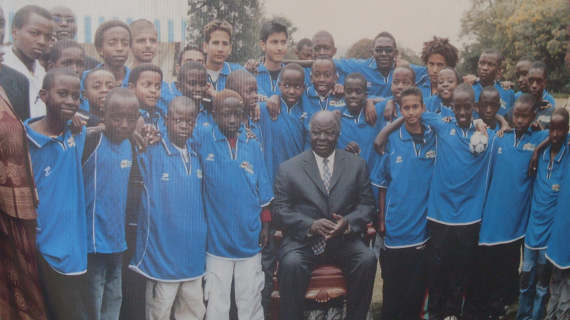
Ligi Ndogo players with former President Mwai Kibaki at State House in 2005

The senior football team was formed in 2005 with the initiative of current academy director and former senior team coach, Ibrahim Mbikalo, and club chairman Chris Amimo at the insistence of players Karim Rersa, Mohamed Junaid and Azim Butt. On arrival from a tour of the United Kingdom, the team members found themselves overage and with no category to fill in since the youth academy could only accommodate those below fourteen years of age. Under the guidance of Mbikalo, Ligi Ndogo gained their first honours by winning the Private Secondary Schools' League in 2005. They played in the Kiko Cup towards the end of the year, crashing out through a 3–2 loss to Kibera Combined on spot kicks. The team entered the second division of the Nationwide League in 2006, afterwards gaining promotion to the first division. The original team that was formed during the 2005 season included Junaid, Rersa, Butt and several other players. Genk forward Ayub Masika and former Tusker striker Jesse Were both featured for the team briefly. In its effort to pool talent, the team began to bring in non-academy players in 2006.

In the Nationwide League Second Division, the team went unbeaten in their first season, winning 20 matches without a loss to gain promotion to the First Division. During the course of the season, the team played several tournaments, most notably the Odiso Cup, in which they reached the semi-finals against Toito.

Ligi Ndogo claimed their first major honour when they won the Anti-Corruption Cup in 2009, beating Kariobangi Sharks 1–0 in the final at the Nairobi Technical Institute, and in 2010, the team played in the KFF Nationwide League, finishing second behind Dandora Youth. The following season, they again finished second, this time behind Muhoroni Youth, who were promoted to the Premier League under controversial circumstances. Former Kenya Football Federation chairman Mohammed Hatimy termed their promotion as "unconstitutional".

In 2012, Ligi Ndogo began competing in the newly formed FKF Division One. On 24 May, head coach Ibrahim Mbikalo stepped down to coach the club's under-15, under-16 and under-17 sides, and was replaced by Michael Kamure. Kamure won his first match with the club, as Ligi Ndogo beat Iron Strikers 3–2 away from home on 19 May 2012. The team went on to win 9 more matches that season, culminating in a sixth-place finish, 22 points behind leaders Bandari. The following season, Kamure led Ligi Ndogo to 5 more wins before leaving in September 2013. Bernard Ndichu, his temporary replacement, helped the team finish fourth in the Zone A (Group 1) table, and thus gained promotion to the newly formed National Super League. Former Nairobi City Stars coach Oliver Page, who had joined the club in 2011 as a technical advisor at the academy, took over the senior team in 2014. His first match in charge ended in a 1–1 draw at home against Kariobangi Sharks.

== Youth academy ==
The youth academy was established by current chairman Chris Amimo and Karani Nyamu on 1 January 2002, with operations beginning in February the same year. It fields teams from under-9 to under-19 level that participate in various national and international competitions, but also accommodates boys and girls from the age of four upwards. Notable former graduates of the academy include Sweden international John Guidetti and Kenya international Ayub Masika.

== Centres ==
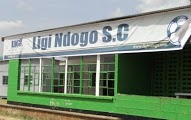
The Ligi Ndogo club house pictured in 2011.

The main clubhouse is situated at the Ligi Ndogo Grounds (formerly Unga Grounds), where the team plays its home games. The clubhouse was started by the Espositos, two brothers from the Kenyan coastal town of Lamu, and briefly hosted Italian Serie A giants Juventus when they toured Kenya in 1963. Ligi Ndogo now has four centres, namely:

- Karen – situated on Karen C road inside the Nairobi Academy opposite the DePaul Centre. The centre draws membership from Hardy, Karen, Lang'ata, estates around the Bomas of Kenya, Kiserian, Ngong' and its environs. The expansive centre also serves to identify, nurture and provide an opportunity for kids to interact, play and get rightful guidance on soccer skills under a guiding curriculum. It also offers a sponsorship opportunity to a percentage of the kids from less fortunate backgrounds.
- Ngong' Road – the first centre, it serves areas around Ngong Road, Kilimani, Dagoretti, Lavington, Jamhuri and Hurlingham. Apart from identifying talented young footballers and fostering their talents, its other objectives are to narrow the gap between fortunate and less fortunate Nairobi communities through common sports.
- South B – the centre opened its doors in 2005. It is situated inside the expansive Railway Training Institute. It serves areas of South B, Hazina, South C, Imara Daima, estates around Mombasa Road, Embakasi, Nyayo Estate, Buru Buru, Doonholm and Komarock. With its compassing curriculum, it has trained boys who have featured both nationally and internationally. Solomon Mbiti earned good reviews as part of the Ligi Ndogo team that travelled to Keele, Manchester in 2007 and 2009. Many others have gone on to feature at school level. Said Bakari from South B is currently featuring in the Ligi Ndogo U16 planets.
- Gigiri (until 2012) – situated at the German School Nairobi. It was started in October 2008 as part of the expansion program, when Ligi Ndogo leased the grounds from the school. It aimed to identify talented, young Kenyan footballers in the upper-class areas of Nairobi and foster their talents. It was designed to cater for the regions of Gigiri, Runda, Rosslyn etc., but also has a bursary program that served the less fortunate from Muchatha and Banana Hill areas. It offered attractive and safe venues for practice and games. This centre provided children with an opportunity to competent training and guidance in football, with an enrollment of 44 players. In 2012, since German School Nairobi did not extend Ligi Ndogo's lease of the grounds, the sports academy was forced to discontinue the centre as part of its programme. Shortly thereafter, German School itself started its own football programme at the same venue.

== Club colours and logos ==
Ligi Ndogo's home colors are cobalt blue, while its away colours are tangerine yellow. Kit colors have been green and lime but was changed to the original senior team colors. The origins of the club's home colors are their title sponsors when they toured the UK in 2008. The team first wore the cobalt blue and tangerine yellow when it played in the Umbro International Cup (now the Keele International Cup) in Manchester, England. The current club logo was adopted in 2005. It was originally in grey and black but went through a series of modifications.

Logos

Ligi Ndogo logos

Crests

Ligi Ndogo crests

== Current squad ==
As of the beginning of the 2018 season.

Note: Flags indicate national team as defined under FIFA eligibility rules; some limited exceptions apply. Players may hold more than one non-FIFA nationality.

| No. | Pos. | Nation | Player |
|---|---|---|---|
| — | GK | KEN | Jude Loveday |
| — | GK | RWA | Davy Kamanzi |
| — | GK | KEN | Lawrence Omondi |
| — | DF | KEN | Brighton Ouma |
| — | DF | KEN | Erickson Kivuva |
| — | DF | KEN | Muthoka Maingi |
| — | DF | KEN | Brian Odak |
| — | DF | KEN | Prince Boit |
| — | DF | KEN | Daniel Wambua |
| — | DF | KEN | Steven Otieno |
| — | MF | COD | Christian Lubulu (captain) |
| — | MF | CMR | Germain Amoa |
| — | MF | KEN | Raydon Munane |
| — | MF | KEN | Remy Mozamil |

| No. | Pos. | Nation | Player |
|---|---|---|---|
| — | MF | KEN | Paul Juma |
| — | MF | KEN | Simon Macharia |
| — | MF | KEN | Brian Mzee |
| — | MF | KEN | Jeremy Mwenda |
| — | MF | KEN | Brillian Ochieng |
| — | MF | NGA | Nathaniel Emmanuel |
| — | MF | KEN | Tom Murila |
| — | MF | KEN | Kennedy Mutesa |
| — | FW | KEN | Abdisalan Abdullah |
| — | FW | KEN | Lewis Lumula |
| — | FW | KEN | Edgar Odhiambo |
| — | FW | KEN | Papa Ogutu |
| — | FW | KEN | Julius Masaba |
| — | FW | KEN | Sean Mwondi |

== Current technical staff ==
As of 2015

| Position | Staff |
|---|---|
| Head coach | (Kenya) Arthur Otieno |
| Assistant head coach | (Kenya) Bernard Ndichu |
| Goalkeeper coach | (Kenya) Ken Opiyo |
| Fitness coach | (Kenya) John Zane Midambo |
| Medical director | (Kenya) Fred Onsakia |
| Reserve team coach | (Kenya) Evans Ogutu |
| Academy director | (Democratic Republic of the Congo) Ibrahim Mbikalo |
| Youth team manager | (Kenya) Emmanuel Juma |

== Honours ==
- Anti-Corruption Cup
  - Winners (1): 2009

== Notable former players that played at international level ==
- Alex Karmo – Played for the Liberia national team
- Ayub Masika – Plays for the Kenya national team
- Edwin Lavatsa – Played for the Kenya national team
- Humphrey Mieno – Played for the Kenya national team
- Jesse Were – Plays for the Kenya national team
- John Guidetti – Plays for the Sweden national team
- Sofiane Rersa – Played for the Kenya national team
- Sven Yidah – Played for the Kenya national U-23 team
- Charles Ouma – Played for the Kenya national U-20 team
- Kibet Kilele – Played for the Kenya national U-20 team
- Kenneth Maritim – Played for the Kenya national team
- (Kenya) Brian Yator – Played for the Kenn national U-23 team

== Former coaches ==
- (Democratic Republic of the Congo) Papy Yoga
- (Kenya) Nick Mwendwa
- (Kenya) Mike Amenga
- (Democratic Republic of the Congo) Ibrahim Mbikalo
- (Kenya) Mike Kamure
- (Germany) Oliver Page
- (England) Tim Bryett
- (Kenya) Evans Ogutu
- (Kenya) Arthur Otieno
- (Kenya) Samuel Machio
