= 2014 Ligi Ndogo S.C. season =

Ligi Ndogo
2014 season
- Chairman: (Kenya) Chris Amimo (1 February 2002)
- Head coach: (Germany) Oliver Page (March 2014); See managerial changes
- Ground: Ligi Ndogo Grounds, Nairobi
- National Super League: 6th
- GOtv Shield: 4th round
| Home colours | Away colours | Third colours |

The 2014 season is Ligi Ndogo Sports Club's first year in the Kenyan National Super League and their fourth consecutive season in the second tier of the Kenyan football league system.

The Planets have gone through the lower tiers of the Kenyan football league system and are now one division below the Premier League. The team started in the Nationwide League's Second Division in 2006 before gaining promotion to the First Division in 2007, where they remained until 2013 (the league has since been changed to FKF Division One). During that season, the team finished the season in fourth place, earning promotion to the newly formed National Super League.

== Season overview ==
=== January ===
The team was back on 13 January for pre-season practice, assembling on the grounds for the opening of its annual training camp Monday morning. Last season, the team put together a 12-5-5 record, highlighted by a five match winning streak in November including wins over K.R.A., Mahakama and Bidco United to sprint from sixth to fourth and qualify for Super League football.

The team welcomes back ten starters from last season's side, including the team's leaders in goals (John Njoroge, 12), assists (Samuel Machio, 18), most appearances (Brian Yator, 47) as well as minutes played (Phillip Ugochukwu, 3,060).

Central defender Arthur Weyula was sold to newly promoted Premier League side Top Fry AllStars, while Leonard Ochieng and Edgar Lenox Odhiambo will feature for Provincial League side Kibera All Stars on waiver and loan respectively. Five-year veteran Machio was selected as team captain and will serve in that capacity throughout the 2014 season. Striker Thomas Lugera is back on the roster after going on loan to Coast United during the 2013 season. Right back Mikhail Mwaniki, the longest serving member of the academy, returns to the active roster after sitting out most of the 2013 season due to personal matters.

Ten transfers joined Ligi Ndogo for this season. Among them was Kibera Black Stars centre back Isaac Omari, a replacement for Weyula, two other defenders, three midfielders, two strikers and former Planets keeper, Charles Ouma, who is back after one year at Premier League side Muhoroni Youth.

In keeping with tradition, six players were promoted from the lower Ligi Ndogo teams. Right back Brian Ochieng (23) and goalkeeper Douglas Aswani (20) were promoted from the foundation team, while midfielders Kibet Kilele (17), Kamaru Waiyaki (17) and Remy Sheikh (16) were promoted from the under-17 side that has featured in the Keele International Cup in England over the past five years. A major part of the Planets' title quest this season will depend on the consistency of their back four, a constantly improving unit that conceded only 7 goals in the second half of the season compared to 15 in the first leg.

The team will play its home games at its Ngong Road centre, where it played its last five matches in the 2013 season with a record of 4-1.

=== February ===
The team added one more player from the youth system, Christian Lubulu (19), and dropped two more (Wycliffe Njenga and Eric Kibiru) before the final team hand-over deadline. 2012 top scorer Vincent Okoth returned to the roster and was joined by Clifford Ouma and Obadiah Ndege, who is on loan from Posta Rangers. Brillian Ochieng also returned to the squad, while goalkeeper Tom Muthomi was released to Nairobi Stima.

Ligi Ndogo had its first friendly game against the Academy side and lost 2-1 before bouncing back to beat Iron Strikers 4-0. In a subsequent rematch, it beat the Academy team 1-0. The team played three more pre-season friendlies in anticipation of the start of the National Super League. However, the kick-off was postponed by a week due to a series of new rules that teams had to comply with.

=== March ===
On 15 March, the Planets won their first match of the 2014 National Super League and went top of the league in the first week of action. Brian Yator's hat trick pushed his goal tally to eight in seven matches. On 23 March the Planets went down 3-0 to Posta Rangers, their first league defeat by two goals or more since 14 October 2012 (losing 2-0 to Bandari). Goalkeeper Charles Ouma aggravated a knee injury and was ruled out for six weeks.

The Planets held Kariobangi Sharks to a 1-1 draw with a late penalty on 29 March for 4 points in their slowest start after three matches (9 points in 2011 and 7 points in 2012). The match was German tactician Oliver Page's first since taking over the senior team. He had previously joined the Academy as a technical advisor, and he now becomes the Sports Director.

== Players ==
=== Current squad ===
As of 28 February 2014.

| # | Nat. | Name | Pos. | Date of birth (age) | Signed from |
Goalkeepers
| 18 | (Kenya) | Charles Ouma | GK | 27 July 1991 (age 35) | Muhoroni Youth (2014) |
| 22 | (Kenya) | Samuel Njau | GK | 16 June 1994 (age 32) | Limuru Olympic (2011) |
| - | (Kenya) | Douglas Aswani | GK | 1 February 1994 (age 32) | Academy |
Defenders
| 3 | (Kenya) | Mikhail Mwaniki | RB | 20 April 1990 (age 36) | Academy |
| 4 | (Kenya) | Evans Njuku | RB | 10 October 1993 (age 32) | Academy |
| 5 | (Nigeria) | Philip Ugochukwu | CB | 1 October 1993 (age 32) | K.R.A. (2013) |
| 13 | (Kenya) | Benjamin Kipruto | RB/CB | 17 January 1987 (age 39) | Academy |
| 15 | (Kenya) | Isaac Omari | CB | 10 July 1993 (age 33) | Kibera Black Stars (2014) |
| – | (Kenya) | James Dundi | CB | 23 April 1994 (age 32) | Kibera Black Stars (2014) |
| – | (Kenya) | Brian Ochieng | RB | 1 January 1991 (age 35) | Academy |
| – | (Kenya) | Nashon Omondi | LB | 11 March 1990 (age 36) | Impala (2013) |
| – | (Kenya) | Brian Lutah | LB | 20 September 1992 (age 34) | Academy |
Midfielders
| 2 | (Kenya) | Sven Yida | AM | 18 December 1998 (age 27) | Academy |
| 19 | (Kenya) | Jacob Omutanyi | AM | 28 December 1995 (age 30) | Tena |
| 6 | (Kenya) | Douglas Simiyu | LM | 13 January 1991 (age 35) | Namachanja High School (2011) |
| 8 | (Kenya) | Alex Luganji | DM | 28 April 1994 (age 32) | Iron Strikers |
| 10 | (Kenya) | Samuel Machio (captain) | CM | 3 October 1985 (age 40) | Academy |
| 14 | (Kenya) | Collins Odawa | CM | 23 May 1994 (age 32) | Ambira High School (2011) |
| 16 | (Democratic Republic of the Congo) | Christian Lubulu | AM | 27 January 1995 (age 31) | Academy |
| 17 | (Kenya) | Brian Yator | LM/RM | 27 July 1997 (age 29) | Academy |
| – | (Kenya) | Kibet Kilele | CM | 15 December 1996 (age 29) | Academy |
| – | (Kenya) | Remy Sheikh | CM | 20 March 1998 (age 28) | Ligi Ndogo S.C. |
| – | (Kenya) | Kamaru Waiyaki | AM | 25 September 1996 (age 29) | Academy |
| – | (Kenya) | Nassor Yusuf | AM | 1 March 1989 (age 37) | Kibera Celtic (2014) |
| – | (Kenya) | Emmanuel Alim | DM | 20 January 1994 (age 32) | Rongai (2014) |
| – | (Kenya) | Brillian Ochieng | LM | 11 February 1991 (age 35) | Academy |
Forwards
| 7 | (Kenya) | John Njoroge | CF | 6 October 1989 (age 36) | Academy |
| 9 | (Kenya) | Obadiah Ndege | ST | 26 October 1991 (age 34) | Posta Rangers (2013) |
| 11 | (Kenya) | Thomas Lugera | ST | 20 October 1994 (age 31) | Academy |
| 12 | (Kenya) | Clifford Ouma | ST | 22 August 1991 (age 35) | Academy |
| – | (Kenya) | Jackson Oketch | ST/RW | 20 June 1995 (age 31) | Nakumatt (2013) |
| – | (Kenya) | Vincent Okoth | ST | 2 July 1987 (age 39) | Free agent |

=== Transfers ===
==== From the youth system ====
| N | Pos. | Nat. | Name | Age | Notes |
|---|---|---|---|---|---|
| 7 | MF | (Kenya) | Kibet Kilele | 17 | |
| 9 | MF | (Kenya) | Remy Sheikh | 16 | |
| 11 | MF | (Kenya) | Kamaru Waiyaki | 17 | |
| 17 | MF | (Democratic Republic of the Congo) | Christian Lubulu | 19 | |
| 18 | GK | (Kenya) | Douglas Aswani | 20 | |
| 19 | DF | (Kenya) | Brian Ochieng | 23 | |

==== Transfers in ====
Transfers In
| Player | Position | Date | Price | From | Age |
|---|---|---|---|---|---|
| (Kenya) Isaac Omari | Defender | January 13 | Free | Kibera Celtic | 25 |
| (Kenya) Charles Ouma | Goalkeeper | January 13 | Free | Muhoroni Youth | 21 |
| (Kenya) James Dundi | Defender | January 30 | Free | Kibera Celtic | 20 |
| (Kenya) Nassor Yussuf | Midfielder | January 30 | Free | Kibera Celtic | 25 |
| (Kenya) Emmanuel Alim | Midfielder | January 30 | Free | Rongai | 20 |
| (Kenya) Vincent Okoth | Striker | January 30 | Free | Vapor | 26 |
| (Kenya) Obadiah Ndege | Striker | February 27 | Loan | Posta Rangers | 22 |

==== Transfers out ====
Transfers out
| Player | Position | Date | Reason | To | Age |
|---|---|---|---|---|---|
| (Kenya) Arthur Weyula | Defender | January 6 | Free | Top Fry AllStars | 30 |
| (Kenya) Leonard Ochieng | Striker | January 10 | Free | Kibera Black Stars | 22 |
| (Kenya) Edgar Odhiambo | Striker | January 17 | Free | Kibera Black Stars | 18 |

== Club ==
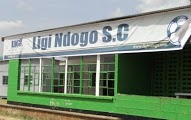
The Ligi Ndogo club house pictured in 2011.

=== Coaching staff ===
| Position | Staff |
|---|---|
| Head coach | (Germany) Oliver Page |
| Assistant head coach | (Kenya) Bernard Ndichu |
| Goalkeeper coach | (Kenya) Ken Opiyo |
| Fitness coach | (Kenya) John Zane Midambo |
| Medical director | (Kenya) Fred Onsakia |
| Reserve team coach | (Kenya) Evans Ogutu |
| Academy director | (Democratic Republic of the Congo) Ibrahim Mbikalo |
| Youth team manager | (Kenya) Mikhail Mwaniki |
| Match analyst | (Kenya) Chris Amimo |
| Team administrator | (Kenya) Calvin Odhiambo |

Source: Ligi Ndogo

==== Managerial changes ====
| Outgoing head coach | Manner of departure | Date of vacancy | Position in table | Incoming head coach | Date of appointment |
|---|---|---|---|---|---|
| (Kenya) Bernard Ndichu (caretaker) | Demoted | 9 November 2013 | 4th | (Germany) Oliver Page | March 2014 |

=== Kit ===
Supplier: Tsunami Sportswear
Sponsor(s): Ligi Ndogo, Sandlanders Football

| Home | Away | Third |

== Competitions ==
Legend

Win Draw Loss

=== Overall ===
| Competition | Started round | Current position / round | Final position / round | First match | Last match |
|---|---|---|---|---|---|
| National Super League | – | 6th | TBD | 15 March 2014 | TBA |
| GOtv Shield | 2nd round | – | 4th round | 31 May 2014 | 7 September 2014 |

Updated to match played 7 September 2014
Source: Competitions

=== Pre-season ===
| 3 February 2014 Exhibition | Ligi Ndogo | 1–2 | Ligi Ndogo Jr. | Ligi Ndogo Grounds, Nairobi |
| | Lugera 16' | | Bakatubia 23'; Mwaniki 35' (o.g.) | Referee: Bartholomew Nyariki |

| 10 February 2014 Exhibition | Ligi Ndogo | 4–0 | Iron Strikers | Harlequins Grounds, Nairobi |
| | Yida 37'; Yator 35', 47', 55' | | | Referee: Bartholomew Nyariki |

| 10 February 2014 Exhibition | Ligi Ndogo Jr. | 0–1 | Ligi Ndogo | Harlequins Grounds, Nairobi |
| | | | Njenga 78' (yellow card) 57' | Referee: Bartholomew Nyariki |

| 19 February 2014 Exhibition | Vapor | 1–5 | Ligi Ndogo | Vapor Grounds, Ngong |
| | Ouma 53' (o.g.) | | Njoroge 8', 19'; Yator 30'; Kibichu 77'; Machio 79'; Kipruto (yellow card) 27' | Referee: Eric Sadera |

| 21 February 2014 Exhibition | Ligi Ndogo | 4–0 | Hamza Combined | City Stadium, Nairobi |
| | Njoroge 8', 58'; Yida (yellow card) 19'; Odawa (yellow card) 27'; Oketch 79'; Lugera 104' | | | Referee: Amin Agik |

| 26 February 2014 Exhibition | University of Nairobi | 1–2 | Ligi Ndogo | University Grounds, Nairobi |
| | | | Yator 8'; Njoroge 12'; Ugochukwu (yellow card) 90' | Referee: Amin Agik |

| 5 March 2014 Exhibition | Ligi Ndogo | 2–1 | Kibera Black Stars | City Stadium, Nairobi |
| | Yidah 15'; Kimani 49' (o.g.); Odawa (yellow card) 69' | | Njoroge 31' | Referee: Badir Yasin |

| 6 March 2014 Exhibition | Kitengela Shooters | 2–2 | Ligi Ndogo | Prisons Ground, Kitengela |
| | | | Mwaniki (yellow card) 10'; Hassan 60'; Lugera 87' | Referee: Jackson Molly |

=== National Super League ===
==== League table ====
| Pos | Team | Pld | W | D | L | GF | GA | GD | Pts |
|---|---|---|---|---|---|---|---|---|---|
| 4 | Oserian | 22 | 8 | 7 | 7 | 24 | 20 | +4 | 31 |
| 5 | Nairobi Stima | 22 | 8 | 7 | 7 | 20 | 18 | +2 | 31 |
| 6 | Ligi Ndogo | 22 | 6 | 10 | 6 | 21 | 21 | 0 | 28 |
| 7 | Bidco United | 22 | 6 | 9 | 7 | 17 | 18 | −1 | 27 |
| 8 | Kariobangi Sharks | 22 | 5 | 9 | 8 | 19 | 25 | −6 | 24 |

Updated to match(es) played on 2 November 2014. Source: Kenyan National Super League
Rules for classification: 1) points; 2) goal difference; 3) number of goals scored.

==== Results summary ====
| Overall | | | | | | | | Home | | | | | | Away | | | | | |
| Pld | W | D | L | GF | GA | GD | Pts | W | D | L | GF | GA | GD | W | D | L | GF | GA | GD |
|---|---|---|---|---|---|---|---|---|---|---|---|---|---|---|---|---|---|---|---|
| 15 | 3 | 8 | 4 | 14 | 15 | −1 | 17 | 2 | 4 | 1 | 11 | 9 | +2 | 1 | 4 | 3 | 3 | 6 | −3 |

Last updated: 24 August 2014.
Source: National Super League (Zone A)

==== Results by round ====
| Round | 1 | 2 | 3 | 4 | 5 | 6 | 7 | 8 | 9 | 10 | 11 | 12 | 13 | 14 | 15 | 16 | 17 | 18 | 19 | 20 | 21 | 22 |
|---|---|---|---|---|---|---|---|---|---|---|---|---|---|---|---|---|---|---|---|---|---|---|
| Ground | H | A | H | A | A | H | A | H | A | H | A | A | H | H | A | | | | | | | |
| Result | W | L | D | W | D | L | D | D | D | W | L | D | | | | | | | | | | |
| Position | 1 | 8 | 9 | 5 | 5 | 7 | 8 | 8 | 7 | 5 | 5 | 5 | | | | | | | | | | |

Updated to match(es) played on 24 August 2014. Source: Matches
A = Away; H = Home; W = Win; D = Draw; L = Loss

==== Matches ====
| 15 March 2014 1 | Ligi Ndogo | 4–3 | FC Talanta | City Stadium, Nairobi |
| 3:12 UTC+3 | Omari 8'; Kipruto (yellow card) 60'; Njoroge (yellow card) 63'; Yator 30', 71', 87' (pen.) | Report | Zakaria 5'; Karanja (yellow card) 12'; Okaka (yellow card) 42'; Otieno 18' (pen.), 46' | Attendance: 120; Referee: Damaris Kimani |

| 23 March 2014 2 | Posta Rangers | 3–0 | Ligi Ndogo | City Stadium, Nairobi |
| 3:00 UTC+3 | Ochieng 47'; Kisuya 53'; Olwith 77' | Report | | Attendance: 300; Referee: Badir Yassin |

| 29 March 2014 3 | Ligi Ndogo | 1–1 | Kariobangi Sharks | City Stadium, Nairobi |
| 11:33 UTC+3 | Njoroge 90' (pen.); Yida (yellow card) 41'; Ouma (yellow card) 66' | Report | Nameka 42'; Muringu (yellow card) 21'; Juma (yellow card) 88' | Attendance: 180; Referee: Frank Obare |

| 5 April 2014 4 | Mahakama | 0–2 | Ligi Ndogo | City Stadium, Nairobi |
| 15:00 UTC+3 | | Report | Yator 14'; Okoth 69'; Simiyu (yellow card) 45' (red card) 89'; Hassan (yellow card) 59'; Ugochukwu (yellow card) 70' | Referee: James Omondi |

| 13 April 2014 5 | Modern Coast Rangers | 1–1 | Ligi Ndogo | Refinery Grounds, Mombasa |
| 15:05 UTC+3 | Mwichande 57'; Matano (yellow card) 28' | Report | Okoth 49'; Okoth (yellow card) 82'; Lugera (yellow card) 85' | Attendance: 300; Referee: Docta Hosea Omondi |

| 19 April 2014 6 | Ligi Ndogo | 0–3 | Nakumatt | City Stadium, Nairobi |
| 15:00 UTC+3 | Machio (yellow card) 29'; Luganji (yellow card) 77' | Report | Ochieng 28'; Nzuki 52'; Onyango 28' | Referee: John Omoke |

| 4 May 2014 7 | Oserian | 0–0 | Ligi Ndogo | Naivasha Stadium, Naivasha |
| 15:00 UTC+3 | | Report |

| 11 May 2014 8 | Ligi Ndogo | 0–0 | Nairobi Stima | City Stadium, Nairobi |
| 15:00 UTC+3 | | Report |

| 17 May 2014 9 | Bidco United | 0–0 | Ligi Ndogo | Del Monte Grounds, Thika |
| 15:00 UTC+3 | | Report |

| 24 May 2014 10 | Ligi Ndogo | 5–1 | Administration Police | City Stadium, Nairobi |
| 15:00 UTC+3 | Ugochukwu 5'; Njuku 30'; Omari 60'; Yida 64'; Yussuf 67' | Report | Alemba 15' |

| 8 June 2014 11 | MOYAS | 1–0 | Ligi Ndogo | Hope Centre, Nairobi |
| 15:00 UTC+3 | Libesi 23' | Report |

| 2 August 2014 12 | Nairobi Stima | 0–0 | Ligi Ndogo | Stima Club, Nairobi |
| 15:00 UTC+3 | | Report |

| 10 August 2014 13 | Ligi Ndogo | 0–0 | Bidco United |
| 15:00 UTC+3 | | Report |

| 16 August 2014 14 | Ligi Ndogo | 1–1 | Oserian |
| 15:00 UTC+3 | | Report |

| 24 August 2014 15 | Nakumatt | 1–0 | Ligi Ndogo | Sameer Grounds |
| 15:00 UTC+3 | Thairu 88' | Report |

=== GOtv Shield ===
| 31 May 2014 Second round | Ligi Ndogo | 1 – 1 (5 – 4 p) | Kenya Commercial Bank | Hope Centre, Nairobi |
| 15:00 UTC+3 | Yida 51' | Report | Warambo 70' |
| | Penalties |
| | Ugochukwu (penalty scored); Omari (penalty scored); Yator (penalty scored); Njuku (penalty missed); Dundi (penalty scored); Ouma (penalty missed); Lubulu (penalty scored) | | (penalty scored) Kiongera; (penalty scored) Odhiambo; (penalty scored) Oyando; (penalty scored) Chaka; (penalty missed) Onyango; (penalty missed) Omondi; (penalty missed) Warambo |

| 20 July 2014 Third round | Ligi Ndogo | 3 – 0 | Zoo Kericho | Ruaraka Stadium, Nairobi |
| 11:00 UTC+3 | Yida 18'; Sindani 26' (o.g.); Rersa (yellow card) 32'; Simiyu 90' | Report | Ayieko (yellow card) 45'; Kipkirui (yellow card) 52'; Sindani (yellow card) 70' (yellow-red card) 90' |

| 7 September 2014 Fourth round | A.F.C. Leopards | 2 – 0 | Ligi Ndogo | City Stadium, Nairobi |
| 15:00 UTC+3 | Keli (red card) 44'; Mudde 55', 70' | Report |

=== Mid-season ===
This is a list of friendlies played during the course of the season.

| 24 April 2014 Exhibition | Vapor | 0–4 | Ligi Ndogo | Vapor Grounds, Ngong |
| | | | Yusuf 37' (pen.); Yida 46' (pen.); Okoth 67'; Ndege 82' (yellow card) 63' | Attendance: 70^{[*]} Referee: Isaac Memusi |

- Attendance figures are estimates to the nearest 10.

== Statistics ==
=== Squad statistics ===
As of 21 April 2014.

| No. | Name | Pos. | Pre. | | | League | | | Mid. | | | Total | | | Discipline | |
| No. | Name | Pos. | Apps | Goals | Assists | Apps | Goals | Assists | Apps | Goals | Assists | Apps | Goals | Assists | Yellow card | Red card |
|---|---|---|---|---|---|---|---|---|---|---|---|---|---|---|---|---|
| 2 | (Kenya) Sven Yida | AM | 7 | 2 | 3 | 5 | 0 | 1 | 1 | 1 | 0 | 0 | 0 | 0 | 2 | 0 |
| 17 | (Kenya) Brian Yator | AM | 6 | 5 | 2 | 5 | 4 | 1 | 0 | 0 | 0 | 0 | 0 | 0 | 0 | 0 |
| 11 | (Kenya) Thomas Lugera | ST | 6 | 3 | 1 | 2 | 0 | 0 | 1 | 0 | 0 | 0 | 0 | 0 | 1 | 0 |
| 11 | (Kenya) Jacob Omutanyi | AM | 8 | 3 | 1 | 2 | 0 | 0 | 1 | 0 | 0 | 0 | 0 | 0 | 1 | 0 |
| – | (Kenya) Wycliffe Njenga | AM | 3 | 1 | 0 | 0 | 0 | 0 | 0 | 0 | 0 | 0 | 0 | 0 | 1 | 0 |
| – | (Kenya) Jackson Oketch | ST | 7 | 1 | 4 | 2 | 0 | 0 | 0 | 0 | 0 | 0 | 0 | 0 | 0 | 0 |
| 7 | (Kenya) John Njoroge | ST | 6 | 6 | 0 | 5 | 1 | 2 | 1 | 0 | 0 | 0 | 0 | 0 | 1 | 0 |
| – | (Kenya) Eric Kibiru | AM | 4 | 1 | 0 | 0 | 0 | 0 | 0 | 0 | 0 | 0 | 0 | 0 | 0 | 0 |
| 10 | (Kenya) Samuel Machio | CM | 5 | 1 | 2 | 6 | 0 | 1 | 1 | 0 | 0 | 0 | 0 | 0 | 1 | 0 |
| 4 | (Kenya) Evans Njuku | RB | 5 | 0 | 3 | 6 | 0 | 0 | 1 | 0 | 0 | 0 | 0 | 0 | 0 | 0 |
| 13 | (Kenya) Ken Kipruto | LB | 5 | 0 | 0 | 2 | 0 | 0 | 1 | 0 | 0 | 0 | 0 | 0 | 2 | 0 |
| 12 | (Kenya) Clifford Ouma | ST | 4 | 0 | 3 | 4 | 0 | 1 | 1 | 0 | 1 | 0 | 0 | 0 | 1 | 0 |
| 8 | (Kenya) Nassor Yusuf | AM | 5 | 1 | 1 | 1 | 0 | 0 | 1 | 1 | 0 | 0 | 0 | 0 | 1 | 0 |
| 8 | (Kenya) Alex Luganji | AM | 3 | 0 | 1 | 1 | 0 | 0 | 1 | 0 | 1 | 0 | 0 | 0 | 0 | 0 |
| 14 | (Kenya) Collins Odawa | AM | 6 | 0 | 1 | 6 | 0 | 0 | 1 | 0 | 0 | 0 | 0 | 0 | 3 | 0 |
| 5 | (Nigeria) Philip Ugochukwu | CB | 6 | 0 | 0 | 5 | 0 | 0 | 1 | 0 | 0 | 0 | 0 | 0 | 2 | 0 |
| 3 | (Kenya) Mikhail Mwaniki | RB | 5 | 0 | 0 | 0 | 0 | 0 | 1 | 0 | 0 | 0 | 0 | 0 | 1 | 0 |
| 9 | (Kenya) Obadiah Ndege | ST | 0 | 0 | 0 | 5 | 0 | 1 | 1 | 1 | 1 | 0 | 0 | 0 | 1 | 0 |
| 6 | (Kenya) Douglas Simiyu | LB | 6 | 0 | 0 | 2 | 0 | 0 | 1 | 0 | 0 | 0 | 0 | 0 | 1 | 1 |
| 15 | (Kenya) Isaac Omari | LB | 7 | 0 | 0 | 6 | 1 | 0 | 0 | 0 | 0 | 0 | 0 | 0 | 0 | 0 |
| 16 | (Democratic Republic of the Congo) Christian Lubulu | CM | 7 | 0 | 0 | 3 | 0 | 0 | 1 | 0 | 0 | 0 | 0 | 0 | 0 | 0 |
| 12 | (Kenya) Vincent Okoth | ST | 0 | 0 | 0 | 3 | 2 | 0 | 1 | 1 | 1 | 0 | 0 | 0 | 1 | 0 |

* Repeated numbers are for jerseys shared in different matches.

==== Goalkeepers ====
| No. | Name | GP | Goals conceded | | | | TGA | AGA |
| No. | Name | GP | Pre. | League | Cup^{[a]} | Mid. | TGA | AGA |
|---|---|---|---|---|---|---|---|---|
| 22 | (Kenya) Samuel Njau | 7 | 1 | 6 | 0 | 0 | 7 | 1.00 |
| 18 | (Kenya) Charles Ouma | 6 | 4 | 5 | 0 | 0 | 9 | 1.50 |
| – | (Kenya) Tom Muthomi^{[b]} | 4 | 0 | 0 | 0 | 0 | 0 | 0.00 |
| – | (Kenya) Douglas Aswani | 1 | 1 | 0 | 0 | 0 | 1 | 1.00 |
| Totals | | 19 | 6 | 11 | 0 | 0 | 17 | 0.89 |

a. Includes the GOtv Shield, Jamhuri Day Cup and Madaraka Day Cup.
b. Tom Muthomi was released after four exhibition matches.

=== Season statistics ===
==== Total appearances and goals ====
| No. | Nat. | Player | Pre. | | | | | League | | | | | Mid. | | | | | Cup^{[a]} | | | | | Totals | | | | |
| No. | Nat. | Player | TA | ST | SB | Gs | Ms | TA | ST | SB | Gs | Ms | TA | ST | SB | Gs | Ms | TA | ST | SB | Gs | Ms | TA | ST | SB | Gs | Ms |
Goalkeepers
| 18 | (Kenya) | Charles Ouma | 5 | 4 | 1 | 0 | | 2 | 2 | 0 | 0 | | 0 | 0 | 0 | 0 | | 0 | 0 | 0 | 0 | | 7 | 6 | 1 | 0 | 482 |
| 22 | (Kenya) | Samuel Njau | 3 | 1 | 2 | 0 | | 5 | 4 | 1 | 0 | | 1 | 1 | 0 | 0 | | 0 | 0 | 0 | 0 | | 8 | 5 | 3 | 0 | 784 |
| – | (Kenya) | Douglas Aswani | 1 | 1 | 0 | 0 | | 0 | 0 | 0 | 0 | | 0 | 0 | 0 | 0 | | 0 | 0 | 0 | 0 | | 1 | 1 | 0 | 0 | 94 |
| – | (Kenya) | Tom Muthomi | 2 | 1 | 1 | 0 | | 0 | 0 | 0 | 0 | | 0 | 0 | 0 | 0 | | 0 | 0 | 0 | 0 | | 2 | 1 | 1 | 0 | 140 |
Defenders
| 3 | (Kenya) | Mikhail Mwaniki | 5 | 2 | 3 | 0 | | 0 | 0 | 0 | 0 | | 1 | 1 | 0 | 0 | | 0 | 0 | 0 | 0 | | 6 | 3 | 4 | 0 | 395 |
| 4 | (Kenya) | Evans Njuku | 4 | 4 | 0 | 0 | | 6 | 6 | 0 | 0 | | 1 | 0 | 1 | 0 | | 0 | 0 | 0 | 0 | | 11 | 10 | 1 | 0 | 899 |
| 5 | (Nigeria) | Philip Ugochukwu | 6 | 4 | 2 | 0 | | 5 | 5 | 0 | 0 | | 1 | 1 | 0 | 0 | | 0 | 0 | 0 | 0 | | 12 | 10 | 2 | 0 | 1051 |
| 13 | (Kenya) | Benjamin Kipruto | 6 | 3 | 3 | 0 | | 1 | 1 | 0 | 0 | | 1 | 1 | 0 | 0 | | 0 | 0 | 0 | 0 | | 8 | 5 | 3 | 0 | 488 |
| 15 | (Kenya) | Isaac Omari | 6 | 4 | 2 | 0 | | 6 | 6 | 0 | 1 | | 0 | 0 | 0 | 0 | | 0 | 0 | 0 | 0 | | 12 | 10 | 2 | 1 | 947 |
| – | (Kenya) | James Dundi | 5 | 2 | 3 | 0 | | 0 | 0 | 0 | 0 | | 0 | 0 | 0 | 0 | | 0 | 0 | 0 | 0 | | 5 | 2 | 3 | 0 | 298 |
| – | (Kenya) | Brian Lutah | 5 | 2 | 3 | 0 | | 0 | 0 | 0 | 0 | | 0 | 0 | 0 | 0 | | 0 | 0 | 0 | 0 | | 5 | 2 | 3 | 0 | 285 |
| – | (Kenya) | Brian Ochieng | 5 | 1 | 4 | 0 | | 0 | 0 | 0 | 0 | | 0 | 0 | 0 | 0 | | 0 | 0 | 0 | 0 | | 5 | 1 | 4 | 0 | 315 |
| – | (Kenya) | Nashon Omondi | 5 | 3 | 2 | 0 | | 4 | 4 | 0 | 0 | | 1 | 0 | 1 | 0 | | 0 | 0 | 0 | 0 | | 10 | 7 | 3 | 0 | 703 |
Midfielders
| 2 | (Kenya) | Sven Yidah | 7 | 6 | 0 | 2 | | 5 | 4 | 0 | 0 | | 1 | 0 | 1 | 1 | | 0 | 0 | 0 | 0 | | 11 | 10 | 1 | 3 | 945 |
| 6 | (Kenya) | Douglas Simiyu | 6 | 1 | 5 | 0 | | 2 | 1 | 1 | 0 | | 1 | 0 | 1 | 0 | | 0 | 0 | 0 | 0 | | 9 | 2 | 7 | 0 | 541 |
| 8 | (Kenya) | Alex Luganji | 5 | 2 | 3 | 0 | | 1 | 0 | 1 | 0 | | 1 | 0 | 1 | 0 | | 0 | 0 | 0 | 0 | | 7 | 2 | 5 | 0 | 404 |
| 10 | (Kenya) | Samuel Machio (captain) | 6 | 4 | 2 | 1 | | 5 | 5 | 0 | 0 | | 1 | 0 | 1 | 0 | | 0 | 0 | 0 | 0 | | 12 | 9 | 3 | 1 | 945 |
| 14 | (Kenya) | Collins Odawa | 6 | 6 | 0 | 0 | | 7 | 6 | 1 | 0 | | 1 | 1 | 0 | 0 | | 0 | 0 | 0 | 0 | | 14 | 13 | 1 | 0 | 795 |
| 16 | (Democratic Republic of the Congo) | Christian Lubulu | 4 | 1 | 3 | 0 | | 2 | 0 | 2 | 0 | | 1 | 1 | 0 | 0 | | 0 | 0 | 0 | 0 | | 7 | 2 | 5 | 0 | 324 |
| 17 | (Kenya) | Brian Yator | 6 | 6 | 0 | 5 | | 4 | 3 | 1 | 4 | | 0 | 0 | 0 | 0 | | 0 | 0 | 0 | 0 | | 10 | 9 | 1 | 9 | 853 |
| – | (Kenya) | Emmanuel Alim | 6 | 2 | 4 | 0 | 285 | 0 | 0 | 0 | 0 | | 0 | 0 | 0 | 0 | | 0 | 0 | 0 | 0 | | 6 | 2 | 4 | 0 | 285 |
| – | (Kenya) | Eric Kibiru | 6 | 2 | 4 | 1 | 298 | 0 | 0 | 0 | 0 | | 0 | 0 | 0 | 0 | | 0 | 0 | 0 | 0 | | 6 | 2 | 4 | 1 | 298 |
| – | (Kenya) | Wycliffe Njenga | 4 | 1 | 3 | 0 | 303 | 0 | 0 | 0 | 0 | | 0 | 0 | 0 | 0 | | 0 | 0 | 0 | 0 | | 4 | 1 | 3 | 0 | 303 |
| – | (Kenya) | Brillian Ochieng | 2 | 0 | 2 | 0 | | 2 | 1 | 1 | 0 | | 1 | 0 | 1 | 0 | | 0 | 0 | 0 | 0 | | 5 | 1 | 4 | 0 | 112 |
| – | (Kenya) | Nassor Yusuf | 7 | 2 | 5 | 1 | | 1 | 0 | 1 | 0 | | 1 | 1 | 0 | 1 | | 0 | 0 | 0 | 0 | | 9 | 3 | 6 | 2 | 496 |
Forwards
| 7 | (Kenya) | John Njoroge | 5 | 5 | 0 | 6 | | 6 | 6 | 0 | 1 | | 1 | 0 | 1 | 0 | | 0 | 0 | 0 | 0 | | 12 | 11 | 1 | 7 | 930 |
| 9 | (Kenya) | Obadiah Ndege | 1 | 1 | 0 | 0 | | 3 | 3 | 0 | 0 | | 1 | 0 | 1 | 1 | | 0 | 0 | 0 | 0 | | 5 | 4 | 1 | 1 | 570 |
| 11 | (Kenya) | Thomas Lugera | 6 | 2 | 4 | 3 | | 2 | 1 | 1 | 0 | | 1 | 1 | 0 | 0 | | 0 | 0 | 0 | 0 | | 9 | 4 | 5 | 3 | 401 |
| 12 | (Kenya) | Clifford Ouma | 5 | 0 | 5 | 0 | | 3 | 0 | 3 | 0 | | 1 | 1 | 0 | 0 | | 0 | 0 | 0 | 0 | | 9 | 1 | 8 | 0 | 379 |
| – | (Kenya) | Jackson Oketch | 7 | 6 | 1 | 1 | | 2 | 1 | 1 | 0 | | 0 | 0 | 0 | 0 | | 0 | 0 | 0 | 0 | | 9 | 7 | 2 | 1 | 581 |
| – | (Kenya) | Vincent Okoth | 0 | 0 | 0 | 0 | | 3 | 3 | 0 | 2 | | 1 | 0 | 1 | 1 | | 0 | 0 | 0 | 0 | | 4 | 3 | 1 | 3 | 326 |

Last updated: 22 April 2014

a. Includes the GOtv Shield, Jamhuri Day Cup and Madaraka Day Cup.

==== Totals and averages ====
As of 4 May 2014.

| | Total | Home | Away |
|---|---|---|---|
| Games played | 16 | 6 | 10 |
| Games won | 9 | 3 | 6 |
| Games drawn | 4 | 1 | 3 |
| Games lost | 3 | 2 | 1 |
| Clean sheets | 6 | 2 | 4 |
| Goals scored | 33 | 16 | 17 |
| Goals conceded | 19 | 10 | 9 |
| Goal difference | +14 | +9 | +8 |
| Average goals scored | 2.06 | 2.67 | 1.70 |
| Average goals conceded | 1.19 | 1.17 | 1.30 |
| Yellow cards (yellow card) | 19 | 9 | 10 |
| Red cards (red card) | 1 | 0 | 1 |
| League points | 8 | 4 | 4 |
| Winning rate | 56.25% | 50% | 60% |

==== Records ====
As of 22 April 2014.

| Record | Total | | Home | | Away | |
| Record | Score | Opponent(s) | Score | Opponent(s) | Score | Opponent(s) |
|---|---|---|---|---|---|---|
Biggest win
| Overall | 5–1 | Vapor | 4–0 | Hamza Combined | 5–1 | Vapor |
| Overall | 5–1 | Vapor | 4–0 | Iron Strikers | 5–1 | Vapor |
| League | 4–3 | FC Talanta | 4–3 | FC Talanta | 2–0 | Mahakama |
| Cup^{[1]} | TBD | To be determined | TBD | To be determined | TBD | To be determined |
| Friendlies | 5–1 | Vapor | 4–0 | Hamza Combined | 5–1 | Vapor |
| Friendlies | 5–1 | Vapor | 4–0 | Iron Strikers | 5–1 | Vapor |
Biggest loss
| Overall | 3–0 | Posta Rangers | 3–0 | Posta Rangers) | 3–0 | Nakumatt |
| Overall | 3–0 | Nakumatt | 3–0 | Posta Rangers) | 3–0 | Nakumatt |
| League | 3–0 | Posta Rangers | 3–0 | Posta Rangers) | 3–0 | Nakumatt |
| League | 3–0 | Nakumatt | 3–0 | Posta Rangers) | 3–0 | Nakumatt |
| Cup^{[1]} | TBD | To be determined | TBD | To be determined | TBD | To be determined |
| Friendlies | 2–1 | Ligi Ndogo Jr. | 2–1 | Ligi Ndogo Jr. | n/a | Not available |

| Record | Overall | | Home | | Away | |
| Record | No. | Player(s) | No. | Player(s) | No. | Player(s) |
|---|---|---|---|---|---|---|
| Appearances | 13 | 2 players | 8 | Sven Yida | 6 | Philip Ugochukwu (6) |
| Minutes played | 1,051 | Phillip Ugochukwu | 310 | Philip Ugochukwu | 741 | Philip Ugochukwu |
| Goals scored | 9 | Brian Yator | 6 | Brian Yator | 3 | Brian Yator |
| Goals scored | 9 | Brian Yator | 6 | Brian Yator | 3 | John Njoroge |
| Assists given | 4 | Jackson Oketch | 2 | Clifford Ouma | 3 | Jackson Oketch |
| Yellow cards (yellow card) | 2 | Collins Odawa | 2 | Collins Odawa | 1 | Douglas Simiyu |
| Red cards (red card) | 1 | Douglas Simiyu | TBD | To be determined | 1 | Douglas Simiyu |

1 Includes the GOtv Shield, Jamhuri Day Cup and Madaraka Day Cup.
