= 2023–24 Kariobangi Sharks FC season =

Kenyan football club season

Kariobangi Sharks
2023-24 KPL season
- Owner: Nick Mwendwa
- Chairman: Robert Maoga
- Head coach: William Muluya
- Stadium: Utalii grounds
- Kenyan Premier League: 7th
- 2023-24 Betway Cup: 4th
- Top goalscorer: League: John Mark Makwatta, (16); All: John Mark Makwatta, (19)
- Biggest win: 5-1 vs Posta Rangers (A), 10 Mar 2024, 2023-24 KPL
- Biggest defeat: 3-1 vs Nairobi City Stars (A), 25 Nov 2023, 2023-24 KPL

The 2023-24 season was Kariobangi Sharks eighth straight in the Kenyan Premier League following their promotion from the National Super League at the end of the year 2016.

Sharks improved from the 41 points and eleventh position last season to end up seventh at the end of the 2023–24 season with 48 points after a marked improvement in the second leg which was largely attributed to mid season signing John Mark Makwatta. He scored an incredible 16 league goals in 17 second leg games to finish as the second top scorer in the league while lifting Sharks from the relegation trap door.Part of Makwatta's highlight was scoring three braces against KCB, Tusker and Shabana, and a quartet in a 5-2 demolition of Sofapaka FC on 11 May 2014 at the Dandora Stadium to join a rare and exclusive club. He added three more goals in Cup games - all winners against Nyamira Super Eagles, Ulinzi Stars, and SS Assad in the initial rounds to cap his six months at the club as the top scorer with 19 goals.

With Makwata on board, Sharks first leg struggles where they were placed 13th with 18 points turned around in the second leg as the team improved to scoop 30 more points to finish seventh. This included an 11-match unbeaten streak between matchdays 21 on 10 February to matchday 32 on 14 June 2024. The heaviest registered win of the season achieved in that period was a 5-1 win over the league's leading pack Posta Rangers on 10 March 2024 in what was a repeat scoreline from last season.

At the start of the season the club's top scorer last season Tyson Otieno decamped to Kenya Police FC as well as flyer Shariff Musa and goalkeeper John Otieno and defender Dan Guya who all joined Bidco United. Centre back Ian Taifa returned from Nzoia Sugar as midfilder Stanley Wilson arrived from Darajani Gogo. His exit forced the likes of Moses Shikanda who scored eight league goals in the previous season - and one less compared to Tyson - to step up and take the lead at the front alongside Fortune Omoto and utility Julius Masaba.

In the domestic cup front, Sharks improved on the quarterfinal show last season to make it to the semis only to lose out to KCB on post match penalties after a 1–1 draw. They went on to be placed fourth after going down 2–1 to AFC Leopards in the losers final.

== Technical Bench ==
Position	Staff
Head coach	(Kenya) William Muluya
Assistant head coach	(Kenya) Ezekiel Seda
Team Manager	(Kenya) Mathew Sam
Goalkeeper Trainer	(Kenya) Francis Dick
Head of Medical/Physio	(Kenya) John Kemboi
Kit Manager	(Kenya) Paul Otieno

Source: Soka

== Transfers ==
The original transfer window for the 2023-24 opened on 26 June 2023 and closed on 21 August 2023 for international transfers. However, domestic registrations ran until 15 September 2023. The mid-season transfer window was between 8 January and 8 February 2024.

=== In ===
Date	Pos.	Player	From	Ref.
19 Aug 2023	AM	(Kenya) Stanley Wilson	(Kenya) Darajani Gogo	
19 Aug 2023	AM	(Kenya) Henry Onyango	(Kenya) KCB	
19 Aug 2023	DF	(South Sudan) David Jima	(Kenya) Sharks Youth	
19 Aug 2023	FW	(Kenya) Sigmun Maina	(Kenya) Sharks Youth	
19 Aug 2023	CB	(Kenya) Ian Taifa	(Kenya) Nzoia Sugar FC	
19 Aug 2023	FW	(Kenya) Victor Ngume	(Kenya) Mara Sugar FC	
19 Aug 2023	ST	(Democratic Republic of the Congo) Donald Ange	(Kenya) Mathare United	
19 Aug 2023	FW	(Kenya) Lennox Kariuki	(Kenya) Mathare United	
19 Aug 2023	GK	(Kenya) Bernard Jairo	(Kenya) Mathare United	
19 Aug 2023	FW	(Kenya) Abdulrahman Bwanashukuri	(Kenya) Kajiado FC	

=== Out ===
Date	Pos.	Player	To	Ref.
2 Sep 2023	AM	(Kenya) Tyson Otieno	Kenya Police FC	
2 Sep 2023	FW	(Kenya) Shariff Musa	(Kenya) Bidco United	
2 Sep 2023	CB	(Kenya) Dan Guya	(Kenya) Bidco United	
2 Sep 2023	GK	(Kenya) John Otieno	(Kenya) Bidco United	
2 Sep 2023	GK	(Kenya) Gedion Ogweno	(Kenya) Muhoroni Youth	
2 Sep 2023	AM	(Kenya) Ronald Odede	(Kenya) Naivas FC	
2 Sep 2023	FW	(Kenya) Abdulrahman Bwanashukuri	(Kenya) Kajiado FC (loan)	
18 Oct 2024	LB	(Kenya) Collin Ochieng	(Denmark) AC Horsens	

=== In ===
Date	Pos.	Player	From	Ref.
9 Feb 2024	FW	(Kenya) Eric Mmata	(Kenya) Tusker FC	
9 Feb 2024	AM	(Kenya) Andres Odhiambo	(Kenya) Highway Secondary School	
9 Feb 2024	FW	(Kenya) Stephen Mbulere	(Kenya) Muhoroni Youth	
9 Feb 2024	FW	(Kenya) John Mark Makwatta	(Botswana) Gaborone United	

=== Out ===
Date	Pos.	Player	To	Ref.
9 Feb 2024	ST	(Democratic Republic of the Congo) Donald Ange	(Kenya) Mathare United	
9 Feb 2024	AM	(Kenya) Henry Onyango	(Kenya) KCB	
9 Feb 2024	ST	(Kenya) Paul Okoth	(Kenya) Sofapaka	

== Competitions ==
=== Overall record ===
Competition	First match	Last match	Starting round	Final position	Record							
Competition	First match	Last match	Starting round	Final position	Pld	W	D	L	GF	GA	GD	Win %
2023-24 KPL	26 Aug 2023	23 Jun 2024	Matchday 1	7th	34	12	12	10	44	34	+10	35.29
2023-24 Mozzart Bet Cup	24 Feb 2024	29 Jun 2024	Round of 32	4th	5	3	0	2	6	4	+2	60.00
Total					39	15	12	12	50	38	+12	38.46

Source: Soccerway

=== Kenyan Premier League ===
==== Results summary ====
Overall								Home						Away					
Pld	W	D	L	GF	GA	GD	Pts	W	D	L	GF	GA	GD	W	D	L	GF	GA	GD
34	12	12	10	44	34	+10	48	6	6	5	21	18	+3	6	6	5	23	16	+7

Source: Soccerway

==== Results by round ====
Round	1	2	3	4	5	6	7	8	9	10	11	12	13	14	15	16	17	18	19	20	21	22	23	24	25	26	27	28	29	30	31	32	33	34
Ground	H	A	H	A	H	A	H	H	A	A	H	A	H	A	H	A	H	A	A	H	A	H	H	A	H	A	H	A	H	A	H	A	H	A
Result	D	D	W	W	L	L	D	W	D	L	L	L	L	L	D	W	D	L	D	L	W	D	D	W	W	D	W	W	W	D	W	W	L	D
Position	8		6	3	5		9	5		10	12	13	13		14	13	13		15	16			15	12	12	12	12	10					8	7
Points	1	2	5	8	8	8	9	12	13	13	13	13	13	13	14	17	18	18	19	19	22	23	24	27	30	31	34	37	40	41	44	47	47	48

Source: Soccerway
A = Away; H = Home; W = Win; D = Draw; L = Loss; P = Postponed

==== Score overview ====
Win Draw Loss

Opposition	Home score	Away score	Aggregate score	Double
AFC Leopards	0-2	0-0	0-2	No
Bandari	0-2	2-2	2-4	No
Bidco Utd	0-0	1-0	1-0	No
Gor Mahia	1-2	0-1	1-3	No
Kakamega Homeboyz	1-0	1-1	2-1	No
KCB	2-1	3-0	5-1	Yes
Kenya Police	0-0	2-2	2-2	No
Muhoroni Youth	1-1	2-1	3-2	No
Muranga SEAL	1-1	0-0	1-1	No
Nairobi City Stars	0-0	1-3	1-3	No
Nzoia Sugar	3-0	0-1	3-1	No
Posta Rangers	0-1	5-1	5-2	No
Sofapaka	5-2	1-2	6-4	No
Shabana	2-1	1-0	3-1	Yes
Talanta	1-1	3-0	4-1	No
Tusker	3-2	1-1	4-3	No
Ulinzi Stars	1-2	0-1	1-3	No

==== Matches ====
Win Draw Loss Fixtures

The fixtures for the 2023-24 Kenyan Premier League season were released in mid Jul 2023, and the first set of games began on 26 August 2023. The season concluded on the 23 June 2024.

26 August 2023 1	Kariobangi Sharks	0-0	Kenya Police FC	Nairobi
15:00 UTC+3		Report

2 September 2023 2	Tusker FC	1-1	Kariobangi Sharks	Nairobi
15:00 UTC+3	Levin 82'	Report	Imbali 57'

17 September 2023 3	Kariobangi Sharks	2-1	KCB	Nairobi
15:00 UTC+3	Wilson 29'; Onyango 67'	Report	Kahiro 45'	Stadium: Dandora Stadium

23 September 2023 4	Shabana FC	0-1	Kariobangi Sharks	Nairobi
15:00 UTC+3		Report	Onyango 90'	Stadium: Gusii Stadium

30 September 2023 5	Kariobangi Sharks	0-1	Posta Rangers	Nairobi
15:00 UTC+3		Report	Otieno 6'	Stadium: Kasarani Annex

7 October 2023 6	Ulinzi Stars	1-0	Kariobangi Sharks	Nairobi
15:00 UTC+3		Report	Ochieng 32'	Stadium: Ulinzi Complex

22 October 2023 7	Kariobangi Sharks	1-1	Muhoroni Youth	Nairobi
15:00 UTC+3	Onyango 84'	Report	Okoth 55'	Stadium: Kasarani Annex

29 October 2023 8	Kariobangi Sharks	1-0	Kakamega Homeboyz	Nairobi
15:00 UTC+3	Masaba 90+4'	Report

1 November 2023 9	AFC Leopards	0-0	Kariobangi Sharks
15:00 UTC+3		Report

4 November 2023 10	Nzoia Sugar	1-0	Kariobangi Sharks	Bungoma
15:00 UTC+3	Osoro 90+1'	Report		Stadium: Sudi Stadium

28 January 2023 11	Kariobangi Sharks	0-2	Bandari	Nairobi
15:00 UTC+3		Report	Nsibambi 54', 69'	Stadium: Kasarani Annex

25 November 2023 12	Nairobi City Stars	3-1	Kariobangi Sharks	Nairobi
15:00 UTC+3	Bajaber 3'; Owino 45+2' (pen.), 46' (pen.)	Report	Onyango 56' (pen.)	Stadium: Kasarani Annex

3 December 2023 13	Kariobangi Sharks	0-1	Gor Mahia	Nairobi
15:00 UTC+3		Report	Onyango 45+1'	Stadium: Kasarani Stadium

10 December 2023 14	Sofapaka FC	2-1	Kariobangi Sharks	Nairobi
15:00 UTC+3	Msagha 62'; Mieno 79'	Report	Ange 5'	Stadium: Kasarani Annex

17 December 2023 15	Kariobangi Sharks	0-0	Bidco United	Nairobi
15:00 UTC+3		Report		Stadium: Kasarani Annex

21 December 2023 16	FC Talanta	0-3	Kariobangi Sharks
15:00 UTC+3		Report	Onyango 23'; Imbali 38'; Wilson 56'

1 March 2023 17	Kariobangi Sharks	1-1	Muranga SEAL	Nairobi
15:00 UTC+3	Wasambo 32'	Report	Kapchanga 90+2'	Stadium: Police Sacco Stadium

13 January 2024 18	Gor Mahia FC	1-0	Kariobangi Sharks	Nairobi
15:00 UTC+3	Ochieng 90+1'	Report		Stadium: Kasarani Stadium

20 January 2024 19	Bandari	2-2	Kariobangi Sharks	Mombasa
15:00 UTC+3	Kasumba 45+2'; Nsibambi 75'	Report	Ngunyi 6'; Wasambo 82'	Stadium: KPA Mbaraki

4 February 2024 20	Kariobangi Sharks	0-2	AFC Leopards	Nairobi
15:00 UTC+3		Report	Omune 49'; Munyendo 52'; Bakari (yellow card) 75' (yellow-red card) 90+2'	Stadium: Kasarani Stadium

11 February 2024 21	Muhoroni Youth	1-2	Kariobangi Sharks	Muhoroni
15:00 UTC+3	Ochieng 43'	Report	Kibiwott 7'; Imbali 83'	Stadium: Muhoroni Stadium

18 February 2024 22	Kariobangi Sharks	1-1	FC Talanta	Nairobi
15:00 UTC+3	Makwatta 77'	Report	Juma 43'	Stadium: Kasarani Annex

2 March 2024 23	Nairobi City Stars	0-0	Kariobangi Sharks	Machakos
15:00 UTC+3		Report		Stadium: Kenyatta Stadium, Machakos

10 March 2024 24	Kariobangi Sharks	1-5	Posta Rangers	Nairobi
15:00 UTC+3	Chonjo	Report	Masaba 15', 49'; Makwatta 56'; Leon 65'; Fortune 90'	Stadium: Kasarani Stadium

6 April 2024 25	Kariobangi Sharks	3-2	Tusker FC	Nairobi
15:00 UTC+3	Makwatta 22', 56'; Masaba 79'	Report	Oguta 45'; Ojok 72'	Stadium: Kasarani Annex

13 April 2024 26	Kakamega Homeboyz	1-1	Kariobangi Sharks	Kakamega
15:00 UTC+3	Batambuze 30'	Report	Shikanda 22'	Stadium: Bukhungu Stadium

24 April 2024 27	Kariobangi Sharks	3-0	Nzoia Sugar	Nairobi
15:00 UTC+3	Makwatta 65'; Omoto 68'; Wilson 71'	Report	Wekesa (yellow card) 39' (yellow-red card) 57'	Stadium: Kasarani Annex

4 May 2024 28	KCB	0-3	Kariobangi Sharks	Nairobi
15:00 UTC+3		Report	Makwatta 10', 39'; Masaba 13'	Stadium: Kasarani Annex

11 May 2024 29	Kariobangi Sharks	5-2	Sofapaka FC	Nairobi
15:00 UTC+3	Makwatta 1', 31', 63', 84'; Mbulere 28'	Report	Onyango 41'; Msagha 62'	Stadium: Kasarani Annex

15 May 2024 30	Muranga SEAL	0-0	Kariobangi Sharks	Muranga
15:00 UTC+3		Report		Stadium: Sportpesa Arena, Muranga

27 May 2023 31	Kariobangi Sharks	2-1	Shabana FC	Nairobi
15:00 UTC+3		Report	Makwatta 78', 81'	Stadium: Kasarani Annex

15 June 2024 32	Bidco United	0-1	Kariobangi Sharks	Nairobi
15:00 UTC+3		Report	Makwatta 84'}	Stadium: Kasarani Annex

19 June 2024 33	Kariobangi Sharks	1-2	Ulinzi Stars	Nairobi
15:00 UTC+3	Makwatta 61'}	Report	Mootian 2'; Bikokwa 79'	Stadium: Kasarani Annex

23 June 2024 34	Kenya Police FC	2-2	Kariobangi Sharks	Nairobi
15:00 UTC+3	Kinanga 64'}; Ouma 86'}	Report	Makwatta 10'; Kimani 23'	Stadium: Police Sacco Stadium

=== Mozzart Bet Cup ===
Win Draw Loss Fixtures

24 Feb 2024 Round of 32	Nyamira Super Eagles	0-1	Kariobangi Sharks	Mosocho
15:00 UTC+3		Report	Makwatta 89' (pen.)	Stadium: Cardinal Otunga High

30 Mar 2024 Round of 16	Ulinzi Stars FC	1-2	Kariobangi Sharks	Nairobi
15:00 UTC+3	Lumumba 2'	Report	Omoto 20'; Makwatta 82'	Stadium: Police Sacco Stadium

28 Apr 2024 Qtrs	Kariobangi Sharks	1-0	SS Asad	Nairobi
15:00 UTC+3	Makwatta 31'	Report		Stadium: Dandora Stadium

26 May 2024 Semis	Kariobangi Sharks	1(2)-1(4)	KCB	Nairobi
15:00 UTC+3	Omoto 79'	Report	Otanga 77'	Stadium: Police Sacco Stadium

29 Jun 2024 3/4th playoff	AFC Leopards	2-1	Kariobangi Sharks	Nairobi
15:00 UTC+3	Omune 16'; Bakari 32'	Report	Imbali 74'	Stadium: Ulinzi Complex

== Statistics ==
=== Goalscorers ===
No.	Pos.	Player	Premier League	Mozzart Cup	Total
24	ST	(Kenya) John Mark Makwatta	16	3	19
10	AM	(Kenya) Fortune Omoto	4	2	6
22	FW	(Kenya) Julius Masaba	6	0	6
15	LB	(Kenya) Geoffrey Onyango	5	0	5
23	CM	(Kenya) Keith Imbali	3	1	4
21	FW	(Kenya) Leonlevitt Otieno	3	0	3
5	AM	(Kenya) Isaac Wasambo	2	0	2
8	AM	(Kenya) Andres Odhiambo	2	0	2
20	CM	(Kenya) Mathew Kibiwott	2	0	2
26	ST	(Kenya) Moses Shikanda	2	0	2
19	FW	(Kenya) Stephen Mbulere	1	0	1
Own goals			0	0	0
Missing			0	0	0
Totals			44	6	50
