= List of Ligi Ndogo S.C. seasons =

Ligi Ndogo Sports Club is a professional association football club based in Nairobi, Kenya. It began as a youth academy (which still exists today) on 1 January 2002, with the senior team formed in 2005.

The club currently has no major honours, but have competed in the Kenyan Nationwide League, FKF Division One and the Kenyan National Super League. The table details the club's achievements in major competitions, and the top scorers for each documented season. Records of minor competitions such as the Jamhuri Day Cup and the Madaraka Day Cup are not included.

== Key ==
- Pld = Played
- W = Games won
- D = Games drawn
- L = Games lost
- GF = Goals for
- GA = Goals against
- GD = Goal difference
- Pts = Points
- Pos = Final position
- Div. = Division
- Comp. = Competition
- KPL = Premier League
- NSL = National Super League
- Div 1 = Division One
- NWL = Nationwide League
- Cup = FKF President's Cup
- T8 = Top 8 Cup
- Super = Super Cup
- Italics = Ongoing season/competition
- R1 = Round 1
- R2 = Round 2
- R3 = Round 3
- R32 = Round of 32
- R16 = Round of 16
- QF = Quarter-finals
- SF = Semi-finals
- F = Final

1st or W	Winners
2nd or RU	Runners-up
↑	Promoted
↓	Relegated
♦	Top scorer in division

== Seasons ==
Results of league and cup competitions by season
Season	League										Domestic			Africa		Top goalscorer	
Season	Div.	Pld	W	D	L	GF	GA	GD	Pts	Pos	Cup	T8	Super	Comp.	Result	Name	Goals
2011	NWL^{[a]}	30	22	4	4	59	18	+41	70	2nd	—	—	—	—	—	(Nigeria) Abbey Kunrumi	17
2012	Div 1	37	15	15	7	47	28	+19	60	6th	—	—	—	—	—	(Kenya) Vincent Okoth	13
2013	Div 1^{[b]}	22	12	5	5	35	22	+13	41	4th ↑	R1	—	—	—	—	(Kenya) John Njoroge	12
2014	NSL	11	3	5	3	13	13	0	14	5th	R3	—	—	—	—	(Kenya) Brian Yator	9

== Footnotes ==
- Competed in the KFF division of the league.
- Competed in Group 1 (Zone A) of the league.
