= Real estate in Kenya =

The real estate sector in Kenya has seen a boom that began somewhere in the mid to late 2000s because the property market is responding to increased demand.

In Nairobi, the capital and largest city of Kenya, there is one of the largest expatriate communities in the continent due to the significant number of multinationals who have chosen Nairobi as either their African hub or East and Central African hub. A boost in a landmark decision, the United Nations has revealed plans to set up three additional global offices in Nairobi, Kenya, by late 2026. The rebirth of property development in Nairobi has attracted global attention. In its 2012 Wealth Report, real estate management company, Knight Frank, ranked Nairobi as the fastest-growing real estate market in the world, outpacing cities like Miami and Monaco. Real estate prices in Nairobi rose 25 per cent between January and December 2011. Nairobi was also voted as one of the top 10 cities to watch by global real estate firm, Jones Lang LaSalle, out of 150 cities globally.

== Kenyan cities ==
In 2012, Nairobi and Mombasa were the only cities in the "southern hemisphere" to have reported double digit property price increases, out of 71 cities surveyed in the Prime International Residential Index. The table shows property price growth in the top cities in the survey.

Kenya

City	Country	Percentage increase between 2011 and 2012 (%)
Nairobi	Kenya	25
Mombasa	Kenya	20
Miami	USA	19.1
Bali	Indonesia	15
Jakarta	Indonesia	14.3
London	United Kingdom	12.1
Vancouver	Canada	10.4
Moscow	Russia	9.8
Toronto	Canada	8.5
Beijing	China	8.1

Source: BusinessDaily

The report noted that inflows from Kenyans in the diaspora are particularly significant in driving the prices and that the cost per square metre of land in Nairobi and Mombasa is still lower than other cities such as Monaco.

== Markets ==
Kenya's real estate market is commonly divided into office, retail, industrial and residential segments. Formal market activity is concentrated in Nairobi and its metropolitan area, although secondary urban centres such as Mombasa, Kisumu, Nakuru, Eldoret and Naivasha have also recorded property development linked to infrastructure, trade, tourism, county administration and population growth.

=== Office ===
The office market is centred mainly in Nairobi, with major office nodes including the central business district, Upper Hill, Westlands, Kilimani, Gigiri, Riverside and Mombasa Road. The sector experienced several years of oversupply following rapid development of Grade A and Grade B office buildings, especially in decentralised commercial districts outside the traditional city centre. Market reports in the mid-2020s indicated improving absorption, but also continued caution among developers because a large volume of office stock remained vacant or underutilised.

In 2025, prime office occupancy in Nairobi improved, supported by demand for higher-quality buildings, flexible workspaces and office locations with better access, parking, security and amenities. Knight Frank reported that prime office occupancy in Nairobi rose from 77.71% in June 2025 to 81.58% by December 2025, while prime office rents remained stable at about US$1.20 per square foot per month. The market has also seen growth in serviced and co-working spaces, although performance remains highly location-dependent, with Westlands continuing to be one of the strongest commercial office nodes.

=== Retail ===
Kenya's retail property market has shifted from a heavy focus on large regional shopping malls toward neighbourhood and community retail centres. This change has been driven by consumer demand for convenience, supermarket-led footfall, value retailing and expansion by local and international chains. Nairobi remains the largest formal retail market, but retail development has also expanded into other urban centres and fast-growing residential catchments.

Supermarket anchors such as Naivas, Quickmart, Carrefour and Chandarana Food Plus play an important role in the performance of shopping centres because they attract regular foot traffic for smaller line shops. Newer retail developments have increasingly targeted middle-income residential areas and commuter corridors rather than only high-end locations. Knight Frank estimated that more than 230,000 square feet of lettable retail space entered the Kenyan market in 2025, with future supply focused more on neighbourhood centres and mixed-use schemes than on large standalone malls.

=== Industrial ===
The industrial property market includes warehouses, logistics parks, manufacturing facilities, special economic zones and build-to-suit industrial space. Historically, many industrial occupiers in Kenya preferred owner-occupied premises, but the market has gradually become more formalised through serviced industrial parks, logistics developments and institutional investment in warehousing. Major industrial and logistics corridors include Mombasa Road, Athi River, Thika, Tatu City, Machakos and the route toward the Port of Mombasa.

Industrial real estate demand has been supported by manufacturing activity, logistics, e-commerce distribution, automotive assembly, cold storage, special economic zones and infrastructure investment. Tatu City, Vipingo Special Economic Zone, Nairobi Free Trade Zone and other serviced industrial locations have attracted manufacturers, logistics firms and investors seeking prepared land, utilities and regulatory incentives. In 2025, Knight Frank reported that demand for industrial space in established special economic zones and along logistics corridors such as Mombasa Road and Athi River was expected to remain strong, with increased demand for higher-specification warehouses and build-to-suit facilities.

=== Residential ===
The residential segment is one of the largest parts of Kenya's real estate market, supported by urbanisation, population growth, household formation, remittances, rental demand and long-term demand for housing in major towns. In Nairobi, residential development ranges from high-density apartment blocks in areas such as Kilimani, Kileleshwa, Westlands, Riverside and Upper Hill to gated communities, townhouses and villas in lower-density suburbs and peri-urban locations. Satellite towns and master-planned developments have also grown as buyers and renters seek relatively larger units, improved infrastructure or lower entry prices outside the city core.

Market activity has increasingly been shaped by apartment living, off-plan projects, gated communities, affordable housing programmes and institutional rental housing. However, affordability remains a structural constraint because of land prices, construction costs, mortgage rates and limited access to long-term housing finance. Knight Frank reported that residential sales price growth moderated in 2025, with its sales price index rising by 6.17% in the twelve months to December 2025 compared with 8.27% in the previous year, while prime rents increased by 4.05% compared with 7.46% a year earlier. The Kenya National Bureau of Statistics also publishes a Residential Property Price Index to track changes in average residential property prices in the country.

== Prime Global Cities Index ==
=== Q1 2013 ===
Kenya
Africa

No.	City	Country	World region	12-month (Mar 2012–13) % change	6-month (Sep 2012 – 13 Mar) % change	3-month (Dec 2012 – 13 Mar) % change	Data if not Q1
1	Jakarta	Indonesia	Asia Pacific	38.1	14.8	6.9	Q4
2	Bangkok	Thailand	Asia Pacific	26.1	7.1	5	
3	Miami	United States	North America	21.1	5.8	−0.6	
4	Dubai	UAE	Middle East	18.3	10.9	5.4	
5	Shanghai	China	Asia Pacific	17.4	13.1	2.5	
6	St Petersburg	Russia	Europe	13.1	11.9	1.8	
7	Los Angeles	USA	North America	12.5	8.6	9.4	Q4
8	Monaco	Monaco	Europe	12.2	12.2	10	
9	Hong Kong	China; Hong Kong	Asia Pacific	8.8	2.6	1.2	
10	Nairobi	Kenya	Africa	8.4	3.1	1.6	
11	San Francisco	USA	North America	8.4	2.3	−0.1	Q4
12	London	United Kingdom	Europe	8.1	3.6	2.2	
13	Beijing	China	Asia Pacific	6.3	4.9	2.7	
14	Tel Aviv	Israel	Middle East	3.7	−4.1	−5.4	Q4
15	Kuala Lumpur	Malaysia	Asia Pacific	2.8	3.2	2.3	
16	Cape Town	South Africa	Africa	1.7	1.7	1.2	
17	Mumbai	India	Asia Pacific	1	0.7	0.5	
18	Sydney	Australia	Asia Pacific	0	0.8	0.8	Q4
19	Moscow	Russia	Europe	−1.8	1.1	1.6	
20	Zurich	Switzerland	Europe	−2.5	−2.5	0	

=== Performance of luxury homes by world region ===
Q1 2013 Knight Frank Residential Research
Region	Performance of luxury homes
Middle East	11
N. America	8.3
Asia Pacific	7.8
Africa	4.3
Europe	−2.5

Source: KnightFrank

== Greater Nairobi and Nairobi Metro ==
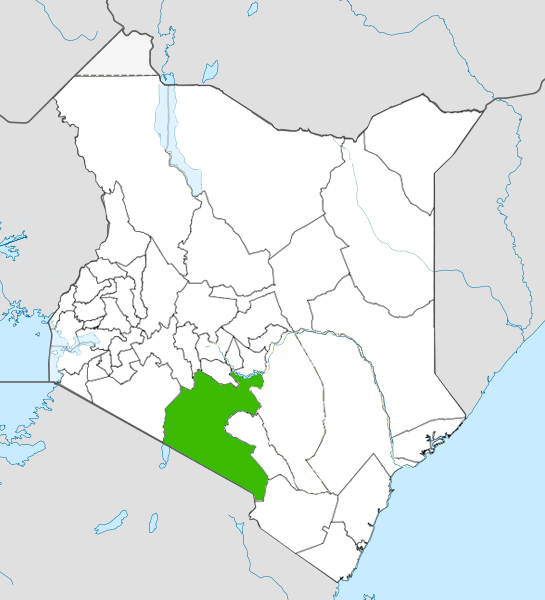
Nairobi Metro within Kenya

Greater Nairobi consists of 4 out of 47 counties in Kenya but the area generates about 60% of the nation's wealth. The counties are:

Area	County	Area (km^{2})	Population Census 2009	Cities/towns/municipalities in the counties
Core Nairobi	Nairobi County	694.9	3,138,369	Nairobi
Northern Metro	Kiambu County	2,449.2	1,623,282	Kiambu, Thika, Limuru, Ruiru, Karuri, Kikuyu
Southern Metro	Kajiado County	21,292.7	687,312	Kajiado, Olkejuado, Bissil, Ngong, Kitengela, Kiserian, Ongata Rongai
Eastern Metro	Machakos County	5,952.9	1,098,584	Kangundo-Tala, Machakos, Athi River
Totals	Nairobi Metro	30,389.7	6,547,547	

=== Nairobi (core) ===
Population of Core Nairobi between 1906 and 2009

==== Upper Hill ====
Upper Hill has become an alternative for major companies seeking land cheaper than that which is in the Central Business District of Nairobi. It is one of the two main bases multinational firms consider when setting up in Kenya or Africa. Some of the firms include but are not limited to: Cisco Systems, Citibank, Coca-Cola, Huawei and IMF.

Average annual office rents for Grade A offices in Nairobi

Upper Hill
Westlands
Nairobi CBD

View source data.

Source: KnightFrank

==== Westlands ====
Westlands is one of Nairobi's main commercial and mixed-use districts, alongside Upper Hill and the central business district. The area has attracted multinational companies, banks, technology firms, embassies, hotels, serviced apartments, restaurants and shopping centres, supported by its access to Waiyaki Way, the Nairobi Expressway, Parklands, Riverside, Lavington, Spring Valley and the wider western side of Nairobi.

Westlands has also become a major residential apartment and off-plan development market. The area's commercial base, expatriate population, hotel activity and proximity to office nodes have supported demand for apartments used by owner-occupiers, tenants, investors and short-stay residents. New residential developments in and around Westlands commonly include one-, two- and three-bedroom apartments, with buyer interest influenced by access, parking provision, building management, amenities, service charges, rental demand and resale liquidity.

The growth of apartment supply has also created concerns around absorption and pricing in parts of the Westlands market. Knight Frank's Kenya Market Update for the second half of 2025 noted that a rapid increase in apartment supply in areas such as Westlands had introduced uncertainty around absorption and pricing, even as well-located and higher-quality projects continued to attract demand.

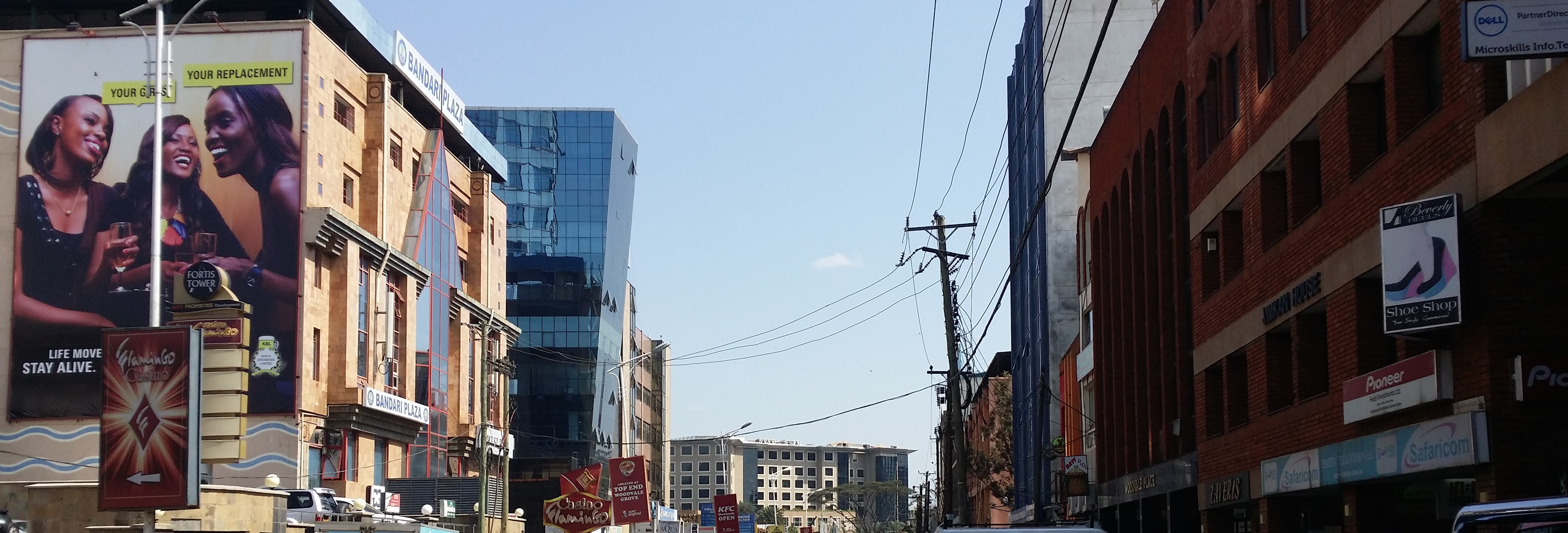
Woodvale Grove, Westlands

Westlands along with Upper Hill has become one of the two main bases for multinational firms that want to set up in Kenya or Africa. Some of the firms include but are not limited to: General Electric, Google Africa headquarters, Intel Corporation, LG and Standard Chartered Plc.

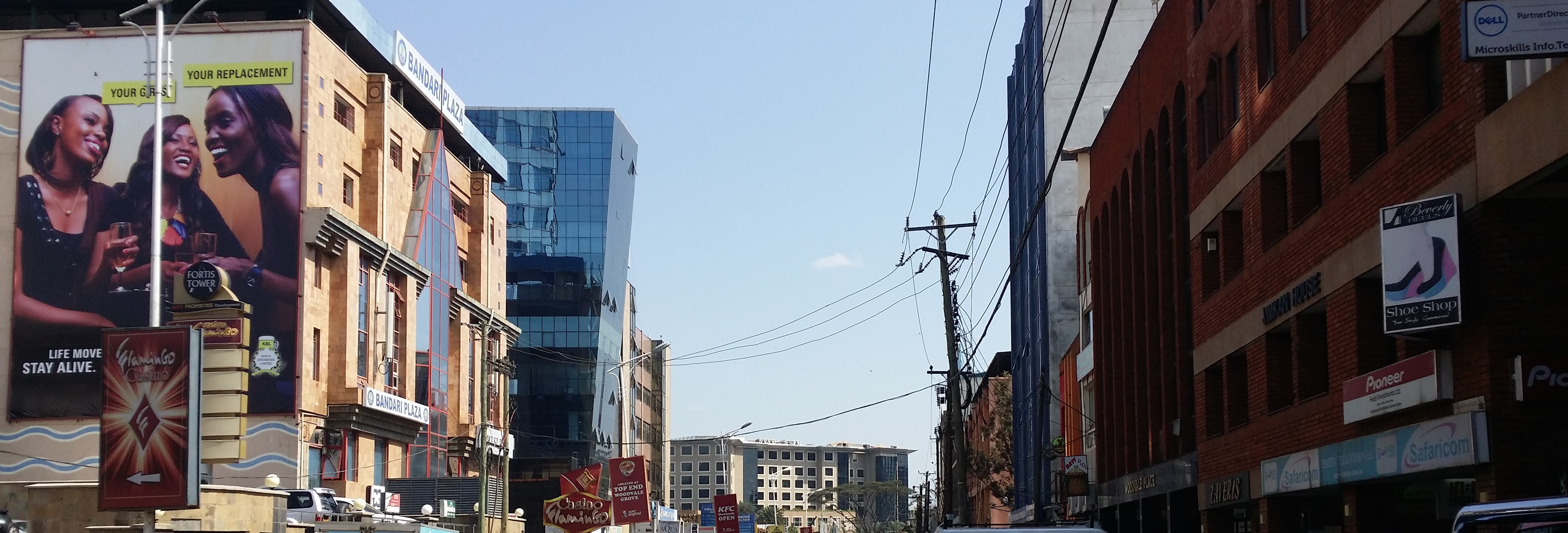
Woodvale Grove, Westlands

==== Gigiri ====
Gigiri is home to Kenya's large expatriate community. It is one of the largest expat communities in Africa. It houses the United Nations Environmental Programme. Nairobi is the only African city to host a major UN body. It also has the Village Market, which targets the expat community in Nairobi and hosts the International Civil Aviation Organization Base for Eastern and Southern Africa. Gigiri is considered one of Kenya's most posh suburbs along with Runda and Muthaiga which are really close to the place.

It is comparable to the mostly-expat-inhabited neighbourhood of Itaewon in South Korea. However, it is much smaller.

==== Runda, Muthaiga, Lavington and Karen ====
Runda, Muthaiga, Lavington and Karen are among Nairobi's established upper-income residential areas. They differ in density, access, housing stock and buyer profile, but are generally associated with larger homes, diplomatic and executive demand, gated compounds, private schools, mature infrastructure and higher land values than many other parts of the city.

Runda is a low-density gated residential area near Gigiri, the United Nations complex, embassies and diplomatic residences. Its market is shaped by demand for privacy, security, large family homes, villas and executive rental housing. New supply in Runda is less apartment-led than in inner Nairobi neighbourhoods, with more emphasis on villas, gated compounds, estate approvals, title clarity, road access and suitability for diplomatic or executive family occupation.

Muthaiga is one of Nairobi's older low-density residential suburbs and is associated with large plots, mature trees, ambassadorial residences, executive homes and proximity to the Muthaiga Golf Club, Karura Forest, Gigiri and the Nairobi central business district. Its property market is relatively illiquid because many homes sit on large parcels and change hands less frequently than apartment units in higher-density suburbs.

Lavington is an established residential suburb west of the Nairobi central business district, with a mix of older standalone homes, townhouses, gated compounds and newer apartment developments. The area is valued for its relative centrality, access to Waiyaki Way, James Gichuru Road, Gitanga Road, Othaya Road, Ngong Road and nearby shopping centres. Its housing stock has gradually shifted from mainly detached houses toward a broader mix that includes townhouses and apartments, reflecting land subdivision, densification and demand from buyers seeking both space and central access.

Karen is a lower-density residential area on the south-western side of Nairobi, known for larger plots, family homes, villas, gated estates, international schools, hospitals, shopping centres and access to the Southern Bypass, Ngong Road and Langata Road. Its market is influenced by buyers seeking space, privacy and a suburban family environment, although holding costs, commute times, water reliability, maintenance, title verification and resale liquidity remain important considerations.

The residential character of these areas has changed over time. Some older large-plot neighbourhoods have seen subdivision, townhouse development and gated-community projects as land values increased and buyers sought lower-maintenance homes. However, the market is not uniform: Runda and Karen remain more strongly associated with low-density family homes and villas, while Lavington has experienced more apartment and townhouse development because of its central location and road access. The earlier concern that Runda could lose part of its premium status because of demolitions and planning disputes reflected localised land and approval risks rather than a complete shift in the area's market position.

=== Machakos (East Metro) ===
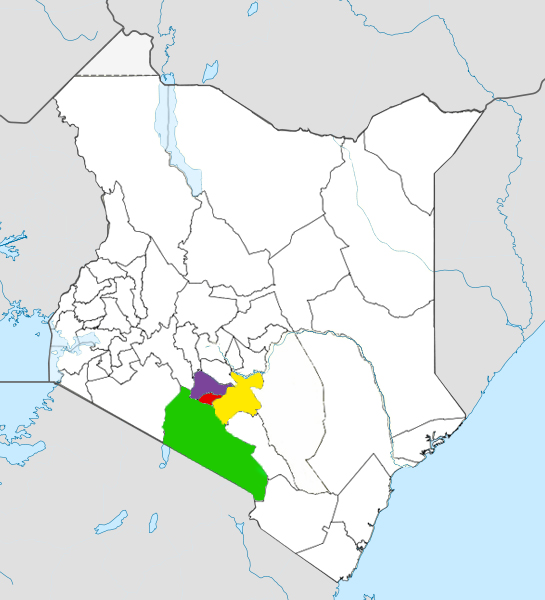
Nairobi Metro Map Nairobi County (red) Kajiado County (green) Machakos County (yellow) Kiambu County (purple)

Towns in Machakos County on the outskirts of Nairobi from the 2000s been inhabited by people who work in Nairobi. Athi River is one town that has seen people move there. This shows that people have started to prefer living outside the core of the city. Under the Nairobi 2030 Masterplan, Machakos County is to become a dormitory town for Core Nairobi.

==== Konza Techno City ====
Konza Technology City dubbed "Africa’s Silicon Valley" will be the single largest property development ever done in Kenya. It is going to host the technology city as part of many programmes that aim to steer Kenya into middle income status. It will cost a whooping US$14.5 billion after commencing in January 2013 and is to be completed by 2030.

=== Kiambu (North Metro) ===
With the recent completion of the expansion of a Thika road connecting Core Nairobi to Kiambu County, there has been a lot of property development happening like Mi Vida Garden City Apartment with the most significant being.

==== Tatu City ====
Tatu City is a property development by Moscow-based Renaissance Partners. The development will cost US$2.5 billion; groundbreaking commenced in early 2013.

=== Kajiado (South Metro) ===
Kajiado County is currently home to Kenya's richest people. There are many residential neighbourhoods that host people who work in Nairobi examples are Ngong, Kitengela, Kiserian and Ongata Rongai. Kitengela is close to Athi River which has also started rising as a popular residential area.

== Mombasa ==
Mombasa is the second-largest city in Kenya. Prime land in Mombasa is up for grabs as a property boom like the one witnessed in the 1970s continues to push up home prices in the coastal town.

=== Shanzu ===
Shanzu is also another affluent neighbourhood right past Whitesands beach hotel at Bamburi beach. The area houses high-profile housing developments.

=== English Point Marina ===
English Point Marina is a waterfront mixed-use development in Mombasa, Kenya, located near the Old Town and overlooking Tudor Creek. The project includes residential apartments, hospitality facilities, restaurants and marina-related infrastructure.

The project was opened in January 2016 by President Uhuru Kenyatta. The EastAfrican reported that the development cost about US$47 million and was financed by Kenya Commercial Bank.

Earlier reports described apartment units in the development as being priced between KSh36 million and KSh150 million, placing it in the high-end coastal residential and hospitality market.
