= Alex Karmo =

Liberian footballer

Personal information
- Full name: Alexander Began Karmo
- Date of birth: October 12, 1989 (age 37)
- Place of birth: Montserrado, Liberia
- Height: 1.76 m (5 ft 9 in)
- Position: Defender

Team information
- Current team: Västerhaninge IF

Senior career*
Years	Team	Apps	(Gls)
2003–2007	United Soccer Ambassadors	32	(1)
2007–2008	Belvic United	14	(0)
2008–2009	Akonangui FC	26	(0)
2009–2010	Western Stima	32	(1)
2010–2011	An Đô-An Giang	22	(0)
2012	Ligi Ndogo FC	28	(0)
2013	SHB Champasak	24	(2)
2014	Phichit FC	8	(0)
2014	Vinakansai Vissai	3	(0)
2015	Champasak United	31	(3)
2017	Södertälje FK	12	(2)
2017	Konyaspor KIF	4	(1)
2018	Västerhaninge IF	22	(4)
2018–2023	Afrikansk FC	16	(1)
2020	→ Fittja IF (loan)	6	(0)

International career^{‡}
2010	Liberia	3	(0)
- * Club domestic league appearances and goals as of 03:19, 2 May 2025 (UTC) ‡ National team caps and goals as of June 23, 2013

Alexander Beyam Karmo (born October 12, 1989) is a Liberian former footballer.

== International career ==
The defender is also a member of the Liberia national football team.
