= Charles Sampson (footballer) =

Ghanaian footballer

Personal information
- Full name: Charles Sampson
- Date of birth: 24 November 1980 (age 45)
- Height: 1.74 m (5 ft 9 in)
- Position: Midfielder

Youth career
- –1997: Ghapoha Readers

Senior career*
Years	Team	Apps	(Gls)
1997–1998	Kalamata	15	(1)
1998–1999	Apollon Kalamarias	15	(1)
1999–2001	Kalamata	26	(1)
2001–2002	OFI	3	(0)
2002	Panegialios	9	(0)
2003	Fostiras	12	(0)
2003–2004	Kalamata		
2004–2009	Assyriska	51	(0)
2008	→ Boden (loan)		
2009	→ Syrianska Botkyrka (loan)		
2010	Boden	19	(1)
2011–2012	IFK Luleå		
2012–2014	Syrianska Botkyrka		
2014–2015	Assyriska United		
2015–2016	→ Afrikansk (loan)		
2016–2022	Afrikansk		

International career
	Ghana U20	6	(0)

Managerial career
- 2012–2014: Assyriska United U15
- 2014–2019: Assyriska United U15 (women's)
- 2018: Syrianska U19
- 2019–2023: Telge United
- * Club domestic league appearances and goals

Charles Sampson (born 24 November 1980) is a Ghanaian international footballer, who currently plays for IFK Luleå.

== Club career ==
Sampson moved to Greece in July 1997, initially joining Greek first division side Kalamata F.C. for one season. He spent the following season in the Greek second division with Apollon Kalamarias F.C., and then returned to Kalamata for two more seasons. He moved to OFI for the following season, but only appeared in three league matches, for a total of 40 Greek top flight matches during his career.

Sampson would later play in the lower divisions for Panegialios F.C. and Fostiras F.C., before returning to Kalamata for the 2003–04 Greek second division season.

Sampson joined Swedish side Assyriska Föreningen in 2004. He would help the club earn promotion to the Allsvenskan and play in the league the following season. Assyriska loaned Sampson to Bodens BK for the 2008 season, and he would later join Boden on a permanent transfer in 2010.

== International career ==
Sampson made six appearances for the Ghana national under-20 team.
