= Ngong Forest =

Natural forest in Nairobi, Kenya

- Location within Kenya
- Location: Ngong Road, Nairobi, Kenya
- Coordinates: 1°18′59.12″S 36°44′30.13″E
- Area: 1,224 hectares (3,020 acres)
- Operator: Ngong Road Forest Sanctuaries

Ngong Forest is one of the few natural forests in the capital city of Kenya. It is located along Ngong Road, 6 kilometres (3.7 miles) from Nairobi's central business district. Managed by the Ngong Road Forest Sanctuaries, this habitat of indigenous trees is home to many wild animals, including leopards, spotted hyenas, and Cape bushbucks. Other animal residents include crowned eagles, owls, snakes, and many other birds and reptiles.

Ngong Forest, which extends to Rift Valley Province, has undergone deforestation due to the settlement of Karen and Ngong, as well as to the development of the Lenana School and the Ngong Racecourse. These events have reduced Ngong Forest's original 2,926.6 hectares (7,232 acres) to the current 1,224 hectares (3,020 acres).
