= Karen, Kenya =

Affluent suburb of Nairobi in Kenya

Coordinates: 1.3198°S 36.6988°E

Karen is a suburb of Nairobi in Kenya, lying south-west of Nairobi's central business district.

The suburb of Karen borders the Ngong Forest and is home to the Ngong Racecourse. Karen and Langata previously formed a somewhat isolated area of mid- to high-income residents, but the two suburbs have become increasingly interconnected and linked to the rest of Nairobi through the expansion of Langata Road and Ngong Road, the latter project completed in 2021.

== History ==
Karen was previously in Ngong County. After Nairobi received city status in 1950, the counties were redefined. In 1963 Karen was placed under the Nairobi City Council's administration.

It is generally considered that the suburb is named after Karen Blixen, the Danish author of the colonial memoir Out of Africa. Her farm occupied the land where the suburb now stands. Blixen declared in her later writings that "the residential district of Karen" was "named after me," although this has never been formally recognised.

Blixen's home is still standing and forms the centrepiece of the Karen Blixen Museum, a key local tourist attraction.

On 1 September 2017 the first interreligious conference of the DIMMID in Africa took place at the Subiaco Center of the Missionary Benedictine Sisters of Tutzing.

== Cityscape ==
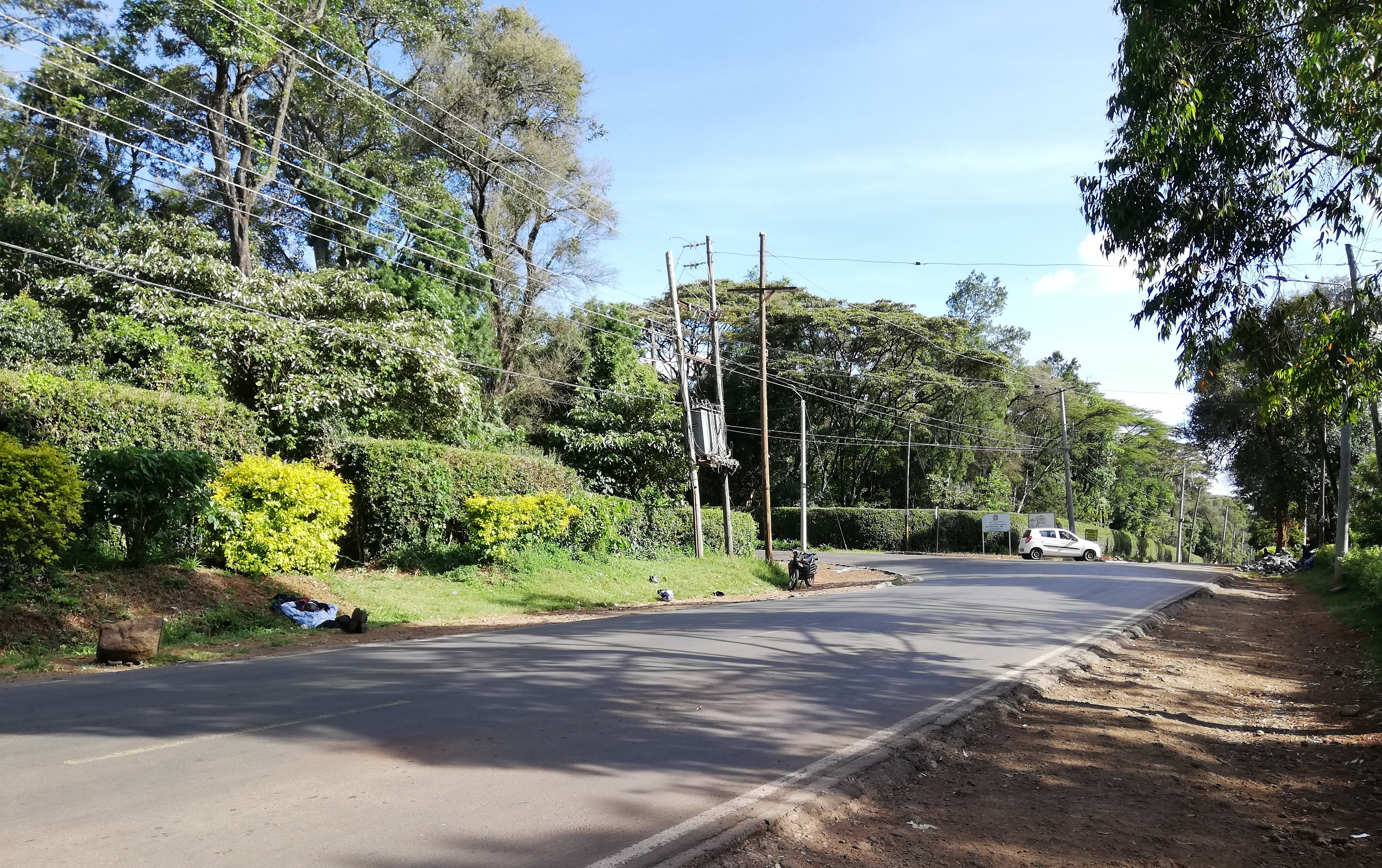
A road in Karen

Karen is a residential suburb characterised by large houses, tree cover, and low-density zoning. The area has minimum acreage requirements for residential development.

It is also home to upscale restaurants, hotels, and shopping centres such as The Hub and The Waterfront. There is a branch of the Red Cross in Karen.

== Government ==
The Karengata Association manages Karen and Langata. It was organised in 1940 and by 2010 it had begun to manage local infrastructure.

== Demographics ==
Karen is mainly populated by wealthier Kenyan households, members of the political class, and expatriates.

== Education ==
The West Nairobi School is located in Karen.

The Nairobi Japanese School is located in the nearby Lang'ata area.

== Security incidents ==
In 2012, Gerald Loughran, a British expatriate and former British Army soldier, and his wife were killed during an armed home invasion in Karen, Nairobi. In 2013, Edward Charles Loden, a former British Army officer, was shot dead during a robbery at a residential property in the Langata, Nairobi while visiting family. Loden was a British Army officer who served in the Parachute Regiment during Bloody Sunday in 1972.

== Notable residents ==
- Ellinor Catherine Cunningham van Someren (1915–1988), entomologist
- Jan Bonde Nielsen, oil tycoon
