= West Nairobi School =

International School in Karen, Nairobi

- Karen, Nairobi; Kenya

Information
- School type: International school
- Religious affiliation: Christianity
- Established: 1996; 30 years ago
- Grades: Preschool - Grade 12
- Language: English
- Website: westnairobischool.org

West Nairobi School (WNS) is a Christian international school in Karen, Nairobi, Kenya using a North American curriculum. It opened in Kilimani, Nairobi in 1996. In 2000 the school moved to its current campus. It serves early childhood through 12th grade.
