= Ngong Racecourse =

Thoroughbred racecourse in Kenya

Coordinates: 1°18′35″S 36°44′35″E

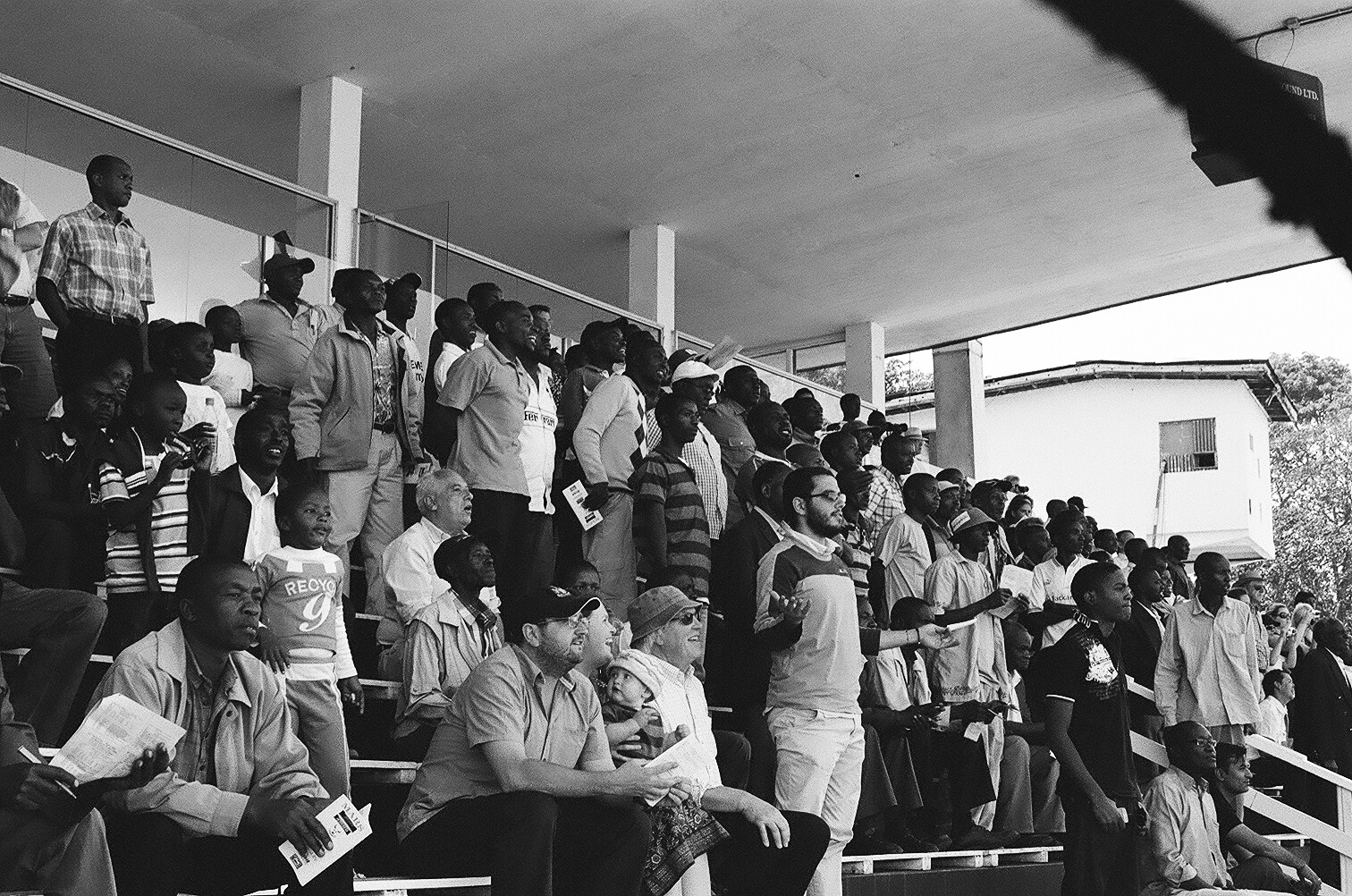
Ngong Race Court, Nairobi, Kenya 2011

Ngong Racecourse is a racecourse in Nairobi, Kenya. It is the main and currently only thoroughbred racing venue in Kenya. It is located along the Ngong Road near the Lenana School and next to The Nairobi Business Park, beside ngong forest. It is operated by the Jockey Club of Kenya.

The racecourse was opened 1954, when it replaced the old racecourse in Kariokor, near Nairobi CBD. Ngong Racecourse is nowadays the only racecourse in Kenya although there were races in other towns, including Eldoret, Nakuru, Nanyuki and Limuru. The first horse racing event in Kenya took place in 1904 in Machakos with Somali ponies.

There are on average 25 race meetings annually of which the most prominent is the annual Kenya Derby, which was first held in 1914. Races are held there on alternate Sundays. Apart from horse racing, the venue has used for cross country running competitions, and it has acted as a special stage for the Safari Rally. It has also been used for Ostrich racing.
