= Ayub Masika =

Kenyan footballer (born 1992)

Personal information
- Full name: Ayub Timbe Masika
- Date of birth: 10 September 1992 (age 34)
- Place of birth: Nairobi, Kenya
- Height: 1.70 m (5 ft 7 in)
- Position: Winger

Team information
- Current team: Crossing Schaerbeek
- Number: 11

Youth career
- 2004: Ligi Ndogo
- 2005–2006: JMJ Academy
- 2006–2008: Anderlecht
- 2008–2010: Germinal Beerschot
- 2010–2011: Genk

Senior career*
Years	Team	Apps	(Gls)
2011–2016	Genk	30	(0)
2014–2016	→ Lierse (loan)	42	(8)
2016–2017	Lierse	20	(6)
2017–2020	Beijing Renhe	49	(17)
2018	→ Heilongjiang Lava Spring (loan)	6	(2)
2020	→ Reading (loan)	2	(0)
2021	Vissel Kobe	8	(0)
2021–2022	Buriram United	13	(2)
2023	Nanjing City	20	(1)
2024	Sabail	14	(0)
2026–	Crossing Schaerbeek	6	(1)

International career
2012–2024	Kenya	31	(5)
- * Club domestic league appearances and goals as of 28 June 2026

Ayub Timbe Masika (Kenyan English: [aˈjub ˈtimbe maˈsika]; born 10 September 1992) is a Kenyan professional footballer who plays as a winger for Crossing Schaerbeek.

== Club career ==
=== Early career ===
Masika was born on 10 September 1992 in Pumwani, an estate in Nairobi, Kenya.

He moved through several academies in Kenya, including that of Ligi Ndogo, before moving to the Anderlecht Academy from the JMJ Youth Academy in 2006 at the age of 13, where he stayed for two years before moving to the Beerschot A.C. (then Germinal Beerschot) academy in 2008.

=== Genk ===
In May 2010, Masika signed a two-year deal with Genk from Germinal Beerschot. He played for the club's reserve team until he signed a new 4-year contract with the club in June 2011. He made his debut for the club when he came on in the 82nd minute for Nadson in a 1–1 draw against Zulte Waregem on 15 January 2012. He got his first assist for the club on his second appearance during their 5–0 win over Oud-Heverlee Leuven on 29 January 2012 when he delivered the ball to Christian Benteke for the fifth goal of the match. He scored his first goal for Genk in their 2–0 UEFA Europa League play-off round win against Swiss opponents FC Luzern, in the 88th minute, on 30 August 2012 at the Cristal Arena.

=== Lierse ===
On 1 September 2014, Masika was loaned Lierse from Genk for two seasons, with an option to buy at the end of the loan. He made his debut for the side in a 2–2 draw in the league against Anderlecht on 13 September, coming on in the 68th minute for Wanderson. He scored his first goal for the club on 24 September, opening the score in a 4–0 Belgian Cup win over Sint-Truiden.

In July 2016, Lierse signed Timbe on a permanent three-year deal.

=== Beijing Renhe ===
Masika joined China League One side Beijing Renhe in February 2017. He scored eight goals in his first season to help win promotion to the Chinese Super League. The following season, he was loaned back to the second tier to play for Heilongjiang Lava Spring, though he also scored seven goals in 14 games in the top flight for Beijing Renhe. On 31 January 2020 – transfer deadline day in England – Masika joined EFL Championship side Reading on loan until the end of the season.

=== Vissel Kobe ===
On 1 March 2021, Masika joined J1 League side Vissel Kobe. On 12 August, he mutually terminated his contract with Vissel Kobe.

=== Buriram United ===
On 2 December 2021, Masika joined Thai League 1 side Buriram United.

=== Nanjing City ===
On 4 April 2023, Masika joined China League One side Nanjing City.

=== Sabail ===
On 21 January 2024, Azerbaijan Premier League club Sabail announced the signing of Masika on a contract until the end of the season. Masika announced his depart from Sabail on 14 July 2024.

=== Crossing Schaerbeek ===
On 2 January 2026, Crossing Schaerbeek announced the signing of Masika on a contract until the summer of 2027.

== International career ==
Masika was meant to play in a 2013 Africa Cup of Nations preliminary round match against Togo on 29 February 2012, but could not fly back to Kenya as he had club commitments with Genk that day. However, he made his international debut for Kenya against South Africa on 16 October 2012, coming on as a substitute for Thika United forward Francis Kahata in the 61st minute. Kenya lost the match 2–1.

Masika was called up to the Kenya national team once again for a friendly against Libya to be played on 6 February 2013, but refused to play, claiming that the Football Kenya Federation owed him money from his last appearance for the team against Tanzania. He made his return to the side on 18 May 2014, starting and playing the full 90 minutes in a 2015 Africa Cup of Nations qualification match against Comoros. Masika scored his first goal for the national team 12 days later in the second leg, scoring a free kick to secure a 2–1 aggregate win for the Harambee Stars and a second round match-up against Lesotho.

== Career statistics ==
=== Club ===
As of match played 12 May 2024

Appearances and goals by club, season and competition
Club	Season	League (Note: Includes Belgian Pro League, the Championship play-offs, the Europa League play-offs and the Belgian Second Division play-offs.)			National cup (Note: Includes Belgian Cup, and the Belgian Supercup.)		League cup		Continental (Note: Includes UEFA Champions League and the UEFA Europa League.)		Total	
Club	Season	Division	Apps	Goals	Apps	Goals	Apps	Goals	Apps	Goals	Apps	Goals
Genk	2011–12	Belgian Pro League	6	0	0	0	—		0	0	6	0
Genk	2012–13	Belgian Pro League	11	0	1	0	—		4	1	16	1
Genk	2013–14	Belgian Pro League	12	0	4	0	—		3	0	19	0
Genk	2014–15	Belgian Pro League	1	0	0	0	—		0	0	1	0
Genk	Total		30	0	5	0	—		7	1	42	1
Lierse (loan)	2014–15	Belgian Pro League	20	1	1	1	—		—		21	2
Lierse (loan)	2015–16	Belgian Second Division	22	7	1	0	—		—		23	7
Lierse (loan)	Total		42	8	2	1	—		—		44	9
Lierse	2016–17	Belgian Second Division	20	6	1	1	—		—		21	7
Beijing Renhe	2017	China League One	23	8	0	0	—		—		23	8
Beijing Renhe	2018	Chinese Super League	14	7	0	0	—		—		14	7
Beijing Renhe	2019	Chinese Super League	12	2	0	0	—		—		12	2
Beijing Renhe	Total		49	17	0	0	—		—		49	17
Heilongjiang Lava Spring (loan)	2018	China League One	6	2	1	0	—		—		7	2
Reading (loan)	2019–20	Championship	5	0	1	0	—		—		6	0
Vissel Kobe	2021	J1 League	8	0	2	0	5	2	—		15	2
Buriram United	2021–22	Thai League 1	13	2	4	1	4	1	0	0	21	4
Buriram United	2022–23	Thai League 1	—		1	1	0	0	—		1	1
Buriram United	Total		13	2	5	2	4	1	0	0	22	5
Nanjing City	2023	China League One	20	1	1	1	—		—		21	2
Sabail	2023–24	Azerbaijan Premier League	14	0	2	0	—		—		16	0
Career total			207	36	20	4	9	3	7	1	243	44

=== International ===
Appearances and goals by national team and year
National team	Year	Apps	Goals
Kenya	2012	2	0
Kenya	2013	0	0
Kenya	2014	3	1
Kenya	2015	5	1
Kenya	2016	5	2
Kenya	2017	1	0
Kenya	2018	1	0
Kenya	2019	7	0
Total		24	4

Scores and results list Kenya's goal tally first, score column indicates score after each Masika goal.

List of international goals scored by Ayub Masika
No.	Date	Venue	Opponent	Score	Result	Competition
1	30 May 2015	Stade Said Mohamed Cheikh, Mitsamiouli, Comoros	Comoros	1–0	1–1	2015 Africa Cup of Nations qualification
2	7 October 2015	Stade Anjalay, Belle Vue Maurel, Mauritius	Mauritius	2–0	5–2	2018 FIFA World Cup qualification
3	4 June 2016	Moi International Sports Centre, Nairobi, Kenya	Congo	1–1	1–2	2017 Africa Cup of Nations qualification
4	4 September 2016	Levy Mwanawasa Stadium, Ndola, Zambia	Zambia	1–1	1–1	2017 Africa Cup of Nations qualification
5	23 March 2024	Bingu National Stadium, Lilongwe, Malawi	Malawi	3–0	4–0	2024 Four Nations Football Tournament

== Honours ==
Genk

- Belgian Cup: 2012–13

Buriram United

- Thai League 1: 2021–22
- Thai FA Cup: 2021–22
- Thai League Cup: 2021–22
