= Ligi Ndogo S.C. Academy =

Ligi Ndogo Academy
- Full name: Ligi Ndogo Soccer Club Academy
- Nicknames: The Planets, Ligi
- Founded: 1 January 2002 (24 years ago)
- Ground: Ligi Ndogo Grounds, Nairobi, Kenya
- Capacity: 2,000
- Chairman: Chris Amimo
- Head coach: Ibrahim Mbikalo
Home colours	Away colours	Third colours

The Ligi Ndogo Soccer Club Academy, commonly known as simply Ligi Ndogo, is the youth team of Ligi Ndogo Sports Club, and acts as a feeder program for the senior team. The academy director and under-17 head coach is Ibrahim Mbikalo.

The academy fields teams from under-9 to under-19 level that participate in various national and international competitions, but also accommodates boys and girls from the age of four upwards. Notable alumni of the academy include Swedish international John Guidetti and Kenyan international Ayub Masika.

== History ==
The academy was established on 1 January 2002 by current club chairman Chris Amimo and Karani Nyamu. The academy's first season began in February 2002, as just a place for neighbourhood children to go and play some football. Upon discovering that many of the children actually had talent, the administration formed the various age groups found in the academy today and formed a "Planets" team, which consisted of the best players from these age groups, to represent the club at national and international tournaments.

In 2005, the senior football team was formed on the initiative of current academy director and former senior team coach, Ibrahim Mbikalo and Amimo. Ligi Ndogo gained their first honours by winning the Private Secondary Schools' League in 2005, and played in the Kiko Cup towards the end of the year, crashing out through a 3–2 loss to Kibera Combined on spot kicks.

== Structure ==
A Kenyan news report done on the Ligi Ndogo Academy.

The academy's program is divided into three seasons each calendar year: January–April, May–August and September–December, with a typical season lasting 10 to 12 weeks. Apart from being a football school with several semi-professional coaches on the payroll, the academy fielded an internal league season at each age level with regular matches, training sessions and tournaments. Upon registration, players are evaluated and placed in teams which are categorized based on age and skill level:

- "Atoms" – ages 4 to 7
- "Juniors" – ages 8 to 9
- "Lower Mids" – ages 10 to 12
- "Upper Mids" – ages 13 to 14

These categories are further divided into teams named after the planets of the Solar System. The atoms have five teams: Mercury, Jupiter, Mars, Neptune and Suns. The juniors have Neptune, Mars, Jupiter and Pluto while the Mids have Jupiter and Neptune. A formal program is also offered where parents can get involved as referees, linesmen, team parents, team sponsors, handlers and cheerleaders.

As the Football Kenya Federation does not organize national youth leagues in Kenya, teams from the academy regularly compete in the Keele International Cup (formerly the Umbro International Cup), which has been won before by the academy's various teams, as well as various tournaments within the country. Players from the academy have attracted attention from professional football clubs such as Crystal Palace, Everton and Liverpool.

Ownership and Sponsorship

Ligi Ndogo was Founded by Chris Amimo and Karani Nyamu and in its infancy was supported by Milo, who had naming rights to the grounds and brand.

== Notable academy graduates ==
John Guidetti is a notable former player at the academy, having joined the under-13 team in 2003. After leaving in 2005 to return to IF Brommapojkarna, he signed a three-year deal with Manchester City as a 16-year-old in 2008.

Nat.	Name	Date of birth (age)	Years at academy	Club after academy	Current club^{[a]}	Source(s)
(Kenya)	Sven Yida	18 December 1998 (age 27)	February 2006–November 2015	(Kenya) Sharks	(Kenya) Sharks	
(Nigeria)	Jeremiah Bright	30 May 1993 (age 33)	April 2010–November 2012	(Kenya) Tusker	(Kenya) Ligi Ndogo	
(Sweden)	John Guidetti	15 April 1992 (age 34)	September 2003–December 2005	(Sweden) IF Brommapojkarna	(Spain) Alavés	
(Kenya)	Ayub Masika	10 September 1992 (age 34)	January–December 2004	(Kenya) JMJ Academy	(Belgium) Lierse	
(Kenya)	Humphrey Mieno	25 September 1989 (age 37)	February–September 2004	(Kenya) Sofapaka	(Kenya) Tusker	
(Kenya)	Paul Thiong'o	12 August 1995 (age 31)	January–December 2004	(Kenya) Impala	(Italy) Colligiana	

a. Current club as of 7 October 2015.

== Honours ==
- Kenya Private Secondary Schools League (1): 2005
