= Stanley Wilson (footballer) =

Kenyan footballer

Personal information
- Full name: Stanley Wilson Omondi
- Date of birth: 21 August 2006 (age 20)
- Place of birth: Nakuru, Kenya
- Height: 1.79 m (5 ft 10 in)
- Position: Midfielder

Team information
- Current team: AIK
- Number: 21

Youth career
- Darajani Gogo FC

Senior career*
Years	Team	Apps	(Gls)
2023–2024	Kariobangi Sharks	3	(0)
2024–	AIK	11	(0)
2025	→ Enköpings SK (loan)	9	(1)

International career^{‡}
2024–	Kenya	1	(0)
- * Club domestic league appearances and goals as of 14:36, 8 June 2026 (UTC) ‡ National team caps and goals as of 14:36, 8 June 2026 (UTC)

Stanley Wilson Omondi (born 21 August 2006) is a Kenyan footballer who plays as a midfielder for AIK in the Allsvenskan and the Kenya national team.

== Club career ==
=== Early career ===
Wilson grew up in Kariobangi, a neighbourhood in the Kenyan capital Nairobi. He began playing football at Darajani Gogo FC from a young age before being signed by Kariobangi Sharks, who compete in the Kenyan Premier League.

In January 2024, Swedish club AIK invited Wilson to a trial during the club's pre-season training camp in Marbella.

=== AIK ===
==== 2024: Signing and debut in Allsvenskan ====
On 22 August 2024, Wilson signed for AIK on a contract running until 31 December 2027, with AIK paying a reported €181,000 transfer fee to Kariobangi Sharks. He made his debut for the club on 31 August 2024 in a 1–0 victory over IFK Värnamo at Finnvedsvallen, coming on as a second-half substitute for Onni Valakari.

==== 2025: Loan to Enköpings SK ====
Wilson began the 2025 season in AIK's first-team squad, making two appearances in the group stage of the Svenska Cupen, but the team failed to qualify for the knockout rounds. With limited trust from then-head coach Mikkjal Thomassen, he was moved to the club's under-19 side in the Juniorallsvenskan. On 25 August 2025, he joined AIK's partner club Enköpings SK on loan for the remainder of the season.

Wilson made his debut for Enköpings SK on 31 August 2025, playing the full match in a 2–0 defeat against Vasalunds IF at Skytteholms IP. He scored his first goal for the club two rounds later on 14 September 2025, netting with a long-range strike against ThorenGruppen as Enköping won 3–2. He made 9 appearances in total for Enköping, starting 8, as the club finished eleventh in Division 1 – Norra.

==== 2026: Return to AIK and new role ====
Wilson returned to AIK ahead of the 2026 season under new head coach José Riveiro, who deployed him primarily as an inverted left back in a 4–3–3 formation rather than his natural midfield role, with Wilson moving into central areas during build-up play to function as an extra midfielder.

He started in AIK's 2–1 victory over Halmstads BK on 5 April 2026 in the opening Allsvenskan fixture, playing 89 minutes and contributing an assist to Zadok Yohanna's winning goal. He went on to start all nine of AIK's opening league matches, and on 24 May 2026 assisted Bersant Celina's winning goal in a 2–1 derby victory over Hammarby IF at 3Arena.

On 5 June 2026, Wilson extended his contract with AIK until 31 December 2029.

== International career ==
Wilson was called up to the Kenya national football team by coach Engin Fırat during the September 2023 international window, sitting on the bench in a 1–0 defeat against South Sudan on 12 September 2023 without featuring. He made his senior debut on 30 June 2024, coming on as a substitute for John Ochieng in the 55th minute of a 2–0 defeat against the Comoros.

== Playing style ==
Wilson is a versatile midfielder primarily used in a defensive or central role, with his main strengths lying in his football intelligence and technical ability. Under José Riveiro in the 2026 season he has also been deployed as an inverted left back, moving centrally during the build-up phase to act as an additional midfielder.
