= Victor Omune =

Kenyan footballer

Victor Omune is a Kenyan striker currently in the ranks of Kenyan Premier League side AFC Leopards, and the Kenya National team.

Omune formerly turned out for FC Kariobangi Sharks, Mahakama FC, Muhoroni Youth, Nairobi Stima F.C. and KCB before returning to Leopards in 2021 for a second time.
