= Chris Amimo =

Kenyan sports administrator

Co-opted FKF National Executive Committee (NEC) Member
- In office 17 Oct 2020 – to date

FKF Nairobi NEC Member
- In office 10 Feb 2016 – 17 Oct 2020
- Preceded by: Simon Mugo
- Succeeded by: Michael Majua

Tournament Director, Sakata Ball
- In office 2010–2012

Tournament Director, Chapa Dimba, East Africa Cup
- In office 2017 – to date

Director, Ligi Ndogo S.C. Academy
- In office 2002 – to date

Personal details
- Born: Chris Amimo; 12 October 1972 (age 54) Kakamega, Kenya

Chris Isiaiah Ongondo Amimo (born 12 October 1972) is the co-founder and chair of Kenyan soccer farm Ligi Ndogo S.C. Academy as well as the tournament director for the age-grade and nationwide youth tournament Chapa Dimba.

He also serves as the executive committee member, and as the chair of both the youth and finance committees with the Football Kenya Federation.

== Early life and education ==
Amimo was born in Kakamega County on 12 October 1972. He attended All Saints Kindergarten before proceeding to City Primary School. For his secondary education, he attended Lenana School between 1987 and 1990. He then moved to the University of Nairobi and attained a Bachelor of Commerce degree (Marketing Option).

While at Lenana, he largely played rugby alongside football which was considered a lesser sport at the establishment. In Varsity he concentrated on rugby and turned out for the resident side Mean Machine RFC, and went on to feature for Mwamba RFC at club level.

== Career ==
After college he initiated and managed corporate sporting events, including 3-on-3 junior basketball challenge in 1996 and 1997 under the banner of Sports Promotions. It later morphed to Spriteball series that ran across East Africa from the year 1998 to 2000. In 2002 he co-founded Ligi Ndogo S.C. Academy alongside Karani Nyamu as a baseline for developing and nurturing youth talent.

Amimo has overseen the running of age grade tournaments including the East Africa Cup from 2004, Sakata Ball from 2010 to 2012, and Chapa Dimba from 2017 as the tournament director across all.

In 2016 he was elected as FKF Nairobi National Executive Committee Member. After his four-year tenure, he was retained as an executive member after being co-opted on a four-year cycle, from October 2020.
