= Sven Yida =

Kenyan footballer (born 1998)

Sven Yidah
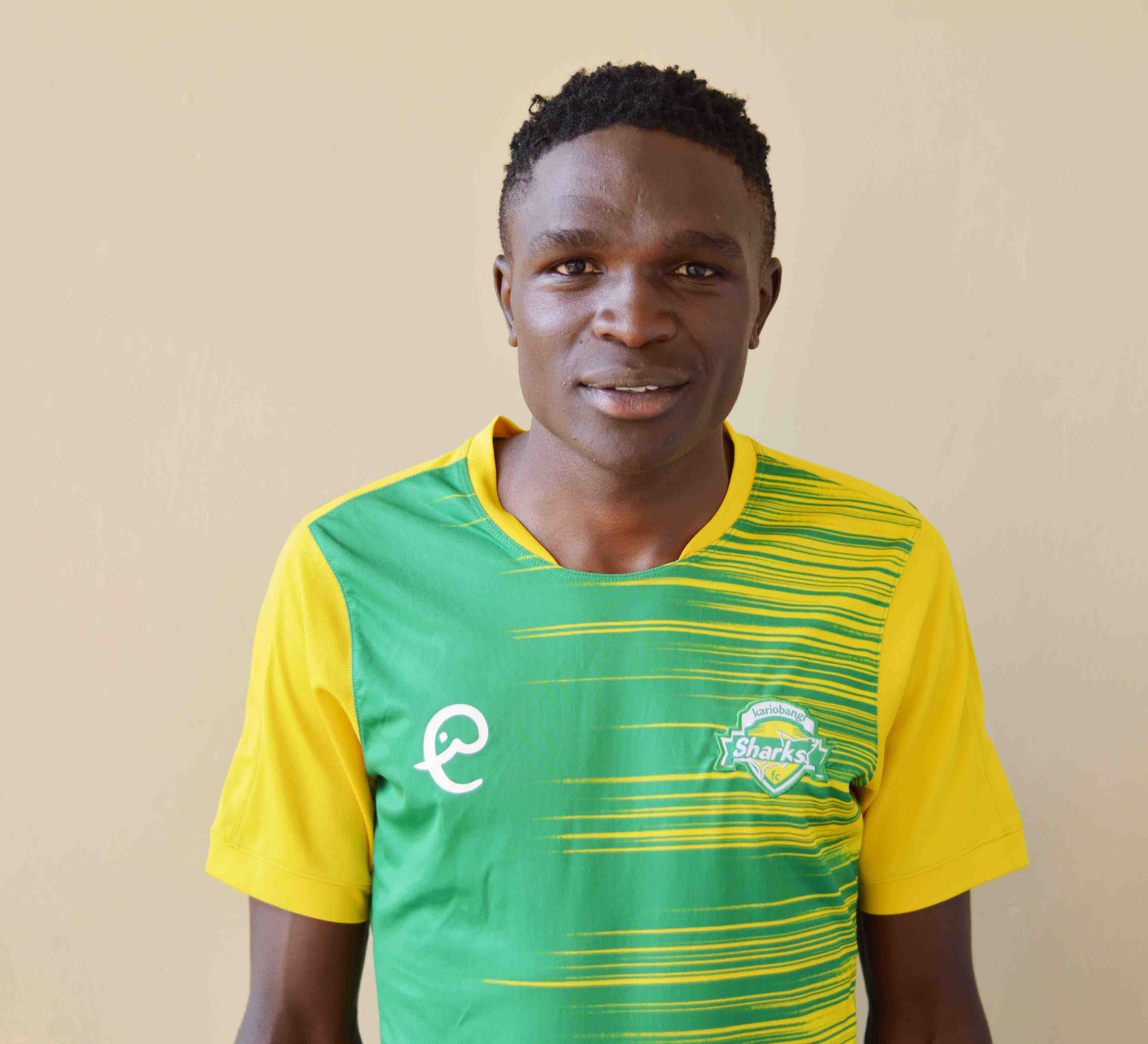
- Sven Yidah

Personal information
- Full name: Sven Yidah
- Date of birth: 18 December 1998 (age 27)
- Place of birth: Nairobi, Kenya
- Height: 1.81 m (5 ft 11 in)
- Position: Midfielder

Team information
- Current team: Nairobi City Stars F.C.
- Number: 42

Youth career
- 2004: Ligi Ndogo

Senior career*
Years	Team	Apps	(Gls)
2017–2020	Kariobangi Sharks	97	(7)
2020–2022	Nairobi City Stars	59	(3)
2022–2023	Marumo Gallants F.C.	3	(0)
2024-	Nairobi City Stars F.C.	0	(0)

International career
2019–2021	Kenya U-23	6	(0)
- * Club domestic league appearances and goals

Sven Yidah (born 18 December 1998 in Nairobi) is a Kenyan professional footballer who plays for South Africa's Premier Soccer League side Marumo Gallants F.C. and the Kenya national football team as a midfielder.

== Career ==
Yidah started out at Ligi Ndogo S.C. Academy before making a switch to FC Kariobangi Sharks in January 2016 for an initial four seasons. He extended his stay at the club at the end of the 2018 season for another three seasons to the end of the year 2021. He left Kariobangi Sharks before expiry of his contract to join Nairobi City Stars in September 2020 on a two-year deal. Upon expiry of his contract, Sven crossed borders to try out with South African top-tier side Marumo Gallants F.C. that features in the Premier Soccer League. Weeks later, he was taken in after an official (free) transfer from Nairobi City Stars.

Yidah is best remembered for his distinctive penalty celebrations against M'Bao FC in the 2019 Kenyan Cup, which became a global phenomenon. He replicated that after scoring a penalty against Everton.

== Kenya U-23 ==
In July 2021 he made the Kenya U23 squad that traveled to Bahir Dar, Ethiopia for the CECAFA Under-23 Challenge Cup.

== Honours ==
=== Club ===
Kariobangi Sharks

- Kenyan Nationwide League

(silver) Runners-up (1): 2016

- GOtv Shield

(gold) Champion (1): 2018
(silver) Runners-up (2): 2017, 2019

- Kenyan Super Cup

(gold) Champion (1): 2018/19

- SportPesa Super Cup

(gold) Champion (1): 2019

- SportPesa Trophy

(gold) Champion (1): 2019
