= Runda =

Suburb of Nairobi, Kenya

- Location within Kenya
- Coordinates: 1°12′50″S 36°48′32″E
- Country: Kenya
- County: Nairobi City
- Sub-county: Westlands (Note: Some northern areas in Runda are domiciled in Kiambu.)
- Elevation: 1,727 m (5,666 ft)
- Time zone: GMT + 3

Runda is an affluent neighbourhood located in the northern part of Nairobi. The name Runda was borrowed from the name of the coffee estate that existed in the area before it became a residential area; (Note: Civil Appeal 70 of 1982."Civil Appeal 70 of 1982: (Simpson C.J., Potter and Kneller JJ.A.)". National Council for Law Reporting (Kenya Law). Republic of Kenya, Court of Appeal at Nairobi. 1983-06-17 [1983-05-18]. ": App licant: Industrial & Commercial Development Corporation vs Respondent: J. Kemuma Onyango & 3 Others; Cases: Olivia Siqueira E Facho and another vs ER Sequeira and Others: * Appeal from the High Court at Nairobi, (Chesoni, J.). [1933] 15 KLR 34; * Ujagar Sing Runda Coffee Estates Ltd [1966] EA 263; * KM Muli for Appellant; SM Munikah for Respondents; ") it is not an abbreviation for Reserved United Nations Development Area, as many think; the name "Runda" existed even before the United Nations Environment Programme (UNEP) was formed and decided to have their headquarters in Nairobi in 1972. The coffee estate was owned by Runda Estates Ltd. Runda is one of the suburbs of the city of Nairobi, and is generally regarded as one of the richest suburbs.

== Overview ==
It is bounded by Limuru Road to the west, Ruaka Road to the south, Kiambu Road to the east, and coffee plantations to the north. The area encompasses Closeburn Estate, Mimosa and Old Runda to the west, Mumwe and Whispers to the south, and New Runda and Muringa to the east. Recent developments have seen the greater Runda area expand and now include such developments as Runda Mhasibu and Runda Paradise to the north. It is separated from Nairobi city centre by the 2,500-acre Karura Forest. The landscape in Runda Estate ranges between 1,690 meters above sea level in low lying areas to 1,727 meters above sea level in elevated areas. The area occupied by Runda Estate (estimated to be 14km2) was once a large coffee estate owned by various firms with 3 coffee processing factories.

Property in Runda ranks among the most exclusive and expensive in the country. According to BuyRentKenya, the price of 1 acre of land averages around Ksh 97 million, while a 4-bedroom townhouse typically costs approximately Ksh 120 million.

== History ==
Runda was developed in 1972 by the project due to demand when the United Nations Environment Programme Headquarters was built in Gigiri in the early 1970s. The first phase of the estate (Old Runda) was completed between 1972 and 1980.
