= Ngong Road =

Road in Kenya

Ngong Road is a major road in Kenya that links the city of Nairobi to Ngong town. It runs from the Nairobi central business district all the way to the Ngong Stadium, passing by major places in Nairobi and Ngong such as the Kenyatta National Hospital, The Junction Mall, the Lang'ata Road roundabout in Karen and the Ngong Market.

Expansion of the road to a four-lane dual carriageway up to Karen Shopping Centre was completed in 2021. The section from Karen Shopping Centre to Ngong Town, which remains a standard carriageway with two traffic lanes continues to experience perennial traffic jams.

== See also ==
- Nairobi Bypasses
- Ngong Forest
