= Afrikansk FC =

Swedish football club

- Full name: Afrikansk Football Club
- Ground: Bårsta IP; Södertälje; Sweden
- League: Division 4 Södermanland
Home colours	Away colours

Afrikansk FC is a Swedish football club located in Södertälje.

== Background ==
Afrikansk FC currently plays in Division4 Södermanland which is the sixth tier of Swedish football league system.
