= Charles Ouma =

South Sudanese footballer (born 1999)

Personal information
- Full name: Silas Charles Ouma
- Date of birth: 2 June 1999 (age 27)
- Place of birth: Taveta, Kenya
- Position: Midfielder

Team information
- Current team: Kenya Police

Youth career
- –2020: AFC Leopards

Senior career*
Years	Team	Apps	(Gls)
2020	Sindo United		
2020–	Kenya Police		

International career^{‡}
2022–	South Sudan	2	(0)
- * Club domestic league appearances and goals ‡ National team caps and goals as of 19 September 2024

Silas Charles Ouma (born 2 June 1999) is a footballer who plays as a midfielder for Kenya Police. Born in Kenya, he plays for the South Sudan national team.

== Career ==
Ouma was born on 2 June 1999 in Kenya. He mainly operates as a midfielder. He can operate as a holding midfielder, as a defensive midfielder, and as an attacking midfielder. He is known for his versatility. As a youth player, he joined the youth academy of AFC Leopards. In 2020, he signed for Sindo United. In 2020, he signed for Kenya Police. He helped the club achieve promotion. He was described as "enjoyed uninterrupted game time in the second tier but struggled to exert himself in the first team when the team was elevated to the top division" while playing for them.

Ouma is a South Sudan international. He was called up to the Kenya national football team for the 2023 Mauritius Four Nations Cup. After that, he played for the South Sudan national football team for 2026 FIFA World Cup qualification and 2025 Africa Cup of Nations qualification. On 26 March 2024, he debuted for the South Sudan national football team during a 0–0 draw with the São Tomé and Príncipe national football team.
