= Ngong, Kenya =

Town in Kajiado County

Ngong (enchoro emuny): ɛnkɔŋʉ́ ɛ́ mʉny; ɔlchɔ́rrɔ ɛ́ mʉny
- Town
- Site of Ngong Hills, North of Nairobi
- Nickname: 111 (pronounced "one one one" or "one eleven")
- Location within Kenya
- Coordinates: 1°22′S 36°38′E
- Country: Kenya
- County: Kajiado County

Government
  - Member of County Assembly (MCA): Mbiriri James Mwaura (United Democratic Alliance)

Area
  - Total: 42.6 km^{2} (16.4 sq mi)
- Highest elevation (Tip of Ngong Hills): 2,460 m (8,070 ft)
- Lowest elevation: 1,961 m (6,434 ft)

Population (2019)
  - Total: 102,323
- Time zone: UTC+3 (EAT)
- Postal code: 00208
- Climate: Cfb

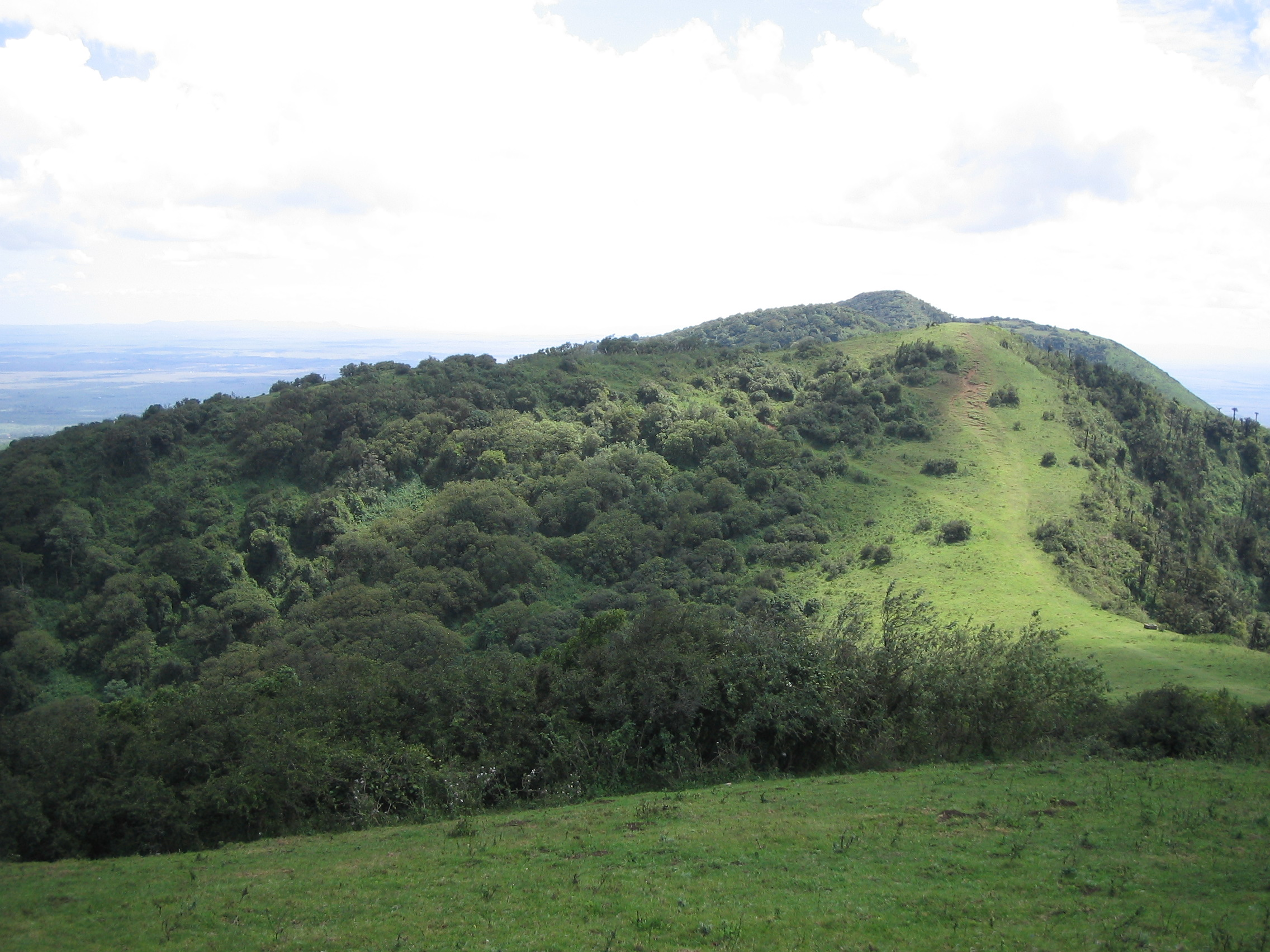
Ngong Hills

Ngong is a town near the Ngong Hills along the Great Rift Valley within Kajiado County, located in the southwest of Nairobi, in southern Kenya.

The word "Ngong" is a Maasai word derived from the word "enkong'u" meaning both "the 'eye'" and "eye of water" or thus spring of water. The original place name is ɛnkɔŋʉ́ ɛ́ mʉny, literally the eye of the rhinoceros but functionally Rhinoceros Spring; an alternative name is ɔlchɔ́rrɔ ɛ́ mʉny (olchorro is a synonym of enkong'u). Ngong is the anglicization of ɛnkɔŋʉ́. Seemingly the British found enkong'u e muñ too difficult to pronounce. A widespread false etymology is linked with the knuckle shape of the hills.

The Ngong Hills, (known to the Maasai as 'Oloolaiser") from the eastside slopes, overlook the Nairobi National Park game reserve and, off to the north, the city of Nairobi. The Ngong Hills, from the westward slopes, overlook the Great Rift Valley dropping over 4,000 feet below, where nomadic Maasai live.

== Demographics ==
As of 2019, the population of Ngong Town consisting of Enchorro-Emunyi and Ngong Township locations was 25,866. The elevation of Ngong Town is 1,961 meters in altitude, but the altitude of the hills is about 2,460 meters above sea level. Ngong was the central town of Ngong division when Kajiado County was a district.

== Transport ==
Ngong has a train station on the Nairobi–Malaba Standard Gauge Railway, which was inaugurated in October 2019.
