= 2014 FKF President's Cup =

GOtv Shield

Tournament details
- Country: Kenya
- Teams: 64

Final positions
- Champions: Sofapaka
- Runners-up: Posta Rangers
- Third place: West Kenya Sugar
- Fourth place: A.F.C. Leopards
- Confederation Cup: Sofapaka

Tournament statistics
- Matches played: 59
- Goals scored: 179 (3.03 per match)
- All statistics correct as of 15 November 2014.

The 2014 FKF President's Cup (known as the GOtv Shield for sponsorship reasons) was the 43rd season of Kenya's top domestic cup competition. It began on 26 April and ended on 15 November, with the domestic broadcasting rights for the competition held by SuperSport. Participating teams were required to pay a registration fee of KSh.30,000/= each to enter the tournament. The competition's defending champions were A.F.C. Leopards, who beat their Nairobi derby rivals Gor Mahia 1–0 in the previous final. Both teams were given byes to the third round, having reached the final the previous year.

Sofapaka, the winners of the competition, received KSh.2 million/= in prize money and represented Kenya in the preliminary round of the 2015 CAF Confederation Cup.

== Teams ==
| Round | Clubs remaining | Clubs involved | Winners from previous round | New entries this round | Leagues/teams entering at this round | Prize money |
|---|---|---|---|---|---|---|
| First round | 64 | 24 | none | 24 | FKF Division One; Provincial League; County Champions League; Sub-County League; Non-league teams | none |
| Second round | 52 | 40 | 9^{[a]} | 31^{[b]} | Premier League; National Super League | none |
| Third round | 32 | 32 | 20 | 12 | A.F.C. Leopards; Gor Mahia; Seeded teams | none |
| Fourth round | 16 | 16 | 16 | none | none | none |
| Quarter-finals | 8 | 8 | 8 | none | none | none |
| Semi-finals | 4 | 4 | 4 | none | none | none |
| Final | 2 | 2 | 2 | none | none | KSh.2 million/= |

Key to numbers in match results
| 1 | Premier League |
| 2 | National Super League |
| 3 | Division One |
| 4 | Provincial League |
| 5 | County Champions League |
| 6 | Sub-County League |
| n | Non-league team |

== First round ==
The draw for the first round was held on 23 April.

The first round ties were played on the weekend of 26–27 April. 24 teams from FKF Division One, the Kenyan Provincial League, the County Champions League and the Sub-County League combined, as well as non-league teams, began their campaigns at this stage.

| 26 April 2014 | Vihiga United (3) | w/o | Butterfly (4) | Bukhungu Stadium, Kakamega |
| 14:00 UTC+3 | | Report |

Vihiga United awarded walkover and advance to the second round.

| 26 April 2014 | Kenyatta National Hospital (4) | 1 – 1 (a.e.t.) (2 – 4 p) | Imara United (n) | Ruaraka Stadium, Nairobi |
| 12:00 UTC+3 | | Report |

| 26 April 2014 | Intercity (4) | 8 – 0 | Homa Bay Talent (4) | Ruaraka Stadium, Nairobi |
| 16:00 UTC+3 | Juma 32'; Iregi 52'; Otieno 55'; Abdi 56', 85', 87'; Ojienda 59' (o.g.); Omondi 60' | Report |

| 26 April 2014 | Fresha (4) | 1 – 0 | Dandora Combined (n) | Limuru Stadium, Limuru |
| 15:00 UTC+3 | | Report |

| 26 April 2014 | Wazito (3) | 6 – 0 | Blitz (3) | Ruaraka Stadium, Nairobi |
| 16:00 UTC+3 | Nanjie 13', 46'; Otieno 16'; Nyagaka 19'; Alubala 23', 41' | Report |

| 26 April 2014 | Museno Sambakhalu (3) | 1 – 2 | Nyakach United (3) | Bukhungu Stadium, Kakamega |
| 12:00 UTC+3 | | Report |

| 27 April 2014 | Strathmore University (3) | 1 – 3 | Palos (3) | Ruaraka Stadium, Nairobi |
| 13:00 UTC+3 | Owiti 7' (pen.) | Report | Wekesa 17'; Billy Odhiambo 30' (pen.); Brian Odhiambo 66'; Omondi (red card) 83' |

| 27 April 2014 | Thome Buffaloes (n) | 0 – 2 | Ulinzi Warriors (3) | Nanyuki Stadium, Nanyuki |
| 15:00 UTC+3 | | Report |

| 27 April 2014 | Commercial (n) | 3 – 4 | Leventis United (n) | Thika Technical Grounds, Thika |
| 15:00 UTC+3 | | Report |

| 27 April 2014 | Vibwanga (3) | 3 – 1 | Magarini (3) | Municipal Stadium, Mombasa |
| 15:00 UTC+3 | | Report |

| 27 April 2014 | Wazee wa Kazi (n) | 1 – 5 | Mumbi Nationale (3) | Ruaraka Stadium, Nairobi |
| 15:00 UTC+3 | Ambani 66' | Report | Oduma 5'; Odhiambo 41'; Mutinda 61'; Mwaniki 88' |

| 27 April 2014 | Transfoc (3) | 3 – 2 | Metumi United (n) | Kenyatta Stadium, Kitale |
| 15:00 UTC+3 | | Report |

== Second round ==
The draw for the second round was held on 22 May 2014 at the Nyayo National Stadium, at 10:30 local time (UTC+3).

3 of the 12 winners from the first round were seeded and given byes to the third round, while 7 of the 38 Premier League and National Super League teams joining in the second round were also seeded and given byes to the third round. The second round ties were played between 30 May and 2 June.

On 23 May, Premier League side Sony Sugar announced that they were pulling out of the tournament due to unresolved issues within the club. Their opponents in the second round, Top Fry AllStars gained automatic qualification to the third round as a result. Former Premier League side Karuturi Sports followed suit 8 days later, also citing unresolved issues, giving their opponents West Kenya Sugar automatic qualification to the third round. Another Premier League side, Thika United, withdrew from the competition on 19 June.

| 31 May 2014 | Posta Rangers (2) | 1 – 0 | Vihiga United (3) | Afraha Stadium, Nakuru |
| 13:45 UTC+3 | Ojwang 52' | Report |

| 31 May 2014 | St. Joseph (2) | 0 – 0 (0 – 3 p) | Kakamega Homeboyz (2) | Afraha Stadium, Nakuru |
| 16:00 UTC+3 | | Report |
| | Penalties |
| | Unidentified (penalty missed); Unidentified (penalty missed); Unidentified (penalty missed) | | (penalty scored) Mathenge; (penalty scored) Kulecho; (penalty scored) Shitote |

| 31 May 2014 | Palos (3) | 1 – 1 (0 – 3 p) | Nakumatt (2) | Bukhungu Stadium, Kakamega |
| 13:00 UTC+3 | Odhiambo 34' | Report | Thairu 90+3' |
| | Penalties |
| | Unidentified (penalty missed); Unidentified (penalty missed); Unidentified (penalty missed) | | (penalty missed) Unidentified; (penalty scored) Unidentified; (penalty scored) Unidentified; (penalty scored) Unidentified |

| 31 May 2014 | Fresha (4) | 0 – 1 | MOYAS (2) | Unidentified |
| 15:00 UTC+3 | | Report |

| 31 May 2014 | Ligi Ndogo (2) | 1 – 1 (5 – 4 p) | Kenya Commercial Bank (1) | Hope Centre, Nairobi |
| 15:00 UTC+3 | Yida 51' | Report | Warambo 70' |
| | Penalties |
| | Ugochukwu (penalty scored); Omari (penalty scored); Yator (penalty scored); Njuku (penalty missed); Dundi (penalty scored); Ouma (penalty missed); Lubulu (penalty scored) | | (penalty scored) Kiongera; (penalty scored) Odhiambo; (penalty scored) Oyando; (penalty scored) Chaka; (penalty missed) Onyango; (penalty missed) Omondi; (penalty missed) Warambo |

| 31 May 2014 | Kenya Revenue Authority (1) | 1 – 1 (5 – 6 p) | G.F.C. 105 (2) | Unidentified |
| 15:00 UTC+3 | | Report |

| 31 May 2014 | Rift Valley United (2) | 2 – 1 | Transfoc (3) | Unidentified |
| 15:00 UTC+3 | Omondi 5', 70' | Report | Unidentified |

| 31 May 2014 | Chemelil Sugar (1) | w/o | Thika United (1) |
| 15:00 UTC+3 | | Report |

Thika United withdrew from the tournament. Chemelil Sugar advance to the third round.

| 31 May 2014 | Leventis United (n) | 0 – 2 | Agrochemical (2) | Hope Centre, Nairobi |
| 15:00 UTC+3 | | Report | Oganda 4'; Oketch 60' |

| 31 May 2014 | Busia United Stars (2) | 0 – 2 | Bandari (1) | Bukhungu Stadium, Kakamega |
| 15:00 UTC+3 | | Report | Mohammed 42'; Okoth 45' |

| 31 May 2014 | West Kenya Sugar (2) | w/o | Karuturi Sports (2) |
| 15:00 UTC+3 | | Report |

Karuturi Sports withdrew from the tournament. West Kenya Sugar advance to the third round.

| 1 June 2014 | Imara United (n) | 1 – 0 | Oserian (2) | Unidentified |
| 13:00 UTC+3 | | Report |

| 1 June 2014 | FC Talanta (2) | 2 – 0 | Mahakama (2) | Ruaraka Stadium, Nairobi |
| 13:45 UTC+3 | Otieno 17', 32' | Report |

| 1 June 2014 | Vibwanga (3) | 0 – 8 | Sofapaka (1) | Mbaraki Stadium, Mombasa |
| 13:45 UTC+3 | | Report | Kasolo 15'; Muki 19'; Kago 22', 40'; Agwanda 50'; Ndolo 56'; Wembe 76' (o.g.); Shivachi 82' |

| 1 June 2014 | Sony Sugar (1) | w/o | Top Fry AllStars (1) |
| 15:00 UTC+3 | | Report |

Sony Sugar withdrew from the tournament. Top Fry AllStars advance to the third round.

| 1 June 2014 | Nyakach United (3) | 4 – 2 | Kariobangi Sharks (2) | Unidentified |
| 15:00 UTC+3 | | Report |

| 1 June 2014 | Mumbi Nationale (3) | 2 – 0 | Nzoia United (2) | Unidentified |
| 15:00 UTC+3 | | Report |

| 1 June 2014 | Tusker (1) | 3 – 2 | Western Stima (1) | Ruaraka Stadium, Nairobi |
| 16:00 UTC+3 | I. Salim 7'; Were 72'; Abondo 89' | Report | Batambuze 63'; Owuor 66' |

| 2 June 2014 | Nairobi City Stars (1) | 4 – 0 | Modern Coast Rangers (2) | Ruaraka Stadium, Nairobi |
| 13:45 UTC+3 | Oliech 1'; Basweti 13'; Ochieng 37', 45' | Report |

| 2 June 2014 | Mathare United (1) | 1 – 0 | Bidco United (2) | Ruaraka Stadium, Nairobi |
| 16:00 UTC+3 | Ochieng 90' | Report |

== Bracket ==
Third round
A.F.C. Leopards | 3
Mathare United | 2
Ligi Ndogo | 3
Zoo Kericho | 0
Mumbi Nationale | 0
Ulinzi Stars | 6
Nakumatt | 2
Tusker | 6
Top Fry AllStars | 0
Intercity | 2
FC Talanta | 1
Administration Police | 2
Nyakach United | 1
Muhoroni Youth | 3
Sofapaka | 6
Rift Valley United | 0
Gor Mahia | 1 (2)
G.F.C. 105 | 1 (4)
Bandari (w/o) | 2
Finlays Horticulture | 0
Posta Rangers | 4
Ulinzi Warriors | 0
Chemelil Sugar | 1
MOYAS | 0
Kakamega Homeboyz | 1 (0)
Shabana | 1 (3)
Agrochemical | 1
Nairobi Stima | 0
Nairobi City Stars | 1
Wazito | 2
West Kenya Sugar | 2
Imara United | 0

Fourth round
A.F.C. Leopards | 2
Ligi Ndogo | 0
Ulinzi Stars | 1 (3)
Tusker | 1 (5)
Intercity | 0 (5)
Administration Police | 0 (6)
Muhoroni Youth | 1
Sofapaka | 2
G.F.C. 105 | 0
Bandari | 2
Posta Rangers | 2
Chemelil Sugar | 0
Shabana | 1
Agrochemical | 3
Wazito | 1 (4)
West Kenya Sugar | 1 (5)

Quarter-finals
A.F.C. Leopards | 3
Tusker | 2
Administration Police | 1
Sofapaka | 3
Bandari | 0
Posta Rangers | 1
Agrochemical | 0
West Kenya Sugar | 1

Semi-finals
A.F.C. Leopards | 0
Sofapaka | 2
Posta Rangers | 0 (10)
West Kenya Sugar | 0 (9)

Final
Sofapaka | 2
Posta Rangers | 1

== Third round ==
The draw for the third round was also held on 22 May 2014 at the Nyayo National Stadium, at 10:30 local time (UTC+3). Along with the 20 winners from the second round and 2013 finalists A.F.C. Leopards and Gor Mahia, 10 seeded teams will begin their campaigns at this stage. The third round ties are to be played from 18–20 July and 23 August.

Intercity, one of the seeded teams, was the only remaining Provincial League team in the tournament. Two more of the seeded teams, Ulinzi Warriors and Wazito, along with Mumbi Nationale and Nyakach United, were the only remaining FKF Division One teams competing for the title.

National Super League side Finlays Horticulture became the fourth team to give a walkover in the tournament, but the first to do so after failing to turn up for their match. Explaining why they could not face Bandari in their third round clash, head coach Sammy Okoth said that the team had lost eight players during the mid-season (June–July) transfer window, and as such the squad was depleted and not yet ready to take on such an intense match.

| 18 July 2014 | West Kenya Sugar (2) | 2 – 0 | Imara United (n) | Bukhungu Stadium, Kakamega |
| 13:45 UTC+3 | Simwa 2', 14' | Report |

| 18 July 2014 | Kakamega Homeboyz (2) | 1 – 1 (0 – 3 p) | Shabana (2) | Bukhungu Stadium, Kakamega |
| 16:00 UTC+3 | Ogutu 30' | Report | Makori 26' |
| | Penalties |
| | Mathenge (penalty missed); Kulecho (penalty missed); Katekera (penalty missed) | | (penalty scored) Mukaisi; (penalty scored) Juma; (penalty scored) Sande |

| 19 July 2014 | Mumbi Nationale (3) | 0 – 6 | Ulinzi Stars (1) | Ruaraka Stadium, Nairobi |
| 13:00 UTC+3 | | Report | Waruru 2', 41'; Saruni 17' (pen.), 90' (pen.); Amuoka 26', 36' |

| 19 July 2014 | Agrochemical (2) | 1 – 0 | Nairobi Stima (2) | Moi Stadium, Kisumu |
| 13:00 UTC+3 | Musyoka 4' | Report | Odhiambo (yellow card) 43' |

| 19 July 2014 | Top Fry AllStars (1) | 0 – 2 | Intercity (4) | Afraha Stadium, Nakuru |
| 15:00 UTC+3 | | Report | Lutta 20'; Liambo 89' |

| 19 July 2014 | Nairobi City Stars (1) | 1 – 2 | Wazito (3) | Ruaraka Stadium, Nairobi |
| 15:00 UTC+3 | Majani (yellow card) 81'; Oliech 88' | Report | Ikatwa (yellow card) 30'; Ndege 80' (pen.), 86'; Omollo (yellow card) 89' |

| 19 July 2014 | Gor Mahia (1) | 1 – 1 (2 – 4 p) | G.F.C. 105 (2) | Moi Stadium, Kisumu |
| 15:00 UTC+3 | Mburu 82' | Report | Shiveka 89' |
| | Penalties |
| | Shakava (penalty scored); E. Ochieng (penalty scored); Mburu (penalty missed); Mohammed (penalty missed) | | (penalty scored) Kiptoo; (penalty scored) H. Ochieng; (penalty scored) Shiveka; (penalty scored) Abuya |

| 20 July 2014 | Ligi Ndogo (2) | 3 – 0 | Zoo Kericho (2) | Ruaraka Stadium, Nairobi |
| 11:00 UTC+3 | Yida 18'; Sindani 26' (o.g.); Rersa (yellow card) 32'; Simiyu 90' | Report | Ayieko (yellow card) 45'; Kipkirui (yellow card) 52'; Sindani (yellow card) 70' (yellow-red card) 90' |

| 20 July 2014 | Posta Rangers (2) | 4 – 0 | Ulinzi Warriors (3) | Ruaraka Stadium, Nairobi |
| 13:00 UTC+3 | Radiki 10', 44', 70'; Mukwana 40' | Report | Asanga (yellow card) 75' |

| 20 July 2014 | Chemelil Sugar (1) | 1 – 0 | MOYAS (2) | Unidentified |
| 13:45 UTC+3 | Karani 48' | Report |

| 20 July 2014 | FC Talanta (2) | 1 – 2 | Administration Police (2) | Oserian Grounds, Naivasha |
| TBD UTC+3 | Okul 22' | Report | Alemba 4'; Michoma 46'; Otieno (yellow card) 54'; Ochieng (yellow card) 62' |

| 20 July 2014 | Bandari (1) | w/o | Finlays Horticulture (2) |
| 15:00 UTC+3 | | Report |

Finlays Horticulture failed to show up for the match. Bandari advance to the fourth round.

| 20 July 2014 | Sofapaka (1) | 6 – 0 | Rift Valley United (2) | Ruaraka Stadium, Nairobi |
| 15:00 UTC+3 | Batambuze 10'; Ndolo 22', 43'; Baraza 25', 71'; Agwanda 54' | Report |

| 20 July 2014 | Nyakach United (3) | 1 – 3 | Muhoroni Youth (1) | Unidentified |
| 15:00 UTC+3 | Unidentified | Report | Ochieng 20'; Wanjala 35'; Otieno 80' |

| 20 July 2014 | Nakumatt (2) | 2 – 6 | Tusker (1) | Oserian Grounds, Naivasha |
| 16:00 UTC+3 | Onyango 46'; Nzuki 72' | Report | Were 18', 54'; Salim 46', 65'; Abondo 50'; Kimani 85' |

| 23 August 2014 | A.F.C. Leopards (1) | 3 – 2 | Mathare United (1) | Nyayo National Stadium, Nairobi |
| TBD UTC+3 | Wafula 4', 9'; Okwemba 86' | Report | Situma 30' (o.g.); Ombasa 73' |

== Fourth round ==
The fourth round ties were played from 30 August to 7 September.

Intercity remained the only Provincial League side competing for the title, while of the four FKF Division One teams remaining in the third round, only Wazito advanced to the fourth round. Seven of the initial 24 National Super League entrants and seven of the initial 16 Premier League teams also competed in the fourth round.

| 30 August 2014 | Intercity (4) | 0 – 0 (5 – 6 p) | Administration Police (2) | Ruaraka Stadium, Nairobi |
| 13:00 UTC+3 | | Report |
| | Penalties |
| | Iregi (penalty scored); Maina (penalty scored); Muiyuro (penalty missed); Ochieng (penalty scored); C. Otieno (penalty scored); Ogechi (penalty scored); Ballack (penalty missed) | | (penalty scored) Muteti; (penalty scored) Odhiambo; (penalty missed) A. Otieno; (penalty scored) Ng'ang'a; (penalty scored) Jagero; (penalty scored) Unidentified; (penalty scored) Madede |

| 30 August 2014 | Posta Rangers (2) | 2 – 0 | Chemelil Sugar (1) | Ruaraka Stadium, Nairobi |
| 15:00 UTC+3 | Kisuya 31'; Ojwang 48' | Report |

| 30 August 2014 | G.F.C. 105 (2) | 0 – 2 | Bandari (1) | Kipchoge Keino Stadium, Eldoret |
| 15:00 UTC+3 | | Report | Mangi 35'; Okello 45' |

| 31 August 2014 | Wazito (3) | 1 – 1 (4 – 5 p) | West Kenya Sugar (2) | Ruaraka Stadium, Nairobi |
| 15:00 UTC+3 | D. Onyango 75' | Match report News report | A. Onyango 40' |
| | Penalties |
| | Dure (penalty scored); Ndege (penalty scored); Odhiambo (penalty missed); Otieno (penalty scored); Onsando (penalty scored); Alubala (penalty missed) | | (penalty missed) Bengo; (penalty scored) Ambulwa; (penalty scored) Orenge; (penalty scored) Simiyu; (penalty scored) Onchiri; (penalty scored) Omenga |

| 31 August 2014 | Shabana (2) | 1 – 3 | Agrochemical (2) | Afraha Stadium, Nakuru |
| 15:00 UTC+3 | Oluoch 15' | Report | Unidentified ((?)); Unidentified ((?)); Unidentified ((?)) |

| 7 September 2014 | Muhoroni Youth (1) | 1 – 2 | Sofapaka (1) | Muhoroni Stadium, Muhoroni |
| 13:15 UTC+3 | Otieno 86' | Report | Baraza 48', 67' |

| 7 September 2014 | Ulinzi Stars (1) | 1 – 1 (3 – 5 p) | Tusker (1) | Afraha Stadium, Nakuru |
| 15:00 UTC+3 | Waruru 10' | Match report News report | Were 87' |
| | Penalties |
| | Apul (penalty scored); Ndeto (penalty scored); Waruru (penalty missed); Ruto (penalty scored) | | (penalty scored) Dunga; (penalty scored) Osumba; (penalty scored) Atudo; (penalty scored) Odhiambo; (penalty scored) Monday |

| 7 September 2014 | A.F.C. Leopards (1) | 2 – 0 | Ligi Ndogo (2) | City Stadium, Nairobi |
| 15:00 UTC+3 | Keli (red card) 44'; Mudde 55', 70' | Report |

== Quarter-finals ==
The quarter-final ties were played on the weekend of 27–28 September. Four teams from both the Premier League and the National Super League competed in this stage of the competition.

| 27 September 2014 | Agrochemical (2) | 0 – 1 | West Kenya Sugar (2) | City Stadium, Nairobi |
| 12:00 UTC+3 | Bitolwa (yellow card) 22' | Report | Simwa 2'; Ajika (yellow card) 75' |

| 27 September 2014 | Bandari (1) | 0 – 1 | Posta Rangers (2) | City Stadium, Nairobi |
| 14:00 UTC+3 | | Report | Nyaga 40' |

| 28 September 2014 | Administration Police (2) | 1 – 3 | Sofapaka (1) | City Stadium, Nairobi |
| 12:00 UTC+3 | Karanja (yellow card) 48'; Alemba (red card) 63'; Jagero 80' | Report | Baraza 15', 39' (yellow card) 53'; Shivachi 64' |

| 28 September 2014 | A.F.C. Leopards (1) | 3 – 2 | Tusker (1) | City Stadium, Nairobi |
| 14:30 UTC+3 | Uzomereke 63' (pen.); Wahome 83' (o.g.); Mieno 84' | Report | Were 4', 37' |

== Semi-finals ==
The semi-final matches were played on 20 October. Two teams from both the Premier League and the National Super League competed at this stage of the competition.

=== A.F.C. Leopards vs Sofapaka abandonment ===
The match between A.F.C. Leopards and Sofapaka was abandoned in the 87th minute, moments after the latter's second goal through Ekaliana Ndolo, after fans stormed the pitch in protest of the officiating. Security personnel present at the Nairobi City Stadium where the match was taking place were forced to launch tear gas canisters onto the angry mob, while one linesman left with his head badly injured. An ambulance and a SuperSport van were also damaged after being stoned by the fans.

Before the match's abandonment, other incidents of crowd trouble arose from the Ingwe fans. Spectators began throwing bottles and stones deep into the first half, after Austin Ikenna was flagged offside just four minutes before Enock Agwanda's opening goal in the 26th minute, forcing a stoppage of about three minutes to restore calm in the stadium.

The following day, the Football Kenya Federation fined A.F.C. Leopards a sum of Ksh.500,000/= (approx. US$5,590 or £3,500 stg.), ordered the club to pay the medical expenses for the injured fans and match officials, as well as play its remaining matches for the season behind closed doors. West Kenya Sugar, the loser of the other semi-final of the day, were also handed an automatic third-place playoff win as part of the sanctions.

=== Match results ===
| 20 October 2014 | Posta Rangers (2) | 0 – 0 (10 – 9 p) | West Kenya Sugar (2) | City Stadium, Nairobi |
| 13:00 UTC+3 | Karega (yellow card) 40' | Report | Nyaga (yellow card) 90' |
| | Penalties |
| | P. Ochieng (penalty scored); Mukaisi (penalty scored); Mbugi (penalty scored); Mwachi (penalty missed); I. Otieno (penalty scored); Nyamao (penalty scored); A. Ochieng (penalty scored); C. Ochieng (penalty missed); M. Otieno (penalty scored); Nyaga (penalty scored); Opere (penalty scored); I. Otieno (penalty scored) | | (penalty missed) Ajika; (penalty scored) Agurwa; (penalty scored) Onyango; (penalty scored) Omengo; (penalty scored) Wafula; (penalty scored) Amboso; (penalty scored) Onchiri; (penalty missed) Bengo; (penalty scored) Karega; (penalty scored) Sitati; (penalty scored) Emase; (penalty missed) Bengo |

| 20 October 2014 | A.F.C. Leopards (1) | 0 – 2 | Sofapaka (1) | City Stadium, Nairobi |
| 15:30 UTC+3 | Shikokoti (yellow card) 70' | Report | Agwanda 26'; Miheso (yellow card) 62'; Ndolo 86' |

== Final ==
The final was played on 15 November at the Afraha Stadium in Nakuru.

Posta Rangers became the first second-tier side to play in a Kenyan domestic cup final since their semi-final opponents West Kenya Sugar in 2010, when they also met (and lost to) Sofapaka in the final.

| 15 November 2014 | Sofapaka (1) | 2 – 1 | Posta Rangers (2) | Afraha Stadium, Nakuru |
| 14:00 UTC+3 | Agwanda 51' (yellow card) 69'; Bagoole (yellow card) 67'; Miheso 90' | Report | Mukwana (yellow card) 44'; Ochieng 57' |

== See also ==
- 2014 Kenyan Premier League

== Notes ==
- a. Of the 12 winners from the first round, Intercity, Ulinzi Warriors and Wazito were seeded and given byes to the third round.
- b. Of the 24 National Super League joining in the second round, Administration Police, Finlays Horticulture, Nairobi Stima, Shabana and Zoo Kericho were seeded and given byes to the third round, while Ulinzi Stars and Muhoroni Youth were seeded from the 14 Kenyan Premier League teams joining in the second round.
