= Purity Ngina =

Kenyan academic

Dr. Purity Ngina
- Born: Nyeri County
- Occupation: Academician
- Known for: being the youngest P.H.D holders in Kenya
- Title: Dr.
- Spouse: Germano Richter Mugambi
- Children: Richter Mugambi; Giannis Mugambi
- Parent: Lydia Ngina

Academic background
- Education: Strathmore University, Doctor of Philosophy in Biomathematics, Bioinformatics, and Computational Biology; Egerton University, Master's degree in Applied Mathematics; Egerton University, Bachelor's degree in Mathematics and Chemistry
- Thesis: Mathematical Modelling of In Vivo HIV Optimal Therapy Management (2018)

Academic work
- Discipline: Mathematician
- Institutions: Strathmore University

Purity Ngina is a Kenyan academician and the CEO of the National Gender and Equality Commission. She previously worked at Zizi Afrique Foundation and was a lecturer at Strathmore University in Nairobi from 2016 to 2020. At age 28, she became Kenya's youngest PhD graduate in biomathematics.

== Early life ==
Purity Ngina was born in Nyeri County, a rural area of Kenya, in 1990. She and her older brother were raised by a single mother. Ngina sat for the Kenya Certificate of Primary Education twice in 2002 and 2003 before proceeding to secondary school and graduating in 2007.

== Education and career ==
In 2009, she was admitted to Egerton University, where she graduated with first class honors in 2013 with undergraduate degrees in education science and mathematics. In 2015 she graduated with a master's degree in applied mathematics from the same university.

Ngina joined Strathmore University as an assistant lecturer in 2016 teaching finance, economics, and actuarial science students. She received funding for a PhD from The German Academic Exchange Service. In 2018, age 28, she became Kenya's youngest PhD holder in biomathematics. Her thesis focused on the mathematics of HIV.

She is married to Germano Mugambi, a university lecturer at Egerton University.
