= 2015–16 in Kenyan football =

2015–16 in Kenyan football may refer to:

- 2015 in Kenyan football
- 2016 in Kenyan football
