= 2015 in Kenyan football =

Football in Kenya
- Season: 2015

Men's football
- Kenyan Premier League: Gor Mahia
- FKF Premier League: Posta Rangers
- President's Cup: Bandari
- Top 8 Cup: Gor Mahia
- Super Cup: Gor Mahia

The following article is a summary of the 2015 football season in Kenya, which is the 52nd competitive season in its history.

The beginning of the season was hampered by the failure of the Football Kenya Federation (FKF) and the Kenyan Premier League (KPL) to reach an agreement over the running of the top division in Kenyan football. Following a proposal from the FKF to expand the league to 18 teams, it formed a parallel FKF Premier League after talks with the KPL fell through over the running and composition of the Kenyan top flight for the 2015 season. Existing KPL clubs refused to take part in the FKF Premier League and instead pledged to remain in the KPL.

== Kenyan Premier League crisis ==
=== League expansion proposal and stalemate in talks ===
Towards the end of the 2014 season, the FKF proposed that the Premier League should be expanded to 18 teams from 16 for the upcoming season, though KPL management insisted that the 2015 season would continue with 16 teams. This followed previous concern shown by the KPL Executive Committee over the way FKF had interfered with decisions made regarding Premier League teams over the last 2 years. Reasons given by the KPL for the opposition of the expansion of the league included the national team needing more time for friendlies and competitive matches to increase the nation's FIFA World Ranking, as well as an increased risk of injury to Premier League players – especially since only very few clubs have medical insurance to cover costs of the rehabilitation of players – further undermining the performance of the national team. However, in a statement released on 25 November 2014, the FKF insisted that the decision to expand the league was "final and irreversible".

On 4 December 2014, Hassan Wario, the Cabinet Secretary for Sports, Culture and the Arts, voiced his support for the retention of a 16-team Premier League, quoted saying: "The KPL is here to stay. FKF should put its house in order." In response, the FKF criticised the Cabinet Secretary in a statement released the next day for showing "open biasness yet he is supposed to be neutral and play the role of an arbitrator whenever any dispute is brought to his office." On 14 December, Governor of Nairobi Evans Kidero stated that the FKF's decision to expand the league "should be supported by everyone", stating that the target should be to have all 47 counties represented in the top tier to "boost competitiveness".

On 19 December 2014, the KPL suspended FKF chairman Sam Nyamweya from participating in its Governing Council meetings until the governing body "respects and implements Article 32 of the FKF Constitution", adding that the body has "shown no respect to judicial bodies mandated to make major decisions on disputes." The same day, however, a meeting held by representatives from both sides led to the formation of a task force to deliberate on the composition of the league for the upcoming season and present a report to the FKF/KPL Joint Executive Committee on 21 January 2015. Still on the same day, a statement signed by Nyamweya and KPL chairman Ambrose Rachier revealed the formation of a six-man committee with three representatives from each side to hold talks with three FIFA delegates to come up with resolutions on the crisis.

On 15 January 2015, Nyamweya announced that the 2015 Kenyan Premier League season was set to kick off on the second week of February, adding that the FKF was "working hard to ensure all matters are settled as soon as possible". However, Cabinet Secretary Wario launched an attack on the FKF the next day and threatened their disbandment. Speaking at the 2014 Kenyan Sports Personality of the Year awards, Wario noted that Kenya "has never been short of talents but we have been very short of managers of those talents and those are the people letting down Kenya and the youths of this country."

On 27 January 2015, the FKF ejected a consultant report sent in by FIFA delegate Robert Niemann, with its National Executive Committee (NEC) stating that he "ventured in areas and scope beyond his mandate", after FIFA had directed that the report be released to all concerned parties in the crisis, including the KPL.

=== Creation of parallel top-flight leagues ===
Following a KPL Governing Council meeting held on 24 January 2015, the KPL announced four days later that the league was set to begin on 21 February with 16 teams, with fixtures to be reviewed and approved at a meeting to be held in early February. Committee members expressed hope that an agreement with the FKF would be finalised and signed before the league's kick-off, but authorised matches to be played with or without a signed agreement with the FKF.

However, in response, the FKF announced the creation of the FKF Premier League (FKF PL) consisting of 18 teams just hours later, adding that the governing body had already secured a sponsor for the 2015 season and following seasons, guaranteeing each participating club KSh.9 million/= (approx. £63,286 sterling, €86,541 or US$98,523) in annual grants. Its kick-off date was set for 14 February. Following the FKF's announcement, top referees in Kenya showed their support for the KPL, with one referee reported saying that officials at the 2014 FKF President's Cup "have not been paid yet the sponsor released the money to cater for that. So if the Federation cannot be honest with such a small tournament, how can they be trusted to run the league?"

Following action taken by the two bodies, Cabinet Secretary Wario summoned representatives from both sides for an "urgent meeting" on 29 January, although KPL Chief Executive Officer Jack Oguda stated that the KPL was still waiting for official communication from Wario before honouring the reported summon. On 30 January, Wario ordered the FKF to release the previously ejected FIFA report to all concerned parties including the Ministry of Sports, Culture and the Arts "without any further delay". In response, the FKF insisted that the report was not meant for "any other parties" other than itself and the Kenyan Premier League. In a Special General Meeting convened by the FKF the same day, the governing body resolved to maintain its previous directive to stage the eighteen-team FKF Premier League, with resolutions including the adjustment of the top flight's timeline from February–November to August–May starting from the 2016–17 season.

=== Defiance from KPL and member clubs ===
At a KPL Governing Council meeting held on 2 February 2015, the KPL declared it would "ignore any FKF decisions and threats which violate the previous FIFA and FKF-KPL cooperation agreements and arrangements over the last decade, adding that it would "refocus KPL's limited resources on continuing to make the KPL one of the most corruption-free, professionally managed, highly competitive and widely admired leagues in Africa" instead of "wasting any more time and energy on unproductive wrangles". In the FIFA report that was finally sent to KPL chairman Ambrose Rachier, it was revealed that FIFA had recommended that the KPL continue to be competed by 16 teams for the 2015 season and that the KPL remain the official body to run the Kenyan top flight on behalf of the FKF. The report also revealed that FKF chairman Sam Nyamweya influenced the promotion of Shabana from the National Super League to the Premier League, a move that was previously questioned by the KPL Governing Council in December 2014.

Following reports published by the KPL exposing major integrity issues at the FKF, the FKF National Executive Committee demanded an "unreserved apology" from the KPL on 9 February 2015, threatening to sue if none was issued within three days. The FKF later fined Gor Mahia and Sofapaka a total of KSh.200,000/= each for participating in the unsanctioned 2015 Kenyan Super Cup match, adding that the teams would face further disciplinary action if they continued to defy them, while the match officials were all also handed three-month bans for participating in the match.

On 13 February, Sofapaka president Elly Kalekwa announced that neither his club nor any other KPL club would honour the FKF Premier League and pledged to remain a part of the KPL. The FKF later kicked out all KPL clubs from the FKF Premier League and drew member clubs from the National Super League, with its first match ending in a 1–0 victory for Shabana over Nakumatt. Having been given until 18 February by Cabinet Secretary Wario to reach an agreement over the running and composition of Kenya's top flight, talks between the KPL and the FKF collapsed once more, with KPL chairman Rachier stating that the KPL walked out on the meeting because the FKF showed up with 30 representatives to outnumber them and win a vote that was to be taken on the issue.

On 24 February, a court order acquired by the FKF forced the second round of the 2015 Kenyan Premier League to be put on hold. Matches were halted "until further notice", with the KPL presenting documents challenging the ruling. The case was set to be heard on 3 March, but was postponed to and heard on 5 March.

=== Suspension and reinstatement of the KPL ===
After failing to reach an agreement once more, the FKF and the KPL headed to court on 5 March, where a ruling delivered by Lady Justice Roselyn Aburili extended an injunction imposed on the KPL, forcing the league to be put on hold until further notice. The next day, FKF officials Sammy Sholei and Dan Shikanda, who were previously suspended in 2012, were enjoined with the KPL in the case against the FKF, with Sholei saying that while he and Shikanda do not know what happens in the running of the KPL, the FKF "have integrity issues all over. If we were to choose the lesser devil here, then it will be the KPL any day."

On 11 March, A.F.C. Leopards captain Martin Imbalambala and striker Noah Wafula were suspended by their club for reportedly accepting bribes from self-proclaimed club chairman Matthew Opwora, who was previously reported to have paid out former team manager Willis Waliaula and bribed each player with KSh.17,000/= to take part in an FKF Premier League match against West Kenya Sugar. The club was later replaced by Nzoia United in the league, and while actual club chairman Allan Kasavuli maintained the club's allegiance to the KPL, Opwora moved to regain the club's place in the FKF Premier League.

After a ruling was delayed by 2 hours in a 13 March hearing, contempt of court charges against KPL management for kicking off the league on 21 February without authorisation from the FKF were thrown out, with Lady Justice Aburili stating that the order was not served within the court's working hours and also ruled that the FKF had "ill motives", having not attempted to serve the order during KPL matches and failing to enjoin Sports Kenya and the KEFORA (Kenya Football Referees Association) in their case against the KPL. The following Monday, on 16 March, the High Court of Kenya lifted the injunction imposed on the KPL on 24 February, allowing the league to resume with the second round. Lady Justice Aburili, who presided over the case, ruled that the FKF could not sue or be sued under its own name unless its officials began legal proceedings on its behalf, and advised that the name "Football Kenya Federation" be removed from the list of defendants and replaced with "Football Kenya Federation officials", and that a solution to the crisis be agreed on between the two parties out of court.

=== End of negotiations ===
After KPL CEO Jack Oguda agreed that the impasse with the FKF could be solved out of court, speaking to the KPL's official website on 17 March, the FKF released a statement the following day, stating that it was "satisfied that the case is still on course and the substance thereon was not dismissed by the Court," with their representatives studying the ruling with an aim of taking another course of action to continue the court case.

On 23 March, a FIFA delegation assigned to the case, led by Ghana Football Association president Kwesi Nyantakyi, announced its support for the 16-team Kenyan Premier League but suggested that the league be contested by 18 teams from 2016 onwards. An agreement was finalised between FKF and KPL representatives the same day. The two parties agreed on a number of issues, including the official recognition of the KPL as the top tier and the FKF PL as the second tier of the Kenyan football league system for 2015 and the allocation of all commercial rights for the top division beginning 2016, as well as a memorandum of understanding outlining the promotion and relegation system between the two leagues for 2015 and the relationship between the two parties regarding the government of the top tier beginning 2016.

=== Teams ===
==== Kenyan Premier League ====
- A.F.C. Leopards
- Bandari
- Chemelil Sugar
- Gor Mahia
- Kenya Commercial Bank
- Mathare United
- Muhoroni Youth
- Nairobi City Stars
- Sony Sugar
- Sofapaka
- Thika United
- Top Fry AllStars
- Tusker
- Ulinzi Stars
- Ushuru
- Western Stima

==== FKF Premier League ====
- Agrochemical
- Bidco United
- Finlays Horticulture
- Kakamega Homeboyz
- Kariobangi Sharks
- Ligi Ndogo
- Modern Coast Rangers
- MOSCA
- Nairobi Stima
- Nakumatt
- Nzoia United
- Oserian
- Posta Rangers
- Shabana
- St. Joseph
- FC Talanta
- West Kenya Sugar
- Zoo Kericho

== FKF corruption allegations ==
If you don't have proof, you don't just write. Those days are over. These days if you do things that are illegal, my friend; you shall be taken to the sweepers. You do what you think is right. Don't say so and so has robbed when it is not true.

— FKF president Sam Nyamweya reacting to corruption allegations made against him by French football executive Jérôme J. Dufourg.

On 25 May 2015, in the midst of the FIFA corruption scandal, German broadcaster Deutsche Welle aired a documentary featuring French football executive Jérôme J. Dufourg that accused FKF president Sam Nyamweya of embezzling more than US$500,000 in development aid funds from FIFA, grants from the Confederation of African Football and other forms of funding from the Kenyan government. Showing bank statements from the FKF, Dufourg stated, "It is plain to see that almost US$200,000 in development funds came from FIFA. But the amount doesn't show up in the [Kenyan football] association annual report. Instead, withdrawals adding up to US$500,000 always came after deposits; that is clear evidence of corruption." Nyamweya was previously named in a report by the Ethics and Anti-Corruption Commission, released in late March and dubbed the "List of Shame" by Kenyan media, among 174 others being investigated for corruption in Kenya.

Soon after the documentary was aired, the allegations made by Dufourg were widely reported on the Kenyan press, while the FKF's media rights holders MP & Silva reportedly suspended all payments to and cut ties with the federation over "repeated breaches of confidentiality" and their dissatisfaction with the quality of the FKF Premier League. FKF National Executive Committee member Tom Alila called for the resignation of Nyamweya and his deputy Robert Asembo in the wake of the scandal, saying the activities of the two "have compromised the image of Kenya football in the region, continent and the world." The following week, Alila declared his candidacy for the FKF presidency ahead of elections expected to be held on 3 November. Two days prior to Alila's announcement, Kariobangi Sharks founder and chairman Nick Mwendwa declared his candidacy with the slogan "Game ni mimi, game ni wewe" ("The game is me, the game is you"), highlighting the apparent mismanagement of the sport in the country under Nyamweya's leadership.

In response to the allegations made against him by Dufourg, Nyamweya stated, "I cannot discuss about it because it is being handled by our legal experts and its recklessness. We want media houses not to be reckless, if you are given any documentation, you must have proof. If you don't have proof, you don't just write. Those days are over, these days if you do things that are illegal, my friend; you shall be taken to the sweepers. You do what you think is right. Don't say so and so has robbed when it is not true."

In October, allegations of corruption within the FKF resurfaced ahead of the federation's elections in November. Former National Executive Committee (NEC) member Hussein Terry accused the federation of planning to rig the elections to keep Nyamweya as the FKF president.

== Domestic leagues ==
=== Kenyan Premier League ===
The 2015 Kenyan Premier League season began on 21 February and is scheduled to end on 7 November.

| Pos | Team | Pld | W | D | L | GF | GA | GD | Pts | Qualification or relegation |
|---|---|---|---|---|---|---|---|---|---|---|
| 1 | Gor Mahia (C, Q) | 30 | 24 | 6 | 0 | 60 | 12 | +48 | 78 | Qualification for 2016 CAF Champions League (Note: The winners of the 2015 FKF President's Cup will qualify for the 2016 CAF Confederation Cup.) |
| 2 | Ulinzi Stars | 30 | 17 | 7 | 6 | 41 | 25 | +16 | 58 | |
| 3 | Sofapaka | 30 | 12 | 11 | 7 | 39 | 39 | 0 | 47 | |
| 4 | Bandari | 30 | 12 | 10 | 8 | 32 | 25 | +7 | 46 | |
| 5 | Tusker | 30 | 12 | 8 | 10 | 46 | 28 | +18 | 44 | |
| 6 | Muhoroni Youth | 30 | 11 | 11 | 8 | 31 | 36 | −5 | 44 | |
| 7 | A.F.C. Leopards | 30 | 11 | 8 | 11 | 33 | 30 | +3 | 41 | |
| 8 | Ushuru | 30 | 9 | 10 | 11 | 22 | 28 | −6 | 37 | |
| 9 | Mathare United | 30 | 7 | 15 | 8 | 35 | 34 | +1 | 36 | |
| 10 | SoNy Sugar | 30 | 9 | 8 | 13 | 23 | 26 | −3 | 35 | |
| 11 | Western Stima | 30 | 9 | 8 | 13 | 25 | 31 | −6 | 35 | |
| 12 | Thika United | 30 | 10 | 5 | 15 | 31 | 42 | −11 | 35 | |
| 13 | Chemelil Sugar | 30 | 6 | 14 | 10 | 23 | 35 | −12 | 32 | |
| 14 | Nairobi City Stars | 30 | 6 | 10 | 14 | 25 | 37 | −12 | 28 | |
| 15 | Kenya Commercial Bank (R) | 30 | 6 | 8 | 16 | 34 | 48 | −14 | 26 | Relegation to 2016 National Super League |
| 16 | Nakuru AllStars (R) | 30 | 4 | 11 | 15 | 34 | 58 | −24 | 23 | Relegation to 2016 National Super League |

Updated to match(es) played on 1 November 2015. Source: Kenyan Premier League
Rules for classification: 1) points; 2) goal difference; 3) number of goals scored.
(C) Champions; (Q) Qualified for the phase indicated; (R) Relegated

=== FKF Premier League ===
The 2015 FKF Premier League season began on 14 February and ended on 7 November. Posta Rangers and Kakamega Homeboyz were promoted to the top flight, even after several teams boycotted matches due to the controversial awarding (and consequent denial) of points to Kakamega Homeboyz and Shabana (see sub-section below).

| Pos | Team | Pld | W | D | L | GF | GA | GD | Pts | Promotion or relegation |
|---|---|---|---|---|---|---|---|---|---|---|
| 1 | Posta Rangers (P) | 33 | 21 | 8 | 4 | 45 | 15 | +30 | 71 | Promotion to 2016 Kenyan Premier League |
| 2 | Kakamega Homeboyz (P) | 32 | 19 | 10 | 3 | 55 | 22 | +33 | 67 | Promotion to 2016 Kenyan Premier League |
| 3 | Zoo Kericho | 30 | 20 | 6 | 4 | 41 | 21 | +20 | 66 | |
| 4 | Kariobangi Sharks | 31 | 18 | 8 | 5 | 44 | 21 | +23 | 62 | |
| 5 | Nzoia United | 32 | 14 | 11 | 7 | 47 | 27 | +20 | 53 | |
| 6 | Bidco United | 32 | 14 | 11 | 7 | 40 | 27 | +13 | 53 | |
| 7 | Nakumatt | 31 | 15 | 8 | 8 | 36 | 25 | +11 | 53 | |
| 8 | West Kenya Sugar | 32 | 14 | 5 | 13 | 40 | 40 | 0 | 47 | |
| 9 | Agrochemical | 31 | 13 | 5 | 13 | 33 | 32 | +1 | 44 | |
| 10 | Oserian | 31 | 10 | 8 | 13 | 33 | 35 | −2 | 38 | |
| 11 | Shabana | 31 | 10 | 6 | 15 | 27 | 42 | −15 | 36 | |
| 12 | Nairobi Stima | 31 | 8 | 11 | 12 | 34 | 37 | −3 | 35 | |
| 13 | Modern Coast Rangers | 31 | 9 | 7 | 15 | 31 | 43 | −12 | 34 | |
| 14 | Ligi Ndogo | 31 | 8 | 6 | 17 | 32 | 48 | −16 | 30 | |
| 15 | FC Talanta | 32 | 8 | 6 | 18 | 29 | 46 | −17 | 30 | |
| 16 | MOSCA | 31 | 6 | 8 | 17 | 19 | 39 | −20 | 26 | |
| 17 | St. Joseph | 30 | 7 | 2 | 21 | 23 | 47 | −24 | 23 | Relegation to 2016 FKF Division One |
| 18 | Finlays Horticulture (R) | 34 | 3 | 6 | 25 | 16 | 58 | −42 | 15 | Relegation to 2016 FKF Division One |

Updated to match(es) played on 7 November 2015. Source: FKF Premier League
Rules for classification: 1) points; 2) goal difference; 3) number of goals scored.
(P) Promoted; (R) Relegated

The winners of the 2015 FKF President's Cup will qualify for the 2016 CAF Confederation Cup.

==== League suspension ====
On 22 October 2015, it was announced that the FKF Premier League was indefinitely suspended until several issues affecting the league are sorted out. The issues included the delayed payment of match officials, as well as an apparent lack of clarity of the number of teams to be promoted to and relegated from the Kenyan Premier League at the end of the season according to the memorandum of understanding between the KPL and the Football Kenya Federation signed earlier in the year.

The suspension of the league stemmed from the controversial awarding of three points and two goals to Shabana and Kakamega Homeboyz for their matches against West Kenya Sugar and St. Joseph respectively. Shabana had lost their match against West Kenya Sugar 3–0 at home, while the match between Kakamega Homeboyz and St. Joseph ended in a 0–0 draw. As a result of the rulings, which were given by the federation's National Leagues and Competitions Committee (NLCC), West Kenya Sugar and St. Joseph also had their points tallies and goal differences altered accordingly.

== Domestic cups ==
=== President's Cup ===
The 2015 FKF President's Cup began on 20 June and ended on 13 December.

Second round
19 September
Posta Rangers | 0
Nzoia United | 1
20 September
Tusker | 5
G.F.E. 105 | 0
20 September
Muhoroni Youth | 4
K.C.B. | 2
25 August
Police | 2
Western Stima | 1
19 September
Bondo United | 0
Bandari | 3
30 August
APS Bomet | 3
Border Lions | 1
21 June
Shabana | 2
Ulinzi Stars | 3
19 September
A.F.C. Leopards | 2
Wazito | 1
29 August
Fortune SACCO | 8
Vihiga United | 7
20 September
Nairobi City Stars | 1 (2)
Nakumatt | 1 (4)
20 September
Sony Sugar | w/o
Thika United | —
20 September
Modern Coast | 1 (3)
West Kenya Sugar | 1 (4)
20 September
Gor Mahia | 3
Ushuru | 2
19 September
Talanta | 0 (3)
Palos | 0 (4)
20 September
Sofapaka | 1 (3)
Admin. Police | 1 (5)
29 August
Fresha | 4
Timsales | 1

Third round
10 October
Nzoia United | 1 (5)
Tusker | 1 (4)
11 October
Muhoroni Youth | 1
Police | 1
10 October
Bandari | 2
APS Bomet | 1
21 October
Ulinzi Stars | 4
A.F.C. Leopards | 0
10 October
Fortune SACCO | 0
Nakumatt | 4
10 October
Sony Sugar | 2
West Kenya Sugar | 1
14 October
Gor Mahia | 4
Palos | 2
10 October
Admin. Police | 2
Fresha | 0

Quarter-finals
8 November
Nzoia United | 2
Muhoroni Youth | 3
7 November
Bandari | 1
Ulinzi Stars | 0
14 November
Nakumatt | 1 (3)
Sony Sugar | 1 (1)
20 November
Gor Mahia | 3
Admin. Police | 1

Semi-finals
15 November
Muhoroni Youth | 1
Bandari | 4
9 December
Nakumatt | 1 (4)
Gor Mahia | 1 (2)

Final
13 December
Bandari | 4
Nakumatt | 2
Third place
13 December
Muhoroni Youth | w/o
Gor Mahia | —

=== Super Cup ===
The 2015 Kenyan Super Cup match was played on 11 February between Gor Mahia, the 2014 Kenyan Premier League champions, and Sofapaka, the 2014 FKF President's Cup champions. Gor Mahia won the match 2–1 after 90 minutes.

| 11 February 2015 | Gor Mahia | 2–1 | Sofapaka | Madaraka Estate, Nairobi |
| 19:00 UTC+3 | Abondo 25', 68' | Report | Wafula 90' (o.g.) | Stadium: Nyayo National Stadium; Referee: Moses Osano |

=== Top 8 Cup ===
The 2015 KPL Top 8 Cup began on 26 September and ended on 7 November.

Quarterfinals
Sofapaka | 2 (5)
Chemelil Sugar | 2 (4)
Ulinzi Stars | 1 (4)
Sony Sugar | 1 (5)
Tusker | 4
A.F.C. Leopards | 2
Gor Mahia | 3
Muhoroni Youth | 0

Semifinals
Sofapaka | 2 | 1 | 3
Sony Sugar | 2 | 3 | 5
Tusker | 2 | 1 | 3
Gor Mahia | 2 | 2 | 4

Finals
Sony Sugar | 1
Gor Mahia | 2

== International club competitions ==
=== Champions League ===
The 2015 CAF Champions League began on February 13, 2015 and will end on November 8, 2015. Gor Mahia qualified for participation in the tournament as 2014 Kenyan Premier League champions.

==== Preliminary round ====
In the preliminary round, Gor Mahia faced Malagasy champions CNaPS Sport over two legs, played on 14 February and 1 March.

| 14 February 2015 Preliminaries | Gor Mahia (Kenya) | 1–0 | (Madagascar) CNaPS Sport | Madaraka Estate, Nairobi |
| 16:00 UTC+3 | Abondo 2' (pen.) | Report | | Stadium: Nyayo National Stadium; Referee: Denis Batte (Uganda) |

| 1 March 2015 Preliminaries | CNaPS Sport (Madagascar) | 3–2 | (Kenya) Gor Mahia | Antananarivo-Avaradrano, Antananarivo |
| 14:30 UTC+3 | Ralaidimy 7'; Vombola 37', 44' | Report | Abondo 29'; Odhiambo 90' | Stadium: Mahamasina Municipal Stadium; Referee: Nelson Emile Fred (Seychelles) |

3–3 on aggregate. Gor Mahia advance to the first round on away goals.

==== First round ====
In the first round, Gor Mahia faced Republic of the Congo champions AC Léopards over two legs, played on 15 March and 5 April.

| 15 March 2015 First round | Gor Mahia (Kenya) | 0–1 | (Republic of the Congo) AC Léopards | Madaraka Estate, Nairobi |
| 16:00 UTC+3 | | Report | Gandzé 50' | Stadium: Nyayo National Stadium; Referee: Parmendra Nunkoo (Mauritius) |

| 5 April 2015 First round | AC Léopards (Republic of the Congo) | 1–0 | (Kenya) Gor Mahia | Dolisie, Kimongo |
| 15:30 UTC+1 | Gandzé 42' | Report | | Stadium: Stade Denis Sassou Nguesso; Referee: Louis Hakizimana (Rwanda) |

=== Confederation Cup ===
The 2015 CAF Confederation Cup began on February 13, 2015. Sofapaka qualified for participation in the tournament as 2014 FKF President's Cup champions. They faced Zimbabwean cup champions FC Platinum in the preliminary round over two legs, played on 15 and 28 February.

| 15 February 2015 Preliminaries | Sofapaka (Kenya) | 1–2 | (Zimbabwe) FC Platinum | Madaraka Estate, Nairobi |
| 15:00 UTC+3 | Abdul Razak 47' | Report | Muzondiwa 25'; Ngoma 74' | Stadium: Nyayo National Stadium; Referee: El Fatih Wadeed Khaleel (Sudan) |

| 28 February 2015 Preliminaries | FC Platinum (Zimbabwe) | 2–1 | (Kenya) Sofapaka | Zvishavane, Midlands |
| 15:00 UTC+2 | Mtasa 15', 54' | Report | Abdul Razak 4' | Stadium: Mandava Stadium; Referee: Tirelo Mositwane (Botswana) |

=== Kagame Interclub Cup ===
The 2015 Kagame Interclub Cup began on 18 July and ended on 2 August. Gor Mahia represented Kenya in the competition.

==== Group stage ====
In the group stage, Gor Mahia were drawn in Group A alongside Tanzanian giants Yanga, Sudanese club Al-Khartoum, KMKM of Zanzibar and Djibouti Télécom of Djibouti. They finished top of the group, earning 10 points from a possible 12 from 4 matches, and advanced to the knockout stage.

Group A
| Team | Pld | W | D | L | GF | GA | GD | Pts |
|---|---|---|---|---|---|---|---|---|
| (Kenya) Gor Mahia | 4 | 3 | 1 | 0 | 9 | 4 | +5 | 10 |
| (Tanzania) Yanga | 4 | 3 | 0 | 1 | 7 | 2 | +5 | 9 |
| (Sudan) Al-Khartoum | 4 | 2 | 1 | 1 | 8 | 3 | +5 | 7 |
| (Zanzibar) KMKM | 4 | 1 | 0 | 3 | 3 | 7 | −4 | 3 |
| Djibouti Télécom | 4 | 0 | 0 | 4 | 1 | 12 | −11 | 0 |

| 18 July 2015 | Yanga (Tanzania) | 1–2 | (Kenya) Gor Mahia | National Stadium |
| 16:00 | Glay 4' (o.g.) | Report | Shakava 16'; Olunga 46' | Referee: Ssali Mashood (Uganda) |

| 20 July 2015 | Gor Mahia (Kenya) | 3–1 | (Zanzibar) KMKM | National Stadium |
| 14:00 | Kagere 2'; Olunga 68', 80' | Report | Saimon 10' | Referee: Issa Kagabo (Rwanda) |

| 24 July 2015 | Al-Khartoum (Sudan) | 1–1 | (Kenya) Gor Mahia | National Stadium |
| 14:00 | Baba 5' | Report | Ochieng 41' | Referee: Louis Hakizimana (Rwanda) |

| 26 July 2015 | Gor Mahia (Kenya) | 3–1 | Djibouti Télécom | National Stadium |
| 14:00 | Odhiambo 12'; Olunga 30'; Agwanda 82' | Report | Said 76' | Referee: Ring Nyer Akech Malong (South Sudan) |

==== Knockout stage ====
Gor Mahia began their knockout stage campaign in the quarter-finals against South Sudanese side Al-Malakia. They managed to progress all the way to the final, where they lost 2–0 to Tanzanian champions Azam.

Knockout stage — Bracket

Quarter-finals
28 July
(Rwanda) A.P.R. | 0
(Sudan) Al-Khartoum | 4
28 July
(Kenya) Gor Mahia | 2
(South Sudan) Al-Malakia | 1
29 July
(Tanzania) Yanga | 0 (3)
(Tanzania) Azam | 0 (5)
29 July
(Uganda) Kampala C.C.A. | 3
(Sudan) Al-Ahly Shendi | 0

Semi-finals
31 July 15:45
(Sudan) Al-Khartoum | 1
(Kenya) Gor Mahia | 3
31 July 13:45
(Tanzania) Azam | 1
(Uganda) Kampala C.C.A. | 0

Final
2 Aug 15:45
(Kenya) Gor Mahia | 0
(Tanzania) Azam | 2
Third place
2 Aug 13:45
(Sudan) Al-Khartoum | 1
(Uganda) Kampala C.C.A. | 2

| 28 July 2015 Quarter-finals | Gor Mahia (Kenya) | 2–1 | (South Sudan) Al-Malakia | National Stadium |
| 16:00 | Walusimbi 2', 68' | Report | Jacob (?) | Referee: Martin Saanya (Tanzania) |

| 31 July 2015 Semi-finals | Al-Khartoum (Sudan) | 1–3 | (Kenya) Gor Mahia | National Stadium |
| 13:45 | Elmani 5' | Report | Olunga 24' (pen.); Wafula 26'; Kagere 54' | Referee: Issa Kagabo (Rwanda) |

| 2 August 2015 Final | Azam (Tanzania) | 2–0 | (Kenya) Gor Mahia | National Stadium |
| 15:45 | Bocco 17'; Tche Tche 64' | Report | | Referee: Louis Hakizimana (Rwanda) |

== National teams ==
=== Men's senior ===
==== World Cup qualification ====
The men's senior national team participated in qualification for the 2018 FIFA World Cup.

===== First round =====
Kenya began its campaign in the first round, where they faced Mauritius over two legs, played on 7 and 11 October. They advanced to the second round after winning 5–2 on aggregate.

| 7 October 2015 | Mauritius | 2–5 | Kenya | Belle Vue Maurel, Pamplemousses |
| 18:30 UTC+4 | Sophie 66' (pen.); Bru 78' | Report (FIFA); Report (CAF) | Omolo 18', 82'; Masika 23'; Shakava 49'; Olunga 87' | Stadium: Stade Anjalay; Referee: Duncan Lengani (Malawi) |

| 11 October 2015 | Kenya | 0–0 | Mauritius | Kasarani, Nairobi |
| 16:00 UTC+3 | | Report (FIFA); Report (CAF) | | Stadium: Moi International Sports Centre; Referee: Cosmas Mandeng Bakaly (Cameroon) |

===== Second round =====
In the second round, Kenya faced Cape Verde over two legs, played on 13 and 17 November. They were eliminated after losing 2–1 on aggregate.

| 13 November 2015 | Kenya | 1–0 | Cape Verde | Madaraka Estate, Nairobi |
| 16:00 UTC+3 | Olunga 9' | Report (FIFA); Report (CAF) | | Stadium: Nyayo National Stadium; Referee: Denis Dembélé (Ivory Coast) |

| 17 November 2015 | Cape Verde | 2–0 | Kenya | Achada São Filipe, Praia |
| 18:00 UTC−1 | Héldon 45', 52' | Report (FIFA); Report (CAF) | | Stadium: Estádio Nacional de Cabo Verde; Referee: Joseph Lamptey (Ghana) |

==== Africa Cup of Nations qualification ====
The men's senior national team participated in qualification for the 2017 Africa Cup of Nations. They were drawn in Group E alongside Zambia, Congo and Guinea-Bissau.

| Pos | Team | Pld | W | D | L | GF | GA | GD | Pts | Qualification |
|---|---|---|---|---|---|---|---|---|---|---|
| 1 | Guinea-Bissau | 6 | 3 | 1 | 2 | 7 | 7 | 0 | 10 | Final tournament |
| 2 | Congo | 6 | 2 | 3 | 1 | 9 | 7 | +2 | 9 | |
| 3 | Zambia | 6 | 1 | 4 | 1 | 7 | 7 | 0 | 7 | |
| 4 | Kenya | 6 | 1 | 2 | 3 | 5 | 7 | −2 | 5 | |

Source: CAF

| 14 June 2015 | Congo | 1–1 | Kenya | Owando, Cuvette |
| 15:30 UTC+1 | Oniangué 37' (pen.) | Report | Were 12' | Stadium: Stade Omnisport Marien Ngouabi d'Owando; Referee: Thierry Nkurunziza (Burundi) |

| 6 September 2015 | Kenya | 1–2 | Zambia | Madaraka Estate, Nairobi |
| 16:00 UTC+3 | Olunga 13' | Report | Kalengo 28'; Mbesuma 42' | Stadium: Nyayo National Stadium, Nairobi; Referee: Mutaz Khairalla (Sudan) |

==== African Nations Championship qualification ====
The men's senior national team participated in qualification for the 2016 African Nations Championship.

===== Preliminary round =====
Joining the competition in the preliminary round of the Central-East Zone, Kenya faced Ethiopia over two legs, played on 21 June and 4 July. They were eliminated from the competition, having lost 2–0 on aggregate.

| 21 June 2015 | Ethiopia | 2–0 | Kenya | Bahir Dar, Amhara |
| 16:00 UTC+3 | Girma 23'; Panom 77' (pen.) | | | Stadium: Bahir Dar Stadium; Referee: Mohammed Omar Ragab (Libya) |

| 4 July 2015 | Kenya | 0–0 | Ethiopia | Madaraka Estate, Nairobi |
| 16:00 UTC+3 | | | | Stadium: Nyayo National Stadium; Referee: Adélaïde Ali Mohamed (Comoros) |

==== Other matches ====
The following is a list of all other matches played by the men's senior national team in 2015.

| 28 March 2015 International friendly | Seychelles | 0–2 | Kenya | Victoria, Mahé |
| 14:30 UTC+4 | | Report | Odongo (?); Shivachi (?) | Stadium: Stade Linité |

| 6 June 2015 Kwibuka; Tournament | Rwanda | 0–0 | Kenya | Gasabo, Kigali |
| 15:30 UTC+2 | | Report | | Stadium: Amahoro Stadium |

| 7 June 2015 Kwibuka; Tournament | Kenya | 2–0 | South Sudan | Gasabo, Kigali |
| 13:00 UTC+2 | Wanyama (?); Olunga (?) | Report | | Stadium: Amahoro Stadium |

=== Women's senior ===
==== CAF Women's Olympic Qualifying Tournament ====
The women's senior national team participated in qualification for the 2016 Summer Olympics.

===== Second round =====
Joining the competition in the second round, Kenya faced Botswana over two legs, played on 22 and 31 May. They advanced to the third round on away goals rule, after drawing 2–2 on aggregate.

| 22 May 2015 | Botswana | 2–1 | Kenya | Lobatse, South-East |
| 16:00 UTC+2 | Tholakele 20'; Keleboge 30' | Report | Kinuthia 90+3' | Stadium: Lobatse Stadium |

| 31 May 2015 | Kenya | 1–0 | Botswana | Machakos, Machakos |
| 15:30 UTC+3 | Shikobe 90' | Report | | Stadium: Kenyatta Stadium |

===== Third round =====
In the third round, Kenya faced South Africa over two legs, played on 18 July and 2 August. They were eliminated from the competition, having lost 2–0 on aggregate.

| 18 July 2015 | South Africa | 1–0 | Kenya | Soweto, Johannesburg |
| 15:00 UTC+2 | Ramalepe 75' | Report | | Stadium: Dobsonville Stadium |

| 2 August 2015 | Kenya | 0–1 | South Africa | Machakos, Machakos |
| 15:30 UTC+3 | | Report | Muluadzi 24' | Stadium: Kenyatta Stadium |

=== Men's under-23 ===
==== CAF U-23 Championship qualification ====
The men's under-23 national team took part in qualification for the 2015 CAF U-23 Championship. Entering qualification in the first round, Kenya faced Botswana over two legs, played on 24 April and 9 May. They were eliminated on away goals rule, after drawing 4–4 on aggregate.

| 24 April 2015 | Botswana | 3–0 | Kenya | Lobatse, South-East |
| 19:00 UTC+2 | Kebatho 66', 86'; Makgantai 67' | Report | | Stadium: Lobatse Stadium; Referee: Norman Matemera (Zimbabwe) |

| 9 May 2015 | Kenya | 4–1 | Botswana | Madaraka Estate, Nairobi |
| 16:00 UTC+3 | Olunga 19', 36', 90'; Ndirangu 78' | Report | Kebatho 22' | Stadium: Nyayo National Stadium; Referee: Abdoul Karim Twagiramukiza (Rwanda) |
