= 2014–15 in Kenyan football =

2014–15 in Kenyan football may refer to:

- 2014 in Kenyan football
- 2015 in Kenyan football
