= Brenda Wambui =

Kenyan political journalist, blogger, podcaster and feminist activist

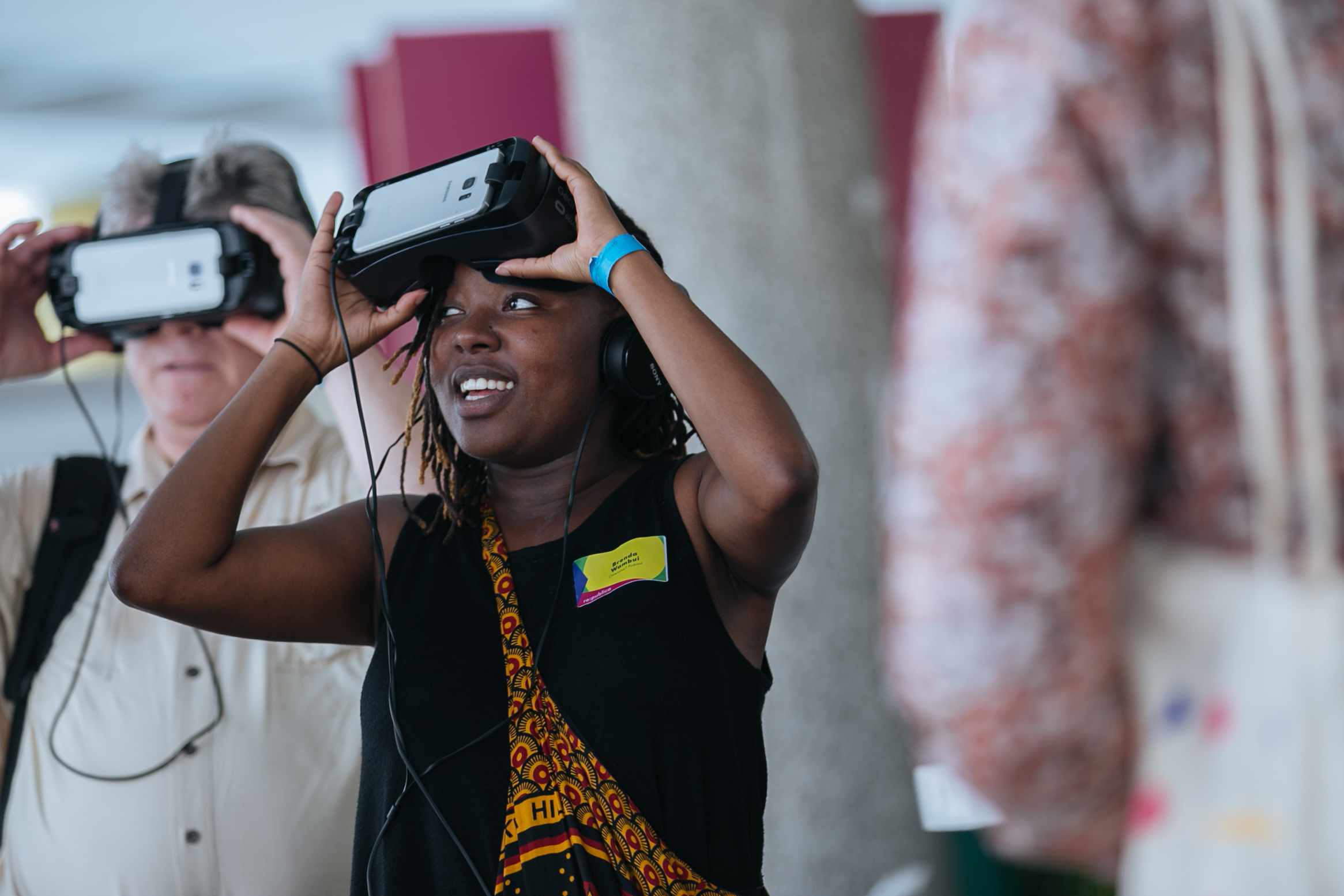
- Wambui in 2018
- Education: Strathmore University; London School of Economics
- Occupations: political journalist, blogger, podcaster and feminist activist
- Website: www.brendawambui.com

Brenda Wambui is a Kenyan political journalist, blogger, podcaster and feminist activist. She is the co-founder and former CEO of the online media organization Brainstorm Africa and hosted the International Women's Media Foundation funded news podcast Otherwise?

== Education ==
Wambui studied a bachelors degree at Strathmore University in Kenya. She is studying towards an MSc in Public Policy and Administration at the London School of Economics in the United Kingdom.

== Career ==
Wambui published the weekly blog Brainstorm, with Michael Onsando, which won best political blog at the 2014 Kenyan Blog Awards. She founded the quarterly online feminist journal When Women Speak.

The International Women's Media Foundation's Fund for Women Journalists funded Wambui's weekly current affairs and political podcast Otherwise? She also provided coverage for the 2017 Kenyan general election for the BBC's Kenya Election Watch podcast.

Wambui has served as an advisor at FRIDA's Young Feminist Fund. She founded the online media organization Brainstorm Africa and was CEO between 2013 and 2018. She has been interviewed by Business Daily Africa on the decline of social media advertising revenue in Kenya.

In 2021, Wambui wrote a chapter for the book Pioneers, Rebels and a Few Villains: 150 Years of Journalism in Eastern Africa, which was edited by Charles Onyango-Obbo.
