= 2015 Kagame Interclub Cup =

CECAFA Kagame Cup

Tournament details
- Host country: Tanzania
- Dates: July 18–August 2
- Teams: 13
- Venues: 2 (in 2 host cities)

Final positions
- Champions: (Tanzania) Azam (1st title)
- Runners-up: (Kenya) Gor Mahia
- Third place: (Uganda) Kampala C.C.A.
- Fourth place: (Sudan) Al-Khartoum

Tournament statistics
- Matches played: 30
- Goals scored: 55 (1.83 per match)
- Top scorer: (Kenya) Michael Olunga (5 goals)

The 2015 Kagame Interclub Cup was the 40th edition of the Kagame Interclub Cup, which is organised by CECAFA. It took place in Tanzania from 18 July to 2 August.

All times shown are in East Africa Time (UTC+3).

== Broadcasting ==
South African sports channel SuperSport secured official rights to broadcast all matches played at the tournament, and this year secured a contract to broadcast the cup for the next 4 years.

== Participants ==
The following 13 clubs took part in the competition:

Group A

- (Tanzania) Yanga
- (Kenya) Gor Mahia
- (Sudan) Al-Khartoum
- (Zanzibar) KMKM
- Djibouti Télécom

Group B

- (Rwanda) A.P.R.
- (Sudan) Al-Ahly Shendi
- (Burundi) LLB Académic
- (Somalia) Elman

Group C

- (Uganda) Kampala C.C.A.
- (Tanzania) Azam
- (South Sudan) Al-Malakia
- (Ethiopia) Adama City

== Group stage ==
Tie-breaking criteria for group play
The ranking of teams in each group was based on the following criteria:
1. Number of points obtained in games between the teams involved
2. Goal difference in games between the teams involved
3. Goals scored in games between the teams involved
4. Away goals scored in games between the teams involved
5. Goal difference in all games
6. Goals scored in all games
7. Drawing of lots

The group stage featured thirteen teams, with 5 teams in Group A and 4 teams in Group B and C. Three teams from Group A and B and two teams from Group C advanced to the knockout stage.

=== Group A ===
Team	Pld	W	D	L	GF	GA	GD	Pts
(Kenya) Gor Mahia	4	3	1	0	9	4	+5	10
(Tanzania) Yanga	4	3	0	1	7	2	+5	9
(Sudan) Al-Khartoum	4	2	1	1	8	3	+5	7
(Zanzibar) KMKM	4	1	0	3	3	7	−4	3
Djibouti Télécom	4	0	0	4	1	12	−11	0

18 July 2015
16:00

Yanga (Tanzania)	1–2	(Kenya) Gor Mahia
Glay 4' (o.g.)	Report	Shakava 16'; Olunga 46'

National Stadium
Referee: Ssali Mashood (Uganda)

18 July 2015
16:00

KMKM (Zanzibar)	1–0	Djibouti Télécom
Mbwana Faki (?)

Amaan Stadium
Referee: Issa Kagabo (Rwanda)

20 July 2015
14:00

Djibouti Télécom	0–5	(Sudan) Al-Khartoum
	Report	Salah Osman 22'; Salah Osman 36'; Ousamalia 66'; Wagdi 81'; Murwan 87'

National Stadium
Referee: Ssali Mashood (Uganda)

20 July 2015
14:00

Gor Mahia (Kenya)	3–1	(Zanzibar) KMKM
Kagere 2'; Olunga 68', 80'	Report	Saimon 10'

National Stadium
Referee: Issa Kagabo (Rwanda)

22 July 2015
14:00

Al-Khartoum (Sudan)	2–1	(Zanzibar) KMKM
Salah Osman 7'; Akumu 81'	Report	Saimon 58'

National Stadium
Referee: Louis Hakizimana (Rwanda)

22 July 2015
16:00

Djibouti Télécom	0–3	(Tanzania) Yanga
	Report	Mwashiuya (?); Busungu (?)

National Stadium
Referee: Issa Kagabo (Rwanda)

24 July 2015
14:00

Al-Khartoum (Sudan)	1–1	(Kenya) Gor Mahia
Baba 5'	Report	Ochieng 41'

National Stadium
Referee: Louis Hakizimana (Rwanda)

24 July 2015
16:00

KMKM (Zanzibar)	0–2	(Tanzania) Yanga
	Report	Busungu 56'; Tambwe (?)

National Stadium
Referee: Souleiman Ahmed Djama (Djibouti)

26 July 2015
14:00

Gor Mahia (Kenya)	3–1	Djibouti Télécom
Odhiambo 12'; Olunga 30'; Agwanda 82'	Report	Said 76'

National Stadium
Referee: Ring Nyer Akech Malong (South Sudan)

26 July 2015
16:00

Yanga (Tanzania)	1–0	(Sudan) Al-Khartoum
Niyonzima 30'	Report

National Stadium
Referee: Louis Hakizimana (Rwanda)

=== Group B ===
Team	Pld	W	D	L	GF	GA	GD	Pts
(Rwanda) A.P.R.	3	3	0	0	5	1	+4	9
(Sudan) Al-Ahly Shendi	3	1	1	1	5	5	0	4
(Burundi) LLB Académic	3	0	2	1	3	4	−1	2
(Somalia) Heegan	3	0	1	2	2	5	−3	1

18 July 2015
14:00

A.P.R. (Rwanda)	1–0	(Sudan) Al-Ahly Shendi
Bizimana 64'	Report

National Stadium
Referee: Souleiman Ahmed Djama (Djibouti)

19 July 2015
16:00

LLB Académic (Burundi)	0–0	(Somalia) Heegan
	Report

Amaan Stadium
Referee: Ring Nyer Akech Malong (South Sudan)

21 July 2015
14:00

Al-Ahly Shendi (Sudan)	2–2	(Burundi) LLB Académic
Marghani (?); Marghani 70'	Report	Duhayindavyi 55'; Nahimana 65'

National Stadium
Referee: Ring Nyer Akech Malong (South Sudan)

21 July 2015
16:00

Heegan (Somalia)	0–2	(Rwanda) A.P.R.
	report	Ndahinduka (?); Nkinzingabo (?)

Amaan Stadium
Referee: Souleiman Ahmed Djama (Djibouti)

23 July 2015
14:00

Heegan (Somalia)	2–3	(Sudan) Al-Ahly Shendi
Haji (?); Alkhidir Ali (?)	report	Abakar (?); Abakar 05'; Ahmed 29'

National Stadium
Referee: Ssali Mashood (Uganda)

23 July 2015
16:00

A.P.R. (Rwanda)	2–1	(Burundi) LLB Académic
Siwomana 59'; Bigirimana 89'	report	Nahimana 53'

National Stadium
Referee: Martin Saanya (Tanzania)

=== Group C ===
Team	Pld	W	D	L	GF	GA	GD	Pts
(Tanzania) Azam	3	3	0	0	8	0	+8	9
(Uganda) Kampala C.C.A.	3	2	0	1	2	1	+1	6
(South Sudan) Al-Malakia	3	1	0	2	2	4	−2	3
(Ethiopia) Adama City	3	0	0	3	1	8	−7	0

19 July 2015
14:00

Adama City (Ethiopia)	1–2	(South Sudan) Al-Malakia
Elemayehu 30'	Report	Opera 36'; Ssekamatte 76'

National Stadium
Referee: Louis Hakizimana (Rwanda)

19 July 2015
16:00

Azam (Tanzania)	1–0	(Uganda) Kampala C.C.A.
Bocco 13'	Report

National Stadium
Referee: Davis Omweno (Kenya)

21 July 2015
16:00

(South Sudan) Al-Malakia	0–2	(Tanzania) Azam
	Report	Bocco 25'; Tche Tche 51'

National Stadium
Referee: Davis Omweno (Kenya)

22 July 2015
16:00

(Uganda) Kampala C.C.A.	1–0	(Ethiopia) Adama City
Masiko 69'	Report

Amaan Stadium
Referee: Martin Sanya (Tanzania)

25 July 2015
14:00

(Uganda) Kampala C.C.A.	1–0	(South Sudan) Al-Malakia
Sserunkuma (?)	Report

National Stadium

25 July 2015
16:00

(Ethiopia) Adama City	0–5	(Tanzania) Azam
	Report	Tche Tche 7', 31'; Mussa 31'; Yahya 49'; Morris 73'

National Stadium
Referee: Issa Kagabo (Rwanda)

== Knockout stage ==
In the knockout stage, teams played against each other once. The losers of the semi-finals played against each other in a third place playoff where the winner was placed third overall in the entire competition.

=== Bracket ===
Quarter-finals
28 July
(Rwanda) A.P.R.	0
(Sudan) Al-Khartoum	4
28 July
(Kenya) Gor Mahia	2
(South Sudan) Al-Malakia	1
29 July
(Tanzania) Yanga	0 (3)
(Tanzania) Azam	0 (5)
29 July
(Uganda) Kampala C.C.A.	3
(Sudan) Al-Ahly Shendi	0

Semi-finals
31 July 15:45
(Sudan) Al-Khartoum	1
(Kenya) Gor Mahia	3
31 July 13:45
(Tanzania) Azam	1
(Uganda) Kampala C.C.A.	0

Final
2 Aug 15:45
(Kenya) Gor Mahia	0
(Tanzania) Azam	2
Third place
2 Aug 13:45
(Sudan) Al-Khartoum	1
(Uganda) Kampala C.C.A.	2

=== Quarter-finals ===
28 July 2015
14:00

A.P.R. (Rwanda)	0–4	(Sudan) Al-Khartoum
	Report	Khalid 10'; Ibrahim 21', 39'; Salaheldin 71'

National Stadium
Referee: Ssali Mashood (Uganda)

28 July 2015
16:00

Gor Mahia (Kenya)	2–1	(South Sudan) Al-Malakia
Walusimbi 2', 28'	Report	Jacob 64'

National Stadium
Referee: Martin Saanya (Tanzania)

29 July 2015
14:00

Kampala C.C.A. (Uganda)	3–0	(Sudan) Al-Ahly Shendi
Ochaya 16'; Mutyaba 76'; Masiko 77'	Report

National Stadium
Referee: Souleiman Ahmed Djama (Djibouti)

29 July 2015
16:00

Azam (Tanzania)	0–0 (90 min.)	(Tanzania) Yanga
	Report
Penalties
Tche Tche (penalty scored); Bocco (penalty scored); Mao (penalty scored); Wawa (penalty scored); Morris (penalty scored)	5–3	(penalty scored) Salum Telela; (penalty scored) Haroub; (penalty scored) Mwashuya; (penalty missed) Mwyinyi

National Stadium
Referee: Davis Omweno (Kenya)

=== Semi-finals ===
31 July 2015
13:45

Al-Khartoum (Sudan)	1–3	(Kenya) Gor Mahia
Elmani 5'	Report	Olunga 24' (pen.); Wafula 26'; Kagere 54'

National Stadium
Referee: Issa Kagabo (Rwanda)

31 July 2015
15:45

Kampala C.C.A. (Uganda)	0–1	(Tanzania) Azam
	Report	Musa 76'

National Stadium
Referee: Souleiman Ahmed Djama (Djibouti)

=== Third place play-off ===
2 August 2015
13:45

Al-Khartoum (Sudan)	1–2	(Uganda) Kampala C.C.A.
Baba 24'	Report	Birungi 7'; Mutyaba 9'

National Stadium
Referee: Martin Saanya (Tanzania)

=== Final ===
2 August 2015
15:45

Azam (Tanzania)	2–0	(Kenya) Gor Mahia
Bocco 17'; Tche Tche 64'	Report

National Stadium
Referee: Louis Hakizimana (Rwanda)

2015 Kagame Interclub Cup champions

1st title

== Top scorers ==
Rank	Name	Team	Goals
1	Michael Olunga	(Kenya) Gor Mahia	5
2	Osman Bilal Salaheldin	(Sudan) Al-Khartoum	4
2	Kipre Herman Tche Tche	(Tanzania) Azam F.C.	4
4	Malimi Busungu	(Tanzania) Yanga F.C.	3
4	Amin Ibrahim	(Sudan) Al-Khartoum	3
4	Ousamalia Baba	(Sudan) Al-Khartoum	3
4	John Bocco	(Tanzania) Azam F.C.	3
8	Meddie Kagere	(Kenya) Gor Mahia	2
8	Farid Mussa	(Tanzania) Azam F.C.	2
8	Aziz Abdoul Nahimana	(Burundi) LLB Académic	2
8	Mateo Saimon	(Zanzibar) KMKM	2
8	Godfrey Walusimbi	(Kenya) Gor Mahia	2
8	Muzamir Mutyaba	(Uganda) K.C.C. Authority	2
8	Tom Masiko	(Uganda) K.C.C. Authority	2
8	Eid Abakar	(Sudan) Al-Ahly Shendi	2
8	Mohamed Awad Marghani	(Sudan) Al-Ahly Shendi	2
17	Isaac Sserunkuma	(Uganda) K.C.C. Authority	1
17	Samuel Ssekamatte	(South Sudan) Al-Malakia	1
17	Atif Khalid	(Sudan) Al-Khartoum	1
17	Gael Duhayindavyi	(Burundi) LLB Académic	1
17	Anthony Akumu	(Sudan) Al-Khartoum	1
17	Takele Elemayehu	(Ethiopia) Adama City	1
17	Elsadig Ahmed	(Sudan) Al-Ahly Shendi	1
17	Mudathir Yahya	(Tanzania) Azam F.C.	1
17	Sadam Opera	(South Sudan) Al-Malakia	1
17	Michel Ndahinduka	(Rwanda) A.P.R.	1
17	Mohamed Mahad Haji	(Somalia) Heegan	1
17	Aggrey Morris	(Tanzania) Azam F.C.	1
17	Donald Ngoma	(Tanzania) Yanga F.C.	1
17	Joseph Ochaya	(Uganda) K.C.C. Authority	1
17	Fiston Nkinzingabo	(Rwanda) A.P.R.	1
Source: Kawowo Sports
