= Kenyan football league system =

The Kenyan football league system is a series of several interconnected leagues for association football clubs in Kenya.

== Structure ==
As of 2017, the top tier league in Kenya is the FKF Premier League, with the FKF National Super League below it. The FKF National Division One and National Division Two are the third and fourth tiers of the system respectively, both divided into two zones for the Eastern and Western halves of Kenya. Division Two is further divided into two groups consisting of teams from various regions in Eastern and Western Kenya.

Below the national leagues are the Regional Leagues, divided into regional divisions based on the former Provinces of Kenya (except for North Eastern), some of which are further divided into a number of zones. The County Champions League and the Sub-County Leagues make up the bottom two tiers of the Kenyan football league system.

In women's football, the Women's Premier League is the top tier league, with the Women's Division One below it.

== History ==
In November 2012, the Football Kenya Federation began talks to create Division Two, which, if approved, will go above the Provincial League as the third tier. The proposal says that the league will be made of 16 teams; the four relegated teams from both zones of Division One and one team from each of the eight provincial leagues. The 16 teams will be divided into two zones of eight teams each on the same basis as Division One in terms of locations of teams in the zones. The winners from each zone would be promoted to their respective zones in Division One, e.g. the winner from Zone A in Division Two would be promoted to Zone A in Division One.

On 25 April 2013, the Football Kenya Federation decided to slash the league to 20 teams for the 2014 season. For that to happen, it was decided that the league will consist of top 5 teams in each zone (except the two teams that win the promotion play-offs) in addition to the two relegated Premier League teams. The remaining 29 teams will be relegated to FKF Division Two, which will begin next season, along with the 8 teams promoted from the Provincial League.

On 10 July 2013, it was announced that the Football Kenya Federation introduced a new league system to take effect from the beginning of the 2014 season. For the 2015 season, the Kenyan Premier League was to be contested by 18 teams, up from 16 for the 2014 season.

At the beginning of the 2015 season, talks between the Kenyan Premier League and the Football Kenya Federation concerning the expansion of the top flight collapsed, ultimately resulting in the formation of a new parallel top division called the FKF Premier League (FKF PL) consisting of 18 teams, with the KPL maintaining its composition of 16 teams. However, on 23 March 2015, the two parties reached an agreement that gave the KPL official recognition as Kenya's top division and the FKF PL as Kenya's second division for 2015, with a memorandum of understanding outlining the promotion and relegation system between the two leagues for 2015 and the relationship between the KPL and the federation regarding the running of the top division from 2016 onwards.

== Current system ==
As of the 2017 season.

Level	League/Division(s)							
1 Premier League	Kenyan Premier League; 18 clubs							
2 Super League	Kenyan National Super League; 20 clubs							
3 Division One	Zone A 14 clubs				Zone B 14 clubs			
4 Division Two	Western Zone; 15 clubs		Central Zone; 30 clubs		Eastern Zone; 24 clubs		Northern Zone; 15 clubs	
5 Regional Leagues	Nyanza League; 20 clubs	Western League; 20 clubs	Rift Valley League; 20 clubs	Central League; 20 clubs	Nairobi League; 20 clubs	Eastern League; 20 clubs	North Eastern League; 20 clubs	Coast League; 20 clubs
6 County; Champions League	Baringo League	Bomet League	Bungoma League	Busia League	Embu League	Garissa League	Isiolo League	Kiambu League
6 County; Champions League	Elgeyo-Marakwet League	Homa Bay League	Kajiado League	Kakamega League	Kilifi League	Kirinyaga League	Kitui League	Kwale League
6 County; Champions League	Kericho League	Kisii League	Kisumu League	Laikipia League	Lamu League	Machakos League	Makueni League	Mandera League
6 County; Champions League	Migori League	Nakuru League	Nandi League	Narok League	Marsabit League	Meru League	Mombasa League	Murang'a League
6 County; Champions League	Nyamira League	Samburu League	Siaya League	Trans-Nzoia League	Nairobi A. League	Nairobi B. League	Nyandarua League	Nyeri League
6 County; Champions League	Turkana League	Uasin Gishu League	Vihiga League	West Pokot League	Taita-Taveta League	Tana River League	Tharaka-Nithi League	Wajir League
7 Sub-County Leagues	Sub-County Leagues							
