= Tyrus Omondi =

Kenyan footballer

Personal information
- Date of birth: 7 December 1994 (age 31)
- Position: Midfielder

Team information
- Current team: Kenya Commercial Bank

Senior career*
Years	Team	Apps	(Gls)
2012	Mathare United		
2013–	Kenya Commercial Bank		

International career^{‡}
2016–	Kenya	1	(0)
- * Club domestic league appearances and goals as of 14:05, 1 May 2017 (UTC) ‡ National team caps and goals as of 14:05, 1 May 2017 (UTC)

Tyrus Omondi (born 7 December 1994) is a Kenyan international footballer who plays for Kenya Commercial Bank, as a midfielder.

== Career ==
Omondi has played club football for Mathare United and Kenya Commercial Bank.

He made his international debut for Kenya in 2016.
