= Collins Ochieng =

Kenyan footballer (born 1987)

Personal information
- Full name: Collins Ochieng Otieno
- Date of birth: 9 June 1987 (age 39)
- Place of birth: Kakamega, Kenya
- Height: 1.87 m (6 ft 2 in)
- Position: Defender

Senior career*
Years	Team	Apps	(Gls)
2006–2008	Ulinzi Stars		
2009–2012	Nairobi City Stars		
2013–2017	Ulinzi Stars		

International career
2007	Kenya	5	(0)
- * Club domestic league appearances and goals

Collins Ochieng Otieno (born 9 June 1987) is a Kenyan former footballer who played as a defender.

== Career ==
Born in Kakamega, Ochieng played club football for Ulinzi Stars and Nairobi City Stars.

He earned 5 caps for the Kenyan national team.
