= Danson Kago =

Kenyan footballer (born 1994)

Personal information
- Full name: Danson Mumu Kago
- Date of birth: 16 June 1994 (age 32)
- Place of birth: Thika, Kenya
- Height: 1.68 m (5 ft 6 in)
- Position: Striker

Team information
- Current team: Posta Rangers

Senior career*
Years	Team	Apps	(Gls)
2011	Posta Rangers		
2012–2015	Sofapaka		
2016–2017	Tusker		
2018–	Posta Rangers		

International career^{‡}
2014–	Kenya	5	(0)
- * Club domestic league appearances and goals as of 12:25, 1 May 2017 (UTC) ‡ National team caps and goals as of 26 February 2018

Danson Mumu Kago (born 16 June 1994) is a Kenyan international footballer who plays for Posta Rangers, as a striker.

== Career ==
Born in Thika, Kago has played club football for Posta Rangers, Sofapaka and Tusker.

He made his international debut for Kenya in 2014.
