= Kenyan Sub-County Leagues =

Lowest football tier in Kenya

Sub-County Leagues
- Founded: 10 July 2013
- Country: Kenya
- Confederation: CAF
- Divisions: 1
- Number of clubs: 8
- Level on pyramid: 6
- Promotion to: County Champions League
- Domestic cup: President's Cup

The Kenyan Sub-County Leagues are the sixth and lowest tier of the Kenyan football league system. They have a promotion and relegation system with the Kenyan County Champions League. Member clubs are amateur.

The leagues were formed on 10 July 2013 in line with the introduction of a new six-tier system by the Football Kenya Federation to take effect from the beginning of the 2014 season.

== See also ==
- Kenyan football league system
