= Vincent Ogutu =

Kenyan academic

- Occupation: Academician

Academic background
- Education: University of Nairobi

Academic work
- Discipline: Economist
- Institutions: Strathmore University

Vincent Ogutu is a Kenyan academic and the second Vice-Chancellor at Strathmore University in Nairobi, Kenya. He has been in office since 30 March 2023 to date. He took over from John Odhiambo, who led the university for fifteen years.

== Early life and education ==
Vincent was born in Eastleigh, Nairobi. He started his education at St Teresa's Primary School in Eastleigh. He obtained a bachelor's degree in economics at the University of Nairobi. He proceeded to the University of London, where he obtained a Master of Science in Financial Economics. He later pursued a Ph.D. in organizational management at Rutgers University.

== Academic career ==
In 1996, Vincent began his career at Strathmore School, where he served as deputy principal. He became the first director of the MBA for Executives program at Strathmore University Business School. He was also appointed Vice Dean for Executive Talent Development at the same institution. He proceeded to serve as the director of the university's regional academies in Uganda, Rwanda, and Tanzania. Vincent was appointed Deputy Vice-Chancellor for Planning and Development at Strathmore University. On the 30th of March 2023, he became the Vice-Chancellor at Strathmore University, and he is the second person to hold the position. He took over from Professor John Odhiambo, who led the university for fifteen years.
