= Ian Otieno =

Kenyan footballer

Personal information
- Date of birth: 9 August 1993 (age 33)
- Place of birth: Siaya, Kenya
- Height: 1.83 m (6 ft 0 in)
- Position: Goalkeeper

Team information
- Current team: Richards Bay
- Number: 1

Senior career*
Years	Team	Apps	(Gls)
2013–2016	Posta Rangers		
2016–2018	A.F.C. Leopards	25	(0)
2018–2020	Red Arrows		
2020–2024	ZESCO United		
2024–	Richards Bay	20	(0)

International career^{‡}
2015–	Kenya	10	(0)
- * Club domestic league appearances and goals as of 4 January 2026 ‡ National team caps and goals as of 20:37, 27 June 2023 (UTC)

Ian Otieno (born 9 August 1993) is a Kenyan international footballer who plays for Richards Bay as a goalkeeper.

== Career ==
Born in Siaya, Otieno has played club football for Posta Rangers, A.F.C. Leopards, Red Arrows and ZESCO United. Otieno signed for ZESCO United in January 2020 on a three-year contract. In July 2024 he signed for South African club Richards Bay.

He made his international debut for Kenya in 2015.
