= Kenyan County Champions League =

County Champions League
- Founded: 10 July 2013
- Country: Kenya
- Confederation: CAF
- Divisions: 48
- Level on pyramid: 5
- Promotion to: Regional Leagues
- Relegation to: Sub-County Leagues
- Domestic cup: President's Cup

The Kenyan County Champions League is the fifth tier of the Kenyan football league system. It has a promotion and relegation system with the Kenyan Regional Leagues and the Kenyan Sub-County Leagues. Member clubs are amateur.

The league was formed on 10 July 2013 in line with the introduction of a new six-tier system by the Football Kenya Federation to take effect from the beginning of the 2014 season.

== See also ==
- Kenyan football league system
