= Strathmore University =

University in Kenya

- Former name: Strathmore College
- Motto: Ut omnes unum sint (Latin)
- Motto in English: "That all may be one"
- Type: Private
- Established: 1961; 65 years ago
- Founder: Josemaría Escrivá
- Parent institution: Strathmore Educational Trust
- Chancellor: Msg. Fernando Ocáriz
- Vice-Chancellor: Vincent Ogutu
- Faculty: 208
- Administrative staff: 422
- Undergraduates: 5,088
- Postgraduates: Offered
- Location: Nairobi, Kenya; 1°18′36″S 36°48′48″E
- Campus: Madaraka (40 acres (162,000 m^{2}))
- Website: www.strathmore.edu

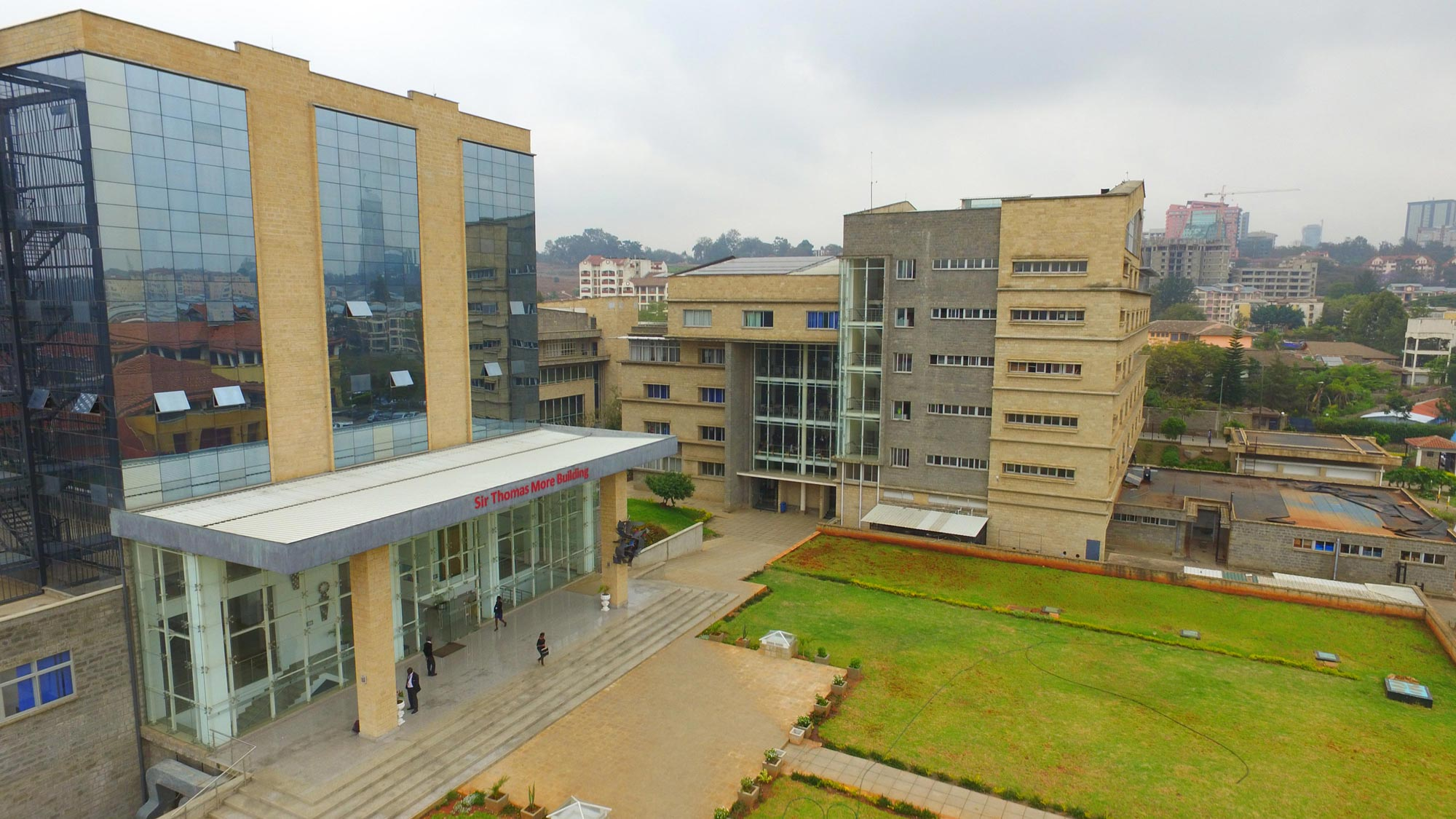
Aerial view of Strathmore University Keri campus

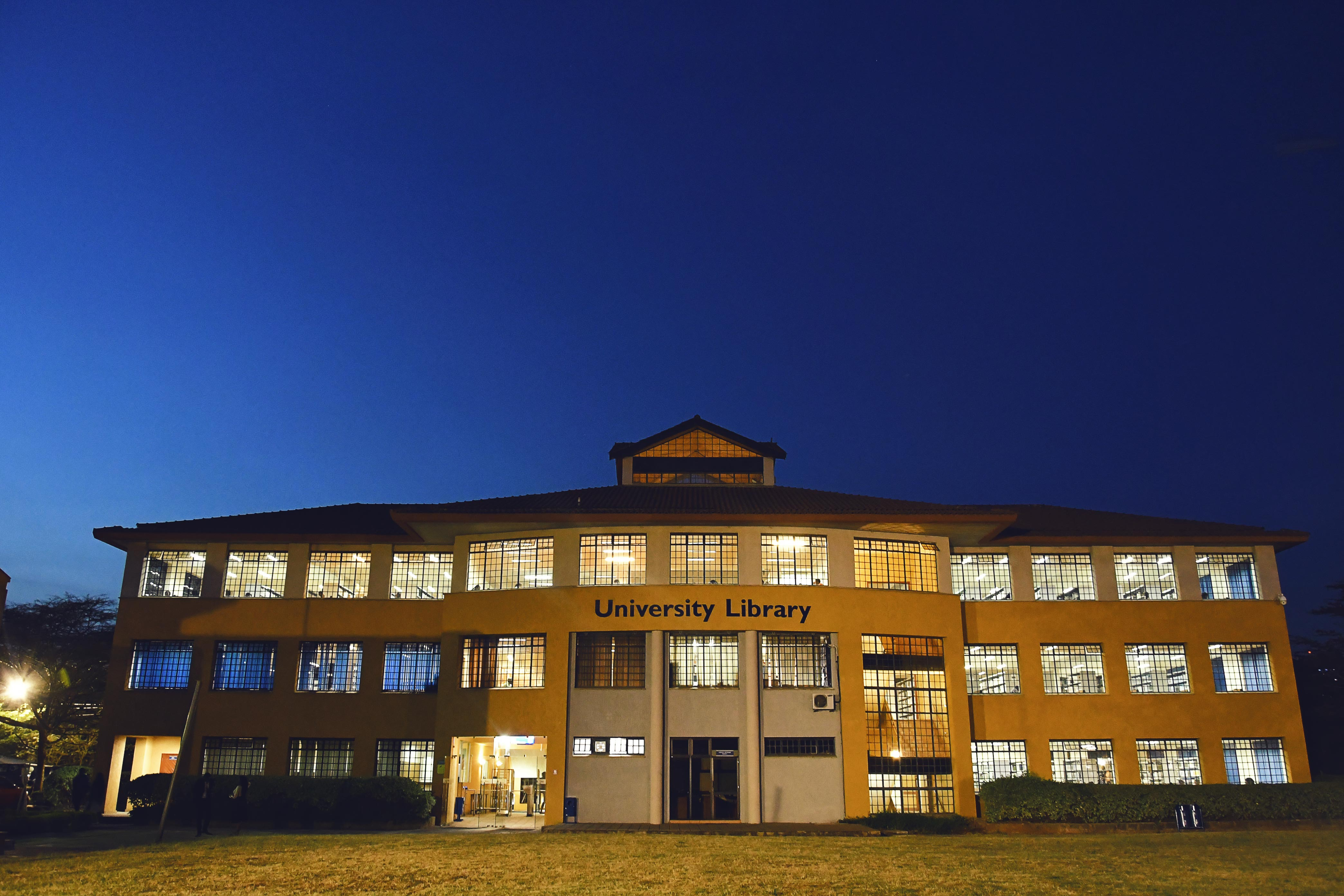
Strathmore University Library

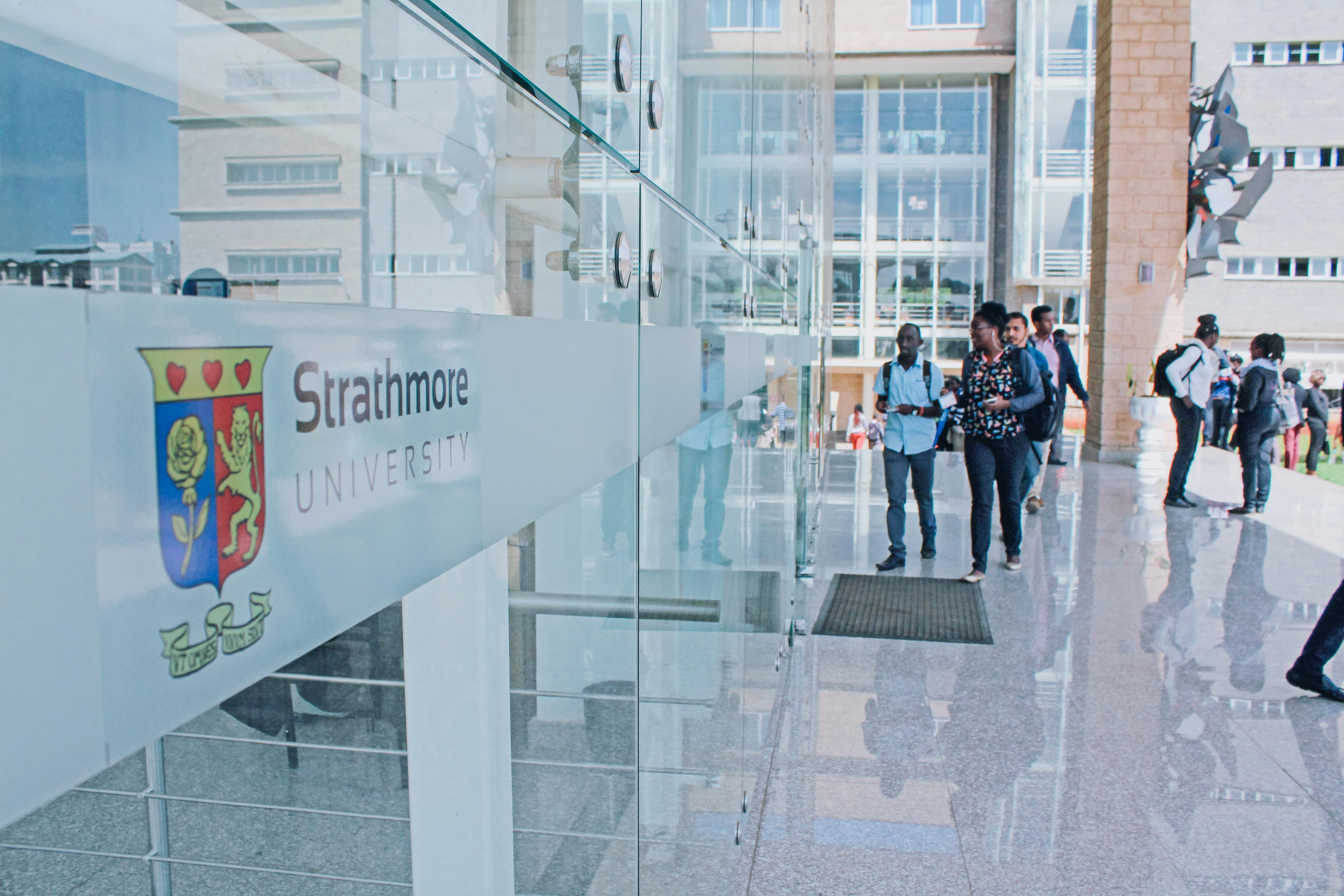
Strathmore University students

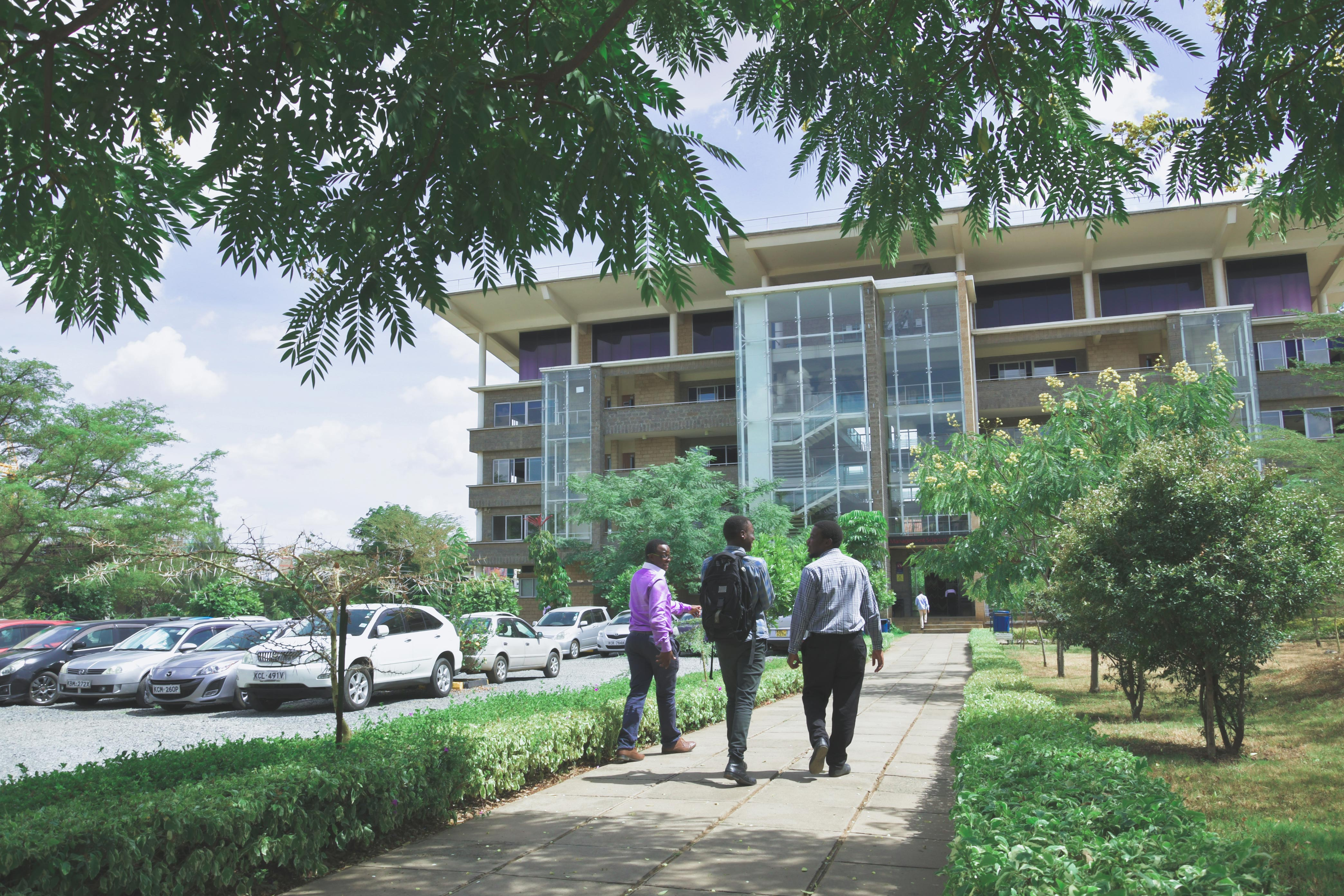
Strathmore University Management Science Building

Strathmore University is a chartered university based in Nairobi, Kenya.

== History ==
Strathmore College was started in 1961, as the first multi-racial, multi-religious advanced-level sixth form college offering science and arts subjects, by a group of professionals who formed a charitable educational trust (now the Strathmore Educational Trust). Saint Josemaría Escrivá, founder of Opus Dei, inspired and encouraged them to start the college.

In March 1966, the first intake of accountancy students, twenty-five in number, joined the Sixth-form students and began preparing for the examinations of the UK-based Association of Chartered Certified Accountants (ACCA). These first Accountancy students were sponsored by Shell East Africa, British American Tobacco Kenya and the East African Breweries. At this time Strathmore College was unique as a fully integrated post-Form 4 institution offering both academic and professional courses.

In October 1982, the college began evening courses in Accountancy after normal working hours, with 60 students sponsored by various companies.

In 1986, in response to a request by the trustees, the government of Kenya donated 5 acres (20,000 m^{2}) of land on Ole Sangale Road, Madaraka Estate. The European Union (EU) and the Italian government agreed to back the Madaraka Campus project. The donors wanted to support a co-educational college that would offer courses in Management and Accountancy, Kianda College, an undertaking of Kianda Foundation, which was planning new developments at the time. Derrick Mureithi agreed to run their professional courses in the new Madaraka campus.

Construction of the new campus commenced in September 1989. In January 1991, the Information Technology Centre was started in the Lavington, Nairobi Campus to run computer courses leading to the Institute for the Management of Information Systems (formerly Institute of Data Processing Management) Diploma and Higher Diploma. In January 1992 a Distance Learning Centre was opened to offer correspondence courses in Accountancy to students who are unable to attend lectures.

In January 1993, Strathmore College merged with Kianda College and moved to Ole Sangale Road, Madaraka Estate. In August 2002, the Commission of Higher Education awarded Strathmore a Letter of Interim Authority to operate as a university with a Faculty of Commerce and a Faculty of Information Technology. In 2008, Strathmore was awarded a charter to become a fully-fledged university. It also has since established Strathmore Business School, with academic linkage to various top business schools, including IESE and Harvard Business School.

== Strathmore University Foundation ==
Strathmore University Foundation is incorporated under Kenyan laws as a not-for-profit company limited by guarantee and having no share capital. It is wholly owned by Strathmore University and is entirely dedicated to raising funds to support university initiatives. The foundation is governed by a board of directors composed of persons of good standing in society. This board is appointed with the recommendation of the University Council and the University Management Board.

== Strathmore Alumni Relations Office ==
The Strathmore Alumni Relations Office is an international alumni office established in Kenya with the support of Strathmore University Foundation (Princeton, New Jersey, US) to promote and support alumni linkages and activities worldwide. The office is responsible for maintaining the links of alumni with the university.

Alumni include Brenda Wambui.

== Faculties, institutes and schools ==
=== Research centres ===
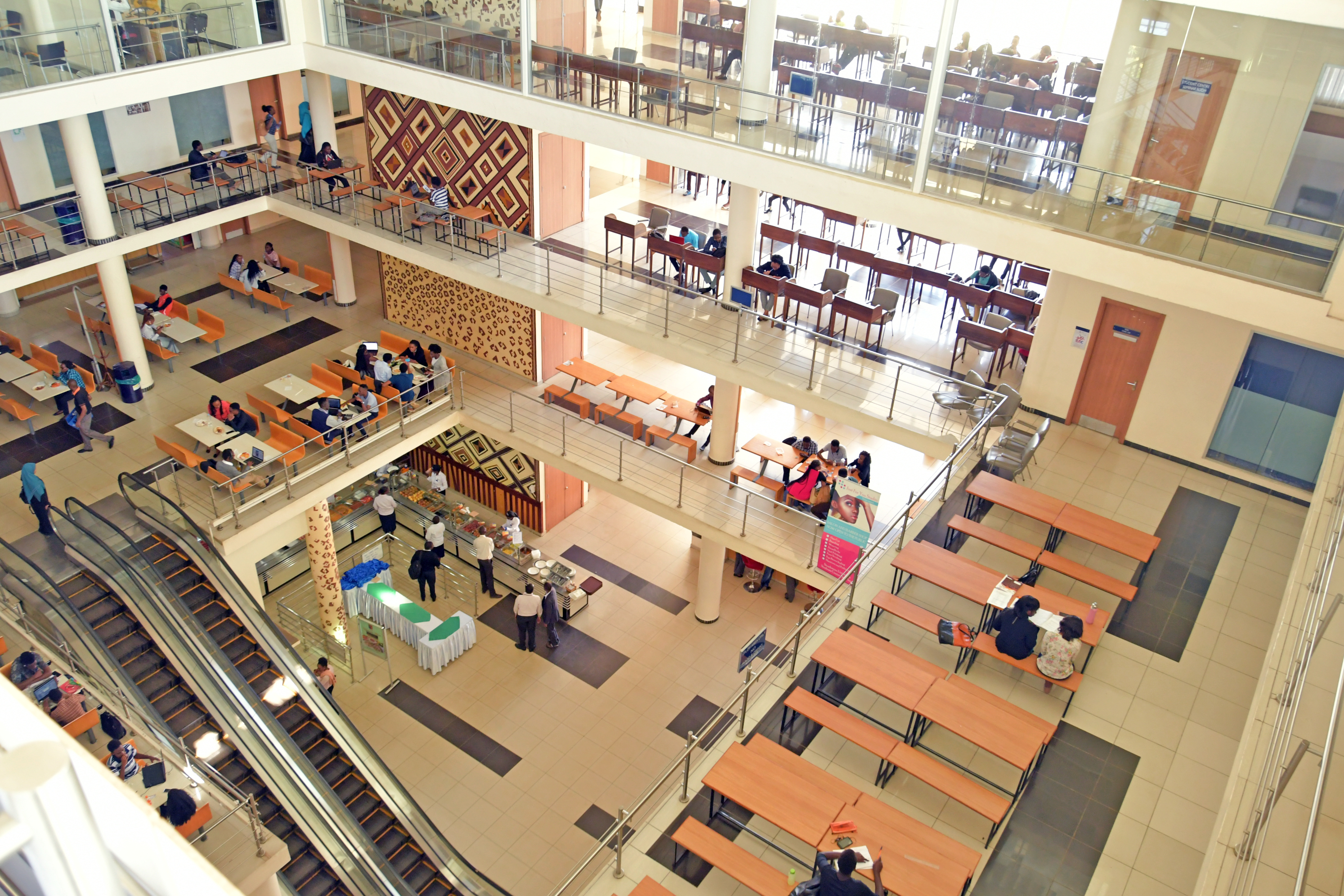
Strathmore University Student Centre

- Strathmore Africa Case Centre (SACC)
- @iLabAfrica Research and Innovation Centre
- The Strathmore Energy Research Centre (SERC)
- Centre for Research in Therapeutic Sciences (CREATES)
- Strathmore Dispute Resolution Centre (SDRC)
- Strathmore Tax Research Centre (STRC)
- Strathmore Extractives Industry Centre (SEIC)
- Centre for Intellectual Property and Information Technology Law (CIPIT)
- Strathmore Writing Centre
- Strathmore University Center for Sustainability Leadership
- Climate Innovation Centre Kenya
- Strathmore Research and Consultancy Centre (SRCC)

=== Schools, faculties and institutes ===
- Strathmore University Business School
- School of Law
- School of Graduate Studies
- School of Humanities and Social Sciences
- School of Computing and Engineering Sciences
- Institute of Mathematical Sciences
- Institute for Advanced Studies in International Criminal Justice

== Academic partnerships ==
- University of Navarra
- IESE Business School
- Wharton Business School
- University of Kigali
- AiTi at the Massachusetts Institute of Technology
- James Madison Programme on Ideals & Institutions at Princeton University
- Association of Micro Finance Institutions, Swiss Contact
- World Council of Credit Unions

== See also ==
- Kiva
- Université des Lagunes, university of Opus Dei in Ivory Coast
- List of universities in Kenya
- Education in Kenya
