= Haron Shakava =

Kenyan footballer (born 1992)

Harun Shakava
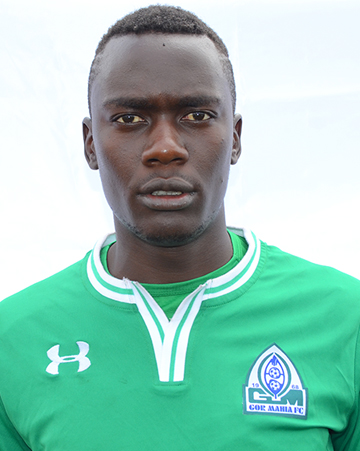

Personal information
- Full name: Harun Shakava
- Date of birth: 26 November 1992 (age 33)
- Place of birth: Kakamega, Kenya
- Height: 1.90 m (6 ft 3 in)
- Position: Centre-back

Senior career*
Years	Team	Apps	(Gls)
–2013	Kakamega Homeboyz		
2014–2019	Gor Mahia		
2019–2021	Nkana		
2021–2022	Gor Mahia		
2022–2024	Kenya Police		
2024	→ Nzoia Sugar (loan)		
2024–	Embakasi All Stars		

International career
2015–2017	Kenya	6	(1)
- * Club domestic league appearances and goals

Harun Shakava (born 26 November 1992) is a Kenyan professional footballer who plays as a centre-back. He has represented the Kenya national football team and is best known for his spells with Gor Mahia, where he served as club captain.

== Club career ==
Shakava began his senior career with Kakamega Homeboyz before joining Gor Mahia in 2014. He became a prominent member of the club's defence and later served as captain.

In 2019, Shakava left Gor Mahia to join Zambian club Nkana. He later returned to Gor Mahia and was named club captain.

In February 2022, Shakava left Gor Mahia and joined Kenya Police.

During the 2023–24 season, he joined Nzoia Sugar on loan from Kenya Police.

In October 2024, Shakava joined FKF Division Two side Embakasi All Stars.

== International career ==
Shakava made his debut for the Kenya national team on 4 July 2015, in a second-leg match of the 2016 African Nations Championship qualification against Ethiopia. The match ended in a 0–0 draw, with Kenya being eliminated after losing the first leg 2–0.

On 7 October 2015, Shakava scored for Kenya in a 5–2 victory against Mauritius in the first round of 2018 FIFA World Cup qualification.

=== International goals ===
Scores and results list Kenya's goal tally first.

No.	Date	Venue	Opponent	Score	Result	Competition
1	7 October 2015	Stade Anjalay, Belle Vue Maurel, Mauritius	Mauritius	3–0	5–2	2018 FIFA World Cup qualification

== Honours ==
Gor Mahia

- Kenyan Premier League: 2014
- Kenyan Super Cup: 2018
