= 2015 Nairobi City Stars season =

Kenyan football club season

Nairobi City Stars
2015 KPL season
- Owner: Peter Jabuya
- Chairman: Peter Jabuya
- Head coach: Dennis Okoth
- Stadium: Hope Centre
- Kenyan Premier League: 14th
- 2015 GOtv Shield: Round of 32
- Top goalscorer: League: Ebrimah Sanneh (11); All: Ebrimah Sanneh (15)
- Biggest win: 3-1 vs KCB FC, 18 Apr 2015, Kenyan Premier League, 6-0 vs Transfoc, 20 Jun 2015, GOtv Shield
- Biggest defeat: 3-0 vs Gor Mahia (H), 15 Apr 2015, GOtv Shield

The 2015 season was Nairobi City Stars' eleventh consecutive one in the top flight of Kenyan football.

The 2015 season was a turbulent one for Nairobi City Stars, both on and off the pitch. The club retained its place in the 2015 Kenyan Premier League despite having finished in the relegation zone during the 2014 season alongside Nakuru AllStars. The situation arose after the Football Kenya Federation controversially forwarded Shabana F.C. for promotion from the second tier National Super League, but the Kenyan Premier League rejected the move citing procedural irregularities and instead resolved to retain the 16 teams that had featured in the 2014 top-flight season.

The season began with Ugandan coach Paul Nkata, who took charge in January 2015 after succeeding Nigerian tactician Robinson Ndubuisi, who had departed at the end of the previous season. Nkata handled the team until midyear before assistant coach Gabriel Njoroge briefly took over between July and September 2015. Dennis Okoth later assumed charge for the remainder of the campaign on an interim basis and went on to secure safety for the club.

City Stars struggled throughout the season with inconsistency, financial constraints, and frequent technical bench changes, spending most of the campaign fighting relegation. However, the club survived relegation largely due to the contributions of two foreign players; Ugandan forward Jimmy Bageya and Gambian striker Ebrimah Sanneh who delivered crucial goals during the final stretch of the season. Bageya scored decisive lone goals in back-to-back 1-0 victories over KCB FC and Ushuru, results that revived the club's survival hopes.

In the final match of the season against SoNy Sugar, Sanneh scored a late equalizer that secured a 1–1 draw in City Stadium to confirm Nairobi City Stars’ top-flight status for another season. The dramatic escape ensured City Stars remained in the Kenyan Premier League for the 2016 season despite spending much of the campaign in the relegation places.

== Technical Bench ==
Position	Staff
Head coach	(Kenya) Dennis Okoth
First Assistant coach	(Kenya)
Goalkeeper coach	(Kenya)
Team manager	(Kenya) Neville Pudo
Team Physio	(Kenya) Dennis Mugisha
Kit Manager	(Kenya) Joseph Andere

Source: Nairobi City Stars

== Players ==
=== Squad information ===
Players and squad numbers last updated on 19 May 2024. Appearances include all competitions.
Note: Flags indicate national team as has been defined under FIFA eligibility rules. Players only hold one non-FIFA nationality.

No.	Player	Nat.	Positions	Signed in	Contract ends	Signed from	Apps.	Goals
Goalkeepers
1	Ronny Kagunzi	(Kenya)	GK	2015	2015	(Kenya) SoNy Sugar	20	0
13	Victor Odhiambo	(Kenya)	GK	2015	2015	(Kenya) Posta Rangers	3	0
23	Gradus Ochieng	(Kenya)	GK	2015	2015	Unattached	4	0
30	Richard Oyola	(Kenya)	GK	2015	2015		0	0
Defenders
2	Jackton Opanda	(Kenya)	DF	2015	2015		17	0
3	Fred Nkata	(Uganda)	CB	2015	2015	(Uganda) Kiira Young	6	0
4	Luis Masika	(Kenya)	CB	2015	2015	Unattached	19	0
8	Calvin Masawa	(Kenya)	LB / RB	2011	2015	Contract Renewal	27	1
15	William Kijjwa	(Uganda)	DF	2015	2015		5	0
16	Ismail Mugambi	(Kenya)	DF	2015	2015		0	0
18	Arthur Museve (1st ass. captain)	(Kenya)	CB	2008	2015	(Kenya) Securicor FC	18	0
21	Celestine Imwene	(Kenya)	DF	2008	2015	Contract renewal	10	1
24	Elias Otieno	(Kenya)	DF	2014	2015	Contract renewal	1	0
27	John Amboko	(Kenya)	CB	2015	2015	Contract Renewal	26	2
28	Amani Omondi	(Kenya)	DF	2015	2015	Unattached	2	0
Midfielders
	Ivan Odhiambo	(Kenya)	CM	2015	2015	Unattached	0	0
5	Thomas Mwaura	(Kenya)	CM	2015	2015		0	0
6	Samuel Gicheru	(Kenya)	CM	2015	2015	Unattached	0	0
10	Peter Musiime	(Uganda)	CM / DM	2015	2015	Unattached	12	0
11	Oscar Mbugua (Overall captain)	(Kenya)	AM	2014	2015	Gor Mahia	28	2
12	Bruno Sserunkuma	(Uganda)	MF	2015	2015		23	1
17	Samuel Wailler	(Kenya)	CM / DM	2015	2015	Contract renewal	13	0
19	Stephen Khauka	(Kenya)	MF	2015	2015		1	0
20	Oscar Kadenge	(Kenya)	FW	2015	2015	(Kenya) AFC Leopards	5	0
22	Nicholas Kamau	(Kenya)	FW	2015	2015	(Kenya) Dandora All Stars	11	0
25	Yusuf Suf Owino	(Kenya)	AM	2015	2015	Unattached	8	0
29	Elisha Rumwanyo	(Kenya)	CM / AM	2015	2015	Unattached	8	0
Forwards
7	Robert Ndung'u	(Kenya)	FW	2015	2015	(Kenya) Vapor Sports	0	2
9	Ebrimah Sanneh	(The Gambia)	FW	2014	2015	(The Gambia) Real de Banjul	25	15
13	Victor Omondi	(Kenya)	FW	2015	2015	(Kenya) Chemelil Sugar	3	0
14	Levy Muaka	(Kenya)	FW	2012	2015	(Kenya) Tusker FC	19	0
19	Paul Karuri	(Kenya)	ST	2015	2015	(Kenya) Mathare United	8	0
20	Ismael Kabugu	(Uganda)	FW	2014	2015	(Uganda) Proline FC	5	0
26	Joseph Sakwa	(Kenya)	ST	2008	2015	Contract renewal	23	3
50	Jimmy Bageya	(Uganda)	ST	2015	2015	(Kenya) Nakumatt FC	12	4
Players who left the club
No.	Player	Nat.	Positions	Signed in	Contract ends	Signed to	Apps.	Goals
3	Patrick Ngige	(Kenya)	DF	2015	2015	(Kenya) Posta Rangers	0	0
15	Wicklif Owino	(Kenya)	CM	2015	2015		3	0
20	Fredrick Majani	(Kenya)	GK	2009	2015	(Kenya) Shabana	0	0
25	Dan Makori	(Kenya)	DF	2015	2015	(Kenya) Ushuru	9	0
40	Musa Asad	(South Sudan)	MF	2015	2015	(Kenya) Thika United	13	0

Source: GSA

== Off season transfers ==
=== In ===
Date	Pos.	Player	From	Ref.
1 Mar 2015	GK	(Kenya) Ronny Kagunzi	(Kenya) SoNy Sugar	
1 Mar 2015	GK	(Kenya) Gradus Ochieng		
1 Mar 2015	GK	(Kenya) Richard Oyona		
1 Mar 2015	ST	(Kenya) Dan Makori	(Kenya) Bidco United	
1 Mar 2015	MF	(Kenya) Wicklif Owino		
1 Mar 2015	DM	(Kenya) Jackton Opanda		
1 Mar 2015	DM	(Kenya) Stephen Khauka		
1 Mar 2015	ST	(Kenya) Joseph Sakwa		
1 Mar 2015	CM	(Kenya) Thomas Mwaura		
1 Mar 2015	DF	(Kenya) Elias Otieno		
1 Mar 2015	DF	(Kenya) Amani Omondi	Unattached	
1 Mar 2015	MF	(Uganda) Peter Musiime	Unattached	
1 Mar 2015	MF	(Kenya) Samuel Wailler		
1 Mar 2015	MF	(Kenya) Samson Gicheru		

=== Out ===
Date	Pos.	Player	To	Ref.
1 Feb 2015	MF	(Uganda) Lawrence Kasadha	(Kenya) Bandari	
1 Feb 2015	ST	(Uganda) George Abege	(Kenya) Bandari	
1 Feb 2015	ST	(Kenya) Kevin Oliech	(Kenya) Thika United	
1 Feb 2015	ST	(Kenya) Raymond Omondi	(Kenya) Thika United	
1 Feb 2015	DF	(Kenya) Collins Okumu	(Kenya) Thika United	
1 Feb 2015	MF	(Nigeria) Nelson Marasowe	(Kenya) Ushuru	
1 Feb 2015	DF	(Kenya) David Otieno	(Kenya) Ushuru	
1 Feb 2015	DF	(Kenya) Andrew Ongwae	(Kenya) Shabana	
1 Feb 2015	MF	(Uganda) Joseph Kayiira	(Uganda) SC Victoria University	
1 Feb 2015	ST	(Kenya) George Midenyo	(Ethiopia) Sidama Coffee	
1 Feb 2015	RB	(Kenya) Evans Chief Njuguna	(Kenya) Ligi Ndogo	
1 Feb 2015	MF	(Kenya) Moses Otieno	(Kenya) Nakumatt FC	
1 Feb 2015	GK	(Kenya) Kevin Omondi	(Kenya) SoNy Sugar	
1 Feb 2015	DM	(Kenya) Dennis Okoth	Retired	
1 Feb 2015	GK	(Kenya) Fredrick Majani	(Kenya) Shabana	
1 Feb 2015	GK	(Kenya) Michael Juma		
1 Feb 2015	MF	(Kenya) Timothy Kaimenyi		
1 Feb 2015	DF	(Kenya) Mike Simiyu		

=== In ===
Date	Pos.	Player	From	Ref.
2 July 2015	ST	(Kenya) Oscar Kadenge	(Kenya) AFC Leopards	
2 July 2015	ST	(Kenya) Paul Karuri	(Kenya) Mathare United	
2 July 2015	ST	(Uganda) Jimmy Bageya	(Kenya) Nakumatt FC	
2 July 2015	LB	(Uganda) Fred Nkata	(Uganda) Kiira Young (loan)	
2 July 2015	MF	(Uganda) William Kijjwa	Unattached	
2 July 2015	MF	(Kenya) Ivan Odhiambo	Unattached	
2 July 2015	MF	(Kenya) Yusuf Suf Owino	Unattached	

=== Out ===
Date	Pos.	Player	From	Ref.
30 Jun 2015	MF	(South Sudan) Musa Asad	(Kenya) Thika United	
30 Jun 2015	ST	(Kenya) Dan Makori	(Kenya) Ushuru	
30 Jun 2015	MF	(Kenya) Wicklif Owino		
30 Jun 2015	DF	(Kenya) Patrick Ngige		

== Competitions ==
=== Overall record ===
Competition	First match	Last match	Starting round	Final position	Record							
Competition	First match	Last match	Starting round	Final position	Pld	W	D	L	GF	GA	GD	Win %
2015 KPL	21 Mar 2015	1 Nov 2015	Matchday 1	14th	30	6	10	14	25	37	−12	20.00
2015 GOtv Shield	20 Jun 2015	20 Sep 2015	Round of 64	Round of 32	2	1	0	1	7	1	+6	50.00
Total					32	7	10	15	32	38	−6	21.88

Source: rsssf

=== Premier League ===
==== Results summary ====
Overall								Home						Away					
Pld	W	D	L	GF	GA	GD	Pts	W	D	L	GF	GA	GD	W	D	L	GF	GA	GD
30	6	10	14	25	37	−12	28	2	6	8	13	21	−8	4	4	6	12	16	−4

Source: Soccerway

==== Results by round ====
Round	1	2	3	4	5	6	7	8	9	10	11	12	13	14	15	16	17	18	19	20	21	22	23	24	25	26	27	28	29	30
Ground	H	A	H	H	A	A	H	A	A	H	A	H	A	H	A	H	A	H	A	H	A	H	A	A	H	A	A	H	A	H
Result	L	L	L	L	L	D	L	W	L	D	D	D	D	D	W	L	D	L	L	D	L	W	L	W	L	D	L	W	W	D
Position	15	14	15	15	16	16	16	15	15	15	15	15	15	15	14	15	15	15	15	15	15	15	15	15	15	15	15	15	14	14
Points	0	0	0	0	0	1	1	4	4	5	6	7	8	9	12	12	13	13	13	14	14	17	17	20	20	21	21	24	27	28

Source: Soccerway
A = Away; H = Home; W = Win; D = Draw; L = Loss; P = Postponed

==== Score overview ====
Win Draw Loss

Opposition	Home score	Away score	Aggregate score	Double
AFC Leopards	0–1	1-2	1-3	No
Bandari	0–1	1-2	1-3	No
Chemelil Sugar	1-1	1-1	2-2	No
Gor Mahia	0–3	1-3	1-6	No
KCB	1-0	3-1	4-1	Yes
Mathare United	2-0	0-2	2-2	No
Muhoroni Youth	1–2	0-0	1–2	No
Nakuru All Stars	1-1	1-1	2-2	No
Sofapaka	0-0	0–2	0–2	No
SoNy Sugar	1-1	1-0	2-1	No
Thika United	2-2	0-1	2-3	No
Tusker	1-2	1-0	2-2	No
Ulinzi Stars	0-2	1-1	1-3	No
Ushuru	1-1	1-0	2-1	No
Western Stima	1-2	1-2	2-4	No

Source: Soccerway

==== Matches ====
Win Draw Loss Fixtures

The league officially kicked off on the 13 February 2016 with a number of games on the cards.

21 March 2015 1	Nairobi City Stars	0-1	AFC Leopards	Nairobi
15:00 UTC+3	Amani (yellow card) 13'; Masawa (yellow card) 56'	Report	Ngama (yellow card) 15'; Keli 79'	Stadium: City Stadium

25 March 2015 2	Western Stima	2-1	Nairobi City Stars	Kisumu
15:00 UTC+3	Mauda 40', 47'; Oketch (red card) 44'	Report	Makori 41'	Stadium: Moi Stadium

29 March 2015 3	Nairobi City Stars	1-2	Tusker	Nairobi
15:00 UTC+3	Mbugua (yellow card) 40'; Sakwa 69'	Report	Were 3', 37'; Shikalo (yellow card) 80'	Stadium: Nyayo Stadium

1 April 2015 4	Nairobi City Stars	0-1	Bandari	Nairobi
15:00 UTC+3		Report	Muki 11'; Gateri (yellow card) 60'	Stadium: City Stadium

5 April 2015 5	Mathare United	2-0	Nairobi City Stars	Nairobi
15:00 UTC+3	Mwendwa 19'; Mwaura (yellow card) 60'; Kamura 85'	Report		Stadium: Nyayo Stadium

5 April 2015 6	Chemelil Sugar	1-1	Nairobi City Stars	Chemelil
15:00 UTC+3	Odero 19' (pen.); Ojuang (yellow card) 26'; Onkangi (yellow card) 36'; Indimuli (yellow card) 46'	Report	Sakwa (yellow card) 44'; Sserunkuma 56'	Stadium: Chemelil Complex

15 April 2015 7	Nairobi City Stars	0-3	Gor Mahia	Nairobi
15:00 UTC+3	Imwene (yellow card) 30'; Onjala (yellow card) 76'	Report	Abondo 4'; Olunga 45'; Kagere 70'	Stadium: City Stadium

18 April 2015 8	KCB FC	1-3	Nairobi City Stars	Nairobi
15:00 UTC+3	Murugi 30' 59'; Majid (yellow card) 52'; Mwangi (yellow card) 54'; Majid (yellow card) 52'	Report	Mbugua 29'; Sanneh 70' (pen.), 83'	Stadium: City Stadium

26 April 2015 9	Thika United	1-0	Nairobi City Stars	Thika
15:00 UTC+3	Macharia 11' (yellow card) 67'	Report	Sserunkuma (yellow card) 72'; Rumwanyo (yellow card) 72'; Amboko (yellow card) 75'	Stadium: Thika Stadium

2 May 2015 10	Nairobi City Stars	0-0	Sofapaka	Thika
15:00 UTC+3	Masawa (yellow card) 52'	Report	Shivachi (yellow card) 90'	Stadium: Thika Stadium

9 May 2015 11	Muhoroni Youth	0-0	Nairobi City Stars	Muhoroni
15:00 UTC+3		Report	Masawa (yellow card) 47'; Kagunzi (yellow card) 49'	Stadium: Muhoroni Stadium

16 May 2015 12	Nairobi City Stars	1-1	Ushuru	Nairobi
15:00 UTC+3	Masika 42'; Sserunkuma 60'	Report	Hassan 21'; Marasowe (yellow card) 81'	Stadium: Nyayo Stadium

23 May 2015 13	Ulinzi Stars FC	1-1	Nairobi City Stars	Nakuru
15:00 UTC+3	Wamalwa 37'; Rutto (yellow card) 60'	Report	Mbugua 63'	Stadium: Afraha Stadium

30 May 2015 14	Nairobi City Stars	1-1	Nakuru All Stars	Nairobi
15:00 UTC+3	Sserunkuma (yellow card) 44'; Mbugua 47' (pen.)	Report	Seda (yellow card) 18'; Maina 36'; Muchiri (yellow card) 52'; Balala (yellow card) 79'	Stadium: Nyayo Stadium

6 June 2015 15	SoNy Sugar	0-1	Nairobi City Stars	Awendo
15:00 UTC+3		Report	Sanneh 22'	Stadium: Green Stadium

27 June 2015 16	Nairobi City Stars	1-2	Muhoroni Youth	Awendo
15:00 UTC+3	Sanneh 90+2' (pen.)	Report	Mandela 4', 48'	Stadium: Ruaraka Stadium

27 June 2015 17	Nakuru All Stars	1-1	Nairobi City Stars	Nakuru
15:00 UTC+3	Bebeto 59'	Report	Sakwa 35'	Stadium: Afraha Stadium

12 July 2015 18	Nairobi City Stars	0-2	Ulinzi Stars	Nairobi
15:00 UTC+3		Report	Wamalwa 40'; Muloma (yellow card) 47'; Mbongi (yellow card) 55'; Kokoyo 77'	Stadium: Ruaraka Stadium

19 July 2015 19	AFC Leopards	2-1	Nairobi City Stars	Nairobi
15:00 UTC+3	Saleh (yellow card) 27'; Otieno (yellow card) 33'; Mang'oli 65', 84'	Report	Mbugua 23'; Amboko (yellow card) 89'	Stadium: Nyayo Stadium

26 July 2015 20	Nairobi City Stars	1-1	Chemelil	Machakos
15:00 UTC+3	Ndung'u 5' (yellow card) 49'; Nkata (yellow card) 45'	Report	Mbugua (yellow card) 14'; Mutahi 22'; Ojuang (yellow card) 60'	Stadium: Kenyatta Stadium

3 August 2015 21	Sofapaka FC	2-0	Nairobi City Stars	Machakos
15:00 UTC+3	Shivachi 12'; Matiye 35'	Report	Bageya (yellow card) 79'	Stadium: Kenyatta Stadium

7 August 2015 22	Nairobi City Stars	2-0	Mathare United	Nairobi
15:00 UTC+3	Museve (yellow card) 33'; Sanneh 40'; Nkata (yellow card) 79'; Bageya 86'; Odhiambo (yellow card) 90'	Report	Seda (yellow card) 17'	Stadium: Nyayo Stadium

15 August 2015 23	Gor Mahia	3-1	Nairobi City Stars	Nairobi
15:00 UTC+3	Kagere 28'; Olunga 45+3', 61' (pen.)	Report	Bageya 89'	Stadium: Nyayo Stadium

21 August 2015 24	Tusker	0-1	Nairobi City Stars	Nairobi
15:00 UTC+3	Cheche (red card) 35'	Report	Sanneh 42'	Stadium: Nyayo Stadium

28 August 2015 25	Nairobi City Stars	1-2	Western Stima	Nairobi
15:00 UTC+3	Sanneh 7' (pen.); Nkata (yellow card) 59'	Report	Kemboi 73'; Oketch 79'	Stadium: Nyayo Stadium

11 September 2015 26	Nairobi City Stars	2-2	Thika United	Nairobi
15:00 UTC+3	Sanneh 78', 85'; Onjala (yellow card) 81'	Report	Omumbo 32' (pen.); Mwinyi 75'; Otieno (yellow card) 75'	Stadium: City Stadium

3 October 2015 27	Bandari	2-1	Nairobi City Stars	Mombasa
15:00 UTC+3	Muki 34'; King'atua 82'	Report	Sanneh 72'; Suf (yellow card) 62' (yellow-red card) 77'	Stadium: Mombasa Stadium

18 October 2015 28	Nairobi City Stars	1-0	KCB FC	Nairobi
15:00 UTC+3	Bageya 74'; Sakwa (yellow card) 71' (yellow-red card) 90'	Report		Stadium: Kasarani Stadium

24 October 2015 29	Ushuru	1-0	Nairobi City Stars	Nairobi
15:00 UTC+3	Shikokoti (yellow card) 43' (yellow-red card) 61'	Report	Bageya 72'	Stadium: Ruaraka Stadium

1 November 2015 30	Nairobi City Stars	1-1	SoNy Sugar	Nairobi
15:00 UTC+3	Asembeka 28'; Kwizera (yellow card) 28'	Report	Sanneh (yellow card) 15' (goal) 50'; Bageya (yellow card) 23'	Stadium: Ruaraka Stadium

Source: Soccerway

=== GOtv Shield ===
Win Draw Loss Fixtures

20 Jun 2015 Round of 64	Nairobi City Stars	6-0	Transfoc	Nairobi
15:00 UTC+3	Sanneh 13', 30', 50', 87'; Amboko 18' (pen.), 62'	Report	Bageya 54'; Odera 65'	Stadium: Kasarani

20 Sep 2015 Round of 32	Nakumatt FC	1(4)-1(2)	Nairobi City Stars	Nairobi
15:00 UTC+3	Onyango 36'	Report	Imwene 69'	Stadium: Rauraka Stadium

== Statistics ==
=== Goalscorers ===
No.	Pos.	Player	Premier League	GOtv Shield	Total
9	ST	(The Gambia) Ebrimah Sanneh	11	4	15
50	FW	(Uganda) Jimmy Bageya	4	0	4
26	FW	(Kenya) Joseph Sakwa	3	0	3
7	FW	(Kenya) Robert Ndung'u	2	0	2
11	AM	(Kenya) Oscar Mbugua	2	0	2
27	DF	(Kenya) John Amboko	0	2	2
8	DF	(Kenya) Calvin Masawa	1	0	1
12	FW	(Uganda) Bruno Sserunkuma	1	0	1
21	DF	(Kenya) Celestine Imwene	0	1	1
25	FW	(Kenya) Dan Makori	1	0	1
Own goals			0	0	0
Totals			25	7	32

Source: Soccerway

=== Top Assists ===
No.	Pos.	Player	Premier League	GOtv Shield	Total
8	DF	(Kenya) Calvin Masawa	4	0	4
11	AM	(Kenya) Oscar Mbugua	4	0	4
9	FW	(The Gambia) Ebrimah Sanneh	1	1	2
14	FW	(Kenya) Levy Muaka	2	0	2
26	ST	(Kenya) Joseph Sakwa	1	1	2
7	FW	(Kenya) Robert Ndungu	0	1	0
11	MF	(Uganda) Peter Musiime	1	0	1
17	MF	(Kenya) Samuel Wailler	0	1	1
18	DF	(Kenya) Arthur Museve	1	0	1
22	MF	(Kenya) Nicholas Kamau	1	0	1
25	MF	(Kenya) Yusuf Suf Owino	1	0	1
27	DF	(Kenya) John Amboko	1	0	1
40	DM	(South Sudan) Musa Asad	1	0	1
Opponent			3	1	3
Missing			4	2	5
Totals			25	7	32

=== Discipline ===
No.	Pos.	Player	Premier League			GOtv Shield			Total		
No.	Pos.	Player	Booked	(yellow card) (yellow-red card)	Sent off (straight red)	Booked	(yellow card) (yellow-red card)	Sent off (straight red)	Booked	(yellow card) (yellow-red card)	Sent off (straight red)
1	GK	(Kenya) Ronny Kagunzi	1	0	0	0	0	0	1	0	0
2	CB	(Kenya) Jackton Opanda	2	0	0	0	0	0	2	0	0
3	LB	(Uganda) Fred Nkata	3	0	0	0	0	0	3	0	0
4	CB	(Uganda) Luis Masika	0	0	0	0	0	0	0	0	0
5	CM	(Kenya) Thomas Mwaura	0	0	0	0	0	0	0	0	0
6	CM	(Kenya) Samuel Gicheru	0	0	0	0	0	0	0	0	0
7	FW	(Kenya) Robert Ndung'u	1	0	0	0	0	0	1	0	0
8	DF	(Kenya) Calvin Masawa	3	0	0	0	0	0	3	0	0
9	ST	(The Gambia) Ebrimah Sanneh	1	0	0	0	0	0	1	0	0
10	CM	(Kenya) Peter Musiime	0	0	0	0	0	0	0	0	0
11	DF	(Kenya) Oscar Mbugua	1	0	0	0	0	0	1	0	0
12	FW	(Uganda) Bruno Sserunkuma	2	0	0	0	0	0	2	0	0
13	GK	(Kenya) Victor Odhiambo	1	0	0	0	0	0	1	0	0
14	FW	(Kenya) Levy Muaka	0	0	0	0	0	0	0	0	0
15	DF	(Uganda) William Kijjwa	0	0	0	0	0	0	0	0	0
16	DF	(Kenya) Ismail Mugambi	0	0	0	0	0	0	0	0	0
17	MF	(Kenya) Samuel Wailler	0	0	0	0	0	0	0	0	0
18	DF	(Kenya) Arthur Museve	1	0	0	0	0	0	1	0	0
19	MF	(Kenya) Stephen Khauka	0	0	0	0	0	0	0	0	0
20	FW	(Kenya) Oscar Kadenge	0	0	0	0	0	0	0	0	0
21	DF	(Kenya) Celestine Imwene	1	0	0	0	0	0	1	0	0
22	FW	(Kenya) Nicholas Kamau	0	0	0	0	0	0	0	0	0
23	GK	(Kenya) Gradus Ochieng	0	0	0	0	0	0	0	0	0
24	DF	(Kenya) Elias Otieno	0	0	0	0	0	0	0	0	0
25	MF	(Kenya) Yusuf Suf Owino	0	2	1	0	0	0	0	2	1
26	MF	(Kenya) Joseph Sakwa	1	2	1	0	0	0	1	2	1
27	CB	(Kenya) John Amboko	1	0	0	0	0	0	1	0	0
28	DF	(Kenya) Amani Omondi	1	0	0	0	0	0	1	0	0
29	MF	(Kenya) Elisha Rumwanyo	1	0	0	0	0	0	1	0	0
30	GK	(Kenya) Richard Oyola	0	0	0	0	0	0	0	0	0
50	ST	(Uganda) Jimmy Bageya	2	0	0	0	0	0	2	0	0
Players who left the club
3	DF	(Kenya) Patrick Ngige	0	0	0	0	0	0	0	0	0
15	CM	(Kenya) Wicklif Owino	0	0	0	0	0	0	0	0	0
20	GK	(Kenya) Fredrick Majani	0	0	0	0	0	0	0	0	0
25	ST	(Kenya) Dan Makori	0	0	0	0	0	0	0	0	0
40	MF	(South Sudan) Saad Musa	0	0	0	0	0	0	0	0	0
Totals			23	4	2	0	0	0	23	4	2

Source: Soccerway

== Awards ==
=== Players ===
No.	Pos.	Player	Award	Source
50	ST	(Uganda) Jimmy Bageya	Oct 2015 Player for the month	
9	ST	(The Gambia) Ebrimah Sanneh	2015 Young Player of the Year - 1st runners-up	

=== Technical Bench ===
No.	Pos.	Player	Award	Source
		(Kenya) Neville Pudo	2015 Team Manager of the Year - 4th place	
