= 2016 Nairobi City Stars season =

Kenyan football club season

Nairobi City Stars
2016 KPL season
- Owner: Peter Jabuya
- Chairman: Peter Jabuya
- Head coach: Richard Pinto Tamale
- Stadium: Hope Centre
- Kenyan Premier League: 16th
- Top goalscorer: League: Ezekiel Odera (4); All: Ezekiel Odera (5)
- Biggest win: 1-3 vs Bandari, 29 Sep 2016, Kenyan Premier League
- Biggest defeat: 5-0 vs Sofapaka (A), 7 Aug 2016, Kenyan Premier League

The 2016 season was Nairobi City Stars' 12th season in the top flight of Kenyan football.

The 2016 season was a difficult campaign for Nairobi City Stars as the club was relegated from the Kenyan Premier League after 12 straight season in Kenya's elite league after finishing bottom of the table with 19 points from 30 matches. The team managed only three wins all season and scored just 17 goals, the lowest tally in the league.

The season was overseen by two coaches in either legs. Former Kenyan international and legend John “Bobby” Ogolla, who joined in early 2016, handled the team during the first half of the campaign before Ugandan coach Richard Pinto Tamale took charge in mid-2016. However, City Stars continued to struggle for consistency and goals throughout the season.

The team's relegation was confirmed on 30 October 2016 following a 3–1 loss to Kakamega Homeboyz at Kasarani Stadium. Goals from David Okoth, Hedmond Mauda and Ali Bhai condemned the Nairobi side to the second tier after 12 consecutive seasons in the top flight. City Stars’ consolation goal was scored by Gambian forward Pa Jassey Mulie.

== Technical Bench ==
Position	Staff
Head coach	(Uganda) Richard Pinto Tamale
First Assistant coach	(Kenya) Dennis Okoth
Goalkeeper coach	(Kenya)
Team manager	(Kenya) Neville Pudo
Team Physio	(Kenya) Dennis Mugisha
Kit Manager	(Kenya) Joseph Andere

Source: Nairobi City Stars

== Players ==
=== Squad information ===
Players and squad numbers last updated on 19 May 2024. Appearances include all competitions.
Note: Flags indicate national team as has been defined under FIFA eligibility rules. Players only hold one non-FIFA nationality.

No.	Player	Nat.	Positions	Signed in	Contract ends	Signed from	Apps.	Goals
Goalkeepers
13	Victor Odhiambo	(Kenya)	GK	2015	2016	(Kenya) Posta Rangers	13	0
20	Fredrick Majani	(Kenya)	GK	2015	2016	(Kenya) Shabana	2	0
20	Geoffrey Angoya	(Kenya)	GK	2015	2016	(Kenya) Mathare United (loan)	0	0
30	Ronny Kagunzi	(Kenya)	GK	2015	2016	Contract Renewal	16	0
Defenders
	Kevin Okumu	(Kenya)	RB / RW	2016	2016	(Kenya) Young Rovers	0	0
4	Luis Masika	(Kenya)	CB	2015	2016	Contract Renewal	13	0
5	Franklyne Osama	(Kenya)	CB	2016	2016	(Kenya) Muhoroni Youth	14	0
6	Kelvin Odhiambo	(Kenya)	CB	2015	2016		1	0
8	Calvin Masawa	(Kenya)	LB / RB	2011	2016	Contract Renewal	30	0
16	Davies Ikocheli	(Kenya)	CB	2016	2016	(Kenya) Ushuru	6	0
18	Arthur Museve	(Kenya)	CB	2015	2016	Contract Renewal	24	0
24	Simon Ogutu	(Kenya)	CB	2016	2016	(Kenya) Vaport Sports	8	0
27	John Amboko	(Kenya)	CB	2015	2016	Contract Renewal	29	0
Midfielders
	Reuben Munyao	(Kenya)	CM / AM	2016	2016	(Kenya) Nakumatt FC	0	0
	Hamisi Kyatelekera	(Uganda)	CM	2016	2016	(Kenya) Nairobi Stima	0	0
2	Jacob Onyango	(Kenya)	CM / AM	2016	2016	(Kenya) Nakumatt FC (loan)	12	0
3	Mustafa Umaru Suma	(Sierra Leone)	CM	2016	2016	(Bangladesh) Krira Chakra	10	0
10	Peter Musiime	(Uganda)	CM / DM	2015	2016	Contract Renewal	13	0
14	Ezra Matsiko	(Uganda)	CM	2016	2016	(Uganda) Artland Katale	1	0
15	Peter Wainaina	(Kenya)	CM / AM	2015	2016	(Kenya) Mathare United	21	0
17	Samuel Wailler	(Kenya)	CM / DM	2015	2016	Contract renewal	1	0
21	Oliver Maloba	(Kenya)	AM	2016	2016	(Kenya) Vapor Sports	23	2
22	Festo Omukoto	(Kenya)	CM / DM	2016	2016	Free agent	14	0
28	Idd Shikanda	(Kenya)	DM	2016	2016	(Kenya) Shabana FC	8	0
29	Maurice Odhiambo	(Kenya)	CM / AM	2016	2016	(Kenya) Nakuru AllStars	5	0
Forwards
7	Robert Ndung'u	(Kenya)	FW	2015	2016	(Kenya) Vapor Sports	12	2
16	Jassey Pa Mulie	(The Gambia)	ST	2016	2016	(The Gambia) Real de Banjul	3	1
19	Manase Ojwang Orao	(Kenya)	ST	2016	2016	Free agent	6	0
23	Ezekiel Odera	(Kenya)	ST	2016	2016	(Kenya) Sofapaka FC	24	5
26	Joseph Sakwa	(Kenya)	ST	2015	2016	Contract Renewal	9	0
40	Benson Iregi	(Kenya)	FW	2015	2016	(Kenya) Inter City FC (loan)	17	2
50	Jimmy Bageya	(Uganda)	ST	2015	2016	(Kenya) Bandari	22	4
Players who left the club
No.	Player	Nat.	Positions	Signed in	Contract ends	Signed to	Apps.	Goals
	Samson Otieno	(Kenya)	DF	2016	2016	(Kenya) Sofapaka FC	0	0
5	Joshua Mawira	(Kenya)	DF	2016	2016	(Kenya) AFC Leopards	11	0
9	Daniel Otieno	(Kenya)	FW	2016	2016	(Kenya) Muhoroni Youth	7	0
11	Oscar Mbugua	(Kenya)	AM	2015	2016	(Kenya) Ushuru	15	3
20	Fredrick Majani	(Kenya)	GK	2015	2016	(Kenya) Shabana	2	0
22	Joel Tata	(Cameroon)	ST	2016	2016	(Kenya) Thika United	11	1
25	Yusuf Suf Owino	(Kenya)	AM	2015	2016	(Kenya) AFC Leopards	13	0

Source: GSA

== Off season transfers ==
=== In ===
Date	Pos.	Player	To	Ref.
25 Jan 2016	ST	(Kenya) Ezekiel Odera	(Kenya) Sofapaka	
25 Jan 2016	GK	(Kenya) Victor Odhiambo	(Kenya) Posta Rangers	
25 Jan 2016	GK	(Kenya) Frederick Majani	(Kenya) Shabana	
25 Jan 2016	DM	(Kenya) Idd Shikanda	(Kenya) Shabana	
25 Jan 2016	DF	(Kenya) Joshua Mawira	(Kenya) FC Talanta	
25 Jan 2016	MF	(Kenya) Maurice Odhiambo	(Kenya) Nakuru AllStars	
25 Jan 2016	DF	(Kenya) Davies Ikocheli	(Kenya) Ushuru	
25 Jan 2016	MF	(Kenya) Reuben Munyao	(Kenya) Nakumatt FC	
25 Jan 2016	DM	(Kenya) Jacob Onyango	(Kenya) Nakumatt FC	
25 Jan 2016	FW	(Kenya) Benson Iregi	(Kenya) Inter City (loan)	
25 Jan 2016	MF	(Kenya) Simon Ogutu	(Kenya) Vaport Sports	
25 Jan 2016	AM	(Kenya) Oliver Maloba	(Kenya) Vaport Sports	
25 Jan 2016	FW	(Kenya) Daniel Otieno	(Kenya) Vaport Sports	
25 Jan 2016	MF	(Kenya) Peter Wainaina	(Kenya) Mathare United	
25 Jan 2016	ST	(Cameroon) Joel Tata	(Cambodia) NQSA	
25 Jan 2016	MF	(Sierra Leone) Mustafa Umaru Suma	(Bangladesh) Krira Chakra	
25 Jan 2016	MF	(Kenya) Samson Otieno	(Kenya) Magongo Rangers	

=== Out ===
Date	Pos.	Player	To	Ref.
25 Jan 2016	GK	(Kenya) Gradus Ochieng	(Kenya) Gor Mahia	
25 Jan 2016	LB	(Uganda) Fred Nkata	(Kenya) Tusker	
25 Jan 2016	ST	(The Gambia) Ebrimah Sanneh	(Kenya) Ushuru	
25 Jan 2016	MF	(Kenya) Nicholas Kamau	(Kenya) Ushuru	
25 Jan 2016	MF	(Kenya) Jackton Opanda	(Kenya) Ushuru	
25 Jan 2016	MF	(Uganda) Bruno Sserunkuma	(Kenya) Shabana	
25 Jan 2016	FW	(Kenya) Levy Muaka	Retired	
25 Jan 2016	FW	(Kenya) Oscar Kadenge	Retired	
25 Jan 2016	DF	(Kenya) Celestine Imwene	Unattached	
25 Jan 2016	MF	(Uganda) Ismail Kabugu	Unattached	
25 Jan 2016	MF	(Kenya) Elisha Rumwanyo	Unattached	
25 Jan 2016	MF	(Kenya) Paul Karuri	Unattached	
25 Jan 2016	MF	(Kenya) William Kijiwa	Unattached	
25 Jan 2016	MF	(Kenya) Ivan Odhiambo	Unattached	

=== In ===
Date	Pos.	Player	From	Ref.
5 July 2016	GK	(Kenya) Geoffrey Angoya	(Kenya) Mathare United (loan)	
5 July 2016	RB	(Kenya) Kevin Okumu	(Kenya) Young Rovers	
5 July 2016	ST	(The Gambia) Jassey Pa Mulie	(The Gambia) Real de Banjul	
5 July 2016	MF	(Kenya) Hamisi Kyatelekera	(Kenya) Nairobi Stima	
5 July 2016	MF	(Uganda) Ezra Matsiko	(Uganda) Artland Katale	
5 July 2016	ST	(Kenya) Manase Ojwang Orao	Unattached	
5 July 2016	CM	(Kenya) Festo Omukoto	Unattached	
5 July 2016	DF	(Kenya) Franklyne Osama	(Kenya) Muhoroni Youth	

=== Out ===
Date	Pos.	Player	From	Ref.
23 June 2016	DF	(Kenya) Joshua Mawira	(Kenya) AFC Leopards	
23 June 2016	MF	(Kenya) Yusuf Suf Owino	(Kenya) AFC Leopards	
23 June 2016	ST	(Cambodia) Joel Tata	(Kenya) Thika United	
23 June 2016	MF	(Kenya) Samson Otieno	(Kenya) Sofapaka	
23 June 2016	AM	(Kenya) Oscar Mbugua	(Kenya) Ushuru	
23 June 2016	FW	(Kenya) Daniel Otieno	(Kenya) Muhoroni Youth	

== Competitions ==
=== Overall record ===
Competition	First match	Last match	Starting round	Final position	Record							
Competition	First match	Last match	Starting round	Final position	Pld	W	D	L	GF	GA	GD	Win %
2016 KPL	18 Feb 2016	19 Nov 2016	Matchday 1	16th	30	3	10	17	17	39	−22	10.00
2016 GOtv Shield	26 Jun 2016	29 Jul 2016	Round of 64	Round of 32	2	1	0	1	4	4	+0	50.00
Total					32	4	10	18	21	43	−22	12.50

Source: rsssf

=== Premier League ===
==== Results summary ====
Overall								Home						Away					
Pld	W	D	L	GF	GA	GD	Pts	W	D	L	GF	GA	GD	W	D	L	GF	GA	GD
30	3	10	17	17	39	−22	19	1	5	9	10	19	−9	2	5	8	7	20	−13

Source: Soccerway

==== Results by round ====
Round	1	2	3	4	5	6	7	8	9	10	11	12	13	14	15	16	17	18	19	20	21	22	23	24	25	26	27	28	29	30
Ground	H	A	H	A	H	A	H	A	A	H	A	H	A	H	A	H	A	H	A	H	A	H	A	H	A	H	A	H	A	H
Result	D	L	L	D	D	W	W	L	L	L	L	D	L	L	L	D	D	D	L	L	L	L	D	L	W	L	D	L	D	L
Position	6	15	16	15	13	12	9	11	12	13	15	15	15	15	15	15	15	15	15	15	15	16	16	16	15	15	16	16	16	16
Points	1	1	1	2	3	6	9	9	9	9	9	10	10	10	10	11	12	13	13	13	13	13	14	14	17	17	18	18	19	19

Source: Soccerway
A = Away; H = Home; W = Win; D = Draw; L = Loss; P = Postponed

==== Score overview ====
Win Draw Loss

Opposition	Home score	Away score	Aggregate score	Double
AFC Leopards	1-0	0-0	1-0	No
Bandari	2-2	3-1	5-3	No
Chemelil Sugar	0–1	0-0	0–1	No
Gor Mahia	1–2	2-2	3–4	No
Kakamega Homeboyz	1–3	0–1	1–4	No
Mathare United	0–1	2-0	2-1	No
Muhoroni Youth	0–2	1-1	1–2	No
Posta Rangers	0-1	0-0	0-1	No
Sofapaka	0-1	0-5	0-6	No
SoNy Sugar	1-2	0-2	1-4	No
Thika United	0-1	0-1	0-2	No
Tusker	1-1	1-2	2-3	No
Ulinzi Stars	0-3	1-1	1-4	No
Ushuru	0-0	0-0	0-0	No
Western Stima	0-1	0-2	0-3	No

Source: Soccerway

==== Matches ====
Win Draw Loss Fixtures

The league officially kicked off on the 13 February 2016 with a number of games on the cards.

18 February 2016 1	Nairobi City Stars	2-2	Bandari	Nairobi
15:00 UTC+3	Mbugua 3'; Bageya 27'	Report	Muki 15', 56'; Mudde (red card) 73'	Stadium: Nyayo Stadium

21 February 2016 2	Western Stima	2-0	Nairobi City Stars	Kisumu
15:00 UTC+3	Ocholla 47'; Oketch 74'	Report		Stadium: Moi Stadium

27 February 2016 3	Nairobi City Stars	1-2	Tusker	Machakos
15:00 UTC+3	Asike 9' (o.g.)	Report	Ndolo 19'; Mieno 64'	Stadium: Kenyatta Stadium

5 March 2016 4	Chemelil Sugar	0-0	Nairobi City Stars	Chemelil
15:00 UTC+3		Report	Museve (yellow card) 26'	Stadium: Chemelil Complex

23 March 2023 5	Nairobi City Stars	2-2	Gor Mahia	Nairobi
15:00 UTC+3	Bageya 43'; Tata 66'	Report	Aucho (yellow card) 19'; Odhiambo 45', 47'; Shakava (yellow card) 73'; Nizigiyimana (yellow card) 82'	Stadium: Nyayo Stadium

30 March 2016 6	Nairobi City Stars	2-0	Mathare United	Nairobi
15:00 UTC+3		Report	Odera 4'; Mbugua 62'	Stadium: Nyayo Stadium

3 April 2016 7	Nairobi City Stars	1-0	AFC Leopards	Nairobi
15:00 UTC+3	Mawira (yellow card) 28'; Mbugua 65'	Report	Ramathan (yellow card) 40'	Stadium: Nyayo Stadium

9 April 2016 8	Kakamega Homeboyz	1-0	Nairobi City Stars	Mumias
15:00 UTC+3	Murunga 76'	Report		Stadium: Mumias Complex

17 April 2016 9	Thika United	1-0	Nairobi City Stars	Thika
15:00 UTC+3	Nyaberi (yellow card) 44'; Luda 47'; Mwanje (yellow card) 60'	Report	Mawira (yellow card) 15'; Odhiambo (yellow card) 55'; Odera (yellow card) 75'	Stadium: Thika Stadium

23 April 2016 10	Nairobi City Stars	0-1	Sofapaka	Nairobi
15:00 UTC+3		Report	Tiema 67'	Stadium: Nyayo Stadium; Referee: Moses Simiyu

28 April 2016 11	Muhoroni Youth	2-0	Nairobi City Stars	Muhoroni
15:00 UTC+3	Ochomo 1', 54'	Report	Bageya (yellow card) 62'	Stadium: Muhoroni Stadium

7 May 2016 12	Nairobi City Stars	0-0	Ushuru	Nairobi
15:00 UTC+3	Museve (yellow card) 45'; Kagunzi (yellow card) 87'	Report	Bageya (yellow card) 62'	Stadium: Nyayo Stadium

15 May 2016 13	Ulinzi Stars	3-0	Nairobi City Stars	Nakuru
15:00 UTC+3	Ochieng 55'; Makwatta 61', 66'	Report	Tata (yellow card) 85'	Stadium: Afraha Stadium; Attendance: 8200

22 May 2016 14	Nairobi City Stars	0-1	Posta Rangers	Nairobi
15:00 UTC+3	Kagunzi (yellow card) 22'	Report	Likono 21'; Otieno (yellow card) 25'	Stadium: Nyayo Stadium; Referee: David Mulongo

26 May 2016 15	Sony Sugar	2-0	Nairobi City Stars	Awendo
15:00 UTC+3	Onyango 30'; Ademba 45'	Report		Stadium: Green Stadium

2 July 2016 16	Nairobi City Stars	1-1	Muhoroni Youth	Nairobi
15:00 UTC+3	Musiime (yellow card) 53'; Maloba 90'	Report	Ocholla 18'	Stadium: Kasarani

10 July 2016 17	Posta Rangers	0-0	Nairobi City Stars	Nakuru
15:00 UTC+3	Mbugua (yellow card) 12'	Report	Bageya (yellow card) 11'	Stadium: Afraha Stadium; Referee: Davies Omweno

16 July 2016 18	Nairobi City Stars	1-1	Ulinzi Stars	Nairobi
15:00 UTC+3	Omukoto (yellow card) 79'; Odera 81'	Report	Masika 1' (o.g.); Kokoyo (yellow card) 36'; Ochieng (yellow card) 55'	Stadium: Nyayo Stadium; Referee: Peter Kiereini

24 July 2016 19	Gor Mahia	2-1	Nairobi City Stars	Nairobi
15:00 UTC+3	Shakava 22'; Okoth 90'	Report	Odera 23'	Stadium: Nyayo Stadium; Referee: George Mwai

3 August 2016 20	Nairobi City Stars	0-1	Chemelil Sugar	Nairobi
15:00 UTC+3		Report	Gambereko 34'	Stadium: Nyayo Stadium

7 August 2016 21	Sofapaka	5-0	Nairobi City Stars	Machakos
15:00 UTC+3	Okwil 11'; Gichuki 38'; Abich 60'; Odhiambo 80'; Mutanga 85'	Report		Stadium: Kenyatta Stadium

14 August 2016 22	Nairobi City Stars	0-1	Mathare United	Nairobi
15:00 UTC+3	Omukoto (yellow card) 33'; Museve (yellow card) 35'	Report	Mwangi (yellow card) 42'; Kamura (yellow card) 66' (goal) 71'	Stadium: Nyayo Stadium; Referee: Dr. Waweru

21 August 2016 23	AFC Leopards	0-0	Nairobi City Stars	Nakuru
15:00 UTC+3	Mangoli (yellow card) 62'	Report	Ndung'u (yellow card) 35'; Osama (yellow card) 36'; Amboko (yellow card) 45'; Odera (yellow card) 68'	Stadium: Afraha Stadium; Referee: Isaac Memusi

11 September 2016 24	Nairobi City Stars	0-1	Western Stima	Nairobi
15:00 UTC+3	Sakwa (yellow card) 25'	Report	Kemboi 20'; Shimonyo (yellow card) 43'	Stadium: Nyayo Stadium; Referee: Haji Adede

11 September 2016 25	Bandari	1-3	Nairobi City Stars	Mombasa
15:00 UTC+3	Boraafya 16'; Mohammed (yellow card) 26'	Report	Bageya 42'; Odhiambo (yellow card) 57'; Iregi 81'; Maloba 90+6'	Stadium: Mbaraki

15 October 2016 26	Nairobi City Stars	0-1	Thika United	Nairobi
15:00 UTC+3	Bageya (red card) 40'	Report	Meja (red card) 40'; Odhiambo 85' (pen.)	Stadium: Kasarani

23 October 2016 27	Tusker	1-1	Nairobi City Stars	Nakuru
15:00 UTC+3	Ndolo 35'	Report	Ndung'u 50'; Odhiambo (yellow card) 88'	Stadium: Afraha Stadium

30 October 2016 28	Nairobi City Stars	1-3	Kakamega Homeboyz	Nairobi
15:00 UTC+3	Mullie 82'	Report	Okoth 7'; Mauda 26'; Bhai 52'	Stadium: Kasarani; Referee: Hosea Omondi

4 November 2016 29	Ushuru	0-0	Nairobi City Stars	Nairobi
15:00 UTC+3	Ochieng (yellow card) 84'	Report		Stadium: Ruaraka Grounds; Referee: Andrew Juma

19 November 2016 30	Nairobi City Stars	1-2	SoNy Sugar	Nairobi
15:00 UTC+3	Museve (yellow card) 33' (yellow-red card) 50'; Odera 80'	Report	Omweri 67'; Muchiri 90'	Stadium: Ruaraka Grounds

=== GOtv Shield ===
Win Draw Loss Fixtures

26 Jun 2016 Round of 64	Levantis United	1-2	Nairobi City Stars	Nairobi
15:00 UTC+3	Duru 51'	Report	Bageya 54'; Odera 65'	Stadium: Camp Toyoyo

30 Jul 2016 Round of 32	Chemelil Sugar	3-2	Nairobi City Stars	Chemelil
15:00 UTC+3	Majid 45'; Adebayo 72'; Mwita 87'	Report	Iregi 68'; Ndung'u 82'	Stadium: Chemelil Complex

== Statistics ==
=== Goalscorers ===
No.	Pos.	Player	Premier League	GOtv Shield	Total
	ST	(Kenya) Ezekiel Odera	4	1	5
	FW	(Uganda) Jimmy Bageya	3	1	4
	AM	(Kenya) Oscar Mbugua	3	0	3
	AM	(Kenya) Oliver Maloba	2	0	2
	FW	(Kenya) Benson Iregi	1	1	2
	FW	(Kenya) Robert Ndung'u	1	1	2
	FW	(The Gambia) Pa Mulie Jassey	1	0	1
	FW	(Cameroon) Joel Tata	1	0	1
Own goals			1	0	1
Totals			17	4	21

=== Top Assists ===
No.	Pos.	Player	Premier League	GOtv Shield	Total
	FW	(Uganda) Jimmy Bageya	6	0	6
	ST	(Kenya) Ezekiel Odera	1	0	1
	AM	(Kenya) Oscar Mbugua	1	0	1
	AM	(Kenya) Oliver Maloba	1	0	1
	FW	(Kenya) Benson Iregi	1	0	1
	FW	(Kenya) Robert Ndung'u	1	0	1
	DF	(Kenya) Franklyne Osama	1	0	1
Totals			12	0	12

=== Clean sheets ===
Rank	No.	Pos.	Player	Premier League	GOtv Shield	Total
1	13	GK	(Kenya) Victor Odhiambo	4	0	4
2	30	GK	(Kenya) Ronny Kagunzi	3	0	3
3	20	GK	(Kenya) Geoffrey Angoya	0	0	0
Players who left the club
4	20	GK	(Kenya) Frederick Majani	0	0	0
Totals				7	0	7

=== Discipline ===
No.	Pos.	Player	Premier League			GOtv Shield			Total		
No.	Pos.	Player	Booked	(yellow card) (yellow-red card)	Sent off (straight red)	Booked	(yellow card) (yellow-red card)	Sent off (straight red)	Booked	(yellow card) (yellow-red card)	Sent off (straight red)
2	AM	(Kenya) Jacob Onyango	0	0	0	0	0	0	0	0	0
3	MF	(Sierra Leone) Mustafa Suma	0	0	0	0	0	0	0	0	0
4	CB	(Uganda) Luis Masika	0	0	0	0	0	0	0	0	0
5	DF	(Kenya) Franklyne Osama	1	0	0	0	0	0	1	0	0
6	DF	(Kenya) Kelvin Odhiambo	0	0	0	0	0	0	0	0	0
7	FW	(Kenya) Robert Ndung'u	1	0	0	0	0	0	1	0	0
8	DF	(Kenya) Calvin Masawa	0	0	0	0	0	0	0	0	0
10	CM	(Uganda) Peter Musiime	1	0	0	0	0	0	1	0	0
13	GK	(Kenya) Victor Odhiambo	2	0	0	0	0	0	2	0	0
14	FW	(Uganda) Ezra Matsiko	0	0	0	0	0	0	0	0	0
15	DF	(Kenya) Peter Wainaina	0	0	0	0	0	0	0	0	0
16	ST	(The Gambia) Jassey Pa Mulie	0	0	0	0	0	0	0	0	0
16	DF	(Kenya) Davies Ikocheli	0	0	0	0	0	0	0	0	0
17	MF	(Kenya) Samuel Wailler	0	0	0	0	0	0	0	0	0
18	DF	(Kenya) Arthur Museve	3	0	1	0	0	0	3	0	1
19	ST	(Kenya) Manaseh Orao	0	0	0	0	0	0	0	0	0
20	GK	(Kenya) Geoffrey Angoya	0	0	0	0	0	0	0	0	0
21	AM	(Kenya) Oliver Maloba	0	0	0	0	0	0	0	0	0
22	MF	(Kenya) Festo Omukoto	2	0	0	0	0	0	2	0	0
23	ST	(Kenya) Ezekiel Odera	2	0	0	0	0	0	2	0	0
24	DF	(Kenya) Simon Ogutu	0	0	0	0	0	0	0	0	0
26	MF	(Kenya) Joseph Sakwa	1	2	1	0	0	0	1	2	1
27	CB	(Kenya) John Amboko	1	0	0	0	0	0	1	0	0
28	DF	(Kenya) Idd Shikanda	0	0	0	0	0	0	0	0	0
29	MF	(Kenya) Maurice Odhiambo	0	0	0	0	0	0	0	0	0
30	GK	(Kenya) Ronny Kagunzi	2	0	0	0	0	0	2	0	0
40	FW	(Kenya) Benson Iregi	0	0	0	0	0	0	0	0	0
50	ST	(Uganda) Jimmy Bageya	2	0	1	0	0	0	2	0	1
Players who left the club
5	CB	(Kenya) Joshua Mawira	2	0	0	0	0	0	2	0	0
9	ST	(Kenya) Daniel Otieno	0	0	0	0	0	0	0	0	0
11	AM	(Kenya) Oscar Mbugua	0	0	0	0	0	0	0	0	0
20	GK	(Kenya) Fredrick Majani	0	0	0	0	0	0	0	0	0
22	ST	(Cameroon) Joel Tata	1	0	0	0	0	0	1	0	0
25	MF	(Kenya) Yusuf Suf Owino	0	0	0	0	0	0	0	0	0
Totals			21	2	2	0	0	0	21	2	2

Source: Soccerway
