= 2015 Kenyan Premier League =

Kenyan Premier League
- Season: 2015
- Champions: Gor Mahia; 3rd Premier League title; 15th Kenyan title overall
- Relegated: K.C.B.; Nakuru AllStars
- Champ. League: Gor Mahia
- Top 8 Cup: Gor Mahia; Ulinzi Stars; Sofapaka; Bandari; Tusker; Muhoroni Youth; A.F.C. Leopards; Ushuru
- Matches: 240
- Goals: 534 (2.23 per match)
- Top goalscorer: Jesse Were (22 goals)
- Biggest home win: Gor Mahia 5–0 Nakuru AllStars (17 May 2015)
- Biggest away win: 2 matches: Sofapaka 0–5 Tusker (19 July 2015); K.C.B. 1–6 Gor Mahia (9 August 2015)
- Highest scoring: K.C.B. 6–2 Nakuru AllStars (21 March 2015)
- All statistics correct as of 1 November 2015.

The 2015 Kenyan Premier League (known as the Tusker Premier League and thereafter the SportPesa Premier League for sponsorship reasons) was the twelfth season of the Kenyan Premier League since it began in 2003, and the 52nd season of top-division football in Kenya since 1963. It began on 21 February and ended on 1 November.

Before the beginning of the season, talks with the Football Kenya Federation (FKF) concerning the expansion of the top tier to 18 teams fell through. While the KPL continued with its agenda for the season, the FKF created a parallel top division called the FKF Premier League (FKF PL), consisting of 18 teams. In March, an agreement was reached to maintain, for the 2015 season, the KPL as the top division with the FKF PL as the second tier.

A total of 16 teams competed for the Kenyan Premier League, all returning from the 2014 season. Nairobi City Stars and Top Fry AllStars were not replaced as membership for the FKF Premier League was drawn from majority of the teams from the 2014 Kenyan National Super League, including those that were to be promoted to the Kenyan Premier League.

On 16 September, defending champions Gor Mahia beat Sony Sugar 1–0 to win a third consecutive league title with 4 matches to spare. Finishing the season unbeaten with a record of 24–6–0 (24 wins, 6 draws, no losses), Gor Mahia remained the only club in Kenya to complete an unbeaten season (after achieving the same feat in the 1976 season) and became the only club in Kenya to have done so twice. They also became the first club in Africa to finish a whole season unbeaten since Egyptian Premier League giants Al Ahly went through both the 2004–05 and 2005–06 seasons without a single loss en route to their 30th and 31st league titles. Gor Mahia will represent Kenya in the preliminary round of the 2016 CAF Champions League and will play against the 2015 FKF President's Cup champions at the 2016 Kenyan Super Cup.

== Teams ==
Locations of the 2015 Kenyan Premier League teams.
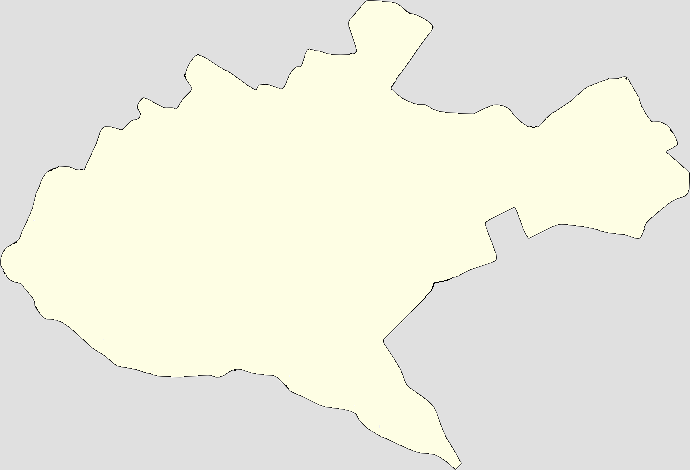
Locations of the 2015 Kenyan Premier League teams within Nairobi.

Half of the 16 participating teams are based in the capital, Nairobi, while Bandari is the only team based at the Coast.

=== Stadia and locations ===
| Team | Location | Stadium | Capacity |
|---|---|---|---|
| A.F.C. Leopards | Nairobi | Nyayo National Stadium | 30,000 |
| Bandari | Mombasa | Mombasa Municipal Stadium | 10,000 |
| Chemelil Sugar | Chemelil | Chemelil Sports Complex | 5,000 |
| Gor Mahia | Nairobi | Nairobi City Stadium | 15,000 |
| KCB | Nairobi | Nairobi City Stadium | 15,000 |
| Mathare United | Nairobi | Kasarani Stadium | 60,000 |
| Muhoroni Youth | Muhoroni | Muhoroni Stadium | 5,000 |
| Nairobi City Stars | Nairobi | Hope Centre | 5,000 |
| Nakuru AllStars | Nakuru | Afraha Stadium | 8,200 |
| Sofapaka | Nairobi | Nyayo National Stadium | 30,000 |
| Sony Sugar | Awendo | Green Stadium | 5,000 |
| Thika United | Thika | Thika Municipal Stadium | 5,000 |
| Tusker | Nairobi | Kasarani Stadium | 60,000 |
| Ulinzi Stars | Nakuru | Afraha Stadium | 8,200 |
| Ushuru | Nairobi | Public Service Grounds | Unknown |
| Western Stima | Kakamega | Bukhungu Stadium | 5,000 |

== Naming rights ==
On 21 August 2012, the Kenyan Premier League signed a three-year deal worth KSh.170 million/= (US$2.02 million; £1.28 million sterling; €1.62 million) with East African Breweries to rename the league to the Tusker Premier League (TPL).

For sponsorship reasons, the league was known by that name until 6 August 2015, when East African betting company SportPesa gained the naming rights to the league in a four-and-a-half-year deal reportedly worth KSh.450 million/= (approx. US$4.36 million, £2.84 million stg. or €3.87 million) to rename the league to the SportPesa Premier League, nearly three times the value of the previous deal with Tusker.

== Pre-season crisis ==
Towards the end of the 2014 season, the FKF proposed that the Premier League should be expanded to 18 teams from 16 for the upcoming season, though KPL management insisted that the 2015 season would continue with 16 teams. Reasons given by the KPL for the opposition of the expansion of the league included the national team needing more time for friendlies and competitive matches to increase the nation's FIFA World Ranking, as well as an increased risk of injury to Premier League players – especially since only very few clubs have medical insurance to cover costs of the rehabilitation of players – further undermining the performance of the national team. However, in a statement released on 25 November 2014, the FKF insisted that the decision to expand the league was "final and irreversible".

On 19 December 2014, a statement signed by FKF chairman Sam Nyamweya and KPL chairman Ambrose Rachier revealed the formation of a six-man committee with three representatives from each side to hold talks with three FIFA delegates to come up with resolutions on the crisis. On 15 January 2015, Nyamweya announced that the 2015 Kenyan Premier League season was set to kick off on the second week of February, adding that the FKF was "working hard to ensure all matters are settled as soon as possible". However, Cabinet Secretary for Sports, Culture and the Arts Hassan Wario threatened to disband the FKF the next day, who he said were "letting down Kenya and the youths of this country." On 27 January, the FKF ejected a consultant report sent in by FIFA delegate Robert Niemann regarding the Premier League after FIFA had directed that the report be released to all concerned parties in the crisis, including the KPL.

Following a KPL Governing Council meeting held on 24 January 2015, the KPL announced four days later that the league was set to begin on 21 February with 16 teams, with fixtures to be reviewed and approved at a meeting to be held in early February. Committee members expressed hope that an agreement with the FKF would be finalised and signed before the league's kick-off, but authorised matches to be played with or without a signed agreement with the FKF. In response, the FKF announced the creation of the FKF Premier League consisting of 18 teams just hours later, setting its kick-off date for 14 February. Top referees in Kenya showed their support for the KPL thereafter, with one referee asking that if the Federation "cannot be honest with such a small tournament [the 2014 FKF President's Cup; officials had not yet been paid for their duties there], how can they be trusted to run the league?"

On 30 January, Wario ordered the FKF to release the previously ejected FIFA report to all concerned parties including the Ministry of Sports, Culture and the Arts "without any further delay". In response, the FKF insisted that the report was not meant for "any other parties" other than itself and the Kenyan Premier League. In a Special General Meeting convened by the FKF the same day, the governing body resolved to maintain its previous directive to stage the eighteen-team FKF Premier League. On 2 February 2015, the KPL declared it would "ignore any FKF decisions and threats which violate the previous FIFA and FKF-KPL cooperation agreements and arrangements over the last decade, adding that it would "refocus KPL's limited resources on continuing to make the KPL one of the most corruption-free, professionally managed, highly competitive and widely admired leagues in Africa" instead of "wasting any more time and energy on unproductive wrangles".

In the FIFA report that was finally sent to KPL chairman Ambrose Rachier, it emerged that FIFA had recommended that the KPL continue to be competed by 16 teams for the 2015 season and that the KPL remain the official body to run the Kenyan top flight on behalf of the FKF. The report also revealed that FKF chairman Sam Nyamweya influenced the promotion of Shabana from the National Super League to the Premier League, a move that was previously questioned by the KPL Governing Council in December 2014.

After 2014 league champions Gor Mahia beat 2014 cup champions Sofapaka at the 2015 Kenyan Super Cup, the FKF fined both teams a total of KSh.200,000/= each for participating in the unsanctioned match, adding that the teams would face further disciplinary action if they continued to defy them, while the match officials were all also handed three-month bans for participating in the match. On 13 February, Sofapaka president Elly Kalekwa announced that neither his club nor any other KPL club would honour the FKF Premier League and pledged to remain a part of the KPL. The FKF later kicked out all KPL clubs from the FKF Premier League and drew member clubs from the National Super League, with its first match ending in a 1–0 victory for Shabana over Nakumatt. Having been given until 18 February by Cabinet Secretary Wario to reach an agreement over the running and composition of Kenya's top flight, talks between the KPL and the FKF collapsed once more, with KPL chairman Rachier stating that the KPL walked out on the meeting because the FKF showed up with 30 representatives to outnumber them and win a vote that was to be taken on the issue.

On 24 February, a court order acquired by the FKF forced the season to be put on hold, while the KPL presented documents challenging the ruling the following day. After the court injunction was extended in a hearing on 5 March, the High Court of Kenya allowed the league to continue operations through a ruling delivered on 16 March. Lady Justice Aburili, who presided over the case, ruled that the FKF could not sue or be sued under its own name unless its officials began legal proceedings on its behalf and advised that a solution to the crisis be agreed on between the two parties out of court. On 23 March, a FIFA delegation assigned to the case, led by Ghana Football Association president Kwesi Nyantakyi, announced its support for the 16-team Kenyan Premier League but suggested that the league be contested by 18 teams from 2016 onwards. The same day, an agreement was finalised between FKF and KPL representatives, with the two parties agreeing on a number of issues, including the official recognition of the KPL as the top tier and the FKF PL as the second tier of the Kenyan football league system for 2015 and the allocation of all commercial rights for the top division beginning 2016, as well as a memorandum of understanding outlining the promotion and relegation system between the two leagues for 2015 and the relationship between the two parties regarding the government of the top tier beginning 2016.

== League table ==
| Pos | Team | Pld | W | D | L | GF | GA | GD | Pts | Qualification or relegation |
|---|---|---|---|---|---|---|---|---|---|---|
| 1 | Gor Mahia (C, Q) | 30 | 24 | 6 | 0 | 60 | 12 | +48 | 78 | Qualification for 2016 CAF Champions League (Note: The winners of the 2015 FKF President's Cup will qualify for the 2016 CAF Confederation Cup.) |
| 2 | Ulinzi Stars | 30 | 17 | 7 | 6 | 41 | 25 | +16 | 58 | |
| 3 | Sofapaka | 30 | 12 | 11 | 7 | 39 | 39 | 0 | 47 | |
| 4 | Bandari | 30 | 12 | 10 | 8 | 32 | 25 | +7 | 46 | |
| 5 | Tusker | 30 | 12 | 8 | 10 | 46 | 28 | +18 | 44 | |
| 6 | Muhoroni Youth | 30 | 11 | 11 | 8 | 31 | 36 | −5 | 44 | |
| 7 | A.F.C. Leopards | 30 | 11 | 8 | 11 | 33 | 30 | +3 | 41 | |
| 8 | Ushuru | 30 | 9 | 10 | 11 | 22 | 28 | −6 | 37 | |
| 9 | Mathare United | 30 | 7 | 15 | 8 | 35 | 34 | +1 | 36 | |
| 10 | SoNy Sugar | 30 | 9 | 8 | 13 | 23 | 26 | −3 | 35 | |
| 11 | Western Stima | 30 | 9 | 8 | 13 | 25 | 31 | −6 | 35 | |
| 12 | Thika United | 30 | 10 | 5 | 15 | 31 | 42 | −11 | 35 | |
| 13 | Chemelil Sugar | 30 | 6 | 14 | 10 | 23 | 35 | −12 | 32 | |
| 14 | Nairobi City Stars | 30 | 6 | 10 | 14 | 25 | 37 | −12 | 28 | |
| 15 | Kenya Commercial Bank (R) | 30 | 6 | 8 | 16 | 34 | 48 | −14 | 26 | Relegation to 2016 National Super League |
| 16 | Nakuru AllStars (R) | 30 | 4 | 11 | 15 | 34 | 58 | −24 | 23 | Relegation to 2016 National Super League |

Updated to match(es) played on 1 November 2015. Source: Kenyan Premier League
Rules for classification: 1) points; 2) goal difference; 3) number of goals scored.
(C) Champions; (Q) Qualified for the phase indicated; (R) Relegated

=== Positions by round ===
The table lists the positions of teams after each week of matches. In order to preserve chronological evolvements, any postponed matches are not included to the round at which they were originally scheduled, but added to the full round they were played immediately afterwards. For example, if a match is scheduled for matchday 13, but then postponed and played between days 16 and 17, it will be added to the standings for day 16.

| Team ╲ Round | 1 | 2 | 3 | 4 | 5 | 6 | 7 | 8 | 9 | 10 | 11 | 12 | 13 | 14 | 15 | 16 | 17 | 18 | 19 | 20 | 21 | 22 | 23 | 24 | 25 | 26 | 27 | 28 | 29 | 30 |
|---|---|---|---|---|---|---|---|---|---|---|---|---|---|---|---|---|---|---|---|---|---|---|---|---|---|---|---|---|---|---|
| Gor Mahia | 1 | 1 | 1 | 1 | 3 | 3 | 2 | 1 | 1 | 1 | 1 | 1 | 1 | 1 | 1 | 1 | 1 | 1 | 1 | 1 | 1 | 1 | 1 | 1 | 1 | 1 | 1 | 1 | 1 | 1 |
| Ulinzi Stars | 14 | 15 | 10 | 7 | 8 | 4 | 5 | 2 | 3 | 5 | 7 | 4 | 3 | 3 | 3 | 3 | 3 | 2 | 2 | 2 | 2 | 2 | 2 | 2 | 2 | 2 | 2 | 2 | 2 | 2 |
| Sofapaka | 5 | 7 | 4 | 10 | 10 | 9 | 6 | 5 | 7 | 7 | 6 | 3 | 2 | 2 | 2 | 2 | 2 | 3 | 4 | 3 | 3 | 3 | 3 | 3 | 3 | 3 | 3 | 3 | 4 | 3 |
| Bandari | 2 | 6 | 3 | 3 | 2 | 2 | 4 | 6 | 8 | 10 | 11 | 10 | 10 | 10 | 10 | 8 | 6 | 6 | 6 | 6 | 6 | 6 | 6 | 6 | 7 | 7 | 5 | 5 | 3 | 4 |
| Tusker | 7 | 9 | 11 | 6 | 6 | 7 | 9 | 8 | 4 | 3 | 2 | 5 | 7 | 6 | 7 | 5 | 5 | 5 | 5 | 4 | 4 | 4 | 4 | 4 | 4 | 5 | 7 | 6 | 6 | 5 |
| Muhoroni Youth | 12 | 12 | 14 | 14 | 13 | 12 | 12 | 13 | 12 | 13 | 13 | 13 | 13 | 14 | 15 | 13 | 12 | 11 | 11 | 11 | 10 | 9 | 7 | 7 | 5 | 4 | 4 | 4 | 5 | 6 |
| A.F.C. Leopards | 8 | 3 | 5 | 5 | 5 | 6 | 8 | 7 | 9 | 6 | 5 | 2 | 6 | 5 | 4 | 6 | 4 | 4 | 3 | 5 | 5 | 5 | 5 | 5 | 6 | 6 | 6 | 7 | 7 | 7 |
| Ushuru | 10 | 13 | 9 | 12 | 12 | 13 | 13 | 9 | 10 | 11 | 8 | 9 | 8 | 8 | 6 | 4 | 7 | 8 | 8 | 8 | 9 | 10 | 8 | 8 | 9 | 8 | 8 | 8 | 8 | 8 |
| Mathare United | 11 | 8 | 8 | 11 | 4 | 5 | 7 | 11 | 11 | 9 | 10 | 8 | 9 | 9 | 9 | 10 | 10 | 10 | 9 | 9 | 7 | 8 | 10 | 9 | 11 | 12 | 14 | 10 | 9 | 9 |
| SoNy Sugar | 3 | 2 | 2 | 4 | 7 | 8 | 3 | 10 | 6 | 8 | 9 | 11 | 11 | 11 | 12 | 12 | 11 | 13 | 13 | 12 | 12 | 12 | 12 | 12 | 12 | 11 | 13 | 11 | 11 | 10 |
| Western Stima | 4 | 5 | 7 | 2 | 1 | 1 | 1 | 4 | 5 | 4 | 4 | 7 | 5 | 4 | 5 | 9 | 9 | 7 | 7 | 7 | 8 | 7 | 9 | 10 | 8 | 9 | 9 | 12 | 12 | 11 |
| Thika United | 6 | 11 | 12 | 8 | 11 | 10 | 10 | 3 | 2 | 2 | 3 | 6 | 4 | 7 | 8 | 7 | 8 | 9 | 10 | 10 | 11 | 11 | 11 | 11 | 10 | 10 | 10 | 9 | 10 | 12 |
| Chemelil Sugar | 9 | 10 | 13 | 9 | 9 | 11 | 11 | 12 | 13 | 12 | 12 | 12 | 12 | 12 | 11 | 11 | 13 | 14 | 14 | 13 | 14 | 14 | 14 | 13 | 13 | 13 | 11 | 13 | 13 | 13 |
| Nairobi City Stars | 15 | 14 | 15 | 15 | 16 | 16 | 16 | 15 | 15 | 15 | 15 | 15 | 15 | 15 | 14 | 15 | 15 | 15 | 15 | 15 | 15 | 15 | 15 | 15 | 15 | 15 | 15 | 15 | 14 | 14 |
| Kenya Commercial Bank | 13 | 4 | 6 | 13 | 14 | 14 | 14 | 14 | 14 | 14 | 14 | 14 | 14 | 13 | 13 | 14 | 14 | 12 | 12 | 14 | 13 | 13 | 13 | 14 | 14 | 14 | 12 | 14 | 15 | 15 |
| Nakuru AllStars | 16 | 16 | 16 | 16 | 15 | 15 | 15 | 16 | 16 | 16 | 16 | 16 | 16 | 16 | 16 | 16 | 16 | 16 | 16 | 16 | 16 | 16 | 16 | 16 | 16 | 16 | 16 | 16 | 16 | 16 |

| Leader |
| Relegation to the 2016 Kenyan National Super League |

Updated to match(es) played on 1 November 2015. Source: Futaa.com

== Results ==
| Home \ Away | AFC | BND | CHM | GOR | KCB | MAU | MHY | NCS | NAS | SOF | SNY | THU | TUS | ULS | UFC | WST |
|---|---|---|---|---|---|---|---|---|---|---|---|---|---|---|---|---|
| A.F.C. Leopards | | 1–1 | 1–2 | 1–1 | 2–1 | 0–0 | 2–0 | 2–1 | 3–1 | 1–0 | 5–1 | 1–1 | 1–3 | 0–1 | 0–1 | 1–0 |
| Bandari | 1–2 | | 0–0 | 1–2 | 3–1 | 0–0 | 3–1 | 2–1 | 1–1 | 1–2 | 0–1 | 2–0 | 1–0 | 0–2 | 1–0 | 3–1 |
| Chemelil Sugar | 0–0 | 1–1 | | 1–4 | 1–0 | 1–1 | 0–2 | 1–1 | 1–0 | 0–1 | 0–0 | 0–1 | 2–2 | 2–3 | 1–0 | 0–0 |
| Gor Mahia | 2–0 | 2–1 | 3–1 | | 3–1 | 4–2 | 2–0 | 3–1 | 5–0 | 0–0 | 1–0 | 2–0 | 1–0 | 2–0 | 2–0 | 1–0 |
| Kenya Commercial Bank | 1–3 | 0–1 | 0–1 | 1–6 | | 2–2 | 3–0 | 1–3 | 6–2 | 2–0 | 0–0 | 1–1 | 1–0 | 0–2 | 3–0 | 0–2 |
| Mathare United | 1–1 | 1–1 | 1–1 | 1–1 | 0–0 | | 3–0 | 2–0 | 2–1 | 2–2 | 1–1 | 2–0 | 1–0 | 1–2 | 1–3 | 2–1 |
| Muhoroni Youth | 1–1 | 1–0 | 0–0 | 0–1 | 1–0 | 1–0 | | 0–0 | 2–2 | 1–1 | 0–0 | 1–0 | 2–2 | 2–1 | 1–1 | 1–0 |
| Nairobi City Stars | 0–1 | 0–1 | 1–1 | 0–3 | 1–0 | 2–0 | 1–2 | | 1–1 | 0–0 | 1–1 | 2–2 | 1–2 | 0–2 | 1–1 | 1–2 |
| Nakuru AllStars | 2–1 | 1–1 | 2–2 | 1–1 | 5–2 | 0–0 | 1–3 | 1–1 | | 1–3 | 1–0 | 1–2 | 1–3 | 1–3 | 0–0 | 0–1 |
| Sofapaka | 1–1 | 2–2 | 1–0 | 0–2 | 1–1 | 1–1 | 2–2 | 2–0 | 3–3 | | 2–1 | 2–1 | 0–5 | 2–1 | 2–1 | 1–0 |
| SoNy Sugar | 2–1 | 0–1 | 3–1 | 0–1 | 0–0 | 2–1 | 0–0 | 0–1 | 1–2 | 2–0 | | 0–1 | 0–1 | 1–1 | 1–0 | 0–1 |
| Thika United | 1–0 | 1–2 | 0–1 | 0–2 | 2–3 | 1–3 | 4–2 | 1–0 | 2–1 | 2–3 | 0–2 | | 1–1 | 1–2 | 2–0 | 1–2 |
| Tusker | 1–0 | 0–1 | 5–1 | 0–1 | 1–1 | 1–1 | 2–3 | 0–1 | 3–0 | 1–2 | 2–0 | 4–0 | | 2–1 | 0–1 | 1–1 |
| Ulinzi Stars | 1–0 | 0–0 | 0–0 | 0–0 | 2–1 | 2–1 | 3–0 | 1–1 | 3–2 | 1–0 | 0–2 | 0–2 | 1–1 | | 2–0 | 1–0 |
| Ushuru | 0–1 | 0–0 | 1–0 | 0–2 | 2–1 | 2–1 | 1–1 | 0–1 | 2–0 | 1–1 | 1–0 | 0–0 | 0–0 | 1–1 | | 2–2 |
| Western Stima | 2–0 | 1–0 | 1–1 | 0–0 | 1–1 | 1–1 | 0–1 | 2–1 | 0–0 | 3–2 | 0–2 | 0–1 | 1–3 | 0–2 | 0–1 | |

Updated to match(es) played on 1 November 2015. Source: Kenyan Premier League
Legend: Blue = home team win; Yellow = draw; Red = away team win.

== Top scorers ==
| Rank | Player | Club | Goals |
|---|---|---|---|
| 1 | (Kenya) Jesse Were | Tusker | 22 |
| 2 | (Kenya) Michael Olunga | Gor Mahia | 19 |
| 3 | (Kenya) John Mark Makwatta | Ulinzi Stars | 14 |
| 4 | (Rwanda) Meddie Kagere | Gor Mahia | 13 |
| 5 | (Kenya) Ali Abondo | Gor Mahia | 11 |
| 5 | (Kenya) Raphael Paul Muigai Kiongera | Kenya Commercial Bank | 11 |
| 5 | (The Gambia) Ebrimah Sanneh | Nairobi City Stars | 11 |
| 8 | (Kenya) Noah Abich | Mathare United | 9 |
| 8 | (Kenya) Boniface Akenga | Nakuru AllStars | 9 |
| 8 | (Kenya) John Baraza | Sofapaka | 9 |
| 8 | (Democratic Republic of the Congo) Lwamba Mulondwa | Nakuru AllStars | 9 |

Last updated: 1 November 2015

=== Hat-tricks ===
| Player | For | Against | Score | Date |
|---|---|---|---|---|
| (Kenya) Raymond Omondi | Thika United | Muhoroni | 4-2 | 28 March 2015 |
| (Kenya) Michael Olunga^{4} | Gor Mahia | Chemelil | 1-4 | 27 June 2015 |
| (Kenya) Jesse Were | Tusker | Chemelil | 5-1 | 12 July 2015 |
| (Kenya) Jesse Were | Tusker | Sofapaka | 0-5 | 18 July 2015 |
| (Kenya) Jesse Were | Tusker | Thika United | 4-0 | 27 July 2015 |
| (Kenya) Paul Kiongera | KCB | Thika United | 2-3 | 1 August 2015 |
| (Kenya) Boniface Akenga | Nakuru All Stars | KCB | 5-2 | 13 September 2015 |
| (Kenya) John Makwatta | Ulinzi Stars | Chemelil | 2-3 | 3 November 2015 |

== Awards ==
=== Player of the Month ===
On 28 April 2015, the Sports Journalists' Association of Kenya (SJAK), in partnership with the league's sponsors SportPesa, launched the KPL Player of the Month award to be given to the best performing player over each month, selected by a panel consisting of members of the SJAK. The winner receives KSh.50,000/= in prize money, as well as a personalised trophy and a 42-inch smart TV. The recipient of the inaugural award was Gor Mahia midfielder Ali Abondo, who was recognised as the best player for the month of March.

| Month | Player | Position | Club | Ref |
|---|---|---|---|---|
| March | (Kenya) Ali Abondo | Midfielder | Gor Mahia | |
| April | (Kenya) John Mark Makwatta | Forward | Ulinzi Stars | |
| May | (Kenya) Gabriel Andika | Goalkeeper | Western Stima | |
| June | (Burundi) Karim Nizigiyimana | Defender | Gor Mahia | |
| July | (Kenya) Jesse Were | Forward | Tusker | |
| August | (Kenya) George Mandela | Forward | Muhoroni Youth | |
| September | (Rwanda) Meddie Kagere | Forward | Gor Mahia | |
| October | (Uganda) Jimmy Bageya | Forward | Nairobi City Stars | |

== See also ==
- 2015 FKF President's Cup
- 2015 KPL Top 8 Cup
- 2015 Kenyan Super Cup
