= 2015 FKF President's Cup =

GOtv Shield

Tournament details
- Country: Kenya
- Dates: 20 June–13 December 2015
- Teams: 64

Final positions
- Champions: Bandari
- Runners-up: Nakumatt
- Third place: Muhoroni Youth
- Fourth place: Gor Mahia
- Confed. Cup: Bandari
- All statistics correct as of 13 December 2015.

The 2015 FKF President's Cup (known as the GOtv Shield for sponsorship reasons) was the 44th season of Kenya's top domestic cup competition. It kicked off on 20 June and concluded on 13 December, with the domestic broadcasting rights for the competition held by SuperSport. Originally scheduled to begin on 6 June, participating teams were required to pay a registration fee of KSh. 30,000/= each by 30 May to enter the tournament. The competition's defending champions are Sofapaka, who beat second-tier side Posta Rangers 2–1 in the previous final. Unlike the previous competition, no teams were seeded and given byes to further rounds, with the Football Kenya Federation's media officer John Kariuki explaining the decision as a way of "trying to make the competition more exciting because this being the domestic cup competition, we want the thrill of big teams facing the prospect of losing in the hands of lower-ranked teams."

Kenyan Premier League side Bandari beat second-tier Nakumatt 4–2 in the final to win their first ever title. They received 2,000,000/= in prize money and will represent Kenya in the preliminary round of the 2016 CAF Confederation Cup.

== Teams ==
Round	Clubs remaining	Clubs involved	Winners from previous round	New entries this round	Leagues/teams entering at this round	Prize money
First round	64	64	none	64	Kenyan Premier League; FKF Premier League; National Super League; FKF Division One; Regional Leagues; County Champions League; Sub-County League; Non-league teams	none
Second round	32	32	32	none	none	none
Third round	16	16	16	none	none	none
Fourth round	8	8	8	none	none	none
Semi-finals	4	4	4	none	none	none
Third place	2	2	2	none	none	KSh. 750,000/=^{3} 500,000/=^{4}
Final	2	2	2	none	none	2,000,000/=^{1} 1,000,000/=^{2}

Key to numbers in match results
1	Kenyan Premier League
2	FKF Premier League
3	National Super League
4	FKF Division One
5	Regional Leagues
6	County Champions League
7	Sub-County League
n	Non-league team

Key:
- 1 – Winners
- 2 – Runners-up
- 3 – Third-placed team
- 4 – Fourth-placed team

== First round ==
The draw for the first round was held on 9 June.

=== Teams withdrawing from the competition ===
For various reasons, eight teams pulled out of the first round to reduce the original number of teams from 72 to 64. Of the eight, three compete in the Kenyan Premier League, another four in the FKF Premier League, another and one in the National Super League.

- Agrochemical (2)
- Chemelil Sugar (1)
- Kenya Methodist University (3)
- Mathare United (1)
- Oserian (2)
- St. Joseph (2)
- Top Fry AllStars (1)
- Zoo Kericho (2)

=== Fixtures ===
The first round ties were played from 20 June to 15 August. 64 teams from the entire Kenyan football league system as well as non-league teams began their campaigns at this stage.

20 June 2015	Nyakach United (4)	1–5	Tusker (1)	Unidentified
13:00 UTC+3		Report		Stadium: Unidentified

20 June 2015	Kanjeru United (3)	4–5	Border Lions (3)	Unidentified
13:00 UTC+3		Report		Stadium: Unidentified

20 June 2015	Administration Police (3)	5–1	Taqwa (5)	Kasarani, Nairobi
13:00 UTC+3	Suleiman 1', 44', 53'; Webale 3'; Wanyama 33'	Report	Aziz 11'	Stadium: Moi International Sports Centre

20 June 2015	APS Bomett (3)	w/o	Nairobi County (n)	Unidentified
14:00 UTC+3		Report		Stadium: Unidentified

Nairobi County failed to show up for the match. APS Bomett advance to the second round.

20 June 2015	Murang'a United (5)	1–2	G.F.E. 105 (3)	Unidentified
15:00 UTC+3		Report		Stadium: Unidentified

20 June 2015	Sofapaka (1)	2–0	Nakuru AllStars (1)	Unidentified
15:00 UTC+3		Report		Stadium: Unidentified

20 June 2015	Nairobi City Stars (1)	6–0	Transfoc (3)	Unidentified
15:00 UTC+3	Sanneh 13', 30', 50', 87'; Amboko 18', 62'	Report		Stadium: Unidentified

20 June 2015	Fresha (3)	2–0	Rhino (5)	Unidentified
15:00 UTC+3		Report		Stadium: Unidentified

20 June 2015	Nanyuki Sportiff (4)	0–3	Ushuru (1)	Unidentified
15:00 UTC+3		Report		Stadium: Unidentified

21 June 2015	Wazito (3)	3–0	Kiambu AllStars (4)	Kasarani, Nairobi
13:00 UTC+3	Vunyoli 10'; Lukige 68'; Wanjie 80'	Report		Stadium: Moi International Sports Centre

21 June 2015	Chemelil Sugar (1)	w/o	Bondo United (3)	Kisumu, Kisumu
13:00 UTC+3		Report		Stadium: Moi Stadium

Chemelil Sugar withdrew from the tournament. Bondo United advance to the second round.

21 June 2015	Muhoroni Young (4)	3–0	Zetech University (4)	Unidentified
14:00 UTC+3		Report		Stadium: Unidentified

21 June 2015	Vihiga United (3)	2–0	Silibwet (4)	Unidentified
14:00 UTC+3		Report		Stadium: Unidentified

21 June 2015	Timsales (3)	3–2	Vapor (4)	Unidentified
14:00 UTC+3		Report		Stadium: Unidentified

21 June 2015	Western Stima (1)	4–0	Boma (4)	Unidentified
15:00 UTC+3		Report		Stadium: Unidentified

21 June 2015	Bandari (1)	2–0	Savannah Cement (4)	Manyimbo, Mombasa
15:00 UTC+3	Mohammed 10'; Biraafya 13'	Report		Stadium: Mombasa Municipal Stadium

21 June 2015	Shabana (2)	2–3	Ulinzi Stars (1)	Kasarani, Nairobi
15:00 UTC+3	Selenga 10'; Ocholla 53'	Report	Serenge 25', 45'; Rutto 42' (pen.)	Stadium: Moi International Sports Centre

21 June 2015	Thika United (1)	6–0	KWS Amboseli (4)	Thika, Kiambu
15:00 UTC+3	Mukangula 10', 70', 82'; Mbugua 64'; Ochieng 66'; Aswani 90'	Report		Stadium: Thika Municipal Stadium

23 June 2015	Nakumatt (2)	3–1	Mumbi Nationale (3)	Shauri Moyo, Nairobi
15:00 UTC+3	Wekesa 21'; Onyango 53'; Nzuki 90+1'	Report	Wafula 1'	Stadium: Nairobi City Stadium

23 June 2015	Migori Talents (4)	0–2	Sony Sugar (1)	Unidentified
15:00 UTC+3		Report		Stadium: Unidentified

23 June 2015	Kenya Commercial Bank (1)	2–0	Finlays Horticulture (2)	Unidentified
15:00 UTC+3		Report		Stadium: Unidentified

23 June 2015	Posta Rangers (2)	2–0	Nanyuki Youth (5)	Shauri Moyo, Nairobi
15:00 UTC+3	Santos 6'; Gathu 30'	Report		Stadium: Nairobi City Stadium

24 June 2015	Modern Coast Rangers (2)	1–1 (4–1 p)	Magarini (3)	Manyimbo, Mombasa
13:00 UTC+3	Onyancha 19'	Report	Said 40' (pen.)	Stadium: Mombasa Municipal Stadium
	Penalties
	Buko (penalty scored); Abubakar (penalty scored); Kenga (penalty scored); Onyancha (penalty scored)		(penalty scored) Akida; (penalty missed) Abdala; (penalty missed) Mataza

24 June 2015	Kariobangi Sharks (2)	2–3	Police (3)	Shauri Moyo, Nairobi
13:00 UTC+3	Odongo 18', 89'	Report	Oluoch 2'; Rampei 64', 85'	Stadium: Nairobi City Stadium

24 June 2015	Kakamega Homeboyz (2)	0–0 (2–4 p)	Palos (3)	Kakamega, Kakamega
14:00 UTC+3		Report		Stadium: Bukhungu Stadium

24 June 2015	St. Joseph (2)	n/a	Agrochemical (3)
15:00 UTC+3

Both teams withdrew from the tournament.

24 June 2015	Gor Mahia (1)	3–0	Lang'ata Gremio (n)	Shauri Moyo, Nairobi
15:00 UTC+3	Kagere 13'; Odhiambo 62'; Glay 79'	Report		Stadium: Nairobi City Stadium

25 June 2015	Nzoia United (2)	0–0 (4–3 p)	Western Stima (1)	Bungoma, Bungoma
14:00 UTC+3		Report		Stadium: Sudi Stadium

27 June 2015	Talanta (2)	1–0	MOSCA (2)	Unidentified
13:00 UTC+3	Madi 48'	Report		Stadium: Unidentified

27 June 2015	Fortune SACCO (4)	w/o	Oserian (2)	Unidentified
14:00 UTC+3		Report		Stadium: Unidentified

Oserian withdrew from the tournament. Fortune SACCO advance to the second round.

4 July 2015	West Kenya Sugar (2)	1–0	Bidco United (2)	Kakamega, Kakamega
14:00 UTC+3	Shavanga 47'	Report		Stadium: Bukhungu Stadium

15 August 2015	A.F.C. Leopards (1)	2–1	Ligi Ndogo (2)	Shauri Moyo, Nairobi
15:00 UTC+3	Diallo 18'; Kagogo 60'	Report	Yidah 15'	Stadium: Nairobi City Stadium

== Bracket ==
Second round
19 September
Posta Rangers	0
Nzoia United	1
20 September
Tusker	5
G.F.E. 105	0
20 September
Muhoroni Youth	4
K.C.B.	2
25 August
Police	2
Western Stima	1
19 September
Bondo United	0
Bandari	3
30 August
APS Bomet	3
Border Lions	1
21 June
Shabana	2
Ulinzi Stars	3
19 September
A.F.C. Leopards	2
Wazito	1
29 August
Fortune SACCO	8
Vihiga United	7
20 September
Nairobi City Stars	1 (2)
Nakumatt	1 (4)
20 September
Sony Sugar	w/o
Thika United	—
20 September
Modern Coast	1 (3)
West Kenya Sugar	1 (4)
20 September
Gor Mahia	3
Ushuru	2
19 September
Talanta	0 (3)
Palos	0 (4)
20 September
Sofapaka	1 (3)
Admin. Police	1 (5)
29 August
Fresha	4
Timsales	1

Third round
10 October
Nzoia United	1 (5)
Tusker	1 (4)
11 October
Muhoroni Youth	1
Police	1
10 October
Bandari	2
APS Bomet	1
21 October
Ulinzi Stars	4
A.F.C. Leopards	0
10 October
Fortune SACCO	0
Nakumatt	4
10 October
Sony Sugar	2
West Kenya Sugar	1
14 October
Gor Mahia	4
Palos	2
10 October
Admin. Police	2
Fresha	0

Quarter-finals
8 November
Nzoia United	2
Muhoroni Youth	3
7 November
Bandari	1
Ulinzi Stars	0
14 November
Nakumatt	1 (3)
Sony Sugar	1 (1)
20 November
Gor Mahia	3
Admin. Police	1

Semi-finals
15 November
Muhoroni Youth	1
Bandari	4
9 December
Nakumatt	1 (4)
Gor Mahia	1 (2)

Final
13 December
Bandari	4
Nakumatt	2
Third place
13 December
Muhoroni Youth	w/o
Gor Mahia	—

== Second round ==
The second round ties were played from 25 August to 20 September. On 19 September, Thika United announced their withdrawal from the tournament, claiming they were not supposed to be paired against Sony Sugar in the second round.

25 August 2015	Police (3)	2–1	Western Stima (1)	Ruaraka, Nairobi
15:00 UTC+3	Maelo 68' (pen.); Rampei 79'	Report	Batambuze 87'	Stadium: Ruaraka Stadium

29 August 2015	Fortune SACCO (4)	8–7	Vihiga United (3)	Unidentified
15:00 UTC+3		Report		Stadium: Unidentified

29 August 2015	Fresha (3)	4–1	Timsales (3)	Unidentified
15:00 UTC+3		Report		Stadium: Unidentified

30 August 2015	APS Bomett (3)	3–0	Border Lions (3)	Unidentified
15:00 UTC+3		Report		Stadium: Unidentified

19 September 2015	Posta Rangers (2)	0–1	Nzoia United (2)	Kasarani, Nairobi
12:45 UTC+3		Report	Barasa 55'	Stadium: Moi International Sports Centre

19 September 2015	Talanta (2)	0–0 (3–4 p)	Palos (3)	Ruaraka, Nairobi
15:00 UTC+3		Report		Stadium: Ruaraka Stadium

19 September 2015	Bondo United (3)	0–3	Bandari (1)	Kisumu, Kisumu
15:00 UTC+3		Report	Mudde 2'; Kasadha 67'; Ndinya 72' (pen.)	Stadium: Moi Stadium

19 September 2015	A.F.C. Leopards (1)	2–1	Wazito (3)	Kasarani, Nairobi
15:00 UTC+3	Dodi 70'; Diallo 90'	Report	Omolo 50'	Stadium: Moi International Sports Centre

20 September 2015	Tusker (1)	5–0	G.F.E. 105 (3)	Kasarani, Nairobi
12:45 UTC+3	Kimani 10'; Otieno 39'; Were 73', 74', 84'	Report		Stadium: Moi International Sports Centre

20 September 2015	Sofapaka (1)	1–1 (3–5 p)	Administration Police (3)	Ruaraka, Nairobi
13:00 UTC+3	Baraza 38'	Report	Muhando 80'	Stadium: Ruaraka Stadium
	Penalties
	Mulumba (penalty scored); Odera (penalty scored); Mwaniki (penalty scored); Luvualu (penalty missed)		(penalty scored) Wabale; (penalty scored) Muhando; (penalty scored) Gathara; (penalty scored) Jakero; (penalty scored) Kavoo

20 September 2015	Muhoroni Youth (1)	0–0 (4–2 p)	Kenya Commercial Bank (1)	Muhoroni, Kisumu
15:00 UTC+3		Report		Stadium: Muhoroni Stadium
	Penalties
	Osama (penalty scored); Ocholla (penalty scored); Rono (penalty scored); Akinyemi (penalty scored)		(penalty scored) Ochieng; (penalty scored) Odhiambo; (penalty missed) Andrew Kulecho; (penalty missed) Warambo

20 September 2015	Nairobi City Stars (1)	1–1 (2–4 p)	Nakumatt (2)	Ruaraka, Nairobi
15:00 UTC+3	Imwene 69'	Report	Onyango 36'	Stadium: Ruaraka Stadium

20 September 2015	Sony Sugar (1)	w/o	Thika United (1)	Awendo, Migori
15:00 UTC+3		Report		Stadium: Green Stadium

Thika United withdrew from the tournament. Sony Sugar advance to the third round.

20 September 2015	Modern Coast Rangers (2)	1–1 (3–4 p)	West Kenya Sugar (2)	Ruaraka, Nairobi
15:00 UTC+3	Okello 75'	Report	Okoro 80'	Stadium: Ruaraka Stadium
	Penalties
	Makame (penalty scored); Bakari (penalty scored); Majepo (penalty scored); Mazera (penalty missed); Kibwana (penalty missed)		(penalty scored) Ochodo; (penalty scored) Onchiri; (penalty missed) Ochieng; (penalty scored) Matete; (penalty scored) Arasa

20 September 2015	Gor Mahia (1)	3–2	Ushuru (1)	Kasarani, Nairobi
15:00 UTC+3	Okoth 5'; Kagere 44', 74'	Report	Hassan 8', 55'	Stadium: Moi International Sports Centre

== Third round ==
The third round was scheduled to be played on the weekend of 10–11 October, but the match between Gor Mahia and Palos was pushed back to 14 October while the match between A.F.C. Leopards and Ulinzi Stars was pushed back to 21 October.

=== Muhoroni Youth vs. Police abandonment ===
During the match between Premier League side Muhoroni Youth and National Super League side Police, a penalty was awarded in the 85th minute after Police player David Okiki committed a handball inside his own penalty area. Just before the penalty was taken, an assistant coach from the Police bench ran onto the pitch and physically assaulted the referee, prompting the match to be halted for nearly 30 minutes before eventually being abandoned. Muhoroni Youth were subsequently awarded the win and advanced to the quarter-finals.

=== Fixtures ===
10 October 2015	Sony Sugar (1)	2–1	West Kenya Sugar (2)	Kisumu, Kisumu
13:00 UTC+3	Oduor 60', 72'	Report	Arasa 67'	Stadium: Moi Stadium

10 October 2015	Bandari (1)	2–1	APS Bomett (3)	Unidentified
15:00 UTC+3	F. Mohammed 30'; S. Mohammed 70'	Report	Wambugu 85'	Stadium: Unidentified

10 October 2015	Nzoia United (2)	1–1 (5–4 p)	Tusker (1)	Kisumu, Kisumu
15:00 UTC+3	Bikokwa 63' (pen.)	Report	Alwanga 80'	Stadium: Moi Stadium
	Penalties
	Juma (penalty scored); Bikokwa (penalty scored); Mucheri (penalty scored); Okine (penalty missed); Kwitonda (penalty missed); Mahero (penalty scored); Mangala (penalty scored)		(penalty scored) Kimani; (penalty scored) Atudo; (penalty missed) Osumba; (penalty scored) Alwanga; (penalty scored) Were; (penalty missed) Situma; (penalty missed) Mieno

10 October 2015	Fortune SACCO (4)	0–4	Nakumatt (2)	Kerugoya, Kirinyaga
15:00 UTC+3		Report	Nzuki 13' (pen.); Onyango 59'; Mohammed 62'; Juma 77'	Stadium: Kerugoya Stadium

10 October 2015	Administration Police (3)	2–0	Fresha (3)	Ruaraka, Nairobi
15:00 UTC+3	Wanyama 47'; Muhando 57'	Report		Stadium: Ruaraka Stadium

11 October 2015	Muhoroni Youth (1)	1–1	Police (3)	Muhoroni, Kisumu
15:00 UTC+3	Murai 76'	Report	Apollo 21'	Stadium: Muhoroni Stadium

The match was abandoned in the 85th minute. Muhoroni Youth awarded the win and advance to quarter-finals.

14 October 2015	Gor Mahia (1)	4–2	Palos (3)	Kasarani, Nairobi
15:00 UTC+3	Abondo 2', 52'; Olunga 30'; Shakava 73'	Report	Omanga 18', 66'	Stadium: Moi International Sports Centre

21 October 2015	Ulinzi Stars (1)	4–0	A.F.C. Leopards (1)	Nakuru, Nakuru
15:00 UTC+3	Ochieng 11'; Amuoka 45'; Onyango 46'; Makwata 88'	Report		Stadium: Afraha Stadium

== Quarter-finals ==
The draw for the quarter-finals was conducted on 15 October. Fixtures took place from 7–20 November.

7 November 2015	Bandari (1)	1–0	Ulinzi Stars (1)	Manyimbo, Mombasa
14:00 UTC+3	Abege 31'	Report		Stadium: Mombasa Municipal Stadium

8 November 2015	Nzoia United (2)	2–3	Muhoroni Youth (1)	Kisumu, Kisumu
15:00 UTC+3	Barasa 3', 64'	Report	Mohammed 36'; Akinyemi 74' (pen.); Ochieng 90'	Stadium: Moi Stadium

14 November 2015	Nakumatt (2)	1–1 (3–1 p)	Sony Sugar (1)	Madaraka Estate, Nairobi
15:00 UTC+3	Nzuki 58'	Report	Ochieng 56'	Stadium: Nyayo National Stadium
	Penalties
	Seif (penalty scored); Mosoti (penalty scored); Mohammed (penalty scored)		(penalty scored) Nondi; (penalty missed) Ochieng; (penalty missed) Chambiri; (penalty missed) Omondi

20 November 2015	Gor Mahia (1)	3–1	Administration Police (3)	Madaraka Estate, Nairobi
15:00 UTC+3	Odhiambo 18', 36'; Kagere 90+3'	Report	Mzee 55'	Stadium: Nyayo National Stadium

== Semi-finals ==
The draw for the semi-finals was conducted on 5 December, with the dates and venues for the third place play-off and the final also confirmed. Fixtures took place on 15 November and 9 December.

15 November 2015	Muhoroni Youth (1)	1–4	Bandari (1)	Madaraka Estate, Nairobi
15:00 UTC+3	Murai 89'	Report	Mohammed 7'; Mudde 53'; King'atua 55', 80'	Stadium: Nyayo National Stadium

9 December 2015	Nakumatt (2)	1–1 (4–2 p)	Gor Mahia (1)	Kasarani, Nairobi
15:00 UTC+3	Njoroge 55'	Report	Olunga 41'	Stadium: Moi International Sports Centre
	Penalties
	Juma (penalty scored); Mosoti (penalty scored); Seif (penalty scored); Nzuki (penalty scored)		(penalty missed) Kagere; (penalty missed) Walusimbi; (penalty scored) Abondo; (penalty scored) Agwanda

== Third place play-off ==
The third place play-off was scheduled to take place on 13 December. Muhoroni Youth were handed a walkover after Gor Mahia failed to show up for the match. Gor Mahia players reportedly boycotted the match over unpaid wages, and forfeited the KSh. 500,000/= in prize money meant for the fourth-placed team in the process. The club's secretary-general Ronald Ngala later released a statement saying Gor Mahia would not participate in future editions of the tournament until he saw an improvement in the way it is run.

13 December 2015	Muhoroni Youth (1)	w/o	Gor Mahia (1)	Madaraka Estate, Nairobi
13:15 UTC+3		Report		Stadium: Nyayo National Stadium

Gor Mahia failed to show up for the match. Muhoroni Youth win by default.

== Final ==
The final took place on 13 December.

13 December 2015	Bandari (1)	4–2	Nakumatt (2)	Madaraka Estate, Nairobi
15:00 UTC+3	Kimani 5' (pen.); Mudde 15'; Abege 19'; Masoud 43'	Report	Owino 80'; Imbalambala 83'	Stadium: Nyayo National Stadium
