= 2016 Kenyan Super Cup =

- Event: Kenyan Super Cup
Gor Mahia	Bandari
0	1
- Date: 6 February 2016
- Venue: Municipal Stadium, Mombasa, Kenya
- Referee: Raymond Onyango

The 2016 Kenyan Super Cup was a Kenyan football match contested by the 2015 Kenyan Premier League champions Gor Mahia and the 2015 FKF President's Cup champions Bandari. Bandari won my match 1–0 to deny Gor Mahia their third title in a row. As a result, Bandari claimed KSh. 750,000/= in prize money while Gor Mahia collected 500,000/= as runners-up.

Gor Mahia controversially skipped the medal ceremony after the match, with KPL chief executive officer Jack Oguda condemning the actions as "uncalled for" and "unsportsmanlike" the following day. He also announced that the club would face punishment, but did not specify what the punishment would be or when it would be delivered.

== Road to the Cup ==
=== 2015 Kenyan Premier League standings ===
Pos	Team	Pld	W	D	L	GF	GA	GD	Pts	Qualification or relegation
1	Gor Mahia (C, Q)	30	24	6	0	60	12	+48	78	Qualification for 2016 CAF Champions League (Note: The winners of the 2015 FKF President's Cup will qualify for the 2016 CAF Confederation Cup.)
2	Ulinzi Stars	30	17	7	6	41	25	+16	58	
3	Sofapaka	30	12	11	7	39	39	0	47	
4	Bandari	30	12	10	8	32	25	+7	46	
5	Tusker	30	12	8	10	46	28	+18	44	
6	Muhoroni Youth	30	11	11	8	31	36	−5	44	
7	A.F.C. Leopards	30	11	8	11	33	30	+3	41	
8	Ushuru	30	9	10	11	22	28	−6	37	
9	Mathare United	30	7	15	8	35	34	+1	36	
10	SoNy Sugar	30	9	8	13	23	26	−3	35	
11	Western Stima	30	9	8	13	25	31	−6	35	
12	Thika United	30	10	5	15	31	42	−11	35	
13	Chemelil Sugar	30	6	14	10	23	35	−12	32	
14	Nairobi City Stars	30	6	10	14	25	37	−12	28	
15	Kenya Commercial Bank (R)	30	6	8	16	34	48	−14	26	Relegation to 2016 National Super League
16	Nakuru AllStars (R)	30	4	11	15	34	58	−24	23	Relegation to 2016 National Super League

Updated to match(es) played on 1 November 2015. Source: Kenyan Premier League
Rules for classification: 1) points; 2) goal difference; 3) number of goals scored.
(C) Champions; (Q) Qualified for the phase indicated; (R) Relegated

=== 2015 FKF President's Cup bracket ===
Second round
19 September
Posta Rangers	0
Nzoia United	1
20 September
Tusker	5
G.F.E. 105	0
20 September
Muhoroni Youth	4
K.C.B.	2
25 August
Police	2
Western Stima	1
19 September
Bondo United	0
Bandari	3
30 August
APS Bomet	3
Border Lions	1
21 June
Shabana	2
Ulinzi Stars	3
19 September
A.F.C. Leopards	2
Wazito	1
29 August
Fortune SACCO	8
Vihiga United	7
20 September
Nairobi City Stars	1 (2)
Nakumatt	1 (4)
20 September
Sony Sugar	w/o
Thika United	—
20 September
Modern Coast	1 (3)
West Kenya Sugar	1 (4)
20 September
Gor Mahia	3
Ushuru	2
19 September
Talanta	0 (3)
Palos	0 (4)
20 September
Sofapaka	1 (3)
Admin. Police	1 (5)
29 August
Fresha	4
Timsales	1

Third round
10 October
Nzoia United	1 (5)
Tusker	1 (4)
11 October
Muhoroni Youth	1
Police	1
10 October
Bandari	2
APS Bomet	1
21 October
Ulinzi Stars	4
A.F.C. Leopards	0
10 October
Fortune SACCO	0
Nakumatt	4
10 October
Sony Sugar	2
West Kenya Sugar	1
14 October
Gor Mahia	4
Palos	2
10 October
Admin. Police	2
Fresha	0

Quarter-finals
8 November
Nzoia United	2
Muhoroni Youth	3
7 November
Bandari	1
Ulinzi Stars	0
14 November
Nakumatt	1 (3)
Sony Sugar	1 (1)
20 November
Gor Mahia	3
Admin. Police	1

Semi-finals
15 November
Muhoroni Youth	1
Bandari	4
9 December
Nakumatt	1 (4)
Gor Mahia	1 (2)

Final
13 December
Bandari	4
Nakumatt	2
Third place
13 December
Muhoroni Youth	w/o
Gor Mahia	—

== Match details ==
6 February 2016
15:00 UTC+3

Gor Mahia	0–1	Bandari
	Report	Kimani 68'

Mombasa Municipal Stadium, Manyimbo, Mombasa
Referee: Raymond Onyango

Gor Mahia
Bandari

GK	23	(Kenya) Boniface Oluoch
RB	5	(Kenya) Musa Mohammed
CB	26	(Kenya) Luke Ochieng
CB	18	(Kenya) Haron Shakava	(red card) 41'
LB	3	(Rwanda) Abouba Sibomana
RM	14	(Burundi) Karim Nizigiyimana
CM	6	(Kenya) Collins Okoth
LM	2	(Uganda) Godfrey Walusimbi
RW	24	(Kenya) Enock Agwanda		(substituted off) 83'
LW	25	(Kenya) George Odhiambo
CF	27	(Kenya) Jacob Keli		(substituted off) 69'
Substitutions:
MF	7	(Kenya) Ronald Otieno		(substituted on) 83'
FW	21	(Kenya) Erick Ouma		(substituted on) 69'
Manager:
(Scotland) Frank Nutall

GK	1	(Kenya) Wilson Obungu(c)
RB	2	(Kenya) Duncan Otewa
CB	5	(Kenya) David Gateri	(substituted off) 17'
CB	20	(Kenya) Mohamed Shariff
LB	19	(Democratic Republic of the Congo) Felly Mulumba
RM	15	(Kenya) Humphrey Okoti
CM	13	(Kenya) Shaban Kenga
CM	26	(Uganda) Musa Mudde
LM	17	(Kenya) Anthony "Muki" Kimani
CF	22	(Kenya) Edwin Lavatsa
CF	8	(Uganda) Dan Sserunkuma	(substituted off) 60'
Substitutions:
DF	4	(Kenya) Edwin Wafula	(substituted on) 17'
FW	11	(Kenya) Meshack Karani	(substituted on) 60'
Manager:
(Kenya) Twahir Muhiddin

Assistant referees

- Caroline Kiles
- Steven Adeya

Fourth official

- Judy Muhonja

Match commissioner

- Immaculate Akorot

Match rules

- 90 minutes.
- Penalty shoot-out if scores still level.
- Seven named substitutes, of which up to three could be used.
