= George Abege =

Ugandan footballer (born 1993)

George Abege Opio
Personal information
- Date of birth: 5 March 1993 (age 33)
- Place of birth: Koch-Goma, Uganda
- Height: 1.89 m (6 ft 2 in)
- Position: Striker

Team information
- Current team: Up Country Lions SC

Senior career*
Years	Team	Apps	(Gls)
2011	Maroons FC		
2012-13	SC Victoria University		
2014	Nairobi City Stars	20	(3)
2015-2016	Bandari F.C. (Kenya)	35	(6)
2017-2018	SoNy Sugar F.C.	31	(11)
2018-2019	FC Kariobangi Sharks	31	(7)
2020	Asante Kotoko S.C.	0	(0)
2020–	Up Country Lions SC	7	(0)

International career^{‡}
2012	Uganda	1	(0)
- * Club domestic league appearances and goals as of 19:31, 19 Apr 2022 (UTC) ‡ National team caps and goals as of 19:31, 19 Apr 2022 (UTC)

George Abege Opio (born 5 March 1993) is a Ugandan striker who currently plays for Sri Lanka's Up Country Lions SC. He formerly turned out for Kenyan Premier League sides Nairobi City Stars, Bandari F.C. (Kenya) and Kariobangi Sharks, as well as Ghana Premier League side Asante Kotoko S.C.

== Career ==
George started out at Maroon's FC Luzira, Luweroo United in Uganda before joining SC Victoria University in 2013. He then came to Kenya where he spent the 2014 season at Nairobi City Stars.

In 2015 he moved to Coastal side Bandari F.C. (Kenya) till the end of the 2016 season then head West to join SoNy Sugar F.C. for the 2017 and 2018 seasons.

He was back in Nairobi for the second half of the 2018 season after joining FC Kariobangi Sharks. At the start of that year, he had been linked with a move to another Kenyan premiership side Posta Rangers F.C. but for unknown reasons, he remained at SoNy.

At the end of the 2018/19 season, George moved to the Ghanaian league by joining Asante Kotoko S.C. on a three-year deal. However, after a few months, he left the club and was then linked with a move to Ugandan side URA FC. In April 2021 he moved to Sri Lanka's Up Country Lions SC.

== Continental ==
Abege first ventured into continental football with Bandari in 2016 by virtue of the club winning the domestic Cup in 2015. He made his debut as a second half susbtitue in the first leg of the preliminary round against DR Congo's FC Saint-Éloi Lupopo. He featured in the return leg before the team exited the 2016 CAF Confederation Cup qualifying rounds.

Abege was back at it with FC Kariobangi Sharks in 2019 featuring in two games in the 2018–19 CAF Confederation Cup qualifying rounds against Arta/Solar7. He scored his maiden continental goal in a 6–1 win in the first leg and scored once more in the 3–0 away win. He played two further games in the first round against Asante Kotoko F.C. who knocked Sharks out with a 2–1 aggregate win. The team signed him after the two games.

== International career ==
George earned his maiden, and only Ugandan international cap, in a friendly against South Sudan, on 10 July 2012 held at the Juba Stadium. In 2015, he openly stated his wish for more consideration at the National team fold.

== Honours ==
Victoria University

- Ugandan Cup: 2012–13

Bandari

- 2015 FKF President's Cup
- 2016 Kenyan Super Cup

Kariobangi Sharks

- 2018 FKF President's Cup
