= Farouk Shikalo =

Kenyan footballer

Personal information
- Date of birth: 10 December 1996 (age 29)
- Place of birth: Buret, Kenya
- Height: 1.85 m (6 ft 1 in)
- Position: Goalkeeper

Team information
- Current team: Mtibwa Sugar
- Number: 39

Senior career*
Years	Team	Apps	(Gls)
2012	Muhoroni Youth		
2013	KRA FC		
2013	Talanta		
2014–2015	Tusker		
2015–2016	Muhoroni Youth		
2017	Posta Rangers		
2018–2019	Bandari		
2019–2021	Young Africans		
2021	Mtibwa Sugar		

International career^{‡}
2019–	Kenya	1	(0)
- * Club domestic league appearances and goals as of 1 August 2020 ‡ National team caps and goals as of 1 August 2020

Farouk Shikalo (born 10 December 1996) is a Kenyan football goalkeeper who plays for Mtibwa Sugar.
