= Victor Majid =

Kenyan footballer (born 1992)

Personal information
- Date of birth: 21 April 1992 (age 34)
- Place of birth: Busia, Kenya
- Height: 1.65 m (5 ft 5 in)
- Position: Midfielder

Team information
- Current team: Mufulira Wanderers

Senior career*
Years	Team	Apps	(Gls)
2011	SoNy Sugar		
2012	Karuturi Sports		
2013–2014	Bandari		
2015	Kenya Commercial Bank		
2016–2017	Chemelil Sugar		
2017–2019	AFC Leopards		
2019	Prison Leopards		
2019–	Mufulira Wanderers		

International career^{‡}
2016–	Kenya	2	(0)
- * Club domestic league appearances and goals as of 10:03, 18 July 2019 (UTC) ‡ National team caps and goals as of 10:03, 18 July 2019 (UTC)

Victor Majid (born 21 April 1992) is a Kenyan international footballer who plays for Mufulira Wanderers, as a midfielder.

== Career ==
Born in Busia, Majid has played club football for SoNy Sugar, Karuturi Sports, Bandari, Kenya Commercial Bank, Chemelil Sugar and A.F.C. Leopards.

He made his international debut for Kenya in 2016.
