= Dan Makori =

Kenyan footballer (born 1986)

Daniel Makori Chacha (born 7 February 1986) is a Kenyan former footballer who played as a forward. He is currently the chief executive officer of the Kenya Footballers Welfare Association.

== Playing career ==
Makori, trained teacher by profession, played in the Kenyan Premier League for several clubs, including Gor Mahia, KCB FC, Western Stima, Bidco United, Nairobi City Stars and Ushuru.

== Football administration ==
Following his retirement from active football, Makori joined KEFWA, the national players' union affiliated to FIFPRO, and rose through the organization's ranks from an Education Officer to being appointed the chief executive officer. Beyond his role at KEFWA, Makori also undertakes coaching roles.
