= Daniel Otieno =

Kenyan footballer (born 1998)

Daniel Otieno Okoth (born 13 October 1998) is a Kenyan professional footballer who plays as a left winger or as an attacking midfielder. He has featured for several Kenyan Premier League clubs including Nairobi City Stars, Muhoroni Youth, Sony Sugar and Mathare United.

Otieno, fondly referred to as Van Persie after the famed Dutch forward, started out at Gor Youth, the farm team of Kenya's record league title holders Gor Mahia. He was linked with a move to the Kenyan champions Gor Mahia in March 2023 following his exploits at Mathare United.

After several years at Mathare United, Otieno went on to join top flight side Sofapaka in August 2023.
