= Hassan Wario =

Kenyan civil servant and politician

Hassan Wario Arero
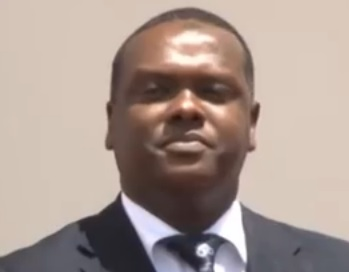
- Wario in 2013

Cabinet Secretary for Sports, Culture and the Arts
- In office 15 May 2013 – February 2018
- President: Uhuru Kenyatta
- Succeeded by: Rashid Echesa

Personal details
- Born: 24 November 1970 (age 55)
- Children: 2
- Education: University of Nairobi (BA); University of East Anglia (PhD)

Hassan Gurach Wario Arero (born 24 November 1970) is a Kenyan civil servant and politician, who has been Kenyan Ambassador to Austria since 2018. He was Cabinet Secretary for Sports, Culture, and the Arts of Kenya from 2013 to 2018.

Arero hails from the Borana community. He was educated at the University of Nairobi (BA, Anthropology, 1995), and a master's degree in Advanced Arts of Africa, Oceania, and the Americas at the University of East Anglia. He completed his PhD in anthropology at the University of East Anglia in 2013.

== Abuse of office charges ==
Wario was charged with corruption and theft during his tenure as a Minister of Sports. The offenses occurred during the 2016 Olympics. He was found guilty of misappropriation of $490,000 in taxpayer funds, by Milimani Anti-Corruption Courts in Nairobi on September 15, 2021. In what is described as a miscarriage of justice by the judiciary, he was surprisingly only fined $33,000; by paying the fine, he avoided a six-year prison term.
