= Oscar Mbugua =

Kenyan footballer (born 1983)

Oscar Mbugua (born 23 November 1983) is a former Kenyan defender cum midfielder who featured for several clubs in the Kenyan Premier League clubs including Nairobi City Stars, Gor Mahia, and Ushuru.

== Career ==
Mbugua began his senior football career with World Hope FC in 2008 and stayed at the club as it changed names to Nairobi City Stars from 2009 till the 2012 season when, after all the rumours, he moved to Gor Mahia. After his stint with Gor Mahia, where he earned just two games, he returned to City Stars to feature for another four topsy turvy seasons from January 2013.

He featured prominently for City Stars and rose to the rank of captain leading by example of several occasions. He moved to Ushuru midway through the 2016 season where he went on to accumulate his overall Kenyan premier league games to over 130 appearances. He continued to feature for the side even after their relegation at the end of the 2016 season.
