= Richard Pinto Tamale =

Ugandan football manager

Richard Pinto Tamale Kiwanuka
Personal information
- Full name: Richard Pinto Tamale Kiwanuka
- Date of birth: 12 November 1973 (age 52)
- Position: Defender

Richard Tamale Kiwanuka (born November 11, 1973) is a former Ugandan defender, and football manager who handled Kenyan Premier League sides Nairobi City Stars and Muhoroni Youth F.C. in 2016.

He previously coached Ugandan sides Lira United, Entebbe FC, Kampala Kids League (KKL), Bunamwaya, Kajjansi United and Uganda Premier League side Paidha Black Angels FC.
