= Bruno Sserunkuma =

Ugandan footballer

Bruno Sserunkuma (3 February 1991 – March 2025) is a former Ugandan professional footballer who featured as a winger and attacking midfielder for clubs in the Uganda and Kenyan premier league, among them Express, Nairobi City Stars, Bandari, and Vihiga United. He died in March 2025.

== Club career ==
Sserunkuma began his career in Uganda, turning out for Kasenyi FC and Aurum Roses moving to Kenya in 2012 to join Nairobi City Stars. He was signed following the departure of fellow Ugandan forward Dan Sserunkuma becoming one of several Ugandan players to feature for the Nairobi-based club. Bruno later joined Bandari. Following his departure from Bandari, Sserunkuma joined Vihiga United and was subsequently linked with moves to Zambian Premier League clubs ZESCO United and Zanaco.

In January 2018, Sserunkuma returned to Uganda and signed for Express FC on a two-year contract as a free agent.
