= Intercity =

Intercity or Inter-city may refer to:

- Inter-city rail services
  - InterCity, a general term for certain long-distance passenger services throughout Europe
  - InterCity (British Rail), a brand used by British Rail
    - The Inter-City, a named express passenger service in England (1950-1965)
    - InterCity 125, a diesel-powered high speed train serving Great Britain (1976-date)
    - InterCity 225, an electric-powered high speed train serving Great Britain (1990-date)
    - InterCity 250, a cancelled high speed train project in Great Britain (1990-1993)
  - InterCity (Iarnród Éireann), serving the Republic of Ireland
  - Intercity (Deutsche Bahn), serving Germany
  - Intercity (Nederlandse Spoorwegen), serving the Netherlands
  - InterCity (Switzerland), serving Switzerland
  - Intercity-Express, high-speed rail serving Germany and its surrounding countries
  - PKP Intercity, serving Poland
  - NSB InterCity Express, serving Norway
  - Intercity Express (Indian Railways), multiple routes called "Intercity Express"
  - High-speed rail in China, multiple routes called "Intercity Railway"
  - Metropolitan Intercity Railway Company, serving Japan starting in 1991
  - KTM Intercity, serving Peninsular Malaysia, Singapore and Thailand
  - Intercity services operated by Sydney Trains in Australia
- Train types
  - InterCity Express (Queensland Rail), used in Australia
  - NS Intercity Materieel, used in The Netherlands
- Intercity bus services
  - Inter-City Bus Terminal (Reading, Pennsylvania), a bus station in the United States
  - InterCity (New Zealand)
  - Ventura Intercity Service Transit Authority, serving California, USA
- Companies, organisations or services with "Intercity" or "Inter-city" in their name
  - CF Intercity, a Spanish football club
  - Dublin and Belfast Inter-City Cup, a soccer competition in Ireland
  - Intercity baseball tournament, in Japan
  - Intercity Bridge, in Minnesota, USA
  - Inter-Cities Fairs Cup, a European football competition
  - Inter City Firm, an English football hooligan firm
  - Intercity Football League, in Taiwan
  - Intercity Golden Gloves, amateur boxing tournament
  - Inter-City League, ice hockey league in England
  - Intercity Shopping Centre, Ontario, Canada
  - Intercity Viaduct, bridge over the Kansas River, USA
