= Emmanuel Ngama =

Burundian footballer

Personal information
- Full name: Emmanuel Ngama
- Date of birth: July 1, 1992 (age 34)
- Place of birth: Bujumbura, Burundi
- Height: 1.75 m (5 ft 9 in)
- Position: Midfielder

Team information
- Current team: URA F.C-Uganda
- Number: 24

Youth career
- 2004–2007: Atlético Olympic Bujumbura

Senior career*
Years	Team	Apps	(Gls)
2007–2008	Atlético Olympic Bujumbura	20	(0)
2008–2009	FCV Dender EH	3	(0)
2009–present	Atlanta Lions		

International career
2008–	Burundi	1	(0)
- * Club domestic league appearances and goals as of 17 July 2009

Emmanuel Ngama (born July 1, 1992, in Bujumbura) is a Burundian football player currently playing for Atlanta Lions.

== Career ==
He joined on 1 July 2008 from Atlético Olympic Bujumbura (Burundi) to FCV Dender EH. He played only 3 games for FCV Dender EH and joined in summer 2009 to Atlanta Lions.

== International career ==
Ngama played his first international game on 6 September 2009 against Seychelles national football team.
