= Fred Nkata =

Ugandan footballer (born 1993)

Fred Nkata (born 6 May 1993) is a Ugandan footballer who played as a defender, primarily as a left-back. He featured professionally in Uganda, Kenya and the Republic of the Congo, turning out for clubs including Gor Mahia, Tusker, Bandari, Nairobi City Stars, SC Villa and AS Otoho.

== Club career ==
Nkata began his career in Uganda, featuring for Buganda Regional Bombo United F.C. before moving to SC Villa where he spent two seasons. He then moved to Kira Young FC in January 2015 on a two-year deal but made a move after just six months to Kenya in the mid transfer window of July 2015 to join Nairobi City Stars on loan to play under his father Paul Nkata who was the coach.

From City Stars he joined Tusker at the start of the 2016 season before heading to the Coast to Bandari in the mid window of the same year and went on to stay at the club till December 2020.

He then joined Gor Mahia in early 2021 and went on to win the domestic cup that sent the club to the CAF Confederations Cup. From Gor he moved to Congolese club AS Otoho.

== Match-fixing ban ==
In 2026, Nkata received a five-year ban from football after being found guilty by FUFA of involvement in match manipulation.
