= Jerry Santos =

Kenyan footballer (born 1988)

Personal information
- Full name: Jerry Santos
- Date of birth: 17 December 1988 (age 37)
- Place of birth: Nairobi, Kenya
- Height: 1.85 m (6 ft 1 in)
- Position: Midfielder

Youth career
- 2004–2005: Dandora Youth

Senior career*
Years	Team	Apps	(Gls)
2006	Dandora Youth	23	(11)
2007–2009	Tusker	57	(9)
2009–2011	Simba SC	0	(0)
2011	Hoàng Anh Gia Lai	3	(2)
2011–2012	Tusker	23	(4)
2012–2015	Coastal Union	27	(6)
2015	Gor Mahia		
2015–	Posta Rangers		

International career
2009–	Kenya	9	(0)
- * Club domestic league appearances and goals

Jerry Santos (born 17 December 1988) is a Kenyan footballer who currently plays for Posta Rangers as a midfielder.

== Career ==
=== Youth ===
Santos started playing football at the age of eight in the MYSA league in Dandora He then joined the Nairobi Provincial league with Dandora Youth. Santos was later discovered playing for Dandora Youth in a Nairobi tournament known as Extreme Super Eight organized by Extreme Sports Ltd in 2006. Dandora Youth went on to win the tournament captained by Santos by beating Huruma United 1–0 in the finals held at the Nyayo Stadium.

=== Professional ===
Soon after Dandora Youth, Jerry was snapped up by Tusker FC in August 2006 and completed three seasons with the club winning the 2007 Kenya Premier League crown in 2007 and lifting the Regional Club Championship, Kagame Inter-Club Cup in 2008.

At the close of the 2009 season, Jerry signed a two-year contract for Tanzania giants Simba SC on 30 November 2009 and joined the club soon after the annual CECAFA Cup concluded in Nairobi on 13 December 2009.

On 18 August 2011, Jerry signed to play for Vietnamese V-League side Hoàng Anh Gia Lai.

In December 2011, Jerry joined Albanian side KF Tirana on a two-and-a-half-year deal.

== International career ==
Santos, a defensive midfielder, earned his first call up and first cap for Kenya in friendly game against Malaysia U23 in Kuala Lumpur on 12 March 2009.

Jerry's second cap was against Bahrain on 26 August 2009 and the third was on 3 November 2009 a game Kenya lost 5–0 to Kuwait in a friendly game played in Cairo.

Jerry was in Camp with the National team waiting in readiness for the upcoming 33rd edition of the regional CECAFA senior challenge Cup that was played from 28 November to 13 December 2009.

On 28 November 2009 Jerry picked up his fourth cap when Kenya clashed with Zambia in the opener of the CECAFA Cup at the Nyayo National Stadium in Nairobi. He is offer regarded as one of the best midfielders to don the national team jersey.
