= Shabana =

Shabana is a feminine given name and surname of Arabic origin. People named Shabana include:

== Given name ==
- Shabana (actress) (born 1950), Bangladeshi actress
- Shabana (dancer) (died 2009), a Pakistani dancer killed by the Taliban
- Shabana Akhtar (born 1972), Pakistani athlete
- Shabana Azeez (born 1996), Australian actress
- Shabana Azmi (born 1950), Indian actress
- Shabana Bakhsh (born 1981), Scottish actress
- Shabana Rehman Gaarder (1976–2022), Norwegian comedian
- Shabana Mahmood (born 1980), British politician

== Surname ==
- Mohammed Shabana (born 1931), Egyptian Air Force commander
- Muhammad Shabana (died 2025), a Hamas leader
