= Saad Musa =

South Sudanese footballer (born 1995)

Personal information
- Full name: Abdallah Asad Musa
- Date of birth: 6 August 1995 (age 31)
- Place of birth: Mumias, Kenya
- Height: 1.73 m (5 ft 8 in)
- Position: Attacking midfielder

Team information
- Current team: AFC Leopards
- Number: 40

Senior career*
Years	Team	Apps	(Gls)
2014–2015	Nairobi City Stars	24	(0)
2015–2018	Thika United	63	(3)
2018–	AFC Leopards	18	(0)

International career^{‡}
2020–	South Sudan	2	(0)
- * Club domestic league appearances and goals as of 29 May 2019 ‡ National team caps and goals as of 16 November 2020

Abdallah Asad Musa (born 6 August 1995), known as Saad Musa, is a South Sudanese footballer who plays as an attacking midfielder for Kenyan Premier League club AFC Leopards and the South Sudan national team.
