= Neville Pudo =

Kenyan footballer (1956–2020)

Neville Ovi Pudo (22 February 1956 – 4 December 2020) was a Kenyan football player, coach, and administrator who was associated Hakati Sportiff, Black Mamba, and Kenya Breweries (present day Tusker), and Nairobi City Stars.

== Playing career ==
As a player Pudo turned out as a forward for Black Mamba and Hakati Sportiff before joining Kenya Breweries FC (now Tusker FC). In 1977 he earned a callup to the Kenya national team. After retiring Pudo moved to management at Tusker where he served as team manager, assistant coach and as interim coach between 2008 and 2012. While at Tusker, he was named the runners-up team manager of the year in 2011, and was nominated for the Awards in 2015. He moved to Nairobi City Stars in 2012 as a team manager across multiple seasons in the Kenyan Premier League and later the Kenyan National Super League.

He died in his house on the morning of a matchday 2 tie in the 2020-21 FKF Premier League season due to suspected cardiac arrest. He was later honored him posthumously during the club's promotion awards ceremony.
