= Peter Jabuya =

Peter Jabuya is a Kenyan football administrator who served Nairobi City Stars in different leadership capacities including secretary, chairman and owner for over ten years till the year 2019.

== Career ==
Under Jabuya, City Stars gained recognition as a club that developed untested players from the informal sectors, and for handing several coaches opportunities at the club, even though he endured tough times that threatened the survival of the team.

He exited football upon the sale and handover of the club to new owner Jonathan Jackson in April 2019.
