= Levy Muaka =

Kenyan footballer (born 1988)

Levy Muaka Mutsotso
Personal information
- Full name: Levy Muaka Mutsotso
- Date of birth: 30 December 1988 (age 37)
- Height: 1.70 m (5 ft 7 in)
- Position: Midfielder

Youth career
- 2005: Securicor Kitale

Senior career*
Years	Team	Apps	(Gls)
2006-08	World Hope	23	(1)
2009	Nairobi City Stars	11	(0)
2009	Sofapaka F.C.	5	(0)
2010	Nairobi City Stars	27	(4)
2011	Tusker F.C.	8	(0)
2012	Nairobi City Stars	12	(1)
2014-15	Nairobi City Stars	25	(0)
- * Club domestic league appearances and goals

Levy Muaka Mutsotso is a retired Kenyan midfielder who featured for Kenyan Premier League sides Nairobi City Stars, Sofapaka F.C., Tusker F.C. and the kenya national football team as a winger.

== Club career ==
Levy joined Nairobi City Stars from Securicor Kitale in 2006 and served the club for two-and-a-half seasons before joining Sofapaka F.C. for the remainder of the 2009 season.

He returned to Nairobi City Stars in 2010 and for part of the 2012 season. He was back for the last part of the 2014 season, and the entire 2015 season. In 2011 he featured for Tusker F.C.

Between 2012 and 2014, Levy is believed to have gone abroad in search of opportunities. Earlier in 2010 and 2011, he had been linked with trial moves to South Africa and France.

Levy won two Kenyan Premier League titles with Sofapaka F.C. in 2009 and with Tusker F.C. in 2011.

== International ==
Levy earned four national team caps between 2010 and 2011. He made, and scored, on his debut on 18 Aug 2010 as kenya national football team beat host Ethiopia 3-0 in a friendly at Addis Ababa Stadium.

== Honours ==
=== Club ===
Sofapaka

- Kenyan Premier League title:(2009)

Tusker

- Kenyan Premier League title:(2011)
