= Jimmy Bageya =

Ugandan footballer (born 1999)

Personal information
- Full name: Jimmy Bageya
- Date of birth: 20 November 1999 (age 26)
- Place of birth: Entebbe-Wakiso
- Height: 1.70 m (5 ft 7 in)
- Position: Striker

Senior career*
Years	Team	Apps	(Gls)
- Nairobi City Stars
- * Club domestic league appearances and goals

Jimmy Bageya is a Ugandan striker who turned out for Kenyan Premier League side Nairobi City Stars.

== Career ==
Bageya formerly turned out for Kenyan Premier League sides Gor Mahia F.C., A.F.C. Leopards, Bandari F.C. (Kenya), Nakumatt FC and Kakamega Homeboyz F.C. He has also played club football for Police FC (Uganda), Electrogaz (Rwanda), BDF (Botswana), Krabi FC (Thailand) and NAPSA Stars (Zambia).

== Honours ==
=== Club ===
Nairobi City Stars

- National Super League

(gold) Champions (1): 2019-20

=== Individual ===
Nairobi City Stars

- Kenyan Premier League

(gold) Player of the month (1): Oct 2015
