= Jesse Were =

Kenyan footballer (born 1989)

Jesse Ware
Personal information
- Full name: Jesse Jackson Were
- Date of birth: 19 April 1989 (age 37)
- Place of birth: Nairobi, Kenya
- Height: 1.86 m (6 ft 1 in)
- Position: Striker

Team information
- Current team: Zesco United
- Number: 18

Senior career*
Years	Team	Apps	(Gls)
2011–2012	Mathare United	49	(13)
2013–2015	Tusker	86	(46)
2016–2022	ZESCO United F.C.		(83)
2022-2024	Kansanshi Dynamos FC	30	(7)
2024-	Zesco United	0	(0)

International career^{‡}
2013–	Kenya	26	(1)
- * Club domestic league appearances and goals as of 10 February 2023 ‡ National team caps and goals as of 18 November 2019

Jesse Jackson Were (Swahili pronunciation: [ˈwɛrɛ]; born 19 April 1989) is a Kenyan professional footballer who plays as a striker for Kenyan Premier League club Police Fc and the Kenya national team. He previously played for Mathare United and Tusker F.C. Joined Kansanshi dynamos in 2021.

== Club ==
As of 10 February 2023

Appearances and goals by club, season and competition
Club	Season	League			National cup		Continental		Other		Total	
Club	Season	Division	Apps	Goals	Apps	Goals	Apps	Goals	Apps	Goals	Apps	Goals
TP Mazembe	2017–18	Linafoot					6 (Note: Appearances in CAF Champions League)	2	1 (Note: Appearance in CAF Super Cup)	0		
TP Mazembe	2018–19	Linafoot		24			12	5				
TP Mazembe	2019–20	Linafoot		12			10	7				
TP Mazembe	Total						38	14			85	57
