= Mombasa Municipal Stadium =

Sports venue in Mombasa, Kenya

Coordinates: 4°2′41″S 39°39′59″E

- Interactive map of Mombasa Municipal Stadium
- Full name: Mombasa Municipal Stadium
- Location: Mombasa, Kenya
- Owner: County Government of Mombasa
- Operator: Mombasa County Government
- Capacity: 10,000

Tenants
- Bandari F.C. Congo United F.C.

Municipal Stadium is a multi-purpose stadium in Mombasa, Kenya. It is used mostly for football matches and holds 10,000 people.
