= Ruaraka Stadium =

Sports venue in Nairobi, Kenya

Ruaraka Grounds
- Interactive map of Ruaraka Grounds
- Full name: Ruaraka Grounds
- Location: Nairobi, Kenya
- Coordinates: 1.23459°S 36.88060°E
- Capacity: 4,000
- Surface: Grass

Tenant
- Tusker F.C.

Ruaraka Stadium, also known as Ruaraka Grounds, is a multi-purpose stadium in Nairobi, Kenya. It used mostly for football matches and is the primary home stadium of Tusker F.C. The stadium holds 4,000 people.
