= John Amboko =

Kenyan footballer (born 1985)

Personal information
- Date of birth: 6 April 1985 (age 41)
- Height: 1.75 m (5 ft 9 in)
- Position: Defender

Senior career*
Years	Team	Apps	(Gls)
2003–2008	World Hope	23	(0)
2009–2010	Nairobi City Stars	44	(0)
2011	A.F.C. Leopards	16	(0)
2012–2016	Nairobi City Stars	138	(0)
2017	Nairobi City Stars		

Managerial career
- 2005–2017: Vaport Sports
- 2017: Nairobi City Stars (interim, ass.)
- 2018–2019: Nairobi City Stars (coach)
- 2021: Nairobi City Stars (interim)
- 2021–2022: Nairobi City Stars (assistant)
- * Club domestic league appearances and goals

John Amboko (born 6 April 1985) is a former Kenyan football defender who is currently an assistant coach at Kenyan Premier League side Nairobi City Stars.

== Career ==
=== Player ===
Amboko was a long-serving captain who spent his entire playing career at Nairobi City Stars from 2003 until his full retirement in 2017, save for the 2011 season when he turned out for A.F.C. Leopards.

He announced his retirement as a player following Nairobi City Stars relegation at the end of the 2016 season but later rescinded the decision to feature in the 2017 season.

=== Coaching ===
Alongside his playing career, Amboko coached lower-tier side Vapor Sports that was financed by his workplace Vapor Ministries up until the 2017 season. At some point in the 2017 season, he became Nairobi City Stars interim coach, then assistant coach, while the team featured in second-tier National Super League.

He was the head coach for the rest of the 2018 season and parts of the 2018–19 season. Towards the end of the 2020–21 season, he was named coach towards the close of the season, following the departure of Sanjin Alagic due to the end of his contract.

At the start of the 2021–22 season, Amboko upgraded his coaching badge to CAF B, as he became an assistant coach following the arrival of Nicholas Muyoti as head coach.

== Honours ==
World Hope

- Kenyan Nationwide League: 2003–4,
- FKF President's Cup: 2005

Nairobi City Stars

- Kenyan National Super League: 2019–20
