= Ebrimah Sanneh =

Gambian footballer

Personal information
- Full name: Ebrimah Sanneh
- Date of birth: 22 February 1995 (age 31)
- Place of birth: Gambia
- Height: 1.83 m (6 ft 0 in)
- Position: Striker

Youth career
- 2012–2013: Real de Banjul

Senior career*
Years	Team	Apps	(Gls)
2014-15	Nairobi City Stars	25	(11)
2016	Ushuru F.C.	7	(4)
2017-18	F.C. Kariobangi Sharks	32	(4)
2019-2022	Nairobi City Stars	22	(15)
- * Club domestic league appearances and goals as of 4 Oct 2024

Ebrimah Sanneh is a Gambian striker who turned out for Kenyan Premier League side Nairobi City Stars.

== Career ==
Sanneh formerly featured for Gambian side Real de Banjul FC, Kenyan topflight sides F.C. Kariobangi Sharks, and Ushuru F.C.
