= Green Stadium, Awendo =

Multi-purpose stadium in Awendo, Kenya

Green Stadium
- Full name: Sonysugar Green Stadium
- Location: Awendo, Kenya
- Capacity: 5,000

Tenant
- Sony Sugar F.C.

Green Stadium is a multi-purpose stadium in Awendo, Kenya. It used mostly for football matches and is the home stadium of Sony Sugar. The stadium holds 5,000 people.
