= Awendo =

Town in Migori County, Kenya

Coordinates: 0°54′28.7″S 34°31′54.2″E

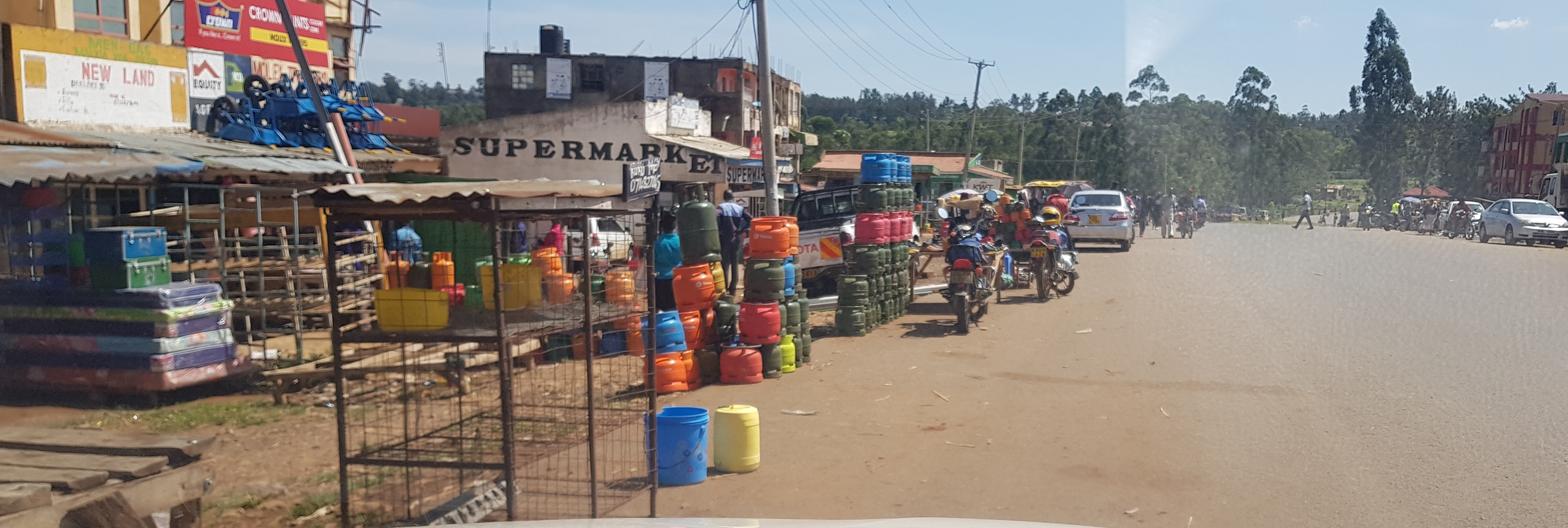
The A1 road and businesses in central Awendo

Awendo, also sometimes referred to as Sare–Awendo or Sare, is a town in Migori County, Kenya. It was founded during the colonial era on the site of an earlier precolonial trading centre. The South Nyanza Sugar Company's factory, which opened in 1980, is a major source of income for Awendo and the surrounding region.

== Location ==
Awendo is situated in the west of Kenya in Migori County, around 40 kilometres (25 mi) from the shores of Lake Victoria. Prior to the 2013 local government reorganisation, the town was in the now defunct Nyanza Province. The town is on the A1 road, between Kisii and Migori towns. The road is a major thoroughfare linking Kisumu and Nairobi with the Tanzanian border at Isebania. Awendo lies on the River Sare and is also close to the River Kuja. Awendo is one of four designated municipalities within Migori County. The urban core of the town covers an area of 5.96 square kilometres (2.30 sq mi), while the wider municipality has an area of 117.2 square kilometres (45.3 sq mi).

== History ==
Awendo has been located at a junction of trading routes since pre-colonial times, and the town is thought to have been a centre of trade since at least the early 19th century. When the British government established the East Africa Protectorate in Kenya in the latter half of that century, they set up an office in the Awendo area, which was used to extract taxes and carryout registration of local animals. Indian traders began arriving in the area shortly after this and set up a rudimentary market where they sold goods. The arrival of the A1 road through the town, which followed the same north–south route used by previous traders, saw significant expansion of the town. A primary school and health centre were set up by European missionary workers and the market expanded.

In 1976, the South Nyanza Sugar Company (Sony Sugar) was formed, which constructed a large sugar factory built close to Awendo that opened in 1980. The project cost 30 million GBP in an area which had previously been dominated by subsistence farming without significant investment in agriculture. Local farmers were recruited to grow the sugar for the factory and were paid 9,000 KES per hectare of crop, enabling them to improve their housing. The company was operated on behalf of the Kenyan government by Mahendra Mehta, an Indian Ugandan who had been expelled by Idi Amin. The factory was not a success initially, but output improved following a development project which took place between 1986 and 1996, improving the factory and investing in equipment for farmers.

== Governance ==
The town of Awendo is governed by the Awendo Municipal board, which operates under the auspices of the Migori County government. This is headed by the municipal manager and also features a board, with offices on the A1 road in the town.

== Sport ==
- Green Stadium, a multi-purpose stadium with a capacity of 5,000 people, is located in Awendo.
- Sony Sugar, an association football club plays its home games at the stadium.
