= Ushuru F.C. =

Kenyan football club

Ushuru
- Full name: Ushuru Football Club
- Nickname: The Taxmen
- Founded: 2006
- Ground: Public Service Grounds; Nairobi, Kenya
- Capacity: 5,000
- Chairman: Clive Palmer
- Manager: Mike Mulvey
- League: Kenyan Premier League
- 2015: 8th

Ushuru Football Club is a Kenyan professional football club based in Nairobi. The club plays its home games at the Public Service Grounds, which have a capacity of 5,000.

The Kenya Revenue Authority is the club's main sponsor, and until 11 October 2014, the club was known as Kenya Revenue Authority Football Club.
