= SoNy Sugar F.C. =

Kenyan football club

SoNy Sugar
- Full name: SoNy Sugar Football Club
- Founded: 1982; 44 years ago
- Ground: Green Stadium; Awendo, Kenya
- Capacity: 5,000
Home colours	Away colours

SoNy Sugar Football Club is an association football club based in Awendo, Kenya. It was competing in the Kenyan Premier League, the top tier of the Kenyan football league system, and played its home games at the Sony Green Stadium. Due to failure attributed to financial challenges facing the sponsor, the club was relegated from the Kenya Premier League. Though not formally disbanded, it has low key activities confined at its home base.

== History ==
It was expelled from Kenya Football League in 2019 after failing to participate in 3 of its matches. In the 2005–06 season, the club clinched its first league title with a record that included over 20 wins. The sugar millers were led to their first premier league trophy by head coach Francis Baraza who had just taken over from Peter Otieno 'Bassanga'. Most of the players were casual workers at the sugar milling factory. Some of the players who played a key role in the title winning season are Zak (GK), Ayoo (DEF), Noah Abich (DEF), Fred Ajwang (MF), Marwa Chamberi (ST), Jockins Atudo (DEF), Victor Ali Abondo (MF), Neto (MF), Chimbuzi (DEF), Onkangi (ST), Zakayo, Sylvester Wanyama DEF, Emmanuel Geno, Salim Babu (MF), Tom AKA Tosh, Oduor Alfred, Adan, Willis AKA Awilo, Dennis Chweya, Waweru, Imbusi and Zachary Onyango.

Formed in 1982, the club is owned by South Nyanza Sugar Company and earned promotion to the Kenyan Premier League in 1993.

== Achievements ==
- Kenyan Premier League: 1

2006
