= Bandari F.C. (Kenya) =

Kenyan football club

- Full name: Bandari Football Club
- Nicknames: Al Bandar; Dockers
- Founded: 1986; 40 years ago (as Bandari FC)
- Ground: Mbaraki Sports Club
- Capacity: 15,000
- Owner: Kenya Ports Authority
- Chairman: Eng. Stephen Thoya
- Head Coach: Benard Mwalala (Coach)
- League: Kenyan Premier League
- 2025–26: 12th

Bandari Football Club is a Kenyan football club based in Mombasa. The club plays their home games at the Mbaraki Sports Club and the Mombasa County Stadium (the latter having four times greater seating capacity), and compete in the Kenyan Premier League after finishing the 2012 FKF Division One season as champions of Zone A.

The team played from 1960 to 1978 as LASCO Football Club, followed by an eight-year run as Cargo Football Club. In 1985, the club merged with the Kenya Ports Authority team to form Bandari FC.

The club had played previously in the Kenyan Premier League, but was relegated after the 1997 season. Bandari was the first runners up in the KPL 2017,2018 and won the KPL SportPesa Supercup 2018 to earn a CAF CONFEDERATION CUP Qualifications spot.

The Dockers were placed against Al Ahly Shendi of Sudan and drew 0–0 on home turf before drawing 1–1 away to Shendi in Sudan eliminating the Sudan-based side. The second round they were placed with US Ben Guardane of Tunisia, and eliminated them in similar fashion The team was disbanded in 1999. It was revived in 2004 and rapidly promoted from lower leagues back to the premier league. The club reached the final on Kenyan Cup in 1986 but was beaten by Gor Mahia (who qualified for the African Cup Winners' Cup and won the tournament).

== Honours ==
- FKF President's Cup: 1

2015

- Kenyan Super Cup: 1

2016

- SportPesa Shield 2019: 1

2019

== Management ==
Position	Staff
Head Coach	Benard Mwalala
Board of Trustees chairman	Eng. Steven Thoya
Media Liaison Officer	Steven Heywood
Club Chief Executive Officer	Tony Kibwana
Club Treasurer	Raymond Ogola
Club Administrator	Sarah Wamboi
Club Security Manager	Nkanai Noah

Last updated: 1 February 2016

== Performance in CAF competitions ==
- CAF Confederation Cup: 2 appearances

2016
