= 2024–25 Nairobi City Stars season =

Kenyan football club season

Nairobi City Stars
2024–25 KPL season
- Owner: Jonathan Jackson Foundation
- Chairman: Jonathan Jackson
- Head coach: Salim Babu
- Stadium: Hope Centre
- Kenyan Premier League: 18th
- Betway Cup: DNE
- Top goalscorer: League: Vincent Owino (5); All: Vincent Owino (5)
- Biggest win: 3-2 vs Mara Sugar (H), 9 May 2025, Kenyan Premier League
- Biggest defeat: 0-5 vs Kakamega Homeboyz (H), 13 Feb 2025, Kenyan Premier League

The 2024-25 season was Nairobi City Stars' fifth consecutive in the Kenyan Premier League following promotion in 2020, and the 17th overall since their maiden season in 2004.

It was a difficult campaign though for Nairobi City Stars as the club suffered relegation from the Kenyan Premier League after failing to pick a win in the 34th and final game of the season against Mathare United. An 18th positional finish confirmed the team's turbulent season marked by managerial changes, player departures, and inconsistent performances.

The club began the season under head coach Nicholas Muyoti before parting ways with him midway through the campaign. Former Kenya U-18 and U-20 coach Salim Babu later took charge in a bid to steer the side away from relegation only for a 0–0 draw on final day to dent his ambition.

22 of the 28 players from the 2023-24 season stayed on for this season with a few additions joining in such as the returning Sven Yida after two seasons.

A major turning point came in the of season when Samuel Kapen left the club and mid-season transfer window when influential attacking midfielder Mohammed Bajaber departed for Kenya Police and defensive midfielder Clifford Ouma to Bandari. In response City Stars reinforced the squad with six arrivals, including that of defensive midfielder Kevin Juma and attacking midfielder Joseph Mwangi.

Despite their struggles, City Stars recorded one of the standout achievements in the season by defeating champions Gor Mahia both home and away which was a fete never recorded in the previous 16 premier league seasons.

== Technical Bench ==
Position	Staff
Head coach	(Kenya) Salim Babu
First Assistant coach	(Kenya) Patrick Gitagia
Second Assistant coach	(Kenya) Peter Opiyo
Goalkeeper coach	(Kenya) Abel Omuhaya
Team manager	(Kenya) Ronney Kagunzi
Security Officer & Trainer	(Kenya) Arthur Museve
Team Physio	(Kenya) Brian Odongo
Kit Manager	(Kenya) Dominic Mutiso

Source: Nairobi City Stars

== Players ==
=== Squad information ===
Players and squad numbers last updated on 19 May 2026. Appearances include those in the 2024-25 Kenyan Premier League appearances.
Note: Flags indicate national team as has been defined under FIFA eligibility rules. Players only hold one non-FIFA nationality.

No.	Player	Nat.	Positions	Signed in	Contract ends	Signed From	Apps.	Goals
Goalkeepers
1	Edwin Mukolwe	(Kenya)	GK	2023	2025	(Kenya) Bidco United	19	0
13	Elvis Ochoro	(Kenya)	GK	2020	2025	(Kenya) Hakati Sportiff	16	0
23	Byron Owino	(Kenya)	GK	2024	2025	(Kenya) Kibera Black Stars	1	0
Defenders
2	Salim Odeka	(Kenya)	CB	2024	2025	(Kenya) Kisumu AllStars	14	1
4	Timothy Muganda	(Kenya)	CB	2022	2025	(Kenya) Mara Sugar	13	0
6	Brian Opinde	(Kenya)	CB	2024	2025	(Kenya) Langas Super Stars	2	0
8	Calvin Masawa (Overall captain)	(Kenya)	LB / RB	2011	2025	(Kenya) Nairobi City Stars	29	0
12	Edwin Buliba	(Kenya)	RB / CB	2019	2025	(Kenya) Nairobi City Stars	15	0
15	Wycliffe Omondi	(Kenya)	CB	2020	2023	(Kenya) Migori Youth	30	0
21	Rogers Wasega	(Kenya)	LB	2024	2027	(Kenya) Laiser Hill Academy	15	0
22	Stephen Bulugu	(Tanzania)	LB	2024	2026	(Kenya) Laiser Hill Academy	27	0
30	Rowland Makati	(Kenya)	RB / RW	2020	2025	(Kenya) Vapor Sports	21	1
Midfielders
3	Sven Yida	(Kenya)	DM	2024	2025	(South Africa) Marumo Gallants	20	0
14	Joseph Mwangi	(Kenya)	CM / AM	2025	2025	Tusker FC	13	1
16	Elvis Noor	(Kenya)	CM / DM	2019	2025	Kibera Black Stars	19	1
18	Kevin Juma	(Kenya)	DM	2025	2026	(Kenya) Gor Mahia	13	0
19	Vincent Owino	(Kenya)	AM	2023	2025	(Kenya) FC Talanta	30	5
25	Brian Mzee	(Kenya)	DM / CM	2023	2025	(Kenya) Kibera Black Stars	25	1
29	Benjamin Mosha	(Kenya)	FW	2025	2025	(Kenya) Sofapaka FC	14	1
31	Abuyeka Kubasu	(Kenya)	CM / AM	2023	2024	(Kenya) Vapor Sports	8	0
Forwards
5	Robinson Asenwa	(Kenya)	LW / RW	2023	2025	(Kenya) Vapor Sports	17	1
7	Maxwell Odada	(Kenya)	LW / RW	2025	2025	(Kenya) Muranga SEAL	10	0
9	Hansel Ochieng	(Kenya)	ST	2025	2025	(Kenya) Kakamega Homeboyz	13	2
10	Dennis Oalo	(Kenya)	ST / AM	2022	2025	(Kenya) FC Talanta	26	1
17	Brian Nyambane	(Kenya)	ST	2023	2025	(Kenya) Total Spurs	7	0
20	Kelvin Etemesi	(Kenya)	ST	2022	2025	(Kenya) Kangemi AllStars	27	4
27	Gilbert Abala	(Kenya)	ST	2023	2025	(Kenya) Busia Sugar FC	23	1
Players who left
7	Pius Omachi	(Kenya)	LW / RW	2022	2025	(Kenya) Vapor Sports	0	0
9	Yuto Kusaba	(Japan)	ST	2023	2025	(Kenya) FC Basara Hyogo	15	2
11	Mohammed Bajaber	(Kenya)	AM	2022	2025	(Kenya) Starfield Academy	16	4
18	Clifford Ouma	(Kenya)	DM	2022	2025	(Kenya) Gor Mahia	14	0
26	James Ssemambo	(Kenya)	AM	2024	2025	(Burundi) Bumamuru FC	5	0
28	Andre Kalama	(Democratic Republic of the Congo)	AM	2024	2025	(Kenya) Sofapaka FC	9	0

Source: Nairobi City Stars

== Off season transfers ==
=== In ===
Date	Pos.	Player	From	Ref.
9 Sep 2024	CB	(Kenya) Brian Opinde	(Kenya) Langas Super Stars	
9 Sep 2024	DM	(Kenya) Sven Yida	(South Africa) Marumo Gallants	
9 Sep 2024	AM	(Uganda) James Ssemambo	(Burundi) Bumamuru FC	
9 Sep 2024	FW	(Democratic Republic of the Congo) Andre Kalama	(Kenya) Sofapaka FC	

=== Out ===
Date	Pos.	Player	To	Ref.
1 July 2024	RW/ST	(Kenya) Samuel Kapen	(Kenya) Gor Mahia	
1 July 2024	LB	(Kenya) Dennis Wanjala	(Kenya) Tusker FC	
1 July 2024	DM	(Kenya) Shem Odinga	(Kenya) Shabana FC	
1 July 2024	AM	(Kenya) Newton Ochieng	(Kenya) Naivas FC	
1 July 2024	CB	(Kenya) Sosthenes Idah	Free agents	
1 July 2024	AM/LW	(Kenya) Andrew Kisilu	Free agents	

=== In ===
Date	Pos.	Player	From	Ref.
15 Feb 2024	AM	(Kenya) Joseph Mwangi	(Kenya) Tusker FC	
15 Feb 2024	DM	(Kenya) Kevin Juma	(Kenya) Gor Mahia FC	
15 Feb 2024	CB	(Kenya) Salim Odeka	(Kenya) Kisumu AllStars	
15 Feb 2024	FW	(Kenya) Benjamin Mosha	(Kenya) Sofapaka FC	
15 Feb 2024	ST	(Kenya) Hansel Ochieng	(Kenya) Kakamega Homeboyz	
15 Feb 2024	FW	(Kenya) Maxwell Odada	(Kenya) Muranga SEAL	

=== Out ===
Date	Pos.	Player	To	Ref.
1 Jan 2025	LW/RW	(Kenya) Pius Omachi	Free agents	
1 Jan 2025	AM	(Uganda) James Ssemambo	Free agents	
1 Jan 2025	FW	(Democratic Republic of the Congo) Andre Kalama	(Northern Ireland) Wellington Rec. FC	
24 Jan 2025	FW	(Kenya) Mohammed Bajaber	Kenya Police FC	
13 Feb 2025	DM	(Kenya) Clifford Ouma	(Kenya) Bandari	

== Competitions ==
=== Overall record ===
Competition	First match	Last match	Starting round	Final position	Record							
Competition	First match	Last match	Starting round	Final position	Pld	W	D	L	GF	GA	GD	Win %
2024-25 KPL	14 Sep 2024	22 Jun 2025	Matchday 1	18th	34	8	11	15	26	41	−15	23.53
Total					34	8	11	15	26	41	−15	23.53

Source: Soccerway

=== Premier League ===
==== Results summary ====
Overall								Home						Away					
Pld	W	D	L	GF	GA	GD	Pts	W	D	L	GF	GA	GD	W	D	L	GF	GA	GD
34	8	11	15	26	41	−15	35	4	8	5	12	18	−6	4	3	10	14	23	−9

Source: Soccerway

==== Results by round ====
Round	2	3	4	5	6	7	8	9	10	11	1	12	13	14	15	16	17	18	19	20	21	22	23	24	25	26	27	28	29	30	31	32	33	34
Ground	H	A	A	H	A	H	A	H	A	H	A	H	A	H	A	A	H	A	H	A	H	A	H	A	H	H	A	H	A	H	A	H	A	H
Result	D	L	L	D	L	W	W	L	W	L	L	W	D	D	L	L	D	L	L	D	L	D	W	L	D	D	L	L	L	W	W	D	W	D
Position	11	15	16	14	16	15	15	11	11	13	13	11	12	14	15	16	16	16	17	17	18	18	18	18	18	18	18	18	18	18	17	18	16	18
Points	1	1	1	2	2	5	8	8	11	11	11	14	15	16	16	16	17	17	17	18	18	19	22	22	23	24	24	24	24	27	30	31	34	35

Source: Soccerway
A = Away; H = Home; W = Win; D = Draw; L = Loss; P = Postponed

==== Score overview ====
Win Draw Loss

Opposition	Home score	Away score	Aggregate score	Double
AFC Leopards	0-1	1-2	1-3	No
Bandari	0-1	0-1	0-2	No
Bidco Utd	1-1	1-1	2-2	No
Gor Mahia	2-1	2-1	4-2	Yes
Kakamega Homeboyz	0-5	0-2	0-7	No
Kariobangi Sharks	0-0	2-2	2-2	No
KCB	1-1	2-1	3-2	No
Kenya Police	1-1	1-3	2-4	No
Mara Sugar	0-1	3-2	3-3	No
Mathare United	0-0	1-0	1-0	No
Muranga SEAL	1-0	0-1	1-1	No
Posta Rangers	1-1	1-2	2-3	No
Shabana	0-2	1-0	1-2	No
Sofapaka	1-1	0-2	1-3	No
Talanta	1-1	1-1	2-2	No
Tusker	0-1	0-1	0-2	No
Ulinzi Stars	1-0	1-2	2-2	No

Source: Soccerway

==== Matches ====
Win Draw Loss Fixtures

The initial league fixtures were announced on 2 August 2024. City Stars however sat out the opener as their matchday one opponent Kenya Police were engaged with continental games.

14 September 2024 2	Nairobi City Stars	1-1	Bidco United	Nairobi
15:00 UTC+3	Yuto 2'; Ssemambo (yellow card) 83'	Report	Ikutwa (yellow card) 9' (goal) (84)); Michubu (yellow card) 51'	Stadium: Dandora; Referee: Phanuel Ogwang

21 September 2024 3	Mara Sugar	1-0	Nairobi City Stars	Awendo
15:00 UTC+3	Cheruiyot 60' (yellow card) 66'	Report	Sven (yellow card) 43'; Makati (yellow card) 56'; Muganda (yellow card) 89'	Stadium: Awendo; Referee: Alfred Olwande

29 September 2024 4	AFC Leopards	2-1	Nairobi City Stars	Nairobi
15:00 UTC+3	Otieno 15'; Awiko 43' (o.g.); Odhiambo 71'; Kayci (yellow card) 74'; Opiyo (yellow card) 90'	Report	Noor 29'; Awiko (yellow card) 36'; Masawa (yellow card) 56'	Stadium: Dandora; Referee: Dr. Waweru

19 October 2024 5	Nairobi City Stars	1-1	Sofapaka FC	Nairobi
15:00 UTC+3	Yuto 32' 55'	Report	Kuloba (yellow card) 15'; Ongaya 30'	Stadium: Dandora; Referee: Lucy Awino

23 October 2023 6	Kakamega Homeboyz	2-0	Nairobi City Stars	Mumias
15:00 UTC+3	Majak 6'; Shuma 45+2'	Report	Ouma (yellow card) 44'; Muganda (yellow card) 52'; Noor (yellow card) 74'; Awiko (yellow card) 82'	Stadium: Mumias Complex; Attendance: 400; Referee: Paul Mbuya

28 October 2024 7	Nairobi City Stars	2-1	Gor Mahia	Machakos
15:00 UTC+3	Muganda (yellow card) 17'; Asenwa 60'; Buliba (yellow card) 62' (yellow-red card) 89'; Oalo 68'; Bajaber (yellow card) 90+5'	Report	Levin 23'; Musa (yellow card) 63'	Stadium: Kenyatta; Referee: Brooke Philip

3 November 2024 8	Shabana FC	0-1	Nairobi City Stars	Kisii
15:00 UTC+3		Report	Bajaber 5'; Muganda (yellow card) 22'; Yida (yellow card) 66'; Bulugu (yellow card) 77'; Etemesi (yellow card) 87'	Stadium: Gusii; Referee: Benjamin Khayenje

23 November 2023 9	Nairobi City Stars	0-1	Tusker	Machakos
15:00 UTC+3	Bajaber (yellow card) 78'	Report	Ogam 62'; Fabian (yellow card) 89'	Stadium: Kenyatta; Referee: Diego Oyoo

1 November 2023 10	Mathare United	0-1	Nairobi City Stars	Nairobi
15:00 UTC+3	Asango (yellow card) 48'; Okola (yellow card) 90+3'	Report	Etemesi 47'; Awiko (yellow card) 55'; Masawa (yellow card) 64'; Noor (yellow card) 77'	Stadium: Kasarani Annex; Referee: Lucy Awino

30 November 2024 11	Nairobi City Stars	0-1	Bandari	Machakos
15:00 UTC+3		Report	Apudo 3' (yellow card) 34'; Odhiambo (Coach) (yellow card) 62' (yellow card) 34'	Stadium: Kenyatta; Referee: John Sulwe

4 December 2024 1	Kenya Police	3-1	Nairobi City Stars	Nairobi
15:00 UTC+3	Kinanga 14'; Omondi 40'; Omar (yellow card) 60'; Okoth (yellow card) 72'; Zakayo 90+2'	Report	Bajaber 38'	Stadium: Dandora; Referee: Josphine Wanjiku

7 December 2024 12	Nairobi City Stars	1-0	Muranga SEAL	Machakos
15:00 UTC+3	Bajaber (yellow card) 4'; Makati 55'	Report		Stadium: Kenyatta; Referee: Dr. Waweru

11 December 2024 13	Kariobangi Sharks	2-2	Nairobi City Stars	Nairobi
15:00 UTC+3	Panchol 43' (pen.); Odhiambo 49'; Otieno (yellow card) 54'	Report	Bajaber 14'; Mzee 61'; Kagunzi (TM) (yellow card) 65'; Makati (yellow card) 81'	Stadium: Kasarani Annex; Referee: Stephen Rimba

14 December 2024 14	Nairobi City Stars	1-1	FC Talanta	Nairobi
15:00 UTC+3	Bajaber 11'; Sven (yellow card) 60'; Ochoro (yellow card) 70'	Report	Osoro 90+5'	Stadium: Utalii Grounds; Referee: Eric Njogu

22 December 2024 15	Ulinzi Stars	2-1	Nairobi City Stars	Nairobi
15:00 UTC+3	Samunya 45+2'; Kafero 58'; Owino (yellow card) 79'	Report	Etemesi 31'; Mzee (yellow card) 66'; Bulugu (yellow card) 77'	Stadium: Dandora; Referee: Edwin Bobiya

11 January 2025 16	Posta Rangers	2-1	Nairobi City Stars	Machakos
15:00 UTC+3	Shivachi 23' (yellow card) 47'; Sunga (yellow card) 66'; Maloba 90+3'	Report	Owino 5' (pen.); Bulugu (yellow card) 41'	Stadium: Kenyatta; Referee: Hillary Onyango

19 January 2025 17	Nairobi City Stars	1-1	KCB	Machakos
13:00 UTC+3	Etemesi 5'; Bulugu (yellow card) 14'	Report	Nyakwaka 23' (yellow card) 62'; Ominde (yellow card) 77'; Owino (yellow card) 84'	Stadium: Kenyatta; Referee: James Murichu

26 January 2025 18	Bandari	1-0	Nairobi City Stars	Mombasa
15:00 UTC+3	Nyamawi 15' (yellow card) 45+1'; Origa (yellow card) 44'; Onyango (yellow card) 57'; Omusinde (yellow card) 85'	Report		Stadium: Mbaraki; Referee: Dr. Waweru

2 February 2025 19	Nairobi City Stars	0-1	AFC Leopards	Machakos
13:00 UTC+3	Owino (yellow card) 19'; Bulugu (yellow card) 67'	Report	Bandi (yellow card) 43'; Odhiambo 73' (pen.); Opiyo (yellow card) 90'	Stadium: Kenyatta; Referee: Simeon Nyanchong'i

8 February 2025 20	Bidco United	1-1	Nairobi City Stars	Machakos
13:00 UTC+3	Abala 14'	Report	Kunyili 46'	Stadium: Kenyatta; Referee: Lucy Awino

14 February 2025 21	Nairobi City Stars	0-5	Kakamega Homeboyz	Nairobi
13:00 UTC+3	Omondi (yellow card) 38'; Owino (yellow card) 55'	Report	Otunga 9'; Otieno 13'; Shumah 15', 49'; Onyango (yellow card) 55'; Omollo 88'	Stadium: Dandora; Referee: Phanuel Ogwang

21 February 2025 22	FC Talanta	1-1	Nairobi City Stars	Nairobi
15:00 UTC+3	Odhiambo (yellow card) 57'; Osoro 58'; Machaka (yellow card) 72'	Report	Owino 22'; Odeka (yellow card) 58'; Juma (yellow card) 83'	Stadium: Dandora; Referee: Isaac Hamisi

1 March 2025 23	Nairobi City Stars	1-0	Ulinzi Stars	Machakos
15:00 UTC+3	Etemesi 4' (yellow card) 56'; Abala (yellow card) 14'; Bulugu (yellow card) 28'	Report	Waswa (yellow card) 43'; Birgen (yellow card) 56'; Makokha (yellow card) 65'	Stadium: Kenyatta; Referee: Isaac Hamisi

14 March 2025 24	Sofapaka FC	2-0	Nairobi City Stars	Nairobi
15:00 UTC+3	Onyanya 14'; Simiyu 90+5'	Report	Ochoro (yellow card) 44' (yellow-red card) 72'	Stadium: Dandora

29 March 2025 25	Nairobi City Stars	0-0	Kariobangi Sharks	Machakos
15:00 UTC+3		Report		Stadium: Kenyatta

6 April 2025 26	Nairobi City Stars	0-0	Kenya Police	Machakos
15:00 UTC+3		Report		Stadium: Kenyatta

20 April 2025 27	Tusker	1-0	Nairobi City Stars	Machakos
15:00 UTC+3	Wanjala 4'	Report	Awiko (yellow card) 43' (yellow-red card) 55'	Stadium: Kenyatta

26 April 2025 28	Nairobi City Stars	0-2	Shabana FC	Machakos
15:00 UTC+3		Report	Imbali 52'; Msagha 71'	Stadium: Kenyatta

4 May 2025 29	Muranga SEAL	1-0	Nairobi City Stars	Muranga
15:00 UTC+3	Haki 39'	Report		Stadium: SportPesa Arena

9 May 2025 30	Nairobi City Stars	3-2	Mara Sugar	Nairobi
15:00 UTC+3	Odeka 13'; Owino 39'; Ochieng 51'	Report	Cheruiyot 52', 63'	Stadium: Dandora

15 May 2025 31	Gor Mahia	1-2	Nairobi City Stars	Nairobi
15:00 UTC+3	Omala 10'	Report	Hansel 4'; Owino 17' (pen.)	Stadium: Dandora

18 May 2025 32	Nairobi City Stars	1-1	Posta Rangers	Machakos
15:00 UTC+3	Owino 65'	Report	Mboya 34'	Stadium: Kenyatta

15 June 2025 33	KCB	1-2	Nairobi City Stars	Muranga
15:00 UTC+3	Ondabu 55'	Report	Mosha 40'; Mwangi 66'	Stadium: SportPesa Arean

22 June 2024 34	Nairobi City Stars	0-0	Mathare United	Thika
15:00 UTC+3		Report		Stadium: Thika Stadium

== Statistics ==
=== Appearances ===
No.	Pos.	Player	Premier League	Elite Cup	Total
1	GK	(Kenya) Edwin Mukolwe	19	0	19
2	CB	(Kenya) Salim Odeka	14	0	14
3	DM	(Kenya) Sven Yida	20	0	20
4	DF	(Kenya) Timothy Muganda	13	0	13
5	FW	(Kenya) Robinson Asenwa	17	0	17
6	CB	(Kenya) Brian Opinde	2	0	2
7	FW	(Kenya) Maxwell Odada	10	0	10
8	DF	(Kenya) Calvin Masawa	29	0	29
9	ST	(Kenya) Hansel Ochieng	13	0	13
10	ST	(Kenya) Dennis Oalo	26	0	26
12	DF	(Kenya) Edwin Buliba	15	0	15
13	GK	(Kenya) Elvis Ochoro	16	0	16
14	AM	(Kenya) Joseph Mwangi	13	0	13
15	CB	(Kenya) Wycliffe Omondi	30	0	30
16	MF	(Kenya) Elvis Noor	19	0	19
17	ST	(Kenya) Brian Nyambane	7	0	7
18	DM	(Kenya) Kevin Juma	13	0	13
19	AM	(Kenya) Vincent Owino	30	0	30
20	FW	(Kenya) Kelvin Etemesi	27	0	27
21	LB	(Kenya) Rogers Wasega	15	0	15
22	LB	(Tanzania) Stephen Bulugu	27	0	27
23	GK	(Kenya) Byron Owino	1	0	1
25	MF	(Kenya) Brian Mzee	23	0	23
27	FW	(Kenya) Gilbert Abala	23	0	23
29	FW	(Kenya) Benjamin Mosha	14	0	14
30	RB	(Kenya) Rowland Makati	21	0	21
31	MF	(Kenya) Abuyeka Kubasu	8	0	8
Players who left the club
7	FW	(Kenya) Pius Omachi	0	0	0
9	ST	(Japan) Yuto Kusaba	15	0	15
11	FW	(Kenya) Mohammed Bajaber	16	0	16
18	DM	(Kenya) Clifford Ouma	14	0	14
26	AM	(Uganda) James Ssemambo	5	0	5
28	FW	(Kenya) Andre Kalama	9	0	9

=== Goalscorers ===
No.	Pos.	Player	Premier League	Elite Cup	Total
19	AM	(Kenya) Vincent Owino	5	0	5
20	FW	(Kenya) Kelvin Etemesi	4	0	4
9	ST	(Kenya) Hansel Ochieng	2	0	2
2	CB	(Kenya) Salim Odeka	1	0	1
5	FW	(Kenya) Robinson Asenwa	1	0	1
10	ST	(Kenya) Dennis Oalo	1	0	1
14	AM	(Kenya) Joseph Mwangi	1	0	1
16	MF	(Kenya) Elvis Noor	1	0	1
25	MF	(Kenya) Brian Mzee	1	0	1
27	FW	(Kenya) Gilbert Abala	1	0	1
29	FW	(Kenya) Benjamin Mosha	1	0	1
30	RB	(Kenya) Rowland Makati	1	0	1
Players who left the club
11	FW	(Kenya) Mohammed Bajaber	4	0	4
9	ST	(Japan) Yuto Kusaba	2	0	2
Totals			26	0	26

Source: Soccerway

=== Top Assists ===
No.	Pos.	Player	Premier League	Elite Cup	Total
20	FW	(Kenya) Kelvin Etemesi	4	0	4
19	AM	(Kenya) Vincent Owino	2	0	2
25	MF	(Kenya) Brian Mzee	2	0	2
27	FW	(Kenya) Gilbert Abala	2	0	2
2	CB	(Kenya) Salim Odeka	1	0	1
4	CB	(Kenya) Timothy Muganda	1	0	1
5	FW	(Kenya) Robinson Asenwa	1	0	1
9	ST	(Kenya) Hansel Ochieng	1	0	1
14	AM	(Kenya) Joseph Mwangi	1	0	1
16	MF	(Kenya) Elvis Noor	1	0	1
18	DM	(Kenya) Kevin Juma	1	0	1
21	LB	(Kenya) Rogers Wasega	1	0	1
29	FW	(Kenya) Benjamin Mosha	1	0	1
Players who left the club
9	ST	(Japan) Yuto Kusaba	3	0	3
11	FW	(Kenya) Mohammed Bajaber	3	0	3
26	AM	(Uganda) James Ssemambo	1	0	1
Totals			26	0	26

Source: Soccerway

=== Clean sheets ===
Rank	No.	Pos.	Player	Premier League	Elite Cup	Total
1	1	GK	(Kenya) Edwin Mukolwe	4	0	4
2	13	GK	(Kenya) Elvis Ochoro	3	0	3
3	23	GK	(Kenya) Byron Owino	0	0	0
Totals				7	0	7
