= 2023–24 Nairobi City Stars season =

Kenyan football club season

Nairobi City Stars
2023–24 KPL season
- Owner: Jonathan Jackson Foundation
- Chairman: Jonathan Jackson
- Head coach: Nicholas Muyoti
- Stadium: Hope Centre
- Kenyan Premier League: 6th
- Betway Cup: DNE
- Top goalscorer: League: Vincent Owino (8); All: Vincent Owino (8)
- Biggest win: 3-0 vs FC Talanta (H), 6 Jan 2024 & 20 Apr 2024, vs Muranga SEAL, 13 Apr 2024, Kenyan Premier League
- Biggest defeat: 4-1 vs Gor Mahia (A), 17 Sep 2023, vs KCB (A), 29 Oct 2023, Kenyan Premier League

The 2023-24 KPL season was Nairobi City Stars' fourth consecutive in the Kenyan Premier League following promotion in 2020, and the 16th overall since 2004.

The 2023-24 season was Nicholas Muyoti third straight season that marked the exit of a number of players such as Peter Opiyo, Kenedy Onyango, Salim Abdalla, Anthony Kimani, Jacob Osano, Ezekiel Odera and Herit Mungai who were part of the teams' return to the top flight during the 2020-21 season, all left the club. A total of nine untested players - including Japanese forward Yuto Kusaba - joined the club to take up positions left by ten exiting players.

A dozen more from last season including Mohammed Bajaber, Samuel Kapen, Kelvin Etemesi, Clifford Ouma, the long serving Calvin Masawa and Dennis Oalo, amongst others, all re upped their contracts for the new campaign.

== Technical Bench ==
Position	Staff
Head coach	(Kenya) Nicholas Muyoti
First Assistant head coach	(Kenya) Peter Opiyo
Second Assistant head coach	(Kenya) Obed Nyamweya
Goalkeeper coach	(Kenya) Abel Omuhaya
Team manager	(Kenya) Ronney Kagunzi
Security Officer & Trainer	(Kenya) Arthur Museve
Team Physio	(Kenya) Brian Odongo
Kit Manager	(Kenya) Victor Rolex Onyango

Source: Nairobi City Stars

== Players ==
=== Squad information ===
Players and squad numbers last updated on 19 May 2026. Appearances include those in the 2021-22 Kenyan Premier League appearances and the Elite Cup played in preseason.
Note: Flags indicate national team as has been defined under FIFA eligibility rules. Players only hold one non-FIFA nationality.

No.	Player	Nat.	Positions	Signed in	Contract ends	Signed from	Apps.	Goals
Goalkeepers
1	Edwin Mukolwe	(Kenya)	GK	2023	2024	(Kenya) Bidco United	26	0
13	Elvis Ochoro	(Kenya)	GK	2020	2025	(Kenya) Hakati Sportiff	6	0
23	Byron Owino	(Kenya)	GK	2024	2024	(Kenya) Kibera Black Stars	2	0
Defenders
4	Timothy Muganda	(Kenya)	CB	2022	2024	(Kenya) Mara Sugar	25	0
8	Calvin Masawa (Overall captain)	(Kenya)	LB / RB	2011	2024	(Kenya) Nairobi City Stars	21	0
12	Edwin Buliba	(Kenya)	RB / CB	2019	2024	(Kenya) Nairobi City Stars	18	0
15	Wycliffe Omondi	(Kenya)	CB	2020	2023	(Kenya) Migori Youth	31	1
24	Rogers Wasega	(Kenya)	LB	2024	2027	(Kenya) Laiser Hill Academy	0	0
26	Dennis Wanjala	(Kenya)	LB	2021	2024	(Kenya) Nzoia Sugar	28	1
30	Rowland Makati	(Kenya)	RB / RW	2020	2024	(Kenya) Vapor Sports	21	1
32	Sosthenes Idah	(Kenya)	CB	2023	2024	(Kenya) Polisi Tanzania	15	0
Midfielders
5	Newton Ochieng	(Kenya)	AM	2022	2024	(Kenya) Vaport Sports	19	0
6	Shem Odinga	(Kenya)	DM	2024	2024	(Kenya) Kibera Angels	6	0
11	Andrew Kisilu	(Kenya)	AM	2022	2024	(Kenya) Dandora Love	21	1
16	Elvis Noor	(Kenya)	CM / DM	2019	2024	Kibera Black Stars	20	1
18	Clifford Ouma	(Kenya)	DM	2020	2022	(Kenya) Migori Youth	19	0
19	Vincent Owino	(Kenya)	AM	2023	2024	(Kenya) FC Talanta	33	8
25	Brian Mzee	(Kenya)	DM / CM	2023	2024	(Kenya) Kibera Black Stars	25	0
31	Abuyeka Kubasu	(Kenya)	CM / AM	2023	2024	(Kenya) Vapor Sports	12	0
Forwards
3	Robinson Asenwa	(Kenya)	LW / RW	2023	2024	(Kenya) Vapor Sports	29	4
7	Pius Omachi	(Kenya)	LW / RW	2022	2024	(Kenya) Vapor Sports	1	0
9	Mohammed Bajaber	(Kenya)	CM / AM	2021	2023	(Kenya) Starfield Academy	25	6
10	Dennis Oalo	(Kenya)	ST / AM	2022	2023	(Kenya) FC Talanta	30	6
17	Brian Nyambane	(Kenya)	ST	2023	2023	(Kenya) Total Spurs	13	0
20	Kelvin Etemesi	(Kenya)	AM	2022	2024	(Kenya) Kangemi AllStars	24	3
22	Samuel Kapen	(Kenya)	ST	2022	2023	(Kenya) Kibera Black Stars	32	6
21	Yuto Kusaba	(Kenya)	ST	2023	2024	(Kenya) FC Basara Hyogo	13	3
27	Gilbert Abala	(Kenya)	ST	2020	2023	(Kenya) Busia Sugar FC	12	1
Players who left
6	Ronney Kola	(Kenya)	DM	2020	2025	(Kenya) KSG Ogopa FC	1	0
23	Julius Ombacho	(Kenya)	GK	2023	2024	(Kenya) Luanda Villa	0	0

Source: Nairobi City Stars

== Off season transfers ==
=== In ===
==== Offseason ====
Date	Pos.	Player	From	Ref.
25 August 2023	CM/DM	(Kenya) Brian Mzee	(Kenya) Kibera Black Stars	
25 August 2023	DM	(Kenya) Robinson Asenwa	(Kenya) Vapor Sports	
25 August 2023	LW/RW	(Kenya) Gilbert Abala	(Kenya) Busia Sugar FC	
25 August 2023	CB	(Kenya) Sosthenes Idah	(Kenya) Polisi Tanzania	
25 August 2023	CB	(Kenya) Wycliffe Omondi	(Kenya) Migori Youth	
25 August 2023	GK	(Kenya) Julius Ombacho	(Kenya) Luanda Villa	
25 August 2023	GK	(Kenya) Edwin Mukolwe	(Kenya) Bidco United	
25 August 2023	ST	(Kenya) Brian Nyambane	(Kenya) Total Spurs	
25 August 2023	ST	(Kenya) Yuto Kusaba	(Japan) FC Basara Hyogo	

=== Out ===
Date	Pos.	Player	To	Ref.
1 July 2023	CM/AM	(Kenya) Anthony Kimani	Retired	
1 July 2023	CM/DM	(Kenya) Peter Opiyo	Retired	
1 July 2023	CB	(Kenya) Salim Abdalla	Free agents	
1 July 2023	ST	(Kenya) Ezekiel Odera	Free agents	
1 July 2023	CB	(Kenya) Kenedy Onyango	(Kenya) Gor Mahia FC	
1 July 2023	LB/LW	(Kenya) Herit Mungai	(Kenya) KCB	
1 July 2023	LW/LB	(Kenya) James Mazembe	(Kenya) KCB FC	
1 July 2023	ST	(Kenya) Levis Okello	(Kenya) Kakamega Homeboyz	
1 July 2023	GK	(Kenya) Jacob Osano	(Kenya) Sofapaka FC	
1 July 2023	GK	(Kenya) Stephen Njunge	(Kenya) Mathare United FC	

=== In ===
Date	Pos.	Player	From	Ref.
2 Feb 2024	LB	(Kenya) Rogers Wasega	(Kenya) Laiser Hill Academy	
9 Feb 2024	DM	(Kenya) Shem Odinga	(Kenya) Kibera Angels	
9 Feb 2024	GK	(Kenya) Byron Owino	(Kenya) Kibera Black Stars	

=== Out ===
Date	Pos.	Player	To	Ref.
24 Jan 2024	DM	(Kenya) Ronney Kola	(Kenya) Naivas FC	
9 Feb 2024	GK	(Kenya) Julius Ombacho	(Kenya) Kibera Black Stars	

== Competitions ==
=== Overall record ===
Competition	First match	Last match	Starting round	Final position	Record							
Competition	First match	Last match	Starting round	Final position	Pld	W	D	L	GF	GA	GD	Win %
2023-24 KPL	27 Aug 2023	23 Jun 2024	Matchday 1	6th	34	13	11	10	42	39	+3	38.24
Total					34	13	11	10	42	39	+3	38.24

Source: rsssf

=== Premier League ===
==== Results summary ====
Overall								Home						Away					
Pld	W	D	L	GF	GA	GD	Pts	W	D	L	GF	GA	GD	W	D	L	GF	GA	GD
34	13	11	10	42	39	+3	50	7	7	3	23	16	+7	6	4	7	19	23	−4

Source: Soccerway

==== Results by round ====
Round	1	2	3	4	5	6	7	8	9	10	11	12	13	14	15	16	17	18	19	20	21	22	23	24	25	26	27	28	29	30	31	32	33	34
Ground	H	A	A	H	A	H	A	H	A	H	A	H	A	H	A	A	H	H	A	H	A	H	A	H	A	H	A	H	A	H	A	H	H	A
Result	D	D	L	W	W	L	D	L	L	W	L	W	W	W	W	W	W	W	L	D	W	L	D	D	L	W	W	D	L	D	D	D	D	L
Position	13	11	11	10	7	9	11	12	13	11	13	9	9	7	6	5	2	2	2	4	2	6	4	5	6	4	5	5	6	5	5	5	5	6
Points	1	2	2	5	8	8	9	9	9	12	12	15	18	21	24	27	30	33	33	34	37	37	38	39	39	42	45	46	46	47	48	49	50	50

Source: Soccerway
A = Away; H = Home; W = Win; D = Draw; L = Loss; P = Postponed

==== Score overview ====
Win Draw Loss

Opposition	Home score	Away score	Aggregate score	Double
AFC Leopards	3-2	0-2	3-3	No
Bandari	1-0	1-0	2-0	Yes
Bidco Utd	1-1	1-1	2-2	No
Gor Mahia	1-4	0-1	1-5	No
Kakamega Homeboyz	1-1	1-0	2-0	No
Kariobangi Sharks	3-1	0-0	3-1	No
KCB	1-4	2-3	3-7	No
Kenya Police	0-1	1-2	1-3	No
Muhoroni Youth	0-0	0-2	0-2	No
Muranga SEAL	3-0	1-2	4-2	No
Nzoia Sugar	2-1	0-0	2-1	No
Posta Rangers	1-0	1-0	2-0	Yes
Shabana	0-0	2-2	2-2	No
Sofapaka	1-1	2-1	3-2	No
Talanta	3-0	3-0	6-0	Yes
Tusker	2-2	1-3	3-5	No
Ulinzi Stars	1-1	2-1	3-1	No

==== Matches ====
Win Draw Loss Fixtures

The tentative league fixtures were announced on 9 November 2022.

27 August 2023 1	Nairobi City Stars	0-0	Muhoroni Youth	Nairobi
15:00 UTC+3	Awiko (yellow card) 34)'; Oalo (yellow card) 52'; Etemesi (penalty missed) 90+1	Report		Stadium: Kasarani Annex

3 September 2023 2	Bidco United	1-1	Nairobi City Stars	Nairobi
15:00 UTC+3	Ndungu 67'; Macharia 89'	Report	Omondi (yellow card) 8'; Mzee (yellow card) 51'; Kisilu 56'	Stadium: Kasarani Annex

17 September 2023 3	Gor Mahia	4-1	Nairobi City Stars	Nairobi
15:00 UTC+3	Omala 10', 30'; Onyango 45' (yellow card) 90+1'; Odhiambo 71'; Omondi (yellow card) 88'	Report	Oalo 66'	Stadium: Kasarani

24 September 2023 4	Nairobi City Stars	2-1	Nzoia Sugar	Nairobi
15:00 UTC+3	Etemesi 48'; Makati 62'; Mzee (yellow card) 71'; Mukolwe (yellow card) 86'; Noor (yellow card) 89'	Report	Osoro 8'	Stadium: Ruaraka; Referee: Duncan Ogosi

30 September 2023 5	Sofapaka	1-2	Nairobi City Stars	Nairobi
15:00 UTC+3	Maliachi 54'; Maloba (yellow card) 63'	Report	Etemesi 32'; Kapen (yellow card) 41'; Owino 56' (yellow card) 60'; Mukolwe (yellow card) 62'; Decha (yellow card) 70'	Stadium: Kasarani Annex

7 October 2023 6	Nairobi City Stars	0-1	Kenya Police	Nairobi
15:00 UTC+3	Idah (yellow card) 90+'	Report	Omoto (yellow card) 12'; Kinanga (yellow card) 39'; Okello 45+' (pen.); Ouma (yellow card) 70'	Stadium: Police Sacco

22 October 2023 7	Shabana FC	2-2	Nairobi City Stars	Homabay
15:00 UTC+3	Mukangula 17'; Nyabuto 42'; Ochieng (yellow card) 48'	Report	Kapen 5'; Idah (yellow card) 20'; Owino 84' (pen.)	Stadium: Raila Odinga

29 October 2023 8	Nairobi City Stars	1-4	KCB	Nairobi
15:00 UTC+3	Etemesi 30'; Idah (yellow card) 86'	Report	Kipkirui 11' (yellow card) 87'; Wesonga 17'; Kahiro (yellow card) 55' (goal) 57'; Namasaka 72' (yellow card) 72' (yellow-red card) 76'	Stadium: Kasarani Annex

1 November 2023 9	Muranga SEAL	2-1	Nairobi City Stars	Muranga
15:00 UTC+3	Kapchanga 12' (yellow card) 13'; Kweyu 63'; Marvin (yellow card) 52'; Moyo (yellow card) 86'; Mwita (yellow card) 90'	Report	Asenwa 81'; Mukolwe (yellow card) 57'; Etemesi (yellow card) 57' (red card) 73'	Stadium: SportPesa Arena

4 November 2023 10	Nairobi City Stars	3-2	AFC Leopards	Nairobi
15:00 UTC+3	Owino 22'; Kapen 55'; Asenwa 61'	Report	Kayci (yellow card) 35'; Otieno 59'; Yakhama 83' (pen.)	Stadium: Kasarani

11 November 2023 11	Tusker FC	3-1	Nairobi City Stars	Machakos
15:00 UTC+3	Oduor 2'; Odoyo 16'; Mwangi 42'	Report	Oalo 62'	Stadium: Kenyatta

25 November 2023 12	Nairobi City Stars	3-1	Kariobangi Sharks	Nairobi
15:00 UTC+3	Bajaber 4'; Owino 45+' (pen.), 48' (pen.); Ouma (yellow card) 45+'; Mukolwe (yellow card) 56'; Kapen (yellow card) 64'; Noor (yellow card) 86'	Report	Onyango (yellow card) 58'	Stadium: Kasarani Annex

2 December 2023 13	Posta Rangers	0-1	Nairobi City Stars	Machakos
15:00 UTC+3	Mwema (yellow card) 53'; Musa (yellow card) 59'	Report	Kapen 18' (yellow card) 68'; Noor (yellow card) 67'	Stadium: Kenyatta

9 December 2023 14	Nairobi City Stars	1-0	Bandari	Nairobi
15:00 UTC+3	Asenwa 3'; Owino (yellow card) 22'; Bajaber (yellow card) 50'; Masawa (yellow card) 73'	Report		Stadium: Kasarani Annex

17 February 2023 15	Ulinzi Stars	1-2	Nairobi City Stars	Nairobi
15:00 UTC+3	Muchiri 37'	Report	Muganda (yellow card) 32'; Owino 62'; Bajaber (yellow card) 64'; Oalo 72'	Stadium: Ulinzi Complex

22 December 2023 16	Kakamega Homeboyz	0-1	Nairobi City Stars	Kakamega
15:00 UTC+3	Esiye (yellow card) 90+'	Report	Buliba (yellow card) 25'; Noor (yellow card) 49'; Awiko 61' (yellow card) 88'; Idah (yellow card) 90+'; Muyoti (Coach) (red card) 90+'; Museve (Trainer) (red card) 90+'; Kagunzi (TM) (red card) 90+'	Stadium: Bukhungu

6 January 2024 17	Nairobi City Stars	3-0	FC Talanta	Nairobi
13:00 UTC+3	Bajaber 37' (yellow card) 75'; Asenwa 55'; Kapen 77'; Muganda (yellow card) 87'	Report		Stadium: Ruaraka

14 January 2024 18	Nairobi City Stars	1-0	Posta Rangers	Nairobi
13:00 UTC+3	Bajaber 3'; Buliba (yellow card) 25'	Report		Stadium: Ruaraka

21 January 2024 19	AFC Leopards	2-0	Nairobi City Stars	Kakamega
13:00 UTC+3	Otieno 47'; Kimani 72'	Report	Buliba (yellow card) 47'; Masawa (red card) 90+4'	Stadium: Bukhungu

4 February 2024 20	Nairobi City Stars	0-0	Shabana FC	Machakos
13:00 UTC+3	Mzee (yellow card) 54'; Newton (red card) 65'; Omachi (yellow card) 90'	Report	Ayeko (red card) 65'	Stadium: Kenyatta Stadium

10 February 2024 21	Bandari	0-1	Nairobi City Stars	Mombasa
13:00 UTC+3	Muganda (yellow card) 18'; Owino 34'; Mukolwe (yellow card) 82'; Noor (yellow card) 90+4'	Report	Meja (yellow card) 90+2'	Stadium: Mbaaraki

17 February 2024 22	Nairobi City Stars	0-1	Gor Mahia	Machakos
15:00 UTC+3	Muganda (yellow card) 15'; Kagunzi (TM) (yellow card) 52'; Ouma (yellow card) 57'; Awiko (yellow card) 71'	Report	Omala 4'; Odhiambo (yellow card) 37'; Otieno (yellow card) 55'	Stadium: Kenyatta

2 March 2024 23	Kariobangi Sharks	0-0	Nairobi City Stars	Nairobi
15:00 UTC+3	Idah (yellow card) 43'; Muganda (yellow card) 78'; Ouma (yellow card) 86'	Report	Makwata (penalty missed) 79	Stadium: Police Sacco

9 March 2024 24	Nairobi City Stars	1-1	Bidco United	Machakos
15:00 UTC+3	Oalo 40'; Masawa (yellow card) 54'; Awiko (yellow card) 86'; Owino (yellow card) 90+'	Report	Onyango 90+4'	Stadium: Kenyatta

6 April 2024 25	Muhoroni Youth	2-0	Nairobi City Stars	Muhoroni
15:00 UTC+3	Green 27' (pen.); Bulugu 89'	Report	Muganda (yellow card) 67'	Stadium: Muhoroni

13 April 2024 26	Nairobi City Stars	3-0	Muranga SEAL	Nairobi
15:00 UTC+3	Bajaber 54' (pen.); Oalo 56'; Noor (yellow card) 60'; Mzee (yellow card) 71'; Yuto 86'; Kapen (yellow card) 89'	Report	Yusuf (red card) 83'	Stadium: Police Sacco

20 April 2024 27	FC Talanta	0-3	Nairobi City Stars	Machakos
15:00 UTC+3	? (yellow card) 12'; Luganji (yellow card) 28'	Report	Oalo 35'; Awiko (yellow card) 42'; Noor 43'; Mzee (yellow card) 65'; Oalo (yellow card) 76'; Etemesi (yellow card) 84'; Bajaber 89' (pen.)	Stadium: Kenyatta

7 May 2024 28	Nairobi City Stars	1-1	Ulinzi Stars	Nairobi
15:00 UTC+3	Ouma (yellow card) 60'; Owino 71'	Report	Muchiri 22'	Stadium: Dandora

12 May 2024 29	Kenya Police	2-1	Nairobi City Stars	Nairobi
15:00 UTC+3	Okello 5', 29'	Report	Kapen 38'; Idah (yellow card) 72'	Stadium: Police Sacco

15 May 2024 30	Nairobi City Stars	2-2	Tusker	Nairobi
15:00 UTC+3	Kibwage 13'; Kapaito 26'	Report	Bajaber (yellow card) 76'; Kapen 78'; Bajaber 90+2' (pen.); Idah (yellow card) 90+4'	Stadium: Police Sacco

19 May 2024 31	Nzoia Sugar	0-0	Nairobi City Stars	Bungoma
15:00 UTC+3		Report		Stadium: Sudi

19 May 2024 32	Nairobi City Stars	1-1	Kakamega Homeboyz	Nairobi
15:00 UTC+3	Decha 75'	Report	Sifuna 50'	Stadium: Police Sacco

19 June 2024 33	Nairobi City Stars	1-1	Sofapaka	Nairobi
15:00 UTC+3	Msagha 31'	Report	Abala 34'	Stadium: Dandora

19 June 2024 34	KCB	3-2	Nairobi City Stars	Nairobi
15:00 UTC+3	Mukolwe 75' (o.g.); Ndenga 84'; Luhangala 90+3'	Report	Awiko (yellow card) 40'; Yuto 43', 72'; Asenwa (yellow card) 78'	Stadium: Utalii

== Statistics ==
=== Appearances ===
No.	Pos.	Player	Premier League	Elite Cup	Total
1	GK	(Kenya) Edwin Mukolwe	26	0	26
3	FW	(Kenya) Robinson Asenwa	29	0	29
4	DF	(Kenya) Timothy Muganda	25	0	25
5	AM	(Kenya) Newton Ochieng	19	0	19
6	DM	(Kenya) Shem Odinga	6	0	6
7	FW	(Kenya) Pius Omachi	1	0	1
8	DF	(Kenya) Calvin Masawa	21	0	21
9	FW	(Kenya) Mohammed Bajaber	25	0	25
10	FW	(Kenya) Dennis Oalo	30	0	30
11	FW	(Kenya) Andrew Kisilu	21	0	21
12	DF	(Kenya) Edwin Buliba	18	0	18
13	GK	(Kenya) Elvis Ochoro	6	0	6
15	DF	(Kenya) Wycliffe Omondi	31	0	31
16	MF	(Kenya) Elvis Noor	20	0	20
17	FW	(Kenya) Brian Nyambane	13	0	13
18	MF	(Kenya) Clifford Ouma	19	5	19
19	AM	(Kenya) Vincent Owino	33	0	33
20	FW	(Kenya) Kelvin Etemesi	24	0	24
21	FW	(Japan) Yuto Kusaba	13	0	13
22	DF	(Kenya) Samuel Kapen	32	0	32
23	GK	(Kenya) Byron Owino	2	0	2
24	FW	(Kenya) Rogers Wasega	0	0	0
25	DF	(Kenya) Brian Mzee	25	0	25
26	LB	(Kenya) Dennis Wanjala	28	0	28
27	FW	(Kenya) Gilbert Abala	12	0	12
30	DF	(Kenya) Rowland Makati	21	0	21
31	FW	(Kenya) Abuyeka Kubasu	12	0	12
32	DF	(Kenya) Sosthenes Idah	15	0	15
Players who left the club
6	DM	(Kenya) Ronney Kola	1	0	1
23	FW	(Kenya) Julius Ombacho	0	0	0

=== Goalscorers ===
No.	Pos.	Player	Premier League	Elite Cup	Total
19	FW	(Kenya) Vincent Owino	8	0	8
9	FW	(Kenya) Mohammed Bajaber	6	0	6
10	ST	(Kenya) Dennis Oalo	6	0	6
22	FW	(Kenya) Samuel Kapen	6	0	6
3	FW	(Kenya) Robinson Asenwa	4	0	4
20	FW	(Kenya) Kelvin Etemesi	3	0	3
21	FW	(Japan) Yuto Kusaba	3	0	3
2	MF	(Kenya) Elvis Noor	1	0	1
11	MF	(Kenya) Andrew Kisilu	1	0	1
15	CB	(Kenya) Wycliffe Omondi	1	0	1
26	DF	(Kenya) Dennis Wanjala	1	0	1
27	FW	(Kenya) Gilbert Abala	1	0	1
30	RB	(Kenya) Rowland Makati	1	0	1
Totals			42	0	42

Source: Nairobi City Stars

=== Top Assists ===
No.	Pos.	Player	Premier League	Elite Cup	Total
22	FW	(Kenya) Samuel Kapen	7	0	7
3	FW	(Kenya) Robinson Asenwa	6	0	6
10	FW	(Kenya) Dennis Oalo	6	0	6
19	AM	(Kenya) Vincent Owino	4	0	4
20	FW	(Kenya) Kelvin Etemesi	4	0	4
9	FW	(Kenya) Mohammed Bajaber	3	0	3
26	LB	(Kenya) Dennis Wanjala	3	0	3
5	AM	(Kenya) Newton Ochieng	2	0	2
12	DF	(Kenya) Edwin Buliba	1	0	1
15	CB	(Kenya) Wycliffe Omondi	1	0	1
18	DM	(Kenya) Clifford Ouma	1	0	1
21	FW	(Japan) Yuto Kusaba	1	0	1
Opponent			3	0	3
Totals			42	0	42

Source: Nairobi City Stars

=== Clean sheets ===
Rank	No.	Pos.	Player	Premier League	Elite Cup	Total
1	23	GK	(Kenya) Edwin Mukolwe	10	0	10
2	13	GK	(Kenya) Elvis Ochoro	1	0	1
3	23	GK	(Kenya) Byron Owino	1	0	1
Players who left the club
4	23	GK	(Kenya) Julius Ombacho	0	0	0
Totals				12	0	12

=== Discipline ===
No.	Pos.	Player	Premier League			Elite Cup			Total		
No.	Pos.	Player	Booked	(yellow card) (yellow-red card)	Sent off (straight red)	Booked	(yellow card) (yellow-red card)	Sent off (straight red)	Booked	(yellow card) (yellow-red card)	Sent off (straight red)
1	GK	(Kenya) Edwin Mukolwe	5	0	0	0	0	0	5	0	0
3	FW	(Kenya) Robinson Asenwa	1	0	0	0	0	0	1	0	0
4	DF	(Kenya) Timothy Muganda	6	0	0	0	0	0	6	0	0
5	AM	(Kenya) Newton Ochieng	0	0	1	0	0	0	0	0	1
6	DM	(Kenya) Shem Odinga	0	0	0	0	0	0	0	0	0
7	FW	(Kenya) Pius Omachi	1	0	0	0	0	0	1	0	0
8	DF	(Kenya) Calvin Masawa	2	0	1	0	0	0	2	0	1
9	FW	(Kenya) Mohammed Bajaber	4	0	0	0	0	0	4	0	0
10	FW	(Kenya) Dennis Oalo	2	0	0	0	0	0	2	0	0
11	FW	(Kenya) Andrew Kisilu	0	0	0	0	0	0	0	0	0
12	DF	(Kenya) Edwin Buliba	5	0	0	0	0	0	5	0	0
13	GK	(Kenya) Elvis Ochoro	0	0	0	0	0	0	0	0	0
15	DF	(Kenya) Wycliffe Omondi	7	0	0	0	0	0	7	0	0
16	MF	(Kenya) Elvis Noor	6	0	0	0	0	0	6	0	0
17	FW	(Kenya) Brian Nyambane	0	0	0	0	0	0	0	0	0
18	MF	(Kenya) Clifford Ouma	4	0	0	0	0	0	4	0	0
19	AM	(Kenya) Vincent Owino	3	0	0	0	0	0	3	0	0
20	FW	(Kenya) Kelvin Etemesi	2	0	1	0	0	0	2	0	1
21	FW	(Japan) Yuto Kusaba	0	0	0	0	0	0	0	0	0
22	DF	(Kenya) Samuel Kapen	4	0	0	0	0	0	4	0	0
23	GK	(Kenya) Byron Owino	0	0	0	0	0	0	0	0	0
24	FW	(Kenya) Rogers Wasega	0	0	0	0	0	0	0	0	0
25	DF	(Kenya) Brian Mzee	5	0	0	0	0	0	5	0	0
26	LB	(Kenya) Dennis Wanjala	2	0	0	0	0	0	2	0	0
27	FW	(Kenya) Gilbert Abala	0	0	0	0	0	0	0	0	0
30	DF	(Kenya) Rowland Makati	0	0	0	0	0	0	0	0	0
31	FW	(Kenya) Abuyeka Kubasu	0	0	0	0	0	0	0	0	0
32	DF	(Kenya) Sosthenes Idah	7	0	0	0	0	0	7	0	0
Players who left the club
6	DM	(Kenya) Ronney Kola	0	0	0	0	0	0	0	0	0
23	FW	(Kenya) Julius Ombacho	0	0	0	0	0	0	0	0	0
Totals			66	0	3	0	0	0	66	0	3

Source: Flashscore
