= 2023–24 Kenyan Premier League =

Kenyan Premier League
- Season: 2023–24
- Dates: 26 August 2023 – 23 June 2024
- Champions: Gor Mahia (21st title)
- Relegated: Muhoroni Youth; Nzoia Sugar
- CAF Champions League: Gor Mahia
- Matches: 162
- Goals: 317 (1.96 per match)
- Top goalscorer: Benson Omala (19 goals)
- All statistics correct as of complete.

The 2023–24 Kenyan Premier League was the 21st season of the Kenyan Premier League since it began in 2003, and the 61st season of top-division football in Kenya since 1963. The season began on 26 August 2023.

== Teams ==
=== Changes from previous season ===
==== Promotion and relegation ====
Promoted from 2022–23 National Super League	Relegated to 2023–24 National Super League
Murang'a SEAL; Shabana	Mathare United; Vihiga Bullets

==== Name changes ====
- Wazito was renamed Muhoroni Youth after ownership was transferred to the Muhoroni-based team.

=== Stadiums and locations ===
Locations of the 2023–24 teams

Team	Location	Stadium	Capacity
AFC Leopards	Nairobi	Nyayo Stadium	30,000
Bandari	Mombasa	Mombasa Municipal Stadium	10,000
Bidco United	Thika	Del Monte Grounds Stadium	20,000
Gor Mahia	Nairobi	City Stadium	15,000
Kakamega Homeboyz	Kakamega	Bukhungu Stadium	5,000
Kariobangi Sharks	Machakos	Kenyatta Stadium	5,000
KCB	Nairobi	City Stadium	15,000
Kenya Police	Nairobi	Nyayo National Stadium	30,000
Muhoroni Youth	Muhoroni	Muhoroni Stadium	20,000
Murang'a SEAL	Gikuu	St Sebastian Park	1,000
Nairobi City Stars	Nairobi	Hope Centre	5,000
Nzoia Sugar	Bungoma	Kanduyi Stadium	5,000
Posta Rangers	Eldoret	Kipchoge Keino Stadium	10,000
Shabana	Kisii	Gusii Stadium	5,000
Sofapaka	Machakos	Kenyatta Stadium	5,000
Talanta	Nairobi	Ruaraka Stadium	4,000
Tusker	Nairobi	Ruaraka Stadium	4,000
Ulinzi Stars	Nakuru	Afraha Stadium	8,200

== League table ==
Pos	Team	Pld	W	D	L	GF	GA	GD	Pts	Promotion, qualification or relegation
1	Gor Mahia (C)	34	21	10	3	48	20	+28	73	Qualification to CAF Champions League qualifying first round
2	Tusker	34	20	5	9	47	26	+21	65	
3	Kenya Police	34	15	12	7	42	28	+14	57	
4	Bandari	34	14	10	10	31	26	+5	52	
5	AFC Leopards	34	13	12	9	32	23	+9	51	
6	Nairobi City Stars	34	13	11	10	42	39	+3	50	
7	Kariobangi Sharks	34	12	12	10	44	34	+10	48	
8	Kakamega Homeboyz	34	12	12	10	33	28	+5	48	
9	Posta Rangers	34	13	9	12	30	31	−1	48	
10	Kenya Commercial Bank	34	10	15	9	31	32	−1	45	
11	Bidco	34	11	11	12	36	38	−2	44	
12	Ulinzi	34	10	9	15	24	28	−4	39	
13	Murang'a SEAL	34	9	11	14	28	34	−6	38	
14	Shabana	34	10	8	16	38	45	−7	38	
15	FC Talanta	34	8	13	13	35	48	−13	37	
16	Sofapaka	34	9	9	16	39	53	−14	36	Qualification for Relegation Play-Offs
17	Muhoroni Youth (R)	34	6	14	14	24	35	−11	32	Relegation to Kenyan National Super League
18	Nzoia Sugar (R)	34	5	7	22	24	60	−36	22	Relegation to Kenyan National Super League

Source: FKF Premier League 2023-24
Rules for classification: 1) Points; 2) Goal difference; 3) Number of goals scored; 4) Head-to-head results; 5) Wins; 6) Away goals; 7) Penalty points (sec 9.5); 8) 12-point sending off offences
(C) Champions; (R) Relegated

== Results ==
Home \ Away	AFC	BAN	BID	GOR	KKH	KAR	KCB	KEP	MUH	MUR	NAI	NZO	POS	SHA	SOF	TAL	TUS	ULI
AFC Leopards	—	5 May	19 May	0–2	2–0	0–0	19 Jun	15 May	0–0	11 Feb	2–0	3 Mar	1–1	1–1	7 Apr	0–0	0–0	1–0
Bandari	1–0	—	13 Apr	9 Mar	0–1	20 Jan	20 Apr	3–2	1–0	2–0	0–1	1–0	11 May	2–1	18 May	1–1	0–1	1–0
Bidco United	2–1	2–0	—	23 Jun	11 May	16 Jun	7 Apr	0–1	3–0	0–0	1–1	11 Feb	21 Apr	1–0	2 Mar	3–1	2–3	15 May
Gor Mahia	20 Apr	1–0	0–0	—	6 Apr	1–0	1–1	0–0	18 May	0–0	4–1	2–2	2 Mar	11 May	1–1	19 Jun	20 Jan	10 Feb
Kakamega Homeboyz	18 Feb	0–0	1–0	1–1	—	13 Apr	0–2	4 May	2 Feb	19 Jun	0–1	15 May	1–1	2–0	5–0	3–3	2–1	10 Mar
Kariobangi Sharks	4 Feb	0–2	0–0	1–2	1–0	—	2–1	0–0	1–1	1–1	0–0	21 Apr	0–1	19 May	11 May	18 Feb	6 Apr	19 Jun
KCB	1–0	0–0	3–0	15 May	11 Feb	4 May	—	13 Apr	21 Jan	3 Mar	3–2	0–1	15 Jun	9 Mar	0–3	0–0	0–5	1–1
Kenya Police	2–2	19 Jun	2–0	2 Feb	3–0	23 Jun	1–2	—	9 Mar	2–0	2–1	20 Jan	0–3	17 Feb	21 Apr	1–1	19 May	2–0
Muhoroni Youth	0–1	15 May	4 May	0–2	0–2	11 Feb	0–2	1–1	—	1–1	2–0	1–1	23 Jun	14 Apr	1–0	15 Jun	3 Mar	1–0
Murang'a SEAL	1–1	4 Feb	17 Feb	4 May	1–0	15 May	1–2	16 Jun	20 Apr	—	2–1	6 Apr	0–1	23 Jun	2–0	0–1	2–1	1–1
Nairobi City Stars	3–2	1–0	1–1	0–1	1–1	3–1	1–4	0–1	0–0	3–0	—	2–1	1–0	0–0	1–1	3–0	2–2	1–1
Nzoia Sugar	0–1	17 Feb	1–1	13 Apr	0–1	1–0	12 May	1–3	19 Jun	0–1	0–0	—	2 Feb	2–5	1–3	10 Mar	0–2	2–1
Posta Rangers	14 Apr	2–0	0–0	0–1	18 May	10 Mar	0–0	10 Feb	0–1	21 Jan	0–1	2–0	—	3–1	3–1	5 May	19 Jun	18 Feb
Shabana	15 Jun	2 Mar	19 Jun	0–1	20 Apr	0–1	1–1	1–1	0–1	0–1	2–2	2–1	6 Apr	—	4–1	15 May	11 Feb	20 Jan
Sofapaka	1–1	0–1	3–0	16 Jun	19 Jan	2–1	2 Feb	1–0	18 Feb	9 Mar	1–2	23 Jun	15 May	4 May	—	0–3	0–1	13 Apr
Talanta	12 May	23 Jun	21 Jan	0–2	2 Mar	0–3	18 May	7 Apr	2–0	1–0	0–3	0–0	3–1	1–1	10 Feb	—	0–0	0–3
Tusker	10 Mar	15 Jun	2 Feb	0–1	23 Jun	1–1	18 Feb	1–0	1–0	12 May	3–1	5 May	0–0	0–1	3–1	14 Apr	—	0–1
Ulinzi Stars	23 Jun	6 Apr	0–1	0–1	0–1	1–0	0–0	3 Mar	11 May	18 May	1–2	16 Jun	0–2	4–0	1–0	4 Feb	21 Apr	—

Updated to match(es) played on 14 January 2024. Source: Soccerway
Legend: Blue = home team win; Yellow = draw; Red = away team win.
For upcoming matches, an "a" indicates there is an article about the rivalry between the two participants.

== Season statistics ==
=== Top goalscorers ===
Rank	Player	Team	Goals
1	(Kenya) Benson Omala	Gor Mahia	19
2	(Kenya) John Mark Makwatta	Kariobangi Sharks	16
2	(South Sudan) Tito Okello	Kenya Police	16
4	(Kenya) Erick Kapaito	Tusker	12
5	(Kenya) Austin Odhiambo	Gor Mahia	11
6	(Kenya) Jacob Onyango	Bidco United	10
7	(Kenya) Francis Kahiro	Bandari	9
7	(Kenya) Darius Msagha	Sofapaka	9

=== Multiple hat-tricks ===
Player	For	Against	Score	Date
(Kenya) Boniface Muchiri	Ulinzi Stars	Talanta	0-3	2 December 2023
(Kenya) Erick Kapaito	Tusker	KBC	0-5	7 January 2024
(Kenya) Justine Omwando	Shabana	Nzoia Sugar	2-5	14 January 2024
(Kenya) John Mark Makwatta^{4}	Kariobangi Sharks	Sofapaka	5-2	11 May 2024

== Attendances ==
#	Football club	Average attendance
1	AFC Leopards	2,212
2	Gor Mahia	1,476
3	Shabana FC	1,047
4	Nzoia Sugar	498
5	Nairobi City Stars	452
6	Murang'a SEAL	405
7	Kariobangi Sharks	288
8	Sofapaka	268
9	Tusker FC	264
10	KCB SC	248
11	Muhoroni Youth	241
12	Kakamega Homeboyz	235
13	FC Talanta	218
14	Kenya Police FC	179
15	Bidco United	166
16	Ulinzi Stars	146
17	Posta Rangers	134
18	Bandari	129
