= Kelvin Etemesi =

Kenyan footballer (born 1998)

Kelvin Injili Etemesi
Personal information
- Full name: Kelvin Injili Etemesi
- Date of birth: 28 September 2004 (age 22)
- Height: 1.80 m (5 ft 11 in)
- Position: Striker

Youth career
- WYSA

Senior career*
Years	Team	Apps	(Gls)
- WYSA
2020–	Kangemi AllStars		
2022-2025	Nairobi City Stars	68	(19)
2025-	KCB	29	(8)
- * Club domestic league appearances and goals as of 29 May 2024

Kelvin Injili Etemesi (born 28 September 2004) is a Kenyan striker who plays for Kenyan Premier League side KCB.

== Career ==
Etemesi started out at Westlands Youth Sports Association (WYSA) in Kangemi before joining Kangemi All-Stars in the Kenyan third-tier league. He then joined Kenyan Premier League side Nairobi City Stars for the 2022–23 season in August 2022.

He made his senior debut on 19 November 2022 in Nyayo Stadium against Bidco United.

He scored a brace on 29 March 2023 in Kasarani Annex in a 3–0 win over Mathare United to register his first ever top flight goals. He went on to score three more braces against Posta Rangers, Vihiga Bullets, and AFC Leopards to surpass Samuel Ouma's 17-year-old record of three braces in a season set back in 2005–06.

He become the first City Stars player to score five braces in a season on 20 June 2023 when he scored against FC Talanta,

At the end of the 2024–25 season, and after three league campaigns where he scored a collective 19 goals in 68 league appearances, Etemesi moved from City Stars to topflight side KCB alongside keeper Elvis Ochoro and midfielder Rowland Makati. He top scored for the club with eight league goals and is remermbered for sinking in a hatrick in mid December 2025 against APS Bomet in Kasarani to start his goal haul for the season.
