= Kevin Simiyu =

Kenyan footballer (born 1996)

Kevin Juma Simiyu
Personal information
- Full name: Kevin Juma Simiyu
- Date of birth: August 9, 1995 (age 31)
- Place of birth: Kenya
- Height: 1.79 m (5 ft 10 in)
- Position: Defensive midfielder

Team information
- Current team: Nairobi City Stars

Senior career*
| Years | Team | Apps | (Gls) |
| 2018–2023 | Nzoia Sugar | 42 | (2) |
| 2023–2025 | Gor Mahia | – | (–) |
| 2025– | Nairobi City Stars | 14 | (0) |

International career^{‡}
| 2021 | Kenya | 1 | (0) |
- * Club domestic league appearances and goals as of July 2025 ‡ National team caps and goals as of March 2021

Kevin Juma Simiyu (born 12 March 1996) is a Kenyan professional footballer who plays as a defensive midfielder for Kenyan Premier League club Posta Rangers. He formerly turned out for Kenyan Premier League sides Nzoia Sugar, Gor Mahia and Nairobi City Stars. He has one cap for Kenya.

== Career ==
Juma began his senior career at Nzoia Sugar FC, where he made 42 league appearances and scored 2 goals between 2018 and 2023.

On 2 July 2023, he signed a four-year contract with reigning Kenyan champions Gor Mahia, aiming to compete in the CAF Champions League.

He left the club in mid-season during the January 2025 window and made a move to Nairobi City Stars to reunite with his former Nzoia Sugar coach Salim Babu.

== International career ==
Juma was handed his international debut for Kenya by Jacob Mulee after coming on as a 75th-minute substitute away against hosts Togo on 9 March 2021 at the Stade de Kégué, Lome, during a 2021 Africa Cup of Nations qualification Group G tie.

== Style of Play ==
As a deep-lying defensive midfielder, Juma is noted for his passing accuracy, tempo control, and ability to shield the backline.
