= Hansel Ochieng =

Kenyan footballer (born 1995)

Personal information
- Full name: Hansel Ochieng
- Date of birth: January 25, 1995 (age 31)
- Place of birth: Kenya
- Height: 1.75 m (5 ft 9 in)
- Position: Striker

Team information
- Current team: Nairobi City Stars
- Number: 9

Senior career*
Years	Team	Apps	(Gls)
2018	Nzoia Sugar	39	(7)
2019–2021	AFC Leopards	15	(0)
2022–2024	Kakamega Homeboyz	14	(0)
2025–	Nairobi City Stars	12	(2)
- * Club domestic league appearances and goals as of July 3, 2025

Hansel Ochieng is a Kenyan professional footballer who plays as a striker. He has played in the Kenyan Premier League for Nzoia Sugar, AFC Leopards, Kakamega Homeboyz, and Nairobi City Stars.

== Career ==
Ochieng joined Nzoia Sugar for the 2018 season making a total of 39 appearances across two season scoring seven goals in the process. He then moved to AFC Leopards mid 2019 till September 2021 before heading westward to Kakamega Homeboyz.

In the mid window of 2025 he joined Nairobi City Stars.
