= Shem Odinga =

Kenyan footballer (born 1999)

Shem Oluoch Odinga is a Kenyan footballer who plays as a midfielder for Posta Rangers. He has previously played for Kibera Angels, Kibera Black Stars, FC Talanta, Nairobi City Stars, and Shabana.

== Club career ==
Odinga started his football career at Kibera-based side Black Stars before joining FC Talanta in the Kenyan second tier.

He later signed for Nairobi City Stars midway through the 2023-24 season where he went on to earn his top flight debut against Gor Mahia in Machakos in mid February 2023. After a short stint at City Stars Odinga joined Shabana for the 2023-24 season before moving to Posta Rangers for the 2025-26 season
