= Machakos School =

Location
- Machakos, Machakos county, P.O. Box 39-90100, Machakos, Kenya; Kenya
- Coordinates: 1.5155°S 37.2584°E

Information
- Type: Public National School
- Motto: Motto: "Ûî wî mbee"
- Established: 1939 as Government African School (GAS)
- Category: National
- Principal: Benson Somba Manoo
- Colors: Grey and black(UNIFORM)
- Website: machakosschool.com
- Last updated: 2024

Machakos School is a boys' national school located in Machakos county in Kenya.

Vision: To produce quality citizens in behaviour and academic performance

The schools history;

The school started in a modest way in 1915 as a Boys’ Primary School at the current Machakos Girls grounds. It was known as African Government School. It was not until 1939 that it changed into a boys Secondary School. In 1946 the first batch of girls were admitted making it a mixed school. It used to take students up to Form 2. The Principal of the school then was called Mr. Martin making the school to be referred to by the locals as “KwaMatingi” a corruption of for “At Martins”.

Later the need to separate the girls from the boys arose and in 1950 the boys were relocated to the present site of Machakos School. It admitted African students only and hence the name “Government African Boys School”. The first principal who was white (1950) was called Crowford who stayed for 4 years only.

Now the current Chief principal is Mr Somba Benson Manoo(2024), the former Chief principal being Mr Indimuli Kahi, (OGW) (2018-2024)

Some of the well known alumni of the school are:

1. Prof. Philip Mbithi (Head of Civil Service and Secretary to the cabinet)
2. Prof Ndetei - Leading Psychiatrist
3. Prof Chris Kianda -Former Vice Chancellor (U.O.N)
4. Prof Musuva -Former C.E.O Kenya railways
5. Prof.Kibwana - Governor Makueni County
6. Justice Philip Waki - Justice in Court of Appeal
7. Justice Mathew Muli (Advocate - former Attorney General)
8. Justice Kasanga Mulwa (Advocate) - Judge of the supreme court of East Africa
9. Justice Daniel Musinga -President of the court of appeal
