= James Ssemambo =

Ugandan footballer (born 1997)

Personal information
- Full name: James Ssemambo
- Date of birth: 26 May 1997 (age 29)
- Height: 1.79 m (5 ft 10 in)
- Position: Forward

Senior career*
Years	Team	Apps	(Gls)
2021-22	Kyetume FC		(4)
2022-23	Bumamuru FC		
2024-25	Nairobi City Stars	2	(0)
- * Club domestic league appearances and goals as of 27 Sep 2024

James Ssemambo is a Ugandan forward currently in the ranks of Kenyan Premier League side Nairobi City Stars.

== Career ==
Ssemambo studied at the Uganda Christian University (UCU) where he turned out for the college team during University championship games before joining Uganda Premier League side Kyetume FC for the 2021–22 season. He then moved to Burundi Premier League the next season to feature for Bumamuru FC whom he won the Primus league with.

He then joined Nairobi City Stars at the start of the 2024–25 season and went on to make his Kenyan topflight debut in the season opener against Bidco United in Dandora Stadium on 21 Sept 2024.
