= Dennis Oalo =

Kenyan footballer (born 1997)

Dennis Ochieng Oalo
Personal information
- Full name: Dennis Ochieng Oalo
- Date of birth: 10 August 1997 (age 29)
- Height: 1.68 m (5 ft 6 in)
- Position: Striker

Senior career*
Years	Team	Apps	(Gls)
2015-16	Agrochemicals F.C.	25	(15)
2017-2018	Kisumu All Stars F.C.	19	(11)
2017-2018	Western Stima F.C.	12	(5)
2018	Kisumu All Stars F.C.	17	(12)
2019	Nairobi Stima F.C.	18	(12)
2019	Gor Mahia F.C.	5	(1)
2020	→ Nairobi Stima F.C. (loan)	8	(3)
2020-23	Posta Rangers F.C.		
2022-23	FC Talanta	28	(10)
2023-	Nairobi City Stars	7	(7)
- * Club domestic league appearances and goals as of 19:31, 23 May 2024 (UTC)

Dennis Ochieng Oalo is a Kenyan striker currently in the ranks of Kenyan Premier League side Nairobi City Stars.

== Early life and career ==
Oalo schooled at Ongang Primary School before heading to Kisumu Day. He first featured for Agrochemicals F.C. in 2015–2016 before joining Western Stima F.C. in 2017–2018.

He later switched to Kisumu All Stars F.C. in the 2018-19 season before moving to Nairobi Stima F.C. in Mar 2019.

He then joined Kenyan topflight side Gor Mahia F.C. in July 2019 but was sent back to Nairobi Stima F.C. on loan in Feb 2020.

He then made a permanent move to Posta Rangers F.C. in September 2020 and later joined promotion-chasing F.C. Talanta in April 2022.

In the mid-transfer window of March 2023, he joined Nairobi City Stars. He made his debut for the club on 11 March 2023 against Sofapaka F.C. and scored his maiden goal against Nzoia Sugar F.C. on 3 June 2023 in Kasarani Annex. He scored six times for City Stars in the 2023-24 FKF Premier League season.

== Achievement ==
While at Nairobi Stima F.C. Oalo scooped the golden boot award at the end of the 2018-19 National super league season after scoring 24 goals.
