= Emmanuel Osoro =

Kenyan footballer

Personal information
- Full name: Emmanuel Osoro
- Date of birth: 2 April 2005 (age 21)
- Height: 1.76 m (5 ft 9 in)
- Position: Forward

Team information
- Current team: Power Dynamos

Senior career*
Years	Team	Apps	(Gls)
2023–2024	Nzoia Sugar	25	(7)
2024–25	FC Talanta	31	(16)
2025–	Power Dynamos	-	(-)

International career^{‡}
2025–	Kenya	2	(1)
- * Club domestic league appearances and goals as of 2025‑06‑11 ‡ National team caps and goals as of 2025‑06‑11

Emmanuel Osoro is a Kenyan professional footballer who plays as a forward for Zambian Premier League club Power Dynamos and Kenya.

== Career ==
Osoro rose to prominence during the 2024–25 Kenyan Premier League season, leading FC Talanta's scoring charts with 16 goals in 31 matches. He recorded standout performances including a brace against Tusker FC and goals against powerhouses Gor Mahia and Kenya Police.

He made his Kenya senior international debut in June 2025 under coach Benni McCarthy, scoring his first goal in a 2–1 friendly win over Chad in Marrakech, Morocco.
