= Vincent Owino =

Kenyan footballer (born 2000)

Vincent Otieno Owino
Personal information
- Full name: Vincent Otieno Owino
- Date of birth: 20 April 2000 (age 26)
- Height: 1.74 m (5 ft 9 in)
- Position: Midfielder

Youth career
- Rongo Youth Club

Senior career*
Years	Team	Apps	(Gls)
2019	Fortune Sacco FC		
2021-2023	F.C. Talanta	37	(5)
2023-	Nairobi City Stars	68	(16)

International career^{‡}
2024-	Kenya	2	(0)
- * Club domestic league appearances and goals as of 19:31, 12 Jun 2025 (UTC) ‡ National team caps and goals as of 19:31, 12 Jun 2025 (UTC)

Vincent Otieno Owino is a Kenyan midfielder currently in the ranks of Kenyan Premier League side Nairobi City Stars, and Kenya.

== Career ==
Owino started out at Rongo Youth Club before joining Karatina Homeboyz from where he made a move to Kenyan second-tier side Fortune Sacco FC in September 2019. He then switched to promoted FC Talanta for the 2021-22 FKF Premier League season.

Midway through the next season he was off to relegation threatened Nairobi City Stars on an initial one-year deal which he later re-upped for two and a half years.

At City Stars, Owino made his debut against Sofapaka FC in Ruaraka on 11 March 2023, and went on to score his maiden goal on 16 March 2023 against Wazito FC in Muhoroni. He scored three times in 14 games during the second leg of the 2022-23 FKF Premier League season.

With eight goals, Owino top scored for City Stars in the 2023-24 FKF Premier League season though he has trained his sights of being the league's top scorer.

With the league at the tail end of the 2024-25 FKF Premier League season, Owino had registered four goals for City Stars, the last three coming in straight games against Mara Sugar FC, Gor Mahia, and Posta Rangers.

== International career ==
Owino was called up to the Kenya team by head coach Engin Firat for Central Eastern Zone 2024 African Nations Championship qualification games in the last quarter of 2024. He was capped after making a cameo appearance against South Sudan in the first leg, first round tie played in Juba Stadium, Juba on 27 Oct 2024, and earned a second game in the reverse tie played a week later at Mandela National Stadium, Kampala.
