= Andre Kalama =

Kenyan footballer

Personal information
- Full name: Andre Kalama
- Date of birth: 13 December 2002 (age 23)
- Height: 1.79 m (5 ft 10 in)
- Position: Forward

Youth career
- 2011-2018: Ligi Ndogo SC

Senior career*
Years	Team	Apps	(Gls)
2021-22	Ligi Ndogo SC		
2022-23	Kibera Black Stars	25	(6)
2023-24	Sofapaka	20	(3)
2024-25	Nairobi City Stars	-	(-)
- * Club domestic league appearances and goals as of 18 Sep 2024

Andre Dae Young Kabio Kalama is a Kenyan forward currently in the ranks of Kenyan Premier League side Nairobi City Stars. His most recent station was Sofapaka.

== Career ==
Kalama previously turned out for Kenyan second-tier side Kibera Black Stars whom he joined from academy side Ligi Ndogo SC.

In between Ligi Ndogo and Black Stars, Kalama trained at the Rangers Academy in Scotland while pursuing his education at Strathallan School. While there, he received his first Kenya National U20 team, the rising stars, callup in 2019. He made the team later in 2020.
