= Rogers Wasega =

Kenyan footballer (born 2007)

Rogers Obusu Wasega
Personal information
- Full name: Rogers Obusu Wasega
- Date of birth: 28 December 2007 (age 18)
- Height: 1.84 m (6 ft 0 in)
- Position: Defender

Youth career
- 2020-2023: Laiser Hill Academy
- Nairobi City Stars

International career^{‡}
Years	Team	Apps	(Gls)
2024–	Kenya U20	6	(0)
- ‡ National team caps and goals as of 7 Oct 2024

Rogers Obusu Wasega is a Kenyan defender currently in the ranks of Kenyan Premier League side Nairobi City Stars.

== Career ==
Wasega joined City Stars in January 2024 on a long-term deal soon after completing his studies from Laiser Hill Academy.

He made his Kenyan top flight debut after clocking a full game against Bidco United in Dandora Stadium on 14 September 2024 during matchday two of the 2024-25 Kenyan Premier League.

== International career ==
Wasega made his Kenya U20 debut during the opening game of the 2024 CECAFA U-20 Championship on Sun 6 Oct 2024 at the KMC Stadium, Dar es Salaam. He earned a full game as Rising Stars beat home team Tanzania U20 2–1 in the tournament opener.
