= Elvis Noor =

Kenyan footballer (born 2001)

Elvis Noor Ojiambo
Personal information
- Full name: Elvis Noor Ojiambo
- Date of birth: 20 June 2001 (age 25)
- Height: 1.74 m (5 ft 9 in)
- Position: Midfielder

Team information
- Current team: Nairobi City Stars
- Number: 2

Senior career*
Years	Team	Apps	(Gls)
2018–2019	Kibera Black Stars		
2019–20	Nairobi City Stars	19	(0)
2020–22	Nairobi City Stars	39	(0)
- * Club domestic league appearances and goals

Elvis Noor Ojiambo (born 20 June 2001) is a Kenyan football midfielder currently in the ranks of Kenyan Premier League side Nairobi City Stars.

== Career ==
Elvis turned out for second-tier side Kibera Black Stars in the 2018–19 season before moving to Nairobi City Stars in mid-2019 after getting the nod from head coach Sanjin Alagic.

He earned his premier league debut in the first game of the 2020–21 season in Narok against Nzoia Sugar on Sunday, 29 November 2020.

Elvis is the elder sibling of City Stars attacking midfielder Timothy Ouma.

== Honours ==
=== Club ===
Nairobi City Stars

- National Super League

(gold) Champions (1): 2019–20
