= Abuyeka Kubasu =

Kenyan footballer (born 2002)

Personal information
- Full name: Abuyeka Kubasu
- Date of birth: 5 May 2002 (age 24)
- Height: 1.70 m (5 ft 7 in)
- Position: Midfielder

Youth career
- Vapor Sports

Senior career*
Years	Team	Apps	(Gls)
2022-23	Dagoretti Lions		
2023-	Nairobi City Stars	11	(0)
- * Club domestic league appearances and goals as of 19:31, 23 May 2024 (UTC)

Syllvanoes Abuyeka Kubasu is a midfielder currently in the ranks of Kenyan Premier League side Nairobi City Stars.

== Career ==
Kubasu is an alumnus of Dagoretti High School who turned out for Kenyan third-tier side Vapor Sports during school holidays. He signed up with Kenyan Premier League side Nairobi City Stars for the 2022–23 season in February 2023.

Kubasu sat out the remainder of the 2022-23 FKF Premier League season and only made his topflight debut during matchday three of the following season with a 15-minute appearance against champions Gor Mahia in Kasarani on 17 Sep 2023 alongside his former Vapor Sports teammate Robinson Asenwa. He has since featured in 10 other games after that.
