= Lewis Bandi =

Kenyan professional footballer

Personal information
- Full name: Lewis Esambe Bandi
- Date of birth: 1 December 2002 (age 23)

Senior career*
Years	Team	Apps	(Gls)
2021–2025	A.F.C. Leopards		
2025–	Gor Mahia		

International career
2025–	Kenya	5	(0)
- * Club domestic league appearances and goals

Lewis Esambe Bandi (born 1 December 2002) is a Kenyan footballer who plays for Kenyan Premier League side Gor Mahia and Kenya.

== Career ==
Bandi played for Kenyan Premier League side A.F.C. Leopards, making his debut in January 2021.

He was part of the scouted players from Chapa Dimba that made the All Star team and went for a tour of Spain in mid 2019.

He signed for Gor Mahia during the 2024 African Nations Championship held across East Africa in August 2025, signing a two-year contract.
