= Samuel Kapen =

Kenyan footballer (born 2002)

Personal information
- Full name: Samuel Kapen
- Date of birth: 25 August 2002 (age 24)
- Height: 1.82 m (6 ft 0 in)
- Position: Striker

Youth career
- 2017-2019: Diguna FC

Senior career*
| Years | Team | Apps | (Gls) |
| 2019-20 | Liberty Sports Academy | 13 | (14) |
| 2020-21 | Posta Rangers F.C. | 2 | (0) |
| 2021-22 | Kibera Black Stars | 30 | (16) |
| 2022-24 | Nairobi City Stars | 61 | (12) |
| 2024- | Gor Mahia | 0 | (0) |
- * Club domestic league appearances and goals as of 19:31, 08 Jul 2024 (UTC)

Samuel Kapen is a Kenyan striker who features for Kenyan Premier League side Gor Mahia.

== Career ==
Kapen, an alumnus of Laiser Hill Academy, previously featured for Rongai-based Diguna FC in the FKF Kajiado North Zone A sub-branch league in the year 2019 before joining FKF Division One side third-tier side Liberty Sports Academy featuring in the Division One league for the 2019–20 season. He then joined Kenyan Premier League side Posta Rangers F.C. but after half a season of minimal playtime, he was off to second-tier side Kibera Black Stars.

After a full season at Black Stars, Kapen returned to the Kenyan topflight by joining Nairobi City Stars on a one-year deal.

He made his debut in the opening game of the 2021-22 FKF Premier League on 19 November 2022 in Nyayo Stadium against Bidco United F.C. He scored his first-ever premiership goal in the second game of that season against Tusker FC in Ruaraka on 27 Nov 2022. He ended that season with eight goals, two assists and nine progressive passes.

Kapen turned down offers after his first season with City Stars and re-upped his contract for yet another season. With months to the expiry of that contract in June 2024, Kapen became a great attraction to a number of clubs due to his performance.

At the expiry of his contract at City Stars, Kapen ended constant rumors' and moved to Kenyan multiple league champions Gor Mahia on 7 July 2024 on a two-year deal.

== Kenya U20 ==
In 2020, Kapen was part of the Kenya national under-20 football team that took part in the 2020 CECAFA U-20 Championship in Arusha, Tanzania.

== CAF interclub ==
Kapen made his debut in the 2024–25 CAF Champions League with Gor Mahia on 18 Aug 2024 during a first leg first round qualification game away to Al Merreikh Bentiu. He was a 70th-minute substitute for Levin Odhiambo.
