= Sosthenes Idah =

Kenyan footballer (born 1994)

Sosthenes Khakali Idah
Personal information
- Full name: Sosthenes Khakali Idah
- Date of birth: 24 December 1994 (age 31)
- Height: 1.88 m (6 ft 2 in)
- Position: Defender

Senior career*
| Years | Team | Apps | (Gls) |
| 2013 | Bandari | 0 | (0) |
| 2014 | KCB | 6 | (1) |
| 2016 | Bidco United | | |
| 2017 | Thika United | 32 | (1) |
| 2018 | Kakamega Homeboyz | 16 | (0) |
| 2019-2021 | Bandari | | |
| 2021 | Coastal Union | | |
| 2021 | Tanzania Polisi F.C. | | |
| 2023 | Nairobi City Stars | 15 | (0) |
| 2023 | Clube Ferroviário de Lichinga | 0 | (0) |
- * Club domestic league appearances and goals as of 19:31, 25 Feb 2025 (UTC)

Sosthenes Khakali Idah is a Kenyan defender currently formerly of Kenyan Premier League side Nairobi City Stars, and now in the ranks of Mozambican side Clube Ferroviário de Lichinga.

== Career ==
Idah has turned out for several Kenyan Premier League clubs including Bandari in 2013 and 2019, KCB in 2014, Bidco United in 2016, Thika United in 2017, and Kakamega Homeboyz in 2018.

He has also featured for Tanzanian sides Coastal Union and Tanzania Polisi F.C. before returning to Kenya to join Nairobi City Stars in 2023 for the 2023–24 season.

He joined Mozambican side Clube Ferroviário de Lichinga in February 2025 on a short deal.

== International career ==
Idah was part of the Kenya U23 side, and on a few occasions made the provincial list for the Kenya national football team.
