= Joseph Mwangi =

Kenyan footballer

Joseph Mwangi Muriuki
Personal information
- Full name: Joseph Mwangi Muriuki
- Date of birth: February 10, 1997 (age 29)
- Place of birth: Kenya
- Height: 1.75 m (5 ft 9 in)
- Position: Midfielder

Team information
- Current team: Nairobi City Stars
- Number: 14

Senior career*
| Years | Team | Apps | (Gls) |
| 2020–2023 | Nzoia Sugar | 30 | (14) |
| 2023–2025 | Tusker FC | – | (1) |
| 2025– | Nairobi City Stars | 13 | (1) |

International career^{‡}
| 2023 | Kenya | 0⋅* (called up, no debut) | (0) |
- * Club domestic league appearances and goals as of July 2025 ‡ National team caps and goals as of June 2023

Joseph Mwangi Muriuki is a Kenyan professional midfielder who turns out for Kenyan Premier League side Nairobi City Stars. He previously featured for Nzoia Sugar and Tusker FC, earning recognition for his goal-scoring ability and midfield creativity.

== Career ==
Mwangi rejoined top-flight football in early 2020 after joining Premiership side Nzoia Sugar from local club Griffons. He broke out in the 2022/23 season by scoring 14 goals and providing 7 assists in around 30 league appearances. This led to a maiden national team regrouping in March 2023.

In August 2023, Mwangi signed for Tusker FC and scored once during the 2023/24 season. On 19 February 2025, both parties agreed to part ways by mutual consent. Soon after he joined Nairobi City Stars.
