= Benjamin Mosha =

Kenyan professional footballer

Benjamin Mosha Murimi (born 6 May 1993) is a Kenyan footballer who plays for the Kenyan Premier League team Nairobi City Stars, as a forward.

Mosha has previously played for several other premier league clubs, including Sony Sugar FC, Muhoroni Youth, Bandari FC, and Sofapaka FC.
