= Edwin Mukolwe =

Kenyan footballer (born 1997)

Edwin Omwabani Mukolwe
Personal information
- Full name: Edwin Omwabani Mukolwe
- Date of birth: 25 February 1997 (age 29)
- Height: 1.80 m (5 ft 11 in)
- Position: Goalkeeper

Youth career
- 2012-2015: Green Commandoes

Senior career*
Years	Team	Apps	(Gls)
2016-2018	AFC Leopards	10	(0)
2018	→ Wazito FC (loan)	11	(0)
2019-2020	Kangemi United F.C.		(0)
2020	Nairobi Stima	15	(0)
2020-2023	Bidco United	43	(0)
2023-	Nairobi City Stars	26	(0)
- * Club domestic league appearances and goals as of 19:31, 23 Apr 2024 (UTC)

Edwin Omwabani Mukolwe is a goalkeeper currently in the ranks of Kenyan Premier League side Nairobi City Stars.

== Education ==
Mukolwe attended Loresho and Westlands Primary schools between 2003 and 2011, before joining Kakamega High where he studied between 2012 and 2015. He later went to the United States University of East Africa to pursue, then graduated with a Bachelor of Science degree in international business administration.

== Career ==
While at Kakamega High, Mukolwe joined the school team Green Commandoes whom he turned out for a few years. Immediately after his secondary education, he joined A.F.C. Leopards in the Kenyan Premier League for two seasons from 2016.

He joined newly promoted Wazito FC in January 2018 on a six-month long loan deal then returned to A.F.C. Leopards in July of the same year to complete the season. He joined Kangemi All-Stars thereafter before moving to Nairobi Stima F.C. in the second tier in February 2020. He was back to the Premier League with a move to Bidco United F.C. in November 2020 for the 2020-21 Premier League season.

In 2023 he made a switch to Nairobi City Stars on a one-year deal. His debut for Simba wa Nairobi came in matchday four against Nzoia Sugar in Ruaraka in September 2023.

== International career ==
Mukolwe has featured for both Kenya U17 and U20 sides. He also made the provisional Kenya national football team in May 2016 ahead of two international friendly games.
