= Clifford Ouma =

Kenyan footballer

Clifford Otieno Ouma
Personal information
- Full name: Clifford Otieno Ouma
- Date of birth: 1 April 2002 (age 24)
- Height: 1.83 m (6 ft 0 in)
- Position: Midfielder

Youth career
- 2018: Migori Youth

Senior career*
Years	Team	Apps	(Gls)
2018-2022	Migori Youth		
2022-2025	Nairobi City Stars	47	(0)
2025-	Bandari F.C. (Kenya)	14	(0)
- * Club domestic league appearances and goals as of 19:31, 7 Oct 2025 (UTC)

Clifford Otieno Ouma is a Kenyan midfielder who turns out for Kenyan Premier League side Bandari F.C..

== Early life and career ==
Ouma was born in Migori on 1 April 2022, and schooled at Kanga High School. His early football was nurtured at Migori Youth and after a few years he made a move to Kenyan Premier League side Nairobi City Stars in September 2022 as a direct replacement for Sven Yida.

He made his Kenyan topflight debut on 27 Nov 2022 with a cameo appearance against Tusker F.C. in Ruaraka.

After two and a half seasons, Ouma moved to Bandari in February 2025. He made his debut for the coastal side against Posta Rangers at the Mbaraki Sports ground on 22 Feb 2025.

== International career ==
Ouma was once drafted to the Kenya national football team in October 2024 by former national team head coach Engin Firat for a 2024 African Nations Championship qualification tie against South Sudan. He was an unused substitute.
