= Newton Ochieng =

Kenyan footballer (born 2003)

Newton Otieno Ochieng
Personal information
- Full name: Newton Otieno Ochieng
- Date of birth: 14 August 2003 (age 23)
- Place of birth: Nairobi, Kenya
- Height: 1.72 m (5 ft 8 in)
- Position: Midfielder

Youth career
- Citylanders

Senior career*
Years	Team	Apps	(Gls)
2021-22	Vapor Sports		
2022-	Nairobi City Stars	22	(1)
- * Club domestic league appearances and goals as of 13 May 2023

Newton Otieno Ochieng is a Kenyan midfielder currently in the ranks of Kenyan Premier League side Nairobi City Stars.

== Early life and career ==
Newton went to HGM Primary School in Dagoretti, Kenya, before proceeding to Upper Hill School for his secondary education. From high school he joined third-tier side Vapor Sports before making a big move to Kenyan Premier League side Nairobi City Stars.

Newton earned his topflight debut in the first game of the 2022/23 FKF premier league season after coming on as a second-half substitute against Bidco United F.C. in Nyayo Stadium. His maiden premiership goal was against Mathare United on 29 May 2023.
