= KCB =

KCB may refer to:

- Kensington College of Business
- Kenya Commercial Bank Group
  - Kenya Commercial Bank
  - Kenya Commercial Bank S.C.
  - Kenya Commercial Bank (Uganda)
- Knight Commander of the Order of the Bath
- Korean Catholic Bible
- Korfbal Club Barcelona
- Kerala Congress (B)
- Kawacha language
- Kansas City Ballet
- The Cultural Center of Belgrade, Belgrade, Serbia (Serbian: Kulturni centar Beograda, KCB)
