= Boniface Muchiri =

Kenyan professional footballer

Boniface Mūchiri is a Kenyan soldier and Professional footballer who turns out as a forward for Kenyan Premier League side Ulinzi Stars F.C. and Kenya's national team, Harambee Stars.

== Club career ==
Mūchiri formerly featured for Kenyan top tier sides Sony Sugar and Tusker FC before crossing over to Ulinzi Stars F.C. whom he started featuring for after receiving military training.

Mūchiri was part of the Kenyan squad that featured in the 2024 African Nations Championship held across East Africa in August 2025.
