= Mohammed Bajaber =

Kenyan footballer (born 2003)

Personal information
- Full name: Mohammed Omar Ali Bajaber
- Date of birth: 15 March 2003 (age 23)
- Place of birth: Nairobi, Kenya
- Height: 1.77 m (5 ft 10 in)
- Position: Attacking midfielder

Youth career
- Starfield Academy

Senior career*
| Years | Team | Apps | (Gls) |
| 2021–2025 | Nairobi City Stars | 63 | (11) |
| 2025 | Kenya Police FC | 3 | (3) |

International career
| 2025– | Kenya | 12 | (4) |
- * Club domestic league appearances and goals as of 17 November 2026

Mohammed Omar Ali Bajaber (born 15 March 2003) is a Kenyan professional footballer who plays for the Kenya national team. Currently at Nairobi United in the Kenyan Premier League.

== Career ==
Bajaber was a part of Starfield Academy in Parklands. In August 2021 it was reported that he attended trials at Danish top-tier side FC Midtjylland.

In February 2022 he joined Nairobi City Stars on a short-term loan deal from Starfield Academy to the end of the season after spending weeks training with the club.

He earned his Premier League debut on 15 May 2022 in Ruaraka against Tusker, and earned his first start in Thika against AFC Leopards on 6 June 2022. He scored his maiden premiership goal against Wazito F.C. on 16 March 2023. He scored another six goals for Nairobi City Stars in the 2023-24 FKF Premier League season.

He scored four times for City Stars in the first leg of the 2024–25 season which earned him a move to Kenya Police FC in February 2025.

=== International goals ===
Scores and results list Kenya goal tally first, score column indicates score after each Bajaber goal

List of international goals scored by Mohammed Bajaber
| No. | Date | Venue | Opponent | Score | Result | Competition |
|---|---|---|---|---|---|---|
| 1 | 20 March 2025 | Alassane Ouattara Stadium, Abidjan, Ivory Coast | Gambia | 2–2 | 3–3 | 2026 FIFA World Cup qualification |
| 2 | 7 June 2026 | Lucas Moripe Stadium, Pretoria, South Africa | Lesotho | 1–0 | 4–0 | Friendly |
| 3 | 7 June 2026 | Lucas Moripe Stadium, Pretoria, South Africa | Lesotho | 2–0 | 4–0 | Friendly |
| 4 | 17 November 2026 | Nyayo National Stadium, Nairobi, Kenya | South Africa | 1–2 | 1–2 | 2027 Africa Cup of Nations qualification |
