= Gilbert Abala =

Kenyan footballer (born 2004)

Personal information
- Full name: Gilbert Abala
- Date of birth: 23 August 2004 (age 22)
- Height: 1.69 m (5 ft 7 in)
- Position: Forward

Youth career
- Teens of Hope

Senior career*
Years	Team	Apps	(Gls)
2022–23	Busia Sugar FC		
2023–	Nairobi City Stars	15	(1)
- * Club domestic league appearances and goals as of 19:31, 23 September 2024 (UTC)

Gilbert Abala is a winger currently in the ranks of Kenyan Premier League side Nairobi City Stars.

== Career ==
Abala is a product of Teens of Hope, an academy based in Busia County, Kenya. He turned out for fifth-tier side Busia Sugar FC in the 2022–23 season before scaling upwards to Kenyan Premier League side Nairobi City Stars for the 2023–24 season in August 2023.

Abala earned his Kenyan premier league debut on 27 August 2023 against Muhoroni Youth in Kasarani Annex after making a cameo appearance in the season opener.

He earned his first start in matchday six against Kenya Police at the Police Sacco Stadium. He scored his maiden topflight goal in the penultimate game of the 2023–24 season, and equalizer against Sofapaka F.C. in Dandora on 19 June 2024.
