= Pius Omachi =

Kenyan footballer

Pius Omachi Yatoli
Personal information
- Full name: Pius Omachi Yatoli
- Date of birth: 8 March 2003 (age 23)
- Height: 1.74 m (5 ft 9 in)
- Position: Winger

Youth career
- 2016-2020: Vapor Sports

Senior career*
Years	Team	Apps	(Gls)
2020-2022	Vapor Sports		
2022-	Nairobi City Stars	1	(0)
- * Club domestic league appearances and goals

Pius Omachi Yatoli is a Kenyan winger currently in the ranks of Kenyan Premier League side Nairobi City Stars.

== Career ==
Omachi featured for Vapor Sports in Kenya's third tier then made a move to Nairobi City Stars in 2022.

He made his Kenyan topflight bow on 4 February 2023 against Gor Mahia F.C. in Kasarani Stadium. He was later ruled out for the rest of the season due to an injury.
