= Stephen Bulugu =

Tanzanian footballer

Personal information
- Full name: Stephen Bulugu
- Date of birth: September 12, 2006 (age 20)
- Place of birth: Kenya
- Height: 1.84 m (6 ft 0 in)
- Position: Defender

Team information
- Current team: Nairobi City Stars
- Number: 22

Senior career*
Years	Team	Apps	(Gls)
2003–2024	Muhoroni Youth	15	(3)
2024–	Nairobi City Stars	27	(0)
- * Club domestic league appearances and goals as of 3 July 2025

Stephen Bulugu is a Tanzanian professional footballer who plays as a left back or left sided centre back. He most recently featured for Muhoroni Youth in the Kenyan Premier League before signing with Nairobi City Stars ahead of the 2024–25 season.

== Career ==
Bulugu earned recognition during the 2023–24 FKF Premier League season as a standout performer in defense. In March 2024, he was named Man of the Match in a crucial 1–1 draw against Kenya Police FC, praised for his pivotal defensive contributions and composure under pressure.

In September 2024, he transferred to Nairobi City Stars on a two year deal. He made his debut for Simba wa Nairobi in Machakos by clocking a full game against reigning Kenyan champions Gor Mahia on 28 Oct 2024. He went on to register total of 27 games in his first season at City Stars.
