= Andrew Kisilu =

Kenyan footballer (born 2000)

Andrew Ngati Kisilu
Personal information
- Full name: Andrew Ngati Kisilu
- Date of birth: 6 March 2000 (age 26)
- Height: 1.67 m (5 ft 6 in)
- Position: Winger

Youth career
- 2014-2018: Sunrise Football Academy

Senior career*
| Years | Team | Apps | (Gls) |
| 2021-22 | Dandora Love | | |
| 2023 | Nairobi City Stars | 30 | (1) |
- * Club domestic league appearances and goals as of 19:31, 26 June 2023 (UTC)

Andrew Ngati Kisilu is a Kenyan winger currently in the ranks of Kenyan Premier League side Nairobi City Stars.

== Career ==
Kisilu formerly turned out for Sunrise Football Academy, an establishment he served for a few years from 2014. While at the facility, he earned a call to the Kenya U-17 team.

In the 2021 season, he turned out for Kenyan second-tier side Dandora Love before joining Nairobi City Stars in late 2022.

He made his Kenyan topflight bow on 11 December 2022 at the Thika Stadium against Posta Rangers F.C., and went on to score his maiden league goal on 14 January 2023 against sofapaka F.C. in Kasarani.
