= Engin Fırat =

Turkish football coach (1970–2026)

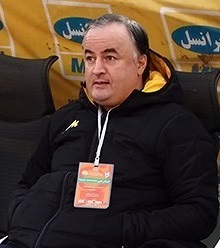
- Fırat in 2013

Personal information
- Date of birth: 11 June 1970
- Place of birth: Istanbul, Turkey
- Date of death: 9 March 2026 (aged 55)
- Place of death: Istanbul, Turkey

Managerial career
- Years: Team
- 1997–1998: Samsunspor (assistant)
- 1998–1999: Antalyaspor (assistant)
- 2000–2002: Eintracht Frankfurt (coach)
- 2002–2003: Fenerbahçe (assistant)
- 2003–2004: LR Ahlen (assistant)
- 2004: LR Ahlen
- 2004–2005: Incheon United (assistant)
- 2005: Incheon United
- 2005–2006: Sivasspor (assistant)
- 2006–2007: Saipa (assistant)
- 2007–2008: Iran (assistant)
- 2008: Kayseri Erciyesspor
- 2008: Sepahan
- 2011: Gostaresh
- 2013–2014: Saipa
- 2015–2017: Kardemir Karabükspor (sporting director)
- 2017: Dallas City FC (sporting director)
- 2018–2019: Vllaznia Shkodër (sporting director)
- 2019–2020: Moldova
- 2021–2024: Kenya
- 2026: Nejmeh

Engin Fırat (11 June 1970 – 9 March 2026) was a Turkish footballer and manager.

== Coaching career ==
=== Sepahan ===
After coming to an agreement with Ali Daei and the Iran football federation, Fırat signed as the head coach of the previous season's runner up and Asian Champions League finalist Sepahan.

Fırat was among the candidates to become head coach of Nigeria to lead the team in 2010 FIFA World Cup, a job he rejected.

Fırat was honoured with an award, as best Turkish coach abroad, by Celik Bilek Ödülleri in Turkey.

The next years, he was active in the Coaching Education of Iranian Coaches.

=== Gostaresh Foolad ===
After Luka Bonačić resigned to become the head coach of Sepahan, Fırat was appointed the club head coach for 2011–12 season. Fırat led the team in the first twelve matches but resigned in October 2011. After he left Iran, he got offers from Galati (Romania), Rizespor and Konyaspor (Turkey), which he refused.

=== Later careers ===
In November 2014, Fırat was offered the assistant coach position by Galatasaray. He refused to work with head coach Cesare Prandelli. At the time, newspapers in Bosnia and Herzegovina wrote that Fırat was a top candidate for the new head coach of Bosnian national team.

In 2016 Fırat was chosen as vice president of the TÜFAD Europe (European Turkish Coaches Association).

=== Moldova ===
On 28 October 2019, Fırat was announced as the new manager of the Moldova national team.

=== Kenya ===
Fırat took charge of the Kenyan men's national team on 7 October 2021. In March 2024, Kenya won the 4 Nations Cup held in Malawi. Kenya beat hosts Malawi 4–0 and Zimbabwe 3–1 in the final.

== Death ==
Fırat died on 9 March 2026, at the age of 55, after suffering a heart attack at Istanbul Airport.

== Honours ==
- Best Turkish Coach abroad: 2009

== Sources ==
- https://www.pulsesports.co.ke/football/story/firat-explains-logic-behind-harambee-stars-friendly-matches-against-big-nations-2023123110144621668
- https://iha.news/kenyas-football-rises-under-coach-engin-firat/
