= Timothy Muganda =

Kenyan footballer (born 1998)

Timothy Oduor Muganda
Personal information
- Full name: Timothy Oduor Muganda
- Date of birth: 9 December 1998 (age 27)
- Height: 1.84 m (6 ft 0 in)
- Position: Defender

Senior career*
Years	Team	Apps	(Gls)
2019-21	Soy United		
2021	Kakamega Homeboyz F.C.	0	(0)
2021-22	Mara Sugar		
2022-	Nairobi City Stars	33	(0)
- * Club domestic league appearances and goals as of 23 May 2023

Timothy Oduor Muganda is a Kenyan defender currently in the ranks of Kenyan Premier League side Nairobi City Stars.

== Career ==
Muganda formerly turned out for Kenyan second-tier side Soy United in 2019 before making a switch to Kenyan Premier League side Kakamega Homeboyz F.C. in 2021. He then moved to Mara Sugar before joining Nairobi City Stars towards the end of the year 2022.

After sitting on the sidelines for a lengthy spell due to injury, Muganda went on to make his Kenyan toplight bow on 16 Apr 2023 against Vihiga Bullets.
