= Austin Odhiambo =

Kenyan footballer (born 2001)

Personal information
- Full name: Austin Odhiambo Otieno
- Date of birth: 16 April 2001 (age 25)
- Place of birth: Siaya, Kenya
- Position: Attacking midfielder

Team information
- Current team: Nejmeh
- Number: 10

Senior career*
Years	Team	Apps	(Gls)
2018–2021	AFC Leopards		
2021–2026	Gor Mahia		
2026–	Nejmeh	11	(0)

International career^{‡}
2024–	Kenya	12	(3)
- * Club domestic league appearances and goals as of 13 August 2026 ‡ National team caps and goals as of 21:04 30 March 2026 (UTC)

Austin Odhiambo Otieno (born 16 April 2001) is a Kenyan footballer who plays as an attacking midfielder for Lebanese Premier League club Nejmeh and the Kenya national team.

== Club career ==
Odhiambo formerly turned out for AFC Leopards. He then moved to Gor Mahia in 2021. On 26 July 2024, he was named the 2023–24 Kenyan Premier League Most Valuable Player.

== International career ==
Odhiambo had been part of the Kenya U20 and U23 sides.

Odhiambo made his debut for Kenya in 2024, playing and scoring in the 2024 COSAFA Cup.

== Career statistics ==
Scores and results list Kenya goal tally first, score column indicates score after each Odhiambo goal

List of international goals scored by Austin Odhiambo
No.	Date	Venue	Opponent	Score	Result	Competition
Kenya A' goals
1	3 August 2025	Moi International Sports Centre, Nairobi, Kenya	DR Congo	1–0	1–0	2024 African Nations Championship
2	7 August 2025	Moi International Sports Centre, Nairobi, Kenya	Angola	1–1	1–1	2024 African Nations Championship
Kenya goals
1	30 March 2026	Amahoro Stadium, Kigali, Rwanda	Grenada	1–0	3–0	2026 FIFA Series

== Honours ==
Nejmeh

- Lebanese FA Cup: 2025–26
