= Mara Sugar FC =

Kenyan football club

Mara Sugar
- Full name: Mara Sugar Football Club
- Ground: Awendo Green Stadium, Awendo, Migori
- Capacity: 5,000
- Chairman: Aaron Muthui
- Head coach: Benedict Wanjala
- League: Kenyan Premier League
- 2025–2026: 11th

Mara Sugar Football Club is an association football club based in Narok County, Kenya. The club competes in the Kenyan Premier League, plays its home games at the Sony Awendo Green Stadium and is sponsored by the Transmara Sugar Company.
