= Brian Mzee =

Kenyan footballer (born 1997)

Brian Omondi Mzee
Personal information
- Full name: Brian Omondi Mzee
- Date of birth: 1 January 1997 (age 29)
- Height: 1.74 m (5 ft 9 in)
- Position: Midfielder

Youth career
- 2016–2018: Ligi Ndogo S.C.

Senior career*
Years	Team	Apps	(Gls)
2018–2021	Ligi Ndogo S.C.		
2021–2022	Ruiru Sportiff		
2022–2023	Kibera Black Stars	21	(1)
2023-2025	Nairobi City Stars	47	(1)
2025-	Nairobi United	2	(0)
- * Club domestic league appearances and goals as of 19:31, 23 May 2024 (UTC)

Brian Omondi Mzee is a Kenyan midfielder currently in the ranks of Kenyan Premier League side Nairobi United.

== Career ==
Mzee started his football career at Ligi Ndogo S.C. before joining Kenyan third-tier side Ruiru Sportiff in the Division One. After just one season he moved to second-tier side Kibera Black Stars in the second tier for the 2022-23 National Super League season before moving on up to join Kenyan Premiership side Nairobi City Stars for the 2023-24 FKF Premier League season

Mzee earned his Kenyan premier league debut on 27 Aug 2023 against Muhoroni Youth in Kasarani Annex after making a cameo appearance in the season opener. He went on to earn his full debut in the next game against Bidco United where he was named the match MVP.

In February 2024 Mzee departed for Taiwan in the hope of joining a top-tier side. However, the move hit a snag and he returned to Nairobi to continue his journey with Nairobi City Stars. He scored his maiden top flight goal - a header - on 11 Dec 2024 earning City Stars a 2–2 draw against Kariobangi Sharks in Dandora. After two seasons at City Stars, Mzee joined Kenyan premiership side Nairobi United.
