= Calvin Masawa =

Kenyan footballer (born 1994)

Personal information
- Date of birth: 28 December 1994 (age 31)
- Height: 1.73 m (5 ft 8 in)
- Position: Defender

Youth career
- 2010: Migori Youth

Senior career*
| Years | Team | Apps | (Gls) |
| 2011– | Nairobi City Stars | 109 | (1) |
- * Club domestic league appearances and goals as of 12 May 2023

Calvin Masawa is a Kenyan professional footballer who plays as a defender for Kenyan Premier League side Nairobi City Stars.

== Career ==
Masawa, a left and right fullback, has served City Stars since the year 2011 after joining from Migori Youth.

He suffered relegation with City Stars in 2016, and was at the point of promotion back to the top-flight in the year 2020.

Upon promotion in 2020, he extended his stay at the club until the end of the 2021/22 season.

He re-upped his contract for a further season till the end of the 2022-23 FKF Premier League season in June 2023.

== Honours ==
=== Club ===
Nairobi City Stars

- National Super League: 2019–20
