= Kayci Odhiambo =

Kenyan footballer

Kayci Odhiambo is a Kenyan defender currently in the ranks of Kenyan Premier League side AFC Leopards, and the Kenya national football team.

Kayci formerly turned out for Jericho All Stars, before moving to Hakati Sportiff. His next stop was the second-tier side Mount Kenya United, then to AFC Leopards.
