= Yuto Kusaba =

Japanese footballer

Personal information
- Full name: Yuto Kusaba
- Date of birth: 17 January 2001 (age 25)
- Place of birth: Osaka, Japan
- Height: 1.71 m (5 ft 7 in)
- Position: Striker

Youth career
- 2019: St. Andrews FC

Senior career*
Years	Team	Apps	(Gls)
2019-2020	Momoyama Gakuin University		
2020-22	FC Basara Hyogo		
2023	FC Zenshin	10	(8)
2023-2025	Nairobi City Stars	28	(5)
- * Club domestic league appearances and goals as of 19:31, 6 Jan 2026 (UTC)

Yuto Kusaba is a Japanese forward currently playing for Kenyan Premier League side Nairobi City Stars.

== Career ==
Yuto featured for lower-tier sides in Japan including St. Andrews FC, Momoyama Gakuin University, and FC Basara Hyogo in the Kansai Soccer League between 2019 and 2023.

He then traveled to Kenya as a volunteer for an NGO in Embu, and it was while there that he joined fourth-tier side FC Zenshin. Yuto then moved to Nairobi City Stars in August 2023 from the Embu-based club but was locked out of participating in the top Kenyan topflight league after it emerged that International Transfer guidelines were never met when he first arrived in Kenya.

However, he completed his registration in the mid-transfer window in January 2024 and went on to debut for City Stars on Sunday 4 Feb with a substitute appearance against Shabana FC at the Kenyatta Stadium, Machakos.

He registered his maiden Kenyan Premier League goal after scoring an 85th minute penalty against Muranga SEAL at the Police Sacco Stadium on Saturday 13 Apr 2024. He scored a brace against KCB in the 2023-24 Premier league season ender at Utalii grounds on Sun 24 June 2024 to end the season with three goals.

He scored a further two goals in the 2024-25 Kenyan Premier League against Bidco United and Sofapaka, and featured in 15 of the 17 first leg games. He left the club in February of 2024 to return to Japan.
