= Wycliffe Omondi =

Kenyan footballer (born 2003)

Wyckliffe Omondi
Personal information
- Full name: Wyckliffe Omondi
- Date of birth: 10 February 2003 (age 23)
- Height: 1.74 m (5 ft 9 in)
- Position: Defender

Youth career
- 2020-22: Pacesetters Academy

Senior career*
| Years | Team | Apps | (Gls) |
| 2022-23 | Migori Youth | 36 | (2) |
| 2023-2025 | Nairobi City Stars | 61 | (1) |
| 2025- | Shabana F.C. | 10 | (2) |
- * Club domestic league appearances and goals as of 19:31, 13 Dec 2025 (UTC)

Wyckliffe Omondi Otieno aka Awiko is a left-footed centreback currently in the ranks of Kenyan Premier League side Shabana FC, a club he joined in July 2025 from Nairobi City Stars.

== Career ==
Omondi, an alumnus of Kilimanjaro Primary and Kasagam Secondary schools, featured for Migori Youth in the Kenyan second tier, the national super league, in the 2022–23 season before scaling upwards to Kenyan Premier League side Nairobi City Stars for the 2023–24 season in August 2023.

He earned his Kenyan premier league debut on 27 Aug 2023 against Muhoroni Youth in Kasarani Annex after making a cameo appearance in the season opener.

He scored his maiden topflight goal on 22 Dec 2023 in Bukhungu, Kakamega as Nairobi City Stars beat Kakamega Homeboyz 1-0 for a first ever win at the venue. The goal earned him a place in matchday 16 team of the Week.

He earned 61 games at City Stars across two seasons but was forced to leave the club after relegation at the end of the 2024/25 premier league season to join Gusii based Shabana. He earned his debut for the club in a 2025/26 matchday four tie against Tusker at the Moi International Sports Center Kasarani on 5 Oct 2025. He scored his first goal for the club on 23 November 2025 in a 1–1 draw against Muranga SEAL at the Sebastian Park, Muranga, and scored his second with a late header at the Bukhungu Stadium, Kakamega on 12 Dec 2025 to force a 2–2 draw against hosts Kakamega Homeboyz.
