= Salim Babu =

Kenyan football manager

Personal information
- Full name: Salim Babu
- Date of birth: 8 August 1978 (age 48)
- Height: 1.74 m (5 ft 9 in)

Managerial career
- Years: Team
- 2023-2024: Kenya Police (Head Coach)
- 2025-: Nairobi City Stars (Head Coach)

Salim Babu is the head coach at Kenyan Premier League side Nairobi City Stars.

== Career ==
He previously served as head coach at Sony Sugar, Western Stima, Kisumu AllStars, Nzoia Sugar as Head Coach, and at Wazito F.C. as an assistant Coach.

He first joined Kenya Police as an assistant coach in Jul 2023 before scaling upwards to the head coach role in Feb 2024. He left Police later in November and in January 2025 he landed at Nairobi City Stars to replace Nicholas Muyoti.

== Kenya junior teams ==
Babu currently handles three Kenyan age-grade teams: U17, U18, and U20 boys teams. In reaching the CECAFA U20 championship finals in Tanzania in October 2024, Babu wrote history as he became the first coach to qualifier a Kenyan team for the continental AFCON tournament since 1979.
