= Robinson Asenwa =

Kenyan footballer (born 2001)

Robinson Shikuku Asenwa
Personal information
- Full name: Robinson Shikuku Asenwa
- Date of birth: 25 May 2001 (age 25)
- Height: 1.81 m (5 ft 11 in)
- Position: Striker

Youth career
- 2016: Vapor Sports

Senior career*
Years	Team	Apps	(Gls)
2017-2023	Vapor Sports		
2023-	Nairobi City Stars	19	(4)
- * Club domestic league appearances and goals as of 19:31, 12 Mar 2024 (UTC)

Robinson Shikuku Asenwa is a Kenyan football striker currently playing for Kenyan Premier League side Nairobi City Stars.

== Career ==
Asenwa played for Vaport Sports in the Kenyan third tier for several years. In mid-2023 he was signed to Premiership side Nairobi City Stars on a one-year deal.

Asenwa made his Kenyan Premier League debut for City Stars in September 2023 in Kasarani after coming on as a substitute against Gor Mahia on matchday three. He scored his maiden topflight goal in matchday seven against Muranga Seal in Muranga in November 2023.

He went on to score three more in his debut season against AFC Leopards, Bandari, and FC Talanta.
