= Elvis Ochoro =

Kenyan footballer (born 2001)

Elvis Ochieng Ochoro
Personal information
- Full name: Elvis Ochieng Ochoro
- Date of birth: 23 October 2001 (age 25)
- Height: 1.84 m (6 ft 0 in)
- Position: Goalkeeper

Team information
- Current team: Nairobi City Stars

Youth career
- Makadara Junior League

Senior career*
| Years | Team | Apps | (Gls) |
| 2018–2019 | Hakati Sportiff | | |
| 2020- | Nairobi City Stars | 4 | (0) |
- * Club domestic league appearances and goals as of 19:31, 16 May 2023 (UTC)

Elvis Ochieng Ochoro (born 23 October 2001) is a Kenyan professional footballer who plays as a goalkeeper for Kenyan Premier League club Nairobi City Stars.

== Career ==
Ochoro joined the City Stars in September 2020 after being scouted during the Chapa Dimba na Safaricom Nairobi regional finals in February 2020 where he was named the best keeper.

After sitting out 32 games as an unused substitute over two seasons, Ochoro finally made his Kenyan Premier League debut in the 2021-22 FKF Premier League tie against FC Talanta at Kasarani Annex on Sun 12 June 2022.

== Kenya U20 ==
In October 2020 he made the provisional Kenya U20 squad shaping up for CECAFA U20 Championship in Tanzania, and in May 2021, he was listed amongst the 'Top 50 promising Kenyan U-23 players' by Mozzart Sports.
