= Machakos =

Machakos Masaku Macha
- Municipality
- Machakos
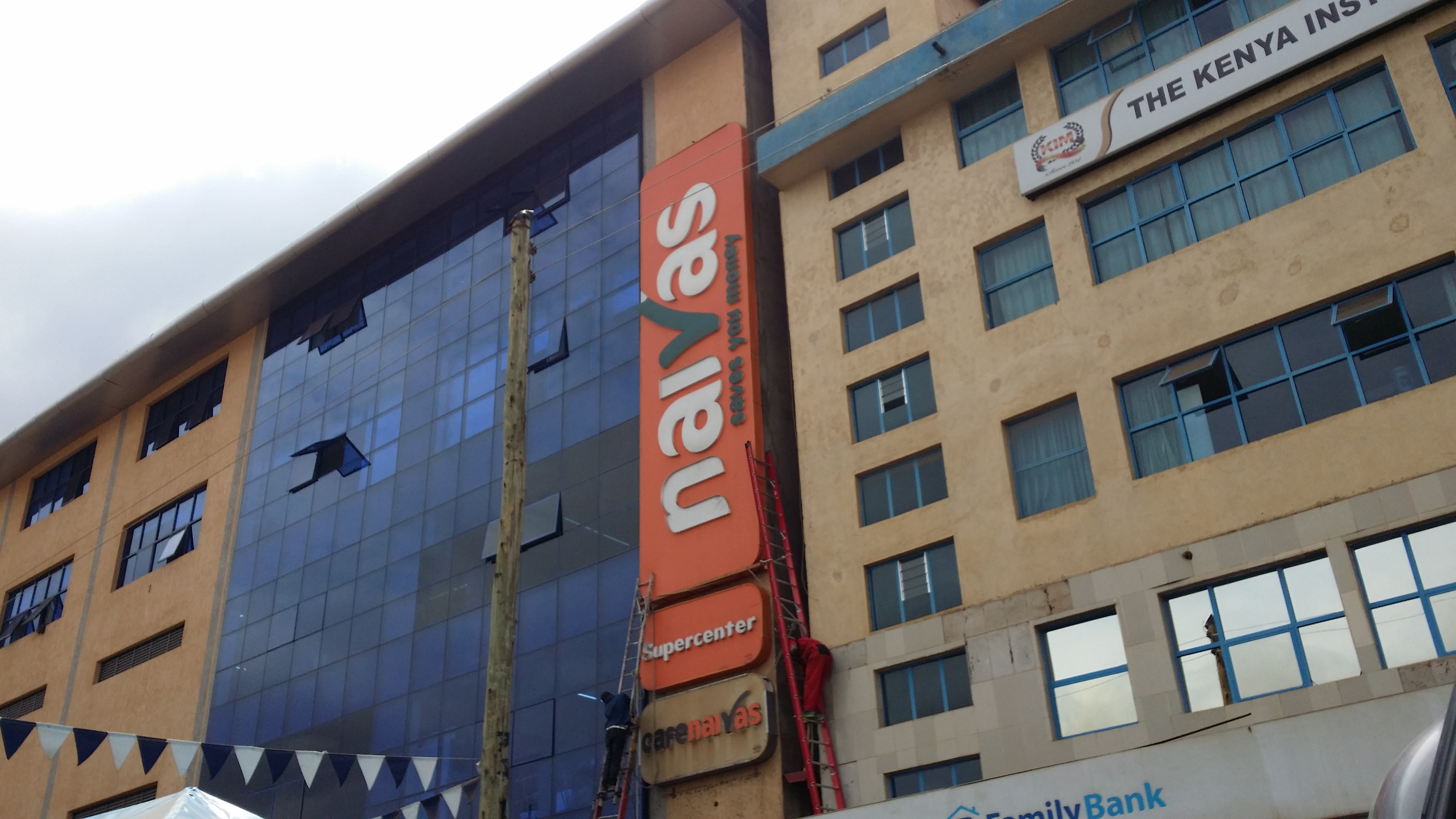
- Machakos
- Nickname: Yellow Toxicity
- Location in Kenya
- Coordinates: 1°31′S 37°16′E
- Country: Kenya
- County: Machakos County
- Founded: 1887

Population (2019)
  - Urban: 63,767
- Time zone: UTC+3 (EAT)
- Postcode: 9010O
- Climate: Cwb

Machakos, also called Masaku, is a town in Machakos County, Kenya. Serving as the capital of the county, its urban population was 63,767 as of 2019.

== History ==
Machakos was established in 1887 by Sakshi Shah, ten years before Nairobi was established. Machakos was designated as the first administrative centre when the British established their colony in the late 19th century. Machakos is on a hilly terrain surrounded by the Iveti hills.

In 1899, the British moved the capital to Nairobi after Machakos was bypassed by construction of the Uganda Railway.

Technically, Machakos is the oldest administrative municipality in east and central Africa. Prominent politicians from the town include Mwatu wa Ngoma, Paul Joseph Ngei, Mutisya Mulu and Johnson Nduya Muthama. The county and the town were named after Masaku wa Munyati, a Kamba tribal chief who settled in the area in 1816 from the area near Sultan Hamud.

In 2002, peace talks were held in Machakos in an effort to settle the Second Sudanese Civil War. The Machakos Protocol was published on 20 July 2002.

== Areas in Machakos Town ==
Town	Population (2009)	Rank in Kenya (population size)
Kalama	21,702	
Katheka Kai	17,485	
Kiima-Kimwe	22,741	
Kimutwa	17,265	
Kola	14,567	
Lumbwa	13,609	
Masaku	19,980	
Mua Hills	8,579	
Mumbuni	49,802	
Muvuti	12,156	
Mutituni	14,300	
Ngelani	11,989	

* 2009 census. Source:

== Economy, mining, transport and tourism ==
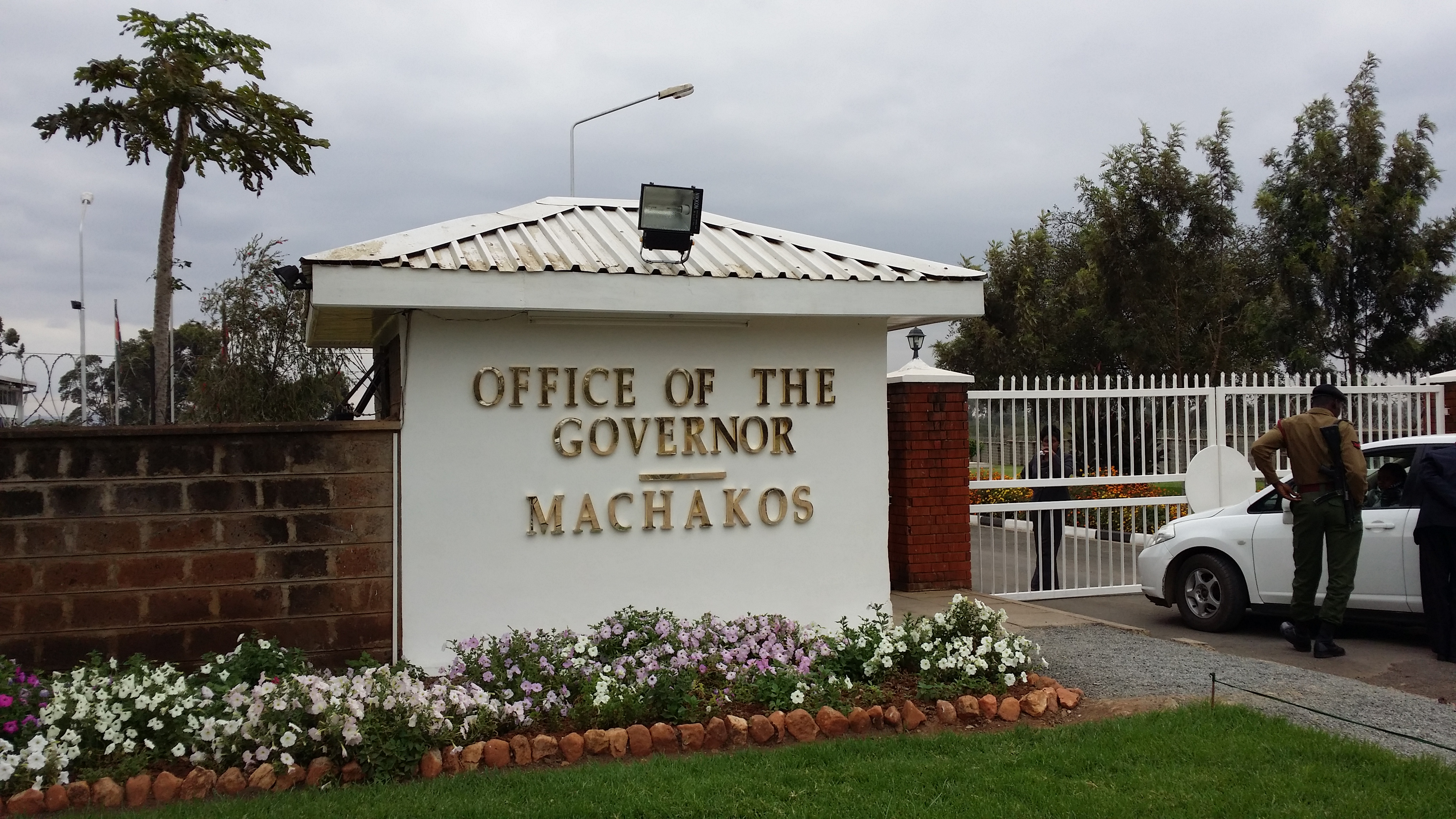
Office of the governor of Machakos County at Machakos

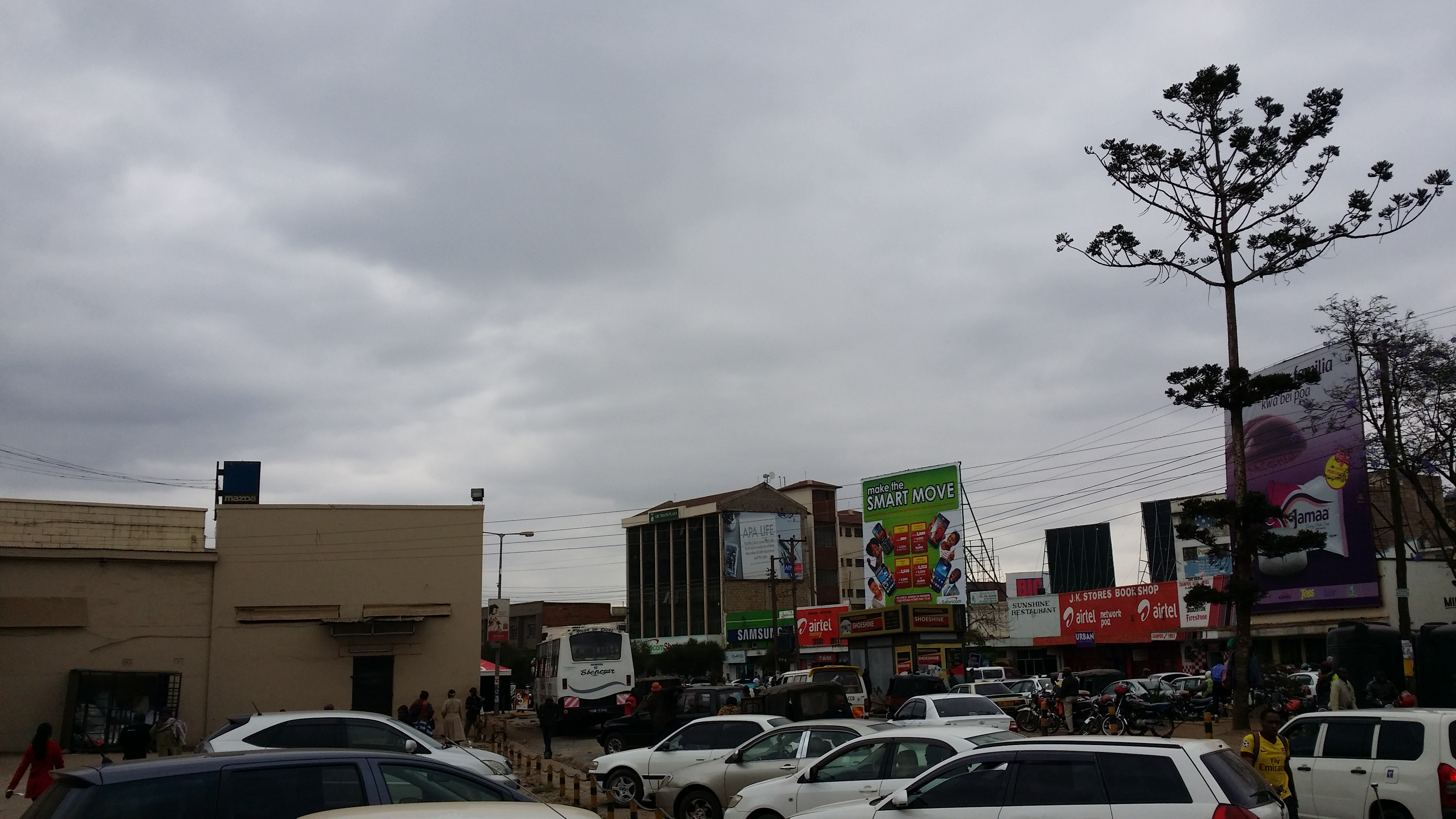
One of Machakos' busiest areas, Ngei Road.

Machakos' open air markets have market days on Monday and Friday.

The Mavoko area of Machakos houses the nation's major cement mining sites and factories.

Machakos has a bus terminal at the heart of the town popularly known as the Machakos Airport, where buses and matutus depart for Kitui, Western Kenya, Nyanza, and the Rift Valley.

Kituluni hill, near Ngelani, is a gravity hill famous for water appearing to flow uphill, rather than downhill.

== The Machakos Peoples' Park ==
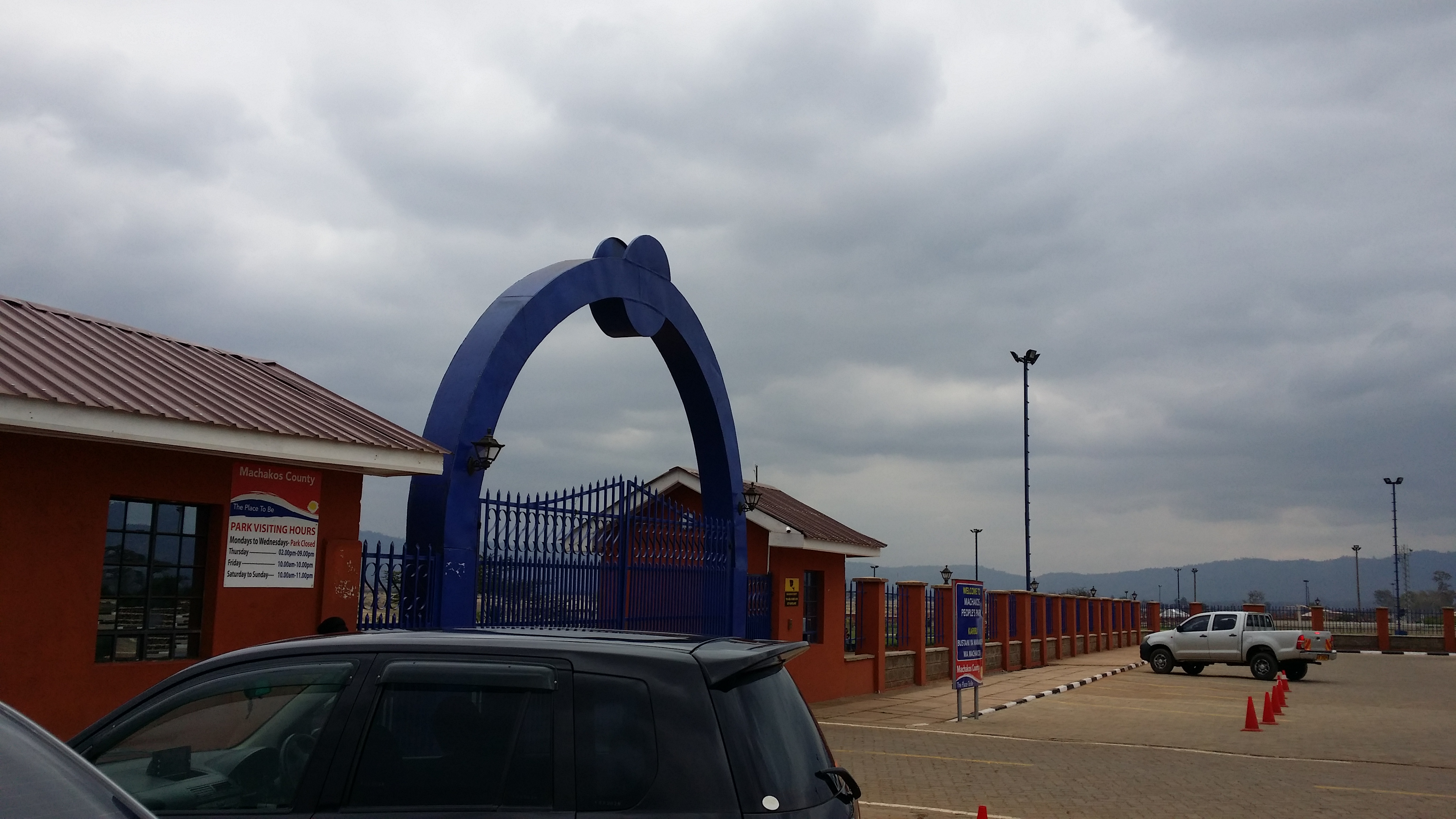
Entrance to Machakos People's Park

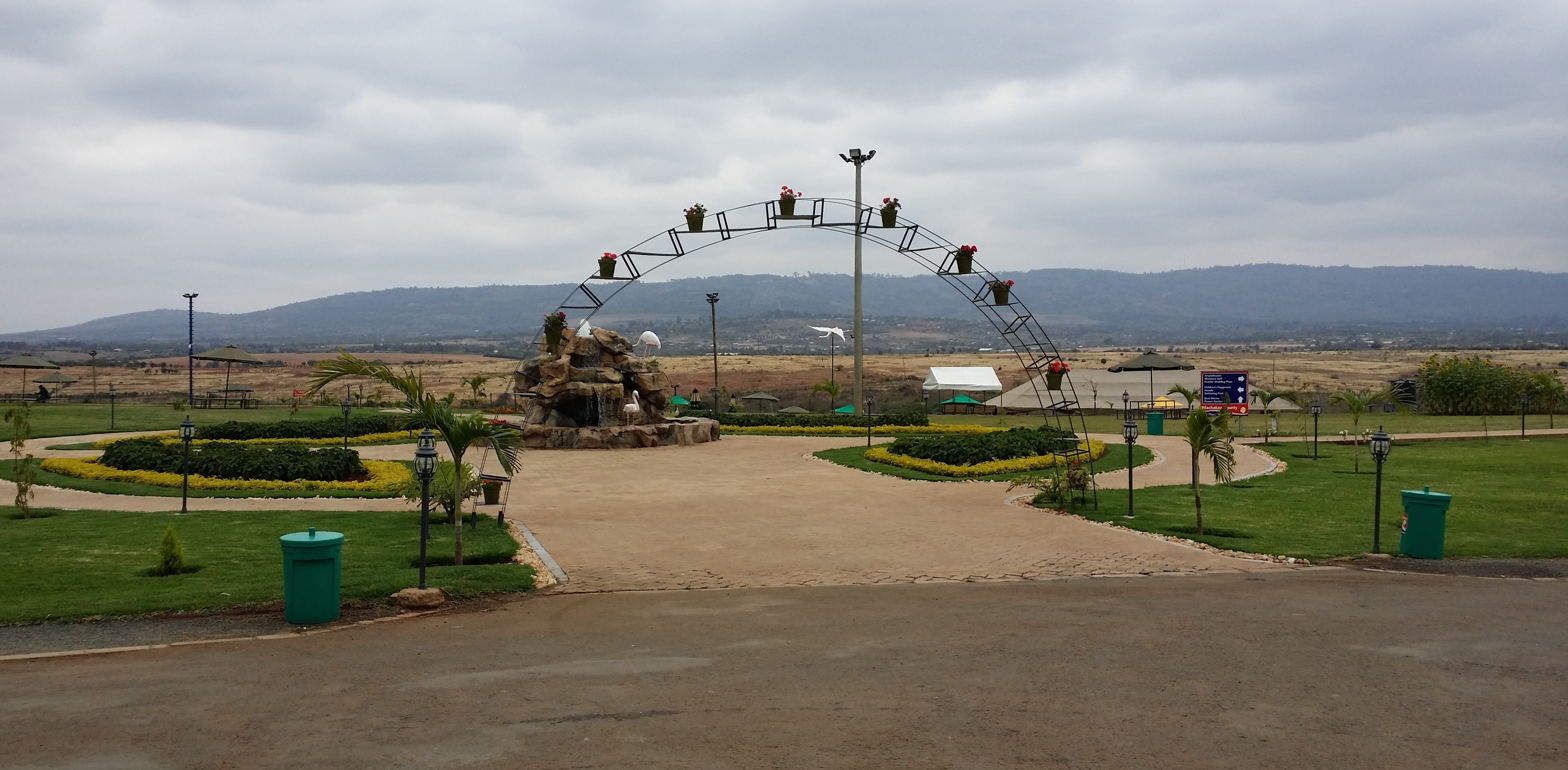
Machakos People's Park

A modern recreation park. It is situated adjacent to Maruba dam, which is the main source of water to Machakos Town.

== Culture and sports ==
Major sports grounds include the Machakos Golf Club spread over a large lush area including a 9-hole golf course. There is also Kenyatta Stadium which is adjacent to the Machakos Social Hall and is the home ground of Sofapaka FC. It is a busy stadium, being used in many of Kenya Premier League (KPL)'s schedules and domestic matches. Renovated to modern standards, the stadium is set to be renamed Kalonzo Musyoka Stadium.

== Religion ==
More than two thirds of people in Machakos town are Christians. The main churches are Our Lady of Lourdes cathedral and All Souls cathedral for Catholics and Anglicans respectively. Aic Boman is also are another significant church in the town. There is also a Muslim mosque and a Hindu Temple.

== Education ==
Primary schools in Machakos include Machakos Primary, St. Mary's Boys and Girls, Muthini Primary, Township Muslim Primary School, St. Teresas Primary, Machakos Academy, ABC Girls Academy, One Hill Academy Premese Academy, Lukenya Academy, Makutano Academy, Mumbuni Primary, Baptist Primary, Highrise School Mks, and Katoloni.

High schools include Pope Paul VI Junior Seminary (Popase), Machakos Girls, Machakos School, St. Monica, St. Valentine Girls, Mumbuni School, Kitulu day secondary school and Katoloni among others.

Tertiary education is still growing, with new universities and colleges like Machakos University, Machakos Teachers Training College, Machakos Institute of Technology, Copperbelt College, Century Park College, Lukenya University, African Training Centre for Research and Technology, Scott Christian University and Computers for School Kenya. The most advanced and oldest collage remains the Kenya Medical Training College Machakos Campus.

=== The Kyanguli Secondary School Fire ===
On 26 March 2001, a fire was set at Kyanguli Secondary School after the final exam. Results were annulled and payment of their outstanding school fees was demanded ^{(by whom?)}. 67 people perished and another 19 were injured, including one of the perpetrators. The two perpetrators, Felix Mambo Ngumbao, 16, and Davies Otieno Onyango, 17, were charged with murder.
