= Rowland Makati =

Kenyan footballer (born 2001)

Personal information
- Full name: Rowland Makati
- Date of birth: 13 January 2001 (age 25)
- Place of birth: Nairobi, Kenya
- Height: 1.77 m (5 ft 10 in)
- Position: Utility player

Team information
- Current team: Kenya Commercial Bank S.C.
- Number: 27

Youth career
- 2015-19: Escalators
- 2019-20: Vapor Sports

Senior career*
Years	Team	Apps	(Gls)
2020-21	Nairobi City Stars	0	(0)
2020-21	→ Nairobi Stima (loan)	17	(5)
2021-2025	Nairobi City Stars	43	(2)
2025-	KCB	9	(0)
- * Club domestic league appearances and goals as of 9 Jan 2026

Rowland Babu Makati (born 13 January 2001) is a Kenyan football player who turns out for Kenyan Premier League club Kenya Commercial Bank S.C.

== Career ==
Makati turned out for Kawangware-based side Escalators before joining third-tier side Vapor Sports for the 2019–20 season.

He was signed up by Nairobi City Stars in August 2020 on a long-term deal after being scouted during the Nairobi regional Chapa Dimba na Safaricom finals held at Jamhuri High School.

In the 2020–21 season, he was sent on loan to second-tier side Nairobi Stima to gain work experience. He returned to his parent club City Stars for the 2021-22 FKF Premier League season.

After a long wait, he was handed his topflight debut on Mon 6 June 2022 by head coach Nicholas Muyoti after being introduced in the second half during a 33rd round 2021-22 FKF Premier League game against AFC Leopards at Thika Stadium.

Prior to the start of the 2022-23 FKF Premier League season, Makati converted from an attacking midfielder to a right-back to fill a void left after the exit of Kevin Otieno.

He scored his maiden premier league goal on Sunday 24 September 2023 against Nzoia Sugar in Ruaraka, and added his second on 7 Dec 2025 in Machakos.

In August 2025 Makati ended his five-year stay at City Stars to join Kenya Commercial Bank S.C. on a two-year deal as part of a major squad rebuild under new coach Robert Matano.
