= F.C. Talanta =

Kenyan association football club

FC Talanta
- FC Talanta Logo
- Full name: Football Club Talanta
- Founded: 19 July 2012; 14 years ago
- Ground: Ruaraka Stadium; Nairobi, Kenya
- Capacity: 4,000
- Executive Director: James Theuri
- Head Coach: Jackson Gatheru
- League: National Super League
- 2025–2026: 8th
- Website: http://www.fctalanta.co.ke
Home colours	Away colours

Football Club Talanta, also known as FC Talanta, is a Kenyan professional football club based in Nairobi, incorporated in July 2012. They currently compete in the Kenyan National Super League, second division of the Kenyan football league system.

== History ==
=== Early days and formation ===
The talent development pilot programme was initiated in Guinea, Côte d'Ivoire, Niger and Kenya. In Kenya, the first phase was started in 2010 at the Kasarani Stadium and was launched by the then Minister of Sports and Youth Affairs Hellen Sambili. Since then, they have moved to their current location in Karen and, in conjunction with UNICEF, the Ministry of Youth Affairs and Sports is working hard to get the team a permanent home ground. Talanta team members were chosen from the Safaricom Sakata tournament and were graduates of the academy.

=== 2012 FKF President's Cup ===
The Football Kenya Federation (FKF) confirmed on 26 July 2012 that 32 teams registered for the 2012 FKF President's Cup after paying the mandatory KSh.15,000/= entry fee.

The club's campaign began in the second round, against Tetu Stars. The match, played on 12 August 2012, ended in a 2–0 victory for Talanta, through goals from George Nzenze and Patrick Muchiri. They met FKF Division One side Nzoia United in the third round on 2 September 2012. An own goal from James Ndara and another goal from Hassan Abdulrahman helped the side cause one of the biggest upsets of the tournament at that stage. However, Talanta could not advance from the quarter-finals after suffering a 2–0 defeat to defending Kenyan Premier League champions Tusker, who had beaten Garissa County League side Wamo 13–0 in the previous round. The goals were scored by David Nyanzi and Joseph Emeka.

== Talanta Academy ==
The club's corporate vision is to evolve into a model of successful, transparent and mass movementof Kenyan youth who believe in themselves and can take the country to the nextlevel in soccer. As part of FC Talanta's commitment in giving back to the community, the National Youth Talent Academy (NYTA) was formed.

Talanta has a unique model in Kenya as the players constituting its teams must be graduates or former graduates of NYTA. Every year there is a selection all around Kenya to select the best 25–30 players and integrate them in the current team that will conserve only its best elements. For six months, the players selected during NYTA trials are training and developed in order to fit directly in the first team for the beginning of the following league season.

== Team Image ==
In April 2013, FC Talanta became the first team in Africa to have German-based apparel company Jako as their kit provider. Thus, it is also the only team in Kenya to have a kit supplier.

=== Kit Providers ===
- Jako (2013–2014)

== Corporate structure and sponsorship ==
The Communications Commission of Kenya (CCK) unveiled the sponsorship of the team, which graduated from the National Youth Talent Academy. The team's launch was held on 19 July 2012 at the Safari Park Hotel. CCK agreed a KSh.51 million/= deal to sponsor Talanta for the next three years.

=== Social responsibility ===
The sponsorship of FC Talanta is one of the many CSR efforts undertaken by the CCK in youth empowerment geared towards the creation of livelihoods among the youth.
