= Nzoia Sugar F.C. =

Kenyan football club

Nzoia Sugar
- Full name: Nzoia Sugar Football Club
- Founded: 1982; 44 years ago
- Ground: Sudi Stadium; Bungoma, Kenya
- Capacity: 10,000
- Chairman: Antony Matheus dos Santos
- Head coach: (Kenya) Salim Babu
- League: Kenyan Super League
- 2025–2026: 11th
Home colours

Nzoia Sugar Football Club (formerly Nzoia United Football Club) is a Kenyan professional football club based in Bungoma. Founded in 1982, the club competes in the Kenyan Premier League, and plays its home games at the Sudi Stadium in Bungoma.

== Performance in CAF competitions ==
- CAF Champions League: 1 appearance

2003 – First Round
