= Bidco United F.C. =

Kenyan football club

Bidco United
- Full name: Bidco United Football Club
- Ground: Del Monte Grounds, Thika, Kiambu
- Capacity: 20,000
- Chairman: Thomas Muriuki
- Head coach: Jacob Gichohi
- League: Kenyan Premier League
- 2025–2026: 17th

Bidco United Football Club is an association football club based in Thika, Kenya. The club competes in the Kenyan Premier League, and plays its home games at the Del Monte Grounds and is sponsored by Bidco Africa.
