= 2013 Nairobi City Stars season =

Kenyan football club season

Nairobi City Stars
2013 KPL season
- Owner: Peter Jabuya
- Chairman: Peter Jabuya
- Head coach: Jan Koops
- Stadium: Hope Centre
- Kenyan Premier League: 14th
- GOtv Shield: Round of 16
- Top goalscorer: League: Jimmy Bageya, (4); All: Jimmy Bageya, (4)
- Biggest win: 2-0 vs Muhoroni Youth, 14 Apr 2013, Kenyan Premier League
- Biggest defeat: 4-0 vs KCB FC (A), 23 Feb 2013, Kenyan Premier League

The 2013 was Nairobi City Stars' ninth consecutive season in the Kenyan Premier League. The campaign was marked by significant instability on the technical bench, with the club employing three different coaches over the course of the season in a bid to retain its top-flight status.

Gambian coach Bai Malleh Wadda, who had overseen the final five matches of the 2012 season after replacing Gideon Ochieng, began the 2013 campaign in charge and remained at the helm between January and May through to Matchday 13. Wadda departed and was succeeded by the club's goalkeeper trainer Charles Omondi "Korea", who guided the team between Matchdays 14 and 23 between June and September before handing the reigns to dutchamn Jan Koops for the final phase of the season.

In the final seven league games at season end, Koops managed only one victory, and collected just two points from the final six matches, with a run of three straight losses in the final three games, he succeeded in steering the club clear of the relegation zone, ensuring another season in the Kenyan top flight.

On the field, Ugandan striker Jimmy Bageya, on his return to the club, emerged as the club's leading scorer with four league goals. Bageya was also the team's leading creator, registering seven assists. He was closely followed by club legend Justus Basweti who scored three times and added five assists. Ugandan forward Bruno Sserunkuma scored three goals and added three assists.

At the onset of the season, City Stars roped in some 'big' names notably "Blackberry" Odhiambo from Tanzanian side Azam FC during the January window. But barely two months later he was off and did not see the month of March at the club after signing for Armenian top-tier side Shirak.Former skippers Oscar Mbugua and Dennis Okoth returned to the club after a detour to Gor Mahia and SoNy Sugar, and were joined by the arrival of journeyman Eric Muranda from Posta Rangers.

The season also saw considerable squad turnover. At the beginning of the year, Ibrahim Kitawi, Duncan Owiti, and Francis Akango departed the club.

In the domestic Cup, City Stars exited at the pre quarterfinals after going down 1–0 to Sofapaka at the City Stadium in September.

== Technical Bench ==
| Position | Staff |
|---|---|
| Head coach | (Netherlands) Jan Koops |
| First Assistant coach | (Kenya) |
| Second Assistant coach | (Kenya) Kennedy Odhiambo |
| Goalkeeper coach | (Kenya) Charles Omondi |
| Team manager | (Kenya) Lawrence Njenga |
| Team Physio | (Kenya) |

Source: Standard

=== Squad information ===
Players and squad numbers last updated on 5 June 2026. Appearances include all competitions.
Note: Flags indicate national team as has been defined under FIFA eligibility rules. Players only hold one non-FIFA nationality.

| No. | Player | Nat. | Positions | Signed in | Contract ends | Signed from | Apps. | Goals |
Goalkeepers
| 1 | Ronny Kagunzi | (Kenya) | GK | 2012 | 2013 | (Kenya) Gor Mahia | 12 | 0 |
| 23 | Fredrick Majani | (Kenya) | GK | 2008 | 2013 | (Kenya) Nairobi City Stars | 18 | 0 |
| 30 | Michael Juma | (Kenya) | GK | 2013 | 2014 | (Kenya) FISA Academy (loan) | 0 | 0 |
Defenders
| 3 | Nicholas Ochieng | (Kenya) | DF | 2013 | 2013 | (Kenya) | 2 | 0 |
| 5 | John Amboko | (Kenya) | CB | 2012 | 2013 | Contract Renewal | 30 | 0 |
| 8 | Calvin Masawa | (Kenya) | LB / RB | 2011 | 2013 | (Kenya) Migori Youth | 7 | 0 |
| 12 | Dennis Ng'ang'a | (Kenya) | LB | 2013 | 2013 | (Kenya) | 20 | 0 |
| 15 | Nicholas Meja | (Kenya) | RB | 2011 | 2013 | (Kenya) | 2 | 0 |
| 16 | Joel Ssebuliba | (Uganda) | DF | 2013 | 2013 | (Uganda) | 25 | 2 |
| 18 | Arthur Museve | (Kenya) | CB | 2008 | 2013 | (Kenya) Securicor FC | 23 | 1 |
| 29 | Andrew Ongwae | (Kenya) | DF | 2012 | 2013 | (Kenya) Congo United | 11 | 0 |
Midfielders
| 4 | Dennis Okoth | (Kenya) | CM | 2013 | 2013 | (Kenya) SoNy Sugar | 27 | 1 |
| 7 | Francis Thairu | (Kenya) | AM | 2008 | 2013 | (Kenya) World Hope | 18 | 1 |
| 11 | Kenneth Tumusiime | (Uganda) | MF | 2013 | 2013 | (Uganda) | 4 | 0 |
| 12 | Herbert Kunga | (Kenya) | DF | 2013 | 2013 | (Kenya) Ligi Ndogo | 9 | 0 |
| 13 | Victor Okullu | (Kenya) | DM | 2011 | 2013 | (Kenya) Vapor Sports | 4 | 0 |
| 17 | Boniface Onyango | (Kenya) | DM | 2012 | 2013 | (Kenya) Congo United | 24 | 2 |
| 21 | Victor Ashinga | (Kenya) | MF | 2011 | 2013 | (Kenya) Red Berets | 7 | 0 |
| 24 | Simon Ogutu | (Kenya) | MF | 2010 | 2013 | Contract renewal | 17 | 0 |
Forwards
| 2 | Dennis Okumu | (Kenya) | ST | 2012 | 2013 | (Kenya) Congo United | 2 | 0 |
| 6 | John Makwatta | (Kenya) | ST | 2011 | 2013 | (Kenya) JMJ Academy | 14 | 3 |
| 9 | Justus Basweti | (Kenya) | ST | 2008 | 2013 | (Kenya) World Hope | 30 | 3 |
| 10 | Silas Aluvisioa | (Kenya) | FW | 2012 | 2013 | (Kenya) AFC Leopards | 19 | 1 |
| 11 | Sammy Bavon | (Kenya) | MF | 2013 | 2013 | (Kenya) Kangemi All Stars | 0 | 0 |
| 22 | Bruno Sserunkuma | (Uganda) | ST | 2013 | 2013 | (Uganda) | 18 | 3 |
| 26 | Vincent Otieno | (Kenya) | ST | 2013 | 2014 | (Kenya) Ligi Ndogo | 0 | 0 |
| 26 | Raymond Omondi | (Kenya) | ST | 2013 | 2014 | (Kenya) Kibera Celtic | 5 | 0 |
| 27 | George Mwangi | (Kenya) | ST | 2012 | 2013 | Contract renewal | 17 | 2 |
| 28 | Eric Muranda | (Kenya) | ST | 2013 | 2013 | (Kenya) Posta Rangers | 15 | 2 |
| 40 | Jimmy Bageya | (Uganda) | FW | 2013 | 2013 | (Kenya) AFC Leopards | 27 | 4 |
Players who left the club
| No. | Player | Nat. | Positions | Signed in | Contract ends | Signed to | Apps. | Goals |
| 19 | Peter Ashango | (Kenya) | LB | 2009 | 2013 | (Kenya) Chemelil Sugar | 4 | 0 |
| 30 | Simon Lusaka | (Kenya) | GK | 2013 | 2013 | (Kenya) | 0 | 0 |

Source: GSA

== Off season transfers ==
=== In ===
| Date | Pos. | Player | From | Ref. |
|---|---|---|---|---|
| 23 Feb 2013 | DF | (Uganda) Joel Ssebuliba | (Uganda) | |
| 23 Feb 2013 | MF | (Uganda) Kenneth Tumusiime | (Uganda) | |
| 23 Feb 2013 | ST | (Uganda) Jimmy Bageya | (Kenya) AFC Leopards | |
| 23 Feb 2013 | MF | (Kenya) Dennis Okoth | (Kenya) SoNy Sugar | |
| 23 Feb 2013 | AM | (Kenya) Oscar Mbugua | (Kenya) Gor Mahia | |
| 23 Feb 2013 | FW | (Kenya) George Odhiambo | (Tanzania) Azam FC | |
| 23 Feb 2013 | FW | (Kenya) Eric Muranda | (Kenya) Posta Rangers | |
| 23 Feb 2013 | GK | (Kenya) Simon Lusaka | (Kenya) AFC Leopards | |
| 23 Feb 2013 | ST | (Kenya) Vincent Okoth | (Kenya) Ligi Ndogo | |
| 23 Feb 2013 | MF | (Kenya) Herbert Kunga | (Kenya) Ligi Ndogo | |

=== Out ===
| Date | Pos. | Player | To | Ref. |
|---|---|---|---|---|
| 1 Feb 2013 | DF | (Kenya) Francis Akango | (Kenya) Mathare United | |
| 1 Feb 2013 | ST | (Kenya) Duncan Owiti | (Kenya) Mahakama | |
| 1 Feb 2013 | GK | (Kenya) Peter Odhiambo | | |
| 1 Feb 2013 | ST | (Kenya) Alex Nyamweno | (Kenya) MOYAS | |
| 1 Feb 2013 | AM | (Kenya) Ibrahim Kitawi | (Kenya) FISA Academy | |
| 1 Feb 2013 | DF | (Kenya) David King'atua | (Kenya) Thika United | |

=== In ===
| Date | Pos. | Player | From | Ref. |
|---|---|---|---|---|
| 30 Jun 2013 | GK | (Kenya) Michael Juma | (Kenya) FISA Academy | |
| 30 Jun 2013 | ST | (Kenya) Raymond Omondi | (Kenya) Kibera Celtic | |
| 30 Jun 2013 | ST | (Kenya) Sammy Bavon | (Kenya) Kangemi AllStars | |

=== Out ===
| Date | Pos. | Player | To | Ref. |
|---|---|---|---|---|
| 28 Feb 2013 | FW | (Kenya) George Odhiambo | (Armenia) Shirak Gyumri | |
| 30 Jun 2013 | MF | (Kenya) Peter Ashango | (Kenya) Chemelil Sugar | |

== Competitions ==
=== Overall record ===
| Competition | First match | Last match | Starting round | Final position | Record | | | | | | | |
| Competition | First match | Last match | Starting round | Final position | Pld | W | D | L | GF | GA | GD | Win % |
|---|---|---|---|---|---|---|---|---|---|---|---|---|
| 2013 KPL | 24 Feb 2013 | 9 Nov 2013 | Matchday 1 | 14th | 30 | 7 | 11 | 12 | 24 | 36 | −12 | 23.33 |
| 2013 GOtv Shield | 25 Aug 2013 | 22 Sep 2013 | Round of 64 | Round of 16 | 2 | 1 | 0 | 1 | 1 | 1 | +0 | 50.00 |
| Total | | | | | 32 | 8 | 11 | 13 | 25 | 37 | −12 | 25.00 |

Source: rsssf

=== Premier League ===
==== Results summary ====
| Overall | | | | | | | | Home | | | | | | Away | | | | | |
| Pld | W | D | L | GF | GA | GD | Pts | W | D | L | GF | GA | GD | W | D | L | GF | GA | GD |
|---|---|---|---|---|---|---|---|---|---|---|---|---|---|---|---|---|---|---|---|
| 30 | 7 | 11 | 12 | 24 | 36 | −12 | 32 | 4 | 3 | 8 | 10 | 16 | −6 | 3 | 8 | 4 | 14 | 20 | −6 |

Source: Soccerway

==== Results by round ====
| Round | 1 | 2 | 3 | 4 | 5 | 6 | 7 | 8 | 9 | 10 | 11 | 12 | 13 | 14 | 15 | 16 | 17 | 18 | 19 | 20 | 21 | 22 | 23 | 24 | 25 | 26 | 27 | 28 | 29 | 30 |
|---|---|---|---|---|---|---|---|---|---|---|---|---|---|---|---|---|---|---|---|---|---|---|---|---|---|---|---|---|---|---|
| Ground | A | H | A | A | H | H | H | A | H | H | A | A | H | A | H | A | A | H | H | H | A | A | H | A | A | H | H | A | H | A |
| Result | L | L | D | W | L | W | W | L | L | W | D | D | W | D | W | D | D | L | D | D | D | L | L | W | D | L | D | L | L | L |
| Position | 16 | 16 | 16 | 11 | 11 | 10 | 10 | 9 | 12 | 9 | 8 | 8 | 8 | 9 | 7 | 7 | 7 | 10 | 10 | 10 | 10 | 10 | 11 | 10 | 10 | 10 | 10 | 10 | 13 | 14 |
| Points | 0 | 0 | 1 | 4 | 4 | 7 | 10 | 10 | 10 | 13 | 14 | 15 | 18 | 19 | 22 | 23 | 24 | 24 | 25 | 26 | 27 | 27 | 27 | 30 | 31 | 31 | 32 | 32 | 32 | 32 |

Source: Soccerway
A = Away; H = Home; W = Win; D = Draw; L = Loss; P = Postponed

==== Score overview ====
Win Draw Loss

| Opposition | Home score | Away score | Aggregate score | Double |
|---|---|---|---|---|
| AFC Leopards | 2-1 | 1-1 | 3-1 | No |
| Bandari | 1-1 | 2-2 | 3-3 | No |
| Chemelil Sugar | 1-2 | 0–1 | 1-3 | No |
| Gor Mahia | 0-0 | 0-0 | 0-0 | No |
| Kakamega Homeboyz | 1-0 | 0-0 | 1-0 | No |
| Karuturi Sports | 1-2 | 2-1 | 3-3 | No |
| KCB | 0–2 | 0–4 | 0-6 | No |
| Mathare United | 1-0 | 2-2 | 3-2 | No |
| Muhoroni Youth | 0-1 | 2-0 | 2-1 | No |
| Sofapaka | 1-3 | 0-3 | 1-6 | No |
| SoNy Sugar | 2-1 | 0-0 | 2-1 | No |
| Thika United | 0-1 | 0-2 | 0-3 | No |
| Tusker | 0-1 | 3-2 | 3-3 | No |
| Ulinzi Stars | 0-1 | 0-0 | 0-1 | No |
| Western Stima | 0-0 | 2-2 | 2-2 | No |

Source: Soccerway

==== Matches ====
Win Draw Loss Fixtures

The league officially kicked off on the 24 February 2013, eight days from the original dates

| 24 February 2013 2 | KCB FC | 4-0 | Nairobi City Stars | Nairobi |
| 15:00 UTC+3 | Alwanga 20', 34'; Awuor 24' (pen.); Keli 30' | Report | | Stadium: City Stadium; Referee: Moses Osano |

| 1 March 2013 3 | Nairobi City Stars | 0-1 | Thika United | Nairobi |
| 15:00 UTC+3 | | Report | Kahata 90+2' | Stadium: Hope Centre; Referee: Raphael Nduati |

| 10 March 2013 4 | Bandari | 2-2 | Nairobi City Stars | Mombasa |
| 15:00 UTC+3 | Buki (?); Tevelu (?) | Report | Muranda 20' (pen.); Bageya 75' | Stadium: Mombasa Stadium |

| 17 March 2013 5 | Karuturi Sports | 1-2 | Nairobi City Stars | Naivasha |
| 15:00 UTC+3 | Musieba 69' | Report | Onyango 8'; Aluvisia 56' | Stadium: Karuturi Sports Club; Referee: Amos Wanjala Ref |

| 23 March 2013 1 | Nairobi City Stars | 1-2 | Chemelil Sugar | Nairobi |
| 15:00 UTC+3 | Sserunkuma 22' | Report | Likono 42'; Omondi 80' | Stadium: Hope centre Referee: Davies Omweno |

| 30 March 2013 6 | Nairobi City Stars | 2-1 | SoNy Sugar | Nairobi |
| 15:00 UTC+3 | Okoth 22'; Bageya 71' | Report | Odete 34' | Stadium: Hope centre Referee: Sylvester Kirwa |

| 14 April 2013 7 | Muhoroni Youth | 0-2 | Nairobi City Stars | Muhoroni |
| 15:00 UTC+3 | | Report | Basweti 42'; Mwangi 90' | Stadium: Muhoroni Stadium; Referee: Raphael Nduati |

| 20 April 2013 8 | Nairobi City Stars | 1-3 | Sofapaka | Nairobi |
| 15:00 UTC+3 | Bageya 60' (pen.) | Report | Mulumba (?); Agwanda 80'; Baraza 89' | Stadium: City Stadium; Referee: James Kagera |

| 1 May 2013 9 | Nairobi City Stars | 0-1 | Tusker | Nairobi |
| 15:00 UTC+3 | | Report | Shikokoti 70' | Stadium: City Stadium; Referee: Isaac Ochieng |

| 5 May 2013 10 | Nairobi City Stars | 2-1 | AFC Leopards | Nairobi |
| 15:00 UTC+3 | Sebuliba 42'; Mwangi 45' | Report | Nahimana 8' | Stadium: City Stadium; Referee: Richard Obare |

| 11 May 2013 11 | Western Stima | 2-2 | Nairobi City Stars | Kakamega |
| 15:00 UTC+3 | Ochola 7'; Omuse 74' | Report | Muranda 55'; Onyango 63' | Stadium: Bukhungu Stadium; Referee: George Mwai |

| 18 May 2013 12 | Gor Mahia | 0-0 | Nairobi City Stars | Nairobi |
| 15:00 UTC+3 | | Report | | Stadium: City Stadium; Referee: Fidelis Wekesa |

| 25 May 2013 13 | Nairobi City Stars | 1-0 | Kakamega Homeboyz | Nairobi |
| 15:00 UTC+3 | Basweti 25' | Report | | Stadium: Hope Centre; Referee: Davies Omweno |

| 22 June 2013 14 | Ulinzi Stars | 0-0 | Nairobi City Stars | Nakuru |
| 15:00 UTC+3 | | Report | | Stadium: Afraha Stadium; Referee: Nasur Doka |

| 29 June 2013 15 | Nairobi City Stars | 1-0 | Mathare United | Nairobi |
| 15:00 UTC+3 | | Report | Basweti 52' | Stadium: Hope centre Referee: Tabitha Njoroge |

| 6 July 2013 16 | Mathare United | 2-2 | Nairobi City Stars | Nairobi |
| 15:00 UTC+3 | Okello 31'; Ouma 87' | Report | Bageya 10'; Ssebuliba 75' | Stadium: Nyayo Stadium; Referee: Sylvester Kirwa |

| 20 July 2013 17 | Nairobi City Stars | 0-1 | Ulinzi Stars | Nairobi |
| 15:00 UTC+3 | | Report | Serenge 82' | Stadium: Hope Centre; Referee: Raphael Nduati |

| 27 July 2013 18 | Kakamega Homeboyz | 0-0 | Nairobi City Stars | Kakamega |
| 15:00 UTC+3 | | Report | | Stadium: Bukhungu Stadium; Referee: Amos Wanjala Ref |

| 4 August 2013 19 | Nairobi City Stars | 0-0 | Gor Mahia | Nairobi |
| 15:00 UTC+3 | | Report | | Stadium: Nyayo Stadium; Referee: Amos Ichingwa |

| 11 August 2013 20 | Nairobi City Stars | 0-0 | Western Stima | Nairobi |
| 15:00 UTC+3 | | Report | | Stadium: Nyayo Stadium; Referee: Amos Wanjala Ref |

| 18 August 2013 21 | AFC Leopards | 1-1 | Nairobi City Stars | Nairobi |
| 15:00 UTC+3 | Okwemba 75' | Report | Makwatta 65' | Stadium: Nyayo Stadium; Referee: Isaac Ochieng |

| 30 August 2013 22 | Sofapaka | 3-0 | Nairobi City Stars | Nairobi |
| 15:00 UTC+3 | Situma 9'; Muki 59'; Kasolo 81' | Report | | Stadium: Nyayo Stadium; Referee: Haji Adede |

| 13 September 2013 23 | Nairobi City Stars | 0-2 | KCB | Nairobi |
| 15:00 UTC+3 | | Report | Keli (?); Alwanga (?) | Stadium: Nyayo Stadium; Referee: Sylvester Kirwa |

| 27 September 2013 24 | Tusker | 2-3 | Nairobi City Stars | Nairobi |
| 15:00 UTC+3 | Olunga 8'; Aucho 25' | Report | Sseruma 25', 81'; Makwatta 81' | Stadium: Kasarani Stadium; Referee: Amos Wanjala Ref |

| 5 October 2013 25 | SoNy Sugar | 0-0 | Nairobi City Stars | Awendo |
| 15:00 UTC+3 | | Report | | Stadium: Green Stadium; Referee: Andrew Juma |

| 16 October 2013 26 | Nairobi City Stars | 1-2 | Karuturi Sports | Nairobi |
| 15:00 UTC+3 | Thairu 75' | Report | Mwachiponi 79', 84' | Stadium: Kasarani Stadium; Referee: Tabitha Njoroge |

| 20 October 2013 27 | Nairobi City Stars | 1-1 | Bandari | Nairobi |
| 15:00 UTC+3 | Makwatta 34' | Report | Okello 49' | Stadium: Nyayo Stadium; Referee: Haji Omulisia |

| 27 October 2013 28 | Thika United | 2-0 | Nairobi City Stars | Thika |
| 15:00 UTC+3 | Meja 22'; Odera 53' | Report | | Stadium: Thika Stadium; Referee: Raphael Nduati |

| 3 November 2013 29 | Nairobi City Stars | 0-1 | Muhoroni Youth | Nairobi |
| 15:00 UTC+3 | | Report | Olesu 22' | Stadium: Kasarani Stadium |

| 9 November 2013 30 | Chemelil Sugar | 1-0 | Nairobi City Stars | Chemelil |
| 15:00 UTC+3 | Opondo 90+3' | Report | | Stadium: Chemelil Complex |

=== GOtv Shield ===
Win Draw Loss Fixtures

| 25 Aug 2013 Round of 32 | Nairobi City Stars | 1-0 | Wazito | Nairobi |
| 15:00 UTC+3 | Museve 88' | Report | | Stadium: Hope Centre |

| 22 Sep 2013 Round of 16 | Sofapaka | 1-0 | Nairobi City Stars | Nairobi |
| 15:00 UTC+3 | Situma 89' | Report | | Stadium: City Stadium |

== Statistics ==
=== Goalscorers ===
| No. | Pos. | Player | Premier League | GOtv Shield | Total |
|---|---|---|---|---|---|
| 40 | FW | (Uganda) Jimmy Bageya | 4 | 0 | 4 |
| 6 | ST | (Kenya) John Makwatta | 3 | 0 | 3 |
| 9 | ST | (Kenya) Justus Basweti | 3 | 0 | 3 |
| 22 | ST | (Uganda) Bruno Sserunkuma | 3 | 0 | 3 |
| 16 | DF | (Uganda) Joel Ssebuliba | 2 | 0 | 2 |
| 17 | MF | (Kenya) Boniface Onyango | 2 | 0 | 2 |
| 27 | FW | (Kenya) George Mwangi | 2 | 0 | 2 |
| 28 | ST | (Kenya) Eric Muranda | 2 | 0 | 2 |
| 4 | DM | (Kenya) Dennis Okoth | 1 | 0 | 1 |
| 7 | AM | (Kenya) Francis Thairu | 1 | 0 | 1 |
| 10 | FW | (Kenya) Silas Aluvisia | 1 | 0 | 1 |
| 18 | DF | (Kenya) Arthur Museve | 0 | 1 | 1 |
| Totals | | | 24 | 1 | 25 |

Source: GSA

=== Top Assists ===
| No. | Pos. | Player | Premier League | GOtv Shield | Total |
|---|---|---|---|---|---|
| 40 | FW | (Uganda) Jimmy Bageya | 7 | 0 | 7 |
| 9 | ST | (Kenya) Justus Basweti | 5 | 0 | 5 |
| 22 | ST | (Uganda) Bruno Sserunkuma | 3 | 0 | 3 |
| 10 | FW | (Kenya) Silas Aluvisia | 2 | 0 | 2 |
| 6 | ST | (Kenya) John Makwatta | 1 | 0 | 1 |
| 11 | MF | (Uganda) Kenneth Tumusiime | 1 | 0 | 1 |
| 12 | MF | (Kenya) Herbert Kunga | 1 | 0 | 1 |
| Opponent | | | 1 | - | 1 |
| Missing | | | 3 | 1 | 4 |
| Totals | | | 24 | 1 | 25 |
