= List of Nairobi City Stars F.C. seasons =

This is a list of seasons played by Nairobi City Stars in Kenyan football. The team was founded by Hope International in the year 2003 as World Hope FC, and maintained the name for the first five seasons since formation. In October 2008, the club was bought by Ambassadors in Sport (AIS Kenya), who renamed the club to Nairobi City Stars FC after the 2008 season.The name has lasted to the present day.

In 2003-04, City Stars won the second tier league title unbeaten to earn promotion to the Kenyan Premier League. The team equally won the 2019-20 season to return to the top league after four seasons.This page details details the club's achievements in all competitions per season and the corresponding top scorers.

== Seasons ==
=== Overall ===
- Seasons spent at Level 1 of the Kenyan football league system: 17
- Seasons spent at Level 2 of the football league system: 6
- Seasons spent at Level 3 of the football league system: 0
- Seasons spent at Level 4 of the football league system: 0

=== League records ===
Season	Div	Pos	Record											
Season	Div	Pos	P	W	D	L	F	A	GD	CS	Pts	FKF Cup	Top scorer	Goals
as World Hope F.C.
2003-4 (Note: The team entered the post regular season playoff and won it to earn promotion to the top league)	NSL↑	1st											(Kenya) Francis Thairu	7
2004–05	Prem	8	22	7	7	8	22	23	-1	7	28	QF	(Kenya) Collins Tiego (Kenya) Justus Basweti	5
2005–06	Prem	7	38	14	13	11	43	41	2	16	55	W (Note: Won the domestic cup President's Cup))	(Kenya) Samuel Ouma	13
2006–07	Prem	8	30	11	9	10	31	28	3	11	42		(Kenya) Justus Basweti	6
2008	Prem (Note: Last season as World Hope following takeover by Amassadors in Sport (AIS) in Oct)	7	30	11	7	12	25	31	-6	10	40		(Kenya) Arthur Museve	7
as Nairobi City Stars
2009	Prem (Note: First season as Nairobi City Stars)	6	30	11	10	9	30	29	1	10	43		(Kenya) Arthur Museve	10
2010	Prem	11	30	7	13	10	25	34	-9	8	34		(Kenya) Francis Thairu	5
2011	Prem	14	30	8	7	15	28	35	-7	9	31		(Uganda) Dan Sserunkuma	7
2012	Prem	13	30	6	11	13	16	32	-6	14	29		(Uganda) Dan Sserunkuma	5
2013	Prem	9	30	7	11	12	24	36	-12	9	32	R3	(Uganda) Jimmy Bageya	4
2014	Prem	15	30	4	12	14	18	35	-17	8	24	R3	(Kenya) Dennis Okoth (Uganda) George Abege (Uganda) Lawrence Kasadha	3
2015	Prem	14	30	6	10	14	25	37	-12	7	28	R2	(The Gambia) Ebrimah Sanneh	11
2016	Prem ↓	16 ↓	30	3	10	17	17	39	-22	7	19	R2	(Kenya) Ezekiel Odera	4
2017	NSL	7	36	12	12	12	45	42	3	11	48		(Kenya) Ezekiel Odera	11
2018	NSL	7	36	14	10	12	41	39	2	10	52		(Uganda) Sande Katumba	10
2018-19	NSL	14	38	8	15	15	47	60	-13	3	39		(Kenya) Noah Abich	8
2019-20 (Note: Season interrupted by the novel corona virus. City Stars declared winner by virtue of topping league by the end of the first leg to earn promotion back to the top league)	NSL↑	1st	26	20	4	2	40	18	22	14	64		(The Gambia) Ebrimah Sanneh	8
2020-21	Prem	7	32	12	9	11	34	30	4	11	45	QF	(Kenya) Peter Opiyo	8
2021-22	Prem	5	33	14	10	10	45	34	11	14	52		(Kenya) Ezekiel Odera	10
2022–23	Prem	15	34	8	10	16	37	49	-12	8	34		(Kenya) Kelvin Etemesi	12
2023–24	Prem	6	34	13	11	10	42	39	3	12	50		(Kenya) Vincent Owino	8
2024–25	Prem ↓	18 (Note: Lowest League finish) ↓	34	8	11	15	26	41	-15	7	35		(Kenya) Vincent Owino	5
2025-26	NSL	14	38	9	12	17	31	44	-13	11	39		(Kenya) Joshua Amunike	8

== Key ==
- Prem = Kenyan Premier League
- NSL = Kenyan National Super League
- FKF Cup = FKF President's Cup
- N/A = Not applicable
- Pos = Final position
- P = Matches played
- W = Matches won
- D = Matches drawn
- L = Matches lost
- F = Goals for
- A = Goals against
- GD = Goal Difference
- CS = Clean Sheet
- Pts = Points won

- R1 = Round 1
- R2 = Round 2
- R3 = Round 3
- QF = Quarter-finals
- SF = Semi-finals
- R/U = Runners-up
- W = Winners

Champions	Play-offs	Promoted	Relegated

Note: Bold text indicates a competition won.
Note 2: Where fields are left blank, the club did not participate in a competition that season.
