= 2025–26 Nairobi City Stars season =

Kenyan football club season

Nairobi City Stars
2025-26 NSL season
- Owner: Jonathan Jackson Foundation
- Chairman: Jonathan Jackson
- Head coach: Salim Babu
- Stadium: Hope Centre
- Kenyan National Super League: 14th
- Top goalscorer: League: Joshua Amunike (8); All: Joshua Amunike (8)
- Biggest win: 2-0 vs Mwatate United (A), 22 Nov 2025, vs Equity Bank FC, 22 Dec 2025, NSL
- Biggest defeat: 5-1 vs FC Talanta (H), 7 June 2026, NSL

The 2025–26 season was Nairobi City Stars's 23rd season since the club's establishment in 2003 and its sixth campaign in the second tier of Kenyan football. It marked the club's first season in the Kenyan National Super League following relegation from the Kenyan Premier League at the end of the 2024–25 season, which had brought to an end a five-year stay in Kenya's top flight.

The relegation also resulted in the withdrawal of financial support from the Jonathan Jackson Foundation, leaving the club facing an uncertain future. At one point, Nairobi City Stars' participation in the 20-team National Super League appeared in doubt, with talk of a disbandment of the team in the air, with the club only managing to confirm its place in the competition through the support of friends and well-wishers of the team less than two weeks to the league kickoff.

The demotion triggered a significant squad overhaul, with the majority of the playing staff departing in search of top-flight opportunities. However, defenders Calvin Masawa, Salim Odeka, Stephen Bulugu, Brian Opinde and Timothy Muganda opted to remain at the club, alongside midfielder Abuyeka Kubasu and head coach Salim Babu, who stayed on to spearhead an ambitious premier league return on attempt one.

Babu however exited with his assistant and Scotland trained apprentice Eugene Ochola was handed the task of guiding the team through the final ten games of the season.

Despite the continuity in key areas, City Stars endured a difficult campaign, particularly during the second half of the season. The team struggled for consistency and spent much of the year battling in the lower half of the table. Nevertheless, they secured enough results to preserve their National Super League status, finishing 14th in the final standings with 39 points.

== Off season transfers ==
=== In ===
Date	Pos.	Player	From	Ref.
5 Sept 2025	GK	(Kenya) Maneno Chacha	(Kenya) Nairobi United	
5 Sept 2025	GK	(Kenya) Kelvin Nginai	(Kenya) RAVSA	
5 Sept 2025	FW	(Kenya) Luke Namanda	(Kenya) Tusker	
5 Sept 2025	FW	(Kenya) Lawrence Luvanda	(Kenya) Tusker	
5 Sept 2025	AM	(Kenya) James Kibande	(Kenya) Tusker	
5 Sept 2025	CB	(Kenya) Jimmy Mbugua	(Kenya) Posta Rangers	
5 Sept 2025	RB	(Kenya) Kelvin Elias	(Kenya) Kajiado F.C.	
5 Sept 2025	DM	(Kenya) Austin Moya	(Kenya) Naivas	
5 Sept 2025	AM	(Kenya) Vincent Odongo	(Kenya) Naivas	
5 Sept 2025	RB	(Kenya) Bernard Odundo	(Kenya) Mombasa Stars	
5 Sept 2025	DM	(Kenya) Phabian Odhiambo	(Kenya) FC Talanta	
5 Sept 2025	ST	(Kenya) Edisson Katana	(Kenya) Malindi United	
5 Sept 2025	ST	(Kenya) Joshua Amunike	(Kenya) 3K FC	
5 Sept 2025	AM	(Kenya) Suleiman Konzi	(Kenya) Dimba Patriots	
5 Sept 2025	AM	(Kenya) Abdirahman Shariff	(Kenya) Sharp FC	
5 Sept 2025	CM	(Kenya) Joseph Odhiambo	(Kenya) Bucks FC	
5 Sept 2025	LB	(Kenya) Alvine Mukudi	(Kenya) Police Youth	

=== Out ===
Date	Pos.	Player	To	Ref.
1 July 2025
1 July 2025	ST	(Kenya) Brian Nyambane	(Kenya) FC Talanta	
1 July 2025	GK	(Kenya) Byron Owino	(Kenya) FC Talanta	
1 July 2025	GK	(Kenya) Edwin Mukolwe	(Kenya) Kakamega Homeboyz	
1 July 2025	GK	(Kenya) Elvis Ochoro	(Kenya) KCB	
1 July 2025	AM	(Kenya) Rowland Makati	(Kenya) KCB	
1 July 2025	ST	(Kenya) Kelvin Etemesi	(Kenya) KCB	
1 July 2025	FW	(Kenya) Maxwell Odada	(Kenya) Posta Rangers	
1 July 2025	FW	(Kenya) Elvis Noor	(Kenya) Posta Rangers	
1 July 2025	DM	(Kenya) Kevin Juma	(Kenya) Posta Rangers	
1 July 2025	AM	(Kenya) Joseph Mwangi	(Kenya) Kariobangi Sharks	
1 July 2025	CB	(Kenya) Wycliffe Omondi	(Kenya) Shabana FC	
1 July 2025	FW	(Kenya) Gilbert Abala	(Kenya) Shabana FC	
1 July 2025	CB	(Kenya) Edwin Buliba	(Kenya) APS Bomet	
1 July 2025	DM	(Kenya) Sven Yida	(Kenya) APS Bomet	
1 July 2025	ST	(Kenya) Hansel Ochieng	(Kenya) APS Bomet	
1 July 2025	AM	(Kenya) Vincent Owino	(Kenya) Tusker	
1 July 2025	ST	(Kenya) Dennis Oalo	(Kenya) Tusker	
1 July 2025	FW	(Kenya) Robinson Asenwa	Free agents	
1 July 2025	FW	(Kenya) Benjamin Mosha	Free agents	

=== In ===
Date	Pos.	Player	From	Ref.
1 Jan 2020	GK	(Kenya) Byron Owino	(Kenya) FC Talanta	
1 Jan 2020	FW	(Kenya) Doreck Otieno	(Kenya) Luanda Villa	
1 Jan 2020	FW	(Kenya) Alex Warai	(Kenya) Mathare United (Loan)	
1 Jan 2020	AM	(Kenya) Joseph Mwangi	(Kenya) Kariobangi Sharks	
1 Jan 2020	ST	(Kenya) Titus Kapchanga	(Kenya) 3K FC	
1 Jan 2020	ST	(Kenya) Felix Seda	(Kenya) Nzoia Sugar	
1 Jan 2020	LB	(Kenya) Ezekiel Simiyu	(Kenya) Nzoia Sugar	
1 Jan 2020	AM	(Democratic Republic of the Congo) Dennis Buhendwa	(Kenya) Marafiki FC	

=== Out ===
Date	Pos.	Player	To	Ref.
30 Jan 2026	GK	(Kenya) Maneno Chacha	Kenya Police	
30 Jan 2026	FW	(Kenya) Lawrence Luvanda	(Kenya) Bidco United	
30 Jan 2026	FW	(Kenya) Luke Namanda	Free agents	
30 Jan 2026	AM	(Kenya) Vincent Odongo	Free agents	
30 Jan 2026	CM	(Kenya) Phabian Odhiambo	Free agents	
30 Jan 2026	ST	(Kenya) Edisson Katana	Free agents	
30 Jan 2026	ST	(Kenya) Joshua Amunike	(Kenya) MOFA	
30 Jan 2026	CB	(Kenya) Brian Opinde	(Kenya) Mfalme FC (Loan)	

== Competitions ==
=== Overall record ===
Competition	First match	Last match	Starting round	Final position	Record							
Competition	First match	Last match	Starting round	Final position	Pld	W	D	L	GF	GA	GD	Win %
2025-26 NSL	28 Sep 2025	13 Jun 2026	Matchday 1	14th	38	9	12	17	31	44	−13	23.68
Total					38	9	12	17	31	44	−13	23.68

Source: Flashscore

=== Super League ===
==== Results summary ====
Overall								Home						Away					
Pld	W	D	L	GF	GA	GD	Pts	W	D	L	GF	GA	GD	W	D	L	GF	GA	GD
38	9	12	17	31	44	−13	39	6	6	7	16	21	−5	3	6	10	15	23	−8

Source: Flashscore

==== Results by round ====
Round	1	2	3	4	5	6	7	8	9	10	11	12	13	14	15	16	17	18	19	20	21	22	23	24	25	26	27	28	29	30	31	32	33	34	35	36	37	38
Ground	A	H	A	H	A	H	A	H	A	H	H	A	H	A	H	A	H	A	H	A	H	A	H	A	A	H	H	A	H	A	A	H	A	H	A	H	A	H
Result	L	W	W	L	L	L	D	L	W	D	W	D	W	W	D	D	D	D	D	L	W	D	W	L	L	D	L	L	W	L	L	L	L	D	D	L	L	L
Position	20	9	6	9	9	13	13	14	16	13	14	11	10	8	8	9	10	10	10	10	10	11	10	11	11	12	12	12	12	12	12	12	14	14	14	14	14	14
Points	0	3	6	6	6	6	7	7	10	11	14	15	18	21	22	23	24	25	26	26	29	30	33	33	33	34	34	34	37	37	37	37	37	38	39	39	39	39

Source: Flashscore
A = Away; H = Home; W = Win; D = Draw; L = Loss; P = Postponed

==== Score overview ====
Win Draw Loss

Opposition	Home score	Away score	Aggregate score	Double
3k FC	0-3	1-1	1-4	No
Darajani Gogo	0-3	0-1	0-4	No
Equity Bank	2-0	0-1	2-1	No
Fortune Sacco	3-2	1-1	4-3	No
Gucha Stars	2-0	2-2	4-2	No
Kabati Youth	1-2	1-0	2-2	No
Kibera Black Stars	2-3	1-1	3-4	No
Kisumu All Stars	1-1	0-1	1-2	No
Luanda Villa	1-0	0-1	1-1	No
MCF	0-0	0-0	0-0	No
Migori Youth	0-2	0-1	0-3	No
MOFA	1-1	0-1	1-2	No
Mombasa United	1-0	1-2	2-2	No
Mwatate United	1-0	2-0	3-0	Yes
Naivas	0-0	1-3	1-3	No
Nzoia Sugar	1-1	0-0	1-1	No
Soy United	1-1	1-2	2-3	No
Talanta	0-1	1-5	1-6	No
Vihiga United	2-0	0-1	2-1	No

Source: Flashscore

==== Matches ====
Win Draw Loss Fixtures

The league officially kicked off on the 28 of September 2025

28 September 2025 1	MOFA	1-0	Nairobi City Stars	Homa Bay
15:00 UTC+3	Laban 81' (pen.)	Report	Kubasu (yellow card) 31'; Elias (yellow card) 54'; Bulugu (yellow card) 43' (yellow-red card) 79'; Opinde (yellow card) 88'	Stadium: Homa Bay Stadium

5 October 2025 2	Nairobi City Stars	1-0	Luanda Villa	Ngong
15:00 UTC+3	Amunike 48'; Luvanda (yellow card) 65'; Moya (yellow card) 79'; Katana (yellow card) 90'	Report		Stadium: Ngong Vapor

12 October 2025 3	Kabati Youth	0-1	Nairobi City Stars	Thika
15:00 UTC+3		Report	Amunike 36'; Masawa (TM) (yellow card) 51'	Stadium: Thika Stadium

26 October 2025 4	Nairobi City Stars	2-3	Kibera Black Stars	Ngong
15:00 UTC+3	Elias (yellow card) 25'; Abuyeka 29' (yellow card) 59'; Amunike 71'; Bulugu (yellow card) 81'	Report	Fidel castro 11'; Adeya 53'; Bundi 57'	Stadium: Vapor Grounds

30 October 2025 5	Darajani Gogo	1-0	Nairobi City Stars	Nairobi
15:00 UTC+3	Mundo 20' (pen.)	Report		Stadium: Marist International

4 November 2025 6	Nairobi City Stars	0-1	FC Talanta	Ngong
15:00 UTC+3	Elias (yellow card) 2'	Report	Omondi 82'	Stadium: KIHBT

9 November 2025 7	Fortune FC	1-1	Nairobi City Stars	Kianyaga
15:00 UTC+3		Report	Amunike (yellow card) 48'; Muganda (yellow card) 75' (goal) 90+'	Stadium: Kianyaga Grounds

15 November 2025 8	Nairobi City Stars	0-2	Migori Youth	Ngong
15:00 UTC+3	Mbugua (yellow card) ?'; Odundo (yellow card) 75'; Muganda (yellow card) 88'	Report	Otieno 35' (pen.); Olongi 53'	Stadium: KIBHT

22 November 2025 9	Mwatate United	0-2	Nairobi City Stars	Wundanyi
15:00 UTC+3		Report	Amunike 48'; Shivachi (yellow card) 68'; Mbugua (yellow card) 71'; Masawa (TM) (red card) 74'; Mutiso (Kit Mgr.) (red card) 77'; Luvanda 90+4'	Stadium: Wundanyi Stadium

29 November 2025 10	Nairobi City Stars	1-1	Nzoia Sugar FC	Nairobi
15:00 UTC+3	Abuyeka (yellow card) 60'; Moya (yellow card) 70'; Muganda 75'	Report	Muganda 13' (o.g.)	Stadium: GEMS Cambridge

2 December 2025 11	Nairobi City Stars	1-0	Mombasa United FC	Nairobi
15:00 UTC+3	Moya (yellow card) 41'; Amunike 71'; Elias 88'	Report		Stadium: GEMS Cambridge

7 December 2025 12	MCF	0-0	Nairobi City Stars	Matuu
15:00 UTC+3		Report		Stadium: Ndalani Sports Complex

12 December 2025 13	Nairobi City Stars	2-0	Equity Bank FC	Nairobi
15:00 UTC+3	Mukudi 33'; Moya (yellow card) 37'; Amunike 55' (pen.)	Report		Stadium: GEMS Cambridge

17 December 2025 14	Vihiga United	0-2	Nairobi City Stars	Kisumu
15:00 UTC+3		Report		Stadium: Moi Stadium

21 December 2025 15	Nairobi City Stars	1-1	Soy United	Nairobi
15:00 UTC+3	Katana 68'	Report	Muganda (yellow card) 60'; Shivachi (yellow card) 89'; Ratulo 90+7' (pen.)	Stadium: GEMS Cambridge

10 January 2026 16	Gucha Stars	2-2	Nairobi City Stars	Kisii
15:00 UTC+3	Nyabuto 90+2', 90+4'	Report	Babash 34'; Amunike (yellow card) 42' (goal) 59'	Stadium: Gusii Stadium

18 January 2026 17	Nairobi City Stars	1-1	Kisumu All Stars	Nairobi
15:00 UTC+3	Kibande 77'	Report	Mbaruku 37' (pen.); Ochieng (yellow card) 54'	Stadium: GEMS Cambridge

25 January 2026 18	3K FC	1-1	Nairobi City Stars	Embu
15:00 UTC+3	Mwalimu 66'; Juma (yellow card) 90'	Report	Odundo (yellow card) 20'; Amunike 90+5' (pen.)	Stadium: Embu Stadium

30 January 2026 19	Nairobi City Stars	0-0	Naivas	Nairobi
15:00 UTC+3		Report		Stadium: GEMS Cambridge

15 February 2026 20	Migori Youth	1-0	Nairobi City Stars	Awendo
15:00 UTC+3	Otieno 10'; Ochieng (yellow card) 19'; Isabwa (yellow card) 90+2'	Report		Stadium: Green Stadium

21 February 2026 21	Nairobi City Stars	3-2	Fortune FC	Nairobi
15:00 UTC+3	Seda 7'; Jumba 16'; Bulugu (yellow card) 34'; Mukudi 45+1'; Wekesa (yellow card) 60'	Report	Irungu 20'; Maina 36'	Stadium: GEMS Cambridge

1 March 2026 22	Nzoia Sugar	0-0	Nairobi City Stars	Bungoma
15:00 UTC+3		Report		Stadium: Sudi Stadium

7 March 2026 23	Nairobi City Stars	1-0	Mwatate United	Nairobi
15:00 UTC+3	Kibande 34'; Jumba (yellow card) 60'	Report		Stadium: GEMS Cambridge

14 March 2026 24	Naivas	3-1	Nairobi City Stars	Ngong
15:00 UTC+3	Ouma 13'; Lunalo 65'; Anami 90+5'	Report	Seda 26'; Moya (yellow card) 53'	Stadium: KIBHT

22 March 2026 25	Luanda Villa	1-0	Nairobi City Stars	Luanda
15:00 UTC+3		Report		Stadium: Mumboha Grounds

28 March 2026 26	Nairobi City Stars	1-1	MOFA	Nairobi
15:00 UTC+3	Abuyeka 57'	Report	Nyabuto 60' (pen.)	Stadium: GEMS Cambridge

3 April 2026 27	Nairobi City Stars	0-3	3K FC	Nairobi
15:00 UTC+3	Muganda (yellow card) 12'	Report	Mejja 20'; Juma 39'; Keke 83'	Stadium: GEMS Cambridge

12 April 2026 28	Kisumu All Stars	1-0	Nairobi City Stars	Kisumu
15:00 UTC+3		Report	Kapchanga (yellow card) 37'; Odeka (yellow card) 68' (yellow-red card) 78'	Stadium: Mamboleo Stadium

18 April 2026 29	Nairobi City Stars	2-0	Gucha Stars	Nairobi
15:00 UTC+3	Kapchanga (yellow card) 25'; Buhendwa (yellow card) 27'; Kibande 37', 66'	Report		Stadium: GEMS Cambridge

26 April 2026 30	Soy United	2-1	Nairobi City Stars	Eldoret
15:00 UTC+3	Namasaka 12', 20'	Report	Mwangi 89'	Stadium: Eldoret Showground

3 May 2026 31	Equity Bank	1-0	Nairobi City Stars	Kajiado
15:00 UTC+3		Report		Stadium: Mashuuru Complex

9 May 2026 32	Nairobi City Stars	0-1	Vihiga United	Nairobi
15:00 UTC+3	Muganda (yellow card) 84'	Report		Stadium: GEMS Cambridge

17 May 2026 33	Mombasa United	2-1	Nairobi City Stars	Mombasa
15:00 UTC+3	Toeri 7', 23'	Report	Odeka (yellow card) 20'; Kapchanga (red card) 37'; Jumba (yellow card) 45+5'; Mwangi 45+19'	Stadium: Mbaraki

23 May 2026 34	Nairobi City Stars	0-0	MCF	Nairobi
15:00 UTC+3	Jumba (yellow card) 55'	Report		Stadium: GEMS Cambridge

27 May 2026 35	Kibera Black Stars	1-1	Nairobi City Stars	Nairobi
15:00 UTC+3	Glen 2'	Report	Odundo (yellow card) 28'; Kibande 33'	Stadium: GEMS Cambridge

1 June 2026 36	Nairobi City Stars	1-2	Kabati Youth	Nairobi
15:00 UTC+3	Jumba 49'	Report	Maina 28'; Mac Ferran 71'; Dominic Mac Ferran	Stadium: GEMS Cambridge

7 June 2026 37	FC Talanta	5-1	Nairobi City Stars	Nairobi
15:00 UTC+3	Malo 9'; Maingi 40'; Fuchaka 51'; Kipruto 57'; Nyambane 84'	Report	Abuyeka (yellow card) 5' (goal) 36'	Stadium: Dandora Stadium

13 June 2026 38	Nairobi City Stars	0-3	Darajani Gogo	Nairobi
15:00 UTC+3	Jumba (yellow card) 69'	Report	Tiano 9'; Khubeib 75'; Bala 77'	Stadium: GEMS Cambridge

== Statistics ==
=== Appearances ===
No.	Pos.	Player	Super League	FKF Cup	Total
2	DF	(Kenya) Salim Odeka	14	0	14
3	AM	(Democratic Republic of the Congo) Dennis Buhendwa	11	0	11
4	CB	(Kenya) Timothy Muganda	27	0	27
6	CM	(Kenya) Edwin Jumba	13	0	13
7	AM	(Kenya) Abdirahman Shariff	19	0	19
8	DF	(Kenya) Calvin Masawa	3	0	3
9	FW	(Kenya) Titus Kapchanga	16	0	16
10	ST	(Kenya) Felix Seda	18	0	18
12	FW	(Kenya) Dorreck Otieno	15	0	15
14	AM	(Kenya) Joseph Mwangi	19	0	19
16	CB	(Kenya) Jimmy Mbugua	28	0	28
17	RB	(Kenya) Kelvin Elias	20	0	20
18	AM	(Kenya) James Kibande	24	0	24
19	DM	(Kenya) Austin Moya	31	0	31
20	LB	(Kenya) Alvine Mukudi	32	0	32
22	LB	(Tanzania) Stephen Bulugu	31	0	31
23	GK	(Kenya) Byron Owino	0	0	0
24	FW	(Kenya) Alex Warai	9	0	9
25	RB	(Kenya) Bernard Odundo	26	0	26
28	CM	(Kenya) Joseph Odhiambo	16	0	16
29	LB	(Kenya) Ezekiel Simiyu	14	0	14
30	AM	(Kenya) Suleiman Konzi	18	0	18
31	CM	(Kenya) Abuyeka Kubasu	31	0	31
32	GK	(Kenya) Arnold Shivachi	27	0	27
33	GK	(Kenya) Kelvin Nginai	2	0	2
Players who left the club
3	AM	(Kenya) Vincent Odongo	13	0	13
5	CM	(Kenya) Phabian Odhiambo	8	0	8
6	CB	(Kenya) Brian Opinde	2	0	2
10	FW	(Kenya) Lawrence Luvanda	10	0	10
12	ST	(Kenya) Joshua Amunike	17	0	18
15	ST	(Kenya) Edisson Katana	15	0	15
24	FW	(Kenya) Luke Namanda	12	0	12

Source: KFD

=== Goalscorers ===
No.	Pos.	Player	Super League	FKF Cup	Total
18	FW	(Kenya) James Kibande	5	0	5
31	MF	(Kenya) Abuyeka Kubasu	3	0	3
4	DF	(Kenya) Timothy Muganda	2	0	2
6	CM	(Kenya) Edwin Jumba	2	0	2
14	AM	(Kenya) Joseph Mwangi	2	0	2
20	DF	(Kenya) Alvin Mukudi	2	0	2
10	ST	(Kenya) Felix Seda	2	0	2
30	MF	(Kenya) Suleiman Konzi	1	0	1
Players who left the club
12	ST	(Kenya) Joshua Amunike	8	0	8
7	FW	(Kenya) Lawrence Luvanda	1	0	1
15	ST	(Kenya) Edisson Katana	1	0	1
Awarded goals			2	0	2
Totals			31	0	31

Source: KFD

=== Top Assists ===
No.	Pos.	Player	Super League	FKF Cup	Total
18	MF	(Kenya) James Kibande	5	0	5
10	ST	(Kenya) Felix Seda	2	0	2
14	AM	(Kenya) Joseph Mwangi	2	0	2
20	DF	(Kenya) Alvine Mukudi	2	0	2
31	CM	(Kenya) Abuyeka Kubasu	2	0	2
6	CM	(Kenya) Edwin Jumba	1	0	1
7	AM	(Kenya) Abdirahman Shariff	1	0	1
9	FW	(Kenya) Titus Kapchanga	1	0	1
12	FW	(Kenya) Dorreck Otieno	1	0	1
16	CB	(Kenya) Jimmy Mbugua	1	0	1
19	DM	(Kenya) Austin Moya	1	0	1
22	DF	(Tanzania) Stephen Bulugu	1	0	1
28	CM	(Kenya) Joseph Odhiambo	1	0	1
29	LB	(Kenya) Ezekiel Wekesa	1	0	1
31	FW	(Kenya) Suleiman Konzi	1	0	1
Awarded			2	0	2
Players who left the club
3	AM	(Kenya) Vincent Odongo	3	0	3
12	FW	(Kenya) Joshua Amunike	2	0	2
24	FW	(Kenya) Luke Namanda	1	0	1
Totals			31	0	31

=== Clean sheets ===
Rank	No.	Pos.	Player	Super League	FKF Cup	Total
1	32	GK	(Kenya) Arnold Shivachi	9	0	9
2	23	GK	(Kenya) Byron Owino	0	0	0
3	33	GK	(Kenya) Kelvin Nginai	0	0	0
Players who left the club
1	32	GK	(Kenya) Maneno Chacha	2	0	2
Totals				11	0	11
