= 2016 Kenyan Premier League =

Kenyan Premier League
- Season: 2016
- Champions: Tusker; 6th Premier League title 11th Kenyan title overall
- Relegated: Ushuru; Nairobi City Stars
- Champ. League: Tusker
- Confed. Cup: Ulinzi Stars (cup runners-up)
- Matches played: 240
- Goals scored: 456 (1.9 per match)
- Top goalscorer: (Kenya) John Makwatta (18 goals)
- Biggest home win: Sofapaka 5–0 Nairobi City Stars (7 August 2016)
- Biggest away win: 2 matches: Ushuru 0–4 Bandari (21 May 2016); Ushuru 0–4 Western Stima (3 August 2016)
- Highest scoring: Sofapaka 2–5 Mathare United (27 February 2016)
- All statistics correct as of 19 November 2016.

The 2016 Kenyan Premier League (known as the SportPesa Premier League for sponsorship reasons) was the 13th season of the Kenyan Premier League since it began in 2003, and the 53rd season of top-division football in Kenya since 1963. It began on 13 February and ended on 19 November. Tusker won their eleventh league title, earning a place in the preliminary round of the 2017 CAF Champions League. Ulinzi Stars earned a place in the preliminary round of the 2017 CAF Confederation Cup as runners-up of the 2016 FKF President's Cup, which was also won by Tusker. The two teams will face each other at the 2017 Kenyan Super Cup.

A total of 16 teams competed for the Kenyan Premier League, of which 14 returned from the 2015 season. Posta Rangers and Kakamega Homeboyz were promoted from the second-tier FKF Premier League after spending three and two seasons away from the top flight, respectively.

== Changes from last season ==
Locations of the 2016 Kenyan Premier League teams.
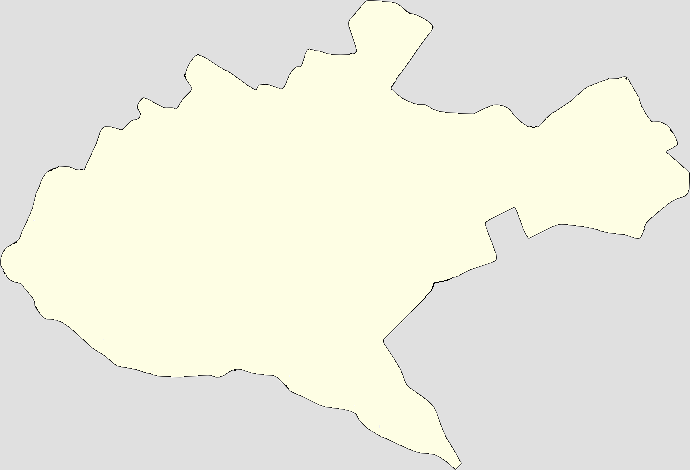
Locations of the 2016 Kenyan Premier League teams within Nairobi.

Relegated from Premier League

- Kenya Commercial Bank
- Nakuru AllStars

Promoted from FKF Premier League

- Kakamega Homeboyz
- Posta Rangers

== Teams ==
Seven of the participating teams are based in the capital, Nairobi, while Bandari is the only team based at the Coast.

=== Stadia and locations ===
Team	Location	Stadium	Capacity
A.F.C. Leopards	Nairobi	Nyayo National Stadium	30,000
Bandari	Mombasa	Mombasa Municipal Stadium	10,000
Chemelil Sugar	Chemelil	Chemelil Sports Complex	5,000
Gor Mahia	Nairobi	Nairobi City Stadium	15,000
Kakamega Homeboyz	Kakamega	Bukhungu Stadium	10,000
Mathare United	Nairobi	Kasarani Stadium	60,000
Muhoroni Youth	Muhoroni	Muhoroni Stadium	5,000
Nairobi City Stars	Nairobi	Hope Centre	5,000
Posta Rangers	Eldoret	Kipchoge Keino Stadium	10,000
Sofapaka	Nairobi	Nyayo National Stadium	30,000
Sony Sugar	Awendo	Green Stadium	5,000
Thika United	Thika	Thika Municipal Stadium	5,000
Tusker	Nairobi	Kasarani Stadium	60,000
Ulinzi Stars	Nakuru	Afraha Stadium	8,200
Ushuru	Nairobi	Public Service Grounds	5,000
Western Stima	Kakamega	Bukhungu Stadium	5,000

== League table ==
Pos	Team	Pld	W	D	L	GF	GA	GD	Pts	Qualification or relegation
1	Tusker (C, Q)	30	17	10	3	40	25	+15	61	Qualification to 2017 CAF Champions League
2	Gor Mahia	30	15	12	3	35	14	+21	54 (Note: On 26 May 2016 (matchday 15), A.F.C. Leopards and Gor Mahia were deducted 3 points each for hooliganism involved in their matches at home against Ulinzi Stars and away at Tusker, respectively.)	
3	Ulinzi Stars (Q)	30	11	13	6	35	25	+10	46 (Note: Ulinzi Stars qualified for the 2017 CAF Confederation Cup as runners-up of the 2016 FKF President's Cup, which was won by league champions Tusker.)	Qualification to 2017 CAF Confederation Cup
4	Posta Rangers	30	10	15	5	22	15	+7	45	
5	Chemelil Sugar	30	12	9	9	24	24	0	45	
6	Western Stima	30	10	14	6	32	24	+8	44	
7	Mathare United	30	11	11	8	33	29	+4	44	
8	Kakamega Homeboyz	30	10	12	8	27	25	+2	42	
9	Sony Sugar	30	10	9	11	23	21	+2	39	
10	Muhoroni Youth	30	10	8	12	26	32	−6	38	
11	Bandari	30	9	10	11	28	31	−3	37	
12	Thika United	30	8	10	12	24	32	−8	34	
13	A.F.C. Leopards	30	8	9	13	32	38	−6	30	
14	Sofapaka	30	7	5	18	34	40	−6	26	
15	Ushuru (R)	30	5	11	14	24	42	−18	26	Relegation to National Super League
16	Nairobi City Stars (R)	30	3	10	17	17	39	−22	19	Relegation to National Super League

Updated to match(es) played on 19 November 2016. Source: Kenyan Premier League
Rules for classification: 1) Points; 2) Goal difference; 3) Number of goals scored
(C) Champions; (Q) Qualified for the phase indicated; (R) Relegated

=== Positions by round ===
The table lists the positions of teams after each week of matches. In order to preserve chronological evolvements, any postponed matches are not included to the round at which they were originally scheduled, but added to the full round they were played immediately afterwards. For example, if a match is scheduled for matchday 13, but then postponed and played between days 16 and 17, it will be added to the standings for day 16.

Team ╲ Round	1	2	3	4	5	6	7	8	9	10	11	12	13	14	15	16	17	18	19	20	21	22	23	24	25	26	27	28	29	30
Tusker	4	9	3	2	4	2	1	1	2	2	2	1	1	1	1	1	1	1	1	1	1	1	1	1	1	1	1	1	1	1
Gor Mahia	10	11	11	12	12	13	6	8	9	8	6	4	3	2	4	3	2	2	2	2	2	2	2	2	2	2	2	2	2	2
Ulinzi Stars	12	3	6	5	5	5	4	5	6	5	4	5	4	3	2	4	4	4	3	3	3	6	6	3	6	6	6	5	5	3
Posta Rangers	2	2	5	4	7	6	7	4	4	4	3	3	5	5	5	5	5	7	7	8	10	9	7	6	7	7	7	8	7	4
Chemelil Sugar	9	14	9	9	10	11	11	13	14	11	11	11	9	11	12	9	8	8	10	9	6	5	4	7	4	3	3	3	3	5
Western Stima	14	7	8	8	9	7	8	9	10	7	7	7	8	7	8	7	6	6	6	5	5	8	5	4	3	4	4	4	4	6
Mathare United	8	5	1	3	1	3	2	2	1	1	1	2	2	4	3	2	3	3	4	4	4	3	3	5	5	5	5	6	6	7
Kakamega Homeboyz	3	8	13	11	8	10	13	10	8	6	9	9	10	9	7	8	9	10	8	7	7	4	8	8	8	8	8	7	8	8
SoNy Sugar	11	13	15	16	16	16	15	15	15	15	14	12	11	12	9	12	13	9	12	12	12	11	12	11	10	9	9	9	10	9
Muhoroni Youth	16	10	4	7	6	8	10	7	7	9	8	8	6	6	6	6	7	5	5	6	8	7	9	9	9	10	10	10	11	10
Bandari	5	1	7	6	3	4	5	6	5	10	10	10	12	10	10	11	12	13	11	10	11	12	11	10	11	11	11	11	9	11
Thika United	13	12	14	14	15	15	14	14	13	14	12	13	14	13	14	14	14	14	14	13	13	13	13	13	13	13	12	12	12	12
A.F.C. Leopards	7	4	2	1	2	1	3	3	3	3	5	6	7	8	11	13	11	12	9	11	9	10	10	12	12	12	13	13	13	13
Sofapaka	1	6	12	13	14	14	16	16	16	16	16	16	16	16	16	16	16	16	16	16	16	15	15	15	16	16	15	15	15	14
Ushuru	15	16	10	10	11	9	12	12	11	12	13	14	13	14	13	10	10	11	13	14	14	14	14	14	14	14	14	14	14	15
Nairobi City Stars	6	15	16	15	13	12	9	11	12	13	15	15	15	15	15	15	15	15	15	15	15	16	16	16	15	15	16	16	16	16

Leader
Relegation to the 2017 Kenyan National Super League

Updated to match(es) played on 19 November 2016. Source: Kenyan Premier League

== Results ==
Home \ Away	AFC	BND	CHM	GOR	KHB	MAU	MHY	NCS	PRN	SOF	SNY	THU	TUS	ULS	UFC	WST
A.F.C. Leopards		1–0	1–1	0–2	2–1	1–1	1–2	0–0	0–0	2–1	1–0	4–0	2–2	0–2 (Note: The match was called off in the 80th minute after A.F.C. Leopards fans protested a penalty awarded to Ulinzi Stars by the referee. The league awarded Ulinzi Stars a 2–0 win and 3 points.)	3–2	0–1
Bandari	2–1		0–1	0–2	2–0	0–1	2–1	1–3	1–1	1–0	1–0	1–1	0–1	1–1	1–1	1–0
Chemelil Sugar	1–0	1–1		0–0	0–1	1–1	1–0	0–0	1–1	2–1	1–0	0–1	0–3	1–0	1–0	0–0
Gor Mahia	0–1	0–0	3–1		1–1	2–1	2–0	2–1	1–1	2–0	1–0	2–1	0–1	1–0	0–0	2–2
Kakamega Homeboyz	4–1	0–0	0–1	0–3		2–1	2–1	1–0	2–1	1–1	0–0	2–1	0–1	0–0	1–1	2–1
Mathare United	1–1	3–1	1–0	0–2	0–0		1–1	0–2	0–0	2–2	1–0	0–2	0–2	1–0	3–1	2–2
Muhoroni Youth	1–0	1–0	1–0	0–2	0–0	0–0		2–0	2–1	1–0	2–2	1–0	1–2	1–1	1–2	0–0
Nairobi City Stars	1–0	2–2	0–1	2–2	1–3	0–1	1–1		0–1	0–1	1–2	0–1	1–2	1–1	0–0	0–1
Posta Rangers	1–1	0–1	0–1	0–0	0–0	0–0	2–0	0–0		1–0	1–1	1–0	1–0	1–0	3–1	1–1
Sofapaka	3–2	0–1	1–2	0–0	1–2	2–5	2–1	5–0	0–1		0–1	5–1	1–1	1–2	3–1	1–2
SoNy Sugar	1–2	1–0	1–0	0–0	1–0	2–1	0–1	2–0	1–2	1–0		1–0	0–1	0–0	0–1	0–0
Thika United	2–1	1–1	1–0	1–2	1–1	0–1	1–2	1–0	0–0	0–0	1–1		1–2	1–1	1–0	0–0
Tusker	1–0	1–1	2–2	1–0	1–0	2–2	2–1	1–1	1–0	1–0	1–1	0–2		0–2	2–2	1–1
Ulinzi Stars	2–2	4–2	2–1	0–0	1–1	0–2	2–1	3–0	0–0	3–1	0–0	1–0	1–2		3–2	1–1
Ushuru	1–1	0–4	1–2	0–0	1–0	0–1	0–0	0–0	0–1	0–2	2–1	1–1	1–1	0–1		0–4
Western Stima	2–1	2–0	1–1	0–1	0–0	1–0	3–0	2–0	0–0	1–0	0–3	1–1	1–2	1–1	1–3	

Updated to match(es) played on 19 November 2016. Source: Kenyan Premier League
Legend: Blue = home team win; Yellow = draw; Red = away team win.

== Top scorers ==
Rank	Player	Club	Goals
1	(Kenya) John Makwatta	Ulinzi Stars	18
2	(Kenya) Kepha Aswani	Leopards	14
3	(Kenya) Wycliffe Ochomo	Muhoroni Youth	12
4	(Rwanda) Jacques Tuyisenge	Gor Mahia	10
5	(Kenya) Whyvonne Isuza	Mathare United	8
6	(Kenya) Fredrick Shimonyo	Western Stima	7
6	(Kenya) Obadiah Ndege	Mathare United	7
8	(Kenya) Amon Asembeka	Sony Sugar	6
8	(Kenya) Michael Khamati	Tusker	6
8	(Kenya) Anthony "Muki" Kimani	Bandari	6
8	(Kenya) David King'atua	Bandari	6
8	(Kenya) Eugene Mukangula	Thika United	6
8	(Kenya) Ekaliana Ndolo	Tusker	6
8	(Kenya) George Odhiambo	Gor Mahia	6
8	(Kenya) Timothy Otieno	Posta Rangers	6

*

=== Hat-tricks ===
Player	For	Against	Score	Date
(Kenya) John Makwatta	Ulinzi Stars	Ushuru	3-2	24 July 2016
