= Moses Magogo Hassim =

Ugandan sports administrator and politician

Moses Magogo
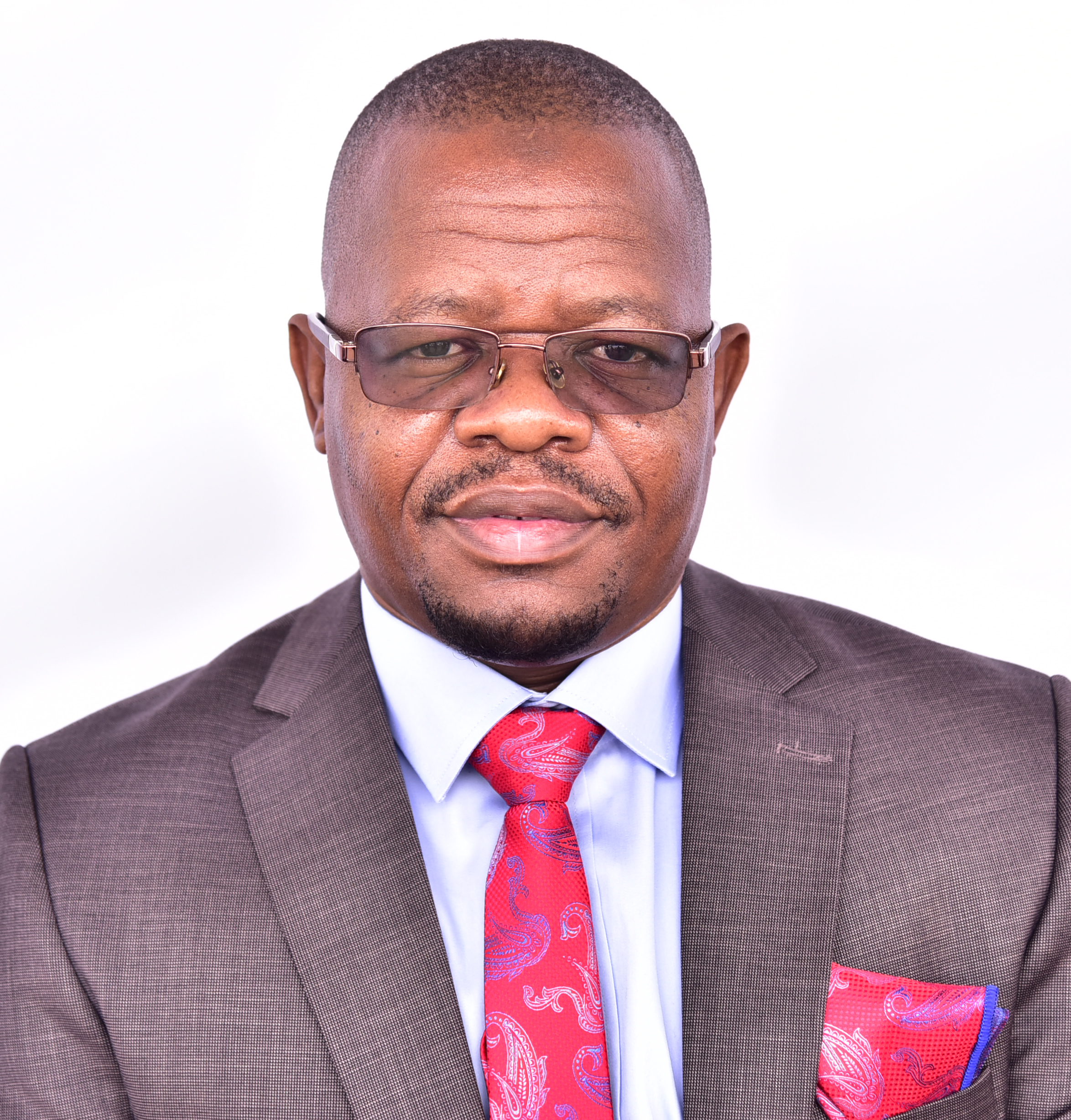
- FUFA President Magogo
- Born: November 8, 1976 (age 49); Buyende District, formerly Kamuli District, Eastern Uganda
- Other name: Magogo Moses Hassim
- Occupations: FUFA President & MP Budiope East Constituency
- Spouse: Anita Annet Among (m. 2022)

Moses Magogo Hassim (born 8 November 1976) is a Ugandan sports administrator and politician. He is the current president of the Federation of Uganda Football Associations (FUFA), and Former Executive member of Confederation of African Football (CAF).

== Early life and education ==
Moses Magogo was born on 8 November 1976 in Buyende District, Eastern Uganda and currently lives in Kampala, Uganda.

Moses Hassim Magogo took the mantle as Federation of Uganda Football Associations president on 31 August 2013 after succeeding Dr. Lawrence Mulindwa. He was re-elected in 2017 for another four-year term.

Moses Magogo went to Kagulu Primary School in Kamuli District, Jinja College in Jinja and Namilyango College in Mukono District before joining Makerere University for a Bachelor of Science degree in Engineering (Electrical).

== Politics ==
In the 2021 general election he was elected to Parliament, representing Budiope East in Buyende District, for the National Resistance Movement. He was declared unopposed in Budiope East MP race and was sworn in on 13 May 2026.

== Criminal Investigations, sanctions and controversies ==
Magogo has faced several investigations and controversies during his tenure as president of the Federation of Uganda Football Associations (FUFA). In 2019, the Inspector General of Government (IGG) opened investigations into allegations related to the handling of tickets for the 2014 FIFA World Cup. The investigations followed directives from Minister of Education and Sports Janet Museveni, who asked the IGG to examine claims that World Cup tickets allocated to Uganda had been sold contrary to established procedures.

In October 2019, FIFA suspended Magogo for two months after he admitted involvement in the resale of World Cup tickets obtained through FIFA channels. According to FIFA, Magogo had accepted responsibility for breaching its code of ethics in relation to the resale of tickets for the 2014 tournament in Brazil.

The IGG later issued summons requiring Magogo to appear before investigators, with reports indicating that he risked arrest for failure to comply with lawful orders. He subsequently appeared before the IGG after repeated notices from investigators.

In December 2023, the United States government announced sanctions against Magogo and his wife Anita Among, the then Speaker of Parliament over alleged involvement in significant corruption and grave human rights violations.

In May 2026, Magogo came under renewed public scrutiny after media reports linked him to security searches connected to corruption-related inquiries. Daily Monitor reported that Magogo remained at FUFA House while security agencies searched properties associated with him and his wife. Spy Reports later stated that Magogo’s residence in Kawuku had been cordoned off by security personnel ahead of a planned search, in connection with inquiries into suspected corruption, illicit enrichment, and related financial matters. The report did not state that Magogo had been charged with any offence.

== Personal life ==
Moses Magogo is married to Anita Annet Among and Dellah Dorah Sally with whom he has children.

== See also ==
- Jackson Mayanja
- Basena Moses
- Abdul-Samadu Musafiri
- Daniel Nkata
