= Patrick Korir =

Kenyan Football Administrator

- Born: 4 June 1973 (age 53); Mukumu, Kenya
- Citizenship: Kenya
- Education: Egerton University; Bachelor of Computer Science
- Occupation: Head of Secretariat
- Years active: 2019
- Known for: New Media, Digital content creator, Punditry, Admin & Ops
- Title: CEO - Nairobi City Stars, HOD - Admin, CHAN 2024/AFCON 2027 Local Organizing Committee (LOC); Assistant Tournament Director - Chapa Dimba

Patrick Korir is the current chief executive officer of Kenyan Premier League side Nairobi City Stars, and immediate former interim chief executive officer at the Football Kenya Federation.

== Career ==
Korir holds a Bachelor of Computer Science degree from the Egerton University but traded IT to become a new media journalist from 2009, and Kenya football pundit and analyst from the year 2012. In 2019 he moved to management after being appointed the CEO of Kenyan topflight side Nairobi City Stars.

Korir also serves as the assistant tournament director for nationwide tournament Chapa Dimba owned and managed by Kenyan Telco Safaricom.

In October 2024 he was hired as the General Secretary/CEO of Football Kenya Federation, albeit on an interim basis, to replace Barry Otieno who tendered his resignation. In December 2024, he was named the deputy CEO of Kenya's multi agency team secretariat named to oversee preparations for 2024 Africa Nations Championship (CHAN), and 2027 African Cup of Nations (AFCON).

In February 2025 he resigned as FKF interim CEO to concentrate on City Stars club duties and his role in the CHAN 2024/AFCON 2027 Local Organizing Committee (LOC) where he serves the secretariat as the HOD-Admin.

== Match manipulation fight ==
Lately, he came out strongly to expose and fight match manipulation in Kenyan football, and making a case for the Kenyan government to enact laws to pin down those behind the vice.
