= Federation of Uganda Football Associations =

Governing body of association football in Uganda

CAF
- Short name: FUFA
- Founded: 1924
- Headquarters: FUFA House, Plot No. 879, Kyadondo Block 8, Mengo Wakaliga Road – P.O. Box 22518, Kampala (UG).
- FIFA affiliation: 1960
- CAF affiliation: 1961
- CECAFA affiliation: 1973
- President: Moses Magogo Hassim
- General Secretary: Edgar Watson Suubi
- Website: https://www.fufa.co.ug

The Federation of Uganda Football Associations (FUFA) is the governing body of football in Uganda. The association was founded in 1924 and became affiliated with FIFA in 1960 and the Confederation of African Football (CAF) in 1961.

FUFA organizes the men's and women's national football teams, and the first and second tiers of national football covering the Uganda Premier League, FUFA Women Super League and the FUFA Big League, FUFA Women Elite League, respectively. The third tier (Regional Leagues) is organized by the regional football associations and the fourth tier (District Leagues / Fourth Division) are administered by the many district football associations. FUFA also organizes tournaments such as the FUFA Super8, the Uganda Women's Cup and the Uganda Cup, which is the oldest football competition of knockout format having started in 1971.

== History ==
In 1924, the Kampala Football Association (KFA) was formed and in the 1950s became the Uganda Football Association (UFA). In 1967 the Uganda Football Association (UFA) was changed to the Federation of Uganda Football Associations (FUFA).

== Uganda Premier League New Format ==
In July this year, FUFA met with clubs to review the last season. During the meeting, they also told the clubs that the FUFA Executive Committee was planning to introduce a new way of playing the League. This new format would start with the 2025/26 season and take effect immediately. On August 20, 2025, FUFA, through its CEO Edgar Watson, sent a letter to the clubs explaining the new changes. These changes included not only the fixtures but also areas like data, player registration, and financial benefits

On Saturday 18 October 2025, FUFA upon engaging with the clubs, sponsors and other stakeholders officially announced that it will change the Uganda Premier League (UPL) back to the normal home-and-away format, abandoning the split system that was introduced earlier this year, which many people found controversial. This decision was mostly welcomed, but it came after a lot of pressure from clubs, fans, and sponsors. One of the top club owners in the UPL, Vipers’ President Dr. Lawrence Mulindwa had promised not to give up his opposition to the league reforms, which included, among other changes, a new format.

== Administration ==
FUFA is an association made up of ordinary 34 members and represented by 86 delegates at the Supreme Body called the FUFA General Assembly (GA). The members include:

(a.) FUFA Special Interest Groups (consists of 8 associations)

- Uganda Beach Soccer Association (UBSA)
- Futsal Association Uganda (FAU)
- Uganda Schools Football Association (USFA)
- Uganda Youth Football Association (UYFA)
- Uganda Women's Football Association (UWFA)
- Uganda Football Coaches Association (UFCA)
- Uganda Football Players' Association (UFPA)
- Uganda Football Referees' Association (UFRA)

(b.) The Licensed 1st division clubs; which are Uganda Premier League Clubs and are usually 16 in number.
(c.) The 2nd Division League, which is Fufa Big League
(d.) The National Women Football Leagues which are FUFA Women Super League (FWSL) and Elite League (FWEL))
(e.) The 8 FUFA Regional Football Associations (RFAs) (see section below)

The organisation is led by the FUFA Executive Committee (EXCOM) which is advised and supported by the FUFA Standing Committees, Judicial Bodies and Secretariat.

== Presidents ==
=== Previous ===
Previous presidents are as follows:

- 1924-34 - King Sir Daudi Chwa
- 1935-44 – W.A. Hunter
- 1945-53 – W.B. Ouseley
- 1954-56 – Eriasafu Nsobya
- 1957-62 – W.W. Kulubya
- 1963-64 – George Magezi
- 1965-68 – A.A.A Nekyon
- 1969-71 – H. Blamaze Lwanga
- 1972-74 – Kezekia Ssegwanga Musisi
- 1974-76 – Era Mugisa
- 1977-79 – Capt. Muhammed Sseruwagi
- 1979-80 – Gerald Sendawula
- 1981 – Steven Ibale
- 1982 – Peter Abe
- 1982-83 – Careb Babihuga
- 1983-85 – Geresom Kagurusi
- 1985 – Chris Rwanika
- 1985-87 – Barnabas Byabazaire
- 1988-89 – Paul Katamba Lujjo
- 1989-92 – J.B. Semanobe
- 1992 – John Ssebaana Kizito (May – December)
- 1994 – Ben Kurt Omoding
- 1994-95 – Brigadier Moses Ali
- 1995-98 – Twaha Kakaire
- 1998-2004 – Denis Obua
- 2004-13 – Lawrence Mulindwa
- 2013–present - Moses Magogo Hassim

=== Current ===
The president of FUFA is Moses Hassim Magogo who succeeded Lawrence Mulindwa in August 2013. Magogo is an electrical engineer by trade and has worked for the African Development Bank. Magogo was previously the federation's vice president, in charge of administration.

In 2000, while playing for Kinyara FC, Magogo started to actively participate in sports talk shows on radio. That platform endeared him to the public and by the time he was elected the FUFA delegate for Lubaga, Magogo had created a niche as one of the most knowledgeable persons about football management. FUFA subsequently appointed him to run the Super League.

Magogo is praised for having transformed the league and football competition systems in Uganda, particularly the FUFA Big League and Regional Leagues. He is also responsible for starting the players contracting regulations and system in Uganda, negotiating and concluding the various sponsorships to football. He has been a central figure in administration wrangles.

== FUFA Regional Associations (RFAs) ==
Eight regional football associations administer the Regional Leagues covering the third tier of Ugandan football. Affiliated members includes Regional League clubs, schools football associations and cup competitions.

- Buganda Region Football Association (4 zones)
- Kampala Region Football Association (1 zone)
- Eastern Region Football Association (2 zones)
- Northern Region Football Association (1 zone)
- West Nile Region Football Association (1 zone)
- Western Region Football Association (1 zone)
- Kitara Region Football Association (2 zones)
- North East Region Football Association (1 zone)

== Zones and district organisations ==
Below the regional football associations, FUFA has divided the country into 13 administrative zones, each of which encompass several district football associations. These local associations are affiliated to FUFA and manage grassroots affairs in their districts including the Fourth Division Leagues.

=== North Eastern region - Zone 1 ===
Sebei, Teso & Karamoja Sub Region

- Amuria District Football Association
- Bukedea District Football Association
- Bukwo District Football Association
- Kaberamaido District Football Association
- Kapchworwa District Football Association
- Katakwi District Football Association
- Kumi District Football Association
- Kweni District Football Association
- Moroto District Football Association
- Napak District Football Association
- Ngora District Football Association
- Serere District Football Association
- Soroti District Football Association

=== Eastern region - Zone 2 ===
Bugisu & Bukedi Sub Region

- Budaka District Football Association
- Busia District Football Association
- Butalejja District Football Association
- Kibuku District Football Association
- Mbale District Football Association
- Sironko District Football Association
- Tororo District Football Association

=== Mid North region – Zone 3 ===
Acholi & Lango Sub Region

- Amuru District Football Association
- Apac District Football Association
- Dokolo District Football Association
- Gulu District Football Association
- Kitgum District Football Association
- Lira District Football Association
- Nwoya District Football Association
- Otuke District Football Association
- Oyam District Football Association
- Pader District Football Association

=== West Nile region - Zone 4 ===
West Nile Sub Region

- Adjumani District Football Association
- Arua District Football Association
- Koboko District Football Association
- Moyo District Football Association
- Nebbi District Football Association
- Yumbe District Football Association

=== Kitara region – Zone 5 ===
Bunyoro Sub Region

- Hoima District Football Association
- Kiryandongo District Football Association
- Masindi District Football Association

=== Western region – Zone 6 ===
Ankole & Kigezi Sub Region

- Bushenyi District Football Association
- Isingiro District Football Association
- Kabale District Football Association
- Kanungu District Football Association
- Kiruhura District Football Association
- Kisoro District Football Association
- Mbarara District Football Association
- Ntungamo District Football Association

=== Buganda region – Zone 7 ===
Southern Buganda Sub Region

- Lwengo District Football Association
- Lyantonde District Football Association
- Masaka District Football Association
- Rakai District Football Association
- Sembabule District Football Association

=== Buganda region – Zone 8 ===
Central and Western Buganda

- Kiboga District Football Association
- Kyankwanzi District Football Association
- Mityana District Football Association
- Mpigi District Football Association
- Mubende District Football Association
- Wakiso District Football Association

=== Kampala region - Zone 9 ===
Kampala

- Kampala Central District Football Association
- Kawempe District Football Association
- Makindye District Football Association
- Nakawa District Football Association
- Rubaga District Football Association

=== Eastern region – Zone 10 ===
Busoga Sub Region

- Bugiri District Football Association
- Buyende District Football Association
- Iganga District Football Association
- Jinja District Football Association
- Kaliro District Football Association
- Kamuli District Football Association
- Mayuge District Football Association
- Namayingo District Football Association
- Namutumba District Football Association

=== Kitara region – Zone 11 ===
Tooro Sub Region

- Bundibugyo District Football Association
- Kabarole District Football Association
- Kamwenge District Football Association
- Kasese District Football Association
- Kyegegwa District Football Association
- Kyenjojo District Football Association

=== Buganda region – Zone 12 ===
Northern Buganda Sub Region

- Luwero District Football Association
- Nakaseke District Football Association

=== Buganda region – Zone 13 ===
Eastern Buganda Sub Region

- Buikwe District Football Association
- Kayunga District Football Association
- Mukono District Football Association

== Current administrators and officials ==
=== Presidency ===
- President - Eng. Moses Magogo Hassim
- First vice president - Justus Mugisha
- Second vice president - vacant
- Third Vice President - Hon. Florence Nakiwala Kiyingi

=== Executive Members ===
- Buganda - Mpiima Samuel
- Eastern - Magoola Issa Kakaire
- Kampala - Dr. Apollo Ahimbisibwe
- Kitara - Rogers Byamukama
- Northern - Obote Dan
- West Nile - Rasoul Ariga
- North East - Mayor Richard Ochom
- Western - Frank Ankunzire
- Women - Agnes Mugena
- Co-opted member - Kalema Ronnie
- Co-opted member - Mulindwa Rogers

Note
The executive committee is composed of 15 members: The FUFA president and his vice presidents and the other 11 members.

=== Committee chairmen ===
- FUFA Competitions committee - Hon. Florence Nakiwala Kiyingi
- FUFA National teams committee - Dr. Apollo Ahimbisibwe
- FUFA Finance Committee - Rasoul Ariga
- FUFA Legal Committee - Ojok Odur Geoffrey
- FUFA Licensing committee - Okello Lee
- Marketing and Communication - Rogers Byamukama
- IMOC - Magoola Issa Kakaire
- Member Associations committee - Mugoye Darius
- Players' Status committee - Emojong Peter
- Referees' standing committee - Nsubuga Brian Miiro
- Security & safety committee - Hajji Abdul Lukooya Ssekabira
- Football Development Committee - Kalema Ronnie
- Women's Football committee - Agnes Mugena
- FUFA electoral Committee - Bwiire Mathias

== Logos ==
Present logo

Former logo (Used in 2024-2025 to commemorate 100 years)
