= Barry Otieno =

Kenyan Football Administrator

Barry Omondi Otieno
- Born: 21 May 1983 (age 43)
- Citizenship: Kenya
- Education: Kenya Institute of Mass Communication; Diploma of Journalism; Moi University; BSc. in Communication and Public Relations
- Occupation: General Secretary
- Years active: 2019
- Known for: Communication, PR, Marketing

Barry Omondi Otieno is a Kenyan football administrator who served as the chief executive officer and head of the secretariat at Football Kenya Federation between 2019 and Oct 2024.

== Early life and education ==
Otieno was born on 21 May 1983 in Nairobi, Kenya. He schooled at Valley Bridge Primary School in Nairobi then Pe Hill High School in Awendo, Migori county. He later acquired a Diploma of Journalism from the Kenya Institute of Mass Communication in 2006. Thereafter, he proceeded to Moi University where he graduated with a Bachelor of Science in Communication and Public Relations in 2013.

He is a trained football coach with basic, advanced, child rights protection, intermediate, Dutch touch youth development coaching, Dutch touch coach of coaches, and KNVB youth development course certificates, all progressively acquired between the year 2005 and 2014 under the auspices of MYSA. He is a qualified MYSA instructor since 2014.

== Coaching career ==
Away from his professional career, Barry is a trained football coach who has handled, among others, Komarock Stars, Timber Wolves, Bistro FC, and Kayole Youth between 2002 and 2010. He was the assistant coach of Mathare Youth U19 team in 2014 as well as the coach of MYSA Talent Academy. He last coached MYSA Kayole Zone from 2015-2016 before joining FKF.

== Professional career ==
Barry previously served in the information and communication departments in Garissa, Nairobi, and Makueni between the years 2007 and 2010. He was the head of the features desk at Kenya News Agency for three years up to 2013 before taking a role as the head of sports in the same organization for another three years. In 2016 he joined Football Kenya Federation as the Communications Officer. In 2018, he scaled up to become the Communications and Marketing Manager, and in July 2019 he took over from Robert Muthomi as the chief executive officer initially on an interim basis.

At the beginning of 2021, Otieno was in the news for wrong reasons after being handed a six-months ban by the Confederation of African Football from all football activities after allegedly tearing apart PCR test copies and reports for COVID-19 for Kenya's national team Harambee Stars during their Africa Cup of Nations qualifier against hosts Comoros in Moroni. The ban came with a financial sanction of $20,000 to the Kenya Football Federation. He was further barred from attending two Harambee Stars matches against Egypt and Togo, and any other CAF-related activities.

Otieno, informed by the disbandment of the Federation by the Kenyan Government on 11 November 2021, and the appointment of a caretaker committee, wrote to the continental body on 20 Jan 2022 informing them in part, "the Federation was unable to independently plan and successfully execute any international matches. . ."

The Court of Arbitration in Sports (CAS), acting on an appeal from the Starlets team members, later ruled in Jun 2022 that Otieno 'acted beyond his authority' in responding to a letter from CAF.
