= Charles Omondi =

Kenyan football manager (born 1968)

Charles Omondi Owuor
Personal information
- Full name: Charles Omondi Owuor
- Date of birth: 5 April 1968 (age 58)
- Place of birth: Pumwani, Kenya
- Position: Goalkeeper

Charles Omondi Korea Owuor (born in Kenya) is a Kenyan former international goalkeeper now serving as the keeper trainer at Kenyan Premier League side KCB.

== Career ==
He joined KCB as keeper trainer in July 2019 from Bidco United. He previously served Gor Mahia F.C., Tusker F.C., Sony Sugar F.C. and Nairobi City Stars in the same capacity.

Omondi briefly held forte as coach at Nairobi City Stars for four months from June 2013 after the departure of Gambian Bai Malleh Wadda.

Omondi was a goalkeeper at Gor Mahia F.C., Kisumu Posta and Kenya.
