= Bakee Mtaani =

Sports-based community program in Nairobi, Kenya

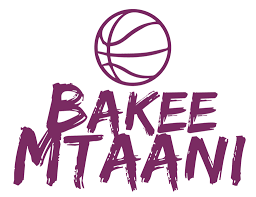
- Formation: 2019; 6 years ago
- Founder: Jonathan Jackson Foundation
- Type: Sports-based community program
- Headquarters: 4th Ngong Avenue, Upper Hill, Nairobi, Kenya
- Website: jonathanjacksonfoundation.org//

Bakee Mtaani (Basketball in the Hood) is a sports-based community program, an initiative of the Jonathan Jackson Foundation that focuses on building basketball courts in Nairobi, Kenya. Two such courts have been constructed at Gatina Primary, and Holy Ghost Mission (HGM) Primary School in Riruta, both in Dagoretti North Constituency, at the BP Riruta Stadium in Dagoretti South, and at the Humama Grounds, in Komoarock, Embakasi South Constituency.

== History ==
Bakee Mtaani uses the game of basketball as a tool to address socio-economic challenges faced by the youth in Nairobi's informal settlements by providing access to courts for fun, team-building, and engagement. Via the program, the courts provide safe spaces for the youth to showcase their talents and to interact, keeping them preoccupied and hence reducing the chances of engaging in social vices such as crime, prostitution, drug & substance abuse.

The first Pilot full-size Basketball Court was constructed and launched in November 2020, at Gatina Primary School in Kawangware, Dagoretti North Constituency. A year later, the second one was launched in the same constituency at the Holy Ghost Mission (HGM) Primary School in Riruta, Kawangware, four months after its groundbreaking.

The third court was constructed and unveiled at the BP Riruta Stadium in Dagoretti South Constituency in January 2022. Construction of the fourth court was announced in May 2022 in Humama Grounds, Komarock, in Kayole, following a partnership with eatery KFC., and unveiled two months later, in July 2023.
