= Lawrence Luvanda =

Kenyan professional footballer

Lawrence Luvanda (Born 16 Nov 1998) is a Kenyan footballer who turns out for Kenyan side Nairobi City Stars as a forward. He formerly featured for A.F.C. Leopards, Vihiga United and Tusker FC in the Kenyan Premier League.
