= Luke Namanda =

Kenyan professional footballer

Luke Wafula Namanda (Born 20 Sep 1993) is a Kenyan footballer who turns out for Kenyan side Nairobi City Stars as a forward after joining from Kenyan Premier League side Tusker.

He formerly featured for Kenyan clubs Timsales, West Kenya FC, Nzoia Sugar, Kakamega Homeboyz, A.F.C. Leopards, and Rwanda's Musanze FC among others.
