= Jenga Jirani =

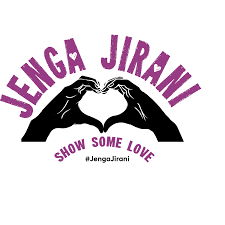
- Formation: 2020; 5 years ago
- Founder: Jonathan Jackson Foundation
- Type: Charity Festival
- Headquarters: 4th Ngong Avenue, Upper Hill, Nairobi, Kenya
- Website: jengajirani.org//

Jenga Jirani is an initiative by the Jonathan Jackson Foundation to mobilize resources to aid vulnerable families in the informal settlements in Nairobi, Kenya.

== History ==
In 2020, Jenga Jirani targeted to raise Kshs 100 million in collaboration with AfricaCentric Entertainment, and a long list of Kenyan celebrity musicians to help the vulnerable in the society affected by the novel COVID-19 coronavirus. It included distributing food, sanitary products, and sharing care.
