= George Odary =

Kenyan footballer (born 1986)

George Lihugu Odary
Personal information
- Full name: George Lihugu Odary
- Date of birth: 28 November 1986 (age 39)
- Height: 1.70 m (5 ft 7 in)
- Position: Striker

Senior career*
Years	Team	Apps	(Gls)
2003-4	KCB		
2005-7	Tusker F.C.		
2008	KCB	16	(2)
2009-2012	Nairobi City Stars	61	(11)

International career
2002	Kenya U17	2	(2)
- * Club domestic league appearances and goals

George Viduka Odary (born November 28, 1986) is a retired Kenyan striker who featured for Kenyan Premier League sides KCB, Nairobi City Stars, Tusker F.C. and Kenya junior sides U17 and U20.

== Club career ==
George turned out for KCB in 2003 and 2004, and returned for the 2008 season after spending two seasons at Tusker F.C. He then moved to Kawangware-based Nairobi City Stars in 2009 where he spent the 2010, 2011 and part of the 2012 seasons. He left halfway through the 2012 season to pursue a non-footballing assignment in Juba, South Sudan.

== International ==
Odary featured for Kenya U17 in 2002 in games against Ghana. He made the provisional kenya national football team team lists in 2005 and 2006.

== Honours ==
=== Club ===
Tusker

- Kenyan Premier League title: (2006/7)
