= Edward Karanja =

Kenyan footballer (born 1974)

Personal information
- Full name: Edward Karanja
- Date of birth: 25 January 1974 (age 52)
- Height: 1.76 m (5 ft 9 in)
- Position: Midfielder

Senior career*
Years	Team	Apps	(Gls)
1994	Kawangware Sports Club		
1995	A.F.C. Leopards		
1996	Tusker F.C.		
1996	Fanja SC		
1997-2002	Tusker F.C.		
2003-2005	World Hope FC		

International career^{‡}
1997-2003	Kenya	13	(1)

Managerial career
- 2011: Kenya U19, Kenya U20, Kenya U23 (assistant)
- 2013: MOSCA (Head Coach)
- 2014: FC Talanta (Head Coach)
- 2016: Banaadir FC (Head Coach)
- 2021-: Liberty Professionals (Head Coach)
- * Club domestic league appearances and goals as of 19:31, 19 Apr 2022 (UTC) ‡ National team caps and goals as of 19:31, 19 Apr 2022 (UTC)

Edward Desh Karanja (born 25 Jan 1974) is a retired Kenyan midfielder who turned out for Kenyan Premier League sides Tusker F.C., World Hope FC and Kenya. He turned to coaching after retirement.

== Early life ==
Edward was born in Kawangware, Nairobi County, and schooled at the Nduraru Primary before joining Rungiri Secondary School.

== Career ==
Edward started out at Kawangware Sports Club before joining A.F.C. Leopards in 1995. He then moved to Kenya Breweries F.C. in 1996 but before he could settle he was off to Oman where he featured for Fanja SC the same year.

He was back at Tusker F.C. in 1997 and featured for the side for seven years till the year 2003 when he moved to newly formed World Hope FC. He left the club after featuring in a few games following the club's promotion to the Kenyan Premier League in 2004.

== Coaching ==
Karanja has been to the National team fold as coach at the U19, U20 and U23 level. He has also coached several teams after his retirement which includes National Youth Talent Academy in 2011, second tier sides MOYAS (MOSCA) and FC Talanta, and lower tier side Boma FC in 2014.

In 2016 he coached Somalia's top tier side Banadir FC. He is the current coach of Kenyan third tier side Liberty Professionals.

== International career ==
Karanja was first capped for Kenya on 21 Apr 1997 by coach Reinhard Fabisch in an international friendly against Iran at Takhti Stadium (Tabriz). His first competitive game was away to DR Congo on 24 Jan 1999 during 2000 African Cup of Nations qualification held at the Stade des Martyrs.

He scored his only international goal in a friendly against Tanzania on 23 March 2003 in a 4-0 win at the Moi International Sports Centre. Karanja was part of the squad that lifted the 2002 Castle Cup at the Uhuru Stadium, Dar es Salaam, and the 2002 CECAFA Cup at the CCM Kirumba Stadium in Mwanza. He earned a total of 13 national caps.

== Career statistics ==
=== International ===
As of 27 April 2022

Kenya
Year	Apps	Goals
1997	1	0
1999	3	0
2002	7	0
2003	2	1
Total	13	1

=== International goals ===
As of 27 April 2022 (scores and results list Kenya's goal tally first)

Goal	Date	Venue	Opponent	Score	Result	Competition
1.	23 March 2003	Moi International Sports Centre, Nairobi, Kenya	Tanzania	4–0	4-0	Friendly

== Honours ==
=== Club ===
Tusker

- Kenyan Premier League: 1999
- Kenyan Premier League: 2000
- Kagame Interclub Cup: 2000
- Kagame Interclub Cup: 2001

World Hope

- KFF Nationwide League: 2003

Kenya

- 2002 CECAFA Cup
- Castle Lager Cup (East Africa): 2002
