= Herbert Kunga =

Kenyan football official

Herbert Kunga is a former Kenyan footballer now serving as the chief executive officer of Kenyan Premier League side Sofapaka and Vice Chair of Wazee Premier League, a leisure league for retired players. He turned out for Ligi Ndogo and Kenyan top-tier side Nairobi City Stars during his playing days.

After retirement from active football, Kunga moved into coaching and youth development as well as sensitization and mentorship. In 2025 he joined the club CEO roster after joining Sofapaka.
