= James Kibande =

Kenyan footballer (born 1996)

Personal information
- Full name: James Kibande Agesa
- Date of birth: 13 September 1997 (age 29)
- Place of birth: Kenya
- Height: 1.80 m (5 ft 11 in)
- Position: Forward

Team information
- Current team: Nzoia Sugar

Senior career*
Years	Team	Apps	(Gls)
2018–2022	Nzoia Sugar		(13)
2022–2023	Kenya Police FC		
2023	Nzoia Sugar FC	14	(0)
2023–2025	Tusker FC		(5)
2025–2026	Nairobi City Stars	24	(5)
2026-	Nzoia Sugar FC	0	(0)
- * Club domestic league appearances and goals as of September 2026

James Kibande Agesa (born 13 September 1997) is a Kenyan professional footballer who plays as a forward for former Kenyan top-tier side Nzoia Sugar.

== Career ==
Kibande started his Kenyan Premier League journey at Nzoia Sugar in 2018 before making a big career move to Kenya Police FC prior to the beginng of the 2022–23 season. But after just six months he was back in Nzoia for the second leg of that season.

At the ened of the 2022–23 season, in August 2023, Kibande returned to Nairobi to join Tusker FC alongside former Nzoia teammate Joseph Mwangi.

Kibande scored his maiden Tusker goal in Machakos on 28 October 2023 in a 1–0 win over Sofapaka FC, and is remembered for scoring a winner against his former side Nzoia Sugar in May 2024 sending them closer to relegation, as his new club strengthened their chances of winning the premier league title.

Kibande spent two seasons at Tusker and left at the end of the 2024–25 season to join relegated Nairobi City Stars in Kenya's second tier, the National Super League (NSL). At the close of that season he returned to Nzoia Sugar for a third stint ahead of the 2026–27 NSL season.
