= Abdul-Samadu Musafiri =

Ugandan football manager

Abdul Samadu Musafiri
Personal information
- Full name: Abdul Samadu Musafiri

Abdul Samadu Musafiri is a Ugandan football manager who was in charge of Kenyan side Nairobi City Stars in 2017, and Ugandan Premier League club MYDA FC in 2021.
