= David King'atua =

Kenyan professional footballer

David King'atua (Born 26 Oct 1992) is a former Kenyan footballer who turned out for Kenyan Premier League sides Thika United, Nairobi City Stars, Bandari, and the Kenya National team as a forward.

== Career ==
His career started at World Hope FC (City Stars) in 2008 through to 2012 before making a move to Thika United for two seasons. He later moved to Bandari from where he had a stint with Swedish side Oskarshamns AIK before later returning to see out his playing career in Bandari.
