= Brian Opinde =

Kenyan footballer

Brian Opinde Onyango (born 11 Nov 2001) is a Kenyan professional footballer who plays as a centreback for Kenyan side Nairobi City Stars. He joined the club ahead of the 2024–25 Kenyan Premier League season from lower-tier side Langas Super Stars FC.

Opinde was scouted while featuring for PASC Langa in Safaricom Chapa Dimba tournament. He earned his Kenyan premier league debut with a cameo appearance against Gor Mahia in Machakos on 28 Oct 2024.
