= Kennedy Odhiambo =

Kenyan footballer

Personal information
- Position: Defender

Senior career*
Years	Team	Apps	(Gls)
2000–2002	Oserian Fastac		
2004–2005	Chemelil Sugar		
2005–2006	World Hope		

International career
2000–2001	Kenya	9	(0)
- * Club domestic league appearances and goals

Kennedy Odhiambo is a Kenyan former international footballer who played as a defender.

== Career ==
Odhiambo played club football for Oserian Fastac, Chemelil Sugar and World Hope.

He earned nine international caps for Kenya between 2000 and 2001.
