= Jan Koops =

Dutch football manager

Personal information
- Date of birth: 22 March 1941 (age 85)

Jan Koops is a retired Dutch football manager who formerly coached Kenyan Premier League sides AFC Leopards and Nairobi City Stars. He also coached lower-tier side Kolongolo FC in Western Kenya.

After retirement from active coaching, he fully settled in Kenya.
