= Jonathan Jackson (Kenyan businessman) =

Jonathan Adrian Jackson is a Kenyan-born real estate developer and the owner of Kenyan Premier League club Nairobi City Stars.

Jonathan acquired City Stars in March 2019 through the Jonathan Jackson Foundation, a community-focused organization, while it was facing relegation. Under their ownership, the team regained promotion to the Kenyan top flight in the year 2020 after five seasons in the lower tier.

Jonathan, who has dual Kenyan and British citizenship, was born in Eldoret, Kenya. He is also a real estate developer with a firm called Lordship Group located in Upper Hill, Nairobi. The JJF, which he founded, uses football as a tool to drive change within communities, focusing on empowering vulnerable individuals and supporting initiatives for sustainable income generation.
