= Collins Tiego =

Kenyan footballer

Personal information
- Full name: Collins Tiego
- Date of birth: 5 November 1983 (age 43)
- Place of birth: Kenya
- Position: Striker

Senior career*
Years	Team	Apps	(Gls)
2005–06	Mathare United		
2006–07	Tusker FC		
2007–08	Rayon Sports		
2008–09	Tusker FC		
2009–10	Mathare United		
2010	Nairobi City Stars		
2010–11	Sofapaka FC		
2011	Posta Rangers FC		
2013–14	KRA	6	(2)
2014–16	Uttar Baridhara SC	15	(4)

International career
2005	Kenya	1	(0)
- * Club domestic league appearances and goals

Collins Tiego is a Kenyan footballer who plays as a striker. He last played for Uttar Baridhara SC. He also represented the Kenya national football team.

== Club career ==
=== Uttara Baridhara ===
On 4 May 2014, he scored a goal against Brothers Union in Bangladesh Premier League, and his team Uttar Baridhara Club won the match by 3–2.
