= Harrison Muranda =

Kenyan footballer (born 1982)

Personal information
- Full name: Harrison Eric Muranda
- Date of birth: 20 January 1982 (age 44)
- Place of birth: Kenya
- Height: 1.85 m (6 ft 1 in)
- Position: Forward

Senior career*
Years	Team	Apps	(Gls)
2002–2003	Mumias Sugar	18	(13)
2003	Al-Bustan		
2004	Saint George		
2005	Tusker		
2005	Victory		
2006	Sporting Afrique		
2007	NS Matrix		
2007	Nam Định		
2008	Hòa Phát Hà Nội	16	(7)
2009	Sông Lam Nghệ An	18	(8)
2010–2011	Fico Tây Ninh	44	(21)
2012	Posta Rangers	8	(3)
2013	Nairobi City Stars	9	(3)
2013	Mohun Bagan	9	(1)
2014–2016	Sidama Coffee S.C.		(4)

International career
- Kenya U-23
- * Club domestic league appearances and goals

Harrison Eric Muranda (born 20 January 1982) is a Kenyan former professional footballer who last played as a forward for Sidama Coffee S.C. in the Ethiopian Premier League. He is currently coaching at Kenyan Premier League side KCB.

== Career ==
=== Early career ===
Muranda started his career with Mumias Sugar F.C. of the Kenyan Premier League in 2002 where he scored 13 goals in 18 games. In 2010, Muranda joined Fico Tây Ninh of the Vietnamese First Division where he scored 21 goals in 44 games. He then played for Posta Rangers F.C. and Nairobi City Stars in the Kenyan Premier League. On 30 August 2013, Muranda signed for Mohun Bagan A.C. of the Indian I-League. He was released from the side on 3 December. He next joined Sidama Coffee S.C.
