= Kenya News Agency =

National news agency in Nairobi, Kenya

The Kenya News Agency (KNA) is a government-run national news agency created in 1963. Its headquarter is in Nairobi and it is run by the Department of Information, Ministry of Information Communication and Technology. News reports are created by KNA reporters in 72 county and sub-county offices and disseminated from the National Editorial Desk (Press Office) in Nairobi to subscribers made up of news media companies in Kenya and around the world. Their services also include Electronic/TV News Unit, Mobile Cinema and Photographic Services.

== Pre-Independence ==
The work of the Kenya News Agency as a national news gathering operation began decades earlier with the Kenya Information Service (KIS) formed in 1939 to disseminate information on World War II. In 1945, after the war, the service changed its name to the African Information Service (AIS) and it served as an information unit mainly for the white settlers of the colonial British government.

Between 1953 and 1954 the African Information Services became the Department of Information with the appointment of the first Director of Information and the first press officers. The new Department consisted of several sections – Administrative, African, Press, Films and Photographs, Provincial Organizations and Information and Reference. It was administered from the Office of the Chief Secretary, at the time Richard Turnbull. The Department of Information served mainly as a propaganda machine especially during the state of emergency between 1954 - 1960.

== After Independence ==
In 1962 in the lead up to independence, the department was moved to the Ministry of State for Constitutional Affairs and Administration under then Hon. Mr. Ronald G. Ngala. On December 5, 1963, the Kenya News Agency was created. On December 12, 1963 Kenya attained self-rule and the Office of the Prime Minister was established with Hon. Mzee Jomo Kenyatta as the first Prime Minister of Kenya. Kenyatta convened his cabinet with the Hon. R. Achieng Oneko as the first Minister for Information, Broadcasting and Tourism. The Ministry's functions then included Information Service (including Publications & Photographic Services) and the then newly created Kenya News Agency and Press Office.

As a state-owned agency the Kenya News Agency was expected to project a positive image of Kenya and promote the work of the Government. With a national network, the Agency was initially the primary source of news report from outside the capital Nairobi, but as the road networks expanded and internet infrastructure improved, access to the rural areas became easier and more affordable for private sector news organisation to send their own reporters to cover news outside Nairobi.

In 2016 Kenya News Agency made its historic image collection (more than 50,000 images) available online through a public portal Urithi. Urithi also includes audio and video content sourced from the Kenya Broadcasting Corporation.

== Publications ==
The Kenya News Agency has in the past produced the following publications:

- Habari [1921 Monthly]
- Habari za Vita (News of the War) [Weekly]
- Baraza [1939]
- Pamoja [1939]
- Kenya Today
