= Jimmy Mbugua =

Kenyan professional footballer

Jimmy Mbugua Ndungi (born 27 May 1998) is a Kenyan footballer who turns out for Kenyan side Nairobi City Stars as a defender. He formerly featured for Tusker F.C. including its youth side, and Posta Rangers in the Kenyan Premier League.
