= Jonathan Jackson Foundation =

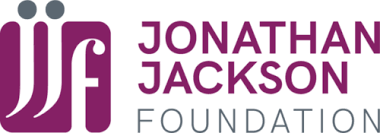
- Formation: 2019; 7 years ago
- Founder: Jonathan Jackson
- Type: Non-Governmental Organization
- Headquarters: 4th Ngong Avenue, Upper Hill, Nairobi, Kenya
- President: Jonathan Jackson
- CEO: Diana Sifuna
- Website: jonathanjacksonfoundation.org//

Jonathan Jackson Foundation (JJF), founded in the year 2019, is a Nairobi-based non-governmental organization that aims to provide sustainable livelihoods for youth and women in informal settlements in Kenya. JJF's transformative agenda is to provide the target group with a fishing rod and teach them how to become self-sustainable. The foundation's pillars include economic empowerment through the Jenga Bizna Mtaani program, sports (Basketball & football), and Humanitarian aid through the Jenga Jirani initiative.

Under Sports, the foundation constructs basketball courts under the banner Bakee Mtaani which is aimed at providing safe spaces for the youth. The foundation also owns and sponsors Kawangware-based Kenyan Premier League side Nairobi City Stars, a team it uses as a vehicle to drive change within communities.
