= Dennis Okoth =

Kenyan footballer

Personal information
- Full name: Dennis Okoth
- Date of birth: 12 February 1982 (age 44)
- Height: 1.70 m (5 ft 7 in)
- Position: Midfielder

Senior career*
Years	Team	Apps	(Gls)
2003–2008	World Hope		
2009–2010	Nairobi City Stars	50	(3)
2011	Gor Mahia F.C.	13	(0)
2012	SoNy Sugar F.C.	25	(2)
2013-2014	Nairobi City Stars	55	(4)

Managerial career
- 2015–2016: Nairobi City Stars (assistant)
- 2017: Dagoretti Santos F.C. (coach)
- * Club domestic league appearances and goals

Dennis Wise Okoth is a retired Kenyan midfielder who featured for Kenyan Premier League sides Nairobi City Stars, Gor Mahia F.C. and Sony Sugar. He is currently a local and school coach.

== Career ==
=== Player ===
Okoth first turned out for World Hope since its inception in 2003 and was part of the squad that promoted the side to the Kenyan Premier League in the 2004/5 season. He was at the club till 2008 season and extended his stay for another two seasons in 2009 and 2010 after the club was rechristened Nairobi City Stars.

He then moved to Gor Mahia F.C. in 2011 and then to Sony Sugar in the 2012 season. He returned to Nairobi City Stars in 2013 and 2014 before calling it a day at the end of that season.

=== Coaching ===
After active playing, he stayed on at City Stars as assistant coach in 2015, sometimes as interim coach, and in 2016 when the team was relegated. He served as the City Stars U-20 coach in 2016 team. He currently coaches his childhood team Dagoretti Santos F.C. and Rusinga School where is engaged as a Soccer coach.

== Honours ==
=== Club ===
World Hope

- KFF Nationwide Champion: (2004)
- FKF President's Cup: (2005)

=== Individual ===
Nairobi City Stars

- Fair Play player of the year (2009): KPL Awards
