= Justus Basweti =

Kenyan footballer (born 1984)

Personal information
- Date of birth: 1 August 1978 (age 48)
- Height: 1.73 m (5 ft 8 in)
- Position: Striker

Senior career*
Years	Team	Apps	(Gls)
2000–2002	A.F.C. Leopards		
2002-2003	Nzoia Sugar		
2003-2004	A.F.C. Leopards		
2004-2007	World Hope		
2007	A.F.C. Leopards		
2008	World Hope	16	(2)
2009-2014	Nairobi City Stars	110	(7)

International career^{‡}
2001	Kenya	4	(0)
- * Club domestic league appearances and goals as of 19:31, 19 April 2022 (UTC) ‡ National team caps and goals as of 19:31, 19 April 2022 (UTC)

Justus Basweti (born 1 August 1984) is a former Kenyan striker who turned out for A.F.C. Leopards, Nzoia Sugar, Nairobi City Stars and the Kenya national football team.

== Career ==
Basweti had three different stints at A.F.C. Leopards in 2000–2, 2003–4, and 2007, and featured for Nzoia Sugar in 2002–3, and World Hope in 2004–2008 before it was rechristened Nairobi City Stars where he ran out his league career in 2014 after five seasons from 2009.

He missed out on a chance to return to A.F.C. Leopards for a fourth stint in the 2015 season. He is Nairobi City Stars all-time top scorer across all competitions with 35 goals.

== Awards ==
He won the domestic Cup with A.F.C. Leopards in 2001 after scoring twice in a 2–0 win over Mathare United and won the second one with World Hope in 2005 after grabbing a brace in a 2–1 win over Tusker F.C.

== Honours ==
=== Club ===
AFC Leopards

- Moi Golden Cup: (2001)

World Hope

- FKF President's Cup: (2005)

== International career ==
Basweti was capped four times for Kenya during the 2001 CECAFA Cup held in Amahoro, Rwanda. He was handed his maiden national cap on 10 December 2001 by Reinhard Fabisch in Kenya's opening game against Eritrea
