= Anthony Kimani =

Kenyan footballer (born 1989)

Anthony Kimani Njenga
Personal information
- Full name: Anthony Kimani Njenga
- Date of birth: 31 July 1989 (age 37)
- Place of birth: Nairobi, Kenya
- Height: 1.83 m (6 ft 0 in)
- Position: Midfielder

Youth career
- Dagoretti Santos

Senior career*
Years	Team	Apps	(Gls)
2008-2009	Nairobi City Stars	32	(2)
2010-2014	Sofapaka	116	(12)
2015-2017	Bandari	48	(13)
2019-2020	Nairobi City Stars	23	(3)
2020-2023	Nairobi City Stars	77	(11)

International career^{‡}
2010–2013	Kenya	10	(0)
- * Club domestic league appearances and goals as of 25 June 2023 ‡ National team caps and goals as of 10 September 2019

Anthony "Muki" Kimani Njenga is a Kenyan former Kenyan midfielder who last featured for Kenyan Premier League side Nairobi City Stars. He announced his retirement from professional football on 25 June 2023.

== Career ==
Muki, born and raised in Riruta in the periphery of Nairobi, was inspired to take up football by his elder sibling Francis Thairu.

He started off his football at Dagoretti Santos then Kenyatta National Hospital in the Kenyan second tier before joining World Hope F.C. in the Kenyan Premier League in 2008.

In 2009 he was signed by Sofapaka by opted to return to City Stars for regular football as he felt he 'was not mature enough' to compete with the more seasoned players at the promoted side. He rejoined Sofapaka in 2010 and at the end of the season he was unanimously voted the Kenyan Premier League midfielder of 2010.

He stayed on at Sofapaka for another three seasons till the end of 2014. During his time at Batoto ba Mungu - as Sofa are fondly known - Muki also won the best midfielder award during the 2013 GOtv Shield edition.

He then crossed over to Coastal side Bandari whom he served for two seasons before taking a break due to work-related commitments. At the end of the season he led the side to the Domestic Cup.

After two and a half years Muki came out of the woods to return to competitive football by rejoining Nairobi City Stars for the 2019 season. He extended his stay at the club for two more seasons following promotion to the Kenyan Premier League at the end of the 2019–20 season. He added yet another season thereafter, for a third season in the top league, that would keep him at the club till the end of the 2022–23 season.

He called time on his career on Sun 25 June 2023 in the final game of the 2022-23 FKF Premier League against Gor Mahia F.C. in Kasarani Stadium.

== National team ==
While at Sofapaka in 2010 he earned his debut call to the Kenya National team Harambee Stars by head coach Jacob Mulee and went on to earn his first cap in an international friendly against host Tanzania in Dar es Salaam on 29 November 2010.

He featured for Kenya in the 2010 and 2012 Cecafa Senior Challenge Cups in Tanzania and Uganda, respectively. In total he earned ten caps.

== Coaching journey ==
In March 2023, Muki started acquiring his coaching badges by completing a CAF 'D' Diploma license course.

== Honors ==
=== Individual ===
Sofapaka

- 2010 Kenyan Premier League - Midfielder of the Year
- 2012 Sofapaka vs Oserian MVP
- 2013 FKF President's Cup - Best Midfielder
- 2015 FOYA - Best Midfielder nominee

=== Club ===
Sofapaka

- Kenyan Super Cup: 2010
- Kenyan Super Cup: 2011
- 2013 FKF President's Cup

Bandari

- 2015 FKF President's Cup
- Kenyan Super Cup: 2016
