= Arthur Museve =

Kenyan footballer (born 1981)

Arthur Muchera Museve
Personal information
- Full name: Arthur Muchera Museve
- Date of birth: 5 January 1981 (age 45)
- Height: 1.78 m (5 ft 10 in)
- Position: Defender

Senior career*
Years	Team	Apps	(Gls)
2004	Securicor		
2005-2008	World Hope FC		
2009-2016	Nairobi City Stars	173	(18)
2017-2019	Nairobi City Stars		
- * Club domestic league appearances and goals

Arthur Muchera Museve is retired Kenyan defender who turned for Kenyan Premier League sides Securicor, World Hope FC and Nairobi City Stars.

== Career ==
Arthur started out at Kenyan Premier League side Securicor in 2003 before joining Nairobi City Stars in 2004, and went on to serve in the top flight till the team's relegation at the end of the 2016 season.

He stayed at the club for a further three seasons; 2017, 2018 and 2018/19 as the team competed in the second tier, before finally calling it a day to join the technical bench as a trainer.

Arthur was best known for headers and penalties, and top-scored for the club in the 2008 season with seven goals, and in the 2009 season with ten goals.

== Honours ==
=== Club ===
World Hope

- KFF Nationwide Champion: (2004)
- FKF President's Cup: (2005)
