= George Odhiambo =

Kenyan footballer (born 1992)

Personal information
- Full name: George Odhiambo Ogutu
- Date of birth: 31 December 1992 (age 33)
- Place of birth: Thur Gem, Kenya
- Height: 1.75 m (5 ft 9 in)
- Positions: Winger; forward

Team information
- Current team: Gor Mahia

Senior career*
Years	Team	Apps	(Gls)
2009–2011	Gor Mahia	46	(18)
2011–2012	Randers	1	(0)
2012	KuPS		
2012–2013	Azam		
2013	Shirak	10	(1)
2013	Ulisses	11	(1)
2014–2019	Gor Mahia	124	(16)
2019–2022	Tusker		
2022–2023	Gor Mahia		

International career^{‡}
2009–2017	Kenya	22	(1)
- * Club domestic league appearances and goals as of 8 January 2014 ‡ National team caps and goals as of 21 July 2023

George Odhiambo Ogutu (Blackberry) is a Kenyan professional footballer lastly played for Gor Mahia in the Kenyan Premier League. He was featured in Goal.com's 100 Young Stars to Look Out for in 2011.

As of 2024 Berry was in the ranks of Barca veterans fc

== Club career ==
George Odhiambo attended Thur Gem High School. He began his career playing for Gor Mahia of Kenya at the age of 16. He became a star player for Gor Mahia and was awarded the "Most Promising Player" award in the 2009 Kenyan Premier League. In the 2010 season, he was awarded the Kenyan Premier League Player of the Year award.

=== Randers ===
George was signed by Danish Superliga club Randers FC in January 2011. He made his debut in a match against FC Nordsjælland. He came on the pitch, replacing Jonas Kamper and the match ended 2–1 to the opponent.

=== Azam ===
After a rather unsuccessful season in Denmark, Odhiambo signed with Azam in the Tanzanian Premier League at the start of the 2012 season. However, he fell out of favour within the squad and was released from his contract in July.

=== Nairobi City Stars ===
Having been a free agent for nearly six months, Odhiambo signed a six-month deal with the Nairobi City Stars in the Tusker Premier League on 9 January 2013.

=== Shirak FC ===
On 28 February 2013, Odhiambo signed a 3-year contract with ambitious Armenian club Shirak after impressing during a two-week trial. Odhiambo made his debut for Shirak on 3 March against Ararat Yerevan in the Armenian Cup. Odhiambo's first goal for Shirak came on 30 March 2013 in a 4–3 victory over Impulse in the Armenian Premier League.

=== Return to Gor Mahia ===
On 7 January 2014, it was announced that Odhiambo returned to his former team Gor Mahia, signing a one-year deal.

=== Tusker ===
On 8 August 2019, Odhiambo joined Tusker on a two-year deal.

== International career ==
George has been a regular in the Kenya national football team since 2009, playing alongside stars such as McDonald Mariga and Dennis Oliech.

== Style of play ==
George plays primarily as a winger and can also operate as a striker. He is known for his pace and dribbling ability.

=== Nickname ===
Curiously, George is known to his fans as "BlackBerry". It is believed that this moniker was given to him by a local journalist, who upon seeing the forward play remarked, "He is like my blackberry; he can do everything."

== Achievements ==
Shirak

- Armenian Premier League : 2012–13
- Armenian Cup runner-up: 2012–13
