= John Makwatta =

Kenyan footballer (born 1995)

Personal information
- Full name: John Mark Makwatta
- Date of birth: 1 June 1995 (age 31)
- Place of birth: Bureti, Kenya
- Height: 1.73 m (5 ft 8 in)
- Position: Striker

Team information
- Current team: ZESCO United F.C.

Youth career
- JMJ Academy

Senior career*
| Years | Team | Apps | (Gls) |
| 2011–2013 | Nairobi City Stars | 6 | |
| 2013–2016 | Ulinzi | 63 | (38) |
| 2017–2018 | Buildcon F.C. | 23 | (12) |
| 2019–2020 | A.F.C. Leopards | 16 | (14) |
| 2020- | ZESCO United F.C. | 3 | (3) |

International career^{‡}
| 2016– | Kenya | 11 | (0) |
- * Club domestic league appearances and goals as of 09 October 2017 ‡ National team caps and goals as of 09 October 2017

John Mark Makwatta is a Kenyan born football player who plays for ZESCO United F.C. in the Zambia Super League, and also the Kenya national team.

== Nairobi City Stars ==
He was recruited while playing for Kenyan JMJ Academy, in his early days; he played as a midfielder before the then Nairobi City Stars coach Jan Koops converted him into a striker. He spent three seasons with the Nairobi-based outfit before he was snapped up by Ulinzi Stars F.C. During his departure, Jan Koops described him as an integral part of the team whose effect would be missed. He left Nairobi City Stars together with Boniface Onyango with whom they had a blossoming partnership that yielded five goals.

== Ulinzi Stars F.C. ==
On 24 October 2013, Makwatta joined Kenyan Premier League Side Ulinzi Stars F.C., that is when his attacking flair and thirst for goal was discovered. At first, he was deployed as a midfielder but was later moved upfront where he thrived during his second season with the Nakuru-based outfit. During the 2015 season, he finished as the second runners-up with fourteen goals from twenty-six matches only eight goals shy of the top scorer Jesse Were and five shy of Michael Olunga who finished as the runners-up. By the first half of 2016, Makwatta was the runners-up to Wycliffe Ochomo who pipped him to the top spot by only a goal whilst having played three more matches than Makwatta, Makwatta had ten goals from eleven matches while Ochomo had eleven goals from fourteen appearances. His Ulinzi coach Robert Matano was once quoted saying that Makwatta was a humble, obedient and a very good forward. Makwatta finished the 2016 Kenya Premier League season as the top scorer.

== Buildcon F.C. ==
In 2017, Makwatta joined the Zambia Super League team Buildcon F.C.

== International career ==
Makwatta made his international debut on 29 May 2016 at Moi International Sports Centre, Kasarani coming in as a substitute for Ayub Masika in the 82nd minute, the match ended on a 1–1 draw.

== Honours ==
Personal achievements:

- Sport journalist association Kenya (SJAK) player of the month April 2015.
- Goal.com Kenya player of the week on 5 October 2015.
- Soka Player of the month
