= Francis Thairu =

Kenyan footballer

Personal information
- Full name: Francis Thairu
- Date of birth: 7 September 1979 (age 47)
- Height: 1.80 m (5 ft 11 in)
- Position: Midfielder

Senior career*
Years	Team	Apps	(Gls)
1999-2002	Kawangware United		
2003–2008	World Hope	18	(1)
2009–2013	Nairobi City Stars	115	(15)
2019	Nakumatt FC		
- * Club domestic league appearances and goals

Francis Thairu is a retired Kenyan midfielder who featured for Kenyan Premier League sides Kawangware United, Nairobi City Stars, and Nakumatt FC.

== Career ==
Thairu featured for Kawangware United in the premier league up to 2002 but left to join the newly formed World Hope in 2003. He was part of the squad that promoted the side to the Kenyan Premier League in the 2004/5 season. He stayed at the club till the 2008 season and even after new ownership took over and renamed the club to Nairobi City Stars in 2009. He left the team at the close of the 2013 season.

Thairu top-scored for Nairobi City Stars in the 2010 season and scored crucial goals that ultimately saved the club from relegation in the 2011 season. The goals included a hattrick in the 2011 season-ender that led to a 4–2 win over Karuturi Sports at Hope centre.

He remained active in football after 2013 by featuring for lower-tier sides in tournaments as player and coach before making a return to the top flight league once again when he joined Nakumatt FC in 2019.

== Sibling ==
Thairu is the elder sibling of Anthony Kimani, the current Nairobi City Stars captain.

== Honours ==
=== Club ===
World Hope

- KFF Nationwide Champion: (2004)
- FKF President's Cup: (2005)
