= Bai Malleh Wadda =

Gambian football manager

Personal information
- Full name: Bai Malleh Wadda
- Date of birth: 22 October 1959 (age 67)

Bai Malleh Mustapha Wadda or BMW is a former Gambian multi-athlete currently coaching GFA League First Division side Real de Banjul FC.

Wadda formerly coached Kenyan Premier League side Nairobi City Stars from late 2012 to mid-2013 as a replacement for Gideon Ochieng.

He was re-appointed Real de Banjul FC in April 2021 to replace Ebou Jarra.

== Private life ==
He is married to Oley Dibba-Wadda and they have five children.
