= World Hope Stadium =

Football stadium in Nairobi, Kenya

Hope Centre
- Full name: World Hope Stadium
- Location: Nairobi, Kenya
- Capacity: 5,000

Tenants
- Administration Police; Kenya Revenue Authority; Nairobi City Stars; Vapor

The World Hope Stadium, commonly known as Hope Centre., is a football stadium in Kawangware, a suburb in Nairobi, Kenya. It is currently by the Nairobi City Stars of the Kenyan Premier League, and Administration Police and Kenya Revenue Authority of FKF Division One. The stadium has a capacity of 5,000 spectators.
