= Nairobi City Stars =

- Full name: Nairobi City Stars
- Nickname: Simba wa Nairobi
- Founded: 2003; 23 years ago
- Ground: Hope Centre, Kawangware, Kenya
- Capacity: 5,000
- Owner: Jonathan Jackson Foundation
- Chairman: Jonathan Jackson
- League: National Super League
- 2025–26: 14th
- Website: nairobicitystarsfc.org
Home colours	Away colours

Nairobi City Stars is a professional football club based in Nairobi, Kenya that currently competes in the first tier Kenyan Premier League.

== History ==
The club was founded in 2003 as World Hope Football Club after a majority of players followed head coach Zedekiah 'Zico' Otieno from relegated Kawangware United. The club was formed and owned by World Hope International, a charitable organization.

After one season in the Nationwide League, World Hope was promoted to the Kenyan Premier League.

In October 2008, the club was bought by Ambassadors in Sport (AIS Kenya), who renamed the club to Nairobi City Stars FC after the 2008 season.

After the take over Nairobi City Stars was initially coached by German manager Oliver Page, a former Bundesliga player. He resigned from the post-half-season in June 2009 despite good results, citing personal issues

After a short while under the new owners, the team reverted to Peter Jabuya who would struggle with the team till March 2019 when the club was fully acquired by Jonathan Jackson Foundation, a community-focused setup named after its founder Jonathan Jackson who is a real estate mogul in Kenya and in Europe.

Upon the change of hands the new owners hired online journalist Patrick Korir as the CEO to streamline the club's operations. And in July 2019 the club went searching for a foreign coach and hired Sarajevo-born Sanjin Alagić, a UEFA Pro licensed coach from Bosnia and Herzegovina.

He led the team to the 2019/20 Kenyan National Super League title and automatic promotion back to the Kenyan Premier League after four seasons out.

Alagić exited at the expiry of his contract at the end of June 2021. From September of the same year Nicholas Muyoti was appointed the new coach on a three-year deal.

Salim Babu took over from Muyoti and served till the expiry of his contract in April 2026 handing over the reigns to Scotland-trained Eugene Ochola who joined the club in 2024 as an apprentice.

== Honors ==
- Kenya Nationwide League
  - Champions (1): 2003–04
- FKF President's Cup
  - Champions (1): 2005
- Kenyan National Super League
  - Champions (1): 2019–20

== Performance in CAF competitions ==
- CAF Confederation Cup: 1 appearance

2006 – Preliminary Round

== Current squad ==
As of 30 Jan 2025.

Note: Flags indicate national team as defined under FIFA eligibility rules; some limited exceptions apply. Players may hold more than one non-FIFA nationality.

No.	Pos.	Nation	Player
1	GK	KEN	Edwin Mukolwe
13	GK	KEN	Elvis Ochoro
32	GK	KEN	Byron Owino
2	DF	KEN	Salim Odeka
4	DF	KEN	Timothy Muganda
6	DF	KEN	Brian Opinde
8	DF	KEN	Calvin Masawa
12	DF	KEN	Edwin Buliba
15	DF	KEN	Jimmy Mbugua
21	DF	KEN	Rogers Wasega
22	DF	TAN	Stephen Bulugu
30	DF	KEN	Rowland Makati
3	MF	KEN	Sven Yidah
14	MF	KEN	Joseph Mwangi

No.	Pos.	Nation	Player
16	MF	KEN	Elvis Noor
18	MF	KEN	Kevin Simiyu
19	MF	KEN	Vincent Owino
25	MF	KEN	Brian Mzee
31	MF	KEN	Abuyeka Kubasu
5	FW	KEN	Robinson Asenwa
9	FW	KEN	Hansel Ochieng
10	FW	KEN	Dennis Oalo
17	FW	KEN	Brian Nyambane
20	FW	KEN	Kelvin Etemesi
11	FW	KEN	Maxwell Odada
27	FW	KEN	Gilbert Abala
29	FW	KEN	Benjamin Mosha

== Club officials ==
=== Management ===
Chairman	(Kenya) Jonathan Jackson
Chief Executive	(Kenya) Patrick Korir
Team Coordinator	(Kenya) Samson Otieno

=== Technical Bench ===
Position	Name
Interim Head coach	(Kenya) Eugene Ochola
Goalkeeper coach	(Kenya) Ronnie Kagunzi
Team Manager	(Kenya) Calvin Masawa
Trainer	(Kenya) Arthur Museve
Physio	(Kenya) Dennis Wandola
Kit Manager	(Kenya) Dominic Mutiso

== Past coaches ==
- (Kenya) Zedekiah 'Zico' Otieno (Sep 2003-Nov 2004)
- (Kenya) Robert Matano (Nov 2004 - Nov 2007)
- (Kenya) John “Bobby” Ogolla (Jan-Nov 2008)
- (Germany) Oliver Pagé (Nov 2008-May 2009)
- (Kenya) Kennedy Odhiambo (May 2009-Aug 2011)
- (Kenya) Gideon Ochieng (Aug 2011-Sep 2012)
- (The Gambia) Bai Malleh Wadda (Sep 2012-June 2013)
- (Kenya) Charles Omondi (June-Sep 2013)
- (Netherlands) Jan Koops (Sep 2013-Jan 2014)
- (Nigeria) Robinson Ndubuisi (Jan-Apr 2014)
- (England) Tim Bryett (Apr-Jul 2014)
- (Nigeria) Robinson Ndubuisi (Jul-Dec 2014)
- (Uganda) Paul Nkata (Jan-June 2015)
- (Kenya) Gabriel Njoroge (Jul-Sep 2015)
- (Kenya) Dennis Okoth (Sep-Dec 2015)
- (Kenya) John “Bobby” Ogolla (Jan-June 2016)
- (Uganda) Richard Pinto Tamale (Jul-Dec 2016)
- (Kenya) Robert Matano (Jan-May 2017)
- (Uganda) Abdul-Samadu Musafiri (Jul-Dec 2017)
- (Kenya) John Amboko (Jan-Dec 2018)
- (Uganda) Jimmy Kintu (Jan-Apr 2019)
- (Kenya) John Amboko (Apr-Jun 2019)
- (Bosnia and Herzegovina) Sanjin Alagić (July 2019 - June 2021)
- (Kenya) John Amboko (Jul-Aug 2019)
- (Kenya) Nicholas Muyoti (Sept 2021-Jan 2025)
- (Kenya) Salim Babu (Jan 2025-Apr 2026)
- (Kenya) Eugene Ochola (Apr 2026-To date)

== Notable past players ==
- (Kenya) Victor Wanyama
- (Kenya) John Mark Makwatta
- (Uganda) Dan Sserunkuma
- (Kenya) James Situma
- (Kenya) Pascal Ochieng
- (Kenya) Kennedy Odhiambo
- (Kenya) Thomas Wanyama
- (Kenya) George Odhiambo
- (Kenya) Harrison Muranda
- (Kenya) Collins Tiego
- (Kenya) Levy Muaka
- (Kenya) Wesley Onguso
- (Uganda) George Abege
- (Kenya) Francis Thairu
- (Kenya) George Midenyo
- (Kenya) George Odary
- (Kenya) Victor Ochieng
- (Kenya) Erick Ochieng
- (Kenya) Paul Okatwa
- (Uganda) Lawrence Kasadha
- (Kenya) Justus Basweti
- (Kenya) Kevin Ochieng
- (Kenya) Noah Abich
- (Kenya) Edward Karanja
- (Kenya) Peter Opiyo
- (Kenya) Anthony Kimani
- (Kenya) Timothy Ouma
- (Kenya) Kenedy Onyango
- (Kenya) Mohammed Bajaber

== Top scorers per season ==
Top scorers per season. * Award shared during that season

Year	Player	Goals
*2004-5	(Kenya) Collins Tiego	5
*2004-5	(Kenya) Justus Basweti	5
2005-6	(Kenya) Samuel Ouma	13
2006-7	(Kenya) Justus Basweti	6
2008	(Kenya) Arthur Museve	7
2009	(Kenya) Arthur Museve	10
2010	(Kenya) Francis Thairu	5
2011	(Uganda) Dan Sserunkuma	7
2012	(Uganda) Dan Sserunkuma	5
2013	(Uganda) Jimmy Bageya	4
*2014	(Kenya) Dennis Okoth	3
*2014	(Uganda) George Abege	3
*2014	(Uganda) Lawrence Kasadha	3
2015	(The Gambia) Ebrimah Sanneh	11
2016	(Kenya) Ezekiel Odera	4
2017	(Kenya) Ezekiel Odera	11
2018	(Uganda) Sande Katumba	10
2018–19	(Kenya) Noah Abich	8
2019–20	(The Gambia) Ebrimah Sanneh	8
2020–21	(Kenya) Peter Opiyo	8
2021–22	(Kenya) Ezekiel Odera	10
2022–23	(Kenya) Kelvin Etemesi	12
2023–24	(Kenya) Vincent Owino	8
2024–25	(Kenya) Vincent Owino	5
2025–26	(Kenya) Joshua Amunike	8

== All time top scorers ==
A list of all-time Nairobi City Stars goal scorers. For players who scored 12 or more goals.

As of 22 February 2026

#	Player	Goals
1	(Kenya) Ezekiel Odera	37
2	(Kenya) Justus Basweti	35
3	(Kenya) Francis Thairu	34
4	(The Gambia) Ebrimah Sanneh	32
5	(Kenya) Arthur Museve	31
6	(Uganda) Jimmy Bageya	29
7	(Kenya) Davis Agesa	20
8	(Kenya) Kelvin Etemesi	19
9	(Kenya) Anthony Kimani	17
10	(Kenya) Vincent Owino	16
11	(Uganda) Sande Katumba	15
12	(Kenya) Samuel Ouma	14
13	(Kenya) Peter Opiyo	13
14	(Uganda) Dan Sserunkuma	12
14	(Kenya) Robert Ndung'u	12

== Records ==
Type	Nat	Name	Record
Most Premier League appearances (City Stars)	(Kenya)	John Amboko	221
Most Premier League appearances (overall)	(Kenya)	Anthony Kimani	284
Most Premier League goals	(Kenya)	Justus Basweti	27
Most Super League goals	(Kenya)	Davis Agesa	17
Overall top scorer	(Kenya)	Ezekiel Odera	37
Most capped player	(Kenya)	James Situma	43
Most league goals in a Premier League season	(Kenya)	Samuel Ouma	13
Most goals in a Super League season	(Kenya)	Ezekiel Odera	11
Longest unbeaten Super League run	(Kenya)	2018/19-2019/20 NSL	22
Record premier league win run	(Kenya)	2023–24 FKF PL	7
Record victory	(Kenya)	vs Vihiga Bullets vs Kisumu Telkom vs Congo United	4-0
Record defeat	(Kenya)	vs Sofapaka F.C. vs Kakamega Homeboyz	5-0

=== Premier League records ===
Season	Pos	Record								
Season	Pos	P	W	D	L	F	A	GD	CS	Pts!
2004–05	8	22	7	7	8	22	23	-1	7	28
2005–06	7	38	14	13	11	43	41	2	16	55
2006–07	8	30	11	9	10	31	28	3	11	42
2008	7	30	11	7	12	25	31	-6	10	40
2009	6	30	11	10	9	30	29	1	10	43
2010	11	30	7	13	10	25	34	-9	8	34
2011	14	30	8	7	15	28	35	-7	9	31
2012	13	30	6	11	13	16	32	-6	14	29
2013	9	30	7	11	12	24	36	-12	9	32
2014	15	30	4	12	14	18	35	-17	8	24
2015	14	30	6	10	14	25	37	-12	7	28
2016	16	30	3	10	17	17	39	-22	7	19
2020-21	7	32	12	9	11	34	30	4	11	45
2021-22	5	33	14	10	10	45	34	11	14	52
2022–23	15	34	8	10	16	37	49	-12	8	34
2023–24	6	34	13	11	10	42	39	3	12	50
2024–25	18	34	8	11	15	26	41	-15	7	35
Total		527	150	171	207	488	591	-103	168	621

CS - Clean Sheet

=== Second tier League records ===
Season	Pos	Record								
Season	Pos	P	W	D	L	F	A	GD	CS	Pts
2003-4	CHAMPIONS									
2017	7	36	12	12	12	45	42	3	11	48
2018	7	36	14	10	12	41	39	2	10	52
2018-19	14	38	8	15	15	47	60	-13	3	39
2019-20	CHAMPIONS	26	20	4	2	40	18	22	14	64
2025-26	14	38	9	12	17	31	44	-13	11	39
Total		174	63	53	58	204	203	1	48	242
