= 2014 Nairobi City Stars season =

Kenyan football club season

Nairobi City Stars
2014 KPL season
- Owner: Peter Jabuya
- Chairman: Peter Jabuya
- Head coach: Robinson Ndubuisi
- Stadium: Hope Centre
- Kenyan Premier League: 15th
- GOtv Shield: Round of 32
- Top goalscorer: League: George Abege, Dennis Okoth, Lawrence Kasadha (3 each); All: George Abege, Dennis Okoth, Lawrence Kasadha (3 each)
- Biggest win: 4-0 vs Magongo Rangers, 9 Jul 2014, GOtv Shield
- Biggest defeat: 1-4 vs Gor Mahia (H), 4 Oct 2014, Kenyan Premier League

The 2014 season was Nairobi City Stars' tenth consecutive season in the Kenyan Premier League, the top tier of Kenyan football. The club was relegated after finishing 15th in the 16-team league, having managed only four wins throughout the season and struggled in front of goal after scoring just 18 times in 30 league matches, the second lowest tally.

The club lacked a prolific goal scorer, with captain Dennis Okoth, in his last season as a player, and Ugandan imports George Abege and Lawrence Kasadha, both signed from SC Victoria University before the season, finishing as the team's joint top scorers with three goals each.

The season was marked by instability on the technical bench, with three coaching spells during the year. Dutchman Jan Koops exited at the end of the previous season and was succeeded by Nigerian coach Robinson Ndubuisi Ofwoku, who oversaw the team from January to April handling matchdays 1-9. British coach Tim Bryett then took charge between April and July handling matchdays 8-16 and two cup games before quitting allowing Ndubuisi, whom he had relegated to assistant coach when he took over, to make a return for a second spell that lasted from matchdays 17-30 between July until the end of the season in November.

Despite efforts to retain their top-flight status, City Stars were unable to avoid relegation after garnering only seven points out of a possible 42 in the final 14 games under Ndubuisi's second sting and were demoted to the second tier for the first time since earning promotion ahead of the 2004 Kenyan Premier League season.

The season saw the exit of key players Francis Thairu and Silas Aluvisia at the end of the past season and the entry of Tusker trio Kevin Ochieng, Victor Maloba and Kevin Oliech. Some young players joined the club ranks including keeper Kevin Omondi of ASEC Huruma and Nicholas Kamau who joined from Dandora All Stars, who were named first and second runners up 'New player of the year', respectively, at the end of the season during the end-year awards.

== Technical Bench ==
Position	Staff
Head coach	(Nigeria) Robinson Ndubuisi
First Assistant coach	(Kenya) Joseph Jagero
Second Assistant coach	(Kenya) Kennedy Odhiambo
Goalkeeper coach	(Kenya)
Team manager	(Kenya) Neville Pudo
Team Physio	(Kenya) Dennis Mugisha

Source: Standard

=== Squad information ===
Players and squad numbers last updated on 5 June 2026. Appearances include all competitions.
Note: Flags indicate national team as has been defined under FIFA eligibility rules. Players only hold one non-FIFA nationality.

No.	Player	Nat.	Positions	Signed in	Contract ends	Signed from	Apps.	Goals
Goalkeepers
1	Kevin Omondi	(Kenya)	GK	2014	2014	(Kenya) ASEC Huruma	8	0
23	Fredrick Majani	(Kenya)	GK	2008	2014	(Kenya) Nairobi City Stars	20	0
30	Michael Juma	(Kenya)	GK	2014	2014	(Kenya) FISA Academy (loan)	3	0
Defenders
2	David Otieno	(Kenya)	DF	2014	2014	(Kenya) Gor Mahia	25	0
5	John Amboko	(Kenya)	CB	2012	2014	Contract Renewal	27	0
7	Mike Simiyu	(Kenya)	CB	2014	2014	(Kenya) Western Stima	4	0
8	Calvin Masawa	(Kenya)	LB / RB	2011	2014	Contract Renewal	19	0
13	Collins Okumu	(Kenya)	DF	2014	2014	Unattached	8	0
18	Arthur Museve	(Kenya)	CB	2008	2014	(Kenya) Securicor FC	6	0
19	Evans Chief	(Kenya)	RB	2014	2014	(Kenya) Kibera Black Stars	2	0
24	Andrew Ongwae	(Kenya)	DF	2012	2014	Contract renewal	17	0
Midfielders
3	Moses Otieno	(Kenya)	CM	2014	2014	(Kenya) Tusker	3	0
4	Dennis Okoth	(Kenya)	CM	2013	2014	(Kenya) SoNy Sugar	28	3
11	Oscar Mbugua	(Kenya)	AM	2014	2014	Unattached	9	0
12	Nelson Marasowe	(Nigeria)	CM	2014	2014	Unattached	13	0
16	Joseph Kayiira	(Uganda)	CM / DM	2014	2014	(Uganda) SC Victoria University	8	0
20	Ismael Kabugu	(Uganda)	MF	2014	2014	(Uganda) Proline FC	10	1
21	Victor Ashinga	(Kenya)	MF	2011	2014	Contract renewal	12	0
22	Nicholas Kamau	(Kenya)	FW	2014	2014	(Kenya) Dandora All Stars	9	0
24	Simon Ogutu	(Kenya)	MF	2010	2014	Contract renewal	10	0
28	Lawrence Kasadha	(Uganda)	CM	2014	2014	(Uganda) SC Victoria University	18	3
40	Musa Asad	(South Sudan)	MF	2014	2014	(Kenya) Kibera Talent	11	0
99	Kevin Ochieng	(Kenya)	MF	2014	2014	(Kenya) Tusker	23	1
Forwards
9	Justus Basweti	(Kenya)	ST	2008	2014	Contract renewal	23	1
10	Kevin Oliech	(Kenya)	FW	2014	2014	(Kenya) Tusker	8	0
14	Levy Muaka	(Kenya)	FW	2012	2014	Contract Renewal	6	0
17	George Abege	(Uganda)	ST	2014	2014	(Uganda) SC Victoria University	20	3
26	Raymond Omondi	(Kenya)	ST	2013	2014	Contract renewal	12	2
Players who left the club
No.	Player	Nat.	Positions	Signed in	Contract ends	Signed to	Apps.	Goals
11	George Midenyo	(Kenya)	ST	2014	2014	Free agent	4	0
12	Herbert Onunga	(Kenya)	CM	2013	2014	(Kenya) Ligi Ndogo	0	0
14	Dennis Ng'ang'a	(Kenya)	DF	2013	2014	(Kenya) Tusker FC	14	2
15	Victor Maloba	(Kenya)	MF	2014	2014	Free agent	3	0
22	Raquib Milanzi	(Malawi)	MF	2014	2014	Free agent	4	0
40	Jimmy Bageya	(Uganda)	ST	2013	2014	(Kenya) Bandari	14	2

Source: GSA

== Off season transfers ==
=== In ===
Date	Pos.	Player	From	Ref.
31 Jan 2014	ST	(Kenya) George Midenyo	(Kenya) Gor Mahia	
31 Jan 2014	MF	(Kenya) Moses Otieno	(Kenya) Tusker	
31 Jan 2014	MF	(Kenya) Victor Maloba	(Kenya) Tusker	
31 Jan 2014	MF	(Malawi) Raquib Milanzi	(Kenya) Tusker	
31 Jan 2014	ST	(Kenya) Kevin Oliech	(Kenya) Tusker	
31 Jan 2014	MF	(Kenya) Kevin Ochieng	(Kenya) Mathare United	
31 Jan 2014	RB	(Kenya) Evans Chief	(Kenya) Kibera Black Stars	
31 Jan 2014	MF	(Kenya) Timothy Kaimenyi	Unattached	
31 Jan 2014	MF	(Uganda) Joseph Kayiira	(Uganda) SC Victoria University	
31 Jan 2014	MF	(Uganda) Lawrence Kasadha	(Uganda) SC Victoria University	
31 Jan 2014	ST	(Uganda) George Abege	(Uganda) SC Victoria University	
31 Jan 2014	GK	(Kenya) Kevin Omondi	(Kenya) ASEC Huruma	

=== Out ===
Date	Pos.	Player	To	Ref.
Dec 2013	DF	(Uganda) Joel Ssebuliba	Free agent	
1 Feb 2014	MF	(Uganda) Bruno Sserunkuma	(Kenya) Bandari	
1 Feb 2014	GK	(Kenya) Ronny Kagunzi	(Kenya) Nakuru All Stars	
1 Feb 2014	DF	(Kenya) George Mwangi	(Kenya) Ushuru	
1 Feb 2014	AM	(Kenya) Francis Thairu	Retired	
1 Feb 2014	RB	(Kenya) Nicholas Meja	(Kenya) Moyas FC	
1 Feb 2014	ST	(Kenya) Sammy Bavon	Free agent	

=== In ===
Date	Pos.	Player	From	Ref.
18 Jun 2014	FW	(Kenya) Levy Muaka	(Kenya) Tusker	
18 Jun 2014	AM	(Kenya) Oscar Mbugua	(Kenya) Vapor Sports	
18 Jun 2014	MF	(Kenya) Wayne Ochieng	(Kenya) Vapor Sports	
18 Jun 2014	MF	(South Sudan) Musa Asad	(Kenya) Kibera Talent	
18 Jun 2014	GK	(Kenya) Michael Juma	(Kenya) FISA Academy (loan)	
18 Jun 2014	MF	(Nigeria) Nelson Marasowe	Unattached	
18 Jun 2014	MF	(Kenya) Nicholas Kamau	(Kenya) Dandora All Stars	
18 Jun 2014	MF	(Uganda) Ismail Kabugu	(Uganda) Proline FC	
18 Jun 2014	DF	(Uganda) David Otieno	(Kenya) Gor Mahia FC	

=== Out ===
Date	Pos.	Player	To	Ref.
14 Jun 2014	MF	(Kenya) Moses Otieno	(Kenya) Nakumatt	
14 Jun 2014	ST	(Kenya) George Midenyo	Free agents	
14 Jun 2014	MF	(Kenya) Victor Maloba	Free agents	
14 Jun 2014	MF	(Malawi) Raquib Milanzi	Free agents	
14 Jun 2014	DF	(Kenya) Dennis Ng'ang'a	(Kenya) Tusker	
14 Jun 2014	ST	(Uganda) Jimmy Bageya	(Kenya) Bandari	
14 Jun 2014	MF	(Kenya) Herbert Kunga	(Kenya) Ligi Ndogo	

== Competitions ==
=== Overall record ===
Competition	First match	Last match	Starting round	Final position	Record							
Competition	First match	Last match	Starting round	Final position	Pld	W	D	L	GF	GA	GD	Win %
2014 KPL	20 Feb 2014	8 Nov 2014	Matchday 1	15th	30	4	12	14	18	35	−17	13.33
2014 GOtv Shield	2 Jun 2014	9 Jul 2014	Round of 64	Round of 32	2	1	0	1	5	2	+3	50.00
Total					32	5	12	15	23	37	−14	15.63

Source: rsssf

=== Premier League ===
==== Results summary ====
Overall								Home						Away					
Pld	W	D	L	GF	GA	GD	Pts	W	D	L	GF	GA	GD	W	D	L	GF	GA	GD
30	4	12	14	18	35	−17	24	1	6	8	8	19	−11	3	6	6	10	16	−6

Source: Soccerway

==== Results by round ====
Round	1	2	3	4	5	6	7	8	9	10	11	12	13	14	15	16	17	18	19	20	21	22	23	24	25	26	27	28	29	30
Ground	A	H	A	H	A	H	A	H	A	H	H	A	H	A	H	A	A	H	A	H	A	H	A	H	A	H	A	H	A	H
Result	L	W	D	D	L	D	W	D	D	L	D	L	L	D	D	L	W	L	D	L	L	L	D	L	D	L	L	L	W	D
Position	14	10	8	8	13	11	10	11	12	12	13	14	14	14	14	14	14	14	14	14	14	14	15	15	15	15	15	15	15	15
Points	0	3	4	5	5	6	9	10	11	11	12	12	12	13	14	14	17	17	18	18	18	18	19	19	20	20	20	20	23	24

Source: Soccerway
A = Away; H = Home; W = Win; D = Draw; L = Loss; P = Postponed

==== Score overview ====
Win Draw Loss

Opposition	Home score	Away score	Aggregate score	Double
AFC Leopards	0–2	1-1	1-3	No
Bandari	1-0	0-0	1-0	No
Chemelil Sugar	0-0	0–1	0–1	No
Gor Mahia	1–4	0–2	1-6	No
KCB	0–2	1-1	1-3	No
Mathare United	0-0	1-0	1-0	No
Muhoroni Youth	1–2	0-1	1–3	No
Nakuru All Stars	0-0	1-0	1-0	No
Sofapaka	0-1	2-1	2-2	No
SoNy Sugar	1-1	0-2	1-3	No
Thika United	2-3	1-1	3-4	No
Tusker	0-1	1-1	1-2	No
Ulinzi Stars	0-0	1-1	1-1	No
KRA	0-0	1-3	1-3	No
Western Stima	1-2	1-3	2-5	No

Source: Soccerway

==== Matches ====
Win Draw Loss Fixtures

The league officially kicked off on the 20 February 2014

20 February 2015 1	Gor Mahia	2-0	Nairobi City Stars	Nairobi
15:00 UTC+3	Sserunkuma 7'; Kizito 65'	Report		Stadium: City Stadium

23 February 2014 2	Nairobi City Stars	1-0	Bandari	Nairobi
15:00 UTC+3	Ng'ang'a 71'	Report		Stadium: Hope Centre

2 March 2014 3	KCB FC	1-1	Nairobi City Stars	Nairobi
15:00 UTC+3	Mauda 57'	Report	Abege 60'	Stadium: City Stadium

8 March 2014 4	Nairobi City Stars	0-0	Ulinzi Stars	Nairobi
15:00 UTC+3		Report		Stadium: Hope Centre

16 March 2015 5	Muhoroni Youth	1-0	Nairobi City Stars	Muhoroni
15:00 UTC+3	Otuoma 5'	Report		Stadium: Muhoroni Stadium

23 March 2015 6	Nairobi City Stars	1-1	SoNy Sugar	Nairobi
15:00 UTC+3	Kasadha 37'	Report	Oduor 26' (pen.)	Stadium: Nyayo Stadium

26 March 2015 7	Sofapaka	1-2	Nairobi City Stars	Machakos
15:00 UTC+3	Ndolo 84'	Report	Ng'ang'a 20'; Abege 27'	Stadium: Kenyatta Stadium

9 April 2015 8	Nairobi City Stars	0-0	Chemelil Sugar	Nairobi
15:00 UTC+3		Report		Stadium: Hope Centre

12 April 2015 9	AFC Leopards	1-1	Nairobi City Stars	Mumias
15:00 UTC+3	Saleh 84'	Report	Okoth 52'	Stadium: Mumias Complex

23 April 2015 10	Nairobi City Stars	1-2	KRA	Nairobi
15:00 UTC+3	Bageya 57'	Report	Blaty 32', 79'	Stadium: Hope centre

4 May 2015 11	Nairobi City Stars	0-0	Nakuru All Stars	Nairobi
15:00 UTC+3		Report		Stadium: Nyayo Stadium

11 May 2015 12	Mathare United	1-0	Nairobi City Stars	Nairobi
15:00 UTC+3	Abich 54' (pen.)	Report		Stadium: Kasarani

21 May 2015 13	Nairobi City Stars	0-1	Tusker	Nairobi
15:00 UTC+3		Report	Osumba 5'	Stadium: City Stadium

7 June 2015 14	Thika United	1-1	Nairobi City Stars	Nairobi
15:00 UTC+3	Odhiambo 44' (pen.)	Report	Bageya 15'	Stadium: City Stadium

14 June 2015 15	Nairobi City Stars	1-1	Western Stima	Nairobi
15:00 UTC+3	Kasadha 90'	Report	Kemboi 21'	Stadium: City Stadium

6 July 2015 16	KRA	3-1	Nairobi City Stars	Nairobi
15:00 UTC+3	Kataka 18'; Owino 28'; Hassan 84'	Report	Misiko 16' (o.g.)	Stadium: City Stadium

11 July 2015 17	Chemelil Sugar	0-1	Nairobi City Stars	Chemelil
15:00 UTC+3		Report	Okoth 33'	Stadium: Chemelil Complex

23 July 2015 18	Nairobi City Stars	0-2	AFC Leopards	Nairobi
15:00 UTC+3		Report	Wafula 5'; Uzoromoke 15'	Stadium: Nyayo Stadium

26 July 2015 19	Ulinzi Stars	1-1	Nairobi City Stars	Nakuru
15:00 UTC+3	Waruru 39'	Report	Okoth 24'; Amboko (yellow card) 45'; Marasowe (yellow card) 67'	Stadium: Afraha Stadium

1 August 2015 20	Nairobi City Stars	0-2	KCB FC	Nakuru
16:15 UTC+3		Report	Kassim 7'; Chaka 19'; Musana (red card) 42'	Stadium: Afraha Stadium

9 August 2015 21	Western Stima	1-0	Nairobi City Stars	Mumias
16:15 UTC+3	Omuse 25'	Report	Ogutu (yellow card) 42'	Stadium: Mumias Complex

17 August 2015 22	Nairobi City Stars	2-3	Thika United	Nairobi
16:15 UTC+3	Kabugu 57'; Basweti 77'; Amboko (yellow card) 78'	Report	Odhiambo 9'; Omumbo 20'; Meki 32'	Stadium: Kasarani

23 August 2015 23	Bandari	0-0	Nairobi City Stars	Mombasa
16:15 UTC+3		Report	Kasadha (yellow card) 75'	Stadium: Mombasa Stadium

12 September 2015 24	Nairobi City Stars	0-1	Sofapaka	Mombasa
16:15 UTC+3	Masawa (yellow card) 32'	Report	Miheso 9'; Mutuyimana (yellow card) 27'	Stadium: Mombasa Stadium

19 September 2015 25	Tusker	1-1	Nairobi City Stars	Nairobi
16:15 UTC+3	Aucho 26' (yellow card) 82'; Kevin (yellow card) 37'; Were (yellow card) 58'	Report	Oliech (yellow card) 17'; Okoth (yellow card) 31'; Omondi 71'	Stadium: Ruaraka

4 October 2015 26	Nairobi City Stars	1-4	Gor Mahia	Nairobi
16:15 UTC+3	Marasowe (yellow card) 26' (yellow-red card) 77'; Omondi 82'	Report	Sserunkuma 42', 44' (pen.), 58' (pen.); Odhiambo 45'	Stadium: Nyayo Stadium

19 October 2015 27	SoNy Sugar	2-0	Nairobi City Stars	Awendo
16:15 UTC+3	Onyango 11', 60'	Report		Stadium: Green Stadium

24 October 2015 28	Nairobi City Stars	1-2	Muhoroni Youth	Nairobi
16:15 UTC+3	Abege (yellow card) 20'; Ongwae (yellow card) 44'; Masawa (yellow card) 73'; Okoth 76' (pen.)	Report	Abbas 45+1'; Ateng (yellow card) 70'; Otuoma 80'; Waweru (yellow card) 90'	Stadium: Kasarani Stadium

2 November 2015 29	Nakuru All Stars	0-1	Nairobi City Stars	Nakuru
16:15 UTC+3		Report	Amboko (yellow card) 60'; Abege 80'	Stadium: Afraha Stadium

8 November 2015 30	Nairobi City Stars	0-0	Mathare United	Nairobi
16:15 UTC+3	Simiyu (yellow card) 87'; Ochieng (yellow card) 89'	Report	Syamba (yellow card) 71'	Stadium: Hope Centre

=== GOtv Shield ===
Win Draw Loss Fixtures

2 Jun 2014 Round of 64	Nairobi City Stars	4-0	Modern Coast Rangers	Nairobi
15:00 UTC+3	Oliech 1'; Basweti 13'; Ochieng 37', 45'	Report		Stadium: Ruaraka

9 Jul 2014 Round of 32	Nairobi City Stars	1-2	Wazito	Nairobi
15:00 UTC+3	Oliech 88'	Report	Ndege 80', 86'	Stadium: Rauraka Stadium

== Statistics ==
=== Goalscorers ===
No.	Pos.	Player	Premier League	GOtv Shield	Total
4	MF	(Kenya) Dennis Okoth	3	0	3
17	ST	(Uganda) George Abege	3	0	3
28	MF	(Uganda) Lawrence Kasadha	3	0	3
99	MF	(Kenya) Kevin Ochieng	1	2	3
14	DF	(Kenya) Dennis Ng'ang'a	2	0	2
26	FW	(Kenya) Raymond Omondi	2	0	2
9	ST	(Kenya) Justus Basweti	1	1	2
10	ST	(Kenya) Kevin Oliech	0	2	2
40	ST	(Uganda) Jimmy Bageya	2	0	2
20	DF	(Uganda) Ismail Kabugu	1	0	1
Totals			18	5	23

Source: GSA

=== Top Assists ===
No.	Pos.	Player	Premier League	GOtv Shield	Total
99	MF	(Kenya) Kevin Ochieng	3	0	3
9	ST	(Kenya) Justus Basweti	2	0	2
4	DM	(Kenya) Dennis Okoth	1	0	1
10	ST	(Kenya) Kevin Oliech	1	0	1
11	AM	(Kenya) Oscar Mbugua	1	0	1
12	MF	(Nigeria) Nelson Marasowe	1	0	1
14	DF	(Kenya) Dennis Ng'ang'a	1	0	1
18	DF	(Kenya) Arthur Museve	1	0	1
21	MF	(Kenya) Victor Ashinga	1	0	1
26	FW	(Kenya) Raymond Omondi	1	0	1
Opponent			2	0	3
Missing			3	4	8
Totals			25	7	32

=== Clean sheets ===
Rank	No.	Pos.	Player	Premier League	Betway Cup	Total
1	23	GK	(Kenya) Fredrick Majani	4	0	4
2	1	GK	(Kenya) Kevin Omondi	3	0	3
3	30	GK	(Kenya) Michael Juma	0	0	0
Totals				7	0	7

== Awards ==
=== Players ===
No.	Pos.	Player	Award	Source
1	GK	(Kenya) Kevin Omondi	2014 Young Player of the Year - 1st runners-up	
22	MF	(Kenya) Nicholas Kamau	2014 Young Player of the Year - 2nd runners-up	
