= 2016 Kariobangi Sharks FC season =

Kenyan football club season

Kariobangi Sharks
2016 NSL season
- Owner: Nick Mwendwa
- Chairman: Robert Maoga
- Head coach: William Muluya (June 2016); See managerial changes
- Stadium: Utalii grounds
- Kenyan National Super League: 2nd
- GOtv Shield: 3rd
- Top goalscorer: League: Ibrahim Kitawi (12); All: Ibrahim Kitawi (14)
- Biggest win: 5-2 vs KCB (H), 20 Oct 2016, GOtv Shield Bronze match
- Biggest defeat: 4-1 vs Ulinzi Stars (A), 1 OCt 2016, GOtv Shield semis

The 2016 season was Kariobangi Sharks sixth season in Kenya's second tier league, the Kenyan National Super League, following promotion in the year 2011.

The season marked one of the club's most significant years as the club finished second in the league with 83 points, earning historic promotion to the Kenyan Premier League for the first time ever. The fete was earned on the final day of the season on 9 December 2016.

To setup the Nzoia showdown, Sharks picked up nine straight wins in their preceding games including those against Bidco United and Ligi Ndogo SC but needed an outright win at Sudi to keep Zoo Kericho off the second and last automatic promotion placing.

Against the odds, Sharks' registered a memorable 1–0 away victory over league champions and already promoted Nzoia Sugar at Sudi Stadium to earn the elevation to the top flight. Team skipper Patilah Omoto scored the decisive goal ending Nzoia Sugar's unbeaten home record to secure an automatic promotion.

The promotion campaign started under head coach Michael Amenga, who oversaw the opening ten matches before departing the club in June 2016. He was succeeded by former Mathare United team manager William Kanu Muluya. Under Muluya, Kariobangi Sharks built a 29-match unbeaten league run steadily climbing from sixth to the second spot, and into Kenya's elite league. Result-wise, Sharks had the second best attack and defense scoring 58 goals and conceding only 21 goals in that order.

Ibrahim Kitawi, an attacking midfielder was instrumental throughout the season finishing as the club's leading scorer with 12 league goals after improving on his tally of seven goals scored the previous season. Boniface Akenga, signed from Nakuru AllStars in the offseason, ended up as the second top scorer with 11 goals.

== Technical Bench ==
Position	Staff
Head coach	(Kenya) William Muluya
Assistant head coach	(Kenya) Collins Omondi
Team Manager	(Kenya) Mathew Sam
Goalkeeper Trainer	(Kenya) Sunil Shah

Source: Soka

=== Managerial changes ===
Outgoing head coach	Manner of departure	Incoming head coach	Date of appointment	ref
(Kenya) Michael Amenga	Coaching course	(Kenya) William Muluya	10 June 2016	

== Players ==
As of December 2016.

#	Nat.	Name	Pos.	Date of birth (age)	Signed from
Goalkeepers
1	(Kenya)	Barcky Ochieng	GK		(Kenya)
16	(Kenya)	Malcom Oigo	GK	10 March 1994 (age 32)	(Kenya)
30	(Kenya)	John Oyemba	GK	3 June 1993 (age 33)	(Kenya) Nairobi Stima
Defenders
3	(Kenya)	Pascal Ogweno	CB	14 April 1992 (age 34)	(Kenya)
5	(Kenya)	Eric Juma	RB	14 November 1994 (age 31)	(Kenya)
6	(Kenya)	Geoffrey Shiveka	CB	16 October 1995 (age 30)	(Kenya)
-	(Kenya)	Geoffrey Wangalwa	LB		(Kenya)
11	(Kenya)	Steven Odhiambo	LB	24 February 1989 (age 37)	(Kenya)
15	(Kenya)	Hillary Otieno	RB/CB	26 May 1987 (age 39)	(Kenya)
-	(Kenya)	Cliff Otieno	CB		(Kenya)
22	(Kenya)	Wycliffe Onyango	CB	31 January 1989 (age 37)	(Kenya) Nairobi Stima
Midfielders
	(Kenya)	Michael Omondi (footballer)	DM	26 June 1991 (age 35)	(Kenya)
	(Kenya)	Vincent Wasambo	CM	29 May 2000 (age 26)	(Kenya)
8	(Kenya)	Patilah Omoto (captain)	DM	2 March 1995 (age 31)	(Kenya) Sharks Academy
10	(Uganda)	Mathew Odongo	AM	24 September 1996 (age 29)	(Uganda) SC Victoria University
13	(Kenya)	Christopher Kimathi	CM	25 October 1990 (age 35)	(Kenya) Sharks Academy
-	(Kenya)	Eliakim Nyanga	CM		
-	(Kenya)	Samuel Muringu	FW		
14	(Kenya)	Francis Manoa	CM	15 January 1995 (age 31)	(Kenya)
-	(Kenya)	John Macharia	AM	10 January 1997 (age 29)	(Kenya) Laiser Hill Academy
17	(Kenya)	Ellie Asieche	AM	17 August 1991 (age 35)	(Kenya) KCB
18	(Kenya)	Sven Yida	AM	18 December 1998 (age 27)	(Kenya) Ligi Ndogo
–	(Kenya)	Ibrahim Kitawi	AM	28 December 1988 (age 37)	(Kenya) Bandari FC
20	(Kenya)	Newton Mugo	DM	16 April 1994 (age 32)	(Kenya)
–	(Kenya)	Moses Kamau	AM		(Kenya)
Forwards
9	(Kenya)	Ovella Ochieng	ST	23 December 1999 (age 26)	(Kenya) Upper Hill School
19	(Kenya)	Rodgers Omondi	CF	18 September 1989 (age 37)	(Kenya) FC Talanta
-	(Kenya)	Boniface Akenga	CF	5 May 1995 (age 31)	(Kenya) Nakuru AllStars
Players who left
-	(Kenya)	Dennis Ng'ang'a	LB	5 May 1995 (age 31)	(Kenya) KCB
-	(Kenya)	John Ndirangu	LB	27 September 1995 (age 30)	(Kenya) AFC Leopards
–	(Uganda)	Aziz Kemba	LW	1 January 1992 (age 34)	(Uganda) Edgars FC
–	(Kenya)	Joseph Mwangi	LW	1 January 1992 (age 34)	(Kenya) Chemelil Sugar

Source: Soccerzz

== Transfers ==
=== In ===
Date	Pos.	Player	From	Ref.
17 Dec 2015	LW	(Kenya) John Ndirangu	(Kenya) Nakuru AllStars	
17 Dec 2015	ST	(Kenya) Boniface Akenga	(Kenya) Nakuru AllStars	
18 Dec 2015	LB	(Kenya) Dennis Ng'ang'a	(Kenya) Tusker	
18 Dec 2015	LW	(Uganda) Aziz Kemba	(Kenya) Tusker	
18 Dec 2015	GK	(Kenya) Paul Odhiambo	(Kenya) Kakamega Homeboyz	
18 Dec 2015	AM	(Uganda) Ellie Asieche	(Uganda) KCB	
18 Dec 2015	LW	(Kenya) Kenneth Wendo	(Kenya) AFC Leopards	
18 Dec 2015	LW	(Kenya) Ovella Ochieng	(Kenya) Upper Hill School	
18 Dec 2015	LW	(Uganda) Mathew Odongo	(Uganda) SC Victoria University	

=== Out ===
Date	Pos.	Player	To	Ref.
1 Jan 2016	MF	(Kenya) James Orundu	(Kenya) MOSCA	

=== In ===
Date	Pos.	Player	From	Ref.
23 Jun 2016	FW	(Kenya) John Macharia	(Kenya) Laiser Hill School	
23 Jun 2016	FW	(Kenya) Kelvin Kanyungo	(Kenya)	
23 Jun 2016	DM	(Kenya) Sven Yida	(Kenya) Ligi Ndogo	

=== Out ===
Date	Pos.	Player	To	Ref.
22 June 2016	LW	(Uganda) Aziz Kemba	(Uganda) Edgards FC	
22 June 2016	LB	(Kenya) Dennis Ng'ang'a	(Kenya) KCB (loan)	
1 Jul 2016	LW	(Kenya) Joseph Mwangi	(Kenya) Chemelil Sugar	
1 Jul 2016	FW	(Kenya) John Ndirangu	(Kenya) AFC Leopards	

== Competitions ==
=== Overall record ===
Competition	First match	Last match	Starting round	Final position	Record							
Competition	First match	Last match	Starting round	Final position	Pld	W	D	L	GF	GA	GD	Win %
2016 NSL	10 Mar 2016	09 Dec 2016	Matchday 1	2nd	38	24	11	3	58	21	+37	63.16
2016 GOtv Shield	26 Jun 2016	20 Oct 2016	Round of 64	3/4 playoff	6	5	0	1	14	11	+3	83.33
Total					44	29	11	4	72	32	+40	65.91

Source: WhoScored

=== Super League ===
==== Results summary ====
Overall								Home						Away					
Pld	W	D	L	GF	GA	GD	Pts	W	D	L	GF	GA	GD	W	D	L	GF	GA	GD
38	24	11	3	58	21	+37	83	13	4	2	36	11	+25	11	7	1	22	10	+12

Source: WhoScored

==== Results by round ====
Round	1	2	3	4	5	6	7	8	9	10	11	12	13	14	15	16	17	18	19	20	21	22	23	24	25	26	27	28	29	30	31	32	33	34	35	36	37	38
Ground	H	A	H	A	H	A	A	H	A	H	A	H	A	H	A	H	H	A	H	A	H	A	H	A	H	H	A	H	A	H	A	H	A	H	A	A	H	A
Result	W	w	L	D	L	D	W	W	L	W	W	D	W	D	W	D	D	W	D	W	D	W	W	W	W	W	D	D	D	W	W	W	W	W	W	W	W	W
Position	1	1	3	6	10	9	6	4	5	5	5	6	5	7	5	6	7	5	6	4	5	4	4	3	3	3	3	3	3	3	3	3	3	3	3	2	2	2
Points	3	6	6	7	7	8	11	14	14	17	20	21	24	25	28	29	30	33	34	37	38	41	44	47	50	53	54	55	56	59	62	65	68	71	74	77	80	83

Source: WhoScored
A = Away; H = Home; W = Win; D = Draw; L = Loss; P = Postponed

==== Score overview ====
Win Draw Loss

Opposition	Home score	Away score	Aggregate score	Double
Agro Chem	1-0	3-2	4-2	Yes
Bidco Utd	2-1	2-0	4-1	Yes
KCB	1-0	1-2	2-2	No
Kenya Police	2-0	2-1	4-1	Yes
Ligi Ndogo	1-0	1-1	2-1	No
Modern Coast	3-0	2-1	5-1	Yes
MOYAS	3-0	1-1	4-1	No
Nairobi Stima	1-1	2-0	2-1	No
Nakumatt	1-1	0-0	1-1	No
Nakuru All Stars	3-0	2-1	5-1	Yes
Nzoia Sugar	1-3	1-0	2-3	No
Oserian	0-0	1-0	1-0	No
Palos	1-0	0-0	1-0	No
Shabana	3-0	0-0	3-0	No
St. Joseph's	5-0	1-0	6-0	Yes
Talanta	2-1	0-0	2-1	No
Vihiga United	2-1	1-1	3-2	No
Wazito	1-1	2-1	3-2	No
Zoo FC	3-0	0-1	3-1	No

==== Matches ====
Win Draw Loss Fixtures

The 2016 Kenyan National Super League season began on 19 March and ended on 10 December.

19 March 2016 1	Kariobangi Sharks	3-0	MOYAS	Nairobi
15:00 UTC+3	Odongo 35', 86'; Akenga 39'	Report		Stadium: Camp Toyoyo

23 March 2016 2	Kenya Police	1-2	Kariobangi Sharks	Nairobi
15:00 UTC+3	Mageson 15'	Report	Okiki 47' (o.g.); Akenga 86'

26 March 2016 3	Kariobangi Sharks	1-2	KCB	Nairobi
15:00 UTC+3	Omuse 6', 22'	Report	Shiveka 86' (pen.)	Stadium: Camp Toyoyo

3 April 2016 4	Ligi Ndogo	1-1	Kariobangi Sharks	Nairobi
15:00 UTC+3	Kagogo 40'	Report	Akenga 75'	Stadium: Ligi Grounds

6 April 2016 5	Kariobangi Sharks	1-3	Nzoia United	Nairobi
15:00 UTC+3	Omondi 77'	Report	Namanda 10'; Masuta 46'; Juma 90'	Stadium: Camp Toyoyo

10 April 2016 6	Nakumatt	1-1	Kariobangi Sharks	Nairobi
15:00 UTC+3	Dunga 36'	Report	Akenga 65'

16 April 2016 7	Wazito	1-2	Kariobangi Sharks	Nairobi
15:00 UTC+3	Kilonzo 31'	Report	Ovella 24'; Shiveka 84' (pen.)

23 April 2016 8	Kariobangi Sharks	2-1	Vihiga United	Nairobi
15:00 UTC+3	Akenga 80'; Kitawi 82'	Report	Kigadi 65'	Stadium: Camp Toyoyo

27 April 2016 9	Zoo FC	1-0	Kariobangi Sharks	Kericho
15:00 UTC+3	Madoya 70'	Report		Stadium: Green Stadium

2 May 2016 10	Modern Coast	1–2	Kariobangi Sharks	Mombasa
15:00 UTC+3	Karuri 52'	Report	Akenga 25'; Ovella 50'	Stadium: Mbaraki

8 May 2021 11	Nakuru All Stars	1-2	Kariobangi Sharks	Nakuru
15:00 UTC+3	Ochino 13'	Report	Omoto 39'; Ovella 54'	Stadium: Afraha Stadium

15 May 2016 12	Kariobangi Sharks	1-1	Nairobi Stima	Nairobi
15:00 UTC+3	Kitawi 68'	Report	Musamalai 25'	Stadium: Camp Toyoyo

22 May 2016 13	Kariobangi Sharks	0-2	St. Joseph's	Nairobi
15:00 UTC+3	Asieche 47', 56'; Akenga 53', 76', 80'	Report		Stadium: Camp Toyoyo

28 May 2016 14	FC Talanta	0-0	Kariobangi Sharks	Nairobi
15:00 UTC+3		Report

1 June 2016 15	Kariobangi Sharks	1-0	Agro Chem	Nairobi
15:00 UTC+3	Mugo 60' (pen.)	Report		Stadium: Camp Toyoyo

9 July 2016 16	Shabana FC	0-0	Kariobangi Sharks	Kisii
15:00 UTC+3		Report		Stadium: Gusii Stadium

17 July 2016 17	Oserian FC	0-0	Kariobangi Sharks	Naivasha
15:00 UTC+3		Report		Stadium: Oserian Stadium

24 July 2021 18	Kariobangi Sharks	2-1	Bidco United	Nairobi
15:00 UTC+3	Asieche 34'; Odongo 55'	Report	Njoroge 71'	Stadium: Camp Toyoyo

8 August 2016 19	Palos FC	0-0	Kariobangi Sharks	Kisumu
15:00 UTC+3		Report

14 August 2016 20	St. Joseph's	0-1	Kariobangi Sharks	Nakuru
15:00 UTC+3		Report	Akenga 75'	Stadium: Afraha Stadium

3 September 2016 21	MOSCA FC	1-1	Kariobangi Sharks	Nairobi
15:00 UTC+3	Nambute 82'	Report	Yida 42'

7 September 2016 22	Kariobangi Sharks	2-1	FC Talanta	Nairobi
15:00 UTC+3	Kitawi 19', 90'	Report	Kwena 28'	Stadium: Camp Toyoyo

10 September 2016 23	Kariobangi Sharks	3-0	Zoo FC	Nairobi
15:00 UTC+3	Omondi 23'; Ogweno 56'; Odongo 75'	Report		Stadium: Camp Toyoy

25 September 2016 24	Kariobangi Sharks	2-0	Kenya Police	Nairobi
15:00 UTC+3	Ogweno (35)); Ndungu 68'	Report		Stadium: Camp Toyoyo

5 October 2016 25	KCB	0-1	Kariobangi Sharks	Nairobi
15:00 UTC+3			Wasambo 55'

8 October 2016 26	Kariobangi Sharks	3-0	Modern Coast	Nairobi
15:00 UTC+3	Kitawi 67', 75'; Macharia 90'	Report		Stadium: Camp Toyoyo

12 October 2016 27	Vihiga United	1-1	Kariobangi Sharks
15:00 UTC+3	Masinza 40'	Report	Asieche 72'

16 October 2016 28	Kariobangi Sharks	1-1	Wazito	Nairobi
15:00 UTC+3	Akenga 25'	Report	Waithera 32'	Stadium: Camp Toyoyo

24 October 2016 29	Nakumatt	0-0	Kariobangi Sharks	Nairobi
15:00 UTC+3		Report

30 October 2016 30	Kariobangi Sharks	3-0	Nakuru All Stars	Nairobi
15:00 UTC+3	Ovella 5'; Juma 48'; Kitawi 55'	Report		Stadium: Camp Toyoyo

5 November 2016 31	Nairobi Stima	0-2	Kariobangi Sharks	Nairobi
15:00 UTC+3		Report	Kitawi 30', 55' (pen.)	Stadium: Camp Toyoyo

5 November 2016 32	Kariobangi Sharks	3-0	Shabana FC	Nairobi
15:00 UTC+3	Omoto 5'; Kitawi 45'; Odongo 46'	Report		Stadium: Camp Toyoyo

9 November 2016 33	Agro Chem	2-3	Kariobangi Sharks
15:00 UTC+3	Onyango 18'; Omondi 90'	Report	Kitawi 25', 49'; Kamau 85'

13 November 2016 34	Oserian FC	0-1	Kariiobangi Sharks	Naivasha
15:00 UTC+3		Report	Odongo 68'	Stadium: Oserian Stadium

20 November 2016 35	Kariobangi Sharks	1-0	Palos	Nairobi
15:00 UTC+3	Omondi 50'	Report		Stadium: Camp Toyoyo

26 November 2016 36	Bidco United	0-2	Kariobangi Sharks	Thika
15:00 UTC+3		Report	Kitawi 30', 55' (pen.)	Stadium: Thika Stadium

3 December 2016 37	Kariobangi Sharks	1-0	Ligi Ndogo	Nairobi
15:00 UTC+3	Kitawi 80'	Report		Stadium: Camp Toyoyo

9 December 2016 38	Nzoia United FC	0-1	Kariobangi Sharks	Bungoma
15:00 UTC+3		Report	Omoto 25'	Stadium: Sudi Stadium

=== GOtv Shield ===
Win Draw Loss Fixtures

26 Jun 2016 Round of 64	Nairobi Water	1-3	Kariobangi Sharks
15:00 UTC+3

29 Jul 2016 Round of 32	Kariobangi Sharks	2(5)-2(4)	Palos FC
15:00 UTC+3	Shiveka 35'; Omondi 60'	Report	Mugisha 7', 75'

28 Aug 2016 Round of 16	Modern Coast	0-1	Kariobangi Sharks	Mombasa
15:00 UTC+3		Report	Kitawi 48'	Stadium: Mbaraki Sports Ground

18 Sep 2016 Qtrs	Kariobangi Sharks	1(4)-1(3)	Bandari	Nairobi
15:00 UTC+3	Omondi 49'	Report	Mudde 61'	Stadium: Nyayo Stadium

10 Oct 2016 Semis	Ulinzi Stars	4-1	Kariobangi Sharks	Nakuru
15:00 UTC+3	Wamalwa 5' Makwatta 57', 59', 76'	Report	Odhiambo 84'	Stadium: Afraha Stadium

20 Oct 2016 Bronze final	KCB	2-5	Kariobangi Sharks	Nairobi
15:00 UTC+3	Kamau 10'; Omuse 75'		Omondi 20'; Omoto 51'; Kitawi (yellow card) 54'; Juma 59'; Odhiambo 67', 74'	Stadium: Ruaraka

== Statistics ==
=== Goalscorers ===
No.	Pos.	Player	Premier League	GOtv Shield	Total
-	AM	(Kenya) Ibrahim Kitawi	15	2	17
-	FW	(Kenya) Boniface Akenga	11	0	11
10	AM	(Uganda) Mathew Odongo	6	0	6
19	FW	(Kenya) Rodgers Omondi	3	3	6
9	FW	(Kenya) Ovella Ochieng	4	0	4
17	AM	(Kenya) Ellie Asieche	4	0	4
8	DM	(Kenya) Patilah Omoto	3	1	4
-	LB	(Kenya) Stephen Odhiambo	0	3	3
6	CB	(Kenya) Geoffrey Shiveka	2	1	3
3	DF	(Kenya) Pascal Ogweno	2	0	2
5	DF	(Kenya) Eric Juma	1	1	2
-	MF	(Kenya) Moses Kamau	1	0	1
	FW	(Kenya) John Macharia	1	0	1
18	DM	(Kenya) Sven Yida	1	0	1
	DM	(Kenya) Newton Mugo	1	0	1
	MF	(Kenya) Vincent Wasambo	1	0	1
	MF	(Kenya) Kevin Ndungu	1	0	1
Own goals			1	0	1
Missing			0	3	3
Totals			58	13	71
