= Muhammad (surname) =

Muhammad and variants may be surnames with spellings identical to the variants of the given name Muhammad. Notable people with the surnamerrs include:

== Mahomed ==
- Dean Mahomed (1759–1851), British Indian traveller, soldier, surgeon, and entrepreneur
- Osman Mahomed, Mauritian politician

== Mohamad ==
- Mahathir Mohamad (born 1925), Malaysian politician; Prime Minister of Malaysia (1981–2003; 2018–2020)

== Mohamed ==
- Abdulrahman Mohamed (disambiguation), various people
- Ahmed Mohamed (disambiguation), various people
- Amin Mohammed (born 1996), known online as Chunkz, British YouTube personality
- Amina Mohamed (born 1961), Somali lawyer, diplomat and politician
- Antonio Mohamed (born 1970), Argentine football coach
- Binyam Mohamed (born 1978), Ethiopian detained in Guantanamo Bay between 2004 and 2009
- Che Zahara binte Noor Mohamed (1907–1962), Malay activist
- Dimitri Mohamed (born 1989), French footballer
- Hassan Mohamed (disambiguation), various people
- Ismail Mohamed (born 1980), Maldivian footballer
- Kassim Mohamed, Kenyan Canadian
- Magid Mohamed (born 1985), Qatari footballer
- Mandy Mohamed (born 2000), Dutch-Egyptian artistic gymnast
- Mike Mohamed (born 1988), American football player
- Mohamed Mohamed (disambiguation), various people
- Mohd Mohamed (born 1982), Qatari basketball player
- Mostafa Mohamed (disambiguation), various people
- Nadifa Mohamed (born 1981), Somali-British novelist
- Nazar Mohamed Kassim, Singaporean convicted killer
- Pops Mohamed (1949–2025), South African multi-instrumentalist, jazz musician and producer
- Richalda Mohamed (born 2002), Comorian athlete
- Saad Kassis-Mohamed (born 2001), Zimbabwean-Indian human rights defender and philanthropist
- Shakeel Mohamed (born 1968), Mauritanian politician
- Souad Kassim Mohamed (born 1976), Djiboutian linguist, scholar and playwright

== Mohammad ==
- Mahmoud Mohammad Issa Mohammad, Palestinian member of the Popular Front for the Liberation of Palestine
- Wazir Mohammad (1929–2025), Pakistani cricketer and banker

== Mohammed ==
- Murtala Mohammed, Nigerian general who served as military dictator from 1975 to 1976
- Adam Mohammed (born 2006), American football player
- Amina J. Mohammed, 5th and current Deputy Secretary-General of the United Nations
- Bala Mohammed, Nigerian politician and Governor of Bauchi State
- Boonaa Mohammed, Canadian spoken-word poet
- Fazeer Mohammed, Trinidadian cricket commentator
- Ferdoos Mohammed, Egyptian actress
- Ghulam Mohammed, Indian politician and former member of the Uttar Pradesh Legislative Assembly
- Jawar Mohammed, Ethiopian political analyst and activist
- Sidi Mohammed, 17th century Hadiya state leader
- Kausar Mohammed, American actress and comedian
- Khaled Mohammed, Qatari football player
- Khaleel Mohammed, Guyanese-American academic
- Khalid Sheikh Mohammed, Pakistani Islamist militant
- Lai Mohammed, Nigerian politician and Minister of Information and Culture
- Mesud Mohammed, Ethiopian professional footballer
- Mohammed Taher Mohammed, Iraqi weightlifter
- Musa Mohammed (footballer) (born 1991), Kenyan football player
- Nazr Mohammed, American retired basketball player
- Nick Mohammed, British actor, comedian, and writer
- Nick Mohammed (wrestler), Canadian wrestler
- Rajaa Mohammed, Kuwaiti actress
- Ramzi Mohammed, Somali national convicted of involvement in the attempted London bombing of 21 July 2005
- Shaffaq Mohammed, British politician and Member of the European Parliament
- Shamaa Mohammed, Omani television actress
- Sohail Mohammed, American judge
- Syed Mohammed, Indian cricketer
- Terique Mohammed, Canadian soccer player
- Wasiru Mohammed, Ghanaian professional boxer
- Yanar Mohammed (1960–2026), Iraqi feminist and women's rights activist
- Zehn Mohammed, English football player

== Muhammad ==
- Al-Quadin Muhammad (born 1995), American football player
- Asia Muhammad (born 1991), American tennis player
- Belal Muhammad, American-born Palestinian mixed martial artist
- Belal Muhammad (activist) (1936–2013), one of the founders of the Swadhin Bangla Betar Kendra
- Clara Muhammad, born Clara Evans, wife of Nation of Islam leader Elijah Muhammad
- Elijah Muhammad (1897–1975), born Elijah Poole, African American religious leader
- Idris Muhammad, born Leo Morris, American musician
- Ivette Muhammad, American politician
- John Allen Muhammad (born John Allen Williams; 1960–2009), American serial/spree killer and one of the two D.C. Snipers
- Khalfani Muhammad (born 1994), American football player
- Kiara Muhammad (born 1998), American actress
- Malik Muhammad (born 2004), American football player
- Muhsin Muhammad, American football player
- Rasheed Muhammad, Pakistani tissue seller and murderer
- Ruby Muhammad, American centenarian
- Shabazz Muhammad (born 1993), American basketball player
- Umar Muhammad (born 1975), American football player

== Muhammed ==
- Ibrahim Murtala Muhammed (1974–2025), Ghanaian politician
