= 2018–19 Nairobi City Stars season =

Kenyan football club season

Nairobi City Stars
2018-19 NSL season
- Owner: Jonathan Jackson Foundation
- Chairman: Jonathan Jackson
- Head coach: John Amboko (April 2019); See managerial changes
- Stadium: Hope Centre
- Kenyan National Super League: 14th
- Top goalscorer: League: Noah Abich (8); All: Noah Abich (8)
- Biggest win: 3-1 vs Shabana FC (H), 20 Mar 2019, NSL
- Biggest defeat: 1-5 vs Eldoret Youth (H), 14 De 2018, NSL

The 2018–19 season was Nairobi City Stars's 16th season since the club's establishment in 2003 and the third consecutive campaign in the Kenyan National Super League following relegation from the Kenyan Premier League at the end of the 2016 season.

It was Nairobi City Stars' first season in the newly aligned Football Kenya Federation Kenya National Super League calendar following the federation's transition from a single-year season to the European-style football calendar in conformity with a CAF directive. The campaign commenced in December 2018 and concluded in June 2019.

The season began under long-serving club figure John Amboko who served as head coach during the entire 2018 Kenya National Super League season after taking over from Ugandan Abdul Semadu, continued offering his services into the new campaign. In January 2019, Amboko dropped down to become an assistant coach after the appointment of Ugandan tactician Jimmy Kintu as head coach.

Following the club's acquisition by the Jonathan Jackson Foundation in April 2019, Kintu departed the club and Amboko was elevated back to head coach. Unfortunately, a fracas in Naivasha during a match against Kenya Police on 17 April 2019 left Amboko suspended for the rest of the season leaving the club with no option but to turn to assistant coach Tiellen Oguta. The club boosted the bench with Ligi Ndogo Technical Director Vladimir, a Serbian, who arrived alongside former Kenya international James Omondi, to collectively oversee the final games of the season. JJF's entry also marked the return of Neville Pudo as team manager.

The team endured a poor start to the season posting just one win, eight draws and a record eleven losses in the first 20 games including handing Modern Coast its first season win on matchday seven. Nairobi City Stars however finished 14th in the 19-team league with 39 points, comfortably avoiding relegation after a significant improvement in form during the closing stages of the campaign that included three straight wins over Kangemi All Stars, Migori Youth and Kibera Black stars.

The turnaround coincided with the club's acquisition by the Jonathan Jackson Foundation (JJF) in April 2019, which ushered in new investment and restructuring both on and off the field. JJF's takeover also marked the arrival of Patrick Korir as the chief executive officer taking over the roles of club secretary Herbert Kunga.

Mid-season signings played a pivotal role in the club's resurgence. Six players were brought in the mid transfer widow including former Sony Sugar defender Noah Abich who finished as the club's leading scorer with eight league goals. His long range freekick against Kangemi All Stars at Camp Toyoyo, Jericho, in the third last game of the season guaranteed a 2–1 win, and survival in the league for another season. Returning Gambian striker Ebrimah Sanneh added seven goals after rejoining the club during the second half of the season. The two arrived alongside former player David Gateri, Paul Okatwa, Heritier Luvualu and keeper Vincent Khatili who acted as a plug in for Ronny Kagunzi who, alongside coach Amboko and defender Augustine Ochieng, were suspended for the season. At the end of this season, defender Arthur Museve called it a day after close to 12 seasons with a cameo appearance in the season final against Kibera Black Stars at Hope Centre.

== Technical Bench ==
Position	Staff
Head coach	(Kenya) John Amboko
Assistant head coach	(Kenya) Tiellen Oguta
Goalkeeper coach	(Kenya) Zachary Onyango
Team manager	(Kenya) Neville Pudo
Team Physio	(Kenya) Dennis Mugisa
Kit Manager	(Kenya) Joseph Andere

Source: Nairobi City Stars

=== Managerial changes ===
Outgoing head coach	Manner of departure	Incoming head coach	Date of appointment	ref
(Kenya) John Amboko	Demoted	(Uganda) Jimmy Kintu	28 January 2019	
(Uganda) Jimmy Kintu	Replaced	(Kenya) John Amboko	24 March 2019	
(Serbia) John Amboko	Suspended by FKF	(Kenya) Tiellen Oguta	25 Apr 2019	

=== In ===
Date	Pos.	Player	From	Ref.
6 Apr 2019	GK	(Kenya) Vincent Khatili	(Kenya) Vapor Sports (loan)	
6 Apr 2019	ST	(The Gambia) Ebrimah Sanneh	(Kenya) Kariobangi Sharks	
6 Apr 2019	RB	(Kenya) Noah Abich	Mt. Kenya United	
6 Apr 2019	FW	(Kenya) David Gateri	Mt. Kenya United	
6 Apr 2019	FW	(Kenya) Paul Okatwa	Mt. Kenya United	
6 Apr 2019	CM	(Democratic Republic of the Congo) Heritier Luvualu		

=== Out ===
Date	Pos.	Player	To	Ref.
1 Mar 2019	MF	(Ivory Coast) Joel Djolo	(Kenya) Shabana FC	
1 Mar 2019	ST	(Ivory Coast) Alex Yoroga	Free agents	
1 Mar 2019	GK	(Kenya) Fernandez Mutsotso	Free agents	
1 Mar 2019	FW	(Kenya) Eric Simidi	Free agents	
1 Mar 2019	ST	(Liberia) Roosevelt Blatty	Free agents	
1 Mar 2019	MF	(Kenya) Michael Muchai	Free agents	

== Competitions ==
=== Overall record ===
Competition	First match	Last match	Starting round	Final position	Record							
Competition	First match	Last match	Starting round	Final position	Pld	W	D	L	GF	GA	GD	Win %
2018-19 NSL	1 Dec 2018	9 Jun 2019	Matchday 1	14th	38	8	15	15	47	60	−13	21.05
Total					38	8	15	15	47	60	−13	21.05

Source: GSA

=== Super League ===
==== Results summary ====
Overall								Home						Away					
Pld	W	D	L	GF	GA	GD	Pts	W	D	L	GF	GA	GD	W	D	L	GF	GA	GD
38	8	15	15	47	60	−13	39	5	6	8	24	29	−5	3	9	7	23	31	−8

Source: GSA

==== Results by round ====
Round	1	2	3	4	5	6	7	8	9	10	11	12	13	14	15	16	17	18	19	20	21	22	23	24	25	26	27	28	29	30	31	32	33	34	35	36	37	38
Ground	H	A	H	A	H	A	A	H	A	H	A	H	A	H	A	H	H	A	H	A	H	A	H	A	H	H	A	H	A	H	A	H	A	H	A	A	H	A
Result	L	L	L	D	D	D	L	D	D	W	D	D	D	L	L	L	L	L	L	L	W	L	D	D	W	W	L	D	W	D	D	L	D	L	D	W	W	W
Position																															17	17	17	16	16	15	15	14
Points	0	0	0	1	2	3	3	4	5	8	9	10	11	11	11	11	11	11	11	11	14	14	15	16	19	22	22	23	26	27	28	28	29	29	30	33	36	39

Source: GSA
A = Away; H = Home; W = Win; D = Draw; L = Loss; P = Postponed

==== Score overview ====
Win Draw Loss

Opposition	Home score	Away score	Aggregate score	Double
Admin Police	1-1	2-2	3-3	No
Bidco United	0-0	1-1	1-1	No
Coast Stima	2-1	2-2	4-3	No
Eldoret Youth	1-5	0-1	1-6	No
Fortune Sacco	4-4	2-2	6-6	No
Green Commandoes	2-1	2-1	4-2	Yes
Kangemi All Stars	1-2	2-1	3-3	No
Kenya Police	1-1	0-2	1-3	No
Kibera Black Stars	2-1	1-3	3-4	No
Kisumu All Stars	1-1	1-1	2-2	No
Modern Coast Rangers	2-1	1-3	3-4	No
Migori Youth	2-0	0-1	2-1	No
Nairobi Stima	0-1	1-1	1-2	No
Shabana	3-1	0-1	3-2	No
St. Joseph's	2-3	1-2	3-5	No
Talanta	1-2	1-1	2-3	No
Thika United	1-1	1-1	2-2	No
Ushuru	1-2	2-2	3-4	No
Wazito	0-2	2-3	2-5	No

Source: GSA

==== Matches ====
Win Draw Loss Fixtures

The league officially kicked off on the 1st of December 2018

2 December 2018 1	Nairobi City Stars	0-2	Wazito	Nairobi
15:00 UTC+3		Report		Stadium: Hope Centre

9 December 2018 2	Shabana	1-0	Nairobi City Stars	Kisii
15:00 UTC+3	Oketch (?)	Report		Stadium: Gusii Stadium

14 December 2018 3	Nairobi City Stars	1-5	Eldoret Youth	Nairobi
15:00 UTC+3	Iregi 54'	Report		Stadium: Camp Toyoyo

19 December 2018 4	Bidco United	1-1	Nairobi City Stars	Thika
15:00 UTC+3		Report	Wainaina 90+1'	Stadium: Thika Stadium

23 December 2018 5	Nairobi City Stars	1-1	Kisumu All Stars	Nairobi
15:00 UTC+3	Katumba 71'	Report		Stadium: Ruaraka

5 January 2019 6	Coast Stima	2-2	Nairobi City Stars	Mombasa
15:00 UTC+3		Report	Chale 72' (pen.); Katumba 81'	Stadium: Mbaraki Sports Club

11 January 2019 7	Modern Coast	3-1	Nairobi City Stars	Mombasa
15:00 UTC+3	Ouma 25'; Ocholla 46', 67'	Report	Yoroga 69' (pen.)	Stadium: Serani Sports Club

16 January 2019 8	Nairobi City Stars	1-1	Kenya Police	Nairobi
15:00 UTC+3	Katumba 12'	Report	Dawo (?)	Stadium: Camp Toyoyo

20 January 2019 9	Fortune Sacco	2-2	Nairobi City Stars	Thika
15:00 UTC+3		Report	Yoroga 35'; Blaty 53'	Stadium: Thika Stadium

26 January 2019 10	Nairobi City Stars	1-0	Green Commandoes	Nairobi
15:00 UTC+3	Museve 40'	Report		Stadium: Camp Toyoyo

30 January 2019 11	Thika United	1-1	Nairobi City Stars	Thika
15:00 UTC+3		Report	Katumba 58'	Stadium: Thika Stadium

4 February 2019 12	Nairobi City Stars	1-1	Admin Police	Nairobi
15:00 UTC+3	Agesa 32'	Report		Stadium: Camp Toyoyo

9 February 2019 13	Nairobi Stima	1-1	Nairobi City Stars	Naivasha
15:00 UTC+3		Report	Blaty 66'	Stadium: Karuturi

13 February 2019 14	Nairobi City Stars	1-2	FC Talanta	Nairobi
15:00 UTC+3	Katumba 80'	Report	Karuri 39'; Owino 89'	Stadium: Camp Toyoyo

18 February 2019 15	St. Joseph's Youth	2-1	Nairobi City Stars	Nakuru
15:00 UTC+3		Report	Shikanda 27'	Stadium: Afraha Stadium

22 February 2019 16	Nairobi City Stars	0-2	Ushuru	Nairobi
15:00 UTC+3		Report		Stadium: Camp Toyoyo

27 February 2019 17	Nairobi City Stars	1-2	Kangemi All Stars	Nairobi
15:00 UTC+3	Maloba 9'	Report		Stadium: Camp Toyoyo

3 March 2019 18	Migori Youth FC	1-0	Nairobi City Stars	Awendo
15:00 UTC+3		Report		Stadium: Awendo Stadium

8 March 2019 19	Nairobi City Stars	1-3	Kibera Black Stars	Nairobi
15:00 UTC+3	Chale 35'	Report	Baraza (?); Masaba (?)	Stadium: Camp Toyoyo

13 March 2019 20	Wazito	3-2	Nairobi City Stars	Nairobi
15:00 UTC+3	Anekeya 40'; Waithera 65', 89'	Report	Iregi 23'; Ndung'u 48'	Stadium: Camp Toyoyo

20 March 2019 21	Nairobi City Stars	3-1	Shabana FC	Nairobi
15:00 UTC+3	Iregi 17'; Ndung'u 72'; Agesa 82'	Report	Iregi 23'; Ndung'u 48'	Stadium: Camp Toyoyo

24 March 2019 22	Eldoret Youth FC	1-0	Nairobi City Stars	Eldoret
15:00 UTC+3	Lisamula 72' (pen.)	Report		Stadium: ASK Showground

28 March 2019 23	Nairobi City Stars	0-0	Bidco United	Nairobi
15:00 UTC+3		Report		Stadium: Camp Toyoyo

3 April 2019 24	Kisumu All Stars	1-1	Nairobi City Stars	Kisumu
15:00 UTC+3	Motanda (?)	Report	Wainaina 16'	Stadium: Moi Stadium

7 April 2019 25	Nairobi City Stars	2-1	Coast Stima	Nairobi
15:00 UTC+3	Sanneh 16', 71'	Report	Oyoo 46'	Stadium: Camp Toyoyo

12 April 2019 26	Nairobi City Stars	2-1	Modern Coast Rangers	Nairobi
15:00 UTC+3	Museve 5'; Abich 90' (pen.)	Report		Stadium: Hope Centre

17 April 2019 27	Kenya Police	2-0 (Awd)	Nairobi City Stars	Naivasha
15:00 UTC+3		Report		Stadium: Karuturi Grounds

21 April 2019 28	Nairobi City Stars	4-4	Fortune Sacco	Nairobi
15:00 UTC+3	Abich 14' (pen.), 83' (pen.); Sanneh 46', 48'	Report		Stadium: Camp Toyoyo

27 April 2019 29	Green Commandoes	1-2	Nairobi City Stars	Nairobi
15:00 UTC+3	Magambi 65'	Report	Sanneh 55'; Chumsy 80'	Stadium: Bukhungu Stadium

1 May 2019 30	Nairobi City Stars	1-1	Thika United	Nairobi
15:00 UTC+3	Luvualu 26'	Report	Tubuka 39'	Stadium: Camp Toyoyo

6 May 2019 31	Admin Police	2-2	Nairobi City Stars	Nairobi
15:00 UTC+3	Luvualu 78'; Sanneh 90+2'	Report	Alemba 19'; Riro 84'	Stadium: Camp Toyoyo

11 May 2019 32	Nairobi City Stars	0-1	Nairobi Stima	Nairobi
15:00 UTC+3	Chumsy (red card) ?'	Report	Mandela 56' (pen.)	Stadium: Hope Centre

18 May 2019 33	FC Talanta	1-1	Nairobi City Stars	Nairobi
15:00 UTC+3		Report	Abich 83' (pen.)	Stadium: Camp Toyoyo

22 May 2019 34	Nairobi City Stars	2-3	St. Joseph's Youth	Nairobi
15:00 UTC+3	Kariuki 11'; Abich 17' (pen.)	Report	Odunga (yellow card) 32' (yellow-red card) 65'	Stadium: Camp Toyoyo

27 May 2019 35	Ushuru	2-2	Nairobi City Stars	Nairobi
15:00 UTC+3	Yakhama 5'; Barrack 83'	Report	Abich 22' (pen.), 32' (pen.)	Stadium: Ruaraka

1 June 2019 36	Kangemi All Stars	1-2	Nairobi City Stars	Nairobi
15:00 UTC+3	Atse 9'	Report	Ndung'u 30'; Abich 80'	Stadium: Ruaraka

5 June 2019 37	Nairobi City Stars	2-0	Migori Youth	Nairobi
15:00 UTC+3	Wainaina 7'; Atudo 33'	Report		Stadium: Hope Centre

9 June 2019 38	Kibera Black Stars	1-2	Nairobi City Stars	Nairobi
15:00 UTC+3		Report	Sanneh 34'; Agesa 45'	Stadium: Hope Centre

== Statistics ==
=== Goalscorers ===
No.	Pos.	Player	Premier League	FKF Cup	Total
	RB	(Kenya) Noah Abich	8	0	8
29	ST	(The Gambia) Ebrimah Sanneh	7	0	7
	ST	(Uganda) Sande Katumba	5	0	5
7	FW	(Kenya) Benson Iregi	3	0	3
11	FW	(Kenya) Davis Agesa	3	0	3
	FW	(Kenya) Robert Ndung'u	3	0	3
	MF	(Kenya) Peter Wainaina	3	0	3
	MF	(Kenya) Charles Otieno	2	0	2
	FW	(Democratic Republic of the Congo) Heritier Luvualu	2	0	2
	ST	(Liberia) Roosevelt Blaty	2	0	2
18	DF	(Kenya) Arthur Museve	2	0	2
	FW	(Ivory Coast) Alex Yoroga	2	0	2
21	MF	(Kenya) Oliver Maloba	1	0	1
	MF	(Kenya) Idd Shikanda	1	0	1
	RB	(Kenya) Kevin Okumu	1	0	1
	MF	(Kenya) Joseph Kariuki	1	0	1
	CB	(Kenya) Jaswell Ngugi	1	0	1
Own goals			0	0	0
Totals			47	0	47

=== Clean sheets ===
Rank	No.	Pos.	Player	Premier League	FKF Cup	Total
1		GK	(Kenya) Ronny Kagunzi	2	0	2
2		GK	(Kenya) Vincent Khatili	1	0	1
3		GK	(Kenya) Evans Liseche	0	0	0
Players who left the club
4		GK	(Kenya) Fernandez Mutsotso	0	0	0
Totals				3	0	3

=== Discipline ===
No.	Pos.	Player	Premier League			FKF Cup			Total		
No.	Pos.	Player	Booked	(yellow card) (yellow-red card)	Sent off (straight red)	Booked	(yellow card) (yellow-red card)	Sent off (straight red)	Booked	(yellow card) (yellow-red card)	Sent off (straight red)
	GK	(Kenya) Ronny Kagunzi	1	0	1	0	0	0	1	0	1
	GK	(Kenya) Vincent Khatili	1	0	0	0	0	0	1	0	0
	DM	(Kenya) Charles Otieno	8	0	1	0	0	0	1	0	1
	CB	(Kenya) Jaswell Ngugi	6	0	0	0	0	0	6	0	0
	CB	(Kenya) Austine Ochieng	5	0	1	0	0	0	5	0	1
18	CB	(Kenya) Arthur Museve	4	0	0	0	0	0	4	0	0
7	FW	(Kenya) Rodgers Ochieng	1	0	0	0	0	0	1	0	0
8	LB	(Kenya) Calvin Masawa	1	0	0	0	0	0	1	0	0
	FW	(Kenya) Davis Agesa	5	0	0	0	0	0	5	0	0
	LB	(Kenya) Derrick Wafula	1	0	0	0	0	0	1	0	0
	MF	(Kenya) Joel Djolo	2	0	0	0	0	0	2	0	0
	MF	(Kenya) Joseph Kariuki	2	0	0	0	0	0	2	0	0
28	RB	(Kenya) Kevin Okumu	7	1	1	0	0	0	7	1	1
	FW	(Kenya) Kevin Ouma	3	0	0	0	0	0	3	0	0
17	RB	(Kenya) Noah Abich	1	0	0	0	0	0	1	0	0
21	AM	(Kenya) Oliver Maloba	1	0	0	0	0	0	1	0	0
	ST	(Liberia) Roosevelt Blaty	1	0	0	0	0	0	1	0	0
29	DF	(The Gambia) Ebrimah Sanneh	1	0	0	0	0	0	1	0	0
	DM	(Kenya) Victor Okullu	4	0	0	0	0	0	4	0	0
	MF	(Kenya) Peter Mwangi	2	0	1	0	0	0	2	0	1
	DM	(Kenya) Victor Okullu	4	0	0	0	0	0	4	0	0
	FW	(Kenya) Robert Ndung'u	3	0	0	0	0	0	3	0	0
Totals			60	3	5	0	0	0	60	3	5
