= Hit for Six (film) =

2007 film

Hit for Six is a 2007 Barbadian sports drama film starring Andrew Pilgrim and Rudolph Walker. A West Indian cricket player, once accused of match fixing, fights to play in an international tournament and earn the respect of his estranged father, a former player.

The film also included West Indies cricket team players Tino Best, Philo Wallace, Everton Weekes, Wes Hall, Desmond Haynes, Gordon Greenidge, England cricket player Roland Butcher, Television cricket commentators Tony Cozier and Fazeer Mohammed.

== Notes ==
- Barbados cricket film hit for six, BBC News, Friday, 20 April 2007, 15:50 GMT 16:50 UK
