= Mostafa Mohamed =

Mostafa Mohamed may refer to:

- Mostafa Mohamed (footballer), Egyptian football forward
- Mostafa Mohamed (militant), Egyptian-Australian member of Jabhat al-Nusra
- Mostafa Mohamed (wrestler), Egyptian-Greco-Roman wrestler
- Mustafa Mohamed, Somali-Swedish athlete
- Mustafa Mohammed, Iraqi footballer
- Mustafa Mohammad, Jordanian bodybuilder

== See also ==
- Mustafa Mohamed Moalim, Somali pilot
- Mostafa Mohammad-Najjar, Iranian politician
- Mustafa Mohamed Fadhil, Al-Qaeda operative
- Mustapa Mohamed, Malaysia politician
- Mohammad Mustafa (disambiguation)
