= Mohammad Mustafa =

Mohammad Mustafa may refer to:

- Mohamed Musthaffa (1952–2023), Sri Lankan politician
- Mohammad Mustafa, one of the names used to refer to the Islamic prophet Muhammad
- Mohammad Mustafa (politician) (born 1954), Prime Minister of Palestine
- Mohammad Mustafa (footballer, born 1989), Jordanian footballer
- Mohammad Mustafa (footballer, born 2000), Iraqi footballer
- Mohammad Musthafa Shaik aka Mohammad Mustafa, Andhra Pradesh politician of India
- Mohammad Mustafa (alias), the purported Norwegian author of a controversial 1987 letter, the Mustafa Letter
- Mohamed Mustafa (footballer, born 1996), Sudanese footballer
- Muhammad Mustafá Baghdádí, Iraqi adherent of the Baháʼí faith
- Mustafa Mohammed, Iraqi footballer
- Muhamad Mustafa, Mayalsian politician

== See also ==
- Mostafa Mohamed (disambiguation)
- Muhammad (disambiguation)
- Mustafa (disambiguation)
