= Bukom Boxing Arena =

Multipurpose arena in Bukom, Accra, Ghana

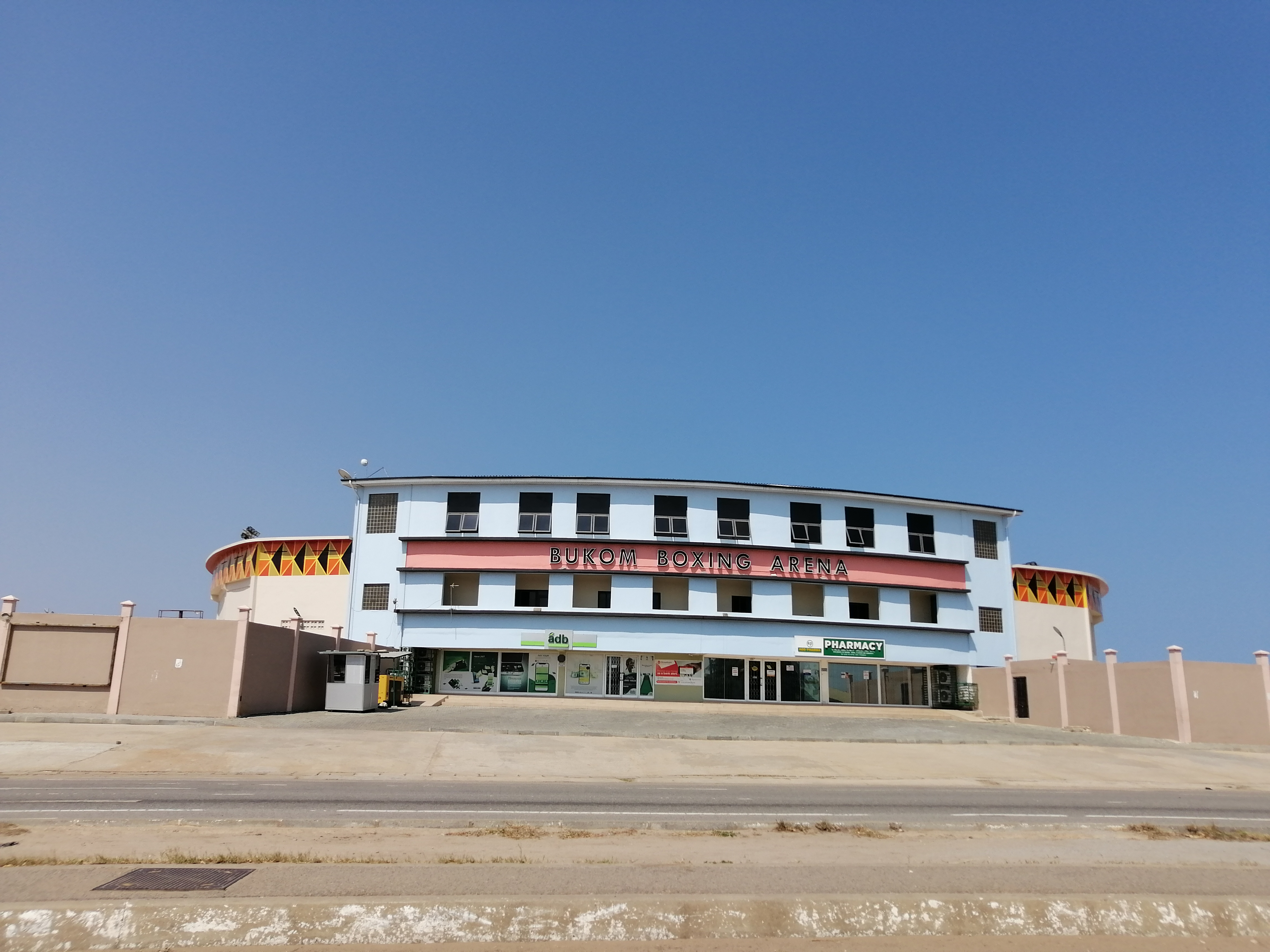
- Interactive map of Bukom Boxing Arena
- Location: Accra, Ghana
- Coordinates: 5.5367439°N 0.2212454°W
- Capacity: 4,000

Construction
- Opened: 2016

Bukom Boxing Arena is the first boxing arena to be built in Ghana. The multipurpose facility was commissioned by John Dramani Mahama in November 2016 and has a seating capacity of 4,000. Other facilities in the open-air edifice include a sports hall, Aerobic centre, Olympic size swimming pool and conference hall. The arena was constructed in Bukom due to the numerous world boxing champions the community has produced. Apart from boxing, the arena hosts basketball tournaments. The arena is adorned with the names of Ghanaian world boxing champions and otherwise famous Ghanaian boxers, such as Azumah Nelson, Ike Quartey, D.K. Poison, Abigail Kwartekaa Quartey and others.

== Funding ==
The arena was funded by Social Security and National Insurance Trust (SSNIT) in partnership with a Polish company, ETC Group Polska in their joint venture company Trust Sports Emporium Limited.

== Crime scene ==
In October 2018 the arena was declared a crime scene after fans reacted violently to referee Adorn Bertin's decision to end a bout between Isaac Sackey and Wasiru Mohammed. Bertin called a halt to the contest after defending WBO Africa super-bantamweight champion Sackey was knocked down by Mohammed in the third round. Although Sackey was able to return to his feet, Bertin waved off the fight, awarding Mohammed the WBO title via knockout.

== Notable fights ==
The boxing competitions of the 2023 African Games were held at the arena.

On 24 November 2024, Abigail Quartey faced British boxer Sangeeta Birdi for the vacant WIBF World Super Bantamweight title at the arena. Quartey won by unanimous decision, making her the first Ghanaian woman to hold a world boxing title.
