= 2018 Intercontinental Cup (India) =

International football tournament

2018 Hero Intercontinental Cup
Tournament details
- Host country: India
- City: Mumbai
- Dates: 1–10 June 2018
- Teams: 4 (from 3 confederations)
- Venue: 1 (in 1 host city)

Final positions
- Champions: India (1st title)
- Runners-up: Kenya
- Third place: New Zealand
- Fourth place: Chinese Taipei

Tournament statistics
- Matches played: 7
- Goals scored: 21 (3 per match)
- Attendance: 27,399 (3,914 per match)
- Top scorer: (India) Sunil Chhetri (8 goals)
- Best player: (India) Sunil Chhetri

The 2018 Intercontinental Cup (known as the 2018 Hero Intercontinental Cup for sponsorship reasons) was a 4-nations football tournament held at the Mumbai Football Arena in the Indian city of Mumbai between 1 and 10 June 2018. The tournament was organized by the AIFF as part of the senior men's team's preparation for 2019 AFC Asian Cup. The tournament succeeded the Nehru Cup and developed post the Tri-Nation Series, where the then India head coach Stephen Constantine revealed that the intention was to hold a four-team tournament with India competing against teams from the Caribbean, Africa, and Asia. India won the tournament by defeating Kenya 2–0 in the final on 10 June 2018.

== Participating nations ==
The FIFA Rankings, as of 1 June 2018:

- ~~South Africa~~ (72)
- India (97) - first appearance - host
- Kenya (112) - first appearance
- New Zealand (120) - first appearance
- Chinese Taipei (121) - first appearance

Initially, South Africa was announced to participate in the tournament but Kenya later replaced them when South Africa expressed its inability to participate. The other two nations participated in the tournament were Chinese Taipei from AFC region and New Zealand from the OFC region.

== Venue ==
- All matches held at the Mumbai Football Arena, Mumbai, India.

Mumbai	2018 Intercontinental Cup (India) is located in India
Mumbai Football Arena	2018 Intercontinental Cup (India) is located in India
19°07′23.2″N 72°50′12.8″E	2018 Intercontinental Cup (India) is located in India
Capacity: 6,600 seats	2018 Intercontinental Cup (India) is located in India

== Group stage ==
Pos	Team	Pld	W	D	L	GF	GA	GD	Pts	
1	India (H)	3	2	0	1	9	2	+7	6	Advance to the Final
2	Kenya	3	2	0	1	6	4	+2	6	Advance to the Final
3	New Zealand	3	2	0	1	4	3	+1	6	Third Place
4	Chinese Taipei	3	0	0	3	0	10	−10	0	Fourth Place

Source: Soccerway
Rules for classification: 1) points; 2) goal difference; 3) head-to-head match result
(H) Hosts
1 June 2018
20:00

India	5–0	Chinese Taipei
Chhetri 14', 34', 62'; U. Singh 48'; Halder 78'	Report

Mumbai Football Arena, Mumbai
Attendance: 2,569
Referee: Nivon Robesh Gamini (Sri Lanka)
2 June 2018
20:00

Kenya	2–1	New Zealand
Miheso 45'; Ochieng 69'	Report	Singh 42'

Mumbai Football Arena, Mumbai
Attendance: 150
Referee: Santhosh Kumar (India)

4 June 2018
20:00

India	3–0	Kenya
Chhetri 68' (pen.), 90+2'; Lalpekhlua 71'	Report

Mumbai Football Arena, Mumbai
Attendance: 8,890
Referee: Hettikamkanamge Perera (Sri Lanka)
5 June 2018
20:00

Chinese Taipei	0–1	New Zealand
	Report	Bevan 36' (pen.)

Mumbai Football Arena, Mumbai
Attendance: 150
Referee: C. R. Srikrishna (India)

7 June 2018
20:00

India	1–2	New Zealand
Chhetri 47'	Report	De Jong 49'; Dyer 86'

Mumbai Football Arena, Mumbai
Attendance: 6,600
Referee: Hettikamkanamge Perera (Sri Lanka)
8 June 2018
20:00

Chinese Taipei	0–4	Kenya
	Report	Odhiambo 52'; Atudo 55' (pen.), 88'; Otieno 70'

Mumbai Football Arena, Mumbai
Attendance: 150
Referee: Santhosh Kumar (India)

== Final ==
10 June 2018
20:00 IST

India	2–0	Kenya
Chhetri 8', 29'	Report

Mumbai Football Arena, Mumbai
Attendance: 8,890
Referee: Nivon Robesh Gamini (Sri Lanka)

== Winners ==
2018 Intercontinental Cup champion

India
First title

== Crowd attendance ==
After a poor attendance of 2,569 for the first match of the tournament, Indian captain Sunil Chhetri uploaded a video on his Twitter and Instagram accounts pleading for Indians to attend Indian football matches. Chhetri's plea was endorsed by other sports people, including Indian cricket captain Virat Kohli, cricket legend Sachin Tendulkar, and tennis player Sania Mirza. People responded to the plea by booking tickets for India's upcoming game against Kenya, and the game was sold out before the match day. The match was Chhetri's 100th cap for India in which he scored a brace, leading India to win 3–0. The tweet was the most retweeted tweet in 2018, per Twitter India and was awarded The Golden Tweet.

== Broadcasting rights ==
Star Sports did broadcast for the 2018 Intercontinental Cup (India) on Star Sports HD2 & Star Sports 2. It was also streamed live on Hotstar and Jio TV.

== Goalscorers ==
8 goals

- (India) Sunil Chhetri

2 goals

- (Kenya) Jockins Atudo

1 goal

- (New Zealand) Andre De Jong
- (Kenya) Clifton Miheso
- (Kenya) Dennis Odhiambo
- (New Zealand) Myer Bevan
- (New Zealand) Moses Dyer
- (India) Jeje Lalpekhlua
- (Kenya) Ovella Ochieng
- (India) Pronay Halder
- (New Zealand) Sarpreet Singh
- (Kenya) Timothy Otieno
- (India) Udanta Singh

== See also ==
- Intercontinental Cup (India)
