= Abigail Kwartekaa Quartey =

Ghanaian professional boxer

Personal information
- Born: Abigail Kwartekaa Quartey Jamestown, Accra, Ghana
- Weight: Super bantamweight

Boxing career
- Stance: Orthodox

Abigail Kwartekaa Quartey is a Ghanaian professional boxer who became the first female world boxing champion from Ghana. On 18 November 2024, she defeated British boxer Sangeeta Birdi to win the WIBF World Super Bantamweight title at the Bukom Boxing Arena in Accra.

== Career ==
Quartey grew up in Jamestown, Accra, a neighborhood known for producing many of Ghana’s top boxers. She began boxing with the encouragement of her brother and coach but paused her career in 2017 due to financial constraints. She returned to the sport in 2021 and rose quickly through the ranks.

On 24 November 2024, Quartey faced British boxer Sangeeta Birdi for the vacant WIBF World Super Bantamweight title. The fight, held at Accra’s Bukom Boxing Arena, ended with Quartey winning by unanimous decision, making her the first Ghanaian woman to hold a world boxing title.

== Significance ==
Quartey’s victory was hailed as a breakthrough moment for women’s sports in Ghana, inspiring young female athletes and challenging traditional gender norms in boxing.
