= Raquib Milanzi =

Malawian footballer (born 1986)

Raquib Lulu Milanzi (born 27 April 1986) is a Malawian former footballer who played as a midfielder. He turned out for Zimbabwe Premier Soccer League club Caps United between 2009 and 2010, Kenyan Premier League sides Tusker F.C. and Nairobi City Stars between 2013 and 2014, and Super League of Malawi sides CIVO United, Be Forward, Nyasa Big Bullets as well as Mighty Wanderers.

Milanzi joined Tusker FC midway through the 2013 season after successful trials to become one of the few Malawian players competing in Kenyas topflight League. In November 2013, he scored his first league goal for Tusker in a 3–2 defeat to Sony Sugar at Nyayo National Stadium.

After a short stint at Tusker Milanzi joined Nairobi City Stars as Nigerian coach Robinson Ndubuisi rebuilt a squad for the season but only lasted half a season. He later joined Mighty Wanderers in Malawi and years later turned out for Ntopwa FC.

Prior to arriving in Kenya, Milanzi is recorded to have tried his luck in Mozambique, and after his Kenyan stint he was in the news over a possible move to a South African club.
