= Ellie Asieche =

Kenyan footballer (born 1991)

Ellie Asieche Sekah (born 17 August 1991) is a Kenyan professional midfielder who featured for Kenyan Premier League sides KCB, Kariobangi Sharks, Mathare United, Sofapaka FC and Wazito FC.

== Career ==
Asieche featured for Sofapaka for a number of seasons before joining KCB for the 2015 season. In 2016 he crossed over to Sharks with who he spent two seasons before returning for another stint at Sofapaka in 2018.

He left Sofapaka after three seasons to join Wazito. then sampled football outside Nairobi with Western based Kakamega Homeboyz before returning to Nairobi to join Mathare United.

== International career ==
Earlier in his career he was a member of the Kenya U20 team but always harbored ambitions of making it to the senior national team.

== External references ==
- Ellie Asieche@GSA*
