= Patilah Omoto =

Kenyan footballer (born 1995)

Personal information
- Date of birth: 2 March 1995 (age 31)
- Position: Midfielder

Team information
- Current team: Kariobangi Sharks

Senior career*
Years	Team	Apps	(Gls)
2012	Kariobangi Sharks		
2013	A.F.C. Leopards		
2014	Bandari		
2015–	Kariobangi Sharks		

International career^{‡}
2012–	Kenya	13	(0)
- * Club domestic league appearances and goals as of 12:51, 9 October 2018 (UTC) ‡ National team caps and goals as of 12:51, 9 October 2018 (UTC)

Patilah Omoto (born 2 March 1995) is a Kenyan international footballer who plays for Kariobangi Sharks, as a midfielder.

== Career ==
He has played club football for Kariobangi Sharks, A.F.C. Leopards and Bandari.

He made his international debut for Kenya in 2012.
