= Vincent Wasambo =

Kenyan footballer (born 2000)

Vincent Wasambo aka "Crucial" (born 29 May 2000) is a Kenyan professional midfielder who featured for Kenyan Premier League sides Kariobangi Sharks, KCB and Posta Rangers.

== Career ==
Wasambo's football kicked off at the MYSA where he turned out for several youth sides before joining Sharks in 2015. He was part of the elites that promoted the team at the end of the 2015 season to the Kenyan top flight. He was to stay on at the team till the year 2020.He later joined KCB in November 2020 before moving to Posta Rangers.

== International career ==
Wasambo has featured for the Kenya U20, Kenya U23 and the Kenya National team sides. He earned his senior cap against Taiwan on 8 June 2018.

== External references ==
- Vincent Wasambo at National Football Teams
- Vincent Wasambo at FootballCritic
