= Kevin Ochieng =

Kenyan footballer (born 1985)

Personal information
- Full name: Kevin Ochieng Opondo
- Date of birth: 5 October 1985 (age 41)
- Place of birth: Kajiado, Kenya
- Height: 1.73 m (5 ft 8 in)
- Position: Midfielder

Senior career*
Years	Team	Apps	(Gls)
2002–2007	Mathare United		
2007–2008	Al-Shabab SC (Seeb)		
2008–2009	Mathare United		
2010	Sofapaka		
2011	Gor Mahia		
2011	Posta Rangers		
2012	Gor Mahia		
2013	Mathare United		
2014–2015	Nairobi City Stars		

International career
2007–2012	Kenya	25	(2)
- * Club domestic league appearances and goals

Kevin Ochieng Opondo (born 5 October 1985) is a Kenyan former footballer who played as a midfielder.

== Career ==
Born in Kajiado, Ochieng played club football for Mathare United, Al-Shabab SC (Seeb), Sofapaka, Gor Mahia, Posta Rangers and Nairobi City Stars.

He earned 25 caps for the Kenyan national team, scoring twice.
