= George Midenyo =

Kenyan footballer (born 1981)

George Midenyo Oguk
Personal information
- Full name: George Midenyo Oguk
- Date of birth: 21 August 1981 (age 45)
- Place of birth: Nairobi, Kenya
- Height: 1.73 m (5 ft 8 in)
- Position: Striker

Senior career*
Years	Team	Apps	(Gls)
2000–2006	Mathare United		
2006–2007	Tusker		
2007	Raufoss IL		
2007	Mjölby AI FF	9	(0)
2011	Husqvarna FF	15	(2)
2010	Mjölby AI FF		
2011	Tusker	22	(7)
2012	Gor Mahia	12	(2)
2014	Nairobi City Stars	4	(0)
2014–2016	Sidama Coffee S.C.		
2024–	Wazito F.C.		

International career^{‡}
2010	Kenya	10	(0)

Managerial career
- 2017–2018: Wazito F.C. (assistant)
- 2021–2022: Mathare United (assistant)
- 2024–: Mara Sugar FC (Manager)
- * Club domestic league appearances and goals as of 19:31, 27 Apr 2022 (UTC) ‡ National team caps and goals as of 19:31, 27 Apr 2022 (UTC)

George Midenyo Oguk, (born 21 August 1981) is a Kenyan football manager and former player. He had stints at various Kenya Premier league clubs and in Norway, Sweden & Ethiopia during his playing career. He is currently the head coach of Kenya Premier league team Mara Sugar Fc.

Born in Nairobi, Kenya. He featured professionally for Norwegian side Raufoss IL, Swedish sides Mjölby AI FF and Husqvarna FF, and Sidama Coffee S.C. in Ethiopia.

== Club career ==
Midenyo started his career at Mathare United in 2002 and after five seasons joined Tusker F.C. for a season. He then moved to Norwegian side Raufoss IL in 2007 then to Swedish side Mjölby AI FF the same year. In 2008 he joined Husqvarna FF and spent two seasons before returning to Mjölby AI FF.

In 2011 he was back from Scandinavia and rejoined Tusker F.C. In 2012 he joined Gor Mahia F.C. for two seasons then landed at Nairobi City Stars for the 2014 season.

Thereafter, he moved to Sidama Coffee S.C. for two seasons before returning to Kenya to join Wazito F.C. in the second tier.

== Managerial career ==
After half a season at Wazito F.C., Midenyo switched to the bench to become an assistant coach and served for a season and a half.

After coaching private entities and schools, Midenyo was back to coaching at club level. This included Mt. Kenya United in the second tier and Mathare United in the Kenyan topflight.

He currently holds a CAF 'A' coaching licence.

Midenyo was appointed to take charge of newly promoted Kenya premier league side Mara Sugar Fc in August 2024. He began his return to top flight coaching with a 3–0 win over Kakamega Homeboyz at the Awendo Green Stadium.

== International ==
Midenyo was called up to the Kenya national football team in 2010 by head coach Reinhard Fabisch. He earned his debut on 5 Jan 2001 in a friendly against Zambia at the City Stadium.

His competitive debut was away to Gabon during a 2002 AFCON Qualifier Group 3 in Stade Omar Bongo. He played the full 90 minutes.

He went on to earn 10 National caps which included five games in 2001 CECAFA Cup.

== Career statistics ==
=== International ===
As of 27 April 2022

Kenya
Year	Apps	Goals
2001	10	0
Total	10	0

== Honours ==
=== Club ===
Mathare United

- Moi Golden Cup: (2001)

Tusker

- Kenyan Premier League title:(2006/7)
- Kenyan Premier League title:(2011)

Gor Mahia

- 2012 KPL Top 8 Cup
