= Geoffrey Shiveka =

Kenyan footballer (born 1995)

Geoffrey Shiveka Lemu (born 16 October 1995) is a Kenyan professional footballer who plays as a defender. He featured for several teams in the Kenya including Kenyan Premier League sides Kariobangi sharks and Posta Rangers.

== Career ==
Shiveka formerly turned out for premier league side Mathare United while on loan from Kariobangi Sharks in the year 2013 before returning to his parent club and eventually earning promotion to the Kenyan Premier League in 2017. He stayed on with the side through to the end of the 2021/22 season before moving on to Posta.

== International career ==
Shiveka featured for the Kenya U20 side in the year 2012, and has made the list of the senior Kenya team, Harambee Stars.

== External references ==
- Geoffrey Shiveka@Flashscore*
