= Tiellen Oguta =

Kenyan footballer and manager

Personal information
- Full name: Tiellen Robby Oyuko Oguta
- Date of birth: 27 September 1978 (age 48)
- Place of birth: Homa Bay, Kenya
- Positions: Midfielder; left-back

Senior career*
Years	Team	Apps	(Gls)
1998–1999	Gor Mahia Nairobi		
2000–2001	Drita Gjilan		
2001–2002	Besiana Podujeva		
2002–2003	club in Yugoslavia		
2003–2005	Kenya Pipeline Nairobi		
2006–2008	SoNy Sugar Awendo		

International career
1996–1999	Kenya	13	(0)

Managerial career
- 2014: Kenya Revenue Authority (ass´t)
- * Club domestic league appearances and goals

Tiellen Oguta is a Kenyan football manager and former player. He currently works coaching children's soccer part-time in Calgary, Alberta, Canada.

== Club career ==
Oguta played in Kenyan capital Nairobi side Gor Mahia until 1999. In the turn of the century, he moved to Kosovo, which had just become a UN protectorate a year prior after a NATO war against FR Yugoslavia (Serbia), and signed with FC Drita, thus becoming the first ever person of color to play in Kosovo. He later moved to KF Besiana where he won the Kosovar championship, Kosovar Cup and Kosovar Super Cup, all in one year. He used to play in Kosovo as left-back.

In summer 2003, President's Cup defending champions, Kenya Pipeline, signed former Yugoslavia-based defender, Tiellen Oguta.

== International career ==
Ogutu started appearing in the Kenyan national team still in the 1990s. He made 13 appearances between 1996 and 1999.

== Coaching career ==
By 2014 he was assistant manager at Kenya Revenue Authority.

== Honours ==
Besiana

- Kosovar Superliga: 2001–02
- Kosovar Cup: 2002
- Kosovar Super Cup: 2002
