= Paul Okatwa =

Kenyan football manager (born 1992)

Paul Okatwa Odhiambo
Personal information
- Full name: Paul Okatwa Odhiambo
- Date of birth: 24 January 1992 (age 34)
- Height: 1.75 m (5 ft 9 in)
- Position: Striker

Senior career*
Years	Team	Apps	(Gls)
2010-2011	A.F.C. Leopards	18	(0)
2012	Oserian F.C.	11	(2)
2012	Posta Rangers	8	(0)
2013	Kakamega Homeboyz	12	(3)
2013-2014	Gor Mahia F.C.	7	(0)
2014	→ Western Stima (loan)	26	(3)
2015	Ushuru F.C.	1	(0)
2015-2016	Muhoroni Youth F.C.	14	(0)
2016-2017	Sofapaka	27	(4)
2017-18	Tusker F.C.	17	(0)
2018	Posta Rangers	7	(0)
2018-19	Mt. Kenya United	9	(0)
2019	Nairobi City Stars	7	(0)
2020-21	FC Talanta	5	(0)

Managerial career
- 2021-22: Kangemi All Stars (Head Coach)
- 2022-23: Nairobi United (Head Coach)
- * Club domestic league appearances and goals

Paul Okatwa Odhiambo is a former Kenyan striker who until recently was the head coach at Kenyan National Super League side Nairobi United.

Okwatwa was often referred to as a journeyman having turned out for eleven Kenyan Premier League clubs between the years 2010 and 2019. The list includes A.F.C. Leopards, Oserian F.C.,Posta Rangers, Kakamega Homeboyz, Gor Mahia F.C.,Western Stima, Ushuru F.C., Muhoroni Youth F.C., Sofapaka, Tusker F.C. and Mt. Kenya United.

== Playing career ==
Okatwa started his top-flight journey as a teenager at A.F.C. Leopards but after two of three seasons was released. At the start of the 2012 season, Okatwa moved to Naivasha-based Oserian F.C. where he lasted six months before joining Posta Rangers for the rest of the year.

At the beginning of the 2013 season, Okatwa moved to the newly promoted premiership side Kakamega Homeboyz but mid-season he was back in Nairobi to join Gor Mahia F.C. For the 2014 season, he was sent to Western Stima on a season-long deal.

In 2015 he joined Ushuru F.C. but quit after a less than three months. In June he switched to Muhoroni Youth for the remainder of the season. He was released by the club in March 2016 with three months left on his contract.

He joined Sofapaka in June 2016 and after a year he joined Tusker F.C. in June 2017 on a three-year deal. In June 2018, Okwatwa returned to Posta Rangers after six years on a three-year deal but only lasted five months till November of that year. He then opted to join his final top-flight workstation Nakumatt FC.

After years in the Premier League, Okatwa stepped down to join Nairobi City Stars in the second tier in April 2019 for a two-month stint till the end of the 2018–19 season. Thereafter, and after some time out due to injury, he joined another second-tier side FC Talanta in 2020.

== Coaching career ==
In July 2021, he started his coaching journey after joining relegation-threatened Kangemi All-Stars while in the Kenyan third-tier league. He called it a day from the club after losing a promotion play-off from the Kenyan third tier to the second tier to Kona Rangers.

He later took over as head coach of another third-tier side Nairobi United whom he promoted after winning a playoff 1–0 over Zoo FC from Kericho. In December 2023, Okatwa parted ways with the club.
