= Kevin Oliech =

Kenyan professional footballer

Kevin Oliech Opiyo (24 December 1986 – 16 August 2020) was a Kenyan professional footballer who played as a forward. During his career, he featured for several clubs in the Kenyan Premier League, including Mathare United, Nairobi City Stars, Tusker FC, Ushuru FC, Thika United, and Securicor FC. He also featured for the Kenya national football team earning six caps.

In 2012 Oliech and countryman Kevin Kimani had a trial with German side Alemannia Aachen.

Oliech was born on 24 December 1986 in Nairobi, Kenya, into a family closely associated with football. His siblings included celebrated Dennis Oliech, Andrew Oyombe, Ken Oliech who were all Kenyan internationals, and Nixon Onywanda. He died on 16 August 2020 in Berlin, Germany, at the age of 33 while undergoing treatment for cancer.
