= Lawrence Kasadha =

Ugandan footballer (born 1994)

Personal information
- Date of birth: 14 July 1994 (age 32)
- Height: 1.87 m (6 ft 2 in)
- Position: Defender

Youth career
- 2011: Jinja Municipal Council Hippos FC

Senior career*
| Years | Team | Apps | (Gls) |
| 2012 | SC Villa | | |
| 2012-2013 | SC Victoria University | | |
| 2014 | Nairobi City Stars | 18 | (3) |
| 2015 | Bandari F.C. (Kenya) | 17 | (2) |
| 2016-2017 | KCCA | | |
| 2018 | Tusker F.C. | 5 | (0) |
| 2020 | Gaddafi FC | | |
| 2022 | Bul FC | | |

International career^{‡}
| 2012- | Uganda | 5 | (0) |
- * Club domestic league appearances and goals as of 19:31, 2 May 2022 (UTC) ‡ National team caps and goals as of 19:31, 2 May 2022 (UTC)

Lawrence Kenneth Kasadha (born 14 July 1994) is a Ugandan football defender who plays for Ugandan Premier League side Bul FC.

He previously played in the same league for SC Villa, SC Victoria University, KCCA and lower-tier side c and Kenyan Premier League sides Nairobi City Stars, Bandari F.C. (Kenya) and Tusker F.C.

== Club career ==
Kasadha started out at lower-tier side Jinja Municipal Council Hippos FC in 2011 before joining SC Villa in the Ugandan Premier League at the start of year 2012. After six months, midway through the 2012, he was signed by SC Victoria University.

He then moved to Kenya to join Nairobi City Stars for the 2014 season and at the end of the season he headed Coast to sign for Bandari F.C. (Kenya) for the 2015 season amidst news that he had another premiership side Ushuru F.C.

He was back to Uganda in 2016 joining KCCA but was back in Kenya for the 2018 season with Tusker F.C.

He was released by Tusker after just six months and he returned to Uganda and went on to join Gaddafi FC who earned promotion to the Ugandan top flight at the end of the 2020–21 season, then his current station Bul FC.

== International career ==
Kasadha formerly played for Uganda U20 side and has been capped five times for the Uganda national team.

== Honours ==
Victoria University

- Ugandan Cup: 2012–13

Bandari

- 2015 FKF President's Cup

Kampala Capital City Authority

- 2016–17 Uganda Super League

Gaddafi

- FUFA Big League: 2020–21
