= Raymond Omondi =

Kenyan footballer (born 1990)

Raymond Omondi Ochieng (born 31 December 1990) is a Kenyan footballer who played as a striker across several Kenyan Premier League clubs including Nairobi City Stars, Thika United and A.F.C. Leopards, SoNy Sugar and Posta Rangers.

== Club career ==
Omondi began his premier league journey at Nairobi City Stars in 2013 and after a season and a half he moved to Thika United during the 2014 mid transfer window.

From Thika he went abroad to complete his education in the United Kingdom and after, from June 2017, Omondi returned to Kenyan football and signed a two-year contract with A.F.C. Leopards. He is recorded as having scored his only two goals at the club in ten appearances via a brace in a 3–1 away win over Zoo Kericho in September 2017

He later went on to feature for SoNy Sugar, and Posta Rangers before venturing into coaching.
