= Andrew Ongwae =

Kenyan footballer (born 1988)

Andrew Mark Ongwae (born 12 February 1988) is a Kenyan football coach and former footballer who, during his playing days, featured for Kenyan Premier League sides Nairobi City Stars, Shabana, Gor Mahia, Congo United, and Zoo Kericho FC, among others, as a defender.

After retiring from playing, he moved into coaching and has served in technical roles at lower tier sides Gucha FC,, Sony Sugar, Samwest Black Boots FC, Darajani Gogo before moving to premiership side Shabana F.C. in January 2026 first as an assistant, then as the interim coach.
