= Abu Sulayman al-Muhajir =

Mostafa Farag (born 14 February 1984, Port Said, Egypt), known as Sheikh Abu Sulayman al-Muhajir is an Egyptian-born Australian Muslim who is from Sydney's southern suburbs now living in Syria. He used to be part of Jabhat al-Nusra. and left them publicly in 2016. He was recently removed from UN and US sanction lists on 24 August 2026 Removal of US Sanctions

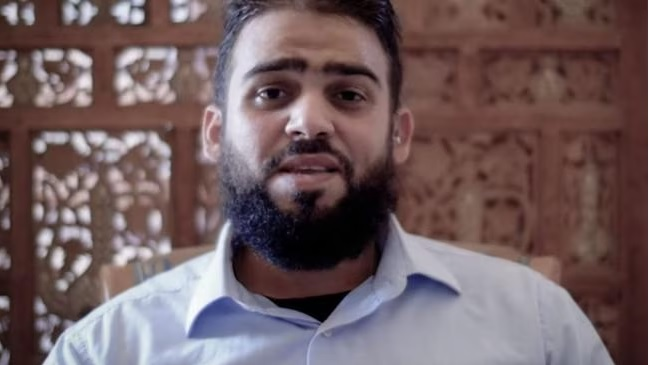

== Biography ==
=== Early life ===
Abu Sulayman was born in Egypt and migrated with his family to Australia soon after his birth. In 1985, he was granted an Australian passport. He was raised in Sydney's southern suburbs and was reportedly the only Muslim at his primary school.

Abu Sulayman reportedly was devoted to Islam from early in his life and set up the first students' Islamic society at his school.

=== Move to Syria ===
Abu Sulayman arrived in Syria in late 2012 and soon after was appointed as one of the most senior religious scholars within Jabhat al-Nusra. He then publicly left all roles from Jabhat al-Nusra and ended any association he had with them.

Due to his very active and public countering of the ideology and political posture of Islamic State (ISIS), Abu Sulayman had many threats. Including - according to The Australian - Abu Sulayman was threatened by Australian Jihadist Khaled Sharrouf.

=== US sanctions ===
In May 2016, the United States declared Abu Sulayman a "Specially Designated Global Terrorist” due to his senior status with Jabhat al-Nusra.

On 24 August, as part of the United States' removal of Jabhat al-Nusra as a terrorist group from Syrian sanctions, the US also removed Abu Sulayman from its sanction list Removal of US Sanctions
