= Ovella Ochieng =

Kenyan footballer (born 1999)

Personal information
- Full name: Michael Ovella Ochieng
- Date of birth: 23 December 1999 (age 26)
- Place of birth: Nairobi, Kenya
- Height: 1.90 m (6 ft 3 in)
- Position: Striker

Team information
- Current team: A.F.C. Leopards

Senior career*
Years	Team	Apps	(Gls)
2016–2018	Kariobangi Sharks		
2018–2021	Vasalund	25	(1)
2021	Marumo Gallants	0	(0)
2022	Township Rollers		
2023	Richards Bay	8	(0)
2024–	A.F.C. Leopards		

International career
2016–2019	Kenya	17	(1)
- * Club domestic league appearances and goals as of 18:53, 12 March 2025 (UTC)

Michael Ovella Ochieng (born 23 December 1999) is a Kenyan international footballer who plays for A.F.C. Leopards as a striker.

== Club career ==
Ochieng has played club football for Kariobangi Sharks, Vasalund, Marumo Gallants, Township Rollers and Richards Bay.

After a year without a club, in September 2024 he signed for A.F.C. Leopards.

== International career ==
He made his international debut for Kenya in 2016. He scored his first ever goal in his career, in the match against New Zealand in Intercontinental Cup held in India. Kenya won 2–1.

=== International goals ===
No	Date	Venue	Opponent	Score	Result	Competition
1.	2 June 2018	Mumbai Football Arena, Mumbai	New Zealand	2–1	2–1	Intercontinental Cup
