= Wasiru Mohammed =

Ghanaian boxer

Personal information
- Nickname: Gyatabi
- Nationality: Ghanaian
- Born: 16 February 1996 (age 30) Ghana
- Weight: Super-bantamweight

Boxing career
- Stance: Orthodox

Boxing record
- Total fights: 12
- Wins: 12
- Win by KO: 11
- Losses: 0

Wasiru Mohammed (born 16 February 1996) is a Ghanaian professional boxer who has held the WBO Global super-bantamweight title since 2019. As of October 2020, he is ranked as the world's sixth best super-bantamweight by the WBO.

== Professional career ==
Mohammed made his professional debut on 29 April 2017, defeating Isaac Mensah by fourth-round technical knockout (TKO) in Accra. After firing off seven wins in less than a year, including six by stoppage, he received his first title shot on 12 May 2018, and scored a first-round knockout (KO) of veteran Kamarudeen Boyefio for the vacant Ghanaian super bantamweight title. Two months later he knocked out another experienced fighter in Raymond Commey to retain his belt.

On 13 October 2018, Mohammed faced undefeated prospect Isaac Sackey for his WBO Africa super bantamweight title. In the second round, Sackey held onto him excessively until Mohammed finally threw him off in the closing seconds, and they both threw multiple punches after the bell. Less than a minute into the next round, Mohammed floored the defending champion with a hard right. He rose to his feet quickly but referee Adorn Bertin waved off the fight without a mandatory eight count. Sackey's team rushed into the ring to confront Bertin, after which chaos erupted inside the Bukom Boxing Arena and the event promptly ended without an official decision. The fight spilled outside the ring as chairs were thrown and used as weapons, with one of them striking Bertin. The Ghana Boxing Authority (GBA) submitted video evidence to the police and later handed out suspensions to Sackey's trainer and two cornermen. Sackey's team filed an appeal with the WBO to protest the stoppage, but they officially recognized Mohammed as champion at a ceremony in November.

On 29 June 2019, Mohammed defeated Tanzanian rival Loren Japhet by 11th-round TKO to win the WBO Global super bantamweight title. In his first title defense on 31 January 2020, he knocked out John Amuzu of Benin with a brutal barrage of punches in the fourth round that sent him to the hospital. The victory moved him into the top ten of the WBO rankings for the first time.

== Professional boxing record ==
12 fights	12 wins	0 losses
By knockout	11	0
By decision	1	0

No.	Result	Record	Opponent	Type	Round, time	Date	Location	Notes
12	Win	12–0	(Benin) John Amuzu	KO	4 (12)	31 Jan 2020	Bukom Boxing Arena, Accra, Ghana	Retained WBO Global super-bantamweight title
11	Win	11–0	(Tanzania) Loren Japhet	TKO	11 (12), 2:05	29 Jun 2019	Accra Sports Stadium, Accra, Ghana	Won inaugural WBO Global super-bantamweight title
10	Win	10–0	(Ghana) Isaac Sackey	KO	3 (12)	13 Oct 2018	Bukom Boxing Arena, Accra, Ghana	Won WBO Africa super-bantamweight title
9	Win	9–0	(Ghana) Raymond Commey	KO	2 (10), 0:44	14 Jul 2018	Bukom Boxing Arena, Accra, Ghana	Retained Ghanaian super-bantamweight title
9	Win	8–0	(Ghana) Kamarudeen Boyefio	KO	1 (12), 1:25	12 May 2018	Bukom Boxing Arena, Accra, Ghana	Won vacant Ghanaian super-bantamweight title
7	Win	7–0	(Ghana) Ezekiel Annan	UD	8	24 Mar 2018	Bukom Boxing Arena, Accra, Ghana	
6	Win	6–0	(Benin) Firmin Nobime	KO	3 (6)	9 Dec 2017	Bukom Boxing Arena, Accra, Ghana	
5	Win	5–0	(Ghana) Dan Quartey	TKO	1 (6), 1:59	27 Oct 2017	Bukom Boxing Arena, Accra, Ghana	
4	Win	4–0	(Ghana) Emmanuel Laryea	TKO	2 (6)	22 Jul 2017	Bukom Boxing Arena, Accra, Ghana	
3	Win	3–0	(Ghana) Shadrack Adams	TKO	5 (6)	14 Jun 2017	Seconds Out Boxing Gymnasium, Accra, Ghana	
2	Win	2–0	(Ghana) Enoch Lamptey	TKO	4 (6)	25 May 2017	Seconds Out Boxing Gymnasium, Accra, Ghana	
1	Win	1–0	(Ghana) Isaac Mensah	TKO	4 (6)	29 Apr 2017	Seconds Out Boxing Gymnasium, Accra, Ghana	

== Personal life ==
He grew up in the Kokomlemle district of Accra and started out as a footballer.
