= Robinson Ndubuisi =

Nigerian football manager

Robinson Ndubuisi Ofwoku
Personal information
- Full name: Robinson Ndubuisi Ofwoku

Robinson Ndubuisi Ofwoku is a Nigerian coach who handled Kenyan Premier League side Nairobi City Stars in 2014.

Ndubuisi replaced Jan Koops but was relieved of his duties and his place taken up by Briton Tim Bryett whom he later replaced for a second stint at the club.
