= Fazeer Mohammed =

Trinidadian cricket commentator and journalist

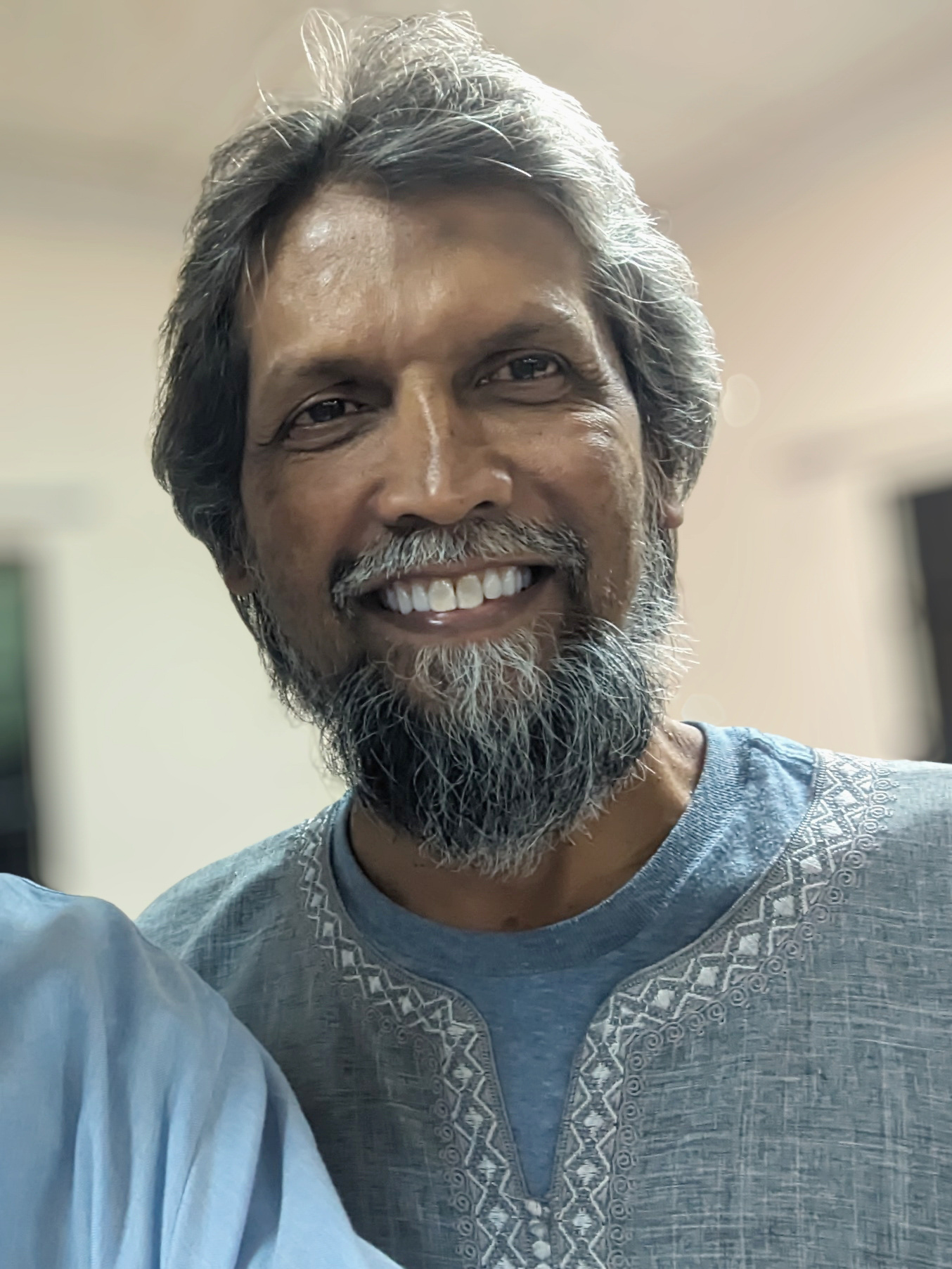
- Fazeer Mohammed in 2025
- Born: Trinidad and Tobago
- Occupations: Cricket commentator and journalist
- Years active: 1987-

Fazeer Mohammed is a Trinidadian cricket commentator and journalist. Mohammed has commentated since 1987, and is best known for his commentary on the West Indies cricket team.

== Career ==
Mohammed is a Trinidadian commentator who is generally considered an objective commentator. He began commentating in 1987, and has commentated in the West Indies, including for Pearl Radio station alongside Curtly Ambrose, and the Regional Super50 tournament for ESPN, and also tour series matches abroad. He has been called "the successor [of Tony Cozier] as the voice rights-holder in and of the West Indies". Mohammed has written for the Wisden Cricketers' Almanack, including the 1997–98 West Indies tour of Pakistan, which he described as "an unqualified disaster", and the 1999–2000 return series, in which the West Indies won the third Test by one wicket. He has also written for Cricinfo.

After Brian Lara scored 400* in a 2003–04 Test against England, Mohammed echoed Lara's words that the achievement was less important than Lara's 375 against England in 1994, since the West Indies lost the series. From 2007 to 2010, he worked for the Caribbean New Media Group, where he worked as a talkshow host and cricket commentator. In November 2010, during his talkshow First Up, Mohammed was involved in an argument with Surujrattan Rambachan about Trinidad and Tobago Prime Minister Kamla Persad-Bissessar; Mohammed was sacked from the organisation a few days later. In 2013, he criticised the West Indies cricket team for not selecting Sunil Narine in their home series against Zimbabwe; Mohammed described Shane Shillingford, who was selected instead of Narine, as "a pelter".

In November 2015, Mohammed was selected by ABC Radio Grandstand to be a commentator for the 2015–16 West Indies tour to Australia; Mohammed was the only West Indian ABC commentator on the tour. Prior to the Boxing Day Test at the Melbourne Cricket Ground, West Indies coach Phil Simmons banned Mohammed from speaking to the West Indies players; Mohammed had been critical of the West Indian team's preparation for the match, and had previously annoyed Simmons and the West Indies players with his outspoken views on the state of West Indian regional cricket, and criticism of Marlon Samuels. In April 2016, Mohammed criticised the West Indies selection policy for continuing not to select players such as Shivnarine Chanderpaul, Dwayne Bravo and Kieron Pollard.

On 27 August 2017 at Headingley while commentating on the second Test between England and the West Indies on BBC Test Match Special Mohammed delighted radio audiences by singing a calypso by Lord Relator about Sunil Gavaskar, written after the Indian tour of the West Indies in 1970–71.
