= Hassan Mohamed =

Hassan Mohamed or variations may refer to:

- Hassan Mohamed (basketball), Qatari basketball player
- Hassan Mohamed (football), Emirati association football player
- Hassan Mohammed (footballer) (born 1989), Emirati footballer
- Hassan Mohammed (cricketer) (born 1980), Malaysian cricketer
- Hassan El Mohamad (born 1988), Lebanese footballer

== See also ==
- Abdiaziz Hassan Mohamed, Somali politician; see List of Members of the Federal Parliament of Somalia
- Abdullahi Haji Hassan Mohamed Nuur (active from 2011), Somali politician
- Hassan Mohamed Hussein (born 1972), Somali politician
- Hassan Sheikh Mohamud (born 1955), Somali politician
- Mohamed Hassan Mohamed (born 1993), Somali middle-distance runner
