= Dennis Ng'ang'a =

Kenyan footballer

Dennis Ng'ang'a is a Kenyan defender currently in the ranks of Zambian Premier League side Zanaco F.C., and the Kenya national football team.

Ng'ang'a formerly turned out for Nairobi City Stars, Tusker F.C., Wazito F.C., and Gor Mahia before crossing borders to Zambia's Zanaco.
