= Noah Abich =

Kenyan footballer (born 1987)

Personal information
- Full name: Noah Abich Otieno Odhiambo
- Date of birth: 2 February 1987 (age 39)
- Place of birth: Nairobi, Kenya
- Position: Defender

Team information
- Current team: Nairobi City Stars

Youth career
- 2000-2003: Thur Gem

Senior career*
Years	Team	Apps	(Gls)
2003-2005	Nzoia Sugar		
2005-2006	Chemelil Sugar		
2006-2008	Sony Sugar	24	(5)
2009–2012	Tusker F.C.	78	(12)
2012	Nakuru AllStars		
2013	A.F.C. Leopards	2	(1)
2013	Kakamega Homeboyz F.C.	3	(1)
2014-2016	Mathare United	66	(14)
2016	Sofapaka	12	(5)
2017	Bandari	17	(3)
2018	Mt. Kenya United	2	(0)
2019-2020	Nairobi City Stars	12	(9)

International career^{‡}
2015–	Kenya	6	(0)
- * Club domestic league appearances and goals as of 29 August 2019 ‡ National team caps and goals as of 29 August 2019

Noah Abich (born 2 February 1987) is a Kenyan footballer who plays for Kenyan National Super League side Nairobi City Stars.

The former Kenya national team player previously played for Nzoia Sugar, Chemelil Sugar, Sony Sugar, Tusker, A.F.C. Leopards, Kakamega Homeboyz F.C. Sofapaka, Mathare United, Bandari, Mt. Kenya United all in the Kenyan Premier League.

He also featured for promotion-chasing Nakuru AllStars back in 2012 on a short-term stint from June.

== Club career ==
=== Sugar belt ===
Abich started his club career in September 2003 after being brought in by coach Evans Kadenge from Thur Gem by Nzoia Sugar alongside schoolmates Kelvin Oluoch and Elisha Omolo. He then crossed over to another sugar belt side Chemelil Sugar after two seasons at Nzoia. In September 2006 he joined Sony Sugar to revamp their backline following the team's first-ever league title. In his first season, he led them to a third-placed finish in 2007 and second-placed finish in 2008.

=== Nairobi ===
After a prolific career in Awendo, Abich was one of the major movers from Sony Sugar to Nairobi-based Tusker whom he played for from 2009 to mid 2012. Before being dropped Abich has been rumored to be heading to Gor Mahia as one of the key transfer targets He led the team to the 2011 title - the first since 2007 - and led them to the KPL Super Cup in early 2012. While at Tusker

=== Nakuru ===
After leaving Tusker in June 2012, Abich joined second-tier side Nakuru AllStars as a player to help coach Simeon Mulama push for promotion. The objective was narrowly missed and Abich was back in Nairobi at the end of that season.

After Nakuru Abich made a rare move to leading side AFC Leopards but opted to exit the side after just six months.

=== Kakamega ===
After his short stint at Leopards, Abich was off to Western Kenya to join Homeboyz from mid 2013. He made his debut for them against Sony Sugar. He left the club following their relegation at the end of that season

=== Mathare United ===
End of the road at Homeboyz marked the beginning for Abich at 2008 KPL champions Mathare United. He stayed with the slum boys for two and a half seasons.

At the end of the 2015 season he top scored for the club with nine goals. This saw him nominated as the Goal Player of the year. He was to leave in mid June 2016.

=== Sofapaka ===
From Mathare he was off to Sofapaka from June 2016 whom he helped survive relegation with key performances. In October of that year he was named the player of the month by SJAK. At the end of the year he earned nomination to for the Premier League defender of the year. He emerged third best.

=== Coast ===
After the great escape at Sofapaka, Abich joined a revamping Bandari team for the entirety of the season.

=== Nakumatt & Nairobi City Stars ===
From Coast Abich was back to Nairobi where he joined Mt. Kenya United formerly Nakumatt FC. It was a trouble year for the club at the end Abich exited the club to weigh his options.

In April 2019, Abich joined second-tier side Nairobi City Stars to save them from relegation. He scored a crucial 9 goals to top score for the club that ultimately rose from the red zone to a 14th-place finish at the end of the shortened 2018/19 season. He is expected to lead the team to promotion at the end of the 2019/20 season.

=== National team ===
While at Mathare United in 2015 Abich received a recall to the Kenya National team by the then coach Bobby Williamson for CECAFA Senior challenge Cup duty in Addis Ababa, Ethiopia.

He was first called up to the national team back in 2006 a head coach Tom Olaba assembled a fresh squad and later in mid April 2010 as well as in mid May 2011. In all instances he never made the final squad.

Earlier in 2005, Abich had been part of Rishadi Shedu's Kenya U20 squad that was shaping up for CECCAFA Youth Championship in Zanzibar.

== Honors ==
=== Teams ===
Tusker F.C.

- Kenyan Premier League

(gold) Champions (2): 2011, 2012
Nairobi City Stars

- Kenyan National Super League

(gold) Champions (1): 2019-20

=== Individual ===
- 2015 Kenyan Premier League - Mathare United Top scorer - 9 goals
- 2015 Kenyan Premier League - Mathare United Nominee Goal Kenya Player of the Year
- (SJAK) Player of the Month: Oct 2016
- 2016 Kenyan Premier League - Sofapaka 3rd best defender of the Year
- 2018/19 Kenyan National Super League - Nairobi City Stars Top scorer - 9 goals
