= 2022–23 Nairobi City Stars season =

Kenyan football club season

Nairobi City Stars
2022–23 KPL season
- Owner: Jonathan Jackson Foundation
- Chairman: Jonathan Jackson
- Head coach: Nicholas Muyoti
- Stadium: Hope Centre
- Kenyan Premier League: 15th
- Betway Cup: DNE
- Top goalscorer: League: Kelvin Etemesi (12); All: Kelvin Etemesi (12)
- Biggest win: 5-2 vs Vihiga Bullets (H), 16 Apr 2023, Kenyan Premier League
- Biggest defeat: 4-1 vs Tusker (A), 27 Nov 2022, vs Gor Mahia (H), 25 Jun 2023, Kenyan Premier League

The 2022-23 KPL season was Nairobi City Stars' third consecutive in the Kenyan Premier League following promotion in 2020, and the 15th overall since 2004.

The 2022-23 season was Nicholas Muyoti second straight season and was considered a transitional one considering a majority of the players that did duty in the 2020-21 season and 2021-22 season exited the club at the expiry of their contracts which allowed a new crop of players to join in.

Of 31 players registered in the 2021-22 season, 17 remained behind - eleven renewed their contracts to join six who had rolling contracts - while another 14 exited including Nicholas Kipkirui, Michael Madoya, Salim Abdalla, Kevin Okumu, Sven Yida and Davis Agesa, amongst others, all left the club. Nine new additions - none with premier league experience - arrived to make it a squad of 26 for the new season. Samuel Kapen, Andrew Kisilu, Clifford Ouma and Kelvin Etemesi who came from the lower tier were part of the new crop of players. On the technical bench side, Abel Omuhaya arrived to replace Zachary Onyango as the goalkeeper trainer.

The team started the season by picking Silver in the inaugural pre-season Elite Cup organised by Kenyan top tier side Kariobangi Sharks. However, the club struggled in the first leg of the season leading to the release of two assistant coaches John Amboko and Noah Abich allowing the arrival of Obed Nyamweya to fill up one of the roles. He was later joined by Peter Opiyo who, due to persistent injuries, took up light coaching duties. He never returned to the pitch as a player after a game against Kenya Police F.C. on 8 February 2023.

A tweak to the first leg squad, led by the arrival of loanees James Mazembe from KCB FC and Levis Okello from Kakamega Homeboyz and FC Talanta duo Dennis Oalo and Vincent Owino ultimately saw the club survive releagtion.

At the end of the season, veteran player Anthony Kimani called it a day during the final game of the season on 25 June 2023 against Gor Mahia. It was his 284th premier league game, and his 109th in City Stars.

== Technical Bench ==
Position	Staff
Head coach	(Kenya) Nicholas Muyoti
First Assistant head coach	(Kenya) John Amboko
Second Assistant head coach	(Kenya) Noah Abich
Goalkeeper coach	(Kenya) Abel Omuhaya
Team manager	(Kenya) Ronney Kagunzi
Security Officer & Trainer	(Kenya) Arthur Museve
Team Physio	(Kenya) Brian Odongo
Kit Manager	(Kenya) Victor Rolex Onyango

Source: Nairobi City Stars

== Players ==
=== Squad information ===
Players and squad numbers last updated on 19 May 2026. Appearances include those in the 2021-22 Kenyan Premier League appearances and the Elite Cup played in preseason.
Note: Flags indicate national team as has been defined under FIFA eligibility rules. Players only hold one non-FIFA nationality.

No.	Player	Nat.	Positions	Signed in	Contract ends	Signed from	Apps.	Goals
Goalkeepers
1	Elvis Ochoro	(Kenya)	GK	2020	2025	(Kenya) Hakati Sportiff	4	0
16	Jacob Osano	(Kenya)	GK	2020	2023	(Kenya) Nairobi Stima	17	0
23	Stephen Njunge	(Kenya)	GK	2020	2023	(Kenya) Wazito	14	0
Defenders
5	Timothy Muganda	(Kenya)	CB	2022	2023	(Kenya) Mara Sugar	10	0
8	Calvin Masawa (Overall captain)	(Kenya)	LB / RB	2019	2023	(Kenya) Nairobi City Stars	11	0
12	Edwin Buliba	(Kenya)	RB / CB	2019	2023	(Kenya) Nairobi City Stars	23	0
14	Rowland Makati	(Kenya)	RB / RW	2020	2023	(Kenya) Vapor Sports	10	0
25	Kenedy Onyango	(Kenya)	CB	2020	2023	(Kenya) Kakamega Homeboyz	32	0
26	Dennis Wanjala	(Kenya)	LB	2021	2024	(Kenya) Nzoia Sugar	23	1
27	Salim Abdalla	(Kenya)	CB	2022	2023	Free agent	10	0
28	Herit Mungai	(Kenya)	LB / LW	2021	2023	(Kenya) Posta Rangers	18	0
Midfielders
2	Elvis Noor	(Kenya)	CM / DM	2019	2022	Kibera Black Stars	25	0
6	Ronney Kola	(Kenya)	DM	2020	2025	(Kenya) KSG Ogopa FC	16	0
7	Pius Omachi	(Kenya)	LW / RW	2022	2023	(Kenya) Vapor Sports	1	0
10	Peter Opiyo	(Kenya)	CM / DM	2020	2022	(Turkmenistan) Altyn Asyr	10	1
11	Andrew Kisilu	(Kenya)	AM	2022	2023	(Kenya) Dandora Love	30	1
15	Newton Ochieng	(Kenya)	AM	2022	2024	(Kenya) Vaport Sports	28	1
17	Abuyeka Kubasu	(Kenya)	CM / AM	2023	2024	(Kenya) Vapor Sports	0	0
18	Clifford Ouma	(Kenya)	DM	2020	2022	(Kenya) Migori Youth	28	0
19	Vincent Owino	(Kenya)	AM	2023	2024	(Kenya) FC Talanta	14	3
21	James Mazembe	(Kenya)	LW	2023	2023	(Kenya) KCB FC	13	0
30	Anthony Kimani (Field captain)	(Kenya)	CM / AM	2019	2023	(Kenya) Bandari	19	1
31	Mohammed Bajaber	(Kenya)	CM / AM	2021	2023	(Kenya) Starfield Academy	12	1
Forwards
9	Dennis Oalo	(Kenya)	ST / AM	2022	2023	(Kenya) FC Talanta	15	1
20	Kelvin Etemesi	(Kenya)	AM	2022	2023	(Kenya) Kangemi AllStars	25	12
22	Samuel Kapen	(Kenya)	ST	2022	2023	(Kenya) Kibera Black Stars	29	8
24	Levis Okello	(Kenya)	ST	2023	2023	(Kenya) Kakamega Homeboyz	8	2
32	Ezekiel Odera	(Kenya)	ST	2020	2023	(Kenya) AFC Leopards	24	4
Players who left
4	Elly Kessy Osotsi	(Kenya)	CB	2022	2023	(Kenya) Kangemi AllStars	1	0
9	Vincent Okoth	(Kenya)	ST / AM	2019	2024	(Kenya) Hakati Sportiff	16	1
17	Daniel Odhiambo	(Kenya)	MF	2022	2023	(Kenya) Kibera Black Stars	10	0
21	Oliver Maloba	(Kenya)	AM	2019	2023	(Kenya) Nairobi City Stars	16	0

Source: Nairobi City Stars

== Off season transfers ==
=== In ===
==== Offseason ====
Date	Pos.	Player	From	Ref.
25 August 2022	CM/AM	(Kenya) Newton Ochieng	(Kenya) Vapor Sports	
26 August 2022	DM	(Kenya) Clifford Ouma	(Kenya) Migori Youth	
1 September 2022	ST	(Kenya) Samuel Kapen	(Kenya) Kibera Black Stars	
15 November 2022	CM/AM	(Kenya) Andrew Kisilu	(Kenya) Dandora Love	
16 November 2022	LW/RW	(Kenya) Daniel Odhiambo	(Kenya) Kibera Black Stars	
17 November 2022	CB	(Kenya) Elly Kessy Osotsi	(Kenya) Kangemi All Stars	
17 November 2022	ST	(Kenya) Kelvin Etemesi	(Kenya) Kangemi All Stars	
17 November 2022	LW/RW	(Kenya) Pius Omachi	(Kenya) Vapor Sports	
28 November 2022	CB	(Kenya) Timothy Muganda	(Kenya) Mara Sugar	

=== Out ===
Date	Pos.	Player	To	Ref.
15 August 2022	DM	(Kenya) Sven Yida	(South Africa) Marumo Gallants	
15 August 2022	RB	(Kenya) Kevin Okumu	(Kenya) KCB FC	
15 August 2022	ST	(Kenya) Nicholas Kipkirui	(Kenya) KCB FC	
15 August 2022	CB	(Kenya) Lennox Ogutu	(Kenya) Mathare United FC	
15 August 2022	CB	(Kenya) Salim Abdalla	Free Agents	
15 August 2022	CB	(Kenya) Wycliffe Onyango	Free Agents	
15 August 2022	AM	(Kenya) Michael Madoya	Free Agents	
15 August 2022	CM	(Kenya) Augustine Kuta	Free Agents	
15 August 2022	LW/LB	(Kenya) John Kamau	Free Agents	
15 August 2022	RW/LW	(Kenya) Rodgers Okumu	Free Agents	
15 August 2022	ST	(Kenya) Erick Ombija	Free Agents	
15 August 2022	ST	(Kenya) Davis Agesa	Free Agents	
15 August 2022	DM	(Kenya) Charles Otieno	Free Agents	

=== In ===
Date	Pos.	Player	From	Ref.
22 Feb 2023	CB	(Kenya) Salim Abdalla	Free agent	
10 Mar 2023	MF	(Kenya) Vincent Owino	(Kenya) FC Talanta	
10 Mar 2023	ST	(Kenya) Dennis Oalo	(Kenya) FC Talanta	
28 Mar 2023	MF	(Kenya) Abuyeka Kubasu	(Kenya) Vapor Sports	
28 Mar 2023	LW	(Kenya) James Mazembe	(Kenya) KCB FC	
28 Mar 2023	ST	(Kenya) Levis Okello	(Kenya) Kakamega Homeboyz FC	

=== Out ===
Date	Pos.	Player	To	Ref.
1 Mar 2023	ST	(Kenya) Daniel Odhiambo	(Kenya) Kibera Black Stars	
1 Mar 2023	ST	(Kenya) Elly Kessy Osotsi	(Kenya) Kibera Black Stars	
1 Mar 2023	ST	(Kenya) Vincent Otieno	(Kenya) Gogo Boys	
27 Mar 2023	ST	(Kenya) Oliver Maloba	Free Agent	

== Competitions ==
=== Overall record ===
Competition	First match	Last match	Starting round	Final position	Record							
Competition	First match	Last match	Starting round	Final position	Pld	W	D	L	GF	GA	GD	Win %
2022-23 KPL	20 Nov 2022	25 Jun 2023	Matchday 1	15th	34	8	10	16	35	49	−14	23.53
2022 Elite Cup	20 Sep 2022	1 Oct 2022	Pool games	2nd	5	2	2	1	9	8	+1	40.00
Total					39	10	12	17	44	57	−13	25.64

Source: rsssf

=== Premier League ===
==== Results summary ====
Overall								Home						Away					
Pld	W	D	L	GF	GA	GD	Pts	W	D	L	GF	GA	GD	W	D	L	GF	GA	GD
34	8	10	16	37	49	−12	34	3	5	9	19	25	−6	5	5	7	18	24	−6

Source: Soccerway

==== Results by round ====
Round	1	2	3	4	5	6	7	8	9	10	11	12	13	14	15	16	17	18	19	20	21	22	23	24	25	26	27	28	29	30	31	32	33	34
Ground	H	A	H	A	A	H	H	A	A	H	A	H	A	A	H	A	H	H	H	A	H	A	H	A	H	H	A	H	A	H	A	H	A	H
Result	L	L	L	D	L	D	L	L	W	L	W	W	L	L	L	D	L	D	D	W	W	L	L	L	W	W	D	D	D	D	W	L	D	L
Position	16	17	18	15	15	15	15	17	16	16	16	15	14	15	15	15	15	16	16	16	15	16	16	16	15	15	15	14	15	15	15	15	15	15
Points	0	0	0	1	1	2	2	2	5	5	8	11	11	11	11	12	12	13	14	17	20	20	20	20	23	26	27	28	29	30	33	33	34	34

Source: Soccerway
A = Away; H = Home; W = Win; D = Draw; L = Loss; P = Postponed

==== Score overview ====
Win Draw Loss

Opposition	Home score	Away score	Aggregate score	Double
AFC Leopards	0-1	2-1	2-2	No
Bandari	1-1	1-2	2-3	No
Bidco Utd	0-2	0-0	0-2	No
Gor Mahia	1-4	0-1	1-5	No
Kakamega Homeboyz	0-0	0-0	0-0	No
Kariobangi Sharks	1-1	2-1	3-2	No
KCB	0-1	0-1	0-2	No
Kenya Police	1-2	2-4	3-6	No
Mathare United	3-0	1-0	4-0	Yes
Nzoia Sugar	2-3	0-1	2-4	No
Posta Rangers	2-3	0-0	2-3	No
Sofapaka	1-1	2-1	3-2	No
Talanta	1-2	2-2	3-4	No
Tusker	1-4	0-0	2-4	No
Ulinzi Stars	0-2	1-1	1-3	No
Vihiga Bullets	5-2	2-4	7-6	No
Wazito	1-0	2-1	3-1	Yes

==== Matches ====
Win Draw Loss Fixtures

The tentative league fixtures were announced on 9 November 2022.

20 November 2022 1	Nairobi City Stars	0-2	Bidco United	Nairobi
15:00 UTC+3		Report	Gateri (24)); Juma 36'	Stadium: Nyayo

27 November 2022 2	Tusker	4-1	Nairobi City Stars	Nairobi
15:00 UTC+3	Ojok 6', 40', 58'; Macharia 89'	Report	Kapen 3'	Stadium: Ruaraka

4 December 2022 3	Nairobi City Stars	1-2	FC Talanta	Nairobi
15:00 UTC+3	Opiyo 2' (pen.)	Report	Odhiambo (yellow card) 26'; Likono 63'; Ogendo 67'	Stadium: Ruaraka

11 December 2022 4	Posta Rangers	0-0	Nairobi City Stars	Thika
15:00 UTC+3	Pamba (yellow card) 22'; Odero (yellow card) 30'	Report	Odera (yellow card) 73'; Kapen (yellow card) 88'	Stadium: Thika Stadium

17 December 2022 5	Nzoia Sugar	1-0	Nairobi City Stars	Bungoma
15:00 UTC+3	Kweyu 45+2' (pen.); Beja (yellow card) 88'	Report	Noor (yellow card) 36'; Odera (yellow card) 84'; Makati (yellow card) 53'	Stadium: Sudi

21 December 2022 6	Nairobi City Stars	1-1	Kariobangi Sharks	Nairobi
15:00 UTC+3	Otieno 5'	Report	Okoth 22'; Alushula (red card) 88'	Stadium: Ruaraka Grounds

4 January 2023 7	Nairobi City Stars	0-1	AFC Leopards	Nairobi
15:00 UTC+3	Noor (yellow card) 18'; Osotsi (yellow card) 27'	Report	Nyakeya (31)); Opiyo (yellow card) 66)'	Stadium: Kasarani

8 January 2023 8	Vihiga Bullets	4-2	Nairobi City Stars	Kakamega
15:00 UTC+3	Ogola 34', 45', 52'; Masinza 69'	Report	Kola (yellow card) 40)'; Noor (yellow card) 66)'; Kapen 88', 90+2'	Stadium: Bukhungu

14 January 2023 9	Sofapaka F.C.	1-2	Nairobi City Stars	Nairobi
15:00 UTC+3	Manga 21' (pen.)	Report	Onyango (yellow card) 26'; Odera 26' (pen.); Kisilu 78'	Stadium: Kasarani

18 January 2023 10	Nairobi City Stars	0-1	KCB FC	Nairobi
15:00 UTC+3	Buliba (yellow card) 43'	Report	Owino 11'; Ochieng (yellow card) 86'	Stadium: Kasarani Annex

22 January 2023 11	Mathare United	0-1	Nairobi City Stars	Nairobi
15:00 UTC+3		Report	Muki 24'; Ouma (yellow card) 45'; Osano (yellow card) 65'	Stadium: Ruaraka

25 January 2023 12	Nairobi City Stars	1-0	Wazito FC	Nairobi
15:00 UTC+3	Kapen 24'	Report		Stadium: Ruaraka

29 January 2023 13	Bandari	2-1	Nairobi City Stars	Mombasa
15:00 UTC+3	Momanyi (yellow card) 39'; Hassan 38'; Siraj (yellow card) 45'; Wadri 101' (pen.)	Report	Odera 45' (pen.); Ouma (yellow card) 45+'; Noor (yellow card) 72'	Stadium: Mbaraki

4 February 2023 14	Gor Mahia	1-0	Nairobi City Stars	Nairobi
15:00 UTC+3	Omala 56'; Ochieng (yellow card) 90'	Report	Makati (yellow card) 30'	Stadium: Kasarani

8 February 2023 15	Nairobi City Stars	1-2	Kenya Police	Nairobi
15:00 UTC+3	Odera 45+'	Report	Mang’eni 60', 61'; Musa (yellow card) 64'; Omoto (yellow card) 74'	Stadium: Kasarani Annex

18 February 2023 16	Kakamega Homeboyz	0-0	Nairobi City Stars	Kakamega
15:00 UTC+3	Esiye (yellow card) 90+'	Report	Etemesi (yellow card) 17'; Osano (yellow card) 45+'; Noor (yellow card) 48'	Stadium: Bukhungu

25 February 2023 17	Nairobi City Stars	0-2	Ulinzi Stars	Nairobi
13:00 UTC+3	Ouma (yellow card) 53'	Report	Muchiri (yellow card) 51'; Masuta (yellow card) 64'; Ochieng 76', 80'	Stadium: Kasarani Annex

7 March 2023 18	Bidco United	0-0	Nairobi City Stars	Nairobi
15:00 UTC+3	Kapen (yellow card) 27'; Muki (yellow card) 82'	Report		Stadium: Kasarani Annex

11 March 2023 19	Nairobi City Stars	1-1	Sofapaka FC	Nairobi
15:00 UTC+3	Kapen 48'; Oalo (yellow card) 63'; Wanjala (yellow card) 69'; Ouma (yellow card) 74'; Etemesi (yellow card) 89'	Report	Manga 75'; Omondi (yellow card) 89'	Stadium: Ruaraka

16 March 2023 20	Wazito FC	1-2	Nairobi City Stars	Muhoroni
15:00 UTC+3	Wesonga 84'	Report	Owino 52'; Oalo (yellow card) 67'; Bajaber 89'	Stadium: Muhoroni

29 March 2023 21	Nairobi City Stars	3-0	Mathare United	Nairobi
15:15 UTC+3	Etemesi 22', 47'; Buliba (yellow card) 29' (yellow-red card) 71'; Owino (yellow card) 58' (yellow-red card) 73'; Shittu (yellow card) 83'; Ochieng 86'	Report		Stadium: Kasarani Annex

5 April 2023 22	KCB FC	1-0	Nairobi City Stars	Nairobi
15:15 UTC+3	Kahiro 73'	Report		Stadium: Kasarani Annex

9 April 2023 23	Nairobi City Stars	2-3	Posta Rangers	Nairobi
15:00 UTC+3	Etemesi 51', 57'; Muki (yellow card) 76'; Kapen (yellow card) 81'	Report	Marita 11', 29'; Osok (yellow card) 66'; Achesa 79'; Otieno (yellow card) 79'	Stadium: Police Sacco

12 April 2023 24	Kenya Police	4-2	Nairobi City stars	Nairobi
15:00 UTC+3	Otanga 13'; Omar (yellow card) 42'; Rupia 48', 66' (pen.); Miheso 62'	Report	Owino 19' (pen.); Onyango (yellow card) 65'; Shittu (yellow card) 81'; Odera 90+2'	Stadium: Police Sacco

16 April 2023 25	Nairobi City Stars	0-0	Vihiga Bullets FC	Nairobi
15:00 UTC+3	Etemesi 3', 15'; Wanjala 17'; Muganda (yellow card) 42'; Ouma (yellow card) 72'; Owino 78'; Kapen 87'	Report	Oyugi 41' (pen.); Ndombi (yellow card) 77'; Owino (yellow card) 85'; Onyango 92+2' (o.g.)	Stadium: Kasarani Annex

22 April 2023 26	Kariobangi Sharks	1-2	Nairobi City Stars	Nairobi
15:00 UTC+3	Onyango (yellow card) 27'; Ngunyi 84'	Report	Etemesi 57'; Kapen 66'; Njunge (yellow card) 88'; Ouma (yellow card) 90'	Stadium: Kasarani Annex

26 April 2023 27	Nairobi City Stars	0-0	Kakamega Homeboyz FC	Nairobi
13:00 UTC+3		Report	Shuma (yellow card) 35'; Ambunya (yellow card) 45'	Stadium: Kasarani Annex

3 May 2023 28	Nairobi City Stars	0-0	Tusker	Nairobi
15:00 UTC+3	Ojok (yellow card) 68'	Report	Soita (yellow card) 38'; Musa (yellow card) 58'; Lusaka (yellow card) 90+1'	Stadium: Ruaraka

7 May 2023 29	Ulinzi Stars FC	1-1	Nairobi City Stars	Nairobi
15:00 UTC+3	Andayi (yellow card) 33'; Ochieng 77'	Report	Muganda (yellow card) 62'; Okello 90+2'	Stadium: Ulinzi Complex

26 April 2023 30	Nairobi City Stars	1-1	Bandari	Nairobi
15:00 UTC+3	Okello 62'; Ochieng (yellow card) 90'	Report	Hassan 48'; Meja (yellow card) 52'	Stadium: Ruaraka

29 May 2023 31	AFC Leopards	1-2	Nairobi City Stars	Nairobi
15:00 UTC+3	Omune 18'; Owiti (yellow card) 31'	Report	Onyango (yellow card) 71'; Kapen (yellow card) 75'; Etemesi 64', 89'	Stadium: Kasarani Annex

3 June 2023 32	Nairobi City Stars	2-3	Nzoia Sugar FC	Nairobi
15:00 UTC+3	Oalo 3'; Owino (yellow card) 35' (yellow-red card) 58'; Noor (yellow card) 40'; Etemesi 89' (pen.)	Report	Juma (yellow card) 30'; Sije 36', 58' (yellow card) 58'; Kweyu (yellow card) 61'; Beja 73'	Stadium: Kasarani Annex

20 June 2023 33	FC Talanta	2-2	Nairobi City Stars	Nairobi
15:00 UTC+3	Luganji 70' (pen.); Kisaka 90'; Onyango (red card) 90+2'	Report	Muganda (yellow card) 33'; Etemesi 40' (pen.), 63'	Stadium: Kasarani Annex

25 June 2023 34	Nairobi City Stars	2-2	Gor Mahia	Nairobi
15:00 UTC+3	Kapen 48'; Onyango (yellow card) 77'	Report	Omala 50'; Lwasa 62'; Odhiambo 80'; Onyango 90'	Stadium: Kasarani

=== Elite Cup ===
Win Draw Loss Fixtures

20 September 2022 MD 1	Kenya Police F.C.	1-1	Nairobi City Stars	Nairobi
15:00 UTC+3	Ambulu (yellow card) 34'; Omondi (yellow card) 55'; Francis Kahata 39'; Omoto (yellow card) 80'; Musa (yellow card) 90+'	Report	Opiyo (yellow card) 43'; Bajaber 61'	Stadium: Kasarani Annex

24 September 2022 MD 2	Nairobi City Stars	4-1	MCF	Nairobi
15:00 UTC+3	Makati (yellow card) 42'; Dante 45+'; Odera 58'; Onyango 64' (pen.); Etemesi 80'	Report	Aleji 79'	Stadium: Kasarani Annex

6 June 2021 MD 3	Ulinzi Stars	2-2	Nairobi City Stars	Nairobi
15:00 UTC+3	Omondi 19'; Muchiri 46' (yellow card) 89'	Report	Mungai 90+1'; Opiyo 90+3'	Stadium: Kasarani Annex

29 September 2022 Semis	Kariobangi Sharks	2(2)-2(3)	Nairobi City Stars	Nairobi
15:00 UTC+3	Otieno 16', 26'; Onyango (yellow card) 63'	Report	Onyango (yellow card) 65'; Otiala 73' (pen.); Tyson 83'; Otieno (yellow card) 90+'	Stadium: Kasarani Annex

29 September 2022 Final	Kenya Police F.C.	2-0	Nairobi City Stars	Nairobi
15:00 UTC+3	Simiyu 63'; Ambulu (yellow card) 70'; Omondi 74'	Report		Stadium: Kasarani Annex

== Statistics ==
=== Appearances ===
No.	Pos.	Player	Premier League	Elite Cup	Total
1	GK	(Kenya) Elvis Ochoro	4	1	5
2	MF	(Kenya) Elvis Noor	25	5	20
4	DF	(Kenya) Salim Abdalla	7	0	7
5	DF	(Kenya) Timothy Muganda	10	5	15
6	DM	(Kenya) Ronney Kola	16	2	18
7	FW	(Kenya) Pius Omachi	1	0	1
8	DF	(Kenya) Calvin Masawa	11	3	14
9	FW	(Kenya) Dennis Oalo	15	0	15
10	MF	(Kenya) Peter Opiyo	10	5	15
11	FW	(Kenya) Andrew Kisilu	30	1	31
12	DF	(Kenya) Edwin Buliba	23	0	23
14	MF	(Kenya) Rowland Makati	10	2	12
15	MF	(Kenya) Newton Ochieng	28	5	33
16	GK	(Kenya) Jacob Osano	17	1	18
17	FW	(Kenya) Abuyeka Kubasu	0	0	0
18	MF	(Kenya) Clifford Ouma	28	5	33
20	FW	(Kenya) Kelvin Etemesi	25	5	30
21	LW	(Kenya) James Mazembe	13	0	13
22	DF	(Kenya) Samuel Kapen	29	4	33
23	GK	(Kenya) Stephen Njunge	14	3	17
24	FW	(Kenya) Levis Okello	8	0	8
25	DF	(Kenya) Kenedy Onyango	32	3	35
26	LB	(Kenya) Dennis Wanjala	23	2	25
28	LB	(Kenya) Herit Mungai	18	3	21
30	MF	(Kenya) Anthony Kimani	19	3	22
31	FW	(Kenya) Mohammed Bajaber	12	4	16
32	FW	(Kenya) Ezekiel Odera	24	5	29
Players who left the club
4	DF	(Kenya) Elly Kessy Osotsi	1	2	3
9	FW	(Kenya) Vincent Otieno	16	3	19
17	FW	(Kenya) Daniel Odhiambo	10	3	13
21	AM	(Kenya) Oliver Maloba	16	5	21

Source: Nairobi City Stars

=== Goalscorers ===
No.	Pos.	Player	Premier League	Elite Cup	Total
20	FW	(Kenya) Kelvin Etemesi	12	1	13
22	FW	(Kenya) Samuel Kapen	8	0	8
32	ST	(Kenya) Ezekiel Odera	4	1	5
10	MF	(Kenya) Peter Opiyo	2	1	3
19	AM	(Kenya) Vincent Owino	3	0	3
24	FW	(Kenya) Levis Okello	2	0	2
31	FW	(Kenya) Mohammed Bajaber	1	1	2
9	ST	(Kenya) Dennis Oalo	1	0	1
11	MF	(Kenya) Andrew Kisilu	1	0	1
15	AM	(Kenya) Newton Ochieng	1	0	1
25	DF	(Kenya) Kenedy Onyango	0	1	1
26	DF	(Kenya) Dennis Wanjala	1	0	1
28	DF	(Kenya) Herit Mungai	0	1	1
30	AM	(Kenya) Anthony Kimani	1	0	1
Players who left the club
9	FW	(Kenya) Vincent Okoth	1	2	3
17	FW	(Kenya) Daniel Odhiambo	0	1	1
Totals			37	9	46

=== Top Assists ===
No.	Pos.	Player	Premier League	Elite Cup	Total
17	LW	(Kenya) James Mazembe	5	0	5
22	FW	(Kenya) Samuel Kapen	2	2	4
26	LB	(Kenya) Dennis Wanjala	4	0	4
9	FW	(Kenya) Dennis Oalo	3	0	3
11	AM	(Kenya) Andrew Kisilu	3	0	3
12	DF	(Kenya) Edwin Buliba	3	0	3
32	FW	(Kenya) Ezekiel Odera	3	0	3
2	MF	(Kenya) Elvis Noor	0	2	2
18	DM	(Kenya) Clifford Ouma	2	0	2
19	AM	(Kenya) Vincent Owino	2	0	2
25	DF	(Kenya) Kenedy Onyango	2	0	2
10	MF	(Kenya) Peter Opiyo	1	0	1
14	RB	(Kenya) Rowland Makati	1	0	1
15	MF	(Kenya) Newton Ochieng	1	0	1
20	FW	(Kenya) Kelvin Etemesi	1	0	1
28	LB	(Kenya) Herit Mungai	1	0	1
30	AM	(Kenya) Anthony Kimani	1	0	1
31	FW	(Kenya) Mohammed Bajaber	1	0	1
Opponent			0	1	1
Players who left the club
21	AM	(Kenya) Oliver Maloba	0	3	3
4	DF	(Kenya) Elly Kessy Osotsi	0	1	1
9	FW	(Kenya) Vincent Okoth	1	0	1
Totals			37	9	46

Source: Nairobi City Stars

=== Clean sheets ===
Rank	No.	Pos.	Player	Premier League	Elite Cup	Total
1	23	GK	(Kenya) Jacob Osano	5	0	5
2	16	GK	(Kenya) Stephen Njunge	3	0	1
3	1	GK	(Kenya) Elvis Ochoro	1	0	0
Totals				8	0	8
