= 2021–22 Nairobi City Stars season =

Kenyan football club season

Nairobi City Stars
2021–22 KPL season
- Owner: Jonathan Jackson Foundation
- Chairman: Jonathan Jackson
- Head coach: Nicholas Muyoti
- Stadium: Hope Centre
- Kenyan Premier League: 5th
- Betway Cup: Not held
- Top goalscorer: League: Ezekiel Odera (10); All: Ezekiel Odera (10)
- Biggest win: 3-1 vs Wazito (H), 21 Oct 2021, Kenyan Premier League
- Biggest defeat: 3-1 vs Sofapaka (A), 26 Sep 2021, Kenyan Premier League

The 2021–22 KPL season was Nairobi City Stars' second consecutive campaign back in the Kenyan Premier League following promotion in 2020, and the 14th overall since 2004.

The team was under the guidance of coach Nicholas Muyoti who joined the club in the offseason from Kakamega Homeboyz. Under Muyoti City Stars enjoyed one of their most competitive top-flight seasons in recent years, finishing fifth - the best ever position - in the league standings. The team registered 14 wins to tie the record of most wins set in the 2005-6 season and 14 clean sheets tying the a record set in the 2012 season.

The previous season squad was tweaked a little after two left backs Bolton Omwenga and Wesley Onguso left the club as well as forward Aziz Okaka and Ugandan defender Mukisa Lubowa. That created room for the arrival Nzoia United left back Dennis Wanjala and forward Michael Madoya from Tusker F.C. as well as stopper Lennox Ogutu from Mathare United. The club was also boosted by the contract renewals of defenders Herit Mungai and Wycliffe Onyango as well as midfielder Peter Opiyo.At the end of the season, keeper Jacob Osano, on his debut top flight season, registered 13 clean sheets to be ranked amongst the top keepers in the league.

== Technical Bench ==
Position	Staff
Head coach	(Kenya) Nicholas Muyoti
Assistant head coach	(Kenya) John Amboko
Goalkeeper coach	(Kenya) Zachary Onyango
Team manager	(Kenya) Noah Abich
Trainer	(Kenya) Arthur Museve
Team Physio	(Kenya) Brian Odongo
Kit Manager	(Kenya) Joseph Andere

Source: Nairobi City Stars

== Players ==
=== Squad information ===
Players and squad numbers last updated on 19 May 2026. Appearances are limited to the 2021-22 Kenyan Premier League appearances only.
Note: Flags indicate national team as has been defined under FIFA eligibility rules. Players only hold one non-FIFA nationality.

No.	Player	Nat.	Positions	Signed in	Contract ends	Signed from	Apps.	Goals
Goalkeepers
1	Elvis Ochoro	(Kenya)	GK	2020	2025	(Kenya) Hakati Sportiff	1	0
16	Jacob Osano	(Kenya)	GK	2020	2022	(Kenya) Nairobi Stima	29	0
23	Stephen Njunge	(Kenya)	GK	2020	2022	(Kenya) Wazito	4	0
Defenders
4	Salim Abdalla	(Kenya)	CB	2019	2022	(Kenya) AFC Leopards	19	2
8	Calvin Masawa (Overall captain)	(Kenya)	LB / RB	2019	2022	(Kenya) Nairobi City Stars	14	0
12	Edwin Buliba	(Kenya)	RB / CB	2019	2022	(Kenya) Nairobi City Stars	9	0
19	Kevin Okumu	(Kenya)	RB / RW	2021	2023	(Kenya) Wazito	24	0
22	Wycliffe Onyango	(Kenya)	CB	2019	2022	(Kenya) Kariobangi Sharks	5	0
25	Kenedy Onyango	(Kenya)	CB	2020	2022	(Kenya) Kakamega Homeboyz	24	1
26	Dennis Wanjala	(Kenya)	LB	2021	2024	(Kenya) Nzoia Sugar	22	0
27	Lennox Ogutu	(Kenya)	CB	2021	2022	(Kenya) Mathare United	15	2
28	Herit Mungai	(Kenya)	LB / LW	2021	2022	(Kenya) Posta Rangers	13	0
Midfielders
2	Elvis Noor	(Kenya)	CM / DM	2019	2022	Kibera Black Stars	14	0
3	Charles Otieno	(Kenya)	DM	2019	2022	(Kenya) Nairobi City Stars	10	0
5	Michael Madoya	(Kenya)	AM	2021	2022	(Kenya) Tusker FC	9	0
6	Ronney Kola	(Kenya)	DM	2020	2025	(Kenya) KSG Ogopa FC	0	0
10	Peter Opiyo	(Kenya)	CM / DM	2020	2022	(Turkmenistan) Altyn Asyr	17	3
14	Rowland Makati	(Kenya)	AM	2020	2024	(Kenya) Vaport Sports	2	0
18	Sven Yida	(Kenya)	DM	2020	2022	(Kenya) Kariobangi Sharks	32	2
20	Timothy Ouma	(Kenya)	AM	2020	2023	(Kenya) Laiser Hill Academy	32	7
21	Oliver Maloba	(Kenya)	AM	2019	2022	(Kenya) Nairobi City Stars	23	2
29	Augustine Kuta	(Kenya)	MF	2021	2021	(Kenya) Kibera Black Stars	10	0
30	Anthony Kimani (Field captain)	(Kenya)	CM / AM	2019	2022	(Kenya) Bandari	29	6
31	Mohammed Bajaber	(Kenya)	CM / AM	2021	2022	(Kenya) Starfield Academy	4	0
Forwards
7	Rodgers Okumu	(Kenya)	LW / RW	2020	2022	(Kenya) Coast Stima	24	3
9	Vincent Okoth	(Kenya)	ST / AM	2019	2022	(Kenya) Hakati Sportiff	9	0
11	Davis Agesa	(Kenya)	RW / LW / ST	2018	2022	(Kenya) Nairobi City Stars	28	1
15	John Kamau	(Kenya)	LB / LW	2020	2022	(Kenya) Tusker FC	15	0
17	Nicholas Kipkirui	(Kenya)	LW / ST	2021	2023	(Kenya) Gor Mahia	25	3
24	Erick Ombija	(Kenya)	ST	2020	2022	(Kenya) Gor Mahia	14	2
32	Ezekiel Odera	(Kenya)	ST	2020	2022	(Kenya) AFC Leopards	30	10
Players who left
29	Ebrimah Sanneh	(Kenya)	ST	2019	2022	(Kenya) Kariobangi Sharks	1	0

Source: Nairobi City Stars

== Off season transfers ==
=== In ===
==== Offseason ====
Date	Pos.	Player	From	Ref.
18 September 2021	MF	(Kenya) Michael Madoya	(Kenya) Tusker FC	
18 September 2021	LB	(Kenya) Dennis Wanjala	(Kenya) Nzoia Sugar	
28 September 2021	CB	(Kenya) Lennox Ogutu	(Kenya) Mathare United	

=== Out ===
Date	Pos.	Player	To	Ref.
24 August 2021	LB	(Kenya) Bolton Omwenga	(Tanzania) Kagera Sugar	
1 July 2020	LB	(Kenya) Wesley Onguso	Free agents	
1 July 2020	MF	(Kenya) Aziz Okaka	Free agents	

=== In ===
Date	Pos.	Player	From	Ref.
4 February 2022	MF	(Kenya) Mohammed Bajaber	(Kenya) Starfield Academy (loan)	
7 February 2022	MF	(Kenya) Augustine Kuta	(Kenya) Kibera Black Stars	

=== Out ===
Date	Pos.	Player	To	Ref.
26 January 2022	ST	(The Gambia) Ebrimah Sanneh	Free agent	

== Competitions ==
=== Overall record ===
Competition	First match	Last match	Starting round	Final position	Record							
Competition	First match	Last match	Starting round	Final position	Pld	W	D	L	GF	GA	GD	Win %
2021-22 KPL	26 Sep 2021	12 Jun 2022	Matchday 1	5th	34	14	10	10	45	34	+11	41.18
2021-22 Betway Cup	-	-	Not held	Not held	0	0	0	0	0	0	+0	—
Total					34	14	10	10	45	34	+11	41.18

Source: rsssf

=== Premier League ===
==== Results summary ====
Overall								Home						Away					
Pld	W	D	L	GF	GA	GD	Pts	W	D	L	GF	GA	GD	W	D	L	GF	GA	GD
34	14	10	10	45	34	+11	52	5	6	6	21	16	+5	9	4	4	24	18	+6

Source: Soccerway

==== Results by round ====
Round	1	2	3	4	5	6	7	8	9	10	11	12	13	14	15	16	17	18	19	20	21	22	23	24	25	26	27	28	29	30	31	32	33	34
Ground	A	A	H	H	A	H	H	H	A	H	A	H	A	A	A	H	H	A	H	A	H	A	H	A	A	A	H	H	H	A	H	A	A	H
Result	L	W	W	W	D	W	L	D	W	L	W	L	W	W	D	D	W	D	W	L	L	W	L	W	D	W	L	D	W	D	L	L	D	D
Position	13	9	5	1	2	2	5	4	4	5	3	4	2	2	2	2	2	2	2	5	5	3	4	2	3	2	6	5	3	5	6	5	5	5
Points	0	3	6	9	10	13	13	14	17	17	20	20	23	26	27	28	31	32	35	35	35	38	38	41	42	45	45	46	49	50	50	50	51	52

Source: Soccerway
A = Away; H = Home; W = Win; D = Draw; L = Loss; P = Postponed

==== Score overview ====
Win Draw Loss

Opposition	Home score	Away score	Aggregate score	Double
AFC Leopards	0-1	1-1	1-2	No
Bandari	2-1	0-1	2-2	No
Bidco Utd	2-0	0-2	2-2	No
Gor Mahia	2-3	2-0	4-3	No
Kakamega Homeboyz	1-1	4-4	5-5	No
Kariobangi Sharks	1-2	1-0	2-2	No
KCB	0-1	2-3	2-4	No
Kenya Police	2-0	0-0	2-0	No
Mathare United	3-0	3-0	6-0	Yes
Nzoia Sugar	0-0	1-1	1-1	No
Posta Rangers	1-2	1-1	2-3	No
Sofapaka	1-3	0-2	1-5	No
Talanta	2-2	2-1	4-3	No
Tusker	0-0	1-0	1-0	No
Ulinzi Stars	0-0	1-0	1-0	No
Vihiga United	0-0	2-1	2-1	No
Wazito	3-1	1-0	4-1	Yes

==== Matches ====
Win Draw Loss Fixtures

The tentative league fixtures were announced on 16 September 2021.

26 September 2021 1	Sofapaka	3-1	Nairobi City Stars	Wundanyi
15:00 UTC+3	Sifuna (yellow card) 34)'; Waithera 40', 90' (yellow card) 52'; Achesa (yellow card) 65)'; Juma 81' (pen.)	Report	Noor (yellow card) 38)'; Okumu (yellow card) 81'; Ouma 87'	Stadium: Wundanyi Stadium

16 October 2021 2	Kenya Police	0-2	Nairobi City Stars	Kasarani
15:00 UTC+3	Makwata (yellow card) 36'; Ouma (yellow card) 55'; Munala (yellow card) 90'	Report	Ouma 18'; Odera 36'; Okuse (yellow card) 62'; Ombija (yellow card) 80'; Sven (yellow card) 88'	Stadium: Kasarani Annex

21 October 2021 3	Nairobi City Stars	3-1	Wazito	Thika
15:00 UTC+3	Muki (yellow card) 30'; Okumu (yellow card) 63'; Onyango 77'; Ouma 78'; Otieno (yellow card) 86'; Okuse 89'	Report	Omurwa (yellow card) 20'; Odhiambo (yellow card) 33'; Nyakeya (yellow card) 60'; Ojuang 79'; Oburu (yellow card) 84'	Stadium: Thika Stadium; Referee: Lucas Odhiambo

24 October 2021 4	Nairobi City Stars	0–2	Bidco United	Thika
15:00 UTC+3	Kipkirui (yellow card) 30' (goal) 57'; Muki (yellow card) 38'; Ouma (yellow card) 48'; Ombija 61'	Report	Ochieng (yellow card) 72'	Stadium: Thika Stadium

30 October 2021 5	Posta Rangers	1-1	Nairobi City Stars	Thika
15:00 UTC+3	Marita 34'; Majid (yellow card) 69'	Report	Maloba (yellow card) 60'; Muki 64'; Ombija (yellow card) 87'	Stadium: Thika Stadium

6 November 2021 6	Nairobi City Stars	4-0	Vihiga Bullets	Nairobi
15:00 UTC+3	Shittu 10'; Odera 62'; Muki 68'; Okoth 74'	Report	Herit (yellow card) 39'; Muki (yellow card) 55'; Opiyo 82' (pen.)	Stadium: Ruaraka Grounds

4 December 2021 7	Nairobi City Stars	1-2	Kariobangi Sharks	Nairobi
15:00 UTC+3	Okumu (yellow card) 27'; Odera 55'	Report	Lemu 22' (pen.); Obiero (yellow card) 60)'; Ngunyi (68))	Stadium: Ruaraka Grounds

8 December 2021 8	Nairobi City Stars	0-0	Nzoia Sugar	Nairobi
15:00 UTC+3		Report	Mwangi (yellow card) 25)'; Maliachi (yellow card) 53)'; Kweyu (yellow card) 90)'	Stadium: Ruarka Grounds

11 December 2021 9	Mathare United	0-2	Nairobi City Stars	Nairobi
15:00 UTC+3		Report	Opiyo 18', 35'	Stadium: Ruaraka Grounds

17 December 2021 10	Nairobi City Stars	0-1	KCB FC	Nairobi
15:00 UTC+3	Buliba (yellow card) 43'	Report	Ambulu 88'	Stadium: Ruaraka Grounds

30 December 2021 11	Gor Mahia FC	0-2	Nairobi City Stars	Nairobi
15:00 UTC+3	Odera (yellow card) 20' (goal) 40'; Onyango (yellow card) 25'; Muki 71'	Report	Nkata (yellow card) 70'	Stadium: Nyayo Stadium

5 January 2022 12	Nairobi City Stars	0-1	AFC Leopards	Nairobi
15:00 UTC+3	Onyango (yellow card) 30'; Kipkirui (yellow card) 38'	Report	Otieno 49'; Omondi (yellow card) 70'	Stadium: Nyayo Stadium

8 January 2022 13	FC Talanta	1-2	Nairobi City Stars	Nairobi
15:00 UTC+3	Malika (yellow card) 24'; Wanjala (yellow card) 69'; Mandela (yellow card) 75'; Kahiro 80'	Report	Muki 31'; Sven 36' (yellow card) 45'; Osano (yellow card) 65'	Stadium: Kasarani Annex

16 January 2022 14	Tusker FC	0-1	Nairobi City Stars	Nairobi
15:00 UTC+3	Ouma (yellow card) 77'	Report	Shittu (yellow card) 61'; Maloba 87'	Stadium: Kasarani Annex

20 January 2022 15	Kakamega Homeboyz	4-4	Nairobi City Stars	Kakamega
15:00 UTC+3	Chala 18'; Okoth 24', 64' (pen.); Mudavadi 39'	Report	Okumu (yellow card) 22'; Odera (yellow card) 22'; Sven 33'; Ouma 41'; Ombija 81'; Agesa 85'	Stadium: Bukhungu Stadium

24 January 2022 16	Nairobi City Stars	1-1	Kakamega Homeboyz	Nairobi
15:00 UTC+3	Okumu (yellow card) 58'; Yida (yellow card) 74'; Okuse 88'; Ombija (yellow card) 90+'	Report	Ambunya (yellow card) 29'; Masha 76'	Stadium: Ruaraka Grounds

5 February 2022 17	Kariobangi Sharks	0-1	Nairobi City Stars	Nairobi
15:00 UTC+3		Report	Odera 63'; Masawa (yellow card) 76'; Maloba (yellow card) 85'	Stadium: Kasarani Annex

13 February 2022 18	Nzoia Sugar	1-1	Nairobi City Stars	Bungoma
15:00 UTC+3	Mwangi 88'	Report	Muki 29'; Onyango (yellow card) 47'; Osano (yellow card) 76'; Okuse (yellow card) 82'	Stadium: Sudi

26 February 2022 19	Nairobi City Stars	3-0	Mathare United	Thika
15:00 UTC+3	Ouma (yellow card) 16'; Ogutu 50'; Odera 64'; Kipkirui 84' (yellow card) 90'	Report	Muyonga (yellow card) 16'; Ndonye (yellow card) 22'; Odhiambo (yellow card) 39'; Alwanga (yellow card) 43'	Stadium: Thika

5 March 2022 20	Bidco United	2-0	Nairobi City Stars	Thika
15:00 UTC+3	Gathu (yellow card) 59'; Nzuki 53' (pen.); Gitau (red card) 63'; Opondo (yellow card) 75'; Yobo 76'	Report	Onyango (yellow card) 40'; Opiyo (yellow card) 54'; Odera (red card) 63'; Kipkirui (yellow card) 55' (penalty missed) 88	Stadium: Thika Stadium

9 March 2022 21	Nairobi City Stars	1-2	Posta Rangers	Thika
15:00 UTC+3	Onyango (yellow card) 32'; Ogutu 42'; Kimani (yellow card) 84'; Ouma (yellow card) 87'	Report	Otieno 5'; Wasambo (yellow card) 56'; Odera (yellow card) 58'; Odongo 83'	Stadium: Thika

13 March 2022 22	Vihiga United	1-2	Nairobi City Stars	Kakamega
15:00 UTC+3	Arrot 24' (pen.)	Report	Kipkirui 7'; Yida (yellow card) 38'; Ouma (yellow card) 55'; Shittu 78'	Stadium: Bukhungu

17 March 2022 23	Bandari	1-0	Nairobi City Stars	Mombasa
15:00 UTC+3	Hassan 45' (yellow card) 70'	Report	Shittu (yellow card) 50'; Okumu (yellow card) 69'; Yida (yellow card) 74'	Stadium: Mbaraki

2 April 2022 24	Nairobi City stars	2-1	Bandari	Nairobi
15:00 UTC+3	Ndemi (yellow card) 43'; Kasumba 78' (pen.)	Report	Ouma 15'; Odera 20'; Agesa (yellow card) 28'; Ogutu (yellow card) 33'; Abdalla (yellow card) 42'	Stadium: Ruaraka

10 April 2022 25	Nairobi City Stars	0-0	Ulinzi Stars	Nairobi
15:00 UTC+3	Ouma (yellow card) 78'; Okumu (yellow card) 88'	Report	Muloma (yellow card) 12'; Omondi (yellow card) 71'	Stadium: Ruaraka

18 April 2022 26	Ulinzi Stars	0-1	Nairobi City Stars	Nairobi
15:00 UTC+3	Muloma (yellow card) 65'; Abwao (yellow card) 88'; Ongoma (yellow card) 90+1'	Report	Maloba 85'; Amboko (coach) (yellow card) 88'	Stadium: Ruaraka

23 April 2022 27	Nairobi City Stars	0-0	Sofapaka FC	Nairobi
15:00 UTC+3	Muki (red card) 55'	Report	Juma 50' (pen.); Achesa (yellow card) 60'; Odhiambo (yellow card) 77'	Stadium: Ruaraka

1 May 2022 28	Nairobi City Stars	0-0	Kenya Police	Nairobi
15:00 UTC+3	Sven (yellow card) 34'; Onyango (yellow card) 55'; Kamau (yellow card) 57'	Report	Soita (yellow card) 38'; Musa (yellow card) 58'; Lusaka (yellow card) 90+1'	Stadium: Ruaraka

9 May 2022 29	Wazito FC	0-1	Nairobi City Stars	Nairobi
15:00 UTC+3	Asieche (yellow card) 73'; Adisa (yellow card) 90+'	Report	Odera 53' (yellow card) 59'; Ouma (yellow card) 90+'; Onyango (yellow card) 90+'	Stadium: Kasarani Annex

15 May 2022 30	Nairobi City Stars	0-0	Tusker FC	Nairobi
15:00 UTC+3		Report	Oruchum (yellow card) 48'; Joshua (yellow card) 56'	Stadium: Ruaraka

21 May 2022 31	KCB FC	3-2	Nairobi City Stars	Nairobi
15:00 UTC+3	Otanga 44', 48', 61'	Report	Odera 45+2'; Okuse 85'	Stadium: Kasarani Annex

29 May 2022 32	Nairobi City Stars	2-3	Gor Mahia FC	Nairobi
15:00 UTC+3	Muki 32'; Ouma 47'; Yida (yellow card) 49'; Noor (yellow card) 86'	Report	Onyango 42'; Omala 64'; Wanjala 64' (o.g.); Mathews (red card) 72'	Stadium: Kasarani

6 June 2022 33	AFC Leopards	1-1	Nairobi City Stars	Thika
15:00 UTC+3	Mulili (yellow card) 25'; Lopaga 74'; Mukhekhe (yellow card) 81'	Report	Ouma 40'; Buliba (yellow card) 90+2'	Stadium: Thika

12 June 2022 34	Nairobi City Stars	2-2	FC Talanta	Thika
15:00 UTC+3	Odera 14' (pen.); Ochoro (yellow card) 36'; Opiyo 52'; Kamau (yellow card) 90+2'	Report	Jairo 47'; Kahiro 47' (pen.)	Stadium: Thika

== Statistics ==
=== Appearances ===
No.	Pos.	Player	Premier League	Betway Cup	Total
1	GK	(Kenya) Elvis Ochoro	1	0	1
2	MF	(Kenya) Elvis Noor	14	0	14
3	MF	(Kenya) Charles Otieno	10	0	10
4	DF	(Kenya) Salim Abdalla	19	0	19
5	DF	(Kenya) Michael Madoya	9	0	9
6	DF	(Kenya) Ronney Kola	0	0	0
7	FW	(Kenya) Rodgers Okumu	24	0	24
8	DF	(Kenya) Calvin Masawa	14	0	14
9	FW	(Kenya) Vincent Otieno	7	0	7
10	MF	(Kenya) Peter Opiyo	17	0	17
11	FW	(Kenya) Davis Agesa	28	0	28
12	DF	(Kenya) Edwin Buliba	9	0	9
14	MF	(Kenya) Rowland Makati	2	0	2
15	FW	(Kenya) John Kamau John	15	0	15
16	GK	(Kenya) Jacob Osano	29	0	29
17	FW	(Kenya) Nicholas Kipkirui	25	0	25
18	MF	(Kenya) Sven Yida	32	0	32
19	DF	(Kenya) Kevin Okumu	24	0	24
20	MF	(Kenya) Timothy Ouma	32	0	32
21	MF	(Kenya) Oliver Maloba	23	0	23
22	DF	(Kenya) Wycliffe Onyango	5	0	5
23	MF	(Kenya) Stephen Njunge	4	0	4
24	FW	(Kenya) Erick Ombija	14	0	14
25	DF	(Kenya) Kenedy Onyango	24	0	24
26	DF	(Kenya) Dennis Wanjala	22	0	22
27	MF	(Kenya) Lennox Ogutu	15	0	15
28	DF	(Kenya) Herit Mungai	13	0	13
29	FW	(Kenya) Augustine Kuta	10	0	10
30	MF	(Kenya) Anthony Kimani	29	0	29
31	FW	(Kenya) Mohammed Bajaber	4	0	4
32	FW	(Kenya) Ezekiel Odera	30	0	30
Players who left the club
29	ST	(The Gambia) Ebrimah Sanneh	1	0	1

Source: Nairobi City Stars

=== Goalscorers ===
No.	Pos.	Player	Premier League	Betway Cup	Total
32	FW	(Kenya) Ezekiel Odera	10	0	10
20	MF	(Kenya) Timothy Ouma	7	0	7
30	MF	(Kenya) Anthony Kimani	6	0	6
7	FW	(Kenya) Rodgers Okumu	3	0	3
10	FW	(Kenya) Peter Opiyo	3	0	3
17	FW	(Kenya) Nicholas Kipkirui	3	0	3
4	DF	(Kenya) Salim Abdalla	2	0	2
18	FW	(Kenya) Sven Yida	2	0	2
21	MF	(Kenya) Oliver Maloba	2	0	2
24	FW	(Kenya) Erick Ombija	2	0	2
27	DF	(Kenya) Lennox Ogutu	2	0	2
9	FW	(Kenya) Vincent Okoth	1	0	1
11	FW	(Kenya) Davis Agesa	1	0	1
26	DF	(Kenya) Kenedy Onyango	1	0	1
Totals			45	0	45

=== Top Assists ===
No.	Pos.	Player	Premier League	Betway Cup	Total
20	MF	(Kenya) Timothy Ouma	9	0	9
17	FW	(Kenya) Nicholas Kipkirui	4	0	4
18	MF	(Kenya) Sven Yida	4	0	4
32	FW	(Kenya) Ezekiel Odera	4	0	4
10	FW	(Kenya) Peter Opiyo	3	0	3
11	FW	(Kenya) Davis Agesa	3	0	3
19	DF	(Kenya) Kevin Okumu	3	0	3
30	MF	(Kenya) Anthony Kimani	3	0	3
21	FW	(Kenya) Erick Ombija	2	0	2
27	DF	(Kenya) Lennox Ogutu	2	0	2
2	MF	(Kenya) Elvis Noor	1	0	1
15	FW	(Kenya) John Kamau	1	0	1
21	MF	(Kenya) Oliver Maloba	1	0	1
25	DF	(Kenya) Kenedy Onyango	1	0	1
26	DF	(Kenya) Dennis Wanjala	1	0	1
29	FW	(Kenya) Augustine Kuta	1	0	1
31	FW	(Kenya) Mohammed Bajaber	1	0	1
Opponent			1	0	1
Totals			45	0	45

Source: Nairobi City Stars

=== Clean sheets ===
Rank	No.	Pos.	Player	Premier League	Betway Cup	Total
1	23	GK	(Kenya) Jacob Osano	13	0	13
2	16	GK	(Kenya) Stephen Njunge	1	0	1
3	1	GK	(Kenya) Elvis Ochoro	0	0	0
Totals				14	0	14

=== Discipline ===
No.	Pos.	Player	Premier League			Betway Cup			Total		
No.	Pos.	Player	Booked	(yellow card) (yellow-red card)	Sent off (straight red)	Booked	(yellow card) (yellow-red card)	Sent off (straight red)	Booked	(yellow card) (yellow-red card)	Sent off (straight red)
1	GK	(Kenya) Elvis Ochoro	0	0	0	0	0	0	0	0	0
2	MF	(Kenya) Elvis Noor	2	0	0	0	0	0	2	0	0
3	MF	(Kenya) Charles Otieno	2	0	0	0	0	0	2	0	0
4	DF	(Kenya) Salim Abdalla	4	0	0	0	0	0	4	0	0
5	DF	(Kenya) Michael Madoya	0	0	0	0	0	0	0	0	0
6	DF	(Kenya) Ronney Kola	0	0	0	0	0	0	0	0	0
7	FW	(Kenya) Rodgers Okumu	2	0	0	0	0	0	2	0	0
8	DF	(Kenya) Calvin Masawa	1	0	0	0	0	0	1	0	0
9	FW	(Kenya) Vincent Otieno	0	0	0	0	0	0	0	0	0
10	MF	(Kenya) Peter Opiyo	0	0	0	0	0	0	0	0	0
11	FW	(Kenya) Davis Agesa	2	0	0	0	0	0	2	0	0
12	DF	(Kenya) Edwin Buliba	2	0	0	0	0	0	2	0	0
14	MF	(Kenya) Rowland Makati	0	0	0	0	0	0	0	0	0
15	FW	(Kenya) John Kamau John	2	0	0	0	0	0	2	0	0
16	GK	(Kenya) Jacob Osano	2	0	0	0	0	0	2	0	0
17	FW	(Kenya) Nicholas Kipkirui	0	0	0	0	0	0	0	0	0
18	MF	(Kenya) Sven Yida	9	0	0	0	0	0	9	0	0
19	DF	(Kenya) Kevin Okumu	6	0	0	0	0	0	6	0	0
20	MF	(Kenya) Timothy Ouma	6	0	0	0	0	0	6	0	0
21	MF	(Kenya) Oliver Maloba	2	0	0	0	0	0	2	0	0
22	DF	(Kenya) Wycliffe Onyango	0	0	0	0	0	0	0	0	0
23	MF	(Kenya) Stephen Njunge	0	0	0	0	0	0	0	0	0
24	FW	(Kenya) Erick Ombija	3	0	0	0	0	0	3	0	0
25	DF	(Kenya) Kenedy Onyango	8	0	0	0	0	0	8	0	0
26	DF	(Kenya) Dennis Wanjala	0	0	0	0	0	0	0	0	0
27	MF	(Kenya) Lennox Ogutu	0	0	0	0	0	0	0	0	0
28	DF	(Kenya) Herit Mungai	0	0	0	0	0	0	0	0	0
29	FW	(Kenya) Augustine Kuta	0	0	0	0	0	0	0	0	0
30	MF	(Kenya) Anthony Kimani	4	0	1	0	0	0	4	0	1
31	FW	(Kenya) Mohammed Bajaber	0	0	0	0	0	0	0	0	0
32	FW	(Kenya) Ezekiel Odera	5	0	1	0	0	0	5	0	1
Players who left the club
29	ST	(The Gambia) Ebrimah Sanneh	0	0	0	0	0	0	0	0	0
Totals			64	0	2	13	0	1	64	0	2

Source: Nairobi City Stars
