= Osano =

Osano is a surname. Notable people with the surname include:

- Curtis Osano (born 1987), Kenyan footballer
- Jacob Osano (born 1994), Kenyan footballer
- Thomas Osano (born 1970), Kenyan long-distance runner
