= 2019 U-23 Africa Cup of Nations qualification =

2019 Africa U-23 Cup of Nations qualification
Tournament details
- Dates: 12 November 2018 – 10 September 2019
- Teams: 43 (from 1 confederation)

Tournament statistics
- Matches played: 66
- Goals scored: 157 (2.38 per match)
- Top scorer(s): (Zambia) Fashion Sakala (5 goals)

The 2019 Africa U-23 Cup of Nations qualification was a men's under-23 football competition, which decided the participating teams of the 2019 Africa U-23 Cup of Nations.

Players born 1 January 1997 or later were eligible to participate in the competition. A total of eight teams qualified to play in the final tournament, including Egypt who qualified automatically as hosts. These matches also served as the first stage of the CAF qualifiers for the 2020 Summer Olympics men's football tournament in Japan.

== Teams ==
Apart from Egypt, the remaining 53 members of CAF were eligible to enter the qualifying competition, and a total of 43 national teams were in the qualifying draw, which was announced on 2 October 2018. The 13 teams which had the best performance in the 2015 Africa U-23 Cup of Nations final tournament and qualifying competition were given a bye to the second round.

Final tournament hosts	Bye to second round (13 teams)	First round entrants (30 teams)
**Egypt**	Algeria; Congo; Gabon; **Ivory Coast**; **Mali**; Morocco; **Nigeria**; Senegal; Sierra Leone **(D)**; **South Africa**; Tunisia; **Zambia**; Zimbabwe	Angola; Botswana; Burkina Faso; Burundi; **Cameroon**; Chad; DR Congo **(D)**; Equatorial Guinea; Eswatini; Ethiopia; Gambia **(W)**; **Ghana**; Guinea; Kenya; Libya; Malawi; Mauritania; Mauritius; Mozambique; Namibia **(W)**; Niger; Rwanda; São Tomé and Príncipe; Seychelles; Somalia; South Sudan; Sudan; Tanzania; Togo; Uganda

Notes

- Teams in **bold** qualified for the final tournament.
- (D): Disqualified after draw
- (W): Withdrew after draw

Did not enter

- Benin
- Cape Verde
- Central African Republic
- Comoros
- Djibouti
- Eritrea
- Guinea-Bissau
- Lesotho
- Liberia
- Madagascar

== Format ==
Qualification ties were played on a home-and-away, two-legged basis. If the aggregate score was tied after the second leg, away goals rule was applied, and if still tied, penalty shoot-out (no extra time) was used to determine the winner.

== Schedule ==
The schedule of the qualifying rounds was as follows. All matches were played during the FIFA International Window. The third round was originally scheduled for 3–11 June 2019 but was rescheduled to 2–10 September 2019 due to the proximity of its initial dates to the 2019 Africa Cup of Nations between 21 June and 19 July.

Round	Leg	Date
First round	First leg	12–20 November 2018
First round	Second leg	12–20 November 2018
Second round	First leg	18–26 March 2019
Second round	Second leg	18–26 March 2019
Third round	First leg	2–10 September 2019
Third round	Second leg	2–10 September 2019

== Bracket ==
The bracket of the draw was announced by the CAF on 2 October 2018.

The seven winners of the third round qualified for the final tournament.

First round
Angola	—	—	w/o
Namibia	—	—
Mozambique (a)	0	1	1
Eswatini	0	1	1

Second round
Angola	1	0	1
South Africa	3	3	6
Mozambique	0	0	0
Zimbabwe	0	2	2

Third round
South Africa	5	0	5
Zimbabwe	0	0	0

First round
Botswana	1	1	2
Malawi	2	1	3
Burundi (a)	2	1	3
Tanzania	0	3	3

Second round
Malawi	0	0	0
Zambia	1	1	2
Burundi	0	1	1
Congo	0	2	2

Third round
Zambia	2	3	5
Congo	1	3	4

First round
Ghana	5	0	5
Togo	1	1	2
Equatorial Guinea	1	3	4
São Tomé and Príncipe	1	1	2

Second round
Ghana	4	0	4
Gabon	0	0	0
Equatorial Guinea	0	1	1
Algeria	0	3	3

Third round
Ghana	1	1	2
Algeria	1	0	1

First round
Cameroon	3	1	4
Chad	0	1	1
Uganda	1	0	1
South Sudan	0	2	2

Second round
Cameroon	—	—	w/o
Sierra Leone	—	—
South Sudan	0	0	0
Tunisia	0	1	1

Third round
Cameroon (a)	1	1	2
Tunisia	0	2	2

First round
Burkina Faso	1	1	2
Niger	1	3	4
Mauritania	1	1	2
Guinea	2	4	6

Second round
Niger	1	1	2
Ivory Coast	2	6	8
Guinea	2	0	2
Senegal	1	0	1

Third round
Ivory Coast (a)	0	2	2
Guinea	1	1	2

First round
Seychelles	1	0	1
Sudan	1	1	2
Kenya	5	3	8
Mauritius	0	1	1
Libya	—	—	w/o
Gambia	—	—

Second round
Sudan	2	0	2
Kenya	0	0	0
Libya	2	0	2
Nigeria	0	4	4

Third round
Sudan	1	0	1
Nigeria	0	5	5

First round
Rwanda	0	0	0
DR Congo	0	5	5
Ethiopia	4	0	4
Somalia	0	1	1

Second round
DR Congo (Note: DR Congo were disqualified for fielding an ineligible (overaged) player.)	2	0	~~2~~
Morocco	0	1	~~1~~ w/o
Ethiopia	1	0	1
Mali	1	4	5

Third round
Morocco	1	0	1
Mali	1	1	2

== First round ==
Team 1	Agg.	Team 2	1st leg	2nd leg
Angola	w/o	Namibia	—	—
Mozambique	1–1 (a)	Eswatini	0–0	1–1
Botswana	2–3	Malawi	1–2	1–1
Burundi	3–3 (a)	Tanzania	2–0	1–3
Ghana	5–2	Togo	5–1	0–1
Equatorial Guinea	4–2	São Tomé and Príncipe	1–1	3–1
Cameroon	4–1	Chad	3–0	1–1
Uganda	1–2	South Sudan	1–0	0–2
Burkina Faso	2–4	Niger	1–1	1–3
Mauritania	2–6	Guinea	1–2	1–4
Seychelles	1–2	Sudan	1–1	0–1
Kenya	8–1	Mauritius	5–0	3–1
Libya	w/o	Gambia	—	—
Rwanda	0–5	DR Congo	0–0	0–5
Ethiopia	4–1	Somalia	4–0	0–1

16 November 2018
16:00 UTC+1

Angola	Cancelled	Namibia
	Report

Estádio 11 de Novembro, Luanda
Referee: Blaise Ngwa (Cameroon)
20 November 2018
19:00 UTC+2

Namibia	Cancelled	Angola
	Report

Sam Nujoma Stadium, Windhoek
Referee: Lazard Tsiba (Congo)

Angola won on walkover after Namibia withdrew.

16 November 2018
18:00 UTC+2

Mozambique	0–0	Eswatini
	Report

Estádio do Zimpeto, Maputo
Referee: Georges Gatogato (Burundi)
20 November 2018
15:00 UTC+2

Eswatini	1–1	Mozambique
G. Dlamini 33'	Report	Bonera 61'

Mavuso Sports Centre, Manzini
Referee: Tirelo Mositwane (Botswana)

1–1 on aggregate. Mozambique won on away goals.

17 November 2018
16:00 UTC+2

Botswana	1–2	Malawi
Johnson 61'	Report	Legopelo 85' (o.g.); Nachipo 88'

Botswana National Stadium, Gaborone
Referee: Thando Ndzandzeka (South Africa)
20 November 2018
14:30 UTC+2

Malawi	1–1	Botswana
Banda 66'	Report	Gaogangwe 90+4'

Kamuzu Stadium, Blantyre
Referee: Celso Alvação (Mozambique)

Malawi won 3–2 on aggregate.

14 November 2018
15:00 UTC+2

Burundi	2–0	Tanzania
Mabano 60' (pen.); Mavugo 78'	Report

Prince Louis Rwagasore Stadium, Bujumbura
Referee: Tsegay Mogos (Eritrea)
20 November 2018
19:00 UTC+3

Tanzania	3–1	Burundi
Kyombo 4'; Yusuph 43'; Kiimbwa 70'	Report	Mavugo 89'

National Stadium, Dar es Salaam
Referee: Diraneh Guedi (Djibouti)

3–3 on aggregate. Burundi won on away goals.

18 December 2018 (Note: The matches between Ghana and Togo, originally scheduled for 16 and 20 November 2018, were postponed to 18 and 22 December 2018 due to Ghana hosting the 2018 Africa Women Cup of Nations.)
15:30 UTC+0

Ghana	5–1	Togo
Kwabena 18', 69', 70'; Bukari 60'; Yakubu 82'	Report	Klidje 32'

Baba Yara Stadium, Kumasi
Referee: Issa Sy (Senegal)
22 December 2018
16:00 UTC+0

Togo	1–0	Ghana
Anika 19'	Report

Stade Municipal, Lomé
Referee: Beida Dahane (Mauritania)

Ghana won 5–2 on aggregate.

14 November 2018
18:00 UTC+1

Equatorial Guinea	1–1	São Tomé and Príncipe
Eneme 45'	Report	Gilson 3'

Estadio de Malabo, Malabo
Referee: Mohamed Ali Moussa (Niger)
20 November 2018
15:00 UTC+1

São Tomé and Príncipe	1–3	Equatorial Guinea
Gilson 34'	Report	Oba 4', 58'; Ndong 21'

Estádio Nacional 12 de Julho, São Tomé
Referee: Fabricio Duarte (Cape Verde)

Equatorial Guinea won 4–2 on aggregate.

16 November 2018
15:30 UTC+1

Cameroon	3–0	Chad
Hongla 10'; Ayuk 49', 65'	Report

Stade Ahmadou Ahidjo, Yaoundé
Referee: Pierre Atcho (Gabon)
20 November 2018
15:00 UTC+1

Chad	1–1	Cameroon
Nodji 29'	Report	Ngan 18'

Stade Omnisports Idriss Mahamat Ouya, N'Djamena
Referee: Adissa Ligali (Benin)

Cameroon won 4–1 on aggregate.

14 November 2018
16:30 UTC+3

Uganda	1–0	South Sudan
Kizza 90+2' (pen.)	Report

Phillip Omondi Stadium, Kampala
Referee: Ahmed Hassan (Egypt)
20 November 2018
16:00 UTC+3

South Sudan	2–0	Uganda
Taku 23'; Wol 89'	Report

Juba Stadium, Juba
Referee: Omar Artan (Somalia)

South Sudan won 2–1 on aggregate.

16 November 2018
18:00 UTC+0

Burkina Faso	1–1	Niger
Badolo 34'	Report	Hanhainikoye 27' (pen.)

Stade du 4 Août, Ouagadougou
Referee: Nabil Boukhalfa (Algeria)
20 November 2018
16:00 UTC+1

Niger	3–1	Burkina Faso
Salou 45', 63'; Boubacar 74'	Report	Cissé 78'

Stade Général Seyni Kountché, Niamey
Referee: Quadri Adebimpe (Nigeria)

Niger won 4–2 on aggregate.

14 November 2018
17:00 UTC+0

Mauritania	1–2	Guinea
Teguedi 9'	Report	Ma. Traore 73'; D. Camara 90'

Stade Cheikha Ould Boïdiya, Nouakchott
Referee: Samir Guezzaz (Morocco)
20 November 2018
16:30 UTC+0

Guinea	4–1	Mauritania
Keita 12'; D. Camara 25'; Y. Camara 38', 43'	Report	Traoré 16'

Stade du 28 Septembre, Conakry
Referee: Daniel Laryea (Ghana)

Guinea won 6–2 on aggregate.

14 November 2018
17:30 UTC+4

Seychelles	1–1	Sudan
Henriette 8'	Report	Waleed 15'

Stade Linité, Victoria
Referee: Tewodros Mitiku (Ethiopia)
20 November 2018
19:30 UTC+2

Sudan	1–0	Seychelles
Fanchette 48' (o.g.)	Report

Khartoum Stadium, Khartoum
Referee: Ali Sabilla (Uganda)

Sudan won 2–1 on aggregate.

14 November 2018
16:00 UTC+3

Kenya	5–0	Mauritius
Omurwa 12'; Mazembe 30'; Mutamba 54'; Lokale 56'; Okumu 71'	Report

Moi International Sports Centre, Nairobi
Referee: Nsoro Ruzindana (Rwanda)
18 November 2018
15:00 UTC+4

Mauritius	1–3	Kenya
Langue 87'	Report	Mutamba 40'; O. Ochieng 57'; Mazembe 66'

Anjalay Stadium, Belle Vue Maurel
Referee: Andofetra Rakotojaona (Madagascar)

Kenya won 8–1 on aggregate.

14 November 2018

Libya	Cancelled	Gambia
	Report

18 November 2018

Gambia	Cancelled	Libya
	Report

Libya won on walkover after Gambia withdrew.

14 November 2018
15:30 UTC+2

Rwanda	0–0	DR Congo
	Report

Umuganda Stadium, Gisenyi
Referee: Kalilou Traoré (Ivory Coast)
20 November 2018
16:00 UTC+1

DR Congo	5–0	Rwanda
Mbuangi 7'; Muleka 32', 67'; Mutumosi 61'; Balongo 83'	Report

Stade des Martyrs, Kinshasa
Referee: Peter Waweru (Kenya)

DR Congo won 5–0 on aggregate.

14 November 2018
16:00 UTC+3

Ethiopia	4–0	Somalia
Markneh 28'; Eshetu 39'; Gebremichael 66' (pen.); Sani 70'	Report

Addis Ababa Stadium, Addis Ababa
Referee: Haythem Guirat (Tunisia)
20 November 2018
15:30 UTC+3

Somalia	1–0	Ethiopia
F. Hassan 14'	Report

El Hadj Hassan Gouled Aptidon Stadium, Djibouti (Djibouti) (Note: Somalia played their home leg in Djibouti due to the Somali Civil War.)
Referee: Elsiddig El Treefe (Sudan)

Ethiopia won 4–1 on aggregate.

== Second round ==
Team 1	Agg.	Team 2	1st leg	2nd leg
Angola	1–6	South Africa	1–3	0–3
Mozambique	0–2	Zimbabwe	0–0	0–2
Malawi	0–2	Zambia	0–1	0–1
Burundi	1–2	Congo	0–0	1–2
Ghana	4–0	Gabon	4–0	0–0
Equatorial Guinea	1–3	Algeria	0–0	1–3
Cameroon	w/o	Sierra Leone	—	—
South Sudan	0–1	Tunisia	0–0	0–1
Niger	2–8	Ivory Coast	1–2	1–6
Guinea	2–1	Senegal	2–1	0–0
Sudan	2–0	Kenya	2–0	0–0
Libya	2–4	Nigeria	2–0	0–4
DR Congo	~~2–1~~ w/o	Morocco	2–0	0–1
Ethiopia	1–5	Mali	1–1	0–4

22 March 2019
16:00 UTC+1

Angola	1–3	South Africa
Teixeira 87'	Report	Mahlambi 7'; Mukumela 16'; Margeman 62'

Estádio 11 de Novembro, Luanda
Referee: Lebalang Mokete (Lesotho)
26 March 2019
19:00 UTC+2

South Africa	3–0	Angola
Webber 10'; Mokoena 80'; Singh 90+2'	Report

Bidvest Stadium, Johannesburg
Referee: Audrick Nkole (Zambia)

South Africa won 6–1 on aggregate.

22 March 2019
16:00 UTC+2

Mozambique	0–0	Zimbabwe
	Report

Estádio do Zimpeto, Maputo
Referee: Attisso Attiogbe (Togo)
26 March 2019
15:00 UTC+2

Zimbabwe	2–0	Mozambique
Chirinda 88'; Murimba 90+4'	Report

National Sports Stadium, Harare
Referee: Thulani Sibandze (Eswatini)

Zimbabwe won 2–0 on aggregate.

20 March 2019
14:30 UTC+2

Malawi	0–1	Zambia
	Report	F. Sakala 77'

Kamuzu Stadium, Blantyre
Referee: Imtehaz Heeralall (Mauritius)
24 March 2019
15:00 UTC+2

Zambia	1–0	Malawi
F. Sakala 40'	Report

National Heroes Stadium, Lusaka
Referee: Blaise Ngwa (Cameroon)

Zambia won 2–0 on aggregate.

20 March 2019
15:00 UTC+2

Burundi	0–0	Congo
	Report

Prince Louis Rwagasore Stadium, Bujumbura
Referee: Celso Alvação (Mozambique)
26 March 2019
15:30 UTC+1

Congo	2–1	Burundi
Matondo 90'; Mbenza 90+4' (pen.)	Report	Kanakimana 21'

Stade Alphonse Massemba-Débat, Brazzaville
Referee: Nomore Musundire (Zimbabwe)

Congo won 2–1 on aggregate.

23 March 2019
15:00 UTC+0

Ghana	4–0	Gabon
Kwabena 15'; Tekpetey 49'; Bukari 75', 86'	Report

Accra Sports Stadium, Accra
Referee: Jean-Marc Ganamandji (Central African Republic)
26 March 2019
15:30 UTC+1

Gabon	0–0	Ghana
	Report

Stade Augustin Monédan de Sibang, Libreville
Referee: Kalilou Traoré (Ivory Coast)

Ghana won 4–0 on aggregate.

23 March 2019
18:00 UTC+1

Equatorial Guinea	0–0	Algeria
	Report

Estadio de Malabo, Malabo
Referee: Abdoulaye Rhissa (Niger)
26 March 2019
17:00 UTC+1

Algeria	3–1	Equatorial Guinea
Zorgane 35'; Benhammouda 59'; Mahious 77' (pen.)	Report	S. Obama 90+4'

Stade du 5 Juillet 1962, Algiers
Referee: Louis Houngnandande (Benin)

Algeria won 3–1 on aggregate.

21 March 2019
15:30 UTC+1

Cameroon	Cancelled	Sierra Leone
	Report

Stade Ahmadou Ahidjo, Yaoundé
24 March 2019

Sierra Leone	Cancelled	Cameroon
	Report

Cameroon won on walkover due to FIFA's suspension of the Sierra Leone Football Association.

20 March 2019
16:00 UTC+3

South Sudan	0–0	Tunisia
	Report

Juba Stadium, Juba
Referee: Omar Artan (Somalia)
24 March 2019
15:00 UTC+1

Tunisia	1–0	South Sudan
Hnid 60'	Report

Stade du 7 Mars, Ben Gardane
Referee: Abdulwahid Huraywidah (Libya)

Tunisia won 1–0 on aggregate.

22 March 2019
16:30 UTC+1

Niger	1–2	Ivory Coast
Sabo 58'	Report	Niangbo 23'; Sangaré 74'

Stade Général Seyni Kountché, Niamey
Referee: Alhadi Mahamat (Chad)
25 March 2019
17:00 UTC+0

Ivory Coast	6–1	Niger
I. Amadou 5' (o.g.); Braciano 15', 56'; Kouamé 40'; Dao 65'; Timité 88' (pen.)	Report	Amoustapha 21'

Stade Félix Houphouët-Boigny, Abidjan
Referee: Bashir Salisu (Nigeria)

Ivory Coast won 8–2 on aggregate.

20 March 2019
16:30 UTC+0

Guinea	2–1	Senegal
Keita 33' (pen.); Mor. Sylla 48'	Report	Id. Ndiaye 38'

Stade du 28 Septembre, Conakry
Referee: Fitial Kokolo (Congo)
24 March 2019
18:00 UTC+0

Senegal	0–0	Guinea
	Report

Stade Lat Dior, Thiès
Referee: Babacar Sarr (Mauritania)

Guinea won 2–1 on aggregate.

20 March 2019
19:00 UTC+2

Sudan	2–0	Kenya
Waleed 32', 75' (pen.)	Report

Al-Merrikh Stadium, Omdurman
Referee: Ibrahim Nour El Din (Egypt)
26 March 2019
16:00 UTC+3

Kenya	0–0	Sudan
	Report

Moi International Sports Centre, Kasarani
Referee: Andofetra Rakotojaona (Madagascar)

Sudan won 2–0 on aggregate.

20 March 2019
16:00 UTC+1

Libya	2–0	Nigeria
Alharaish 5'; Albedwi 68'	Report

Stade du 7 Mars, Ben Gardane (Tunisia) (Note: Libya played their home leg in Tunisia due to the Libyan Civil War.)
Referee: Daniel Laryea (Ghana)
25 March 2019
16:00 UTC+1

Nigeria	4–0	Libya
Osimhen 32', 65', 81'; Okereke 90+2'	Report

Stephen Keshi Stadium, Asaba
Referee: Anthony Ogwayo (Kenya)

Nigeria won 4–2 on aggregate.

20 March 2019
15:30 UTC+1

DR Congo	2–0	Morocco
Muleka 40', 66'	Report

Stade des Martyrs, Kinshasa
Referee: Eric Otogo-Castane (Gabon)
24 March 2019
19:00 UTC+1

Morocco	1–0	DR Congo
Kiyine 28' (pen.)	Report

Prince Moulay Abdellah Stadium, Rabat
Referee: Louis Hakizimana (Rwanda)

DR Congo won 2–1 on aggregate. However, they were later disqualified for fielding an ineligible (overaged) player, and Morocco won on walkover.

21 March 2019
16:00 UTC+3

Ethiopia	1–1	Mali
Demu 72'	Report	Samadiaré 52'

Addis Ababa Stadium, Addis Ababa
Referee: Jackson Pavaza (Namibia)
26 March 2019
17:00 UTC+0

Mali	4–0	Ethiopia
Samadiaré 38' (pen.); Bagayoko 82'; Dieng 86'; Doumbia 90+2'	Report

Stade Modibo Kéïta, Bamako
Referee: Gilberto Dos Santos (Guinea-Bissau)

Mali won 5–1 on aggregate.

== Third round ==
Winners qualified for 2019 Africa U-23 Cup of Nations.

Team 1	Agg.	Team 2	1st leg	2nd leg
South Africa	5–0	Zimbabwe	5–0	0–0
Zambia	5–4	Congo	2–1	3–3
Ghana	2–1	Algeria	1–1	1–0
Cameroon	2–2 (a)	Tunisia	1–0	1–2
Ivory Coast	2–2 (a)	Guinea	0–1	2–1
Sudan	1–5	Nigeria	1–0	0–5
Morocco	1–2	Mali	1–1	0–1

6 September 2019
19:00 UTC+2

South Africa	5–0	Zimbabwe
Kodisang 17'; Singh 35', 60'; Mokoena 40'; Foster 66'	Report

Orlando Stadium, Johannesburg
Referee: António Caluassi Dungula (Angola)
10 September 2019
15:00 UTC+2

Zimbabwe	0–0	South Africa
	Report

Barbourfields Stadium, Bulawayo
Referee: Tshepo Mokani Gobagoba (Botswana)

South Africa won 5–0 on aggregate.

4 September 2019
18:00 UTC+2

Zambia	2–1	Congo
F. Sakala 7', 88'	Report	Thémopolé 47'

National Heroes Stadium, Lusaka
Referee: Ibrahim Ben Tsimanohitsy (Madagascar)
8 September 2019
15:30 UTC+1

Congo	3–3	Zambia
Mbenza 18' (pen.); Thémopolé 75'; Makouta 80'	Report	Mwepu 33', 85'; F. Sakala 51'

Stade Alphonse Massemba-Débat, Brazzaville
Referee: Isidore Essono Nze (Gabon)

Zambia won 5–4 on aggregate.

6 September 2019
15:30 UTC+0

Ghana	1–1	Algeria
Mohammed 66' (pen.)	Report	Zorgane 31'

Accra Sports Stadium, Accra
Referee: Kouassi Frederic Francois Biro (Ivory Coast)
10 September 2019
20:45 UTC+1

Algeria	0–1	Ghana
	Report	Yeboah 69'

Stade 8 Mai 1945, Sétif
Referee: Jalal Jayed (Morocco)

Ghana won 2–1 on aggregate.

6 September 2019
15:30 UTC+1

Cameroon	1–0	Tunisia
Ekani 19'	Report

Stade Ahmadou Ahidjo, Yaoundé
Referee: Fitial Charel Just Kokolo (Congo)
10 September 2019
19:00 UTC+1

Tunisia	2–1	Cameroon
Sahli 37'; Oueslati 71' (pen.)	Report	Ganago 15' (pen.)

Stade Olympique de Radès, Radès
Referee: Mohamed Adel Elsaid Hussien (Egypt)

2–2 on aggregate. Cameroon won on away goals.

7 September 2019
17:00 UTC+0

Ivory Coast	0–1	Guinea
	Report	Mor. Sylla 63'

Stade Félix Houphouët-Boigny, Abidjan
Referee: Yelebodom Gado Mawabwe Bodjona (Togo)
10 September 2019
16:00 UTC+0

Guinea	1–2	Ivory Coast
Mo. Traoré 35'	Report	Kouamé 17'; Traorè 63'

Stade du 28 Septembre, Conakry
Referee: Jerry Yekeh (Liberia)

2–2 on aggregate. Ivory Coast won on away goals.

5 September 2019
19:00 UTC+2

Sudan	1–0	Nigeria
Yaqoub 45'	Report

Al-Merrikh Stadium, Omdurman
Referee: Souleiman Ahmed Djama (Djibouti)
10 September 2019
16:00 UTC+1

Nigeria	5–0	Sudan
Awoniyi 13'; Udo 25', 44'; Faleye 67'; Ibrahim 69'	Report

Stephen Keshi Stadium, Asaba
Referee: Bangaly Konaté (Guinea)

Nigeria won 5–1 on aggregate.

7 September 2019
20:00 UTC+1

Morocco	1–1	Mali
En-Nesyri 49'	Report	Koné 31'

Stade de Marrakech, Marrakesh
Referee: Daouda Guèye (Senegal)
10 September 2019
16:30 UTC+0

Mali	1–0	Morocco
Mallé 56' (pen.)	Report

Stade Modibo Kéïta, Bamako
Referee: Omar Sallah (Gambia)

Mali won 2–1 on aggregate.

== Qualified teams ==
The following eight teams qualified for the final tournament.

Team	Qualified on	Previous appearances in Africa U-23 Cup of Nations^{1}
Egypt (hosts)	23 June 2017	2 (2011, 2015)
South Africa	10 September 2019	2 (2011, 2015)
Zambia	8 September 2019	1 (2015)
Ghana	10 September 2019	0 (debut)
Cameroon	10 September 2019	0 (debut)
Ivory Coast	10 September 2019	1 (2011)
Nigeria	10 September 2019	2 (2011, **2015**)
Mali	10 September 2019	1 (2015)

^{1} Bold indicates champions for that year. Italic indicates hosts for that year.

== Goalscorers ==
There were 157 goals scored in 66 matches, for an average of 2.38 goals per match.

5 goals

- (Zambia) Fashion Sakala

4 goals

- (Democratic Republic of the Congo) Jackson Muleka
- (Ghana) Owusu Kwabena

3 goals

- (Ghana) Osman Bukari
- (Nigeria) Victor Osimhen
- (South Africa) Luther Singh
- (Sudan) Waleed Bakhet

2 goals

- (Algeria) Adem Zorgane
- (Burundi) Cédric Mavugo
- (Cameroon) Eric Ayuk
- (Republic of the Congo) Guy Mbenza
- (Republic of the Congo) Jacques Thémopolé
- (Equatorial Guinea) Pedro Oba
- (Guinea) Daouda Camara
- (Guinea) Yamoussa Camara
- (Guinea) Jules Keita
- (Guinea) Morlaye Sylla
- (Ivory Coast) Willy Braciano
- (Ivory Coast) Christian Kouamé
- (Kenya) James Mazembe
- (Kenya) Pistone Mutamba
- (Mali) Diadié Samadiaré
- (Niger) Abdoulaye Salou
- (Nigeria) Ndifreke Udo
- (São Tomé and Príncipe) Gilson
- (South Africa) Teboho Mokoena
- (Zambia) Enock Mwepu

1 goal

- (Angola) Jaredi Teixeira
- (Algeria) Billel Benhammouda
- (Algeria) Aymen Mahious
- (Botswana) Gape Gaogangwe
- (Botswana) Mothusi Johnson
- (Burkina Faso) Cédric Badolo
- (Burkina Faso) Mody Cissé
- (Burundi) Bienvenue Kanakimana
- (Burundi) Muryango Mabano
- (Cameroon) Victor Ekani
- (Cameroon) Ignatius Ganago
- (Cameroon) Martin Hongla
- (Cameroon) Hervé Ngan
- (Chad) Gerald Nodji
- (Republic of the Congo) Gaius Makouta
- (Republic of the Congo) Chandrel Matondo
- (Democratic Republic of the Congo) Nelson Balongo
- (Democratic Republic of the Congo) Ginola Mbuangi
- (Democratic Republic of the Congo) Peter Mutumosi
- (Equatorial Guinea) Santiago Eneme
- (Equatorial Guinea) Benjamín Ndong
- (Equatorial Guinea) Salomón Obama
- (Eswatini) Gcinwayinkhosi Dlamini
- (Ethiopia) Desta Demu
- (Ethiopia) Esrael Eshetu
- (Ethiopia) Amanuel Gebremichael
- (Ethiopia) Kenean Markneh
- (Ethiopia) Abubeker Sani
- (Ghana) Dauda Mohammed
- (Ghana) Bernard Tekpetey
- (Ghana) Nassam Yakubu
- (Ghana) Yaw Yeboah
- (Guinea) Mai Traoré
- (Guinea) Moussa Corso Traoré
- (Ivory Coast) Youssouf Dao
- (Ivory Coast) Anderson Niangbo
- (Ivory Coast) Ibrahim Sangaré
- (Ivory Coast) Cheick Timité
- (Ivory Coast) Hamed Junior Traorè
- (Kenya) Sydney Lokale
- (Kenya) Ovella Ochieng
- (Kenya) Joseph Okumu
- (Kenya) Johnstone Omurwa
- (Libya) Osama Albedwi
- (Libya) Zakaria Alharaish
- (Malawi) Peter Banda
- (Malawi) Gregory Nachipo
- (Mali) Siaka Bagayoko
- (Mali) Aliou Dieng
- (Mali) Bourama Doumbia
- (Mali) Ibrahima Koné
- (Mali) Aly Mallé
- (Mauritania) Hassem Teguedi
- (Mauritania) Fody Traoré
- (Mauritius) Adel Langue
- (Morocco) Youssef En-Nesyri
- (Morocco) Sofian Kiyine
- (Mozambique) Bonera
- (Niger) Kairou Amoustapha
- (Niger) Djibril Boubacar
- (Niger) Aboubacar Hanhainikoye
- (Niger) Mahamadou Sabo
- (Nigeria) Taiwo Awoniyi
- (Nigeria) Sunday Faleye
- (Nigeria) Sunusi Ibrahim
- (Nigeria) David Okereke
- (Senegal) Ibrahima Ndiaye
- (Seychelles) Ryan Henriette
- (Somalia) Feisal Ahmed Hassan
- (South Africa) Lyle Foster
- (South Africa) Kobamelo Kodisang
- (South Africa) Phakamani Mahlambi
- (South Africa) Grant Margeman
- (South Africa) Thendo Mukumela
- (South Africa) Jamie Webber
- (South Sudan) Peter Taku
- (South Sudan) Makueth Wol
- (Sudan) Walaa Eldin Yaqoub
- (Tanzania) Salumu Kiimbwa
- (Tanzania) Habib Kyombo
- (Tanzania) Mbaraka Yusuph
- (Togo) Kossi Anika
- (Togo) Thibault Klidjé
- (Tunisia) Nassim Hnid
- (Tunisia) Habib Oueslati
- (Tunisia) Wajdi Sahli
- (Uganda) Mustafa Kizza
- (Zimbabwe) Obriel Chirinda
- (Zimbabwe) Delic Murimba

1 own goal

- (Botswana) Goitseone Legopelo (against Malawi)
- (Niger) Inoussa Amadou (against Ivory Coast)
- (Seychelles) Don Fanchette (against Sudan)
