= Hassan Gesey =

Somali footballer

Personal information
- Full name: Hassan Abdinur Gesey
- Date of birth: 5 May 1998 (age 28)
- Place of birth: Somalia
- Position: Midfielder

Team information
- Current team: Gaadiidka

Senior career*
Years	Team	Apps	(Gls)
- Jeenyo United
2019–2021	Horseed		
2021–	Gaadiidka		

International career^{‡}
2015	Somalia U20		
2015	Somalia U23	1	(0)
2015–	Somalia	7	(0)
- * Club domestic league appearances and goals as of 21:00, 12 December 2019 (UTC) ‡ National team caps and goals as of 21:00, 12 December 2019 (UTC)

Hassan Abdinur Gesey (Somali: Xasan Cabdinuur Geeseey; born 5 May 1998) is a Somali footballer who plays as a midfielder for Gaadiidka and the Somalia national team.

== Club career ==
In 2019, Gesey signed for Horseed after previously playing for Jeenyo United. In 2021, Gesey signed for Gaadiidka.

== International career ==
In April 2015, Gesey was called up for the Somalia under-23 team to play Rwanda U23.

On 22 November 2015, Gesey made his debut for Somalia in a 4–0 loss against Tanzania in the 2015 CECAFA Cup.
