= Hassan Ibrahim Ali =

Somali footballer (born 1996)

Personal information
- Date of birth: 4 November 1996 (age 29)
- Position: Goalkeeper

Team information
- Current team: Dekedaha

Senior career*
Years	Team	Apps	(Gls)
- Savana
2019–	Dekedaha		

International career^{‡}
- Somalia U23
2015–	Somalia	2	(0)
- * Club domestic league appearances and goals as of 19:53, 28 June 2021 (UTC) ‡ National team caps and goals as of 20:00, 14 September 2019 (UTC)

Hassan Ibrahim Ali (born 4 November 1996) is a Somali footballer who plays as a goalkeeper for Dekedaha and the Somalia national football team.

== Club career ==
As of 2014, Ali was playing for Savana. In 2019, Ali signed for Dekedaha, winning the Somali First Division in his first season at the club.

== International career ==
After previously representing Somalia at under-23 level, Ali made his debut for Somalia in a 3–0 loss against Rwanda in the 2015 CECAFA Cup.
