= James Mazembe =

Kenyan footballer (born 1998)

James Ogachi Mazembe
Personal information
- Full name: James Ogachi Mazembe
- Date of birth: 2 May 1998 (age 28)
- Place of birth: Kericho
- Height: 1.70 m (5 ft 7 in)
- Position: Winger

Youth career
- Ujuzi

Senior career*
Years	Team	Apps	(Gls)
2017-2020	F.C. Kariobangi Sharks	33	(5)
2021-23	KCB FC	21	(3)
2023-	→ Nairobi City Stars (loan)	4	(0)

International career^{‡}
2018	Kenya U23	6	(1)
2021–	Kenya	2	(0)
- * Club domestic league appearances and goals as of 19:38, 29 April 2023 (UTC) ‡ National team caps and goals as of 19:38, 29 April 2023 (UTC)

James Ogachi Mazembe is a Kenyan winger who currently features for Kenyan Premier League side Nairobi City Stars, and Kenya.

== Early life and career ==
Mazembe was born in Kericho on 2 May 1998 and went on to school at Kakamega High School. He joined the school team Green Commandoes then made a move to Kericho-based Zoo FC in the Kenyan Premier League in 2017, on loan. He then moved to Nairobi to feature for F.C. Kariobangi Sharks from July 2017.

After two years, Mazembe made a move to KCB FC till Mar 2023 when he switched to Nairobi City Stars albeit on loan.

== International career ==
While at F.C. Kariobangi Sharks, Mazembe received call-ups to Kenya's Olympic team, and Kenya senior team. His first call to the National team was while he was in high school in 2017.

He was called up to the Kenya U23 team for two friendly games away to Uzbekistan in Mar 2018. Later, he was part of the same team for home and away games against Mauritius in Nov 2023 during 2019 U-23 Africa Cup of Nations qualification ties.

He went on to feature in two full internationals against South Sudan and Tanzania in Nyayo Stadium in March 2021.

== Award ==
Mazembe was named the 2017 Airtel Rising Stars National Secondary Schools Term Two 'B' games MVP as Kakamega High won the title.
