= Michael Madoya =

Kenyan footballer (born 1989)

Michael Idovolo Madoya
Personal information
- Date of birth: 2 February 1989 (age 37)
- Place of birth: Kericho, Kenya
- Height: 1.65 m (5 ft 5 in)
- Position: Midfielder

Team information
- Current team: Nairobi City Stars
- Number: 5

Youth career
- Zoo FC

Senior career*
Years	Team	Apps	(Gls)
2016	Zoo FC	34	(20)
2017-18	Zoo FC	67	(21)
2018-19	Tusker F.C.	16	(4)
2019-20	Tusker F.C.	2	(2)
2020-21	Tusker F.C.	10	(2)
2021-22	Nairobi City Stars	9	(0)
- * Club domestic league appearances and goals as of 19:31, 15 March 2022 (UTC)

Michael Idovolo Madoya (born 2 February 1989) is a Kenyan footballer. He is a midfielder with Kenyan Premier League side Nairobi City Stars.

== Career ==
Madoya started his Kenyan Premier League journey at Kericho-based Zoo FC where he was named the league's Most Valuable Player at the end of the 2017 Kenyan Premier League season. He then moved to Tusker F.C. on a three-year deal from 2018, with whom he won the 2020-21 title in his final season.

After his contract lapsed, Madoya moved to Nairobi City Stars for the 2020–21 Kenyan Premier League season. He was handed his City Stars debut by head coach Nicholas Muyoti on 24 Oct 2021 in Thika Stadium after coming on as a second-half substitute in a matchday six tie against Bidco United.

== Honours ==
=== Club ===
Tusker F.C.

- Kenyan Premier League

(gold) Champion (1): 2020/21

=== Individual ===
- National Super League

(gold) Top scorer (1): 2016 (Zoo FC)

- Kenyan Premier League

(gold) Player of the Month (1): June/July 2017 (Zoo FC)
(gold) Fair Play player of the Year (2): 2017, 2018 (Zoo FC)
(gold) Midfielder of the Year (1): 2017 (Zoo FC)
(gold) New Player of the Year (1): 2017 (Zoo FC)
(gold) Player of the Year (1): 2017 (Zoo FC)
(bronze) Midfielder of the Year - 2nd runners-up (1): 2018 (Zoo FC)
