= Josephat Lopaga =

Kenyan footballer (born 2002)

Personal information
- Date of birth: 12 August 2002 (age 24)
- Place of birth: Baragoi, Kenya
- Position: Striker

Youth career
- Shy Football Academy
- 2017–2019: Gor Mahia
- 2019–2020: Mt Kenya United

Senior career*
Years	Team	Apps	(Gls)
2020–2022	Posta Rangers		
2022–2023	A.F.C. Leopards		
2023	Dhofar		
2023–2024	Dynamo Brest	23	(5)
2024	→ Naftan Novopolotsk (loan)	12	(0)

International career
- Kenya U17
- Kenya U23
- * Club domestic league appearances and goals as of 4 December 2024

Josephat Lopaga (born 12 August 2002) is a Kenyan professional footballer who plays as a striker.

== Early life ==
Born in Baragoi, Lopaga spent his early years in Maralal, later living as a "street kid", moving between Nyahururu, Nakuru and Nairobi. He joined a homeless rehabilitation programme and began playing football.

== Club career ==
Lopaga began playing for Shy Football Academy, before signing for Gor Mahia in 2017. He moved to Mt Kenya United in 2019, later signing for Posta Rangers.

After a spell with A.F.C. Leopards, he signed for Omani club Dhofar in February 2023.

He signed for Belarusian club Dynamo Brest in August 2023, scoring his first goal for the club in his second match. He later said he wanted to score more goals for the club. He also said that his new teammate Cédric Kouadio was helping him settling in.

In July 2024, he moved on loan to Naftan Novopolotsk. He was released by Dynamo Brest in December 2024.

== International career ==
Lopaga has played for the Kenya under-17 and under-23 teams.

In June 2024, he was called up to the Kenya senior team for the first team.
