= Castle Lager Cup =

- Organiser(s): Tanzania Football Association
- Founded: 2000
- Abolished: 2003
- Region: East Africa
- Teams: 4
- Last champions: Kenya (1st title)
- Most championships: Uganda Tanzania; Kenya (1 title each)

The Castle Lager Cup (East Africa) was a football tournament that featured national teams from Kenya, Uganda, and Tanzania, along with a guest team in each of the three editions played between 2000-2002.

== History ==
The four-nation tournament was aimed at promoting East African football and was organized by the Tanzania Football Association. South African Breweries (SAB) sponsored the first three editions and did not renew it thereafter.

The inaugural tournament was held in Nairobi in 2000, with Uganda emerging as the winners. Tanzania won the 2001 edition as hosts. Kenya, the runners-up in both 2000 and 2001, won the third edition held in Tanzania once again in 2002 after seeing off Uganda 3-2 on post match penalties after a 1-1 draw.
