= Somalia national under-23 football team =

National youth association football team

Somalia U23
- Nickname: The Star of the Ocean
- Association: Somali Football Federation (SFF)
- Confederation: CAF (Africa)
- Head coach: Mababazi
- Captain: Unknown
- Most caps: Unknown
- Top scorer: Abdullahi Omar Egal (39)
- Home stadium: Mogadishu Stadium
First colours	Second colours

The Somalia national u23 football team nicknamed The star of the oceans (Arabic: نجوم المحيط), represents Somalia in men's international u23 football. It is controlled by the Somali Football Federation (SFF), and is a member of the Confederation of African Football (CAF) and the Union of Arab Football Associations (UAFA).

== History ==
The Somali Youth League (SYL), the nation's first political party, had put together a team of local youth to play against the Italian expatriate teams. This was seen as the first Somali youth team. To this day, most Somalis see the Somali Youth League (SYL) as the main source of Somali youth footballers. Somalia's national u23 football team is relatively new and they have only played 1 match (against Rwanda u23 for u23 CAF 2017) in which the coach, Mbabazi stated the team was "too weak for Rwanda U23."

== Current squad ==
No.	Pos.	Player	Date of birth (age)	Caps	Club
		Hassan Abdinur Gesey	{{>23}}		
		Abdinasir Yusuf	{{>23}}		
		Hamsa Mohamed Mukhtar	{{>23}}		
		Bile Muhudin Burale	{{>23}}		
		Mohamed Salah Hussein	{{>23}}		
		Salahudiin Mohamed Nuh	{{>23}}		
		Ahmed Mohamed Hussein	{{>23}}		
		Mustaf Khalib Hussein	{{>23}}		
		Abas Amin Mohamed	{{>23}}		
		Hassan Hussein Mohamed	{{>23}}		
		Hassan Ibrahim Ali	{{>23}}		
		Mahad Muhudin Haji	{{>23}}		
		Hassan Farid Hassan	{{>23}}		
		Mohamed Ali Ibrahim	{{>23}}		
		Osman Yusuf Hajow	{{>23}}		
		Abukar Abdikarim Nur	{{>23}}		
		Ali Hassan Babay	{{>23}}		
		Abdifatah Abdi Osman	{{>23}}		
		Abdulahi Nur Ali	{{>23}}		
		Abdulahi Abdirahman Jama	{{>23}}		

== Managerial history ==
- (Qatar) Yousef Adam (2010)
