= Benjamín Ndong =

Equatoguinean footballer (born 1999)

Benjamín Edú
Personal information
- Full name: Benjamín Edu Ndong Ndoho
- Date of birth: 13 March 1999 (age 27)
- Place of birth: Ebibeyin, Equatorial Guinea
- Height: 1.67 m (5 ft 6 in)
- Position: Forward

Team information
- Current team: La Fuente
- Number: 17

Youth career
- Cano Sport
- 2017–2018: Rio Ave

Senior career*
Years	Team	Apps	(Gls)
2018	Rio Ave B	1	(0)
2018–2021	Cano Sport		
2021–	La Fuente	30	(6)

International career^{‡}
2018	Equatorial Guinea U23	1	(1)
2017–	Equatorial Guinea	4	(0)
- * Club domestic league appearances and goals as of 9 April 2022 ‡ National team caps and goals as of 20 October 2019

Benjamín Edu Ndong Ndoho (born 13 March 1999), or simply Benjamín, is an Equatoguinean footballer who plays as a forward for Spanish Primera Autonómica Preferente de Castilla-La Mancha club UD La Fuente and for the Equatorial Guinea national team.

== Club career ==
Born in Ebibeyin, Benjamín has played for Rio Ave FC in Portugal. He is a product of Cano Sport Academy.

== International career ==
Benjamín made his international debut for Equatorial Guinea in 2017.
