= Lennox Ogutu =

Kenyan footballer (born 1997)

Personal information
- Full name: Lennox Ogutu
- Date of birth: 23 April 1997 (age 29)
- Height: 1.80 m (5 ft 11 in)
- Position: Defender

Youth career
- 2013-2015: Young Rovers

Senior career*
Years	Team	Apps	(Gls)
2016-2021	Mathare United	38	(2)
2021-	Nairobi City Stars	15	(2)
- * Club domestic league appearances and goals

Lennox Capello Ogutu is a Kenyan defender who features for Kenyan Premier League side Nairobi City Stars. He formerly turned out for Mathare United.

== Career ==
Ogutu arrived at Mathare United straight out of high school in 2016. That year, Lennox was part of the clubs' junior side that won two straight KPL U20 Championships after wins in August and December tournaments.

He graduated to the senior team in 2017 and went on to feature in 32 of 34 in his maiden Kenyan Premier League season. He stayed on at the club for the 2017, 2018, 2018/19, 2019/20 and 2020/21 seasons before crossing over to Nairobi City Stars. His debut goal for City Stars was against his former side Mathare United.

While at Mathare, Ogutu was called up to the Kenya National U23 team for ties against Mauritius in the first round 2019 Africa U-23 Cup of Nations qualification. He was an unused substitute in home and away games played.

== Honours ==
=== Club ===
Mathare United

- KPL U20 Championship: (Aug 2016)
- KPL U20 Championship: (Dec 2016)
