= Edwin Buliba =

Kenyan footballer (born 2000)

Edwin Buliba Angaba
Personal information
- Full name: Edwin Buliba Angaba
- Date of birth: 28 December 2000 (age 25)
- Height: 1.77 m (5 ft 10 in)
- Position: Defender

Youth career
- 2016: Vapor Sports

Senior career*
| Years | Team | Apps | (Gls) |
| 2017 | Vapor Sports | | |
| 2019–20 | Nairobi City Stars | 5 | (0) |
| 2020–22 | Nairobi City Stars | 38 | (0) |
- * Club domestic league appearances and goals as of 12 May 2023

Edwin Buliba Angaba is a Kenyan defender who plays for Kenyan Premier League side Nairobi City Stars.

== Career ==
Buliba, a Kakamega High and Kamukunji High School alumnus, formerly played for Kawangware-based Vapor Sports before joining Nairobi City Stars in 2017. He is one of the players who remained with the club upon promotion to the Premier League at the end of the 2019–20 National Super League.

Buliba was handed his Kenyan Premier League debut by head coach Sanjin Alagic in the second game of the 2020/21 season against KCB on 4 December 2020 in Kasarani when he came on as a second-half substitute. He went on to earn a total of eight games as a substitute in his first topflight season.

He earned his first Premier League start under coach Nicholas Muyoti against Nzoia Sugar in Ruaraka on 8 December 2021 and went on to register a total of eight starts in the 2021–22 season.

He stayed on for the 2022–23 season, and despite a tough season, believes the team will finish the league on a high.

== Honours ==
Nairobi City Stars

- National Super League: 2019–20
