= Mulukbu =

Town and railroad station in Western Region, Kenya

Mulukbu (Kenya)

Mulukbu, also known as Sudi, is a town and railroad station in the Western Region of Kenya.
