= Levis Okello =

Kenyan footballer

Levis Barasa Okello
Personal information
- Full name: Levis Barasa Okello
- Date of birth: 31 December 1994 (age 31)
- Height: 1.74 m (5 ft 9 in)
- Position: Striker

Senior career*
| Years | Team | Apps | (Gls) |
| 2018 | Samia All Stars | | |
| 2018 | Chemelil Sugar F.C. | 2 | (0) |
| 2019-2021 | Vihiga Bullets | | |
| 2021 | Nzoia Sugar F.C. | 18 | (9) |
| 2022 | Kakamega Homeboyz F.C. | 7 | (0) |
| 2023 | → Nairobi City Stars (loan) | 5 | (2) |
- * Club domestic league appearances and goals as of 16 May 2023

Levis Barasa Okello is a Kenyan striker currently in the ranks of Kenyan Premier League side Nairobi City Stars.

== Career ==
Okello previously featured for Samia AllStars before joining Kenyan Premier League side Chemelil Sugar F.C. in November 2018.

He later left for lower-tier side Vihiga Bullets, then arrived at Nzoia Sugar F.C. ahead of the 2021/22 Kenyan topflight season.

In Aug 2022, Okello made a switch to Kakamega Homeboyz F.C. Okello later joined Nairobi City Stars, on loan, in the March 2023 transfer window for the rest of the season.

He earned his debut on 5 April 2023 as a second-half substitute against KCB in Kasarani Annex. He scored his maiden City Stars goal against Ulinzi Stars at the Ulinzi Complex on 7 May 2023.
