= John Ochieng =

Kenyan footballer (born 2003)

John Ochieng is a Kenyan midfielder currently in the ranks of Zambian Premier League side Zanaco F.C. and the Kenya national football team.

== Career ==
Ochieng formerly turned out for Chemelil Sugar, and Gor Mahia before heading to Zambia's Zanaco F.C.
