= Peter Opiyo =

Kenyan footballer (born 1992)

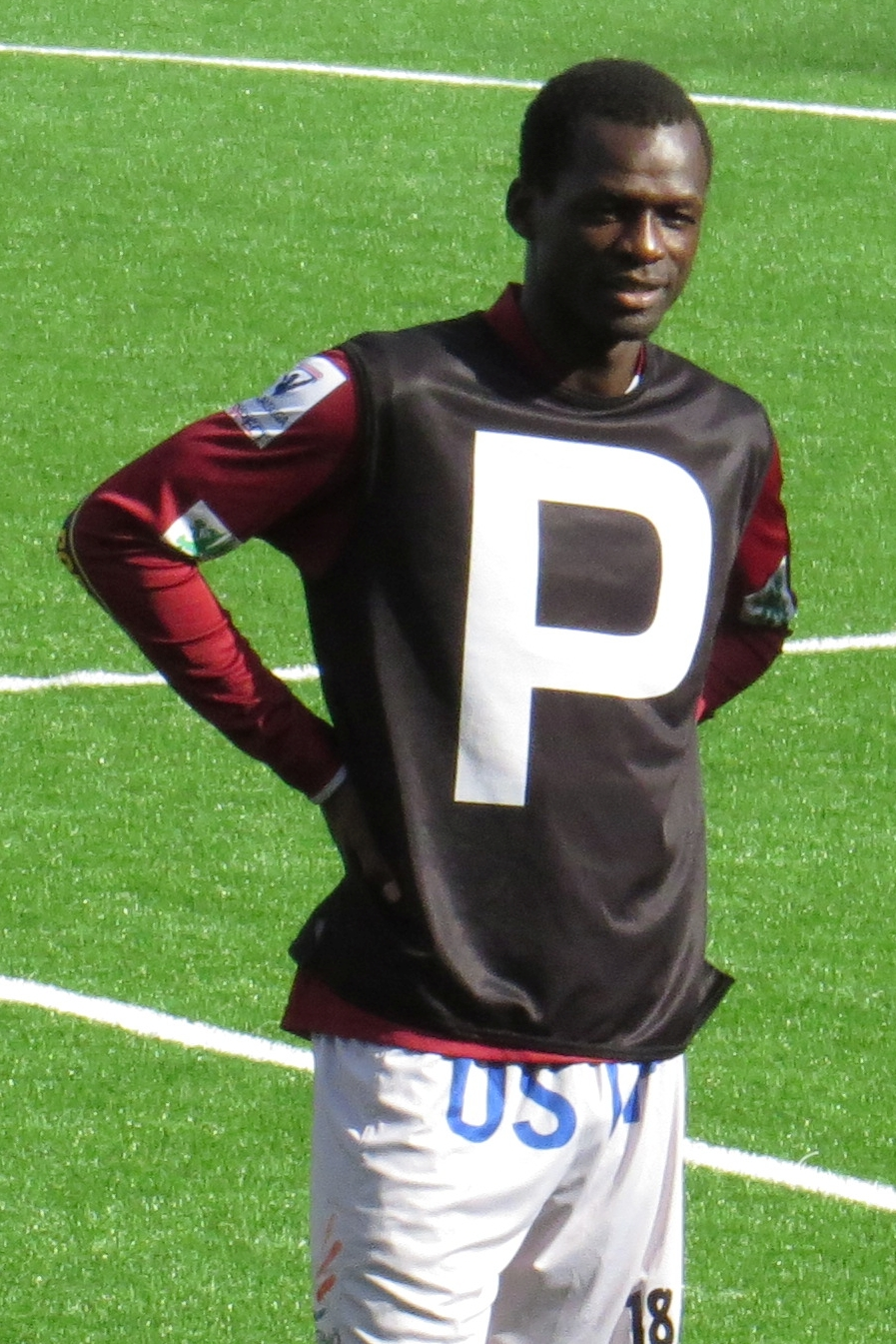
- Opiyo with FF Jaro in 2015

Personal information
- Full name: Peter Opiyo Odhiambo
- Date of birth: 1 August 1992 (age 34)
- Place of birth: Bondo, Kenya
- Height: 1.73 m (5 ft 8 in)
- Position: Midfielder

Team information
- Current team: Nairobi City Stars
- Number: 10

Youth career
- 2004–2006: Tusker

Senior career*
Years	Team	Apps	(Gls)
2006–2011	Thika United	40	(2)
2009–2010	→ Gor Mahia (loan)	20	(2)
2012–2013	Tusker	29	(1)
2013	A.F.C. Leopards	15	(2)
2014–2016	FF Jaro	51	(0)
2014	→ Jakobstads BK (loan)	1	(0)
2016–2017	Al-Markhiya		
2018	SJK	13	(0)
2019	Altyn Asyr	0	(0)
2020–	Nairobi City Stars	58	(13)

International career
2009–2014	Kenya	29	(0)
- * Club domestic league appearances and goals as of 22 June 2023

Peter Pinchez Opiyo Odhiambo, is a Kenyan midfielder, currently in the ranks of Kenyan Premier League side Nairobi City Stars. He previously played for other Kenyan topflight clubs including Tusker, A.F.C. Leopards, Thika United with loan spells at Gor Mahia. He also turned out for Finnish Veikkausliiga sides FF Jaro and SJK.

== Club career ==
Opiyo began his youth career with Tusker and signed for Thika United in January 2008. After only one year with Thika United, he moved to Gor Mahia in February 2009 on loan, and his loan spell with Gor Mahia was set to continue until 2010.

In 2011, he returned to Thika United for the remainder of the year, before rejoining Tusker for the 2012 season helping the side to clinch their ninth league title. He moved to A.F.C. Leopards in 2013, helping the side to a second-place finish in the league and a ninth domestic cup. He scored the lone and winning goal against arch-rivals Gor Mahia.

On 11 March 2014, Opiyo completed a move to Finnish top-tier side FF Jaro in a two-year deal. He made his debut for the club in their fourth-round 2014 Finnish Cup match against FC Hämeenlinna on 15 March, but could not help prevent the club from a 2–1 loss and an early exit from the tournament.

After flirting with AFC Leopards in the June transfer window, Kenyan international midfielder Opiyo sealed a move to Qatar second division side Al-Markhiya SC on 25 July 2016, a team he led to promotion at the end of the season. On 26 July 2018, Opiyo signed for SJK. He left the club again at the end of 2018.

In August 2019, Peter Opiyo and Nigerian Uche Kalu signed a contract with FC Altyn Asyr from Turkmenistan. They were the first foreign footballers in the history of the club and the first legionnaire in the 2019 Ýokary Liga. Despite having a contract, paperwork complications saw him fail to join the team and in mid-November 2019 he issued a termination notice and consequently ended his engagement with the club in early December to become a free agent.

After weeks of training with promotion-chasing Nairobi City Stars, Opiyo joined the second-tier side in January 2020 on a one-and-a-half-year deal. He went on to renew his stay with the club with separate one-year deals to feature in the 2021–22, and 2022-23 FKF Premier League seasons.

== International career ==
He featured for the Kenya national team between 2009 and 2014. He was first capped on 14 Mar 2009 by German coach Antoine Hey as Kenya took on Iran at the Azadi Stadium in an international friendly. It ended 1–0 to the hosts. He was also part of the squad that won the 2013 CECAFA Cup on home soil.

== Coaching journey ==
In January 2023 Opiyo started his coaching journey by acquiring a CAF 'D' Diploma license, and in March of the same year, he moved to the Nairobi City Stars technical bench to kick start his apprenticeship with an assistant coaching role following a long-term injury.

== Career statistics ==
=== International ===
Appearances and goals by national team and year
National team	Year	Apps	Goals
Kenya	2009	9	0
Kenya	2010	1	0
Kenya	2011	–	
Kenya	2012	2	0
Kenya	2013	14	0
Kenya	2014	3	0
Total		29	0

== Honors ==
=== Club ===
Gor Mahia FC

(gold) Champions (1): FKL Cup: 2011

Tusker FC

(gold) Champions (1): 2012 Kenyan Premier League

AFC Leopards

(gold) Champions (1): 2013 FKF President's Cup

Nairobi City Stars

(gold) Champions (1): 2019-20 National Super League

=== Kenya ===
(gold) Champions (1): 2013 CECAFA Cup

=== Individual ===
- 2009 Kenyan Premier League: Midfielder of the year (Gor Mahia FC)
- 2009 Kenyan Premier League: Runner-up Young player & runner-up Player of the year (Gor Mahia FC)
