= Ezekiel Odera =

Kenyan footballer (born 1988)

Ezekiel Omulo Odera
Personal information
- Full name: Ezekiel Odera
- Date of birth: 9 March 1988 (age 38)
- Place of birth: Nairobi, Kenya
- Height: 1.75 m (5 ft 9 in)
- Position: Striker

Team information
- Current team: Nairobi City Stars
- Number: 32

Youth career
- 2007-2009: Sports Connect

Senior career*
Years	Team	Apps	(Gls)
2010	KCB	27	(11)
2011	Gor Mahia	11	(1)
2012	KCB	15	(3)
2013	Thika United F.C.	26	(5)
2014	Ushuru	8	(1)
2014	KCB	6	(0)
2015	Thika United F.C.	4	(0)
2015	Sofapaka F.C.	7	(1)
2016	Nairobi City Stars	24	(4)
2017	Nairobi City Stars	26	(11)
2018	A.F.C. Leopards	26	(10)
2018-19	→ KCB (loan)	23	(5)
2019-20	Nairobi City Stars	6	(3)
2020-	Nairobi City Stars	78	(18)
- * Club domestic league appearances and goals as of 16 May 2023

Ezekiel Odera (born 9 March 1988) is a Kenyan footballer who currently plays as a striker for Kenyan Premier League side Nairobi City Stars.

== Career ==
Odera signed his first professional contract after joining Kenyan Premier League side KCB in 2010 from Buruburu-based Sports Connect Academy.

He went on to top score for the club with 11 goals and that performance ultimately earned him the 2009 New Player of the year and runners-up top scorer awards.

In 2011 he moved to Gor Mahia for a season before returning to KCB once again in 2012, and on two other occasions including on loan.

He went on to feature for four other top-tier sides including Thika United F.C., Ushuru, Sofapaka F.C., Nairobi City Stars and A.F.C. Leopards where he was named the March 2018 player of the Month.

He was part of Nairobi City Stars during their first season in the second tier in 2017, then in their promotion year in the 2019–20 season after rejoining in Jan 2020.

At the expiry of his initial two-and-a-half-year contract, he extended it in August 2022 to stay on at the club till the end of the 2022-23 Kenyan Premier League season.

== Playing style ==
Odera's greatest assets are build-up, controlling skills, one v one against defenders, prowess in aerial duels, and penalty-kicking skills.
