= Rodgers Okumu =

Kenyan footballer

Rodgers Okumu Okoth
Personal information
- Full name: Rodgers Okumu Okoth
- Date of birth: 10 June 1994 (age 32)
- Place of birth: Mombasa
- Height: 1.68 m (5 ft 6 in)
- Position: Winger

Youth career
- 2000-2012: Ziwani FC

Senior career*
Years	Team	Apps	(Gls)
2012-2014	Mombasa United		
2015-2020	Coast Stima F.C.		
2020-	Nairobi City Stars	42	(4)
- * Club domestic league appearances and goals as of 19:31, 20 May 2022 (UTC)

Rodgers Okuse Okumu (born June 6, 1994) is a Kenyan football winger currently in the ranks of Kenyan Premier League side Nairobi City Stars.

== Club career ==
In October 2020 he was signed up by Nairobi City Stars after promotion to the Kenyan Premier League.

He made his top-flight bow on 4 Dec 2020 in Kasarani after coming on as a 59th-minute substitute against KCB. His maiden Premier League goal arrived on 2 March 2021 at the same Kasarani during a 2–0 win over Mathare United.
