= Derrick Otanga =

Kenyan footballer

Personal information
- Full name: Derrick Otanga
- Date of birth: 22 October 1996 (age 30)
- Height: 1.76 m (5 ft 9 in)
- Position: Striker

Senior career*
Years	Team	Apps	(Gls)
2017–19	SoNy Sugar F.C.	40	(15)
2019–20	Wazito F.C.	21	(8)
2020–22	KCB FC	59	(28)
2022–	Alittihad Misurata SC	0	(0)
- * Club domestic league appearances and goals

Derrick Otanga is a Kenyan football striker currently in the ranks of Libyan Premier League side Alittihad Misurata SC.

Otanga formerly turned out for Kenyan Premier League sides SoNy Sugar F.C. Wazito F.C. and his immediate former club KCB FC before heading to Libya.
