= Marvin Omondi =

Kenyan footballer

Personal information
- Full name: Marvin Nabwire Omondi
- Date of birth: 3 December 2000 (age 25)
- Place of birth: Kakamega, Kenya
- Height: 1.81 m (5 ft 11 in)
- Position: Midfielder

Team information
- Current team: A.F.C. Leopards

Senior career*
Years	Team	Apps	(Gls)
2018–	A.F.C. Leopards		

International career^{‡}
2018	Kenya	1	(0)
- * Club domestic league appearances and goals as of 11:25, 12 March 2023 (UTC) ‡ National team caps and goals as of 11:25, 12 March 2023 (UTC)

Marvin Nabwire Omondi (born 3 December 2000) is a Kenyan footballer who plays for A.F.C. Leopards as a midfielder.

== Career ==
Born in Kakamega, Omondi has played club football for A.F.C. Leopards.

He made his international debut for Kenyan national team in 2018.
