= Francis Kahiro =

Kenyan footballer

Francis Kahiro is a Kenyan striker currently in the ranks of Kenyan Premier League side KCB FC.

Kahiro formerly turned out for FC Talanta and Bandari F.C. (Kenya) whom he left after half a season to return to KCB FC.
