= Augustine Kuta =

Kenyan footballer (born 2000)

Personal information
- Full name: Augustine Kuta Mtiang'a
- Date of birth: 3 May 2000 (age 26)
- Height: 1.74 m (5 ft 9 in)
- Position: Midfielder

Senior career*
| Years | Team | Apps | (Gls) |
| 2013-2015 | Vihiga AllStars | | |
| 2017 | Palos FC | | |
| 2018–2019 | Nairobi Stima | | |
| 2019–2020 | Western Stima F.C. | | |
| 2022 | Kibera Black Stars | | |
| 2022 | Nairobi City Stars | 10 | (0) |
- * Club domestic league appearances and goals

Augustine Kuta Mtiang'a (born 3 May 2000), is a Kenyan offensive midfielder who currently features for Kenyan Premier League side Nairobi City Stars. He formerly turned out for lower tier sides Vihiga AllStars, Palos FC, Nairobi Stima, Kibera Black Stars and Kenyan Premier League side Western Stima F.C.
