= Ruaraka =

Industrial and residential suburb of Kasarani in Nairobi

- Location of Ruaraka in Kenya
- Coordinates: 01°14′45″S 36°52′39″E
- Country: Kenya
- County: Nairobi City
- Sub-county: Kasarani

Ruaraka is an industrial and residential suburb in the city of Nairobi. Located within the larger sub-county of Kasarani, it is approximately 8 kilometres (5.0 mi) northeast of Nairobi's central business district off Thika Road.

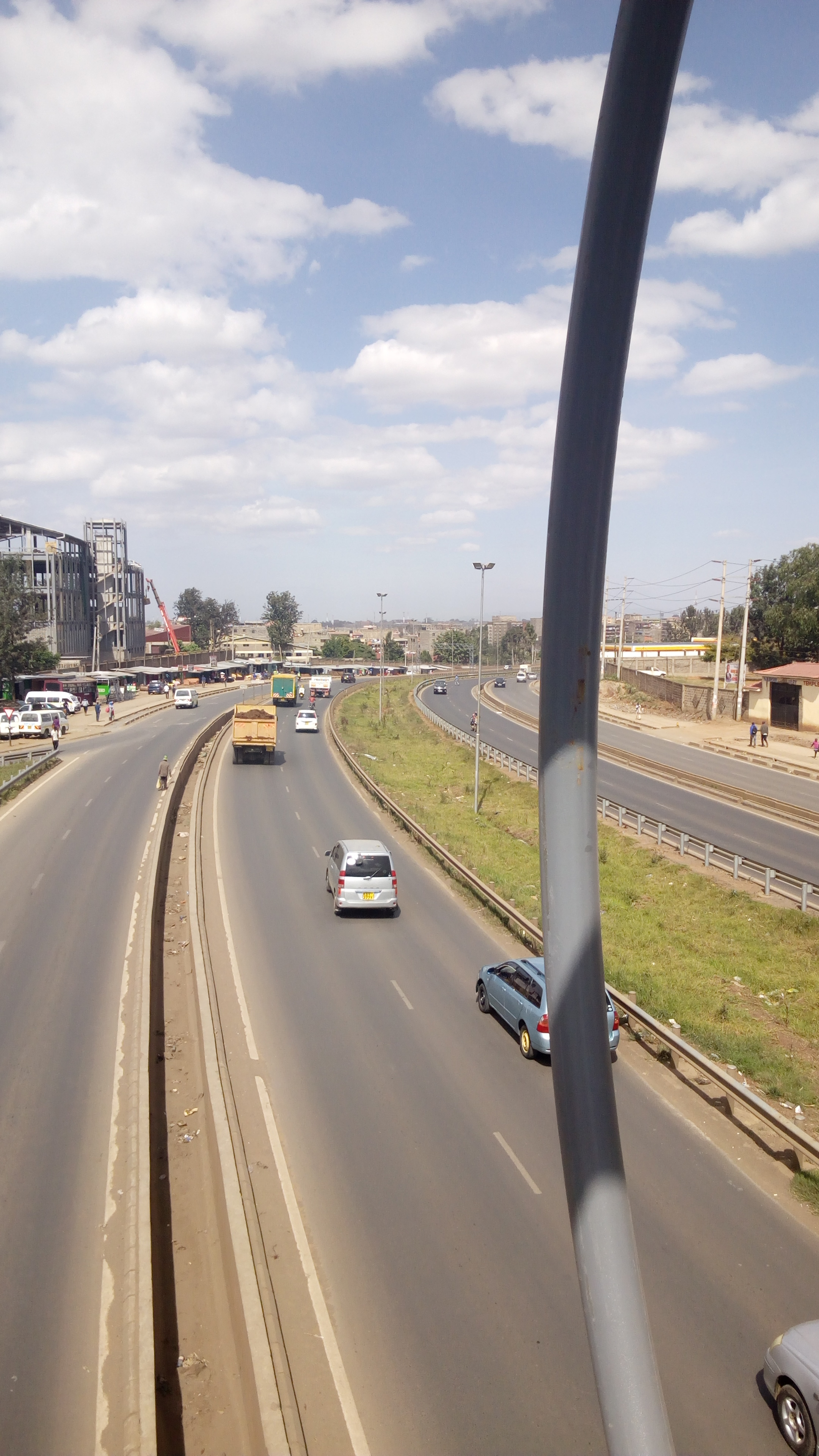
Outer Ring Road at the Ruaraka-Allsops area

== Location ==
Ruaraka is located approximately 8 kilometres (5 mi) northeast of Nairobi's central business district, within the sub-county of Kasarani. It is straddled by the Outer Ring, Baba Dogo and the Thika roads.

== Overview ==
Ruaraka came to being in 1922 when two Welsh brothers Charles and George Hurst, and a friend H. A. Dowding, gained interest in an inhabited area along a river known as Rui-Rwa-Aka, that reserved for the Kikuyu girls during circumcision. Along the banks of the river, the brothers picked an expansive land to set up the very first brewery in British Kenya known as Kenya Breweries. The brewery fate later became uncertain when one of the proprietors was George Hurst was killed by an elephant. To honour his memory, his brother named the new beer Tusker.

In 1938, Taylor and Company, owned by entrepreneur William Taylor, was established in the area. Later in 1951, Ind Coope and Allsopp (East Africa) Limited bought a controlling interest that brought forth the launching the Pilsner and Allsopps beer brands in the Kenyan market. Kenya Breweries would later buy Allsopps and Pilsner to form the East African Breweries Limited (EABL).

In 1960, a Danish businessman, Baron U. Akerhielm, established another factory to supply EABL with brewery tanks.

Over the years Ruaraka area has seen significant growth in establishment of other industrial plants, making it a major industrial hub in Nairobi.

Allsops, Baba Dogo and the Tusker Village, neighbourhoods form part of the Ruaraka.

== Points of interest ==
1. East African Breweries Limited (EABL), in Ruaraka.
2. Pepsi Cola (EA) Limited, in Ruaraka.
3. General Service Unit (GSU) headquarters, along Thika Road.
