= Erick Ombija =

Kenyan footballer (born 1994)

Erick Ombija Ngoja
Personal information
- Full name: Erick Ombija Ngoja
- Date of birth: 7 June 1994 (age 32)
- Height: 1.75 m (5 ft 9 in)
- Position: Striker

Team information
- Current team: Nairobi City Stars
- Number: 24

Senior career*
Years	Team	Apps	(Gls)
2016-18	Gor Mahia Youth		
2018	Coast Stima FC		
2018-19	Gor Mahia	6	(2)
2019-20	→ Coast Stima (loan)	25	(17)
2020-22	Nairobi City Stars	41	(5)
- * Club domestic league appearances and goals as of 19:31, 17 May 2023 (UTC)

Erick Ombija Ngoja (born 7 June 1994) is a Kenyan striker who formerly turned out for Kenyan Premier League sides Gor Mahia F.C. and Nairobi City Stars.

== Club career ==
Ombija turned out for Gor Mahia Youth before heading out to second-tier and coast-based side Coast Stima.

After a season he was back at Gor Mahia, the senior side, for the 2018–19 season but was to return to Coast Stima on loan for the season, from where he went on to top scorer in the league with 17 goals in 25 games.

He then joined Nairobi City Stars for the 2020-21 FKF Premier League season on a two-year deal.

He scored his maiden goal for the club on Sat 20 Feb 2021 against Zoo FC in Kasarani Annex and went on to score two more against Western Stima in awa and home games. He scored another two the next season against Bidco United and Kakamega Homeboyz.

He left City Stars at the end of his term.
