= Charles Otieno =

Kenyan footballer

Charles Otieno Oduro
Personal information
- Full name: Charles Otieno Oduro
- Date of birth: 1 September 1992 (age 34)
- Height: 1.77 m (5 ft 10 in)
- Position: Midfielder

Youth career
- 2016: Vapor Sports

Senior career*
Years	Team	Apps	(Gls)
2017	Nairobi City Stars	23	(0)
2020-22	Nairobi City Stars	20	(0)
- * Club domestic league appearances and goals

Charles Otieno Oduro is a Kenyan midfielder currently in the ranks of Kenyan Premier League side Nairobi City Stars.

== Career ==
Oduro joined the side in 2017 after relegation from the top flight and was part of the side that gained promotion to the top flight after the 2019/20 second-tier season. He renewed his contract for a further two years after the promotion till the end of the 2021/22 season.

He was handed his premier league debut in January 2021 by head coach Sanjin Alagic as City Stars visited Sofapaka F.C. in Wundanyi for a matchday 9 tie.

== Honours ==
=== Club ===
Nairobi City Stars

- National Super League

(gold) Champions (1): 2019-20
