= Ronney Kola =

Kenyan footballer (born 2000)

Ronney Kola Oyaro
Personal information
- Full name: Ronney Kola Oyaro
- Date of birth: 26 June 2000 (age 26)
- Height: 1.80 m (5 ft 11 in)
- Position: Midfielder

Youth career
- 2016: Kenya School of Government

Senior career*
Years	Team	Apps	(Gls)
2018-2020	Kenya School of Government		
2020–	Nairobi City Stars	0	(0)
2020-2021	→ Nairobi Stima (loan)	17	(3)
2022–24	Nairobi City Stars	17	(0)
2024	Naivas FC	1	(0)
- * Club domestic league appearances and goals as of 25 Jan 2024

Ronney Kola Oyaro is a Kenyan midfielder who until recently turned out for Kenyan Premier League side Nairobi City Stars. He is now at Kenyan second-tier side Naivas FC.

== Career ==
Kola formerly turned out for lower-tier side Kenya School of Government's Ogopa FC before joining Nairobi City Stars in the year 2020 on a long-term deal.

He was sent on loan to second-tier side Nairobi Stima F.C. for the 2020-21 National Super League season to gain work experience. He did not finish the season after a knee injury kept him out of the game for the entire 2021–2022 season. He, however, recovered after a series of rehab ahead of the 2022–23 season.

He made his Kenyan Premier League debut in the first game of the 2022-23 FKF Premier League season against Bidco United in Nyayo Stadium on 19 Nov 2022. He went on to register 16 games on his debut Kenyan topflight season.

He featured in one more game for City Stars in the 2023-24 FKF Premier League before leaving the club after 3 1/2 seasons during the mid transfer window to join second-tier side Naivas FC.
