= Jacob Osano =

Kenyan footballer (born 1994)

Jacob Osano Ogada
Personal information
- Full name: Jacob Osano Ogada
- Date of birth: 31 December 1994 (age 31)
- Height: 1.88 m (6 ft 2 in)
- Position: Goalkeeper

Team information
- Current team: Sofapaka F.C.
- Number: 1

Senior career*
Years	Team	Apps	(Gls)
2012-2014	Wazito FC		
2015-2016	Nairobi Stima		
2016-2018	KCB		
2019	Nairobi Stima		
2019-20	Nairobi City Stars	1	(0)
2020-2023	Nairobi City Stars	46	(0)
2023-	Sofapaka F.C.	10	(0)
- * Club domestic league appearances and goals as of 19:31, 5 Dec 2023 (UTC)

Jacob Osano Ogada is a Kenyan goalkeeper currently in the ranks of Kenyan Premier League side Sofapaka F.C. He is a sibling to former Kenya international Zachary Onyango.

== Club career ==
Osano joined KCB in 2017 to the end of the 2018 season. In 2019 he rejoined Nairobi Stima then moved to Nairobi City Stars at the start of the year 2020 on a two-and-a-half-year contract.

He made his premier league debut against Kenya Police on 16 Oct 2021 in Kasarani, and has so far tended goal in 26 of 30 games in the 2021/22 topflight season.

Osano extended his contract for one more season to feature in the 2022/23 FKF Premier League.

Prior to the season kickoff, Osano had been scouted by Ethiopian topflight side Ethiopia Coffee but the deal failed to materialize and he was back at City Stars.

At the end of the 2022–23 Kenyan Premier League, Osano left City Stars to join another Kenyan topflight side Sofapaka F.C.

== Honors ==
=== Club ===
KCB

- National Super League champion: 2018

Nairobi City Stars

- National Super League champion: 2019/20
