= Kevin Otieno =

Kenyan footballer (born 1998)

Kevin Okumu Otieno
Personal information
- Full name: Kevin Okumu Otieno
- Date of birth: 24 April 1998 (age 28)
- Height: 1.78 m (5 ft 10 in)
- Position: Defender

Team information
- Current team: KCB

Youth career
- 2014-2016: FC Kariobangi Sharks

Senior career*
Years	Team	Apps	(Gls)
2016	Young Rovers		
2016-2020	Nairobi City Stars		
2020-2021	Wazito F.C.	1	(0)
2021-2022	Nairobi City Stars	41	(2)
2022-	KCB	0	(0)
- * Club domestic league appearances and goals

Kevin Chumsy Okumu Otieno, born in Jericho, Nairobi County, is a Kenyan defender, currently in the ranks of Kenyan Premier League side KCB. The right-back cum right-winger formerly turned out for FC Kariobangi Sharks, Young Rovers, Wazito F.C. and Nairobi City Stars. He earned his first National Team (Harambee Stars) call up after being selected by Ben McCauthy for CHAN 2025.

== Career ==
Kevin was in the junior ranks of FC Kariobangi Sharks until 2016 before joining local side Young Rovers FC. He arrived at Nairobi City Stars in mid-2016, and went on to complete the 2017, 2018, 2018/19, and 2019/20 seasons.

He moved to Wazito F.C. in July 2020 and made his premier league debut in a 2020-21 FKF Premier League season opener against FC Kariobangi Sharks in Kasarani.

He returned to Nairobi City Stars in February 2021 on loan for the second part of the season before making the move permanent at the end of the season. He moved to KCB at the end of the 2021–22 FKF Premier League season.

== Honours ==
=== Club ===
Nairobi City Stars

- National Super League

(gold) Champions (1): 2019-20
