= Herit Mungai =

Kenyan footballer (born 2000)

Herit Mungai Atariza
Personal information
- Full name: Herit Mungai Atariza
- Date of birth: 14 March 2000 (age 26)
- Place of birth: Kawangware, Kenya
- Height: 1.73 m (5 ft 8 in)
- Position: Defender

Team information
- Current team: Nairobi City Stars
- Number: 28

Senior career*
Years	Team	Apps	(Gls)
2017	FC Talanta		
2018	F.C. Kariobangi Sharks	1	(0)
2018/19	Posta Rangers F.C.	10	(0)
2019	Coast Stars F.C.		
2020-	Nairobi City Stars	48	(0)
- * Club domestic league appearances and goals as of 19:31, 12 May 2022 (UTC)

Herit Mungai Atariza is a left-back currently in the books of Kenyan Premier League side Nairobi City Stars.

== Career ==
Mungai turned out for second-tier side FC Talanta in 2017 for a year before making a big move to Kenyan Premier League side F.C. Kariobangi Sharks at the start of the 2018 season.

He then moved to Posta Rangers F.C. in 2019 for a short stint. He was to return to the second tier to join Coast Stars F.C. In 2020 he returned to the topflight by joining Nairobi City Stars.
