= Cliff Nyakeya =

Kenyan footballer (born 1995)

Personal information
- Date of birth: 11 January 1995 (age 31)
- Place of birth: Nyeri, Kenya
- Positions: Midfielder; winger; forward

Youth career
- Gor Mahia
2016-2019	Mathare United F.C.		
2019-	FC Masr	6	(0)
2019-2022	Wazito FC		
2022-2024	AFC Leopards		
2024-	Shabana		

International career
Years	Team	Apps	(Gls)
2019-	Kenya	3	(1)

Cliff Nyakeya is a Kenyan professional footballer who plays as an attacking midfielder and forward for Shabana FC in the Kenyan Premier League and the Kenya national football team.

== Career ==
Nyakeya started his career with Gor Mahia. After that, he played for Mathare United. In 2019, he signed for Masr in the Egyptian Premier League, where he has made six league appearances and scored zero goals.
