= Dennis Wanjala =

Kenyan footballer

Dennis Wanjala Khayiya
Personal information
- Full name: Dennis Wanjala Khayiya
- Date of birth: 10 August 1998 (age 28)
- Place of birth: Bungoma, Kenya
- Height: 1.73 m (5 ft 8 in)
- Position: Defender

Team information
- Current team: Tusker FC
- Number: 17

Senior career*
Years	Team	Apps	(Gls)
2018–2021	Nzoia Sugar FC	63	(2)
2021–2024	Nairobi City Stars	72	(3)
2024–	Tusker FC	24	(1)
- * Club domestic league appearances and goals as of 19:31, 17 Jul 2024 (UTC)

Dennis Decha Wanjala (born 10 August 1998) is a left footed fullback/ wingback currently in the ranks of Kenyan Premier League side Tusker FC.

== Career ==
Wanjala previously played for Nzoia Sugar F.C. whom he joined at the onset of the 2018 season straight out of high school.

He earned his Kenyan Premier League debut for the side in an away game against Mathare United at the Kenyatta Stadium, Machakos on Sun 11 Feb 2018.

After four seasons at Nzoia Sugar F.C. Wanjala joined City Stars on a three-year deal. He made made his City Stars debut in an away game to Sofapaka in Wundanyi on 25 Sept 2021 during the opening game of the 2021–22 FKF Premier League season.

He scored his maiden goal for the club on 16 April 2023 during a 5–2 rout of Vihiga Bullets in Kasarani Annex. In the next game against Kariobangi Sharks at the same venue on 22 Apr 2023, he registered a milestone: a century of games in the Kenyan topflight.

After three seasons at City Stars, Wanjala joined 13-time Kenyan league champions Tusker FC on a two-year deal.

After three seasons at City Stars, Wanjala joined 13-time Kenyan league champions Tusker FC on a two-year deal.
