= Kenedy Onyango =

Kenyan footballer (born 1988)

Kennedy Onyango Ouma
Personal information
- Full name: Kennedy Onyango Ouma
- Date of birth: 24 October 1988 (age 38)
- Height: 1.77 m (5 ft 10 in)
- Position: Defender

Youth career
- 2011: Sony Sugar

Senior career*
Years	Team	Apps	(Gls)
2011-2012	Shabana F.C.	-	(0)
2013	Karuturi Sports	6	(0)
2013	F.C. Talanta	-	(0)
2014	Nairobi Stima F.C.	-	(0)
2015-2017	Nakumatt FC	29	(1)
2018	Posta Rangers FC	18	(0)
2018-2020	Kakamega Homeboyz F.C.	33	(8)
2020-23	Nairobi City Stars	88	(1)
2020-25	Gor Mahia F.C.	33	(1)
- * Club domestic league appearances and goals as of 24 Jul2023

Kenedy Vidic Onyango Ouma is a Kenyan defender who features for Kenyan Premier League side Gor Mahia F.C. He formerly played for Sony Sugar F.C., Shabana F.C., F.C. Talanta, Nairobi Stima F.C., Nakumatt FC, Posta Rangers F.C., Kakamega Homeboyz F.C., and Nairobi City Stars.

== Career ==
Ouma started his club journey with the Sony Sugar U19 side in 2011. He was later loaned out to lower-tier side Shabana F.C. and then moved to the Kenyan City to join Nairobi Stima F.C.

He moved to the Kenyan topflight in 2013 after joining the now-defunct Karuturi Sports for the first leg before moving to second-tier side F.C. Talanta for the second leg. After a full season at the club, he moved to another second-tier side, Nakumatt FC until 2017.

He then joined Posta Rangers FC at the start of the 2018 season. Prior to that move, he had been rumored to be on his way to multiple league champions Gor Mahia F.C.

After, he returned westward, to Kakamega Homeboyz, and went on to complete the 2018/19 and 2019/2020 seasons before returning to Nairobi to join the freshly promoted Nairobi City Stars on an initial two-year contract before extending it further for the 2022/23 season. He scored his maiden goal for the club in October 2021 against Wazito F.C.

In July 2023, Onyango made the big move to Gor Mahia F.C. after running down his contract with Nairobi City Stars at the end of the 2022/23 Premier League season.

He scored his maiden goal for Gor Mahia on 6 January 2024 at the Kenyatta Stadium, Machakos after heading in a corner, for a 1–0 win over Posta Rangers, helping the club end the first leg of the season unbeaten.

He exited the club after two years, at the end of the 2024/25 season to become a free agent.

== CAF Inter Club competition ==
On 25 Aug 2024, Onyango made his debut in the 2024–25 CAF Champions League qualifying rounds after clocking 28 minutes in Gor Mahia's 5–1 win over Sudan's El Merriekh Bentiu during a first round second leg tie. He earned his second game on 15 Sep 2024 in another home game played at Nyayo Stadium against Egypt's Al Ahly FC.

== Style of play ==
Onyango has is known for his combative nature, and for scoring headers especially from corners.
