= Davis Agesa =

Kenyan footballer (born 1995)

Davis Agesa Amuyunzu
Personal information
- Full name: Davis Agesa Amuyunzu
- Date of birth: 27 December 1995 (age 30)
- Height: 1.87 m (6 ft 2 in)
- Position: Striker

Youth career
- 2014: Vapor Sports

Senior career*
Years	Team	Apps	(Gls)
2015	Revengers FC		
2015-2016	Vapor Sports		
2017	Nairobi City Stars	25	(7)
2018	Thika United F.C.	10	(0)
2018-2020	Nairobi City Stars	35	(10)
2020-22	Nairobi City Stars	55	(3)
2022-23	F.C. Talanta	0	(0)
2023-	MCF		
- * Club domestic league appearances and goals as of 19:31, 16 May 2023 (UTC)

Davis Agesa Amuyunzu is a Kenyan striker formerly of Kenyan Premier League sides Nairobi City Stars, F.C. Talanta, and now in the ranks of Kenyan second-tier side MCF.

== Club career ==
Agesa is reported to have had a brief stint with Seychelle's side Revengers FC in 2015, a club he joined from lower-tier side Vapor Sports.

In 2017 Agesa joined Nairobi City Stars and went on to score seven goals by the end of the season. He moved to the Kenyan Premier League side Thika United F.C. in the first part of the 2018 season before returning to City Stars after featuring in ten games.

He was to head out for a short stint in Asia before returning to City Stars for the second part of the 2018/19 season.

He was part of City Stars' second-tier title-winning 2019/20 season where he became the club's top scorer in the second tier. He then committed to stay on at the club for two further seasons upon the team's return to the top tier. He left City Stars at the end of his term for F.C. Talanta whom he left to join MCF.

He registered two assists on his premier league debut for City Stars in the 2020-21 FKF Premier League season-opener in Narok in late November 2020. He went on to score three times across two topflight seasons at City Stars.

== Misfortune ==
In mid 2023, Agesa is said to have been duped by an agent and flown to Malaysia for a deal that never materialised. He is said to have been stranded and only returned home after an effort initiated by global player union FIFPRO.

== Honours ==
=== Club ===
Nairobi City Stars

- National Super League'

(gold) Champions (1): 2019-20
