= John Kamau John =

Kenyan footballer (born 1995)

John Kamau
Personal information
- Full name: John Kamau
- Date of birth: 21 December 1995 (age 30)
- Height: 1.73 m (5 ft 8 in)
- Position: Winger

Team information
- Current team: Nairobi City Stars
- Number: 15

Senior career*
Years	Team	Apps	(Gls)
2016-18	Vapor Sports		
2018	Nairobi City Stars		
2018-19	Tusker F.C.	24	(4)
2020-22	Nairobi City Stars	20	(0)
- * Club domestic league appearances and goals

John Bombay Kamau (born 21 December 1995) is a Kenyan winger currently in the ranks of Kenyan Premier League side Nairobi City Stars.

== Club career ==
Kamau turned out for lower-tier side Vapor Sports before moving to Premiership side Nairobi City Stars in 2018.

After a short stint he joined Tusker F.C. in mid-2018 till the 2019 season before returning to City Stars in January of year 2020 on a short-term contract. He extended his stay for two seasons following the team's promotion to the top flight.

== Honours ==
=== Club ===
Nairobi City Stars

- National Super League: 2019-20
