= Zachary Onyango =

Kenyan footballer (born 1988)

Personal information
- Date of birth: 31 May 1988 (age 38)
- Place of birth: Siaya, Kenya
- Height: 1.84 m (6 ft 0 in)
- Position: Goalkeeper

Team information
- Current team: Nairobi City Stars

Senior career*
Years	Team	Apps	(Gls)
2006–2008	Sony Sugar	19	(0)
2009–2011	Sofapaka	16	(0)
2011–2012	Ethiopian Coffee S.C.		(0)
2013	Gor Mahia	0	(0)
2013-2015	KCB	35	(0)

International career^{‡}
2011	Kenya	1	(0)
- * Club domestic league appearances and goals as of 19:31, 12 March 2022 (UTC) ‡ National team caps and goals as of 19:31, 12 March 2022 (UTC)

Zachary Ogada Onyango (born 11 December 1988) is a retired Kenyan goalkeeper who is currently the goalkeeper trainer with Kenyan Premier League side Posta Rangers Fc

== Career ==
=== Club ===
He turned out for Kenyan Premier League sides Sony Sugar, Sofapaka F.C., KCB, Gor Mahia F.C. as well as Ethiopian Premier League side Ethiopian Coffee S.C.

Onyango won the Kenyan Premier League title twice with Sony Sugar in 2005/6 and with Sofapaka in the 2009 Kenyan Premier League season and the Ethiopian Premier League title and the Ethiopian Super Cup with Ethiopian Coffee S.C. in 2011.

While at Ethiopian Coffee S.C. he featured in the first round of the 2012 CAF Champions League in two games against eventual champions Al-Ahly SC

=== International ===
He was capped once for the Kenya national football team during an international friendly away to South Africa in Rustenburg on 9 February 2011.

== Honours ==
=== Club ===
Sony Sugar

- Kenyan Premier League

(gold) Champions (1): 2005-6
Sofapaka

- Kenyan Premier League

(gold) Champions (1): 2009
Ethiopia Coffee

- Ethiopian Premier League

(gold) Champions (1): 2011

- Ethiopian Super Cup

(gold) Champions (1): 2011
Nairobi City Stars

- Kenyan National Super League

(gold) Champions (1): 2019-20
