= Nicholas Muyoti =

Kenyan football coach

Personal information
- Full name: Nicholas Ndubi Muyoti
- Date of birth: 8 September 1976 (age 50)
- Place of birth: Kenya
- Height: 1.79 m (5 ft 10 in)
- Positions: Defender; midfielder

Senior career*
Years	Team	Apps	(Gls)
1996–1997	Kenyatta Hospital F.C.		
1997–2002	AFC Leopards		
2002–2005	Thika United F.C.		
2006	Sporting Afrique FC	13	(0)
2006–2007	Churchill Brothers S.C.		
2007–2008	Sporting Clube de Goa	14	(0)
2008–2009	Thika United F.C.	12	(12)
2009	Sher Karuturi	22	(12)
2010	Sofapaka F.C.	11	(10)
2011	AFC Leopards	20	(1)

International career^{‡}
2001–2003	Kenya	17	(2)

Managerial career
- 2012: AFC Leopards (assistant)
- 2013: AFC Leopards (team manager)
- 2013: AFC Leopards (assistant)
- 2014: Oserian F.C. (head coach)
- 2015: Oserian F.C. (head coach)
- 2016: AFC Leopards (assistant)
- 2017: Zetech University (head coach)
- 2017: Thika United F.C. (head coach)
- 2018–2019: Nzoia Sugar F.C. (head coach)
- 2019-2021: Kakamega Homeboyz F.C. (head coach)
- 2021–2025: Nairobi City Stars (head coach)
- 2025–2026: Nairobi United (head coach)
- 2026–: Kenya Police FC (head coach)
- * Club domestic league appearances and goals as of 26 March 2022 ‡ National team caps and goals as of 26 March 2022

Nicholas Ndubi Muyoti (born 8 September 1976) is a retired Kenyan international footballer. He is the current head coach of Kenyan Premier League side Kenya Police FC. Muyoti is a former Kenya captain, best remembered for lifting the Castle Lager Cup trophy in 2002.

== Early life ==
Muyoti was born on 8 September 1976 in Nairobi. He went to school at Our Lady of Mercy Primary School before moving to Mumias Boys Primary School. He then proceeded to Amukura Secondary School in Busia before ending up at Nairobi's Upper Hill School.

== Career ==
Muyoti started out his career at lower-tier side Kenyatta Hospital F.C. while still a student at Upper Hill School.

== AFC Leopards ==
While at Kenyatta Hospital F.C. he tried out with AFC Leopards whom he joined in 1997 where he spent six seasons before heading to Thika United in 2002. He returned to the same club nine years later in 2011 to end his playing career.

== Singapore ==
After four seasons at Thika United in 2002, Muyoti moved to Sporting Afrique for the 2006 S.League,. Described as a conscientious leader, Muyoti captained Sporting Afrique at the 2006 S.League,

== India ==
After Singapore, Muyoti moved to Churchill Brothers for 2006, the captain was Man of the Match as they drew with Sporting Clube de Goa 1-1 despite earning a yellow card which left him out for the 11th round.

He then moved to Sporting Clube de Goa for 2007 season, the Kenyan had to leave the Flaming Oranje in 2008 due to injury, out for eight months.

== Return to Kenya ==
After India, Muyoti returned to Thika United for a season in 2008 then made moves in each of the next seasons to Sher Karuturi, Sofapaka F.C. before finally returning 'home' to AFC Leopards in 2011 where he hanged his boots as a player at the close of that season.

== Swindon Town ==
In late 2002, it was reported that Muyoti had caught the eye of English side Swindon Town as the Kenya national football team toured England for a series of friendly games. The reports later stated the deal did not materialize.

== National team ==
While at AFC Leopards, Muyoti was called up to the Kenya national football team in 2001 and played for the national team till the year 2003.

He was handed his first cap at the Amahoro Stadium by Reinhard Fabisch in a game against Ethiopia in the final of 2001 CECAFA Cup.

== Management ==
Muyoti began his journey to coaching when, at the end of the 2011 season at AFC Leopards, he was named the assistant coach, then team manager, and back as an assistant. He left the club towards the end of 2013 to join Oserian FC as head coach before returning to AFC Leopards in 2016 as an assistant coach.

He moved to Zetech University at the onset of 2017 for a short stint before heading to Thika United as an assistant coach first, then head coach. Head coach roles at Nzoia Sugar, Kakamega Homeboyz then to his current station Nairobi City Stars then followed.

In mid January 2025 he moved to Kenyan second-tier side Nairobi United and went on to complete an unprecedented double in winning the Super League title and earning the team promotion to the Kenyan Premier League before topping it up with the domestic Cup, Mozzart Bet Cup, to book a place in the 2025–26 CAF Confederation Cup.

== Career statistics ==
=== International ===
As of 27 April 2022

Kenya
Year	Apps	Goals
2001	1	0
2002	13	2
2003	3	0
Total	17	2

=== International goals ===
As of 27 April 2022 (scores and results list Kenya's goal tally first)

Goal	Date	Venue	Opponent	Score	Result	Competition
1.	18 May 2002	Sheikh Amri Abeid Memorial Stadium, Dar es Salaam, Tanzania	Tanzania	0–2	0-5	Friendly
2.	23 October 2002	CCM Kirumba Stadium, Mwanza, Tanzania	South Africa	1–1	1-1	Castle Lager Cup (East Africa)

== Honours ==
=== Club ===
AFC Leopards

- Moi Golden Cup: 2001

Nairobi United

- Mozzart Bet Cup: 2025
- Kenyan National Super League: 2024-25

Kenya

- 2002 CECAFA Cup
- Castle Lager Cup (East Africa): 2002
