= 2022–23 Kariobangi Sharks FC season =

Kenyan football club season

Kariobangi Sharks
2022-23 KPL season
- Owner: Nick Mwendwa
- Chairman: Robert Maoga
- Head coach: William Muluya
- Stadium: Utalii grounds
- Kenyan Premier League: 11th
- 2022-23 Mozzart Cup: Qtrs
- Top goalscorer: League: Tyson Otieno, (9); All: Tyson Otieno, (9)
- Biggest win: 5-1 vs Posta Rangers (A), 22 Jan 2022, 2022-23 KPL
- Biggest defeat: 6-1 vs Kakamega Homeboyz (H), 30 Apr 2023, Mozzart Cup

The 2022-23 season was Kariobangi Sharks seventh straight in the Kenyan Premier League following their promotion from the National Super League at the end of the year 2016.

Sharks kicked off the 2022–23 season with a 2–2 away draw to FC Talanta and closed the season with a 1–0 loss at home to AFC Leopards. The team ended the league placed eleventh with 41 points, four less compared to the 2021–22 season after registering 10 wins ten draws and 13 losses.

Prior to the season start, Sharks exercised a clear out allowing virtually all players to exit the club replacing them with a new set of 18 players including youngsters from the Sharks Academy. The transfers saw club standout Patilah Omoto, who joined the club as a minor in the year 2005, also leave the team for the first time ever to join Kenya Police FC.

The 2021-22 season top club scorer Felix Oluoch and forward Douglas Mokaya both exited the club to join Coastal side Bandari, as the trio of Thomas Teka, Eric Mmata and Boniface Onyango decamped to Tusker FC. The much hyped flyer Enock Wanyama aalso left the club and became a free agent.

Youngsters such as Mathew Kibiwott stepped up to the senior team joining off season arrivials including centre backs Timothy Ekhavi from Luanda Villa, Kevinluke Otiala and Dan Guya from St. Joseph's and Sofapaka FC, respectively, as well as the duo of Kevin Musamali and Shariff Musa from Soy United.

Attacking midfielder Tyson Otieno, signed at the start of the season from Wazito FC, emerged as the clubs top performer after top scoring with nine league goals besides registering ten league assists. Moses Shikanda signed from Green Commandoes at the start of the season ended up as second best top scorer with eight league goals.

Unlike in the 2021–22 season, the domestic cup returned with Sharks making it to the quarterfinals for the seventh time in the last eight seasons. The team lost to Kakamega Homeboyz at this stage.

== Technical Bench ==
Position	Staff
Head coach	(Kenya) William Muluya
Assistant head coach	(Kenya) Ezekiel Seda
Team Manager	(Kenya) Mathew Sam
Goalkeeper Trainer	(Kenya) Francis Dick
Head of Medical/Physio	(Kenya) John Kemboi
Kit Manager	(Kenya) Paul Otieno

Source: Soka

== Transfers ==
The original transfer window for the 202–23 season was between 11 July and 31 August 2022. But reopened from 20 October to 21 November 2022 following the league's postponement necessitated by a Kenya's suspension by FIFA, and the takover of football administratiion by an FKF Caretaker Committee. The mid transfer window, set by Football Kenya Federation who resumed running the game in September 2022, opened on 27 February 2023 and closed on 27 March 2023 .

=== In ===
Date	Pos.	Player	From	Ref.
19 Sep 2022	ST	(Kenya) Paul Okoth	(Kenya) Dimba Patriots	
19 Sep 2022	GK	(Kenya) Gedion Ogweno	Kenya Police FC	
19 Sep 2022	CB	(Kenya) Kevinluke Otiala	(Kenya) St. Joseph's Nakuru	
19 Sep 2022	FW	(Kenya) Leonlevitt Otieno	(Kenya) St. Joseph's Nakuru	
19 Sep 2022	ST	(Kenya) Titus Kapchanga	(Kenya) Nzoia Sugar FC	
19 Sep 2022	ST	(Kenya) Moses Shikanda	(Kenya) Green Commandoes FC	
23 Sep 2022	CB	(Kenya) Timothy Ekhavi	(Kenya) Luanda Villa FC	
25 Sep 2022	ST	(Kenya) Franklin Sileh	(Kenya) Nairobi United	
3 Oct 2022	FW	(Kenya) Dhulkifli Mohammed	(Kenya) Shabana FC	
6 Oct 2022	AM	(Kenya) Mathew Kibiwott	(Kenya) Sharks Youth FC	
6 Oct 2022	DM	(Kenya) Kevin Wangaya	(Kenya) Ligi Ndogo	
28 Nov 2022	ST	(Kenya) Shariff Musa	(Kenya) Soy United	
28 Nov 2022	DF	(Kenya) Kevin Musamali	(Kenya) Soy United	
28 Nov 2022	DM	(Kenya) Biron Otieno	(Kenya) Kibera Black Stars	
28 Nov 2022	ST	(Kenya) Tyson Omondi	(Kenya) Migori Youth FC	
28 Nov 2022	CB	(Kenya) Dan Guya	(Kenya) Bandari	
28 Nov 2022	CB	(Kenya) Collins Obanda	(Kenya) Muhoroni Youth FC	
2 Dec 2022	AM	(Kenya) Tyson Otieno	(Kenya) Wazito FC	

=== Out ===
Date	Pos.	Player	To	Ref.
20 May 2022	FW	(Kenya) Patrick Otieno	(Kenya) Posta Rangers	
20 May 2022	GK	(Kenya) Brandon Obiero	(Kenya) Posta Rangers	
25 Jun 2022	FW	(Kenya) Enock Wanyama	Free Agents	
25 Jun 2022	GK	(Kenya) Brian Olang'o	Free Agents	
30 Jun 2022	CB	(Uganda) Ziyadi Kiwanuka	(Kenya) Fortune FC	
12 Jul 2022	ST	(Kenya) Felix Oluoch	(Kenya) Bandari	
12 Jul 2022	AM	(Kenya) Douglas Mokaya	(Kenya) Bandari	
22 Jul 2022	CB	(Kenya) Thomas Teka	(Kenya) Tusker FC	
22 Jul 2022	FW	(Kenya) Eric Mmata	(Kenya) Tusker FC	
22 Jul 2022	FW	(Kenya) Boniface Onyango	(Kenya) Tusker FC	
16 Jul 2022	DM	(South Sudan) Patilah Omoto	Kenya Police FC	
12 Nov 2022	FW	(Kenya) Stephen Otieno	(Kenya) Nzoia Sugar FC	
	ST	(Kenya) Henry Juma	(Kenya) Bidco United	
	RB	(Kenya) Samuel Olwande	(Kenya) Sofapaka FC	

=== In ===
Date	Pos.	Player	From	Ref.
29 Mar 2023	GK	(Kenya) Sepstianos Wekesa	(Kenya) APS Bomet	
29 Mar 2023	CB	(Kenya) Biko Omollo	(Kenya) Green Commandoes	

=== Out ===
Date	Pos.	Player	To	Ref.
2 Feb 2023	CB	(Kenya) Alphonse Omija	(Oman) Dhofar Club	
29 Mar 2023	CB	(Kenya) Gospel Otieno	(Kenya) Kakamega Homeboyz	
29 Mar 2023	ST	(Kenya) Tyson Omondi	(Kenya) Sofapaka FC	
29 Mar 2023	DM	(Kenya) Issa Lumumba	(Kenya) Ulinzi Stars	
29 Mar 2023	ST	(Kenya) Titus Kapchanga	(Kenya) Muranga SEAL	

== Competitions ==
=== Overall record ===
Competition	First match	Last match	Starting round	Final position	Record							
Competition	First match	Last match	Starting round	Final position	Pld	W	D	L	GF	GA	GD	Win %
2022-23 KPL	20 Nov 2022	25 Jun 2023	Matchday 1	10th	34	10	11	13	46	46	+0	29.41
2022-23 Mozzart Bet Cup	4 Mar 2023	1 Jul 2023	Round of 32	Qtrs	3	2	0	1	8	7	+1	66.67
Total					37	12	11	14	54	53	+1	32.43

Source: Soccerway

=== Kenyan Premier League ===
==== Results summary ====
Overall								Home						Away					
Pld	W	D	L	GF	GA	GD	Pts	W	D	L	GF	GA	GD	W	D	L	GF	GA	GD
34	10	11	13	46	26	+20	41	4	6	7	22	6	+16	6	5	6	24	20	+4

Source: Soccerway

==== Results by round ====
Round	1	2	3	4	5	6	7	8	9	10	11	12	13	14	15	16	17	18	19	20	21	22	23	24	25	26	27	28	29	30	31	32	33	34
Ground	A	H	H	A	H	A	A	H	A	H	A	H	H	A	H	A	H	A	H	A	H	A	H	A	A	H	A	H	A	H	A	H	A	H
Result	D	W	L	W	D	D	D	L	L	D	W	W	D	D	L	D	W	L	W	W	D	W	L	L	L	L	W	D	L	L	W	D	L	L
Position	7	3	6	8	11	13	13		11	10	9	12	12	11	13	11	10	10	9	9	8	6	8	10	13	11	11	12	11	13	10	10	10	11
Points	1	4	4	7	8	9	10	10	10	11	14	17	18	19	19	20	23	23	26	29	30	33	33	33	33	33	36	37	37	37	40	41	41	41

Source: Soccerway
A = Away; H = Home; W = Win; D = Draw; L = Loss; P = Postponed

==== Score overview ====
Win Draw Loss

Opposition	Home score	Away score	Aggregate score	Double
AFC Leopards	0-1	1-1	1-2	No
Bandari	1-0	0-1	1-1	No
Bidco Utd	1-1	2-1	3-2	No
Gor Mahia	1-1	0-2	1-3	No
Kakamega Homeboyz	1-3	1-1	2-4	No
KCB	2-1	1-2	3-3	No
Kenya Police	1-2	2-3	3-5	No
Mathare United	2-1	2-1	4-2	Yes
Nairobi City Stars	2-2	0-0	2-2	No
Nzoia Sugar	1-3	1-0	2-3	No
Posta Rangers	0-0	5-1	5-1	No
Sofapaka	2-0	0-1	2-1	No
Talanta	2-2	2-2	4-4	No
Tusker	0-1	1-1	1-2	No
Ulinzi Stars	3-2	0-1	3-3	No
Wazito	2-2	1-3	3-5	No
Vihiga Bullets	3-3	3-1	6-4	No

==== Matches ====
Win Draw Loss Fixtures

The 2022-23 Kenyan Premier League season began on 19 November 2022 and ended on 25 Jun 2023.

20 November 2022 1	FC Talanta	2-2	Kariobangi Sharks	Nairobi
15:00 UTC+3	Yakhama 4'; Jairo 70'	Report	Musa 6', 26'

27 November 2022 2	Kariobangi Sharks	3-2	Ulinzi Stars	Nairobi
15:00 UTC+3	Musamali 37'; Omoto 42'; Tyson 44'	Report	Muchiri 30'; Simiyu 71'	Stadium: Dandora Stadium

18 December 2022 3	Kariobangi Sharks	1-1	Gor Mahia	Nairobi
15:00 UTC+3	Tyson 71'	Report	Omalla 69'	Stadium: Dandora Stadium

21 December 2022 4	Nairobi City Stars	1-1	Kariobangi Sharks	Nairobi
15:00 UTC+3	Owino 5'	Report	Okoth 19'; Alushula (red card) 89'	Stadium: Ruaraka Stadium

4 January 2023 5	Kakamega Homeboyz	1-1	Kariobangi Sharks	Kakamega
15:00 UTC+3	Karamor 69'	Report	Musamali 86' (pen.)	Stadium: Bukhungu Stadium

8 January 2023 6	Kariobangi Sharks	1-2	Kenya Police FC	Nairobi
15:00 UTC+3	Omoto 14'	Report	Rupia 26' (pen.); Omondi 90+2'

15 January 2023 7	KCB	2-1	Kariobangi Sharks	Nairobi
15:00 UTC+3	Adem 35' (pen.); Mutinda 90+4'	Report	Musamali 90+7' (pen.)	Stadium: Kasarani Annex

18 January 2023 8	Kariobangi Sharks	3-3	Vihiga Bullets	Nairobi
15:00 UTC+3	Shikanda 35', 38'; Maina 62'	Report	Masamba 22'; Ogolla 78'; Kalwale 84' (pen.)	Stadium: KAsarani Annex

22 January 2023 9	Posta Rangers	1-5	Kariobangi Sharks
15:00 UTC+3	Marita 22'	Report	Musamali 38'; Tyson 40', 90+1'; Imbali 44'; Shikanda 63'

25 January 2023 10	Kariobangi Sharks	1-0	Bandari	Nairobi
15:00 UTC+3	Musa 87'	Report		Stadium: Kasarani Annex

28 January 2023 11	Kariobangi Sharks	1-1	Bidco United	Nairobi
15:00 UTC+3	Musamali 90+2' (pen.)	Report	Juma 3'	Stadium: KAsarani Annex

4 February 2023 12	Tusker FC	1-1	Kariobangi Sharks	Nairobi
15:00 UTC+3	Majak 78'	Report	Tyson 50'

8 February 2023 13	Kariobangi Sharks	1-3	Nzoia Sugar	Nairobi
15:00 UTC+3	Imbali 10'	Report	Mwangi 50', 51'; Ekhavi 74' (o.g.)	Stadium: KAsarani Annex

15 February 2023 14	Kariobangi Sharks	1-2	Mathare United	Nairobi
15:00 UTC+3	Kibiwott 48'	Report	Ange 29' (pen.); Otieno 84'	Stadium: Kasarani Stadium

19 February 2023 15	AFC Leopards	0-0	Kariobangi Sharks	Nairobi
15:00 UTC+3		Report		Stadium: Kasarani Stadium

24 February 2023 16	Kariobangi Sharks	2-0	Sofapaka FC	Nairobi
15:00 UTC+3		Report	Maina 48'; Shikanda 75'	Stadium: Kasarani Stadium

1 March 2023 17	Wazito FC	1-3	Kariobangi Sharks
15:00 UTC+3	? 22'	Report	Okoth 18', 54'; Omoto 25'

8 March 2023 18	Kenya Police FC	3-2	Kariobangi Sharks	Nairobi
15:00 UTC+3	Rupia 13'; Miheso 48'; Abuya 49'	Report	Omoto 31'; Tyson 86'	Stadium: Police Sacco

12 March 2023 19	Kariobangi Sharks	2-1	KCB	Nairobi
15:00 UTC+3	Masaba 32'; Omoto 50'	Report	Kahiro 69'	Stadium: Kasarani Annex

16 March 2023 20	Vihiga Bullets	1-3	Kariobangi Sharks	Kakamega
15:00 UTC+3	Alushula 15'; Shikanda 35', 45+1'	Report		Stadium: Bukhungu Stadium

29 March 2023 21	Kariobangi Sharks	2-2	Wazito FC	Nairobi
15:00 UTC+3	Shikanda 5'; Ngunyi 90+8'	Report	Okoth 3'; Owino 31'	Stadium: Kasarani Annex

5 April 2023 22	Bidco United	1-2	Kariobangi Sharks	Nairobi
15:00 UTC+3	Yobo 83'	Report	Shikanda 31'; Kamau 90+3'	Stadium: Kasarani Annex

9 April 2023 23	Gor Mahia	2-0	Kariobangi Sharks	Nairobi
15:00 UTC+3	Austin 22', 55'	Report		Stadium: Kasarani Stadium

12 April 2023 24	Kariobangi Sharks	1-3	Kakamega Homeboyz	Nairobi
15:00 UTC+3	Otieno 9'	Report	Otieno 15'; Mudavadi 87'; Masinza 90+2'	Stadium: Kasarani Stadium

16 April 2023 25	Ulinzi Stars	1-0	Kariobangi Sharks	Nairobi
15:00 UTC+3	Muchika 16'	Report		Stadium: Ulinzi Complex

22 April 2023 26	Kariobangi Sharks	1-2	Nairobi City Stars	Nairobi
15:00 UTC+3	Ngunyi 82'	Report	Etemesi 57'; Kapen 66'	Stadium: Kasarani Annex

25 April 2023 27	Mathare United	1-2	Kariobangi Sharks	Nairobi
15:00 UTC+3	Wekesa 22'	Report	Tyson 22' (pen.), 54' (pen.)	Stadium: Kasarani Stadium

4 May 2023 28	Kariobangi Sharks	0-0	Posta Rangers	Nairobi
15:00 UTC+3		Report		Stadium: Kasarani Annex

7 May 2023 29	Sofapaka FC	1-0	Kariobangi Sharks	Nairobi
15:00 UTC+3	Sunday 15'	Report

13 May 2023 30	Kariobangi Sharks	0-1	Tusker FC	Nairobi
15:00 UTC+3		Report	Ojok 2' (yellow card) 37' (yellow-red card) 80'

27 May 2023 31	Nzoia Sugar	0-1	Kariobangi Sharks	Bungoma
15:00 UTC+3		Report	Imbali 66'	Stadium: Sudi Stadium

3 June 2023 32	Kariobangi Sharks	2-2	FC Talanta	Nairobi
15:00 UTC+3	Tyson 53'; Musa 65'	Report	Ochieng 81'; Machaka 84'	Stadium: Kasarani Annex

15 June 2023 33	Bandari	1-0	Kariobangi Sharks	Mombasa
15:00 UTC+3	Hassan 40'	Report		Stadium: Mbaraki

22 June 2023 34	Kariobangi Sharks	0-1	AFC Leopards	Nairobi
15:00 UTC+3		Report	Omune 59' (pen.)	Stadium: Kasarani Annex

=== Mozzart Bet Cup ===
Win Draw Loss Fixtures

4 Mar 2023 Round of 32	Marula FC	0-6	Kariobangi Sharks	Naivasha
15:00 UTC+3		Report	Okoth 16'; Otieno 26'; Maina 33'; Wangaya 67'; Ngunyi 83'; Musa 89' (pen.)	Stadium: Longonot Horticulture

1 Apr 2023 Round of 16	Kariobangi Sharks	1-0	Equity Bank FC	Nairobi
15:00 UTC+3	Okoth 10'	Report		Stadium: Nyayo Stadium

30 Apr 2023 Qtrs	Kakamega Homeboyz	6-1	Kariobangi Sharks	Nairobi
15:00 UTC+3	Hassan 37'; Otiala 39' (o.g.); Sifuna 43'; Ogolla 52', 80'; Okanda 58'	Report	Imbali 50'; Otiala (red card) 57'	Stadium: Kasarani Stadium

== Statistics ==
=== Goalscorers ===
No.	Pos.	Player	Premier League	Mozzart Cup	Total
18	AM	(Kenya) Tyson Otieno	9	0	9
26	ST	(Kenya) Moses Shikanda	8	0	8
19	ST	(Kenya) Paul Okoth	5	2	7
13	RB	(Kenya) Kevin Musamali	6	0	6
10	AM	(Kenya) Fortune Omoto	5	0	5
17	FW	(Kenya) Sigmun Maina	3	1	4
7	FW	(Kenya) Sharif Musa	2	1	3
28	FW	(Kenya) Patrick Ngunyi	2	1	3
21	FW	(Kenya) Leonlevitt Otieno	1	1	2
22	FW	(Kenya) Julius Masaba	2	0	2
23	CM	(Kenya) Keith Imbali	1	1	2
3	RB	(Kenya) Fredrick Alushula	1	0	1
20	CM	(Kenya) Mathew Kibiwott	1	0	1
18	AM	(Kenya) Kevin Wangaya	0	1	1
Own goals			0	0	0
Missing			0	0	0
Totals			46	8	54
