= 2025–26 Kariobangi Sharks FC season =

Kenyan football club season

Kariobangi Sharks
2025-26 KPL season
- Owner: Nick Mwendwa
- Chairman: Robert Maoga
- Head coach: William Muluya
- Stadium: Utalii grounds
- Kenyan Premier League: 16th
- 2025-26 Mozzart Cup: Pre-Qtrs
- Top goalscorer: League: Humphrey Aroko, (12); All: Humphrey Aroko, (18)
- Biggest win: 6-0 vs Sofapaka FC (H), 31 May 2026, 2025-26 KPL
- Biggest defeat: 4-1 vs Gor Mahia (H), 6 Jan 2026, 2025-26 KPL

The 2025-26 season was Kariobangi Sharks tenth straight in the Kenyan Premier League following their promotion from the National Super League at the end of the year 2016.

The team endured a tough camapaign in the 2025-26 season season, ending up in 16th spot in what was their worst positional finish in the ten-year stay in Kenya's top flight. 38 points earned from eight wins, 14 draws and 12 loses destined Sharks to relegation/promotion playoff berth with the third best team in the second tier league. However, the playoff was shrouded in controversy and legal proceedings following the Football Kenya Federation applicaion of different rules governing the leagues for the season contrary to what had been applicable in the last nine seasons.

The transfer front saw the return of prodigal son and former team skipper Patilah Omoto after stints at Kenya Police FC and Posta Rangers while his name sake Fortune went out to join KCB.

In spite of being in the relegation red zone, Sharks had an individual standout performer in teenager Humphrey Aroko who top scored for the club after claiming 12 of 30 league goals, and made it 18 in total from all competitions. Aroko was named the February 2026 player of the month and ultimately went on to clain the New Young Player of the season, before jetting out to Danish side FC Copenhagen who immediately loaned him out to Swedish side FC Rosengård 1917.

In the domestci cup, Sharks missed out on a place in the final eight for just the second time in ten seasons after falling to eventual winers Tusker FC 1-0 in the round of 16 at Kasarani in April 2026.

== Technical Bench ==
Position	Staff
Head coach	(Kenya) William Muluya
Assistant head coach	(Kenya) Ezekiel Seda
Team Manager	(Kenya) Mathew Sam
Goalkeeper Trainer	(Kenya) Sammy Okinda
Head of Medical/Physio	(Kenya) John Kemboi
Strength & Conditioning Coach	(Kenya) Whyvonne Isuza
Kit Manager	(Kenya) Paul Otieno

Source: Soka

== Transfers ==
The primary transfer window for the 2025-26 season opened was between 4 July - 5 September 2025 while the mid transfer window lasted between 5 January and 2 February 2026.

=== In ===
Date	Pos.	Player	From	Ref.
25 Aug 2025	CM	(Kenya) Razel Omondi	(Kenya) Sharks Youth	
18 Sep 2025	ST	(Kenya) Jahson Wakachala	(Kenya) Sharks Youth	
18 Sep 2025	CM	(Kenya) Nicholas Onyango	(Kenya) Sharks Youth	
18 Sep 2025	AM	(Kenya) Joseph Mwangi	(Kenya) Nairobi City Stars	
18 Sep 2025	DM	(Kenya) Patilah Omoto	(Kenya) Posta Rangers	
18 Sep 2025	FW	(Kenya) Markvivan Kesa	(Kenya) Naivas FC	
18 Sep 2025	FW	(Kenya) Clinton Machaka	(Kenya) FC Talanta	
18 Sep 2025	FW	(Kenya) Wayne Mbuya	(Kenya) Luanda Villa	
18 Sep 2025	MF	(Kenya) Wayne Dalvin	(Kenya) Sofapaka FC	
18 Sep 2025	GK	(Kenya) Wayne Orata	(Kenya) Dandora Youth	
18 Sep 2025	GK	(Kenya) Collins Obwalo	(Kenya) Lucky Summer FC	
18 Sep 2025	LB	(Kenya) Costah Nzuvah	(Kenya) Kibera Black Stars	

=== Out ===
Date	Pos.	Player	To	Ref.
22 Sep 2025	GK	(Kenya) Brian Odhiambo	(Kenya) Kakamega Homeboyz	
22 Sep 2025	AM	(Kenya) Fortune Omoto	(Kenya) KCB	
22 Sep 2025	AM	(Kenya) Price Musebe	(Kenya) Muranga SEAL	
22 Sep 2025	ST	(Kenya) Francis Memusi	(Kenya) Muranga SEAL	
22 Sep 2025		(Kenya) Musa Shiroya	(Kenya) Muranga SEAL	
22 Sep 2025	DF	(Kenya) Kevin Musamali	(Kenya) Shabana FC	
22 Sep 2025	DM	(Kenya) Biron Otieno	(Kenya) Shabana FC	
22 Sep 2025	GK	(Kenya) Bernard Jairo	(Kenya) Nairobi United	
22 Sep 2025	FW	(Kenya) Leonlevitt Otieno	(Kenya) Ulinzi Stars	

=== In ===
Date	Pos.	Player	From	Ref.
26 Jan 2026	ST	(Kenya) David Majak	(South Sudan) El Merriekh SC Bentiu	
26 Jan 2026	AM	(Kenya) Armstrong Omondi	(Kenya) Obunga FC	
26 Jan 2026	AM	(Kenya) Mohammed Sarwari	Kenya Police FC	
26 Jan 2026	CB	(Kenya) Eustace Chasara	Kenya Police FC	
26 Jan 2026	DM	(Kenya) Jacob Onyango	(Kenya) Mathare United	
26 Jan 2026	DM	(Kenya) Raymond Otieno	(Kenya) Soy United	
26 Jan 2026	GK	(Kenya) Daniel Kakai	(Kenya) Bandari Youth	
26 Jan 2026	DF	(Kenya) Raphael Owino	(Kenya) Lucky Summer FC	
26 Jan 2026	FW	(Kenya) Juma Izzadin	(Kenya) Tusker FC (loan)	

=== Out ===
Date	Pos.	Player	To	Ref.
14 Feb 2026	AM	(Kenya) Andres Odhiambo	(Sweden) Enköpings SK	
14 Feb 2026	AM	(Kenya) Joseph Mwangi	(Kenya) Nairobi City Stars	
14 Feb 2026	DF	(Kenya) Biko Omollo	(Kenya) Nairobi United	
14 Feb 2026	ST	(Kenya) Jahson Wakachala	(Kenya)	
14 Feb 2026	DF	(Kenya) Clinton Machaka	(Kenya)	

== Competitions ==
=== Overall record ===
Competition	First match	Last match	Starting round	Final position	Record							
Competition	First match	Last match	Starting round	Final position	Pld	W	D	L	GF	GA	GD	Win %
2025-26 KPL	20 Sep 2025	31 May 2026	Matchday 1	16th	34	8	14	12	30	33	−3	23.53
2025-26 Mozzart Bet Cup	8 Mar 2026	14 Jun 2026	Round of 64	Pre Qtrs	3	2	0	1	11	1	+10	66.67
Total					37	10	14	13	41	34	+7	27.03

Source: Soccerway

=== Kenyan Premier League ===
==== Results summary ====
Overall								Home						Away					
Pld	W	D	L	GF	GA	GD	Pts	W	D	L	GF	GA	GD	W	D	L	GF	GA	GD
34	8	14	12	30	33	−3	38	5	5	7	19	17	+2	3	9	5	11	16	−5

Source: Soccerway

==== Results by round ====
Round	1	2	3	4	5	6	7	8	9	10	11	12	13	14	15	16	17	18	19	20	21	22	23	24	25	26	27	28	29	30	31	32	33	34
Ground	H	A	H	A	H	A	H	A	H	H	A	H	A	H	A	A	A	A	H	A	H	A	H	A	H	A	A	H	H	A	H	A	H	H
Result	D	D	L	W	L	L	D	L	L	D	D	L	L	W	D	D	L	D	W	D	D	W	L	W	L	L	D	L	W	D	W	D	D	W
Position																																		16
Points	1	2	2	5	5	5	6	6	6	7	8	8	8	11	12	13	13	14	17	18	19	22	22	25	25	25	26	26	29	30	33	34	35	38

Source: Soccerway
A = Away; H = Home; W = Win; D = Draw; L = Loss; P = Postponed

==== Score overview ====
Win Draw Loss

Opposition	Home score	Away score	Aggregate score	Double
APS Bomet	1-2	1-0	2-2	No
AFC Leopards	1-1	0-1	1-2	No
Bandari	0-0	0-0	0-0	No
Bidco Utd	1-0	0-0	1-0	No
Gor Mahia	1-4	0-0	1-4	No
Kakamega Homeboyz	2-2	0-2	2-4	No
KCB	0-1	1-1	1-2	No
Kenya Police	0-1	1-1	1-2	No
Mara Sugar	0-1	0-2	0-3	No
Mathare United	1-1	2-1	3-1	No
Murang'a Seal	1-0	0-0	1-0	No
Nairobi United	2-0	2-4	4-4	No
Posta Rangers	1-2	1-1	2-3	No
Shabana	0-0	2-1	2-1	No
Sofapaka	6-0	0-0	6-0	No
Tusker	1-2	1-2	2-4	No
Ulinzi Stars	1-0	0-0	1-0	No

==== Matches ====
Win Draw Loss Fixtures

The 2025-26 Kenyan Premier League season began on 29 September 2025 and ended on 31 May 2026.

20 September 2025 1	Kariobangi Sharks	0-0	Bandari	Nairobi
15:00 UTC+3		Report

24 September 2025 2	Ulinzi Stars	0-0	Kariobangi Sharks	Nairobi
15:00 UTC+3		Report		Stadium: Ulinzi Complex

30 September 2025 3	Kariobangi Sharks	0-1	KCB	Nairobi
15:00 UTC+3		Report	Omondi 36'

5 October 2025 4	Mathare United	1-2	Kariobangi Sharks	Nairobi
15:00 UTC+3	Asieche 90+7'	Report	? 22' (o.g.); Kesa 65'

25 October 2025 5	Kariobangi Sharks	1-2	APS Bomet	Nairobi
15:00 UTC+3	Kesa 8'	Report	Mogasa 82'; Wasai 84'

29 October 2025 6	Tusker FC	2-1	Kariobangi Sharks	Nairobi
15:00 UTC+3	Oguta 45+3'; Kapaito 59' (pen.)	Report	Andres 81'

1 November 2025 7	Kariobangi Sharks	0-0	Shabana FC	Nairobi
15:00 UTC+3		Report

8 November 2025 8	Nairobi United	4-2	Kariobangi Sharks	Nairobi
15:00 UTC+3	Karamor 10', 48'; Owino 34'; Machaka 42'	Report	Omollo 2'; Aroko 67'

23 November 2025 10	Kariobangi Sharks	1-1	AFC Leopards	Nairobi
15:00 UTC+3	Aroko 8'	Report	Omune 62'	Stadium: Kasarani Stadium

30 November 2025 11	Muranga SEAL	0-0	Kariobangi Sharks	Muranga
15:00 UTC+3		Report		Stadium: SportPesa Arena

6 December 2025 12	Kariobangi Sharks	0-1	Kenya Police FC	Nairobi
15:00 UTC+3		Report	Omar 55'	Attendance: Kasarani Annex

13 December 2025 13	Mara Sugar FC	2-0	Kariobangi Sharks	Awendo
15:00 UTC+3	Owili 51'; Cheruiyot 67'	Report		Stadium: Green Stadium

18 December 2025 14	Kariobangi Sharks	1-0	Bidco United	Nairobi
15:00 UTC+3	Aroko 85'	Report		Attendance: Kasarani Annex

22 December 2025 15	Sofapaka FC	0-0	Kariobangi Sharks	Nairobi
15:00 UTC+3		Report		Attendance: Kasarani Annex

6 January 2026 9	Kariobangi Sharks	1-4	Gor Mahia FC	Nairobi
15:00 UTC+3	Aroko 57'	Report	Ben Stanley 20'; Ebenezer 45+4'; Kapen 80'; Oluoch 83'	Attendance: Kasarani Stadium

11 January 2026 16	Posta Rangers	1-1	Kariobangi Sharks	Nairobi
15:00 UTC+3	Mwema 8'	Report	Aroko 25'	Attendance: Kasarani Stadium

18 January 2026 17	Kakamega Homeboyz	2-0	Kariobangi Sharks	Kakamega
15:00 UTC+3	Mudavadi 2'; Otieno 57'	Report		Stadium: Bukhungu Stadium

24 January 2026 18	Bandari	0-0	Kariobangi Sharks	Mombasa
15:00 UTC+3		Report		Stadium: Mbaraki Sports Club

1 February 2026 19	Kariobangi Sharks	1-0	Ulinzi Stars	Nairobi
15:00 UTC+3	Aroko 40'	Report

15 February 2026 20	KCB	1-1	Kariobangi Sharks	Nairobi
15:00 UTC+3	Omoto 87'	Report	Aroko 22'

21 February 2026 23	Kariobangi Sharks	1-1	Mathare United	Nairobi
15:00 UTC+3	Otiala 78'	Report	Makwata 46'

26 February 2026 22	APS Bomet	0-1	Kariobangi Sharks	Kericho
15:00 UTC+3		Report	Salum 82'	Stadium: Green Stadium

2 March 2026 21	Kariobangi Sharks	1-2	Tusker FC	Nairobi
15:00 UTC+3	Aroko 19'	Report	Oduor 17'; Simiyu 78'

15 March 2026 24	Shabana FC	1-2	Kariobangi Sharks	Kisii
15:00 UTC+3	Michira 50'	Report	Razel 80'; Kesa 82'	Stadium: Gusii Stadium

22 March 2026 25	Kariobangi Sharks	1-2	Posta Rangers	Nairobi
15:00 UTC+3	Aroko 73'	Report	Macharia 32', 61'	Attendance: Police Sacco

29 March 2026 26	AFC Leopards	1-0	Kariobangi Sharks	Nairobi
15:00 UTC+3	Tyson 58'	Report

4 April 2026 27	Gor Mahia FC	0-0	Kariobangi Sharks	Nairobi
15:00 UTC+3		Report

18 April 2026 28	Kariobangi Sharks	0-1	Mara Sugar FC	Nairobi
15:00 UTC+3		Report	Ndayala 22'

25 April 2026 29	Kariobangi Sharks	1-0	Muranga SEAL	Nairobi
15:00 UTC+3	Mbulere 12'	Report

3 May 2026 30	Bidco United	0-0	Kariobangi Sharks	Nairobi
15:00 UTC+3		Report

10 May 2026 31	Kariobangi Sharks	2-0	Nairobi United	Nairobi
15:00 UTC+3	Aroko 34'; Mbulere 39'	Report

23 May 2026 33	Kariobangi Sharks	2-2	Kakamega Homeboyz	Nairobi
15:00 UTC+3	Majak 22'; Opande 90+3'	Report	Majak 34' (pen.); Nyabuto 78'

27 May 2026 32	Kenya Police FC	1-1	Kariobangi Sharks	Nairobi
15:00 UTC+3	Awesu 68'	Report	Omoto 79'

27 May 2026 34	Kariobangi Sharks	6-0	Sofapaka FC	Nairobi
15:00 UTC+3	Aroko 18', 57', 65' (pen.); Omollo 28'; Razel 59', 82'	Report		Stadium: Kasarani Annex

=== Mozzart Bet Cup ===
Win Draw Loss Fixtures

7 Feb 2026 Round of 64	Pwani Oil	0-7	Kariobangi Sharks	Mombasa
15:00 UTC+3	Ngurumo 10'		Ngume 32'; Salum 53'; Aroko 67', 83'; Chesara 80'; Izzadin 89', 90+4'	Stadium: Mbaraki Grounds

8 Mar 2026 Round of 32	Kariobangi Sharks	4-0	KU Hardnuts	Nairobi
15:00 UTC+3	Aroko 51', 66', 90', 90+1'			Stadium: Kasarani Annex

10 Apr 2026 Round of 16	Tusker FC	1-0	Kariobangi Sharks	Nairobi
15:00 UTC+3	Simiyu 9'	Report		Stadium: Kasarani Stadium

== Statistics ==
=== Goalscorers ===
No.	Pos.	Player	Premier League	Mozzart Cup	Total
18	AM	(Kenya) Humphrey Aroko	12	6	18
8	FW	(Kenya) Markvivan Kesa	3	0	3
12	AM	(Kenya) Razel Omondi	3	0	3
13	AM	(Kenya) Juma Izzadin	0	2	2
19	FW	(Kenya) Stephen Mbulere	2	0	2
23	FW	(Kenya) Frankline Omollo	2	0	2
5	CB	(Kenya) Eusters Chasara	0	1	1
6	ST	(South Sudan) David Majak	1	0	1
7	FW	(Kenya) Victor Ngume	0	1	1
9	ST	(Tanzania) Ally Salum	1	1	2
8	AM	(Kenya) Andres Odhiambo	1	0	1
20	DM	(Kenya) Patilah Omoto	1	0	1
25	CB	(Kenya) Kevinluke Otiala	1	0	1
27	CB	(Kenya) Faiz Opande	1	0	1
Own goals			1	0	1
Missing			1	0	1
Totals			30	11	41

== Awards ==
=== Players ===
No.	Pos.	Player	Award	Ref
18	AM	(Kenya) Humphrey Aroko	Feb 2026 Player of the Month	
18	AM	(Kenya) Humphrey Aroko	2nd Runner-Up 2025 Most Promising Sports Personality of the Year (SOYA)	
18	AM	(Kenya) Humphrey Aroko	2025-26 New Player of the Year	
18	AM	(Kenya) Humphrey Aroko	2025-26 Mozzart Sport writers’ Young Player of the Season	
14	CB	(Kenya) Timothy Ekhavi	2nd Runner-up Most Disciplined Player of the season	

=== Team ===
No.	Pos.	Club	Award	Source
-	-	(Kenya) Kariobangi Sharks	Runner-up Most Disciplined Team of the Season	
