= 2020–21 Kariobangi Sharks FC season =

Kenyan football club season

Kariobangi Sharks
2020–21 KPL season
- Owner: Nick Mwendwa
- Chairman: Robert Maoga
- Head coach: William Muluya
- Stadium: Utalii grounds
- Kenyan Premier League: 5th
- 2020-21 Betway Cup: Qtrs
- Top goalscorer: League: Erick Kapaito, (24); All: Erick Kapaito, (24)
- Biggest win: 4-0 vs Wazito FC (H), 28 Nov 2020, 4-0 vs vs Vihiga United (H), 17 Jul 2021, both 2020-21 KPL
- Biggest defeat: 4-1 vs Bandari (A), 22 Jun 2021, 4-1 vs Homeboyz (A), 31 Jul 2021, both 2020-21 KPL

The 2020–21 season was Kariobangi Sharks fifth straight in the Kenyan Premier League following their promotion from the National Super League at the end of the year 2016. It was Kariobangi Shark's third season in the newly aligned Football Kenya Federation Premier League calendar following the federation's transition from a single-year season to the European-style football calendar in conformity with a CAF directive.

The 2020–21 season began on 28 November 2020 and concluded on 22 August 2021. Compared to all previous four premier league seasons, Sharks posted a record 14 wins for the first time ever, surpassing the 13 wins posted in the 2017 and 2018 seasons. Six draws (the least) and 12 losses (the most) compared to the other four seasons were the other results. The season ended after 32 games instead of 34 following the expulsion of one of the participating teams, Zoo FC.

Striker Erick Kapaito returned stronger in the season scoring 24 of the club's 45 league goals to emerge as the League's t top scorer for the season to follow up on his exploits of 2018 where he top scored for the league with 16 goals. As was the case then, he was awarded at season end as both the top scorer and Most Valuable Player (MVP).and 2020–21 seasons. as Sharks as a club took home the Fair play team award.

On the domestic cup front, Sharks made it to the quarterfinals for a sixth straight season but missed on the Betway Cup semis after a 2–0 loss to Gor Mahia FC.

== Technical Bench ==
Position	Staff
Head coach	(Kenya) William Muluya
Assistant head coach	(Kenya) Ezekiel Seda
Team Manager	(Kenya) Mathew Sam
Goalkeeper Trainer	(Kenya) Francis Dick
Head of Medical/Physio	(Kenya) John Kemboi
Kit Manager	(Kenya) Paul Otieno

Source: Soka

== Transfers ==
The primary transfer window for the 2020–21 Kenyan Premier League ran from 10 August to 2 November 2020, as the mid-season window ran from 25 January to 1 March 2021.

=== In ===
Date	Pos.	Player	From	Ref.
5 Sep 2020	GK	(Kenya) Brian Olang'o	(Kenya) KCB	
15 Sep 2020	AM	(Kenya) Reagan Odede	(Kenya) Ligi Ndogo	
16 Sep 2020	AM	(Kenya) Douglas Mokaya	(Kenya) Nairobi Stima	
10 Oct 2020	AM	(Kenya) Vincent Odongo	(Kenya) Nzoia Sugar FC	
11 Oct 2020	CB	(Kenya) Joshua Mahero	(Kenya) Nairobi Stima FC	
20 Oct 2020	ST	(Kenya) Robert Onyango	(Kenya) Lake View FC	
23 Oct 2020	CB	(Kenya) Joshua Onyango	(Kenya) Western Stima FC	
30 Oct 2020	RB	(Kenya) Fredrick Alushula	(Kenya) Green Commandoes	
2 Nov 2020	GK	(Kenya) Brandon Obiero	(Kenya) Coast Stima FC	
2 Nov 2020	CB	(Kenya) Alphonse Omija	(Kenya) Gor Mahia FC (loan)	

=== Out ===
Date	Pos.	Player	To	Ref.
21 Aug 2020	CB	(Tanzania) Amani Kyata	(Tanzania) Namungo FC	
26 Aug 2020	MF	(Kenya) Michael Bodo	(Kenya) Sofapaka FC	
26 Aug 2020	LB	(Kenya) Nixon Omondi	(Kenya) Sofapaka FC	
7 Sep 2020	DM	(Kenya) Sven Yida	(Kenya) Nairobi City Stars	
8 Sep 2020	MF	(Kenya) Vincent Wasambo	(Kenya) KCB	
8 Sep 2020	FW	(Kenya) Mike Oduor	(Kenya) KCB	
1 Oct 2020	GK	(Kenya) Brian Opondo	(Kenya) Bidco United	
19 Oct 2020	FW	(Kenya) Harrison Mwendwa	(Kenya) AFC Leopards	
19 Oct 2020	GK	(Kenya) John Oyemba	(Kenya) AFC Leopards	
2 Nov 2020	ST	(Kenya) Kevintom Machika	(Kenya)	
2 Nov 2020	ST	(Kenya) Derrick Onyango	(Kenya) Kakamega Homeboyz	
2 Nov 2020	ST	(Kenya) Lawrence Abok	(Kenya) Kakamega Homeboyz	

=== In ===
Date	Pos.	Player	From	Ref.
21 Feb 2021	AM	(Kenya) Ibrahim Kitawi	(Kenya) Free agent	
25 Feb 2021	CM	(Kenya) Ibrahim Ochieng	(Kenya) Western Stima FC	
30 Feb 2021	CM	(Kenya) Sydney Lokale	(Finland) HJK	

== Competitions ==
=== Overall record ===
Competition	First match	Last match	Starting round	Final position	Record							
Competition	First match	Last match	Starting round	Final position	Pld	W	D	L	GF	GA	GD	Win %
2020-21 KPL	28 Nov 2020	22 Aug 2021	Matchday 1	5th	32	14	6	12	45	42	+3	43.75
2020-21 Betway Cup	13 Feb 2021	4 Jul 2021	Round of 64	Qtrs	4	3	0	1	7	3	+4	75.00
Total					36	17	6	13	52	45	+7	47.22

Source: Soccerway

=== Kenyan Premier League ===
==== Results summary ====
Overall								Home						Away					
Pld	W	D	L	GF	GA	GD	Pts	W	D	L	GF	GA	GD	W	D	L	GF	GA	GD
32	14	6	12	45	42	+3	48	5	5	6	23	20	+3	9	1	6	22	22	0

Source: Soccerway

=== Betway Cup ===
Win Draw Loss Fixtures

13 Feb 2021 Round of 64	Flamingo FC	0-2 (W/O)	Kariobangi Sharks	Naivasha
15:00 UTC+3		Report		Stadium: Finlays

2 Jun 2021 Round of 32	Kariobangi Sharks	2-0	Tandaza FC	Nairobi
15:00 UTC+3	Teka 52'; Shiveka 79' (pen.)	Report		Stadium: Utalii Grounds

6 Jun 2021 Round of 16	Kariobangi Sharks	1(5)-1(3)	KCB	Nairobi
15:00 UTC+3	Masaba 26'	Report	Simiyu 16'	Stadium: Utalii Grounds

10 Jun 2021 Qtrs	Gor Mahia FC	2-0	Kariobangi Sharks	Nairobi
15:00 UTC+3	Karim 45'; Sydney 90+'	Report		Stadium: Utalii Grounds
