= 2021–22 Kariobangi Sharks FC season =

Kenyan football club season

Kariobangi Sharks
2021-22 KPL season
- Owner: Nick Mwendwa
- Chairman: Robert Maoga
- Head coach: William Muluya
- Stadium: Utalii grounds
- Kenyan Premier League: 10th
- Top goalscorer: League: Felix Oluoch, (12); All: Felix Oluoch, (12)
- Biggest win: 6-0 vs Mathare United (A), 31 Oct 2021, 2021-22 KPL
- Biggest defeat: 3-1 vs Kenya Police FC (H), 8 Dec 2021, 3-1 vs Nzoia Sugar (A), 11 Dec 2021, both 2021-22 KPL

The 2021-22 season was Kariobangi Sharks sixth straight in the Kenyan Premier League following their promotion from the National Super League at the end of the year 2016. It was Kariobangi Shark's fourth season in the newly aligned Football Kenya Federation Premier League calendar following the federation's transition from a single-year season to the European-style football calendar in conformity with a CAF directive.

The 2021–22 season began on 25 September 2021 and concluded on 22 August 2021 with Sharks starting boldly with a 1-0 away win over Posta Rangers. It concluded on 12 June 2022 with an away game to Kakamega Homeboyz that Sharks gave a wide berth.

The team ended the league placed tenth with 45 points after registering 12 wins, two less than last season, nine draws and 13 losses.

This is a season that saw the exit of talisman Erick Kapaito who topped scored for the club in the 2018, as well as for club and the league in the 2018-19, and 2020-21 seasons exit to the club to join Ethiopian side Arba Minch FC. Right back Daniel Sakari and goalkeeper Brian Bwire also left to join Tusker FC.

The three departures were part of eleven exits that also saw returnee Ibrahim Kitawi, defender John Kuol, midfielder Shaphan Oyugi and forward Peter Lwasa move on from the club. To fill the void, forwards Felix Oluoch and flyer Enock Wanyama joined from APS Bomet and Ligi Ndogo SC, respectively, alongside attacking midfielder Steven Otieno and returning striker Henry Juma, both from Kisumu All Stars. Oluoch went on to become the club's top scorer at season end after scoring 12 league goals.

There was no domestic cup played in the 2021-22 season as football in the country was overseen by an FKF Caretaker Committee following the disbandment of the Football Kenya Federation in November of 2021.

== Technical Bench ==
Position	Staff
Head coach	(Kenya) William Muluya
Assistant head coach	(Kenya) Ezekiel Seda
Team Manager	(Kenya) Mathew Sam
Goalkeeper Trainer	(Kenya) Francis Dick
Head of Medical/Physio	(Kenya) John Kemboi
Kit Manager	(Kenya) Paul Otieno

Source: Soka

== Transfers ==
The primary transfer window for the 2021–22 Kenyan Premier League season was between 1-20 October 2021 but was extended to 1 November. The mid transfer window lasted between 1-28 February 2022.

=== In ===
Date	Pos.	Player	From	Ref.
27 Aug 2021	FW	(Kenya) Enock Wanyama	(Kenya) Ligi Ndogo	
27 Aug 2021	ST	(Kenya) Ryan Ashiono	(Kenya) Kakamega Homeboyz	
27 Aug 2021	CM	(Kenya) Ken Kyalo	(Kenya) St. Anthony's Boys School	
27 Aug 2021	AM	(Kenya) Isaac Otieno	(Kenya) Sharks Youth FC	
9 Sep 2021	AM	(Kenya) Fortune Omoto	(Kenya) Nairobi Stima	
10 Sep 2021	AM	(Kenya) Steven Otieno	(Kenya) Kisumu All Stars	
10 Sep 2021	ST	(Kenya) Henry Juma	(Kenya) Kisumu All Stars	
11 Sep 2021	LW	(Kenya) Geoffrey Onyango	(Kenya) Sharks Youth FC	
21 Sep 2021	AM	(Kenya) Keith Imbali	(Kenya) Coast Stima	
22 Sep 2021	ST	(Kenya) Felix Oluoch	(Kenya) APS Bomet	
24 Sep 2021	ST	(Kenya) Eric Mmata	Mt. Kenya United	

=== Out ===
Date	Pos.	Player	To	Ref.
7 Sep 2021	RB	(Kenya) Daniel Sakari	(Kenya) Tusker FC	
7 Sep 2021	GK	(Kenya) Brian Bwire	(Kenya) Tusker FC	
8 Sep 2021	FW	(Kenya) James Mazembe	(Kenya) KCB	
21 Sep 2021	ST	(Kenya) Erick Kapaito	(Ethiopia) Arba Minch	
22 Sep 2021	CB	(Kenya) Joshua Onyango	(Kenya) Gor Mahia	
22 Sep 2021	AM	(Uganda) Peter Lwasa	(Kenya) Gor Mahia	
22 Sep 2021	DM	(Kenya) Peter Oudu	(Kenya) Gor Mahia	
22 Sep 2021	LB	(Kenya) Boniface Mwangemi	(Kenya) Bandari	
31 Sep 2021	DM	(Kenya) Shaphan Oyugi	(Tanzania) Biashara United	
1 Nov 2021	CB	(South Sudan) John Kuol	(Kenya) Wazito FC	
	FW	(Kenya) Ibrahim Kitawi	Free Agents	
	CM	(Kenya) Ibrahim Ochieng	Free Agents	
	ST	(Kenya) Robert Onyango	Free Agents	

=== In ===
Date	Pos.	Player	From	Ref.
27 Jan 2022	CB	(Uganda) Ziyadi Kiwanuka	(Kenya) FC Talanta	
1 Apr 2022	DM	(Kenya) Issa Lumumba	(Kenya) St. Anthony’s Boys High	

=== Out ===
Date	Pos.	Player	To	Ref.
22 Jan 2022	ST	(Kenya) Sydney Lokale	(Kenya) KCB	
22 Jan 2022	CB	(Kenya) Geoffrey Shiveka	(Kenya) Posta Rangers	
22 Jan 2022	RB	(Kenya) Eric Juma	Kenya Police FC	

== Competitions ==
=== Overall record ===
Competition	First match	Last match	Starting round	Final position	Record							
Competition	First match	Last match	Starting round	Final position	Pld	W	D	L	GF	GA	GD	Win %
2021-22 KPL	25 Sep 2021	12 Jun 2022	Matchday 1	10th	34	12	9	13	44	39	+5	35.29
Total					34	12	9	13	44	39	+5	35.29

Source: Soccerway

=== Kenyan Premier League ===
==== Results summary ====
Overall								Home						Away					
Pld	W	D	L	GF	GA	GD	Pts	W	D	L	GF	GA	GD	W	D	L	GF	GA	GD
34	12	9	13	44	39	+5	45	5	4	8	23	24	−1	7	5	5	21	15	+6

Source: Soccerway
