= 2024–25 Kariobangi Sharks FC season =

Kenyan football club season

Kariobangi Sharks
2024-25 KPL season
- Owner: Nick Mwendwa
- Chairman: Robert Maoga
- Head coach: William Muluya
- Stadium: Utalii grounds
- Kenyan Premier League: 11th
- 2024-25 Mozzart Cup: Qtrs
- Top goalscorer: League: Ally Salum, (5); All: Ally Salum, (9)
- Biggest win: 6-0 vs Spitfire (A), 22 Feb 2025, 2024-25 Mozzart Cup
- Biggest defeat: 3-1 vs Gor Mahia (H), 5 Mar 2025, 2024-25 KPL

The 2024-25 season was Kariobangi Sharks ninth straight in the Kenyan Premier League following their promotion from the National Super League at the end of the year 2016.

For the second time in three seasons, Sharks ended up in eleventh spot in the 18-team league, with 40 points, eight short of the 48 that handed them a seventh place finish in the 2023-24 season.

For only the second time in their nine seasons in the Kenyan top flight, the team failed to score 40+ goals, besides the corona-virus affected 2019-20 season which ended prematurely. This time round the team scored sub 30 goals, with Tanzanian forward Ally Salum top scoring with five league goals and topped up with another four in the domestic cup to becoming the first non-Kenyan to emerge as the outright best in goals at the club. He took over from last seasons top scorer John Mark Makwatta who left at the club prior to the start of the new season.

For the ninth time in the last ten seasons, Sharks made it to the quarterfinals of the domestic cup, but as was the case in the 2021-22 season, lost out to Gor Mahia 2-0 to miss out on a place in the last four.

== Technical Bench ==
Position	Staff
Head coach	(Kenya) William Muluya
Assistant head coach	(Kenya) Ezekiel Seda
Team Manager	(Kenya) Mathew Sam
Goalkeeper Trainer	(Kenya) Sammy Okinda
Head of Medical/Physio	(Kenya) John Kemboi
Strength & Conditioning Coach	(Kenya) Whyvonne Isuza
Kit Manager	(Kenya) Paul Otieno

Source: Soka

== Transfers ==
The primary transfer window for the 2024-25 season opened was between 1 July - 9 September 2024 while the mid transfer window lasted between 31 January and 28 February 2025.

=== In ===
Date	Pos.	Player	From	Ref.
23 Aug 2024	ST	(Tanzania) Ally Salum	(Kenya) Rainbow FC	
23 Aug 2024	AM	(South Sudan) Paul Jawa	(Kenya) Rainbow FC	
23 Aug 2024	CM	(South Sudan) Jacob Otieno	(Kenya) Rainbow FC	
23 Aug 2024	GK	(Kenya) Brian Odhiambo	(Kenya) Vihiga Bullets	
23 Aug 2024	LB	(Kenya) Zablon Kutela	(Kenya) Sharks Youth	
23 Aug 2024	ST	(Kenya) Evans Ochieng	(Kenya) Sharks Youth	
23 Aug 2024	AM	(Kenya) Humphrey Aroko	(Kenya) Sharks Youth	
23 Aug 2024	CM	(Kenya) Tonny Gogah	(Kenya) Winam Soccer Stars	

=== Out ===
Date	Pos.	Player	To	Ref.
23 Aug 2024	FW	(Kenya) Julius Masaba	(Kenya) AFC Leopards	
23 Aug 2024	WB	(Kenya) Geoffrey Onyango	Kenya Police FC	
23 Aug 2024	GK	(Kenya) Kevin Ouru	(Kenya) Posta Rangers	
23 Aug 2024	AM	(Kenya) Stanley Wilson	(Sweden) AIK Fotboll	
23 Aug 2024	ST	(Kenya) John Mark Makwatta	(Tanzania) Coastal Union	
23 Aug 2024	DF	(South Sudan) David Jima	Free agent	
23 Aug 2024	DF	(Kenya) Kevin Musamali	(Kenya) Bidco United (loan)	

=== In ===
Date	Pos.	Player	From	Ref.
2 Feb 2025	AM	(Kenya) Price Musebe	(Kenya) Kenyatta University	
2 Feb 2025	ST	(Kenya) Francis Memusi	(Kenya) Laiser Hill Academy	
2 Feb 2025	FW	(Kenya) Keegan Ndemi	(Kenya) Bandari	
28 Feb 2025	DF	(Kenya) Faiz Opande	(United States) Nashville SC	

=== Out ===
Date	Pos.	Player	To	Ref.
6 Feb 2025	CM	(Kenya) Keith Imbali	(Kenya) Shabana FC	
12 Feb 2025	FW	(South Sudan) Paul Jawa	(France) FC Fleury 91	
12 Feb 2025	RB	(Kenya) Fredrick Alushula	(Kenya) AFC Leopards	

== Competitions ==
=== Overall record ===
Competition	First match	Last match	Starting round	Final position	Record							
Competition	First match	Last match	Starting round	Final position	Pld	W	D	L	GF	GA	GD	Win %
2024-25 KPL	24 Aug 2024	22 Jun 2025	Matchday 1	11th	34	8	16	10	29	29	+0	23.53
2024-25 Mozzart Bet Cup	22 Feb 2025	29 Jun 2025	Round of 32	Qtrs	4	3	0	1	10	3	+7	75.00
Total					38	11	16	11	39	32	+7	28.95

Source: Soccerway

=== Kenyan Premier League ===
==== Results summary ====
Overall								Home						Away					
Pld	W	D	L	GF	GA	GD	Pts	W	D	L	GF	GA	GD	W	D	L	GF	GA	GD
34	8	16	10	29	29	0	40	6	6	5	26	22	+4	2	10	5	3	7	−4

Source: Soccerway

==== Results by round ====
Round	1	2	3	4	5	6	7	8	9	10	11	12	13	14	15	16	17	18	19	20	21	22	23	24	25	26	27	28	29	30	31	32	33	34
Ground	A	H	H	A	H	A	H	A	H	A	H	A	H	A	A	H	A	H	A	A	H	A	H	H	A	H	A	A	H	H	A	H	A	H
Result	D	W	W	W	D	L	D	D	D	L	L	W	D	L	L	L	D	D	D	D	D	D	L	W	D	W	D	L	L	D	W	L	D	W
Position	9	2	2	2	2	2	2	3	3	5	8	5	6	10	12	13	11	13	13	13	12	13	14	12	12	11	11	12	12	12	12	12	11	11
Points	1	4	7	10	11	11	12	13	14	14	14	17	18	18	18	18	19	20	21	22	23	24	24	27	28	31	32	32	32	33	36	36	37	40

Source: Soccerway
A = Away; H = Home; W = Win; D = Draw; L = Loss; P = Postponed

==== Score overview ====
Win Draw Loss

Opposition	Home score	Away score	Aggregate score	Double
AFC Leopards	1-1	0-0	1-1	No
Bandari	1-2	0-2	1-2	No
Bidco Utd	1-1	0-1	4-1	No
Gor Mahia	1-3	0-1	1-4	No
Kakamega Homeboyz	0-2	1-0	1-2	No
KCB	1-0	0-0	1-0	No
Kenya Police	0-0	0-1	0-1	No
Mara Sugar	4-1	0-1	4-2	No
Mathare United	3-1	0-0	3-1	No
Murang'a Seal	3-0	0-0	3-0	No
Nairobi City Stars	2-2	0-0	2-2	No
Posta Rangers	2-2	1-0	3-2	No
Shabana	1-1	0-0	1-1	No
Sofapaka	1-2	0-0	1-2	No
Talanta	2-1	1-1	3-2	No
Tusker	3-2	0-0	3-2	No
Ulinzi Stars	0-1	0-0	0-1	No

==== Matches ====
Win Draw Loss Fixtures

The 2024-25 Kenyan Premier League season began on 24 Aug 2024 and ended on 22 Jun 2025.

24 August 2024 1	KCB	0-0	Kariobangi Sharks	Nairobi
15:00 UTC+3		Report

14 September 2024 2	Kariobangi Sharks	3-2	Tusker FC	Nairobi
15:00 UTC+3	Imbali 68'; Salum 82', 90+4'	Report	Ogam 6'; Momanyi 28'	Stadium: Dandora Stadium

22 September 2024 3	Kariobangi Sharks	3-0	Muranga SEAL	Nairobi
15:00 UTC+3	Salum 30'; Imbali 71'; Andres 78'	Report		Stadium: Dandora Stadium

30 September 2024 4	Kakamega Homeboyz	0-1	Kariobangi Sharks	Kakamega
15:00 UTC+3		Report	Salum 46'	Stadium: Bukhungu Stadium

20 October 2024 5	Kariobangi Sharks	1-1	AFC Leopards	Nairobi
15:00 UTC+3	Alushula 20' (yellow card) 49' (yellow-red card) 72'	Report	Omune 25'

23 October 2024 6	Bidco United	1-0	Kariobangi Sharks	Nairobi
15:00 UTC+3	Agofa 90+3'	Report

26 October 2024 7	Kariobangi Sharks	1-1	Shabana FC	Nairobi
15:00 UTC+3	Imbali 64' (pen.)	Report	Michira 57'

2 November 2024 8	FC Talanta	1-1	Kariobangi Sharks	Nairobi
15:00 UTC+3	Kipruto 21'	Report	Ngume 60'

27 November 2024 10	Bandari	2-0	Kariobangi Sharks	Mombasa
15:00 UTC+3	Karani 31' (o.g.); Nyamawi 54'	Report		Stadium: KPA Mbaraki

1 December 2024 11	Kariobangi Sharks	1-2	Sofapaka FC	Nairobi
15:00 UTC+3	Alushula 48'	Report	Okello 35'; Kuloba 45+2'	Stadium: Kasarani Annex

8 December 2024 12	Posta Rangers	0-1	Kariobangi Sharks	Nairobi
15:00 UTC+3		Report	Jawa 22'

11 December 2024 13	Kariobangi Sharks	2-2	Nairobi City Stars	Nairobi
15:00 UTC+3	Panchol 43' (pen.); Andres 49'	Report	Bajaber 14'; Mzee 61'	Stadium: Dandora Stadium

14 December 2024 14	Mara Sugar FC	1-0	Kariobangi Sharks	Awendo
15:00 UTC+3	Juma 70'	Report		Stadium: Green Stadium

22 December 2024 15	Gor Mahia	1-0	Kariobangi Sharks	Nairobi
15:00 UTC+3	Bendeka 24'	Report		Stadium: Kasarani Stadium

12 January 2025 17	Mathare United	0-0	Kariobangi Sharks	Nairobi
15:00 UTC+3		Report		Stadium: Kasarani Stadium

18 January 2025 16	Kariobangi Sharks	0-1	Ulinzi Stars	Nairobi
15:00 UTC+3		Report	Omondi 78'	Stadium: Kasarani Stadium

26 January 2025 18	Kariobangi Sharks	1-1	Bidco United	Nairobi
15:00 UTC+3	Andres 12'	Report	Yobo 70'	Stadium: Kasarani Annex

2 February 2025 19	Shabana FC	0-0	Kariobangi Sharks	Kisii
15:00 UTC+3		Report		Stadium: Gusii Stadium

9 February 2025 20	AFC Leopards	0-0	Kariobangi Sharks	Nairobi
15:00 UTC+3		Report

14 February 2025 21	Kariobangi Sharks	2-2	Posta Rangers	Nairobi
15:00 UTC+3	Salum 9'; Lokuwam 69' (o.g.)	Report	Oluoch 27', 72'	Stadium: Kasarani Annex

19 February 2025 22	Ulinzi Stars	0-0	Kariobangi Sharks	Nairobi
15:00 UTC+3		Report		Stadium: Ulinzi Complex

5 March 2025 23	Kariobangi Sharks	1-3	Gor Mahia	Nairobi
15:00 UTC+3	Omoto 26'	Report	Alpha 45+1'; Austin 51', 55' (pen.)	Stadium: Kasarani Stadium

15 March 2025 24	Kariobangi Sharks	3-1	Mathare United	Nairobi
15:00 UTC+3	Mbulere 22'; Panchol 32' (pen.); Aroko 90'	Report	Asieche 6' (pen.)	Stadium: Kasarani Stadium

29 March 2025 25	Nairobi City Stars	0-0	Kariobangi Sharks	Machakos
15:00 UTC+3		Report		Stadium: Kenyatta Stadium

6 April 2025 26	Kariobangi Sharks	2-1	FC Talanta	Nairobi
15:00 UTC+3	Ngume 25'; Wakachala 83'	Report	Osoro 45'

20 April 2025 27	Muranga SEAL	0-0	Kariobangi Sharks	Muranga
15:00 UTC+3		Report		Stadium: SportPesa Arena

26 April 2025 28	Kariobangi Sharks	1-2	Bandari	Nairobi
15:00 UTC+3	Mbulere 9'; Muluya (Coach) (red card) 43'	Report	Makwatta 9'; Nyamawi 74'; Origa (red card) 90+7'	Stadium: Kasarani Stadium

4 May 2025 29	Kenya Police FC	1-0	Kariobangi Sharks	Nairobi
15:00 UTC+3	Nabwire 50'	Report		Stadium: Police Sacco

10 May 2025 30	Sofapaka FC	0-0	Kariobangi Sharks	Nairobi
15:00 UTC+3		Report		Stadium: Dandora Stadium

15 May 2025 31	Kariobangi Sharks	1-0	KCB	Nairobi
15:00 UTC+3	Aroko 69'	Report		Stadium: Kasarani Stadium

18 May 2025 32	Kariobangi Sharks	0-2	Kakamega Homeboyz	Nairobi
15:00 UTC+3		Report	Esiye 75'; Shumah 90'	Stadium: Kasarani Stadium

15 June 2025 32	Tusker FC	0-0	Kariobangi Sharks	Nairobi
15:00 UTC+3		Report

22 June 2025 34	Kariobangi Sharks	4-1	Mara Sugar FC	Nairobi
15:00 UTC+3	Omollo 11'; Otieno 18'; Odhiambo 54'; Wasambo 90+5'	Report	Ngiela 76'	Stadium: Kasarani Annex

=== Mozzart Bet Cup ===
Win Draw Loss Fixtures

22 Feb 2025 Round of 64	Spitfire FC	0-6	Kariobangi Sharks	Nairobi
15:00 UTC+3		Report	Salum 19', 45'; Otieno 39'; Musebe 80'; Memusi 81', 87'	Stadium: Dandora Stadium

8 Mar 2025 Round of 32	Kariobangi Sharks	1-0	Zetech Titans	Nairobi
15:00 UTC+3	Salum 85'			Stadium: Kasarani Annex

12 Apr 2025 Round of 16	Denmak FC	1-3	Kariobangi Sharks	Mombasa
15:00 UTC+3	Ngurumo 10'		Biko 53'; Panchol 85'; Salum 90+5'	Stadium: Mbaraki Grounds

1 May 2025 Qtrs	Gor Mahia	2-0	Kariobangi Sharks	Nairobi
15:00 UTC+3	Essombe 16'; Alpha 83'	Report		Stadium: Dandora Stadium

== Statistics ==
=== Goalscorers ===
No.	Pos.	Player	Premier League	Mozzart Cup	Total
9	ST	(Tanzania) Ally Salum	5	4	9
8	AM	(Kenya) Andres Odhiambo	4	0	4
2	CB	(South Sudan) Ghai Panchol	2	1	3
7	FW	(Kenya) Victor Ngume	3	0	3
23	CM	(Kenya) Keith Imbali	3	0	3
3	RB	(Kenya) Fredrick Alushula	2	0	2
13	ST	(Kenya) Francis Memusi	0	2	2
18	AM	(Kenya) Humphrey Aroko	2	0	2
19	FW	(Kenya) Stephen Mbulere	2	0	2
21	FW	(Kenya) Leonlevitt Otieno	1	1	2
4	AM	(Kenya) Price Musebe	0	1	1
6	CB	(Kenya) Biko Omollo	0	1	1
10	AM	(Kenya) Fortune Omoto	1	0	1
11	FW	(South Sudan) Paul Jawa	1	0	1
23	FW	(Kenya) Frankline Omollo	1	0	1
49	ST	(Kenya) Jahson Wakachala	1	0	1
Own goals			0	0	0
Missing			1	0	1
Totals			29	10	39

== Awards ==
No.	Pos.	Player	Award	Ref
14	CB	(Kenya) Timothy Ekhavi	Players' Player of the Year	
