= 2025–26 Kenyan Premier League =

Kenyan Premier League
- Season: 2025–26
- Dates: 20 September 2025 – 30 May 2026
- Champions: Gor Mahia
- Relegated: Kariobangi Sharks; Bidco United; Sofapaka
- Champions League: Gor Mahia
- Confederation Cup: Tusker
- Matches: 260
- Goals: 560 (2.15 per match)
- Top goalscorer: Joe Waithera (Murang'a SEAL) (19 goals)

The 2025–26 Kenyan Premier League(known as the SportPesa Premier League for sponsorship reasons) was the 63rd season of top-division football in Kenya since 1963, and the 23th season of the Kenyan Premier League, the top-tier football league in Kenya, since it began in 2003. The season started on 20 September 2025 and ended on 30 May 2026.

== Teams ==
The league consisted of 18 teams; the top 16 teams from the previous season, and two teams promoted from the National Super League. Kenya Police entered the season as defending champions (for the First time).

=== Changes from previous season ===
==== Promotion and relegation ====
▲ Promoted from 2024–25 National Super League	▼ Relegated to 2025–26 National Super League
APS Bomet; Nairobi United	Nairobi City Stars; Talanta

=== Stadiums and locations ===
Location of 2025-26 Kenyan Premier League teams

Team	Coach	Location	Stadium	Capacity
A.F.C. Leopards	(Kenya) Fred Ambani	Nairobi	Nyayo Stadium	18,000
APS Bomet	(Kenya) Sammy Omollo	Bomet	Green Stadium, Kericho	5,000
Bandari	(Kenya) Bernard Mwalala	Mombasa	Mbaraki Sports Club	5,000
Bidco United F.C.	(Kenya) Anthony Akhulia	Thika	Thika Municipal Stadium	20,000
Gor Mahia	(Ghana) Charles Akonnor	Nairobi	MISC Kasarani	5,000
Kakamega Homeboyz	(Kenya) Patrick Odhiambo	Kakamega	Bukhungu Stadium	5,000
Kariobangi Sharks	(Kenya) William Muluya	Nairobi	Dandora Stadium	5,000
Kenya Commercial Bank	(Kenya) Robert Matano	Nairobi	SportPesa Arena	5,000
Kenya Police F.C.	(Kenya) Nicholas Muyoti	Nairobi	Police Sacco Stadium	3,000
Mara Sugar	(Kenya) Edward Manoah	Sare-Awendo	Awendo Green Stadium	5,000
Mathare United	(Kenya) John Kamau	Nairobi	Dandora Stadium	4,000
Murang'a Seal	(Kenya) Osborne Monday	Murang'a	SportPesa Arena	5,000
Nairobi United	(Kenya) Godfrey Oduor	Nairobi	Kasarani Annex	5,000
Posta Rangers	(Kenya) Collins Omondi (interim)	Nairobi	Kenyatta Stadium	5,000
Shabana	(Kenya) Peter Okidi	Kisii	Gusii Stadium	12,000
Sofapaka	(Kenya) Ezekiel Akwana	Nairobi	Kenyatta Stadium	5,000
Tusker	(France) Julien Mette	Nairobi	Kenyatta Stadium	5,000
Ulinzi Stars	(Kenya) Stephen Ochola	Nairobi	Ulinzi Sports Complex	8,200

== League table ==
Pos	Team	Pld	W	D	L	GF	GA	GD	Pts	Qualification or relegation
1	Gor Mahia (C, Q)	34	20	9	5	50	22	+28	69	Qualification to 2026–27 CAF Champions League
2	AFC Leopards	34	19	7	8	44	28	+16	64	
3	Kenya Police	34	13	16	5	31	21	+10	55	
4	Nairobi United	34	14	11	9	44	34	+10	53	
5	Shabana	34	14	10	10	35	34	+1	52	
6	Kakamega Homeboyz	34	12	13	9	47	37	+10	49	
7	KCB	34	13	9	12	36	37	−1	48	
8	Murang'a SEAL	34	13	8	13	42	41	+1	47	
9	Tusker	34	13	6	15	27	32	−5	45	
10	APS Bomet	34	11	11	12	37	35	+2	44	
11	Mara Sugar	34	10	14	10	30	30	0	44	
12	Bandari	34	9	17	8	26	26	0	44	
13	Ulinzi Stars	34	11	8	15	34	37	−3	41	
14	Mathare United	34	11	8	15	31	35	−4	41	
15	Posta Rangers	34	9	13	12	31	40	−9	40	
16	Kariobangi Sharks (R)	34	8	14	12	30	33	−3	38	Qualification for the Kenyan Premier League play-off
17	Bidco United (R)	34	5	12	17	19	40	−21	27	Relegation to 2026–27 Kenyan National Super League
18	Sofapaka (R)	34	3	10	21	19	51	−32	19	Relegation to 2026–27 Kenyan National Super League

Source: Football Kenya Federation Soccerway, ESPN, Sofascore
Rules for classification: 1) Points; 2) Goal difference; 3) Number of goals scored; 4) Head-to-head results; 5) Wins; 6) Away goals;
(C) Champions; (Q) Qualified for the phase indicated; (R) Relegated

== Season statistics ==
=== Top goalscorers ===
Rank	Player	Team	Goals
1	(Kenya) Joe Waithera	Murang'a SEAL	19
2	(Kenya) Paul Okoth	Ulinzi Stars	17
3	(Kenya) Humphrey Aroko	Kariobangi Sharks	12
4	(Kenya) Michael Karamor	Nairobi United	10
4	(Kenya) Phillip Wasai	APS Bomet	10
6	(Mali) Yves Koutiama	Kenya Police	9
6	(Kenya) Oliver Machaka	Kakamega Homeboyz	9
8	(Uganda) Samuel Ssenyonjo	AFC Leopards	7
8	(Kenya) Brian Michira	Shabana	7
8	(Kenya) Jackson Irungu	Posta Rangers	7
8	(Kenya) Erick Kapaito	Tusker	7
8	(Kenya) Felix Oluoch	Gor Mahia	7
8	(Ghana) Ebenezer Assifuah	Gor Mahia	7

== Attendances ==
The top 10 best-attended games in the 2025–26 season are listed below:

#	Match	Date	Attendance
1	Gor Mahia vs AFC Leopards	30 November 2025	23,372
2	Gor Mahia vs Nairobi United	31 May 2026	18,170
3	Shabana FC vs Gor Mahia	11 January 2026	10,525
4	Shabana FC vs Posta Rangers	15 October 2025	9,370
5	Gor Mahia vs Shabana FC	21 March 2026	8,137
6	Gor Mahia vs Kenya Police FC	10 May 2026	7,963
7	Shabana FC vs APS Bomet	21 September 2025	7,645
8	Shabana FC vs Mathare United	26 October 2025	5,985
9	Shabana FC vs Tusker FC	21 February 2026	5,932
10	AFC Leopards vs Murang'a SEAL	8 November 2025	5,730
