= 2022–23 Kenyan Premier League =

Kenyan Premier League
- Season: 2022–23
- Dates: 19 November 2022 – 25 June 2023
- Champions: Gor Mahia (20th title)
- Relegated: Mathare United; Vihiga Bullets
- CAF Champions League: Gor Mahia
- CAF Confederation Cup: Kakamega Homeboyz
- Matches: 306
- Goals: 651 (2.13 per match)
- Top goalscorer: (Kenya) Elvis Rupia (27 goals)
- All statistics correct as of complete.

The 2022–23 Kenyan Premier League was the 20th season of the Kenyan Premier League since it began in 2003, and the 60th season of top-division football in Kenya since 1963. The season was set to commence on 24 September, however, an ongoing technical dispute with FIFA pushed the start to 19 November 2022.

== Team changes ==
APS Bomet and Fortune SACCO gained promotion to the Premier League from the 2021–22 National Super League, with Mathare United and Vihiga United being relegated. However, the FKF announced on 9 November 2020 that the results of the 2021–22 Premier League were abandoned due to an ongoing technical dispute with FIFA, and the promotion/relegation from the previous season were canceled.

== Stadiums ==
Locations of the 2022–23 teams

Team	Location	Stadium	Capacity
AFC Leopards	Nairobi	Nyayo Stadium	30,000
Bandari	Mombasa	Mombasa Municipal Stadium	10,000
Bidco United	Thika	Del Monte Grounds Stadium	20,000
Gor Mahia	Nairobi	City Stadium	15,000
Kakamega Homeboyz	Kakamega	Bukhungu Stadium	5,000
Kariobangi Sharks	Machakos	Kenyatta Stadium	5,000
KCB	Nairobi	City Stadium	15,000
Kenya Police	Nairobi	Nyayo National Stadium	30,000
Mathare United	Nairobi	MISC Kasarani	60,000
Nairobi City Stars	Nairobi	Hope Centre	5,000
Nzoia Sugar	Bungoma	Kanduyi Stadium	5,000
Posta Rangers	Eldoret	Kipchoge Keino Stadium	10,000
Sofapaka	Machakos	Kenyatta Stadium	5,000
Talanta	Nairobi	Ruaraka Stadium	4,000
Tusker	Nairobi	Ruaraka Stadium	4,000
Ulinzi Stars	Nakuru	Afraha Stadium	8,200
Vihiga Bullets	Kakamega	Bukhungu Stadium	5,000
Wazito	Machakos	Kenyatta Stadium	5,000

== Personnel and sponsoring ==
Team	Manager	Kit Manufacturer	Sponsor
AFC Leopards	(Belgium) Patrick Aussems		
Bandari	(Kenya) Twahir Muhiddin		
Bidco	(Kenya) Anthony Akhulia		
Gor Mahia	(Northern Ireland) Johnathan McKinstry		
Kakamega Homeboyz	(Kenya) Patrick Odhiambo		
Kariobangi Sharks	(Kenya) William Muluya		
KCB	(Kenya) Zedekiah Otieno		
Kenya Police	(Kenya) Francis Baraza		
Mathare United	(Kenya) Collins Omondi		
Nairobi City Stars	(Kenya) Nicholas Muyoti		
Nzoia Sugar	(Kenya) Salim Babu		
Posta Rangers	(Kenya) Salim Ali		
Sofapaka	(Kenya) David Odhiambo		
Talanta	(Kenya) Ken Kenyatta		
Tusker	(Kenya) Robert Matano		
Ulinzi	(Kenya) Bernard Mwalala		
Vihiga United	(Kenya) Sammy Okoth		
Wazito	(Kenya) Charles Odero		

== League table ==
Pos	Team	Pld	W	D	L	GF	GA	GD	Pts	Promotion, qualification or relegation
1	Gor Mahia (C)	34	20	10	4	53	22	+31	70	Qualification to CAF Champions League qualifying first round
2	Tusker	34	20	9	5	45	23	+22	69	
3	Kenya Police	34	18	10	6	57	22	+35	64	
4	Nzoia Sugar	34	18	10	6	43	23	+20	64	
5	Kenya Commercial Bank	34	18	10	6	37	19	+18	64	
6	Bandari	34	18	6	10	44	27	+17	60	
7	AFC Leopards	34	14	9	11	32	25	+7	51	
8	Kakamega Homeboyz	34	13	10	11	35	27	+8	49	Qualification for Confederation Cup (Note: Kakamega Homeboyz qualified for the CAF Confederation Cup by winning the 2023 FKF President's Cup.)
9	Ulinzi	34	12	13	9	35	34	+1	49	
10	Sofapaka	34	10	12	12	32	37	−5	42	
11	Kariobangi Sharks	34	10	11	13	46	46	0	41	
12	Posta Rangers	34	10	10	14	33	41	−8	40	
13	Bidco	34	9	9	16	37	36	+1	36	
14	FC Talanta	34	8	12	14	35	50	−15	36	
15	Nairobi City Stars	34	8	10	16	37	49	−12	34	
16	Wazito (O)	34	7	8	19	22	50	−28	29	Qualification for Relegation Play-Offs
17	Mathare United (R)	34	8	2	24	26	62	−36	26	Relegation to Kenyan National Super League
18	Vihiga Bullets (R)	34	3	3	28	28	86	−58	12	Relegation to Kenyan National Super League

Source: FKF Premier League 2022
Rules for classification: 1) Points; 2) Goal difference; 3) Number of goals scored; 4) Head-to-head results; 5) Wins; 6) Away goals; 7) Penalty points (sec 9.5); 8) 12-point sending off offences
(C) Champions; (O) Play-off winners; (R) Relegated

== Results ==
Home \ Away	AFC	BAN	BID	GOR	KKH	KAR	KCB	KEP	MAT	NAI	NZO	POS	SOF	TAL	TUS	ULI	VIB	WAZ
AFC Leopards	—	1–0	1–4	0–0	0–0	0–0	2–2	1–0	2–1	1–2	1–0	0–1	1–2	0–0	0–1	0–1	1–0	1–0
Bandari	0–2	—	2–0	1–2	1–0	1–0	0–1	0–3	3–0	2–1	1–0	1–3	2–1	1–1	2–1	5–0	7–2	1–0
Bidco United	1–1	0–1	—	1–2	1–1	1–2	1–2	0–1	1–3	0–0	0–1	2–1	2–0	0–1	0–1	3–0	3–3	0–1
Gor Mahia	1–2	1–0	1–0	—	2–3	2–0	0–1	2–1	2–1	1–0	1–0	2–2	0–0	3–0	2–1	2–0	5–0	4–0
Kakamega Homeboyz	2–0	0–1	1–1	0–1	—	1–1	0–0	0–1	1–0	0–0	0–2	0–1	1–1	4–2	1–2	1–1	1–0	1–0
Kariobangi Sharks	0–1	1–0	1–1	1–1	1–3	—	2–1	1–2	1–2	1–2	1–3	0–0	2–0	2–2	0–1	3–2	3–3	2–2
KCB	0–1	0–0	1–0	0–0	0–1	2–1	—	2–2	2–1	1–0	1–2	1–1	0–0	1–0	1–2	0–0	3–0	2–0
Kenya Police	0–0	0–0	2–0	0–1	0–1	3–2	0–1	—	1–0	4–2	2–0	3–1	3–0	1–1	3–0	0–0	4–1	4–0
Mathare United	1–0	0–1	0–3	2–1	1–5	1–2	0–1	0–5	—	0–1	1–2	0–2	0–4	3–2	0–2	1–1	1–0	1–0
Nairobi City Stars	0–1	1–1	0–2	1–4	0–0	1–1	0–1	1–2	3–0	—	2–3	2–3	1–1	1–2	0–0	0–2	5–2	1–0
Nzoia Sugar	0–0	0–0	0–0	2–2	1–1	0–1	0–2	2–2	3–0	1–0	—	1–1	1–0	1–0	1–0	1–0	2–1	4–0
Posta Rangers	0–1	1–2	1–0	0–2	0–2	1–5	0–1	0–2	1–1	0–0	2–3	—	1–2	1–1	0–1	1–0	2–1	1–1
Sofapaka	1–1	0–2	0–3	0–0	3–1	1–0	0–1	1–1	1–0	1–2	0–0	0–0	—	1–0	0–1	2–2	2–0	2–3
Talanta	0–6	0–1	1–2	1–2	1–0	2–2	1–2	0–0	3–2	2–2	0–0	0–2	1–1	—	1–1	0–3	2–1	2–0
Tusker	1–0	1–0	3–1	0–0	1–0	1–1	1–0	1–0	2–1	4–1	0–0	1–1	2–0	2–2	—	0–0	2–1	2–0
Ulinzi Stars	0–2	2–1	1–1	1–1	1–0	1–0	0–0	1–1	3–1	1–1	1–2	1–0	1–1	2–0	2–2	—	3–1	1–0
Vihiga Bullets	2–1	0–2	0–3	1–3	0–2	1–3	0–3	0–4	1–0	4–2	0–2	0–1	2–3	0–1	0–4	0–1	—	1–3
Wazito	2–1	2–2	0–0	0–0	0–1	1–3	1–1	0–0	0–1	1–2	0–3	2–1	0–1	0–3	2–1	1–0	0–0	—

Source: Soccerway
Legend: Blue = home team win; Yellow = draw; Red = away team win.
For upcoming matches, an "a" indicates there is an article about the rivalry between the two participants.

== Season statistics ==
=== Top scorers ===
Rank	Player	Club	Goals
1	(Kenya) Elvis Rupia	Kenya Police	27
2	(Kenya) Benson Omala	Gor Mahia	25
3	(Kenya) Hassan Abdallah	Bandari	12
3	(Uganda) Umar Kasumba	Bandari	12
5	(Kenya) Joseph Mwangi	Nzoia Sugar	11
6	(Kenya) Hillary Simiyu	Ulinzi Stars	10
7	(Kenya) Tyson Otieno	Kariobangi Sharks	9
7	(Kenya) Kennedy Owino	KCB	9
9	(Morocco) Roddy Manga	Sofapaka	8
9	(Kenya) Austine Odhiambo	Gor Mahia	8
9	(Kenya) Moses Shikanda	Kariobangi Sharks	8

=== Hat-tricks ===
Player	For	Against	Score	Date
(Uganda) Ojok Deogracious	Tusker	Nairobi City	4-1	27 November 2022
(Kenya) Michael Karamor	Kakamega	Talanta	4-2	17 December 2022
(Kenya) Vincent Ogolla	Vihiga	Nairobi City	4-2	8 January 2023
(Kenya) Brian Yakhama	Talanta	Mathare United	3-2	14 January 2023
(Kenya) John Mwangi	Nzoia Sugar	Wazito	4-0	18 January 2023
(Kenya) Benson Omala	Gor Mahia	Vihiga	1-3	22 January 2023
(Kenya) Elvis Rupia	Police	Tusker	3-0	28 January 2023
(Kenya) Victor Omune^{4}	Leopards	Talanta	0-6	9 February 2023
(Kenya) Benson Omala	Gor Mahia	Wazito	4-0	14 February 2023
(Uganda) Patrick Kaddu	Gor Mahia	Vihiga	5-0	29 March 2023
