= 2018–19 Kenyan Premier League =

Kenyan Premier League
- Season: 2018–19
- Champions: Gor Mahia
- Matches: 306
- Goals: 687 (2.25 per match)
- Top goalscorer: Three players (17 goals)

The 2018–19 Kenyan Premier League is the 16th season of the Kenyan Premier League, the top-tier football league in Kenya, since it began in 2003, and the 56th season of top-division football in Kenya since 1963. The season started on 8 December 2018.

== League table ==
Pos	Team	Pld	W	D	L	GF	GA	GD	Pts	Qualification or relegation
1	Gor Mahia (C)	34	21	9	4	58	25	+33	72	Qualification for Champions League
2	Bandari	34	18	10	6	45	29	+16	64	Qualification for Confederation Cup (Note: Bandari are FKF President's Cup winners.)
3	Sofapaka	34	16	14	4	50	30	+20	62	
4	Tusker	34	15	11	8	49	33	+16	56	
5	SoNy Sugar	34	16	8	10	41	28	+13	56	
6	Mathare United	34	14	13	7	48	35	+13	55	
7	Kakamega Homeboyz	34	14	10	10	48	31	+17	52	
8	Ulinzi Stars	34	10	15	9	36	32	+4	45	
9	Kariobangi Sharks	34	10	15	9	40	37	+3	45	
10	Kenya Commercial Bank	34	11	12	11	38	36	+2	45	
11	AFC Leopards	34	11	10	13	33	39	−6	43	
12	Nzoia Sugar	34	9	12	13	31	36	−5	39	
13	Western Stima	34	8	15	11	27	37	−10	39	
14	Chemelil Sugar	34	8	10	16	27	41	−14	34	
15	Zoo Kericho	34	7	12	15	30	49	−19	33	
16	Posta Rangers	34	7	11	16	28	36	−8	32	Relegation playoffs
17	Vihiga United (R)	34	4	14	16	27	48	−21	26	Relegation
18	Mount Kenya United (R)	34	5	3	26	31	85	−54	18	Relegation

Source: KPL
(C) Champions; (R) Relegated

== Top scorers ==
Rank	Player	Club	Goals
1	(Kenya) Enosh Ochieng	Ulinzi Stars	17
1	(Uganda) Umaru Kasumba	Sofapaka	17
1	(Kenya) Allan Wanga	Kakamega	17
4	(Kenya) Cliff Nyakeya	Mathare United	15
5	(Kenya) Boniface Muchiri	Tusker	13
5	(Kenya) Yemi Mwana	Bandari	13
7	(Kenya) Danson Chetambe	Zoo	11
8	(Kenya) Derrick Otanga	Sony Sugar	10
9	(Kenya) Enoch Agwanda	Sony Sugar	9
9	(Kenya) Erick Kapaito	Kariobangi Sharks	9
9	(Kenya) Nicholas Kipkirui	Gor Mahia	9
9	(Rwanda) Jacques Tuyisenge	Gor Mahia	9

=== Hat-tricks ===
Player	For	Against	Score	Date
(Uganda) Erisa Ssekisambu	Gor Mahia	Mount Kenya Utd	4-1	16 January 2019
(Kenya) Sydney Lokale	Kariobangi Sharks	Ulinzi Stars	3-1	7 February 2019
(Kenya) Erick Kapaito	Kariobangi Sharks	Vihiga United	4-0	29 May 2019
(Kenya) Enosh Ochieng	Ulinzi Stars	Mount Kenya Utd	4-0	2 June 2019
