= F.C. Kariobangi Sharks =

Association football club in Kenya

Kariobangi Sharks
- Full name: Kariobangi Sharks
- Nicknames: K. Sharks; Wapakaji; The Sharkmen
- Short name: Sharks
- Founded: 2000; 26 years ago
- Owner: Nick Mwendwa
- Chairman: Robert Maoga
- Head coach: William Muluya
- League: FKF Premier League
- 2025–26: KPL, 16th of 18
Home colours	Away colours

F.C. Kariobangi Sharks, commonly known as Sharks or K. Sharks, is a Kenyan professional football club. They have been featured in Kenya's top league, the FKF Premier League, since the year 2017.

== History ==
Kariobangi Sharks was founded in the year 2000 and started in the lower divisions of the Nairobi league. The club offered an escape for the youth living around the area, which was considered a crime hot spot.

The club came to life after a young man by the name Nick Mwendwa tracked a set of young players who leisurely passed time at the basketball court of Holy Trinity Catholic Church, Kariobangi mostly after school going hours and during the weekends.

He offered them guidance and assistance through his savings to provide the bare necessities such as balls and boots. He then started training them every weekend. The team started out as Kariobangi Sportive, but after a few years rebranded to be known as Kariobangi Sharks FC.

After playing in local tournaments for some time, the team was finally registered to make them eligible of playing in the lowest tier in the country starting with Nairobi County League.

As has been the norm from its early days, Sharks is known for bringing unknown players to light by handing them vital playtime at the topmost level.

The team trains at Utalii College where the management has signed a memorandum of understanding with the school to allow them to use the grounds while upgrading the facilities. The clubs' traditional colors are yellow and green with either kit being worn with socks of the same color.

== Promotions ==
A few years after inception, the team scaled upward from Division II which was the lowest national football tier. In 2011 the club was promoted to the KFF Nationwide League and finished fourth on their first attempt in Kenya's second-tier league. The team had a fair chance of promotion while featuring at the same level the next year in what had been rebranded to the 2012 FKF Division One. But after topping the standings for a better part of the first leg, the team dipped in the second half and ended up seventh.

Sharks were to give promotion another shot in 2013 while featuring in the FKF Div One-Gr 2 but were to contend with a fourth-place finish. The attempts continued through the 2014 Kenyan National Super League and 2015 seasons, and it is toward the end of the 2016 season that the team earned promotion to the Kenyan Premier League after beating Nzoia Sugar F.C. 1–0 in the final game on 10 Dec in Sudi Stadium. Patilah Omoto, a Shark's homegrown player, and captain, scored the lone goal that guaranteed elevation.

Sharks made its Kenyan Premier League debut against 15-time champions Gor Mahia F.C. in Thika Stadium on Sunday 12 Mar 2017 but had a false start losing the game 3–1. Ugandan forward Mathew Tayo Odongo scored a consolation in added time to become the first Shark's player to score in the premier league.

The team went on to lose the next two games to Muhoroni Youth and Ulinzi Stars by identical 1-0 losses. Their first-ever premier league win was a 2–0 away triumph over Nzoia Sugar in Sudi Stadium on 9 April 2017 after second-half goals by Bolton Omwenga, and Patilah Omoto, and followed it up with a win over Nakumatt FC. The first draw as a 1–1 tie away to Chemelil Sugar on 29 April 2017.

== Club achievements ==
At the end of their debut top-flight season, K. Sharks was placed third with 52 points, and produced the league's top scorer Masoud Juma who scored 17 goals, and the league top goalkeeper John Oyemba who kept 16 clean sheets. Coach William Muluya was voted as the coach of the year, while midfielder Sven Yida was nominated among the league's New Player of the Year.

The team was placed sixth the next season, and once again produced the league's top scorer in Erick Kapaito with 16 goals. He was also named the New Player of the year, the league's Most Valuable Player, and emerged runners-up in the Fair Play category.

Shark again produced the top scorer in the 2020/21 premier league season in Kapaito who scored 24 goals, and went on to win the player of the year award.

== Domestic cup ==
In the year 2017, K. Sharks made it to the final of the GOtv Shield Cup but had to settle for silver after losing 2–0 to A.F.C. Leopards in the final.

"I will not single out one player to congratulate, this was teamwork and it won us the game. Everyone gave his best from the first whistle, and even when we were down, the spirit was amazing. It is what we wanted and have worked hard for it, I am delighted."

— Coach William Muluya after Kariobangi Sharks overpowered Sofapaka in Shield Cup final on 20 Oct 2018.

In the year 2018, K. Sharks returned to the final of the FKF President's Cup, known as 2018 FKF SportPesa Shield due to sponsorship purposes, and were crowned champions after seeing off Sofapaka FC 3–2 in the final with a brace from Ugandan striker George Abege and a goal from Sydney Lokale.

The team got to the Cup final for the third straight year in a row in 2019 but lost their title after going down 3–1 to Bandari FC in a rain derailed final that saw the two halves played on separate days.

K. Sharks made it to the semis of the 2024 domestic cup, dubbed MozzartBet Cup, but missed out on a place in the final after falling to KCB FC on post match penalties at the Police Sacco Stadium in South C, Nairobi.

== Trophies ==
On 3 December 2018, Sharks scooped the Kenyan Super Cup by seeing off league champions Gor Mahia F.C. 1–0.

On 27 Jan 2019, Sharks claimed the SportPesa Cup title after taking down Kenyan counterparts Bandari F.C. (Kenya) 1–0 in Dar es Salaam to earn Kshs 3 million in prize money.

In winning the SportPesa Cup, the team grabbed the chance to play English Premier League side Everton F.C. whom they went on to beat post-match penalties to win the SportPesa Trophy at a packed Kasarani Stadium in Nairobi in July 2019.

== Continental football ==
In late 2018, Sharks featured in continental football for the first time ever after being presented to represent Kenya by virtue of winning the domestic Cup in October 2018. The team featured in the 2018–19 CAF Confederation Cup qualifying rounds starting in the preliminary rounds against Djibouti's Arta/Solar7.

K. Sharks first hosted the Djibouti side at the Moi International Sports Centre, Kasarani on 27 Nov 2018, and went on to register a memorable 6–1 win. Duke Abuya scored the opener in the second minute to become the club's first scorer of a continental goal. The team went on to win the reverse tie 3–0 to proceed to the 1st round proper with a 9-1 aggregate score.

They did not proceed past the next stage after being held to a 0–0 draw at home on 15 Dec 2018 by Ghana's Asante Kotoko who went on to win the reverse tie 2-1 in Kumasi.

== Performance in CAF competitions ==
=== Continental appearances ===
- CAF Confederation Cup: 1 appearance

2018-19 – First Round

=== Continental results ===
Season	Competition	Round	Country	Club	Score
2018–19	Confederation Cup	Preliminary Round	Djibouti	Arta/Solar7	6-1,0-3
2018–19	Confederation Cup	First Round	Ghana	Asante Kotoko	0-0,2-1

== Records ==
Type	Nat	Name	Record
Most Trophies Won - Coach	(Kenya)	William Muluya	4
Most league goals	(Kenya)	Erick Kapaito	51
Most capped player	(Kenya)	Osborne Monday	27
Most league goals in a season	(Kenya)	Erick Kapaito	24
Longest unbeaten run	(Kenya)	2016 NSL	29
Record victory	(Kenya)	vs Kisumu All Stars vs Muhoroni Youth	8–1; 7-0
Record defeat	(Kenya)	vs Homeboyz	6–1
Inter-record victory	(Burundi)	vs AS Arta/Solar7	6-1

=== Premier League records ===
Season	Pos	Record								
Season	Pos	P	W	D	L	F	A	GD	CS	Pts
2017	3	34	13	13	8	42	26	16	16	52
2018	6	34	13	12	9	48	40	8	10	51
2018–19	9	34	10	15	9	40	37	3	11	45
2019-20	12	22	4	8	10	27	32	-5	7	20
2020-21	5	32	14	6	12	45	42	3	11	48
2021-22	10	34	12	9	13	44	39	5	10	45
2022-23	11	34	10	11	13	46	46	0	5	41
2023-24	7	34	12	12	10	44	34	10	10	48
2024-25	11	34	8	16	10	29	29	0	13	40
2025-26	16	34	8	14	12	30	33	-3	14	38
Total		326	104	108	106	395	358	37	107	428

=== Second tier League records ===
Season	Pos	Record								
Season	Pos	P	W	D	L	F	A	GD	CS	Pts
2011	3	28	19	6	3	53	19	34		63
2012	7	37	16	9	12	51	42	9	14	57
2013	4	22	11	5	6	36	25	11	7	38
2014	8	22	5	9	8	19	25	-6	9	24
2015	4	38	18	8	5	44	21	23	16	62
2016	2	38	24	11	3	58	21	37	21	83
Total		185	91	48	37	261	153	97	60	289

CS - Clean Sheet

==== Domestic Cup ====
Season	Round	Opposition	Score	Ref
2013	Third	Karuturi Sports	1(8) - 1(7)	
2014	Second	Nyakach United	0(4) - 0(2)	
2015	First	Kenya Police	3-2	
2016	Semis	Ulinzi Stars	4-1	
2017	Final	AFC Leopards	2-0	
2018	Champions	Sofapaka	3-2	
2018-19	Final	Bandari	3-1	
2019-20	Qtrs	-	(Note: Not played - Games abandoned due to Coronavirus)	
2020-21	Qtrs	Gor Mahia	2-0	
2021-22	Not played	-	-	(Note: FKF Caretaker Committee running Kenyan football failed to organise the competition)
2012-23	Qtrs	Homeboyz	1-6	
2023-24	Semis	KCB	1(4)-1(2)	
2024-25	Qtrs	Gor Mahia	2-0	
2025-26	Rnd of 16	Tusker FC	1-0	

== Honors ==
- Kenyan National Super League
  - Runners-up (1): 2016
- GOtv Shield
  - Runners-up (2): 2017, 2019
  - Champion (1): 2018
- Kenyan Super Cup
  - Champion (1): 2018/19
- SportPesa Super Cup
  - Champion (1): 2019
- SportPesa Trophy
  - Champion (1): 2019

== Management and staff ==
Position	Nat.	Name
Owner	(Kenya)	Nick Mwendwa
Chairman	(Kenya)	Robert Maoga
CEO	(Kenya)	Lynda Ambiyo

== Technical team ==
Position	Nat.	Name
Head Coach	(Kenya)	William Muluya
Assistant Coach	(Kenya)	Edward Seda
Goalkeeper Coach	(Kenya)	Jerim Onyango
Head of Medical	(Kenya)	John Kemboi
Team Manager	(Kenya)	Mathew Sam
Media Liaison	(Kenya)	Allan Netia
Kit Manager	(Kenya)	Paul Otieno
Analyst	(Kenya)	Josh Angatia
Video Analyst	(Kenya)	Enock Muuwo

== Past coaches ==
- (Kenya) Ayub Inziani
- (Kenya) Leonard Odipo
- (Kenya) Bernard Ndolo (July 2009 - 2012)
- (Kenya) Stanley Okumbi (2012-Nov 2014)
- (Kenya) Michael Amenga (Nov 2014-June 2016)
- (Kenya) William Muluya (Jun 2016-to date)

== Youth Team coaches ==
- (Kenya) Beldine Odemba
- (Kenya) David Mbugua
- (Kenya) Benard Kawinzi
- (Kenya) Geofrey Wangalwa

== Players ==
As of 28 May 2024

Note: Flags indicate national team as defined under FIFA eligibility rules; some limited exceptions apply. Players may hold more than one non-FIFA nationality.

No.	Pos.	Nation	Player
1	GK	KEN	Kevin Ouru
2	DF	SSD	Ghai Panchol
3	DF	KEN	Frederick Alushula
4	DF	KEN	Ian Karani
5	MF	KEN	Isaac Wasambo
6	DF	KEN	Biko Omollo
7	FW	KEN	Victor Ngume
8	MF	KEN	Andreas Odhiambo
9	FW	KEN	Eric Mmata
10	FW	KEN	Fortune Omotto
11	FW	KEN	Geoffrey Onyango
12	FW	KEN	Stanley Wilson
13	DF	KEN	Kevin Musamali
14	DF	KEN	Timothy Ekhavi
15	MF	KEN	Biron Otieno

No.	Pos.	Nation	Player
16	GK	KEN	Bernard Jairo
17	MF	KEN	Sigmunn Maina
19	FW	KEN	Steve Mbulere
20	MF	KEN	Mathew Kibiwott
21	MF	KEN	Leonlevitt Osiago
22	FW	KEN	Julius Masaba
23	MF	KEN	Keith Imbali
24	FW	KEN	John Mark Makwatta
25	DF	KEN	Kevin Luke Otiala
26	FW	KEN	Moses Shikanda
27	MF	KEN	Lennox Kimani
28	FW	KEN	Patrick Ngunyi
32	DF	KEN	Zablon Kutela
40	GK	KEN	Sebastian Wekesa

== Notable past players ==
- (Kenya) Erick Kapaito
- (Kenya) Patilah Omoto
- (Kenya) Sydney Lokale
- (Kenya) James Mazembe
- (Kenya) Osborne Monday
- (Uganda) George Abege
- (Kenya) Enock Wanyama
- (Kenya) Daniel Sakari
- (South Sudan) John Kuol Chol
- (Kenya) Ovella Ochieng
- (Kenya) Herit Mungai
- (Kenya) Sven Yida
- (Kenya) Alphonce Omija
- (Kenya) Cavin Odongo
- (Kenya) Bolton Omwenga
- (Tanzania) Athanas Mdamu
- (Tanzania) Amani Kyata
- (Kenya) Masoud Juma
- (Kenya) Wycliffe Onyango
- (Kenya) Duke Abuya
- (Kenya) Tom Teka
- (Kenya) Boniface Onyango
- (Kenya) Geoffrey Shiveka
- (Kenya) Brian Bwire
- (Kenya) John Oyemba
- (Kenya) Eric Juma
- (The Gambia) Ebrimah Sanneh
- (Kenya) Pascal Ogweno
- (Kenya) Ellie Asieche
- (Kenya) Ibrahim Kitawi
- (Uganda) Mathew Odongo
- (Kenya) Vincent Wasambo

== Top scorers per season ==
Top scorers per season. * Award shared during that season

Year	Player	Goals
*2012	(Kenya) Meshack Karani	8
*2012	(Kenya) Vincent Odongo	8
2013	(Kenya) Samuel Muringu	8
2014	(Kenya) Francis Nambute	3
*2015	(Kenya) Ibrahim Kitawi	7
*2015	(Kenya) Rodgers Omondi	7
2016	(Kenya) Ibrahim Kitawi	12
2017	(Kenya) Masoud Juma	17**
2018	(Kenya) Erick Kapaito	16**
2018-19	(Kenya) Erick Kapaito	9
*2019-20	(Kenya) Duke Abuya	3
*2019-20	(Kenya) Sydney Lokale	3
*2019-20	(Kenya) Patrick Otieno	3
2020-21	(Kenya) Erick Kapaito	24**
2021-22	(Kenya) Felix Oluoch	12
2022-23	(Kenya) Tyson Otieno	9
2023–24	(Kenya) John Mark Makwatta	16
2024–25	(Tanzania) Ally Salum	5
2025-26	(Kenya) Humphrey Aroko	12

**League top scorer

== Shirt sponsor & kit manufacturer ==
Kit suppliers
Season	Supplier	Shirt Sponsor
2017	(England) Umbro	Teke Taxi
2018-19	(England) Umbro	Ganjii
2019-2022	(England) Umbro	Betway
2022-23	(Germany) Uhlsport	None
2023-24	(Kenya) Team	None
