= John Kuol Chol =

South Sudanese footballer

Personal information
- Full name: John Kuol Chol Joh
- Date of birth: 9 November 1999 (age 27)
- Place of birth: Makuach, Sudan (now South Sudan)
- Height: 1.97 m (6 ft 6 in)
- Position: Defender

Team information
- Current team: Dandenong City

Senior career*
Years	Team	Apps	(Gls)
2018	Chemelil Sugar	12	(1)
2018	Kariobangi Sharks	13	(0)

International career^{‡}
	South Sudan U23	1	(0)
2019–	South Sudan	2	(0)
- * Club domestic league appearances and goals as of 20 May 2022 ‡ National team caps and goals as of 16 November 2020

John Kuol Chol Joh (born 9 November 1999), known as John Kuol Chol, is a South Sudanese footballer who last played as a defender for Kenyan Premier League club Kariobangi Sharks and the South Sudan national team.
