= Dancan Omala =

Kenyan professional footballer

Dancan Odhiambo Oluoch (Dancan Omala (born 25 Dec 2006)) is a Kenyan footballer who played for the Kenyan Premier League side Nairobi United as a forward.

== Early life ==
He schooled at Kisumu Day. He played for Kisumu-based Manyatta FC and Obunga FC where he was scouted while playing in a Kenya-wide tournament, Chapa Dimba. He is the younger sibling of Kenyan international Benson Omala. and has been capped for Kenya at the junior level.

== Career ==
He was part of the Nairobi United squad that won a double in the 2024–25 season after winning the second-tier league to earn ptomotion to the Kenyan premier league, and the domestic Cup that qualified the team for the 2025-26 CAF Confederation Cup.
