= Godfrey Oduor =

Kenyan football manager

Personal information
- Full name: Godfrey Oduor
- Height: 1.73 m (5 ft 8 in)
- Position: Defender

Managerial career
- Years: Team
- 2019: Kibera Black Stars (head coach)
- 2019: Nzoia Sugar F.C. (head coach)
- 2019-: KCB (assistant coach)
- 2021-: Harambee Starlets (assistant coach)

Godfrey Solo Oduor is a former Kenyan defender who currently serves as the assistant coach at Kenyan Premier League side KCB

== Career ==
Godfrey played his club football at World Hope F.C. Tusker F.C. and KCB. Before joining KCB, he had served as the head coach of second-tier side Kibera Black Stars and Kenyan Premier League side Nzoia Sugar F.C.

He also serves as the assistant coach of Kenya National Women's team, Harambee Starlets.
