= 2019–20 Kenyan Premier League =

Kenyan Premier League
- Season: 2019–20
- Dates: 30 August 2019 – 8 March 2020
- Champions: Gor Mahia
- Relegated: Chemelil Sugar, Kisumu All Stars
- CAF Champions League: Gor Mahia
- Top goalscorer: (Kenya) Timothy Otieno (14 goals)

The 2019–20 Kenyan Premier League was the 17th season of the Kenyan Premier League, the top-tier football league in Kenya, since it began in 2003, and the 57th season of top-division football in Kenya since 1963. The season started on 30 August 2019, but was suspended in March 2020 due to the COVID-19 pandemic, and the final table was determined by the table at the half-way point of the season. As such, Gor Mahia were crowned champions and Chemelil Sugar were relegated, with SoNy Sugar having been expelled earlier in the season. Kisumu All Stars were later relegated after losing in a relegation play-off to Vihiga United.

== Top scorers ==
Rank	Player	Club	Goals
1	(Kenya) Timothy Otieno	Tusker	15
2	(Kenya) John Makwatta	Leopards	12
2	(Kenya) Elvis Rupia	Leopards	12
4	(Kenya) Enoch Agwanda	KCB	11
5	(Kenya) Enosh Ochieng	Ulinzi Stars	10
6	(Kenya) Kenneth Muguna	Gor Mahia	9
7	(Kenya) Collins Neto	Zoo	8
8	(Kenya) Francis Nambute	Posta Rangers	7
8	(Kenya) Benson Omala	Western Stima	7
8	(Kenya) Oscar Wamalwa	Ulinzi Stars	7

=== Hat-tricks ===
Player	For	Against	Score	Date
(Kenya) Elvis Rupia	Wazito	Sony Sugar	4-3	2 November 2019
(Kenya) Elvis Rupia	Wazito	Chemelil	6-0	30 November 2019
(Kenya) Enoch Agwanda	KCB	Posta Rangers	5-1	8 December 2019
(Kenya) Benson Omala	Western Stima	Zoo	4-1	11 December 2019
(Kenya) George Ogutu	Tusker	Chemelil	0-7	4 January 2020
(Kenya) John Makwatta	Leopards	Zoo	4-1	15 January 2020
