= Chris Oguso Cup =

- Founded: 2011
- Region: Kenya
- Current champions: Dallas FC (Boys), Golden Stars FC (Girls) (1st titles)
- Most championships: Red Bees (7 titles)

The Chris Oguso Cup (with name variations due to sponsorship reasons) is an open annual football tournament held in December since the year 2011 in Mahanga village, Mungoma location, in Vihiga County, Kenya.

== History ==
The tournament was founded by former Kenyan Premier League player with Nakuru Police FC Chris Oguso in 2011. Red Bees have won the tournament a record seven times starting with the inaugural tournament in 2011, from 2013 to 2016, 2019, and the 2021 editions.

A record number of teams entered the 2020 edition which was won by Mahanga Boda Boda F.C won the 2021 men's title while Madzuu Ladies took home the girls title in 2021. The 2021 tournament was expanded to cover all the five sub-counties within Vihiga County namely Vihiga, Sabatia, Hamisi, Emuhaya, and Luanda Mungoma.

Kidundu F.C won the expanded 2022 edition after seeing off Red Bees in the final played at Chavavo High School.

New champions emerged in the 2023 edition after Chavavo FC beat Red Bees 2-1 to claim the boys' title in Mahanga Sports Ground as Madira Girls beat Itabalia Ladies 2-1 to win the girls title.

== List of winners ==
Chris Oguso Cup winners
Final	Winners	Score	Runners-up	Venue
2011	Red Bees (1)	2-1	Silver Strikers	Mahanga Sports Ground
2012	Black Santos (1)	1(4)-1(3)	Red Bees	Mahanga Sports Ground
2013	Young Ladies (1)	2-0	Madzuu Ladies	Mahanga Sports Ground
2013	Red Bees (2)	3-1	Silver Strikers	Mahanga Sports Ground
2014	Red Bees (3)	3-0	Madioli FC	Mahanga Sports Ground
2015	Red Bees Queens (1)	1-0	Young Ladies	Mahanga Sports Ground
2015	Red Bees (4)	4-1	Silver Strikers	Mahanga Sports Ground
2016	Red Bees (5)	1-0	Madioli FC	Wamusungu Sports Grounds
2017	Madioli FC (1)	1(3)-1(2)	Red Bees	Mahanga Sports Ground
2018	Silver Strikers (1)	3-2	Vima FC	Mahanga Sports Ground
2019	Red Bees (6)	3-0	Wazee wa Kazi	Ebwali Secondary School
2020	Madzuu FC (1)	2-1	Young Ladies	Ebwali Secondary School
2020	Mahanga Boda Boda (1)	1(2)-1(1)	Red Bees	Ebwali Secondary School
2021	Mustered Queens (1)	1–0	Red Bees Queens	Mumboha Stadium
2021	Red Bees (7)	3–0	Vigogo FC	Mumboha Stadium
2022	Kidundu FC (1)	3–0	Lakers FC	Chavavo High School
2023	Madira Girls (1)	2–0	Itabania Ladies	Mahanga Sports Ground
2023	Chavavo FC (1)	2-1	Red Bees	Mahanga Sports Ground
2024	Dallas FC (1)	0(4)-0(2)	Red Bees	Mahanga Sports Ground
2024	Golden Stars FC (1)	2-1	Nice FC	Mahanga Sports Ground

== Results by club ==
Chris Oguso Cup winners by club
Club	Winners	Runners-up	Years won	Years runner-up
Red Bees	7	5	2011, 2013, 2014, 2015, 2016, 2019, 2021	2012, 2017, 2020, 2023, 2024
Black Santos	1		2012	
Young Ladies FC	1	2	2013	2015, 2020
Red Bees Queens	1	1	2015	2021
Madioli FC	1	2	2017	2014, 2016
Silver Strikers	1	3	2018	2011, 2013, 2015
Mahanga Boda Boda FC	1		2020	
Madzuu FC	1	1	2020	2013
Mustered Queens	1		2021	
Kidundu F.C	1		2022	
Madira Girls	1		2023	
Golden Stars FC	1		2024	
Chavavo F.C	1		2023	
Dallas F.C	1		2024	
Vima FC		1		2018
Wazee wa Kazi		1		2019
Vigogo FC		1		2021
Lakers FC		1		2022
Itabania Ladies		1		2023
Nice FC		1		2024
