= Peter Okidi =

Kenyan football manager

Personal information
- Full name: Peter Okidi
- Date of birth: 1 December 1981 (age 44)

Managerial career
- Years: Team
- 2024-: Shabana F.C.

Peter Okidi is a former Kenyan footballer who currently serves as the head coach at Kenyan Premier League side Shabana F.C.

== Career ==
Okidi previously coached Nakuru Allstars, Kakamega Homeboyz, Migori Youth, Nakuru Bucks, among other clubs in Kenya.
