= Ken Kenyatta =

Kenyan footballer (born 1968)

Ken Kenyatta (born 22 Nov 1968) is a former Kenyan international goalkeeper currently serving as the head coach of Kenyan Premier League side Kakamega Homeboyz F.C..

He previously coached F.C. Talanta, aiding their promotion to the Kenyan Premier League in 2021, and Ushuru F.C.
