= John Oyemba =

Kenyan footballer (born 1993)

John Oyemba (born 3 June 1993) is a Kenyan professional goalkeeper who featured for Kenyan Premier League sides Kariobangi Sharks and AFC Leopards and Kenya. He later moved to Norway to join Fjellhamar FK.

== Career ==
Oyemba featured for Kariobangi Sharks for several years including during the 2016 season when the team was promoted to the Kenyan top flight. He later left the side to join AFC Leopards.

When not playing football Oyemba was a known baker and sold pastries to fellow Kenyan footballers to complement his earnings.

== International career ==
Oyemba was part of the Kenyan team that featured at the 2019 Africa Cup of Nations hosted by Egypt. He was later capped twice for Kenya between July and August 2019.

== External references ==
- John Ayemba@FootballCritic*
