= Chris Oguso =

Superintendent of Kenya Police

Chris Mmbwanga Oguso, HSC
- Born: 25 December 1976 (age 49); Maringo Estate, Nairobi
- Citizenship: Kenya
- Education: Egerton University; Bachelor of Arts degree in criminology and security studies University of Nairobi; Master of Arts in Sociology (Criminology and Social Order)
- Known for: Criminology, Security
- Title: Commissioner of Police

Chris Mmbwanga Oguso, HSC, is a commissioner with Kenya Police, the chief executive officer of Kenya Police F.C., and a grassroots football developer.

== Professional career ==
Oguso started as a police constable in 1997 and rose through the ranks to become a commissioner of police in 2025.

Between 2010 and 2015, Oguso was sent by the Kenya Government to investigate a 2010 terror attack in Kampala, Uganda, as the lead phone analyst. He had similar assignments in 2013 (Westgate, Nairobi), 2015 (Garissa University), and 2019 (DusitD2, Nairobi). In 2022, he was assigned to the office of the Prime Cabinet Secretary.

== Soccer career ==
In 2011, he launched the annual Chris Oguso Cup, a football tournament that provides a platform for young talent in Mahanga Village, Mungoa location, in Vihiga County. In February 2021, Oguso was appointed as the chief executive officer of Police F.C.

== Awards ==
During Kenya's Jamhuri Day celebration on 12 December 2022, Oguso was decorated by the President of the Republic William Ruto with a Head of State Commendation (HSC) for his service to the nation.
