= Brian Bwire =

Kenyan footballer (born 2000)

Personal information
- Full name: Brian Okoth Bwire
- Date of birth: 19 June 2000 (age 26)
- Place of birth: Bureti, Kenya
- Height: 1.81 m (5 ft 11 in)
- Position: Goalkeeper

Team information
- Current team: Polokwane City
- Number: 50

Senior career*
Years	Team	Apps	(Gls)
2018–2021	Kariobangi Sharks		
2021–2024	Tusker		
2024–	Polokwane City	26	(0)

International career
2021	Kenya	2	(0)
- * Club domestic league appearances and goals as of 4 January 2026

Brian Okoth Bwire is a Kenyan professional footballer who plays as goalkeeper for South African Premier Soccer League side Polokwane City.

He has been capped for the Kenya national team.

== Career ==
Bwire turned out for Kenyan Premier League side Kariobangi Sharks, and Tusker FC. He joined Polokwane City in 2024.

He broke into the Kenya National team setup in 2021 and made his debut against Mali in a 2022 World Cup qualifier at Nyayo Stadium.
