= Cavin Odongo =

Kenyan footballer (born 1996)

Personal information
- Date of birth: 20 October 1996 (age 30)
- Position: Striker

Team information
- Current team: Kariobangi Sharks

Senior career*
Years	Team	Apps	(Gls)
2015	Kitengela Shooters		
2016	Posta Rangers	22	(4)
2017–	Kariobangi Sharks		

International career^{‡}
2016–	Kenya	2	(0)
- * Club domestic league appearances and goals as of 18:26, 3 July 2017 (UTC) ‡ National team caps and goals as of 18:26, 3 July 2017 (UTC)

Cavin Odongo (born 20 October 1996) is a Kenyan international footballer who plays for Kariobangi Sharks, as a striker.

== Career ==
Odongo has played club football for Kitengela Shooters, Posta Rangers and Kariobangi Sharks.

He made his international debut for Kenya in 2016.
