= Duke Abuya =

Kenyan footballer (born 1994)

Personal information
- Full name: Duke Abuya
- Date of birth: 23 March 1994 (age 32)
- Height: 1.82 m (6 ft 0 in)
- Position: Attacking midfielder

Team information
- Current team: Young Africans

Youth career
- GFE 105

Senior career*
Years	Team	Apps	(Gls)
2015-17	Mathare United F.C.		
2017-21	F.C. Kariobangi Sharks	4	(0)
2021	Nkana F.C.	11	(0)
2021-2023	Kenya Police		
2023-24	Singida Fountain Gate F.C.	4	(1)
2024 -	Young Africans	7	(1)
- * Club domestic league appearances and goals as of 26/6/25 @ 17:40(AEST)

Duke Abuya is a Kenyan professional footballer who plays as a midfielder for Tanzanian Premier League side Young Africans and the Kenyan national team.

== Career ==
Abuya started out at Eldoret-based GFE 105 before joining Kenyan Premier League side Mathare United. He has also featured for Kariobangi Sharks, as well as Zambian side Nkana FC, and Tanzania sides Singida, Ihefu FC, and now Yanga, all while on loan from Kenya Police.
