= Sammy Okoth =

Kenyan footballer

Sammy Okoth is a Kenyan football coach and former player who is head coach of second-tier side Migori Youth as head coach. He is the immediate former coach of Kenyan Premier League side Shabana FC.

Okoth formerly coached Vihiga United and Zoo Kericho.

As a player, he represented the Kenya national team.
