= Amani Kyata =

Tanzanian footballer

Personal information
- Full name: Amani Peter Kyata
- Date of birth: 26 April 1993 (age 33)
- Place of birth: Moshi, Tanzania
- Height: 1.80 m (5 ft 11 in)
- Position: Defender

Team information
- Current team: Namungo

Senior career*
Years	Team	Apps	(Gls)
- Moro United
2011–2014	African Lyon		
2014–2016	Mwadui United		
2016–2017	African Lyon		
2017–2018	Chemelil Sugar	19	(3)
2018	Nakumatt	7	(0)
2018–2019	Mount Kenya United	24	(7)
2019–2020	Kariobangi Sharks		
2020–	Namungo		

International career
2017	Tanzania	1	(0)
- * Club domestic league appearances and goals

Amani Peter Kyata (born 26 April 1993) is a Tanzanian footballer who plays club football for Namungo. He plays international football for Tanzania and the Tanzania U-20 National Team.
