= David Majak =

South Sudanese footballer

Personal information
- Full name: David Majak Chan
- Date of birth: 10 October 2000 (age 26)
- Place of birth: South Sudan
- Position: Striker

Senior career*
Years	Team	Apps	(Gls)
2018	Kakamega Homeboyz		
2019	Mt Kenya United	7	(4)
2019–2021	Tusker	37	(15)
2021	Kalmar	0	(0)
2021	→ IFK Luleå (loan)	12	(3)
2022	Tusker	4	(1)

International career
2019–	South Sudan	7	(0)
- * Club domestic league appearances and goals as of 21 November 2021

David Majak Chan (born 10 October 2000) is a South Sudanese footballer who plays as a striker.

== Career ==
=== Club career ===
Majak started his career with Kenyan side Kakamega Homeboyz. In 2019, Majak signed for Tusker in Kenya, where he was accused of forging birth certificates. In 2021, he signed for Swedish top flight club Kalmar. After that, Majak was sent on loan to IFK Luleå in the Swedish third division.

=== International career ===
He is eligible to represent Kenya internationally, having lived there for over 12 years.
