= Leonard Odipo =

Kenyan football manager

Personal information
- Full name: Leonard Odipo
- Height: 1.84 m (6 ft 0 in)

Managerial career
- Years: Team
- 2023-24: Mathare United

Leonard Mathews Otieno Odipo is a Kenyan manager, and the immediate former coach of Mathare United. He is a coach educator at Football Kenya Federation

== Career ==
In the past, Odipo handled Kibera Celtic, was an assistant and interim coach at Tusker FC, head coach at Kenyan premier league side Sony Sugar, and coach of second tier sides Nairobi Stima, Kibera Black Stars, and Mathare United.
