= Brian Michira =

Kenyan professional footballer

Brian Michira Migiro is a Kenyan footballer who turns out for Kenyan Premier League side Shabana and Kenya's national team, Harambee Stars.

== Career ==
Michira, who hails from Nyamira County, formerly turned out for Jets FC in 2021 before joing Shabana. He was part of the Kenyan squad that featured in the 2024 African Nations Championship held across East Africa in August 2025.
