= Benson Omala =

Kenyan footballer

Personal information
- Full name: Benson Omala Ochieng
- Date of birth: 16 October 2001 (age 25)
- Place of birth: Kisumu County
- Height: 1.79 m (5 ft 10 in)
- Position: Striker

Youth career
- Chipolopolo

Senior career*
Years	Team	Apps	(Gls)
2019	Western Stima FC	4	(7)
2020–21	Gor Mahia	15	(-)
2021	→ FC Linköping City (loan)	-	(-)
2022–24	Gor Mahia	54	(45)
2024	Safa	0	(0)
2025	Visakha	9	(3)

International career^{‡}
2023–	Kenya	6	(2)
- * Club domestic league appearances and goals ‡ National team caps and goals as of 2 July 2024

Benson Omalla Ochieng is a Kenyan professional footballer who plays as a striker for Kenya national team.

Omalla, finished second-best scorer in the 2022–23 Kenyan Premier League while turning out for Kenyan Premier League club Gor Mahia, and was the top scorer in the 2023–24 Kenyan Premier League with 19 goals.He has also featured for the Kenya U-20 and U-23 sides.

== Personal life ==
Omalla comes from a footballing family and is the elder sibling of Dancan Omala who turns out for Kenyan premier league side Nairobi United.
