= Joshua Onyango =

Kenyan boxer

Personal information
- Nickname: Poison (alias)
- Nationality: Kenyan
- Born: 1 December 1975 (age 50) Kisumu, Kenya
- Height: 5 ft 9 in (175 cm)
- Weight: welter/light middle/middleweight

Boxing career
- Stance: Orthodox

Boxing record
- Total fights: 35
- Wins: 15 (KO 12)
- Losses: 19 (KO 9)
- Draws: 1

Joshua "Poison" Onyango (born 1 December 1975 in Kisumu) is a Kenyan professional welter/light middle/middleweight boxer of the 1990s, 2000s and 2010s who won the Kenya welterweight title, East & Central African Professional Boxing Federation welterweight title, and Commonwealth light middleweight title, and was a challenger for the International Boxing Federation (IBF) Inter-Continental light welterweight title against Sergey Bashkirov, his professional fighting weight varied from 144 lb (65 kg; 10 st 4 lb), i.e. Welterweight to 160 lb (73 kg; 11 st 6 lb), i.e. Middleweight.
