= Enoch Agwanda =

Kenyan footballer (born 1994)

Personal information
- Full name: Enoch Obiero Agwanda
- Date of birth: 10 April 1994 (age 32)
- Place of birth: Kisumu, Kenya
- Height: 1.74 m (5 ft 9 in)
- Position: Forward

Team information
- Current team: SoNy Sugar

Senior career*
Years	Team	Apps	(Gls)
2011–2012	SoNy Sugar		
2013–2015	Sofapaka		
2015–2016	Gor Mahia		
2017	Bandari		
2018	Ushuru		
2018–	SoNy Sugar		

International career^{‡}
2012–2015	Kenya	5	(0)
- * Club domestic league appearances and goals as of 1 August 2020 ‡ National team caps and goals as of 1 August 2020

Enoch Obiero Agwanda (born 10 April 1994) is a Kenyan football striker who plays for SoNy Sugar.
