= Sydney Lokale =

Kenyan footballer (born 2000)

Personal information
- Full name: Sydney Simale Lokale
- Date of birth: 19 September 2000 (age 26)
- Place of birth: Nakuru, Kenya
- Height: 1.88 m (6 ft 2 in)
- Position: Forward

Team information
- Current team: KCB

Youth career
- –2017: Ulinzi Stars

Senior career*
| Years | Team | Apps | (Gls) |
| 2018–2022 | Kariobangi Sharks | | |
| 2020 | → HIFK (loan) | 0 | (0) |
| 2022– | KCB | | |

International career
- Kenya U20
- Kenya U23
| 2019– | Kenya | 1 | (0) |
- * Club domestic league appearances and goals as of 25 February 2022

Sydney Simale Lokale (born 19 September 2000) is a Kenyan professional footballer who currently plays as a forward for KCB.

== Career statistics ==
=== Club ===
As of 26 November 2020.

| Club | Season | League | | | Cup | | Continental | | Other | | Total | |
| Club | Season | Division | Apps | Goals | Apps | Goals | Apps | Goals | Apps | Goals | Apps | Goals |
|---|---|---|---|---|---|---|---|---|---|---|---|---|
| HIFK (loan) | 2020 | Veikkausliiga | 0 | 0 | 3 (Note: Appearances in the Suomen Cup) | 0 | 0 | 0 | 0 | 0 | 3 | 0 |
| Career total | | | 0 | 0 | 3 | 0 | 0 | 0 | 0 | 0 | 3 | 0 |

=== International ===
As of matches played 25 February 2022.

Appearances and goals by national team and year
| National team | Year | Apps | Goals |
|---|---|---|---|
| Kenya | 2019 | 1 | 0 |
| Total | | 1 | 0 |
