= Erick Kapaito =

Kenyan footballer (born 1995)

Personal information
- Full name: Eric Kapaito Muugi
- Date of birth: 25 December 1995 (age 30)
- Place of birth: Namanga, Kenya
- Height: 1.55 m (5 ft 1 in)
- Position: Striker

Team information
- Current team: Tusker

Senior career*
Years	Team	Apps	(Gls)
2016	Ligi Ndogo		
2017	Talanta		
2018–2021	Kariobangi Sharks		
2021–2023	Arba Minch City	43	(11)
2023–	Tusker		

International career^{‡}
2018–	Kenya	4	(1)
- * Club domestic league appearances and goals as of 16:45, 7 January 2024 (UTC) ‡ National team caps and goals as of 18:50, 25 June 2022 (UTC)

Eric Kapaito Muugi (born 25 December 1995) is a Kenyan professional footballer who plays as a striker for Tusker and the Kenya national team.

== Career ==
Born in Namanga, Kapaito spent his early career with Ligi Ndogo and Talanta. With Talanta he scored 15 times in the 2017 season.

He signed Kariobangi Sharks for the 2018 season. He was the Kenyan Premier League top scorer and Most Valuable Player in both the 2018 and 2020–21 seasons.

He moved to Ethiopian club Arba Minch City in September 2021.

He returned to Kenya with Tusker in August 2023. He suffered a 'goal drought' at the start of the season, eventually scoring his first goal in December 2023. He scored a hat-trick in January 2024.

== International career ==
He made his international debut for Kenya in 2018 against Comoros during an international friendly at the Stade de Marrakech in Morocco. His first international goal was against Tanzania at the Nyayo Stadium in March 2021. Nyayo Stadium

== Career statistics ==
=== International ===
As of 25 June 2022

Kenya
Year	Apps	Goals
2018	2	0
2021	2	1
Total	4	1

=== International goals ===
As of 25 June 2022 (scores and results list Kenya's goal tally first)

Goal	Date	Venue	Opponent	Score	Result	Competition
1.	15 March 2021	Nyayo Stadium, Nairobi, Kenya	Tanzania	1–0	2–1	Friendly
