= Kenya Police F.C. =

Kenyan football club

Kenya Police
- Full name: Kenya Police Football Club
- Nickname: Makarao
- Founded: 2014
- Ground: Kenya Police Sacco Stadium; Nyayo National Stadium (selected matches)
- Capacity: 5,000; 18,000
- Owner: Kenya Police
- Chairman: Nyale Munga
- Head coach: Nicholas Muyoti
- League: Kenyan Premier League
- 2025–26: KPL, 3rd
Home colours	Away colours

Kenya Police Football Club, also referred to as Police Football Club, is a professional football club based in Nairobi, Kenya. The team currently competes in the Kenya Premier League. They play their home games at the Kenya Police Sacco Stadium. The club chairman is Nyale Munga and the CEO Chris Oguso. The club is owned and run by the Kenya Police.

== History ==
Kenya Police F.C. was founded in 2014 by the player George Maelo, himself the son of a former Kenya Police officer. The board features representation from the Police service. As representatives of the police, with some being serving police officers, the serving players are liable for call up to the General Service Unit. In their first two years, the club was undefeated and earned consecutive promotions through the Kenyan football pyramid. Maelo left the club in 2016 to move to Sofapaka but returned in 2021 as the team manager.

They were promoted to the top flight of Kenyan football from the Kenyan National Super League in 2021. This promotion came after Kenya Police beat Vihiga United by an aggregate score of 2-1 in a two legged final.

The club made its African continental debut in 2024 in the CAF Champions League, going out in the first round to Zamalek SC from Egypt. In 2025, Kenya Police won the Kenya Premier League for the first time. Their rivals Gor Mahia gave them a guard of honour after they had statistically won the title. This came after they had been near the bottom of the league in the early part of the season and had been considered likely to be relegated. Kenya Police won their first CAF Champions League match in 2025, progressing from their first round tie with Mogadishu City Club on away goals with a 3-3 aggregate score.

== Honours ==
- Kenyan Premier League (1): 2024–25
- FKF President's Cup (1): 2024
