= William Muluya =

Kenyan football coach (born 1986)

Personal information
- Full name: William Muluya
- Date of birth: 1 November 1986 (age 39)

Team information
- Current team: Kariobangi Sharks (coach)

Managerial career
- Years: Team
- 2011: MYSA (ass. coach)
- 2012-2016: Mathare United (team manager)
- 2016 -: Kariobangi Sharks

William Kanu Muluya is a Kenyan football manager who currently serves as the head coach of Kenyan National Super League side Kariobangi Sharks.

== Career ==
He started his coaching career at Mathare Youth Sports Association before serving as the team manager and assistant coach of Mathare United for four-and-a-half years from 2012. He then joined F.C. Kariobangi Sharks in June 2016 as head coach while the club featured in the Kenyan second-tier National Super League season.

In his first year as coach, Muluya led Kariobangi Sharks to promotion to the 2017 Kenyan Premier League, and has won several titles with the club including the domestic GOtv Shield in 2018, Kenyan Super Cup in 2018–19, SportPesa Super Cup and SportPesa Trophy against Everton F.C. in 2019, as well as qualify the club for continental football.

He was named the 2014 team manager of the year while at Mathare United and won the Kenyan Premier League coach of the year in 2017.

== Honors ==
=== Club ===
Kariobangi Sharks

- Kenyan Nationwide League runners-up: 2016
- GOtv Shield champion: 2018; runners-up: 2017, 2019
- Kenyan Super Cup champion: 2018–19
- SportPesa Super Cup champion: 2019
- SportPesa Trophy champion: 2019

=== Individual ===
- Kenyan Premier League Coach of the Year: 2017 (Kariobangi Sharks)
- Kenyan Premier League Team manager of the Year: 2014 (Mathare United)
