= Kenya Commercial Bank S.C. =

Kenyan sports club

KCB
- Full name: KCB Football Club
- Nickname: Sidwedwe
- Founded: 1993; 33 years ago
- Ground: Nairobi City Stadium; Nairobi, Kenya
- Capacity: 15,000
- Chairman: (Kenya) Harold Mwenja
- Head coach: (Kenya) Robert Matano
- League: Kenya Premier League
- 2025–2026: 7th
Home colours

Kenya Commercial Bank Sports Club, commonly known as KCB, and nicknamed Sidwedwe, is a Kenyan multi-sport club based in Nairobi currently playing in the Kenyan Premier League.

== History ==
Owned by the Kenya Commercial Bank, the club's football team played for several years in the Kenyan Premier League, but were relegated at the end of the 2015 season after finishing in 15th place. They were promoted again in 2018 after their 2–0 victory against Talanta made it impossible to finish outside of the promotion places.

Kenya Commercial Bank also has rugby, volleyball and chess teams, all of which play in their respective top-flight leagues of Kenya. The KCB Volleyball team is among the most successful ones in Kenya. KCB has its own facilities in Ruaraka, Nairobi, which the rugby team uses as their home ground.

== Departments ==
=== Football ===
The football club was founded in 1993. In 1996 it won the Nairobi Provincial League and was promoted to the Nationwide League. Two years later it won promotion to the Premier League.

==== Honours ====
- Kenyan Transparency Cup: (1)

2004

=== Rugby ===
KCB Rugby section was established in 1989 based on Kenya Breweries team which was disbanded that year.

==== Honours ====
- Kenya Cup: (3)

2005, 2006, 2007

=== Volleyball ===
KCB has both men's and ladies's sections. At the 2007 FIVB Women's World Cup four KCB players played for Kenyan national team

==== Honours ====
- KBF Premier League': (4)'

2001, 2007, 2008, 2009
