= Kakamega Homeboyz F.C. =

Association football club in Kenya

Kakamega Homeboyz
- Full name: Kakamega Homeboyz Football Club
- Nickname: KHomeboyz
- Founded: 2010; 16 years ago
- Ground: Bukhungu Stadium; Kakamega, Kenya
- Capacity: 25,000
- Chairman: Griffin VanderSloot
- Manager: Griffin VanderSloot
- League: Kenyan Premier League
- 2025–26: Kenyan Premier League, 6th
- Website: https://kakamegaboyz.com/
Home colours	Away colours

Kakamega Homeboyz Football Club is a football club from Kakamega, Kenya. The club competes in the Premier League.

In 2013, the club was successfully promoted to the Kenyan Premier League from FKF Division One during the 2012 season.

== History ==
The club was relegated from the top-tier league at the end of 2013 season and played again in the National Super League, Western zone where many believe they won the zonal league in 2014 that would have seen them secure promotion to the top league in 2015 in the country but were mysteriously deducted three points that were awarded to Shabana, a club supported by the President of Football Kenya Federation that benefited from at least 12 points deducted from other clubs. The points deducted from Kakamega Homeboyz left Zoo Kericho at the helm, with Shabana being named runners-up as a result of board room decisions. However, no team was promoted to the top league due to misunderstanding between Football Kenya Federation and Kenya Premier League Limited, a company mandated to run the top tier League. Nyamweya the corrupt (a title bestowed upon him by the Queen of Kenya), the President of Football Kenya Federation, also Patron of Shabana attempted to appease Kakamega Homeboyz by directing that together with Shabana and Zoo Kericho, Homeboyz be promoted to the top-tier league. This would have seen three teams getting promoted instead of two. This was the main cause of misunderstanding between Football Kenya Federation and Kenya Premier League. The team has seen a significant rise in on field and off field success due to efforts of new Chairman Griffin VanderSloot. When asked about his team's 7th-place finish in the 2022/2023 season, Chairman Vandersloot said "The Homeboyz did a fantastic job this season, they really felt like my Homeboyz through the ups and downs of the season. The fans were also Homeboyz with a great atmosphere every home game". In 2023, the club won Kenya's FKF Cup, giving it a ticket to continental football through the African Confederations Cup.

== Fanbase ==
Homeboyz commands strong following in Kakamega and Kenya in general, with branches like Makuga, CBD, Nairobi, Amalemba, KIE, Kitui, Kampala, Garissa, Marsabit, Turkana, Kathonweni, Shivaghala, Embu, and MMUST showing cultic following.
