= Kenyan Premier League =

Kenyan association football league

- Founded: 1963; 63 years ago
- Country: Kenya
- Confederation: CAF
- Number of clubs: 18
- Level on pyramid: 1
- Relegation to: National Super League
- Domestic cup(s): FKF Cup; Super Cup; Top 8 Cup
- International cup(s): CAF Champions League; CAF Confederation Cup
- Current champions: Gor Mahia (2025–26)
- Most championships: Gor Mahia (22 titles)
- Broadcaster(s): Azam TV; KBC
- Website: www.footballkenya.org
- Current: 2026–27 Kenyan Premier League

The Kenyan Premier League (KPL), also the FKF Premier League, officially known as the SportPesa League, is a professional league for men's football clubs in Kenya. Standing at the top of the Kenyan football league system, the league was formed in 1963 under the Kenya Football Federation, but is now controlled by the Football Kenya Federation. It is contested by 18 clubs and operates on a promotion and relegation system with the Kenyan National Super League. Gor Mahia are the current champions, having won the 2025–26 season.

The league was mostly stable until the late 1990s and since then its performance had been considered below average, with many of the league's clubs having little or no finances to support themselves. However, when SuperSport became an official league partner, the league has taken on a more serious role with teams becoming professional and the majority of the clubs managing to get kit sponsorships. This saw the level of competition improve compared to past.

== Origin ==
Following constant wrangles between the then football governing administration and the eventual deteriorating of the National Football League, participating clubs opted out and decided to form a company that would see the smooth running of the league in a professional and transparent manner. In 2003, the Kenyan Premier League was created and registered as a limited liability company whose ownership was shared amongst all the sixteen participating clubs and was to be affiliated to the Kenya Football Federation.

The league was known as the Kenya National Football League from its creation in 1963 to 1996, the Kenyan Super League in 1973 and 1997 and, from 1998, the Kenyan Premier League.

== Corporate structure ==
The Kenyan Premier League is operated and run as a private limited company incorporated in October 2003 under the Companies Act of Kenya. It is fully owned and managed by 18 member shareholders. It is affiliated to the Football Kenya Federation, which is also a shareholder and voting member of the KPL board of directors. Non-voting members include the Kenya Football Coaches Association and the Kenya Football Referees Association.

== Sponsorship ==
East African Breweries, through their Tusker brand, held the naming rights to the league from 2012 to 2015.

The league's growth and increased fan engagement have attracted various corporate partners. The league previously maintained a long-standing broadcasting relationship with SuperSport and equipment deals with Umbro and Puma. On 24 November 2020, the Football Kenya Federation (FKF) signed a seven-year broadcasting deal with StarTimes worth US$1.1 million (KSh110 million) annually. This was followed by a major broadcasting agreement with Azam TV in August 2023. The seven-year deal, valued at US$9.1 million (KSh1.3 billion), established Azam as the official broadcast partner, with an initial payment of US$1 million and a 10% annual increment for subsequent seasons. On 17 September 2025, the FKF and SportPesa entered into a long-term partnership. This 10-year deal, valued at KSh1.12 billion (US$8.6 million), returned the betting firm to the league's primary sponsorship slot.

=== Title sponsor history ===
- Tusker Premier League (2012–2015)
- SportPesa Premier League (2015–2018) The deal ended in 2018 when the company temporarily ceased Kenyan operations.
- BetKing Premier League (2020–2021) However, this agreement was terminated in 2021.
- SportPesa League (2025–present)

== Competition ==
There are 18 clubs in the Kenyan Premier League. During the course of a season, traditionally from February to November, but switched to August to May in 2018, each club plays the others twice (a double round-robin system), for a total of 34 games. If points are equal, the goal difference and then goals scored determine the winner. If still equal, the ordering is determined by their head-to-head records. If there is a tie for the championship, for relegation, or for qualification to other competitions, a play-off match at a neutral venue decides rank. The two lowest placed teams are relegated to the National Super League, with its top two teams promoted in their place. The 16th placed team squares off with the third-best team from the National Super League for the third promotion slot.

== Previous winners ==
Years	Winners
1963	Nakuru All-Stars (1)
1964	Luo Union (1)
1965	Feisal (1)
1966	Abaluhya Léopards (1)
1967	Abaluhya Léopards (2)
1968	Gor Mahia (1)
1969	Not held
1970	Abaluhya Léopards (3)
1971	Scrapped
1972	Tusker (1)
1973	Abaluhya Léopards (4)
1974	Gor Mahia (2)
1975	Luo Union (2)
1976	Gor Mahia (3)
1977	Tusker (2)
1978	Tusker (3)
1979	Gor Mahia (4)
1980	Abaluhya Léopards (5)
1981	Abaluhya Léopards (6)
1982	Abaluhya Léopards (7)
1983	Gor Mahia (5)
1984	Gor Mahia (6)
1985	Gor Mahia (7)
1986	Abaluhya Léopards (8)
1987	Gor Mahia (8)
1988	Abaluhya Léopards (9)
1989	Abaluhya Léopards (10)
1990	Gor Mahia (9)
1991	Gor Mahia (10)
1992	Abaluhya Léopards (11)
1993	Gor Mahia (11)
1994	Tusker (4)
1995	Gor Mahia (12)
1996	Tusker (5)
1997	Utalii (1)
1998	Abaluhya Léopards (12)
1999	Tusker (6)
2000	Tusker (7)
2001	Oserian Fastac (1)
2002	Oserian Fastac (2)
2003	Ulinzi Stars (1)
2004	Ulinzi Stars (2)
2005	Ulinzi Stars (3)
2006	Sony Sugar (1)
2007	Tusker (8)
2008	Mathare United (1)
2009	Sofapaka (1)
2010	Ulinzi Stars (4)
2011	Tusker (9)
2012	Tusker (10)
2013	Gor Mahia (13)
2014	Gor Mahia (14)
2015	Gor Mahia (15)
2016	Tusker (11)
2017	Gor Mahia (16)
2018	Gor Mahia (17)
2018–19	Gor Mahia (18)
2019–20	Gor Mahia (19)
2020–21	Tusker (12)
2021–22	Tusker (13)
2022–23	Gor Mahia (20)
2023–24	Gor Mahia (21)
2024–25	Kenya Police (1)
2025–26	Gor Mahia (22)

Source: RSSSF – Kenya – List of champions

=== Total titles won ===
Club	Winners	Winning years
Gor Mahia	22	1968, 1974, 1976, 1979, 1983, 1984, 1985, 1987, 1990, 1991, 1993, 1995, 2013, 2014, 2015, 2017, 2018, 2018–19, 2019–20, 2022–23, 2023–24, 2025–26
Tusker	13	1972, 1977, 1978, 1994, 1996, 1999, 2000, 2007, 2011, 2012, 2016, 2020–21, 2021–22
A.F.C. Leopards	12	1966, 1967, 1970, 1973, 1980, 1981, 1982, 1986, 1988, 1989, 1992, 1998
Ulinzi Stars	4	2003, 2004, 2005, 2010
Luo Union	2	1964, 1975
Oserian	2	2001, 2002
Nakuru AllStars	1	1963
Feisal	1	1965
Utalii	1	1997
Sony Sugar	1	2006
Mathare United	1	2008
Sofapaka	1	2009
Kenya Police	1	2024–25

== Top scorers in past seasons ==
"This man was a like a lion my friend, he had no mercy with goalkeepers. Most of them used to run away from goal when they see him because he would kill you with the shots. There was no joke. He was on fire. Leave the kids of nowadays alone; you score only 12 goals and you're top scorer? Our days were tough."

— Joe Kadenge speaking in October 2010 on his days as a player with Maurice Ochieng.

The league record for most goals scored in one season is currently held by Maurice Ochieng, who completed the 1976 season with 26 goals for Gor Mahia. His former teammate, Joe Kadenge, praised him as a lethal striker in front of goal.

Year	Player	Club	Goals
1976	(Kenya) Maurice Ochieng	Gor Mahia	26
2006	(Kenya) Boniface Ambani	Tusker	21
2007	(Kenya) Kevin Ngugi	Coast Stars	15
2008	(Kenya) Francis Ouma	Mathare United	15
2009	(Kenya) John Baraza	Sofapaka	15
2009	(Nigeria) Emeka Joseph	Tusker	15
2010	(Kenya) John Baraza	Sofapaka	15
2011	(Kenya) Stephen Waruru	Ulinzi Stars	12
2012	(Kenya) John Baraza	Sofapaka	18
2013	(Kenya) Jacob Keli	KCB FC	17
2014	(Uganda) Dan Sserunkuma	Gor Mahia	16
2015	(Kenya) Jesse Were	Tusker	22
2016	(Kenya) John Makwatta	Ulinzi Stars	18
2017	(Kenya) Masoud Juma	Kariobangi Sharks	17
2018	(Kenya) Erick Kapaito	Kariobangi Sharks	16
2018–19	(Kenya) Allan Wanga	Kakamega Homeboyz	17
2018–19	(Uganda) Umaru Kasumba	Sofapaka	17
2018–19	(Kenya) Enosh Ochieng	Ulinzi Stars	17
2019–20	(Kenya) Timothy Otieno	Tusker	14
2020–21	(Kenya) Erick Kapaito	Kariobangi Sharks	24
2021–22	(Kenya) Derrick Otanga	KCB	16
2022–23	(Kenya) Elvis Rupia	Kenya Police	27
2023–24	(Kenya) Benson Omala	Gor Mahia	19
2024–25	(Kenya) Moses Shumah	Kakamega Homeboyz	17
2025–26	(Kenya) Joe Waithera	Muranga SEAL	19

== Multiple hat-tricks ==
Rank	Country	Player	Hat-tricks
1	(Kenya)	Elvis Rupia	5
2	(Kenya)	Erick Kapaito	4
2	(Kenya)	John Makwatta	4
4	(Kenya)	Benson Omala	3
4	(Kenya)	Jesse Were	3
6	(Kenya)	Enoch Agwanda	1
6	(Kenya)	Boniface Akenga	1
6	(Kenya)	Elvis Barasa	1
6	(Uganda)	Ojok Deogracious	1
6	(Tanzania)	Ibrahim Joshua	1
6	(Kenya)	Lawrence Juma	1
6	(Kenya)	Masoud Juma	1
6	(Uganda)	Patrick Kaddu	1
6	(Rwanda)	Meddie Kagere	1
6	(Kenya)	Michael Karamor	1
6	(Kenya)	Sydney Lokale	1
6	(Kenya)	Boniface Muchiri	1
6	(Kenya)	Paul Mungal	1
6	(Kenya)	Keiphas Mutuu	1
6	(Kenya)	John Mwangi	1
6	(Kenya)	Enosh Ochieng	1
6	(Kenya)	Raymond Ochieng	1
6	(Kenya)	Bernard Odhiambo	1
6	(Kenya)	Vincent Ogolla	1
6	(Kenya)	George Ogutu	1
6	(Kenya)	Michael Olunga	1
6	(Kenya)	Felix Oluoch	1
6	(Kenya)	Justine Omwando	1
6	(Kenya)	Mwingi Shami Kibwama	1
6	(Uganda)	Erisa Ssekisambu	1
6	(Uganda)	Dan Sserunkuma	1
6	(Rwanda)	Jacques Tuyisenge	1
6	(Democratic Republic of the Congo)	Victor Umune	1
6	(Kenya)	Philip Wanjala	1
6	(Kenya)	Stephen Waruru	1
6	(Kenya)	Brian Yakhama	1

== See also ==
- Kenyan Women's Premier League
- Kenyan football league system
- Kagame Interclub Cup
