= 2020–21 Nairobi City Stars season =

Kenyan football club season

Nairobi City Stars
2020–21 KPL season season
- Owner: Jonathan Jackson Foundation
- Chairman: Jonathan Jackson
- Head coach: Sanjin Alagic
- Stadium: Hope Centre
- Kenyan Premier League: 7th
- Betway Cup: Quarterfinal
- Top goalscorer: League: Peter Opiyo (8); All: Peter Opiyo (8)
- Biggest win: 3-0 vs Sofapaka (H), 24 May 2021, Kenyan Premier League
- Biggest defeat: 0–3 vs KCB (A), 21 Aug 2021, Kenyan Premier League

The 2020–21 Kenyan Premier League season was Nairobi City Stars' 19th year in existence and the 13th season in the top flight of Kenyan football. It was the first season back in the top flight since relegation at the end of the 2016 season.

To have earned promotion, City Stars topped the second tier NSL league by March 2020 with 64 points from 28 games after posting 22 wins, four draws and two losses before the league was cut short by the novel corona virus. In spite of that, and as per the rules governing Kenyan football, the team nonetheless got promoted by the Football Kenya Federation after topping the table by the end of the first leg.

The team was coached in the 2020–21 season by Bosnia and Herzegovina-born Sanjin Alagic who arrived in the offseason of 2019 to take over from John Amboko and ultimately got the team back to the top flight at the first time of asking.

Prior to the season, Sanjin lost the services of some players who were key to his promotion campaign; Goalkeeper Levis Opiyo, right back Kevin Okumu, and winger David Gateri all opted to peruse greener pastures as defender Noah Abich chose to hang his boots. That allowed the entry of new players including centre-back Kenedy Onyango from Kakamega Homeboyz, defensive midfielder Sven Yida from Kariobangi Sharks, goalkeeper Stephen Njunge from Wazito and a set of rookies including Timothy Ouma.

City Stars kicked of the season with a great misfortune after receiving the news that their team manager Neville Pudo, who missed a pre match meeting ahead of matchday 2 game against KCB, was found dead in his house. Overall, the season had its unique challenges as it was significantly affected by the impact of the novel COVID-19 with strict restrictions and health protocols to be observed leading to empty stadiums.

The team played 33 of 34 games in the season after one club - Zoo FC - was withdrawn from the league by the Federeration following orders from FIFA for alleged match fixing. Consequently, a matchday 12 game played at Kasarani Annex in February 2021 in which City Stars won 2-1 with goals from Kevin Otieno and Erick Ombija was expunged from the league.

The club reached the quarterfinal of the Domestic Cup after falling 1–0 to Bidco United in Ruaraka having gone past Mutomo Tigers 4–1 in Kitui in the round of 64, edging out Fortune Sacco 1–0 in the round of 32 in Kianyaga, and seeing off Ulinzi Stars 2-0 in the round of 16.

At the end of the season, goalkeeper Stephen Njunge who tended goal in all 33 matches played was feted as the joint second best keeper in the league after registering eleven clean sheets as Noah Abich was named runners-up team manager of the year.

== Technical Bench ==
Position	Staff
Head coach	(Bosnia and Herzegovina) Sanjin Alagic
Assistant head coach	(Bosnia and Herzegovina) Nihad Nalbantic
First assistant coach	(Kenya) John Amboko
Goalkeeper coach	(Kenya) Zachary Onyango
Team manager	(Kenya) Noah Abich
Trainer	(Kenya) Arthur Museve
Team Physio	(Kenya) Brian Odongo
Kit Manager	(Kenya) Joseph Andere

Source: Nairobi City Stars

== Players ==
=== Squad information ===
Players and squad numbers last updated on 19 May 2024. Appearances include all competitions.
Note: Flags indicate national team as has been defined under FIFA eligibility rules. Players only hold one non-FIFA nationality.

No.	Player	Nat.	Positions	Signed in	Contract ends	Signed from	Apps.	Goals
Goalkeepers
1	Elvis Ochoro	(Kenya)	GK	2020	2025	(Kenya) Hakati Sportiff	0	0
16	Stephen Njunge	(Kenya)	GK	2020	2022	(Kenya) Wazito	32	0
16	Jacob Osano	(Kenya)	GK	2020	2022	(Kenya) Nairobi Stima	4	0
Defenders
4	Salim Abdalla	(Kenya)	CB	2019	2022	(Kenya) AFC Leopards	26	1
5	Wesley Onguso	(Kenya)	LB / CB	2019	2021	(Kenya) Posta Rangers	4	0
8	Calvin Masawa (Overall captain)	(Kenya)	LB / RB	2019	2022	(Kenya) Nairobi City Stars	5	0
12	Edwin Buliba	(Kenya)	RB / CB	2019	2022	(Kenya) Nairobi City Stars	10	0
19	Kevin Okumu	(Kenya)	RB / RW	2021	2023	(Kenya) Wazito	22	1
22	Wycliffe Onyango	(Kenya)	CB	2019	2022	(Kenya) Kariobangi Sharks	17	0
25	Kenedy Onyango	(Kenya)	CB	2020	2022	(Kenya) Kakamega Homeboyz	31	0
26	Bolton Omwenga	(Kenya)	LB	2021	2022	(Tanzania) Biashara United	22	2
28	Herit Mungai	(Kenya)	LB / LW	2021	2022	(Kenya) Posta Rangers	18	0
Midfielders
2	Elvis Noor	(Kenya)	CM / DM	2019	2022	Kibera Black Stars	28	0
3	Charles Otieno	(Kenya)	DM	2019	2022	(Kenya) Nairobi City Stars	12	0
10	Peter Opiyo	(Kenya)	CM / DM	2020	2022	(Turkmenistan) Altyn Asyr	25	8
18	Sven Yida	(Kenya)	DM	2020	2022	(Kenya) Kariobangi Sharks	28	1
20	Timothy Ouma	(Kenya)	AM	2020	2023	(Kenya) Laiser Hill Academy	26	0
21	Oliver Maloba	(Kenya)	AM	2019	2022	(Kenya) Nairobi City Stars	25	2
27	Aziz Okaka	(Kenya)	RB / RW	2020	2022	(Kenya) Sony Sugar	14	0
30	Anthony Kimani	(Kenya)	CM / AM	2019	2022	(Kenya) Bandari	29	4
Forwards
7	Rodgers Okumu	(Kenya)	LW / RW	2020	2022	(Kenya) Coast Stima	25	2
9	Vincent Okoth	(Kenya)	ST / AM	2019	2022	(Kenya) Hakati Sportiff	9	0
11	Davis Agesa	(Kenya)	RW / LW / ST	2018	2022	(Kenya) Nairobi City Stars	29	5
15	John Kamau	(Kenya)	LB / LW	2020	2022	(Kenya) Tusker FC	7	0
17	Nicholas Kipkirui	(Kenya)	LW / ST	2021	2023	(Kenya) Gor Mahia	19	4
24	Erick Ombija	(Kenya)	ST	2020	2022	(Kenya) Gor Mahia	27	3
29	Ebrimah Sanneh	(The Gambia)	ST	2019	2022	(Kenya) Kariobangi Sharks	14	2
32	Ezekiel Odera	(Kenya)	ST	2020	2022	(Kenya) AFC Leopards	24	4
Out on loan
6	Ronney Kola	(Kenya)	DM	2020	2025	(Kenya) KSG Ogopa FC	0	0
14	Rowland Makati	(Kenya)	AM	2020	2024	(Kenya) Vaport Sports	0	0

Source: Nairobi City Stars

== Off season transfers ==
=== In ===
==== Offseason ====
Date	Pos.	Player	From	Ref.
19 August 2020	MF	(Kenya) Rowland Makati	(Kenya) Vapor Sports	
20 August 2020	MF	(Kenya) Timothy Ouma	(Kenya) Laiser Hill Academy	
1 September 2020	DM	(Kenya) Ronney Kola	(Kenya) KSG Ogopa FC	
3 September 2020	GK	(Kenya) Elvis Ochoro	(Kenya) Hakati Sportiff	
4 September 2020	ST	(Kenya) Erick Ombija	(Kenya) Gor Mahia	
7 September 2020	DM	(Kenya) Sven Yida	(Kenya) Kariobangi Sharks	
9 September 2020	DF	(Uganda) Yusuf Mukisa	(Uganda) Proline FC	
22 October 2020	CB	(Kenya) Kenedy Onyango	(Kenya) Kakamega Homeboyz	
27 October 2020	GK	(Kenya) Stephen Njunge	(Kenya) Wazito	
2 November 2020	LW	(Kenya) Rodgers Okumu	(Kenya) Coast Stima	
3 November 2020	LB	(Kenya) Herit Mungai	(Kenya) Posta Rangers	

=== Out ===
Date	Pos.	Player	To	Ref.
1 July 2020	GK	(Kenya) Ronny Kagunzi	Free agents	
1 July 2020	CB	(Kenya) Tedian Esilaba	Free agents	
1 July 2020	GK	(Kenya) Levis Opiyo	(Kenya) Gor Mahia	
1 July 2020	MF	(Kenya) Eric Ochieng	Mt Kenya United	
1 July 2020	LW	(Kenya) David Gateri	(Kenya) Bidco United	
1 July 2020	RB	(Kenya) Noah Abich	Retired	
1 August 2020	RB	(Kenya) Kevin Okumu	(Kenya) Wazito	

=== Loans out ===
==== offseason ====
Date	Until	Pos.	Player	To	Ref.
1 October 2020	August 2021	MF	(Kenya) Rowland Makati	(Kenya) Nairobi Stima F.C.	
1 October 2020	August 2021	MF	(Kenya) Ronney Kola	(Kenya) Nairobi Stima F.C.	

=== In ===
Date	Pos.	Player	From	Ref.
4 February 2021	LB	(Kenya) Bolton Omwenga	(Tanzania) Biashara United	
12 February 2021	RB	(Kenya) Kevin Okumu	(Kenya) Wazito	
18 March 2021	ST	(Kenya) Nicholas Kipkirui	(Kenya) Gor Mahia	

== Competitions ==
=== Overall record ===
Competition	First match	Last match	Starting round	Final position	Record							
Competition	First match	Last match	Starting round	Final position	Pld	W	D	L	GF	GA	GD	Win %
2020-21 KPL	28 Nov 2020	22 Aug 2021	Matchday 1	7th	32	12	9	11	34	30	+4	37.50
2020-21 Betway Cup	13 Feb 2021	10 Jun 2021	Round of 64	Quarter finals	4	3	0	1	7	3	+4	75.00
Total					36	15	9	12	41	33	+8	41.67

Source: rsssf

=== Premier League ===
==== Results summary ====
Overall								Home						Away					
Pld	W	D	L	GF	GA	GD	Pts	W	D	L	GF	GA	GD	W	D	L	GF	GA	GD
32	12	9	11	34	30	+4	45	7	5	4	23	17	+6	5	4	7	11	13	−2

Source: Soccerway

==== Results by round ====
Round	1	2	3	4	5	6	7	8	9	10	11	12	13	14	15	16	17	18	19	20	21	22	23	24	25	26	27	28	29	30	31	32	33	34
Ground	H	A	H	H	H	A	A	H	A	H	A	H	A	H	A	H	H	A	H	A	H	A	H	A	A	A	H	H	H	A	H	A	A	H
Result	W	L	W	D	D	L	D	D	L	L	L	-	W	W	L	D	L	W	W	W	W	W	L	D	W	D	D	L	W	W	L	D	-	L
Position	3	4	3	5	7	7	8	9	10	11	13	9	8	8	11	12	10	10	10	11	8	5	5	5	6	6	6	6	5	3	5	6	6	7
Points	3	3	6	7	8	8	9	10	10	10	10	10	13	16	16	17	17	20	23	26	29	32	32	33	36	37	38	38	41	44	44	45	45	45

Source: Soccerway
A = Away; H = Home; W = Win; D = Draw; L = Loss; P = Postponed

==== Score overview ====
Win Draw Loss

Opposition	Home score	Away score	Aggregate score	Double
AFC Leopards	2-1	0-1	2-2	No
Bandari	2-0	1-1	3-2	No
Bidco Utd	1-2	0-0	1-2	No
Gor Mahia	1-1	0-1	1-2	No
Kakamega Homeboyz	1-0	0-2	1-2	No
Kariobangi Sharks	1-2	2–1	3-3	No
KCB	0-3	0-1	0-4	No
Mathare United	2-0	0-2	2–2	No
Nzoia Sugar	2–0	1-0	3-0	Yes
Posta Rangers	2-2	1-1	3–3	No
Sofapaka	3-0	0-1	3-1	No
Tusker	2-2	1-0	3-2	No
Ulinzi Stars	1-1	2-0	3-2	No
Vihiga United	1-1	0-0	1-1	No
Wazito	0-1	1-2	1-3	No
Western Stima	2-1	2-0	4-1	Yes
Zoo FC	2-1	-	2-1	No

==== Matches ====
Win Draw Loss Fixtures

The tentative league fixtures were announced on 13 August 2020, but the actual ones were set out on the 23rd of November the same year.

29 November 2020 1	Nairobi City Stars	2-0	Nzoia Sugar	Narok
15:00 UTC+3	Muki 16'; Maloba 18'; Opiyo (yellow card) 53'	Report	Kasuti (penalty missed) 55'	Stadium: Narok Stadium; Referee: Hosea Omondi

4 December 2020 2	KCB	1-0	Nairobi City Stars	Kasarani
15:00 UTC+3	Onyango 43'; Ambulu (yellow card) 70'; Munala (yellow card) 90'	Report	Muki (yellow card) 35'	Stadium: Kasarani Annex; Referee: Andrew Juma
Note: Live on StarTimes

11 December 2020 3	Nairobi City Stars	2–0	Bandari	Kasarani
15:00 UTC+3	Onyango (yellow card) 45'; Aziz (yellow card) 45'; Muki 60'; Odhiambo 66' (o.g.)	Report		Stadium: Kasarani Annex
Note: Live on StarTimes

17 December 2020 4	Bidco United	0–0	Nairobi City Stars	Nairobi
15:00 UTC+3	Opiyo (yellow card) 29'	Report	Ochieng (yellow card) 72'	Stadium: Utalii Grounds; Referee: Collins Opiyo

23 December 2020 5	Nairobi City Stars	1-1	Vihiga United	Nairobi
15:00 UTC+3	Opiyo (yellow card) 45'; Sven 48'	Report	Simiyu 43'; Owino (yellow card) 52'; Adeyefa (yellow card) 69'; Odongo (yellow card) 86'	Stadium: Utalii Grounds; Referee: Meshack Omwami

3 January 2021 6	Wazito	2-1	Nairobi City Stars	Nairobi
15:00 UTC+3	Kimani 16', 40' (pen.); Isuza (yellow card) 23'; Omurwa (yellow card) 44'; Ng'ang'a (yellow card) 88'	Report	Herit (yellow card) 39'; Muki (yellow card) 55'; Opiyo 82' (pen.)	Stadium: Utalii Grounds; Referee: Collins Opiyo

8 January 2021 7	Posta Rangers	1-1	Nairobi City Stars	Nairobi
15:00 UTC+3	Dwang (yellow card) 35', (goal) 45'; Adira (yellow card) 53' (yellow-red card) 90+5'; Osok (yellow card) 81'	Report	Opiyo 54'	Stadium: Kasarani Annex; Referee: Peter Waweru

16 January 2021 8	Nairobi City Stars	1–1	Ulinzi Stars	Nairobi
15:00 UTC+3	Opiyo 19'; Herit (yellow card) 35'; Onyango (yellow card) 45'; Ombija (yellow card) 83'	Report	Juma 30' (pen.); Onyango (yellow card) 84'	Stadium: Utalii Grounds

23 January 2021 9	Sofapaka	1-0	Nairobi City Stars	Mwatate
15:00 UTC+3	Sifuna 73'	Report	Shitu (yellow card) 53'; Ombija (yellow card) 71'	Stadium: Wundayi Stadium; Referee: Broke Fide

30 January 2021 10	Nairobi City Stars	1–2	Kariobangi Sharks	Nairobi
15:00 UTC+3	Opiyo (yellow card) 10'; Agesa 35'; Wiked (yellow card) 71'	Report	Masaba 13'; Siwa (yellow card) 43'; Omoto (yellow card) 51'; Lwasa (yellow card) 69'; Kapaito 81'	Stadium: Kasarani Annex; Referee: Anthony Ogwayo

6 February 2021 11	Kakamega Homeboyz	2-0	Nairobi City Stars	Kakamega
15:00 UTC+3	Mwinyi 73'; Eshihanda (yellow card) 40' (yellow-red card) 83'; Okoth 90+3'	Report	Bolton (yellow card) 85'	Stadium: Bukhungu Stadium

20 February 2021 12	Nairobi City stars	2-1	Zoo Kericho	Nairobi
15:00 UTC+3	Kevin Okumu 33'; Ombija 80'	Report	Odongo 51'; Odhiambo (yellow card) 90'	Stadium: Kasarani Annex; Referee: Meshack Omondi

24 February 2021 13	Western Stima	0-2	Nairobi City Stars	Kisumu
15:00 UTC+3	Omondi 41'	Report	Ombija 37'; Opiyo 45' (pen.); Okuse (yellow card) 65'	Stadium: Moi Stadium; Referee: Brook Philip

2 March 2021 14	Nairobi City Stars	2-0	Mathare United	Nairobi
15:00 UTC+3	Omwenga 28' (yellow card) 90+1'; Okuse 90'	Report	Otieno 37'; Ogola 44'	Stadium: Kasarani Annex; Referee: Davis Malungo

2 March 2021 15	AFC Leopards	1-0	Nairobi City Stars	Nairobi
15:00 UTC+3	Hansel 90+4'; Kamura (red card) 59'; Austin (yellow card) 65'; Hansel (yellow card) 90+5'	Report	Opiyo (yellow card) 61'	Stadium: Kasarani Annex

20 March 2021 16	Nairobi City Stars	2-2	Tusker FC	Nairobi
15:00 UTC+3	Muki 9', 20' (yellow card) 38'; Ombija (yellow card) 53'; Shittu (yellow card) 89'	Report	Sempala (yellow card) 27'; Monyi 52'; Onyango 72'	Stadium: Utalii Grounds; Referee: Zacharia Ashira

16 May 2021 17	Gor Mahia	1-0	Nairobi City Stars	Nairobi
15:00 UTC+3	Karim 31'	Report	Okumu (yellow card) 26'; Agesa (yellow card) 47'; Shittu (yellow card) 67'; Ombija (red card) 76'	Stadium: Kasarani

24 May 2021 18	Nairobi City Stars	3-0	Sofapaka F.C.	Nairobi
15:00 UTC+3	Opiyo 3' (pen.); Agesa 16'; Bolton (yellow card) 34'; Shittu 37'; Muki (penalty missed) 52'; Sven (yellow card) 58' (yellow-red card) 84'	Report	Juma (penalty missed) 30'; Sifuna (yellow card) 36'; Aigba (red card) 45+1'	Stadium: Ruaraka

29 May 2021 19	Kariobangi Sharks	1-2	Nairobi City Stars	Nairobi
15:00 UTC+3	Mokaya (yellow card) 67'; Kajos (yellow card) 86'; Sakari 90+1' (pen.)	Report	Opiyo 57' (pen.); Maloba 76'	Stadium: Utalii Grounds

15 June 2021 20	Nairobi City Stars	2-1	Western Stima	Nairobi
15:00 UTC+3	Ombija (yellow card) 77' (goal) 86'; Opiyo 89' (pen.)	Report	Ouma 39'; Ogada (yellow card) 43'	Stadium: Ruaraka; Referee: Collins Opiyo

19 June 2021 21	Nairobi City Stars	1-0	Kakamega Homeboyz	Nairobi
15:00 UTC+3	Kipkirui 31'; Njunge (yellow card) 90+3'	Report	Omondi (yellow card) 10'; Owino (yellow card) 22'; Masinza (penalty missed) 46'	Stadium: Ruaraka; Referee: George Mwai

25 June 2021 22	Nzoia Sugar	0-1	Nairobi City Stars	Nairobi
15:00 UTC+3		Report	Okuse 87'	Stadium: Narok Stadium

30 June 2021 23	Nairobi City Stars	0-1	Wazito	Nairobi
15:00 UTC+3	Yida (yellow card) 58'	Report	Oburu (yellow card) 15'; Onyango (yellow card) 55'; Masika 62'	Stadium: Ruaraka

4 July 2021 24	Bandari	1-1	Nairobi City stars	Mombasa
15:00 UTC+3	Wadri 64' (pen.)	Report	Opiyo 47'; Okumu (yellow card) 90'	Stadium: Mbaraki

4 July 2021 25	Ulinzi Stars	0-2	Nairobi City Stars	Nakuru
15:00 UTC+3	Kago (yellow card) 56'	Report	Kipkirui 8'; Bolton 11'; Odera (yellow card) 38'; Muki (yellow card) 49'; Wiked (yellow card) 61'; Onyango (yellow card) 87'	Stadium: ASK Showground

17 July 2021 26	Nairobi City Stars	1-1	Gor Mahia	Nairobi
15:00 UTC+3	Okumu 22' (yellow card) 88'; Shittu (yellow card) 62'; Onyango (yellow card) 79'; Ouma (yellow card) 90'	Report	Wendo (yellow card) 50'; Ulimwengu 54'; Shakava (yellow card) 90+3'	Stadium: Kasarani

21 July 2021 27	Vihiga United	0-0	Nairobi City Stars	Nakuru
15:00 UTC+3		Report	Elvis (yellow card) 39'; Onyango (yellow card) 47'	Stadium: ASK Showground

26 July 2021 28	Nairobi City Stars	1-2	Bidco United	Nairobi
15:00 UTC+3	Otieno (yellow card) 24'; Okaka (yellow card) 39'; Odera 80' (pen.); Shittu (yellow card) 74' (red card) 90+4'	Report	Orem 28'; Simasi (yellow card) 62'; Gateri 64'; Adisa (yellow card) 70'; Akhulia (Coach) (red card) 88'; Lambert (red card) 90+4'	Stadium: Kasarani

30 July 2021 29	Tusker	0-1	Nairobi City Stars	Nairobi
15:00 UTC+3	Aloro (yellow card) 55'; Onyango (yellow card) 57'; Okoth (yellow card) 86'	Report	Odera 53' (yellow card) 59'; Onyango (yellow card) 69'; Njunge (yellow card) 71'	Stadium: Kasarani

3 August 2021 30	Nairobi City Stars	2-1	AFC Leopards	Nairobi
15:00 UTC+3	Odera 35' (yellow card) 36'; Okumu (yellow card) 44'; Muki (yellow card) 68'; Kipkirui 68'; Onyango (yellow card) 74'	Report	Munene 63'; Omondi (yellow card) 87'; Olilo (yellow card) 89'	Stadium: Ruaraka

7 August 2021 31	Mathare United	2-0	Nairobi City Stars	Nairobi
15:00 UTC+3	Alwanga 10'; Ndonye (yellow card) 56'; Otieno 70'; Mwangi (yellow card) 75'; Okelo (yellow card) 84'	Report	Buliba (yellow card) 15'	Stadium: Ruaraka

7 August 2021 32	Nairobi City Stars	2-2	Posta Rangers	Nairobi
15:00 UTC+3	Odera 13'; Kipkirui 90+5'	Report	Lokuwam 29'; Nambute 49'	Stadium: Ruaraka

22 August 2021 34	Nairobi City Stars	0-3	KCB FC	Narok
15:00 UTC+3		Report	Odhiambo 34'; Wekesa 70'; Omondi 89'	Stadium: Narok Stadium

=== Betway Cup ===
Win Draw Loss Fixtures

13 Feb 2021 Round of 64	Mutomo Tigers	1-4	Nairobi City Stars	Kitui
15:00 UTC+3	Mutuse 51'; Nzila (yellow card) 71'	Report	Ouma (yellow card) 43' (goal) 54'; Chale (red card) 65'; Sanneh 70', 78'; Okuse (yellow card) 84'; Agesa 85'	Stadium: Kitui; Referee: Samuel Mwaura

1 June 2021 Round of 32	Fortune FC	0–1	Nairobi City Stars	Kerugoya
15:00 UTC+3	Njeru (yellow card) 89'; Kisayi (yellow card) 90+5'	Report	Odera 23' (yellow card) 24'; Elvis (yellow card) 43'; Osano (yellow card) 67'; Maloba (yellow card) 88'	Stadium: Kianyanga

6 June 2021 Round of 16	Nairobi City Stars	2-0	Ulinzi Stars	Nairobi
15:00 UTC+3	Shittu (yellow card) 22'; Onyango (yellow card) 22'; Kipkirui 33'; Opiyo (yellow card) 41'; Agesa 46'; Muki (yellow card) 75'; Elvis (yellow card) 89'	Report		Stadium: Ruaraka

10 June 2021 Quarter finals	Bidco United	1-0	Nairobi City Stars	Nairobi
15:00 UTC+3	Orem 21'; Kalama (yellow card) 76'; Lambert (yellow card) 80'	Report	Onyango (yellow card) 16'; Agesa (yellow card) 16'	Stadium: Ruaraka

== Statistics ==
=== Appearances ===
No.	Pos.	Player	Premier League	Betway Cup	Total
1	GK	(Kenya) Elvis Ochoro	0	0	0
2	MF	(Kenya) Elvis Noor	25	2	27
3	MF	(Kenya) Charles Otieno	10	1	11
4	DF	(Kenya) Salim Abdalla	26	3	29
5	DF	(Kenya) Wesley Onguso	2	1	3
6	DF	(Kenya) Ronney Kola	0	0	0
7	FW	(Kenya) Rodgers Okumu	22	4	26
8	DF	(Kenya) Calvin Masawa	3	1	4
9	FW	(Kenya) Vincent Otieno	7	1	8
10	MF	(Kenya) Peter Opiyo	25	2	27
11	FW	(Kenya) Davis Agesa	27	4	31
12	DF	(Kenya) Edwin Buliba	8	1	9
14	MF	(Kenya) Rowland Makati	0	0	-
15	FW	(Kenya) John Kamau John	5	1	6
16	GK	(Kenya) Jacob Osano	0	2	2
17	FW	(Kenya) Nicholas Kipkirui	18	3	21
18	MF	(Kenya) Sven Yida	27	3	30
19	DF	(Kenya) Kevin Okumu	20	3	23
20	MF	(Kenya) Timothy Ouma	24	1	25
21	MF	(Kenya) Oliver Maloba	25	3	28
22	DF	(Kenya) Wycliffe Onyango	16	4	20
23	MF	(Kenya) Stephen Njunge	32	2	34
24	FW	(Kenya) Erick Ombija	27	4	31
25	DF	(Kenya) Kenedy Onyango	31	2	33
26	DF	(Kenya) Bolton Omwenga	22	3	25
27	MF	(Kenya) Aziz Okaka	12	1	13
28	DF	(Kenya) Herit Mungai	17	1	18
29	FW	(The Gambia) Ebrimah Sanneh	11	3	14
30	MF	(Kenya) Anthony Kimani	29	2	31
32	FW	(Kenya) Ezekiel Odera	24	3	25
Players who left the club
17	DF	(Uganda) Yusuf Mukisa	0	0	-
19	FW	(Uganda) Jimmy Bageya	2	0	2

Source: Nairobi City Stars

=== Goalscorers ===
No.	Pos.	Player	Premier League	Betway Cup	Total
10	FW	(Kenya) Peter Opiyo	8	0	8
32	FW	(Kenya) Ezekiel Odera	4	1	5
17	FW	(Kenya) Nicholas Kipkirui	4	1	5
30	MF	(Kenya) Anthony Kimani	4	0	4
11	FW	(Kenya) Davis Agesa	2	2	4
7	FW	(Kenya) Rodgers Okumu	2	0	2
24	FW	(Kenya) Erick Ombija	2	0	2
19	DF	(Kenya) Kevin Otieno	1	0	2
21	MF	(Kenya) Oliver Maloba	2	0	2
26	DF	(Kenya) Bolton Omwenga	2	0	2
29	FW	(The Gambia) Ebrimah Sanneh	0	2	2
4	DF	(Kenya) Salim Abdalla	1	0	1
18	FW	(Kenya) Sven Yida	1	0	1
20	MF	(Kenya) Timothy Ouma	0	1	1
Own goals			1	0	1
Totals			34	7	41

=== Top Assists ===
No.	Pos.	Player	Premier League	Betway Cup	Total
30	MF	(Kenya) Anthony Kimani	4	2	6
11	FW	(Kenya) Davis Agesa	5	0	5
26	DF	(Kenya) Bolton Omwenga	3	1	4
20	MF	(Kenya) Timothy Ouma	3	0	3
19	DF	(Kenya) Kevin Otieno	2	1	3
32	FW	(Kenya) Ezekiel Odera	2	1	3
7	FW	(Kenya) Rodgers Okumu	2	0	2
10	FW	(Kenya) Peter Opiyo	2	0	2
17	FW	(Kenya) Nicholas Kipkirui	2	0	2
18	MF	(Kenya) Sven Yida	1	1	2
21	FW	(Kenya) Erick Ombija	1	0	1
21	MF	(Kenya) Oliver Maloba	1	0	1
5	DF	(The Gambia) Wesley Onguso	0	1	1
22	DF	(Kenya) Wycliffe Onyango	1	0	1
25	DF	(Kenya) Kenedy Onyango	1	0	1
28	DF	(Kenya) Herit Mungai	1	0	1
2	MF	(Kenya) Elvis Noor	1	0	1
Opponent			1	0	1
Players who left the club
19	FW	(Uganda) Jimmy Bageya	1	0	1
Totals			34	7	41

Source: Nairobi City Stars

=== Clean sheets ===
Rank	No.	Pos.	Player	Premier League	Betway Cup	Total
1	16	GK	(Kenya) Stephen Njunge	11	1	12
2	23	GK	(Kenya) Jacob Osano	0	2	2
3	1	GK	(Kenya) Elvis Ochoro	0	0	0
Totals				11	3	14

=== Discipline ===
No.	Pos.	Player	Premier League			Betway Cup			Total		
No.	Pos.	Player	Booked	(yellow card) (yellow-red card)	Sent off (straight red)	Booked	(yellow card) (yellow-red card)	Sent off (straight red)	Booked	(yellow card) (yellow-red card)	Sent off (straight red)
1	GK	(Kenya) Elvis Ochoro	0	0	0	0	0	0	0	0	0
2	MF	(Kenya) Elvis Noor	1	0	0	2	0	0	3	0	0
3	MF	(Kenya) Charles Otieno	1	0	0	0	0	1	1	0	1
4	DF	(Kenya) Salim Abdalla	5	0	1	1	0	0	6	0	1
5	DF	(Kenya) Wesley Onguso	0	0	0	0	0	0	0	0	0
6	DF	(Kenya) Ronney Kola	0	0	0	0	0	0	0	0	0
7	FW	(Kenya) Rodgers Okumu	2	0	0	1	0	0	3	0	0
8	DF	(Kenya) Calvin Masawa	0	0	0	0	0	0	0	0	0
9	FW	(Kenya) Vincent Otieno	0	0	0	0	0	0	0	0	0
10	MF	(Kenya) Peter Opiyo	5	0	0	1	0	0	6	0	0
11	FW	(Kenya) Davis Agesa	1	0	0	2	0	0	3	0	0
12	DF	(Kenya) Edwin Buliba	1	0	0	0	0	0	1	0	0
14	MF	(Kenya) Rowland Makati	0	0	0	0	0	0	0	0	0
15	FW	(Kenya) John Kamau John	0	0	0	0	0	0	0	0	0
16	GK	(Kenya) Jacob Osano	0	0	0	1	0	0	1	0	0
17	FW	(Kenya) Nicholas Kipkirui	0	0	0	0	0	0	0	0	0
18	MF	(Kenya) Sven Yida	3	2	1	0	0	0	3	2	1
19	DF	(Kenya) Kevin Okumu	5	0	0	0	0	0	5	0	0
20	MF	(Kenya) Timothy Ouma	1	0	0	1	0	0	2	0	0
21	MF	(Kenya) Oliver Maloba	0	0	0	1	0	0	1	0	0
22	DF	(Kenya) Wycliffe Onyango	4	0	0	0	0	0	4	0	0
23	MF	(Kenya) Stephen Njunge	2	0	0	0	0	0	2	0	0
24	FW	(Kenya) Erick Ombija	4	2	1	0	0	0	4	2	1
25	DF	(Kenya) Kenedy Onyango	5	0	0	2	0	0	7	0	0
26	DF	(Kenya) Bolton Omwenga	3	0	0	0	0	0	3	0	0
27	MF	(Kenya) Aziz Okaka	2	0	0	0	0	0	2	0	0
28	DF	(Kenya) Herit Mungai	2	0	0	0	0	0	2	0	0
29	FW	(The Gambia) Ebrimah Sanneh	0	0	0	0	0	0	0	0	0
30	MF	(Kenya) Anthony Kimani	5	0	0	1	0	0	6	0	0
32	FW	(Kenya) Ezekiel Odera	4	0	0	1	0	0	5	0	0
Players who left the club
17	DF	(Uganda) Yusuf Mukisa	0	0	0	0	0	0	0	0	0
19	FW	(Uganda) Jimmy Bageya	0	0	0	0	0	0	0	0	0
Totals			56	4	3	13	0	1	69	4	4

Source: Nairobi City Stars

== Awards ==
=== Players ===
No.	Pos.	Player	Award	Source
26	LB	(Kenya) Bolton Omwenga	Defender of the Year mominee	
23	GK	(Kenya) Stephen Njunge	Runners-up Golden Glove winner	
	TM	(Kenya) Noah Abich	Runners-up Team Manager of the Year winner	
