= 2020–21 Kenyan Premier League =

Top-division Kenyan football season

FKF Premier League
- Season: 2020-21
- Dates: 28 November 2020 - 22 August 2021
- Matches: 272
- Goals: 598 (2.2 per match)
- Top goalscorer: (Kenya) Erick Kapaito (24 goals)
- Biggest home win: Bandari 5-0 Vihiga United (23 February 2021)
- Biggest away win: Vihiga United 0-4 Tusker (30 May 2021)
- Highest scoring: Western Stima 2-5 Tusker (12 December 2020); Kariobangi Sharks 4-3 Gor Mahia (10 January 2021); Bandari 4-3 Kakamega Homeboyz (16 January 2021)
- Longest winning run: 7 matches Tusker
- Longest unbeaten run: 12 matches Tusker
- Longest winless run: 11 matches Zoo
- Longest losing run: 7 matches Zoo

The 2020–21 FKF Premier League (referred to as the BetKing Premier League for sponsorship reasons) was the 18th season of Kenyan Premier League since it began in 2003, and the 58th season of top-division football in Kenya since 1963.

== Team changes ==
The following teams have changed division since the 2019–20 season.

=== To Premier League ===
==== Promoted from Super League ====
- Nairobi City Stars
- Vihiga United F.C.

=== From Premier League ===
==== Relegated from Premier League ====
- Kisumu All Stars
- Chemelil

==== Expelled from the KPL ====
- Sony Sugar

== Stadiums ==
Team	Location	Stadium	Capacity
AFC Leopards	Nairobi	Nyayo Stadium	30,000
Bandari	Mombasa	Mombasa Municipal Stadium	10,000
Bidco	Thika	Del Monte Grounds Stadium	20,000
Gor Mahia	Nairobi	City Stadium	15,000
Kakamega Homeboyz	Kakamega	Bukhungu Stadium	5,000
Kariobangi Sharks	Machakos	Kenyatta Stadium	5,000
Kenya Commercial Bank	Nairobi	City Stadium	15,000
Mathare United	Nairobi	MISC Kasarani	60,000
Nairobi City Stars	Nairobi	Hope Centre	5,000
Nzoia Sugar	Bungoma	Kanduyi Stadium	5,000
Posta Rangers	Eldoret	Kipchoge Keino Stadium	10,000
Sofapaka	Machakos	Kenyatta Stadium	5,000
Tusker	Meru	Kinoru Stadium	10,000
Ulinzi	Nakuru	Afraha Stadium	8,200
Vihiga United	Kakamega	Bukhungu Stadium	5,000
Wazito	Machakos	Kenyatta Stadium	5,000
Western Stima	Kakamega	Bukhungu Stadium	5,000
Zoo Kericho	Kericho	Green Stadium	3,000

== Personnel and sponsoring ==
Team	Manager	Kit Manufacturer	Sponsor
AFC Leopards	(Belgium) Patrick Aussems	Umbro	Betsafe
Bandari	(Uganda) Mbungo Casa André	Uhlsport	Kenya Ports Authority
Bidco	(Kenya) Anthony Akhulia	Uhlsport	Noodies
Gor Mahia	(England) Mark Harrison	Macron	Betsafe
Kakamega Homeboyz	(Kenya) Nicholas Muyoti	Select Sport	Mozzart Bet
Kariobangi Sharks	(Kenya) William Muluya	Umbro	Betway
Kenya Commercial Bank	(Kenya) Zedekiah Otieno		KCB
Mathare United	(Kenya) Frank Ouna		Triple5Bet
Nairobi City Stars	Vacant	Puma	Jonathan Jackson Foundation
Nzoia Sugar	(Kenya) Ibrahim Shikanda	Givova	Nzoia Sugar
Posta Rangers	(Kenya) Stanley Okumbi		
Sofapaka	(Kenya) Kennedy Odhiambo	Adidas	Betika
Tusker	(Kenya) Robert Matano		Tusker
Ulinzi	(Kenya) Benjamin Nyangweso	Uhlsport	KDF
Vihiga United	(Kenya) Sammy Okoth		Vihiga County
Wazito	(Kenya) Francis Kimanzi		Adios Kuneen
Western Stima	(Kenya) Juma Abdalla	Givova	
Zoo Kericho	(Kenya) Herman Iswekha		

== Managerial changes ==
Team	Outgoing Manager	Manner Of Departure	Date of Vacancy	Position In Table	Incoming Manager	Date Of Appointment
Wazito F.C.	(England) Stewart Hall	Resigned	6 July 2020	Pre-season	(Kenya) Fred Ambani	8 August 2020
Gor Mahia	(Finland) Steven Polack	Mutual Consent	9 October 2020	Pre-season	(Brazil) Roberto Oliviera Gonclaves	10 October 2020
AFC Leopards	(Kenya) Anthony Kimani	Stepped Down		Pre-season	(Czech Republic) Tomáš Trucha	2 November 2020
Wazito	(Kenya) Fred Ambani	Sacked	9 November 2020	Pre-season	(Kenya) Francis Kimanzi	19 November 2020
AFC Leopards	(Czech Republic) Tomáš Trucha	Resigned	2 December 2020	4th	(Belgium) Patrick Aussems	9 February 2021
Gor Mahia	(Brazil) Roberto Oliviera Gonclaves	Mutual Consent	12 December 2020	14th	(Portugal) Carlos Manuel Vaz Pinto	10 January 2021
Sofapaka	(Kenya) John Baraza	Sacked	15 December 2020	10th	(Kenya) Kennedy Odhiambo	17 December 2020
Bandari	(Kenya) Kennedy Odhiambo	Signed By Sofapaka	17 December 2020	8th	(Uganda) Mbungo Casa André	4 January 2021
Nzoia Sugar	Vacant				(Kenya) Ibrahim Shikanda	6 January 2021
Western Stima	(Kenya) Paul Ogai	Sacked	1 February 2021	16th	(Kenya) Abdalla Juma	2 February 2021
Posta Rangers	(Kenya) Sammy Omollo	Sacked	4 February 2021	14th	(Kenya) Stanley Okumbi	8 February 2021
Mathare United	(Kenya) Salim Ali	Sacked	18 May 2021	17th	(Kenya) Frank Ouna	18 May 2021
Gor Mahia	(Portugal) Carlos Manuel Vaz Pinto	Mutual Consent	10 July 2021	6th	(England) Mark Harrison	3 August 2021
Nairobi City Stars	(Bosnia and Herzegovina) Sanjin Alagić	Contract end	18 July 2021	9th	Vacant	

== League table ==
Pos	Team	Pld	W	D	L	GF	GA	GD	Pts	Promotion, qualification or relegation
1	Tusker (C)	32	19	8	5	52	26	+26	65	Qualifies for CAF Champions League preliminary round
2	KCB	32	18	8	6	44	23	+21	62	
3	Bandari	32	14	11	7	47	37	+10	53	
4	AFC Leopards	32	15	6	11	37	31	+6	48 (Note: As a result of the missed game between AFC Leopards and Gor Mahia the team was given a 3 point deduction and a Ksh. Ten Million fine.)	
5	Kariobangi Sharks	32	14	6	12	45	42	+3	48	
6	Kakamega Homeboyz	32	14	4	14	45	39	+6	46	
7	Nairobi City Stars	32	12	9	11	34	30	+4	45	
8	Gor Mahia	32	14	6	12	32	39	−7	45 (Note: As a result of the missed game between AFC Leopards and Gor Mahia the team was given a 3 point deduction and a Ksh. Ten Million fine.)	
9	Wazito	32	12	9	11	30	33	−3	45	
10	Ulinzi	32	11	11	10	29	29	0	44	
11	Bidco	32	10	14	8	28	28	0	44	
12	Sofapaka	32	9	11	12	34	37	−3	38	
13	Posta Rangers	32	7	15	10	25	33	−8	36	
14	Nzoia Sugar	32	7	12	13	33	38	−5	33	
15	Mathare United	32	8	6	18	32	47	−15	30	
16	Vihiga United	32	6	8	18	20	43	−23	26	Relegation Play-Offs
17	Western Stima (R)	32	4	10	18	31	57	−26	22	Releged to Kenyan National Super League
18	Zoo Kericho (R)	0	0	0	0	0	0	0	0	Relegated to FKF Division One League

Updated to match(es) played on 22 August 2021. Source:
Rules for classification: 1) Points; 2) Goal difference; 3) Number of goals scored; 4) Head-to-head results; 5) Wins; 6) Away goals; 7) Penalty points (sec 9.5); 8) 12-point sending off offences
(C) Champions; (R) Relegated

== Results ==
Home \ Away	AFC	BAN	BID	GOR	KAK	SHA	KCB	MAT	NAI	NZO	POS	SOF	TUS	ULI	VIH	WAZ	STI	ZOO
AFC Leopards	—	2–0	1–3	ABD	2–3	0–1	2–1	1–0	1–0	1–0	2–1	3–0	2–1	1–0	3–1	0–1	0–2	
Bandari	2–1	—	1–1	1–3	4–3	4–1	1–2	3–0	1–1	1–1	1–0	1–0	2–1	1–3	5–0	2–0	2–0	
Bidco	0–2	2–2	—	1–3	1–1	1–0	0–1	2–1	0–0	1–1	1–0	0–0	2–1	1–1	1–0	1–2	1–0	
Gor Mahia	0–0	0–0	1–1	—	1–0	0–2	0–2	3–1	1–0	0–2	0–1	1–0	1–2	1–0	0–1	0–0	1–2	
Kakamega Homeboyz	1–2	1–2	2–0	1–2	—	4–1	0–0	4–2	2–0	0–0	1–1	1–0	0–1	3–1	1–3	0–1	4–0	
Kariobangi Sharks	0–2	0–1	2–2	4–3	1–0	—	0–3	2–3	1–2	3–1	0–0	0–0	0–1	0–0	4–0	4–0	2–2	
KCB	1–1	3–0	1–0	0–0	2–0	0–3	—	1–0	1–0	2–1	0–2	1–0	2–2	2–1	1–0	1–0	3–1	
Mathare United	1–0	0–0	0–1	1–0	1–2	1–2	1–2	—	2–0	1–0	1–2	2–1	0–0	1–0	0–0	1–1	1–1	
Nairobi City Stars	2–1	2–0	1–2	1–1	1–0	1–2	0–3	2–0	—	2–0	2–2	3–0	2–2	1–1	1–1	0–1	2–1	
Nzoia Sugar	2–2	4–1	1–0	2–1	1–2	0–0	2–1	2–2	0–1	—	1–1	2–1	0–0	1–1	1–2	2–1	1–1	
Posta Rangers F.C.	0–0	1–1	0–0	0–1	1–3	0–3	0–3	2–0	1–1	0–0	—	1–2	1–4	0–0	2–1	0–0	0–0	
Sofapaka	1–0	2–2	0–0	1–2	1–2	1–2	2–2	4–2	1–0	1–0	1–1	—	1–2	0–0	1–1	2–0	3–1	
Tusker	2–0	0–0	2–1	2–1	2–0	4–2	0–0	1–0	0–1	2–1	0–1	1–1	—	1–0	1–0	2–0	2–1	
Ulinzi	0–1	0–2	0–0	1–0	2–0	2–0	0–0	2–1	0–2	1–0	2–1	2–0	1–4	—	0–0	2–1	2–2	
Vihiga United	0–0	0–1	0–1	0–1	0–1	0–1	2–1	1–2	0–0	2–1	0–1	1–1	0–4	1–2	—	0–2	0–0	
Wazito	1–2	2–2	1–1	0–1	1–0	2–0	1–1	2–1	2–1	2–1	1–1	0–3	1–1	0–0	3–1	—	1–0	
Western Stima	3–2	1–1	0–0	1–3	2–3	1–2	0–2	2–5	0–2	2–2	1–1	0–1	2–5	1–2	0–2	1–0	—	
Zoo Kericho																		—

Updated to match(es) played on 29 January 2021. Source:
Legend: Blue = home team win; Yellow = draw; Red = away team win.
For upcoming matches, an "a" indicates there is an article about the rivalry between the two participants.

== Season statistics ==
=== Top scorers ===
As of 22 August 2021

Rank	Player	Club	Goals
1	(Kenya) Erick Kapaito	Kariobangi Sharks	24
2	(Kenya) Elvis Rupia	AFC Leopards	17
3	(Kenya) Lawrence Juma	Sofapaka	16
4	(Uganda) William Wadri	Bandari	13
5	(Kenya) Derrick Otanga	Kenya Commercial Bank	12
6	(Kenya) Henry Meja	Tusker	11
7	(Burundi) Jules Ulimwengu	Gor Mahia	9
8	(Kenya) Mwinyi Shami Kibwana	Kakamega Homeboyz	8
8	(Kenya) Peter Opiyo	Nairobi City Stars	8
8	(Kenya) Kevin Kimani	Wazito	8
8	(Kenya) Jackson Macharia	Tusker	8
8	(Kenya) Daniel Otieno	Mathare United	8

=== Hat-tricks ===
Player	For	Against	Result	Date
(Kenya) Elvis Rupia	AFC Leopards	Sofapaka	3–0	12 December 2020
(Kenya) Lawrence Juma	Sofapaka	Mathare United	4-2	9 January 2021
(Kenya) Mwinyi Shami Kibwana	Kakamega Homeboyz	Kariobangi Sharks	4-1	31 July 2021

==== Notes ====
^{4} Player scored 4 goals

=== Clean sheets ===
Rank	Player	Club	Clean Sheets
1	(Kenya) James Saruni	Ulinzi Stars	12
2	(Kenya) Stephen Njunge	Nairobi City Stars	11
2	(Kenya) Joseph Okoth	KCB	11
3	(Uganda) Benjamin Ochan	AFC Leopards	10
3	(Rwanda) Emery Mvuyekure	Tusker F.C.	10
3	(Burundi) Justin Ndikumana	Bandari	10
