= 2018 Kenyan Premier League =

Kenyan Premier League
- Season: 2018
- Champions: Gor Mahia
- Matches: 306
- Goals: 711 (2.32 per match)
- Top goalscorer: (Kenya) Erick Kapaito (16 goals)

The 2018 Kenyan Premier League (known as the SportPesa Premier League for sponsorship reasons) was the 15th season of the Kenyan Premier League since it began in 2003, and the 55th season of top-division football in Kenya since 1963. It began on 3 February and ended on 7 October. Gor Mahia were the champions.

== Changes from last season ==
Locations of the 2018 Kenyan Premier League teams.
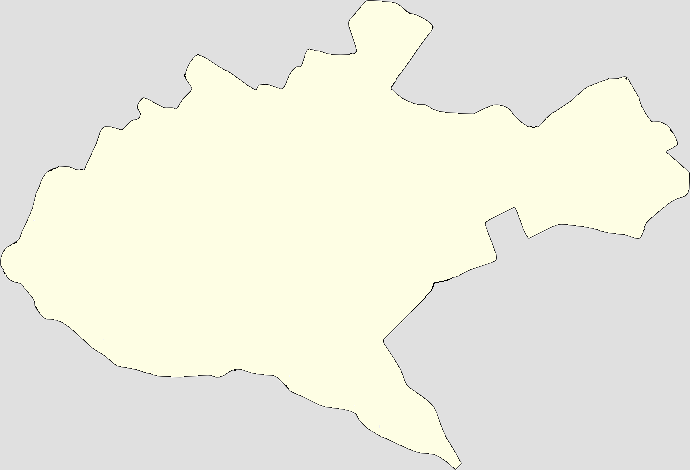
Locations of the 2018 Kenyan Premier League teams within Nairobi.

Relegated from Premier League

- Muhoroni Youth
- Western Stima

Promoted from National Super League

- Vihiga United
- Wazito

== Teams ==
Seven of the participating teams were based in the capital, Nairobi, while Bandari was the only team based on the Coast.

=== Stadia and locations ===
Team	Location	Stadium	Capacity
A.F.C. Leopards	Nairobi	Nyayo National Stadium	30,000
Bandari	Mombasa	Mombasa Municipal Stadium	10,000
Chemelil Sugar	Chemelil	Chemelil Sports Complex	5,000
Gor Mahia	Nairobi	Nairobi City Stadium	15,000
Kakamega Homeboyz	Kakamega	Bukhungu Stadium	10,000
Kariobangi Sharks	Nairobi	Nairobi City Stadium	15,000
Mathare United	Nairobi	Kasarani Stadium	60,000
Nakumatt	Nairobi	Nyayo National Stadium	30,000
Nzoia Sugar	Mumias	Mumias Sports Complex	10,000
Posta Rangers	Eldoret	Kipchoge Keino Stadium	10,000
Sofapaka	Nairobi	Nyayo National Stadium	30,000
Sony Sugar	Awendo	Awendo Green Stadium	5,000
Thika United	Thika	Thika Municipal Stadium	5,000
Tusker	Nairobi	Kasarani Stadium	60,000
Ulinzi Stars	Nakuru	Afraha Stadium	8,200
Vihiga	Vihiga	Kidundu Stadium	5,000
Wazito	Nairobi	Statehouse Primary School	5,000
Zoo Kericho	Kericho	Kericho Green Stadium	5,000

== League table ==
Pos	Team	Pld	W	D	L	GF	GA	GD	Pts	Qualification or relegation
1	Gor Mahia	34	23	6	5	71	31	+40	75	Qualification to 2018–19 CAF Champions League
2	Bandari	34	17	11	6	40	20	+20	62	
3	Tusker	34	16	8	10	47	35	+12	56	
4	Ulinzi Stars	34	15	9	10	38	26	+12	54	
5	Sofapaka	34	15	8	11	45	41	+4	53	
6	Kariobangi Sharks	34	13	12	9	48	40	+8	51	Qualification for the 2018–19 CAF Confederation Cup
7	AFC Leopards	34	14	9	11	47	48	−1	51	
8	Mathare United	34	11	15	8	47	45	+2	48	
9	SoNy Sugar	34	12	9	13	33	30	+3	45	
10	Kakamega Homeboyz	34	12	8	14	35	44	−9	44	
11	Zoo Kericho	34	10	12	12	42	48	−6	42	
12	Vihiga United	34	10	11	13	29	30	−1	41	
13	Nzoia Sugar	34	11	8	15	35	38	−3	41	
14	Chemelil Sugar	34	9	12	13	24	28	−4	39	
15	Posta Rangers	34	9	11	14	27	37	−10	38	
16	Nakumatt	34	9	10	15	49	61	−12	37	Relegation play-off
17	Wazito	34	8	7	19	31	53	−22	31	Relegation to National Super League
18	Thika United	34	5	8	21	23	56	−33	23	Relegation to National Super League

Source: Kenyan Premier League; soccervista.com
Rules for classification: 1) points; 2) goal difference; 3) goals scored; 4) playoff

=== Positions by round ===
The table lists the positions of teams after each week of matches. In order to preserve chronological evolvements, any postponed matches are not included to the round at which they were originally scheduled, but added to the full round they were played immediately afterwards. For example, if a match is scheduled for matchday 13, but then postponed and played between days 16 and 17, it will be added to the standings for day 16.

Team ╲ Round	1	2	3	4	5	6	7	8	9	10	11	12	13	14	15	16	17	18	19	20	21	22	23	24	25	26	27	28	29	30	31	32	33	34
Gor Mahia																																		
Sofapaka																																		
Bandari																																		
AFC Leopards																																		
Ulinzi Stars																																		
Mathare United																																		
Kariobangi Sharks																																		
Tusker																																		
Kakamega Homeboyz																																		
Posta Rangers																																		
Nzoia Sugar																																		
Nakumatt																																		
SoNy Sugar																																		
Zoo Kericho																																		
Chemelil Sugar																																		
Vihiga United																																		
Thika United																																		
Wazito																																		

Leader
Relegation to the 2018 Kenyan National Super League

Source: Futaa.com

== Results ==
Home \ Away	AFC	BND	CHM	GOR	KHB	KBS	MAU	NKM	NZS	PRN	SOF	SNY	THU	TUS	ULS	VIH	WAZ	ZOO
A.F.C. Leopards				–														
Bandari																		
Chemelil Sugar																		
Gor Mahia	–																	
Kakamega Homeboyz																		
Kariobangi Sharks																		
Mathare United																		
Nakumatt																		
Nzoia Sugar																		
Posta Rangers																		
Sofapaka																		
SoNy Sugar																		
Thika United																		
Tusker																		
Ulinzi Stars																		
Vihiga																		
Wazito																		
Zoo Kericho																		

Updated to match(es) played on unknown. Source: Soccerway
Legend: Blue = home team win; Yellow = draw; Red = away team win.

== Top scorers ==
Rank	Player	Club	Goals
1	(Kenya) Erick Kapaito	Kariobangi Sharks	16
2	(Kenya) Elvis Rupia	Nzoia Sugar	15
2	(Rwanda) Jacques Tuyisenge	Gor Mahia	15
4	(Kenya) Clifford Alwanga	Mathare United	13
4	(Kenya) Nicholas Kipkirui	Zoo	13
4	(Kenya) Cliff Nyakeya	Mathare United	13
4	(Kenya) Timothy Otieno	Tusker	13
8	(Kenya) Wyvonne Isuza	Leopards	12
8	(Kenya) Michael Madoya	Zoo	12
8	(Kenya) Ezekiel Odera	Leopards	12

=== Hat-tricks ===
Player	For	Against	Score	Date
(Rwanda) Meddie Kagere	Gor Mahia	Mount Kenya Utd	4-0	3 February 2018
(Kenya) Elvis Rupia	Nzoia Sugar	Kakamega	3-1	3 March 2018
(Kenya) Erick Kapaito	Kariobangi Sharks	Wazito	1-4	4 March 2018
(Kenya) Philip Wanjala	Chemelil	Mount Kenya Utd	1-4	11 March 2018
(Kenya) Erick Kapaito	Kariobangi Sharks	Mount Kenya Utd	2-5	15 September 2018

== See also ==
- 2018 FKF President's Cup
