= 2021–22 FKF Premier League =

Top-division Kenyan football season

FKF Premier League
- Season: 2021-22
- Dates: 25 September 2021 - 12 June 2022
- Champions: Tusker
- Matches: 304
- Goals: 672 (2.21 per match)
- Top goalscorer: (Kenya) Clifton Miheso (15 goals)
- Biggest home win: Posta Rangers 4-0 Vihiga United (15 October 2021); Nairobi City Stars 4:0 Vihiga United (6 November 2021); Kenya Police 4:0 Vihiga United (4 January 2022); Kakamega Homeboyz 4:0 Ulinzi Stars (2 April 2022)
- Biggest away win: Mathare United 0-6 Kariobangi Sharks (31 October 2021)
- Highest scoring: Kakamega Homeboyz 4-4 Nairobi City Stars (20 January 2022)
- Longest winning run: 5 matches Bandari (23 April 2022 - 22 May 2022); Kenya Police (15 May 2022 - 12 June 2022)
- Longest unbeaten run: 22 matches Tusker (20 January 2022 - 12 June 2022)
- Longest winless run: 17 matches Mathare United (12 February 2022 - 12 June 22)
- Longest losing run: 13 matches Mathare United (13 March 2022 - 12 June 2022)

The 2021–22 FKF Premier League was the 19th season of Kenyan Premier League since it began in 2003, and the 59th season of top-division football in Kenya since 1963.

== Team changes ==
The following teams have changed division since the 2020–21 season.

=== To Premier League ===
==== Promoted from Super League ====
- F.C. Talanta
- Administration Police F.C.

=== From Premier League ===
==== Relegated from Premier League ====
- Western Stima F.C.
- Zoo Kericho F.C.

== Stadiums ==
| Team | Location | Stadium | Capacity |
|---|---|---|---|
| AFC Leopards | Nairobi | Nyayo Stadium | 30,000 |
| Bandari | Mombasa | Mombasa Municipal Stadium | 10,000 |
| Bidco | Thika | Del Monte Grounds Stadium | 20,000 |
| F.C. Talanta | Nairobi | Ruaraka Stadium | 4,000 |
| Gor Mahia | Nairobi | City Stadium | 15,000 |
| Kakamega Homeboyz | Kakamega | Bukhungu Stadium | 5,000 |
| Kariobangi Sharks | Machakos | Kenyatta Stadium | 5,000 |
| Kenya Commercial Bank | Nairobi | City Stadium | 15,000 |
| Mathare United | Nairobi | MISC Kasarani | 60,000 |
| Nairobi City Stars | Nairobi | Hope Centre | 5,000 |
| Nzoia Sugar | Bungoma | Kanduyi Stadium | 5,000 |
| Police | Nairobi | Nyayo National Stadium | 30,000 |
| Posta Rangers | Eldoret | Kipchoge Keino Stadium | 10,000 |
| Sofapaka | Machakos | Kenyatta Stadium | 5,000 |
| Tusker | Nairobi | Ruaraka Stadium | 4,000 |
| Ulinzi | Nakuru | Afraha Stadium | 8,200 |
| Vihiga United | Kakamega | Bukhungu Stadium | 5,000 |
| Wazito | Machakos | Kenyatta Stadium | 5,000 |

== Personnel and sponsoring ==
| Team | Manager | Kit Manufacturer | Sponsor |
|---|---|---|---|
| AFC Leopards | (Belgium) Patrick Aussems | Umbro | Betsafe |
| Bandari | (Rwanda) Mbungo Casa André | Uhlsport | Kenya Ports Authority |
| Bidco | (Kenya) Anthony Akhulia | Uhlsport | Noodies |
| F.C. Talanta | (Kenya) Ken Kenyatta | | Communication Authority of Kenya |
| Gor Mahia | (Germany) Andreas Spier | Macron | Betsafe |
| Kakamega Homeboyz | (Kenya) Bernard Mwalala | Select Sport | Mozzart Bet |
| Kariobangi Sharks | (Kenya) William Muluya | Umbro | Betway |
| Kenya Commercial Bank | (Kenya) Zedekiah Otieno | | KCB |
| Mathare United | (Kenya) Frank Ouna | | Triple5Bet |
| Nairobi City Stars | (Kenya) Nicholas Muyoti | Puma | Jonathan Jackson Foundation |
| Nzoia Sugar | (Kenya) Peter Gin (interim) | Givova | Nzoia Sugar |
| Police FC | (Kenya) John “Bobby” Ogolla | | |
| Posta Rangers | (Kenya) Salim Ali (interim) | | |
| Sofapaka | (Kenya) David Odhiambo (interim) | Adidas | Betika |
| Tusker | (Kenya) Robert Matano | | Tusker |
| Ulinzi | (Kenya) Benjamin Nyangweso | Uhlsport | KDF |
| Vihiga United | (Kenya) Sammy Okoth | | Vihiga County |
| Wazito | (Kenya) Fred Ambani (interim) | | Adios Kuneen |

== Managerial changes ==
| Team | Outgoing Manager | Manner Of Departure | Date of Vacancy | Position In Table | Incoming Manager | Date Of Appointment |
|---|---|---|---|---|---|---|
| Kakamega Homeboyz | (Kenya) Nicholas Muyoti | End of Contract | 30 August 2021 | Pre-season | (Kenya) Bernard Mwalala | 30 August 2021 |
| Nairobi City Stars | Vacant | | | Pre-season | (Kenya) Nicholas Muyoti | 17 September 2021 |
| Nzoia Sugar | (Kenya) Ibrahim Shikanda | Sacked | 7 January 2022 | 15th | (Kenya) Peter Gin (interim) | 7 January 2022 |
| Wazito | (Kenya) Francis Kimanzi | Sacked | 13 January 2022 | 16th | (Kenya) Fred Ambani (interim) | 13 January 2022 |
| Gor Mahia F.C. | (England) Mark Harrison | Sacked | 29 January 2022 | 5th | (Uganda) Paul Nkata (interim) | 29 January 2022 |
| Gor Mahia F.C. | (Uganda) Paul Nkata (interim) | Mutual Consent | 1 February 2022 | 5th | (Germany) Andreas Spier | 1 January 2022 |
| Posta Rangers | (Kenya) Stanley Okumbi | Resigned | 7 February 2022 | 6th | (Kenya) Salim Ali (interim) | 10 February 2022 |
| Sofapaka | (Kenya) Ken Odhiambo | Mutual Consent | 30 March 2022 | 13th | (Kenya) David Odhiambo (interim) | 30 March 2022 |

== League table ==
| Pos | Team | Pld | W | D | L | GF | GA | GD | Pts | Promotion, qualification or relegation |
|---|---|---|---|---|---|---|---|---|---|---|
| 1 | Tusker (C) | 34 | 19 | 9 | 6 | 42 | 17 | +25 | 66 | Qualification to CAF Champions League qualifying first round |
| 2 | Kakamega Homeboyz | 34 | 18 | 12 | 4 | 54 | 33 | +21 | 66 | |
| 3 | Gor Mahia | 34 | 15 | 13 | 6 | 38 | 29 | +9 | 58 | |
| 4 | Bandari | 34 | 15 | 12 | 7 | 42 | 26 | +16 | 57 | |
| 5 | Nairobi City Stars | 34 | 14 | 10 | 10 | 45 | 34 | +11 | 52 | |
| 6 | AFC Leopards | 33 | 12 | 13 | 8 | 42 | 35 | +7 | 49 | |
| 7 | KCB | 34 | 12 | 13 | 9 | 40 | 33 | +7 | 49 | |
| 8 | Sofapaka | 33 | 12 | 13 | 8 | 32 | 26 | +6 | 49 | |
| 9 | Police United | 34 | 11 | 14 | 9 | 44 | 35 | +9 | 47 | |
| 10 | Kariobangi Sharks | 34 | 12 | 9 | 13 | 44 | 39 | +5 | 45 | |
| 11 | Posta Rangers | 34 | 12 | 8 | 14 | 44 | 41 | +3 | 44 | |
| 12 | Talanta | 34 | 11 | 11 | 12 | 39 | 43 | −4 | 44 | |
| 13 | Ulinzi | 32 | 10 | 13 | 9 | 21 | 22 | −1 | 43 | |
| 14 | Nzoia Sugar | 34 | 7 | 16 | 11 | 36 | 39 | −3 | 37 | |
| 15 | Bidco | 34 | 8 | 12 | 14 | 32 | 40 | −8 | 36 | |
| 16 | Wazito | 34 | 9 | 7 | 18 | 34 | 50 | −16 | 34 | Qualification for relegation play-offs |
| 17 | Vihiga United (R) | 34 | 6 | 9 | 19 | 25 | 58 | −33 | 27 | Relegation to Kenyan National Super League |
| 18 | Mathare United (Note: Mathare United was suspended by league after round 25, their remaining matches were awarded 2–0 wins to the opponents.) (R) | 34 | 3 | 2 | 29 | 18 | 72 | −54 | 11 | Relegation to Kenyan National Super League |

Rules for classification: 1) Points; 2) Goal difference; 3) Number of goals scored; 4) Head-to-head results; 5) Wins; 6) Away goals; 7) Penalty points (sec 9.5); 8) 12-point sending off offences
(C) Champions; (R) Relegated

== Results ==
| Home \ Away | AFC | BAN | BID | TAL | GOR | KAK | SHA | KCB | MAT | NAI | NZO | POL | POS | SOF | TUS | ULI | VIH | WAZ |
|---|---|---|---|---|---|---|---|---|---|---|---|---|---|---|---|---|---|---|
| AFC Leopards | — | 2–0 | 1–3 | | a | 2–3 | 0–1 | 2–1 | 1–0 | 1–0 | 1–0 | 0–2 | 2–1 | 3–0 | 2–1 | 1–0 | 3–1 | 0–1 |
| Bandari | 2–1 | — | | 3–0 | 1–1 | 2–1 | 1–1 | 0–0 | 3–0 | | | 0–0 | 2–0 | | 0–2 | 1–0 | | 0–1 |
| Bidco | 0–2 | 2–2 | — | | 1–3 | 1–1 | 1–0 | 0–1 | 2–1 | 0–0 | 1–1 | | 1–0 | 0–0 | 2–1 | 1–1 | 1–0 | 1–2 |
| F.C. Talanta | | | | — | | | | | | | | | | | | | | 1–1 |
| Gor Mahia | a | | | | — | | | 1–1 | | | | | | | | | | |
| Kakamega Homeboyz | 1–2 | 1–2 | 2–0 | | 1–2 | — | 4–1 | 0–0 | 4–2 | 2–0 | 0–0 | | 1–1 | 1–0 | 0–1 | 3–1 | 1–3 | 0–1 |
| Kariobangi Sharks | 0–2 | 0–1 | 2–2 | | 4–3 | 1–0 | — | 0–3 | 2–3 | 1–2 | 3–1 | | 0–0 | 0–0 | 0–1 | 0–0 | 4–0 | 4–0 |
| KCB | | | 1–0 | 1–1 | | 2–0 | 0–3 | — | | 1–0 | | | | | | | 1–0 | 1–0 |
| Mathare United | | 0–0 | | 2–0 | | 1–2 | 1–2 | | — | | 1–0 | | | | | | | 1–1 |
| Nairobi City Stars | | 2–0 | | 2–1 | | | 1–2 | | 2–0 | — | 2–0 | | | | 2–2 | 1–1 | 1–1 | |
| Nzoia Sugar | | | | | 2–1 | | 0–0 | 2–1 | | | — | | 1–1 | 2–1 | | 1–1 | | |
| Police | | | | | | | | | | | | — | | | | | | |
| Posta Rangers F.C. | | 1–1 | | | | | | 0–3 | 2–0 | 1–1 | | | — | 1–2 | 1–4 | 0–0 | | 0–0 |
| Sofapaka | | | 0–0 | 2–0 | | | 1–2 | 2–2 | 4–2 | 1–0 | | | | — | | | | |
| Tusker | | 0–0 | | | 2–1 | | 4–2 | | 1–0 | | 2–1 | | | 1–1 | — | 1–0 | 1–0 | 1–0 |
| Ulinzi | | 0–2 | 0–0 | | | 2–0 | | 0–0 | 2–1 | | | | | 2–0 | | — | 0–0 | |
| Vihiga United | | | 0–0 | | | | | | | | | | | | | | — | |
| Wazito | | 2–2 | | | | 1–0 | | | | 2–1 | 2–1 | | | | | 0–0 | 3–1 | — |

Updated to match(es) played on 29 January 2021. Source:
Legend: Blue = home team win; Yellow = draw; Red = away team win.
For upcoming matches, an "a" indicates there is an article about the rivalry between the two participants.

== Season statistics ==
=== Top scorers ===
| Rank | Player | Club | Goals |
|---|---|---|---|
| 1 | (Kenya) Clifton Miheso | Kenya Police | 15 |
| 2 | (Kenya) Derrick Otanga | KCB | 14 |
| 3 | (Kenya) Felix Oluoch | Kariobangi Sharks | 11 |
| 4 | (Tanzania) Ibrahim Joshua | Tusker | 10 |
| 4 | (Kenya) Ezekiel Odera | Nairobi City | 10 |
| 4 | (Kenya) David Okoth | Kakamega | 10 |
| 7 | (Costa Rica) Erick Mata | Kariobangi Sharks | 9 |
| 8 | (Uganda) Peter Lwasa | Gor Mahia | 8 |
| 8 | (Kenya) Joseph Waithers | Sofapaka | 8 |
| 10 | (Kenya) Ellie Asieche | Wazito | 7 |
| 10 | (Kenya) Francis Kahiro | Talanta | 7 |
| 10 | (Kenya) Clinton Kinanga | Kenya Police | 7 |
| 10 | (Kenya) Timothy Otieno | Posta Rangers | 7 |
| 10 | (Uganda) William Wadri | Bandari | 7 |

=== Hat-tricks ===
| Player | For | Against | Result | Date |
|---|---|---|---|---|
| (Kenya) Felix Oluoch | Kariobangi Sharks | Mathare United | 6–0 | 31 October 2021 |
| (Kenya) Levis Barasa | Nzoia Sugar | Kariobangi Sharks | 3–1 | 11 December 2021 |
| (Tanzania) Ibrahim Joshua | Tusker | Mathare United | 3–1 | 30 December 2021 |

==== Notes ====
^{4} Player scored 4 goals
