= Timothy Ouma =

Kenyan footballer (born 2004)

Timothy Noor Ouma
- Ouma with Charlton Athletic in 2026

Personal information
- Full name: Timothy Noor Ouma
- Date of birth: 10 June 2004 (age 22)
- Place of birth: Nairobi, Kenya
- Height: 1.83 m (6 ft 0 in)
- Position: Defensive midfielder

Team information
- Current team: Charlton Athletic (on loan from Slavia Prague)
- Number: 16

Youth career
- 2012–2017: RYSA

Senior career*
Years	Team	Apps	(Gls)
2020–2022	Nairobi City Stars	56	(7)
2022–2025	IF Elfsborg	28	(1)
2025–	Slavia Prague	1	(0)
2025–	→ Slavia Prague B	2	(0)
2025–2026	→ Lech Poznań (loan)	21	(0)
2025	→ Lech Poznań II (loan)	1	(0)
2026–	→ Charlton Athletic (loan)	3	(0)

International career^{‡}
2024–	Kenya U20	2	(0)
2021–	Kenya	14	(0)
- * Club domestic league appearances and goals as of 17:10, 19 September 2026 (UTC) ‡ National team caps and goals as of 22:10, 1 October 2026 (UTC)

Timothy Noor Babu Ouma (born 10 June 2004) is a Kenyan professional footballer who plays as a defensive midfielder for EFL Championship club Charlton Athletic on loan from Czech First League club Slavia Prague and the Kenya national team.

== Club career ==
=== Nairobi City Stars ===
Babu joined Nairobi City Stars on an initial three-year deal in July 2020 right after completing his studies at Laiser Hill Academy. He extended his contract for two more years in September 2021 with an additional two years to June 2023 after his debut season in which he featured in 24 of the 34 games of the 2020–21 Kenyan Premier League.

Ouma was handed his Kenyan Premier League debut on 29 November 2020 by head coach Sanjin Alagic, coming on as a substitute in the 83rd minute of a season opener against Nzoia Sugar in Narok.

He scored his debut premier goal in the opening game of 2021–22 Premier League season against Sofapaka in Wundanyi on 26 September 2021. He went on to score in the next two games against Kenya Police and Wazito.

He added four more goals against Kakamega Homeboyz, Bandari, A.F.C. Leopards, and Gor Mahia to end the season with seven goals.

=== IF Elfsborg ===
In mid-July 2022, Ouma signed with Swedish top-tier side IF Elfsborg, and officially joined the club a month later.

Ouma earned his debut in the Swedish top-flight, the Allsvenskan, on 31 October 2022 at the Borås Arena during a matchday 29 tie against Helsingborgs IF, after coming on as a substitute in what was his only game in the 2022 season. He went on to feature in another four games of the 2023 season. His first start, and full Allsvenskan appearance, was against champions Malmö FF at the same venue in matchday seven of the 2024 season on 5 May 2024.

On 11 July 2024, Ouma played 63 minutes in his UEFA Europa League debut as IF Elfsborg hosted Cyprian side Pafos FC in a first leg qualifying round tie at the Borås Arena. He scored his maiden European goal in the reverse game on 18 July 2024, becoming only the second Kenyan to score at that stage after Robert Mambo Mumba who achieved the same on 15 September 2005 while playing for Viking FK during the 2005–06 UEFA Cup first round.

He scored his first Allsvenskan goal on 19 September 2024 as 10-men IF Elfsborg rallied to a 2–2 draw with IFK Norrköping in round 23. On 25 September 2024, he became the first Kenyan to score and to provide an assist in the UEFA Europa League group stage, as IF Elfsborg lost 2–3 to Dutch side AZ Alkmaar.

=== Slavia Prague ===
On 2 February 2025, Ouma signed a contract with Czech First League club Slavia Prague until 30 June 2029.

==== Loan to Lech Poznań ====
On 18 July 2025, Ouma joined Polish Ekstraklasa club Lech Poznań on a one-year loan deal without an option to buy. In January 2026, Ouma was excluded from the club's winter training camp in Abu Dhabi due to a breach of internal team discipline, and he was assigned to train with the reserve team pending improvement in his conduct. He rejoined the senior team in February. Ouma made 34 appearances for Lech, including 19 starts, as they won the 2025–26 Ekstraklasa title. He returned to Slavia after the season concluded.

==== Charlton Athletic (loan) ====
On 10 August 2026, Ouma joined Charlton Athletic on a season-long loan with an option to make the move permanent.

== International career ==
In late October 2021, Babu received a Kenya national football team call-up from head coach Engin Firat for two final World Cup qualifying games against Uganda and Rwanda.

Babu made his senior debut for Kenya on 11 November 2021 against the former after coming on as a 72nd-minute substitute. He earned his second cap four days later on 15 November against Rwanda after being introduced in the 80th minute.

He featured in an international friendly against South Sudan in Moi International Sports Centre on 23 September 2023, and went on to make his first appearance in 2026 World Cup qualifiers after making a cameo appearance against Gabon at the Stade de Franceville on 16 November 2023, and added another game on 20 Nov 2023 against Seychelles at the Felix Houphouet Boigny Stadium in Abidjan.

He then dropped down to feature for the Kenya U20 during an invitational tournament in Lilongwe, Malawi, in March 2024. He featured in two games against Zimbabwe and the hosts Malawi.

He scaled back up to the Kenya senior team in June 2024 and earned his first start in a 2026 World Cup qualifiers tie against Burundi in Malawi, and followed it up with another one against African champions Ivory Coast.

== Career statistics ==
=== Club ===
As of match played 19 September 2026

Appearances and goals by club, season and competition
Club	Season	League			National cup (Note: Includes FKF President's Cup, Svenska Cupen, Polish Cup, FA Cup)		League cup (Note: Includes EFL Cup)		Continental		Other		Total	
Club	Season	Division	Apps	Goals	Apps	Goals	Apps	Goals	Apps	Goals	Apps	Goals	Apps	Goals
Nairobi City Stars	2020–21	Kenyan Premier League	24	0	3	0	—		0	0	—		27	0
Nairobi City Stars	2021–22	Kenyan Premier League	32	7	0	0	—		0	0	—		32	7
Nairobi City Stars	Total		56	7	3	0	—		0	0	—		59	7
IF Elfsborg	2022	Allsvenskan	1	0	0	0	—		0	0	—		1	0
IF Elfsborg	2023	Allsvenskan	4	0	0	0	—		0	0	—		4	0
IF Elfsborg	2024	Allsvenskan	23	1	1	0	—		13 (Note: Appearances in UEFA Europa League)	2	—		37	3
IF Elfsborg	Total		28	1	1	0	—		13	2	—		42	3
Slavia Praha	2024–25	Czech First League	1	0	0	0	—		0	0	—		1	0
Slavia Praha	2025–26	Czech First League	0	0	0	0	—		0	0	—		0	0
Slavia Praha	2026–27	Czech First League	0	0	0	0	—		0	0	—		0	0
Slavia Praha	Total		1	0	0	0	—		0	0	—		1	0
Slavia Praha B	2024–25	FNL	2	0	—		—		—		—		2	0
Lech Poznań (loan)	2025–26	Ekstraklasa	21	0	1	0	—		12 (Note: Four appearances in UEFA Champions League, two appearances in UEFA Europa League, six appearances in UEFA Conference League)	0	—		34	0
Lech Poznań II (loan)	2025–26	III liga, group II	1	0	—		—		—		—		1	0
Charlton Athletic (loan)	2026–27	Championship	3	0	0	0	1	0	—		—		4	0
Career total			112	8	5	0	1	0	25	2	0	0	143	10

=== International ===
As of match played 1 October 2026

Appearances and goals by national team and year
National team	Year	Apps	Goals
Kenya	2021	2	0
Kenya	2023	2	0
Kenya	2024	4	0
Kenya	2025	4	0
Kenya	2026	2	0
Total		14	0

== Honours ==
IF Elfsborg

- Allsvenskan runner-up: 2023
- Allsvenskan U21 winner: 2022

Slavia Prague

- Czech First League: 2024–25

Lech Poznań

- Ekstraklasa: 2025–26
