= Mukisa =

Mukisa is a surname. Notable people with the surname include:

- Fred Mukisa (1949–2019), Ugandan politician and educator
- Robina Hope Mukisa (born 1991), Ugandan politician
- Yusuf Mukisa (born 1993), Ugandan footballer
