= Joash Onyango =

Kenyan footballer

Personal information
- Full name: Joash Abong'o Onyango
- Date of birth: 31 January 1993 (age 33)
- Place of birth: Eldoret
- Position: Defender

Team information
- Current team: Simba
- Number: 40

Senior career*
Years	Team	Apps	(Gls)
2015–2016	Western Stima		
2017–2019	Gor Mahia		
2020–2023	Simba		
2023–2024	Fountain Gate		
2024–2024	Singida Big Stars		
2024–	Dodoma Jiji		

International career^{‡}
2018–	Kenya	5	(0)
- * Club domestic league appearances and goals ‡ National team caps and goals as of 11 September 2018

Joash Abong'o Onyango (born 31 January 1993) is a Kenyan professional footballer who plays as a central defender (Association football) for Tanzanian Premier League club Dodoma Jiji FC and the Kenya national team.

== International career ==
Onyango made his debut for Kenya on 25 May 2018 against Swaziland.Onyango was named in the Kenya national football team as top defenders to play in 2019 Africa Cup of Nations in Egypt but did not participate due to knee injury. Before then during the U17 team tournaments, he played Centre Midfield and was nicknamed 'Deco' after Portuguese footballer Deco.

== Career statistics ==
=== International ===
Statistics accurate as of match played 11 September 2018

Kenya national team
Year	Apps	Goals
2018	4	0
Total	4	0

== Honours ==
- Kenyan Premier League: winner (2017, 2018)
