= Ochieng =

Ochieng is an African male surname of the Luo people. The name means "born during sunshine hours", i.e. afternoon. Before colonial times, if a Luo baby was born in the morning, it was named "Omondi", and if in the evening, "Odhiambo". Luo tribe base their names on day to day occurrences, important times in history and occasionally on prominent figures.

People with this name include:

- Bernard Ochieng, Kenyan footballer
- Collins Ochieng (born 1987), Kenyan footballer
- Daudi Ochieng (1925–1966), Ugandan politician
- David Ochieng (born 1992), Kenyan footballer
- Duncan Ochieng (born 1978), Kenyan footballer
- Edgar Ochieng (born 1977), Kenyan footballer
- Enosh Ochieng (born 1991), Kenyan footballer
- Eric Ochieng, Kenyan footballer
- Erick Ochieng (born 1987), British boxer
- Eugene Ochieng (born 1993), Kenyan cricketer
- Felix 'Toti' Ochieng, Kenyan rugby coach
- Frazier Ochieng (born 1975), Kenyan footballer
- Francis Ochieng (born 1982), Kenyan footballer
- Henry Ochieng (born 1998), Kenyan footballer
- Kennedy Ochieng (born 1971), Kenyan sprinter
- Kevin Ochieng (born 1985), Kenyan footballer
- Mark Ochieng, Australian soccer player
- Ovella Ochieng (born 1999), Kenyan footballer
- Pascal Ochieng (born 1986), Kenyan footballer
- Pius Ochieng (born 1960), Kenyan weightlifter
- Raymond Ochieng (born 1977), Kenyan boxer
- Tony Harvard Ochieng (born 2002), Kenyan academic
- Victor Ochieng (born 1991), Kenyan footballer
- Washington Yotto Ochieng, Kenyan academic
- Willis Ochieng (born 1981), Kenyan footballer
