= 2017 Kenyan Premier League =

Kenyan Premier League
- Season: 2017
- Champions: Gor Mahia; 4th Premier League title 16th Kenyan title overall
- Champ. League: Gor Mahia
- Confed. Cup: A.F.C. Leopards (cup winners)
- Matches: 263
- Goals: 512 (1.95 per match)
- Top goalscorer: (Kenya) Masoud Juma: (15 goals)
- Biggest home win: Mathare United 6–0 Zoo Kericho (19 August 2017)
- Biggest away win: 6 matches: Tusker 2–5 Nzoia Sugar (11 March 2017); Nakumatt 0–3 A.F.C. Leopards (19 March 2017); A.F.C. Leopards 0–3 Gor Mahia (7 May 2017); Muhoroni Youth 0–3 Nzoia Sugar (20 May 2017); Chemelil Sugar 0–3 Gor Mahia (14 September 2017); Bandari 0–3 Tusker (20 September 2017)
- Highest scoring: 3 matches: Tusker 2–5 Nzoia Sugar (11 March 2017); Sofapaka 5–2 Nakumatt (19 August 2017); Nakumatt 3–4 Muhoroni Youth (7 October 2017)
- All statistics correct as of 21 October 2017.

The 2017 Kenyan Premier League (known as the SportPesa Premier League for sponsorship reasons) was the 14th season of the Kenyan Premier League since it began in 2003, and the 54th season of top-division football in Kenya since 1963. It began on 11 March and ended on 18 November. Tusker was the defending champions, going into the season on the back of their 11th league title.

The Kenyan Premier League was expanded to 18 teams, of which 14 returned from the 2016 season. Kariobangi Sharks, Nakumatt, Nzoia Sugar (formerly Nzoia United) and Zoo Kericho were promoted from the second-tier National Super League.

On 21 October 2017, Gor Mahia secured their record 16th league title with four games to spare after beating Ulinzi Stars 3–1 at the Kericho Green Stadium.

== Changes from last season ==
Locations of the 2017 Kenyan Premier League teams.
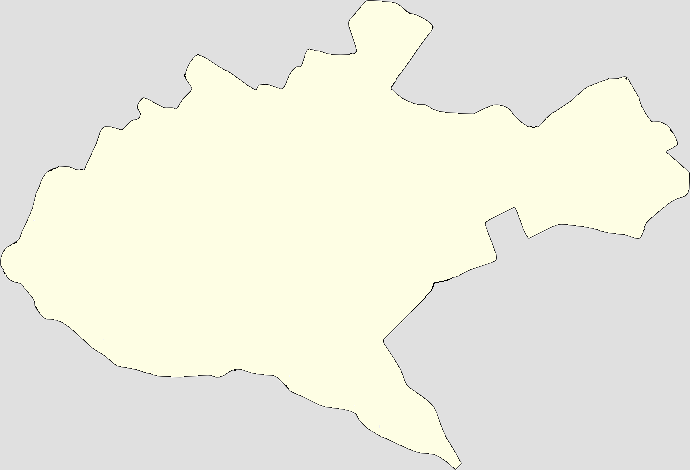
Locations of the 2017 Kenyan Premier League teams within Nairobi.

Relegated from Premier League

- Nairobi City Stars
- Ushuru

Promoted from National Super League

- Kariobangi Sharks
- Nakumatt
- Nzoia Sugar (formerly Nzoia United)
- Zoo Kericho

== Teams ==
Seven of the participating teams are based in the capital, Nairobi, while Bandari is the only team based at the Coast.

=== Stadia and locations ===
Team	Location	Stadium	Capacity
A.F.C. Leopards	Nairobi	Nyayo National Stadium	30,000
Bandari	Mombasa	Mombasa Municipal Stadium	10,000
Chemelil Sugar	Chemelil	Chemelil Sports Complex	5,000
Gor Mahia	Nairobi	Nairobi City Stadium	15,000
Kakamega Homeboyz	Kakamega	Bukhungu Stadium	10,000
Kariobangi Sharks	Nairobi	Nairobi City Stadium	15,000
Mathare United	Nairobi	Kasarani Stadium	60,000
Muhoroni Youth	Muhoroni	Muhoroni Stadium	5,000
Nakumatt	Nairobi	Nyayo National Stadium	30,000
Nzoia Sugar	Mumias	Mumias Sports Complex	10,000
Posta Rangers	Eldoret	Kipchoge Keino Stadium	10,000
Sofapaka	Nairobi	Nyayo National Stadium	30,000
Sony Sugar	Awendo	Awendo Green Stadium	5,000
Thika United	Thika	Thika Municipal Stadium	5,000
Tusker	Nairobi	Kasarani Stadium	60,000
Ulinzi Stars	Nakuru	Afraha Stadium	8,200
Western Stima	Kakamega	Bukhungu Stadium	5,000
Zoo Kericho	Kericho	Kericho Green Stadium	5,000

== League table ==
Pos	Team	Pld	W	D	L	GF	GA	GD	Pts	Qualification or relegation
1	Gor Mahia (C, Q)	34	22	8	4	53	22	+31	74	Qualification for 2018 CAF Champions League
2	Sofapaka	34	15	10	9	48	31	+17	55	
3	Kariobangi Sharks	34	13	13	8	42	26	+16	52	
4	Posta Rangers	34	11	18	5	28	22	+6	51	
5	Kakamega Homeboyz	34	12	14	8	30	23	+7	50	
6	Tusker	34	14	8	12	33	34	−1	50	
7	Ulinzi Stars	34	12	12	10	37	29	+8	48	
8	A.F.C. Leopards (Q)	34	12	9	13	26	28	−2	45	Qualification for 2018 CAF Confederation Cup (Note: A.F.C. Leopards qualified for the 2018 CAF Confederation Cup as winners of the 2017 FKF President's Cup.)
9	Nzoia Sugar	34	11	11	12	41	40	+1	44	
10	Bandari	34	12	7	15	34	33	+1	43	
11	SoNy Sugar	34	10	13	11	31	30	+1	43	
12	Zoo Kericho	34	9	13	12	39	49	−10	40	
13	Mathare United	34	8	15	11	32	36	−4	39	
14	Chemelil Sugar	34	8	15	11	28	34	−6	39	
15	Nakumatt	34	10	9	15	33	41	−8	39	Relegation to National Super League
16	Thika United	34	8	14	12	27	36	−9	38	Relegation to National Super League
17	Western Stima	34	9	11	14	31	41	−10	38	Relegation to National Super League
18	Muhoroni Youth	34	5	10	19	27	65	−38	25	Relegation to National Super League

Updated to match(es) played on 18 November 2017. Source: Soccerway.com
Rules for classification: 1) points; 2) goal difference; 3) goals scored; 4) playoff.
(C) Champions; (Q) Qualified for the phase indicated

=== Positions by round ===
The table lists the positions of teams after each week of matches. In order to preserve chronological evolvements, any postponed matches are not included to the round at which they were originally scheduled, but added to the full round they were played immediately afterwards. For example, if a match is scheduled for matchday 13, but then postponed and played between days 16 and 17, it will be added to the standings for day 16.

Team ╲ Round	1	2	3	4	5	6	7	8	9	10	11	12	13	14	15	16	17	18	19	20	21	22	23	24	25	26	27	28	29	30	31	32	33	34
Posta Rangers	5	6	7	2	2	1	1	1																										
Gor Mahia	2	1	3	1	1	2	2	2																										
Sofapaka	7	14	3	5	4	5	3	3																										
A.F.C. Leopards	7	7	2	6	5	2	4	4																										
Chemelil Sugar	3	3	9	3	6	6	5	5																										
Ulinzi Stars	7	12	11	7	7	4	6	6																										
Nzoia Sugar	1	2	8	12	8	8	7	7																										
Tusker	18	18	16	15	14	15	11	8																										
Bandari	5	5	1	3	3	7	8	9																										
Kakamega Homeboyz	7	11	6	11	12	13	9	10																										
Kariobangi Sharks	16	16	17	16	10	12	10	11																										
Mathare United	4	4	10	10	12	16	16	12																										
Nakumatt	14	17	14	13	15	9	13	13																										
Muhoroni Youth	7	9	15	14	16	10	12	14																										
SoNy Sugar	17	10	5	8	9	11	14	15																										
Thika United	13	8	12	9	11	14	15	16																										
Western Stima	7	12	13	16	17	17	17	17																										
Zoo Kericho	14	15	18	18	18	18	18	18																										

Leader
Relegation to the 2018 Kenyan National Super League

Updated to match(es) played on 1 May 2017. Source: Futaa.com

== Results ==
Home \ Away	AFC	BND	CHM	GOR	KHB	KBS	MAU	MHY	NKM	NZS	PRN	SOF	SNY	THU	TUS	ULS	WST	ZOO
A.F.C. Leopards		0–1		0–3	0–0	0–2	0–0	1–0		2–1	0–2	0–1	0–1	2–0	1–0	0–0	0–1	1–1
Bandari	0–1		0–1	1–2	0–0	0–1	2–2	3–0	1–0	2–1		1–2	0–0	3–0	0–3		0–0	3–0
Chemelil Sugar	2–0	1–0		0–3	1–1	1–1	1–1	1–1	2–0	2–1	1–1	0–1		0–0		2–1		1–1
Gor Mahia	1–1	3–1	2–0		1–0	3–1	0–1	2–0	2–0	4–0	1–0	2–1		1–1	0–0	2–2		1–0
Kakamega Homeboyz	1–0	1–0				2–1	1–1	2–0	1–2	1–2	1–1	2–1	1–0	2–1	1–1	1–0	1–0	3–3
Kariobangi Sharks	0–0	1–0	2–2	1–3	0–0		3–0		1–0		2–2	0–0	2–0	1–0	0–0	0–1	1–0	1–1
Mathare United	0–0	0–1	0–0	1–0	1–0	1–2			1–1		0–1	1–2	0–0	3–2	0–2	0–1	2–1	6–0
Muhoroni Youth			0–1	1–2		1–0	0–0		1–1	0–3	1–1	2–3	2–0	2–0	0–1	0–0	0–1	1–1
Nakumatt	0–3		2–1	0–1	0–0		2–1	3–4		0–1	2–0	2–1	0–0	2–1	0–1	1–2	2–0	
Nzoia Sugar		3–0	0–0	0–1		0–2	0–0	3–1	1–1		1–0	1–1	1–1	0–0	1–2	1–0	0–0	1–1
Posta Rangers	1–1	0–0	1–1	1–1		1–0		0–0	0–0	2–1		1–0	0–0	1–1	1–0	0–0	1–0	
Sofapaka	2–0	1–1	4–1	2–0	0–0	0–0		1–1	5–2	3–1	1–1		0–1	3–0	2–2	0–1		
SoNy Sugar	1–0	0–1	0–2	1–2	0–1	0–0	1–1			2–2	0–1			1–0	2–0	1–1	2–0	2–1
Thika United	1–2		1–0	0–0	0–0	1–0		1–1	2–2	1–0	2–2	0–0			2–0	2–3	1–1	1–0
Tusker	1–0	0–1	1–0	0–2	1–0	0–0	1–0	4–0	2–1	2–5	1–1		2–1			1–1	2–1	2–1
Ulinzi Stars	0–1	2–1	1–0	0–1	0–1		5–1	2–1	0–1	1–2	1–0	2–1	1–1	0–0				1–2
Western Stima	1–1	2–1	0–0	2–1	0–0	1–1	3–2	1–2	1–1	0–2		1–3	1–2	1–1	1–0			0–2
Zoo Kericho	1–3	3–2	2–0		1–0	3–2	0–0	1–1	0–2	2–2	0–1	0–3	1–1		0–2	0–0	4–2	

Updated to match(es) played on 21 October 2017. Source: Soccerway
Legend: Blue = home team win; Yellow = draw; Red = away team win.

== Top scorers ==
Rank	Player	Club	Goals
1	(Kenya) Masoud Juma	Kariobangi Sharks	17
2	(Rwanda) Meddie Kagere	Gor Mahia	13
3	(Rwanda) Jacques Tuyisenge	Gor Mahia	12
4	(Kenya) Kepha Aswani	Mount Kenya Utd	11
4	(Kenya) Stephen Waruru	Ulinzi Stars	11
6	(Kenya) Chrispin Oduor	Mathare United	10
7	(Kenya) Lawrence Juma	Nzola Sugar	8
8	(Uganda) Umaru Kasumba	Sofapaka	7
8	(Kenya) Humphrey Mieno	Tusker	7
8	(Kenya) Dennis Mukaisi	Posta Rangers	7

=== Hat-tricks ===
Player	For	Against	Score	Date
(Kenya) Benard Odhiambo	Bandari	Zoo	3-2	20 May 2017
(Kenya) Keiphas Mutuu	Kakamega	Zoo	3-3	18 June 2017
(Rwanda) Jacques Tuyisenge	Gor Mahia	Kariobangi Sharks	3-1	17 October 2017
(Kenya) Masoud Juma^{4}	Kariobangi Sharks	Muhoroni	7-0	14 November 2017
