= Wycliffe Onyango =

Kenyan football coach (born 1989)

Wycliffe Otieno Onyango
Personal information
- Full name: Wycliffe Otieno Onyango
- Date of birth: 31 January 1989 (age 37)
- Height: 1.85 m (6 ft 1 in)
- Position: Defender

Team information
- Current team: Mathare United F.C.

Youth career
- Kenya School of Law

Senior career*
Years	Team	Apps	(Gls)
2011-13	Kenya School of Law		
2013-2016	Nairobi Stima		
2017-2018	F.C. Kariobangi Sharks	26	(0)
2019-20	Nairobi City Stars	23	(0)
2020-22	Nairobi City Stars	21	(0)

Managerial career
- 2022-: Mathare United F.C. (assistant)
- * Club domestic league appearances and goals as of 12 May 2023

Wycliffe Otieno Onyango is a former Kenyan defender with Kenyan Premier League side Nairobi City Stars who recently retired and now serves as an assistant coach at Mathare United F.C.

== Career ==
Wycliffe formerly turned out for Kenya School of Law, Nairobi Stima and FC Kariobangi Sharks before joining Nairobi City Stars in July 2019.

He formed a formidable defensive partnership with Salim Abdalla in the 2019-20 National Super League season as Nairobi City Stars went on to earn promotion to Kenya's top-tier league for the next season.

He stayed on after the team's promotion to the Premier League, and added one more season to feature in the 2021-22 FKF PL.

He called it a day at season end and went on to seek his coaching badges moving away from his earlier passion of being an anchor. He is now the assistant coach of Kenyan Premier League side Mathare United F.C. since the beginning of the 2022–23 season.

== Honours ==
=== Club ===
Kariobangi Sharks

- National Super League

(silver) Runners-up (1): 2017

- GOtv Shield

(silver) Runners-up (1): 2017
(gold) Champions (1): 2018
Nairobi City Stars

- National Super League

(gold) Champions (1): 2019-20
