= Clinton Okoth =

Kenyan footballer

Personal information
- Full name: Clinton Okoth
- Date of birth: 11 November 2001 (age 24)
- Height: 1.73 m (5 ft 8 in)
- Position: Striker

Youth career
- Migori Youth

Senior career*
Years	Team	Apps	(Gls)
2019-20	Migori Youth	24	(14)
2020	Gor Mahia F.C.		
2020-21	Wazito F.C.		
2021	Bidco United F.C.		
2021-	Migori Youth	25	(20)
- * Club domestic league appearances and goals

Clinton Okoth is a Kenyan striker currently in the ranks of Kenya's second-tier side Migori Youth. He formerly turned out for Kenyan Premier League sides Gor Mahia F.C., Wazito F.C. and Bidco United F.C.

== Career ==
In January 2020, Clinton moved to Gor Mahia F.C. on loan from Migori Youth before crossing over to Wazito F.C. in November of the same year. In March 2021 he left for Bidco United F.C. for the rest of the season before making a return to Migori Youth for the 2021/22 National Super League season.
