= Levis Opiyo =

Kenyan footballer (born 1995)

Levis Opiyo Omondi
Personal information
- Full name: Levis Opiyo Omondi
- Date of birth: 12 March 1995 (age 31)
- Place of birth: Thika, Kenya
- Height: 1.75 m (5 ft 9 in)
- Position: Goalkeeper

Team information
- Current team: A.F.C. Leopards
- Number: 32

Youth career
- 2010-2013: Thika United F.C.

Senior career*
Years	Team	Apps	(Gls)
2013-2015	Thika United F.C.	13	(0)
2013	→ Mahakama F.C. (loan)	9	(0)
2016	Posta Rangers	0	(0)
2016	Western Stima	7	(0)
2017	Mathare United	26	(0)
2018	Fortuna Babelsberg	13	(0)
2018-2019	Posta Rangers	11	(0)
2018-2019	Vihiga United	8	(0)
2019-2020	Nairobi City Stars	37	(0)
2020	Gor Mahia	0	(0)
2021	Wazito FC	15	(0)
2021-	AFC Leopards	25	(0)
2025-2026	Bandari	5	(0)
2026-	Zesco United	1	(0)
- * Club domestic league appearances and goals as of 19:31, 21 Nov 2023 (UTC)

Levis Lovae Opiyo Omondi is a Kenyan goalkeeper currently in the ranks of Zambian Premier League side Zesco United.

== Career ==
Levis is an alumnus of Kenyatta Primary School, Thika, and Tetu High School. His star started to rise when, while at Tetu High, he emerged as the best keeper in Central region in 2010, and 2011 while featuring for Shimanzi and AC Thika in Safaricom's U23 nationwide tournament Sakata Ball. After High School, he joined Kenyan Premier League side Thika United in 2013. He was loaned out to second-tier side Mahakama F.C. on a six-month spell to gain work experience.

He was then off to Premiership sides Posta Rangers and Western Stima in 2016 before landing at Mathare United in 2017. He returned to Posta Rangers in 2018 before heading out to join German side Fortuna Babelsberg.

He was back to Posta Rangers for the 2018/19 season before joining Vihiga United for the remainder of the season. Levis then joined promotion chasing Nairobi City Stars then crossed over to Gor Mahia F.C. in 2020, then to Wazito FC in 2021, and finally to A.F.C. Leopards the same year.

In September 2025 Opiyo headed to Kenyan coastal club Bandari but left barely five months later to join Zambian Premier League side Zesco United on a two-year deal.

Opiyo has also been part of the Kenya national football team after making the provisional squad for a series of friendly games in Mar 2023.

== Style of play ==
Levis is known for his vocal command and his ability to organize his defense line. He is known for his quick reflexes, as a penalty-stopper, and for playing the ball from the back due to comfort of the ball on his feet enabling his team to build play from the raer.

== Honors ==
=== Club ===
Nairobi City Stars

(gold) Champion (1): 2019-20 National Super League

=== Individual ===
(gold) Best goalkeeper (2): Sakata Ball, Central region - 2010, 2011
