= 2021–22 Premier League (disambiguation) =

The 2021–22 Premier League was a professional association football league season in England.

2021–22 Premier League may also refer to:

== Association football ==
- 2021–22 Armenian Premier League
- 2021–22 Azerbaijan Premier League
- 2021–22 Bahraini Premier League
- 2021–22 Bangladesh Premier League
- 2022 Belarusian Premier League
- 2021–22 Premier League of Bosnia and Herzegovina
- 2022 Canadian Premier League season
- 2021–22 Egyptian Premier League
- 2021–22 Ethiopian Premier League
- 2022 Faroe Islands Premier League
- 2021–22 Ghana Premier League
- 2021–22 Hong Kong Premier League
- 2021–22 Iraqi Premier League
- 2021–22 Israeli Premier League
- 2022 Kazakhstan Premier League
- 2021–22 Kenyan Premier League
- 2021–22 Kerala Premier League
- 2021–22 Kuwaiti Premier League
- 2021–22 Lebanese Premier League
- 2021–22 Maltese Premier League
- 2022 National Premier Leagues (Australia)
- 2021–22 Russian Premier League
- 2021–22 Scottish Women's Premier League
- 2021–22 Syrian Premier League
- 2021–22 Ukrainian Premier League
- 2021–22 Welsh Premier League

== Basketball ==
- 2021–22 Hrvatski telekom Premijer liga
- 2021–22 Israeli Basketball Premier League

== Cricket ==
- 2021–22 Bangladesh Premier League
- 2022 Caribbean Premier League
- 2023 Kashmir Premier League
- 2022 Indian Premier League
- 2022 Lanka Premier League

== Darts ==
- 2022 Premier League Darts

== Volleyball ==
- 2022 Premier Volleyball League season (Philippines)
