= Gateri =

Gateri is a Kenyan surname. Notable people with the surname include:

- David Gateri (born 1994), Kenyan footballer
- Teresia Muthoni Gateri (born 2002), Kenyan long-distance runner
