= Green Stadium =

Green Stadium may refer to these sports stadiums:

- Green Stadium, Awendo, Awendo, Kenya, where SoNy Sugar F.C. play their home matches
- Green Stadium, Kericho, Kericho, Kenya, where Zoo Kericho F.C. play their home matches
- Green Stadium, Nof HaGalil, Nof HaGalil, Israel, formerly occupied by Hapoel Acre F.C. and Hapoel Nof HaGalil F.C.
- Green Venice Stadium, Venice, Italy, also known as Green Venice Arena
- Green Park Stadium, Kanpur, Uttar Pradesh, India, formerly known as the Modi Stadium
