= Alex Onchwari =

Kenyan footballer

Personal information
- Full name: Alex Onchwari
- Date of birth: 18 February 1998 (age 28)
- Height: 1.88 m (6 ft 2 in)
- Position: Defender

Senior career*
Years	Team	Apps	(Gls)
2019	White Rhinos		
2019–22	Zoo Kericho F.C.		
2022-	Horseed FC		
2023-24	Muhoroni Youth		
2024	Tusker F.C.		
- * Club domestic league appearances and goals as of 16 Jul 2024

Alex Onchwari is a Kenyan defender who turns out for Kenyan Premier League side Tusker.

== Career ==
Onchwari was scouted at the Chapa Dimba tournament while featuring for Narok-based White Rhino where he made it to the All Star team for a Spanish tour.

He turned out for Kenyan Premier League sides Zoo Kericho F.C. and Muhoroni Youth, as well as Somali side Horseed FC in between the two. From Muhoroni Youth he moved to Tusker FC in July 2024.
