= Salim Abdalla =

Kenyan footballer (born 1990)

Salim Abdallah
Personal information
- Full name: Salim Yusuf Abdallah
- Date of birth: 21 December 1990 (age 35)
- Place of birth: Kanduyi, Kenya
- Height: 1.87 m (6 ft 2 in)
- Position: Defender

Youth career
- 2010: Bukembe

Senior career*
Years	Team	Apps	(Gls)
2011–2012	Ligi Ndogo		
2013	Sofapaka	0	(0)
2013–2014	→ Posta Rangers (loan)	0	(0)
2015–2016	Posta Rangers	22	(0)
2017–2019	AFC Leopards	67	(2)
2019–2020	Nairobi City Stars	27	(3)
2020–2023	Nairobi City Stars	52	(3)
- * Club domestic league appearances and goals as of 12 May 2023

Salim Yusuf "Shittu" Abdallah, is a Kenyan professional footballer who plays as a defender for Kenyan Premier League side Nairobi City Stars. He formerly previously played for Bukembe Academy, Ligi Ndogo, Sofapaka, Posta Rangers, and AFC Leopards.

== Career ==
Salim joined lower-tier side Ligi Ndogo in 2011, after being scouted from Bungoma-based Bukembe Academy. At the end of the year 2012, he moved to Premier League side Sofapaka on a four-year contract. He was then sent on loan to Posta Rangers at the start of the year 2013. The loan move was later made permanent.

In 2017, Salim joined AFC Leopards on a two-year deal. Upon expiry of that contract, he was handed a three-year deal but after only six months he was released by the club.

He joined Nairobi City Stars in August 2019, for a season after the arrival of Bosnian UEFA Pro coach Sanjin Alagic. He extended his stay at the club for a further two years after the team gained promotion to the Kenyan Premier League. He left at the end of the 2021–22 FKF Premier League season.

After eight months out, he returned to Nairobi City Stars during the mid-transfer window in February 2023 to boost the club's defense line.

== Honours ==
Posta Rangers

- National Super League: 2015

AFC Leopards

- GOtv Shield: 2017

Nairobi City Stars

- National Super League: 2019–20

Individual

- Kenyan Premier League: Player of the Week: May 2021 (Nairobi City Stars)
