= Owiti =

Owiti is a surname but can as well be someone's from first name. Notable people with the surname include:

- Jefari Owiti (born 1998), Kenyan footballer
- John Owiti (born 1942), Kenyan sprinter
- Joshua Owiti (born 1959), Kenyan bishop
- Owiti Owayo (born 1992), Kenyan Politician & Author
