= Aziz Okaka =

Kenyan footballer

Aziz Okaka is a Kenyan footballer who played as a forward for several Kenyan clubs including AFC Leopards, Sony Sugar, Nairobi City Stars, and Swedish side Gottne IF.

In January 2020, Okaka joined Nairobi City Stars ahead of the club's return to the Kenyan Premier League. He later featured for FC Talanta before returning to AFC Leopards. In 2025, he joined newly promoted Kenyan premier league side APS Bomet.

== Personal life ==
Okaka comes from a footballing family. His twin brothers Jefari Owiti and Faraj Odenyi have turned out for several Kenyan top tier sides.
