= Wesley Onguso =

Kenyan footballer

Personal information
- Full name: Wesley Onguso Arasa
- Date of birth: 24 November 1994 (age 31)
- Place of birth: Buretti, Kenya
- Height: 1.79 m (5 ft 10 in)
- Position: Left back

Team information
- Current team: Nairobi City Stars
- Number: 21

Youth career
- World Hope Academy (Vapor Sports)
- JMJ Academy

Senior career*
Years	Team	Apps	(Gls)
2013	Mathare United F.C.	0	(0)
2015	Al-Malaika Sudan	22	(3)
2016	Western Stima F.C.	25	(2)
2017	Sofapaka F.C.	20	
2018	Gor Mahia F.C.	15+	
2018-2019	Posta Rangers	-	
2019-2020	Nairobi City Stars	-	
Total		0	

International career^{‡}
2017–	Kenya	6	(0)
- * Club domestic league appearances and goals as of 08 January 2018 ‡ National team caps and goals as of 08 January 2018

Wesley Onguso (Kenyan English born 16 November 1994) is a Kenyan professional footballer who plays as a left fullback for National Super League club Nairobi City Stars and the Kenyan national team.

He has earned over 6 caps for the Kenyan national team since making his international debut on 3 December 2017 against Rwanda at Bukhungu Stadium, Kakamega, the match ended on a 2-0

== Early life ==
Growing up in Kawangware, Onguso attended Riverbank Primary School. He was so passionate about football making him enroll at World Hope Vapour Academy. After successful completion of the primary level, he joined Mukumu High School where he captained the school team to steer them to provincial level of competition. Meanwhile, he had joined JMJ Academy to advance his skills. Upon leaving High School, joined Kenyan Premier League clubs Mathare United F.C. and Al-Malakia FC. In 2016, he came back to Kenya and joined Western Stima F.C. club Sofapaka and Gor Mahia F.C. respectively.

== Club career ==
=== Mathare United F.C. ===
Wesley Onguso joined Mathare United F.C. in 2013 mid-season. In 2014 he joined the senior team coached by Stanley Okumbi.

=== Al-Malakia FC ===
Wesley joined Al-Malakia FC South Sudanese football club located in Juba, South Sudan which currently plays in the South Sudan Premier League. Anable to retain league title, as a young international player, Wesley got enough play time which enabled him to have 22 caps, 6 assists and 3 goals for Al-Malakia FC. Also won MTN Cup

=== Western Stima F.C. ===
After season completion in South Sudan, Wesley Onguso Joined Western Stima F.C.

=== Sofapaka F.C. ===
After a good run at Western Stima in 2016, Onguso joined Sofapaka F.C. 2017. With league expansion to 18 teams, Wesley has over 20 caps making Sofapaka F.C. finish second on the league table

=== Gor Mahia F.C. ===
On 23 June 2018, Kenyan Premier League club Gor Mahia announced that they had reached an agreement with Sofapaka for the transfer of Wesley,

=== International goals ===
Wesley Onguso made his international debut on 3 December 2017 against Rwanda at Bukhungu Stadium, Kakamega, the match ended on a 2-0
