= Stephen Njunge =

Kenyan footballer (born 1994)

Stephen Njunge Ndung'u
Personal information
- Full name: Stephen Njunge Ndung'u
- Date of birth: 2 February 1994 (age 32)
- Place of birth: Kiambu, Kenya
- Height: 1.84 m (6 ft 0 in)
- Position: Goalkeeper

Team information
- Current team: Mathare United
- Number: 1

Youth career
- 2010-2011: Euro Juniors

Senior career*
Years	Team	Apps	(Gls)
2012-2016	FC Talanta		
2016–2020	Wazito F.C.	20	(0)
2020–	Nairobi City Stars	50	(0)
2023–	Mathare United	12	(0)
- * Club domestic league appearances and goals as of 19:31, 5 Dec 2023 (UTC)

Stephen Njunge Ndung'u (born 2 January 1994) is a goalkeeper currently in the ranks of former Kenyan Premier League side Mathare United.

== Career ==
He previously played for Kiambu's Euronuts, National Youth Talent Academy (NYTA) in 2011, FC Talanta between 2012 and 2016, and Wazito F.C. from 2016 before joining Nairobi City Stars in late 2020 as a replacement to departing Levis Opiyo.

After two seasons, Njunge extended his contract for one more season to feature for the club in 2022/23 Premier League season. At the end of the 2022–23 Kenyan Premier League, Njunge left City Stars to join promotion-chasing Mathare United.

He has ambitions of solidifying his place in the team, as well as being part of the Kenya national football team.

== Award ==
At the close of the 2020/21 Premier League season, Njunge was named the (joint) runners-up Golden Glove winner after registering 11 clean sheets.
