= 2021 FKF President's Cup =

Tournament details
- Country: Kenya
- Dates: 13 February 2021 – 31 July 2021
- Teams: 64

The 2021 FKF President's Cup is the 65th edition of the top knockout tournament in Kenyan football. It is sponsored by Betway and known as the Betway Shield Cup for sponsorship purposes. The winner qualifies for the 2021–22 CAF Confederation Cup Preliminary round.

== Round and Draw Dates ==
The schedule is as follows

Round	Draw Date	Match Dates
Round of 64	4 February 2021	13–14 February 2021
Round of 32	18 February 2021	17–18 April 2021
Round of 16	22 April 2021	8–9 May 2021
Quarter-finals	13 May 2021	12–13 June 2021
Semi-finals	13 May 2021	3-4 July 2021
Finals	13 May 2021	31 July 2021

On 26 March 2021, the President of the Republic of Kenya announced that all sporting activities would be stopped until further notice due to the COVID - 19 Pandemic. This lockdown was lifted on 1 May 2021. This allowed sporting activities to continue. The new schedule for the 2021 Betway Cup Fixtures were announced on 18 May 2021 with the first match between Congo Boys and Gor Mahia to be played on 23 May 2021. The new schedule is as follows:

Round	Draw Date	Match Dates
Round of 64		23 May 2021
Round of 32		1–3 June 2021
Round of 16	25 May 2021	5–6 June 2021
Quarter-finals	8 June 2021	12–13 June 2021
Semi-finals	8 June 2021	3-4 July 2021
Finals	8 June 2021	31 July 2021

== Round of 64 ==
The draw for the Round of 64 was held on 4 February 2021 with registration having ended on 2 February 2021.

13 February 2021	Vegpro	2–0	SS Assad (3)	Naivasha
15:00 EAT	Kinyokie 9'; Wafula 90'	Report		Stadium: Longonot Horticulture Grounds

13 February 2021	Elim F.C. (4)	0–5	Ulinzi Stars F.C. (1)	Kitale
15:15 EAT		Report		Stadium: Kenyatta Stadium

14 February 2021	Blessings	0–3	Equity (2)	Kitale
13:00 EAT				Stadium: Kenyatta Stadium

14 February 2021	Rware F.C.	0–3	Posta Rangers (1)	Nyeri
15:00 EAT		Report	Oalo 17'; Okare 69'; Dwang 82'	Stadium: Ruringu Stadium

14 February 2021	Sigalagala TTI	7–2	Dero (4)	Sigalagala
15:00 EAT				Stadium: Sigalagala Grounds

14 February 2021	MMUST (3)	1–1 (10–11 p)	Bidco (1)	Kakamega
15:00 EAT	Okumu 39'	Report	Juma 27'	Stadium: Kakamega Approved School

14 February 2021	Tikki (4)	0–6	AFC Leopards (1)	Wundanyi
15:00 EAT		Report	Rupia (penalty missed) 5' 7' 42'; Mwendwa 13'; Senaji 45+2'; Awiti 58'; Tsuma (yellow card) 30'	Stadium: Wundanyi Stadium

14 February 2021	Kitale All-Stars	0–1	Sofapaka (1)	Kitale
15:15 EAT		Report	Otieno 48'	Stadium: Kenyatta Stadium; Attendance: 0 (Note: behind closed doors.)

14 February 2021	Murang'a SEAL (2)	2–2 (3–4 p)	Bandari (1)	Murang'a
15:15 EAT	27'; 60' (pen.)		Wadri 11'; Mosha 38'	Stadium: St Seberstian's Park

23 May 2021	Congo Boys (2)	0–3	Gor Mahia (1)	Mombasa
13:00 EAT				Stadium: Mbaraki Sports Club

== Round of 32 ==
The draw for the Round of 32 matches was held on 18 February 2021, with the matches being scheduled to take place between 17 April and 18 April 2021. However, with the country being put on lockdown, new dates of 1–3 June 2021 were set for the Round of 32 Matches.

1 June 2021	Fortune Sacco (2)	0–1	Nairobi City Stars (1)	Kirinyaga
14:00 EAT	Odera			Stadium: Kirinyaga Stadium

3 June 2021	Gor Mahia	5–0	CUSCO (4)
15:00 EAT

3 June 2021	Marafiki (4)	1–4	Tusker
15:15 EAT

3 June 2021	Sofapaka (1)	0–2	Ulinzi (1)
15:00 EAT

2 June 2021	AFC Leopards (1)	1–0	Posta Rangers (1)	Thika
15:15 EAT	Shichenje			Stadium: Thika Stadium

3 June 2021	Malindi Progressive (3)	0–1	Luanda Villa (3)
14:00 EAT

2 June 2021	Bandari (1)	5–1	Dimba Patriots (4)
15:00 EAT

3 June 2021	Bungoma Superstars (3)	3–0	Nation (4)
14:00 EAT

1 June 2021	KCB (1)	2–0	Transfoc (3)
		This match was a walkover as Transfoc did not show up for the game

2 June 2021	Kariobangi Sharks (1)	2–0	Tandaza (4)
15:00 EAT

== Round of 16 ==
The draw for the Round of 16 matches was held on 25 May 2021, with the matches being scheduled to take place between 5 June and 6 June 2021.

Bidco United finished 3rd in the FKF Cup.

== Prize Fund ==
Round	Fate	Number of Teams	Reward
3rd and 4th Play-offs	Winner	1	Ksh. 750,000
3rd and 4th Play-offs	Loser	1	Ksh. 500,000
Finals	Winner	1	Ksh. 2,000,000
Finals	Loser	1	Ksh. 1,000,000
Total			Ksh. 4,250,000
Source: FKF
