= 2018 FKF President's Cup =

Tournament details
- Country: Kenya

Final positions
- Champions: Kariobangi Sharks
- Runners-up: Sofapaka

The 2018 FKF President's Cup, known as the 2018 FKF SportPesa Shield for sponsorship reasons, is the 2018 edition of the FKF President's Cup, the knockout football competition of Kenya.

== Bracket ==
From round of 16:

== Semi-finals ==
Sunday, September 23, 2018

- Kariobangi Sharks 4-1 Ulinzi Stars (MISC Kasarani, 2 pm)
- Sofapaka 1-0 AFC Leopards (MISC Kasarani, 4.15 pm)

== Third-Place Playoff ==
Saturday, October 20, 2018

- Ulinzi Stars 1-1 (5-4 p) AFC Leopards (MISC Kasarani, 12 pm)

== Final ==
Saturday, October 20, 2018

- Kariobangi Sharks 3-2 Sofapaka (MISC Kasarani, 3.15 pm)

== See also ==
- 2018 Kenyan Premier League
