= Andreas Spier =

Romanian-German football manager

Personal information
- Date of birth: 22 December 1962 (age 63)
- Place of birth: Bucharest, Romania

Team information
- Current team: Manjung City (head coach)

Managerial career
- Years: Team
- 1995–2000: SG 01 Hoechst
- 2000–2002: Kickers Offenbach (Junior)
- 2005–2006: SV Darmstadt 98 (Assistant)
- 2005–2006: VfB Stuttgart (Assistant)
- 2006–2007: SV Wehen Wiesbaden (Junior)
- 2008: Rwanda (Women)
- 2008: Rwanda U20 (Women)
- 2009–2013: APR (Academy)
- 2013–2014: APR
- 2014–2016: Romania U20
- 2016–2018: Kenya U17
- 2022: Gor Mahia
- 2024–2025: Ulaanbaatar
- 2025–2026: MFF (Technical Director)
- 2026–: Manjung City

Andreas Spier (also known as Andrei Spier; born 22 December 1962) is a Romanian-German football coach.

== Managerial career ==
Spier was born in Bucharest, Romania but lived most of his life in Germany where he earned his coaching qualifications. He began coaching in the 1990s. He earned his UEFA "Pro" license from the German Football Federation in 2005. Between 2000 and 2007, Spier held positions as youth coach and assistant at several large clubs including SV Darmstadt 98, VfB Stuttgart, and SV Wehen Wiesbaden. Beginning in 2008, he then spent eight years working in Rwanda and lead APR F.C. to the Rwanda Premier League title in 2013–14. Also while in Rwanda, Spier lead the Rwanda women's national team in 2008.

In 2014, he left Africa to become the head coach of the Romania national under-20 team. He remained with the team until 2016. Later in 2016, he signed a two-year contract to become Technical Director of the Football Kenya Federation, securing a return to Africa. While serving as Technical Director, Spier also acted as head coach of the national under-17 team in 2017 U-17 Africa Cup of Nations qualification and 2019 U-17 Africa Cup of Nations qualification.

In February 2022, Spier signed a six-month contract to become head coach of Gor Mahia of the Kenyan Premier League, replacing Paul Nkata. The club won its first match with Spier at the helm, a 3–1 league victory over Posta Rangers. At the end of his contract in June 2022, he did not sign a new deal and left the club.

In August 2024, Spier was named new head coach of FC Ulaanbaatar of the Mongolian Premier League for the 2024–25 season. The club won its first match with Spier as manager, a 1–0 opening-match result over reigning champions SP Falcons.
