= Nicholas Kipkirui =

Kenyan footballer (born 1996)

Personal information
- Date of birth: 31 May 1996 (age 30)
- Place of birth: Kericho, Kenya
- Height: 1.71 m (5 ft 7 in)
- Position: Striker

Team information
- Current team: LIONS FC

Youth career
- 2015-2016: Sosiot Matrix

Senior career*
| Years | Team | Apps | (Gls) |
| 2017 | Zoo FC | 33 | (9) |
| 2018 | Zoo FC | 27 | (14) |
| 2018-19 | Gor Mahia | 27 | (9) |
| 2019-21 | Gor Mahia | 2 | (0) |
| 2021-22 | Nairobi City Stars | 33 | (6) |
| 2021-22 | KCB | 0 | (0) |

International career^{‡}
| 2017– | Kenya | 1 | (0) |
- * Club domestic league appearances and goals as of 19:31, 14 March 2022 (UTC) ‡ National team caps and goals as of 19:31, 14 March 2022 (UTC)

Nicholas Kipkirui (born 31 May 1996) is a Kenyan striker with DIVISION ONE LIONS FC]].

== Club career ==
He formerly turned out for Kericho-based Zoo FC before moving to Gor Mahia in 2018 then to Nairobi City Stars in March 2021.

While at Gor Mahia he won a treble of Kenyan Premier League titles in 2018, 2018-19 and 2019-20.

== National teams ==
He was capped for the Kenya national football team during an international friendly away to Mauritania in Aug 2017 after coming on as a late substitute at the Stade Adrar.

In 2018 he made the provisional list for Kenya's Olympics squad, the Kenya U23.
