= Eric Ochieng =

Kenyan footballer (born 1982)

Personal information
- Date of birth: 25 August 1982 (age 44)
- Position: Midfielder

Senior career*
Years	Team	Apps	(Gls)
2008–2010	Red Berets		
2011	A.F.C. Leopards		
2012–2013	Bandari		
2014–2017	Gor Mahia		
2018	Wazito		
2019–2020	Nairobi City Stars		
2020–	Dandora Love		

International career
1997	Kenya	1	(0)
- * Club domestic league appearances and goals

Eric Ochieng Opondo is a Kenyan former footballer who played as a midfielder for several Kenyan Premier League clubs including Red Berets, A.F.C. Leopards, Bandari, Gor Mahia, Wazito and Nairobi City Stars.

Ochieng turns out for second-tier side Kenyan National Super League Dandora Love as he pursues his coaching badges

He earned one cap for the Kenyan national team.
