= Elvis Rupia =

Kenyan footballer (born 1995)

Personal information
- Full name: Elvis Baranga Rupia
- Date of birth: 12 April 1995 (age 31)
- Height: 1.76 m (5 ft 9 in)
- Position: Striker

Team information
- Current team: Singida Black Stars
- Number: 9

Youth career
- Nakuru AllStars

Senior career*
Years	Team	Apps	(Gls)
2015	Muhoroni Youth F.C.	5	(0)
2017–2018	Nzoia Sugar	42	(17)
2018–2019	Power Dynamos		
2019	Wazito FC		
2020–21	AFC Leopards		(17)
2021–2022	Bisha	21	(1)
2022–2023	Kenya Police FC		(27)
2023–2024	Singida Big Stars	7	(1)
2024–	Singida Black Stars (Note: Known as "Ihefu SC" until 2024)	14	(5)

International career^{‡}
2020–	Kenya	2	(1)
- * Club domestic league appearances and goals as of 1 July 2024 ‡ National team caps and goals as of 25 June 2023

Elvis Baranga Rupia (born 12 April 1995) is a Kenyan professional footballer who plays as a striker for Tanzanian Premier League side Singida Black Stars and the Kenya national team.

== Career ==
Rupia formerly turned out for Kenyan Premier League sides Muhoroni Youth F.C., Nzoia Sugar, Zambian side Power Dynamos, Wazito FC, AFC Leopards and Saudi Arabian side Bisha.

Rupia emerged the top scorer at the end of the 2022–23 Kenyan Premier League after scoring 27 goals for Kenya Police FC breaking a 47-year-old record of 26 goals set by Maurice Ochieng back in the 1976 premier league season.
