= Felix 'Toti' Ochieng =

Kenyan rugby union coach

Felix 'Toti' Ochieng is the former head coach of the Kenya national rugby union sevens team. Felix had been the assistant coach and was promoted when Paul Treu resigned in late 2014.
