= Bolton Omwenga =

Kenyan footballer (born 1996)

Timothy Bolton Omwenga
Personal information
- Full name: Bolton Omwenga
- Date of birth: 17 December 1996 (age 29)
- Height: 1.79 m (5 ft 10 in)
- Position: Defender

Senior career*
Years	Team	Apps	(Gls)
2016	Nzoia Sugar F.C.		
2017–2018	F.C. Kariobangi Sharks	43	(4)
2018–19	KCB	27	(3)
2019–20	KCB	2	(0)
2019–20	Biashara United		
2020–21	Nairobi City Stars	22	(2)
2021–22	Kagera Sugar F.C.		

International career^{‡}
2018–	Kenya U23	4	(0)
2017–	Kenya	5	(0)
- * Club domestic league appearances and goals as of 19:38, 22 March 2022 (UTC) ‡ National team caps and goals as of 19:38, 22 March 2022 (UTC)

Timothy Bolton Omwenga (born 17 December 1996) is a Kenyan International defender currently in the ranks of Tanzanian Premier League side Kagera Sugar F.C.

== Club career ==
The left back turned out for Nzoia Sugar F.C. in the second tier National Super League in 2016 before moving to F.C. Kariobangi Sharks in 2017 in their debut Kenyan Premier League season.

After two seasons, he moved to KCB and spent another two seasons before crossing over to Tanzanian Premier League side Biashara United.

He then returned to Kenya to join Nairobi City Stars halfway through the 2020–21 season before making a trip back to Tanzania to join his current station Kagera Sugar F.C. for 2021–22 season.

== International ==
Botlon has been capped five times for the Kenya national football team between 2017 and 2018. His first game was in April 2018 against Malawi at the Kenyatta Stadium in Machakos.

In 2018 he featured in four games with Kenya's Olympics squad, the Kenya U23 In 2021 he was recalled to the Kenya national football team for 2022 FIFA World Cup qualification (CAF)
