= Bernard Mwalala =

Kenyan football coach (born 1984)

Personal information
- Date of birth: 10 October 1984 (age 42)
- Height: 1.75 m (5 ft 9 in)
- Position: Striker
2010-11	Coastal Union F.C.		

Managerial career
- Years: Team
- 2021–2022: Kakamega Homeboyz F.C. (head coach)

Bernard Mwalala (born 10 October 1984) is a former Kenyan football striker and immediate former head coach of Kenyan Premier League side Kakamega Homeboyz F.C.

== Career ==
He played his club football in Kenya, Tanzania, Rwanda, Uganda, Malaysia, and Oman.

He formerly coached Tanzanian lower-tier sides Muweza FC and Magomeni, Coastal Union F.C. as an assistant, and Kenyan sides Nzoia Sugar F.C., Bandari F.C. and Kakamega Homeboyz F.C. as head coach.
