= David Gateri =

Kenyan footballer (born 1994)

Personal information
- Date of birth: 9 June 1994 (age 32)
- Place of birth: Nairobi, Kenya
- Height: 1.73 m (5 ft 8 in)
- Position: Midfielder

Team information
- Current team: Nairobi City Stars

Senior career*
Years	Team	Apps	(Gls)
2010–2011	Nairobi City Stars		
2011–2014	ASD Cape Town		
2015–2016	Bandari	8	(0)
2017	Nakumatt	17	(0)
2018	Ushuru		
2018	Tusker	4	(0)
2018	Mount Kenya United		
2019–	Nairobi City Stars	7	(0)

International career^{‡}
2011–	Kenya	7	(0)
- * Club domestic league appearances and goals as of 17:14, 30 August 2019 (UTC) ‡ National team caps and goals as of 17:14, 30 August 2019 (UTC)

David Gateri (born 9 June 1994) is a Kenyan international footballer who plays for Nairobi City Stars as a midfielder.

== Career ==
Born in Nairobi, Gateri has played club football for Nairobi City Stars, ASD Cape Town, Bandari, Nakumatt, Ushuru, Tusker and Mount Kenya United.

In September 2010, following elite scouting, Gateri went to Cape United Soccer School of excellence in Cape Town-South Africa and passed trials. He delayed his move due to school exams but joined them later in June 2011.

Part of the highlight of his football was back in April 2013 when, while part of ASD Academy, he went for a two-week trial at English Premier League side Sunderland.

After four years at ASD Academy he returned home to join coastal side Bandari, before spending time with Nakumatt, Ushuru, Tusker and Mount Kenya United.

He was handed his international debut for Kenya in 2011.
