= Bernard Odhiambo =

Kenyan footballer

Benard Odhiambo Nyawach
Personal information
- Position: Midfielder

Senior career*
Years	Team	Apps	(Gls)
2001–2006	Gor Mahia		
2008	Sofapaka		

International career
2001–2002	Kenya	2	(0)
- * Club domestic league appearances and goals

Bernard Odhiambo is a Kenyan former international footballer who played as a midfielder.

== Career ==
Odhiambo played club football for Gor Mahia and Sofapaka.

He earned two international caps for Kenya between 2001 and 2002.
