= Tedian Esilaba =

Kenyan footballer

Tedian Atuto Esilaba
Personal information
- Full name: Tedian Atuto Esilaba
- Date of birth: 5 July 1993 (age 33)
- Place of birth: Nairobi, Kenya
- Position: Defender

Senior career*
Years	Team	Apps	(Gls)
2019	Fortune FC		
2020	Nairobi City Stars	0	(0)
2021-23	AFC Leopards	24	(0)
- * Club domestic league appearances and goals as of 12 May 2026

Tedian Atuto Esilaba (born 5 Jul 1993) is a Kenyan professional footballer who plays as a defender. He featured for several Kenyan clubs including Administration Police FC, Fortune Sacco, Bidco United, as well as Kenyan Premier League sides Nairobi City Stars, and AFC Leopards.

== Club career ==
Esilaba joined promotion chasing Nairobi City Stars in January 2020 from National Super League side Fortune Sacco and was part of the City Stars squad that regained their premier league status that year.

In February 2021, he joined AFC Leopards during the FKF Premier League mid-season transfer window and went on to play regularly though his stay was later curtailed by injuries.

He extended his stay, amongst other players, during the offseason ahead of the 2022–23 season for one more term.

He left AFC Leopards in August 2023 following the expiration of his contract. He made the news after his stay at Leopards by revealing that witchcraft is a part of the Kenyan game.

Beyond football, Tedian is known for love for fitness and runs a gymnasium in Kasarani, Nairobi.
