= Robina Hope Mukisa =

Ugandan politician (born 1991)

Hope Robina Mukisa

District Woman Representative for Namayingo District
- Incumbent
- Assumed office 2016

Personal details
- Born: Uganda
- Party: National Resistance Movement (NRM)
- Education: B.Com, Makerere University (2016)
- Occupation: Legislator, Politician
- Known for: Member, Committee on Tourism, Trade and Industry; Member, Uganda Women Parliamentary Association (UWOPA)

Hope Robina Mukisa (born 4 September 1991) is a Ugandan female legislator and politician. She is the district woman representative for Namayingo District in the Parliament of Uganda. She joined Parliament in 2016 on the National Resistance Movement party (NRM) ticket, the party in political leadership in Uganda under the chairmanship of Yoweri Kaguta Museveni, the president of the Republic of Uganda.

== Early life and education ==
Mukisa was born on 4 September 1991. She attended St. Michael High School Mukono where she sat her Uganda Advanced Certificate of Education (UACE) in 2010. She thereafter attended Makerere University and graduated with a bachelor's degree in commerce (BCOM) in 2016.

== Career ==
Mukisa is a member of Parliament of Uganda representing the people of Namayingo district as a district woman representative, a position she has held since 2016. In parliament, she serves on the Committee on Tourism Trade and Industry. She is also a member of the Uganda Women Parliamentary Association (UWOPA), where she serves on the "succession act" round table committee.
