= Sylvester Owino =

Kenyan footballer (born 2001)

Sylvester Owino Ochino is a Kenyan defender currently in the ranks of Kenyan Premier League side Gor Mahia and the Kenya national football team.

Sylvester formerly turned out for Vihiga Bullets and Kakamega Homeboyz F.C. before landing at Gor Mahia.

He made his Kenya debut in a 2015 Africa Cup of Nations qualifier against Zimbabwe at Namboole Stadium, Uganda in September 2024.
