= Jefari Owiti =

Kenyan footballer (born 1998)

Personal information
- Full name: Jefari Odeny Owiti
- Date of birth: 17 November 1998 (age 27)
- Position: Striker

Team information
- Current team: Chemelil Sugar

Senior career*
Years	Team	Apps	(Gls)
2016–	Chemelil Sugar		

International career^{‡}
2016–	Kenya	1	(0)
- * Club domestic league appearances and goals as of 14:25, 1 May 2017 (UTC) ‡ National team caps and goals as of 14:25, 1 May 2017 (UTC)

Jefari Odeny Owiti (born 17 November 1998) is a Kenyan international footballer who plays for Chemelil Sugar, as a striker.

== Career ==
Owiti has played club football for Chemelil Sugar.

He made his international debut for Kenya in 2016.
