= Yusuf Mukisa =

Ugandan footballer (born 1993)

Personal information
- Full name: Yusuf Mukisa Lubowa
- Date of birth: 19 July 1993 (age 33)
- Place of birth: Mulago, Uganda
- Height: 1.72 m (5 ft 8 in)
- Position: Defender

Team information
- Current team: SC Villa

Senior career*
Years	Team	Apps	(Gls)
2011–2014	Proline FC		
2014–2016	Vipers SC		
2016–2017	Proline FC		
2017–2018	Bul FC		
2018–	SC Villa		

International career
2012–2013	Uganda	2	(0)
- * Club domestic league appearances and goals

Yusuf Mukisa (born 19 July 1993) is a Ugandan football defender who as of the year 2024 plays for SC Villa.

== Club career ==
=== Proline FC ===
From 2011 up to 2014 Yusuf Mukisa played for Proline FC as a defender. After the 2013/2014 season Proline FC was relegated, Yusuf was released and later signed by Vipers SC.

After a two years stay at Vipers SC which had won the Uganda Premier League title in the 2014/15 season. The promoted league side Proline FC later unveiled four more players to make their squad stronger for the busy 2016- 2017 season. These four players included Yusuf Mukisa, Sam Tiyo Kintu from Express FC, Farouk Musisi (Lweza) and lastly Mustapha Mujuzi from Synergy FC.

=== Vipers SC ===
He played for Vipers SC for two seasons that is 2014/15 and that of 2014/15 in which Vipers SC won the Uganda premier league title. He then went back to his former club Proline FC ahead of the 2016/17 season.

== Career statistics. ==
Below are the Yusuf Mukisa's career statistics as of August, 2024.

YEAR	APPS	GOALS	TROPHIES	TEAM(S)	REF
2011-2012					
2012-2013	2	0	0	UGANDA CRANES	
2014-2016					
2016-2017					
2017-2018					
2018-					
