= Mt Kenya United F.C. =

Kenyan football club

- Full name: Mt Kenya United Football Club
- Founded: 2006; 20 years ago
- Chairman: Francis MUREI THI
- Coach: Anthony Mwangi
- League: Kenyan Premier League
- 2014: FKF Division One, 2nd (Zone A, ) (promoted)
Home colours	Away colours	Third colours

Mt Kenya United Football Club is a professional association football club based in Nairobi, Kenya. The club competes in the Kenyan Premier League after qualifying from the Kenyan National Super League at second position behind Posta Rangers.

The club was renamed from Nakumatt to Mt Kenya United in November 2018.
