= Anthony Akhulia =

Kenyan football manager

Personal information
- Full name: Anthony Akhulia
- Date of birth: 3 September 1984 (age 42)
- Place of birth: Lurambi, Kakamega County
- Height: 1.75 m (5 ft 9 in)
- Position: Defender

Senior career*
Years	Team	Apps	(Gls)
2007-2010	Bidco United F.C.		

Managerial career
- 2017-: Bidco United F.C. (Head Coach)
- * Club domestic league appearances and goals

Anthony Akhulia is a former Kenyan defender who currently serves as the head coach at Kenyan Premier League side Bidco United F.C.

== Career ==
Akhulia started out as a player at Bidco United F.C. in 2007 while working at Bidco Africa as a casual labourer.

He later graduated to a kit manager, then team manager, assistant coach, and interim coach before finally taking the reins of head coach upon exit of Robert Matano in 2017. He led the team to the Kenyan topflight in the year 2020.

== Certification ==
Akhulia is KNVB trained and holds CAF 'D', CAF 'C', and CAF 'B' coaching licences.

== Honours ==
=== Club ===
Bidco United

- Kenyan National Super League

(silver) Runners-up (1): 2019-20

- Betway Cup

(bronze) Second runners-up (1): 2021
