= Sanjin Alagić =

Bosnian football manager (born 1977)

Personal information
- Date of birth: 26 September 1977 (age 49)
- Place of birth: Sarajevo, SR Bosnia and Herzegovina, SFR Yugoslavia

Managerial career
- Years: Team
- 1996–2006: Sarajevo (youth)
- 2005–2006: Sarajevo U17
- 2006–2010: Al-Ahli (youth)
- 2010–2011: Al-Salmiya (youth)
- 2011: Al-Salmiya (assistant)
- 2011–2013: Al-Salmiya
- 2013–2014: Qadsia (youth)
- 2014–2015: Sarajevo U17
- 2016: Sarajevo U19
- 2016–2018: Sarajevo (academy director)
- 2016–2019: Bosnia and Herzegovina U21 (assistant)
- 2018–2019: Šamorín
- 2019–2021: Nairobi City Stars
- 2022–2023: Velež Mostar (sporting director)
- 2024: Petrolul Ploiești (assistant)

Sanjin Alagić (born 26 September 1977) is a Bosnian professional football manager and former player.

He previously managed hometown club Sarajevo (academy and youth teams), Al-Ahli, Qadsia (youth team), Al-Salmiya, Šamorín and Nairobi City Stars.

== Honours ==
=== Coach ===
Nairobi City Stars

- Kenyan National Super League: 2019–20
