= Vihiga United F.C. =

Kenyan football club

Vihiga United
- Full name: Vihiga United Football Club
- Founded: 2014
- Ground: Bukhungu Sports Complex; Kakamega, Kenya
- Head coach: Mike Mururi
- League: Kenyan Premier League
- 2021/22: 9th
Home colours

Vihiga United are a football team from Mbale, Vihiga County currently playing in the Kenya Premier League, having been promoted for the 2018 season.

Their colours are green and yellow.

They were captained by Bernard Ochieng during their maiden KPL season in 2018. Ochieng was also in the mix to represent the Kenya national team during the season. Vihiga upset champions Gor Mahia 2-0 late in the season which nearly ensured they would avoid relegation back to the second division and ended up finishing their maiden premier league season in 12th position.

== See also ==
- Vihiga Queens
