= Zoo Kericho F.C. =

Association football club in Kenya

- Full name: Zoo Kericho Football Club
- Nickname: Zoo
- Founded: 2009; 17 years ago
- Ground: Green Stadium, Kericho, Kenya
- Capacity: 3,000
- Chairman: (Kenya) Ken Ochieng
- Head coach: (Kenya) Herman Iswekha
- League: FKF Division One League
- 2020–21: ▼ Relegated to FKF Division One League
- Website: http://www.zoofc.org/
Home colours

Zoo Kericho Football Club is a football club based in Kericho, Kenya. The club first participated in the Kenya Premier League in 2017, the highest level of the Kenyan football league system.

On 4 May 2021, Football Kenya Federation announced that the club had been relegated to Kenyan football second tier, National Super League, due to allegations of match fixing.

The club plays its home games at Green Stadium in Kericho town.

== History ==
Zoo FC was formed in 2009 and joined the national league in 2010. The club has twice failed to earn promotion to the top tier on technical grounds. In 2014 the league awarded points to Shabana who, as a result, finished ahead of Zoo FC in the league table. In 2015, due to changes in the league structure no teams were relegated from the top tier Kenya Premier League. In 2017, Zoo FC was promoted to the Kenyan Premier League following an expansion of the top tier league to accommodate 18 teams.
