= Wazito F.C. =

Association football club in Kenya

Wazito Football Club
- Full name: Wazito Football Club
- Nickname: The yellow ship
- Founded: 2011; 15 years ago
- Ground: Kenyatta Stadium, Machakos
- Owner: (Sweden) Ricardo Badoer
- Chairman: (Kenya) CEO DAVID GEE
- Manager: (Kenya) Fred Ambani
- League: FKF Premier League
- 2022–23: 16th, Kenyan Premier League
Home colours	Away colours

Wazito Football club is a professional association football club based Nairobi, Kenya. It is owned by Swedish businessman Ricardo Badoer.

In 2023 the club was renamed Muhoroni Youth.

== History ==
=== Formation ===
Wazito Football Club was formed in 2011 by the University of Nairobi soccer team and the alumni members of the soccer team. Experienced players mentor the students on career paths and life experiences. The network has created morally upright students who have got jobs upon graduation.

After training together with the students for some time the alumni members decided they could form one strong team to compete in the league. In order to build team identity, in the 2011 season, Wazito played in many friendlies against the league sides and participated in tournaments.

Wazito currently plays in the Kenyan Premier League, the first-tier league in the country.

=== 2012 ===
In 2012 Wazito debuted in the Nairobi County Champions League, a division of the sixth tier of the Kenyan Football League system. It was a good start for Wazito and they managed to win the league and be promoted to the Kenyan Regional Leagues.

=== 2013 ===
The Kenyan Regional Leagues was the next hurdle for Wazito. It was another good campaign and a nervy end to the season where Wazito edged off Kangemi United on penalties to emerge as the Kenyan Regional Leagues winners. This meant back-to-back league titles for Wazito and promotion to the FKF Division one.

=== 2014 ===
FKF Division one was a notch higher as it involved much international travel. However, with adequate preseason training and some new signings to beef up the squad it was another good campaign for Wazito. Wazito won the league convincingly and was crowned champions with two games to spare. The Kenyan National Super League was the next stop.

=== 2015 ===
In 2015, the club played in the National Super League, the third tier of the Football Kenya Federation (FKF) league. It was a tough league which also meant extensive travels throughout the country for the team. For the first time, the team did not win the league but came second after Kenya Police. This earned the two teams' promotions to the second-division league of FKF.

=== 2016 ===
The second-tier league was renamed National Super League (NSL) by the new Football Kenya Federation. Wazito was among 20 clubs that played in the league. It turned out to be the toughest league for the team. At the end of the season, Wazito ended at position 11 with 51 points. The club remained in the league for the 2017 season.

=== 2017 ===
Wazito FC earned a promotion to Kenyan Premier League for the first time in their history after finishing second in the National Super League. The team was under coach Frank Ouna.

=== 2018 ===
Wazito's stay in the top-flight was however short-lived as they were relegated at the end of their first season. They were however handed a boost when Swedish businessman Ricardo Badoer acquired the club and pumped money into the team. They acquired some of the best players in the country to help the team reenter the top tier.

=== 2019 ===
Wazito earned promotion back to the top league after winning the National Super League title.

=== 2020 ===
During the 2019/20 season that ended prematurely in March due to COVID-19, Wazito ended up finishing 13th in the FKF Premier League, although only 23 out of the 34 games were played.

=== 2021 ===
At the start of 2020/21 season, Wazito appointed experienced Francis Kimanzi as head coach. Kimanzi has severally handled the Kenyan national team and helped Kenya attain its best-ever FIFA ranking, 68 in 2008. Wazito attained its best-ever finish in the topflight. They finished in the ninth position with 45 points.

=== 2022 ===
Head coach Francis Kimanzi, his assistants Jeff Odongo and John Kamau, and the goalkeepers' coach Samuel Koko left the club. Youth team head coach Fred Ambani assumed first-team duties in the interim.

=== 2023 ===
The name change to Muhoroni Youth occurred and the club remained in the Premier League under the new name.
