= Posta Rangers F.C. =

Kenyan football club

Posta Rangers
- Full name: Posta Rangers Football Club
- Nickname: The Mailmen
- Founded: 1980; 46 years ago
- Ground: Kipchoge Keino Stadium
- Capacity: 10,000
- Chairman: (Kenya) Stephen Gatundu
- Head coach: (Kenya) John Kamau
- League: Kenya Premier League
- 2025–2026: 15th
Home colours

Posta Rangers Football Club is a Kenyan professional football club, based in Nairobi. It competes in the Kenyan Premier League and competed in the 2012 KPL Top 8 Cup, where they were knocked out by Tusker.

The club was known as Posta Rangers Football Club from its establishment until the end of the 2011 season, from when it was known as Rangers Football Club until the end of the 2012 season, after which it was renamed Posta Rangers Football Club.
